= Porsche 911 (997) =

Sixth generation of the Porsche 911

Porsche 997
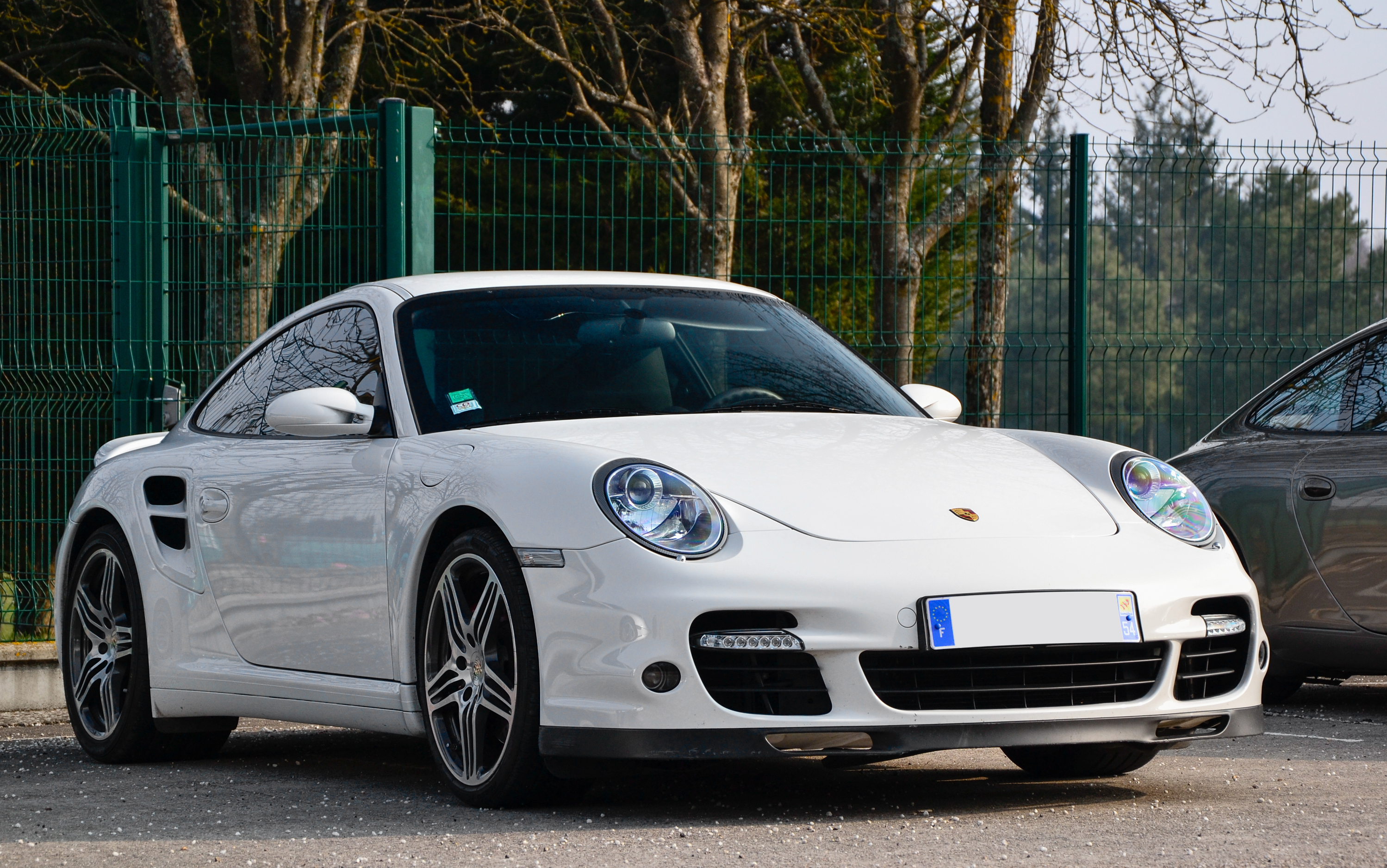
- Porsche 997 Turbo

Overview
- Manufacturer: Porsche AG
- Also called: Porsche 911; Porsche Carrera
- Production: July 2004–2013
- Assembly: Germany: Baden-Württemberg, Stuttgart
- Designer: Grant Larson (2001)

Body and chassis
- Class: Sports car (S)
- Body style: 2-door coupé; 2-door convertible; 2-door targa top; 2-door speedster
- Layout: Rear engine, rear wheel drive / all wheel drive
- Related: Porsche 987 Cayman; Porsche 987 Boxster; Ruf R Kompressor; Ruf RGT; Ruf Rt 12

Powertrain
- Engine: 3.6 L naturally aspirated/twin-turbocharged Flat-6; 3.8 L naturally aspirated/twin-turbocharged Flat-6; 4.0 L naturally aspirated Flat-6
- Transmission: 5-speed Mercedes-Benz 5G-Tronic (722.6) automatic 6-speed Aisin manual 7-speed ZF 7DT-series PDK

Dimensions
- Wheelbase: 2,350–2,360 mm (92.5–92.9 in)
- Length: 4,430–4,496 mm (174.4–177.0 in)
- Width: 1,808–1,852 mm (71.2–72.9 in)
- Height: 1,270–1,325 mm (50.0–52.2 in)

Chronology
- Predecessor: Porsche 996
- Successor: Porsche 991

The Porsche 997 is the sixth generation of the Porsche 911 sports car manufactured and sold by the German automobile manufacturer Porsche. It was sold between 2004 (for the 2005 model year) and 2013. Production of the Carrera and Carrera S coupé began in early 2004, and the all-wheel drive Carrera 4 and Carrera 4S began to be delivered to customers in November 2005. Deliveries of the Turbo and GT3 derivatives were carried out in late 2006, along with the GT2 in 2007. In addition to the coupé and cabriolet versions, Targa versions of the Carrera 4 and Carrera 4S were also available, which continued the trend of the "glass canopy" roof design utilized during the 993 and 996 generations. This was later reverted to the classic targa top layout used in earlier models of the 911 Targa with the introduction of the 991 generation.

The 997 was an evolution of the preceding 996, with significant changes being made to the interior and exterior styling (the most notable of these being the replacement of the "fried egg" headlamps used in the 996 with the classic "bug eye" units). Larger 18-inch wheels were fitted as standard, and other engineering changes include slightly increased power; however, the car is technically very similar to its predecessor despite many revisions. A new S version was offered, with additional power from a slightly larger engine, a sports suspension, and sports exhaust.

During 2009, Porsche refreshed the 997 lineup, making styling changes, incorporating a new engine with direct injection instead of the "Mezger" engine, and introducing the company's new "PDK" dual clutch transmission instead of the 5-speed Tiptronic automatic transmission sourced from Mercedes-Benz. As a result, the refreshed 997 models were faster, lighter, and more fuel efficient than the outgoing versions, with improved handling. In the case of the 997 Turbo, a comprehensively re-tuned all wheel drive system with ”torque vectoring" as an option was also a part of the upgrades package; in an October 2009 preliminary review, Car and Driver magazine estimated that when equipped with the PDK transmission, the updated Turbo should be capable of accelerating from 0–97 km/h (0–60 mph) in three seconds.

The 997 received mostly positive reviews from the worldwide motoring press; even British motoring journalist Jeremy Clarkson, a known detractor of Porsche cars, remarked that the 997 will "make love to your fingertips and stir your soul."

== First phase (997.1; 2004–2008) ==
=== History and development ===
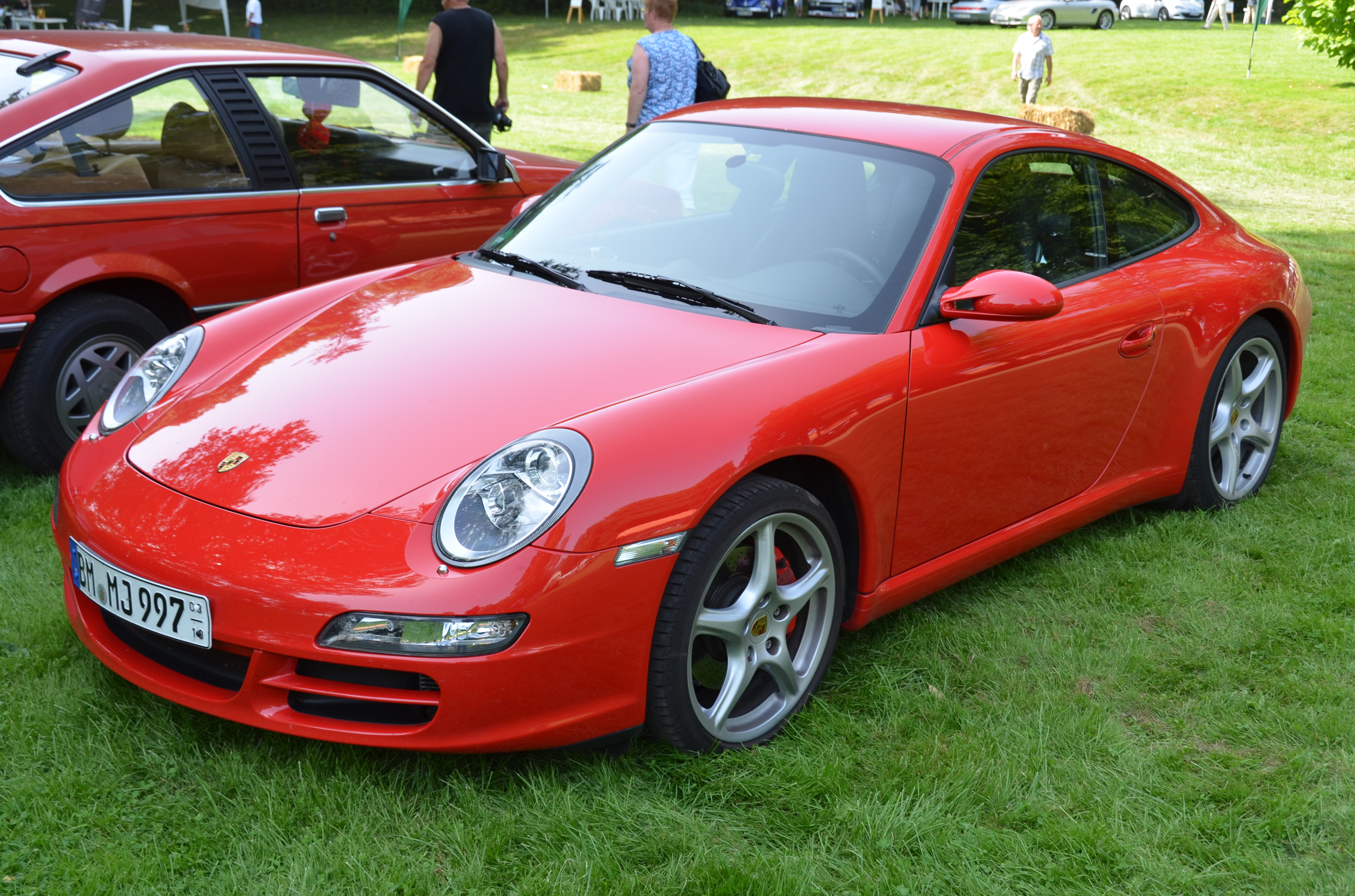
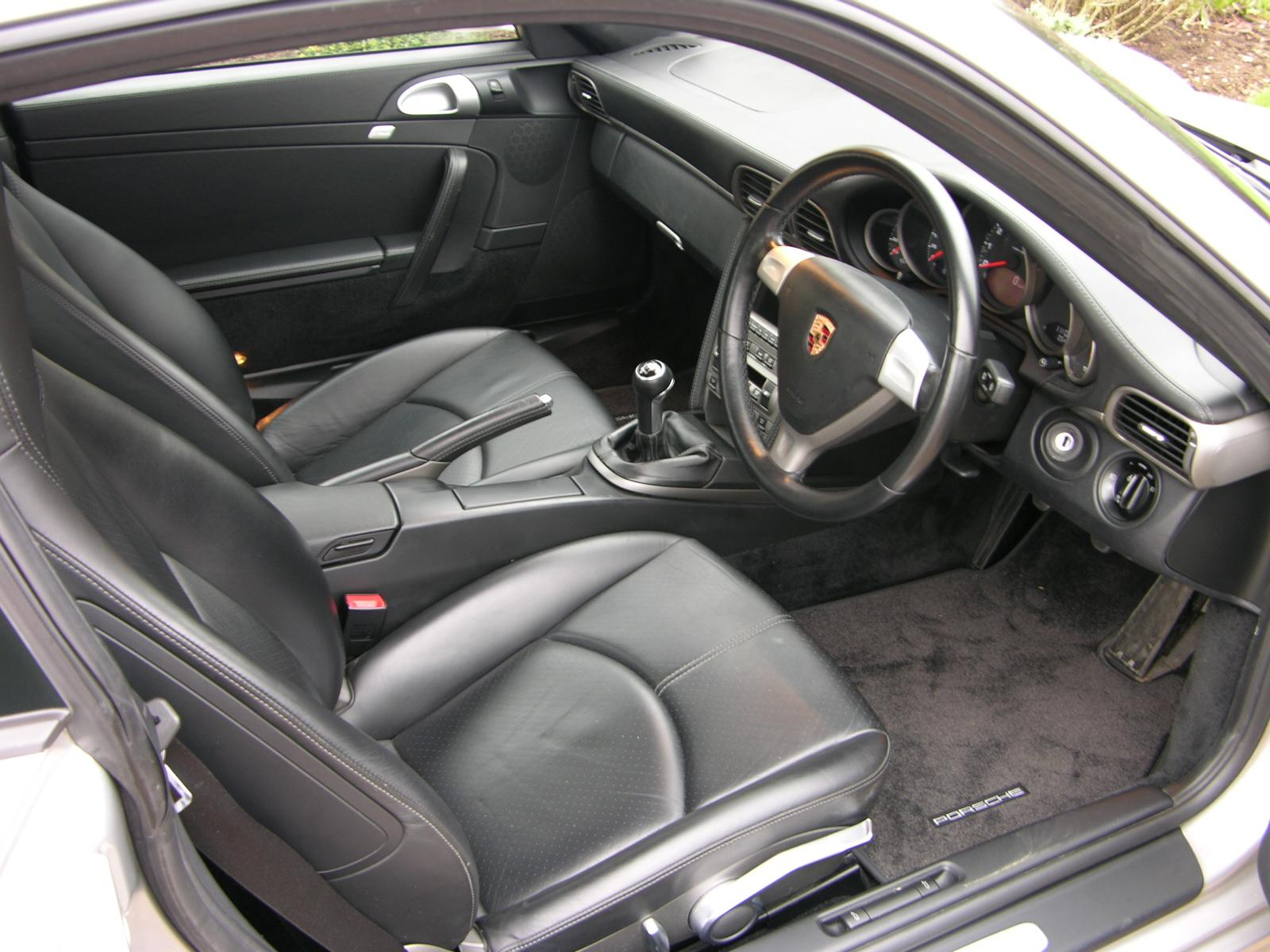

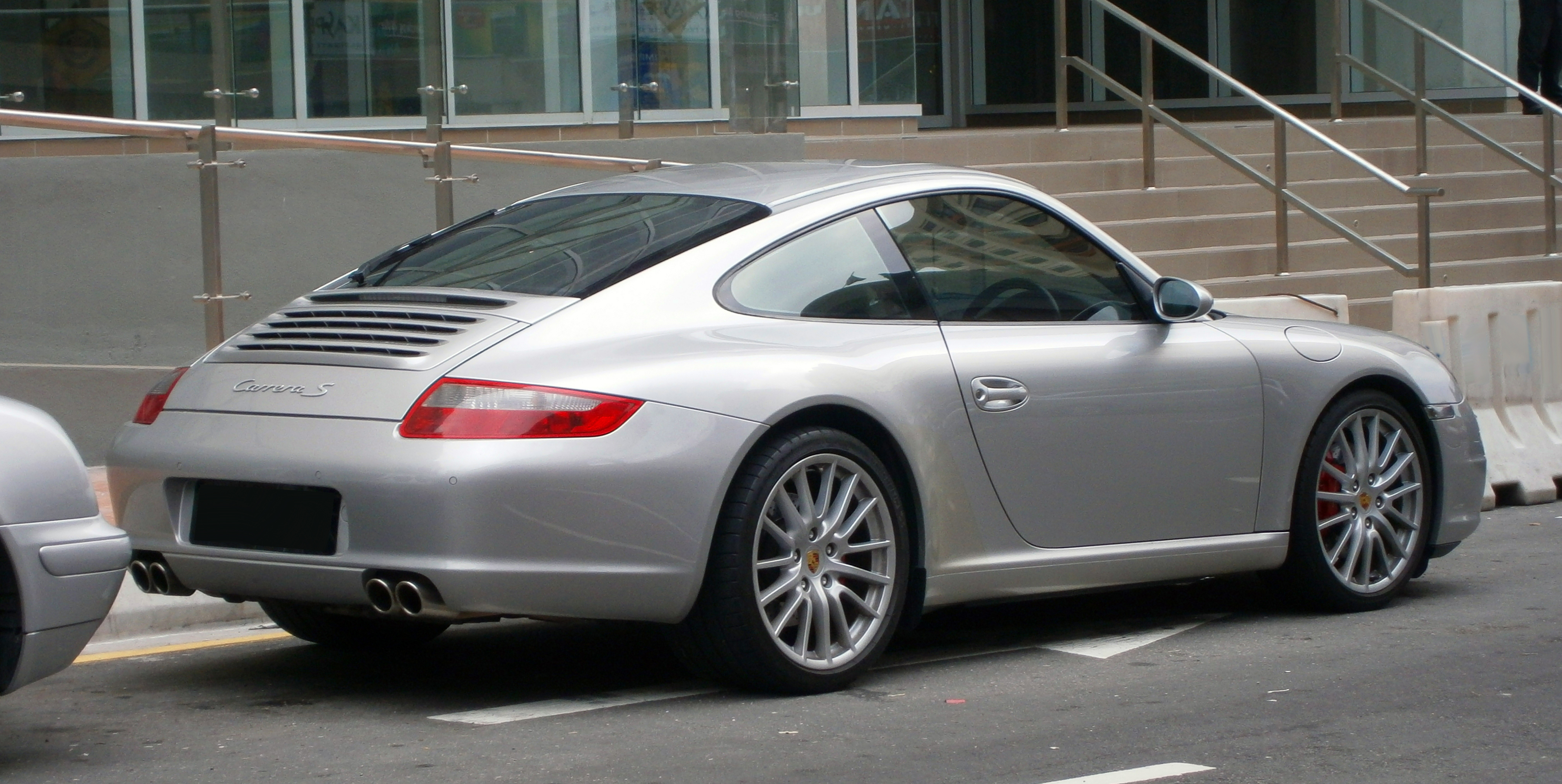
Porsche 997 Carrera S

By February 1999, just a few months into the 997 development programme that began in the fourth quarter of 1998, designers were already at work on the 997's body design. After numerous reviews during the rest of 1999 and full size clay models that were built from 2000 into 2001, a final design by designer Grant Larson was approved. Early prototypes were built in late 2001 for testing, based on newly set parameters. While the exterior styling was revised, it was very similar to what was observed in the 996. The rear bodywork was 88 mm (3.5 in) wider than its predecessor. However, the most notable aesthetic difference between the 997 and the 996 was the return to oval headlights like those of pre-996 Carreras, with separate indicator units. The interior was re-designed with new controls; however, it was more reminiscent of classic 911 interiors than of the outgoing 996. The body in general remained low profile with a drag coefficient of 0.28 for the Carrera and 0.29 for the Carrera S.

=== Cabriolet ===
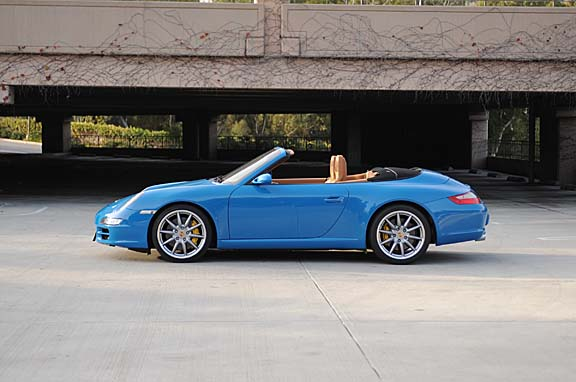
2006 Porsche Carrera S Cabriolet

For the first time, development of the cabriolet version of the 997 led the design and engineering effort at Porsche, with the coupé following. Porsche applied the logic that if you started with engineering challenges more unique to the cabriolet (for example, chassis stiffness), the coupé version would simply be more rigid. Despite additional weight, the cabriolet versions attain nearly the same performance figures as their coupé counterparts. Even the rear wing rises slightly higher on the cabriolets to compensate for differences in drag over the canvas top versus the smoother coupé shape. The 997 cabriolet had factory optional hard tops that provided better protection from unexpected weather conditions than the conventional canvas top. It is interchangeable with what is available in the late 996 cabriolet models. The hardtop also provides a winter option for cabriolet owners.

=== 911 Club Coupé (2005) ===
The 911 Club Coupé is a limited (50 units) version of the 2006 Carrera S coupé with X51 Powerkit commemorating the 50th anniversary of the Porsche Club of America (PCA).

The vehicle included an Azurro California-colour scheme (similar to the colour found on the Porsche 356), a vehicle identification number (VIN) which ended with the production number and special commemorative badging and door sills, Sport Chrono Package Plus system, and optional Porsche Ceramic Composite Brakes.

The car bearing chassis number #001 was transferred to the Porsche Museum in Stuttgart, Germany. One PCA member won the car bearing chassis number #050 in a sweepstakes drawing. The remaining 48 units were sold to randomly chosen U.S. and Canadian PCA members. After 2005-08-15, unsold units were made available to the general public.

The vehicle was unveiled in the PCA's 50th Annual Porsche Parade in Hershey, Pa.

The vehicle had an MSRP of US$99,911 or $145,911 CDN.

=== Targa ===
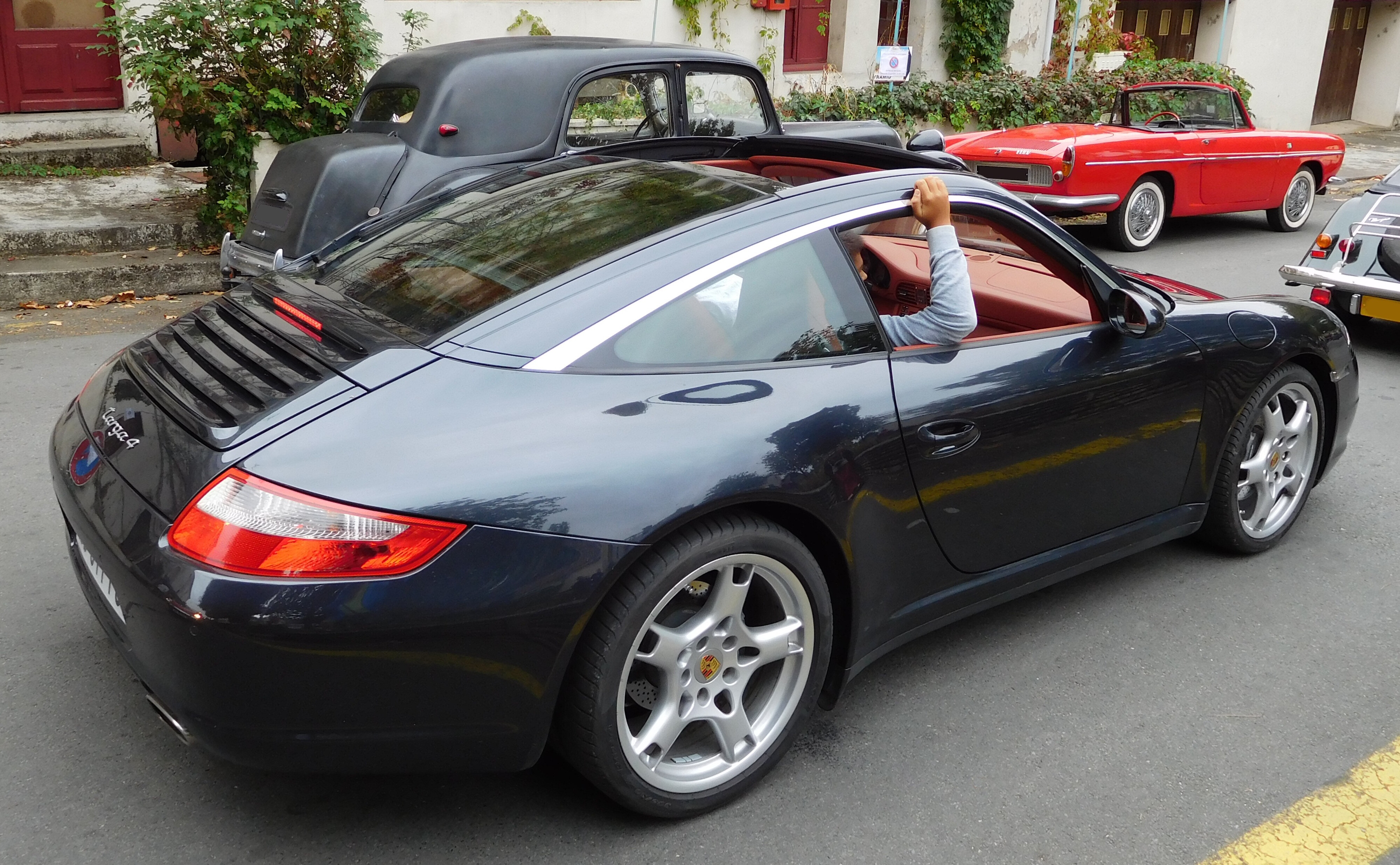
Porsche 997 Targa 4

The Targa 4 and 4S versions were introduced in 2006. Like its predecessors, the 993 and 996, the 997 Targa is equipped with a glass roof system. At any speed, the roof can be opened where it drops down 25 mm and slides a metre back underneath the rear window. As the roof weighs an additional 60 kg (132 lb), the suspension has been modified as compared to the other Carrera models. When the glass roof is retracted, a small glass deflector is raised above the windshield to aid aerodynamic stability.

Unlike previous versions, the 997 Targa was only available with all-wheel drive. Targa 4 models are slightly slower than the hard top Carrera models because of the heavier roof and the all-wheel-drive system.

The 997 Targa became available in the fall of 2006 as a 2007 Model. In the first year, Porsche produced 1,760 cars worldwide (with 800 sold in the US market) out of the 38,922 911 models produced in total.

=== Carrera S and 4S ===
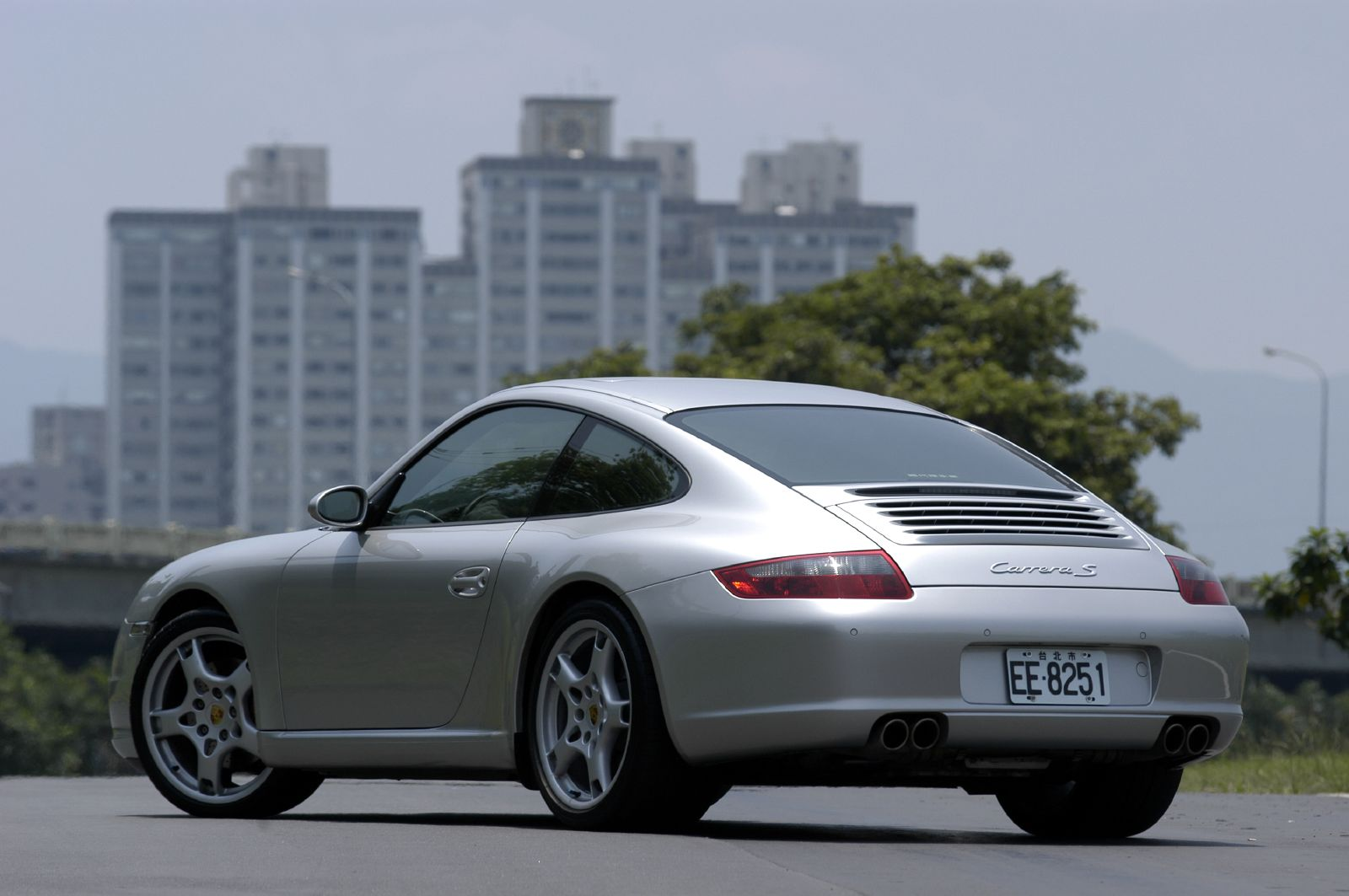
Porsche 997 Carrera S (rear view)

Following the success of the earlier 996 Carrera 4S, Porsche introduced the Carrera S in 2005 which had power output increased by 29 PS (21 kW; 29 bhp) as compared to the base Carrera.

The new all-wheel-drive Coupé, Cabriolet, and Targa versions were later available either in the S version alongside the Carrera with the following additional features:

- increased displacement of the engine (3.8 L vs 3.6 L) with increased power
- lowered suspension with PASM (Porsche Active Suspension Management, i.e. dynamically adjustable dampers)
- 19-inch wheels
- upgraded braking system
- sports exhaust
- Bi-Xenon headlights
- aluminium trim in the interior

=== Turbo ===
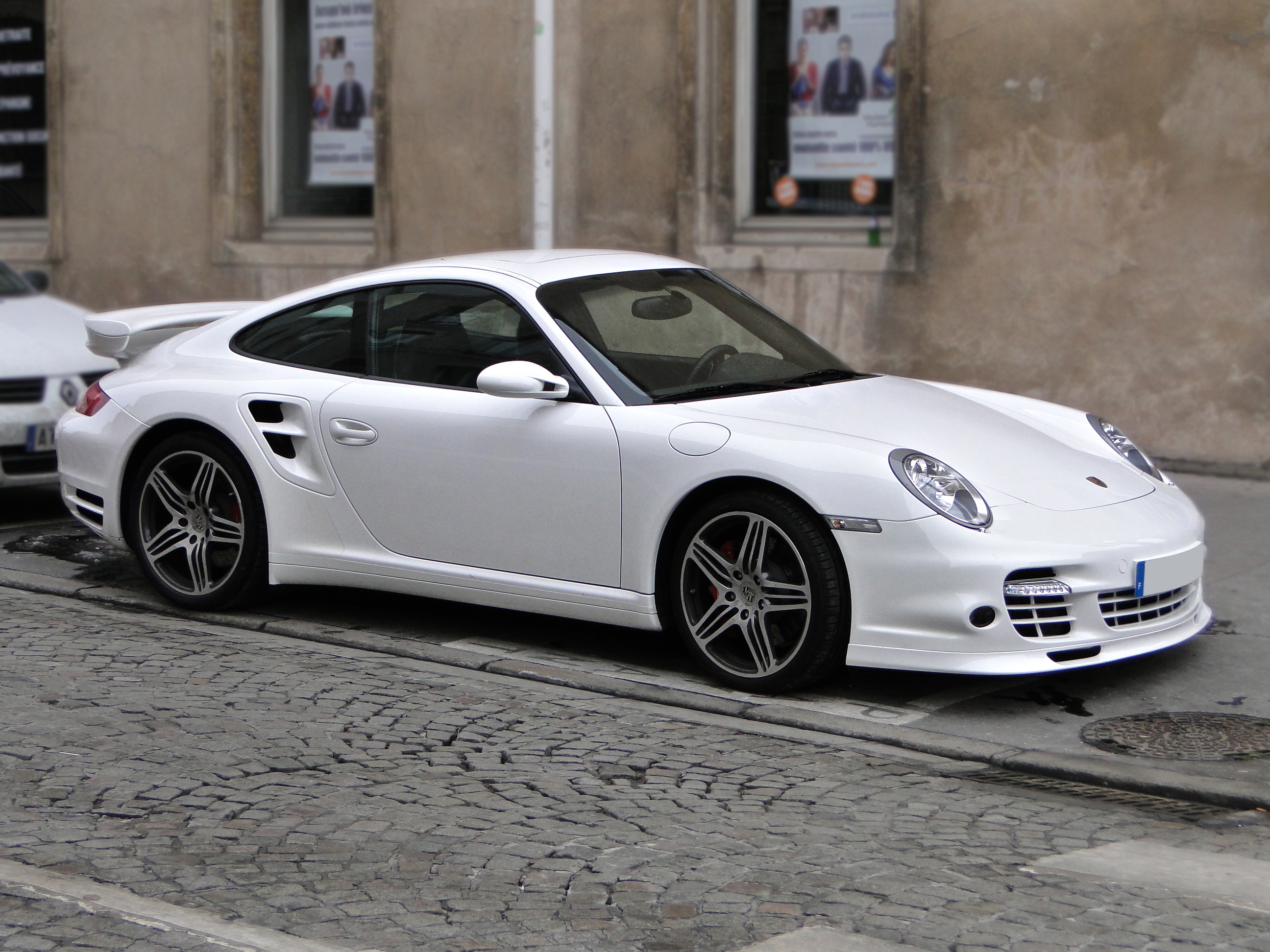

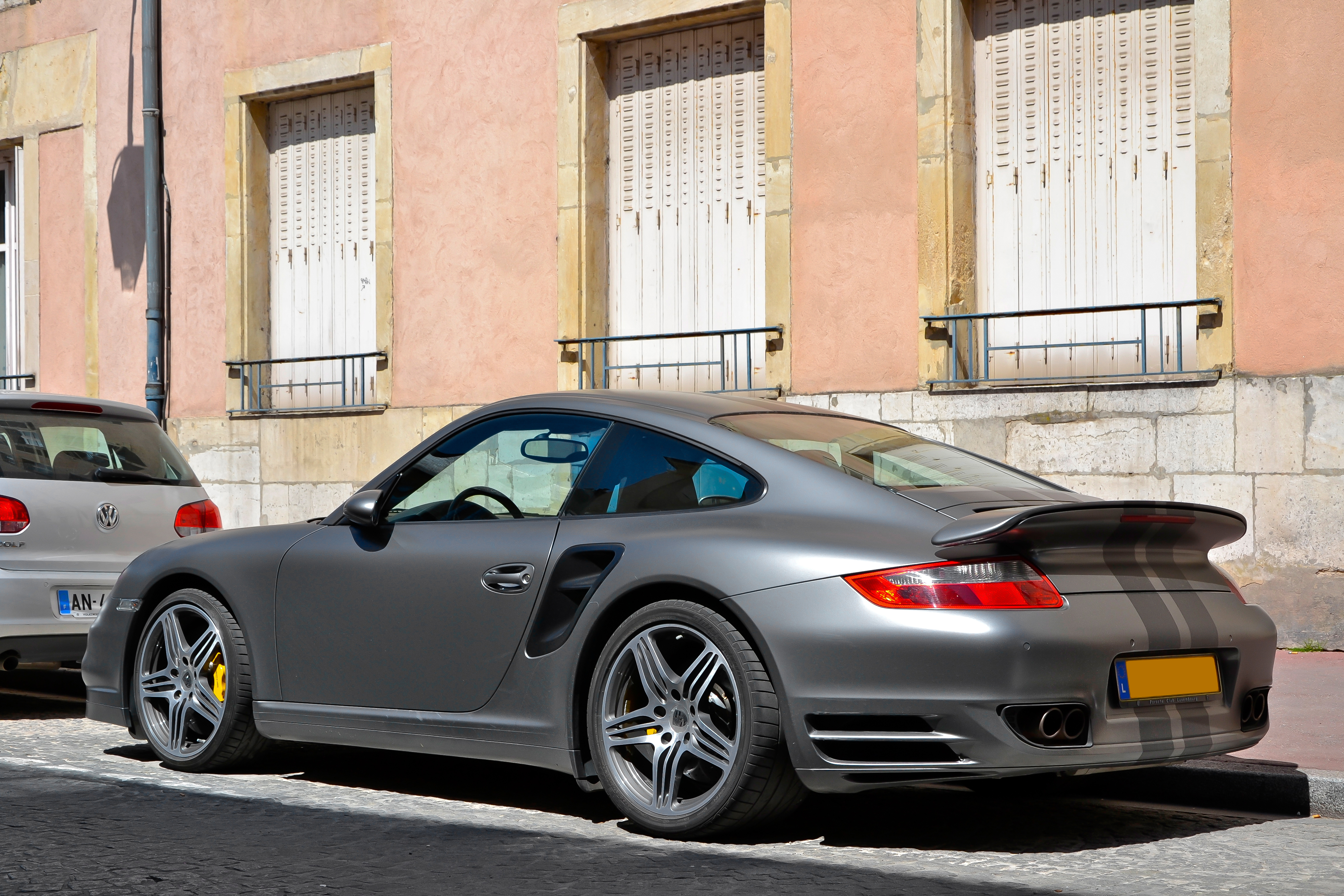
Porsche 911 (997) Turbo

The 997 Turbo debuted in February 2006 at the Geneva Motor Show. It featured a new front bumper with LED turn signal strips integrated in the air intakes; the fog lamps were moved to the corners of the bumpers. Large air vents fore and aft of the rear wheels provide other visual cues of the Turbo model. The Turbo utilises the wide body shell of the AWD models, giving it a more aggressive stance than the base 911 models. Also featured was a retractable rear wing, as used on the 996 Turbo, along with air vents on the rear quarter panels for effective engine cooling. The 997 Turbo is 41 kg (90 lb) lighter than its predecessor due to the extensive use of aluminium in key elements of the car.

The engine was based on the 911 GT1's design and is rated at 480 PS (353 kW; 473 bhp) and 620 N⋅m (457 lb⋅ft) (680 N⋅m (502 lb⋅ft) at overboost) of torque. The torque is managed by Porsche Traction Management (PTM) system in conjunction with the Porsche Stability Management (PSM) system in order for a safer utilisation of the torque produced by the engine.

The engine uses two BorgWarner VTG turbochargers, a first for a Porsche production car. The turbochargers are fitted with a two-stage resonance intake system. The Variable Turbine Geometry incorporates guide vanes on the turbine wheel that change their angle of attack with exhaust speed, reducing turbo lag at low speeds while opening up to prevent excessive back pressure at high RPM.

The optional Sport Chrono package allows the 911 Turbo to overboost for ten seconds (1.0 bar to 1.2 bar), increasing peak torque over a narrow RPM range.

According to official Porsche figures, the 997 Turbo accelerates from a standstill 0–100 km/h (0–62 mph) in 3.9 seconds with the manual transmission, and 3.7 seconds with the 5-speed Tiptronic S transmission. Motor Trend tested a manual version of the Turbo in 2006 and achieved a 0–60 mph (0–97 km/h) time of 3.2 seconds. Benchmark times to 200 km/h (124 mph) are 12.8 and 12.2 seconds, respectively. Maximum speed with either transmission is 310 km/h (193 mph).

As an option, Porsche also offered its ceramic brake system, PCCB (Porsche Ceramic Composite Brake). The advantages of this material mean a reduction of 17 kg (37 lb) compared to the standard brake system, better fade resistance owing to consistent friction values, and absolute corrosion resistance. The Turbo weighs around 3,460 lbs (1,569 kg). The brakes are 380 mm diameter at the front and 350 mm at the rear.

==== Turbo Cabriolet ====
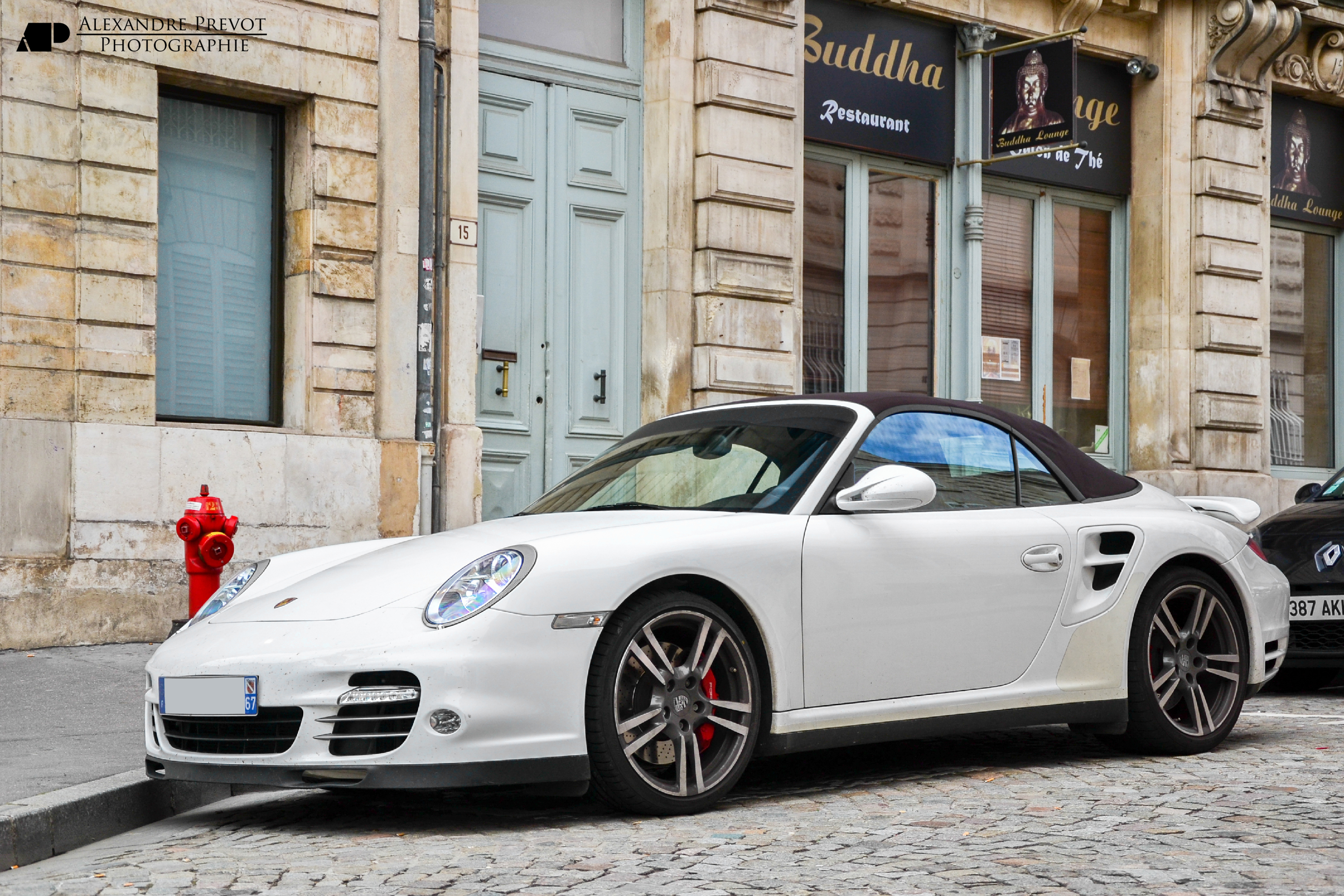
Porsche 997 Turbo Cabriolet

Porsche AG announced on 7 May 2007 that the 911 Turbo Cabriolet would go on sale in September 2007. The Porsche 997 Turbo Cabriolet became one of the fastest convertible sports cars in production. It is capable of similar top speeds and acceleration to the standard Porsche 997 Turbo coupé, a notable feat due to the typical problems associated with convertible variants of hardtop coupés, such as the poor aerodynamics of a soft top, a lack of torsional rigidity, and the consequential weight increase from structural members.

=== GT2 ===
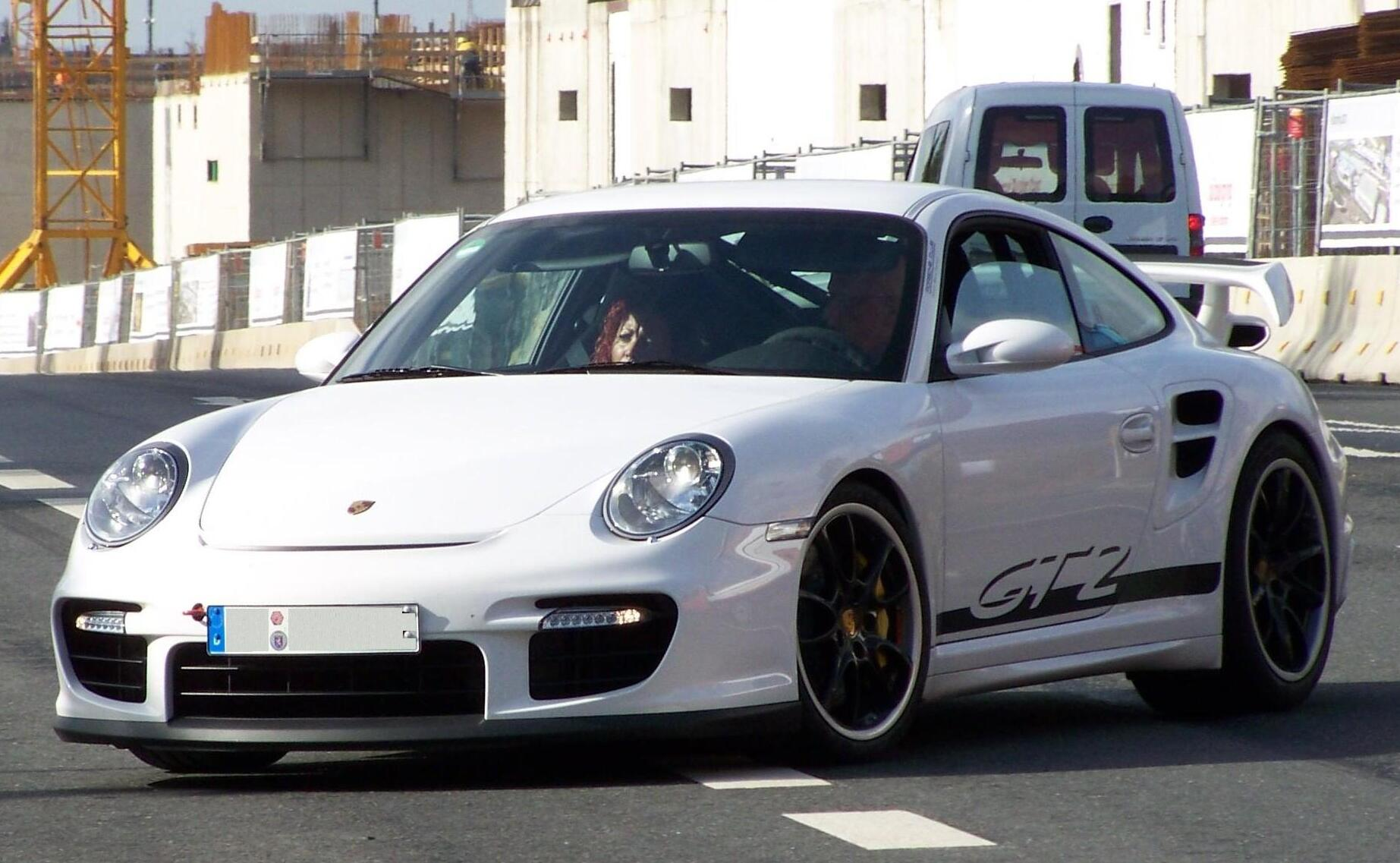

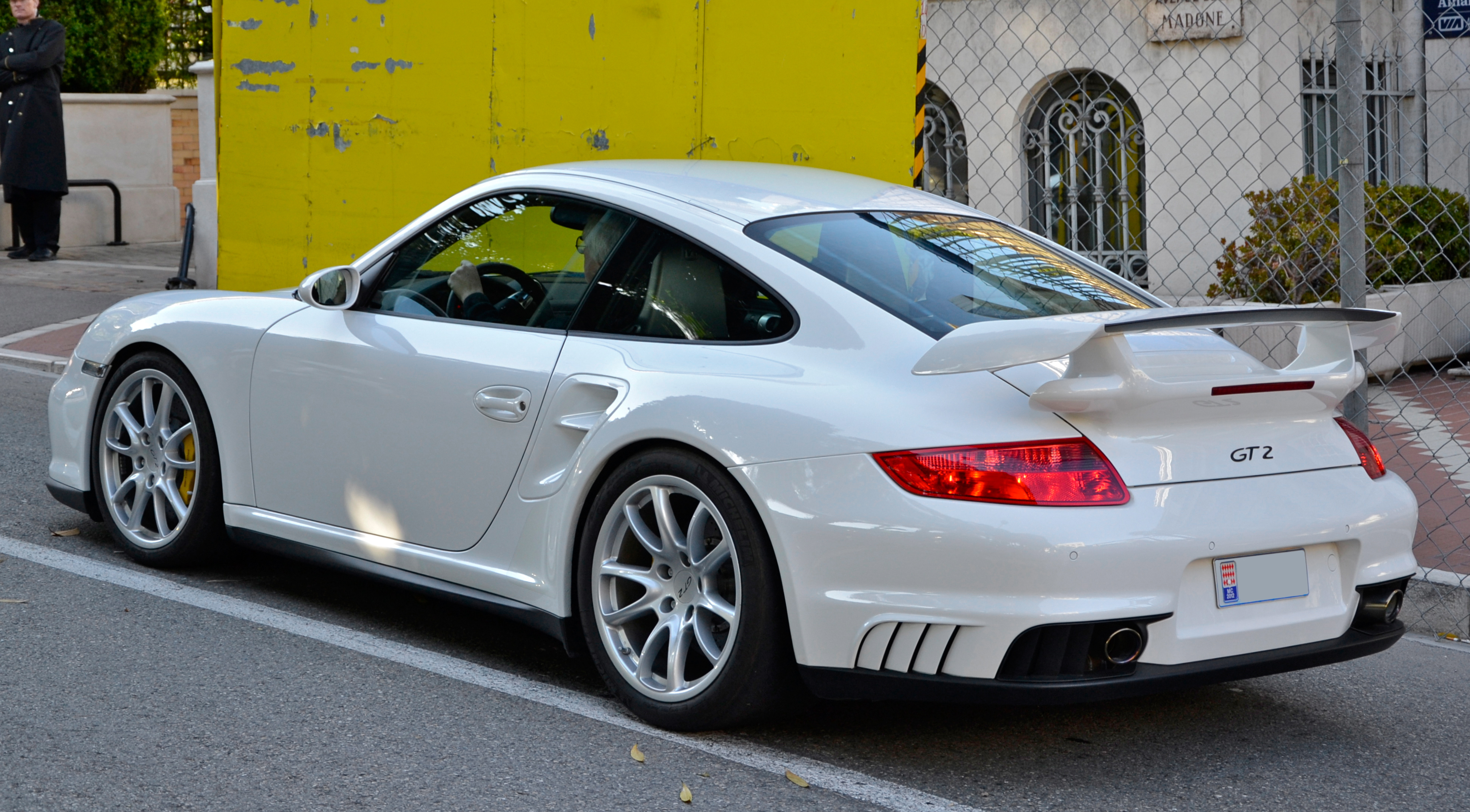
Porsche 997 GT2

The 996 GT2 was superseded by the 997 GT2, which went on sale in November 2007. At its release, the 997-generation Porsche 911 GT2 was the most powerful and fastest road-going 911 ever to have been sold to the public.

The GT2's engine was based on the existing 3.6 L (220 cu in) flat-6 engine, but features twin variable geometry turbochargers (as used on the 997 turbo), generating a maximum power output of 530 PS (390 kW; 523 bhp) at 6,500 rpm and 680 N⋅m (502 lb⋅ft) of torque at 2,200 rpm. Unlike the 997 Turbo, the 997 GT2 uses a rear wheel drive layout for reduced weight (primarily for competing in GT2 class racing as with its predecessors), and has a power increase from a newly designed expansion intake manifold, and shorter turbo intake manifolds. Further, a full titanium exhaust system was fitted to the 997 GT2 contributing to reduced weight as compared to the turbo. Despite the power hike, Porsche claims fuel consumption at full throttle is improved by 15 percent compared with the 997 Turbo. The GT2 accelerates in 3.4 seconds to 97 km/h (60 mph) and in 7.4 seconds to 161 km/h (100 mph) and has a top speed of 205 mph (330 km/h). This makes it the first 911 to exceed the 200 mph (322 km/h) top speed barrier after the 1998 Porsche 911 GT1 Race Version (which is not considered to be an actual Porsche 911 due to its mid-mounted engine and overall shape). The Porsche 997 GT2 has a curb weight of 1,440 kg (3,175 lb). The only transmission available is a 6-speed manual.

The GT2 was the first Porsche equipped with launch control.

The appearance of the GT2 is slightly different from its sister-car, the 997 Turbo, in a few ways. It does away with fog lights in the front bumper and has integrated turn signals in the front air intakes, has a revised front lip, has a larger rear wing (with two small air scoops on either side), and has a different rear bumper (now featuring titanium exhaust pipes).

=== GT3 ===
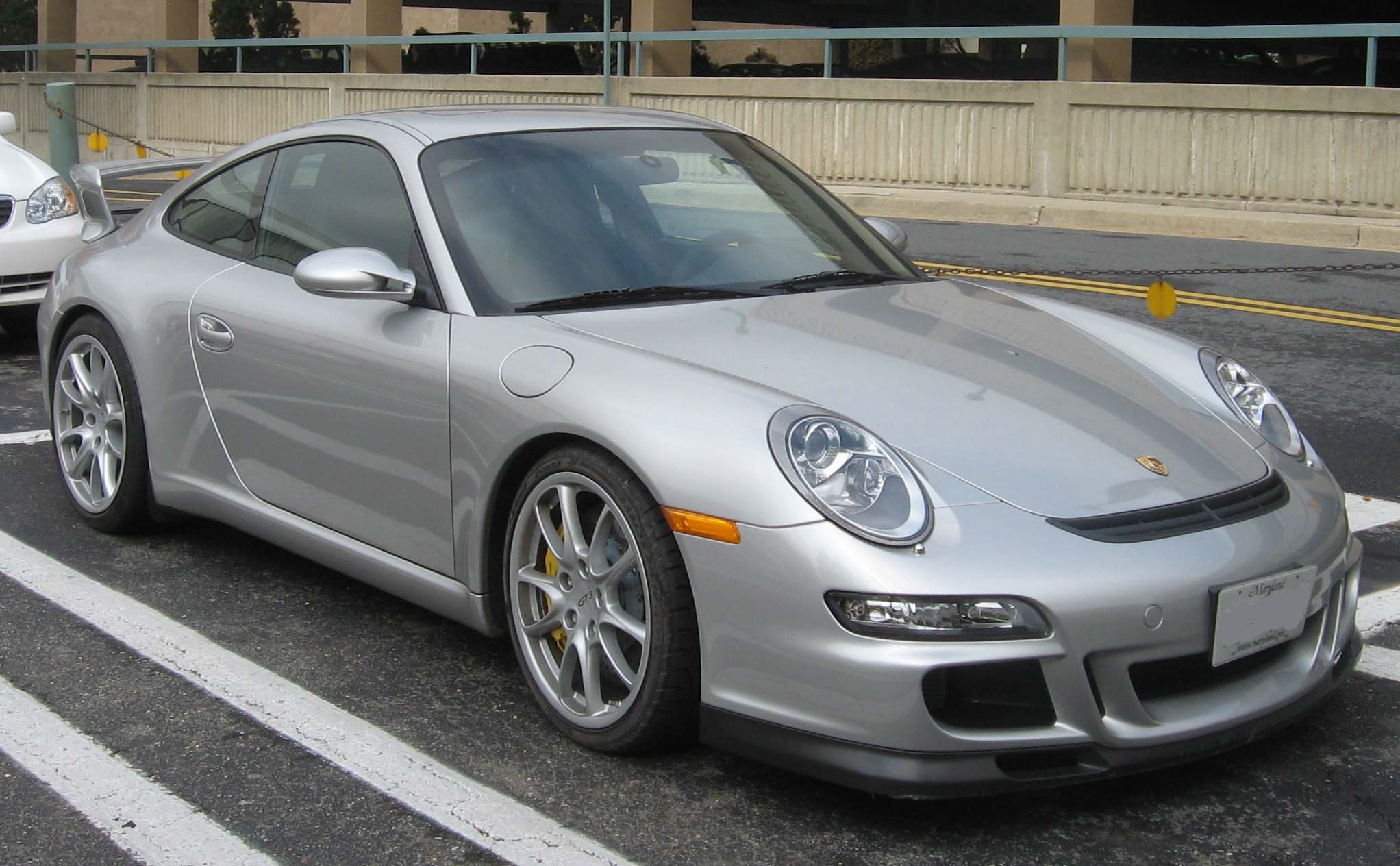
Porsche 997 GT3

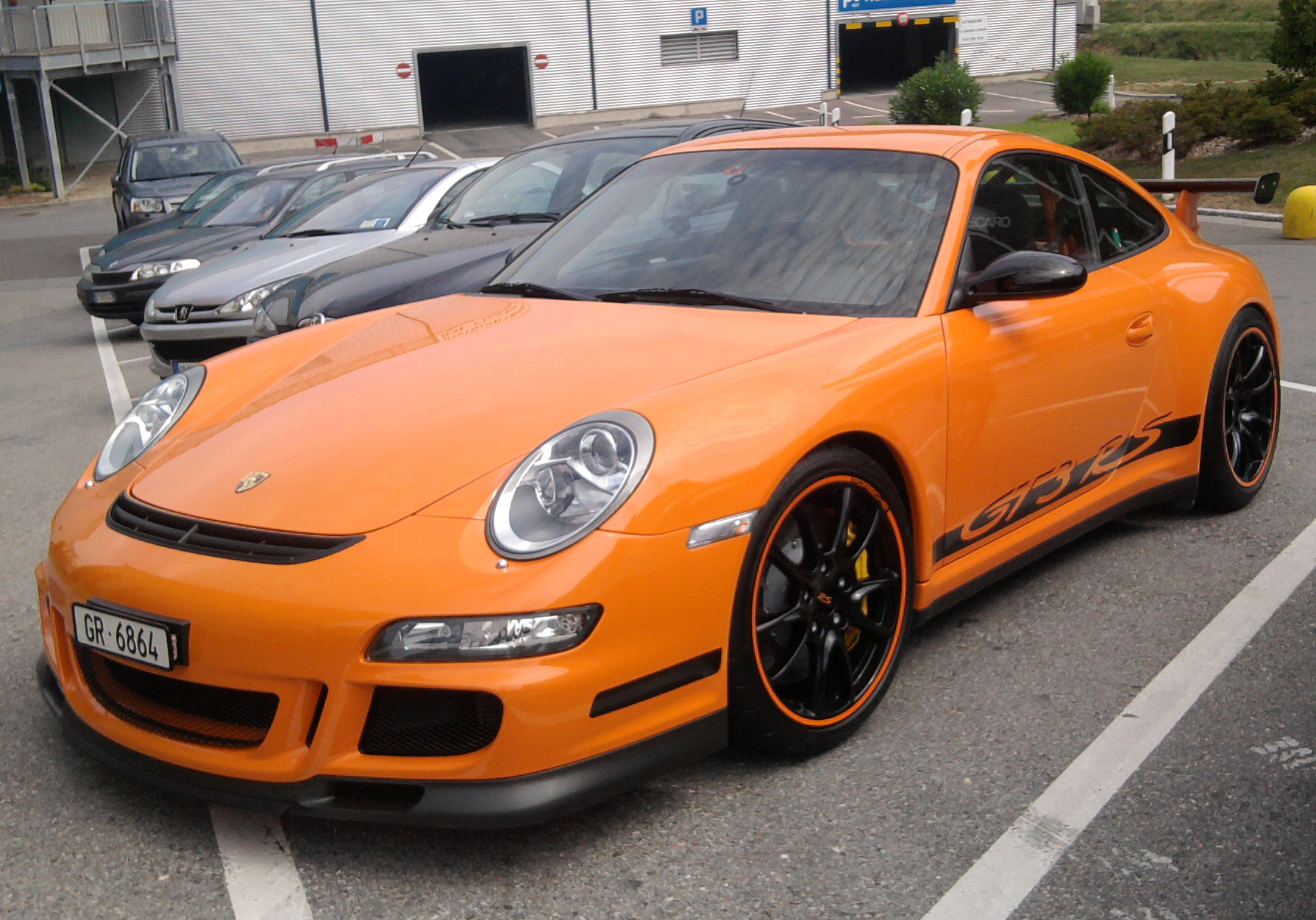
Porsche 997 GT3 RS

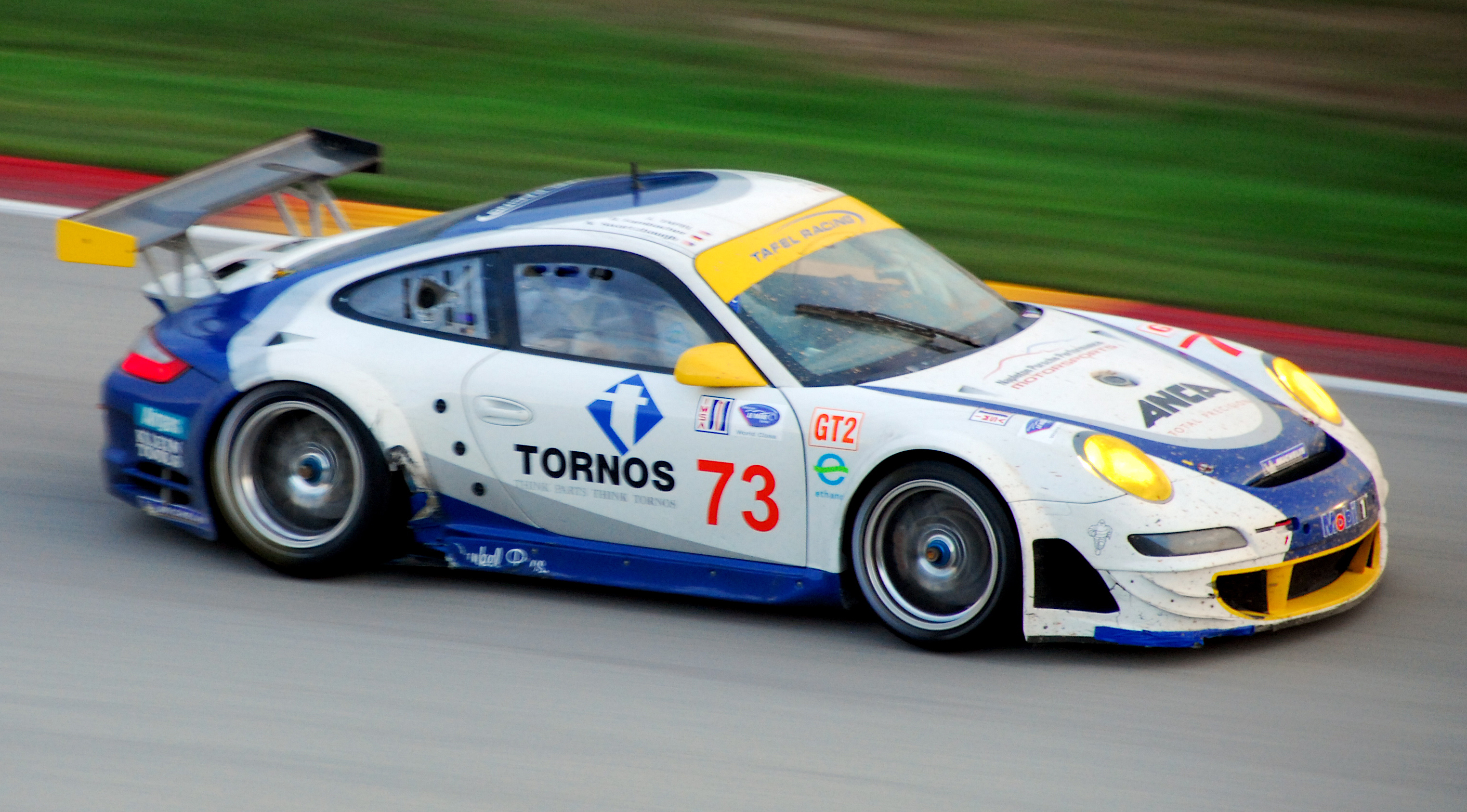
Porsche 997 GT3 RSR

The GT3 variant debuted at the 2006 Geneva Motor Show alongside the 997 Turbo. Like previous GT3 models, it is a way for Porsche to homologate aerodynamic features for racing, as well as to offer race cars for customer teams. The 997 GT3 was priced at US$106,000. The engine has the same displacement as the Turbo, but does away with the turbochargers and uses a new variable intake system. The engine is rated at 415 PS (305 kW; 409 bhp) and 405 N⋅m (299 lb⋅ft) of torque. It has an 8,400 rpm redline matching that of the Carrera GT flagship. The 3.6 L dry-sump engine does not suffer from the rear main seal problems of the earlier 3.6 L/3.8 L integrated dry-sump engines.

The GT3's body work includes a special front bumper which increases cooling for the front-mounted radiators as well as a split spoiler at the rear. The GT3 also includes a special rear bumper and center tailpipes which draw heat away from the engine. The suspension system is lowered and the car utilises 30-series 305 mm (12 in) tyres and 19 in (483 mm) wheels. The car weighs 1,395 kg (3,075 lb).

The 997 GT3 is more driver-friendly than its predecessor, with "comfort" seats and the Porsche Communication Management system installed.

The special GT3 RS model came without many of the luxuries typically found in a Carrera to focus more on track-orientated driving (although the car is still road-legal). The RS trim was also available with a full roll cage and carbon fibre seats along with a large fixed rear wing to add to the race-car-for-the-road feel. The RS trim was introduced in Europe in October 2006; the North American release was in March 2007. A racing version of the GT3 RS debuted in 2007, called the 997 GT3 RSR.

The ratios on the six-speed transmission are closer, allowing the GT3 to reach 97 km/h (60 mph) in 4.1 seconds, while the RS accomplishes the same in exactly 4 seconds. The GT3 will continue to 161 km/h (100 mph) in 9.2 seconds and has a maximum top speed of 310 km/h (193 mph).

=== Engines ===
Models	Engine	Power, torque at rpm
Carrera, Carrera 4, Targa 4	3,596 cc (3.6 L; 219.4 cu in) H6 (96x82.8 mm)	325 PS (239 kW; 321 hp) at 6,800, 370 N⋅m (273 lbf⋅ft) at 4,250
Carrera S, Carrera 4S, Targa 4S	3,824 cc (3.8 L; 233.4 cu in) H6 (99x82.8 mm)	360 PS (265 kW; 355 hp) at 6,600, 400 N⋅m (295 lbf⋅ft) at 4,600
Carrera S, Carrera 4S, Targa 4S with X51 Powerkit; Club coupé	3,824 cc (3.8 L; 233.4 cu in) H6	381 PS (280 kW; 376 hp) at 7,200, 415 N⋅m (306 lbf⋅ft) at 5,500
GT3, GT3 RS	3,600 cc (3.6 L; 220 cu in) H6 (100x76.4 mm)	415 PS (305 kW; 409 hp) at 7,600, 405 N⋅m (299 lbf⋅ft) at 5,500
Turbo*	3,600 cc (3.6 L; 220 cu in) H6 twin turbo	480 PS (353 kW; 473 hp) at 6,000, 620 N⋅m (457 lbf⋅ft) at 1,950–5,000; Overboost: 680 N⋅m (502 lbf⋅ft) at 2,100–4,000
GT2*	3,600 cc (3.6 L; 220 cu in) H6 twin turbo	530 PS (390 kW; 523 hp) at 6,500, 680 N⋅m (502 lbf⋅ft) at 2,200–4,500

"*" Models with turbocharged engines include Variable Turbine Geometry (VTG) turbochargers.

=== General performance ===
The base Carrera has essentially the same 3,596 cc (3.596 L; 219.4 cu in) flat-6 (Boxer) engine from 996 Carrera. The Carrera S however uses a new 3,824 cc (3.824 L; 233.4 cu in) flat-6 engine. The X51 Powerkit is available for S, 4S, Targa models, which increases engine power.

According to testing carried out by several American automotive publications, the Turbo model can accelerate from 0 to 100 km/h (62 mph) in about 3.3 seconds with an automatic transmission and 3.5 seconds with the manual transmission. The Carrera S model is capable of accelerating from 0–97 km/h (0–60 mph) in 4.7 seconds and can reach a top speed of 300 km/h (186 mph), while the base Carrera model can accelerate from 0–97 km/h (0–60 mph) in 4.8 seconds, and can attain a top speed of 290 km/h (180 mph). The viscous clutch all wheel drive system sends between 5% and 40% of engine torque to the front wheels as per need.

The Porsche 997 GT3 RS and Porsche 997 Carrera 4S are tied for second fastest car in history, at 82 km/h (51 mph), in the infamous moose test maneuver, beaten only by the Citroën Xantia Activa V6 record of 85 km/h (53 mph). The test is conducted by the magazine Teknikens Värld's in Sweden, as a test of avoiding a moose in the road.

== Second phase (997.2; 2009–2013) ==
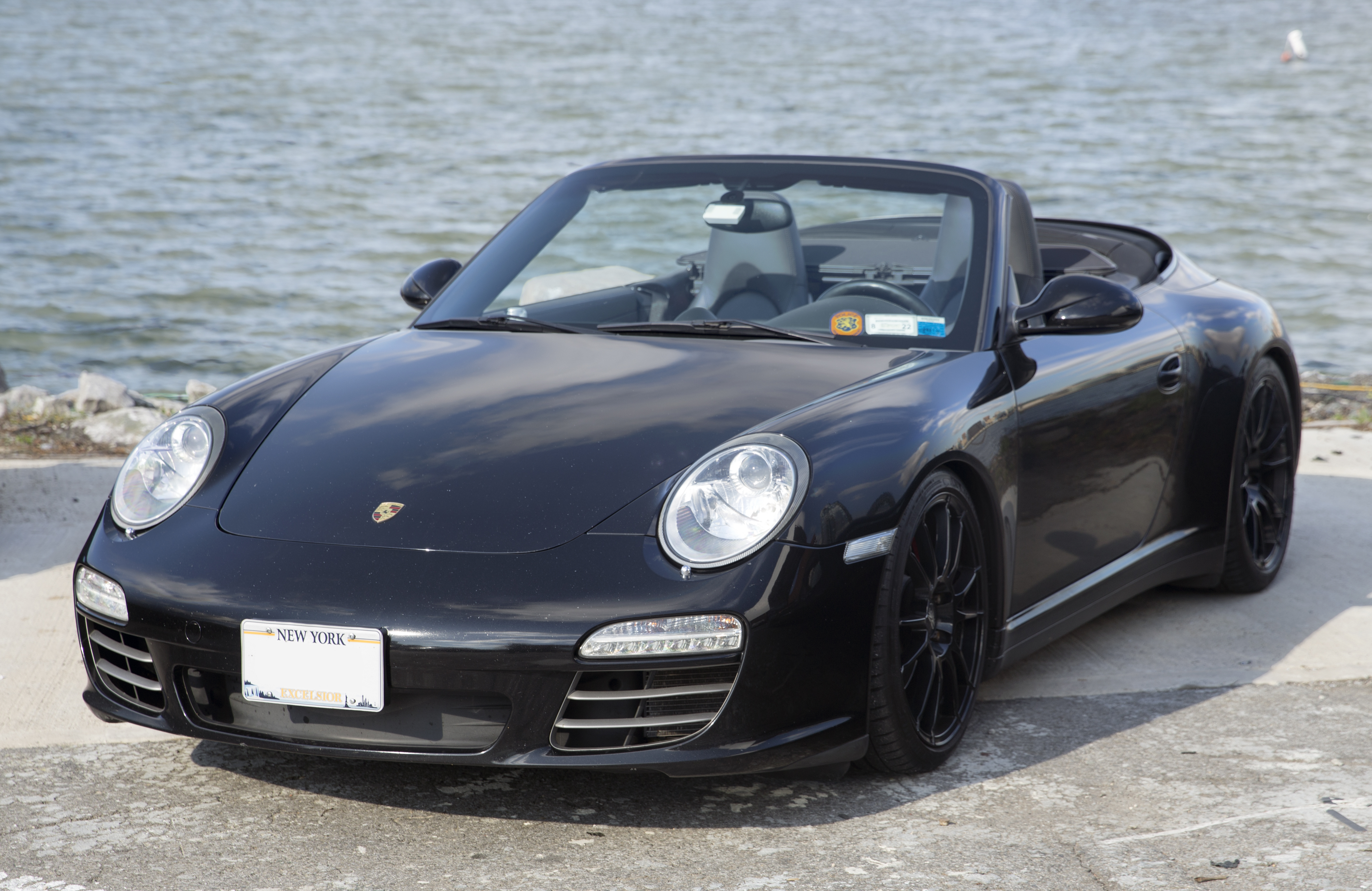

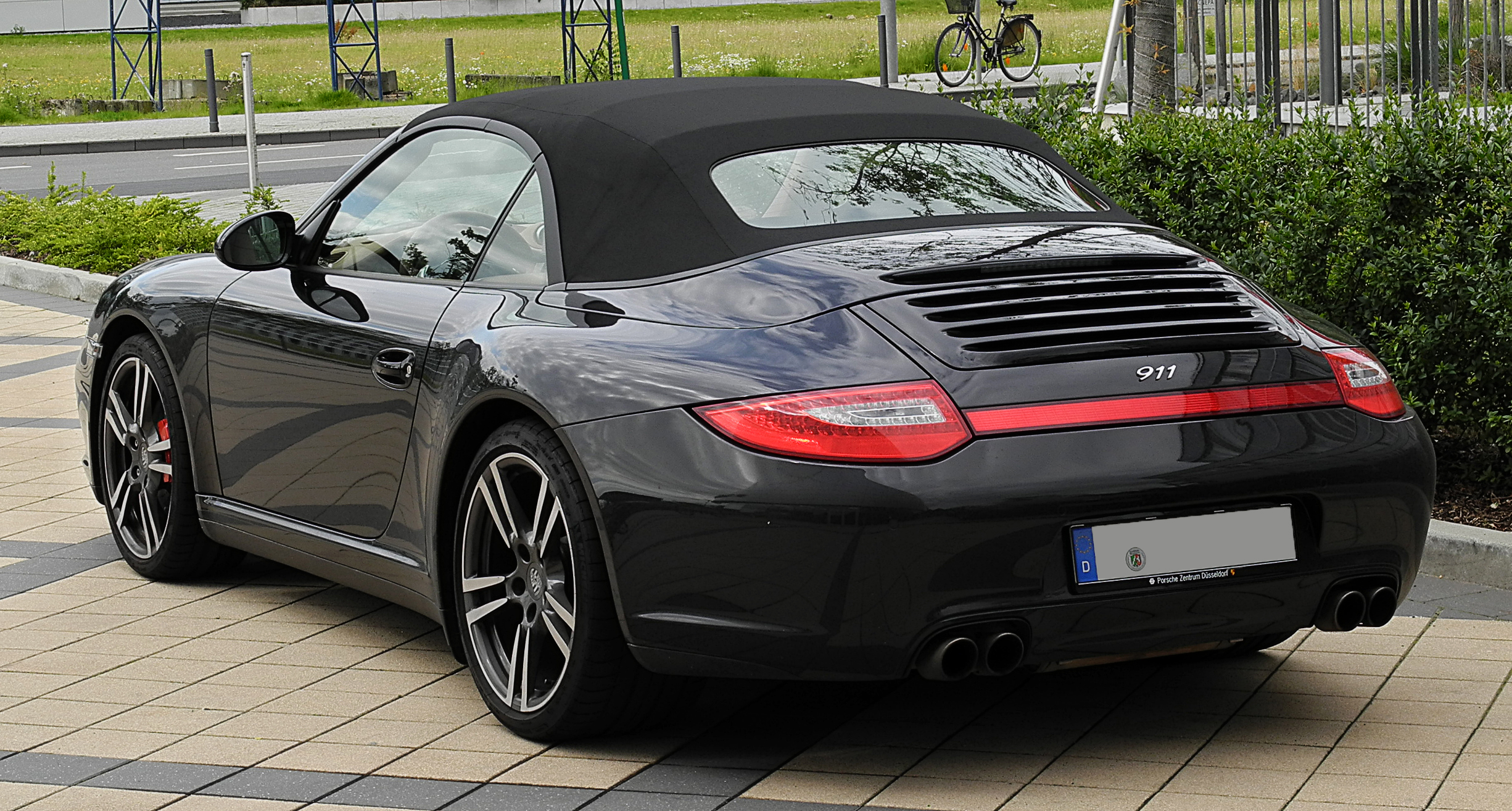
Porsche 911 convertible (post facelift)

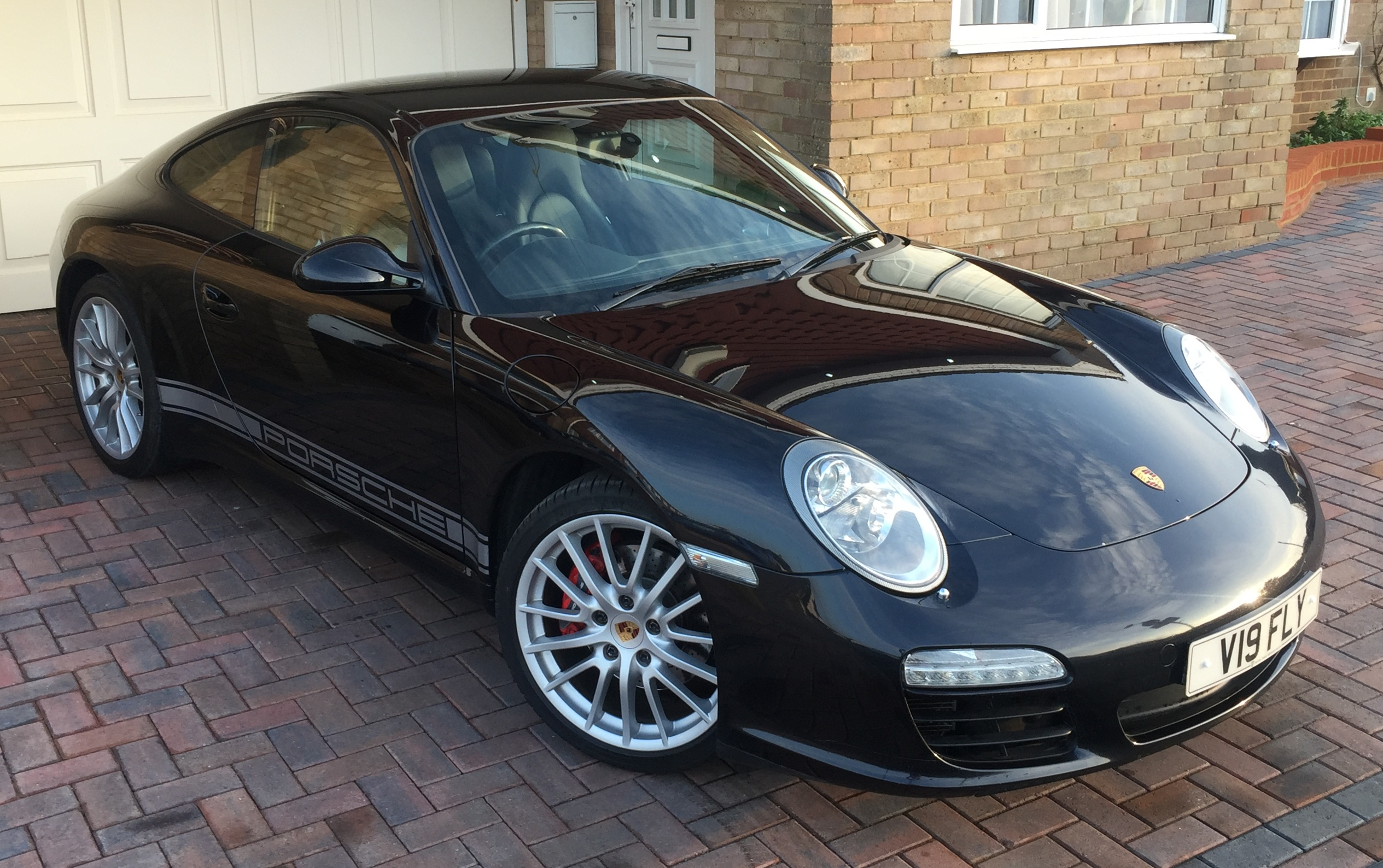

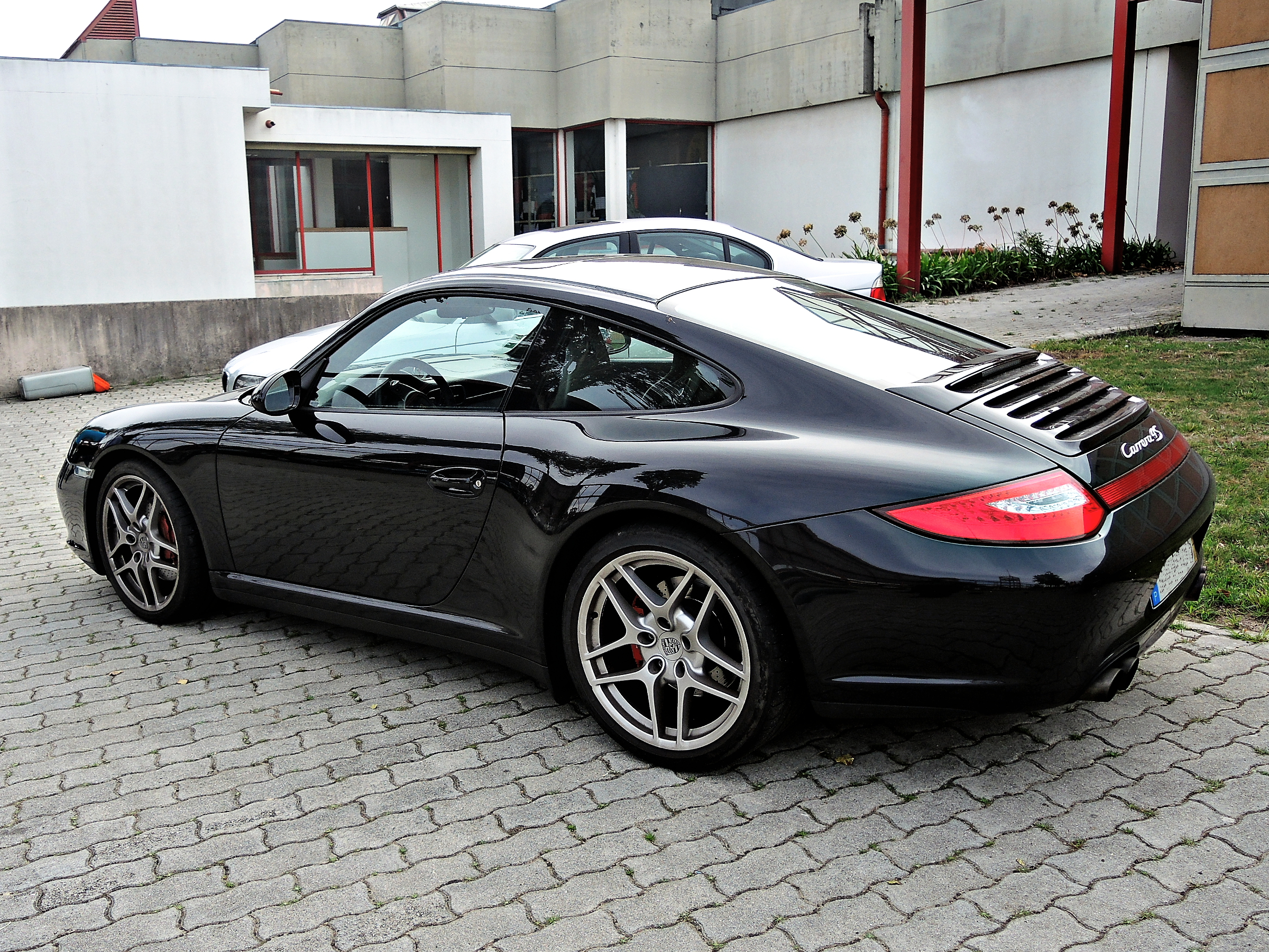
Porsche 911 coupé (post facelift)

The 997 received a mid-cycle refresh in 2008 for the 2009 model year. The updated model range was unveiled at the Paris Auto Show in September 2008. The updated Porsche 911 (called 997 Gen II internally at Porsche and 997.2 informally by enthusiasts) included the following changes:

- New engine with direct fuel injection. The engine is mounted 0.4 inches (10 mm) lower in the tail section
- Revised suspension system
- Revised front bumper with larger air intakes
- Headlamps with LED daytime running lights and newly optional dual HID projectors
- Revised rear bumper with a new LED tail light design; AWD models included a reflective stripe between the tail lights
- Enlarged exterior mirrors
- Redesigned Porsche Sports Exhaust (PSE)
- Redesigned PCM system with touch-screen and optional hard-drive navigation and Bluetooth.
- New Porsche Doppelkupplungsgetriebe (PDK) transmission replacing the optional Tiptronic S.

Production of the 997 Gen II model began in late 2008. Initially available models included coupé and cabriolet versions of the Carrera, Carrera 4, Carrera S and Carrera 4S. Pricing was increased from the 997 Gen I; the base Carrera model was set to start at US$76,300 for North American buyers.

On 6 June 2008, these changes to the Porsche 911 were revealed on the Porsche website. The Turbo was not revealed until the Frankfurt Motor Show in September, thereafter the Turbo-based GT2 received the updated changes.

In 2009, Porsche introduced 997.2 Carrera 4S Pon Edition as a tribute of 60 years of partnership between Porsche and Pon's Automobielhandel. The car was available only in Netherlands as coupé and Cabriolet. The body was painted in Diamond Black color. On the back, there's no Carrera 4S badging, just a big Porsche lettering. The car also has Dark grey rims and Sport exhaust system. Just 15 coupé and 15 cabriolets were made.

In 2011, Porsche showed 911 Carrera 4S Porsche Centrum Gelderland Edition. Porsche only sold this edition in Netherlands, among which were 2 coupés, 2 Cabriolets and 1 Targa. The paintjob was done in Slate Metallic color. The interior was done in Cocoa leather. Also the car has a Sport Exhaust system.

=== Models ===
Model	MSRP (Cost USD)	Horsepower, engine	0–60 mph 0–97 km/h*	Top speed
911 Carrera	$77,800	345 PS (254 kW; 340 bhp) at 6,500 rpm, 3.6 L Flat-6 with integrated dry sump	4.7 seconds	290 km/h (180 mph)
911 Carrera S	$90,500	385 PS (283 kW; 380 bhp) at 6,500 rpm, 3.8 L Flat-6 with integrated dry sump	4.5 seconds	303 km/h (188 mph)
911 Carrera Cabriolet	$87,000	345 PS (254 kW; 340 bhp) at 6,500 rpm, 3.6 L Flat-6 with integrated dry sump	4.9 seconds	290 km/h (180 mph)
911 Carrera S Cabriolet	$97,700	385 PS (283 kW; 380 bhp) at 6,500 rpm, 3.8 L Flat-6 with integrated dry sump	4.7 seconds	303 km/h (188 mph)
911 Carrera 4	$82,500	345 PS (254 kW; 340 bhp) at 6,500 rpm, 3.6 L Flat-6 with integrated dry sump	4.8 seconds	285 km/h (177 mph)
911 Carrera 4S	$93,200	385 PS (283 kW; 380 bhp) at 6,500 rpm, 3.8 L Flat-6 with integrated dry sump	4.5 seconds	298 km/h (185 mph)
911 Carrera 4 Cabriolet	$93,200	345 PS (254 kW; 340 bhp) at 6,500 rpm, 3.6 L Flat-6 with integrated dry sump	5.0 seconds	285 km/h (177 mph)
911 Carrera 4S Cabriolet	$103,900	385 PS (283 kW; 380 bhp) at 6,500 rpm, 3.8 L Flat-6 with integrated dry sump	4.7 seconds	298 km/h (185 mph)
911 Targa 4	$90,400	345 PS (254 kW; 340 bhp) at 6,500 rpm, 3.6 L Flat-6 with integrated dry sump	5.0 seconds	285 km/h (177 mph)
911 Targa 4S	$101,100	385 PS (283 kW; 380 bhp) at 6,500 rpm, 3.8 L Flat-6 with integrated dry sump	4.7 seconds	298 km/h (185 mph)
911 Turbo	$132,800	500 PS (368 kW; 493 bhp) at 6,000 rpm, 3.8 L twin-turbocharged Flat-6 with dry sump	3.0 seconds	312 km/h (194 mph)
911 Turbo S	$160,700	530 PS (390 kW; 523 bhp) at 6,250–6750 rpm, 3.8 L twin-turbocharged Flat-6 with dry sump	2.7 seconds	315 km/h (196 mph)
911 Turbo Cabriolet	$142,800	500 PS (368 kW; 493 bhp) at 6,000 rpm, 3.8 L twin-turbocharged Flat-6 with dry sump	3.2 seconds	312 km/h (194 mph)
911 Turbo S Cabriolet	$172,100	530 PS (390 kW; 523 bhp) at 6,250–6750 rpm, 3.8 L twin-turbocharged Flat-6 with dry sump	2.9 seconds	315 km/h (196 mph)
911 GT3	$115,700	435 PS (320 kW; 429 bhp) at 7,600 rpm, 3.8 L Flat-6 with dry sump	4.0 seconds	312 km/h (194 mph)
911 GT3 RS	$135,500	450 PS (331 kW; 444 bhp) at 7,600 rpm, 3.8 L Flat-6 with dry sump	3.8 seconds	311 km/h (193 mph)
911 GT3 RS 4.0	$180,000	500 PS (368 kW; 493 bhp) at 8,500 rpm, 4.0 L Flat-6 with dry sump	3.8 seconds	311 km/h (193 mph)
911 GT2 RS	$245,000	620 PS (456 kW; 612 bhp) at 6,500 rpm, 3.6 L twin-turbocharged Flat-6 with dry sump	3.3 seconds	330 km/h (205 mph)

Notes:

- MSRP prices are set to the United States. In Europe, prices are considerably higher and in some countries can even be double the price quoted for North American markets, mainly due to higher local tax rates.
- Integrated dry sump in all but GT3, GT3 RS, GT2 RS variants which have a dry sump with external oil reservoir and 7 pumps instead of only 3 in the less powerful versions.
- Integrated dry sump is Porsche's name for a dry sump lubrication system integrated within the engine block, i.e. no separate oil reservoir.

=== Targa (2009–2012) ===
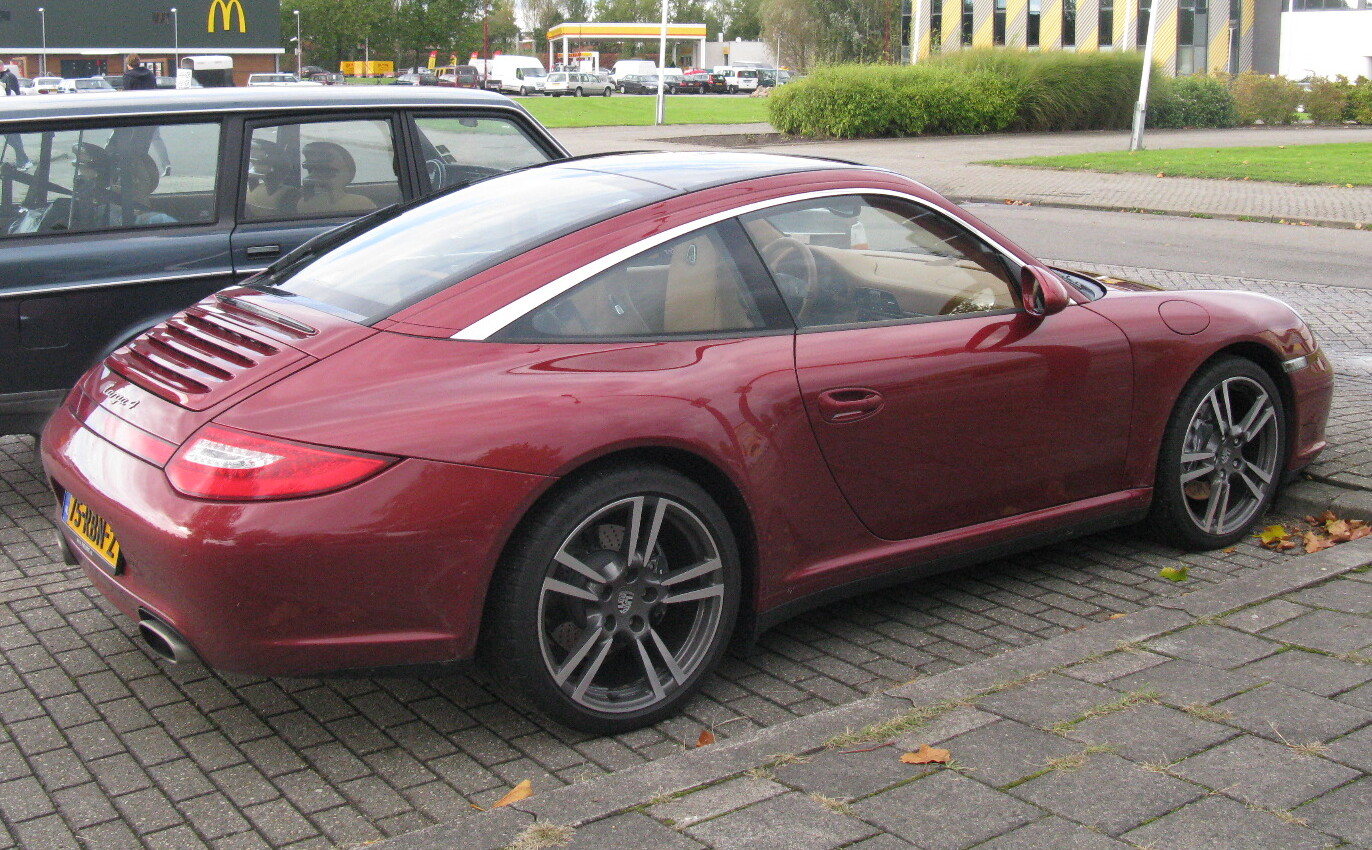
Porsche 997 Targa 4

The updated Targa 4 and Targa 4S models were announced on 28 July 2008. The Targa now had a glass roof made of a special glass that repelled UV rays from entering the car. The engine in the Targa 4 was now uprated at 345 PS (254 kW; 340 bhp) while for the Targa 4S, power was increased to 385 PS (283 kW; 380 hp). The new Targa 4S has a top speed of 185 mph (298 km/h) and can accelerate from 0–97 km/h (0–60 mph) in 4.7 seconds, while the Targa 4 has a lower top speed.

=== Turbo/Turbo Cabriolet (2010–2013) ===
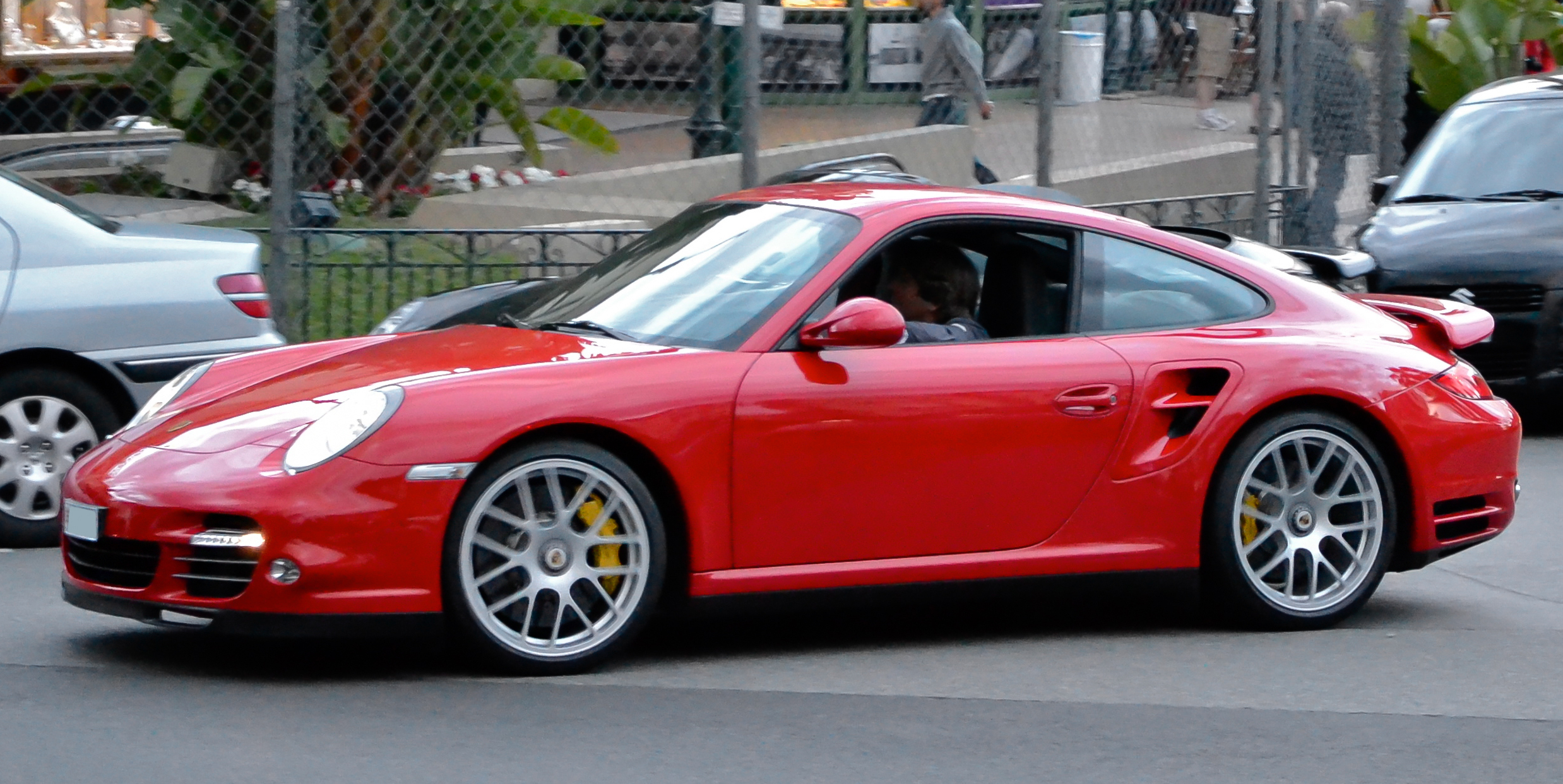

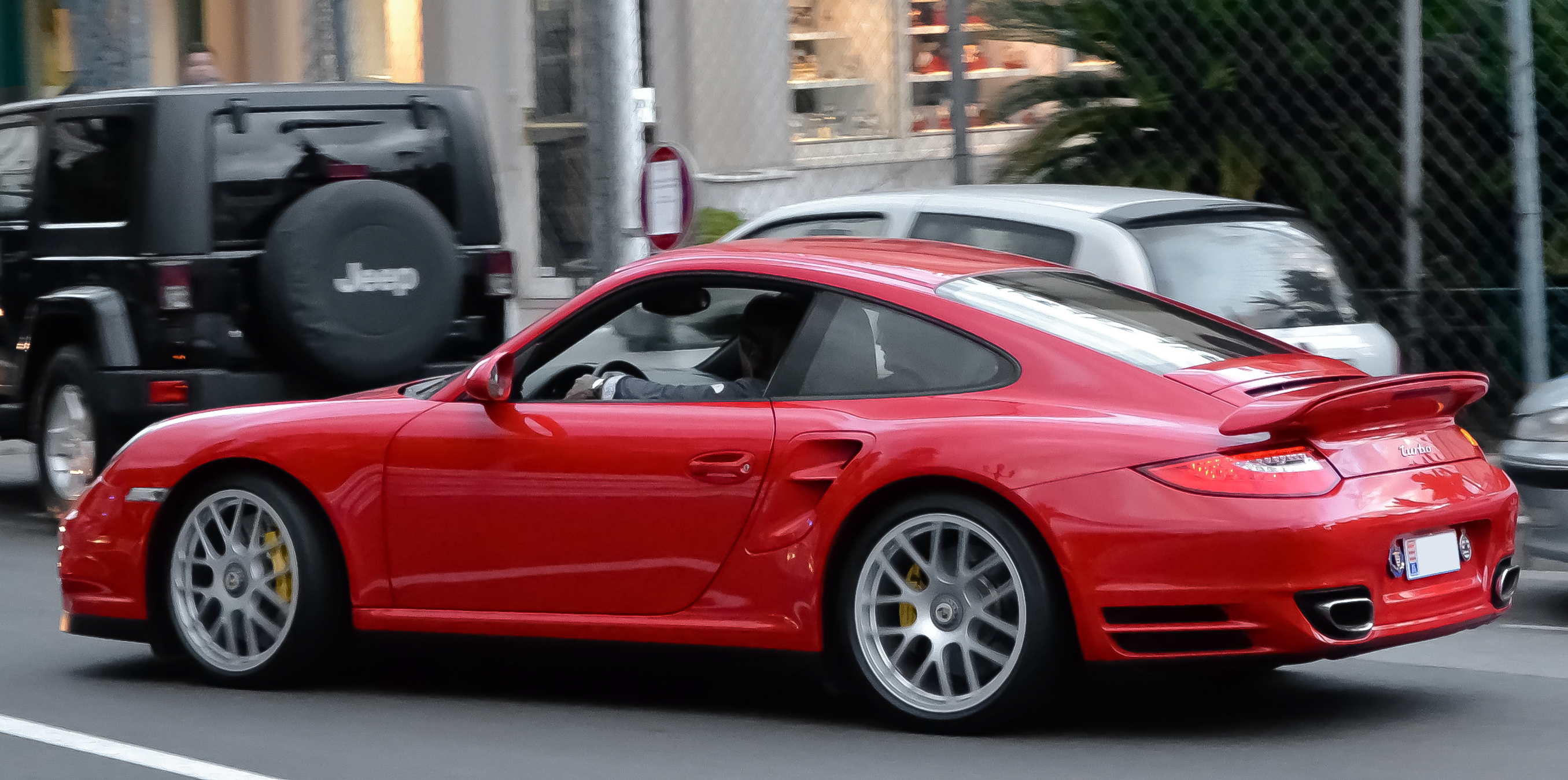
Porsche 997 Turbo

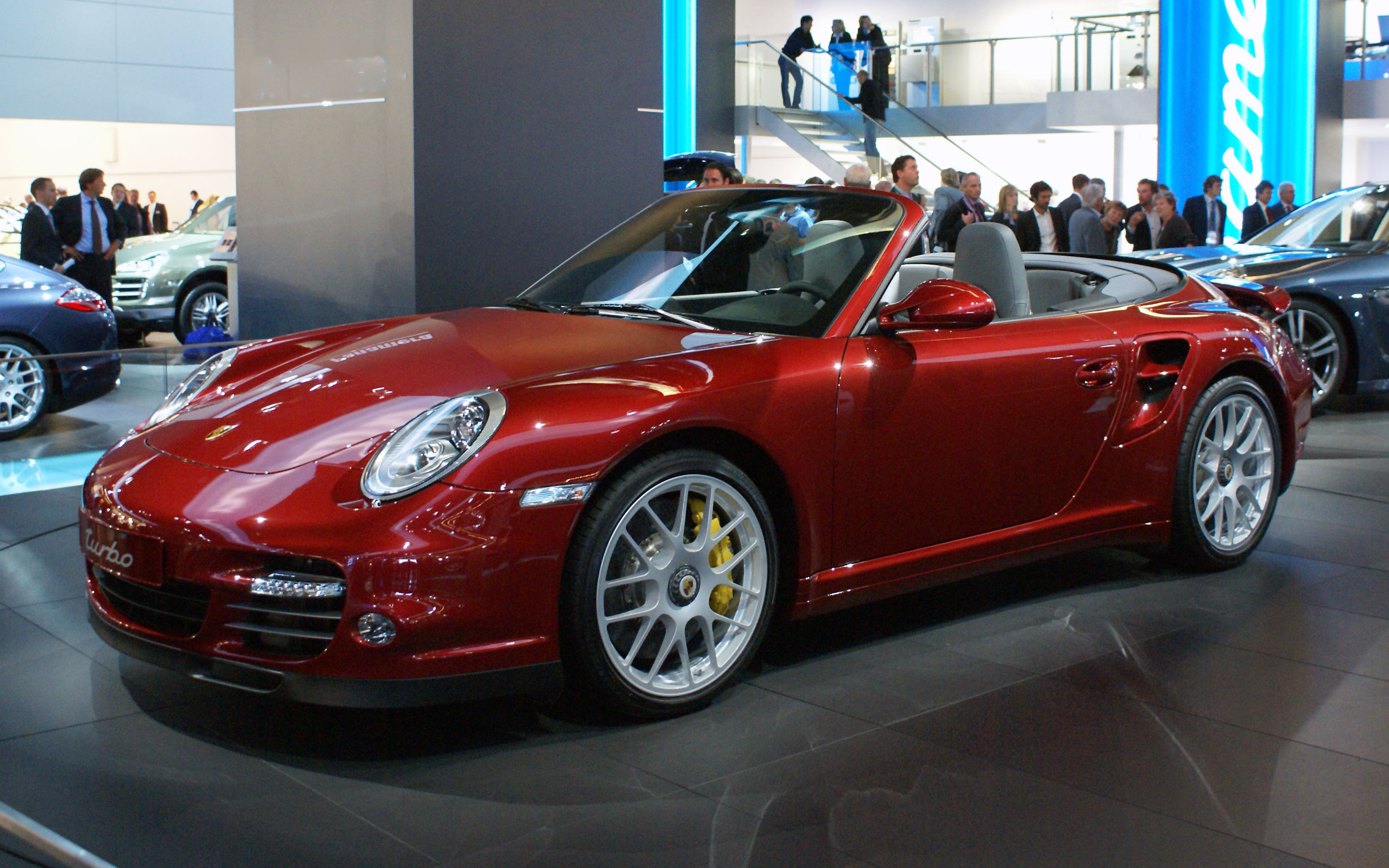
2010 Porsche 997 Turbo cabriolet

The refreshed version of the 997 Turbo was unveiled at the 2009 Frankfurt Motor Show. It received a completely new 6-cylinder, 3.8-litre boxer engine generating a maximum power output of 500 PS (368 kW; 493 bhp) and 651 N⋅m (480 lb⋅ft) of torque (700 N⋅m (516 lb⋅ft) with overboost) using revised BorgWarner variable turbine geometry (VTG) turbochargers. The new engine shared the construction of other 997 Gen II DFI engines. The 997 Gen I engine's Nikasil cylinder liners were replaced with an Alusil block that combined the cylinders and crankcase into an integrated casting for each bank, thus reducing weight (in contrast to a separate cylinder block and crankcase for each bank). The dry sump lubrication system in the Turbo is different from other 911 models in that it uses integrated oil reservoirs at the bottom of the engine, separate from the crank case and utilises six oil pumps. The engine is configured with direct fuel injection and a compression ratio of 9.8:1. The intake manifold is a slightly larger unit, adopted from the outgoing GT2 along with slightly larger intake valves, wheels for the Turbochargers, and intercoolers. The exhaust system is also more refined and aids in the power increase while improving fuel economy. The overall result is an engine that is 10 kg (22 lb) lighter than the previous engine and has a peak turbo-boost of 11.6 psi (a decrease from the outgoing model).

The suspension system was also revised and had new software to enhance handling. The BorgWarner all-wheel-drive system received new software for more linear delivery of power to the front wheels.

The Turbo was available with a manual transmission or the optional 7-speed PDK dual-clutch gearbox, which replaced the Tiptronic. With PDK and the optional sport-chrono package, which includes the availability of an electronically controlled launch control and an overboost-function for temporarily increasing the turbo-pressure, Porsche claimed the 911 Turbo would accelerate from 0–100 km/h (0–62 mph) in 3.4 seconds and attain a top-speed of 312 km/h (194 mph). Motor Trend tested the Turbo in 2010 and achieved 0–60 mph (0–97 km/h) in 2.8 seconds, 0.6 of a second quicker than Porsche's claim. The model was also available with optional Porsche Torque Vectoring (PTV), which brakes the inner rear wheel to provide turning-torque through a curve reducing initial under steer. The look of the refreshed Gen II model was left mostly untouched from the 997 turbo Gen I. The taillights were updated to LED to match the 997 Gen II along with changes to the front lamps. The exhaust pipes were "fatter", and the standard 19 in wheels received a new design. Thanks to revised dynamics the facelifted 997 can handle 1.3 g forces on a skid-pad according to Porsche.

Models equipped with the PDK also include an optional 3-spoke steering wheel with gearshift paddles as an alternative to the standard steering wheel with shift buttons.

Production versions went on sale in Germany in November 2009. European models had an MSRP of €122,400 for the Coupé and €131,800 for the Cabriolet (before tax).

==== Turbo S (2010–2013) ====
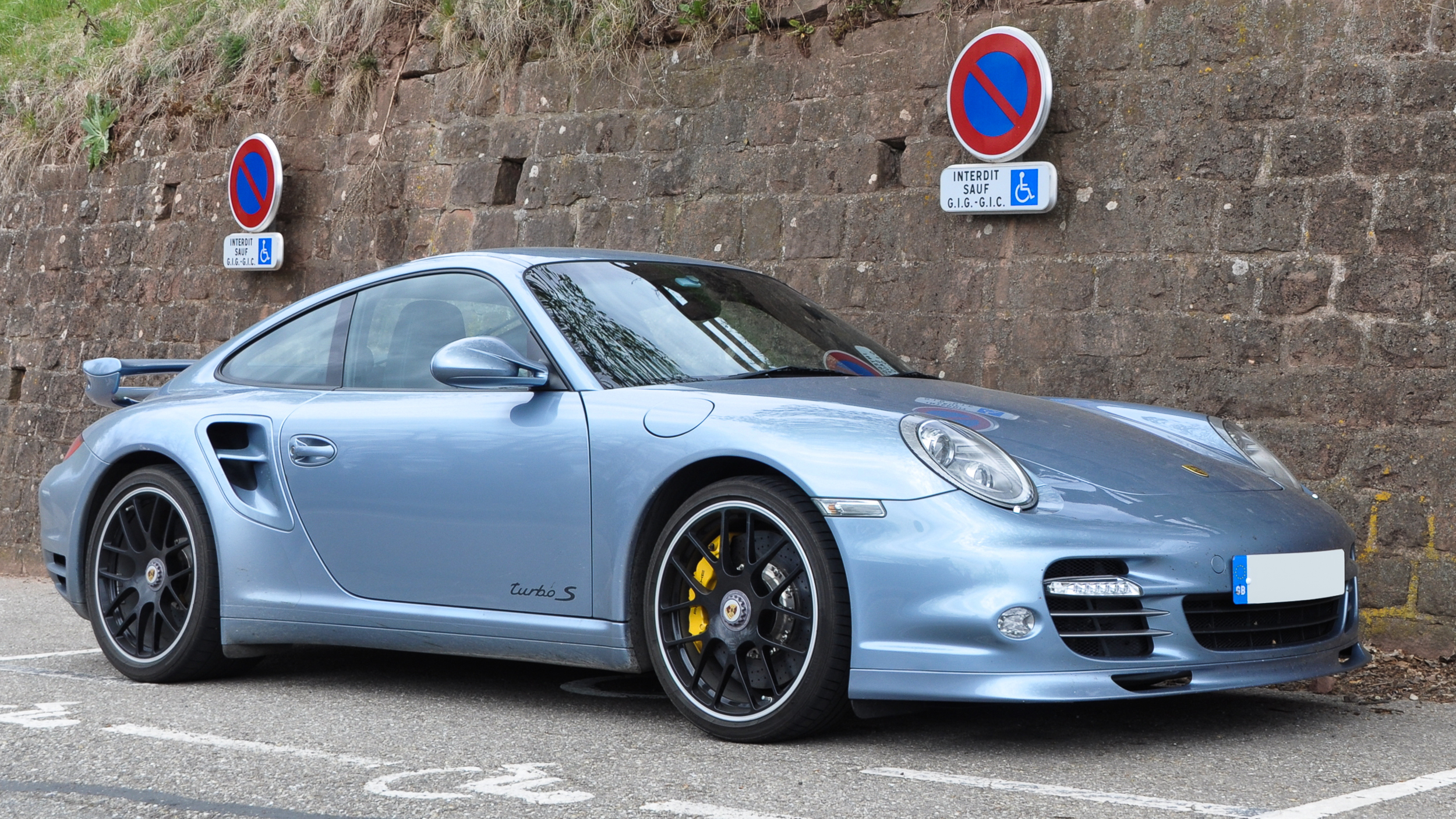
997 Turbo S

A more powerful version of the Turbo called the Turbo S (S standing for Sport) was unveiled at the Geneva Motor Show in March 2010. European deliveries were scheduled for May 2010 with production ending in early 2013. Available only with the 7-speed PDK transmission, the engine in the Turbo S was tuned to generate an extra power output of 30 PS (22 kW; 30 bhp) more than the standard Turbo, bringing the total to 530 PS (390 kW; 523 bhp) at 6,000 rpm and 700 N⋅m (516 lb⋅ft) of torque. The engine had revised intake valve timing and a new carbon fibre airbox installed to achieve this feat. The Turbo S also gained carbon-ceramic brakes and the Sport Chrono package as standard features. The Turbo S was Porsche's fastest production car to date at the time of its introduction alongside the GT2 RS, having a 0–100 km/h (0–62 mph) acceleration time of 2.7 seconds and 0–200 km/h (0–124 mph) acceleration time of 9.6 seconds while ultimately reaching a maximum speed of 315 km/h (196 mph). Maximum torque was available between 2,100 rpm and 4,250 rpm. The 911 Turbo S, by contrast to the regular Turbo, was configured to operate with a higher boost pressure level, which meant that maximum torque was available for an unlimited period.

In 2011, Porsche showed 911 Turbo S 10 Years Anniversary Edition China to celebrate 10 years of Porsche in China. The exterior is done Gold Bronze Metallic combined with matte carbon elements such as hood or rear spoiler. Also the car has black over silver Sport Classic Fuchs rims. The interior is done in black leather and alcantara with gold stitching and carbon parts. Just 10 cars were produced.

In 2012, 911 Turbo S 918 Spyder Edition was introduced. It was obviously a tribute to 918 Spyder hypercar and was only available for 918 Spyder owners. This Edition had acid green accents on brake calipers, side doors lettering, side mirrors, badging and interior stitching. Also car had some carbon fiber accents such as side air intakes. The car could be ordered as a Coupe or a Cabriolet, 918 cars were produced.

=== GT3 (2010–2012) ===
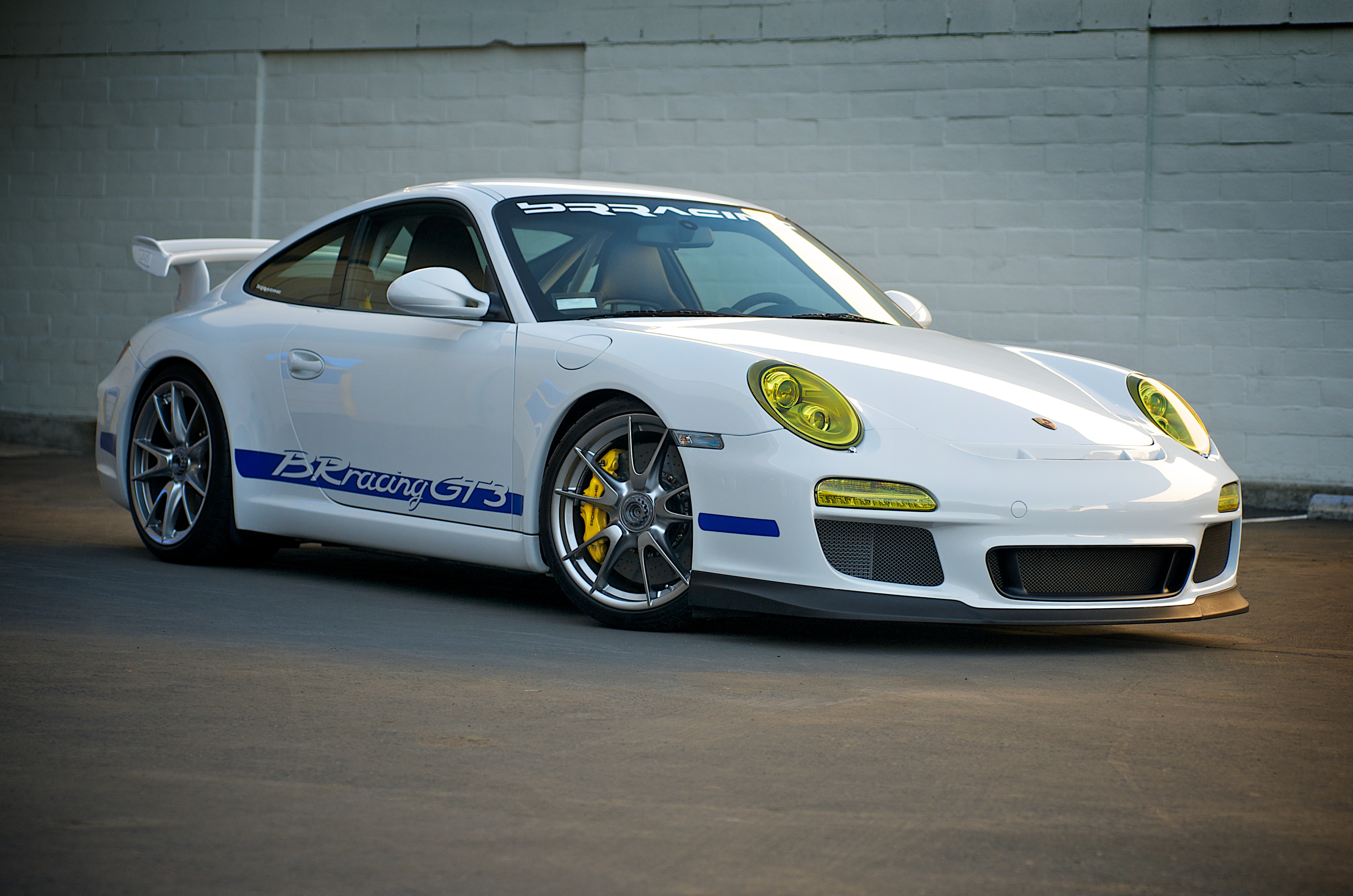
Porsche 997 GT3 (2010)

The updated Porsche 911 GT3 was unveiled at the 2009 Geneva Motor Show, and became available in Europe starting in May, and in the US starting in October. The car now featured vents between the tail lights, a larger rear wing with "3.8" lettering on either side of the wing to denote the increase in engine displacement, forged pistons, lightweight valves and hollow camshafts in order to make the engine light weight, a special 6-speed manual transmission was the only transmission option with shorter gear ratios in order to feed optimum power to the rear wheels. Total downforce was doubled, and for the first time stability control was offered to help less experienced drivers. The new 3.8-litre flat-6 engine was now rated at 435 PS (320 kW; 429 bhp) at 7,600 rpm and 430 N⋅m (317 lb⋅ft) at 6,250 rpm with a maximum engine speed of 8,500 rpm. The sport mode when activated, delivers an additional 19.9 N⋅m (14.7 lb⋅ft) of torque to the rear wheels.

==== Equipment ====
The GT3 and GT3 RS were developed by Porsche's Motorsport Division in Weissach. Sales began in September 2009 for all regions except China. Features included titanium double exhaust pipes, carbon fibre rear spoiler lip (Gurney flap) and rear lid ram air scoop, carbon fibre front above bumper air outlet and rear-view mirrors, aluminium 19in forged alloy wheels made specifically for the car with central locking nuts. The GT3 was available with Michelin Pilot Sport Cup tyres having a size of 235/35-19 at the front and 305/30-19 at the rear. A roll cage and a fire extinguisher were optional in the UK.

=== GT3 RS (2010–2012) ===
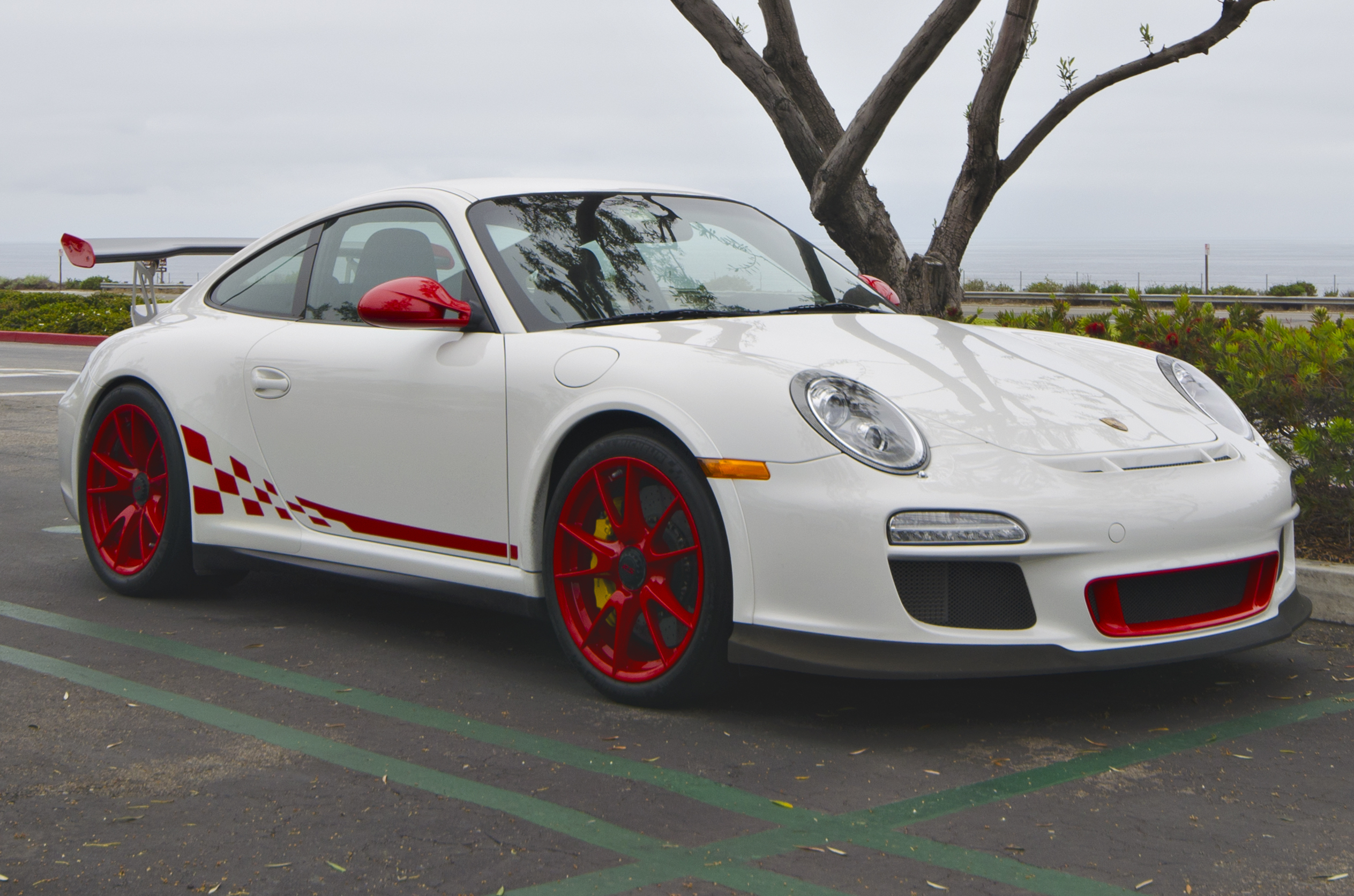

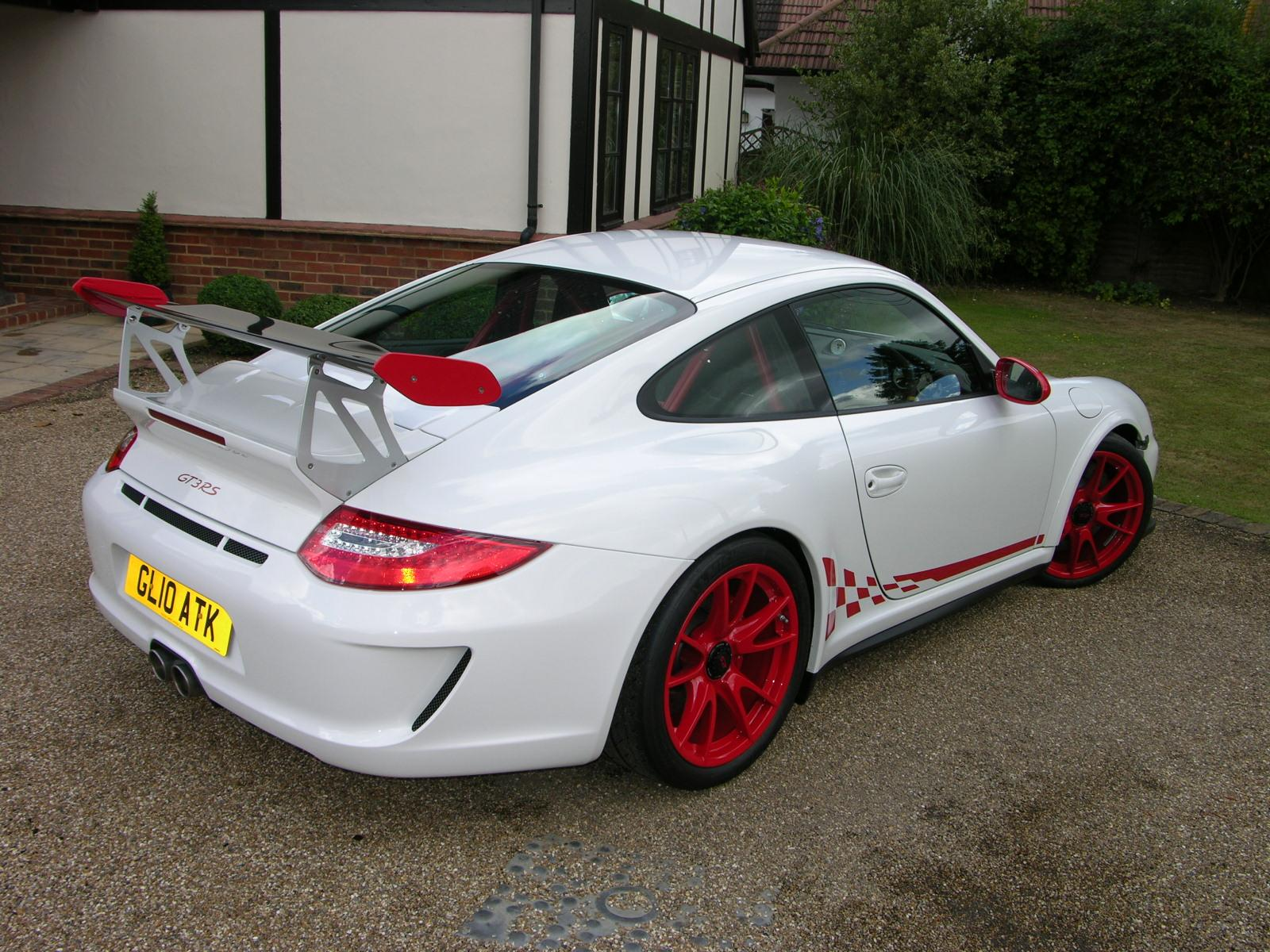
Porsche 997 GT3 RS (2010)

The GT3 RS is a high performance version of the GT3 with a higher engine power output, lower weight and shorter transmission ratios, as well as having upgraded body and suspension components, designed for homologating the race version of the 911 GT3. The engine was rated at 450 PS (331 kW; 444 bhp) at 7,900 rpm and 430 N⋅m (317 lb⋅ft) at 6,750 rpm with a maximum engine speed of 8,500 rpm. The "RS" stands for "rennsport", the German word for "racing" (literally, "race sport").

The transmission has shorter ratios than found in the 911 GT3 for improved acceleration. Dynamic engine mounts are standard and serve to improve the car's handling to an even higher level. Other features include PASM suspension, titanium connecting rods, a wider front and rear track, a large fixed rear wing made from carbon fibre, a standard roll cage, and corresponding decals.

Optional equipment included a lithium-ion battery, which is 10 kg (22 lb) lighter than the stock lead-acid battery. The vehicle was unveiled at the 2009 Frankfurt Motor Show. The US model was set to go on sale in early spring of 2010 with an MSRP of US$132,800.

=== GT3 Cup (2009) ===
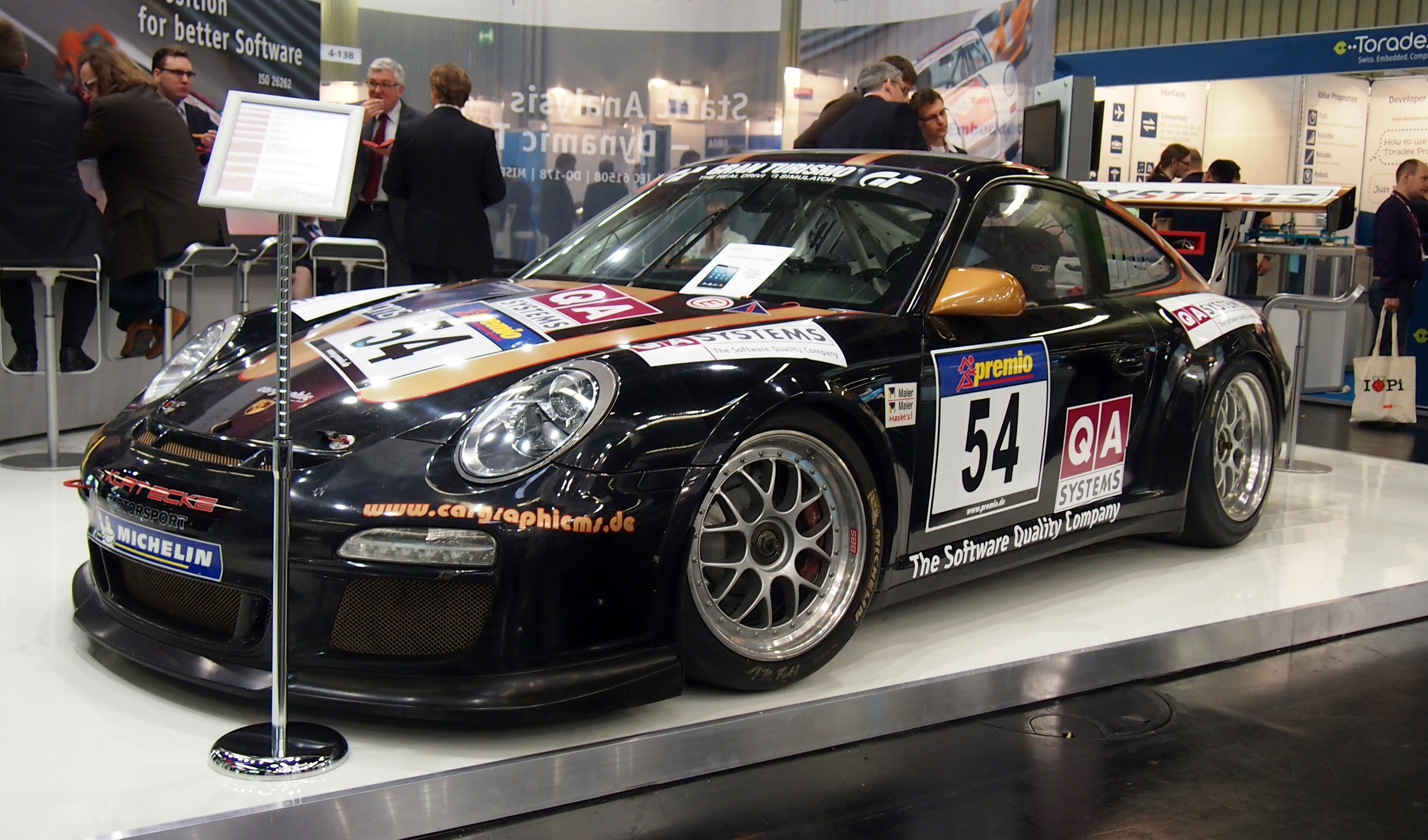
Porsche 997 GT3 Cup

Unveiled at the 2009 Frankfurt Motor Show, the GT3 Cup is a Porsche Carrera Cup race car based on the 911 GT3 RS. It includes a 44 mm (1.7 in) wider rear body, 15 mm (0.59 in) lower front spoiler, 1.70 m (67 in) rear wing (from the 911 GT3 Cup S race car), LED taillights, a racing exhaust system with a fully controlled catalytic converter (from Porsche Mobil1 Supercup cars), Porsche Ceramic Composite Brakes. 9.5Jx18 front alloy wheels with 24/64-18 Michelin racing tyres and 12Jx18 alloy wheels with 27/68-18 tyres, additional Unibal joints on the track control arms and front and rear sword-shaped anti-roll bars with seven position settings each, an additional vent in the upper part of the front lid, steering wheel mounted Info Display with 6 switches.

Production model began delivery in 2009–2010. European model had a base MSRP of €149,850 (before tax).

=== 911 Sport Classic (2010–2011) ===
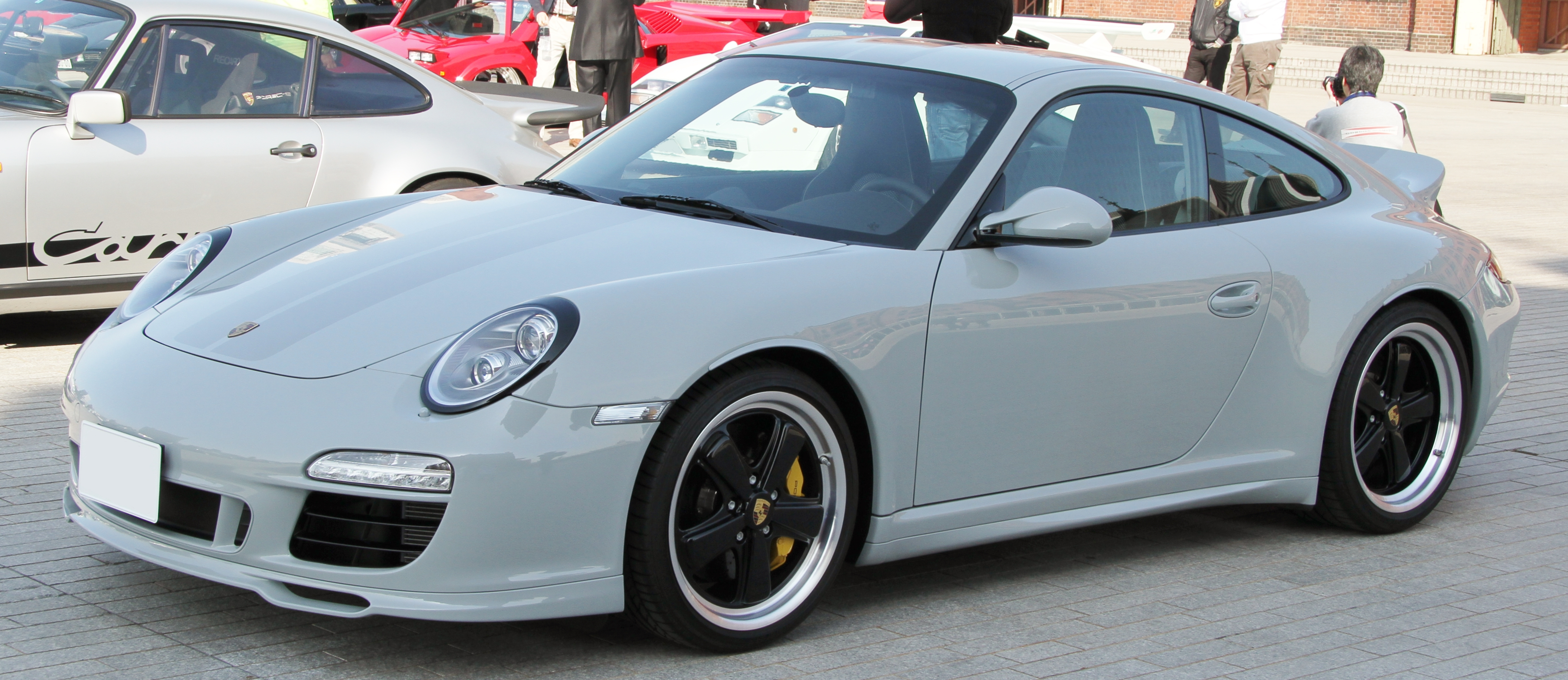

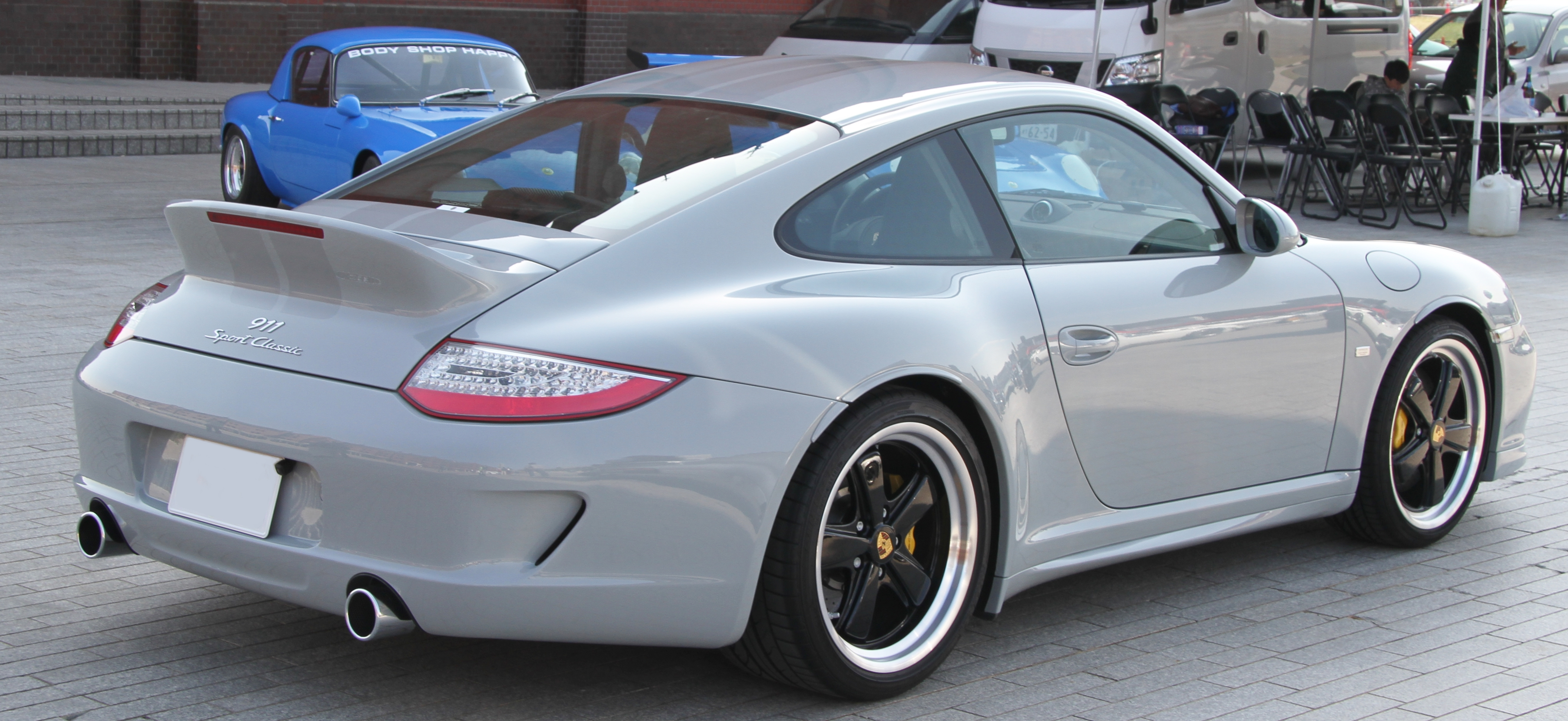
Porsche 997 Sport Classic

Unveiled at the 2009 Frankfurt Auto show, the Sport Classic is a limited (250 units—all sold in under 48 hours) version of the 911 Carrera S coupé, inspired by the 1973 Carrera RS 2.7. The engine is rated at 408 PS (300 kW; 402 bhp) and features a newly developed resonance intake manifold with 6 vacuum-controlled switching flaps. It includes a 6-speed manual transmission, double-dome roof (informally called double bubble roof), 44 mm (1.7 in) wider rear fenders, SportDesign front apron with a front spoiler and a fixed 'duck tail' rear wing (similar to the one found on the Carrera RS 2.7), Porsche Ceramic Composite Braking system (PCCB), 20 mm (0.8 in) lower PASM sports suspension, mechanical rear axle differential, 19-inch black Fuchs wheels, Porsche Exclusive woven leather seats and door panels, dashboard with Espresso Nature natural leather upholstery, and a specially developed Sport Classic Grey body colour.

Sales began in January 2010. European models had base MSRP of €169,300 (before tax).

=== 911 GT2 RS (2010) ===
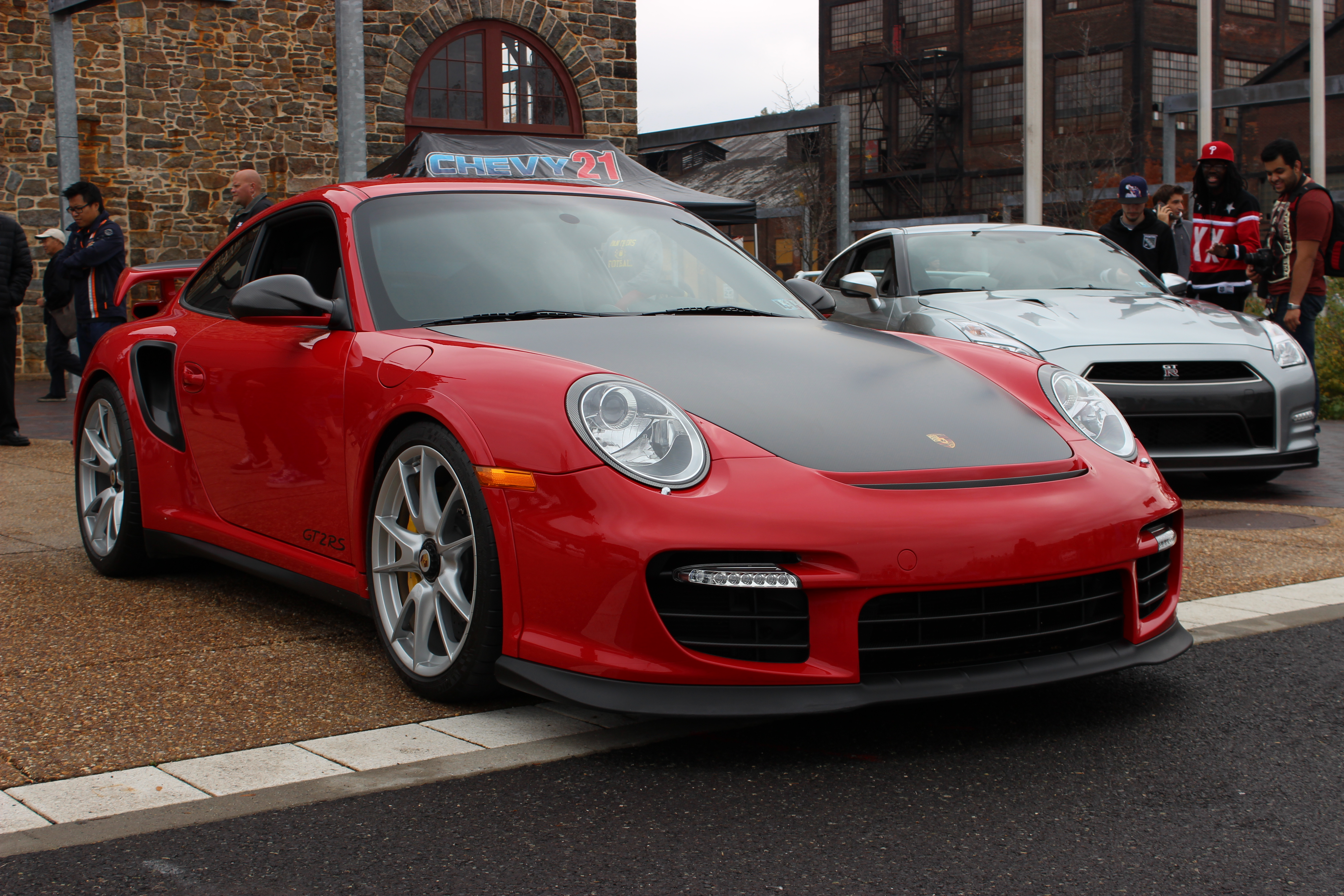

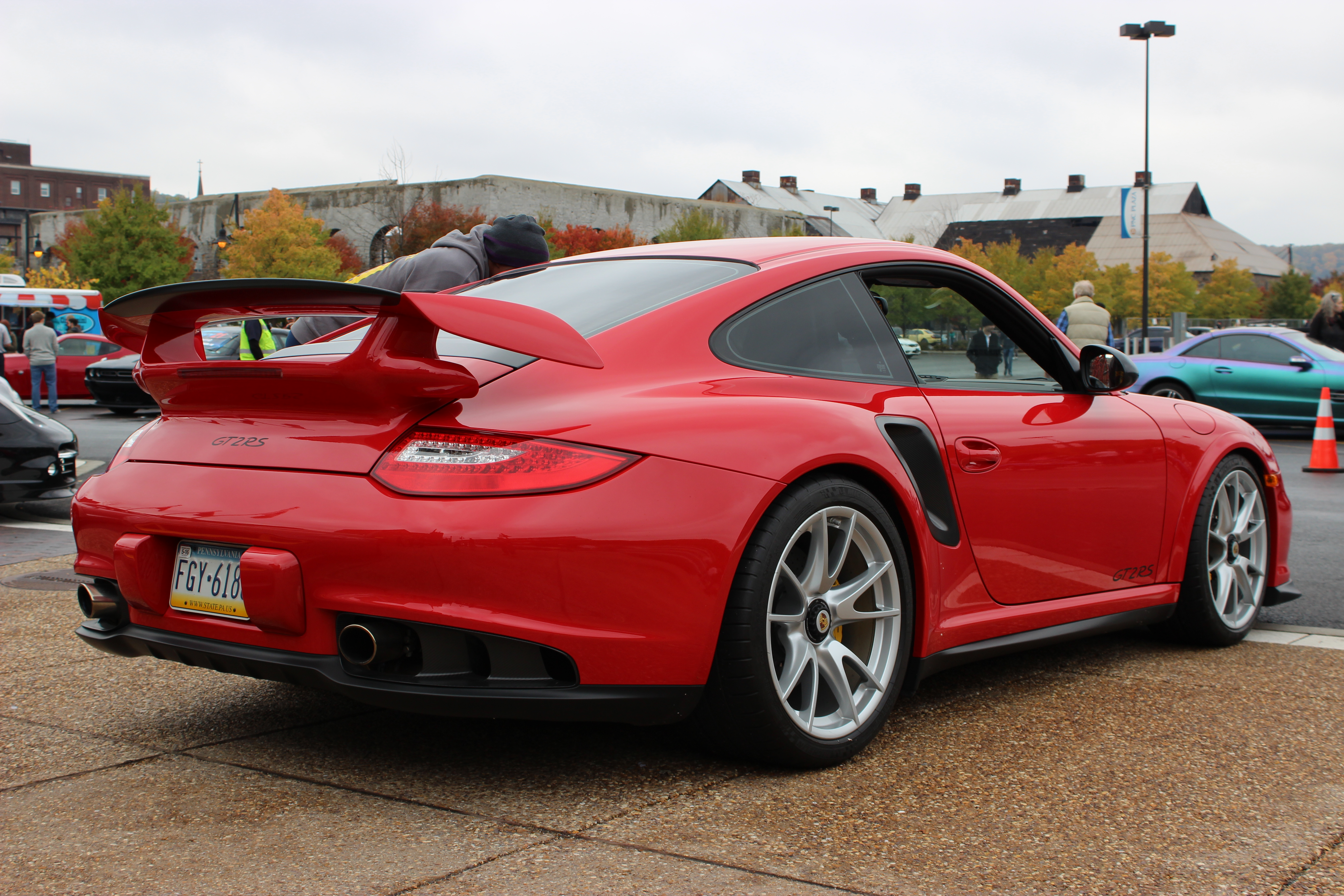
Porsche 997 GT2 RS

On 4 May 2010, the GT2 RS was publicly unveiled to the German Porsche dealers in Leipzig. The 3.6-litre twin-turbocharged Flat-6 engine in the GT2 RS develops 620 PS (612 bhp; 456 kW) and 700 N⋅m (516 lb⋅ft) of torque and weighs 70 kg (154 lb) less than the outgoing GT2. This allows it to be able to reach a top speed of 330 km/h (205 mph) and accelerate from 0–97 km/h (0–60 mph) in 3.3 seconds. It was the fastest and the most powerful 911 built of its generation.

According to Porsche Motorsports manager Andreas Preuninger, the RS was conceived around 2007 as a skunk-works effort. The 727 code number selected for the project corresponds to one of the Nissan GT-R's lap times around the Nürburgring's Nordschleife. When the dust settled, Porsche claimed that test driver Timo Kluck had supposedly eclipsed that target by nine seconds.

The GT2 has since then been an RS model only with no standard (non-RS) variant available.

=== 911 Carrera GTS and Carrera 4 GTS (2010–2011) ===
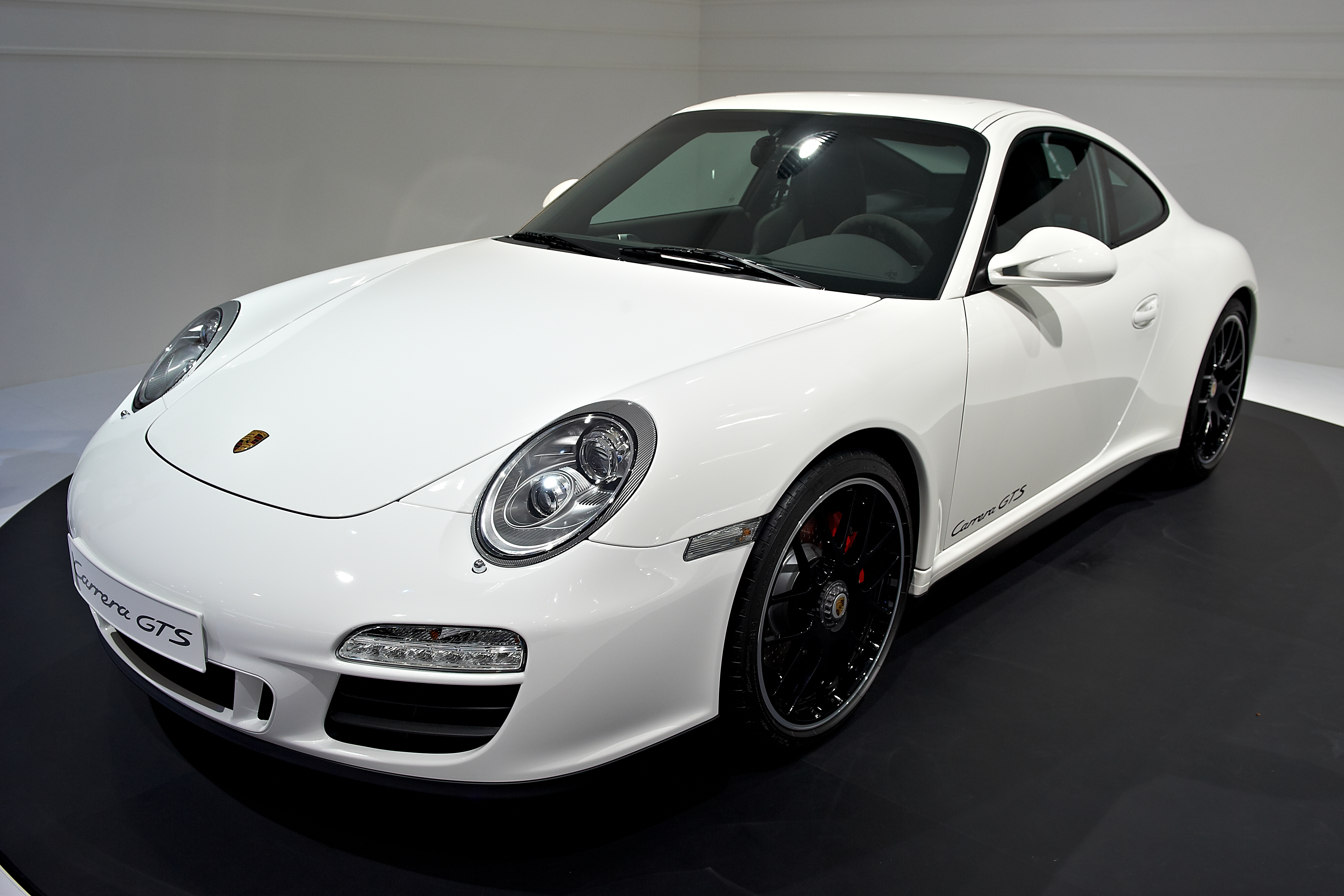
997 Carrera GTS (2010)

In 2011, Porsche launched a new, mid-level 911 coming in above the Carrera S and below the GT3. Ranging from $103,100 to US$112,900, the Carrera GTS was available as both a coupé and cabriolet, the car gets a wider body and track – the only Carrera variant with a wide track that is also rear wheel drive. The car also has an upgraded 3.8-litre engine generating a maximum power output of 408 metric horsepower (300 kW; 402 bhp). The Carrera 4 GTS equipped with all-wheel-drive was unveiled in May 2011. In addition to the AWD system, the Carrera 4 GTS can be identified by a distinct reflective stripe between the tail lights. All GTS vehicles came standard with center lock wheels, Alcantara interior and other optional extras such as Porsche Sports Exhaust and PASM.

In 2011 Porsche unveiled 911 Carrera GTS B59 Edition. It was made as a tribute to Porsche's factory driver - Hurley Haywood. The car was painted in Brumos Racing's color scheme (white with blue and red stripes and black porsche lettering on doors). Also Sport Classic Fuchs rims were used. Limited to just 5 units.

=== 911 Speedster (2011) ===
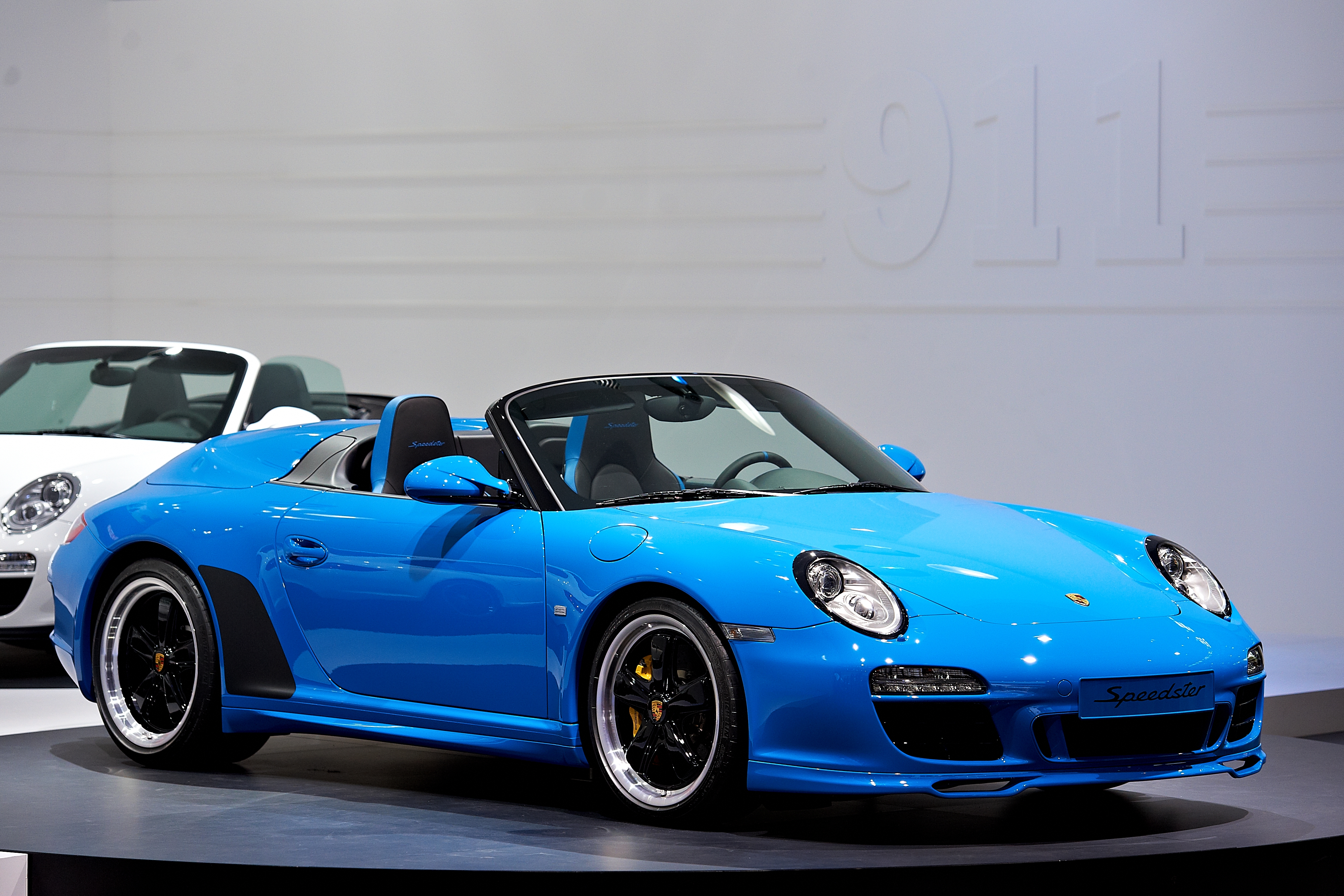

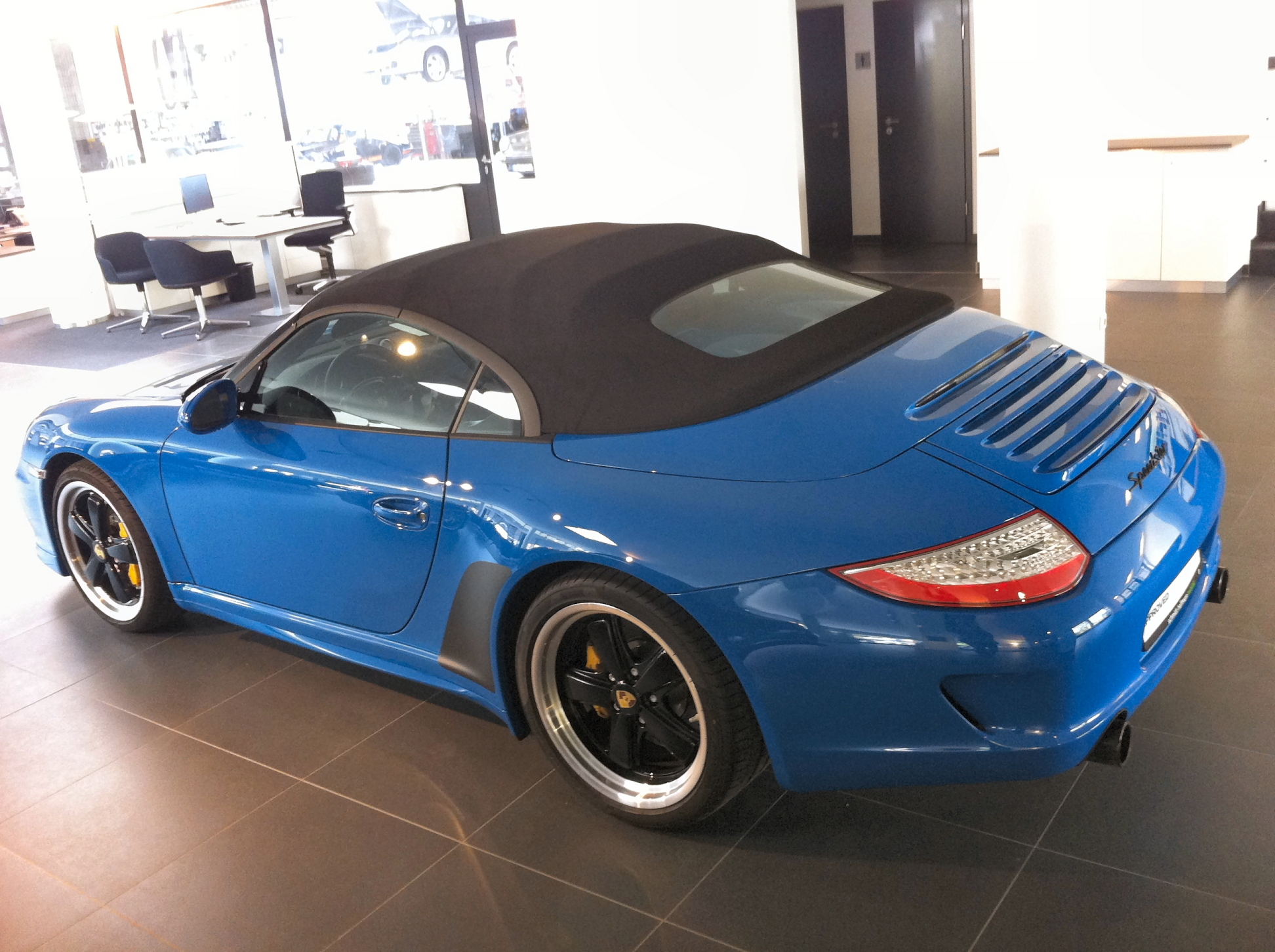
Porsche 997 Speedster (2010)

In 2011, Porsche introduced a new 911 Speedster variant having a production run of 356 units only, the production number coming from the iconic car of the 1950s. It was the third production 911 Speedster made, preceded by the 1989 911 Carrera and 964 versions - the 993 generation didn't have a regular production speedster variant and the 996 generation didn't have a speedster variant at all. The Speedster was powered by the same engine as the Carrera GTS, which generated a maximum power output of 408 PS (300 kW; 402 bhp), and was only offered with PDK as opposed to the '89 Speedster and 964 Speedster. It can accelerate from 0–97 km/h (0–60 mph) in 4.2 seconds to a top speed of around 306 km/h (190 mph). Only two colours were offered, Pure Blue (which was developed specifically for the Speedster) and Carrera White. (Paint To Sample versions were produced in very limited numbers).

The Speedster featured a windscreen 70 mm (2.8 in) shorter than the standard 997 cabriolet while maintaining the same rake angle along with a familiar hump on the rear section to store the soft top.

=== GT3 RS 4.0 (2011) ===
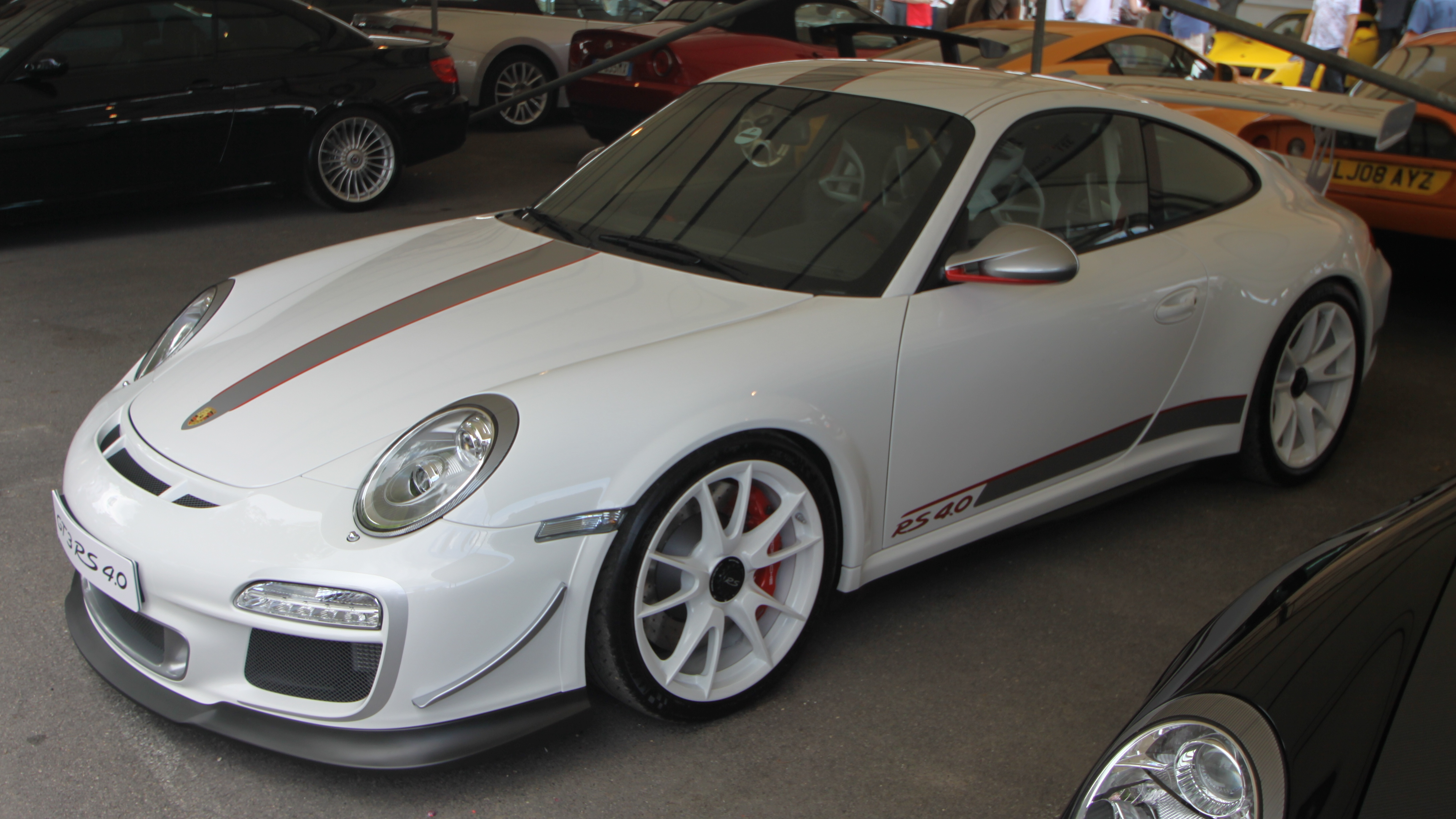
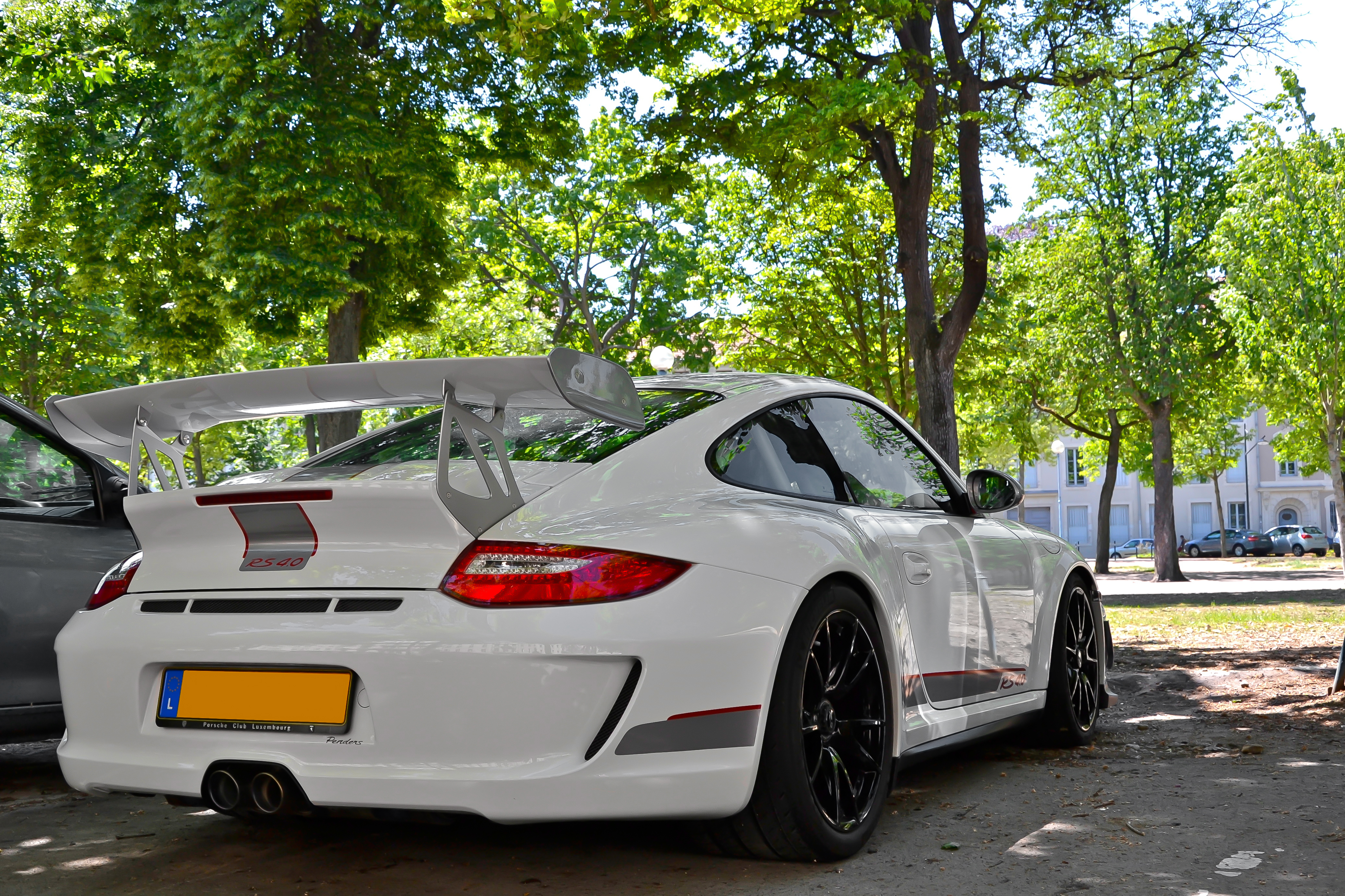

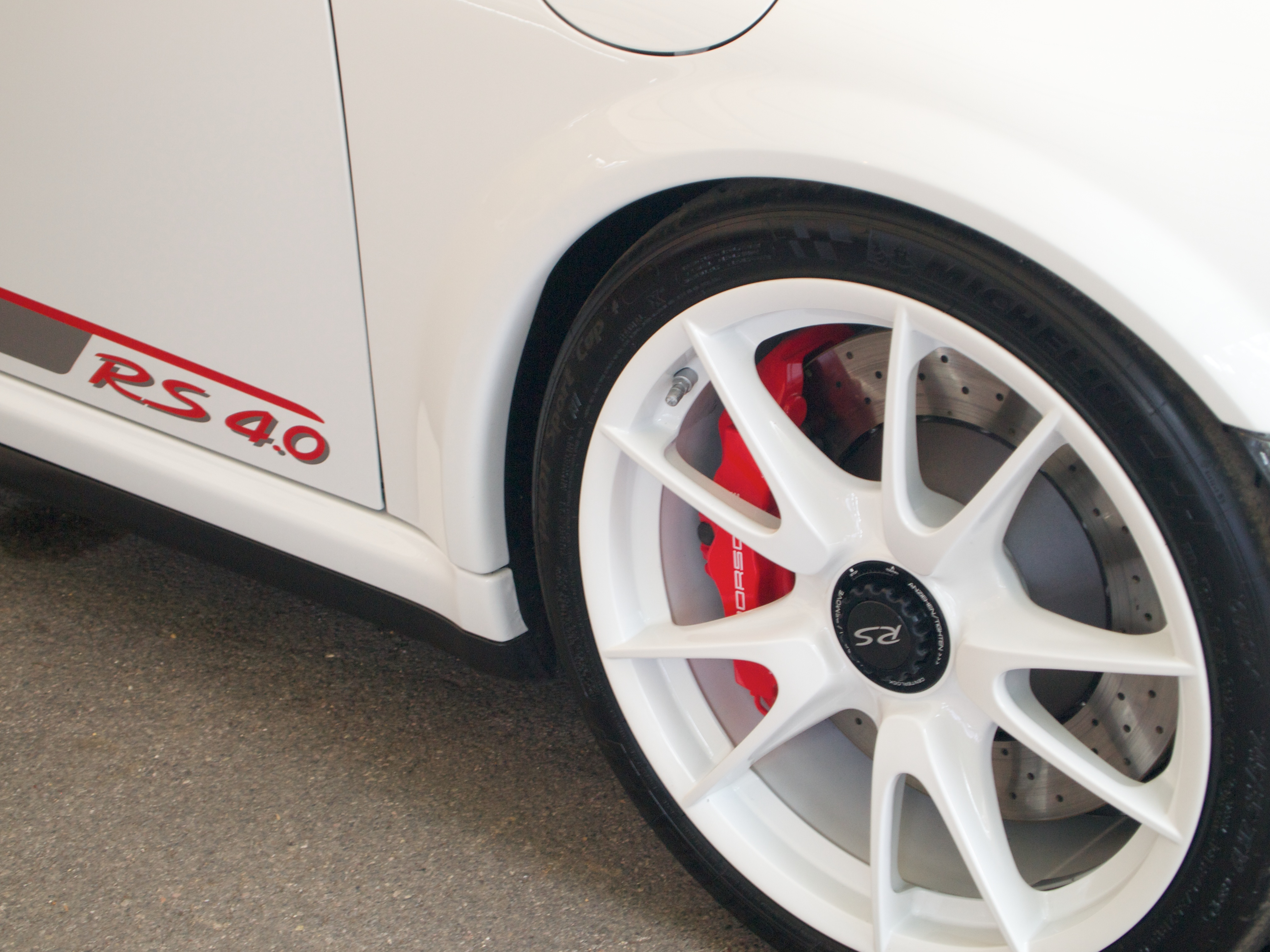
Porsche 997 GT3 RS 4.0

In April 2011 Porsche revealed the final evolution of the 997, the 911 GT3 RS 4.0. It featured a 4.0-litre engine utilizing the crankshaft from the GT3 RSR with increased stroke dimensions (from 76.4 mm to 80.4 mm). This increased the power output to 500 PS (368 kW; 493 bhp) at 8,250 rpm and 460 N⋅m (339 lbf⋅ft) of torque at 5,750 rpm. Chassis development was influenced by the GT2 RS and uses parts sourced from other RS 911 models. Front dive planes provided additional downforce up front. The car weighs in at 1,370 kg (3,020 lb), giving it a power-to-weight ratio of 370 PS per ton. Production was limited to only 600 cars.

=== Transmissions ===
All models include standard 6-speed manual transmission except for the Turbo S models and Speedster. The 7-speed PDK transmission was available in all but GT3, GT3 RS, GT3 Cup, GT3 RS 4.0, GT2, GT2 RS, and Sport Classic models. The PDK transmission features a Sport Plus setting that includes launch control and faster shifts.

=== Performance ===
Model	Acceleration (0–60 mph) (s)		Acceleration (0–100 km/h) (s)			Top speed	
Model	manual	PDK	manual	PDK	PDK Sport+	manual	PDK
Carrera	4.7	4.4	4.9	4.6	4.5	289 km/h (180 mph)	287 km/h (178 mph)
Carrera Cabriolet	4.9	4.7	5.1	4.9	4.7	289 km/h (180 mph)	287 km/h (178 mph)
Carrera 4	4.8	4.6	5.0	4.8	4.6	284 km/h (176 mph)	282 km/h (175 mph)
Carrera 4 Cabriolet	5.0	4.8	5.2	5.0	4.8	284 km/h (176 mph)	282 km/h (175 mph)
Carrera S	4.5	4.3	4.7	4.5	4.3	299 km/h (186 mph)	300 km/h (186 mph)
Carrera S Cabriolet	4.7	4.5	4.9	4.7	4.5	302 km/h (188 mph)	300 km/h (186 mph)
Carrera 4S	4.5	4.3	4.7	4.5	4.3	297 km/h (185 mph)	295 km/h (183 mph)
Carrera 4S Cabriolet	4.7	4.5	4.9	4.7	4.5	297 km/h (185 mph)	295 km/h (183 mph)
Carrera GTS	4.4	4.2	4.6	4.4	4.2	306 km/h (190 mph)	304 km/h (189 mph)
Carrera 4 GTS	4.4	4.2	4.6	4.4	4.2	—	—
Targa 4	5.2	5.0	5.2	5.0	4.8	284 km/h (176 mph)	282 km/h (175 mph)
Targa 4S	4.9	4.7	4.9	4.7	4.5	297 km/h (185 mph)	295 km/h (183 mph)
GT3	4.0	—	4.1	—	—	312 km/h (194 mph)	—
GT3 RS	3.8	—	4.0	—	—	310 km/h (193 mph)	—
GT3 RS 4.0	3.8	—	3.9	—	—	310.6 km/h (193.0 mph)	—
Turbo	2.9	2.9	3.1	3.4	3.2	312 km/h (194 mph)	312 km/h (194 mph)
Turbo Cabriolet	3.1	3.0	3.3	3.7	3.5	312 km/h (194 mph)	312 km/h (194 mph)
Turbo S	2.8	2.7	—	—	3.3	—	315 km/h (196 mph)
Turbo S Cabriolet	3.0	2.9	—	—	3.3	—	315 km/h (196 mph)
Sport Classic	—	—	4.6	—	—	302 km/h (188 mph)	—
Speedster	—	—	—	4.6	4.4	—	305 km/h (190 mph)

=== Physical ===
Model	Weight^{*}	Wheel/tire (front)	Wheel/tire (rear)
Carrera	1,415 kg (3,120 lb)	8×18in, 235/40ZR18	10.5×18in, 265/40ZR18
Carrera 4	1,470 kg (3,241 lb)	8×19in, 235/35ZR19	11×19in, 295/30ZR19
Carrera S	1,425 kg (3,142 lb)	8×19in, 235/35ZR19	11×19in, 295/30ZR19
Carrera 4S	1,480 kg (3,263 lb)	8×19in, 235/35ZR19	11×19in, 305/30ZR19
Carrera Cabriolet	1,500 kg (3,307 lb)	8×18in, 235/40ZR18	10.5×18in, 265/40ZR18
Carrera Cabriolet 4	1,555 kg (3,428 lb)	8×19in, 235/35ZR19	11×19in, 295/30ZR19
Carrera Cabriolet S	1,510 kg (3,329 lb)	8×19in, 235/35ZR19	11×19in, 295/30ZR19
Carrera Cabriolet 4S	1,565 kg (3,450 lb)	8×19in, 235/35ZR19	11×19in, 305/30ZR19
Targa 4	1,530 kg (3,373 lb)	8×18in, 235/40ZR18	11×18in, 295/35ZR18
Targa 4S	1,540 kg (3,395 lb)	8×19in, 235/35ZR19	11×19in, 305/30ZR19
GT3	1,395 kg (3,075 lb)	8.5×19in 235/35ZR19	12×19in 305/30ZR19
GT3 RS	1,370 kg (3,020 lb)	9×19in, 245/35ZR19	12×19in, 325/30ZR19
GT3 Cup	1,200 kg (2,646 lb)	9.5×18in, 24/64-18	12×18in, 27/68-18
Turbo and Turbo S	1,570 kg (3,461 lb)	8.5×19in 235/35ZR19	11×19in, 305/30ZR19

^{*}PDK +30 kg (66 lb), Cabriolet +85 kg (187 lb), Lithium-ion battery −10 kg (−22 lb)

== Marketing ==
In June 2009, Porsche Cars North America partnered with five New York City street artists to unveil five graffiti-decorated Porsche 911 hoods in the Helenbeck Gallery. The hoods were sold to raise funds for CITYarts, a New York City-based organization whose mission is to bring children in contact with public artists.

== Mechanical issues ==
Porsche 997.1 and 997.2 models can suffer from cylinder bore scoring which occurs when there is a breakdown of the Al-Si Cylinder system. This results in wide areas of the cylinder walls having deep scratches or gouges with similar damage to the pistons. Engines with cylinder bore scoring will have poor piston ring seal and increased piston noise coupled with increased oil consumption. 997.1 models with the Lokasil engine block are more susceptible to this issue, however 997.2 models can also suffer from cylinder bore scoring, albeit at a much lower rate than its predecessor.

Although the 996 had issues with the intermediate shaft bearing and rear main seal, the 997.1 addressed these problem areas. IMS and RMS failures with the 997 are uncommon. Porsche used a larger, non-serviceable IMS bearing and these engines also received an updated PTFE rear main seal.
