= 2015 Trans-Am Series =

American sports car racing competition

Seasons
- ← 2014 2016 →

The 2015 Trans-Am Series was the 47th running of the Sports Car Club of America's Trans Am Series. Amy Ruman won an impressive 8 races, and made history for the second time by becoming the first woman ever to win a Trans Am Series Championship, in addition to her unprecedented first win in 2011.

Amy Ruman -- The first ever female Trans Am Series Champion

== Schedule ==
The schedule was released December 5, 2014, and consists of twelve rounds.

=== Calendar and results ===
Round	Circuit	Date	TA Winning driver	TA Winning vehicle	TA2 Winning driver	TA2 Winning vehicle	TA3-I Winning driver	TA3-I Winning vehicle	TA3-A Winning driver	TA3-A Winning vehicle
1	Sebring International Raceway	March 1	(United States) Amy Ruman	Chevrolet Corvette	(United States) Cameron Lawrence	Dodge Challenger	(United States) Lee Saunders	Dodge Viper	(United States) Todd Napieralski	Chevrolet Camaro
2	Homestead-Miami Speedway	April 13	(United States) Amy Ruman	Chevrolet Corvette	(United States) Cameron Lawrence	Dodge Challenger	(United States) Steve Streimer	Dodge Viper	(United States) Thomas Ellis	Ford Mustang
3	Road Atlanta	May 7	(United States) Amy Ruman	Chevrolet Corvette	(United States) Cameron Lawrence	Dodge Challenger	(United States) Lee Saunders	Dodge Viper	(United States) Ernie Francis Jr.	Chevrolet Camaro
4	Lime Rock Park	May 23	(United States) Paul Fix	Chevrolet Corvette	(United States) Tony Ave	Ford Mustang	(United States) Randy Mueller	BMW M3	(United States) Ernie Francis Jr.	Chevrolet Camaro
5	New Jersey Motorsports Park	June 13	(United States) Amy Ruman	Chevrolet Corvette	(United States) Adam Andretti	Ford Mustang	(United States) Andrew Aquilante	Chevrolet Corvette	(United States) Ernie Francis Jr.	Chevrolet Camaro
6	Brainerd International Raceway	July 5	(United States) Amy Ruman	Chevrolet Corvette	(United States) Dillon Machavern	Ford Mustang	(United States) Cindi Lux	Dodge Viper	(United States) Jason Fichter	Chevrolet Camaro
7	Mid-Ohio Sports Car Course	August 15	(United States) Paul Fix	Chevrolet Corvette	(United States) Gar Robinson	Chevrolet Camaro	(United States) Michael Camus	BMW M3	(United States) Ernie Francis Jr.	Chevrolet Camaro
8	Road America	August 29	(United States) Jim McAleese	Chevrolet Corvette	(United States) Tony Ave	Ford Mustang	(United States) Steve Streimer	Dodge Viper	(United States) Ernie Francis Jr.	Chevrolet Camaro
9	Virginia International Raceway	September 27	(United States) Paul Fix	Chevrolet Corvette	(United States) Cameron Lawrence	Dodge Challenger	(United States) Randy Mueller	BMW M3	(United States) Ernie Francis Jr.	Chevrolet Camaro
10	NOLA Motorsports Park	October 11	(United States) Amy Ruman	Chevrolet Corvette	(United States) Gar Robinson	Chevrolet Camaro	(United States) Steve Streimer	Dodge Viper	(United States) Ernie Francis Jr.	Chevrolet Camaro
11	Circuit of the Americas	November 8	(United States) Amy Ruman	Chevrolet Corvette	(United States) Adam Andretti	Chevrolet Camaro	(Panama) Fernando Seferlis	Aston Martin GT4	(United States) Ernie Francis Jr.	Chevrolet Camaro
12	Daytona International Speedway	November 14	(United States) Amy Ruman	Chevrolet Corvette	(United States) Gar Robinson	Chevrolet Camaro	(Austria) Martin Ragginger	Porsche 997	(United States) Dean Martin	Ford Mustang

== Driver standings ==
=== TA ===
Pos	Driver	Car	Starts	Points
1	(United States) Amy Ruman	Chevrolet Corvette	12	345
2	(United States) Paul Fix	Chevrolet Corvette	12	311
3	(United States) John Baucom	Ford Mustang	12	266
4	(United States) Doug Peterson	Chevrolet Corvette/Cadillac CTS-V	12	250
5	(United States) Simon Gregg	Chevrolet Corvette	12	255
6	(United States) Kerry Hitt	Chevrolet Corvette	12	221
7	(United States) Jim McAleese	Chevrolet Corvette	11	213
8	(United States) Cliff Ebben	Ford Mustang	9	205
9	(United States) David Pintaric	Chevrolet Corvette	10	182
10	(United States) Mickey Wright	Chevrolet Corvette	9	137
11	(Argentina) Claudio Burtin	Chevrolet Corvette	8	124
12	(United States) Joseph Freda	Chevrolet Corvette	6	85
13	(United States) Richard Grant	Chevrolet Corvette	4	78
14	(United States) Kenny Bupp	Chevrolet Camaro	3	47
15	(Canada) Andrew Romocki	Ford Mustang	3	47
16	(Canada) Allan Lewis	Chevrolet Corvette	3	45
17	(Dominican Republic) R. J. López	Chevrolet Corvette	3	45
18	(United States) Denny Lamers	Ford Mustang	3	44
19	(United States) Tom Ellis	Ford Mustang	3	44
20	(United States) Adam Andretti	Chevrolet Corvette	2	41
21	(United States) David Fershtand	Chevrolet Corvette	2	48
22	(Panama) Mario Barcenas	Chevrolet Corvette	3	36
23	(United States) Greg Pickett	Jaguar XKR	2	34
24	(United States) Keith Grant	Chevrolet Corvette	2	30
25	(United States) Michael Lewis	Jaguar XKR	1	27
26	(United States) Dave Ruehlow	Chevrolet Corvette	1	23
27	(United States) Tony Ave	Cadillac CTS-V	1	20
28	(Panama) Oscar Teran	Jaguar XKR	2	20
29	(United States) Dane Smith	Chevrolet Corvette	1	19
30	(United States) Charles Wicht	Chevrolet Corvette	2	19
31	(Panama) Rafael Barcenas	Chevrolet Corvette	1	16
32	(United States) Daniel Urrutia	Chevrolet Corvette	1	15
33	(United States) Henry Gilbert	Chevrolet Corvette	1	10
34	(United States) A. J. Henriksen	Chevrolet Corvette	1	7
35	(United States) Tom Smith	Chevrolet Camaro	1	0
36	(United States) Tomy Drissi	Chevrolet Corvette	1	0
37	(United States) Tim Rubright	Ford Mustang	0	0

=== TA2 ===
Pos	Driver	Car	Starts	Points
1	(United States) Gar Robinson	Chevrolet Camaro	12	298
2	(United States) Adam Andretti	Chevrolet Camaro/Ford Mustang	12	290
3	(United States) Cameron Lawrence	Dodge Challenger	12	288
4	(United States) Shane Lewis	Chevrolet Camaro	12	231
5	(United States) Dillon Machavern	Ford Mustang	12	218
6	(United States) Joe Stevens	Dodge Challenger	12	190
7	(United States) Tony Buffomante	Ford Mustang	11	184
8	(United States) Lawrence Loshak	Ford Mustang	12	172
9	(United States) Tom Sheehan	Chevrolet Camaro	12	170
10	(Canada) Kevin Poitras	Ford Mustang	10	161
11	(United States) Justin Napoleon	Chevrolet Camaro	12	141
12	(United States) Tony Ave	Ford Mustang	11	137
13	(United States) Tommy Archer	Chevrolet Camaro	8	134
14	(United States) Keith Prociuk	Chevrolet Camaro	12	114
15	(United States) J. J. Haley	Chevrolet Camaro	6	111
16	(United States) Joe Napoleon	Chevrolet Camaro	12	111
17	(United States) Ron Keith	Ford Mustang	8	86
18	(United States) Jordan Bernloehr	Chevrolet Camaro	5	79
19	(United States) Jason Kennedy	Chevrolet Camaro	8	71
20	(United States) Joe Ebben	Ford Mustang	9	65
21	(Canada) Michael McGahern	Chevrolet Camaro	6	64
22	(United States) Steve Kent Jr.	Chevrolet Camaro/Ford Mustang	5	58
23	(United States) Tom West	Chevrolet Camaro	5	56
24	(United States) Jordan Bupp	Ford Mustang	3	48
25	(United States) Bruce Nesbitt	Ford Mustang	6	45
26	(United States) George Lutich	Ford Mustang	3	38
27	(Canada) Kyle Marcelli	Chevrolet Camaro	3	31
28	(United States) Kevin O'Connell	Ford Mustang	2	31
29	(United States) Steven Lustig	Chevrolet Camaro	3	29
30	(United States) Kurt Roehrig	Chevrolet Camaro	3	28
31	(United States) Allen Milarcik	Chevrolet Camaro	5	27
32	(United States) Hal Musler	Chevrolet Camaro	3	24
33	(United States) Scott Heckert	Ford Mustang	1	23
34	(United States) Bobby Kennedy	Ford Mustang	3	23
35	(United States) John Atwell	Chevrolet Camaro	7	23
36	(United States) Tim Gray	Chevrolet Camaro	7	23
37	(United States) Aaron Quine	Chevrolet Camaro	3	22
38	(United States) Vaughn Gittin Jr.	Ford Mustang	1	21
39	(United States) Dick Danielson	Chevrolet Camaro	1	20
40	(United States) A. J. Henriksen	Chevrolet Camaro	1	19
41	(United States) Scott Ferguson	Chevrolet Camaro	2	19
42	(United States) Bob Stretch	Chevrolet Camaro	2	18
43	(United States) Samuel LeComte	Chevrolet Camaro	2	18
44	(United States) Jeff Van Lierop	Chevrolet Camaro	3	18
45	(United States) Nate Stokey	Chevrolet Camaro	4	17
46	(United States) Johan Schwartz	Chevrolet Camaro	1	18
47	(United States) Brian Kubinski	Chevrolet Camaro	1	16
48	(United States) Matt Parent	Ford Mustang	2	16
49	(United States) Joseph Staurovsky	Chevrolet Camaro	3	16
50	(United States) Tony Cook	Chevrolet Camaro	3	15
51	(United States) Jason Hart	Dodge Challenger	1	14
52	(United States) Nick Hazelwood	Chevrolet Camaro	4	13
53	(United States) Ted Sullivan	Ford Mustang	1	6
54	(United States) David Jans	Ford Mustang	1	6
55	(Canada) Joey McColm	Ford Mustang	2	6
56	(United States) Wally Dallenbach Jr.	Chevrolet Camaro	1	6
57	(United States) Ricky Sanders	Chevrolet Camaro	3	5
58	(United States) Brian LaCroix	Chevrolet Camaro	1	2
59	(United States) Travis Cope	Ford Mustang	1	1
60	(United States) Jody O'Donnell	Chevrolet Camaro	1	1
61	(United States) Frank Lussier	Chevrolet Camaro	1	1
62	(United States) Brad Roudebush	Chevrolet Camaro	1	1
63	(Canada) Harry Steenbakkers	Chevrolet Camaro	1	1
64	(Antigua and Barbuda) Carlo Falcone	Ford Mustang	0	0
65	(United States) Dan Knox	Chevrolet Camaro	0	0

=== TA3-I ===
Pos	Driver	Car	Starts	Points
1	(United States) Lee Saunders	Dodge Viper	10	265
2	(United States) Michael Camus	BMW M3	7	166
3	(United States) Steve Streimer	Dodge Viper	5	155
4	(United States) Jerry Greene	Porsche 996	6	141
5	(United States) Jason Berkeley	Chevrolet Corvette	6	137
6	(United States) Russ Snow	Chevrolet Corvette	7	135
7	(United States) Milton Grant	Porsche 997	6	115
8	(United States) Randy Mueller	BMW M3	8	110
9	(United States) Clint Sawinsky	Porsche 996	5	103
10	(United States) John Gutleber	Chevrolet Corvette	4	102
11	(United States) Cindi Lux	Dodge Viper	3	81
12	(Panama) Fernando Seferlis	Aston Martin GT4	2	60
13	(United States) Hugh Boocher	Chevrolet Corvette	3	59
14	(United States) Larry Funk	BMW M3	2	44
15	(Austria) Martin Ragginger	Porsche 997	1	32
16	(United States) Andrew Aquilante	Chevrolet Corvette	1	32
17	(United States) Vincent Allegretta	BMW M3	2	30
18	(United States) Frank Lussier	Dodge Viper	1	27
19	(United States) David Mazyck	Dodge Viper	1	27
20	(United States) Carey Grant	Porsche 997	1	27
21	(United States) Randy Kinsland	Chevrolet Corvette	1	22
22	(United States) David Sanders	Chevrolet Corvette	1	21

=== TA3-A ===
Pos	Driver	Car	Starts	Points
1	(United States) Ernie Francis Jr.	Chevrolet Camaro	12	369
2	(United States) Todd Napieralski	Chevrolet Camaro	12	300
3	(United States) Mel Shaw	Ford Mustang	12	239
4	(Panama) Fernando Seferlis	Chevrolet Camaro	8	174
5	(United States) Jason Fichter	Chevrolet Camaro	6	125
6	(United States) Dave Ricci	Chevrolet Camaro	6	123
7	(United States) Chris DeSalvo	Ford Mustang	5	122
8	(United States) Tim Rubright	Ford Mustang	6	122
9	(United States) Robert Korzen	Ford Mustang	3	73
10	(United States) Thomas Ellis	Ford Mustang	3	69
11	(United States) Rich Jones	Ford Mustang	3	65
12	(United States) Mike Geldart	Ford Mustang	3	59
13	(United States) Craig Capaldi	Ford Mustang	2	52
14	(United States) Spencer Caudle	Dodge Challenger	2	42
15	(United States) Bill Batten	Chevrolet Camaro	2	41
16	(United States) Adam Kreysar	Ford Mustang	2	34
17	(United States) Dean Martin	Ford Mustang	1	32
18	(United States) Preston Calvert	Ford Mustang	1	24
19	(United States) Chuck Cassaro	Ford Mustang	1	23
20	(United States) Mark Luna	Ford Mustang	1	21
21	(United States) Cameron Maugeri	Ford Mustang	1	21
22	(United States) Steve Coleman	Ford Mustang	1	19
23	(United States) Chris Outzen	Ford Mustang	1	18
24	(United States) Brian Kleeman	Ford Mustang	1	15
25	(United States) Rich Rigda	Chevrolet Camaro	1	14
20	(United States) Joe Rosenheck	Ford Mustang	0	0
