= 2017 Trans-Am Series =

American motor racing competition

The 2017 Trans-Am Series was the 49th running of the Sports Car Club of America's Trans-Am Series, and consisted of 13 races. The Detroit race was for TA and TA2 only, and the Circuit of the Americas race was a shared race.

The rules set from the end of the 2016 season featured four classes: TA, TA2, TA3, and TA4 was retained for 2017.

A separate "West Coast" championship with 3 races separate from the main championship and one round shared with the main championship, the race at Circuit of the Americas was contested for the first time ever.

== Schedule changes ==
The New Jersey Motorsports Park and Watkins Glen races moved from the spring to the fall while Homestead-Miami Speedway moved from the fall to the Spring. NOLA Motorsports Park was dropped from the schedule, while the series ran at the Indianapolis Motor Speedway road course for the first time, sharing a weekend with the Sportscar Vintage Racing Association.

== Television ==
The following events were televised on CBS Sports Network on a tape-delay basis:

- Detroit
- Indianapolis
- Brainerd
- Mid Ohio
- Road America
- Circuit of the Americas

== Calendar and results ==
=== Main Championship ===
Round	Circuit	Date	TA Winning driver	TA Winning vehicle	TA2 Winning driver	TA2 Winning vehicle	TA3 Winning driver	TA3 Winning vehicle	TA4 Winning driver	TA4 Winning vehicle
1	Sebring International Raceway	March 5	(United States) Cliff Ebben	Ford Mustang	(United States) Dillon Machavern	Ford Mustang	(United States) Mark Boden	Porsche 911 GT3 Cup	(United States) Brian Kleeman	Ford Mustang
2	Homestead-Miami Speedway	April 9	(United States) Ernie Francis Jr.	Ford Mustang	(United States) Gar Robinson	Chevrolet Camaro	(United States) Randy Kinsland	Chevrolet Corvette	(United States) Brian Kleeman	Ford Mustang
3	Road Atlanta	May 13	(United States) Ernie Francis Jr.	Ford Mustang	(United States) Tony Buffomante	Ford Mustang	(United States) Randy Kinsland	Chevrolet Corvette	(United States) Brian Kleeman	Ford Mustang
4	Motor City 100	June 3	(United States) Ernie Francis Jr.	Ford Mustang	Not held					
4	Motor City 100	June 4	Not held		(United States) Gar Robinson	Chevrolet Camaro	Not held			
5	Indianapolis Motor Speedway	June 18	(United States) Ernie Francis Jr.	Ford Mustang	(United States) Gar Robinson	Chevrolet Camaro	(United States) Mark Boden	Porsche 911 GT3 Cup	(United States) Andrew Entwistle	Ford Mustang
6	Brainerd International Raceway	July 2	(United States) Cameron Lawrence	Chevrolet Corvette	(United States) Tony Buffomante	Ford Mustang	(United States) Tim Kezman	Porsche 911 GT3 Cup	(United States) JR Pesek	Ford Mustang
7	Mid-Ohio Sports Car Course	August 12	(United States) Ernie Francis Jr.	Ford Mustang	(United States) Tony Buffomante	Ford Mustang	(United States) Mark Boden	Porsche 911 GT3 Cup	(United States) Brian Kleeman	Ford Mustang
8	Road America	August 26	(United States) Ernie Francis Jr.	Ford Mustang	(United States) Sheldon Creed	Dodge Challenger	(United States) Jason Daskalos	Dodge Viper Competition Coupe	(United States) Brian Kleeman	Ford Mustang
9	Watkins Glen International	September 10	(United States) Andy Lally	Chevrolet Camaro	(United States) Tony Buffomante	Ford Mustang	(United States) Tim Kezman	Porsche 911 GT3 Cup	(United States) Brian Kleeman	Ford Mustang
10	Virginia International Raceway	September 24	(United States) Ernie Francis Jr.	Ford Mustang	(United States) Gar Robinson	Chevrolet Camaro	(United States) Cindi Lux	Dodge Viper ACR–X	(United States) Steven Davison	Aston Martin Vantage GT4
11	New Jersey Motorsports Park	October 8	(United States) Ernie Francis Jr.	Ford Mustang	(United States) Gar Robinson	Chevrolet Camaro	(United States) Neal Walker	Porsche 991.2	(United States) Brian Kleeman	Ford Mustang
12	Circuit of the Americas	November 4	(United States) Ernie Francis Jr.	Ford Mustang	(United States) Shane Lewis	Chevrolet Camaro	(United States) Jason Daskalos	Dodge Viper Competition Coupe	(United States) Shane Lewis	Chevrolet Camaro
13	Daytona International Speedway	November 11	(United States) Ernie Francis Jr.	Ford Mustang	(United States) Tony Buffomante	Ford Mustang	(United States) Tim Kezman	Porsche 911 GT3 Cup	(United States) Todd Napieralski	Chevrolet Camaro

=== West Coast Championship ===
Round	Circuit	Date	TA Winning driver	TA Winning vehicle	TA2 Winning driver	TA2 Winning vehicle	TA3 Winning driver	TA3 Winning vehicle	TA4 Winning driver	TA4 Winning vehicle
1	Willow Springs International Motorsports Park	March 26	(United States) Tomy Drissi	Chevrolet Corvette	(United States) Brad McAllister	Ford Mustang	(United States) Tyler McQuarrie	Lamborghini Gallardo	No entries	
2	Auto Club Speedway	April 30	(United States) Tomy Drissi	Chevrolet Corvette	(United States) Justin Napoleon	Chevrolet Camaro	(United States) William Brinkop	Chevrolet Corvette	(United States) Guy Dreier	Maserati GranTurismo MC GT4
3	Portland International Raceway	July 30	(United States) Greg Pickett	Ford Mustang	(United States) Shane Lewis	Chevrolet Camaro	(United States) Steve Streimer	Dodge Viper ACR–X	(United States) Tim Brown	Ford Mustang GT4
4	Circuit of the Americas	November 4	(United States) Tomy Drissi	Chevrolet Corvette	(United States) Shane Lewis	Chevrolet Camaro	No entries		(United States) Guy Dreier	Maserati GranTurismo MC GT4

== Driver standings (Main championship) ==
=== TA ===
Pos	Driver	Car	Starts	Points
1	(United States) Ernie Francis Jr.	Ford Mustang	13	386
2	(United States) Vincent Allegretta	Chevrolet Corvette	13	288
3	(United States) Amy Ruman	Chevrolet Corvette	13	253
4	(United States) Simon Gregg	Chevrolet Corvette	13	253
5	(United States) Kerry Hitt	Cadillac CTS-V	13	216
6	(United States) Tomy Drissi	Chevrolet Corvette/Ford Mustang	9	169
7	(United States) Jeff Hinkle	Dodge Challenger	8	117
8	(United States) Cliff Ebben	Ford Mustang	5	110
9	(United States) David Pintaric	Cadillac CTS-V	6	105
10	(United States) Richard Grant	Chevrolet Corvette	7	104
11	(United States) John Baucom	Ford Mustang	5	95
12	(United States) Tim Rubright	Ford Mustang	5	84
13	(United States) Mary Wright	Chevrolet Corvette	5	78
14	(United States) Jim McAleese	Chevrolet Corvette/Chevrolet Camaro	4	75
15	(United States) Paul Fix	Chevrolet Corvette/Ford Mustang	3	73
16	(Dominican Republic) R. J. López	Chevrolet Corvette	2	62
17	(United States) Lawrence Lepurage	Chevrolet Corvette	4	60
18	(United States) Henry Gilbert	Chevrolet Corvette	3	54
19	(United States) Daniel Urrutia Jr.	Chevrolet Corvette	3	51
20	(United States) Steve Burns	Ford Mustang	3	49
21	(Argentina) Claudio Burtin	Chevrolet Corvette	5	47
22	(Austria) Martin Ragginger	Chevrolet Camaro	2	46
23	(United States) Cameron Lawrence	Chevrolet Corvette	2	45
24	(United States) Justin Marks	Ford Mustang	2	38
25	(United States) Joseph Freda	Chevrolet Corvette	2	38
26	(United States) Stanton Barrett	Ford Mustang/Chevrolet Corvette	2	37
27	(Canada) Blaise Csida	Chevrolet Corvette	2	37
28	(United States) Andy Lally	Chevrolet Camaro	1	34
29	(United States) Lawrence Loshak	Chevrolet Camaro	1	31
30	(United States) Steve Kent Jr.	Chevrolet Corvette	2	30
31	(United States) Shane Lewis	Chevrolet Corvette	1	26
32	(United States) Jed Copham	Chevrolet Corvette	1	23
33	(United States) Tony Ave	Chevrolet Corvette	1	18
34	(United States) Denny Lamers	Ford Mustang	1	17
35	(United States) David Ruehlow	Chevrolet Corvette	1	16
36	(United States) Chris Dyson	Cadillac CTS-V	1	14
37	(United States) Keith Grant	Chevrolet Corvette	1	6
38	(United States) AJ Henriksen	Chevrolet Corvette	1	0

=== TA2 ===
Pos	Driver	Car	Starts	Points
1	(United States) Gar Robinson	Chevrolet Camaro	13	341
2	(United States) Tony Buffomante	Ford Mustang	13	304
3	(United States) Shane Lewis	Chevrolet Camaro	13	299
4	(United States) Cameron Lawrence	Chevrolet Camaro	11	210
5	(United States) Tom Sheehan	Chevrolet Camaro	13	193
6	(United States) Keith Prociuk	Chevrolet Camaro	13	190
7	(United States) Dillon Machavern	Ford Mustang	8	151
8	(United States) Lawrence Loshak	Chevrolet Camaro	8	146
9	(United States) Matt Parent	Ford Mustang	10	140
10	(United States) Elias Anderson	Ford Mustang	8	112
11	(United States) Ray Neveau	Chevrolet Camaro	11	111
12	(United States) Doug Peterson	Chevrolet Camaro	8	105
13	(Brazil) Raphael Matos	Chevrolet Camaro	5	95
14	(United States) Scott Lagasse Jr.	Chevrolet Camaro	6	92
15	(United States) Sheldon Creed	Dodge Challenger	4	92
16	(United States) Curt Vogt	Ford Mustang	6	88
17	(United States) Tim Gray	Ford Mustang	7	83
18	(Canada) Louis-Phillippe Montour	Chevrolet Camaro	5	75
19	(United States) Adam Andretti	Chevrolet Camaro/Dodge Challenger	8	66
20	(United States) Jordan Bernloehr	Dodge Challenger	4	66
21	(United States) Phil Lasco	Chevrolet Camaro	5	62
22	(United States) Joe Atwell	Chevrolet Camaro	5	61
23	(Antigua and Barbuda) Carlo Falcone	Ford Mustang	4	55
24	(United States) Mitch Marvosh	Ford Mustang	7	55
25	(Canada) Harry Steenbakkers	Chevrolet Camaro	3	52
26	(Canada) Kyle Marcelli	Chevrolet Camaro	3	50
27	(Canada) Roberto Sabato	Ford Mustang	4	50
28	(United States) Bob Lima	Chevrolet Camaro	3	45
29	(United States) Bruce Nesbitt	Ford Mustang	3	44
30	(Canada) Peter Klutt	Dodge Challenger	3	41
31	(United States) Justin Haley	Ford Mustang	2	38
32	(United States) Phillip Di Pippo	Chevrolet Camaro	3	36
33	(United States) Moses Smith	Chevrolet Camaro	2	34
34	(United States) Jason Hart	Dodge Challenger	2	33
35	(United States) Maurice Hull	Ford Mustang	2	28
36	(United States) Josh Bilicki	Chevrolet Camaro	1	37
37	(United States) Sam LeComte	Chevrolet Camaro	3	23
38	(United States) Joe Stevens	Dodge Challenger	1	21
39	(United States) Chris Pedersen	Chevrolet Camaro	3	21
40	(United States) Shannon Ivey	Dodge Challenger	1	18
41	(United States) Bobby Kennedy	Ford Mustang	1	18
42	(United States) Jaques Lazier	Chevrolet Camaro	2	18
42	(United States) Aaron Quine	Chevrolet Camaro	1	17
43	(United States) Ron Keith	Chevrolet Camaro	1	16
45	(United States) Steve Kent Jr.	Chevrolet Camaro	1	15
46	(Canada) Kevin Poitras	Ford Mustang	1	11
47	(United States) Steve Burns	Chevrolet Camaro	1	9
48	(United States) Alex Mayer	Chevrolet Camaro	1	7
49	(United States) Carl Wingo	Ford Mustang	1	7
50	(United States) Tyler Thielmann	Ford Mustang	1	7
51	(United States) Tom West	Chevrolet Camaro	1	5
52	(United States) AJ Henriksen	Chevrolet Camaro	1	4
53	(United States) Andy Lee	Dodge Challenger	1	3
–	(United States) Steven Goldman	Ford Mustang	0	–
–	(United States) Tony Ave	Chevrolet Camaro	0	–
–	(United States) Matt Tifft	Chevrolet Camaro	0	–

=== TA3 ===
Pos	Driver	Car	Starts	Points
1	(United States) Mark Boden	Porsche 911 GT3 Cup	11	283
2	(United States) Tim Kezman	Porsche 911 GT3 Cup	11	273
3	(United States) Tom Herb	Porsche 911 GT3 Cup	10	211
4	(United States) Conor Flynn	Porsche 997	7	163
5	(United States) Kyle Kinsland	Chevrolet Corvette	7	140
6	(United States) Cindi Lux	Dodge Viper	5	129
7	(United States) Dirk Leuenberger	Dodge Viper	5	106
8	(United States) Milton Grant	Porsche 997	5	101
9	(United States) Jason Daskalos	Dodge Viper	2	68
10	(United States) Lee Saunders	Dodge Viper	2	57
11	(United States) Craig Conway	Porsche 997	3	55
12	(United States) Jason Berkeley	Chevrolet Corvette	3	53
13	(United States) Ramin Abdolvahabi	Porsche 997	3	43
14	(United States) Don McMillon	Chevrolet Corvette	2	38
15	(United States) Dave Ricci	Chevrolet Camaro	2	36
16	(United States) Neal Walker	Porsche 991	1	32
17	(United States) Presten Calvert	Porsche 911 GT3/Chevrolet Corvette	2	31
18	(Serbia) Marko Radisic	Ferrari 458 Challenge	2	27
19	(United States) John Buttermore	Chevrolet Corvette	1	21
20	(United States) Larry Bailey	Chevrolet Corvette	1	20
21	(United States) Andrew Aquilante	Chevrolet Corvette	1	20
22	(United States) Steven Davison	Aston Martin Vantage GT4	1	18
23	(United States) Aaron Pierce	Chevrolet Corvette	2	17
24	(Panama) Fernando Seferlis	Aston Martin Vantage GT4	1	13
25	(United States) Kurt Fazekas	Porsche 911 GT3 Cup	1	12
–	(United States) Larry Funk	BMW M3	0	–

=== TA4 ===
Pos	Driver	Car	Starts	Points
1	(United States) Brian Kleeman	Ford Mustang	11	336
2	(United States) Todd Napieralski	Chevrolet Camaro	11	297
3	(United States) JR Pesek	Ford Mustang	8	190
4	(United States) Chris Outzen	Ford Mustang	8	184
5	(United States) Steven Davison	Aston Martin Vantage GT4	8	168
6	(United States) Andrew Entwistle	Ford Mustang	4	89
7	(United States) Mel Shaw	Chevrolet Camaro	4	69
8	(United States) James Pesek	Ford Mustang	3	59
9	(United States) Joe Bogetich	Chevrolet Camaro	3	53
10	(United States) Bill Baten	Chevrolet Camaro	2	40
11	(United States) Shane Lewis	Ford Mustang	1	35
12	(United States) Ramin Abdolvahabi	Aston Martin Vantage GT4	1	29
13	(United States) Mike Geldart	Ford Mustang	1	28
14	(United States) Guy Dreier	Maserati GranTurismo GT4	1	28
15	(Panama) Fernando Seferlis	Chevrolet Camaro	1	20

== Driver standings (West Coast championship) ==
=== TA ===
Pos	Driver	Car	Starts	Points
1	(United States) Greg Pickett	Ford Mustang	4	119
2	(United States) Tomy Drissi	Chevrolet Corvette	3	103
3	(United States) Richard Wall	Chevrolet Corvette	2	52
4	(United States) Kyle Kelley	Chevrolet Corvette	2	48
5	(United States) Ken Davis	Chevrolet Corvette	3	33
6	(Canada) Brian Richards	Chevrolet Corvette	1	29
7	(United States) Adam Carolla	Chevrolet Corvette	1	25

=== TA2 ===
Pos	Driver	Car	Starts	Points
1	(United States) Shane Lewis	Ford Mustang	4	130
2	(United States) Bob McAllister	Ford Mustang	4	108
3	(United States) Justin Napoleon	Chevrolet Camaro	4	95
4	(United States) Joe Napoleon	Chevrolet Camaro	4	78
5	(United States) Chris Cook	Chevrolet Camaro	3	71
6	(United States) David Smith	Chevrolet Camaro	2	40
7	(United States) Thomas Merrill	Ford Mustang	1	27
–	(United States) Lou Gigliotti	Chevrolet Camaro	0	–

=== TA3 ===
Pos	Driver	Car	Starts	Points
1	(United States) Oli Thordarson	Chevrolet Corvette	3	87
2	(United States) Tyler McQuarrie	Lamborghini Gallardo	1	35
2	(United States) Bill Brinkop	Chevrolet Corvette	1	35
2	(United States) Steve Streimer	Dodge Viper	1	35
5	(United States) Guy Dreier	Maserati GranTurismo GT4	1	14

=== TA4 ===
Pos	Driver	Car	Starts	Points
1	(United States) Guy Dreier	Maserati GranTurismo GT4	3	87
2	(Canada) Tim Brown	Ford Mustang	1	3
