= Ernie Francis Jr. =

American racing driver (born 1998)

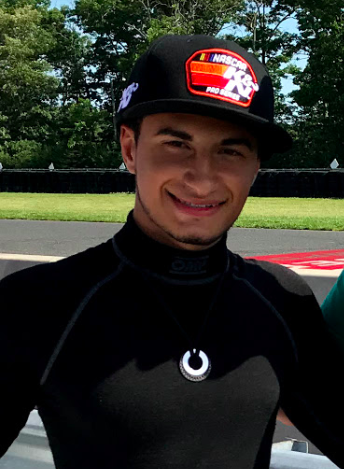
- Francis at New Jersey Motorsports Park in 2018
- Nationality: (United States) American
- Born: January 23, 1998 (age 28) Davie, Florida, U.S.
- Categorisation: FIA Gold

Indy Lights career
- 16 races run over 2 years
- Team: No. 99 (HMD Motorsports with Force Indy)
- First race: 2022 Indy Lights Grand Prix of St. Petersburg (St. Petersburg)
- Last race: 2023 Indy NXT Grand Prix of Indianapolis (Indianapolis)
Wins	Podiums	Poles
0	1	0

Previous series
- 2013–21 2021 2021 2018 2017 2017 2013–17: Trans-Am Series; Superstar Racing Experience; Formula Regional Americas Championship; NASCAR K&N Pro Series East; SprintX GT Championship Series; NASCAR Xfinity Series; Pirelli World Challenge

Championship titles
- 2014–2020: Trans-Am Series

Ernie Francis Jr. (born January 23, 1998) is an American sports car racing and stock car racing driver who last competed in the Lamborghini Super Trofeo. He previously ran full time in the Trans-Am Series, running the 98 car for Breathless Racing, where he is a seven-time champion. In 2021, he competed in the Formula Regional Americas Championship running the 98 car for Future Star Racing, and in the inaugural Superstar Racing Experience, driving the No. 2 car. He became the youngest winner in the SRX series when he won at Lucas Oil Raceway. He secured second place in the SRX championship. When he is not racing, he works at the family race shop - Breathless Racing Team - run by his father (Ernie Francis Sr.) and stepmother (Monica Zima Francis) in Davie, FL. He has also competed part-time in NASCAR in the past in both the Xfinity Series and the East Series.

== Racing career ==
=== NASCAR Xfinity Series ===
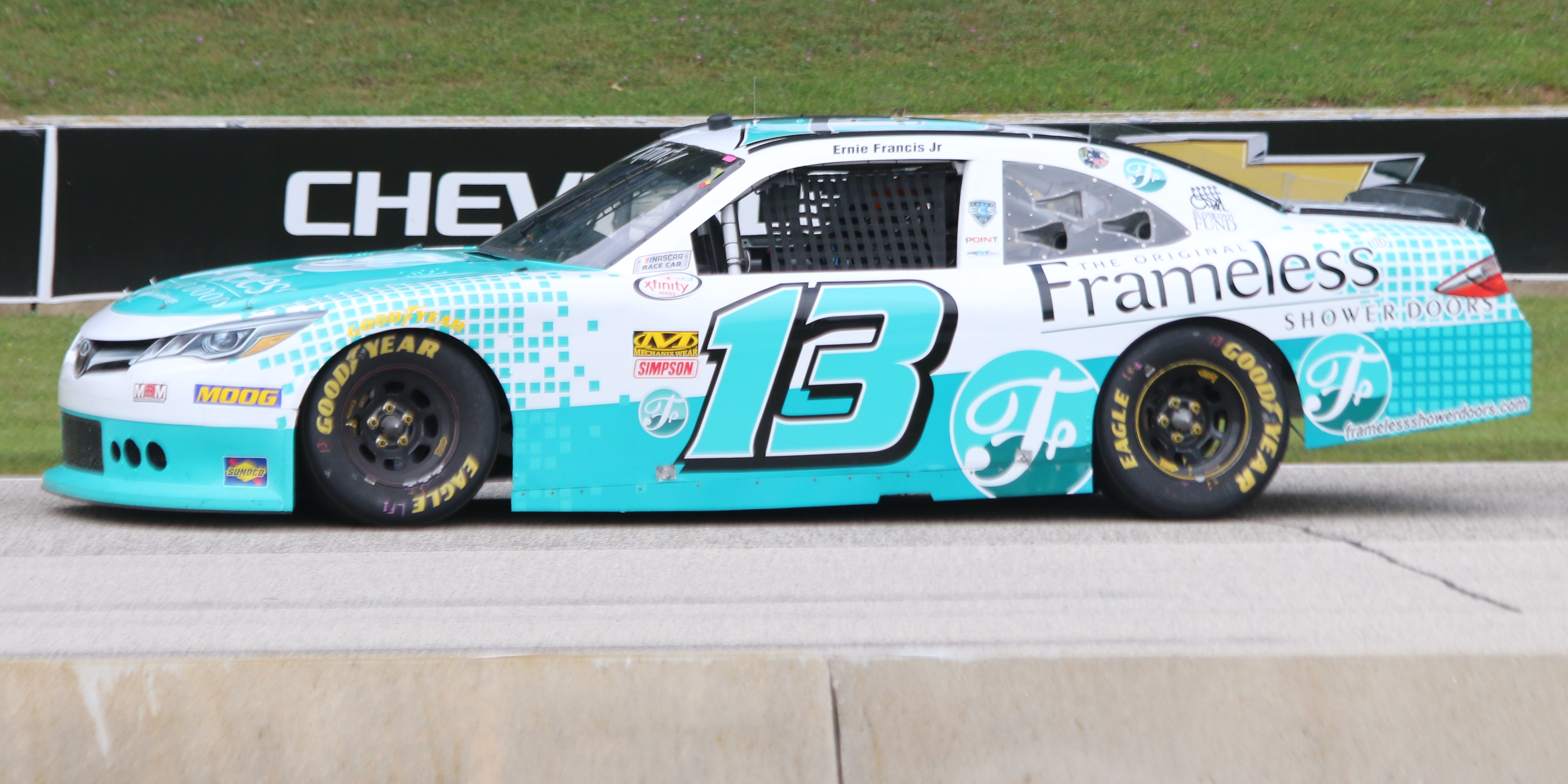
Francis' 2017 Xfinity car at Road America

In 2017, Francis made his NASCAR debut, driving the No. 13 Toyota for MBM Motorsports in a partnership with NextGen Motorsports. at Road America. He started 38th and finished 39th due to engine problems.

=== NASCAR K&N Pro Series East ===
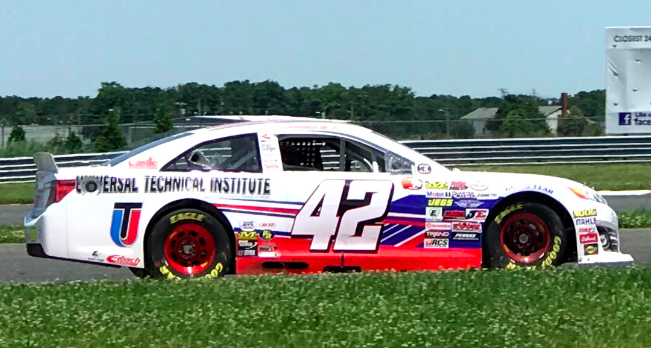
Francis' 2018 K&N East car at New Jersey Motorsports Park

In 2018, Francis began racing in the Pro Series East, driving the No. 42 Toyota for Max Siegel's Rev Racing team. He began on the pole position at Millville and finished second to Will Rodgers. He returned for the Watkins Glen race, where he started 19th and finished 11th.

In 2019, Francis returned to Siegel's Rev Racing team as part of the Drive for Diversity driver development program.

=== Trans Am Series ===
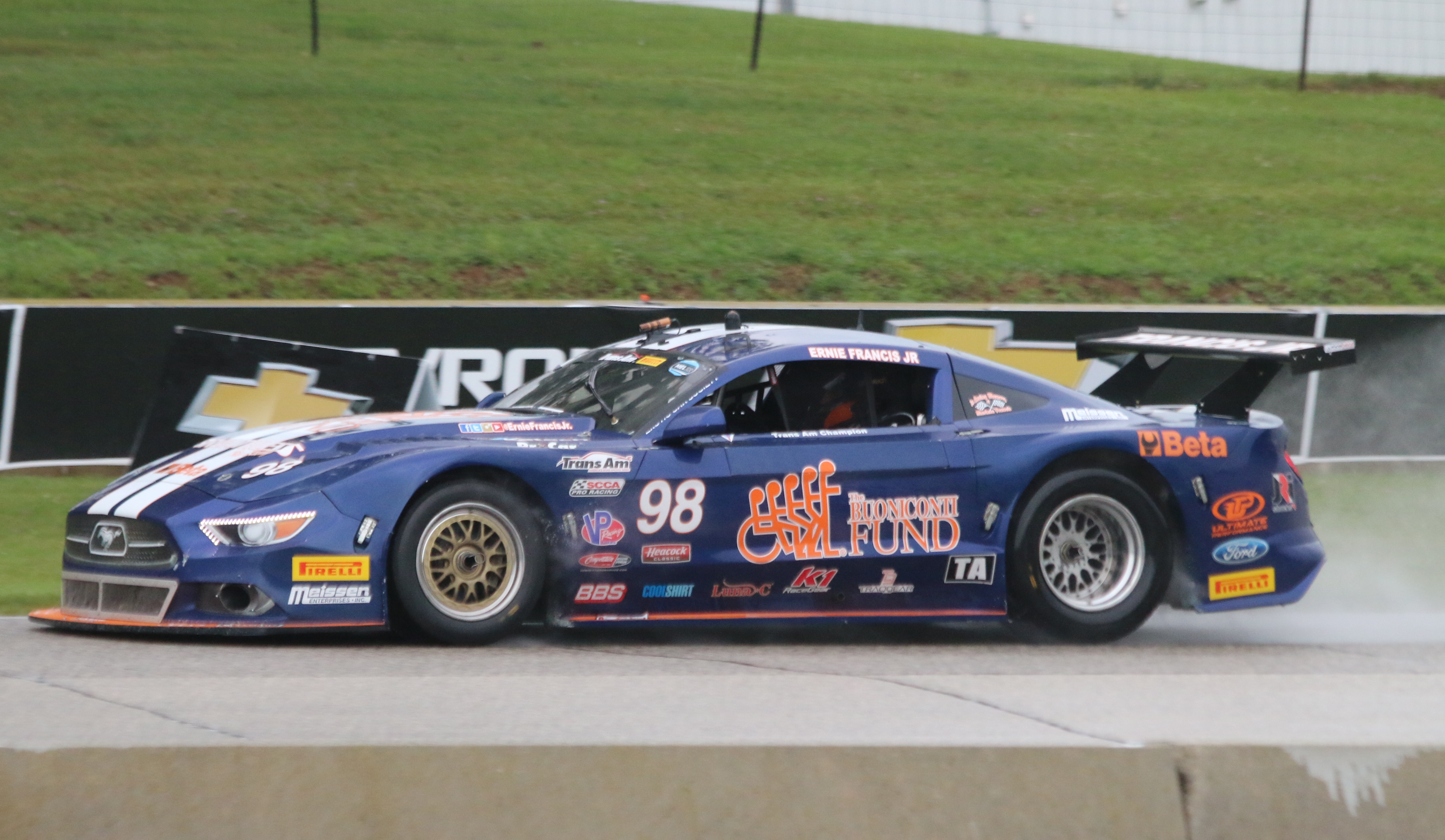
Francis' 2017 Trans Am car at Road America

Francis has won seven consecutive Trans-Am Series championships.

=== Indy Lights ===
For the 2022 racing season, Francis signed to drive for the Force Indy team in the Indy Lights series. Francis' hiring came as part of an initiative by the Force Indy team to give African-American drivers and mechanics opportunities to enter open-wheel racing.

== Awards ==
- Francis was inducted to the Trans-Am Series Hall of Fame in 2025.

== Motorsports career results ==
=== Career summary ===
Season	Series	Team	Races	Wins	Poles	F/Laps	Podiums	Points	Position
2013	Trans-Am Series - TA3	Breathless Performance	1	0	1	1	1	18	18th
2013	Pirelli World Challenge - GTS	Breathless Performance	2	0	0	0	0	64	43rd
2013	Pirelli World Challenge - TCB	Breathless Performance	14	7	7	6	9	1345	**3rd**
2014	Trans-Am Series - TA3A	Breathless Performance	9	5	7	7	9	316	**1st**
2014	Pirelli World Challenge - GTS	Breathless Performance	1	0	0	0	0	0	40th
2014	Pirelli World Challenge - TCA	Breathless Performance	13	3	0	3	11	1366	**3rd**
2015	Trans-Am Series - TA3A	Breathless Performance	12	8	12	10	8	249	**1st**
2015	Pirelli World Challenge - TC	Breathless Performance	18	4	4	5	10	1621	**2nd**
2016	Trans-Am Series - TA3	Breathless Performance	2	0	1	1	1	54	16th
2016	Trans-Am Series - TA4	Breathless Performance	10	9	8	10	10	338	**1st**
2016	Pirelli World Challenge - GTS	Breathless Racing	4	0	0	0	0	268	21st
2016	Pirelli World Challenge - TC	Breathless Racing	2	0	0	0	0	37	32nd
2017	Trans-Am Series - TA	Breathless Pro Racing	13	10	7	10	11	386	**1st**
2017	NASCAR Xfinity Series	MBM Motorsports	1	0	0	0	0	1	84th
2017	Pirelli World Challenge - GTS	PF Racing	4	0	0	0	1	59	19th
2017	SprintX GT Championship Series - GTS Pro-Am	PF Racing	1	1	0	1	1	25	**3rd**
2018	Trans-Am Series - TA	Breathless Racing	11	5	3	3	7	279	**1st**
2018	Trans-Am Series - TA2	ECC Motorsports	5	0	0	0	1	88	15th
2018	NASCAR K&N Pro Series East	Max Siegel	2	0	1	0	1	76	28th
2019	Trans-Am Series - TA	Breathless Racing	11	4	5	4	8	316	**1st**
2020	Trans-Am Series - TA	Breathless Pro Racing	9	4	3	4	6	253	**1st**
2021	Formula Regional Americas Championship	Future Star Racing	18	3	0	0	4	160	**3rd**
2021	Trans-Am Series - TA	Future Star Racing	11	1	4	4	4	257	**3rd**
2021	SRX Series	N/A	6	1	0	1	2	192	**2nd**
2022	Indy Lights	Force Indy	14	0	0	0	0	299	10th
2022	SRX Series	N/A	3	0	0	0	0	58	11th
2023	Indy NXT	HMD Motorsports with Force Indy	13	0	0	0	1	300	9th
2023	SRX Series	N/A	1	0	0	0	0	0	NC†
2024	Lamborghini Super Trofeo North America - Pro	TR3 Racing	6	2	1	?	5	70*	**2nd***
2025	Lamborghini Super Trofeo North America - Pro	Alliance Racing	8	0	0	0	0	33	10th
2026	Lamborghini Super Trofeo North America - Pro	Alliance Racing	2	0	0	0	1	14	18th
2026	Lamborghini Super Trofeo North America - Pro	Breathless Racing	2	0	0	0	0	14	18th

=== SCCA National Championship Runoffs ===
Year	Track	Car	Engine	Class	Finish	Start	Status
2019	VIR	Ford Mustang	Ford	GT-1	1	2	Running
2020	Road America	Ford Mustang	Ford	GT-1	12	1	Retired

=== NASCAR ===
(key) (Bold – Pole position awarded by qualifying time. Italics – Pole position earned by points standings or practice time. * – Most laps led.)

==== Xfinity Series ====
NASCAR Xfinity Series results
Year	Team	No.	Make	1	2	3	4	5	6	7	8	9	10	11	12	13	14	15	16	17	18	19	20	21	22	23	24	25	26	27	28	29	30	31	32	33	NXSC	Pts	Ref
2017	MBM Motorsports	13	Toyota	DAY	ATL	LVS	PHO	CAL	TEX	BRI	RCH	TAL	CLT	DOV	POC	MCH	IOW	DAY	KEN	NHA	IND	IOW	GLN	MOH	BRI	ROA; 39	DAR	RCH	CHI	KEN	DOV	CLT	KAN	TEX	PHO	HOM	84th	1	

==== K&N Pro Series East ====
NASCAR K&N Pro Series East results
Year	Team	No.	Make	1	2	3	4	5	6	7	8	9	10	11	12	13	14	NKNPSEC	Pts	Ref
2018	Rev Racing	42	Toyota	NSM	BRI	LGY	SBO	SBO	MEM	**NJM**; 2	TMP	NHA	IOW	GLN; 11	GTW	NHA	DOV	28th	76	

=== Superstar Racing Experience ===
(key) * – Most laps led. ^{1} – Heat 1 winner. ^{2} – Heat 2 winner.

Superstar Racing Experience results
Year	No.	1	2	3	4	5	6	SRXC	Pts
2021	2	STA; 6	KNX; 3	ELD; 8	IRP; 1*	SLG; 6	NSV; 6	2nd	161
2022	5	FIF; 11	SBO; 7	STA	NSV			11th	58
2022	99					I55; 6	SHA	11th	58
2023	99	STA	STA II	MMS	BER	ELD	IRP; 11	25th	0^{1}

=== American open-wheel racing results ===
(key)

==== Indy Lights/Indy NXT ====
Year	Team	1	2	3	4	5	6	7	8	9	10	11	12	13	14	Rank	Points
2022	Force Indy	STP; 7	ALA; 8	IMS; 9	IMS; 10	DET; 9	DET; 10	RDA; 10	MOH; 11	IOW; 8	NSH; 11	GTW; 9	POR; 8	LAG; 11	LAG; 13	10th	299
2023	HMD Motorsports with Force Indy	STP; 6	ALA; 8	IMS1	DET; 3	DET; 7	RDA; 12	MOH; 13	IOW; 8	NSH; 18	IMS2; 14	GTW; 8	POR; 7	LAG; 7	LAG; 8	9th	300

^{*} Season still in progress
