= 2014 Trans-Am Series =

American sports car racing competition

Seasons
- ← 2013 2015 →

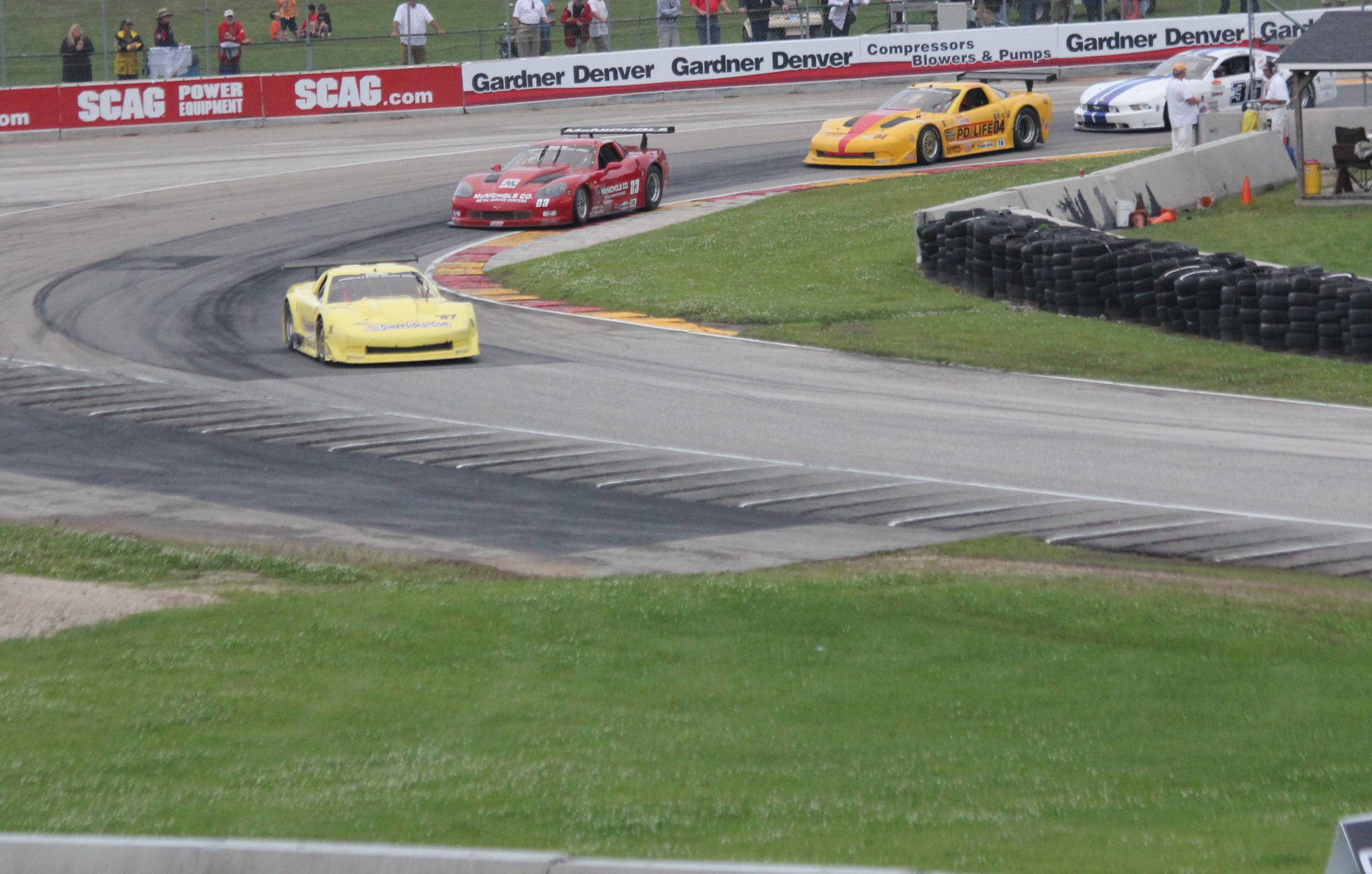
Lead cars from round 6 at Road America

The 2014 Trans-Am Series was the 46th running of the Sports Car Club of America's Trans-Am Series. It began March 2, 2014. The series featured TA, TA2, and TA3 groups, with TA3 split into two sub-groups. TA3-International was for select cars meeting SCCA GT-2 class rules, while TA3-American Muscle was for current-generation "pony cars" meeting NASA's American Iron class specifications.

In the main TA class, the top four championship positions as well as all race victories were taken by drivers competing in Chevrolet Corvettes. It was won by defending champion Doug Peterson, who won five races over the course of the season. Peterson won the championship by 33 points ahead of 2012 champion Simon Gregg, who finished every race with a top-five finish without winning a race. One point further behind in third place was Amy Ruman, who won races at New Jersey Motorsports Park and Daytona International Speedway; Ruman's latter victory ensured she became the first woman to claim a solo overall victory in a professional automobile race at Daytona. Other victories were taken by drivers who did not contest the whole season; Paul Fix won successive races at Lime Rock and Virginia International Raceway, while R. J. López and Ron Fellows won on one-off appearances at Homestead and Canadian Tire Motorsport Park respectively.

Cameron Lawrence won a second successive TA2 title, winning seven races at the wheel of a Chevrolet Camaro, and latterly in the season, a Dodge Challenger. Cameron Lawrence finished 21 points clear of Adam Andretti, a three-time race winner at the wheel of a Camaro (and the first member of the famous Andretti family to ever compete in the Trans Am Series). Third place went to the only other winner in the class, Ron Keith, who won at Brainerd. TA3-International class honors went to Jason Berkeley, a three-time race winner during the season. He won the class by six points ahead of Norman Betts, who won at Canadian Tire Motorsport Park. A further eight points behind in third place was Russ Snow, who won races at Road Atlanta and Daytona. Other drivers to win races were Lee Saunders, who won at Sebring and Mid-Ohio, while single race wins were taken by Jerry Greene (Brainerd), Clint Sawinski (Road America) and Michael Camus (Homestead).

Six wins in the final seven races was enough to give Ernie Francis Jr. the class title in TA3-International. Francis finished 50 points clear of his nearest rival in class, Chuck Cassaro. Todd Napieralski finished a further four points behind in third place, having won at Road Atlanta and Brainerd. The only other winners in class were Dean Martin, who won the opening two Floridian races at Sebring and Homestead, and Joe Chan, who won at Canadian Tire Motorsport Park. In the Manufacturers' Championships, Chevrolet won all four titles on offer.

== Schedule ==
The 2014 schedule was announced January 1, 2014.

== Calendar and results ==
Round	Circuit	Date	TA Winning driver	TA Winning vehicle	TA2 Winning driver	TA2 Winning vehicle	TA3-I Winning driver	TA3-I Winning vehicle	TA3-A Winning driver	TA3-A Winning vehicle
1	Sebring International Raceway	March 2	(United States) Doug Peterson	Chevrolet Corvette	(United States) Cameron Lawrence	Chevrolet Camaro	(United States) Lee Saunders	Dodge Viper	(United States) Dean Martin	Ford Mustang
2	Homestead-Miami Speedway	March 9	(Dominican Republic) R. J. López	Chevrolet Corvette	(United States) Cameron Lawrence	Chevrolet Camaro	(United States) Michael Camus	BMW M3	(United States) Dean Martin	Ford Mustang
3	Road Atlanta	May 10	(United States) Doug Peterson	Chevrolet Corvette	(United States) Adam Andretti	Chevrolet Camaro	(United States) Russ Snow	Chevrolet Corvette	(United States) Todd Napieralski	Chevrolet Camaro
4	Canadian Tire Motorsport Park	May 18	(Canada) Ron Fellows	Chevrolet Corvette	(United States) Cameron Lawrence	Chevrolet Camaro	(United States) Norman Betts	Chevrolet Corvette	(Canada) Joe Chan	Chevrolet Camaro
5	New Jersey Motorsports Park	June 1	(United States) Amy Ruman	Chevrolet Corvette	(United States) Cameron Lawrence	Chevrolet Camaro	(United States) Jason Berkeley	Chevrolet Corvette	(United States) Ernie Francis Jr.	Chevrolet Camaro
6	Road America	June 21	(United States) Doug Peterson	Chevrolet Corvette	(United States) Cameron Lawrence	Chevrolet Camaro	(United States) Clint Sawinski	Porsche 911 GT3 Cup	(United States) Ernie Francis Jr.	Chevrolet Camaro
7	Mid-Ohio Sports Car Course	August 16	(United States) Doug Peterson	Chevrolet Corvette	(United States) Adam Andretti	Chevrolet Camaro	(United States) Lee Saunders	Dodge Viper	(United States) Ernie Francis Jr.	Chevrolet Camaro
8	Brainerd International Raceway	August 31	(United States) Doug Peterson	Chevrolet Corvette	(United States) Ron Keith	Ford Mustang	(United States) Jerry Greene	Porsche 911 GT3 Cup	(United States) Todd Napieralski	Chevrolet Camaro
9	Lime Rock Park	September 20	(United States) Paul Fix	Chevrolet Corvette	(United States) Cameron Lawrence	Dodge Challenger	(United States) Jason Berkeley	Chevrolet Corvette	(United States) Ernie Francis Jr.	Chevrolet Camaro
10	Virginia International Raceway	September 28	(United States) Paul Fix	Chevrolet Corvette	(United States) Adam Andretti	Chevrolet Camaro	(United States) Jason Berkeley	Chevrolet Corvette	(United States) Ernie Francis Jr.	Chevrolet Camaro
11	Daytona International Speedway	November 15	(United States) Amy Ruman	Chevrolet Corvette	(United States) Cameron Lawrence	Dodge Challenger	(United States) Russ Snow	Chevrolet Corvette	(United States) Ernie Francis Jr.	Chevrolet Camaro

== Series development ==
It was announced on January 10, 2014, that Hoosier would become the control tire supplier for Trans-Am.

== Driver standings ==
=== TA ===
Pos	Driver	Car	Starts	Points
1	(United States) Doug Peterson	Chevrolet Corvette	11	302
2	(United States) Simon Gregg	Chevrolet Corvette	11	269
3	(United States) Amy Ruman	Chevrolet Corvette	11	268
4	(United States) Kerry Hitt	Chevrolet Corvette	11	202
5	(United States) Cliff Ebben	Ford Mustang	8	196
6	(United States) John Baucom	Ford Mustang	8	171
7	(United States) Jim McAleese	Chevrolet Corvette	9	168
8	(United States) Mary Wright	Chevrolet Corvette	10	156
9	(United States) David Pintaric	Chevrolet Corvette	9	122
10	(United States) Paul Fix	Chevrolet Corvette	3	87
11	(United States) Kurt Roehrig	Chevrolet Corvette	6	82
12	(United States) Kenny Bupp	Chevrolet Corvette	5	81
13	(United States) Tom Ellis	Ford Mustang	6	75
14	(Canada) Allan Lewis	Chevrolet Corvette	4	73
15	(United States) Tim Rubright	Ford Mustang	4	61
16	(United States) Richard Grant	Chevrolet Corvette	4	56
17	(United States) Denny Lamers	Ford Mustang	3	51
18	(United States) Jon Leavy	Chevrolet Camaro	3	46
19	(United States) Charles Wicht	Chevrolet Corvette	3	41
20	(Dominican Republic) R. J. López	Chevrolet Corvette	1	35
20	(Canada) Ron Fellows	Chevrolet Corvette	1	35
22	(United States) Henry Gilbert	Chevrolet Corvette	3	34
23	(Canada) Andrew Romocki	Chevrolet Corvette	2	27
24	(United States) Tony Ave	Chevrolet Corvette	1	25
24	(United States) A. J. Henriksen	Chevrolet Corvette	1	25
26	(Argentina) Claudio Burtin	Chevrolet Corvette	1	23
27	(United States) Tomy Drissi	Chevrolet Corvette	1	22
28	(United States) Tom Smith	Chevrolet Camaro	1	21
29	(United States) Jake Parrott	Chevrolet Camaro	1	20
30	(United States) David Fershtand	Chevrolet Corvette	1	19
31	(United States) Jay Shuler	Ford Mustang	1	18
31	(United States) Vincent Allegretta	Chevrolet Camaro	1	18
33	(United States) Dane Smith	Chevrolet Camaro	1	17
34	(United States) Ted Sullivan	Chevrolet Camaro	1	14
35	(United States) Bryan Long	Chevrolet Corvette	1	10

=== TA2 ===
Pos	Driver	Car	Starts	Points
1	(United States) Cameron Lawrence	Chevrolet Camaro/Dodge Challenger	11	310
2	(United States) Adam Andretti	Chevrolet Camaro	11	289
3	(United States) Ron Keith	Ford Mustang	10	228
4	(Canada) Kevin Poitras	Chevrolet Camaro	11	228
5	(United States) Bob Stretch	Chevrolet Camaro	10	184
6	(United States) Tom West	Chevrolet Camaro	9	176
7	(United States) Mel Shaw	Chevrolet Camaro	11	168
8	(United States) Tom Sheehan	Chevrolet Camaro	10	158
9	(United States) Frank Lussier	Chevrolet Camaro	8	130
10	(United States) Joe Ebben	Ford Mustang	5	95
11	(United States) Nathan Stokey	Chevrolet Camaro	5	95
12	(United States) A. J. Henriksen	Chevrolet Camaro	5	84
13	(United States) Brian LaCroix	Chevrolet Camaro	5	74
14	(United States) Gar Robinson	Chevrolet Camaro	3	69
15	(United States) Tommy Kendall	Dodge Challenger	4	60
16	(United States) John Atwell	Chevrolet Camaro	4	57
17	(United States) David Mazyck	Chevrolet Camaro	5	55
18	(United States) Tim Gray	Chevrolet Camaro	4	47
19	(United States) Aaron Quine	Ford Mustang	3	46
20	(United States) Allen Milarcik	Chevrolet Camaro	4	46
21	(Australia) Geoff Fane	Chevrolet Camaro	2	39
22	(United States) Tommy Archer	Dodge Challenger	2	37
23	(Canada) Mike McGahern	Chevrolet Camaro	3	37
24	(United States) Britt Casey	Chevrolet Camaro	2	32
25	(United States) Steve Kent Jr.	Ford Mustang/Chevrolet Camaro	2	30
26	(Canada) Harry Steenbakkers	Chevrolet Camaro	2	29
27	(United States) Bobby Kennedy	Ford Mustang	1	27
28	(United States) Ty Dillon	Chevrolet Camaro	2	27
29	(United States) Wally Dallenbach Jr.	Chevrolet Camaro	1	25
30	(United States) Michael Defontes	Ford Mustang	2	24
31	(United States) Brad Roudebush	Chevrolet Camaro	2	23
32	(United States) Greg Socha	Chevrolet Camaro	2	23
33	(United States) Joe Fitos	Chevrolet Camaro	2	22
34	(United States) Gregg Rodgers	Chevrolet Camaro	1	20
35	(United States) Tony Buffomante	Chevrolet Camaro	1	20
36	(United States) Justin Napoleon	Chevrolet Camaro	2	20
37	(United States) Kenneth Quartuccio	Chevrolet Camaro	1	19
37	(United States) Keith Prociuk	Chevrolet Camaro	1	19
39	(United States) Joe Napoleon	Chevrolet Camaro	1	19
40	(United States) Bruse Nesbitt	Ford Mustang	1	16
41	(United States) Jed Copham	Chevrolet Camaro	1	15
42	(United States) Joe Stevens	Chevrolet Camaro	1	12
43	(Antigua and Barbuda) Carlo Falcone	Chevrolet Camaro	1	9
44	(United States) Lawrence Loshak	Ford Mustang	1	8
45	(United States) Scott Ferguson	Chevrolet Camaro	1	1

=== TA3 ===
==== International ====
Pos	Driver	Car	Starts	Points
1	(United States) Jason Berkeley	Chevrolet Corvette	8	201
2	(United States) Norman Betts	Chevrolet Corvette	7	195
3	(United States) Russ Snow	Chevrolet Corvette	7	187
4	(United States) Lee Saunders	Dodge Viper	3	97
5	(United States) Tim Gray	Porsche 911 GT3	3	75
6	(United States) Jerry Greene	Porsche 911 GT3 Cup	3	70
7	(United States) Clint Sawinski	Porsche 911 GT3 Cup	2	62
8	(United States) Mark Klenin	Aston Martin GT4	2	52
9	(United States) Milton Grant	Porsche 997	2	35
10	(United States) Michael Camus	BMW M3	1	33
11	(United States) Joe Aquillante	Chevrolet Corvette	1	29
12	(United States) David Tuaty	BMW M3	1	28
13	(United States) David Mazyck	Dodge Viper	1	27
14	(United States) Mickey Mills	BMW M3	2	23
15	(United States) Hugh Boocher	Chevrolet Corvette	1	20
16	(United States) Preston Calvert	Chevrolet Corvette	1	13

==== American Muscle ====
Pos	Driver	Car	Starts	Points
1	(United States) Ernie Francis Jr.	Chevrolet Camaro	10	316
2	(United States) Chuck Cassaro	Ford Mustang	11	266
3	(United States) Todd Napieralski	Chevrolet Camaro	10	262
4	(United States) Dean Martin	Ford Mustang	3	102
5	(United States) Chris DeSalvo	Ford Mustang	4	97
6	(United States) Thomas Ellis	Ford Mustang	5	79
7	(United States) Joseph Rosenheck	Ford Mustang	3	64
8	(United States) Mike Geldart	Ford Mustang	2	47
9	(Canada) Joe Chan	Chevrolet Camaro	1	32
