= 2016 Trans-Am Series =

American sports car racing competition

The 2016 Trans-Am Series was the 48th running of the Sports Car Club of America's Trans-Am Series. It is the 50th anniversary of the series' first season

== Rule changes ==
The Ford Mustang and Chevrolet Camaro will receive updated bodywork for TA2 class entries in 2016

TA and TA2 continue essentially unchanged. TA3-I has been renamed TA3 for 2016. TA3-A has been renamed TA4. The new TA5 class has been created for Porsche Carrera Cup cars. Due to increased size of its field, TA2 will have separate race and qualifying sessions than the rest of the series at 11 of the 12 rounds of the championship.

After Round 4 the TA5 class was discontinued and the Porsche Cup cars were rolled back into TA3.

Amy Ruman made history for the third time by becoming the first woman ever to win two consecutive Trans Am Series Championships, in addition to her unprecedented first Trans Am Series win in 2011.

== Schedule ==
The initial schedule was announced November 2, 2015, with an additional event in Detroit announced on March 21, 2016. The Detroit round was invitational due to space constraints and will not count for championship points.

=== Calendar and results ===
Round	Circuit	Date	TA Winning driver	TA Winning vehicle	TA2 Winning driver	TA2 Winning vehicle	TA3 Winning driver	TA3 Winning vehicle	TA4 Winning driver	TA4 Winning vehicle	TA5 Winning driver	TA5 Winning vehicle
1	Sebring International Raceway	March 5	(United States) Kenny Bupp	Chevrolet Camaro	(United States) Gar Robinson	Chevrolet Camaro	(United States) Lee Saunders	Dodge Viper	(United States) Ernie Francis Jr.	Ford Mustang	(United States) Mark Boden	Porsche 997
2	Road Atlanta	April 10	(United States) Amy Ruman	Chevrolet Corvette	(United States) Tony Buffomante	Ford Mustang	(United States) Randy Mueller	BMW M3	(United States) Ernie Francis Jr.	Ford Mustang	(United States) Conor Flynn	Porsche 997
3	Watkins Glen International	May 15	(United States) Amy Ruman	Chevrolet Corvette	(United States) Dillon Machavern	Chevrolet Camaro	(United States) Mark Boden	BMW M3	(United States) Ernie Francis Jr.	Ford Mustang	(United States) Tim Kezman	Porsche 997
NC	Motor City 100	June 4	(Dominican Republic) R. J. López	Chevrolet Corvette	(Canada) Kyle Marcelli	Chevrolet Camaro	not held		(United States) Dean Martin	Ford Mustang	not held	
NC	Motor City 100	June 5	(United States) John Baucom	Ford Mustang	(United States) Adam Andretti	Dodge Challenger	not held		(United States) Ernie Francis Jr.	Ford Mustang	not held	
4	New Jersey Motorsports Park	June 12	(United States) Paul Fix	Chevrolet Corvette	(United States) Tony Buffomante	Ford Mustang	(United States) Andrew Aquilante	Chevrolet Corvette	(United States) Ernie Francis Jr.	Ford Mustang	(United States) Tim Kezman	Porsche 997
5	Brainerd International Raceway	July 3	(United States) Paul Fix	Chevrolet Corvette	(United States) Gar Robinson	Chevrolet Camaro	(United States) Steve Streimer	Dodge Viper	(United States) Ernie Francis Jr.	Ford Mustang	no entries	
6	Mid-Ohio Sports Car Course	August 13	(United States) Simon Gregg	Chevrolet Corvette	(United States) Lawrence Loshak	Chevrolet Camaro	(United States) Randy Mueller	BMW M3	(United States) Ernie Francis Jr.	Ford Mustang	no entries	
7	Road America	August 27	(United States) Cliff Ebben	Ford Mustang	(United States) Tony Buffomante	Ford Mustang	(United States) Mark Boden	Porsche 997	(United States) Ernie Francis Jr.	Ford Mustang	no entries	
8	Virginia International Raceway	September 24	(United States) Paul Fix	Chevrolet Corvette	(United States) Tony Buffomante	Ford Mustang	(United States) Randy Mueller	BMW M3	(United States) Ernie Francis Jr.	Ford Mustang	no entries	
9	Homestead-Miami Speedway	October 9	(United States) Cliff Ebben	Ford Mustang	(United States) Shane Lewis	Chevrolet Camaro	(United States) Michael Camus	BMW M3	(United States) Ernie Francis Jr.	Ford Mustang	no entries	
10	NOLA Motorsports Park	October 15	(United States) Paul Fix	Chevrolet Corvette	(United States) Tony Buffomante	Ford Mustang	(United States) Steve Streimer	Dodge Viper	(United States) Dave Ricci	Chevrolet Camaro	no entries	
11	Circuit of the Americas	November 5	(United States) Paul Fix	Chevrolet Corvette	(United States) Dillon Machavern	Ford Mustang	(United States) Tim Kezman	Porsche 997	(United States) Todd Napieralski	Ford Mustang	no entries	
12	Daytona International Speedway	November 12	(United States) Amy Ruman	Chevrolet Corvette	(United States) Shane Lewis	Chevrolet Camaro	(United States) Lee Saunders	Dodge Viper	(United States) Cameron Maugeri	Ford Mustang	no entries	

== Driver standings ==
=== TA ===
Pos	Driver	Car	Starts	Points
1	(United States) Amy Ruman	Chevrolet Corvette	12	299
2	(United States) Paul Fix	Chevrolet Corvette	12	290
3	(United States) Simon Gregg	Chevrolet Corvette	12	248
4	(United States) David Pintaric	Chevrolet Corvette/Cadillac CTS-V	12	246
5	(United States) Cliff Ebben	Ford Mustang	11	245
6	(United States) Kerry Hitt	Cadillac CTS-V	12	223
7	(United States) Jim McAleese	Chevrolet Corvette	10	209
8	(Argentina) Claudio Burtin	Chevrolet Corvette	10	187
9	(United States) Vincent Allegretta	Chevrolet Corvette	10	179
10	(United States) John Baucom	Ford Mustang	8	155
11	(United States) Mickey Wright	Chevrolet Corvette	10	131
12	(United States) Tim Rubright	Chevrolet Corvette/Ford Mustang	8	124
13	(United States) Joseph Freda	Chevrolet Corvette	7	118
14	(United States) Richard Grant	Chevrolet Corvette	6	95
15	(Dominican Republic) R. J. López	Chevrolet Corvette	5	85
16	(United States) Charles Wicht	Chevrolet Corvette	5	80
17	(United States) A. J. Henriksen	Chevrolet Corvette	3	62
18	(United States) Henry Gilbert	Chevrolet Corvette	4	56
19	(United States) Jon Leavy	Chevrolet Camaro	3	51
20	(Canada) Allan Lewis	Chevrolet Corvette	3	47
21	(United States) Kenny Bupp	Chevrolet Camaro	2	45
22	(United States) Denny Lamers	Ford Mustang	2	42
23	(United States) Daniel Urrutia	Chevrolet Corvette	2	40
24	(United States) Steve Burns	Ford Mustang	2	38
25	(United States) David Fershtand	Chevrolet Corvette	2	37
26	(United States) Greg Pickett	Jaguar XKR	1	25
27	(United States) Jed Copham	Chevrolet Corvette	1	15
28	(United States) Michael Lewis	Jaguar XKR	1	13
29	(United States) Todd Peterson	Ford Mustang	1	13
30	(United States) Thomas Ellis	Ford Mustang	1	13
-	(Panama) Oscar Terán	Jaguar XKR	0	0

=== TA2 ===
Pos	Driver	Car	Starts	Points
1	(United States) Tony Buffomante	Ford Mustang	12	303
2	(United States) Shane Lewis	Chevrolet Camaro	12	273
3	(United States) Gar Robinson	Chevrolet Camaro	12	261
4	(United States) Dillon Machavern	Ford Mustang	12	249
5	(United States) Lawrence Loshak	Chevrolet Camaro	12	249
6	(United States) Justin Haley	Chevrolet Camaro/Ford Mustang	12	248
7	(United States) Jordan Bernloehr	Chevrolet Camaro/Dodge Challenger	12	208
8	(United States) Tom Sheehan	Chevrolet Camaro	12	170
9	(Canada) Louis-Phillippe Montour	Chevrolet Camaro	9	167
10	(United States) Keith Prociuk	Chevrolet Camaro	11	136
11	(United States) Adam Andretti	Chevrolet Camaro/Ford Mustang	7	111
12	(United States) Tommy Archer	Chevrolet Camaro	6	109
13	(United States) John Atwell	Chevrolet Camaro	9	109
14	(United States) Tony Ave	Chevrolet Camaro	7	89
15	(Canada) Harry Steenbakkers	Chevrolet Camaro	6	78
16	(United States) Steven Lustig	Ford Mustang	6	76
17	(United States) Brian Kubinski	Chevrolet Camaro	5	60
18	(United States) Tim Gray	Ford Mustang	5	58
19	(United States) Curt Vogt	Chevrolet Camaro	5	57
20	(Canada) Michael McGahern	Chevrolet Camaro	6	56
21	(Canada) Peter Klutt	Dodge Challenger	4	54
22	(United States) Hal Musler	Chevrolet Camaro	5	45
23	(United States) Tõnis Kasemets	Ford Mustang	2	44
24	(Canada) Kevin Poitras	Ford Mustang	5	41
25	(United States) Jordan Bupp	Ford Mustang	3	41
26	(United States) Jason Kennedy	Dodge Challenger	3	39
27	(United States) Tom West	Chevrolet Camaro	5	39
28	(United States) Elias Anderson	Ford Mustang	3	38
29	(United States) Justin Napoleon	Chevrolet Camaro	3	38
30	(United States) Steve Kent Jr.	Chevrolet Camaro	2	37
31	(Canada) Kyle Marcelli	Chevrolet Camaro	2	33
32	(United States) Ron Keith	Ford Mustang	3	33
33	(United States) Ray Nevau	Chevrolet Camaro	3	33
34	(United States) Robert Mesmer	Chevrolet Camaro	4	28
35	(United States) Tony Cook	Chevrolet Camaro	4	26
36	(United States) Joe Napoleon	Chevrolet Camaro	2	24
37	(United States) Chris Pederson	Chevrolet Camaro	2	22
38	(United States) Aaron Quine	Ford Mustang	1	20
39	(United States) Scott Lagasse Jr.	Chevrolet Camaro	1	18
40	(United States) Ben Hocevar	Chevrolet Camaro	1	17
41	(United States) Cole Carlson	Dodge Challenger	1	17
42	(United States) Tyler Thielmen	Ford Mustang	1	16
43	(United States) Allen Milarcik	Chevrolet Camaro	1	12
44	(United States) Bruce Nesbitt	Ford Mustang	1	11
45	(United States) Wally Dallenbach Jr.	Chevrolet Camaro	1	9
46	(Antigua and Barbuda) Carlo Falcone	Ford Mustang	2	7
47	(United States) Joseph Staurovsky	Chevrolet Camaro	3	6
48	(United States) Sam LeComte	Chevrolet Camaro	2	5
49	(Canada) Martin Barkley	Ford Mustang	1	4
50	(United Kingdom) Leo Voyazides	Ford Mustang	1	4
51	(United States) Carl Wingo	Ford Mustang	1	3
52	(United States) Cameron Lawrence	Chevrolet Camaro	1	2
53	(United States) Bobby Kennedy	Ford Mustang	1	1
54	(United States) George Lutich	Ford Mustang	1	1
55	(Canada) Roberto Sabato	Ford Mustang	1	1

=== TA3 ===
TA5 class was discontinued and re-combined with TA3 class after five races. The league published a combined standings table tabulated for the first five races as if TA5 and TA3 were contested as a single class and those standings are reflected here. The league also published separate standings tables for the five races where TA3 and TA5 compete separately as well as only for the seven races where they competed as a combined class. Those standings are available here.

Pos	Driver	Car	Starts	Points
1	(United States) Randy Mueller	BMW M3	12	283
2	(United States) Connor Flynn	Porsche 997	9	197
3	(United States) Kyle Kinsland	Chevrolet Corvette	8	185
4	(United States) Michael Camus	BMW M3	7	166
5	(United States) Tim Kezman	Porsche 997	7	162
6	(United States) Mark Boden	Porsche 997/BMW M3	6	157
7	(United States) Milton Grant	Porsche 997	8	148
8	(United States) Steve Streimer	Dodge Viper	5	144
9	(United States) Mel Shaw	Chevrolet Corvette	9	144
10	(United States) Cindi Lux	Dodge Viper	5	132
11	(United States) Lee Saunders	Dodge Viper	4	116
12	(United States) Larry Funk	BMW M3	6	106
13	(Panama) Fernando Seferlis	Aston Martin GT4	6	98
14	(United States) Jason Berkeley	Chevrolet Corvette	4	85
15	(United States) Russ Snow	Chevrolet Corvette	3	56
16	(United States) Ernie Francis Jr.	Chevrolet Corvette	2	54
17	(United States) Hugh Boocher	Chevrolet Corvette	3	52
18	(United States) Andrew Aquilante	Chevrolet Corvette	1	35
19	(United States) Keith Anderson	Dodge Viper	1	31
20	(United States) Preston Calvert	Chevrolet Corvette	1	23
21	(United States) Aristotle Balogh	BMW M3	1	18
	(United States) Ron Landis	Chevrolet Corvette	0	0

=== TA4 ===
Pos	Driver	Car	Starts	Points
1	(United States) Ernie Francis Jr.	Ford Mustang/Chevrolet Camaro	10	338
2	(United States) Todd Napieralski	Chevrolet Camaro	8	191
3	(United States) Brian Kleeman	Ford Mustang	6	140
4	(United States) Dave Ricci	Chevrolet Camaro	5	130
5	(United States) Rich Jones	Ford Mustang	5	106
6	(United States) Chris Outzen	Ford Mustang	5	95
7	(United States) Tristan Herbert	Chevrolet Camaro	4	89
8	(United States) Mike Geldart	Ford Mustang	3	80
9	(United States) Spencer Caudle	Dodge Challenger	2	41
10	(United States) Cameron Maugeri	Ford Mustang	1	34
11	(United States) Dean Martin	Ford Mustang	1	29
12	(United States) Thomas Ellis	Ford Mustang	1	29
13	(United States) Rob Bodle	Ford Mustang	2	26
14	(United States) Bill Baten	Chevrolet Camaro	1	25
15	(United States) Brian Licklider	Ford Mustang	1	23
16	(United States) Robert Korzen	Ford Mustang	1	23
17	(United States) Nate Stacy	Ford Mustang	1	23
18	(United States) Chris DeSalvo	Ford Mustang	1	20
19	(United States) Trevor Janke	Chevrolet Camaro	1	16
20	(United States) Ted Hight III	Ford Mustang	1	15
21	(United States) Steve Kent Jr.	Ford Mustang	1	3
	(United States) Mark Luna	Ford Mustang	0	0
