= 2020 Trans-Am Series =

American sports car racing competition

The 2020 Trans-Am Series season is the 52nd running of the Trans-Am Series. The National Championship began on March 1 and was planned to run for twelve rounds, before dropping to nine rounds due to the COVID pandemic. Within this championship, a Northern Cup and Southern Cup were also awarded consisting of the point totals from certain rounds for drivers who were not running the full season. A separate West Coast Championship was also held with the majority of the rounds separate from the national series following schedule changes due to the pandemic.

== Entry list ==
=== National Championship ===
TA
Car	No.	Driver	Class	Rounds
Cadillac CTS-V	19	(United States) Kerry Hitt	M	All
Chevrolet Camaro	8	(United States) Tomy Drissi		All
Chevrolet Camaro	17	(Austria) Martin Ragginger	R	8–9
Chevrolet Camaro	18	(United States) Jon Leavy	M	1
Chevrolet Camaro	59	(United States) Simon Gregg		2–3, 7–9
Chevrolet Camaro	87	(United States) Doug Peterson	M	2
Chevrolet Camaro	99	(United States) Justin Marks	R	8–9
Chevrolet Corvette	04	(United States) Matthew Butson		5–6
Chevrolet Corvette	3	(United States) Daniel Urrutia Jr.		1
Chevrolet Corvette	4	(United States) Tony Ave		2
Chevrolet Corvette	7	(United States) Ryan McManus		5–6
Chevrolet Corvette	23	(United States) Amy Ruman		All
Chevrolet Corvette	24	(United States) Matthew Butson		4
Chevrolet Corvette	30	(United States) Richard Grant	M	1–2, 4–9
Chevrolet Corvette	59	(United States) Simon Gregg		1, 4–6
Dodge Challenger	2	(United States) Boris Said		5, 7–9
Dodge Challenger	2	(United States) Paul Menard		6
Dodge Challenger	9	(United States) Jeff Hinkle		2, 5–6, 8–9
Dodge Challenger	43	(United States) Adam Andretti		1
Ford Mustang	6	(United States) Greg Pickett		7
Ford Mustang	20	(United States) Chris Dyson		All
Ford Mustang	21	(United Kingdom) Humaid al Masaood	R	1–7
Ford Mustang	36	(United States) Cliff Ebben	M	4
Ford Mustang	57	(United States) David Pintaric		2
Ford Mustang	66	(United States) Denny Lamers	M	4
Ford Mustang	86	(United States) John Baucom		1–2, 5–6
Ford Mustang	98	(United States) Ernie Francis Jr.		All
TA2
Chevrolet Camaro	02	(United States) John Atwell		1, 7
Chevrolet Camaro	2	(United States) Aaron Pierce		1–2, 8–9
Chevrolet Camaro	7	(United States) Rafa Matos		All
Chevrolet Camaro	8	(United States) Cameron Lawrence		1
Chevrolet Camaro	10	Misha Goikhberg		1, 8–9
Chevrolet Camaro	11	(United States) Doug Winston	R	1
Chevrolet Camaro	13	Louis-Phillippe Montour		1
Chevrolet Camaro	13	(United States) Brad Gross	R	7
Chevrolet Camaro	20	(United States) Peter Klutt		1
Chevrolet Camaro	20	(United States) Michele Abbate		8–9
Chevrolet Camaro	22	(United States) Dylan Archer	R	3
Chevrolet Camaro	38	(United States) Edward Sevadjian	R	1, 4–6
Chevrolet Camaro	41	(United States) John Cloud	M	1, 5–7
Chevrolet Camaro	48	(United States) Scott Borchetta	R	2, 4–9
Chevrolet Camaro	57	(United States) Maurice Hull	M	All
Chevrolet Camaro	61	(United States) John Paul Southern Jr.	R	1–2, 5–9
Chevrolet Camaro	63	(United States) Bob Lima	M	1, 4–6, 8–9
Chevrolet Camaro	69	(United States) Mike Skinner	R	1
Chevrolet Camaro	77	(United States) Mike Skeen		1–4, 6
Chevrolet Camaro	83	(United States) John Paul Southern Jr.	R	1
Chevrolet Camaro	90	(United States) Dudley Fleck	R	4
Chevrolet Camaro	90	(United States) Chris Durbin	R	9
Chevrolet Camaro	92	(United States) Scott Lagasse Jr.		1–7
Chevrolet Camaro	96	(United States) Sam Mayer	R	4
Chevrolet Camaro	96	(United States) Connor Mosack	R	5–6, 8–9
Chevrolet Camaro	96	(United States) William Cox III	R	7
Chevrolet Camaro	98	(United States) Doug Winston		1, 4–7
Dodge Challenger	01	(United States) Rhett Barkau	R	4
Dodge Challenger	34	(United States) Jeff Wood	R	2–3
Dodge Challenger	71	(United States) Chris Durbin	R	8
Dodge Challenger	77	(United States) Matt Fassnacht	R	7
Ford Mustang	4	(United States) Tyler Kicera	R	4–6
Ford Mustang	8	(United States) Cameron Lawrence		2–9
Ford Mustang	9	(United States) Keith Prociuk (Note: Keith Prociuk practiced and qualified the #9 Ford Mustang at Circuit of the Americas, but handed the car over to Boris Said for the race.) (Note: Michael Self practiced and qualified the #9 Ford Mustang at Road Atlanta, but handed the car over to Keith Prociuk for the race.)		1, 4–9
Ford Mustang	9	(United States) Boris Said		7
Ford Mustang	9	(United States) Michael Self		8
Ford Mustang	12	(United States) Alex Wright		1–7
Ford Mustang	12	(United States) Drew Newbauer		8–9
Ford Mustang	14	(United States) Matt Parent		1
Ford Mustang	16	(United States) Jim Gallaugher		1–2, 4–6, 8–9
Ford Mustang	17	(United States) Mark Brummond	R	8–9
Ford Mustang	18	(United States) Scott Borchetta	R	3
Ford Mustang	18	(United States) Ty Gibbs	R	4
Ford Mustang	23	(United States) Curt Vogt	M	1–2, 5–9
Ford Mustang	24	(United States) Brad McAllister		4
Ford Mustang	26	(United States) Travis Cope	R	3
Ford Mustang	26	(United States) Riley Herbst	R	4
Ford Mustang	26	(United States) Ray Evernham	R	8–9
Ford Mustang	31	(United States) Elias Anderson		1, 4, 7
Ford Mustang	32	(United States) Barry Boes		1, 4–9
Ford Mustang	37	(United States) Edward Sevajian		2–3, 7–9
Ford Mustang	58	(United States) Cliff White	R	1, 4
Ford Mustang	58	(United States) Franklin Futrelle	R	8–9
Ford Mustang	60	(United States) Tim Gray	M	1, 3–4, 7–9
Ford Mustang	66	(United States) Jett Noland	R	2–9
Ford Mustang	75	(United States) Flinn Lazier	R	4
Ford Mustang	77	(United States) Mike Skeen		5, 7–9
Ford Mustang	81	(United States) Thomas Merrill		1–6, 8–9
Ford Mustang	87	(United States) Doug Peterson	M	1–2, 4–6, 8–9
Ford Mustang	87	(United States) Paul Tracy	R	7
Ford Mustang	97	(United States) Tom Sheehan		All
Ford Mustang	99	(United States) Jett Noland	R	1
Ford Mustang	99	Misha Goikhberg		2
Ford Mustang	99	(United States) Harrison Burton	R	4
Ford Mustang	99	(United States) Michael Self	R	7
XGT
Aston Martin Vantage GT3	27	Marc Montour	M/R	1
Audi R8 GT3 Ultra	5	(United States) Ken Thwaits	M	1–5, 7–9
Audi R8 GT3 Ultra	7	(United States) Jason Daskalos		7
Audi R8 LMS Ultra	15	(United States) Kevin Long	R	1, 3
Audi R8 LMS Ultra	15	(United States) Josh Hill	R	4
Chevrolet Corvette	11	(United States) Justin Oakes	R	7
Mercedes AMG GT3	80	(United States) Dan Knox	R	7
Porsche 911 GT3 R	10	(United States) Erich Joiner	R	1–2, 4–6
SGT
BMW E92 M3	00	(United States) Gabriele Jasper	M/R	1
BMW E92 M3	01	(United States) Rich White	R	1
BMW M4 GT4	24	(United States) Mark Brummond	R	2, 5–6, 8–9
Chevrolet Corvette	02	(United States) Larry Bailey	M	1, 3–7
Chevrolet Corvette	11	(United States) Justin Oakes	R	8–9
Chevrolet Corvette	26	(United States) Aaron Pierce		1, 3–9
Chevrolet Corvette	28	(United States) Lou Gigliotti	M	2, 4–9
Chevrolet Corvette	33	(United States) Joe Moholland		5–7
Chevrolet Corvette	96	(United States) Adrian Wlostowski		3
Dodge Viper	84	(United States) Lee Saunders		All
Ford Mustang	96	(United States) Adrian Wlostowski		1–2, 4–9
Ford Mustang GT4	41	(United States) James Pesek	R	1
Porsche 991 GT3 Cup	16	(United States) Tom Herb		1
Porsche 991 GT3 Cup	44	(United States) Tim Kezman		1
Porsche 991.1 GT3 Cup	6	(United States) Carey Grant		2, 4–6, 8–9
Porsche 991.1 GT3 Cup	46	(United States) Mark Boden		1
Porsche 991.1 GT3 Cup	55	(United States) Milton Grant	M	1–2, 4–9
GT
Aston Martin Vantage	22	(United States) Steve Davison		1, 5–6
BMW E90 M3	07	(United States) Michael Saia	R	2
BMW E92 M3	00	(United States) Miguelangel Aponte-Rios	R	2
BMW E92 M3	03	(United States) Gabriele Jasper	R	2
Ford Mustang	14	(United States) Billy Griffin	R	1, 5–9
Ford Mustang	37	(United States) Dan Schlickenmeyer	M/R	8–9
Ford Mustang	86	(United States) John Baucom		8–9
Porsche GT4 Clubsport	45	(United States) Tim Horrell	R	1–2, 4–7
Entry Lists:

Icon	Class
R	Rookie
M	Master
	Northern Cup
	Southern Cup

=== West Coast Championship ===
TA
Car	No.	Driver	Class	Rounds
Chevrolet Camaro	66	(United States) Michael Fine		1
Chevrolet Corvette	13	(United States) Steve Goldman	R	2
Chevrolet Corvette	72	(United States) Michelle Nagai		1, 3
Ford Mustang	6	(United States) Greg Pickett	M	All
TA2
Chevrolet Camaro	04	(United States) CJ Cramm	R	4
Chevrolet Camaro	19	(United States) Matthew Butson		1–2
Chevrolet Camaro	25	(United States) Tom Klauer	R	1–3
Chevrolet Camaro	30	(United States) Michelle Abbate		All
Chevrolet Camaro	33	(United States) Nick Roseno	R	1–3
Chevrolet Camaro	49	(United States) Ethan Wilson		1
Chevrolet Camaro	76	(United States) Anthony Honeywell		1
Chevrolet Camaro	88	(United States) Cameron Parsons	R	1–3
Dodge Challenger	47	(United States) Corey Weber	R	2
Ford Mustang	16	(United States) Jim Gallaugher		4
Ford Mustang	17	(United States) Tim Lynn		1–3
Ford Mustang	29	(United States) Mitch Marvosh	M	1–3
Ford Mustang	34	(United States) Jim Gallaugher		1–3
Ford Mustang	49	(United States) Mitch Marvosh	M	4
Ford Mustang	62	(United States) Thomas Merrill		3
Ford Mustang	63	(United States) Rudy Revak	M/R	2–4
XGT
Mercedes-AMG GT3	59	(United States) Simon Gregg		1–2
SGT
Chevrolet Holden	00	(United States) John Schweitzer	R	3
Audi R8 GT4	04	(United States) Natalie Decker	R	1–2, 4
Factory Five GTM	4	(United States) Carl Rydquist		1–3
GT
Aston Martin Vantage GT4	74	(United States) Sean Young		4
Ford Mustang	7	(United States) Beau Borders		1–2
Chevrolet Camaro	65	(United States) Joe Bogetich	M	All
Entry Lists:

Icon	Class
R	Rookie
M	Master

== Race schedule and results ==
=== National Championship ===
A 12 round preliminary schedule was released on October 16, 2019 ahead of the final round of the season. Brainerd Raceway returned to the schedule and Daytona International Speedway was dropped due to scheduling conflicts. On March 17, 2020, the Road Atlanta round was forced to be postponed due to the COVID-19 pandemic. This was the start of a series of postponements and cancellations that lead to a revised schedule being announced on April 7, 2020. In this schedule, the Detroit round was dropped reducing the series to an 11 round championship. Unfortunately the planned restart of the series at Indianapolis Motor Speedway was also postponed and eventually canceled with the series resuming at Mid-Ohio Sports Car Course instead. The rounds at Watkins Glen and Lime Rock Park were the final casualties of the outbreak with late cancellations leading to double headers at Virginia International Raceway and Road Atlanta.

Races	Circuit	Date	TA Winning driver	TA2 Winning driver	XGT Winning driver	SGT Winning driver	GT Winning driver	Supporting
1	Sebring International Raceway	February 29–March 1	(United States) Ernie Francis Jr.	(United States) Mike Skeen	(United States) Erich Joiner	(United States) Lee Saunders	(United States) Steven Davison	SVRA
2	Mid-Ohio Sports Car Course	June 26–28	(United States) Ernie Francis Jr.	(United States) Thomas Merrill	(United States) Erich Joiner	(United States) Mark Brummond	(United States) Tim Horrell	SVRA
3	Brainerd International Raceway	July 10–12	(United States) Tomy Drissi	(United States) Mike Skeen	(United States) Ken Thwaits	(United States) Lee Saunders	None entered	SCCA
4	Road America	August 6–8	(United States) Chris Dyson	(United States) Mike Skeen	(United States) Ken Thwaits	(United States) Lee Saunders	(United States) Tim Horrell	NASCAR Xfinity Series
5	Virginia International Raceway	September 25–27	(United States) Ernie Francis Jr.	(United States) Tyler Kicera	(United States) Ken Thwaits	(United States) Lee Saunders	(United States) Billy Griffin	SVRA
6	Virginia International Raceway	September 25–27	(United States) Ernie Francis Jr.	(United States) Mike Skeen	(United States) Erich Joiner	(United States) Adrian Wlostowski	(United States) Steven Davison	SVRA
7	Circuit of the Americas†	November 6–8	(United States) Boris Said	(United States) Rafa Matos	(United States) Jason Daskalos	(United States) Lou Gigliotti	(United States) Billy Griffin	SVRA
8	Michelin Raceway Road Atlanta	November 19–22	(Austria) Martin Ragginger	(United States) Mike Skeen	(United States) Ken Thwaits	(United States) Justin Oakes	(United States) Billy Griffin	SVRA
9	Michelin Raceway Road Atlanta	November 19–22	(United States) Chris Dyson	(United States) Mike Skeen	None started	(United States) Mark Brummond	(United States) Billy Griffin	SVRA

Races are part of the Northern Cup
Races are part of the Southern Cup

† Race is held in combination with the Trans Am West Coast Championship

=== West Coast Championship ===
A six round provisional schedule was released on October 31, 2019 ahead of the final round of the 2019 Trans-Am Championship. Sonoma Raceway gained a second date with the first kicking off the series and the second being moved to August. This was done at the expensive of the Auto Club Speedway roval which lost its place on the calendar. The final round at Circuit of the Americas was also moved to November. Due to the COVID-19 pandemic, however, the schedule was forced to change. Under the new calendar, the series started at Thunderhill Raceway Park and concluded with a double-header at Weathertech Raceway Laguna Seca.

Races	Circuit	Date	TA Winning driver	TA2 Winning driver	XGT Winning driver	SGT Winning driver	GT Winning driver	Supporting
1	Thunderhill Raceway Park	August 1–2	(United States) Greg Pickett	(United States) Ethan Wilson	(United States) Simon Gregg	(United States) Carl Rydquist	(United States) Joe Bogetich	NASA
2	Sonoma Raceway	August 21–23	(United States) Greg Pickett	(United States) Matthew Butson	(United States) Simon Gregg	(United States) Carl Rydquist	(United States) Joe Bogetich	NASA
3	Sonoma Raceway	October 9–11	(United States) Greg Pickett	(United States) Thomas Merrill	None entered	(United States) Carl Rydquist	None started	NASA
4	Sonoma Raceway	October 9–11	(United States) Greg Pickett	(United States) Thomas Merrill	None entered	(United States) Carl Rydquist	None started	NASA
5	Circuit of the Americas†	November 6–8	(United States) Greg Pickett	(United States) Jim Gallaugher (Note: Michele Abbate crossed the finish line first, but was later penalized for passing under a double yellow flag.)	None entered	(United States) Natalie Decker	(United States) Sean Young	SVRA

† Race is held in combination with the Trans Am National Championship

== Championship Standings ==
=== Points System ===
Race Position	**1**	**2**	**3**	**4**	**5**	**6**	**7**	**8**	**9**	**10**	**11**	**12**	**13**	**14**	**15**	**16**	**17**	**18**	**19**	**20**	**21**	**22**	**23**	**24**	**25+**
Points	30	27	25	23	21	20	19	18	17	16	15	14	13	12	11	10	9	8	7	6	5	4	3	2	1

Qualifying Position	**1st**	**2nd**	**3rd**	LL	LML	R	M
Points	3	2	1	**1**	**1***	Rookie	Master

Drivers may choose to declare for Northern or Southern Cup points, but these drivers may not run the full national season. Each Cup consists of the points from only some of the rounds.

Awards are also given to the highest ranked Master and Rookie drivers in each class. The Master classification is given to drivers over 60 years old while the Rookie classification is for drivers competing in their first full year. Some drivers may be eligible for both.

=== National Championship ===
==== TA ====
Pos.	Driver	Class	Car	**SEB**	**OHI**	**BRA**	**RDA**	**VIR1**	**VIR2**	**COT**	**ATL1**	**ATL2**	Points	NC	SC
1	(United States) Ernie Francis Jr.		Ford Mustang	**1^{1*}**	**1**	**6^{1}**	2^{3}	**1^{2}**	**1^{1*}**	2^{2}	11	4	253		
2	(United States) Tomy Drissi		Chevrolet Camaro	2	4^{2}	**1^{2*}**	6^{2}	7	6^{2}	4	2	3^{3}	225		
3	(United States) Chris Dyson		Ford Mustang	12	3	7	**1^{1*}**	3^{3}	2^{3}	9^{3}	**10^{2}**	1^{1}	202		
4	(United States) Amy Ruman		Chevrolet Corvette	3^{2}	7	2^{3}	10	4	3	5	5	7	191		
5	(United States) Simon Gregg		Chevrolet Corvette/ Chevrolet Camaro	5	6^{3}	3	4	6	4	6	7	8	190		
6	(United States) Kerry Hitt	**M**	Cadillac CTS-V	7	8	5	8	11	8	7	8	DNS	146		
7	(United States) Richard Grant	**M**	Chevrolet Corvette	8	DNS		7	9	5	8	9	9	127		
8	(United States) Boris Said		Dodge Challenger					**2^{1*}**		**1^{1*}**	3^{3}	5	114		
9	(United Kingdom) Humaid al Masaood	**R**	Ford Mustang	4	11	4	WD	12	9	WD			92		
10	(United States) John Baucom		Ford Mustang	11	9			5	11				68		**51**
11	(Austria) Martin Ragginger	**R**	Chevrolet Camaro								**1^{1*}**	2^{2}	64		
12	(United States) Jeff Hinkle		Dodge Challenger		12			13			6	9	55		**41**
13	(United States) Matthew Butson		Chevrolet Corvette				9	10	10				49		
14	(United States) Justin Marks	**R**	Chevrolet Camaro								4	6	43		
15	(United States) Tony Ave		Chevrolet Corvette		**2^{1*}**								32		
16	(United States) Cliff Ebben	**M**	Ford Mustang				3						25	**25**	
17	(United States) Greg Pickett	**M**	Ford Mustang							3			25		
18	(United States) Doug Peterson	**M**	Chevrolet Camaro		5								21		
19	(United States) Denny Lamers	**M**	Ford Mustang				5						21	**21**	
20	(United States) Jon Leavy	**M**	Chevrolet Camaro	6									20		**20**
21	(United States) Paul Menard		Dodge Challenger						7				19		
22	(United States) Ryan McManus		Chevrolet Corvette					8					18		18
23	(United States) Adam Andretti		Dodge Challenger	9^{3}									18	0	
24	(United States) Daniel Urrutia Jr.		Chevrolet Corvette	10									16		16
25	(United States) David Pintaric		Ford Mustang		10								16		
Pos.	Driver	Class	Car	**SEB**	**OHI**	**BRA**	**RDA**	**VIR1**	**VIR2**	**COT**	**ATL1**	**ATL2**	Points	NC	SC

Colour	Result
Gold	Winner
Silver	Second place
Bronze	Third place
Green	Points classification
Blue	Non-points classification
Blue	Non-classified finish (NC)
Purple	Retired, not classified (Ret)
Red	Did not qualify (DNQ)
Red	Did not pre-qualify (DNPQ)
Black	Disqualified (DSQ)
White	Did not start (DNS)
White	Withdrew (WD)
White	Race cancelled (C)
Blank	Did not practice (DNP)
Blank	Did not arrive (DNA)
Blank	Excluded (EX)

^{1, 2, 3} - Qualifying position (only shown for points positions)
**Bold** - Lead a lap
* - Lead most laps
Italics - Fastest lap

==== TA2 ====
Pos.	Driver	Class	Car	**SEB**	**OHI**	**BRA**	**RDA**	**VIR1**	**VIR2**	**COT**	**ATL1**	**ATL2**	Points	NC	SC
1	(United States) Mike Skeen		Chevrolet Camaro/ Ford Mustang	**1^{1}**	3^{2}	**1^{1*}**	**1^{3*}**	6^{1}	**1**	3^{1}	**1^{1*}**	**1^{1*}**	281		
2	(United States) Rafa Matos		Chevrolet Camaro	3	**13^{1}**	3	3^{2}	**2^{2}**	19	**1^{3*}**	3^{2}	10	207		
3	(United States) Cameron Lawrence		Chevrolet Camaro/ Ford Mustang	2^{2}	15	5	25^{1}	3^{3}	3^{3}	**2^{2}**	2	**2^{2}**	204		
4	(United States) Thomas Merrill		Ford Mustang	**14^{3*}**	**1^{3*}**	**2^{2}**	6	4	9^{2}		4	17^{3}	173		
5	(United States) Jett Noland	**R**	Ford Mustang	9^{3}	6	6	22	10	16	11	12	3	141		
6	(United States) Scott Borchetta	**R**	Chevrolet Camaro/ Ford Mustang		9	9	21	11	8	10	9	11	120		
7	(United States) Keith Prociuk		Ford Mustang	12			7	9	4	WD	6	4	116		
8	(United States) Barry Boes		Ford Mustang	11			11	15	6	7	10	6	116		
9	(United States) Tom Sheehan		Ford Mustang	23	7	11	15	19	7	22	11	8	111		
10	(United States) Scott Lagasse Jr.		Chevrolet Camaro	27	2	**4^{3}**	9	20	18	4			107		
11	(United States) Doug Peterson	**M**	Ford Mustang	6	18		26	7	5		8	7	106		
12	(United States) Maurice Hull	**M**	Chevrolet Camaro	24	14	14	13	14	10	13	18	9	106		**69**
13	(United States) John Paul Southern Jr.	**R**	Chevrolet Camaro	13	4			21		5	7	5	102		**79**
14	(United States) Tyler Kicera	**R**	Ford Mustang				4	**1^{*}**	**2^{1*}**				87		
15	(United States) Edward Sevadjian	**R**	Chevrolet Camaro/ Ford Mustang	7	16	15	DNS	8	17	17	22	23	83		
16	(United States) Jim Gallaugher		Ford Mustang	19	12		23	13	11		17	19	70		
17	(United States) Alex Wright		Ford Mustang	DNS	10	12	24	18	12	12			68	**32**	
18	(United States) Curt Vogt	**M**	Ford Mustang	17	11			12		19	16	DNS	57		
19	Misha Goikhberg		Chevrolet Camaro/ Ford Mustang	4	5						14	22	56		
20	(United States) Bob Lima	**M**	Chevrolet Camaro	18			12	16			21	14	49		
21	(United States) Elias Anderson		Ford Mustang	5			8			21			44		
22	(United States) Connor Mosack	**R**	Chevrolet Camaro					5	14		20	21	44		
23	(United States) John Atwell		Chevrolet Camaro	10						6			36		**36**
24	(United States) Jeff Wood	**R**	Dodge Challenger		8	10							34		
25	(United States) John Cloud	**M**	Chevrolet Camaro	28				17	13	15			34		
26	(United States) Franklin Futrelle	**R**	Ford Mustang								5^{3}	15	33		
27	(United States) Tim Gray	**M**	Ford Mustang	20		13	16				23	DNS	32	**23**	
28	(United States) Doug Winston	**R**	Chevrolet Camaro	22			17	DNS	15	18			32		
29	(United States) Sam Mayer	**R**	Chevrolet Camaro				2						27		
30	(United States) Michelle Abbate		Chevrolet Camaro								15	12	27		
31	(United States) Aaron Pierce		Chevrolet Camaro	25	17						13	20	26		
32	(United States) Brad McAllister		Ford Mustang				5						21		
33	(United States) Drew Newbauer		Ford Mustang								19	13	20		
34	(United States) Travis Cope	**R**	Ford Mustang			7							19		
35	(United States) Matt Fassnacht	**R**	Dodge Challenger							8			18		
36	(United States) Dylan Archer	**R**	Chevrolet Camaro			8							18		
37	(United States) Peter Klutt		Chevrolet Camaro	8									18		
38	(United States) Boris Said		Ford Mustang							9			17		
39	(United States) Harrison Burton	**R**	Ford Mustang				10						16		
40	(United States) Rhett Barkau	**R**	Dodge Challenger				14						12		
41	(United States) Brad Gross	**R**	Chevrolet Camaro							14			12		
42	(United States) Cliff White	**R**	Ford Mustang	15									11		
43	(United States) Ray Evernham	**R**	Ford Mustang								26	16	11		
44	Louis-Phillippe Montour		Chevrolet Camaro	16									10		10
45	(United States) William Cox III	**R**	Chevrolet Camaro							16			10		
46	(United States) Chris Durbin	**R**	Dodge Challenger/ Chevrolet Camaro								24	18	10		
47	(United States) Flinn Lazier	**R**	Ford Mustang				18						8		
48	(United States) Ty Gibbs	**R**	Ford Mustang				19						7		
49	(United States) Michael Self	**R**	Ford Mustang							20	DNS		6		
50	(United States) Dudley Fleck	**R**	Chevrolet Camaro				20						6		
51	(United States) Matt Parent		Ford Mustang	21									5		
52	(United States) Mark Brummond	**R**	Ford Mustang								25	DNS	1		
53	(United States) Mike Skinner	**R**	Chevrolet Camaro	26									1		
54	(United States) Riley Herbst	**R**	Ford Mustang				DNS						0		
55	(United States) Paul Tracy	**R**	Ford Mustang							DSQ			0		
Pos.	Driver	Class	Car	**SEB**	**OHI**	**BRA**	**RDA**	**VIR1**	**VIR2**	**COT**	**ATL1**	**ATL2**	Points	NC	SC

==== XGT ====
Pos.	Driver	Class	Car	**SEB**	**OHI**	**BRA**	**RDA**	**VIR1**	**VIR2**	**COT**	**ATL1**	**ATL2**	Points	NC	SC
1	(United States) Ken Thwaits	**M**	Audi R8 GT3 Ultra	3^{2}	**2^{1}**	**1^{1*}**	**1^{2*}**	**1^{1*}**	2^{2}	2	**1^{1*}**	DNS	253		
2	(United States) Erich Joiner	**R**	Porsche 911 GT3 R	**1^{1*}**	**1^{2*}**		**2^{1}**	**2**	**1^{1*}**				150		
3	(United States) Jason Daskalos		Audi R8 GT3 Ultra							**1^{2}**			33		
4	(United States) Kevin Long	**R**	Audi R8 LMS Ultra	DNS		2^{2}							29		
5	(United States) Dan Knox	**R**	Mercedes AMG GT3							**4^{1*}**			28		
6	Marc Montour	**M**/**R**	Aston Martin Vantage GT3	2^{3}									28		**28**
7	(United States) Justin Oakes	**R**	Chevrolet Corvette							3^{3}			26		
8	(United States) Josh Hill	**R**	Audi R8 LMS Ultra				3^{3}						24		
Pos.	Driver	Class	Car	**SEB**	**OHI**	**BRA**	**RDA**	**VIR1**	**VIR2**	**COT**	**ATL1**	**ATL2**	Points	NC	SC

==== SGT ====
Pos.	Driver	Class	Car	**SEB**	**OHI**	**BRA**	**RDA**	**VIR1**	**VIR2**	**COT**	**ATL1**	**ATL2**	Points	NC	SC
1	(United States) Lee Saunders		Dodge Viper	**1^{2*}**	3^{2}	**1^{1*}**	**1^{1*}**	**1^{1*}**	**6^{1}**	6	3^{2}	3	252		
2	(United States) Adrian Wlostowski		Ford Mustang/ Chevrolet Corvette	3	2^{3}	2	5^{3}	2^{3}	**1^{2*}**	**2^{1}**	5^{3}	2^{3}	245		
3	(United States) Milton Grant	**M**	Porsche 991.1 GT3 Cup	WD	6		3	5	3	3	7	5	156		
4	(United States) Mark Brummond	**R**	BMW M4 GT4		**1^{1*}**			3^{2}	2		4	**1^{*}**	143		
5	(United States) Carey Grant		Porsche 991.1 GT3 Cup		4		2	4	4		6	4	139		
6	(United States) Lou Gigliotti	**M**	Chevrolet Corvette		5		6^{2}	7	5^{3}	**1^{2*}**	2	DSQ	126		
7	(United States) Aaron Pierce		Chevrolet Corvette	9		3^{2}	7	9	7	5^{3}	8	DNS	94	**37**	
8	(United States) Larry Bailey	**M**	Chevrolet Corvette	5		DNS	4	8	8				62	**23**	
9	(United States) Justin Oakes		Chevrolet Corvette								**1^{1*}**	**6^{1}**	60		
10	(United States) Joe Moholland		Chevrolet Corvette					6		4			43		**43**
11	(United States) Mark Boden		Porsche 991.1 GT3 Cup	2^{3}									28		
12	(United States) Tom Herb		Porsche 991 GT3 Cup	4									23		
13	(United States) Tim Kezman		Porsche 991 GT3 Cup	7^{1}									23		
14	(United States) James Pesek	**R**	Ford Mustang GT4	6									20		
15	(United States) Rich White	**R**	BMW E92 M3	8									18	0	
16	(United States) Gabriele Jasper	**M**/**R**	BMW E92 M3	DNS									0	0	
Pos.	Driver	Class	Car	**SEB**	**OHI**	**BRA**	**RDA**	**VIR1**	**VIR2**	**COT**	**ATL1**	**ATL2**	Points	NC	SC

==== GT ====
Pos.	Driver	Class	Car	**SEB**	**OHI**	**BRA**	**RDA**	**VIR1**	**VIR2**	**COT**	**ATL1**	**ATL2**	Points	NC	SC
1	(United States) Billy Griffin	**R**	Ford Mustang	2^{3}				**1^{2}**	**2^{2*}**	**1^{1*}**	**1^{1*}**	**1^{1*}**	197		
2	(United States) Tim Horrell	**R**	Porsche GT4 Clubsport	**3^{1}**	**1^{1*}**		**1^{1*}**	**3^{1*}**	DNS	2^{2}			145		
3	(United States) Steve Davison		Aston Martin Vantage	**1^{2*}**				2^{3}	**1^{1}**				96		
4	(United States) John Baucom		Ford Mustang								3^{2}	2^{2}	56		
5	(United States) Miguelangel Aponte-Rios	**R**	BMW E92 M3		2^{2}								29	**29**	
6	(United States) Dan Schlickenmeyer	**M**/**R**	Ford Mustang								2^{3}	DNS	28		
7	(United States) Gabriele Jasper	**R**	BMW E92 M3		3^{3}								26	**26**	
8	(United States) Michael Saia	**R**	BMW E90 M3		4								23	**23**	
Pos.	Driver	Class	Car	**SEB**	**OHI**	**BRA**	**RDA**	**VIR1**	**VIR2**	**COT**	**ATL1**	**ATL2**	Points	NC	SC

=== West Coast Championship ===
==== TA ====
Pos.	Driver	Class	Car	THU	SON1	SON2	SON3	COT	Points
1	(United States) Greg Pickett	**M**	Ford Mustang	**1^{1*}**	**1^{1*}**	**1^{1*}**	**1^{1*}**	**1^{1*}**	175
2	(United States) Michelle Nagai		Chevrolet Corvette	DNS		**2^{2}**	2^{2}		59
3	(United States) Steve Goldman	**R**	Chevrolet Corvette		2^{2}				16
4	(United States) Michael Fine		Chevrolet Camaro	DNS					0
Pos.	Driver	Class	Car	THU	SON1	SON2	SON3	COT	Points

==== TA2 ====
Pos.	Driver	Class	Car	THU	SON1	SON2	SON3	COT	Points
1	(United States) Jim Gallaugher		Ford Mustang	6	7	**2**	4	1^{2}	122
2	(United States) Michelle Abbate		Chevrolet Camaro	4	5	**3**	5	**2^{3}**	119
3	(United States) Tim Lynn		Ford Mustang	2^{2}	11^{2}	4^{3}	2^{2}		99
4	(United States) Mitch Marvosh	**M**	Ford Mustang	5	4	6	9	3	98
5	(United States) Rudy Revak	**M**/**R**	Ford Mustang		3	5	8	4	87
6	(United States) Cameron Parsons	**R**	Chevrolet Camaro	8	8	7	6		75
7	(United States) Thomas Merrill		Ford Mustang			**1^{1*}**	**1^{1*}**		70
8	(United States) Tom Klauer	**R**	Chevrolet Camaro	3	9	**8**	7		70
9	(United States) Nick Roseno	**R**	Chevrolet Camaro	DNS	2	9^{2}	3^{3}		64
10	(United States) Matthew Butson		Chevrolet Camaro	7^{3}	**1^{1*}**				55
11	(United States) Ethan Wilson		Chevrolet Camaro	**1^{1*}**					35
12	(United States) Anthony Honeywell		Chevrolet Camaro	9	6^{3}				30
13	(United States) CJ Cramm	**R**	Chevrolet Camaro					5^{1}	26
14	(United States) Corey Weber	**R**	Dodge Challenger		10				16
Pos.	Driver	Class	Car	THU	SON1	SON2	SON3	COT	Points

==== XGT ====
Pos.	Driver	Class	Car	THU	SON1	SON2	SON3	COT	Points
1	(United States) Simon Gregg		Mercedes-AMG GT3	**1^{1*}**	**1^{1*}**				70
Pos.	Driver	Class	Car	THU	SON1	SON2	SON3	COT	Points

==== SGT ====
Pos.	Driver	Class	Car	THU	SON1	SON2	SON3	COT	Points
1	(United States) Carl Rydquist		Factory Five GTM	**1^{1*}**	**1^{1*}**	**1^{2*}**	**1^{1*}**		137
2	(United States) Natalie Decker	**R**	Audi R8 GT4	2^{2}	2^{2}			**1^{1*}**	93
3	(United States) John Schweitzer	**R**	Chevrolet Holden			2^{1}	2^{2}		59
Pos.	Driver	Class	Car	THU	SON1	SON2	SON3	COT	Points

==== GT ====
Pos.	Driver	Class	Car	THU	SON1	SON2	SON3	COT	Points
1	(United States) Joe Bogetich	**M**	Chevrolet Camaro	**1^{2*}**	**1***	WD	WD	2^{2}	95
2	(United States) Beau Borders		Ford Mustang	**2^{1}**	2^{1}				61
3	(United States) Sean Young		Aston Martin Vantage GT4					**1^{1*}**	35
Pos.	Driver	Class	Car	THU	SON1	SON2	SON3	COT	Points
