= Claudio Burtin =

American entrepreneur

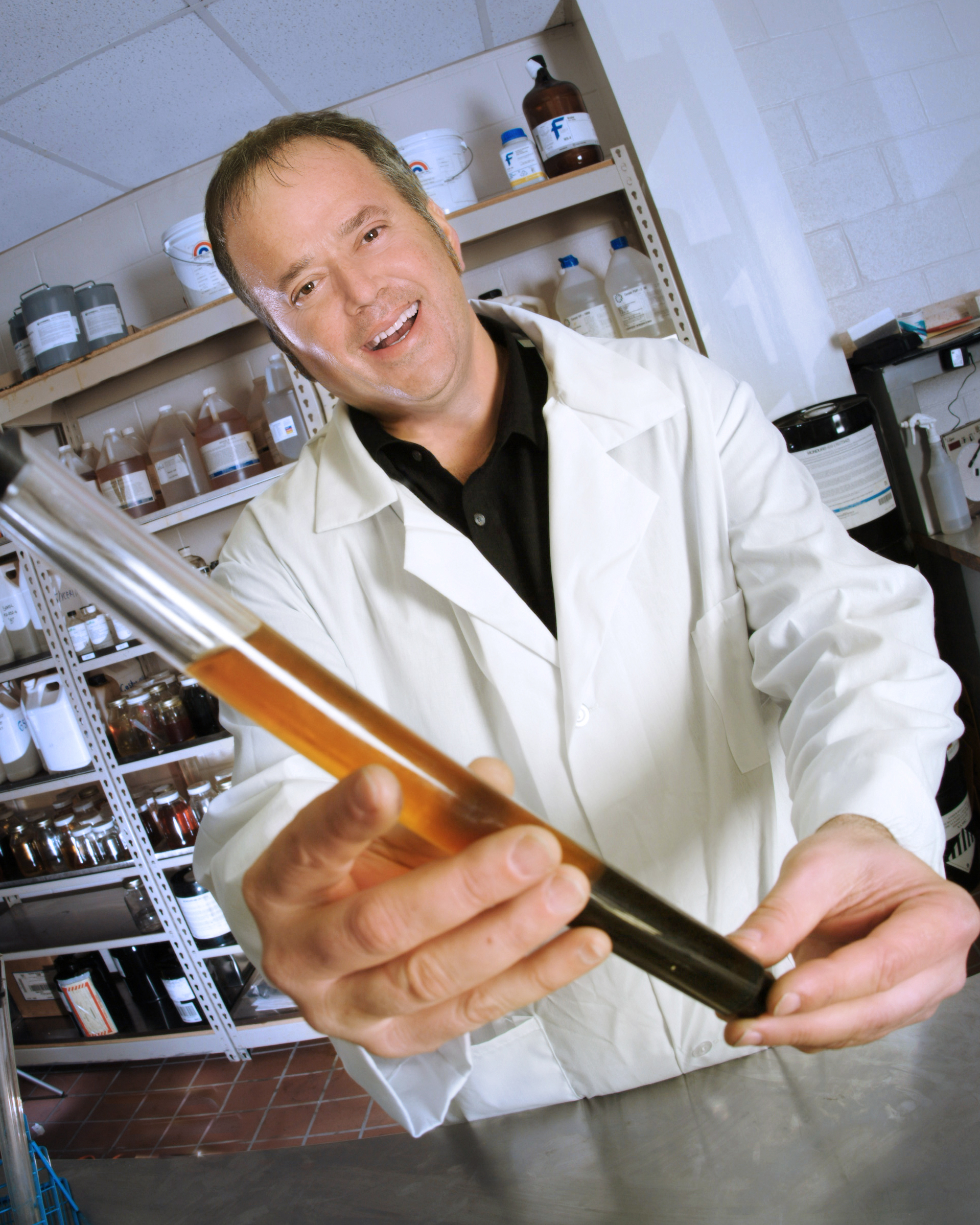
- Nationality: Argentine; American
- Born: September 17, 1962 (age 64)

Trans-Am Series career
- Debut season: 1993
- Current team: Burtin Racing
- Best finish: 3rd in 2016

Claudio Burtin (born 17 September 1962 in Rosario, Argentina) is an American entrepreneur, chemist, and race car driver. He is the founder of LINE-X truck bed liners and is credited with the original formulations trademarking LINE-X. Born in Argentina, Burtin moved to the U.S. in the summer of 1963. He attended Our Lady of the Valley Catholic elementary school in the Los Angeles school district in southern California. He began working for his father at Chemetics Systems Inc. in Compton, CA at the age of fifteen while attending Servite High School in Anaheim. He apprenticed in polyurethane chemistry under his father, Carlos Burtin, a licensed chemist.

Burtin emigrated to the United States with his wife Ana Maria, older brother J.B., and Claudio. Together, they founded the Burtin Corporation in 1982 in Santa Ana, California. The company developed and refined various types of polyurethanes. In 1994, Burtin became president of LINE-X, one of Burtin Corporation's divisions, where he also served as Chief Technical Officer until 2005.

Early in his career, Burtin was selected as a specialist to design and write the insulation specification requirements for the Trident 3 series of nuclear missiles. Burtin later developed LINE-X protective coatings and PAXCON. The first LINE-X truck was sprayed by Burtin in 1987.

PAXCON is one of the first "blast mitigation" products tested and approved by the U.S. Military for use on military installations. PAXCON was used to coat U.S. government facilities, including the Pentagon after the 9/11 attacks. Burtin holds three patents. After selling LINE-X to Graham Partners, Burtin founded Burtin Polymer Laboratories.

In addition to product development, Burtin also launched FOAMETIX, a light-density polyurethane foam designed for insulation. Burtin has developed and trademarked a wide array of other polyurethane products and applications available for both residential and commercial use today.

== Motorsports ==
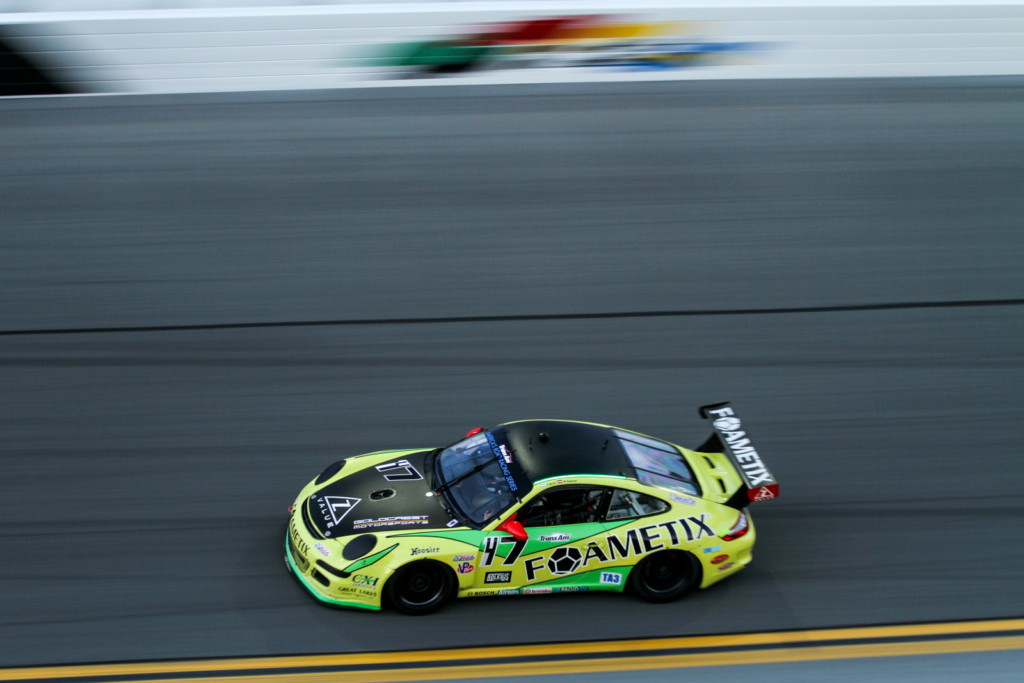
Porsche 997 GT3

Burtin is the team owner and driver of Burtin Racing, with deep roots in motorsports that started at a young age. Founded by Burtin, Burtin Racing is based in Adairsville, Georgia, and is primarily focused on road racing in North America. Burtin has competed in numerous road races, including driving a Porsche 997 GT3 in North American endurance racing events and the Trans Am Championship Series.

As both team principal and racing driver, Burtin has been involved in sports car competition since 1982. In 1998, he became the SCCA South East GT Champion. Burtin has also driven for the Woodhouse Racing Viper team in the SCCA Pro Racing World Challenge GT. His most recent win was in the 2020 Hoosier SCCA Super Tour GT1 Class at Sebring, FL, where he drove one of his Burtin Racing Camaros.

Burtin made his debut in the Trans-Am Series at the Grand Prix of Long Beach. Driving a Ford Mustang entered by Mirage Motorsports, he experienced gearbox problems and did not finish the race. He competed in two more races that season. In 1994, Burtin participated only in the Trans-Am race supporting the Grand Prix of Miami. Throughout the decade, Burtin continued to make sporadic appearances in the Trans-Am Series. In 2000, he achieved a career-best fourth place on the streets of Long Beach, a feat he repeated the following year. For the 2002 Trans-Am season, Burtin switched from a Ford Mustang to a Panoz Esperante, before returning to the Ford Mustang the following season.

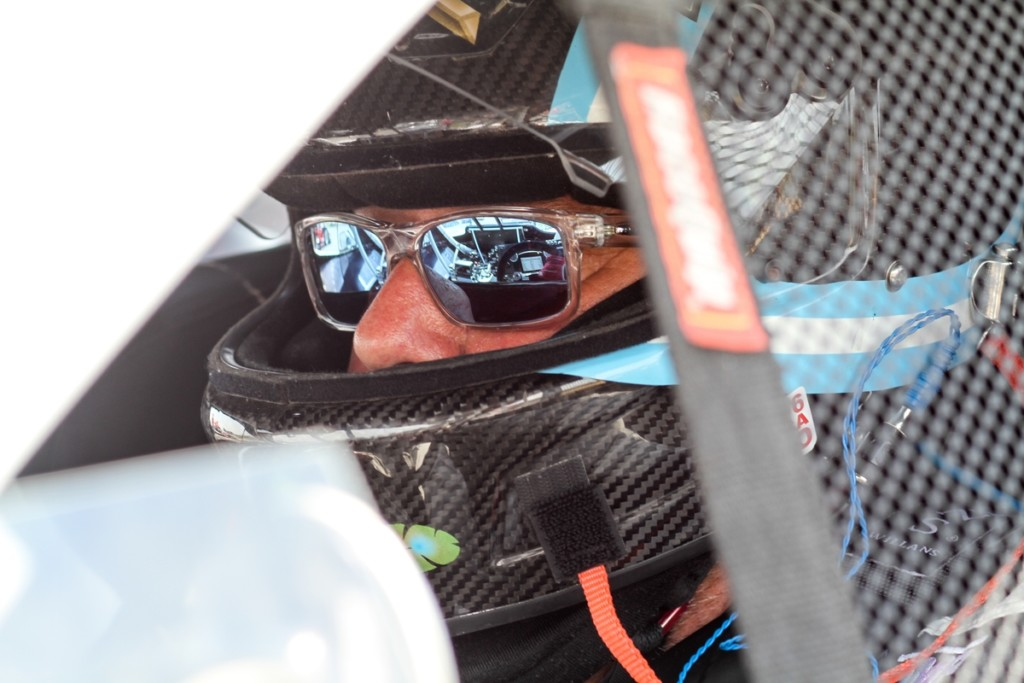
Claudio Burtin

Burtin Racing was sponsored by LINE-X Protective Coatings until 2005. Afterward, Burtin joined the growing SCCA World Challenge for the 2006 season, driving a Chevrolet Corvette C6. Since 2006, Burtin Racing has been sponsored by FOAMETIX throughout its racing endeavors.

In conjunction with Goldcrest Motorsports, Burtin Racing has competed in seven consecutive Daytona 24-Hour events. In the 2008 24 Hours of Daytona, Burtin started his season in the 24 Hours of Daytona with The Racer's Group. In the 2010 24 Hours of Daytona, he finished nineteenth overall with Alex Job Racing. Throughout these 24 Hours of Daytona races, Burtin teamed up with Martin Ragginger, who assisted the team with engineering, data analysis, and driver coaching.

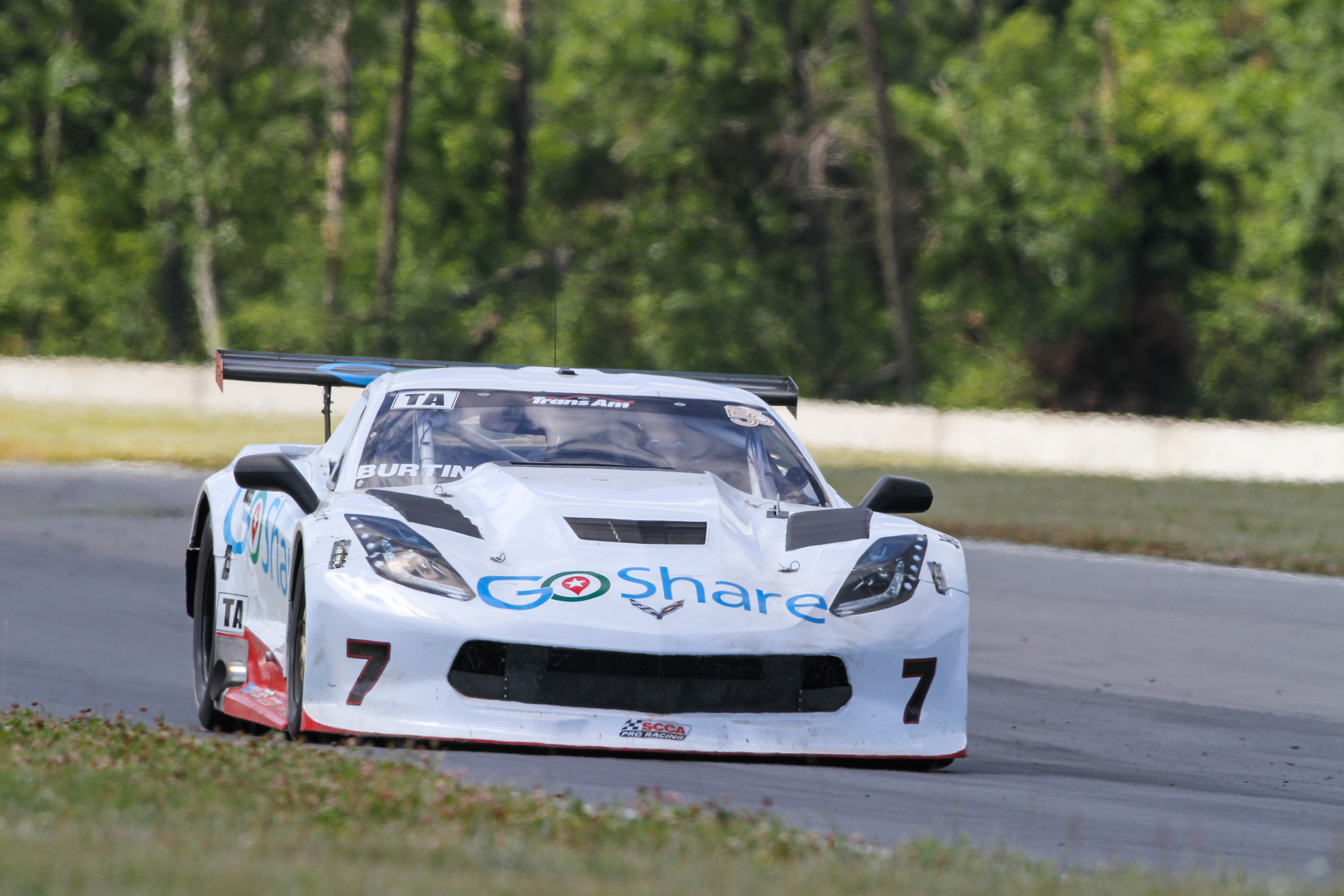
GoShare Corvette C7.R

In 2015, the Burtin Racing/Bullet Liner team competed in the SCCA TA Trans Am Championship Series with a newly developed Chevrolet Corvette CR.7. Burtin partnered with GoShare, an on-demand local delivery service, for the remainder of the 2016 season.

At the end of the 2020 season, Burtin Racing acquired a 73,000-square-foot facility.

== Motorsports Results ==
=== SCCA National Championship Runoffs ===
Year	Track	Car	Engine	Class	Finish	Start	Status
1998	Mid-Ohio	Ford Mustang	Ford	GT1	DSQ	7	Disqualified

=== American Open-Wheel Racing Results ===
(key) (Races in bold indicate pole position, races in italics indicate fastest race lap)

=== USAC FF2000 Championship Results ===
Year	Entrant	1	2	3	4	5	6	7	8	9	Pos	Points
1990		WSR1	MMR	WSR2	CAJ	WSR3	SON1; 11	FIR	SON2; 7	PIR	???	???
1991		TOP1	SON; 15	MMR1	TOP2	LS1; 8	MMR2	WSR; 14	LS3	LS3	???	???

== Driver History with Burtin Racing ==
- Jack Baldwin
- Martin Ragginger
- Mario Farnbacher
- Robert Renauer
- Nick Tandy
- Bryan Sellers
- Sebastian Asch
- Scott Tucker
- Mac McGehee
- Mitch Pagerey
- Hoosier SCCA Super Tour Race 2 Results
