= Adam Andretti =

American racing driver

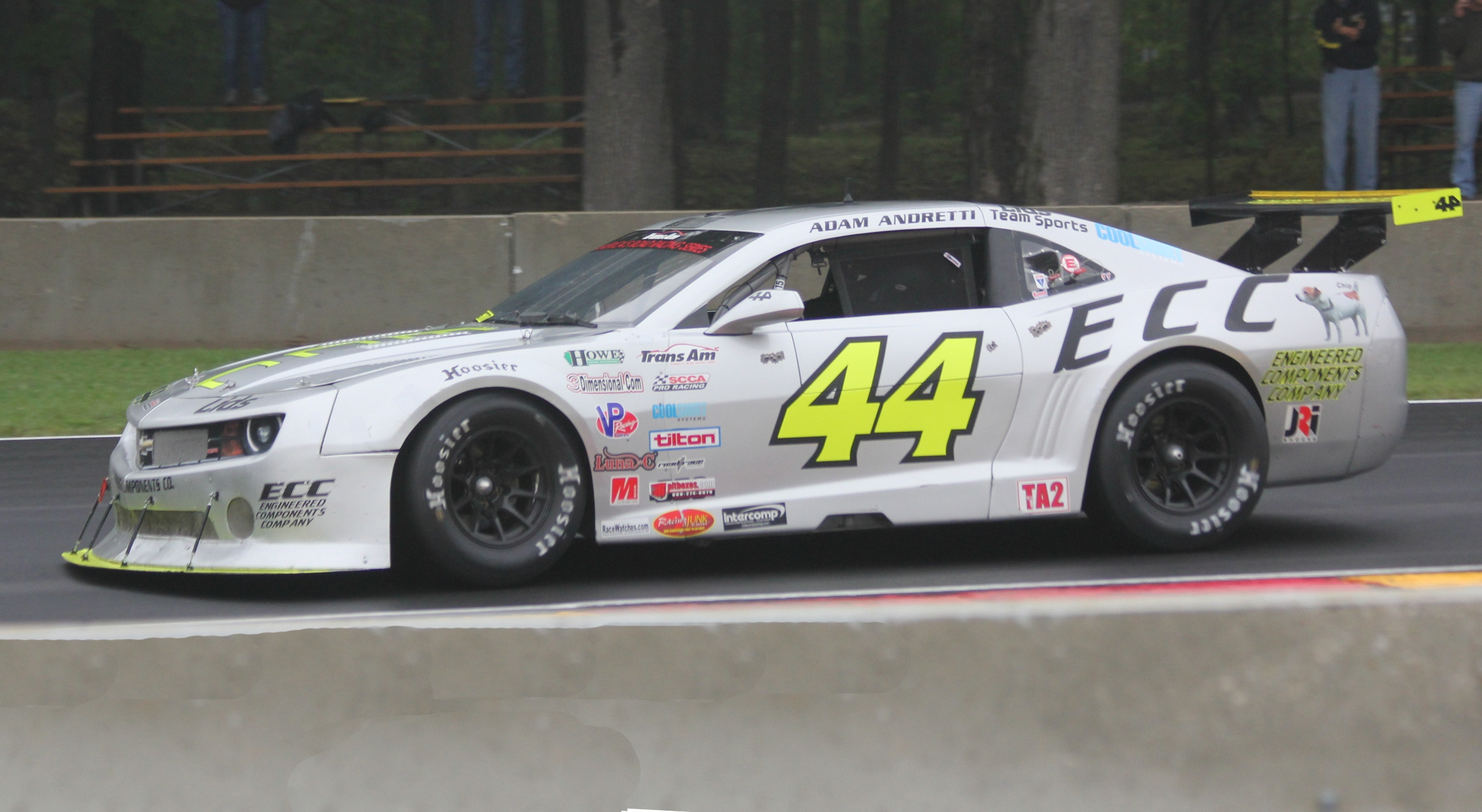
- Andretti driving his TA2 Trans-Am car at Road America in 2015
- Nationality: American
- Born: Adam Philip Andretti; March 24, 1979 (age 47) Brownsburg, Indiana, U.S.
- Relatives: Aldo Andretti (father); John Andretti (brother); Mario Andretti (uncle); Michael Andretti (cousin); Jeff Andretti (cousin); Marco Andretti (cousin); Jarett Andretti (nephew)

Trans-Am Series TA2 career
- Debut season: 2014
- Starts: 41
- Wins: 5
- Podiums: 16
- Poles: 7
- Best finish: 2nd in 2014
- Finished last season: 19th (2017)

Previous series
- 2000 2001–2002 2003 2007 2016 2017–2018: United States Formula 3 NASCAR Southwest Series; SPEED World Challenge; Indy Pro Series; NASCAR K&N Pro Series East; Stadium Super Trucks

NASCAR FedEx Freight Truck Series career
- 5 races run over 1 year
- 2026 position: 36th
- Best finish: 36th (2026)
- First race: 2026 Fr8 208 (Atlanta)
- Last race: 2026 Navy 250 (San Diego)
Wins	Top tens	Poles
0	0	0

NASCAR Canada Series career
- 2 races run over 1 year
- Best finish: 30th (2017)
- First race: 2017 Pinty's Grand Prix of Toronto (Toronto)
- Last race: 2017 Total Quartz 200 (Mosport)
Wins	Top tens	Poles
0	2	0

ARCA Menards Series East career
- 1 race run over 1 year
- Best finish: 46th (2016)
- First race: 2016 Bully Hill Vineyards 100 (Watkins Glen)
Wins	Top tens	Poles
0	1	0
- Statistics up to date as of November 6, 2026.

Adam Philip Andretti (born March 24, 1979) is an American professional racing driver. He last competed part-time in the NASCAR Craftsman Truck Series, driving the No. 5 Toyota Tundra TRD Pro for Tricon Garage.

Andretti has raced in sports cars, Indy Pro Series, NASCAR, and Stadium Super Trucks. He has been competing in the Trans-Am Series since 2014.

== Family background ==
Andretti is the younger brother of the late veteran NASCAR racer John Andretti, nephew of Indianapolis 500 winner Mario Andretti, and first cousin to IndyCar champion Michael Andretti and Jeff Andretti. He is the first cousin once-removed to IndyCar driver Marco Andretti. His late father Aldo Andretti, Mario's twin brother, retired from driving race cars after nearly dying in an accident. Andretti married Tabitha Eve on November 3, 2007. As of 2017, they reside in Brownsburg, Indiana. Andretti is a graduate of the Skip Barber Racing School.

== Racing career ==
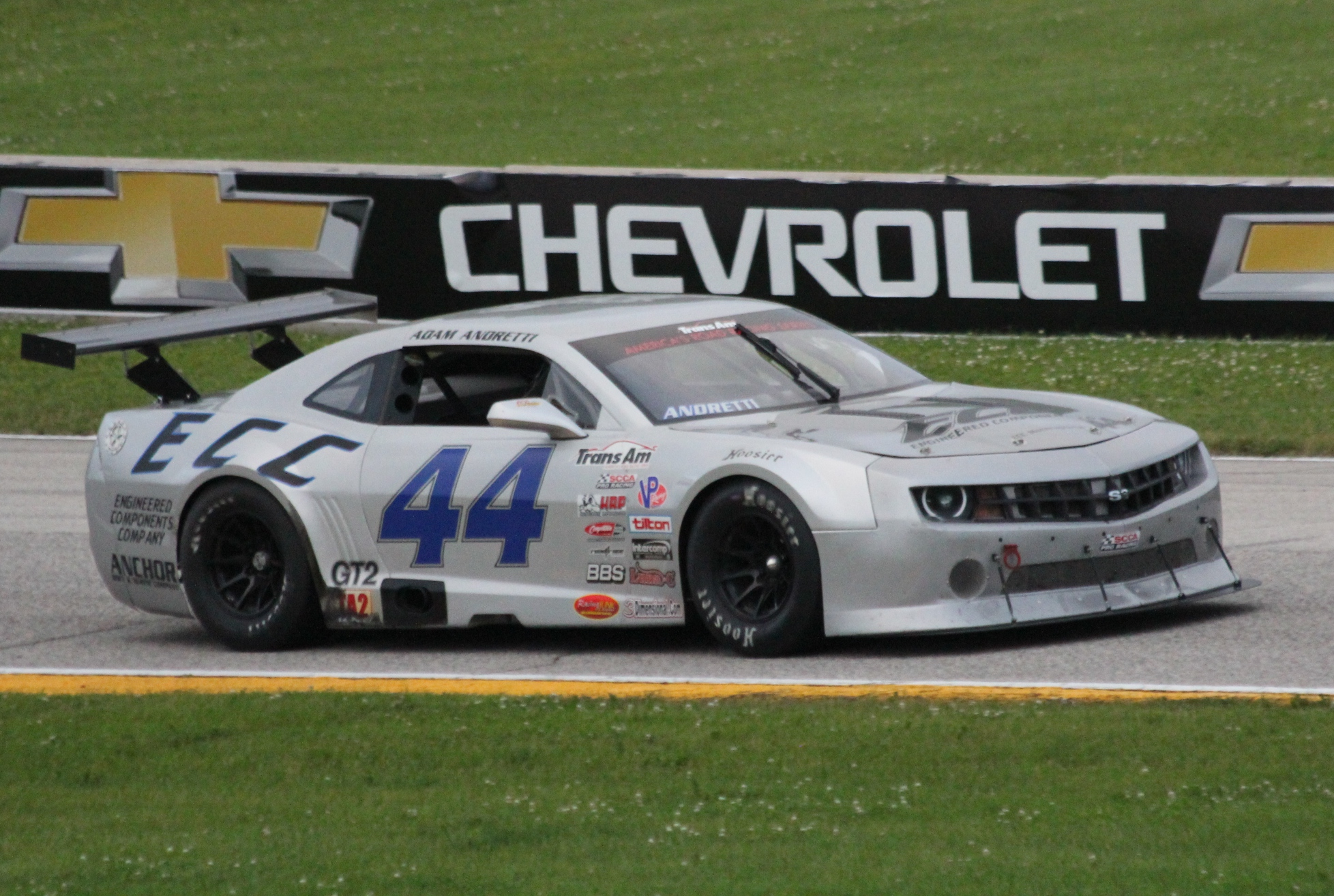
Andretti racing in his TA2 Trans Am Series car at Road America in 2014

Andretti's racing career started in 1994 at the age of fifteen with the help of his brother John, who helped Adam obtain a ride in the new half-scale Mini Cup Stock Car series, driving for Terry Lingner of Lingner Group Productions at the Velodrome in Indianapolis. He showed promise by winning four races in 1995 and finishing fourth in the series championship. After his stint in the Mini Stocks, Andretti raced karts. His brother Mark bought him a 125cc shifter kart, and they raced for the next two years in the SKUSA series. In 1998, he finished second at the Formula C World Karting Championship held in Charlotte, North Carolina. He also ran in the 24 Hours of Daytona, an event sponsored by the Grand American Road Racing Association.

In 2000, Andretti drove the No. 12 car in the short-lived United States Formula 3 Championship for Duesenberg Brothers Racing. He won a race and finished third in the series points championship. Then in 2001 and 2002, he drove in NASCAR's Featherlite Southwest Series. In 2003, Andretti drove a Corvette at Sebring Raceway in the SPEED World Challenge Series. He drove in the 2004 Rolex 24 Hours of Daytona.

Andretti made his Indy Pro Series debut at Chicagoland Speedway on September 9, 2007. His race ended with an altercation with IndyCar veteran Jimmy Kite. Andretti announced after the race that he would compete in a full Indy Pro Series season in 2008. On December 17, he announced that he had signed a deal with the new FuZion Autosport team for the upcoming season. However, the team and Andretti failed to participate in any league-sponsored test sessions or enter any races.

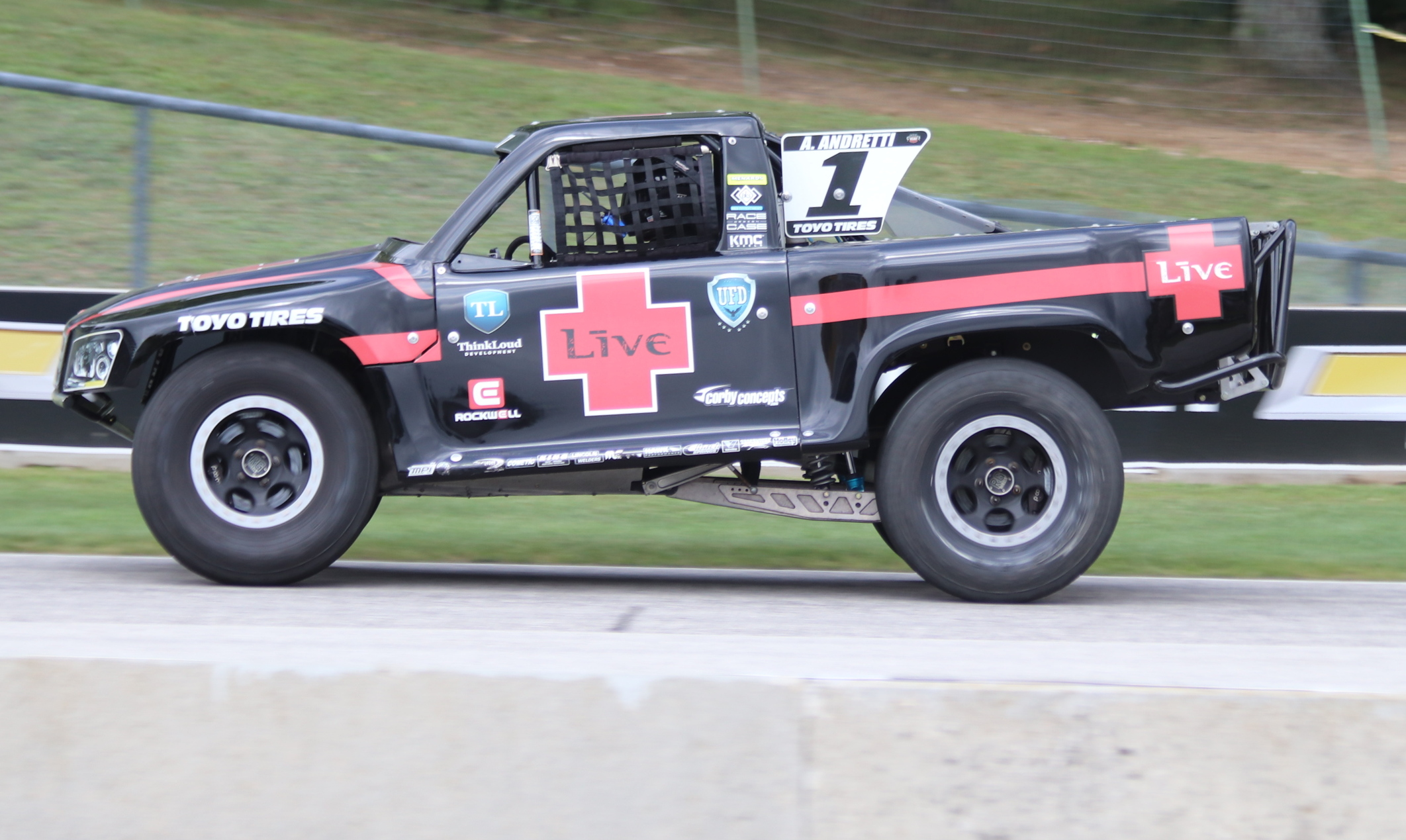
Andretti's No. 44 Stadium Super Truck at Road America in 2018

In 2014, Andretti became the first member of the Andretti family to compete in the Trans Am Series, doing so regularly in the TA2 class. He has raced a Camaro, a Mustang, and a Challenger, picking up six wins and finishing second in points twice.

In December 2017, Andretti joined UFD Racing for his Stadium Super Trucks debut at the Lake Elsinore Diamond in the No. 44 truck. He failed to qualify for the first feature race after finishing sixth in his heat race, and finished twelfth in the second feature after suffering a mechanical failure on lap eight.

Andretti returned to SST in August 2018 at Road America, where he finished eleventh and ninth in the weekend's two rounds.

On February 12, 2026, it was announced that Andretti would drive select races in the NASCAR Craftsman Truck Series, driving the No. 5 Toyota for Tricon Garage.

Andretti has also served as a racing instructor for Road & Track magazine and some driving schools, including the Richard Petty Driving Experience.

== Motorsports career results ==
=== Stock car career summary ===
Season	Series	Team	Races	Wins	Top 5	Top 10	Points	Position
2016	NASCAR K&N Pro Series East	Bob Schacht	1	0	0	1	36	46th
2017	NASCAR Pinty's Series	Scott Steckly	2	0	1	2	75	30th
2026	NASCAR Craftsman Truck Series	Tricon Garage	5	0	0	0	76	36th

=== American open-wheel racing ===
(key) (Races in bold indicate pole position)

==== Indy Lights ====
Year	Team	1	2	3	4	5	6	7	8	9	10	11	12	13	14	15	16	Rank	Points
2007	SpeedWorks	HMS	STP1	STP2	INDY	MIL	IMS1	IMS2	IOW	WGL1	WGL2	NSH	MOH	KTY	SNM1	SNM2	CHI; 18	41st	12

=== NASCAR ===
(key) (Bold – Pole position awarded by qualifying time. Italics – Pole position earned by points standings or practice time. * – Most laps led.)

==== Craftsman Truck Series ====
NASCAR Craftsman Truck Series results
Year	Team	No.	Make	1	2	3	4	5	6	7	8	9	10	11	12	13	14	15	16	17	18	19	20	21	22	23	24	25	NCTC	Pts	Ref
2026	Tricon Garage	5	Toyota	DAY	ATL; 12	STP; 23	DAR	CAR; 35	BRI	TEX	GLN; 25	DOV	CLT	NSH	MCH	COR; 14	LRP	NWS	IRP	RCH	NHA	BRI	KAN	CLT	PHO	TAL	MAR	HOM	36th	76	

^{*} Season still in progress
^{1} Ineligible for series points

==== K&N Pro Series East ====
NASCAR K&N Pro Series East results
Year	Team	No.	Make	1	2	3	4	5	6	7	8	9	10	11	12	13	14	NKNPSEC	Pts	Ref
2016	Bob Schacht	75	Toyota	NSM	MOB	GRE	BRI	VIR	DOM	STA	COL	NHA	IOW	GLN; 8	GRE	NJM	DOV	46th	36	

==== Pinty's Series ====
NASCAR Pinty's Series results
Year	Team	No.	Make	1	2	3	4	5	6	7	8	9	10	11	12	13	NPSC	Pts	Ref
2017	Scott Steckly	44	Dodge	MSP	DEL	ACD	ICAR	TOR; 3	SAS	SAS	EIR	CTR	RIS	MSP; 10	ASE	HAM	30th	75	

=== Stadium Super Trucks ===
(key) (Bold – Pole position. Italics – Fastest qualifier. * – Most laps led.)

Stadium Super Trucks results
Year	1	2	3	4	5	6	7	8	9	10	11	12	13	14	15	16	17	18	19	20	21	22	SSTC	Pts	Ref
2017	ADE	ADE	ADE	STP	STP	LBH	LBH	PER	PER	PER	DET	DET	TEX	TEX	HID	HID	HID	BEI	GLN	GLN	ELS; DNQ	ELS; 12	21st	34	
2018	ELS	ADE	ADE	ADE	LBH	LBH	PER	PER	DET	DET	TEX	TEX	ROA; 11	**ROA**; 9	SMP	SMP	HLN	HLN	MXC	MXC			23rd	23	
