= 2013 Trans-Am Series =

American sports car racing competition

Seasons
- ← 2012 2014 →

The 2013 Trans-Am Series was the 45th running of the Sports Car Club of America's Trans-Am Series.

== Rule changes ==
The GGT class of the previous year was replaced by the TA3 class. The TA3 class was later broken into two groups TA3-International, based on SCCA GT2 rules, and TA3-American Muscle, based on NASA American Iron Racing class rules, with year and model restrictions.

== Calendar and results ==
Round	Circuit	Date	TA Winning driver	TA Winning vehicle	TA2 Winning driver	TA2 Winning vehicle	TA3 Winning driver	TA3 Winning vehicle
1	Sebring International Raceway	March 3	(United States) Doug Peterson	Chevrolet Corvette	(United States) Cameron Lawrence	Chevrolet Camaro	(United States) C. David Seuss	Porsche 996
2	Canadian Tire Motorsport Park	May 19	(United States) Doug Peterson	Chevrolet Corvette	(United States) Tony Buffomante	Chevrolet Camaro	(United States) Chuck Cassaro	Ford Mustang
3	Lime Rock Park	May 25	(United States) Paul Fix	Chevrolet Corvette	(United States) Bob Stretch	Chevrolet Camaro	(United States) C. David Seuss	Porsche 996
4	Watkins Glen International	June 9	(United States) Doug Peterson	Chevrolet Corvette	(United States) Cameron Lawrence	Chevrolet Camaro	(United States) C. David Seuss	Porsche 996
5	Road America	June 21	(United States) Doug Peterson	Chevrolet Corvette	(United States) Cameron Lawrence	Chevrolet Camaro	(United States) Chuck Cassaro	Ford Mustang
6	Mid-Ohio Sports Car Course	August 17	(United States) Cliff Ebben	Ford Mustang	(United States) Cameron Lawrence	Chevrolet Camaro	(United States) Todd Napieralski	Chevrolet Camaro
7	Brainerd International Raceway	September 1	(United States) Doug Peterson	Chevrolet Corvette	(United States) Cameron Lawrence	Chevrolet Camaro	(United States) C. David Seuss	Porsche 996
8	Virginia International Raceway	September 29	(United States) Simon Gregg	Chevrolet Corvette	(United States) Cameron Lawrence	Chevrolet Camaro	(United States) Steve Kent Jr.	Ford Mustang
9	Road Atlanta	November 3	(United States) Tony Ave	Chevrolet Corvette	(United States) Cameron Lawrence	Chevrolet Camaro	(United States) Todd Napieralski	Chevrolet Camaro
10	Daytona International Speedway	November 17	(United States) Doug Peterson	Chevrolet Corvette	(United States) Cameron Lawrence	Chevrolet Camaro	(United States) Steve Kent Jr.	Ford Mustang

== Changes ==
On December 21, 2012, Trans Am announced that the Ford Mustang would be added to the TA2 class, first introduced in 2010.

== Driver standings ==
=== TA ===
Pos	Driver	Car	Starts	Points
1	(United States) Doug Peterson	Chevrolet Corvette	10	188
2	(United States) Simon Gregg	Chevrolet Corvette	10	138
3	(United States) Cliff Ebben	Ford Mustang	10	135
4	(United States) Amy Ruman	Chevrolet Corvette	10	87
5	(United States) Tony Ave	Chevrolet Corvette	5	79
6	(United States) David Pintaric	Chevrolet Corvette	9	67
7	(United States) Paul Fix	Chevrolet Corvette	4	58
8	(Canada) Allan Lewis	Chevrolet Corvette	5	42
9	(United States) John Baucom	Ford Mustang	6	41
10	(United States) Denny Lamers	Ford Mustang	5	38
11	(United States) Jim McAleese	Chevrolet Corvette	3	32
12	(United States) Kenny Bupp	Chevrolet Corvette	4	32
13	(United States) Rick Dittman	Chevrolet Corvette	3	25
14	(United States) Charles Wicht	Chevrolet Corvette	2	24
15	(United States) Jordan Bupp	Chevrolet Corvette	3	22
16	(United States) Kyle Kelley	Chevrolet Corvette	2	18
17	(Canada) Andrew Romocki	Chevrolet Corvette	2	17
18	(United States) Mike Skeen	Jaguar XKR	1	16
19	(United States) Bob Monette	Jaguar XKR	2	15
20	(United States) Tomy Drissi	Chevrolet Corvette	1	14
21	(United States) Kerry Hitt	Chevrolet Corvette	3	12
22	(United States) Jed Copham	Chevrolet Corvette	1	11
23	(United States) David Fershtand	Chevrolet Corvette	1	11
24	(United States) Jim Peruto	Chevrolet Corvette	2	10
25	(United States) Ted Sullivan	Chevrolet Camaro	1	9
26	(Canada) Blaise Csida	Chevrolet Corvette	1	9
27	(United States) Richard Grant	Chevrolet Corvette	1	8
28	(United States) Tim Rubright	Ford Mustang	1	2
29	(United States) Jon Leavy	Chevrolet Camaro	1	1

=== TA2 ===
Pos	Driver	Car	Starts	Points
1	(United States) Cameron Lawrence	Chevrolet Camaro	10	210
2	(United States) Bob Stretch	Chevrolet Camaro	9	104
3	(United States) Gregg Rodgers	Chevrolet Camaro	10	99
4	(United States) Kurt Roehrig	Chevrolet Camaro	10	88
5	(United States) Bob Stretch	Chevrolet Camaro/Ford Mustang	9	85
6	(United States) Robert Huffmaster	Chevrolet Camaro	8	78
7	(United States) Pete Halsmer	Chevrolet Camaro	7	78
8	(United States) Scott Ferguson	Pontiac GTO	9	69
9	(United States) Tom Sheehan	Chevrolet Camaro	10	67
10	(United States) Dale Madsen	Ford Mustang	10	57
11	(United States) Mel Shaw	Chevrolet Camaro	10	50
12	(Canada) Mike McGahern	Chevrolet Camaro	4	41
13	(United States) John Atwell	Chevrolet Camaro	5	37
14	(United States) Michael Wilson	Chevrolet Monte Carlo	5	33
16	(United States) Tony Buffomante	Chevrolet Camaro	1	23
17	(United States) Joe Sturm	Chevrolet Camaro	3	20
18	(United States) Kenneth Liesfield	Chevrolet Camaro	2	20
19	(United States) Britt Casey	Chevrolet Camaro	2	17
20	(United States) Ron Keith	Chevrolet Camaro	1	12
21	(United States) Adam Andretti	Chevrolet Camaro	3	12
22	(Canada) Kevin Poitras	Chevrolet Camaro	1	11
23	(United States) Mary Wright	Chevrolet Camaro	2	10
24	(United States) Allen Milarcik	Chevrolet Camaro	1	10
25	(United States) Bill Prietzel	Chevrolet Monte Carlo	1	7
26	(United States) Seth Duval	Ford Mustang	1	7
27	(United States) Kenneth Quartuccio	Chevrolet Camaro	1	6
28	(Australia) Geoff Fane	Chevrolet Camaro	1	1
29	(United States) Ricky Sanders	Chevrolet Monte Carlo	1	1
30	(United States) Mike Miller	Chevrolet Camaro	1	1
31	(United Kingdom) James Winslow	Chevrolet Camaro	1	1
32	(United States) A. J. Henriksen	Chevrolet Camaro	1	1
33	(Canada) Martin Barkey	Chevrolet Camaro	1	1

=== TA3 ===
==== International ====
Pos	Driver	Car	Starts	Points
1	(United States) David Seuss	Porsche 996 GT3	7	156
2	(United States) Tim Gray	Porsche 996 GT3	6	107
3	(United States) Mickey Mills	BMW M3	4	57

==== American Muscle ====
Pos	Driver	Car	Starts	Points
1	(United States) Chuck Cassaro	Ford Mustang	9	127
2	(United States) Rob Bodle	Ford Mustang	8	101
3	(United States) Steve Kent Jr.	Ford Mustang	5	99
4	(United States) Rich Jones	Ford Mustang	4	61
5	(United States) Todd Napieralski	Chevrolet Camaro	3	49
6	(United States) Robert Korzen	Ford Mustang	3	36
7	(United States) Dane Moxlow	Ford Mustang	1	19
8	(United States) Ernie Francis Jr.	Chevrolet Camaro	1	19
9	(United States) Richard Golinello	Ford Mustang	1	5
