= 2012 Trans-Am Series =

American sports car racing competition

Seasons
- ← 2011 2013 →

The 2012 Trans-Am Series was the 44th season of the Sports Car Club of America's Trans American Road Racing Championship.

== New management ==
From 2012 onward, Trans-Am Race Company, LLC, has managed the series. They will manage the series until at least 2016. They are looking to "bring the series back to its glory years". Their plan is to get away from the new, three-class format and return to the pony cars that made the series famous.

The series also established a media partner, GoRacingTV. Select markets would also be able to view Trans Am races on MAVTV. GoRacingTV was a website providing highlights of various racing events.

== News ==
It was announced on November 17, 2011, that a new Ford Mustang was in the works for entry into the series during the 2012 season. The car will use the 302 cubic inch (5 liter) engine from the production model.

== Highlights ==
Though he won only one race, Chuck Cassaro would go on to overcome Tim Gray's four victories and win the GGT Championship by a comfortable 36 points, giving (American manufacturer) Panoz its first ever Trans Am title. With a GGT win at Mid Ohio, courtesy of Belgian driver Jan Heylen, Dodge garnered its first Trans Am victory since 2001.

== Schedule ==
Round	Date	Circuit	TA Winning driver	TA Winning vehicle	TA2 Winning driver	TA2 Winning vehicle	GGT Winning driver	GGT Winning vehicle
1	Mosport	May 20	(United States) Doug Peterson	Chevrolet Corvette	(United States) Pete Halsmer	Chevrolet Camaro	no entries	
2	Lime Rock	May 26	(United States) Simon Gregg	Chevrolet Corvette	(United States) Bob Stretch	Chevrolet Camaro	no entries	
3	Mid-Ohio	June 10	(United States) Simon Gregg	Chevrolet Corvette	(United States) Bob Stretch	Chevrolet Camaro	(Belgium) Jan Heylen	Dodge Challenger
4	New Jersey	July 1	(United States) Amy Ruman	Chevrolet Corvette	(United States) Pete Halsmer	Chevrolet Camaro	no entries	
5	Watkins Glen	July 8	(Puerto Rico) Jorge Diaz, Jr.	Jaguar XKR	(United States) Pete Halsmer	Chevrolet Camaro	(United States) C. David Seuss	Porsche 911 GT3
6	Road America	August 19	(United States) Tony Ave	Chevrolet Corvette	(United States) Bob Stretch	Chevrolet Camaro	(United States) Chuck Cassaro	Panoz Esperante GTS
7–8	Brainerd	September 2	(United States) Tony Ave	Chevrolet Corvette	(United States) Pete Halsmer	Chevrolet Camaro	(United States) Tim Gray	Porsche 911 GT3
7–8	Brainerd	September 3	(United States) Amy Ruman	Chevrolet Corvette	(United States) Bob Stretch	Chevrolet Camaro	(United States) Tim Gray	Porsche 911 GT3
9–10	Road Atlanta	November 3	(United States) Tony Ave	Chevrolet Corvette	(United States) Kurt Roehrig	Chevrolet Camaro	(United States) Tim Gray	Porsche 911 GT3
9–10	Road Atlanta	November 4	(United States) Doug Peterson	Chevrolet Corvette	(United States) Cameron Lawrence	Chevrolet Camaro	(United States) Tim Gray	Porsche 911 GT3

== Driver standings ==
=== TA ===
Pos	Driver	Car	Starts	Points
1	(United States) Simon Gregg	Chevrolet Corvette	10	263
2	(United States) Amy Ruman	Chevrolet Corvette	10	252
3	(United States) Tony Ave	Chevrolet Corvette	10	249
4	(United States) Doug Peterson	Chevrolet Corvette	9	224
5	(Canada) Ian Patterson	Chevrolet Corvette	5	105
6	(Canada) Andrew Romocki	Ford Mustang	4	82
7	(Canada) Blaise Csida	Chevrolet Corvette	5	78
8	(Canada) Allan Lewis	Chevrolet Corvette	4	76
9	(United States) Denny Lamers	Ford Mustang	3	66
10	(United States) David Jans	Ford Mustang	3	64
11	(United States) John Baucom	Ford Mustang	3	58
12	(Canada) Jonathan Brett	Chevrolet Corvette	2	42
12	(United States) Matt Crandall	Ford Mustang	2	42
14	(United States) Rick Dittman	Chevrolet Corvette	2	36
14	(United States) Bob Monett	Jaguar XKR	2	36
16	(Puerto Rico) Jorge Diaz, Jr.	Jaguar XKR	1	32
17	(United States) Cliff Ebben	Ford Mustang	1	27
18	(Dominican Republic) R. J. López	Chevrolet Corvette	1	16

=== TA2 ===
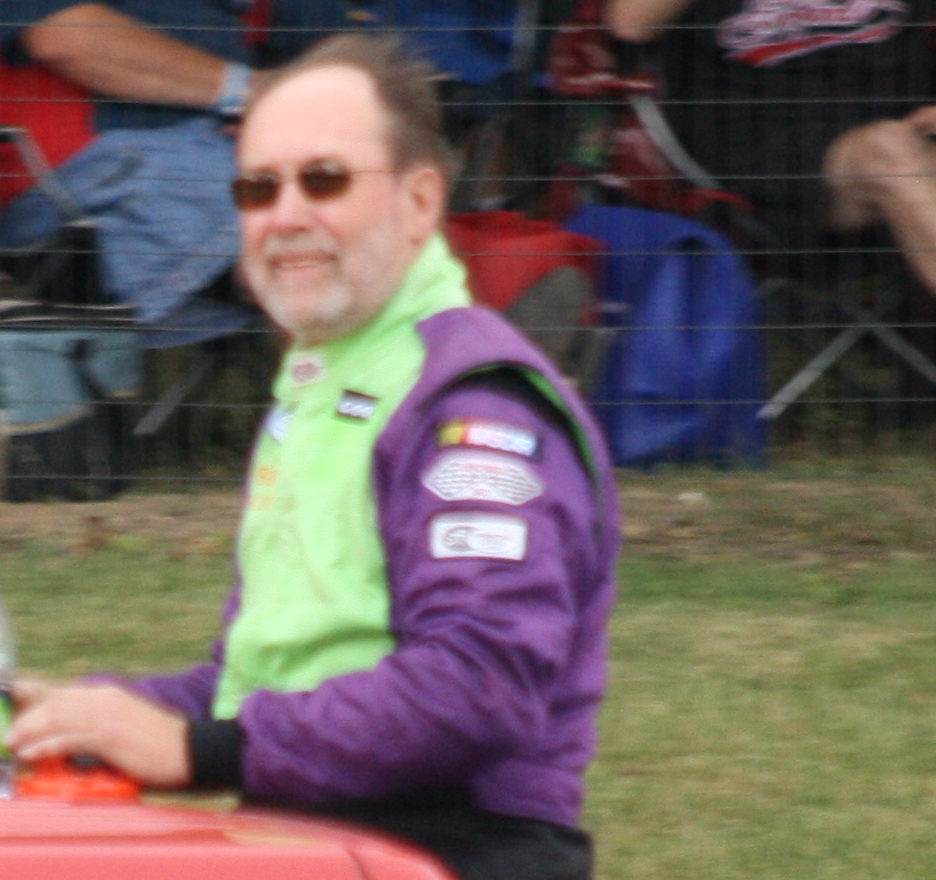
Bill Prietzel

Pos	Driver	Car	Starts	Points
1	(United States) Bob Stretch	Chevrolet Camaro	10	274
2	(United States) Pete Halsmer	Chevrolet Camaro	10	251
3	(United States) Kurt Roehrig	Chevrolet Camaro	10	217
4	(United States) Michael Wilson	Chevrolet Monte Carlo	10	213
5	(United States) Tom Sheehan	Chevrolet Camaro	10	208
6	(United States) Cameron Lawrence	Chevrolet Impala/Camaro	7	170
7	(United States) Mel Shaw	Chevrolet Camaro	10	161
8	(United States) Chris Liesfeld	Chevrolet Camaro	7	139
9	(Australia) Geoff Fane	Chevrolet Monte Carlo	5	119
10	(United States) Mike Miller	Chevrolet Camaro	3	71
11	(United States) Joe Sturm	Chevrolet Monte Carlo	3	57
12	(United States) Britt Casey	Chevrolet Camaro	3	55
13	(United States) Roger Reuse	Chevrolet Camaro	2	41
14	(United States) Bill Prietzel	Chevrolet Monte Carlo	2	39
15	(United States) Bobby Reuse	Chevrolet Camaro	2	38
16	(United States) Shane Doles	Chevrolet Monte Carlo	2	34
17	(United States) Ricky Sanders	Chevrolet Monte Carlo	2	33
18	(United States) Gregg Rodgers	Chevrolet Camaro	1	25
19	(United States) John Atwell	Chevrolet Camaro	1	23
20	(United States) John Cottrell	Chevrolet Monte Carlo	1	16
21	(United States) A. J. Henriksen	Chevrolet Camaro	1	14
22	(United States) Mary Wright	Chevrolet Camaro	1	12

=== GGT ===
Pos	Driver	Car	Starts	Points
1	(United States) Chuck Cassaro	Panoz Esperante GTS	5	167
2	(United States) Tim Gray	Porsche 911 GT3	4	131
3	(United States) C. David Seuss	Porsche 911 GT3	2	59
4	(Belgium) Jan Heylen	Dodge Challenger	1	33
5	(United States) Mickey Mills	BMW M3	1	28
