= 2011 Trans-Am Series =

American sports car racing competition

Seasons
- ← 2010 2012 →

The 2011 Trans-Am Series was the 43rd season of the Sports Car Club of America's Trans-Am Series, a class of racing that straddles the line between sports car and stock car auto racing.

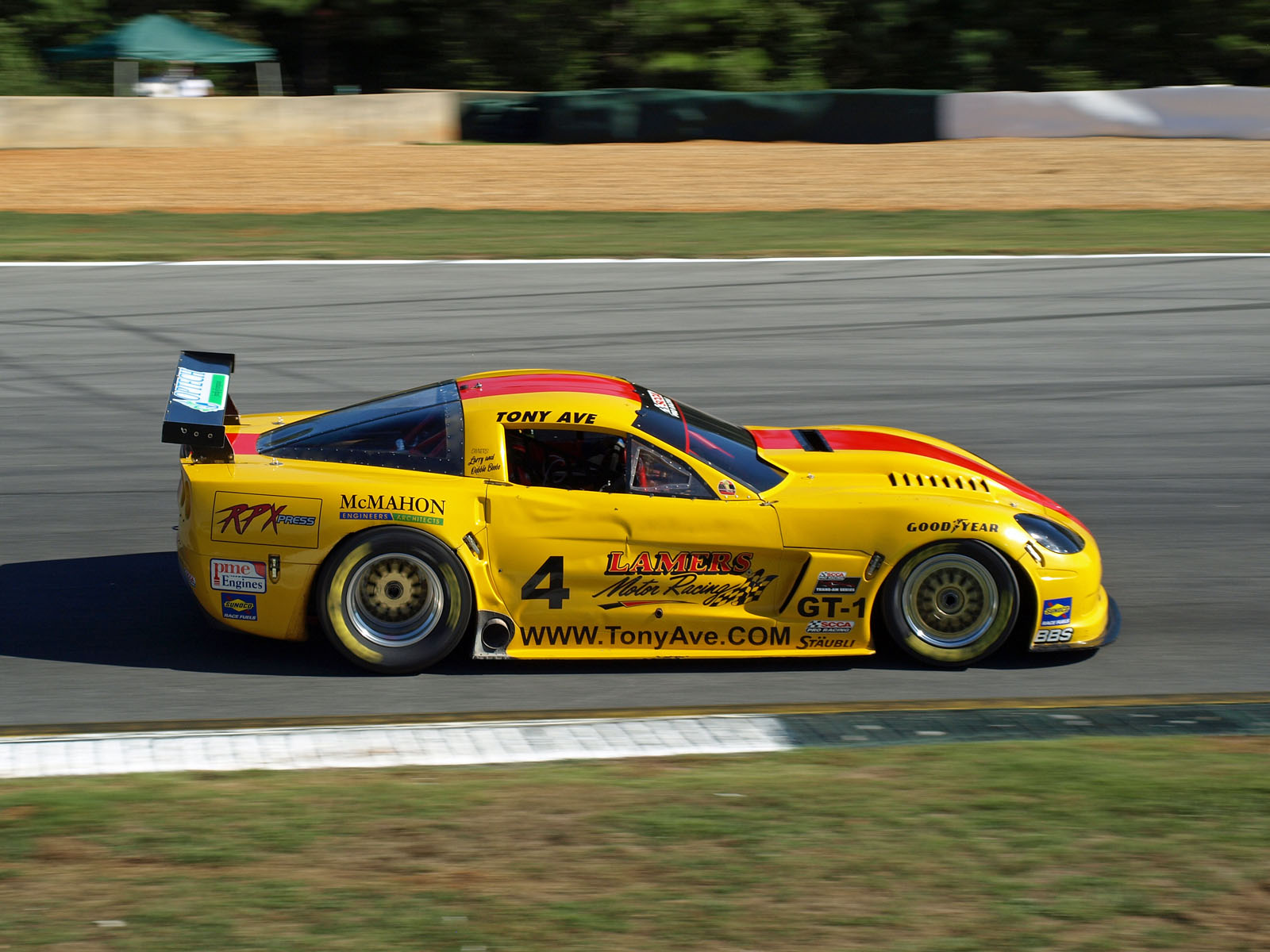
2011 champion Tony Ave at Road Atlanta

The 2011 schedule consisted of races on 8 road courses and one temporary street circuit. It was the first season that utilized the new multi-class format. The TA1 class is for the previous spec of Trans-Am cars. The TA2 class was added for cars that meet SCCA GT2-class specifications. These cars were primarily stock cars, some of which have been rebodied with pony car bodywork. A third class, TA3, for cars meeting SCCA GT3-class specifications was announced, which mainly consisted of smaller and lower-powered sports cars than TA1. However, there were no TA3 entries in 2011. For the final race of the season, a new class, Global GT (GGT) was introduced for production-based sports cars.

2010 champ Tony Ave won 6 of the 9 races to repeat as champion. Bob Stretch won the TA2 class in 5 of the 7 races he contested to win the inaugural TA2 championship.

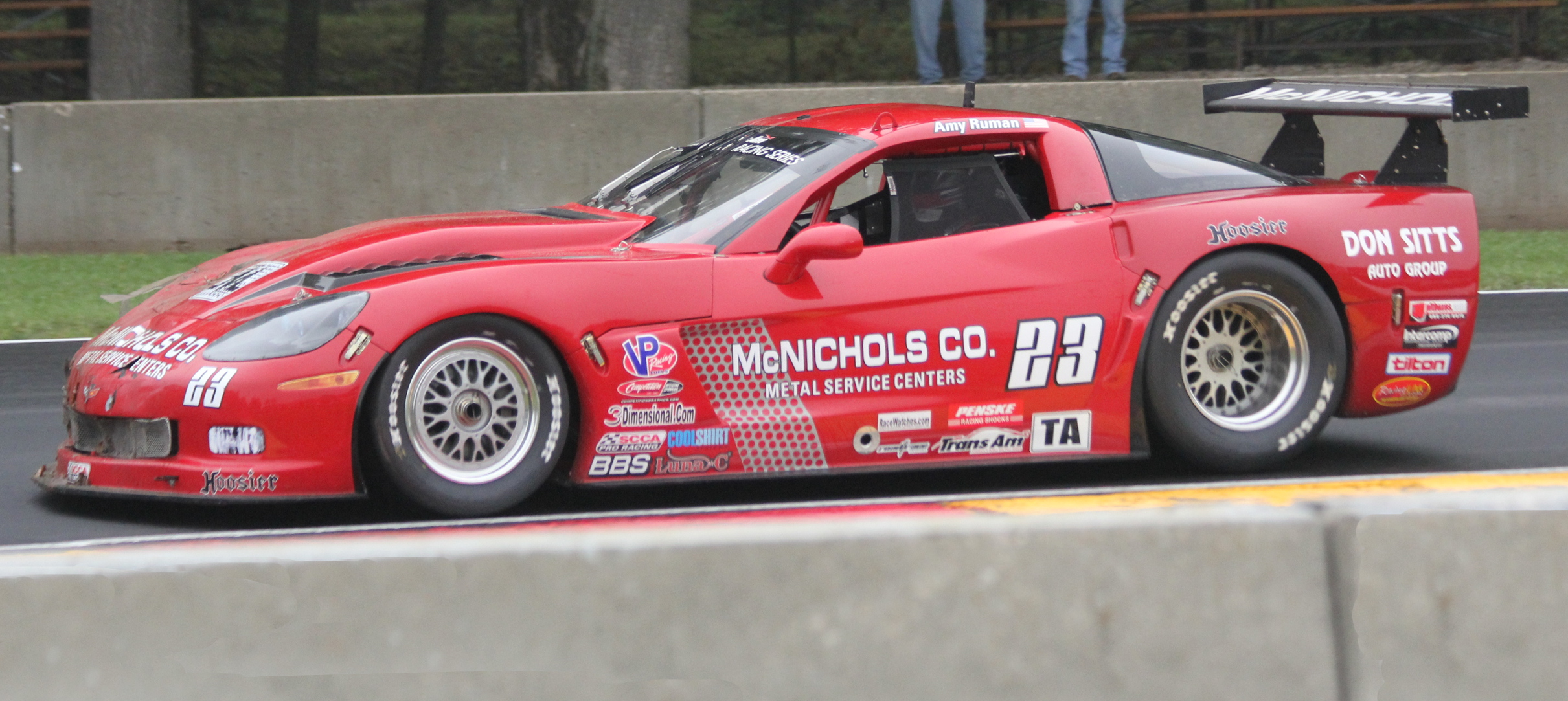
Amy Ruman made history on September 30, 2011.

Although she was not the first woman to compete in the Trans-Am Series (Janet Guthrie, 1978), Amy Ruman became the first one in the series' 45-year history to win a race, accomplishing the feat in the season finale at Road Atlanta.

The event at Miller is thus far the only post-hiatus Trans Am event in the Western United States.

== Schedule ==
Rnd	Date	Circuit	Distance	TA1 Winning Car	TA2 Winning Car	GGT Winning Car
Rnd	Date	Circuit	Distance	TA1 Winning Driver(s)	TA2 Winning Driver(s)	GGT Winning Driver(s)
1	March 18	Sebring International Raceway, Sebring, Florida	103.5 mi (166.6 km)	Chevrolet Corvette	Chevrolet Camaro	
1	March 18	Sebring International Raceway, Sebring, Florida	103.5 mi (166.6 km)	(Dominican Republic) R. J. López	(United States) Gregg Rodgers	
2	May 1	Miller Motorsports Park, Tooele, Utah	100.584 mi (161.874 km)	Chevrolet Corvette	Chevrolet Camaro	
2	May 1	Miller Motorsports Park, Tooele, Utah	100.584 mi (161.874 km)	(United States) Tony Ave	(United States) Gregg Rodgers	
3	May 15	Virginia International Raceway, Danville, Virginia	101.37 mi (163.14 km)	Chevrolet Corvette	Chevrolet Camaro	
3	May 15	Virginia International Raceway, Danville, Virginia	101.37 mi (163.14 km)	(United States) Tony Ave	(United States) Bob Stretch	
4	May 22	Mosport International Raceway, Bowmanville, Ontario	100.819 mi (162.252 km)	Chevrolet Corvette	Chevrolet Camaro	
4	May 22	Mosport International Raceway, Bowmanville, Ontario	100.819 mi (162.252 km)	(United States) Tony Ave	(United States) Bob Stretch	
5	August 7	Circuit Trois-Rivières, Trois-Rivières, Quebec	92.781 mi (149.317 km)	Chevrolet Corvette	Chevrolet Camaro	
5	August 7	Circuit Trois-Rivières, Trois-Rivières, Quebec	92.781 mi (149.317 km)	(United States) Tony Ave	(United States) Bob Stretch	
6	August 20	Road America, Elkhart Lake, Wisconsin	101.2 mi (162.9 km)	Ford Mustang	Porsche 997	
6	August 20	Road America, Elkhart Lake, Wisconsin	101.2 mi (162.9 km)	(United States) Cliff Ebben	(United States) Scott Tucker	
7	September 3	Brainerd International Raceway, Brainerd, Minnesota	100 mi (160 km)	Chevrolet Corvette	Chevrolet Camaro	
7	September 3	Brainerd International Raceway, Brainerd, Minnesota	100 mi (160 km)	(United States) Tony Ave	(United States) Bob Stretch	
8	September 4	Brainerd International Raceway, Brainerd, Minnesota	100 mi (160 km)	Chevrolet Corvette	Chevrolet Camaro	
8	September 4	Brainerd International Raceway, Brainerd, Minnesota	100 mi (160 km)	(United States) Tony Ave	(United States) Bob Stretch	
9	September 30	Road Atlanta, Braselton, Georgia		Chevrolet Corvette	Chevrolet Camaro	Ferrari F430
9	September 30	Road Atlanta, Braselton, Georgia		(United States) Amy Ruman	(United States) Mike Skeen	(United States) Scott Tucker

== Driver standings ==
=== TA1 ===
Pos	Driver	Starts	Points
1	(United States) Tony Ave	9	1122
2	(United States) Simon Gregg	9	893
3	(United States) Amy Ruman	8	763
4	(United States) David Jans	9	738
5	(United States) Doug Harrington	8	712
6	(Trinidad and Tobago) Daniel Ramoutarsingh	7	671
7	(United States) Cliff Ebben	5	546
8	(United States) John Baucom	6	470
9	(United States) Carlos de Quesada	6	386
10	(United States) Denny Lamers	4	302
11	(United States) Doug Peterson	5	298
12	(Dominican Republic) R. J. Lopez	3	295
13	(Canada) Blaise Csida	2	208
14	(United States) Glen Jung	3	180
15	(United States) Kenny Bupp	2	160
16	(United States) Bob Monette	2	160

=== TA2 ===
Pos	Driver	Starts	Points
1	(United States) Bob Stretch	7	893
2	(United States) Bill Prietzel	7	695
3	(United States) Ricky Sanders	6	642
4	(United States) Greg Rodgers	4	465
5	(United States) Tom Sheehan	3	304
6	(United States) J. Thomas Graham	2	184
7	(United States) Mel Shaw	2	176
8	(United States) Mike Skeen	1	137
9	(United States) J. Kurt Roehrig	1	116
10	(United States) Tony Amico	1	110
