= 141 Speedway =

Race track in Maribel, Wisconsin

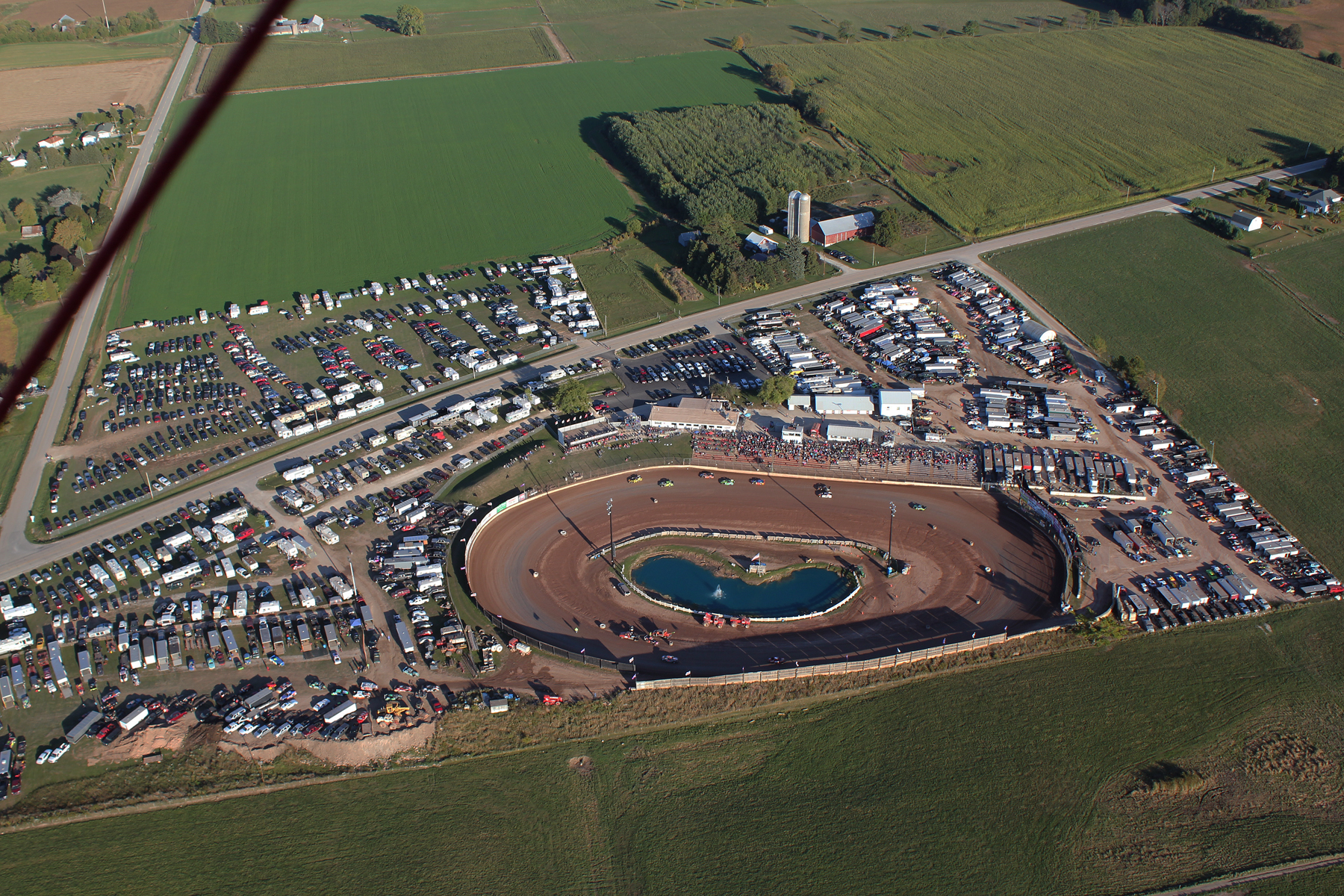
- 141 Speedway in 2024
- Location: Maribel, Wisconsin
- Coordinates: 44.2455°N 88.2603°W
- Capacity: 3,000 (grandstands)
- Owner: Toby Kruse; Tim Czarneski
- Operator: Toby Kruse; Dan Ratajczak; Scott Ratajczak
- Broke ground: 1960
- Opened: 1960, 1998
- Closed: 1990 - 1997
- Major events: Current: United States Modified Touring Series, "The Creek" series Former: Lucas Oil Late Model Dirt Series, INEX Legends Dirt Oval Nationals, Dirt Kings Tour, Mid-American Stock Car Series

1/3 mile
- Surface: clay
- Length: 0.33 mi (0.53 km)
- Turns: 4

1/4 mile
- Surface: asphalt
- Length: 0.25 mi (0.4 km)
- Turns: 4

141 Speedway (formerly Super 141 Speedway) is a dirt racing track located between Maribel and Francis Creek, Wisconsin. The track is 1/3-mile and hosts a weekly racing program with numerous International Motor Contest Association classes.

== History ==
The land for 141 was acquired in 1959 by original owner Dick Grall; the track was built and the then-Super 141 Speedway opened in 1960. Grall operated the track until 1975 and leased the track until 1990, when a promoter reneged on two years' worth of leasing agreements, closing the track while litigation played out. Grall lost the desire to lease the track, but Matt Rowe bought the track from Grall in late 1997 and re-opened the track for the 1998 season.

The track was originally an asphalt oval, but management made the decision to convert to a dirt track before the 2010 season. The resulting dirt track was 1/3-mile, as the asphalt track was 1/4-mile. After the 2013 season, previous owners Bruce and Renee Conard sold the track to Scott Ratajczak, local racer Dan Ratajczak, and Iowa dirt racing promoter Toby Kruse.

In 2017, the track sued Manitowoc County over parking on a parcel of land across the road from the track; the parcel was later rezoned by a county board to allow parking.

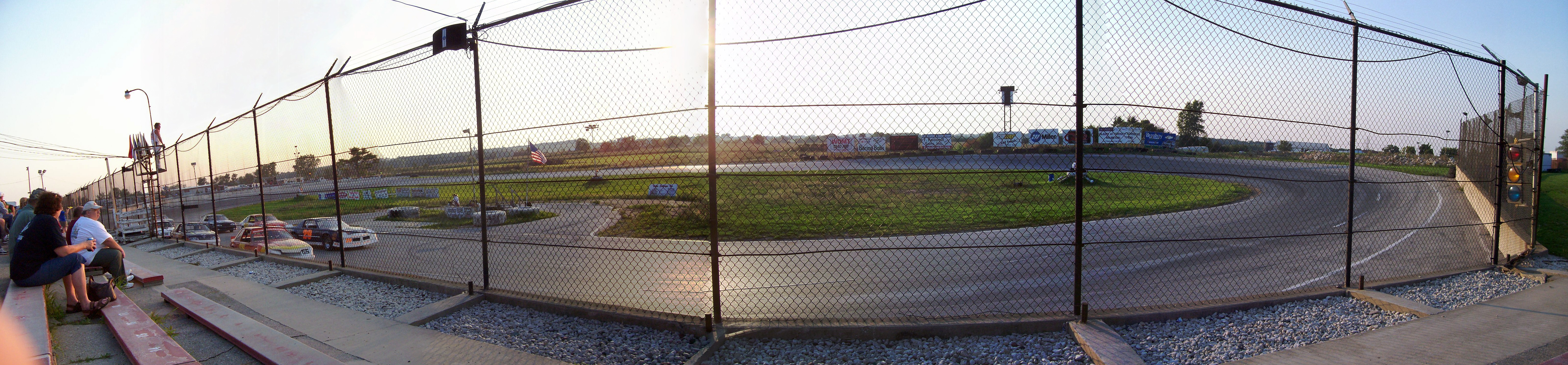
141 Speedway as an asphalt track in 2007

== Events ==
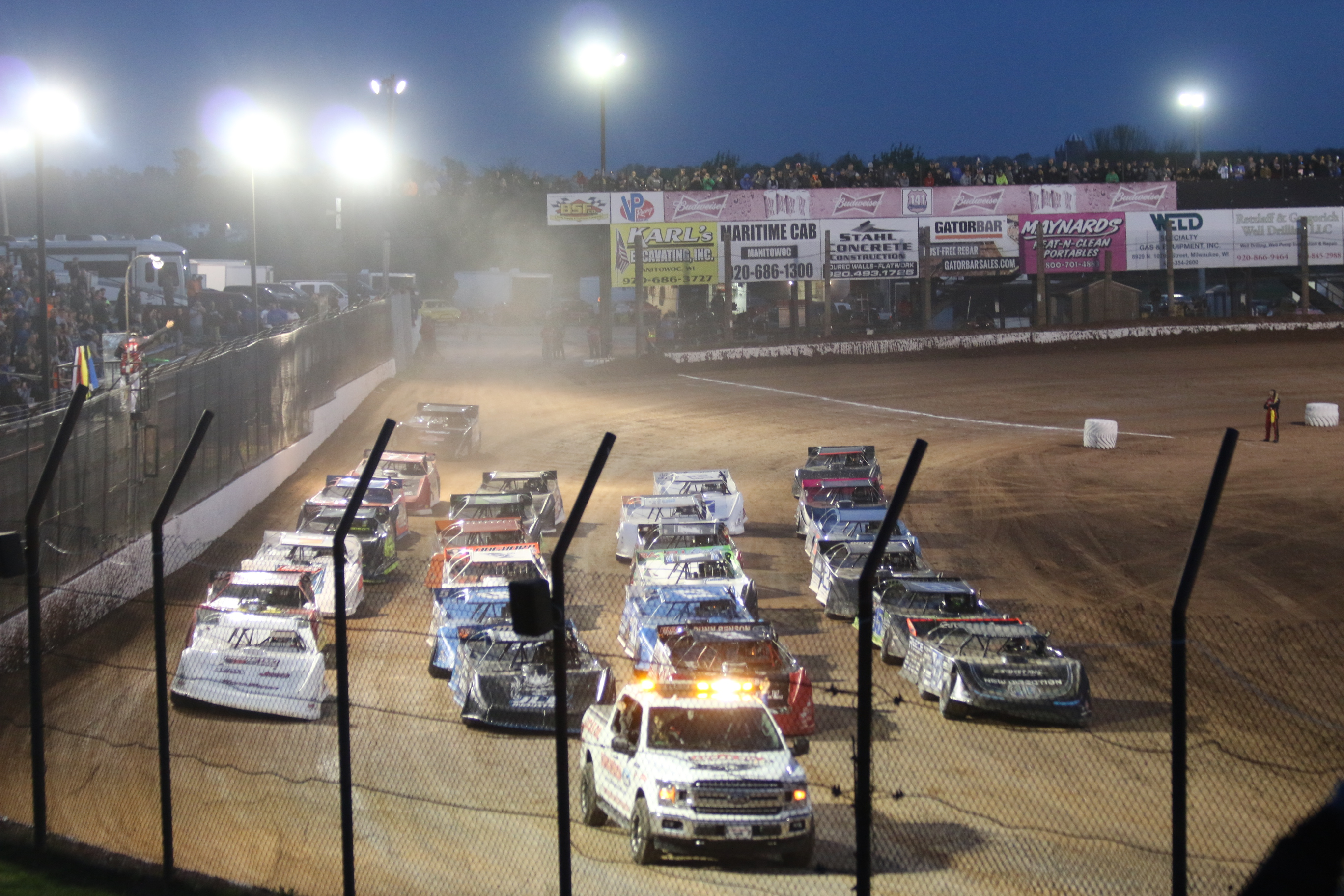
2018 Lucas Oil Late Model Dirt Series on frontstretch

141 hosts a series of "The Creek" events: The Clash at the Creek, described as a crown jewel IMCA Modified race; the King at the Creek, an IMCA Stock Car event, and the Captain of the Creek, an IMCA Sport Mod event. The track has also hosted the IRA Sprints, and has also been a national championship venue for INEX dirt oval legends cars. In 2018, the Lucas Oil Late Model Dirt Series visited the track.

In 2024, 141 Speedway announced the introduction of a new event, “Car Wars,” scheduled to be held as the final race of the season following the Treek Strong Creek Classic in mid-October. The event features all regularly competing divisions racing for increased prize money and serves as the final dirt track racing event of the year in the region.

The track held a Mid-American Stock Car Series date in the 2000s.

== Sanctioning ==
The Eastern Wisconsin Racing Association sanctioned the track from 1971 until 1978, and the track entered into a sanctioning agreement with the International Motor Contest Association in 1986. It lost IMCA sanctioning in 2011 when a change to Saturday night events resulted in conflicts with other local IMCA-sanctioned tracks.

== Track Champions (Dirt) ==
Track Champions (2010–2025)
Year	Grand National	Street Stock	Sport Modified	Stock Car	Modified	Four Cylinder
2025	Not contested	Trey Van Straten	Coy Vlies	Rod Snellenberger	Johnny Whitman	Shaun Bangart
2024	Joshua Pierce	Austin Steinke	Coy Vlies	Cole Czarneski	Cole Czarneski	Trevor Cronick
2023	Derek Schrauth	Paul Diefenthaler	Zachary Raab	Kyle Resch	Shawn Kilgore	Justin Finlan
2022	Mike King	Edward Anschutz	Cody Rass	Luke Lemmens	Cody Schroeder	Jake Peters
2021	Joshua Pierce	Adam Crasper	Jacob Zellner	Devin Snellenberger	Gregory Gretz	Alvin Testroete
2020	Terry Van Roy	Jesse Krahn	Randy LeMieux Jr.	Luke Lemmens	Todd Dart	Ethan Beattie
2019	Don Sorce	Adam Crasper	Bill Elder	Josh Mroczkowski	Johnny Whitman	Mike Zitzer
2018	Gregg Haese	Jordan Ross	Cody Schroeder	Kyle Frederick	Johnny Whitman	Shaun Bangart
2017	Steven Wirtz	Mike Carter	Vince Engrebretson	John Heinz	Johnny Whitman	Mitch Meier
2016	Kodi Wirtz	Paul Diefenthaler	Travis Arenz	John Heinz	Johnny Whitman	Mitch Meier
2015	Charlie Sancinati	Paul Diefenthaler	Hunter Parsons	Brett Wenzel	Johnny Whitman	Scott Johnson
2014	Kevin Naidl	Shawn Haydon	Brandon Long	Rod Snellenberger	Johnny Whitman	Matt Brehmer
2013	Kevin Naidl	Paul Diefenthaler	Josh Long	John Heinz	Shawn Kilgore	Mike Montie
2012	Don Sorce	Kraig Koehler	Josh Long	John Heinz	Shawn Kilgore	Brian Johnson
2011	TJ Smith	Dan Gracyanly	Troy Jerovetz	Larry Karcz Jr.	Sean Jerovetz	Ralph Legious Jr.
2010	TJ Smith	Ryan Brandes	Johnny Whitman	Rod Snellenberger	Jared Siefert	Sam Ambrosius

== Images ==
2008 Mid-American Stock Cars
Mid-American Stock Car Series racing on 141 Speedway as an asphalt oval — 635 kb

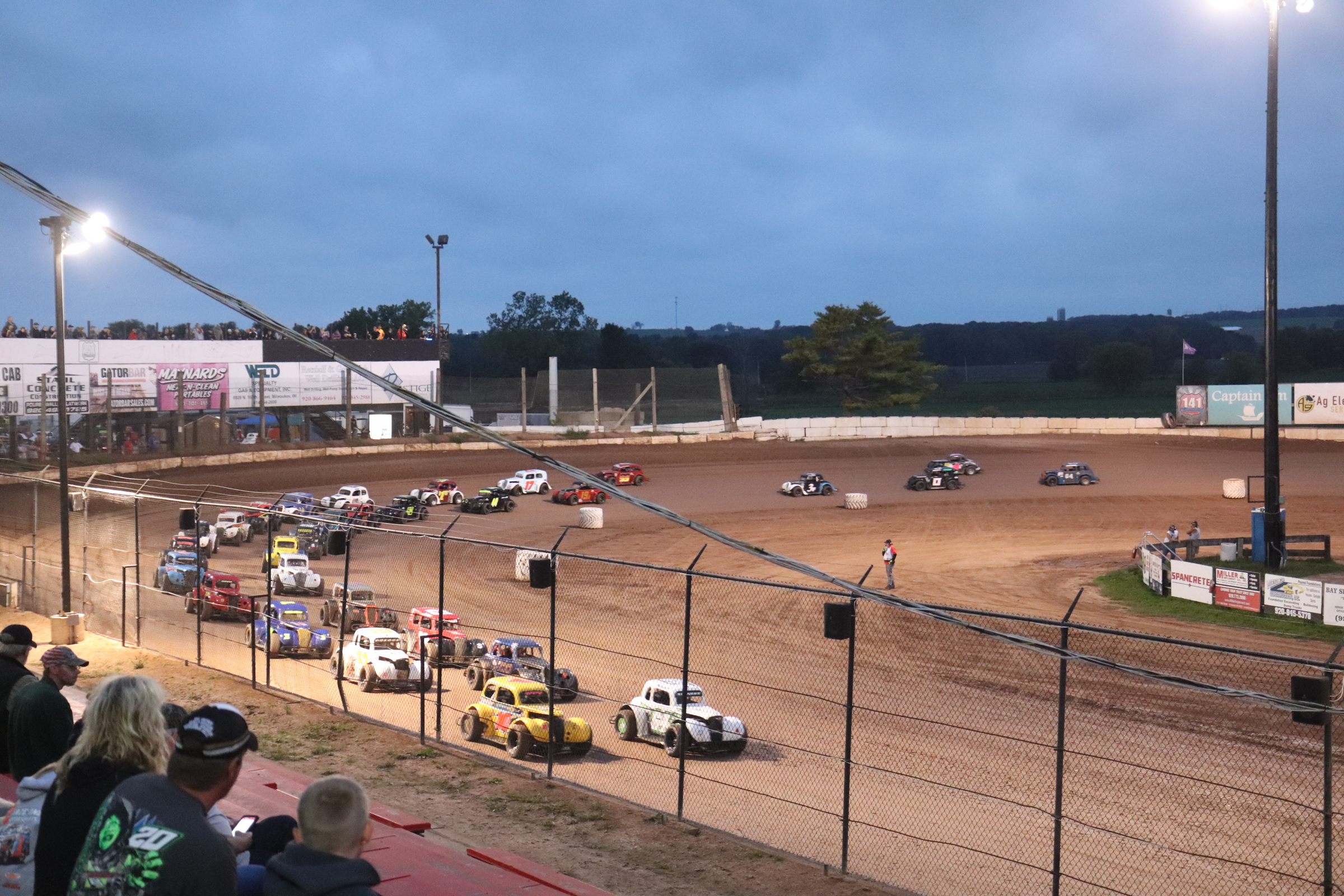
2019 U.S. Dirt Legends Nationals

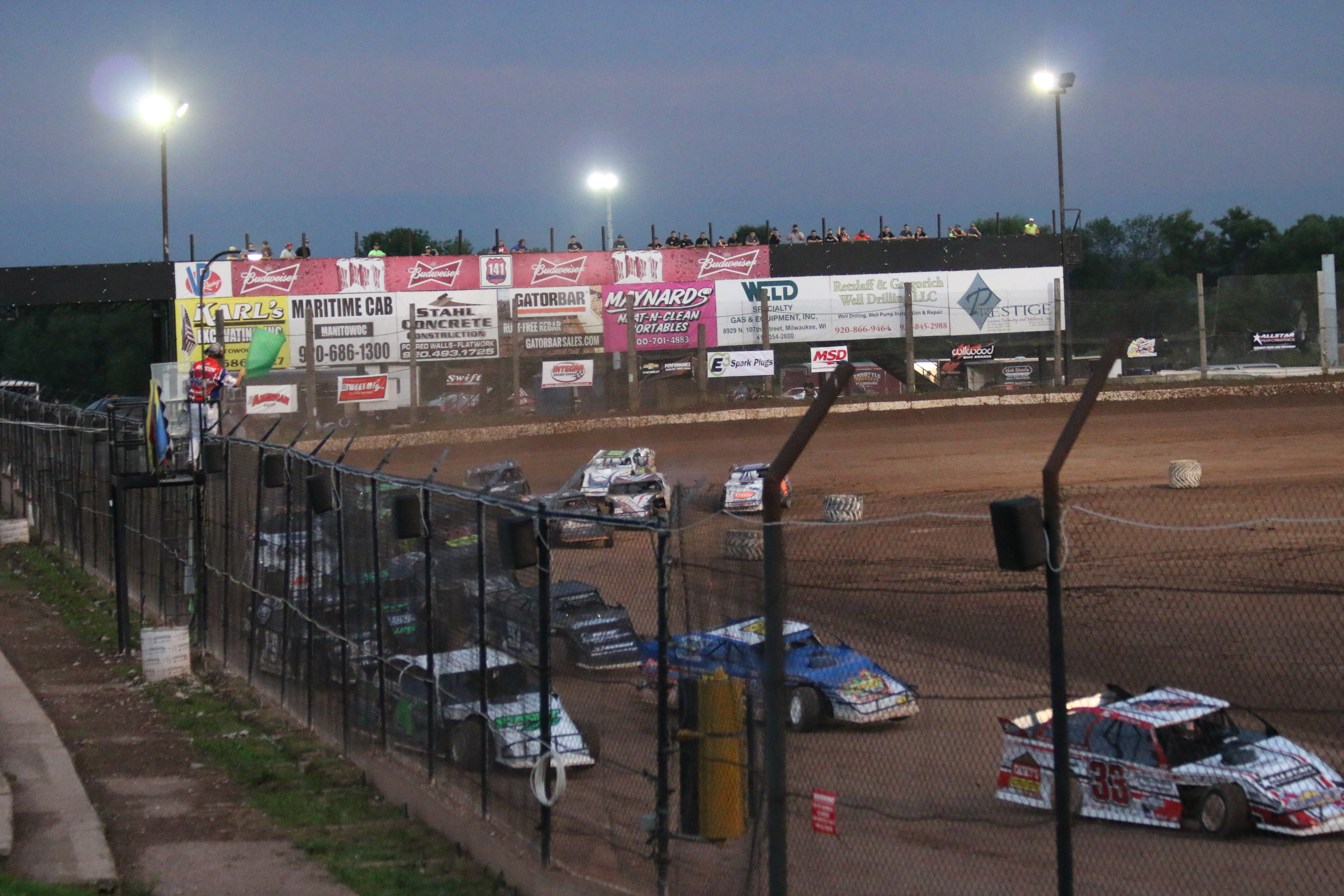
USMTS modifieds race in 2017

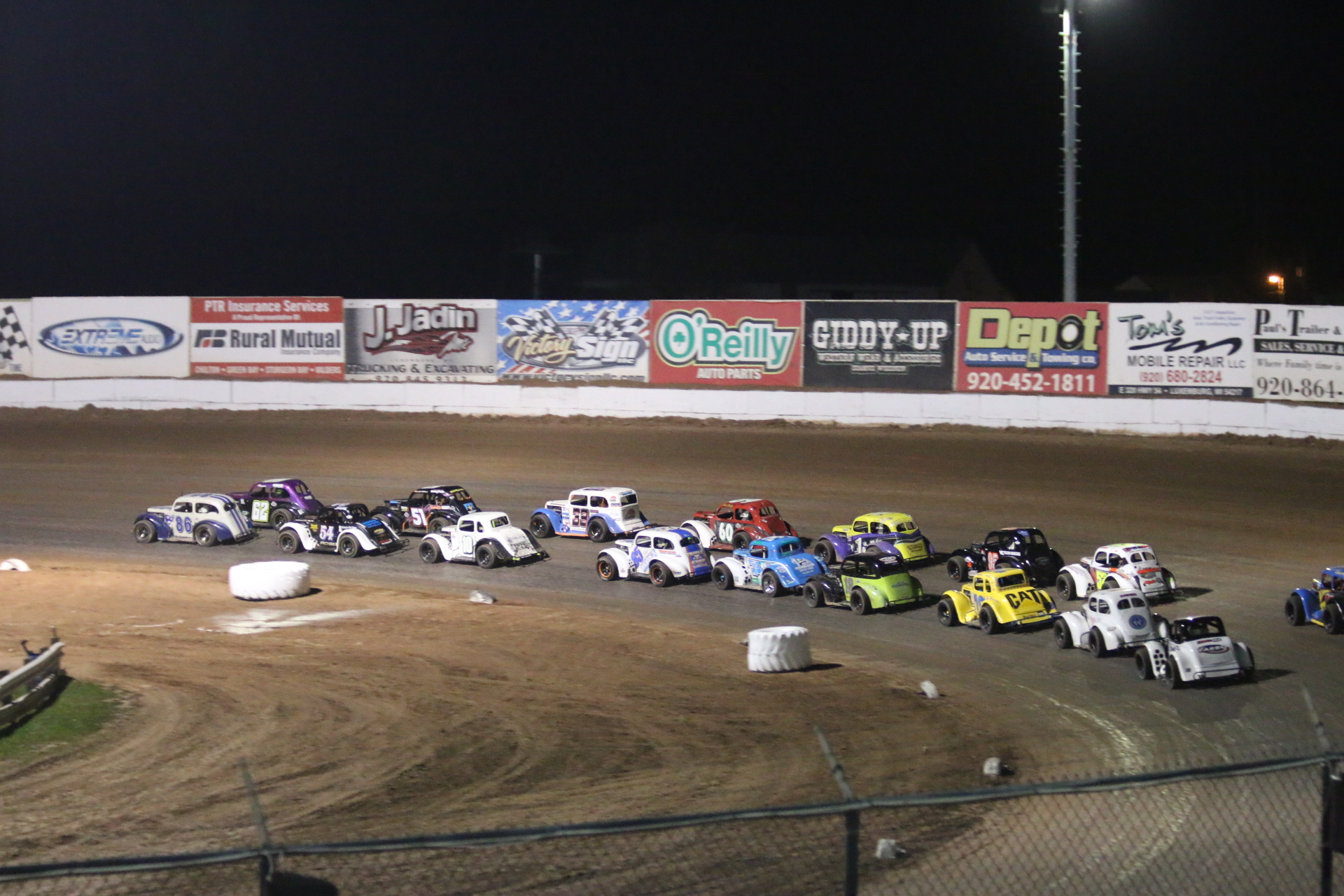
2016 U.S. Dirt Legends Nationals

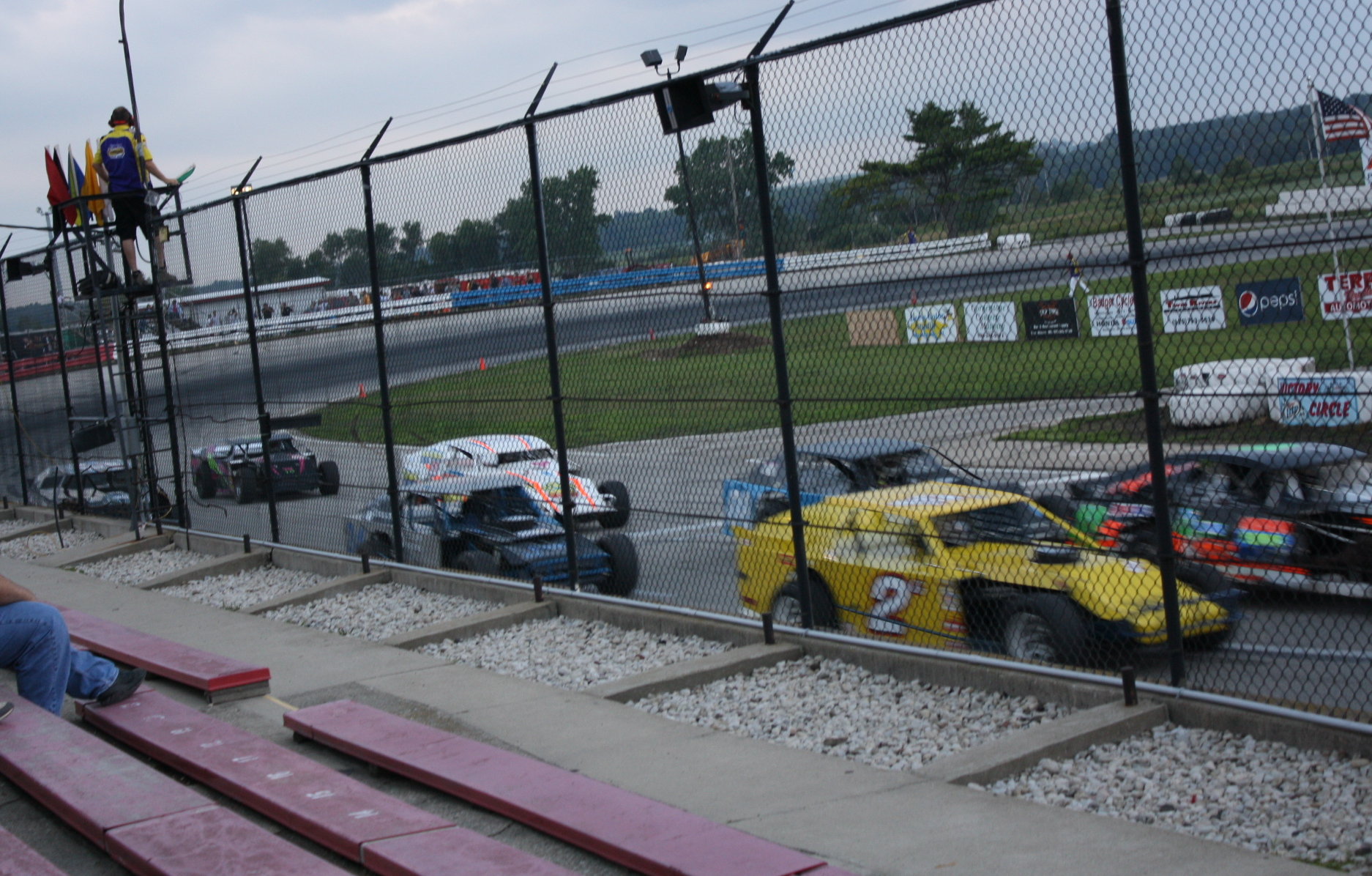
2009 IMCA Sport Modifieds as an asphalt track
