= Mid-Am Racing Series =

Stock car racing series

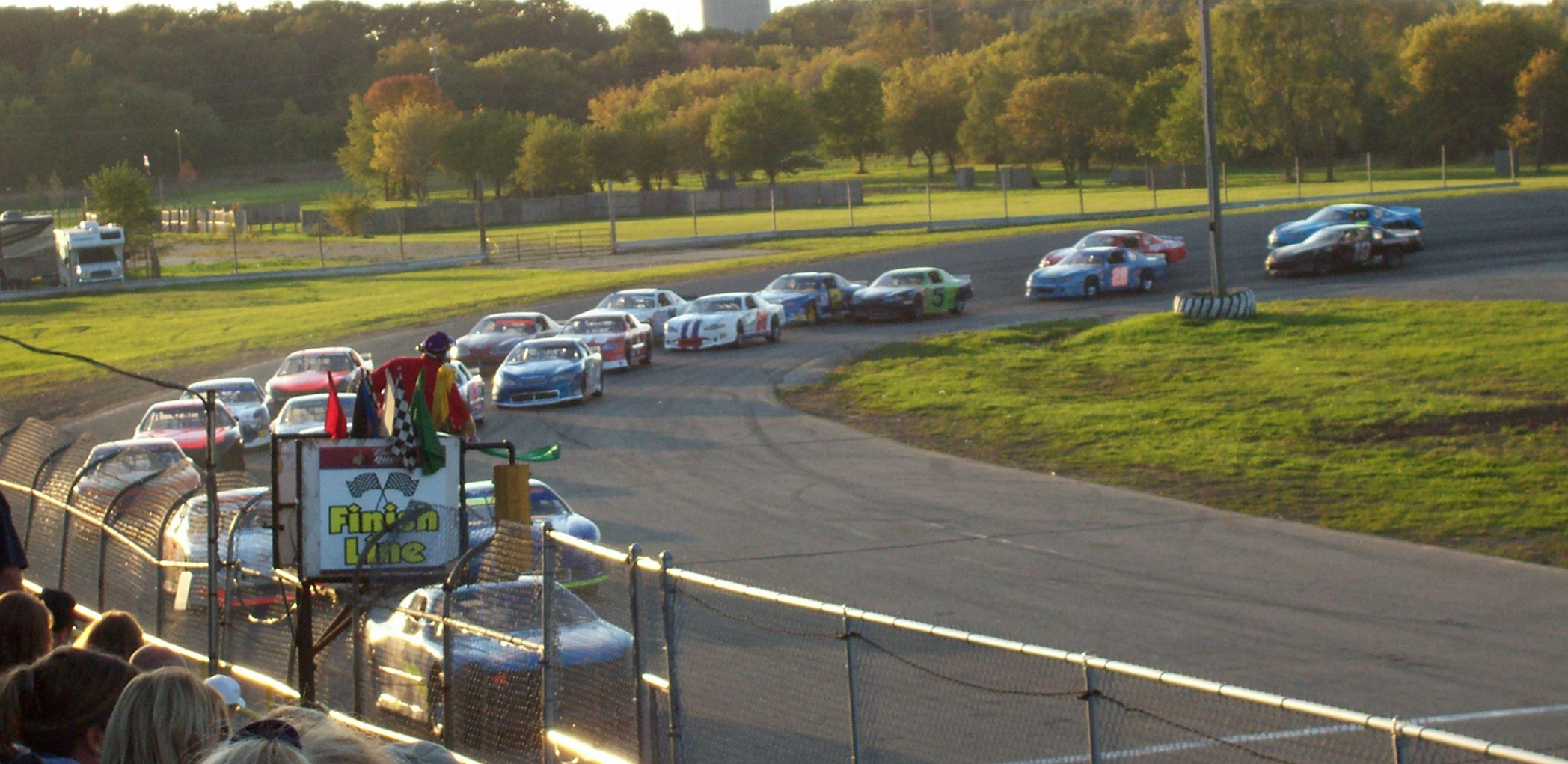
The field of Mid-American Stock Cars take the green flag at Lake Geneva Raceway in 2006

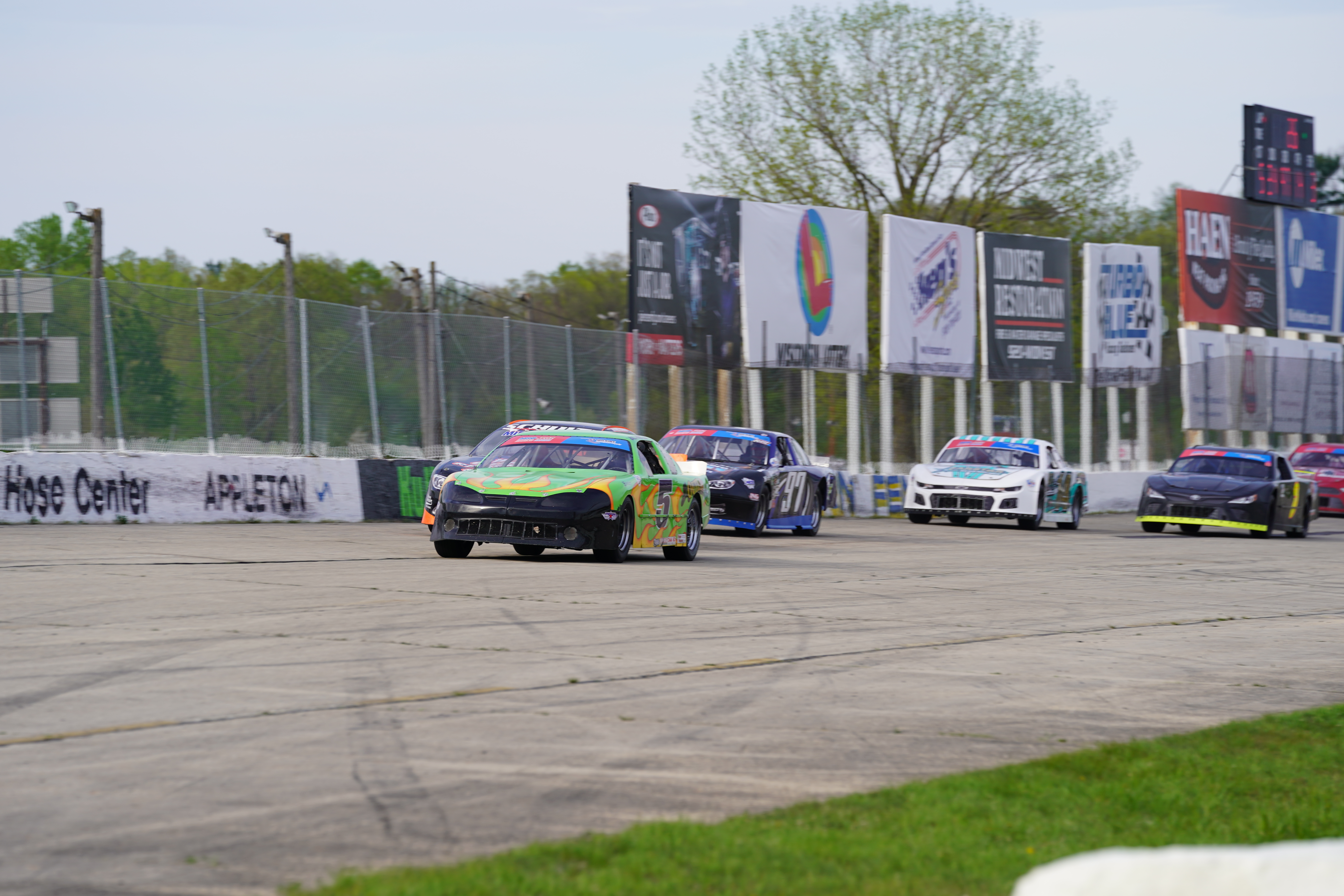
Bill Prietzel, Maxwell Schultz, James Swan, Andrew Meyerhofer, Ron Vandermeir Jr, and Rick Corso at WIR in 2023

Mid-Am Racing Series, formerly Mid American Stock Car Series is a regional stock car racing tour based in the Midwestern United States. Established in 1993, the series features purpose-built race cars that utilize chassis designs influenced by earlier generations of NASCAR Cup Series construction before the Car of Tomorrow era. These cars retain steel tube frames, rear-wheel drive layouts, and naturally aspirated V8 engines.

Cars in the series utilize composite stock car bodies supplied by established manufacturers. These bodies follow a standardized North American short-track design that is also used in other regional and international stock car divisions, including competition in NASCAR Mexico. Body rules promote manufacturer identity—typically Chevrolet, Ford, or Dodge.

The Mid-Am Racing Series competes on a varied schedule that includes paved short tracks, dirt ovals, and road course events across the Midwest, with races in states such as Wisconsin, Illinois, Indiana, and Iowa.

== History ==
The Vercauteren brothers came up with the concept of the asphalt series in Daytona Beach, Florida during Speedweeks in February 1993. “Essentially the idea was to take the concept of the steel-bodied grand national cars that had been so popular on the dirt at Chilton Fairgrounds and create a traveling series on paved tracks throughout the Midwest.”

During the first two years the series ran in ’93 and ’94 the Vercauteren’s were able to secure dates at legendary tracks like the Milwaukee Mile and Road America in Elkhart Lake cementing itself as a formidable racing series. The Series was at one time a support class for the ARTGO Challenge Series. The Mid American corporation expanded to a traveling Supertruck Series named the Midwest Super Truck Series in 1995 and a traveling Super Late Model Series, named the Midwest All-Star Racing Series (MARS) in 1999. The expansion also included the Stock Car Classics in 2004 and the American Stock Car League (ASL) in 2005. The death of Gary Vercauteran in October 2005 led to the purchase of Mid-American by longtime employees Doug and Julie Strasburg. The Strasburgs kept only the Mid American Stock Car Series while MARS and ASL were dissolved. The Stock Car Classics split into two groups (Classic Racing Series and Midwest Stock Car Classics). The Super Trucks were absorbed into the United States Super Trucks or USST.

== Strasburg ownership era ==
When the Strasburgs took over Mid American in 2006, the series was struggling with car counts and tracks willing to host races. The average car count average jumped from 20 entrants per race to 27, peaking at39 participants at the Milwaukee Mile during Governor's Cup Weekend. Several tracks have renewed relationships with the Mid-American Stock Car Series such as the Golden Sands Speedway, Marshfield Super Speedway, Dells Raceway Park and Road America.

== Gruenberg ownership era ==
Dave Gruenberg took over ownership on October 22, 2014. Gruenberg revealed a 2017 schedule that would have teams competing on consecutive days at very different venues. For example, on Thursday, May 25 a race was held on the 1 mile dirt oval of the Indiana State Fairgroundsan, and less than 24 hours later on May 26, teams took to the track 21 miles to the west, for 40 laps on the pavement at the fast 5/8-mile Lucas Oil Raceway in Brownsburg, Indiana.

== Go Racing Promotions ownership era ==
The series was sold by Gruenberg to former La Crosse Fairgrounds Speedway flagman Greg Oliver in early February 2017. Oliver ran both the Great Northern Sportsmen Series and Midwest Dash Series. All three series became a part of the GO Racing Promotions organization.

== Scrogham/Hryn ownership era ==
In early October 2020, the series was purchased by former competitor Tim Scrogham from longtime owner Greg Oliver and rebranded as the Mid-Am Racing Series. In 2025, Scrogham added fellow former competitor Cheryl Hryn as a co-owner. Under their leadership, the series underwent significant modernization. Scrogham introduced greater transparency, standardized procedures, improved race-day operations, expanded the series' digital infrastructure, implemented virtual town hall meetings with competitors, and streamlined administrative and event workflows. Hryn played a key role in strengthening driver communication and competitor relations, helping improve engagement throughout the field.

== Nelms ownership era ==
In July 2026, Josh and Kerrie Nelms acquired the Mid-Am Racing Series through Instinct Promotions LLC from Tim Scrogham and Cheryl Hryn. The new ownership retained much of the series' leadership and operational staff, emphasizing continuity while continuing the series' mission of providing affordable, competitive touring stock car racing throughout the Midwest.

== Notable Drivers ==
- Ken Schrader - Former ARCA Menards Series, NASCAR Cup Series, NASCAR Xfinity Series, and NASCAR Camping World Truck Series driver. Most recently driving for the Superstar Racing Experience. Ken also owns/drivers a dirt late model and dirt open-wheel modified car.
- Joey Gase - Former Sprint Cup Series, American Speed Association, ARCA Racing Series, USAR Pro Cup Series, and NASCAR K&N Pro Series East driver. Joey now competes part-time in the NASCAR Xfinity Series.
- Bill Prietzel - dirt late models, SCCA, NASCAR Nationwide Series Driver
- Ron Vandermeir Jr - ARCA Menards Series Driver and 5 time Series Champion
- James Swan - 35 year veteran of Midwest racing.
- Eddie Hoffman - 1998 ARTGO Champion, multiple Super Late Model Track Championships in the Chicago area
- Brett Sontag - 2004 American Speed Association National Tour Rookie of the Year, 5-time track champion
- Peter "Speedy" Hernandez - 2006 NASCAR Drive for Diversity Driver of the Year
- Paige Decker - NASCAR Camping World Truck Series and Xfinity Series and was a 2014 NASCAR Drive for Diversity participant.
- Claire Decker - 2014 participant in the NASCAR Drive for Diversity.
- Stephen Cox - driver in the World Racing League endurance sports car series, CRS Super Truck Series and Grid Life

== Tracks ==
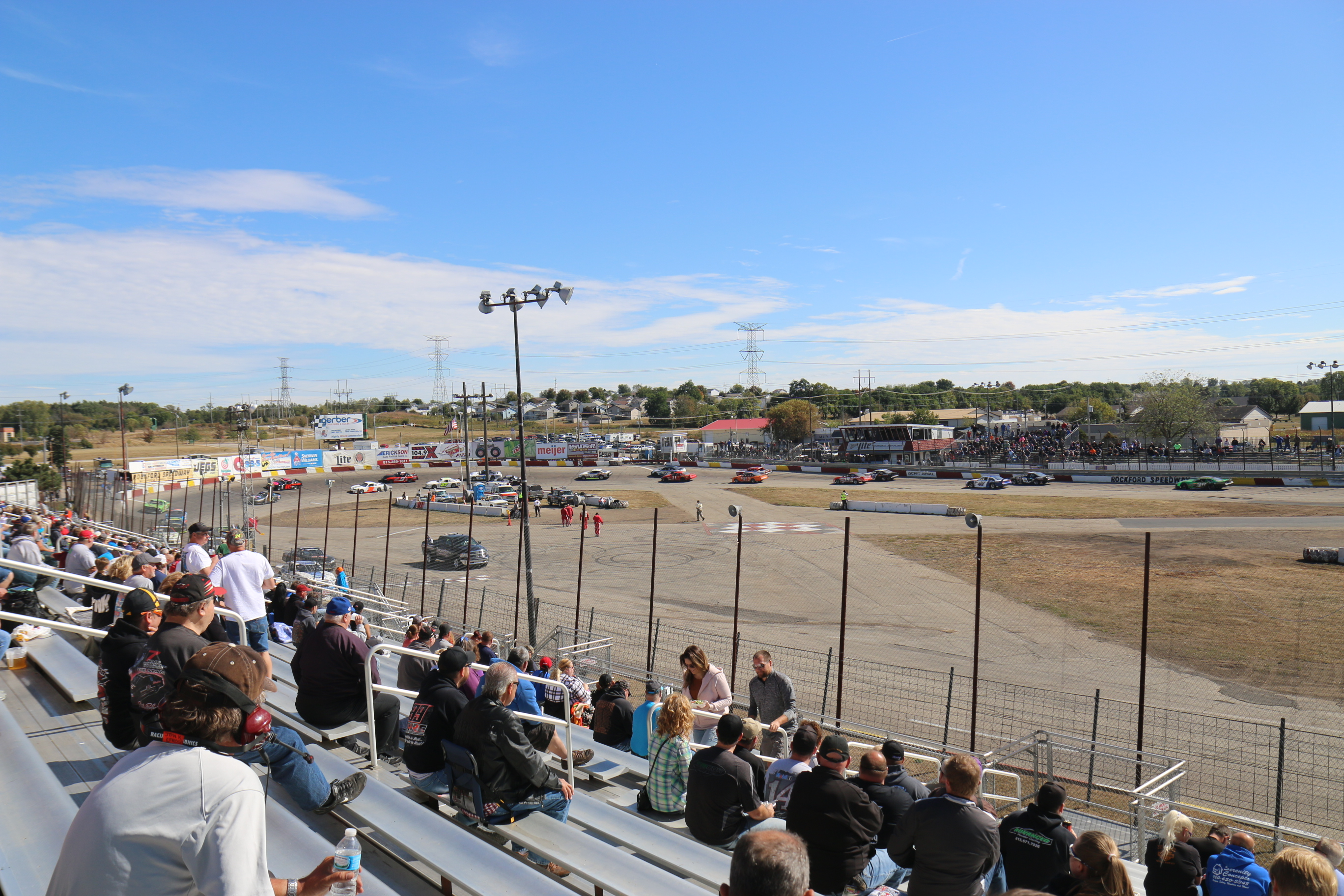
Mid American Stock Car Series cars at Rockford Speedway in 2017

The following tracks are scheduled to host at least one event in 2026:

- Wisconsin International Raceway
- Hawkeye Downs Speedway
- Norway Speedway
- Lucas Oil Raceway at Indianapolis
- Winchester Speedway
- Slinger Speedway
- La Crosse Fairgrounds Speedway
- Dells Raceway Park
- Grundy County Speedway (two events)
- Plymouth Motor Speedway

=== Former tracks ===
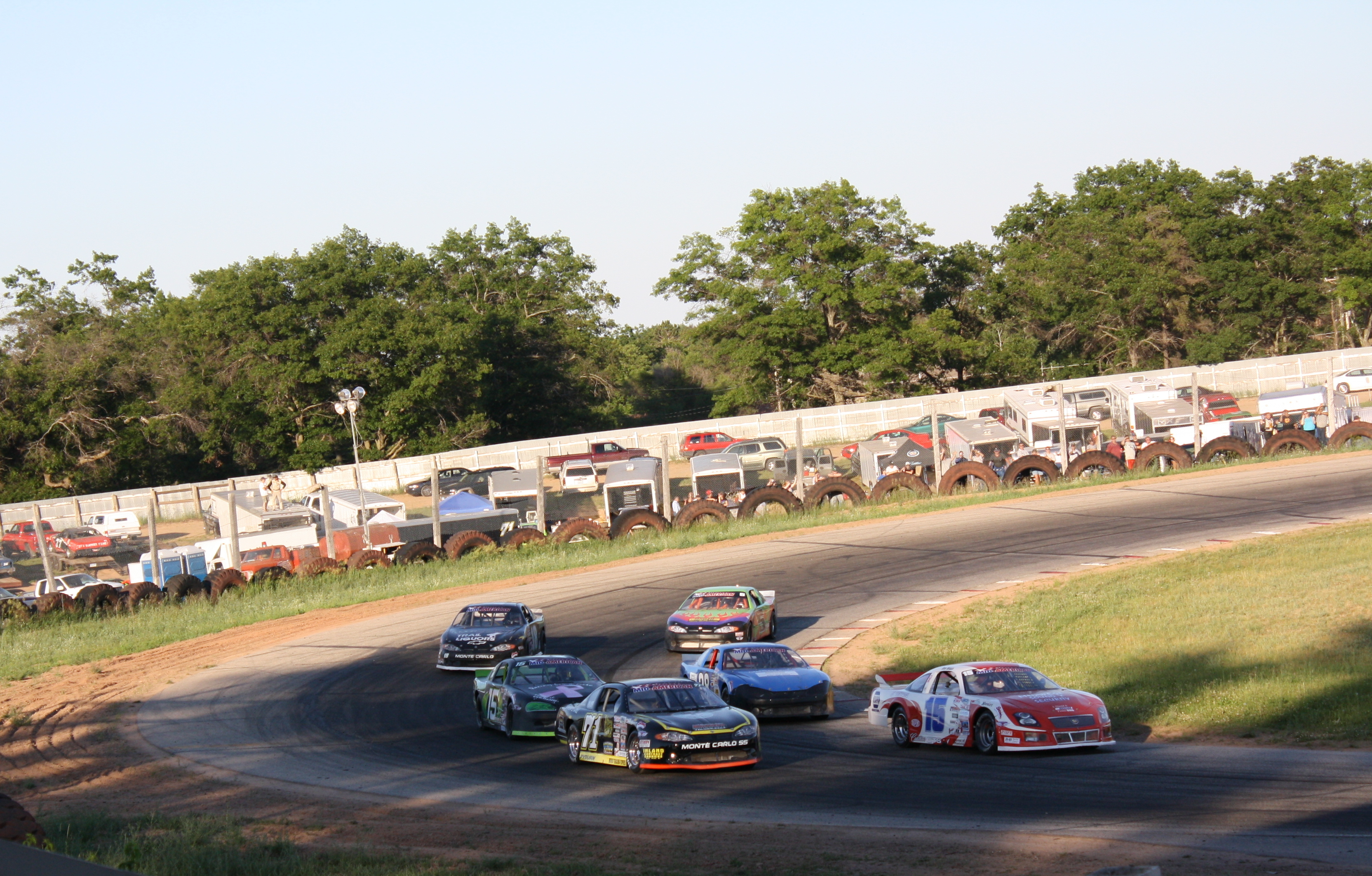
Norway Speedway in 2009

- Madison International Speedway
- Kankakee County Speedway (dirt oval)
- Sycamore Speedway (dirt oval)
- Tomah-Sparta Raceway
- Milwaukee Mile
- Rockford Speedway (track closed after 2023 season)
- Chicago Motor Speedway
- 141 Speedway – Francis Creek, Wisconsin (later became a dirt track)
- Dodge County (WI) Fairgrounds (dirt exhibition)
- Elko Speedway - Elko New Market, Minnesota
- Blackhawk Farms Raceway
- Illiana Motor Speedway
- Golden Sands Speedway
- Indiana State Fairgrounds
- Lake Geneva Raceway – Lake Geneva, Wisconsin (track closed after 2006 season)
- Marshfield Motor Speedway
- Michigan Ideal Speedway
- Road America – Elkhart Lake, Wisconsin
- South Bend Speedway
- State Park Speedway
- Beaver Dam Raceway (dirt oval 2021)

Super Truck Series Race ONLY:

- Raceway Park

== List of series champions ==
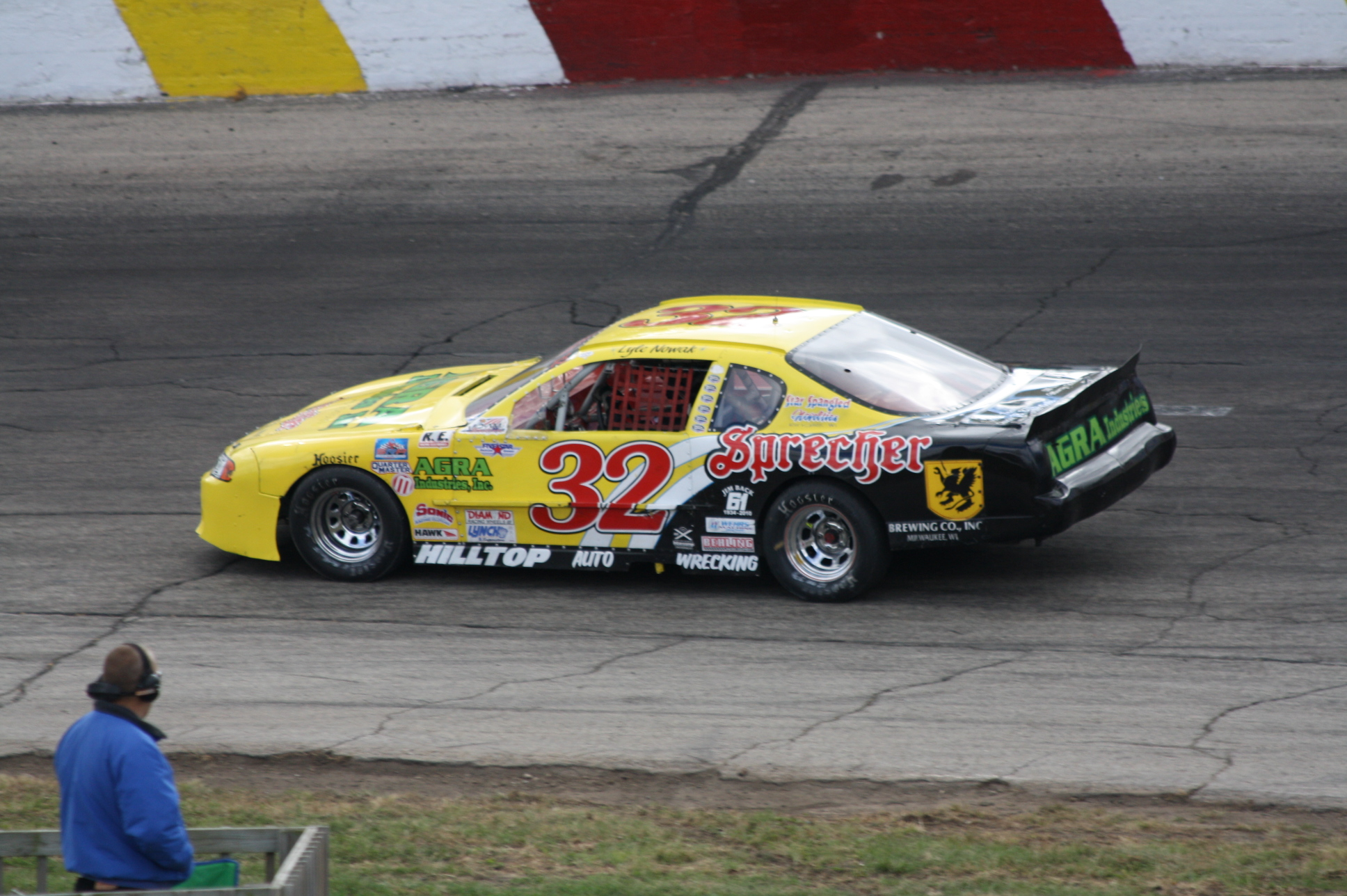
2010 series champion Lyle Nowak at Rockford Speedway

Year	Driver	References
1993	Eddie Hoffman	
1994	Eddie Hoffman	
1995	Eddie Hoffman	
1996	Mark Pluer	
1997	Jeff Storm	
1998	Jeff Storm	
1999	Rick Corso	
2000	Bill Prietzel	
2001	James Swan	
2002	Rod Brewe	
2003	Bill Prietzel	
2004	Peter Hernandez	
2005	Bill Prietzel	
2006	James Swan	
2007	James Swan	
2008	James Swan	
2009	Paul Neisius	
2010	Lyle Nowak	
2011	James Swan	
2012	Jeremy Spoonmore	
2013	Brad Keith	
2014	Jeff Holtz	
2015	Jeff Holtz	
2016	Ryan Gutknecht	
2017	Dan Glister	
2018	Ron Vandermeir Jr.	
2019	Ron Vandermeir Jr.	
2020	Ron Vandermeir Jr.	
2021	Ron Vandermeir Jr.	
2022	Ron Vandermeir Jr.	
2023	Clayton Curts	
2024	Scotty Gardner, Jr.	
2025	Scotty Gardner, Jr.	

== List of Vercauteran Memorial winners ==
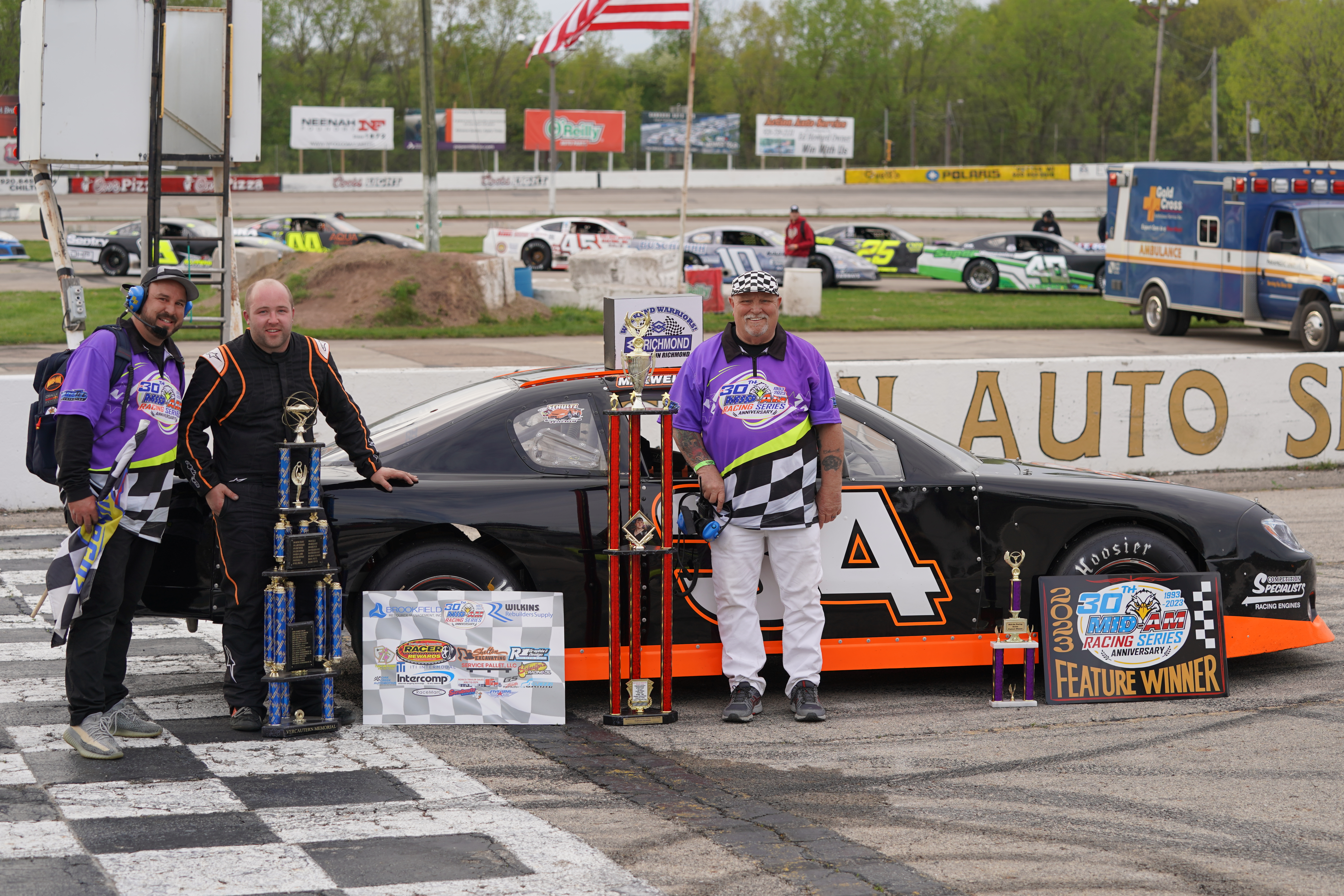
Maxwell Schultz Vercauteran memorial winner in victory lane at WIR 2023

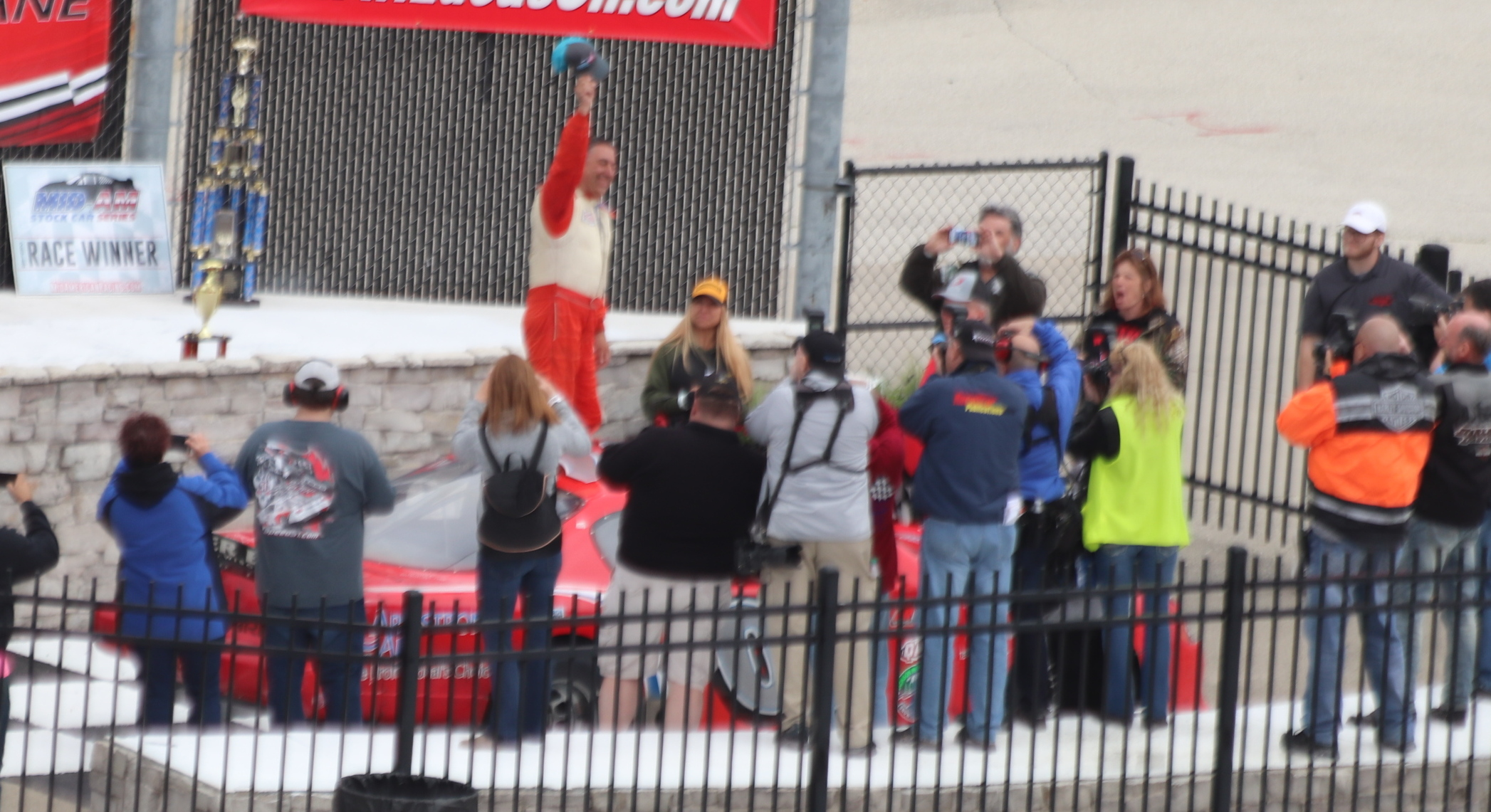
Ron Weyer in victory lane at Milwaukee in 2019

The series honors its founder Gary Vercauteran with a race each year after beginning as an event honoring his parents. The race was often held as part of the Red, White, and Blue state championship event at Wisconsin International Raceway (WIR). The 2007 event at WIR was rained out, so it was held at 141 Speedway which is the track next closed to Vercauteran's hometown Chilton. The 2010 event was held at Road America. It began in Vercauteran's hometown dirt track in Chilton Fairgrounds before the series' origin. It has been held at a variety of tracks since then. The 25th annual Vercauteran Memorial winner returned to WIR and was won by Tyler Bauknecht (whose family had traveled with the Vercauteran family in the early days of the series).

- 1990 Wayne Strand (Chilton Fairgrounds)
- 1991 Larry Richards (Chilton Fairgrounds)
- 1992 Jerry Wenzel (Chilton Fairgrounds)
- 1993 Eddie Hoffman (Wisconsin International Raceway)
- 1994 Brian Lambie (Wisconsin International Raceway)
- 1995 Eddie Hoffman (Wisconsin International Raceway)
- 1996 Pat Kelly (Wisconsin International Raceway)
- 1997 Bill Prietzel (Wisconsin International Raceway)
- 1998 Pat Kelly (Wisconsin International Raceway)
- 1999 Gregg Haese (Wisconsin International Raceway)
- 2000 Mark Pluer (Wisconsin International Raceway)
- 2001 Peter Hernandez (Wisconsin International Raceway)
- 2002 Peter Hernandez (Wisconsin International Raceway)
- 2003 Jeremy Spoonmore (Wisconsin International Raceway)
- 2004 Bill Prietzel (Wisconsin International Raceway)
- 2005 Brett Piontek (Wisconsin International Raceway)
- 2006 James Swan (Wisconsin International Raceway)
- 2007 Kevin Damrow (141 Speedway)
- 2008 Jacob Finney (Wisconsin International Raceway)
- 2009 Gregg Haese (141 Speedway)
- 2010 Bill Prietzel (Road America)
- 2011 Jacob Finney (Norway Speedway)
- 2012 Kenny Joosten (Rockford Speedway)
- 2013 James Swan (Rockford Speedway)
- 2014 Tyler Bauknecht (Wisconsin International Raceway)
- 2015 Lyle Nowak (State Park Speedway)
- 2016 Ron Vandemeier, Jr. (Rockford Speedway)--51st National Short Track Championships
- 2019 Ron Weyer (Milwaukee Mile)
- 2020 Rick Corso (Rockford Speedway)--55th National Short Track Championships
- 2021 Ron Vandemeier, Jr. (Rockford Speedway)--56th National Short Track Championships
- 2022 James Swan (Rockford Speedway)--57th National Short Track Championships
- 2023 Maxwell Schultz (Wisconsin International Raceway)
- 2024 Kenny Richards (Wisconsin International Raceway)
- 2025 Scotty Gardner Jr. (Madison International Speedway)

== Other divisions ==
=== Mid-American Super Trucks champions ===
- 1997 Terry Marzokfa
- 1998 Terry Marzofka
- 1999 Gordon Swanson
- 2000 Danny Heinritz
- 2001 Jerry Seibel
- 2002 Jeff Steenbergen
- 2003 Donnie Woller
- 2004 Jamie Farrell
- 2005 Mark Storlie

=== MARS late model champions ===
- 1999 Lowell Bennett
- 2000 Lowell Bennett
- 2001 Todd Kluever
- 2002 Terry Baldry
- 2003 Jeff Van Oudenhoven
- 2004 Jeff Van Oudenhoven
- 2005 Jeff Van Oudenhoven

=== Midwest Stock Car Classics champions ===
- 2003 Chuck King
- 2004 Gary Stein
- 2005 John Vassh Jr.
