= Bill Prietzel =

American racing driver

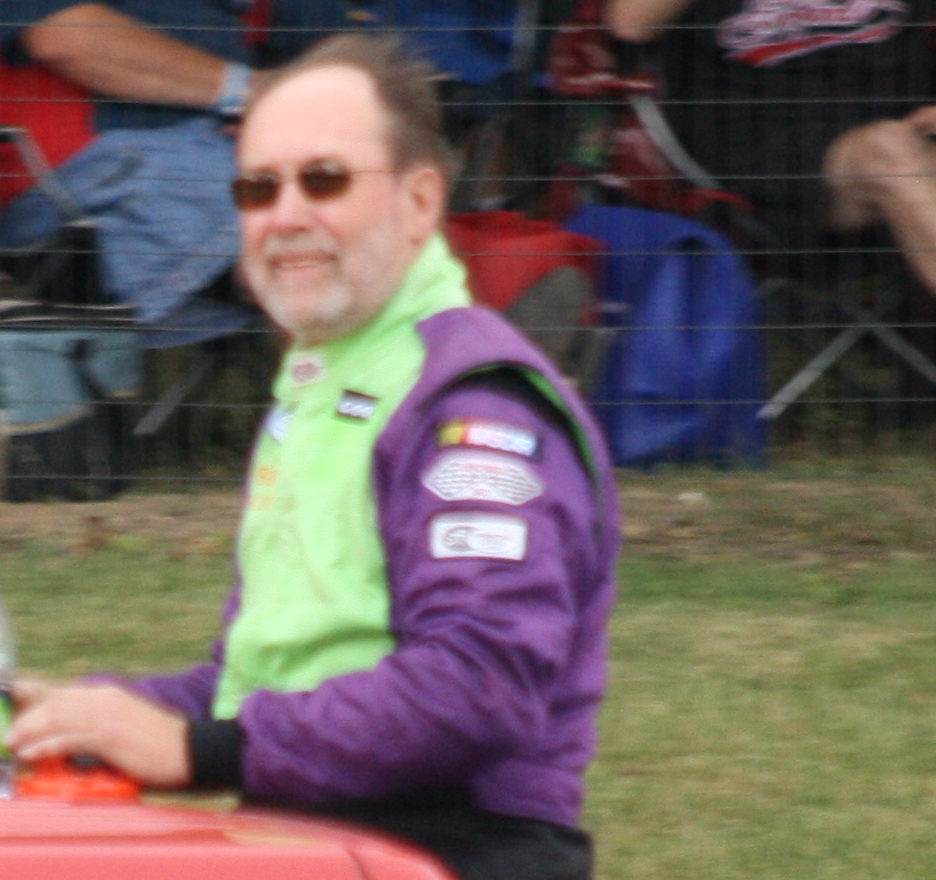
- Prietzel at his 2012 Nationwide start at Road America
- Born: William Prietzel; September 8, 1952 (age 74)
- Achievements: Mid-American Stock Car Series champion (2000, 2003, 2005)
- Awards: Southeastern Wisconsin Racing Hall of Fame inductee (2015)

NASCAR O'Reilly Auto Parts Series career
- 1 race run over 1 year
- 2012 position: 84th
- Best finish: 84th (2012)
- First race: 2012 Sargento 200 (Road America)
Wins	Top tens	Poles
0	0	0
- Statistics up to date as of March 26, 2020.

William Prietzel (born September 8, 1952) is an American racing driver from Richfield, Wisconsin. He has raced in dirt late models, the Mid-American Stock Car Series, SCCA, and had one NASCAR Nationwide Series start in 2012. He is nicknamed the "Franklin Flyer" as he lived in Franklin, Wisconsin during his dirt track racing days.

== Racing career ==
=== Dirt racing ===
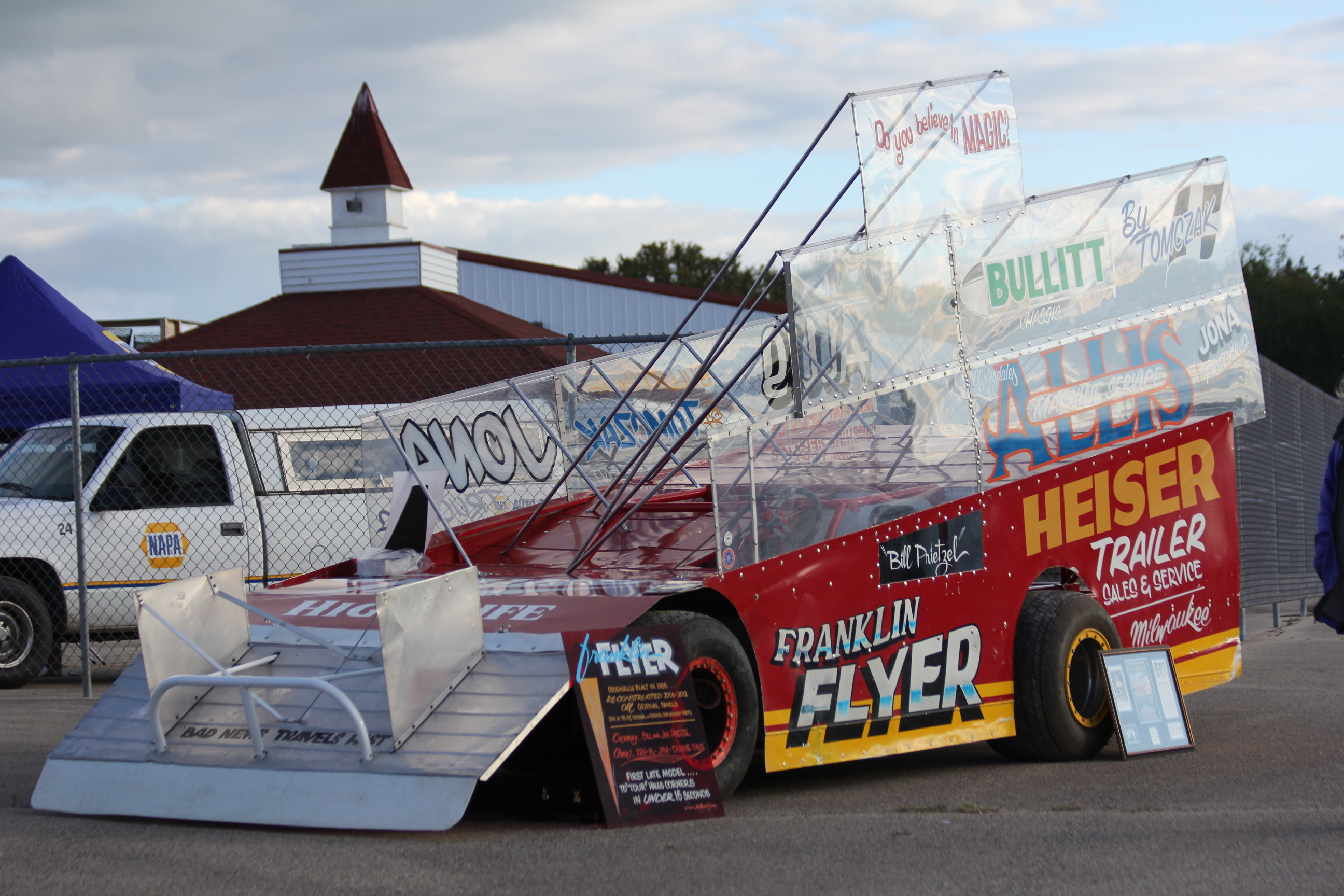
Prietzel's "Franklin Flyer" dirt late model

Prietzel began racing in 1973, primarily on dirt tracks. His most well-known dirt track accomplishment was winning the 1977 sportsman track championship at Hales Corners Speedway. He built a late model for an open rules show that was nicknamed the Franklin Flyer; the car featured large wings and it set the track record at Hales Corners.

=== Asphalt stock cars and Mid American series ===
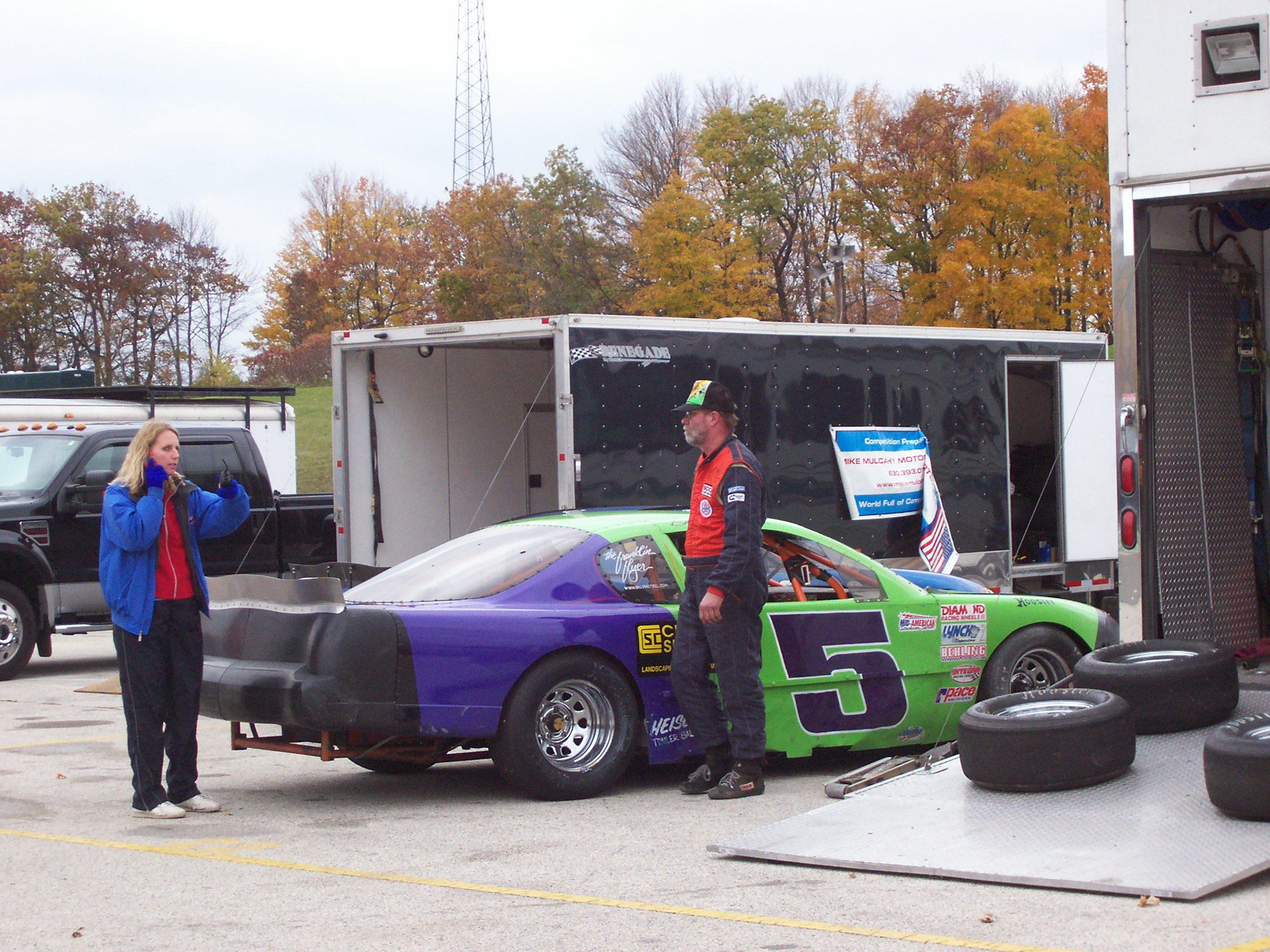
2008 Mid American car at Road America

Prietzel felt that his car was becoming outdated by the early 1990s, so he began tour racing on the asphalt in Mid-American Stock Car Series in 1993. In a 2015 interview in Hot Rod magazine, he quoted as saying "The Mid-Am deal looked like an affordable way to go to a bunch of race tracks and have fun." Prietel ended up with three Mid American titles (2000, 2003, and 2005). In the 2008 Road America Mid American race, he spun out entering the first turn on the first lap and nearly fell down an entire lap in a twelve lap race. Prietzel caught up the entire 4 miles of the circuit under caution and passed the entire field to win the race. He occasionally runs in an Area Sportsman car at Slinger Super Speedway in the 2010s.

=== Sports car racing ===
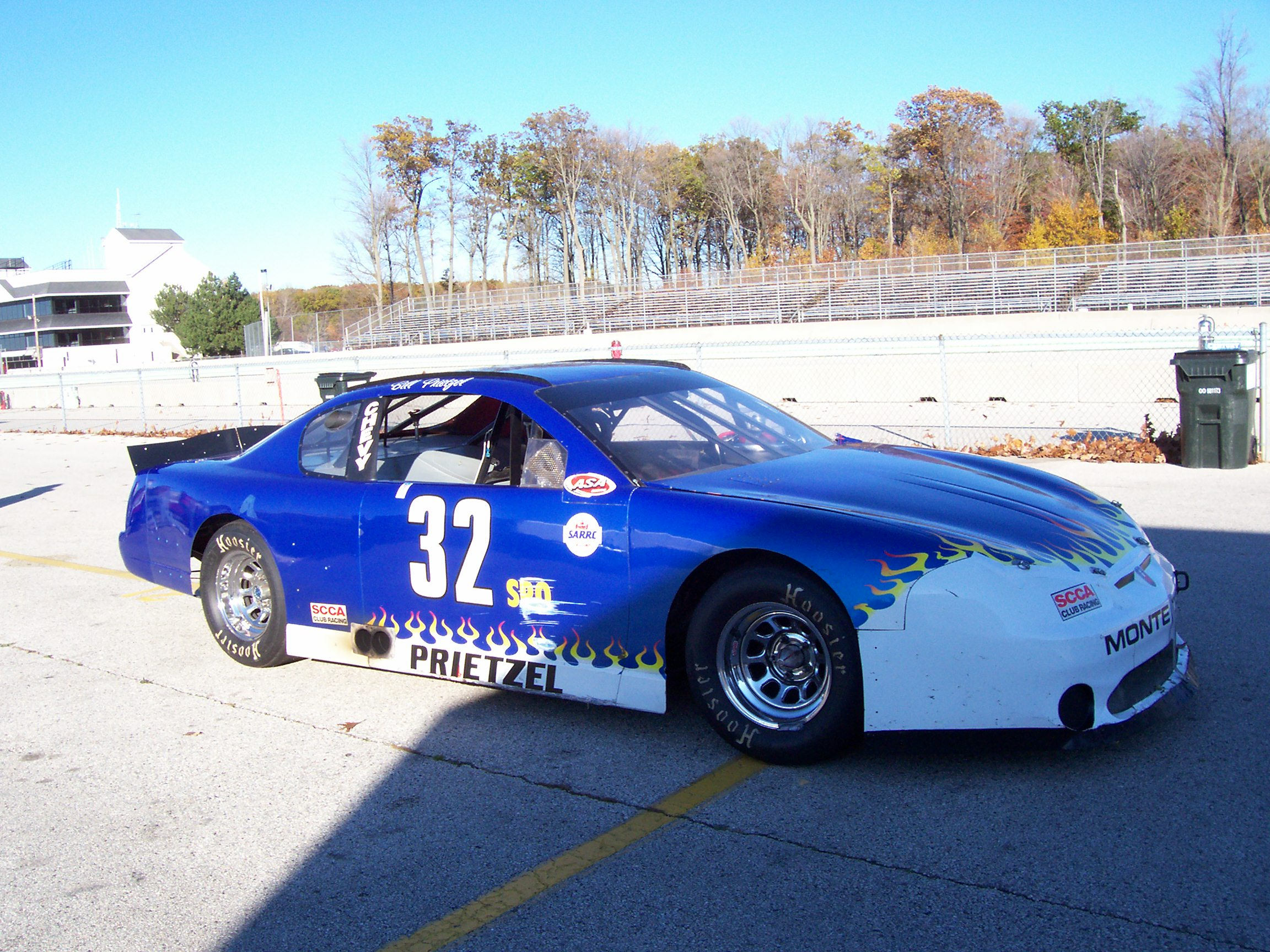
Pritzel's #32 sports car in 2007

Prietzel raced in the Trans-Am 2 (TA2) class of the Sports Car Club of America (SCCA) when it began being awarded points in 2011. He began the season with a second-place finish at Sebring International Raceway. Prietzel finished second in the final 2011 season points. He had two more TA2 starts in 2012 and another in 2013. He won an SCCA race in Texas as well as Daytona International Speedway in 2006.

=== NASCAR start ===
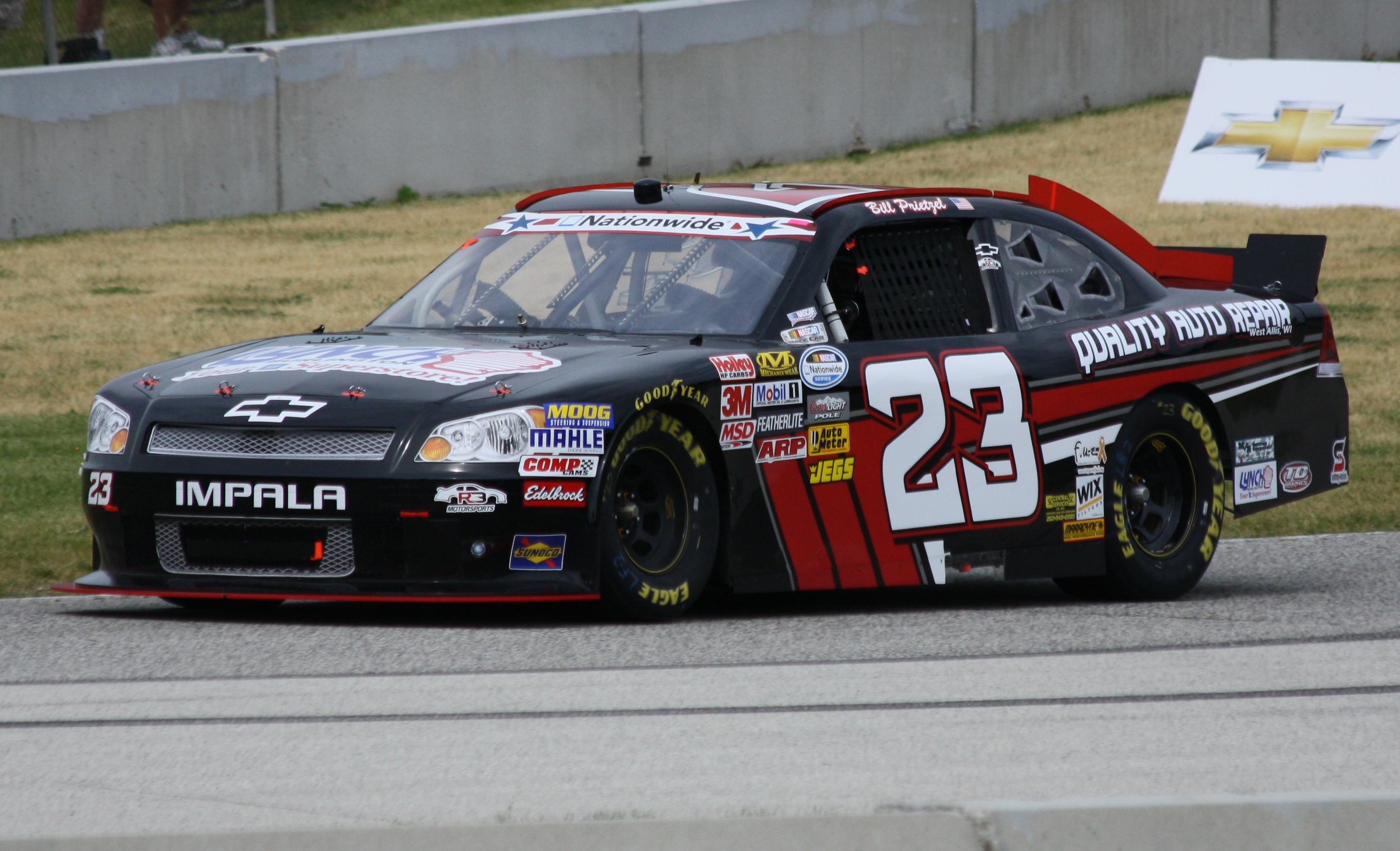
Prietzel racing at Road America during his 2012 Nationwide Series start

Prietzel made his first (and to-date only) NASCAR start in 2012 on the Road America road course, which was less than five miles (eight kilometers) from his hometown of Plymouth, Wisconsin. He completed the entire race in the No. 23 entry for R3 Motorsports and finished 27th. Prietzel was quoted in a May 2015 edition of Full Throttle magazine and described being in that race as "Without a doubt the neatest thing I ever did in racing. We wanted to qualify on time, race all day and finish and we did all of that."

== Personal life ==
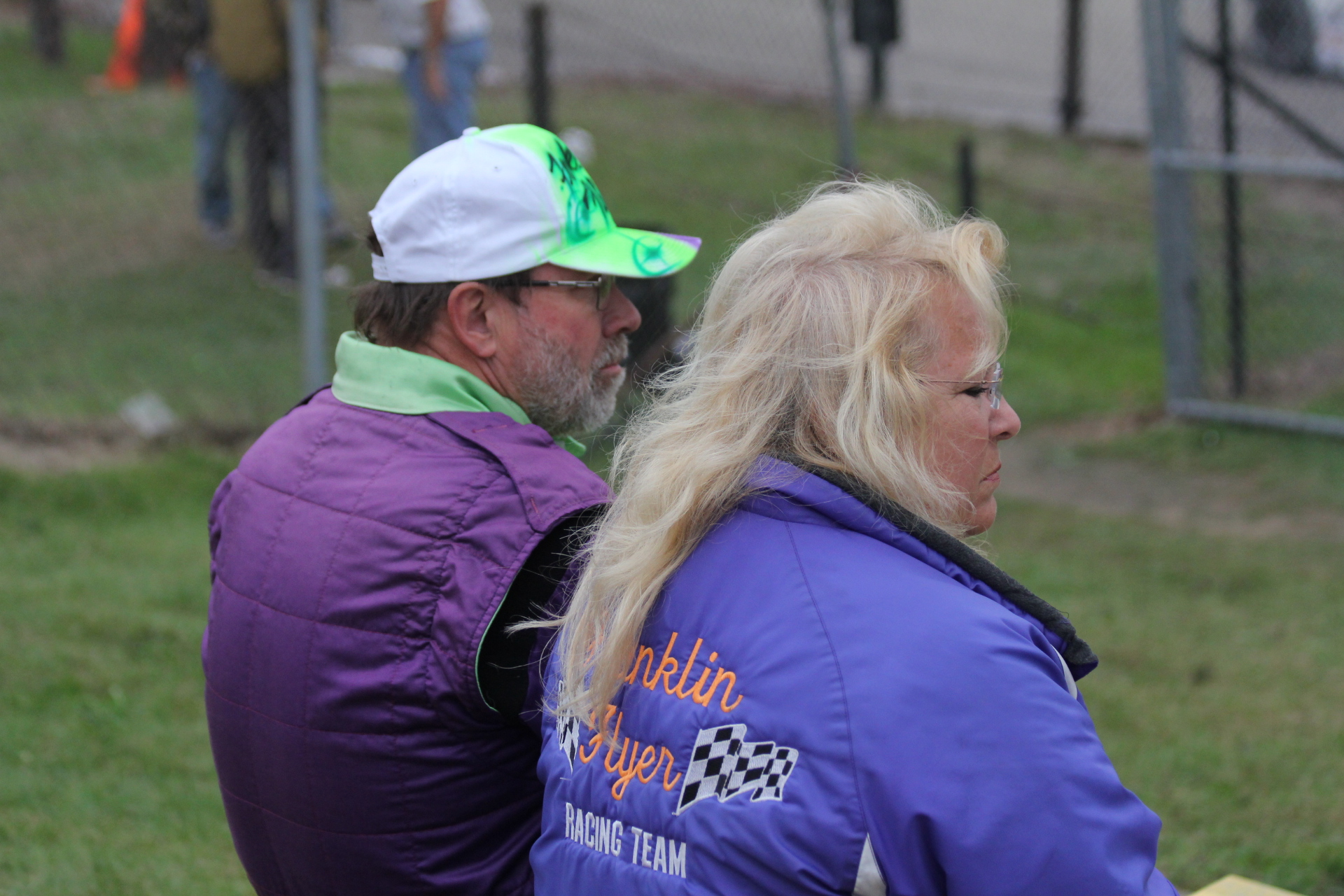
Prietzel with his wife Jan watching the races at La Crosse

Prietzel and his wife Jan run their racing program. He owned Prietzel's Quality Auto in West Allis, Wisconsin.

== Awards ==
In 2015, Prietzel was inducted in the Southeastern Wisconsin Short Track Hall of Fame. The Hall of Fame cited his Hales Corner Speedway championship, participation at several area dirt tracks in Sportsman and Late Model cars, Mid American championships, and racing in NASCAR / SCCA.

== Motorsports career results ==
=== NASCAR ===
(key) (Bold – Pole position awarded by qualifying time. Italics – Pole position earned by points standings or practice time. * – Most laps led.)

==== Nationwide Series ====
NASCAR Nationwide Series results
Year	Team	No.	Make	1	2	3	4	5	6	7	8	9	10	11	12	13	14	15	16	17	18	19	20	21	22	23	24	25	26	27	28	29	30	31	32	33	NNSC	Pts	Ref
2012	R3 Motorsports	23	Chevy	DAY	PHO	LVS	BRI	CAL	TEX	RCH	TAL	DAR	IOW	CLT	DOV	MCH	ROA; 27	KEN	DAY	NHA	CHI	IND	IOW	GLN	CGV	BRI	ATL	RCH	CHI	KEN	DOV	CLT	KAN	TEX	PHO	HOM	84th	17	
