= American Iron Racing =

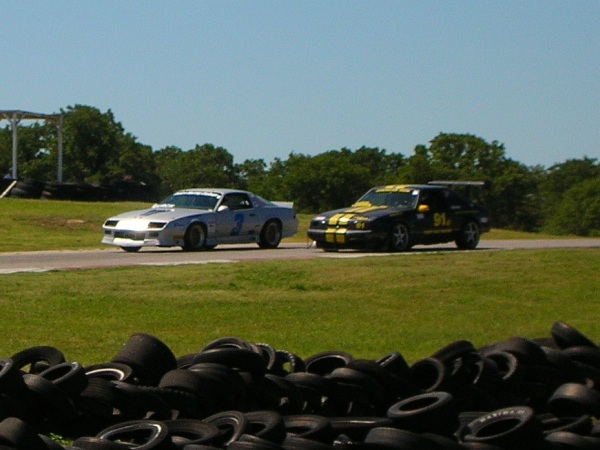
CMC and AI cars racing in Texas.

American Iron is a group of North American road racing classes sanctioned by the National Auto Sport Association (NASA).

American Iron racing features domestic muscle or pony cars such as Ford Mustang, Chevrolet Camaro, and Pontiac Firebird in four classes, Camaro Mustang Challenge (CMC & CMC-II), American Iron (AI), and American Iron Extreme (AIX). It has large, closely contested fields of V8 powered cars.

The different classes reflect various levels of permitted modifications, from the near showroom stock entry level Camaro Mustang Challenge (CMC) class, through to the "almost anything goes" American Iron Extreme (AIX) class at the opposite end of the scale. CMC, CMC-II, and AI classes have a power to weight limitation, while AIX is unrestricted.

The minimum weight for an American Iron race car is 2,700 pounds with driver included. The AI class has a maximum power-to-weight ratio of 9.5:1 (9.5 lbs of vehicle weight per horsepower) and a maximum torque to weight ratio of 9:1 (9 pounds of vehicle weight per each foot-pound). Both are measured at the rear wheels. These formulas are designed to allow differences in vehicle handling and power while equalizing the competition and keeping race team budgets low by penalizing excessive power.

American Iron races are run at all NASA regional events, as well as the annual National Championships currently held each year in September at Miller Motorsports Park in Tooele, Utah. Previously, the championships were held at Mid-Ohio Sports Car Course.
