= National Auto Sport Association =

American motorsports organization

- Sport: Road racing Rallying; Autocross
- Jurisdiction: United States
- Abbreviation: NASA
- Founded: 1991
- Headquarters: Las Vegas, Nevada

Official website
- drivenasa.com
- (United States)

Previous logo (2005–2019)

The National Auto Sport Association (NASA) is an American motorsports organization promoting road racing and high-performance driver education.

Founded in 1991, NASA hosts High Performance Driving Events (HPDE), automotive rallies, Time Trial, autocross and amateur, club-level automotive racing, divided amongst regionally based chapters within the United States.

In September 2006, NASA held its first-ever National Championships at Mid-Ohio. The NASA National Championships are open to any driver who earns points in a minimum of five regional races (in any NASA region or combination of regions).

Since 2021, the NASA National Championships have been held at Daytona International Speedway.

Previous logo (1991–2005)

== Time trial ==
Racing in the time trial classes allows drivers to compete against each other for the fastest lap. It is currently NASA's mid-level offering, fitting between the HPDE and road racing series.

== Competitive racing ==
NASA currently offers the following Road Racing series:

- 944 Spec
- American Iron Racing
- American Iron Extreme
- Camaro Mustang Challenge
- Endurance Racing
- German Touring Series
- Honda Challenge
- NASA Prototype
- NASA Rally Sport
- Spec3
- Spec E30
- Spec E46
- Spec Iron
- Spec Miata
- Spec Z
- Super Touring/Super Unlimited
- Thunder Roadster
- Team Racing Endurance Challenge (TREC)

== Other sanctioned competition series ==
- 25 Hours of Thunderhill
- HyperFest: The Automotive Amusement Park
- One Lap of America
- NASA Rally Sport
- Teen Mazda Challenge
- United States Touring Car Championship

== NASA regions ==
- Arizona
- NorCal
- SoCal
- MidAmerica
- Florida
- Great Lakes
- Hawaii
- Mid-Atlantic
- Mid South
- NOLA
- Northeast
- Rally Sport
- Rocky Mountain
- Southeast
- Texas Region
- Utah
