= Cameron Lawrence (racing driver) =

American racing driver (born 1992)

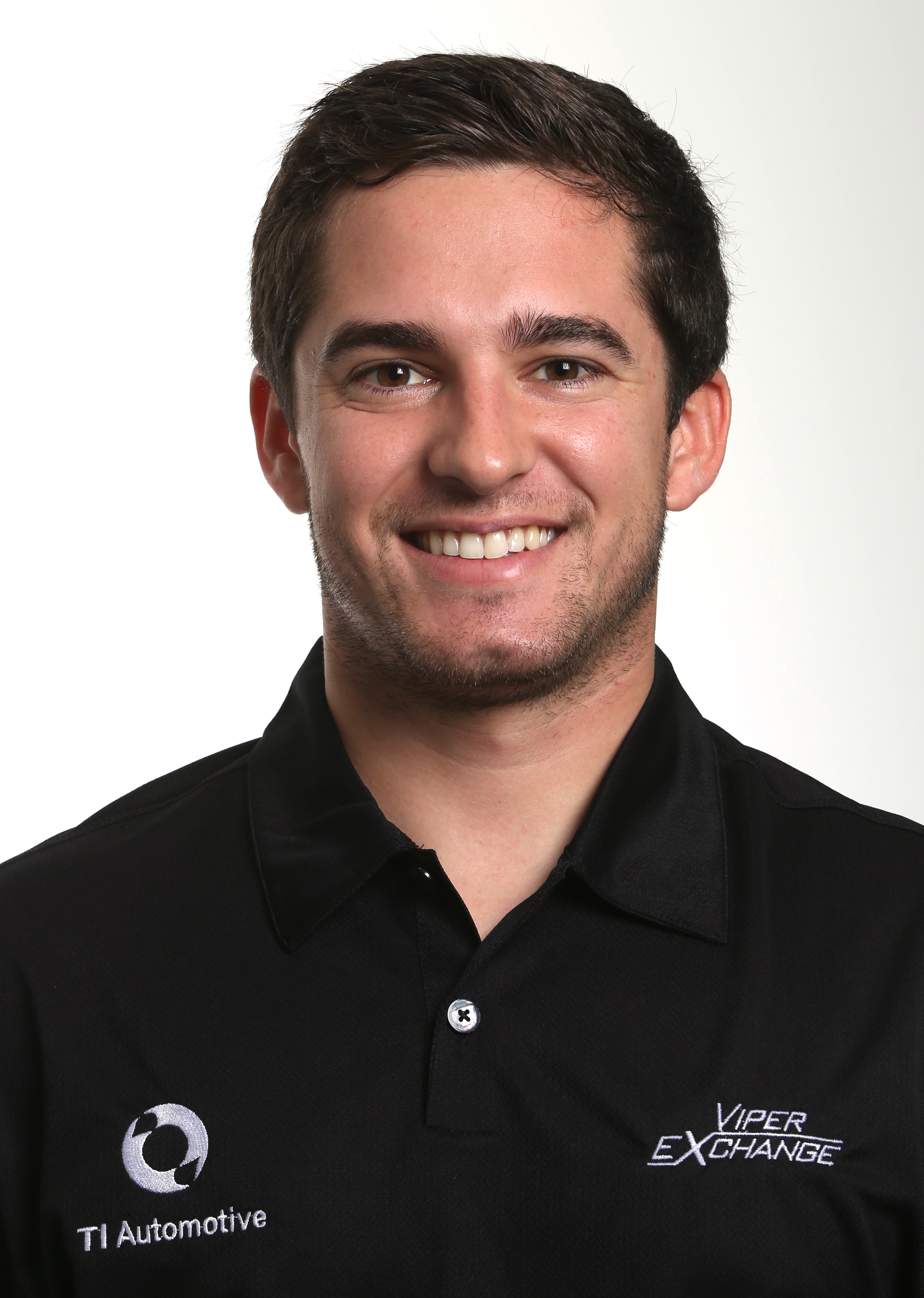
- Cameron Lawrence
- Nationality: (United States) American
- Born: August 7, 1992 (age 34) Orlando, Florida, U.S.

WeatherTech SportsCar Championship career
- Debut season: 2015
- Categorisation: FIA Silver
- Starts: 5
- Wins: 2
- Poles: 1

Championship titles
- SCCA Trans-Am Series TA2 Champion (2013, 2014); WeatherTech SportsCar Championship North American Endurance Cup GTD Champion (2015)

NASCAR FedEx Freight Truck Series career
- 1 race run over 1 year
- 2021 position: 90th
- Best finish: 90th (2021)
- First race: 2021 Toyota Tundra 225 (Austin)
Wins	Top tens	Poles
0	0	0
- Statistics up to date as of December 30, 2021.

Cameron Lawrence (born August 7, 1992) is an American professional racing driver and 2015 North American Endurance Cup (NAEC) champion in the GTD class in the IMSA WeatherTech SportsCar Championship.

== Racing career ==
Lawrence began his professional racing career in 2011, where he drove for Miller Racing in the SCCA Trans-Am Series TA2 Class and finished third in his debut race at Road Atlanta. In 2013, Lawrence competed in the Trans-Am Series with Miller Racing in a Dodge Challenger in the TA2 Class where he claimed victory in eight of the championship's ten rounds en route to his first professional championship. At 21 years old, Lawrence also became the youngest champion in the Trans-Am Series' entire history.

For 2014, Lawrence took an additional seven wins and a second-straight TA2 class championship with Miller Racing. In 2015, Lawrence returned for a third season with Miller Racing in TA2 where he took four more victories and led the championship heading into the final round at Daytona International Speedway where he, after starting 26th due to a red flag during qualifying, passed fifteen cars in the opening three laps before he was forced to pit with mechanical issues, effectively costing him a third-straight championship.

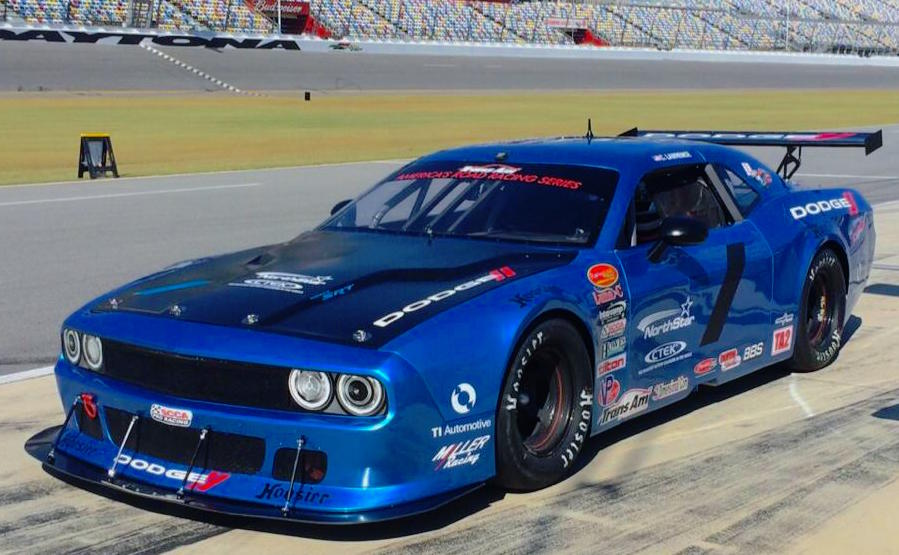
Lawrence's 2014 TA2 Championship-Winning Miller Racing Dodge Challenger at Daytona International Speedway.

Lawrence joined Riley Technologies at the beginning of the 2015 United SportsCar Championship where competed in the No. 93 Viper Exchange/TI Automotive Dodge Viper. At the 2015 24 Hours of Daytona, Lawrence took the GTD class win on his first attempt alongside teammates Al Carter, Dominik Farnbacher, Ben Keating, and Kuno Wittmer. Lawrence continued the 2015 North American Endurance Cup (NAEC) season with fourth place at the 12 Hours of Sebring and a win at the 6 Hours of Watkins Glen. At Petit Le Mans, Lawrence took his first WeatherTech SportsCar Championship pole in his first qualifying attempt in the series, narrowly beating out the Porsches of Leh Keen and Spencer Pumpelly in the final minute of a severely wet qualifying session. In the race, Lawrence and teammates Al Carter and Marc Goossens ran at or near the top of the field all day before they finished third, clinching the North American Endurance Cup (NAEC) in the GTD Class for Lawrence and Carter.

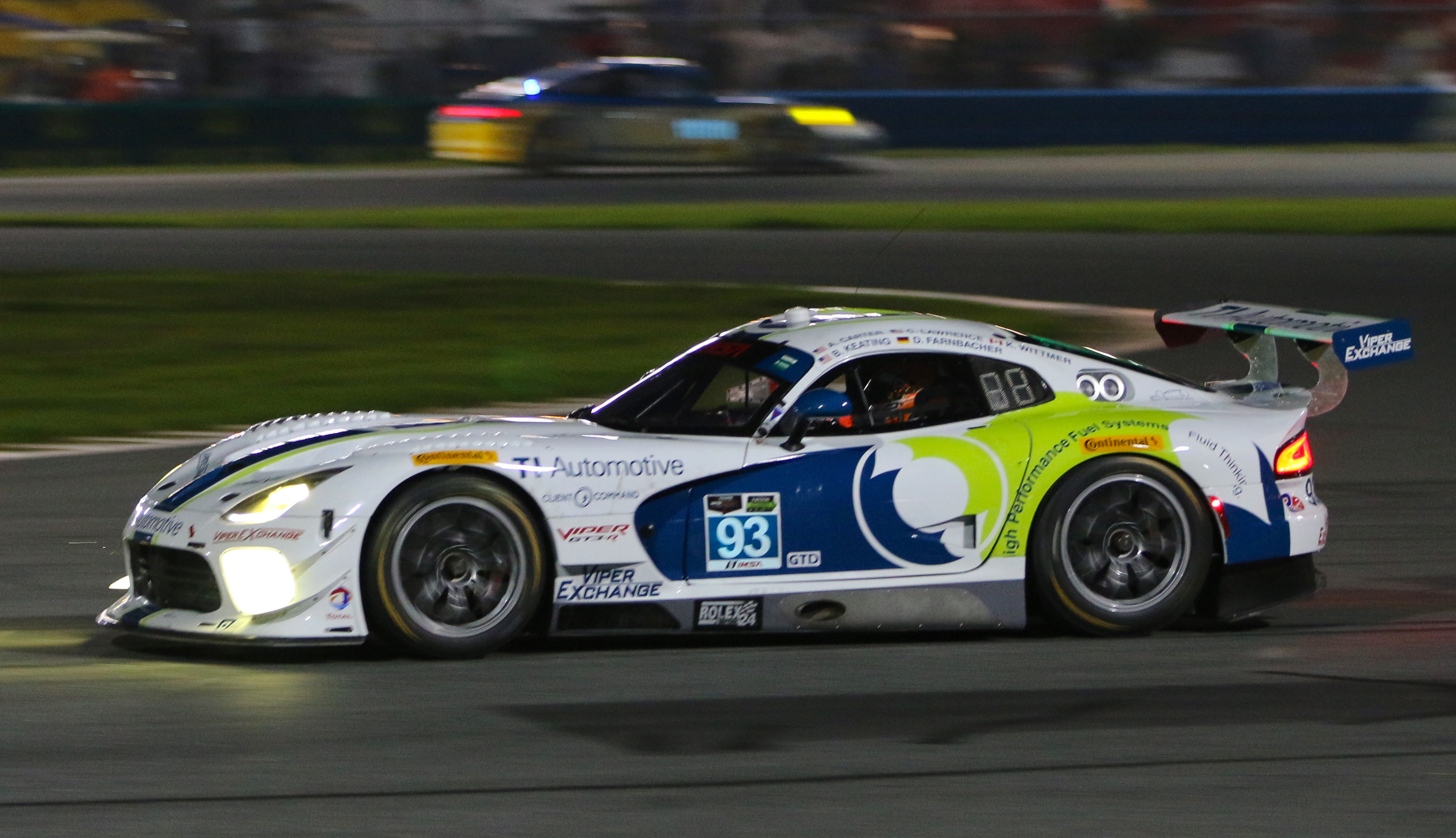
Lawrence driving for Riley Technologies en route to victory in the 2015 24 Hours of Daytona.

Lawrence made his Prototype (P) Class debut at the 2016 12 Hours of Sebring driving for Alegra Motorsports in their BMW-powered PokerStars/inSync Riley Daytona Prototype alongside Dominik Farnbacher, Daniel Morad, and Carlos de Quesada. Lawrence ran as high as fourth overall before electrical issues forced the team to take an extended pitstop which put the car well outside the top ten. Lawrence competed in select Continental Tire SportsCar Challenge races in the ST class with Honda of America Racing Team (HART) where he finished second at Circuit of the Americas and finished in the top-ten in six out of eight races. Lawrence returned to IMSA WeatherTech SportsCar Championship for Petit Le Mans where he competed with Turner Motorsports in the No. 97 BMW M6 GT3 and finished third with teammates Michael Marsal and Markus Palttala.

In 2017, Lawrence competed with Class Auto Motorsports in the Trans-Am Series presented by Pirelli Tire where he finished fourth in the TA2 season championship with eight top five finishes. Lawrence earned his first win in the TA class at Brainerd International Raceway with Derhaag Motorsports.

Lawrence competed in his first international races in 2018 with the Creventic 24 Hours of Dubai in Dubai, United Arab Emirates with Sorg Rennsport and the Bathurst 12 Hours in Bathurst, Australia with MARC Cars. Lawrence returned to Turner Motorsports for the Rolex 24 Hours of Daytona with co-drivers Don Yount, Mark Kvamme, Jens Klingmann and Martin Tomczyk.

In 2021, Lawrence joined Reaume Brothers Racing for his NASCAR Camping World Truck Series debut at Circuit of the Americas. Despite qualifying a team-record seventh, he finished last due to mechanical problems.

== Personal life ==
Lawrence was born in Orlando, Florida, and graduated from the University of Central Florida with a B.A. in Business Management and a minor in Marketing in 2015. He currently resides in Austin, Texas with his wife, Morgan.

== Motorsports career results ==
=== IMSA WeatherTech SportsCar Championship series results ===
(key) (Races in bold indicate pole position; races in italics indicate fastest lap)

Year	Team	Class	Make	Engine	1	2	3	4	5	6	7	8	9	10	11	Rank	Points
2015	Riley Motorsports	GTD	Dodge Viper GT3-R	Dodge 8.3 L V10	DAY; 1	SEB; 4	LGA	BEL	WGL; 1	LIM	ELK	VIR	AUS	**ATL**; **3**		12th	144
2016	Alegra Motorsports	P	Riley Mk XXVI DP	Dinan (BMW) 5.0 L V8	DAY	SEB; 11	LBH	LGA	BEL	WGL	MOS	ELK	COA	PET		35th	21
2016	Turner Motorsport	GTD	BMW M6 GT3	BMW 4.4 L V8	DAY	SEB	LGA	BEL	WGL	MOS	LIM	ELK	VIR	AUS	PET; 3†	65th	1
2018	Turner Motorsport	GTD	BMW M6 GT3	BMW 4.4 L V8	DAY; 14	SEB	MOH	BEL	WGL	MOS	LIM	ELK	VIR	LGA	PET	58th	17

^{†} Lawrence did not complete sufficient laps in order to score full points.

==== 24 Hours of Daytona ====
(key)

24 Hours of Daytona results
Year	Class	No	Team	Car	Co-drivers	Laps	Position	Class Pos.
2015	GTD	93	(United States) Riley Technologies	Dodge Viper GTS-R	(United States) Al Carter (Germany) Dominik Farnbacher (United States) Ben Keating (Canada) Kuno Wittmer	704	11	**1**
2018	GTD	96	(United States) Turner Motorsport	BMW M6 GT3	(Germany) Jens Klingmann (Germany) Martin Tomczyk (United States) Mark Kvamme (United States) Don Yount	733	34	15

=== NASCAR ===
(key) (Bold – Pole position awarded by qualifying time. Italics – Pole position earned by points standings or practice time. * – Most laps led.)

==== Xfinity Series ====
NASCAR Xfinity Series results
Year	Team	No.	Make	1	2	3	4	5	6	7	8	9	10	11	12	13	14	15	16	17	18	19	20	21	22	23	24	25	26	27	28	29	30	31	32	33	NXSC	Pts	Ref
2023	MBM Motorsports	66	Toyota	DAY	CAL	LVS	PHO	ATL	COA; DNQ	RCH	MAR	TAL	DOV	DAR	CLT	PIR	SON	NSH	CSC	ATL	NHA	POC	ROA	MCH	IRC	GLN	DAY	DAR	KAN	BRI	TEX	ROV	LVS	HOM	MAR	PHO	N/A	0	

==== Camping World Truck Series ====
NASCAR Camping World Truck Series results
Year	Team	No.	Make	1	2	3	4	5	6	7	8	9	10	11	12	13	14	15	16	17	18	19	20	21	22	NCWTC	Pts	Ref
2021	Reaume Brothers Racing	33	Chevy	DAY	DAY	LVS	ATL	BRI	RCH	KAN	DAR	COA; 36	CLT	TEX	NSH	POC	KNX	GLN	GTW	DAR	BRI	LVS	TAL	MAR	PHO	90th	1	

^{*} Season still in progress
^{1} Ineligible for series points
