= Mel Shaw (racing driver) =

American racing driver (1946–2017)

Melvin D. Shaw (September 22, 1946 – July 2, 2017) was an American racing driver. Shaw raced in various series and races such as the 24 Hours of Daytona. Shaw died in a crash at Brainerd International Raceway.

Shaw and his wife were residents of Voorhees Township, New Jersey.

== Career ==
Shaw started racing in 1968. In 1971, he made his IMSA GT Championship debut. Sharing his Chevrolet Corvette with Cress Taylor, the duo finished 18th overall at Virginia International Raceway, second in the GTO class. During the same season, Shaw also competed at Summit Point Raceway in a Datsun 240Z. With teammate Larry Weaver, the team again finished in 18th place.

A regular in the SCCA GT1 class, Shaw made a single SCCA National Championship Runoffs start. In 1983 at Road Atlanta, Shaw qualified 14th, but failed to finish.

After a hiatus in racing, Shaw made his debut in the Grand-Am Cup. In a Pontiac Firebird, the team finished 30th at Mazda Raceway Laguna Seca.

In 2016, Shaw raced in the Clarington 200, the 2016 NASCAR Pinty's Series season opener at Canadian Tire Motorsport Park. Shaw participated in a Chevrolet entered by Canada's Best Racing Team. He retired early in the race.

=== Trans-Am ===
Shaw made his Trans-Am Series debut in 2011. Shaw competed in the inaugural TA2 class season in 2011. He competed the full season in the TA2 class in Chevrolet Camaro. During 2012, 2013 and 2014 despite scoring numerous top-ten finishes, Shaw failed to enter the top-five. The point finishes meant Shaw ended in seventh place in the championship in 2014. The New Jersey–based driver stepped into the TA3-A class for 2015. In the fourth round of the championship, at Lime Rock Park, he scored his first podium finish, placing third. He again placed third at NOLA Motorsports Park. Solid point finishes placed him third in the final standings, behind champion Ernie Francis Jr. and runner-up Todd Napieralski. In 2016 Shaw missed the last two races of the season, placing eighth in the series championship.

Shaw's 2017 Trans-Am season was cut short by a deadly crash. He was competing at Brainerd International Raceway in a regional SCCA GT2 class race. On July 2, during the race, Shaw failed to slow down for turn 3. He hit a concrete barrier head-on and was killed on site by the impact.
