= Amy Ruman =

American racing driver

- Ruman in 2015
- Nationality: American
- Born: 30 January 1974 (age 52) Akron, Ohio, U.S.
- Relatives: Bob Ruman (father)

Trans-Am career
- Debut season: 2005 Trans-Am Series
- Current team: Ruman Racing
- Car number: 23
- Starts: 79
- Best finish: 1st in 2015 and 2016

Previous series
- 2002-2012, 1995-2001: SCCA National Championship Runoffs; SCCA Spec Racer Ford Pro Series

Amy Ruman (born January 30, 1974) is an American racing driver. She is a two-time champion (2015, 2016) of the Trans-Am Series, at its top level, "TA," which completed its 50th anniversary season in 2016.

She entered SCCA National Championship Runoffs races with her father's Corvette in the GT-1 class. She qualified for the SCCA national run-offs nine times from 2003-2012 with a best finish of third in 2010.

Ruman was inducted into the Trans-Am Series Hall of Fame in 2025.
