= Kevin Kalkhoven =

Australian venture capitalist and auto racing (1944–2022)

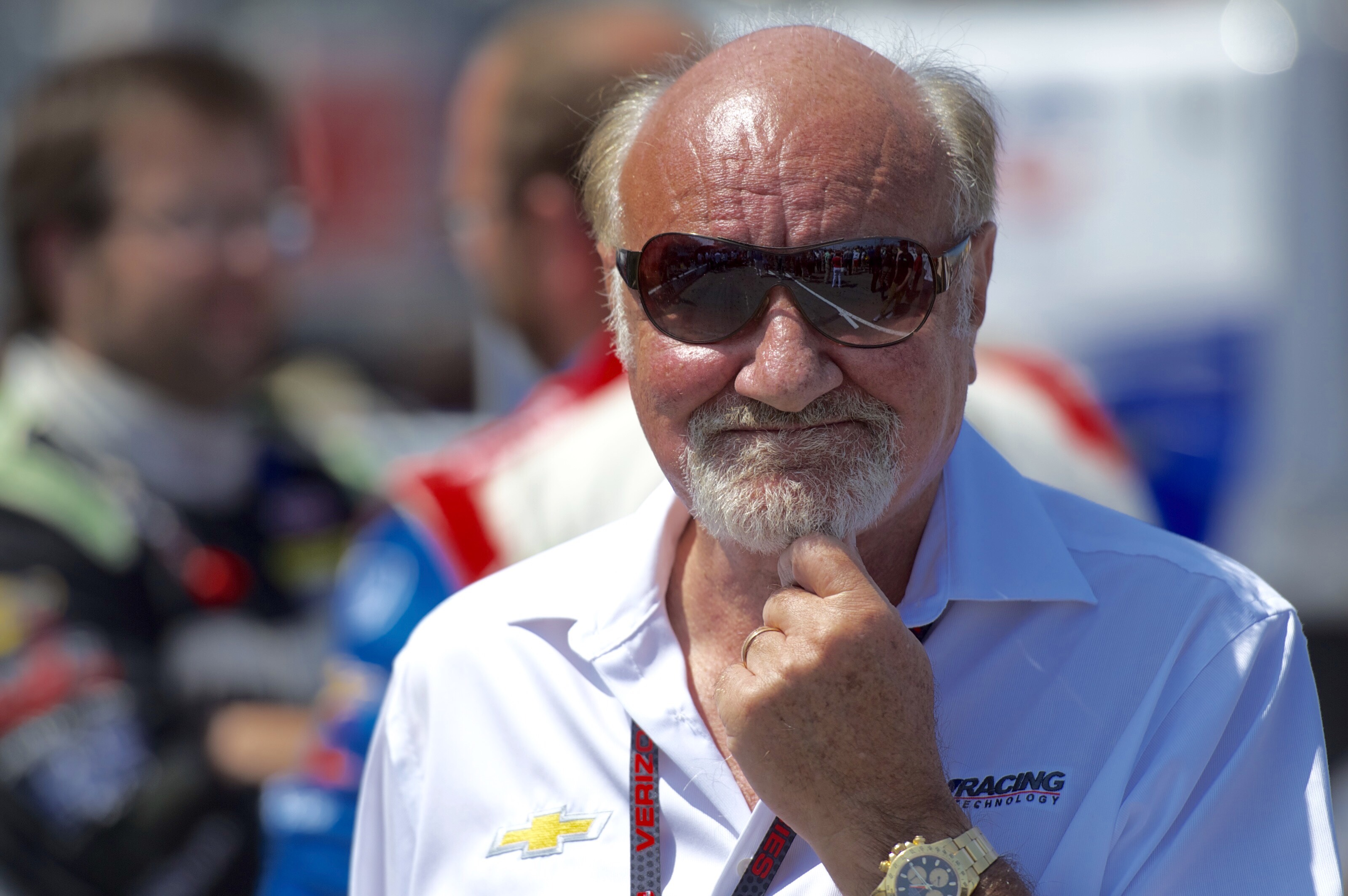
- Kalkhoven in 2011
- Born: Kevin Oscar Newton Kalkhoven; June 1, 1944; Australia
- Died: January 4, 2022 (aged 77); Alamo, California, U.S.

Kevin Oscar Newton Kalkhoven (1 June 1944 – 4 January 2022) was an Australian venture capitalist and auto racing magnate based in California. He was CEO of JDS Uniphase and was an investor in Cosworth Group Holdings Limited, an automotive technology business headquartered in Northampton, United Kingdom.

In July 2018 Kalkhoven was given an honorary doctorate by The University of Northampton.

Kalkhoven was a team owner of KV Racing Technology, with business partner Jimmy Vasser, which won the 2013 Indianapolis 500, driven by Tony Kanaan.

== JDS Uniphase Corporation ==
Kalkhoven joined the Uniphase Corporation in 1992 as president, CEO and chairman. Kalkhoven oversaw its transformation from a privately held manufacturer of industrial lasers into a publicly held supplier of components and modules for fibre-optic telecommunications networks and saw Uniphase become a member of the NASDAQ 100. During Kalkhoven's tenure, as CEO, the company’s annual sales rate increased over 67 times (sic) from $23 million in fiscal 1991 to the $394 million reported for the quarter ended 31 March 2000. Additionally, the market cap of Uniphase grew from $35 million to $100 billion. Kalkhoven oversaw the merger with JDS FITEL in July 1999 and the emergence of the combined entity in the fibre optic components and modules marketplace.

Kalkhoven was named in the May 2000 Worth magazine as one of America’s Top 50 CEOs.

== Motorsport interests ==
In 2003, Kalkhoven became one of the owners of the Champ Car World Series, with Gerald Forsythe, Paul Gentilozzi and Dan Pettit under the name OWRS, or Open-Wheel Racing Series, along with purchasing the rights to major races in Toronto and Long Beach as strategic measures to ensure the future of the Champ Car series.

That same year, Kalkhoven co-founded PK Racing (later known as PKV Racing and KV Racing Technology) together with British American Racing founder Craig Pollock. The team competed in both the Champ Car World Series and the IndyCar series, amassing five wins, including the 2013 Indianapolis 500, with driver Tony Kanaan.

In March 2008, Champ Car reached an agreement with Tony George, owner of the Indy Racing League, to merge the two series under the IndyCar Series banner for 2008 and beyond.

Kalkhoven was named as the Number 5 Most Powerful and Influential man in Racer Magazine's 2005 Power and Influence in Racing list (November 2005 issue).

== Cosworth ==
Kalkhoven purchased the Cosworth and Pi Group companies from Ford in 2004 with business partner Gerald Forsythe. Kalkhoven was chairman of the now-merged companies and he led the transition of the company from a motor-racing centric cost-centre to a profitable automotive technology company with LIDAR sensor technology and hybrid powertrains.

Under his stewardship Cosworth designed, developed and commercialized the Advanced Manufacturing Centre in Northampton and established its North American Headquarters and Advanced Manufacturing Center in Shelby Township, Michigan.

== Philanthropy ==
Kalkhoven was on the board of directors of the Association of Hole in the Wall Camps, which benefits children with serious and life-threatening medical conditions. He was a benefactor of the Mayo Clinic and has donated substantially to the Canary Foundation, which is dedicated to the early detection of cancer. Kalkhoven was a trustee of the Lizard Island Marine Research Station on Australia’s Barrier Reef. In addition, Kalkhoven was a donor to the Ansari X Prize, a competition to build privately funded crewed passenger spacecraft.

== Personal life and death ==
Kalkhoven was educated at the Whitgift School in Croydon, England. After leaving school he joined Mobil in Sevenoaks, England before joining IBM as a systems analyst.

He was also an avid aviator (he was a licensed commercial pilot and has extensive experience flying a variety of aircraft including Gulfstream intercontinental jets), and enjoyed alpine skiing, scuba diving, and wine-making.

Kalkhoven resided in the Bay Area bedroom community of Alamo, California on a 1,200 acre hillside estate. He died on January 4, 2022, at the age of 77.
