= Historic Stock Car Racing Series =

American automobile racing organization

- Sport: Auto racing
- Founded: 1994
- Headquarters: San Jose, CA

The Historic Stock Car Racing Series (HSCRS) is an auto racing organization based on the West Coast of the United States that was founded by San Jose, California, businessman John Davis in 1994 with a mandate to register, preserve, restore, and continue showcasing authentic NASCAR Winston Cup Series stock cars in friendly competition.

== History ==
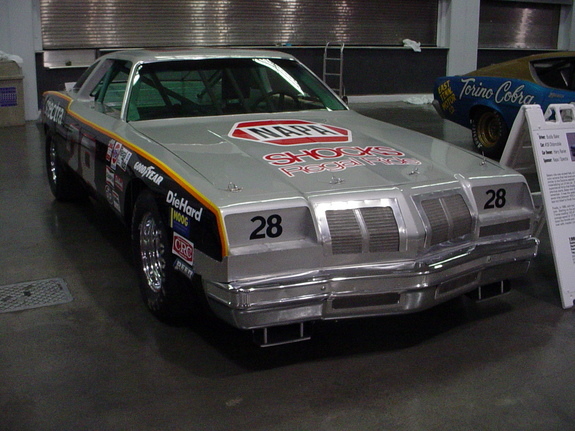
Buddy Baker's 1979 Oldsmobile on display at the San Jose Grand Prix, July 2007

Prior to the formation of the HSCRS, the few existing participants were limited to participating in vintage racing events and were often relegated to sub-groups that paired the 3400-lb. machines with much smaller vintage race cars that ranged from diminutive European compacts to Shelby Mustangs, Corvettes, and Cobras.

While this was initially done because there were not enough of the former NASCAR race cars to be treated as their own group, it revealed vast differences in speed and performance between the various types of cars. Although car-to-car contact is considered a grave offense in vintage racing (preservation of the vintage and historic race cars in lieu of cutthroat competition is paramount), racing accidents are inevitable. There began a growing concern that even minor contact between a massive purpose-built NASCAR racer and its smaller and lighter street-based counterpart could be devastating to the smaller car and especially to the driver.

While the cars were originally raced in NASCAR-sanctioned events, the group is not associated with NASCAR. The businesses and corporations that once sponsored these cars do not provide any compensation to the current owners, nor do they assume any liability for the continued competition of these race cars. Still, the cars are maintained in their original livery for accurate historical representation. As such, the group has raced at a number of venues, including the San Jose Grand Prix, Mazda Raceway Laguna Seca, Portland International, and Infineon Raceway, where they have run as a support race group for the Champ Car, the Daytona Prototypes, the Camping World West Series, and the SCCA Trans Am Series.

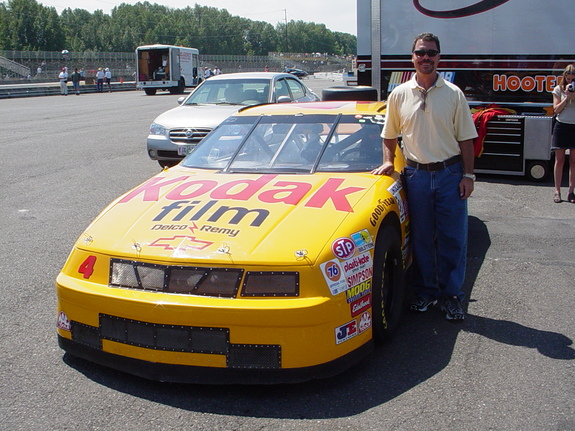
Ernie Irvan, 1991 Daytona 500 champion, poses with one of his former Morgan-McClure Motorsports Chevrolet race car now owned by HSCRS member, Tim Smith of Carson, NV.

== Rules & regulations ==
=== Vehicles ===
The cars that are raced by HSCRS members are retired and privately owned Winston Cup stock cars, with a few Busch Grand National stock cars grandfathered into the group. The newest HSCRS car is a 1995. Owners and drivers who wish to join the HSCRS are required to demonstrate that their car is a verifiable NASCAR stock car that, with a few exceptions allowed on behalf of driver safety, has been restored to its original racing condition.

One of the foremost reasons for maintaining 1995 and older vehicles for the Historic Stock Car Racing Series is the continuing evolution in modern stock car technology since then (such as chassis, brakes, engine, and aerodynamic improvements). These improvements make contemporary cars able to go faster, stop quicker, and turn better than traditional, historic stock cars, leaving older cars far less competitive than their newer counterparts. Another concern is that allowing the last year of eligibility to also grow with each passing year of NASCAR competition would further water down the "historic" nature of the HSCRS, the very principle of its origin. The feeling at the HSCRS is that it takes time to acquire historic or vintage significance and that if one wants to own and race a contemporary car, the venue for one is not the vintage circles or the Historic Stock Car Racing Series but in the pro ranks.

=== Classes ===
NASCAR stock cars that were built and raced in 1995 and earlier are eligible to race and are separated into classes:

1989–1995: Historic cars (110 inch wheelbase)
1981–1987: Chrome Bumper Classics
1980 and earlier: Vintage cars (full-size cars, notably 115 inches in wheelbase)

=== Parts and tires ===
Cars may use either roller camshafts (a type used in Busch Series and Craftsman Truck Series engines) or flat tappet camshafts (used in Nextel Cup engines). All cars using a roller camshaft must run a 10.0:1 compression ratio, slightly higher than the former 9.5:1 ratio mandated by NASCAR for those series. All cars using a flat-tappet camshaft must run with current NASCAR regulations mandating a 12.0:1 compression ratio, adopted in the late 1990s. Cars must also run bias-ply tires, despite Goodyear's four-season transition (1989–92) to radial tires. The first race with radials was the 1989 First Union 400 at North Wilkesboro, NC. The last bias-ply race was the 1992 Food City 500 in Bristol, TN. NASCAR has exclusively used radial tires since then, and with Bristol being the late track to go radial with the August 1992 Bud 500, where later-model Historic cars (1986–88 Chevrolet Monte Carlo, 1990–94 Chevrolet Lumina, 1989–95 Ford Thunderbird, 1988–94 Pontiac Grand Prix, 1989–91 Buick Regal, and 1989–92 Oldsmobile Cutlass Supreme) all raced with radial tires, and Contemporary cars have only used radial tires.

== Philanthropy ==
Of special significance is the HSCRS Ride of Your Life (ROYL) program, which, in the last 10 years, has raised over $400,000 for a variety of charities, including the Canary Fund, the Susan B. Komen Cancer Relief Foundation, the 11-99 Foundation, the Boost Foundation of Sonoma County, the SPCA of Monterey County, and the Cerebral Palsy Foundation of the North Bay. With the ROYL, winning bidders are given an e-ticket ride at speed around a real race track in the passenger seat of one of the historic stock cars.
