= Lauren Fix =

Automotive journalist and racing driver

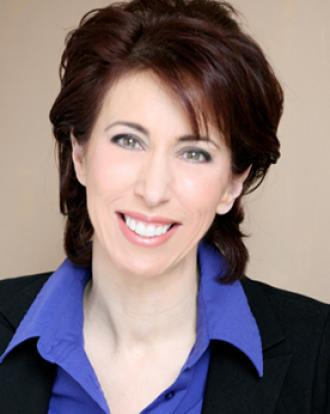
- Lauren Fix, aka "The Car Coach"
- Born: Lauren Jonas; Dearborn, Michigan, US
- Occupations: Car expert, TV and media personality
- Spouse: Paul Fix II
- Website: http://www.laurenfix.com

Lauren Fix is an automotive expert and analyst based in Buffalo, New York and New York, New York. She has written three books on automobiles. She has appeared on CNN, Fox News, Newsmax TV, CNBC, and USA Radio's Daybreak USA show.

== Racing career ==
Fix began racing in New York in 1981 in the SCCA Solo II Series. She debuted with a third-place finish. By 1989, she switched to road racing and started competing in a historic 1966 Trans Am Mustang.

She competed in SVRA, HSR and the Canadian G.T. Challenge Cup sanctioned by FIA. Fix operated the Driving Ambitions Performance Driving School at Watkins Glen International Raceway from 1986 to 2001.

Since 2001, Fix raced in the SVRA series in a 1996 Jack Roush Mustang in Vintage TransAm. From 2014 to present, she has raced a 2000 Jaguar XKRS in SVRA.

== Media ==
Fix co-hosts Talk 2 DIY Automotive on DIY, providing demonstrations and tips for auto repair. She hosted the television show local TV networks called Car Smarts.

She has appeared in magazines including Redbook, USA Today, and Woman's World. She has been featured on several national television shows, including Oprah, Fox News, 20/20, The View, and Live with Regis and Kelly. Fix was a regular guest expert on CNBC's On the Money, with Carmen Wong Ulrich.

She wrote a regular Sunday weekly column for The Buffalo News, called "Car Coach".

Every Friday, she appears on Newsmax TV's The Hard Line, hosted by Ed Berliner, to discuss the automotive news of the week.

She is the past automotive editor for Your Life.com magazine as well as the author of Lauren Fix's Guide to Loving Your Car: Everything You Need to Know to Take Charge of Your Car and Get On with Your Life, her third book from St. Martin's Press.

Lauren Fix is a member of the SEMA SBN Steering Committee and the Aftermarket (automotive) Industry Association. She is a registered IMPA International Motor Press Association Journalist with credentials. She is the spokesperson for the non-profit Car Care Council AAIA and the Be Car Care Aware Program.

She was the National Automotive Correspondent for Time Warner Cable, YNN, now known as TWC News; her segments aired twice per week nationally until March 2014 In addition, the Weather Channel has named Lauren Fix their automotive expert for on-air tips and advice.

== Professional highlights ==
- 1999: "40 Under 40 Business Award" winner
- 2000: Car Care Council Communications Award - AAIA
- 2002: Women of the Year - Business Advisory Board of NY
- 2003: International Automotive Media Award - Public Service
- 2004: Top 25 Women Who Mean Business Award
- 2004: Northwood University Automotive Aftermarket Management Award
- 2005 and 2006: Best PR Campaign – Business to Consumer
- 2007: Stevie Awards - Best Marketing Campaign - "Flood Damaged Cars" from Hurricane Katrina
- 2008: Automotive Woman of the Year AAIA
- 2009: Inducted into the National Women and Transportation Hall of Fame
- 2009: Automotive Communications Award AAIA
- 2010: Women Of Distinction Award - Entrepreneur
- 2011: Winner of the Automotive Communications Award in the categories Consumer Education and Public Relations Efforts; AAIA
- 2011: Winner of the Automotive Communications Award - TV Segment for The Car Coach TV show; AAIA
- Juror - Internet Car of the Year
- Women's World Car of the Year - judge
- 2014: Woman of the Year; SEMA
- 2015: juror - North American Car of the Year
- 2016: Board of Directors, Secretary / Treasurer - North American Car of the Year Awards (NACTOY)
- 2018 - 2020: Board of Directors, President - North American Car of The Year Awards (NACTOY)

== Personal ==
Fix is her real last name. Her daughter is Shelby Fix, the "Teen Car Coach" / "Car Coach 2.0", and was named after Carroll Shelby. Her husband, Paul Fix, is a professional Trans-Am Series driver. Her son, actor Paul Fix III, has appeared on As the World Turns.

== Selected bibliography ==
- Driving Ambitions (1993)
- Performance Tire and Wheel Handbook (1998)
- Lauren's Guide To Car Smarts (2008)

== Sources ==
- Dorsey, Sarah (16 April 2005) CNN Live Saturday Body of Sarah Lunde has Been Found; A look at Hybrid Automobiles with Lauren Fix - Part 2.
- PrimeZone (17 March 2006) Spring Shape-Ups for Your Car! With Car Coach Lauren Fix; podcast available at http://www.moreaboutthat.info
- Morales, Natalie. (21 July 2006) NBC Today Show Profile: Lauren Fix gives tips for women shopping for a new car.
- Lauren Fix on UB alumni site
- Operation 7 Save a Life: Winter Car Safety - WABC-TV
