= Paul Fix (racing driver) =

American racing driver

Paul Fix II
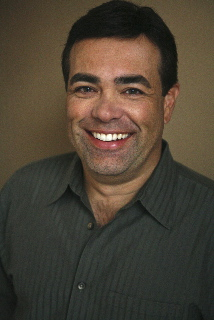
- Nationality: American
- Born: New York

Trans-Am Series career
- Debut season: 2000
- Current team: Fix Motorsports
- Car number: 50
- Crew chief: Gary Johnson, Tony Ave (2013)
- Spotter: Danny Kok
- Starts: 166
- Podiums: 68
- Poles: 26

Paul Fix II is an American racecar driver based in Williamsville, New York, United States. He has been competing in the SCCA Professional Trans-Am Series since 2000.

== Racing career ==
Fix began racing in amateur competitions in Sports Car Club of America (SCCA) Solo II events in the late 1980s and subsequently started entering series sanctioned by the SVRA and the Historic Sportscar Racing Ltd (HSR). He has won several races in both series with many podium finishes. Fix started his professional racing career in 2000, participating in SCCA Pro Racing Trans-Am Series at Road America, in Elkhart Lake, Wisconsin. He has since competed in several other racing series, including the American LeMans Series (ALMS). In his rookie Trans Am season, he totaled one top-ten finish and was third place overall in rookie points. He was also ranked 19th in Driver's Championship points and sixth in Owner's points.

In addition to the Trans-Am Series, Fix has also been participating in Vintage and Historic competitions since 1989 and GT Racing since 1999 with the following awards and honors:

- The Steuben Crystal Apple Award for Best of Show, Antique Automobile Club of America (AACA). Vintage car show at Watkins Glen International as part of the 1989 SVRA Serengeti Cup vintage races celebrating the 25th anniversary of the Ford GT40.
- Antique Automobile Club of America (AACA) Junior First. 2009 Hersey, Pennsylvania. National Fall Meat.
- Mustang Club of America (MCA) Thoroughbred division first place, Mustang 25th Anniversary, 1989 Grand National meet in Winchester, Virginia.
- Shelby American Automobile Club (SAAC) Gold Concours Award, 1990 Dearborn National Convention.
- Shelby American Automobile Club (SAAC) Premier Concours Award, 1991 Charlotte National Convention.

Fix also participated in the Canadian GT Challenge Cup sanctioned by the ASN Canada FIA. Career highlights include the 2005 Champ Car Trans-Am series Molson Indy Montreal at Circuit Gilles Villeneuve. Fix started 7th overall, finishing first in the GT category. He raced in his number 77 Stopflex Mustang sponsored by Computer Systems Centre and Drive! Magazine.

Fix participated in many other major events throughout his career including pole position for the 2005 Taylor Woodrow Grand Prix of San Jose Cytomax 100.

After a short break, Fix returned to professional racing in the SCCA Pro Trans-Am Road Racing Series 2013 season as a member of the Tony Ave Racing team, managed by fellow racecar driver Tony Ave. With this team Fix won the 2013 Trans-Am Championship Series Round 3 in the TA class at Lime Rock Park in Connecticut, and placed second at the Finger Lakes Wine Country Classic Trans Am Championship Round 4.

Fix Motorsports cars have received several awards, including the "MSD Hard Charger" and "Westward Tools Tough Team" awards at Mid-Ohio Buckeye 100 in 2002.

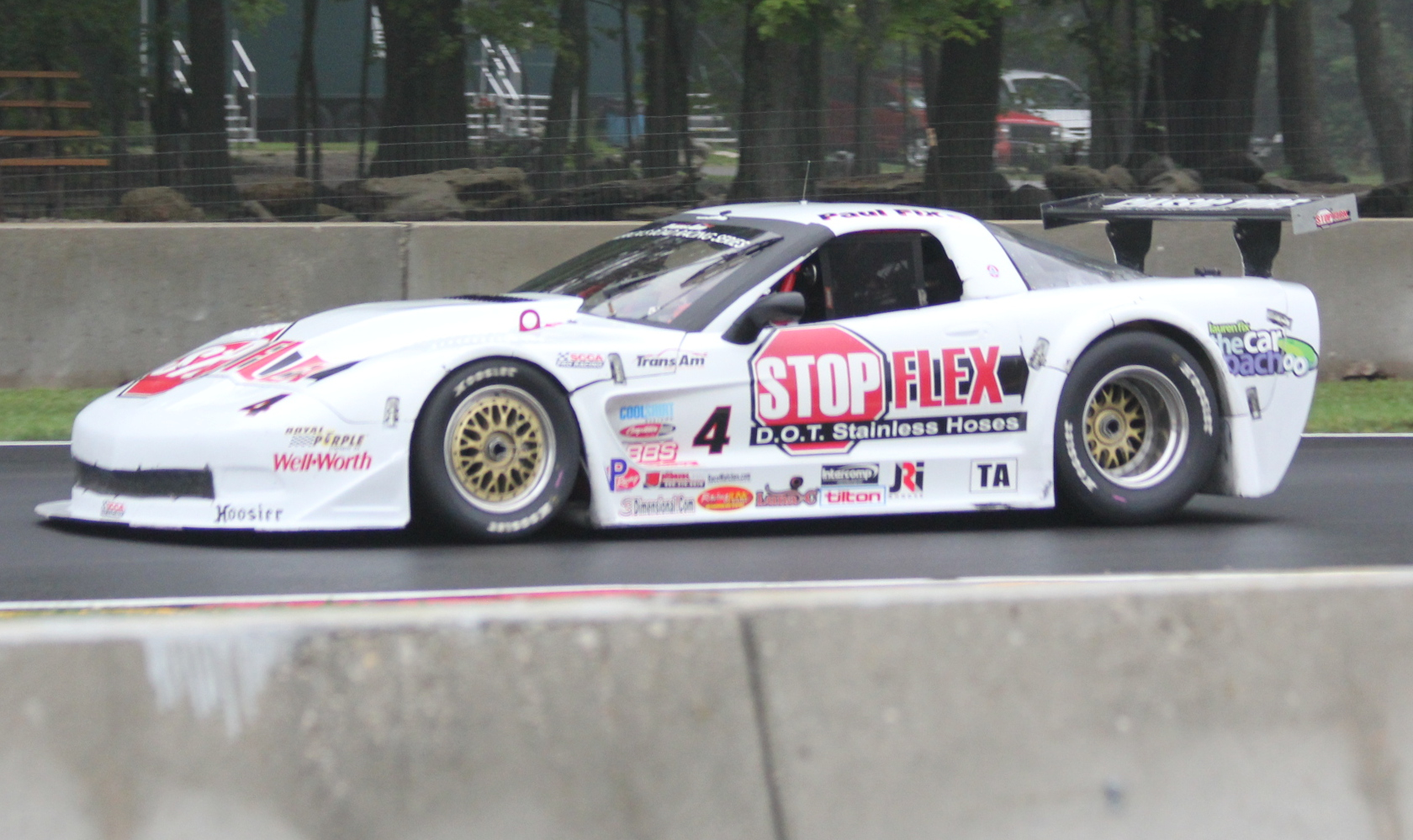
Fix at Road America in 2015

In June 2013, it was announced that Fix was to race at his "home" racetrack, Watkins Glen International in Watkins Glen, New York for the fourth stop on the 2013 Trans-Am Series schedule. Paul subsequently finished second in the race, behind teammate Doug Peterson.

Fix was penalized by Trans-Am for an incident at the 2016 Mid-Ohio Sports Car Course First Energy Trans Am 100 and put on probation for the rest of the 2016 season for "failure to avoid contact" and "reckless & dangerous driving".

2016 was another successful season for Fix; he finished second in points for the year.

In 2017, Fix joined the Ave/Riley Racing Team as the factory test driver of the AR-2 competing in International Motor Sport Association Prototype Challenge Series, running car No. 44. The car was tested at Red Bull Ring in Austria in 2016.

== Professional career ==
Fix is the president of Classic Tube, a company he co-founded with his wife, Lauren Fix. Founded in 1989 and based in Lancaster, New York, it manufactures automotive and industrial tubing products.

In 1989, Fix also founded Fix Motorsports, which prepares race cars for customers competing in series sanctioned by the SCCA, the Historic Sportscar Racing Ltd (HSR), SVRA and other series. The company also restores and resells classic and high performance cars.

== Personal ==
Fix married Lauren Fix in 1989. They have two children together, Shelby Fix and Paul Fix III.
