= Motor & Equipment Manufacturers Association =

- Founded: 1904
- Type: Trade Association
- Purpose: Motor Vehicle Parts Manufacturing and Small Business Advocacy
- Location(s): Research Triangle Park, NC, Washington, DC; Southfield, MI
- Region served: United States
- Key people: Bill Long, President & CEO
- Website: https://www.mema.org/

The Motor & Equipment Manufacturers Association (MEMA) was founded in 1904. MEMA represents more than 1,000 companies that manufacture motor vehicle components and systems for the original equipment and aftermarket segments of the light vehicle and heavy-duty motor vehicle manufacturing industry in the United States. Motor vehicle component manufacturers are the largest employer of manufacturing jobs in the U.S., contributing nearly 3 percent of the U.S. gross domestic product. Motor vehicle parts suppliers generate a total direct and indirect employment impact of 4.26 million jobs, up nearly 18 percent since 2012.

MEMA is the parent organization of four affiliate associations: the Automotive Aftermarket Suppliers Association, the Heavy Duty Manufacturers Association, the Association for Sustainable Manufacturing, and the Original Equipment Suppliers Association.

The motor vehicle component manufacturing industry in the U.S. has experienced robust growth due to an increase in demand and vehicle sales. The stability and highly integrated North American supply chain has also been particularly beneficial to suppliers, contributing to growth in both jobs and investments in the United States. Many suppliers located in the U.S. import and export vehicle parts and components within the North American market. Depending on supply chain logistics, parts are often exported to be combined with other parts, then imported back to the U.S. for final vehicle assembly.

== History ==
- 1904 – Leading industry companies joined together to form Automotive Parts and Accessories Association (APAA)
- 1914 – the name 'Automotive Parts and Accessories Association (APAA)' was then changed into 'Motor Accessories & Manufacturers Association (MAMA)'
- 1933 – MAMA co-sponsors the first Automotive Service Industries Show, forerunner of AAIW and Automotive Aftermarket Products Expo
- 1953 – the association later changed its name again to the Motor & Equipment Manufacturers Association (MEMA) to reflect its expanding role in representing both aftermarket and original equipment suppliers.
- 1960 – MEMA opens an office in Washington, D.C.
- 1970s – MEMA establishes the first of its many councils, serving as valuable forums for active industry executives
- 1983 – MEMA forms the Heavy Duty Manufacturers Association
- 1987 – MEMA establishes the Japan Automotive Advisory Group, supporting suppliers doing business in Japan
- 1992 – MEMA helps form the Automotive Aftermarket Industry Week
- 1998 – MEMA's Original Equipment Suppliers Association forms
- 2002 – MEMA establishes the Automotive Aftermarket Suppliers Association, exclusively serving aftermarket product manufacturers
- 2010 – MEMA establishes its Political Action Committee
- 2011 – MEMA establishes the Association for Sustainable Manufacturing
- 2015 – MEMA celebrates 110 years serving its more than 1,000 members

== Divisions ==
=== Automotive Aftermarket Suppliers Association ===
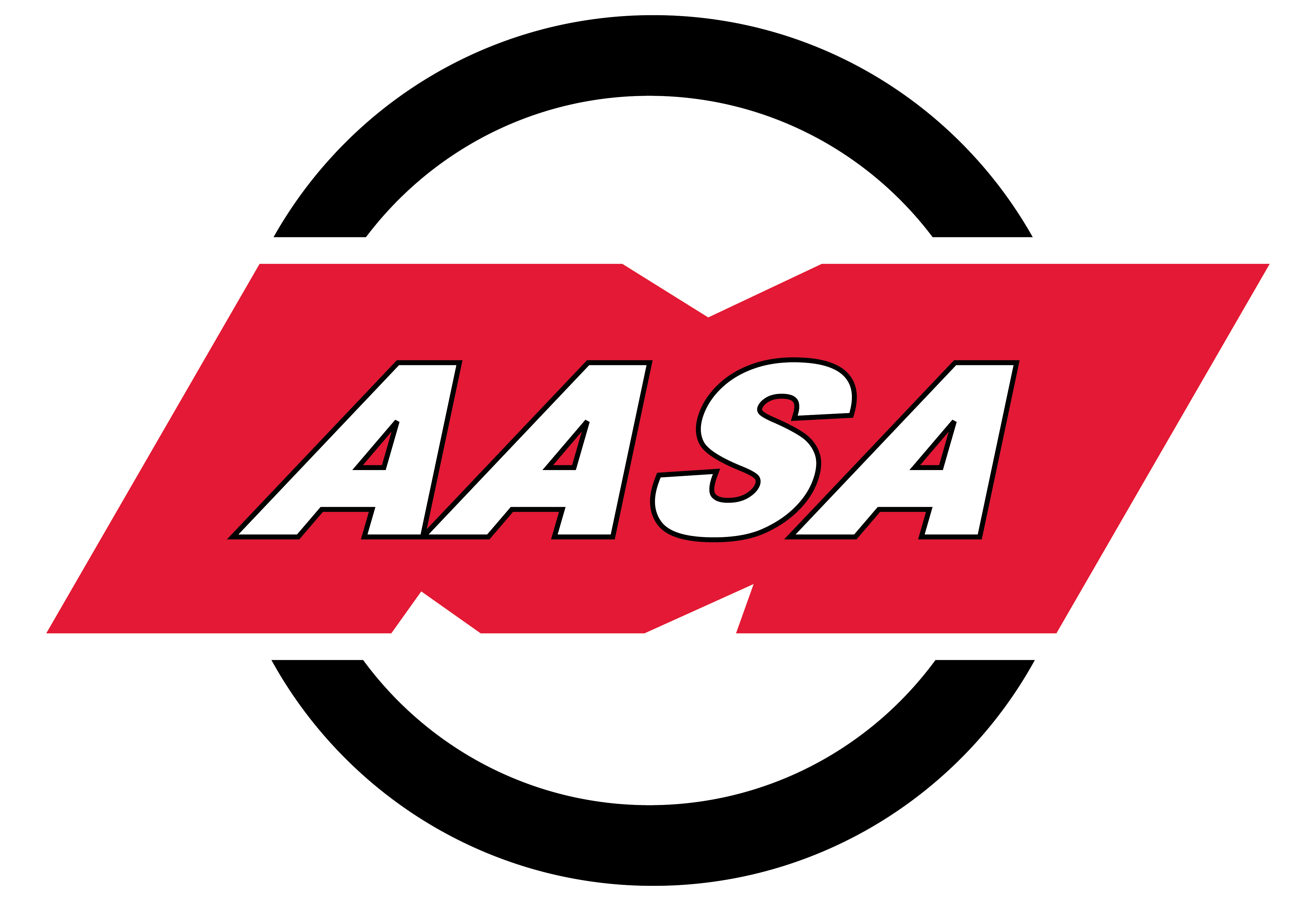

The Automotive Aftermarket Suppliers Association (AASA) is the light vehicle aftermarket division of MEMA. AASA exclusively serves manufacturers of aftermarket components, tools and equipment, and related products, an important part of the automotive parts manufacturing industry which supports 871,000 American jobs.

The U.S. aftermarket includes the manufacturing, distribution, retail, and installation of all vehicle parts, chemicals, tools, equipment, technologies, and accessories. Most aftermarket repair work takes place in a vehicle manufacturer’s dealership service facility or an independent repair shop, which includes national service chains. Once a new vehicle is sold, it becomes part of the aftermarket. Additionally, a “do-it-yourself” market exists – individuals who perform their own vehicle maintenance.

AASA manages several councils and committees that oversee policy issues affecting the many different sects of the aftermarket industry, including brake manufacturing, intellectual property and mobility technology.

AASA supports aftermarket suppliers and their drive to move business forward by providing industry analysis and strategic insights for business planning, engaging in meaningful government advocacy initiatives, organizing international and domestic professional conferences and peer councils, and conducting global outreach in growing markets.

The division also manages several events throughout the year, the largest being the Automotive Aftermarket Products Expo in Las Vegas, Nevada. Co-owned by AASA and the Auto Care Association, the expo is the largest annual trade show for automotive aftermarket industry professionals, featuring more than 2,500 exhibiting companies who offer the latest products, services and automotive technologies.

Paul McCarthy serves as AASA’s president and COO.

=== Heavy Duty Manufacturers Association ===
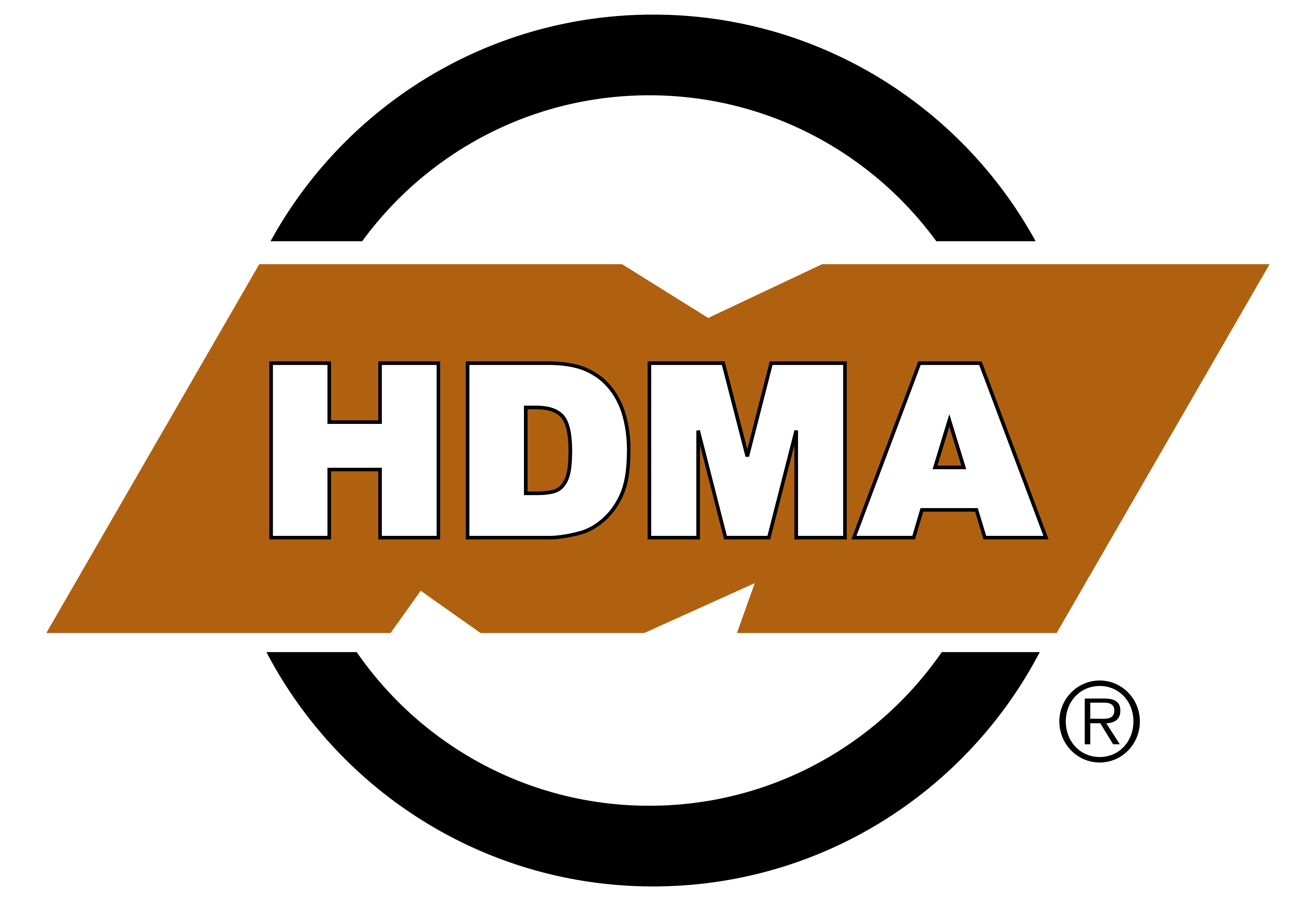

Founded in 1983, The Heavy Duty Manufacturers Association (HDMA) is the commercial vehicle division of the Motor & Equipment Manufacturers Association (MEMA). HDMA's mission is to advance the commercial vehicle supplier industry and the business interests of its members.

HDMA serves its 220+ commercial vehicle component-supplier members through government and industry advocacy, timely news and information, market research and analysis, promotion of the North American manufacturer/supplier industry, and facilitating industry networking through a range of events, peer councils, and services.

Membership includes North American suppliers in the global on- and off-highway equipment OEM and aftermarket sectors. HDMA's member services have a global perspective in a global industry; over 60% of HDMA member companies are global in scope. Suppliers in the on- and off-highway commercial vehicle equipment industry provide the original equipment parts used to manufacture commercial vehicles and aftermarket replacement parts needed to maintain them. Commercial vehicle suppliers are also responsible for developing most of the technologies that keep commercial vehicles safe and efficient.

HDMA launched a variety of councils since its initiation to address policy issues impacting the commercial vehicle industry. These include the Heavy Duty Business Forum, Heavy Duty Business Forum Europe, Heavy Duty Business Forum India, and Heavy Duty Business Forum Asia; the Heavy Duty Marketing and Sales Forum; the Off-Highway Business Forum; the Heavy Duty Advanced Technology Council; and the Heavy Duty Manufacturers Representatives Council.

HDMA also holds several conferences throughout the year to educate and empower their members. These include:

- Heavy Duty Aftermarket Dialogue (HDAD)

HDAD is an outlook conference, specifically directed toward the heavy duty aftermarket supplier industry. It is intended to provide an in-depth view of the prospects for the global, heavy duty aftermarket component for the next five years. This event delivers critical information by identifying the toughest emerging problems in the heavy duty aftermarket industry, as well as sharing the most successful strategies being implemented to counter them.

- Heavy Duty Aftermarket Week (HDAW)

HDAW is a partnership of three leading supplier and distributor organizations – CVSN, HDDA, and HDMA. The annual executive conference is designed to bring together all stakeholders in the heavy duty aftermarket independent distributor channel. Program content is developed by the HDAW Joint Operating Committee, consisting of 14 leading industry associations.

- The HDMA/MEMA Supplier Advocacy Network Day

MEMA’s Supplier Advocacy Network Day provides HDMA members access to high-ranking government officials, key elected officials and staff, and federal agencies through a two-day program including policy briefings, networking opportunities, and congressional visits. Each year, this program aims to address challenges and opportunities facing HDMA members.

- HDMA’s Annual Luncheon & Briefing

HDMA’s annual Luncheon & Briefing is presented at the North American Commercial Vehicle Show in Atlanta during odd-numbered years and at the International Automobile Exhibition (IAA) Show in Hanover, Germany during even numbered years. It is the premier must-attend program, which includes a highly informative program featuring industry leaders and allows attendees to network with industry peers.

As of 2018, Tim Kraus is the president and chief operating officer of HDMA.

=== The Association for Sustainable Manufacturing ===
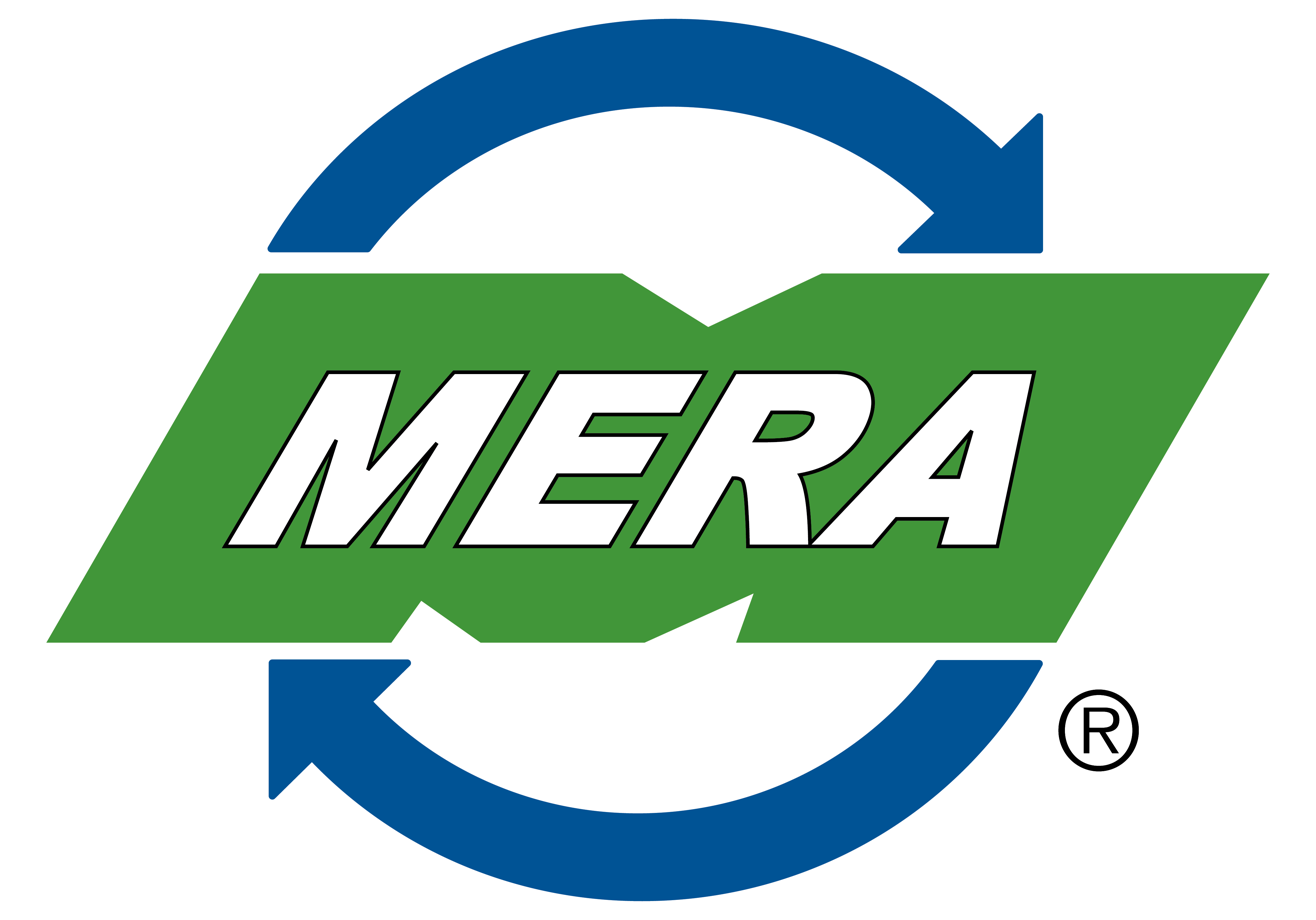

MERA is the remanufacturing and sustainability division of MEMA. With roots in the transportation industry, MERA represents the interests of the broader remanufacturing community across multiple industry sectors. The organization is a network of manufacturers, suppliers, universities, and professional services firms that promotes the economic, environmental, and product performance benefits of remanufacturing and similar forms of sustainable manufacturing.

Sustainable manufacturing can be simply defined as “manufacturing with reuse.” It is a manufacturing process that restores original products in a factory setting, yielding goods that are like new, but better than the originals. The finished goods have like-new quality, they offer better value, and they are better for the environment. As an eco-friendly process, sustainable manufacturing conserves materials and embodied energy, and it reduces landfill waste.

Different industry sectors use different terms to identify the remanufacturing process. For instance, in the automotive and commercial vehicle sectors, the term is remanufacturing; in aviation and aerospace, the reference is maintenance, repair and overhaul; and for medical devices, consumer goods and electronics, the term is refurbishing. (All of the above italicized terms are forms of sustainable manufacturing.)

Examples of goods that can go through the sustainable manufacturing process include vehicle parts, aircraft engines, magnetic resonance imaging machines, electronic modules, and mobile phones.

MERA introduced a new symbol for sustainable manufacturing that is based on the well-known recycling symbol, but includes an extra arrow. They also came up with a new phrase to accompany this symbol: “Reduce. Reuse. Reman. Recycle," with Reman standing for remanufacturing.

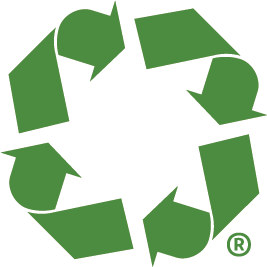

MERA is the home of Manufactured Again Certification, where new manufacturing and sustainable manufacturing are held to the same international quality standards. The program – based on ISO 9001 and IATF 16949 – also promotes corporate social responsibility, particularly environmental stewardship.

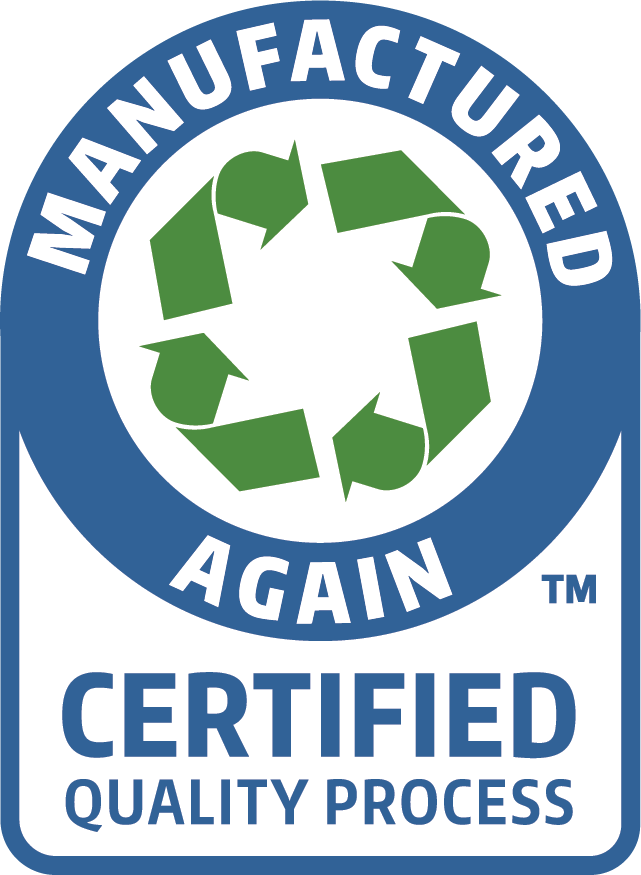

John Chalifoux serves as MERA’s president and chief operating officer.

=== Original Equipment Suppliers Association ===
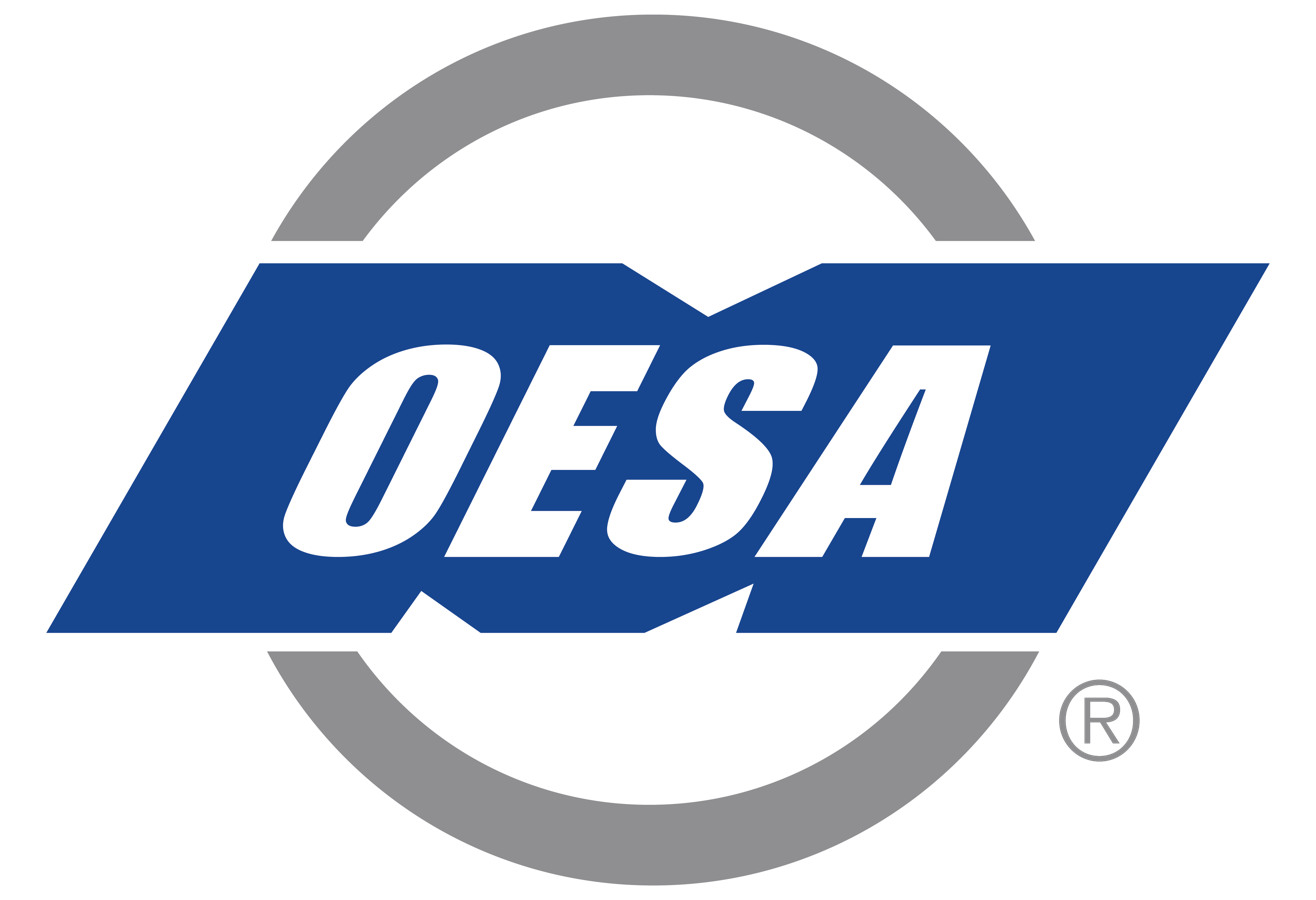

The mission of the Original Equipment Suppliers Association (OESA) is to champion the business interests of automotive original equipment (OE) suppliers. OE suppliers provide approximately 70 percent of vehicle value through components and new technology (i.e., V2V connectivity, ADAS, and electrification). Since 1998, the Association has been addressing issues of common concern and advocating on behalf of the supplier community throughout the supply chain and in Washington, D.C.

OESA facilitates collaboration across the automotive supply chain and provides industry data to assist members with business planning. The organization organizes industry events, coordinates peer group councils, and publishes research and analysis for the automotive supplier industry.

OESA Industry Events

OESA industry events play a key role in addressing the unique interests of the automotive supplier industry. Cornerstone OESA events provide OEM engagement opportunities, advance international and government relations and address member-relevant and industry-relevant issues. OESA hosts regular OEM Town Hall meetings with FCA (Financial Conduct Authority) (regulates financial services in the UK), Ford, General Motors, Honda, Nissan, Toyota and Volkswagen as well as new OEMs such as Rivian and Karma to assist suppliers in understanding OEM planning and make business connections.

OESA Peer Councils

OESA maintains several Peer Group Councils, designed for supplier executives with similar job functions. Supplier executives attend to network, address issues of common concern and learn best practices. These councils bring together nearly 700 top member company executives. Quarterly meeting agendas are member-driven, and content is developed to assist members with strategies to maximize and diversify top-line revenue, optimize operating costs and share best practices. Meetings include roundtable discussions and open forums on current topics of importance to members. OESA Councils include the following functional areas: Advanced Technology, Automotive Public Relations, Chief Executive Officer, Chief Financial Officers, Chief Purchasing Officers, Communication Executives, Enterprise Leadership, Environment, Health, Safety & Sustainability, Human Resources, Legal Issues, Sales Executive, Tooling Council, Warranty Management and Young Leadership. OESA also generates council-requested surveys to identify best practices and address the concerns that directly impact functional roles at supplier organizations.

Research and Analysis

OESA is the automotive industry’s key resource for supplier industry trends and research. Through the administration and analysis of various industry surveys, OESA captures and provides supplier sentiments and industry trends.

The OESA Automotive Supplier Barometer captures the quarterly pulse and analyzes the twelve-month business sentiments of top executives in the supplier industry. It is a snapshot of their concerns on commercial issues, the business environment and strategies that influence the supplier industry. Results are distributed to vehicle manufacturers, financial institutions, governmental officials and the media to provide an on-going profile of the trends in the supplier industry.

The OESA/HRI Automotive Tooling Barometer survey series was created by the OESA Tooling Council with the partnership of Harbour Results, Inc. to provide an indicator of the current state of the automotive tooling industry, and the perception of the near-term prospects for the industry. The OESA Automotive Tooling Barometer captures the sentiment of the major companies in this market.

Julie A. Fream serves as OESA’s president and CEO.

== See also ==
- Overseas Automotive Council
