= San Jose Grand Prix =

- Location: San Jose, California, United States; 37°19′41″N 121°53′26″W
- Corporate sponsor: Canary Fund, Redback Networks
- First race: 2005
- Last race: 2007
- Duration: 1 hour, 45 minutes
- Previous names: Taylor Woodrow Grand Prix of San Jose (2005); Canary Foundation Grand Prix of San Jose (2006); San Jose Grand Prix at Redback Raceway (2007)
- Most wins (driver): (France) Sébastien Bourdais (2)
- Most wins (team): (United States) Newman-Haas Racing (2)

Circuit information
- Surface: Asphalt/Concrete
- Length: 1.443 mi (2.322 km)
- Turns: 7
- Lap record: 0:49.584 ( (United Kingdom) Justin Wilson, Panoz DP01, 2007, Champ Car)

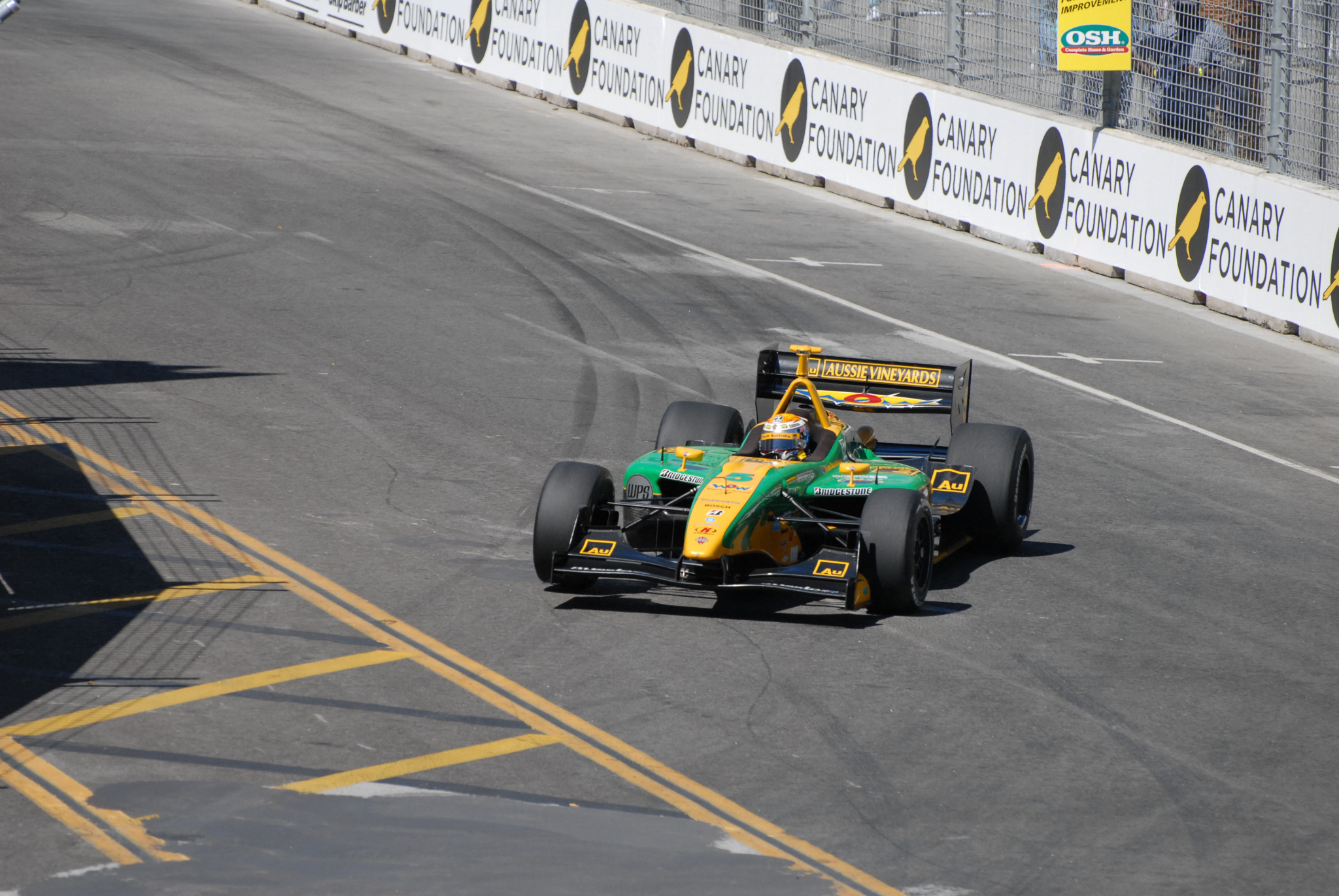
Will Power at the 2007 San Jose Grand Prix

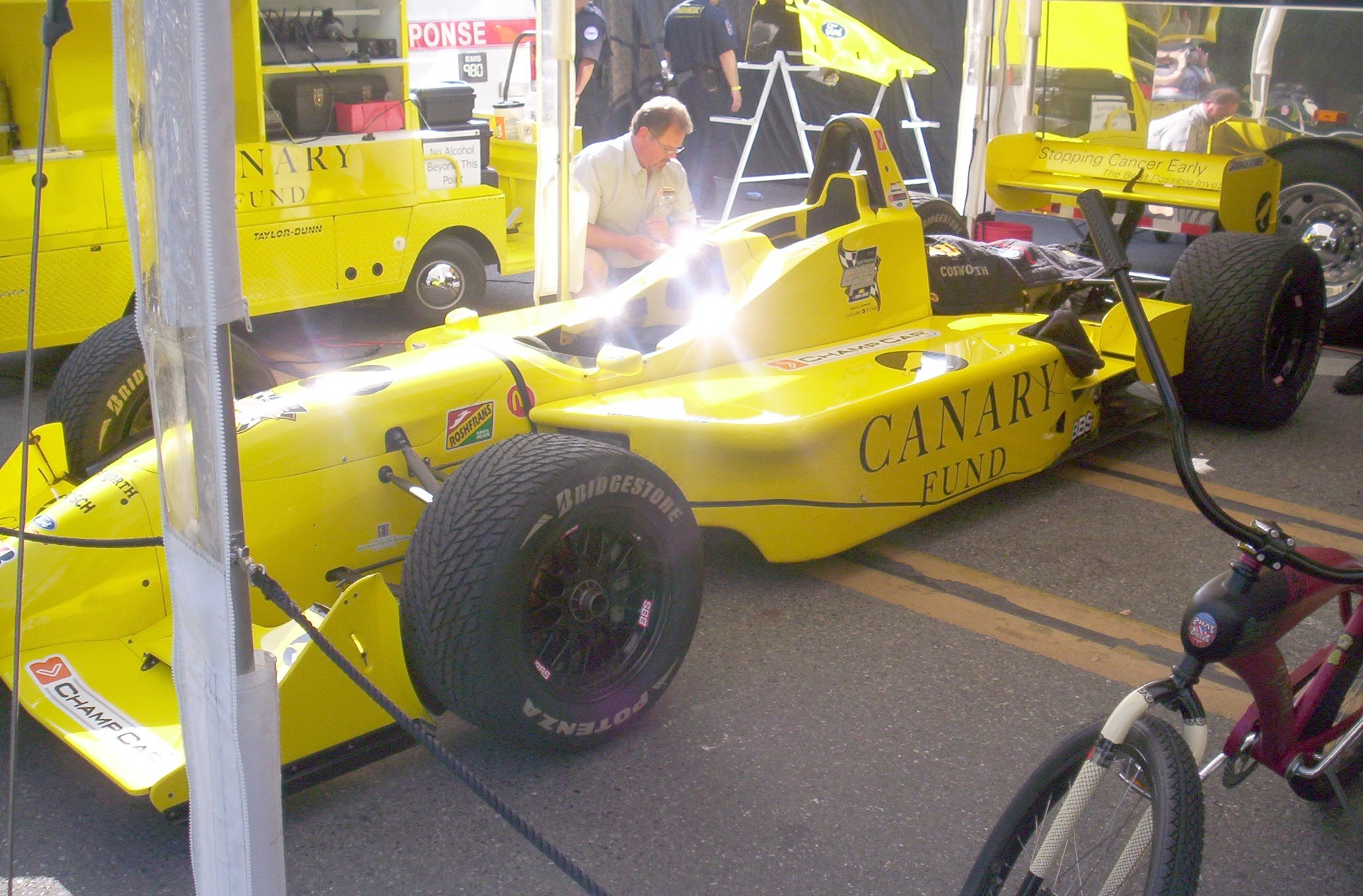
The Canary Fund-sponsored two-seater Champ Car at the 2005 Taylor Woodrow San Jose Grand Prix

The San Jose Grand Prix was an annual street circuit race in the Champ Car World Series in San Jose, California. The race had three different title sponsors over the course of its three-year existence, being known as the Taylor Woodrow Grand Prix of San Jose in 2005, Canary Foundation Grand Prix of San Jose Presented by Taylor Woodrow in 2006, and the San Jose Grand Prix at Redback Raceway in 2007.

== The track ==
Initially the track was designed to run near Downtown San Jose, California, circling around the SAP Center. However, due to higher than expected costs for street repairs and improvements, among other concerns, race organizers moved to a course running directly through downtown.

The course began on Almaden Boulevard running northerly along the southbound lanes of the road crossing VTA light rail tracks at San Carlos St. Just before reaching Santa Clara Street the course reached turn one, an abrupt hairpin that caused the drivers to double back in the southbound direction along Almaden Blvd again in the opposite direction of normal traffic. The course then turned east along Park Avenue at turn two. Turn 3 took the drivers on to Market Street passing Plaza de César Chávez through the shallow chicane of turns four and five again crossing the VTA light rail track. The course then turned right on to Balbach at turn 6. At the final turn 7 the course again turned right back on to Almaden Blvd. The entrance to the pit lane was also at turn 7.

The course was the shortest and tightest track on the Champ Car schedule the three years the San Jose Grand Prix was run.

== Event history ==
=== AAA Championship Car ===
The first championship car race to be held in the San Jose area was the San Jose 100, which was held at the mile-long Santa Clara County Fairgrounds in 1951 and 1952. During the 1952 event, driver Joe James was killed after flipping end-over-end and suffering a fractured skull and internal injuries.

=== Inaugural event ===
2005 track layout

The inaugural event was held July 29–31 in 2005. As the newest addition to the world series, the San Jose race was expected to raise interest in racing in Northern California. Although the Champ Car World Series was the main event, a number of other races were also held. Additionally, a week of fairs, music, charity events and promotional activities also supported the Grand Prix.

The title event of the inaugural Grand Prix was held at 2:00 pm PST on July 31, 2005. It was race #8 of the 2005 Champ Car World Series. Other races included the Trans-Am Series, the Toyota Atlantic Championship, the United States Touring Car Championship, and the Historic Stock Car Racing Series. The weekend also featured the Formula D Drift racing competition.

On race weekend, many critics, including several drivers, criticized the track for being too narrow, too bumpy and dangerous. Some drivers even jokingly compared the track to a motocross track, and somewhat-seriously complained of headaches after several laps. Several modifications were made to the track following initial practice and qualifying sessions, including adding a chicane to the front stretch and moving a grandstand to make room for a bigger run-off area. Still, the crossing of the VTA's light rail tracks on the course actually caused the Champ Cars to bounce and become slightly airborne in a high-speed area of the track.

On race day, the Champ Car race was largely a battle of survival, as half the starting field failed to finish the race, most due to crashing on narrow portions of the track, or mechanical problems caused by the bumpy rail crossings. There was also little on-track passing in the Champ Car race, although many of the support races did see quite a bit of on track passing.

In the end, the event was still considered a success, as official attendance reports showed over 60,000 fans on race day, and total 3-day attendance exceeded 150,000.

=== 2006 changes ===
As a result of the poor quality of racing in 2005, organizers of the San Jose Grand Prix promised that the track would be improved in the future in order to keep the race. For the 2006 event, there were several changes made to the Downtown San Jose Circuit. The biggest change was a pit road/frontstretch swap which put the start finish line closer to the premium Gold seating section, which was obstructed in 2005 by the palm trees on the Almaden Boulevard median. The swap also removed the chicane placed just before the rail crossing, making the stretch from Balbach to the Toyota Hairpin a straight shot. The proceeding left turn onto Park Avenue was widened to allow for more passing. The track at the second rail crossing along Market Avenue was leveled so that there would be no issue of cars 'taking off' again. The right turn from Market onto Balbach was also widened to create another passing opportunity.

The San Jose Grand Prix organizers also had to deal with the decision of the owners of the CCWS to not renew their marketing agreement with the Trans-Am Series and the failure to attract the return of the United States Touring Car Championship. Once the Grand Prix had secured an appearance by the Formula BMW USA series, organizers focused the rest of their budget on off-course attractions to further increase attendance. Their efforts were not successful, as revised attendance figures indicated a paid attendance of 83,248, a substantial decrease from 2005.

=== 2007 event ===
For the 2007 event no on-course changes were made to the track other than general upkeep. However off the course some changes were made which included moving the luxury boxes from atop the main "gold" level seating grandstand at the start/finish line on Almaden Blvd, to track level on the inside of the course on Park Avenue. Also additional general admission seating was added to the course along Almaden Blvd.

On March 9, 2007 San José Grand Prix President Dale Jantzen announced that Redback Networks, an Ericsson company, would be the title sponsor of the 1.443 mile, seven-turn downtown temporary street circuit in 2007, the "Redback Raceway". The event was known as the San Jose Grand Prix at Redback Raceway.

Prior to the race on July 24, Ryan Dalziel, driver of the #28 DP01 for Pacific Coast Motorsports suffered a broken collarbone while training on his bicycle Tuesday morning. As a result of the injury, Dalziel missed the San Jose Grand Prix at Redback Raceway. Dalziel consulted with Dr. Terry Trammell in order to determine his eligibility for round ten of the Champ Car World Series at Road America. Mario Domínguez was announced the next day as his replacement for San Jose.

Race events were held from July 27–29. On course the 2007 event featured races run by the Historic Stock Car Racing Series, Formula D drift competitions, Formula BMW, Atlantic Championship and the marquee running of the Champ Car World Series. Friday and Saturday featured qualifying for the Champ Car race, with Sebastien Bourdais winning the provisional pole on Friday. However the 2007 San Jose Grand Prix pole sitter for the Champ Car race was Justin Wilson from the UK with a run of 49.039 on Saturday. The race was won by Champ Car rookie driver Robert Doornbos from the Netherlands. The Champ Car Atlantic race was won by Jonathan Bomarito.

Final attendance figures released for the Grand Prix showed mixed results when compared to 2006. 3-Day paid attendance was down slightly as was attendance on Saturday to 81,538. However overall attendance was equal to 2006 with about 120,000 people visiting the race over the course of the race weekend. And Sunday race day attendance was actually up slightly from 2006 according to race organizers.

=== 2008 event ===
The 2008 San Jose Grand Prix at Redback Raceway was going to be held on July 25–27, 2008. However, on September 11, 2007 it was announced that the race was canceled and the Northern California Champ Car race would be moving back to Mazda Raceway Laguna Seca. That event was later canceled in February 2008 when Champ Car World Series ceased operations and was merged into the Indy Racing League.

== Attendance ==
Year	Race Day	3-Day Total	3-Day Total Paid
2005 (est.)	60,000	150,000	unknown
2006	67,128	120,192	83,248
2007	68,000	120,000	81,538

== Past winners ==
=== Santa Clara Fairgrounds ===
Season	Date	Race Name	Driver	Team	Chassis	Engine	Race Distance		Race Time	Average Speed (mph)	Ref
Season	Date	Race Name	Driver	Team	Chassis	Engine	Laps	Miles (km)	Race Time	Average Speed (mph)	Ref
1951	October 21	San Jose 100	Tony Bettenhausen	Murrell Belanger	Kurtis	Offy	100	100 (160.934)	1:14:24	81.760	
1952	November 2	San Jose 100	Bobby Ball	McDaniel	Kurtis	Offy	100	100 (160.934)	N/A	N/A	

=== San Jose Street Circuit ===
Season	Date	Driver	Team	Chassis	Engine	Race Distance		Race Time	Average Speed (mph)	Report	Ref
Season	Date	Driver	Team	Chassis	Engine	Laps	Miles (km)	Race Time	Average Speed (mph)	Report	Ref
2005	July 31	(France) Sébastien Bourdais	Newman-Haas	Lola	Ford-Cosworth	93	134.664 (216.72)	1:45:42	76.431	Report	
2006	July 30	(France) Sébastien Bourdais	Newman-Haas	Lola	Ford-Cosworth	97	139.971 (225.261)	1:38:00	85.694	Report	
2007	July 29	(Netherlands) Robert Doornbos	Minardi Team USA	Panoz	Cosworth	107	154.401 (248.484)	1:45:07	88.123	Report	

== Lap records ==
The fastest outright all-time track record set during a race weekend on the original layout is 0:54.243, set by Sébastien Bourdais in a Lola B02/00, during qualifying for the 2005 Taylor Woodrow Grand Prix of San Jose. The fastest outright all-time track record set during a race weekend on the modified layout is 0:48.678 seconds, set by Sebastien Bourdais in a Lola B02/00, during qualifying for the 2006 Canary Foundation Grand Prix of San Jose. The fastest official race lap records at the Grand Prix of San Jose are listed as:

Category	Time	Driver	Vehicle	Event
Modified Grand Prix Circuit (2006–2007): 1.443 mi (2.322 km)
Champ Car	0:49.584	Justin Wilson	Panoz DP01	2007 San Jose Grand Prix at Redback Raceway
Formula Atlantic	0:55.503	Robert Wickens	Swift 016.a	2007 San Jose Formula Atlantic round
Formula BMW	1:02.497	Daniel Morad	Mygale FB02	2007 San Jose Formula BMW USA round
Original Grand Prix Circuit (2005): 1.448 mi (2.330 km)
Champ Car	0:55.083	Sébastien Bourdais	Lola B02/00	2005 Taylor Woodrow Grand Prix of San Jose
Formula Atlantic	1:02.159	David Martínez	Swift 014.a	2005 San Jose Formula Atlantic round
