= Ernie Irvan =

American racing driver (born 1959)

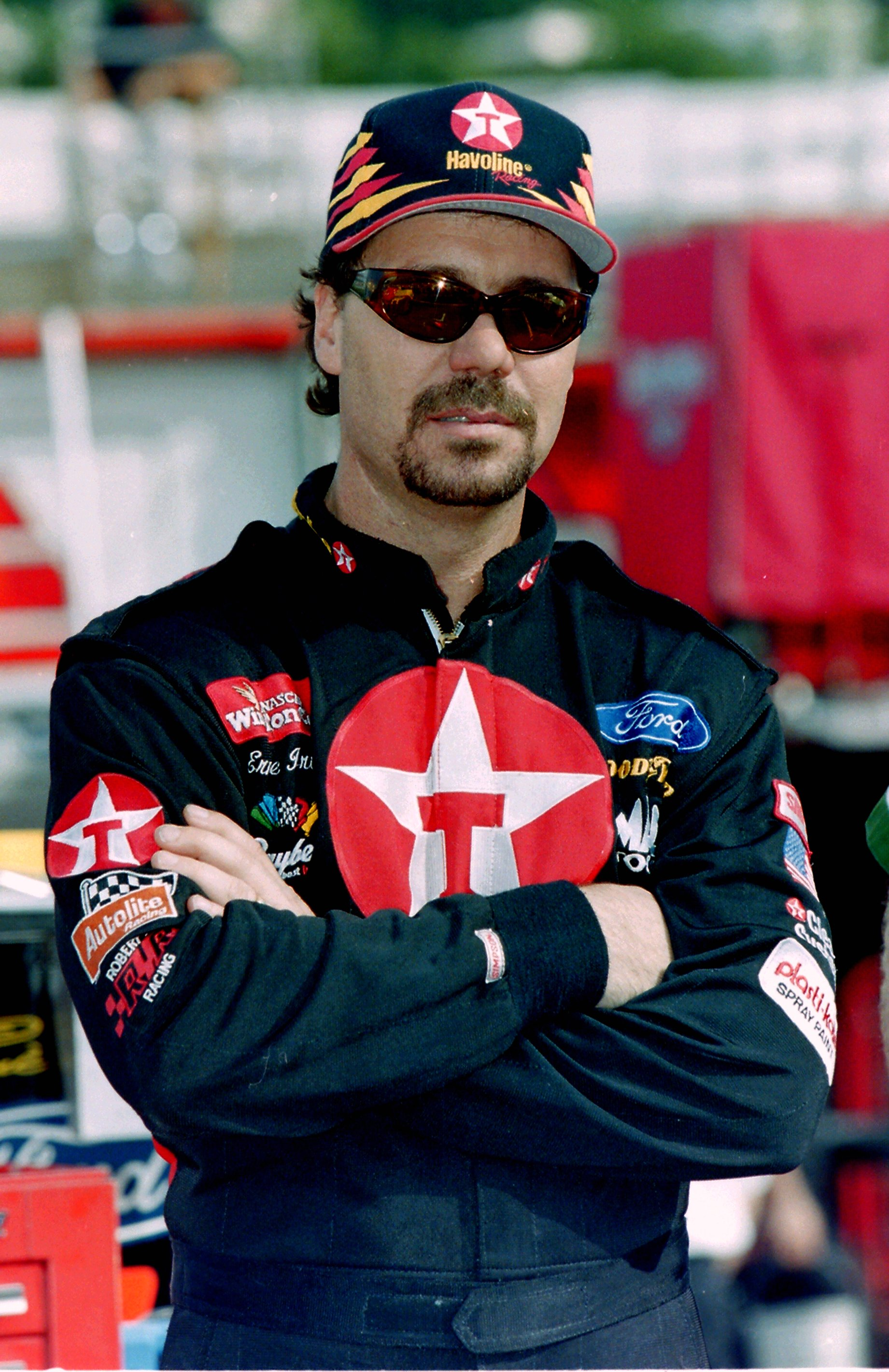
- Irvan in 1997
- Born: Virgil Earnest Irvan; January 13, 1959 (age 67); Salinas, California, U.S.
- Achievements: 1991 Daytona 500 Winner; 1993 Winston 500 Winner; Led Winston Cup Series in poles in 1994
- Awards: 1993 Super Ford Magazine Driver of the Year; 1994 True Value Hard Charger; 1994 Mike Rich Memorial Award; 1994, 1995 Maxwell House Spirit Award; 1995 Winston Cup Scene Top Story of the Year; 1995 Arete Award for Courage in Sports (Professional Division); 1996 Mildred "Babe" Didrikson Zaharias Courage Award; 1996 AP Parts Meet the Challenge Award; Named one of NASCAR's 50 Greatest Drivers (1998); Selected as a torchbearer for the 2002 Olympics; Stock Car Hall of Fame (2002); Voted by MSNBC Top Ten Greatest Sport Comebacks of All Time (2002); West Coast Stock Car Hall of Fame (2005); Named one of NASCAR's 75 Greatest Drivers (2023)

NASCAR Cup Series career
- 313 races run over 12 years
- Best finish: 5th (1991)
- First race: 1987 Wrangler Jeans Indigo 400 (Richmond)
- Last race: 1999 Frontier @ the Glen (Watkins Glen)
- First win: 1990 Busch 500 (Bristol)
- Last win: 1997 Miller 400 (Michigan)
Wins	Top tens	Poles
15	124	22

NASCAR O'Reilly Auto Parts Series career
- 57 races run over 8 years
- Best finish: 28th (1991)
- First race: 1986 All Pro 300 (Charlotte)
- Last race: 1999 MBNA Platinum 200 (Dover)
- First win: 1991 AC-Delco 200 (Rockingham)
- Last win: 1992 Fram Filter 500K (Talladega)
Wins	Top tens	Poles
3	15	5

NASCAR FedEx Freight Truck Series career
- 12 races run over 5 years
- Best finish: 45th (1995)
- First race: 1995 Lowe's 150 (North Wilkesboro)
- Last race: 1999 NAPA 250 (Martinsville)
Wins	Top tens	Poles
0	8	0

Virgil Earnest Irvan (born January 13, 1959), occasionally referred to as Swervin' Irvan, is an American former professional stock car racing driver. A retired NASCAR competitor, he is perhaps best remembered for his comeback after a serious head injury suffered from a crash during practice at Michigan International Speedway in 1994 that left him with only a 10% chance of survival. Irvan has been inducted into numerous halls of fame and was named one of NASCAR's 50 Greatest Drivers in 1998. After a series of injuries in the late 1990s, he retired from racing in 1999.

== Early career ==
Irvan began his racing career driving karts in California in 1968 at the age of nine. He won the California Championship at the age of fifteen. In 1974, Irvan finished second in the country in his class at the national kart championship races. In 1975, Irvan moved up to stock cars at the age of sixteen at Stockton 99 Speedway and was victorious in his first race on asphalt in a semi-main event. From then until 1981 Irvan raced every weekend at Madera and Stockton, California, winning numerous feature events. He missed his high school graduation ceremony to race at Riverside, California. During this time, he lost his best friend, Tim Williamson, in a racing accident at Riverside, several months before he was slated to test in the Winston Cup.

== Early Winston Cup ==
In 1982, Irvan left California with $700 in his pocket and everything he owned loaded into his pickup truck and a homemade trailer, and he headed east to North Carolina. Worried about running out of money, Irvan stopped in Las Vegas and managed to leave with an additional $200.

Irvan supported himself in Charlotte, North Carolina by welding grandstand seats at Charlotte Motor Speedway, unloading Ken Schrader's moving van, building racecars, and other odd jobs. During that time, he won nine races driving in the late model series at Concord Speedway. Driving a Firebird, Irvan won two races his first year and seven races the next year.

Irvan met car-builder Marc Reno and they became partners in their racing ventures. Before long, Irvan made his Winston Cup debut, on September 13, 1987, at Richmond Fairgrounds Raceway driving the No. 56 Chevrolet Monte Carlo. The car, built and prepared by Irvan and Reno, was sponsored by Dale Earnhardt Chevrolet. Irvan qualified twentieth but was sidelined after 35 laps after the car's engine overheated. He finished 29th and won $860. Irvan was noticed by long-time owner and driver D.K. Ulrich and made three additional starts in Ulrich's No. 6 car, finishing fifteenth at Martinsville, 22nd at North Wilkesboro Speedway, and 19th at Riverside. In October, Irvan drove the No. 56, again sponsored by Dale Earnhardt, in his first Winston Cup start at Charlotte, starting 36th, leading lap 128, and finishing eighth.

In 1988, Irvan made a bid for NASCAR Rookie of the Year, driving Ulrich's No. 2 Kroger Chevrolets and Pontiacs. Irvan competed in 25 of the 29 Winston Cup Series events, losing rookie-of-the-year honors to Ken Bouchard by three points (242–239) in the closest battle in Winston Cup history. Irvan's best finish of the year was 11th at Martinsville in September. He finished 26th in the final points standings with winnings for the year totaling $96,370. In 1989, Irvan started all 29 races in his first full year in the Winston Cup Series behind the wheel of Ulrich's U.S. Racing Pontiac. Irvan started 25th at Bristol in April and caught leader Mark Martin after 38 laps. Irvan went on to lead 56 laps before being sidelined in an accident on lap 167. Irvan's sixth-place finish at Martinsville in September gave him his best of four top-ten finishes for the year. Irvan finished 22nd in the final standings for the year with winnings totaling $155,239.

== 1990s success ==
After sponsorship problems plagued Ulrich's team, Irvan left to race for Junie Donlavey, who had procured a sponsorship program with True Cure. True Cure failed to fulfill its financial obligations, and after three races, Irvan was told he could seek other opportunities. He moved over to Morgan-McClure Motorsports' (MMM) No. 4 Kodak Oldsmobile, filling the vacancy left by Phil Parsons. After starting 30th in his first race for the new team (Atlanta in March), Irvan charged to the front and grabbed a third-place finish, the first top-five of his career. The next race, at Darlington Raceway, he became involved in controversy after being involved in an accident that nearly killed Neil Bonnett. Irvan then won his first Winston Cup pole position, at Bristol, in the spring. He won his first Winston Cup race, in the Busch 500 at Bristol, on August 25. Irvan wrapped up the season with three poles, one victory, six top-fives, and thirteen top-tens; he also won $535,280 and finished ninth in the final point standings.

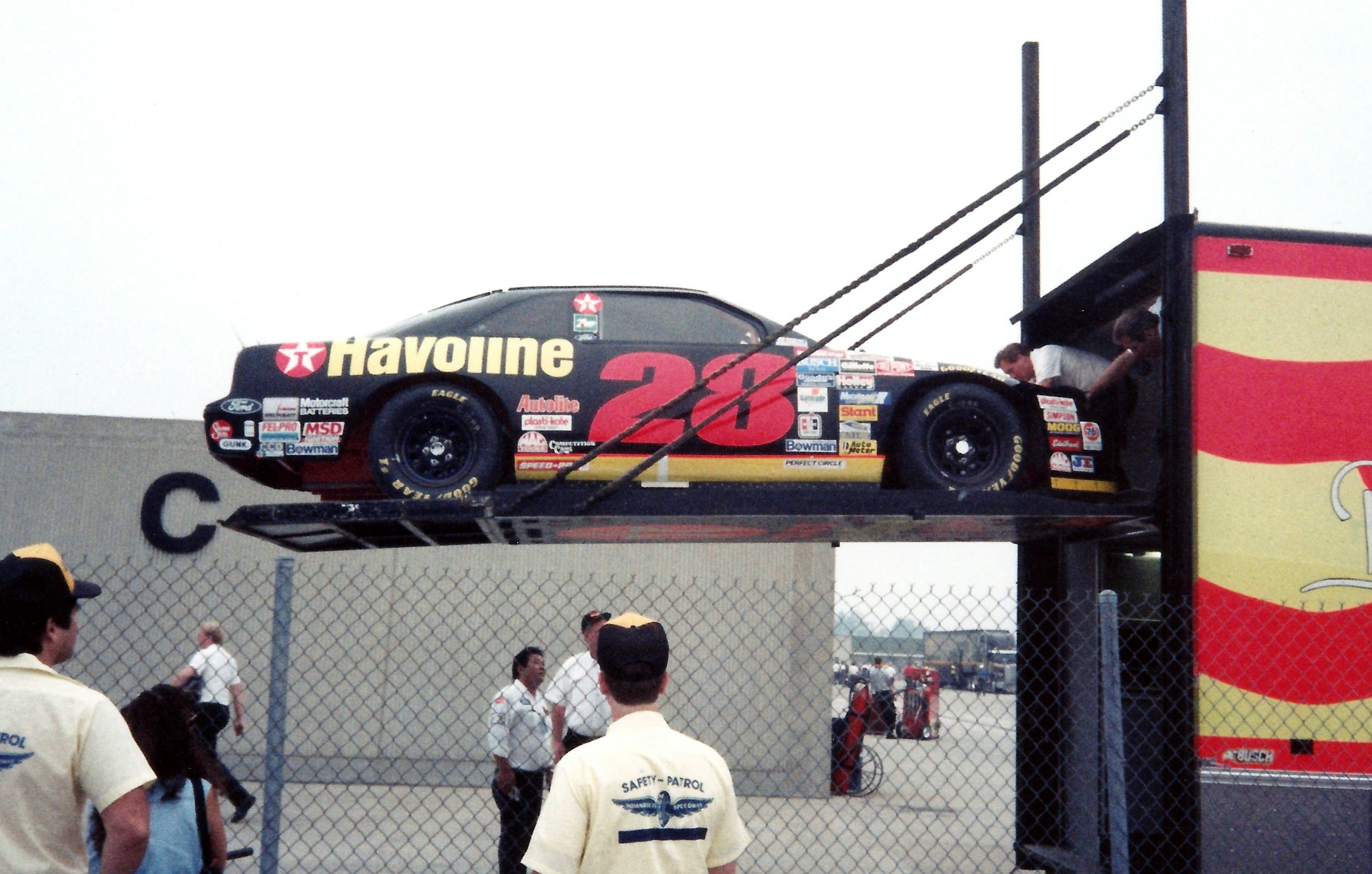
Irvan's car being unloaded from the transporter at Indianapolis Motor Speedway in 1993

In February 1991, Irvan drove the Morgan-McClure Chevrolet to victory in the Daytona 500, stock car racing's most prestigious and then most lucrative race. Four years earlier, Irvan watched the 500 on a borrowed black and white TV while washing cars, one of several jobs he worked to support both his family and his struggling career. Irvan's next victory came later in the season at Watkins Glen International Raceway. The race was marred by the death of popular veteran J. D. McDuffie. Irvan ended the year with two victories, three second-place and four fourth-place finishes among his eleven top-five and nineteen top-ten finishes in 29 starts. He finished the year fifth in Winston Cup driver standings and won $1,079,017. Irvan also picked up his first Busch Grand National Series win in the AC-Delco 200 at Rockingham. During this time, Irvan came under more controversy due to his aggressive driving style, earning him the nickname "Swervin' Irvan" by his fellow competitors. Irvan apologized to his fellow drivers in a televised speech at the driver's meeting before the 1991 Diehard 500 after speaking with Darrell Waltrip and Richard Petty about improving his image.

Irvan's 1992 season was highlighted by three more victories - Sonoma in June; Daytona in July; and Talladega in July. He had three pole positions, nine top-fives, and eleven top-tens, $996,885 in winnings, and finished eleventh in the final season points standing. He scored a pair of Busch Grand National wins at Watkins Glen and Talladega. He suffered a broken collarbone in an accident during a Busch Series race in March at Atlanta and twelve finishes of 24th or worse including seven he did not finish. On November 21, 1992, he married Kim Baker.

=== Moving to Robert Yates Racing ===
Irvan continued his tenure with Morgan-McClure in 1993, adding poles at Dover in June and Daytona in July and a victory at Talladega in May. In total, while driving for Morgan-McClure, Irvan obtained nine poles, seven wins, and 51 top-ten finishes in 105 starts. On July 12, 1993, Irvan experienced a significant personal loss when his friend, Davey Allison, died from injuries sustained in a helicopter crash outside of Talladega. Robert Yates, Allison's team owner, asked Irvan to replace him as the driver of the No. 28 Texaco/Havoline Ford at Robert Yates Racing. Morgan-McClure was unwilling to let Irvan out of his contract with the team, and a lawsuit ensued.

After the night race at Bristol in August, Irvan was released from his duties driving the No. 4 and took over the No. 28 at the Southern 500 at Darlington the next week, where he started tenth and finished fifth. Irvan's first victory with RYR came in his fourth start with the team when he won at Martinsville later that same month. Irvan dedicated his victory that day to Allison and then followed that victory two weeks later with one at Charlotte in which he led all but six laps. Irvan scored five front-row positions (including two poles) and two victories in his nine races that season with RYR. Irvan was ranked ninth in driver standings at the time of his departure from Morgan-McClure, but he rose to sixth in the final standings. At the 1994 Brickyard 400, Irvan was a factor and was leading with five laps to go when a tire puncture forced him to pit and lose a lap.

== Head injury ==
In August 1994, Irvan was a contender for the NASCAR Winston Cup Series Championship throughout the first twenty races of the season. Entering the GM Goodwrench Dealer 400 at Michigan on August 21, Irvan was in a close battle with Dale Earnhardt as the class of the field. They were matched on wins with three each, while Irvan led in top-five finishes and winnings and trailed Earnhardt by 27 points after having led the standings for most of the season. Although only running 20 out of 31 races in the 1994 season, Irvan was ahead of all drivers in miles led.

His contention for the championship ended during a Saturday early-morning practice session at Michigan. Upon seeing how Irvan's car was handling on the track, Irvan's crew chief, Larry McReynolds, instructed Irvan to pit. Irvan decided to run one more lap and subsequently blew a tire.

The #28 careened into the concrete wall exiting turn two at 170 miles per hour (273 km/h). McReynolds, unaware that his driver had crashed, radioed to Irvan that the caution flag had just been displayed at the flag stand. One of the other members of the crew discovered that Irvan had crashed, and McReynolds and several others commandeered the pace car to take a ride over to the scene. Officials on the scene, however, refused to let them near the wreck due to the seriousness of the situation.

Track medical staff tended to Irvan, with a local trauma doctor offering assistance by performing an emergency tracheotomy to help him breathe. Irvan was then airlifted to Saint Joseph's Hospital in nearby Ann Arbor, Michigan, where he was diagnosed with a basilar skull fracture and lung injuries and given only a 10% chance of surviving the night. Irvan clung to life for the first two days. By early September, Irvan was listed in "fair" condition and was removed from ventilator support. A few weeks later, he was deemed well enough to be transferred to the Charlotte Institute of Rehabilitation in Charlotte. A few weeks following the transfer, Irvan appeared and addressed the fans at Charlotte Motor Speedway prior to the start of the Mello Yello 500.

Less than two months later, at the gala NASCAR Awards Banquet in New York, Irvan walked on stage at the Waldorf-Astoria Hotel's Grand Ballroom to receive the True Value Hard Charger Award. Despite missing the final 11 races at the end of the season, Irvan still ranked among the top five for the most laps led. In addition, Irvan tied Geoff Bodine for the most poles won during the season.

== Recovery and comeback ==
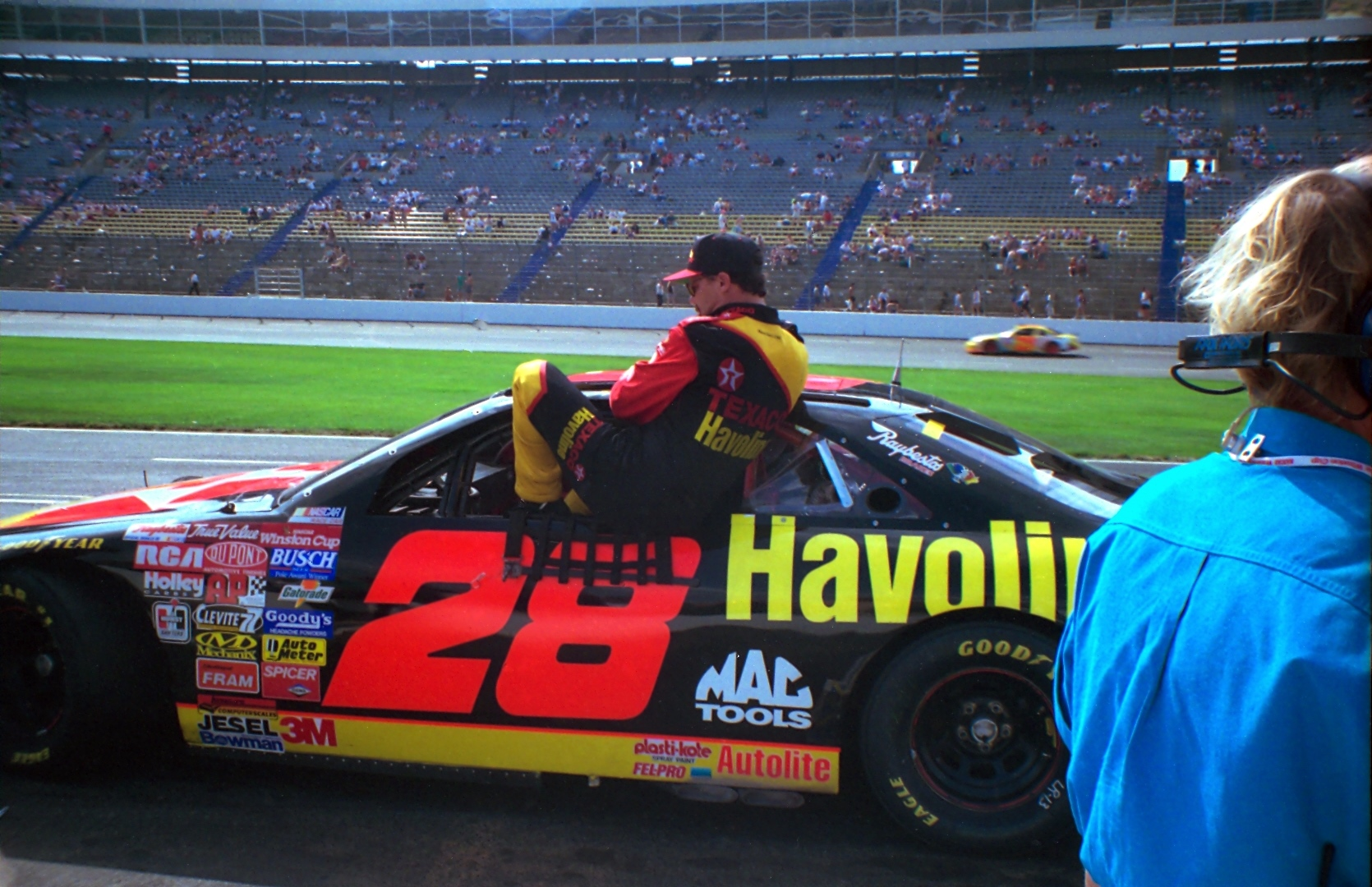
Irvan entering his car at Charlotte Motor Speedway in 1996.

Throughout the first eight months of 1995, Irvan remained focused on returning to Winston Cup racing and did broadcast work for TNN while recovering. He went through rehabilitation and strength training to regain his physical strength. On September 16, NASCAR cleared Irvan for competition. His first attempt at qualifying for a race since his absence, the NASCAR Craftsman Truck Series race at Martinsville in late September, ended when the field was set by points standings after qualifying was rained out.

The following weekend's events at North Wilkesboro Speedway would see Irvan qualify on the outside pole for the Truck Series event. Six laps after the green flag was dropped, Irvan passed pole sitter Mike Skinner for the lead. Irvan led another 23 laps before mechanical problems sidelined him.

That, however, was not the story of the weekend. For the first time since his accident at Michigan, Irvan entered a Winston Cup race. Driving in the No. 88 Texaco Havoline Ford as teammate to Dale Jarrett, who had taken over for Irvan in the #28, Irvan made the race; starting in seventh position, he advanced to third by lap 47 and took the lead on lap 125. He held the lead for 31 laps and finished on the lead lap in sixth position. Irvan started at Phoenix International Raceway a few weeks later but could not stay in the race due to engine failure, but he did lead the most laps despite having to start last in the field due to a crash in practice. He started the season finale at Atlanta Motor Speedway and finished seventh.

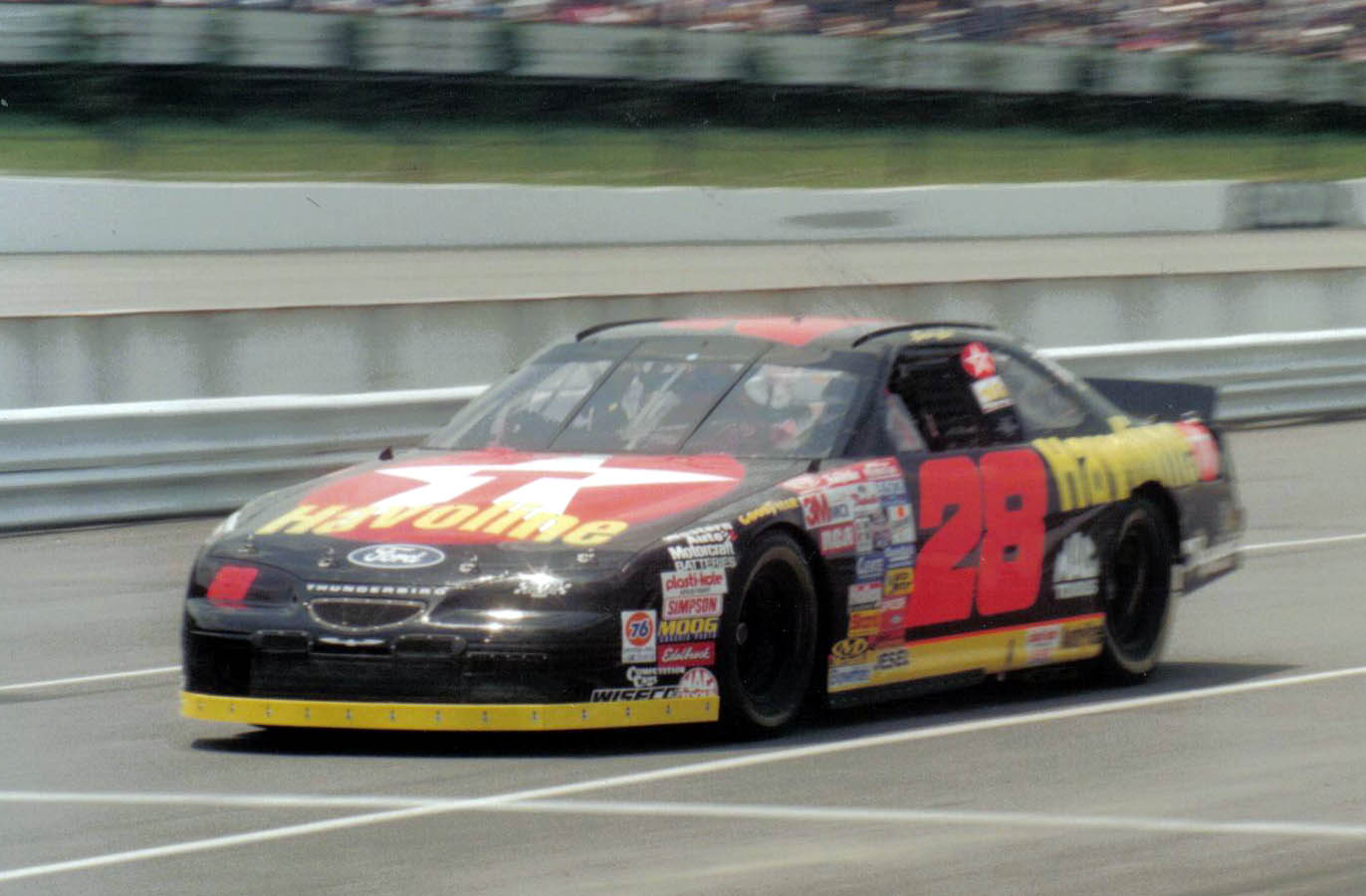
Irvan's car at Pocono in 1997.

For the 1996 season, Irvan moved back into the No. 28 Ford as Jarrett, his substitute, became his full-time teammate in the #88.

Irvan's comeback season started well when he qualified on the front row for the season opening Daytona 500 beside Dale Earnhardt. During Speedweeks, Irvan captured a victory in the 125-mile qualifying race for the Daytona 500. As the season progressed, Irvan won the pole position for the spring race at Talladega, then scored victories at New Hampshire and Richmond. On his way to a top-ten finish in the Winston Cup points standings, he collected twelve top-five and sixteen top-ten finishes, led fifteen of the 31 events, and earned a career-best $1,670,113.

Irvan returned for the 1997 season and notched his fifteenth career win. The victory came in June at Michigan Speedway, the track that nearly claimed his life three years earlier. Irvan ran up five top-five finishes, thirteen top-tens and two pole positions and earned $1,614,281. This would be also be Irvan's final season with Robert Yates. Irvan would be involved in an altercation in Charlotte during Easter weekend where he refused to dance with a female patron and escalated into a fight in the parking lot. In May, Irvan arrived late to a reception dinner thanking Texaco for ten years of support. At the end of the year, Irvan was let go by Robert Yates Racing and replaced by rookie driver Kenny Irwin, Jr.

== Last years in NASCAR and retirement ==
Irvan poses with fans while signing autographs

In 1998, Irvan joined MB2 Motorsports to drive the No. 36 Skittles Pontiac. During the year he scored eleven top-ten finishes with three pole positions despite missing the final three races while recovering from injuries suffered at Talladega in October. Irvan finished the season nineteenth in the Winston Cup points standings, earning $1,476,141. His highlight of 1998 was the birth of his son, Jared, on February 9. Irvan continued driving the No. 36 for MB2 in 1999, but with a different sponsor. M&M Mars (parent corporation of Skittles) decided to emblazon the popular M&Ms characters on the car.

On August 20, exactly five years after his near fatal accident there, Irvan crashed at Michigan while driving his own No. 84 Irvan-Simo Federated Auto Parts Pontiac in a practice session for the Busch Series race. Irvan was again airlifted from the track and was diagnosed with a mild head injury and a bruised lung as a result of the accident.

Two weeks later, on September 3, 1999, surrounded by his wife and two children, Irvan announced his retirement from driving at a tearful press conference in Darlington, South Carolina. While he would fully recover before the end of the 1999 season, the reasoning for his retirement was to prevent future incidents while he had a family to support.

Irvan finished his Winston Cup career as a driver with fifteen victories, 22 poles, 68 top-fives, 124 top-tens and over eleven-million dollars in career earnings.

== After retirement from NASCAR ==
Just before his final years in NASCAR, Irvan briefly co-owned a NASCAR Truck Series team in partnership with Mark Simo and No Fear. The team's first driver was Joe Ruttman, who finished second in points in 1995. The team's next and most famous driver was sports-car racer Boris Said, who drove the #44 Irvan-Simo Racing truck sponsored by Federated Auto Parts. Said's only win was at Sonoma in 1998. The team also fielded a part-time Cup effort with Said in 1999, where Said qualified 2nd at Watkins Glen, led nine laps, but retired with a blown engine.

Afterwards, Irvan announced he was planning to start a Cup team with Mark Simo with sponsorship from Federated Auto Parts, but it never materialized.

After a fire in his house destroyed all of his trophies in March 2000, NASCAR presented Irvan with replicas of the lost trophies.

As of 2007, he is the crew chief on his son Jared's quarter midget. In 2012, Jared won the Quarter Midget Racing Championship and is leading the USAC Ignite Midget Eastern Region championship, and a late model car has been ordered for Jared's planned move into late models. Jared also plans to run the 2015 NASCAR K&N Pro Series East season.

Irvan attended five NASCAR races in 2006, promoting a foundation that he formed called Race2safety as an advocate for head-injury awareness. The foundation promotes awareness and prevention of head injuries, especially among children.

Irvan attended the 50th annual Daytona 500 and was one of the 24 grand marshals giving the command to start the engines.

The Irvan family used to live in Wadmalaw Island, South Carolina, near Charleston, where they owned El Cardenal Farm and organized the Equestrian Club of Charleston. According to Irvan on Dale Earnhardt Jr.'s Dirty Mo Media podcast in September 2020, he and his wife currently live in Ocala, Florida.

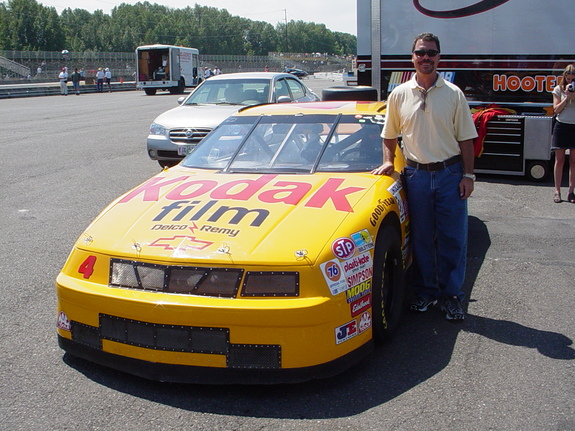
Ernie Irvan with one of his Morgan-McClure Motorsports race winning cars at a Historic Stock Car Racing Series event.

Irvan and his family were featured on NASCAR Now on its "Wayback Wednesday" segment. It featured him and his wife on their ranch in South Carolina.

Irvan was (and still is) recognized on Sirius Satellite Radio's "The Howard Stern Show" by Ronnie "the Limo Driver" Mund, who mentioned Irvan as his favorite NASCAR driver; the drop of Mund saying Irvan's name is still played on the show today and has been featured in multiple prank calls by Sal "the Stock Broker" Governale and Richard "Supertwink" Christy.

In June 2016, Irvan was inducted into the Sonoma Raceway Wall of Fame. He currently helps out his son Jared in his racing career and spends time with his family on their farm.

== Career highlights ==
=== Winston Cup victories (15 career wins) ===
- 1997 (One win) Miller 400 (Michigan)
- 1996 (Two wins) Jiffy Lube 300 (Loudon), Miller 400 (Richmond)
- 1994 (Three wins) Pontiac Excitement 400 (Richmond), Purolator 500 (Atlanta), Save Mart Supermarkets 300 (Sonoma)
- 1993 (Three wins) Winston 500 (Talladega), Goody's 500 (Martinsville), Mello Yello 500 (Charlotte)
- 1992 (Three wins) Save Mart 300K (Sonoma), Pepsi 400 (Daytona), DieHard 500 (Talladega)
- 1991 (Two wins) Daytona 500 (Daytona), Budweiser At The Glen (Watkins Glen)
- 1990 (One win) Busch 500 (Bristol)

=== Busch Series victories (three career wins) ===
- 1992 (Two wins) Fay's 150 (Watkins Glen), Fram Filter 500K (Talladega)
- 1991 (One win) AC-Delco 200 (Rockingham)

== Motorsports career results ==
=== NASCAR ===
(key) (Bold – Pole position awarded by qualifying time. Italics – Pole position earned by points standings or practice time. * – Most laps led.)

==== Winston Cup Series ====
NASCAR Winston Cup Series results
Year	Team	No.	Make	1	2	3	4	5	6	7	8	9	10	11	12	13	14	15	16	17	18	19	20	21	22	23	24	25	26	27	28	29	30	31	32	33	34	NWCC	Pts	Ref
1987	Reno Enterprises	56	Chevy	DAY	CAR	RCH	ATL	DAR	NWS	BRI	MAR	TAL	CLT	DOV	POC	RSD	MCH	DAY	POC	TAL	GLN	MCH	BRI	DAR	RCH; 29	DOV			CLT; 8	CAR								53rd	324	
1987	U.S. Racing	6	Chevy																								MAR; 15	NWS; 22			RSD; 19	ATL						53rd	324	
1988	U.S. Racing	2	Chevy	DAY; DNQ	RCH	CAR; 25	ATL; 18	DAR; 22	BRI; 26			TAL; 32	CLT; 22	DOV; 26	RSD; 31	POC; 37	MCH; 15	DAY; 25	POC; 22	TAL; 32				DAR; 20		DOV; 13												26th	2319	
1988	U.S. Racing	2	Pontiac							NWS; 24	MAR; DNQ										GLN; 29	MCH; 33	BRI; 15		RCH; 28		MAR; 11	CLT	NWS; 26	CAR; 15	PHO; 22	ATL; 18						26th	2319	
1989	U.S. Racing	2	Pontiac	DAY; 41	CAR; 23	ATL; 12	RCH; 9	DAR; 24	BRI; 29	NWS; 10	MAR; 19	TAL; 25	CLT; 15	DOV; 17	SON; 23	POC; 26	MCH; 18	DAY; 23	POC; 26	TAL; 20	GLN; 24	MCH; 25	BRI; 15	DAR; 24	RCH; 26	DOV; 33	MAR; 6	CLT; 33	NWS; 8	CAR; 16	PHO; 33	ATL; 11						22nd	2919	
1990	Donlavey Racing	90	Ford	DAY; 13	RCH; 22	CAR; 29																																9th	3593	
1990	Morgan-McClure Motorsports	4	Olds				ATL; 3	DAR; 32	**BRI**; 16	NWS; 16	MAR; 15	TAL; 4	CLT; 5	DOV; 7	SON; 7	**POC**; 17	MCH; 2	DAY; 33	POC; 26								MAR; 11	NWS; 6										9th	3593	
1990	Morgan-McClure Motorsports	4	Chevy																	TAL; 6	GLN; 28	MCH; 35	BRI; 1	DAR; 2	**RCH**; 12	DOV; 26			CLT; 27	CAR; 9	PHO; 9	ATL; 7						9th	3593	
1991	Morgan-McClure Motorsports	4	Chevy	DAY; 1	RCH; 27	CAR; 6	ATL; 14	DAR; 7	BRI; 2	NWS; 10	MAR; 15	**TAL**; 32	CLT; 7	DOV; 4	SON; 4	POC; 6	MCH; 5	DAY; 5*	POC; 7*	TAL; 33	GLN; 1*	MCH; 7	BRI; 18	DAR; 2	RCH; 4	DOV; 28	MAR; 4	NWS; 33	CLT; 30	CAR; 31	PHO; 6	ATL; 2						5th	3925	
1992	Morgan-McClure Motorsports	4	Chevy	DAY; 28	CAR; 11	RCH; 15	ATL; 25	DAR; 26	BRI; 24	NWS; 13	MAR; 25	**TAL**; 5	CLT; 2	DOV; 4	SON; 1	POC; 19	MCH; 30	DAY; 1*	POC; 37	TAL; 1	GLN; 3*	MCH; 4	**BRI**; 28	DAR; 25	**RCH**; 11	DOV; 11	MAR; 27	NWS; 6	CLT; 6	CAR; 2	PHO; 34	ATL; 29						11th	3580	
1993	Morgan-McClure Motorsports	4	Chevy	DAY; 37	CAR; 3	RCH; 11	ATL; 2	DAR; 22	BRI; 23	NWS; 11	MAR; 32	TAL; 1	SON; 2	CLT; 5	**DOV**; 32	POC; 34	MCH; 3	**DAY**; 7	NHA; 15	POC; 31	TAL; 2	GLN; 15	MCH; 32	BRI; 26														6th	3834	
1993	Yates Racing	28	Ford																						DAR; 5	RCH; 36	DOV; 26	**MAR**; 1*	**NWS**; 3	CLT; 1*	CAR; 6	PHO; 2	ATL; 12					6th	3834	
1994	Yates Racing	28	Ford	DAY; 2*	CAR; 5	RCH; 1*	ATL; 1*	DAR; 6	BRI; 33	**NWS**; 3*	MAR; 2	**TAL**; 2*	**SON**; 1*	CLT; 5	**DOV**; 2*	POC; 7	MCH; 18	DAY; 2*	**NHA**; 30*	POC; 37	TAL; 3*	IND; 17	GLN; 2	MCH; Wth^{†}	BRI	DAR	RCH	DOV	MAR	NWS	CLT	CAR	PHO	ATL				22nd	3026	
1995	Yates Racing	88	Ford	DAY	CAR	RCH	ATL	DAR	BRI	NWS	MAR	TAL	SON	CLT	DOV	POC	MCH	DAY	NHA	POC	TAL	IND	GLN	MCH	BRI	DAR	RCH	DOV	MAR	NWS; 6	CLT	CAR; DNQ	PHO; 40*	ATL; 7				48th	354	
1996	Yates Racing	28	Ford	DAY; 35	CAR; 14	RCH; 38	ATL; 4	DAR; 33	BRI; 16	NWS; 6	MAR; 2	**TAL**; 31	SON; 42	CLT; 9	DOV; 4	POC; 39	MCH; 5	DAY; 5	NHA; 1	POC; 4	TAL; 4	IND; 2	GLN; 35	MCH; 4	BRI; 36	DAR; 7	RCH; 1	DOV; 36	MAR; 12	NWS; 36	CLT; 37	CAR; 4	PHO; 7	ATL; 36				10th	3632	
1997	Yates Racing	28	Ford	DAY; 20	CAR; 9	RCH; 36	ATL; 2	DAR; 21	TEX; 36	BRI; 39	MAR; 31	SON; 8	TAL; 10	CLT; 13*	DOV; 30	POC; 29	MCH; 1	CAL; 37	DAY; 9	NHA; 8	POC; 40	**IND**; 10*	GLN; 21	MCH; 4	BRI; 41	DAR; 33	RCH; 23	NHA; 2	DOV; 9	MAR; 10	CLT; 18	**TAL**; 5	CAR; 28	PHO; 18	ATL; 12			14th	3534	
1998	MB2 Motorsports	36	Pontiac	DAY; 6	CAR; 19	LVS; 30	ATL; 15	DAR; 36	BRI; 20	TEX; 43	MAR; 9	TAL; 6	CAL; 13	CLT; 11	DOV; 9	RCH; 29	MCH; 14	POC; 34	SON; 36	NHA; 20	POC; 9	**IND**; 6	GLN; 33	**MCH**; 6*	BRI; 22	NHA; 28	DAR; 6	RCH; 14	DOV; 8	**MAR**; 8	CLT; 31	TAL; 37	DAY; 8	PHO	CAR	ATL		19th	3262	
1999	MB2 Motorsports	36	Pontiac	DAY; 14	CAR; 29	LVS; 6	ATL; 7	DAR; 24	TEX; 37	BRI; 43	MAR; 22	TAL; 40	CAL; 35	RCH; 33	CLT; 36	DOV; 35	MCH; 7	POC; 8	SON; 30	DAY; 9	NHA; 21	POC; 11	IND; 24	GLN; 41	MCH	BRI	DAR	RCH	NHA	DOV	MAR	CLT	TAL	CAR	PHO	HOM	ATL	40th	1915	
^{†} - Withdrew after getting injured in practice

===== Daytona 500 =====
Year	Team	Manufacturer	Start	Finish
1988	U.S. Racing	Chevrolet	DNQ	
1989	U.S. Racing	Pontiac	33	41
1990	Donlavey Racing	Ford	18	13
1991	Morgan-McClure Motorsports	Chevy	2	**1**
1992	Morgan-McClure Motorsports	Chevy	7	28
1993	Morgan-McClure Motorsports	Chevy	8	37
1994	Yates Racing	Ford	3	2
1996	Yates Racing	Ford	2	35
1997	Yates Racing	Ford	5	20
1998	MB2 Motorsports	Pontiac	10	6
1999	MB2 Motorsports	Pontiac	31	14

==== Busch Series ====
NASCAR Busch Series results
Year	Team	No.	Make	1	2	3	4	5	6	7	8	9	10	11	12	13	14	15	16	17	18	19	20	21	22	23	24	25	26	27	28	29	30	31	32	NBGNC	Pts	Ref
1986	Reno Enterprises	09	Pontiac	DAY	CAR	HCY	MAR	BRI	DAR	SBO	LGY	JFC	DOV	CLT	SBO	HCY	ROU	IRP	SBO	RAL	OXF	SBO	HCY	LGY	ROU	BRI	DAR	RCH	DOV	MAR	ROU	CLT; 27	CAR; 35	MAR		68th	140	
1990	Rodney Franklin	58	Pontiac	DAY; 7	RCH	CAR; 5	MAR	HCY	DAR	BRI	LAN	SBO	NZH	HCY																						42nd	742	
1990	Henderson Motorsports	75	Olds												CLT; 40	DOV; 26	ROU	VOL	MYB	OXF	NHA	SBO	DUB	IRP; 2	ROU	BRI; 27	DAR; 34	RCH	DOV	MAR	CLT	NHA	CAR	MAR		42nd	742	
1991	Ernie Irvan Racing	10	Chevy	DAY; 41	RCH	CAR; 37	MAR	VOL	HCY; 27	DAR; 27	BRI; 22*	LAN	SBO	NZH	CLT; 23	DOV; 13*	ROU	HCY	MYB			NHA; 5	SBO	DUB	IRP	ROU	BRI; 31	DAR; 11	RCH; 10	DOV	CLT; 24	NHA; 36	**CAR**; 1	MAR		28th	1551	
1991	Ernie Irvan Racing	4	Chevy																	GLN; 3	OXF															28th	1551	
1992	Ernie Irvan Racing	4	Chevy	DAY; 2	CAR	RCH	ATL; 36	MAR	DAR	BRI	HCY; 29	LAN	DUB	NZH; 36	CLT; 41	DOV	ROU	MYB	GLN; 1*	VOL	NHA	TAL; 1			MCH; 31						CLT; 39	MAR	CAR; 31	HCY		31st	1237	
1992	Ernie Irvan Racing	4	Olds																				IRP; 5	ROU		**NHA**; 33*	BRI	DAR	RCH; 29*	DOV						31st	1237	
1993	Ernie Irvan Racing	4	Chevy	DAY; 39	CAR	RCH	DAR	BRI					CLT; 2*	DOV	MYB	**GLN**; 36	MLW	TAL; 17	**IRP**; 24*	MCH; 35	NHA	BRI	DAR	RCH	DOV	ROU										39th	901	
1993	Ernie Irvan Racing	4	Olds						**HCY**; 27*	ROU	MAR	NZH																								39th	901	
1993	Ernie Irvan Racing	41	Chevy																								CLT; 32									39th	901	
1993	BACE Motorsports	74	Chevy																									MAR; 9	CAR							39th	901	
1993	Ken Schrader Racing	52	Chevy																											HCY; 27	ATL					39th	901	
1994	Ernie Irvan Racing	28	Ford	DAY; 5	CAR	RCH	ATL; 40	MAR	DAR	HCY	BRI	ROU	NHA; 43	NZH	CLT; 5	DOV; 40	MYB	GLN	MLW; 36	SBO	TAL; 30	HCY	IRP	MCH; 42	BRI	DAR	RCH	DOV	CLT	MAR	CAR					51st	558	
1995	Ernie Irvan Racing	28	Ford	DAY	CAR	RCH	ATL	NSV	DAR	BRI	HCY	NHA	NZH	CLT	DOV	MYB	GLN	MLW	TAL	SBO	IRP	MCH	BRI	DAR	RCH	DOV	CLT	CAR	HOM; DNQ							NA	-	
1997	Phoenix Racing	4	Chevy	DAY	CAR	RCH	ATL	LVS	DAR	HCY	TEX	BRI	NSV	TAL	NHA	NZH	CLT; 28	DOV	SBO	GLN	MLW	MYB	GTY	IRP	MCH	BRI	DAR	RCH	DOV	CLT	CAL	CAR	HOM			101st	79	
1999	Irvan-Simo Racing	14	Pontiac	DAY	CAR	LVS	ATL	DAR	TEX	NSV	BRI	TAL	CAL	NHA	RCH; 39	NZH	CLT	DOV; 34	SBO	GLN	MLW	MYB	PPR	GTY	IRP											107th	107	
1999	Irvan-Simo Racing	84	Pontiac																							MCH; DNQ	BRI	DAR	RCH	DOV	CLT	CAR	MEM	PHO	HOM	107th	107	

==== Craftsman Truck Series ====
NASCAR Craftsman Truck Series results
Year	Team	No.	Make	1	2	3	4	5	6	7	8	9	10	11	12	13	14	15	16	17	18	19	20	21	22	23	24	25	26	27	NCTC	Pts	Ref
1995	Irvan-Simo Racing	28	Ford	PHO	TUS	SGS	MMR	POR	EVG	I70	LVL	BRI	MLW	CNS	HPT	IRP	FLM	RCH	MAR; DNQ	NWS; 30	SON	MMR; 3	PHO; 2								45th	408	
1996	Irvan-Simo Racing	28	Ford	HOM	PHO	POR	EVG	TUS	CNS	HPT	BRI	NZH	MLW	LVL	I70	IRP	FLM	GLN; 25	NSV	RCH	NHA; 5	MAR	NWS	SON	MMR	PHO	LVS; 29				60th	39	
1997	Irvan-Simo Racing	28	Ford	WDW	TUS	HOM	PHO	POR	EVG	I70	NHA	TEX	BRI	NZH	MLW	LVL	CNS	HPT	IRP	FLM	NSV	GLN	RCH; 36	MAR; 2	SON	MMR	CAL; 4	PHO	LVS		52nd	385	
1998	Irvan-Simo Racing	28	Ford	WDW	HOM	PHO	POR	EVG	I70	GLN	TEX	BRI	MLW	NZH	CAL; 2	PPR	IRP	NHA	FLM	NSV	HPT	LVL	RCH; 2	MEM	GTY	MAR	SON	MMR	PHO	LVS	50th	340	
1999	Irvan-Simo Racing	44	Ford	HOM	PHO	EVG	MMR	MAR; 8	MEM	PPR	I70	BRI	TEX	PIR	GLN	MLW	NSV	NZH	MCH	NHA	IRP	GTY	HPT	RCH	LVS	LVL	TEX	CAL			78th	142	

=== ARCA Permatex SuperCar Series ===
(key) (Bold – Pole position awarded by qualifying time. Italics – Pole position earned by points standings or practice time. * – Most laps led.)

ARCA Permatex SuperCar Series results
Year	Team	No.	Make	1	2	3	4	5	6	7	8	9	10	11	12	13	14	15	16	17	APSC	Pts	Ref
1989	Tri-Star Motorsports	18	Pontiac	DAY	ATL	KIL	TAL	FRS	POC	KIL	HAG	POC	TAL	DEL	FRS	ISF	TOL	DSF	SLM	ATL; 1*	105th	-	

Achievements
Preceded by Derrike Cope	Daytona 500 winner 1991	Succeeded by Davey Allison
