= Overseas Automotive Council =

Automobile trade group

The Overseas Automotive Council is a trade group promoting the export of U.S. automobiles.

== History ==
Industry trade group founded in 1923 as the Overseas Automotive Club by a number of U.S. automobile industry executives to promote and develop the export market for their products. The O.A.C. established an international section in 1960, made up of representatives of non-U.S. auto makers seeking closer business contact with the U.S.

In 1992 the organization changed its name to the Overseas Automotive Council and became the international aftermarket division of the Motor & Equipment Manufacturers Association (MEMA).

== See also ==
- Hagley Museum and Library
