= Auto Care Association =

Not-for-profit auto parts trade association

- Established: July 1999
- Type: Trade Association
- Location: 7101 Wisconsin Ave., Suite 1300, Bethesda, MD 20814 United States
- President: Bill Hanvey, President and CEO
- Website: www.autocare.org

The Auto Care Association is a not-for-profit trade association based in Bethesda, Maryland. Auto Care Association's nearly 3,000 members and affiliate companies, represent approximately 150,000 businesses that manufacture, distribute, sell and install motor vehicle parts, accessories, tools, equipment, materials, supplies, and services. Representing suppliers, distributors, retailers, service providers, program groups, manufacturers’ representatives, educators, and publishers, the Auto Care Association protects and advances the interests of businesses providing aftermarket products and services for all classes of motor vehicles.

The Auto Care Association's government affairs department represents the industry's complex set of interests before federal and state legislators and regulators, and advocates for policies that are favorable to member businesses, while their market intelligence experts assess trends that are reshaping the industry. Their international program assists members seeking opportunities in the lucrative global market.

== History ==
Formerly known as the Automotive Aftermarket Industry Association (AAIA), the organization was established in July 1999 upon the consolidation of the Automotive Parts and Accessories Association (APAA) and the Automotive Service Industry Association (ASIA). Their name was changed to Auto Care Association in 2014. Bill Hanvey currently serves as president and CEO of the Auto Care Association. The association’s 2024-2025 board of directors consists of 13 members.

== Communities ==
The Auto Care Association serves as an umbrella organization, supporting various corners of the auto care industry through its professional communities and groups. These include the Automotive Warehouse Distributors Association (AWDA), the Car Care Professionals Network (CCPN), the Filter Manufacturers Community (FMC), the Heavy Duty Distribution Association (HDDA), the Import Vehicle Community, the Manufacturers’ Representatives, the Paint, Body & Equipment Specialists (PBES), Tool & Equipment, and the Upholstery & Trim International (Trim), communities.

In addition, the Auto Care Association supports secondary communities that enhances the individual development of members from primary communities. The secondary communities include the Automotive Content Professionals Network (ACPN), Women in Auto Care, and the Young Auto Care Network Group (YANG).

== Events ==
Auto Care Association is a co-owner of the Automotive Aftermarket Products Expo (AAPEX), the largest annual trade show for automotive aftermarket industry professionals. The AAPEX Show is part of the Automotive Aftermarket Industry Week held during the first week of November at the Venetian Expo and Caeser's Forum in Las Vegas, Nevada. Nearly 161,000 professionals from around the globe participate in Automotive Aftermarket Industry Week (AAIW) which includes the AAPEX Show and SEMA Show.

Co-owned by the Auto Care Association and the Motor & Equipment Manufacturers Association (MEMA), AAPEX represents the $2.3 trillion global automotive aftermarket industry. It features more than 2,500 exhibiting companies, 5,500 booths, 130 AAPEX educational opportunities and approximately 45,000 buyer attendees.

In addition to AAPEX, the Auto Care Association hosts a number of additional events throughout the calendar year including the: Women in Auto Care Summer and Winter Conferences, ACPN Knowledge Exchange, Auto Care Association Spring Leadership Days, YANG Leadership Conference, PBES Annual Conference, Auto Care Association Fall Leadership Days, Upholstery and Trim International Council Convention, the AWDA Conference, and is also a co-owner of HDAW: Heavy Duty Aftermarket Week.

Heavy Duty Aftermarket Week (HDAW) is the largest North American gathering of the independent heavy-duty industry. More than 2,300 executives and managers from the U.S., Canada and six other countries including distributors, suppliers, service providers, educators and industry media attended the 2018 conference in Las Vegas.

== Publications ==
Notable market research publications include the Auto Care Factbook, Auto Care Factbook & Lang Annual, Joint E-Commerce Trends and Outlook Forecast, Collision Repair Trends Report, China Market Report, Mexico Market Report, Tool and Equipment, Auto Care Insider, and the State of Auto Care.

== See also ==
- Trade fair
- Auto mechanic
- Aftermarket (automotive)
- Motor Vehicle Owners' Right to Repair Act
