= Canary Foundation =

Nonprofit organization in the US

The Canary Foundation is a non-profit organization dedicated to discovering highly sensitive and specific biomarkers of early stage cancer and building tests for these markers. The research goal is to be able to identify cancer through a simple blood test, soon after its development, so that treatment has a higher chance of success.

== Partnerships ==
It was founded in 2004 by former Cisco Systems executive vice president Don Listwin. As of 2006, the Science Team included the Nobel Laureate Lee Hartwell, and had partnerships with multiple cancer research centers, including the Fred Hutchinson Cancer Research Center, Stanford University Medical Center, BC Cancer Agency, and University of California, San Francisco Helen Diller Family Comprehensive Cancer Center.

In June 2009, the Canary Foundation, together with Stanford University, committed $20 million to the creation of a research center dedicated to improving cancer early detection.
