= Mosport Trans-Am =

Annual sports car race in Bowmanville, Canada

Mosport Trans-Am Weekend

Trans-Am Series
- Venue: Canadian Tire Motorsport Park
- First race: 1976
- Distance: 100.819 miles (162.252 km)
- Laps: 41
- Most wins (driver): Scott Pruett (4)
- Most wins (manufacturer): Chevrolet (12)

The Mosport Trans-Am race is an annual SCCA Trans-Am Series sports car race held at Canadian Tire Motorsport Park (formerly known as Mosport Park and Mosport International Raceway) in Bowmanville, Ontario, Canada. The first race was held in 1976.

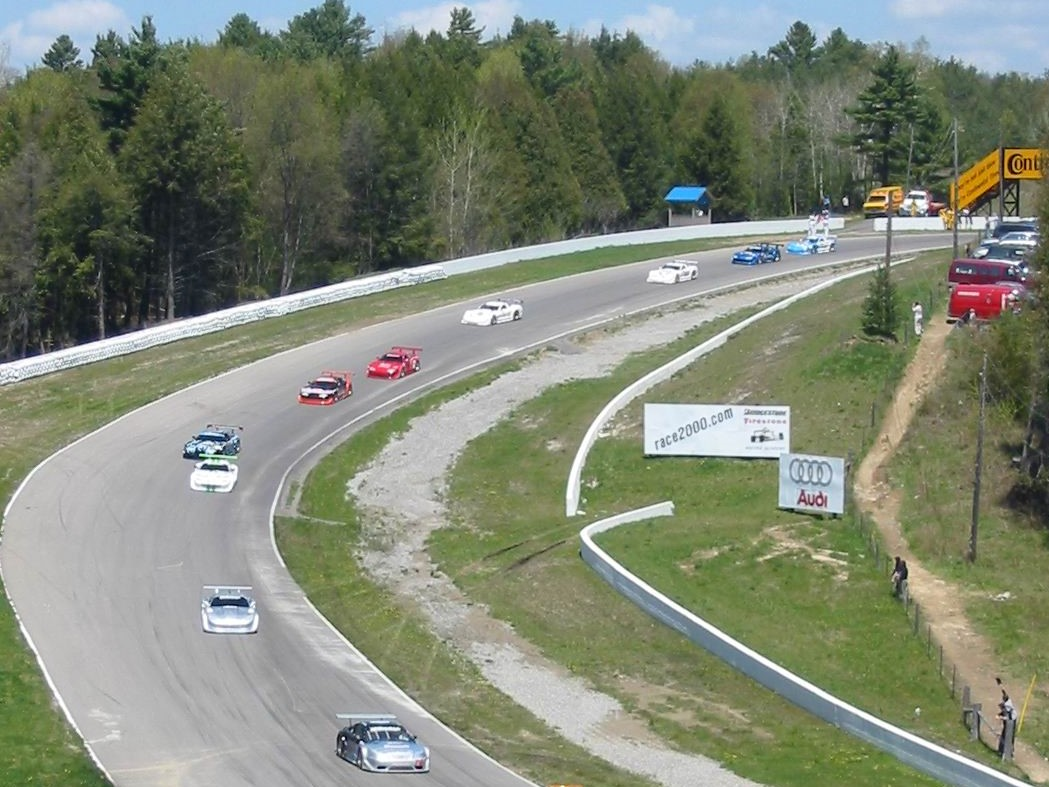
2003 Mosport Trans-Am Race Start

== Winners ==
Year	Date	Drivers	Car	Distance/Duration	Race title	Report
1976	August 21	(Canada) Ludwig Heimrath	Porsche Carrera	41 Laps - 100.819 miles (162.252 km)	Player's Trans-Am	
1977	August 20	(United States) Peter Gregg (France) Bob Wollek	Porsche 934	243 Laps - 597.537 miles (961.643 km)	Molson Diamond Trans-Am	
1978	August 19	(United States) Greg Pickett	Chevrolet Corvette	40 Laps - 99.4 miles (160.0 km)	Molson Diamond Trans-Am	
1979	August 19	(United States) John Paul	Porsche 935	40 Laps - 100 miles (160 km)	Molson Trans-Am	
1980	Race Not Held					
1981	Sept. 12	(United States) Bob Tullius	Jaguar XJS	40 Laps - 98.36 miles (158.30 km)	Swiss Chalet Trans-Am	
1982–1983	Race Not Held					
1984	Sept. 9	(United States) Paul Miller	Porsche Carrera	40 Laps - 98.36 miles (158.30 km)	Budweiser Trans-Am	
1985	Sept. 8	(United States) Wally Dallenbach Jr.	Mercury Capri	40 Laps - 98.36 miles (158.30 km)	Budweiser Trans-Am	
1986	Sept. 14	(United States) Scott Pruett	Mercury Capri	40 Laps - 98.36 miles (158.30 km)	Budweiser 650 Trans-Am	
1987	Sept. 20	(United States) Scott Pruett	Merkur XR4Ti	40 Laps - 98.36 miles (158.30 km)	Rothman's Trans-Am Weekend	
1988	Sept. 25	(United States) Darin Brassfield	Chevrolet Corvette	50 Laps - 122.95 miles (197.87 km)	Rothmans Trans-Am Weekend	
1989	Sept. 24	(Canada) Ron Fellows	Ford Mustang	50 Laps - 122.95 miles (197.87 km)	Rothmans Trans-Am Weekend	
1990	Sept. 9	(United States) Dorsey Schroeder	Ford Mustang	50 Laps - 122.95 miles (197.87 km)	SCCA Trans-Am Weekend	
1991	Sept. 8	(United States) Scott Sharp	Chevrolet Camaro	50 Laps - 122.95 miles (197.87 km)	Liquid Tide Trans-Am	
1992	June 28	(United States) Scott Sharp	Chevrolet Camaro	40 Laps - 98.36 miles (158.30 km)	Erin Maxx Trans-Am Classic	
1993	June 20	(United States) Scott Sharp	Chevrolet Camaro	40 Laps - 98.36 miles (158.30 km)	Player's Ltd. 200 Weekend	
1994	May 22	(United States) Scott Pruett	Chevrolet Camaro	40 Laps - 98.36 miles (158.30 km)	Hy & Zel's Trans-Am	
1995	May 21	(United States) Dorsey Schroeder	Ford Mustang	40 Laps - 98.36 miles (158.30 km)	Trans-Am Classic Weekend	
1996	May 19	(United States) Paul Gentilozzi	Chevrolet Camaro	40 Laps - 98.36 miles (158.30 km)	The Sunoco Ultra94 Trans-Am Weekend	
1997	Aug. 31	(United States) Tommy Kendall	Ford Mustang	40 Laps - 98.36 miles (158.30 km)	Mosport Festival	Report
1998	Race Not Held					
1999	May 23	(United States) Brian Simo	Ford Mustang	40 Laps - 98.36 miles (158.30 km)	BFGoodrich Trans-Am	
2000	May 21	(United States) Brian Simo	Qvale Mangusta	40 Laps - 98.36 miles (158.30 km)	Mosport Victoria Day Weekend	
2001	May 20	(United States) Paul Gentilozzi	Jaguar XKR	50 Laps - 121.344 miles (195.284 km)	Kenwood Communications Presents The Auto Parts Plus Victoria Day Trans-Am Weekend	
2002	May 19	(United States) Boris Said	Panoz Esperante	41 Laps - 100.819 miles (162.252 km)	The Victoria Day Trans-Am Weekend	
2003	May 18	(United States) Scott Pruett	Jaguar XKR	41 Laps - 100.819 miles (162.252 km)	The Victoria Day Trans-Am Weekend	
2004–2005	Race Not Held					
2006–2008	Series Not Held					
2009	May 17	(Puerto Rico) Jorge Diaz Jr	Jaguar XKR		Victoria Day SpeedFest Weekend	
2010	May 23	(Canada) Kenny Wilden	Chevrolet Corvette		Victoria Day SpeedFest Weekend	
2011	May 22	(United States) Tony Ave	Chevrolet Corvette	41 Laps - 100.819 miles (162.252 km)	Victoria Day SpeedFest Weekend	
2012	May 20	(United States) Doug Peterson	Chevrolet Corvette	41 Laps - 100.819 miles (162.252 km)	Victoria Day SpeedFest Weekend	
2013	May 19	(United States) Doug Peterson	Chevrolet Corvette	41 Laps - 100.819 miles (162.252 km)	Castrol presents the Victoria Day SpeedFest Weekend	
2014	May 18	(Canada) Ron Fellows	Chevrolet Corvette	41 Laps - 102.049 miles (164.232 km)	Castrol presents the Victoria Day SpeedFest Weekend	
2015–2020	Race Not Held					
2021	Sept. 5	Canceled due to the COVID-19 pandemic				
2022–2023	Race Not Held					
2024	Aug. 31	(United States) Paul Menard	Ford Mustang	41 Laps - 102.049 miles (164.232 km)	Labour Day Weekend Sprints	

== See also ==
- Grand Prix of Mosport
- Chevrolet Silverado 250
- Mosport 200
- Mosport Can-Am
- Canadian Grand Prix
- Canadian Motorcycle Grand Prix
- Telegraph Trophy 200 / Molson Diamond Indy
