= Circuit Trois-Rivières =

Race track in Quebec, Canada

Grand Prix de Trois-Rivières

- Location: Terrain de l'Exposition (fairgrounds) Trois-Rivières, Quebec, Canada; 46°20′51″N 72°33′31″W
- First race: 1967
- Previous names: Grand Prix Molson de Trois-Rivières; Grand Prix Labatt de Trois-Rivières; Grand Prix Player's Ltee de Trois-Rivières

Circuit information
- Length: 1.521 mi (2.448 km)
- Turns: 11
- Lap record: 0:58.2962 ( (France) Tristan Vautier, Dallara IPS, 2012, Indy Lights)

The Circuit Trois-Rivières is a street circuit in Trois-Rivières, Quebec, Canada. The circuit has been the home of the annual Grand Prix de Trois-Rivières (GP3R), the longest-running street race in North America, since 1967. The circuit is located on the Terrain de l'Exposition (fairgrounds) and is unusual in that it passes through Porte Duplessis, the narrow concrete gateway of the grounds at turn 3.

Throughout its history the circuit has hosted numerous major North American racing series including the American Le Mans Series, the Grand-Am Rolex Sports Car Series, the Trans-Am Series, Can-Am, Indy Lights and Formula Atlantic.

The Grand Prix has been headlined by the NASCAR Canada Series since 2007 (except 2020), and from 2014 until 2019 it was expanded to two weekends when it was joined by the FIA World Rallycross Championship and its World RX of Canada race. In 2026, the Grand Prix was expanded back to two weekends when the RallyX Americas league raced at the track for the first time.

Rallycross layout of Circuit Trois-Rivières

== Lap records ==
As of August 2022, the fastest official race lap records at Circuit Trois-Rivières are listed as:

Category	Time	Driver	Vehicle	Event
Grand Prix Circuit (1986–present): 2.460 km (1.529 mi)
Indy Lights	0:58.2962	Tristan Vautier	Dallara IPS	2012 Grand Prix de Trois-Rivières
Formula Atlantic	0:59.022	Jonathan Summerton	Swift 016.a	2009 Le Grand-Prix de Trois-Rivières
LMP900	0:59.265	Marco Werner	Audi R8	2003 Grand Prix de Trois-Rivières
LMP675	0:59.995	Butch Leitzinger	Lola EX257 AER	2003 Grand Prix de Trois-Rivières
Star Mazda	1:01.161	Jack Hawksworth	Star Formula Mazda 'Pro'	2012 Trois-Rivières Star Mazda Championship round
Prototype Lites	1:02.143	Austin Versteeg	Élan DP02	2016 Grand Prix de Trois-Rivières
LMP3	1:02.430	Kenton Koch	Ligier JS P3	2017 Grand Prix de Trois-Rivières
Mazda Prototype Challenge	1:03.341	Kyle Masson	Élan DP02	2017 Grand Prix de Trois-Rivières
Trans-Am	1:03.762	Ron Fellows	Ford Mustang	1997 Trois-Rivières Trans-Am round
Porsche Carrera Cup	1:04.163	Scott Hargrove	Porsche 991 (991 II) GT3 Cup	2017 Trois-Rivières IMSA GT3 Cup Challenge Canada round
GT1 (GTS)	1:04.201	Johnny O'Connell	Chevrolet Corvette C5-R	2002 Grand Prix de Trois-Rivières
GT	1:04.956	Sascha Maassen	Porsche 911 GT3-R (996)	2003 Grand Prix de Trois-Rivières
Ferrari Challenge	1:07.020	Benoit Bergeron	Ferrari 488 Challenge	2021 Trois-Rivières CTCC round
AGT	1:07.335	Doug Goad	Chevrolet Corvette	2001 Le Grand Prix de Trois-Rivières
GTO	1:07.572	Terry Borcheller	Saleen Mustang	2000 Le Grand Prix de Trois-Rivières
GT4	1:07.947	Romain Monti	Mercedes-AMG GT4	2022 Trois-Rivières Sports Car Championship Canada round
GTU	1:08.268	Andy Pilgrim	BMW M3	2000 Le Grand Prix de Trois-Rivières
TCR Touring Car	1:08.485	Jean-François Hevey	Audi RS 3 LMS TCR (2021)	2022 Trois-Rivières Sports Car Championship Canada round
Super Touring	1:10.105	Peter Hardman	Honda Accord	1996 Trois-Rivières NATCC round
SGS	1:11.588	David Haskell	Porsche 911 Cup (996)	2001 Le Grand Prix de Trois-Rivières
Grand Prix Circuit (1978–1985): 3.380 km (2.100 mi)
Can-Am	1:25.667	Michael Roe	VDS-004	1984 Trois-Rivières Can-Am round
Formula Atlantic	1:27.592	Howdy Holmes	March 79B	1979 Grand-Prix Molson de Trois-Rivieres
Trans-Am	1:33.583	Willy T. Ribbs	Mercury Capri	1985 Trois-Rivières Trans-Am round
Grand Prix Circuit (1974–1977): 2.414 km (1.500 mi)
Can-Am	1:03.332	Peter Gethin	Lola T333CS	1977 Trois-Rivières Can-Am round
Formula Atlantic	1:04.848	Gilles Villeneuve	March 76B	1976 Grand-Prix Labatt de Trois-Rivieres
Trans-Am	1:10.311	George Follmer	Porsche 934	1976 Mayor's Cup
Grand Prix Circuit(1971–1972): 2.092 km (1.300 mi)
Formula Atlantic	1:00.400	Brian Robertson	Chevron B20	1972 Grand-Prix Labatt de Trois-Rivieres

== Events ==
Current

- August: NASCAR Canada Series, Super Production Challenge, F1600 Canada, Radical Cup Canada

Future

- Formula Regional Americas Championship (2027)
- Trans-Am Series (1976, 1979–1985, 1990–1999, 2002–2004, 2011, 2027)

Former

- American Le Mans Series (2002–2003)
- Americas Rallycross Championship (2018–2019)
- Atlantic Championship (1974–1983, 1985, 1989–2003, 2008–2009)
- Can-Am Series (1977–1984)
- Canadian Touring Car Championship (2007–2019, 2021)
- CASCAR Super Series (2001, 2006)
- FIA World Rallycross Championship
  - World RX of Canada (2014–2019)
- IMSA GT3 Cup Challenge Canada (2013–2018)
- IMSA Prototype Challenge (2016–2017)
- Indy Lights (1996–1998, 2011–2012)
- Mazda MX-5 Cup (2006–2008)
- KONI Sports Car Challenge (2001, 2005–2010)
- North American Touring Car Championship (1996)
- Pro Mazda Championship (2005–2013)
- Rolex Sports Car Series (2000–2001)
- SCCA Spec Racer Ford Pro Series (2011)
- SCCA Super Vee Gold Cup (1984)
- Speed World Challenge (1993–1999, 2002)
- Sports Car Championship Canada (2022–2024)

== Past winners ==
=== American Le Mans Series ===
Year	Date	LMP900 Winning Team	LMP675 Winning Team	GTS Winning Team	GT Winning Team	Results
Year	Date	LMP900 Winning Drivers	LMP675 Winning Drivers	GTS Winning Drivers	GT Winning Drivers	Results
2002	Aug 3	(Germany) #2 Audi Sport North America	(United States) #56 Team Bucknum Racing	(United States) #4 Corvette Racing	(United States) #23 Alex Job Racing	Results
2002	Aug 3	(Denmark) Tom Kristensen (Italy) Rinaldo Capello	(United States) Jeff Bucknum (United States) Chris McMurry (United States) Bryan Willman	(United States) Andy Pilgrim (United States) Kelly Collins	(Germany) Sascha Maassen (Germany) Lucas Luhr	Results
2003	Aug 3	(Germany) #1 Infineon Team Joest	(United States) #37 Intersport Racing	(United States) #4 Corvette Racing	(United States) #23 Alex Job Racing	Results
2003	Aug 3	(Germany) Frank Biela (Germany) Marco Werner	(United States) Jon Field (United States) Duncan Dayton	(United States) Kelly Collins (United Kingdom) Oliver Gavin	(Germany) Sascha Maassen (Germany) Lucas Luhr	Results

=== Can-Am Series ===
Year	Date	Drivers	Team	Car	Distance/Duration	Report
1977	Sept 4	(France) Patrick Tambay	(United States) Carl A. Haas Racing Team	Lola-Chevrolet	66 Laps	
1978	Sept 4	(United States) Elliot Forbes-Robinson	(United States) Newman-Freeman Racing	Spyder-Chevrolet	42 Laps	
1979	Sept 4	(United States) Elliot Forbes-Robinson	(United States) Newman-Freeman Racing	Spyder-Chevrolet	42 Laps	
1980	Aug 24	(France) Patrick Tambay	(United States) Carl A. Haas Racing Team	Lola-Chevrolet	42 Laps	
1981	Sept 6	(United States) Al Holbert	(United States) Holbert Racing	Holbert-Chevrolet	42 Laps	
1982	Sept 5	(United States) Al Holbert	(Belgium) Racing Team VDS	VDS-Chevrolet	60 Laps	
1983	Sept 4	(Canada) Jacques Villeneuve, Sr.	(Canada) Canadian Tire Racing	Frissbee-Chevrolet	60 Laps	
1984	Sept 2	(United Kingdom) Jim Crawford	(United States) RK Racing/United Breweries	March-Chevrolet	60 Laps	

=== CASC/SCCA/CART/IMSA Atlantic Championship ===
Year	Date	Driver	Car	Distance	Report
1974	Sept. 1	(United States) Tom Klausler	Lola T360/Ford BDA	60 laps	
1975	Aug. 31	(Italy) Vittorio Brambilla	March 75B/Ford BDA	60 laps	
1976	Sept. 5	(Canada) Gilles Villeneuve	March 76B/Ford BDA	60 laps	
1977	Sept. 4	(United States) Price Cobb	March 77B/Ford BDN	60 laps	
1978	Sept. 3	(Canada) Bill Brack	March 78B/Ford BDN	21 laps	
1979	Sept. 2	(United States) Howdy Holmes	March 79B/Ford BDD	42 laps	
1980	Aug. 24	(United States) Price Cobb	March 80A/Ford BDD	48 laps	
1981	Sept. 6	(Canada) Jacques Villeneuve, Sr.	Unknown	Unknown	
1982	Sept. 5	(Brazil) Roberto Moreno	Ralt=Ford RT4	48 laps	
1983	Sept. 4	(United States) Michael Andretti	Unknown	Unknown	
1985	Sept. 1	(United States) Dan Marvin	Unknown	Unknown	
1989	Aug. 27	(Canada) Jacques Villeneuve, Sr.	Unknown	Unknown	
1990	Aug. 19	(United States) Brian Till	Unknown	Unknown	
1991	Aug. 18	(Canada) Jacques Villeneuve, Sr.	Swift DB-4/Toyota	50 laps	
1992	Aug. 16	(United States) Chris Smith	Swift DB-4/Toyota	50 laps	
1993	Aug. 15	(Canada) David Empringham	Ralt RT-40/Toyota	50 laps	
1994	Aug. 7	(Canada) David Empringham	Ralt RT-41/Toyota	50 laps	
1995	Aug. 6	(Canada) David Empringham	Unknown/Toyota	30 laps	
1995	Aug. 7	(United States) Richie Hearn	Unknown/Toyota	30 laps	
1996	Aug. 3	(Canada) Patrick Carpentier	Ralt RT-41/Toyota	30 laps	
1996	Aug. 4	(Canada) Patrick Carpentier	Ralt RT-41/Toyota	30 laps	
1997	Aug. 7	(Canada) Alex Tagliani	Ralt RT-40/Toyota	45 laps	
1998	Aug. 2	(Canada) Alex Tagliani	Swift 008.a/Toyota	45 laps	
1999	Aug. 1	(United States) Anthony Lazzaro	Swift 008.a/Toyota	45 laps	
2000	July 30	(United States) Buddy Rice	Swift 008.a/Toyota	45 laps	
2001	Aug. 5	(Brazil) Hoover Orsi	Swift 008.a/Toyota	45 laps	
2002	Aug. 4	(Canada) Michael Valiante	Swift 014.a/Toyota	45 laps	
2003	Aug. 3	(United States) A. J. Allmendinger	Swift 014.a/Toyota	45 laps	
2008	Aug. 17	(United States) Jonathan Bomarito	Swift 016.a/Mazda	45 laps	
2009	Aug. 16	(Switzerland) Simona de Silvestro	Swift 016.a/Mazda	50 laps	

=== SCCA Formula Super Vee Championship ===
Year	Date	Driver	Report
1984	Sept. 2	(Netherlands) Arie Luyendyk	

=== Grand American Road Racing Championship ===
Year	Date	SR Winning Team	SR II Winning Team	GTO Winning Team	GTU Winning Team	AGT Winning Team
Year	Date	SR Winning Drivers	SR II Winning Drivers	GTO Winning Drivers	GTU Winning Drivers	AGT Winning Drivers
2000	July 30	(United States) #16 Dyson Racing	(United States) #22 Archangel Motorsport Services	(United States) #5 Saleen-Allen Speedlab	(United States) #50 Genesis Racing	(United States) #09 The Spirit of Daytona
2000	July 30	(United Kingdom) James Weaver (United States) Butch Leitzinger	(United States) Larry Oberto (United States) Ryan Hampton	(United States) Terry Borcheller (United States) Ron Johnson	(United States) Rick Fairbanks (United States) Andy Pilgrim	(United States) Doug Goad (United States) Craig Conway

Year	Date	SRP Winning Team	SRP II Winning Team	GTS Winning Team	GT Winning Team	AGT Winning Team	SGS Winning Team
Year	Date	SRP Winning Drivers	SRP II Winning Drivers	GTS Winning Drivers	GT Winning Drivers	AGT Winning Drivers	SGS Winning Drivers
2001	Aug 5	(United States) #16 Dyson Racing	(United States) #88 Porschehaus Racing	(United States) #5 Fordahl Motorsports	(United States) #34 Zip/Pumpelly Racing	(United States) #09 Team X-1R	(United States) #65 SpeedSource
2001	Aug 5	(United Kingdom) James Weaver (United States) Butch Leitzinger	(Canada) Stephane Veilleux (Canada) Jean-Francois Dumoulin	(United States) Chris Bingham (United States) Ron Johnson	(United States) Spencer Pumpelly	(United States) Doug Goad (United States) Craig Conway	(United States) Selby Wellman (United States) David Haskell

=== NASCAR Canada Series ===
Year	Date	Driver	Team	Car	Distance/Duration	Report
2007	Sept 4	(Canada) Kerry Micks	Beyond Digital Imaging	Ford	41 Laps	
2008	Aug 17	(Canada) Andrew Ranger	Wal-Mart / Tide	Ford	46 Laps	
2009	Aug 17	(Canada) Andrew Ranger	Wal-Mart / Tide	Ford	43 Laps	
2010	Aug 15	(Canada) Andrew Ranger	Dodge Dealers of Quebec	Dodge	42 Laps	
2011	Aug 7	(Canada) Robin Buck	Quaker State/Durabody	Dodge	44 Laps	
2012	Aug 7	(Canada) Andrew Ranger	Dodge/GC Motorsports	Dodge	44 Laps	
2013	Aug 11	(Canada) D. J. Kennington	Castrol Edge/Mahindra Tractors	Dodge	46 Laps	
2014	Aug 10	(Canada) L.P. Dumoulin	WeatherTech Canada/Bellemare	Dodge	51 Laps	
2015	Aug 2	(Canada) Kevin Lacroix	Lacroix Tuning/Excellence Chrysler	Dodge	50 Laps	
2016	Aug 14	(Canada) Kevin Lacroix	Bumper to Bumper/Total/Go Fast	Dodge	50 Laps	
2017	Aug 13	(Canada) Alex Tagliani	Epipen/Lowe's/St. Hubert/Fast Wheels	Dodge	54 Laps	
2018	Aug 12	(Canada) Alex Tagliani	Epipen/Rona/St. Hubert/Spectra Premium	Chevrolet	50 Laps	
2019	Aug 11	(Canada) L.P. Dumoulin	WeatherTech/Bellemare/Eibach	Dodge	50 Laps	
2021	Aug 15	(Canada) Alex Tagliani	RONA / Viagra / St. Hubert	Chevrolet	60 Laps	
2022	Aug 7	(Canada) Alex Guenette	Motos Illimitees / DLGL	Ford	64 Laps	
2023	Aug 6	(Canada) Marc-Antoine Camirand	GM Paille / Chevrolet Canada	Chevrolet	60 Laps	
2024	Aug 11	(Canada) Marc-Antoine Camirand	GM Paille / Chevrolet Canada	Chevrolet	72 Laps	
2025	Aug 10	(Canada) Andrew Ranger	GM Paille / Chevrolet Canada	Chevrolet	63 Laps	

=== Trans-Am Series ===
Year	Date	Drivers	Car	Distance/Duration	Race title	Report
1976	Sept 5	(United States) George Follmer	Porsche Carrera	45 Laps - 108.6 km (67.5 mi)	Le Grand Prix de Trois-Rivières	
1979	Sept 1	(United States) John Paul, Sr.	Porsche 935	45 Laps - 108.6 km (67.5 mi)	Le Grand Prix de Trois-Rivières	
1980	Aug 23	(United States) Roy Woods	Chevrolet Camaro	35 Laps - 118.3 km (73.5 mi)	Le Grand Prix Molson de Trois-Rivières	
1981	Sept 6	(Canada) Eppie Wietzes	Chevrolet Corvette	35 Laps - 118.3 km (73.5 mi)	Le Grand Prix Molson de Trois-Rivières	
1982	Sept 5	(United States) Elliott Forbes-Robinson	Pontiac Trans Am	35 Laps - 118.3 km (73.5 mi)	Le Grand Prix Labatt de Trois-Rivières	
1983	Sept 4	(United States) John Paul Jr.	Chevrolet Camaro	35 Laps - 118.3 km (73.5 mi)	Le Grand Prix Labatt de Trois-Rivières	
1984	Sept 2	(United States) Tom Gloy	Mercury Capri	35 Laps - 118.3 km (73.5 mi)	Le Grand Prix Labatt de Trois-Rivières	
1985	Sept 1	(United States) Willy T. Ribbs	Mercury Capri	40 Laps - 135 km (84 mi)	Le Grand Prix Labatt de Trois-Rivières	
1990	Aug 19	(United States) Tommy Kendall	Chevrolet Beretta	50 Laps - 130 km (80 mi)	Grand Prix de Trois-Rivières	
1991	Aug 18	(United States) Scott Sharp	Chevrolet Camaro	50 Laps - 121.2 km (75.3 mi)	Le Grand Prix Player's Ltee de Trois-Rivières	
1992	Aug 16	(United States) Jack Baldwin	Chevrolet Camaro	50 Laps - 121.2 km (75.3 mi)	Le Grand Prix Player's Ltee de Trois-Rivières	
1993	Aug 15	(United States) Scott Sharp	Chevrolet Camaro	50 Laps - 121.2 km (75.3 mi)	Le Grand Prix Player's Ltee de Trois-Rivières	
1994	Aug 7	(United States) Tommy Kendall	Ford Mustang	55 Laps - 133.30 km (82.83 mi)	Le Grand Prix Player's Ltee de Trois-Rivières	
1995	Aug 6	(Canada) Ron Fellows	Chevrolet Camaro	55 Laps - 133.30 km (82.83 mi)	Le Grand Prix Player's Ltee de Trois-Rivières	
1996	Aug 4	(Canada) Ron Fellows	Chevrolet Camaro	55 Laps - 133.30 km (82.83 mi)	Le Grand Prix Player's Ltee de Trois-Rivières	
1997	Aug 3	(United States) Tommy Kendall	Ford Mustang	55 Laps - 133.30 km (82.83 mi)	Le Grand Prix Player's de Trois-Rivières	
1998	Aug 2	(United States) Paul Gentilozzi	Chevrolet Corvette	55 Laps - 133.30 km (82.83 mi)	Le Grand Prix Player's de Trois-Rivières	
1999	Aug 1	(United States) Paul Gentilozzi	Ford Mustang	55 Laps - 133.30 km (82.83 mi)	Le Grand Prix Player's de Trois-Rivières	
2002	Aug 4	(United States) Butch Leitzinger	Chevrolet Corvette	66 Laps	Le Grand Prix de Trois-Rivières	
2003	Aug 2	(United States) Scott Pruett	Jaguar XKR	65 Laps - 159.0 km (98.8 mi)	Le Grand Prix de Trois-Rivières	
2004	Aug 1	(United States) Paul Gentilozzi	Jaguar XKR	65 Laps - 159.0 km (98.8 mi)	Le Grand Prix de Trois-Rivières	
2011	Aug 7	(United States) Tony Ave	Chevrolet Corvette	61 Laps - 149.317 km (92.781 mi)	Le Grand Prix de Trois-Rivières	

=== SCCA Spec Racer Ford Pro Series ===
Year	Date	Drivers	Car	Distance/Duration	Race title	Report
2011	Aug 5 - race 1	(United States) Brian Schofield	Spec Racer Ford	21 Laps - 51.404 km (31.941 mi)	Le Grand Prix de Trois Rivières	
2011	Aug 7 - race 2	(United States) Richard Spicer	Spec Racer Ford	17 Laps - 41.613 km (25.857 mi)	Le Grand Prix de Trois Rivières	

=== CART Firestone/Dayton Indy Lights ===
Season	Date	Winning driver
1996	August 4	(Brazil) Hélio Castroneves
1997	August 3	(Brazil) Tony Kanaan
1998	August 2	(Brazil) Cristiano da Matta

=== IndyCar Firestone Indy Lights ===
Season	Date	Winning driver
2011	August 7	(Argentina) Esteban Guerrieri
2012	August 5	(France) Tristan Vautier

=== FIA World Rallycross Championship ===
Season	Date	Winning driver
2014	August 7–8	(Norway) Petter Solberg
2015	August 7–8	(France) Davy Jeanney
2016	August 6–7	(Sweden) Timmy Hansen
2017	August 5-6	(Sweden) Johan Kristoffersson
2018	August 4-5	(Sweden) Johan Kristoffersson
2019	August 3	(Norway) Andreas Bakkerud
