= 1996 Trans-Am Series =

American sports car racing competition

Seasons
- ← 1995 1997 →

The 1996 Trans-Am Series was the 31st season of the Sports Car Club of America's Trans-Am Series.

== Results ==
Round	Circuit	Winning driver	Winning vehicle
1	St. Petersburg	(Canada) Ron Fellows	Chevrolet Camaro
2	Homestead	(United States) Tommy Kendall	Ford Mustang
3	Long Beach	(United States) Jamie Galles	Chevrolet Camaro
4	Phoenix	(United States) Dorsey Schroeder	Ford Mustang
5	Mosport Park	(United States) Paul Gentilozzi	Chevrolet Camaro
6	Lime Rock Park	(United States) Dorsey Schroeder	Ford Mustang
7	Detroit	(United States) Dorsey Schroeder	Ford Mustang
8	Cleveland	(United States) Tommy Kendall	Ford Mustang
9	Minneapolis	(United States) Tommy Kendall	Ford Mustang
10	Trois-Rivières	(Canada) Ron Fellows	Chevrolet Camaro
11	Watkins Glen	(United States) Dorsey Schroeder	Ford Mustang
12	Road America	(United States) Tommy Kendall	Ford Mustang
13	Dallas	(Canada) Ron Fellows	Chevrolet Camaro
14	Reno	(Canada) Ron Fellows	Chevrolet Camaro
