= Puerto Rico Grand Prix =

Auto race in 1962 and 2003

- Isla Grande Airport

Race information
- Number of times held: 2
- First held: 1962
- Last held: 2003
- Most wins (drivers): no multiple winners
- Most wins (constructors): no multiple winners
- Circuit length: 2.575 km (1.6 miles)
- Race length: 141.625 km (88 miles)
- Laps: 55

Last race (2003)

Pole position
- (United States) Scott Pruett; Jaguar XKR

Podium
- 1. (Puerto Rico) Wally Castro; Jaguar XKR; 2. (United States) Bobby Sak; Chevrolet Corvette; 3. (United States) Tomy Drissi; Jaguar XKR

Fastest lap

The Puerto Rico Grand Prix was a motor race held in Puerto Rico in 1962 and 2003.

== History ==
In the 1950s and 1960s a series of sports car races took place after the European season in the Caribbean and the US centred on the big dollar speedweek of races in Nassau in the Bahamas. The Grand Prix Societe de Puerto Rico held an expansion to the Nassau season on the Antilles Auto Racing Circuit, near Caguas over two weekends in November 1962. The main event was held on November 11. The race was dominated by Roger Penske in his Zerex special. Penske won the 246 kilometre race by three laps ahead of Timmy Mayer in a Cooper Climax and factory Porsche racer Dan Gurney in a Porsche 718 WRS.

The long-running American Trans-Am Series staged a Puerto Rico Grand Prix in 2003 in what was a one-time visit to the island territory. Jorge Diaz promoted the event, which was held on a temporary circuit on runway, taxiways and support roads of San Juan's Isla Grande Airport. Jorge Diaz, Jr. climbed from a rear of grid penalty into the top three, but the win went to Jaguar driver Wally Castro ahead of Bobby Sak and Tomy Drissi. A planned 2004 race was cancelled.

== Winners ==
Year	Driver	Constructor	Race Name	Circuit	Report
1962	(United States) Roger Penske	Zerex Special-Climax	Grand Prix Société de Puerto Rico	Antilles Auto Racing Circuit	Report
1963 – 2002	Not held				
2003	(Puerto Rico) Wally Castro	Jaguar XKR Trans Am	Gran Premio de Puerto Rico	Isla Grande Airport Circuit	Report

== See also ==
- Grand Prix de Ponce
- Cuban Grand Prix
- Bahamas Speed Week
