= 1997 Trans-Am Series =

Sports car racing series

Seasons
- ← 1996 1998 →

The 1997 Trans-Am Series was the 32nd season of the Sports Car Club of America's Trans-Am Series. Tommy Kendall nearly swept the series, winning all but the final two rounds. Ford swept the series, with both Kendall and Mike Borkowski driving Mustangs.

== Results ==
Round	Circuit	Winning driver	Winning vehicle	Report
1	St. Petersburg	(United States) Tommy Kendall	Ford Mustang	Report
2	Phoenix	(United States) Tommy Kendall	Ford Mustang	Report
3	Lime Rock Park	(United States) Tommy Kendall	Ford Mustang	Report
4	Detroit	(United States) Tommy Kendall	Ford Mustang	Report
5	Mid-Ohio	(United States) Tommy Kendall	Ford Mustang	Report
6	Minneapolis	(United States) Tommy Kendall	Ford Mustang	Report
7	Cleveland	(United States) Tommy Kendall	Ford Mustang	Report
8	Trois-Rivières	(United States) Tommy Kendall	Ford Mustang	Report
9	Watkins Glen	(United States) Tommy Kendall	Ford Mustang	Report
10	Road America	(United States) Tommy Kendall	Ford Mustang	Report
11	Mosport Park	(United States) Tommy Kendall	Ford Mustang	Report
12	Pikes Peak	(United States) Mike Borkowski	Ford Mustang	Report
13	Reno	(United States) Mike Borkowski	Ford Mustang	Report
