= 2003 Trans-Am Series =

American sports car racing competition

Seasons
- ← 2002 2004 →

The 2003 Trans-Am Series for the BFGoodrich Tires Cup was the 38th season of the Sports Car Club of America's Trans-Am Series. This year saw the series visit Puerto Rico for the first time; the first race since 1991 not in Canada or the United States. The Rookie of the Year was won by Jorge Diaz, Jr., the Owners Championship was won by the #7 Rocketsports Racing entry and the Manufacturers' Championship was won by Jaguar.

== Schedule ==
The 2003 schedule was released in February 2003 with 11 rounds, featuring the new for 2003 Puerto Rico Grand Prix, and an unconfirmed 12th round to be announced at a later date. In March, the 2003 National Grand Prix of Washington D.C, scheduled for June 28–29, was cancelled due to local environmental and noise concerns. In August, it was announced that the series would be added to the Grand Prix Americas CART weekend.

Rd.	Date	Race name	Track
1	February 23	Grand Prix of St. Petersburg	(United States) St. Petersburg Street Circuit
2	April 13	Grand Prix of Long Beach	(United States) Long Beach Street Circuit
3	May 18	The Victoria Day Trans-Am Weekend	(Canada) Mosport International Raceway
4	May 26	Lime Rock Grand Prix	(United States) Lime Rock Park
5	June 22	Trans Am 100	(United States) Infineon Raceway
6	July 4	Cleveland Grand Prix	(United States) Cleveland Burke Lakefront Airport
7	August 2	Grand Prix de Trois-Rivières	(Canada) Circuit Trois-Rivières
8	August 24	The Trans-Am 100	(United States) Road America
9	August 31	MotoRock Mile High 100	(United States) Denver Street Circuit
10	September 28	MotoRock Miami 100	(United States) Miami Bayfront Park Street Circuit
11	October 24	Puerto Rico Grand Prix	(Puerto Rico) Isla Grande Airport Circuit

== Results ==
Rd.	Race	Pole position	Winning Driver	Winning Car
1	(United States) St. Petersburg	(United States) Scott Pruett	(United States) Scott Pruett	Jaguar XKR
2	(United States) Long Beach	(United States) Scott Pruett	(United States) Boris Said	Ford Mustang
3	(Canada) Mosport	(United States) Scott Pruett	(United States) Scott Pruett	Jaguar XKR
4	(United States) Lime Rock	(United States) Johnny Miller	(United States) Johnny Miller	Jaguar XKR
5	(United States) Infineon	(United States) Scott Pruett	(United States) Scott Pruett	Jaguar XKR
6	(United States) Cleveland	(United States) Scott Pruett	(United States) Scott Pruett	Jaguar XKR
7	(Canada) Trois-Rivières	(United States) Scott Pruett	(United States) Scott Pruett	Jaguar XKR
8	(United States) Road America	(United States) Johnny Miller	(United States) Scott Pruett	Jaguar XKR
9	(United States) Denver	(United States) Scott Pruett	(United States) Scott Pruett	Jaguar XKR
10	(United States) Miami	(United States) Scott Pruett	(United States) Scott Pruett	Jaguar XKR
11	(Puerto Rico) San Juan	(United States) Scott Pruett	(Puerto Rico) Wally Castro	Jaguar XKR

== Final points standings ==
Place	Driver	Points
1	(United States) Scott Pruett	340
2	(United States) Johnny Miller	264
3	(United States) Michael Lewis	228
4	(Puerto Rico) Jorge Diaz, Jr.	219
5	(United States) Bobby Sak	209
6	(United States) Randy Ruhlman	186
7	(United States) Stu Hayner	178
8	(United States) John Baucom	173
9	(United States) Tomy Drissi	148
10	(United States) Simon Gregg	122
11	(United States) Boris Said	119
12	(Australia) Joey Scarallo	108
13	(United States) Paul Gentilozzi	85
14	(United States) Max Lagod	78
15	(United States) Bob Ruman	69
16	(United States) Greg Pickett	61
results incomplete
