= 1997 Mosport Festival =

Mosport International Raceway

The 1997 Mosport Festival was a professional sports car racing event held at Mosport International Raceway in Bowmanville, Ontario, Canada on August 29 to the 31st, 1997. It was the seventh round of the 1997 Professional SportsCar Racing Championship season. The weekend featured a separate 1 hour 45 minute, 52 lap Exxon Supreme GT Series race for GT cars on the Saturday and a 2-hour, 86 lap Exxon World SportsCar Championship race for World Sports Cars on the Sunday. The split races were the only time since the 1995 revival of the Mosport IMSA round that the race has gone two instead of three hours.

The World Sports Car race was won by the Central Arkansas Racing team with drivers Ron Fellows and Rob Morgan driving a Ferrari 333 SP. The Sunday race attracted more than 30,000 spectators with an estimated total of 100,000 over the four-day festival.

The weekend included the eleventh race of the 1997 Trans-Am season won by Tommy Kendall in a Ford Mustang for his eleventh straight win of the season. The festival also included concerts at the track by Tom Cochrane and the Goo Goo Dolls.

== Race results ==
=== Exxon World SportsCar Championship ===
Pos	Class	No	Team	Drivers	Chassis	Tyre	Laps
Pos	Class	No	Team	Drivers	Engine	Tyre	Laps
1	WSC	43	Central Arkansas Racing	(Canada) Ron Fellows (United States) Rob Morgan	Ferrari 333SP	G	86
1	WSC	43	Central Arkansas Racing	(Canada) Ron Fellows (United States) Rob Morgan	Ferrari F310E 4.0L V12	G	86
2	WSC	16	(United States) Dyson Racing	(United States) Butch Leitzinger (United Kingdom) James Weaver	Riley & Scott Mk III	G	86
2	WSC	16	(United States) Dyson Racing	(United States) Butch Leitzinger (United Kingdom) James Weaver	Ford 5.0L V8	G	86
3	WSC	1	(United States) Doyle/Riley & Scott	(South Africa) Wayne Taylor (Belgium) Eric van de Poele	Riley & Scott Mk III	P	86
3	WSC	1	(United States) Doyle/Riley & Scott	(South Africa) Wayne Taylor (Belgium) Eric van de Poele	Oldsmobile Aurora 4.0 L V8	P	86
4	WSC	27	(United States) Moretti Racing	(Italy) Gianpiero Moretti (I) (Belgium) Didier Theys (B)	Ferrari 333 SP	Y	86
4	WSC	27	(United States) Moretti Racing	(Italy) Gianpiero Moretti (I) (Belgium) Didier Theys (B)	Ferrari F310E 4.0 L V12	Y	86
5	WSC	3	(Peru) Dibos Racing	(Peru) Eduardo Dibos (Spain) Fermin Velez	Ferrari 333 SP	G	84
5	WSC	3	(Peru) Dibos Racing	(Peru) Eduardo Dibos (Spain) Fermin Velez	Ferrari F310E 4.0 L V12	G	84
6	WSC	88	(United States) MSI Racing	(Canada) Ross Bentley (United States) Jeff Jones	Riley & Scott Mk III	G	81
6	WSC	88	(United States) MSI Racing	(Canada) Ross Bentley (United States) Jeff Jones	Chevrolet 6.0 L V8	G	81
7	WSC	28	(United States) FAB Factory Motorsport	(United States) Jon Field (United States) A. J. Smith	Spice SC95	G	80
7	WSC	28	(United States) FAB Factory Motorsport	(United States) Jon Field (United States) A. J. Smith	Oldsmobile Aurora 4.0 L V8	G	80
8	WSC	63	(United States) Downing Atlanta Racing	(United States) Barry Waddell (United States) Jim Downing	Kudzu DLM	G	75
8	WSC	63	(United States) Downing Atlanta Racing	(United States) Barry Waddell (United States) Jim Downing	Mazda 2.0 L 3-Rotor	G	75
9	WSC	30	(United States) Moretti Racing	(Brazil) Antônio Hermann (BR) (Italy) Andrea Montermini (I)	Ferrari 333 SP	Y	71
9	WSC	30	(United States) Moretti Racing	(Brazil) Antônio Hermann (BR) (Italy) Andrea Montermini (I)	Ferrari F310E 4.0 L V12	Y	71
10	WSC	17	(France) Courage Compétition	(Canada) Martin Guimont (Canada) Jacek Mucha	Courage C41	G	62
10	WSC	17	(France) Courage Compétition	(Canada) Martin Guimont (Canada) Jacek Mucha	Oldsmobile Aurora 4.0 L V8	G	62
11	WSC	4	(Peru) Dibos Racing	(Peru) Neto Jochamowitz (United States) Jim Pace	Riley & Scott Mk III	P	48
11	WSC	4	(Peru) Dibos Racing	(Peru) Neto Jochamowitz (United States) Jim Pace	Oldsmobile Aurora 4.0 L V8	P	48
12	WSC	20	(United States) Dyson Racing	(United States) Elliott Forbes-Robinson (United Kingdom) Andy Wallace	Riley & Scott Mk III	G	40
12	WSC	20	(United States) Dyson Racing	(United States) Elliott Forbes-Robinson (United Kingdom) Andy Wallace	Ford 5.0 L V8	G	40
13	WSC	19	(United States) Davin Racing	(United States) Edd Davin (United States) Mark Montgomery	Argo P	G	1
13	WSC	19	(United States) Davin Racing	(United States) Edd Davin (United States) Mark Montgomery	BMW 4.0 L V8	G	1

- Time of race: 2 hours, 3.205 seconds
- Average speed: 170.092 km-per-hour
- Margin of victory: 0.89 seconds
- Fastest race lap: Andrea Montermini, 1:12.527 (196.430 km/h), lap 61

=== Exxon Supreme GT Series ===
Pos	Class	No	Team	Drivers	Car	Tyre	Laps
1	GTS-1	01	Rohr Corp.	(United States) Jochen Rohr (United States) Andy Pilgrim (United States) Dorsey Schroeder	Porsche 911 GT1	P	52
2	GTS-1	66	Panoz Motorsports	(United States) Doc Bundy (United Kingdom) Andy Wallace	Panoz GTR-1 Ford		52
3	GTS-2	61	Konrad Motorsport	(Austria) Franz Konrad (United States) Nick Ham	Porsche 911 GT2 Turbo	P	50
4	GTS-3	6	Prototype Technology Group	(United States) Derek Hill (Costa Rica) Javier Quiros	BMW M3	Y	50
5	GTS-3	7	Prototype Technology Group	(Austria) Dieter Quester (Belgium) Marc Duez	BMW M3	Y	49
6	GTS-1	02	Rohr Corp.	(Canada) Victor Sifton (United States) Joe Varde (United States) Jochen Rohr (United States) Andy Pilgrim	Porsche 911 GT2 Turbo	P	49
7	GTS-2	97	GMB Motorsports (USA)	(United States) Dirk Layer (United States) Kelly Collins	Porsche 911 GT2 Turbo	P	49
8	GTS-3	39	Jim Mathews Racing / Carolina Turkey	(United States) Jim Matthews (United States) David Murry	Porsche 993	P	49
9	GTS-2	15		(United States) Will Pace (United States) Jim Pace (United States) Snow - DNP	Porsche 911 Turbo	Y	48
10	GTS-3	76	Team A.R.E. (USA)	(United States) Jeff Purner (United States) Blackman	Porsche 993 Carrera RSR		48
11	GTS-3	73	Jack Lewis Enterprises	(United States) Jack Lewis (Canada) Tony Burgess	Porsche 993 Carrera RSR	G	47
12	GTS-1	91	Rock Valley Oil & Chemical Co. Inc.	(United States) Roger Schramm (United States) Stu Hayner	Chevrolet Camaro	P	40
13	GTS-3	41	Team Technodyne	(United States) Chris Cervelli (United States) Cort Wagner	Porsche 993 Carrera RSR	P	37 mechanical
14	GTS-3	10	Prototype Technology Group	(United States) Bill Auberlen (United States) Boris Said	BMW M3	Y	30
15	GTS-2	99	Schumacher Racing	(United States) Larry Schumacher (United States) John O'Steen	Porsche 911 GT2 Turbo	P	28
16	GTS-1	27	Multimatic Motorsports	(Canada) Scott Maxwell (Canada) Jason Priestley	Ford Mustang Cobra	G	7 mechanical
17	GTS-2	56	Martin Snow	(United States) Martin Snow (United States) Peter Kitchak	Porsche 911 GT2 Turbo		0 accident
18	GTS-3	77	Mattco Racing	(United States) Matthew Cohen (United States) Pete Halsmer (United States) Renna	BMW M3	Y	0 accident
19	GTS-3	32	Phoenix American Motorsport	(United States) Marty Miller (United States) John Heinricy (United States) Joe Aquilante	Pontiac Firebird		0 accident
DNS	GTS-3	18	RAE Motorsports Inc.	(United States) Raymond Boissoneau (United States) Peter Goebel	Mazda RX-7		DNS
DNS	GTS-2	53		(United States) Melanie Snow	Porsche 911 GT2 Turbo		DNS
DNS		36	Schumacher Racing	(United States) Larry Schumacher (United States) John O'Steen	Porsche 911		DNS

- Time of race: 1 hour, 46 minutes 1.543 seconds
- Average speed: 116.452 km-per-hour
- Margin of victory: 15.256 seconds
- Fastest race lap: #66 Panoz GTR-1 Ford, 1:18.634 (181.1638 km/h), lap 23

=== Trans-Am Series ===
Pos	No	Driver	Car	Laps
1	5	(United States) Tommy Kendall	Ford Mustang Cobra	40
2	3	(United States) Dorsey Schroeder	Ford Mustang Cobra	40
3	6	(United States) Jon Gooding	Ford Mustang Cobra	40
4	2	(United States) Brian Simo	Ford Mustang Cobra	39
5	7	(United States) Mike Borkowski	Ford Mustang Cobra	39
6	9	(United States) John W. Miller IV	Chevrolet Camaro	39
7	13	(United States) Bruce Nesbitt	Ford Mustang Cobra	39
8	10	(United States) Leighton Reese	Pontiac Grand Prix	38
9	8	(United States) Max Lagod	Chevrolet Camaro	38
10	12	(United States) Don Sak	Oldsmobile Cutlass	38
11	11	(United States) Don Meluzio	Chevrolet Camaro	37
12	14	(United States) Craig Shafer	Chevrolet Camaro	37
13	17	(United States) John Halbing	Oldsmobile Cutlass	36
14	19	(United States) Ed Hinchliff	Ford Mustang Cobra	35
15	21	(United States) Chet Williams	Chevrolet Camaro	35
16	18	(United States) Frank Cioppettini Jr.	Chevrolet Camaro	34
17	15	(United States) Bob Ruman	Chevrolet Camaro	32
18	4	(United States) Paul Gentilozzi	Chevrolet Camaro	26 - Mech.
19	1	(Italy) Alessandro Zampedri	Chevrolet Camaro	23 - Crash.
20	22	(Canada) Jerry Simmons	Chevrolet Camaro	15 - Mech.
21	20	(United States) Jim Briody	Chevrolet Camaro	9 - Mech.
22	16	(United States) Ray Genick	Chevrolet Camaro	2 - Elect.

- Time of race: 1 hour, 5 minutes, 46 seconds
- Average speed: 89.735 miles-per-hour
- Margin of victory: 1.3730 seconds
- Fastest race lap: Tommy Kendall, 1:22.117 (107.802 mph), lap 30
