= 1998 Trans-Am Series =

American sports car racing competition

Seasons
- ← 1997 1999 →

The 1998 Trans-Am Series was the 33rd season of the Sports Car Club of America's Trans-Am Series.

== Results ==
Round	Circuit	Winning driver	Winning vehicle
1	Long Beach	(United States) Paul Gentilozzi	Chevrolet Corvette
2	Homestead	(United States) Paul Gentiliozzi	Chevrolet Corvette
3	Lime Rock Park	(United States) Lou Gigliotti	Ford Mustang
4	Detroit	(United States) Paul Gentilozzi	Chevrolet Corvette
5	Mid-Ohio	(United States) Paul Gentilozzi	Chevrolet Corvette
6	Minneapolis	(United States) Paul Gentilozzi	Chevrolet Corvette
7	Cleveland	(United States) Bill Saunders	Chevrolet Corvette
8	Grand Rapids	(United States) Bill Saunders	Chevrolet Corvette
9	Trois-Rivières	(United States) Paul Gentilozzi	Chevrolet Corvette
10	Watkins Glen	(United States) Paul Gentilozzi	Chevrolet Corvette
11	Road America	(United States) Stu Hayner	Chevrolet Camaro
12	Pikes Peak	(United States) Brian Simo	Ford Mustang
13	Houston	(United States) Brian Simo	Ford Mustang
