= 1973 Trans-Am Series =

American sports car racing competition

Seasons
- ← 1972 1974 →

The 1973 Trans-Am Series was the eighth running of the Sports Car Club of America's premier series. It began on April 15 and ran for six rounds. Due to the decline of demand for muscle cars in the early seventies and the energy crisis that year, 1973 is considered to be the beginning of the decline of Trans Am. In contrast to American muscle dominating previous years, Porsche won the manufacturers' championship this year. 1973 also saw the rise of silhouette cars as a way of adapting to the decline of performance cars, ultimately making the cars interchangeable with IMSA GTO and GTU.

== Results ==
Round	Date	Circuit	Duration	Winning driver	Winning vehicle
1	April 15	Road Atlanta	315 miles	(United States) Peter Gregg	Porsche Carrera
2	May 5	Lime Rock	310 miles	(United States) Milt Minter	Porsche Carrera
3	June 16	Watkins Glen	243 miles	(Canada) Maurice Carter	Chevrolet Camaro
4	July 15	Sanair	182 miles	(United States) Warren Agor	Chevrolet Camaro
5	July 28	Road America	312 miles	(United States) John Greenwood	Chevrolet Corvette
6	August 19	Edmonton	316 miles	(United States) John Greenwood	Chevrolet Corvette

== Championships ==
=== Driver ===
1. Peter Gregg – 56 points
2. Al Holbert – 49 points
3. J. Marshall Robbins – 42 points
4. Warren Agor – 39 points
5. Jerry Thompson – 34 points

=== Manufacturer ===
1. Porsche – 31 points
2. Camaro – 28 points
3. Chevrolet Corvette – 23 points
4. Ford Escort – 3 points
