= 1975 Trans-Am Series =

American sports car racing competition

Seasons
- ← 1974 1976 →

The 1975 Trans-Am Series was the tenth running of the Sports Car Club of America's premier series. All races except for the Six Hours of Watkins Glen ran for approximately one hundred miles.

The Drivers Championship was won by John Greenwood and the Manufacturers title was awarded to Chevrolet.

== Results ==
Round	Date	Circuit	Winning driver(s)	Winning vehicle
1	June 1	Pocono	(United States) John Greenwood	Chevrolet Corvette
2	June 1	Seattle	(United States) Walt Maas	Datsun 280Z
3	June 15	Portland	(United States) John Greenwood	Chevrolet Corvette
4	June 29	Nelson Ledges	(United States) John Greenwood	Chevrolet Corvette
5	July 12	Watkins Glen	(United States) Babe Headley (United States) Paul Missuriello	Chevrolet Corvette
6	July 26	Road America	(United States) Jerry Hansen	Chevrolet Corvette
7	September 7	Brainerd	(United States) Jerry Hansen	Chevrolet Corvette

Note: The Six Hours of Watkins Glen was also a round of the 1975 World Championship for Makes, and was won outright by Henri Pescarolo and Derek Bell driving an Alfa Romeo 33TT12. Headley & Missuriello were the best placed of the Trans Am competitors.
