= Grand Prix of Minnesota =

The Grand Prix of Minnesota was an auto racing event held from 1996 until 1998 on an Alan Wilson-designed temporary street circuit in Minneapolis, Minnesota near the Hubert H. Humphrey Metrodome. It was known as the Children's Grand Prix of Minneapolis in 1996, changing its name to The Sprint PCS Grand Prix of Minneapolis for its final two years.

The Grand Prix of Minneapolis was started as the first professional auto race in the United States that would contribute all of its profit to charity. The goal of the Grand Prix was to make a $1 million annual contribution to the Cancer KIDS Fund, part of the Children's Healthcare Foundation of the Twin Cities. The event was founded by Mark and Claudia Cohn after their son Tyler (1988 – 1997) was diagnosed with leukemia at the age of 4. Rather than giving a one-time donation, the Cohn's decided to create an event that would provide long-term support for the Cancer KIDS Fund.

The event debuted on July 6 and 7 1996 with Boston Market as the sponsor. They returned for their second year on July 4 through 6 1997 with Sprint PCS as its sponsor, and they held an event on June 27 and 28 1998 with Sprint PCS continuing to be their sponsor.

All three years had the Sports Car Club of America (SCCA) Trans-Am Championship as the featured race. The supporting races in 1996 included the World Challenge Grand Sports Division, Sports 2 and Touring Division, Touring 1 and 2, Spec Racer Ford Pro Series, and a Vintage Car race. The supporting races in 1997 were the Barber Dodge Pro Series, World Challenge Touring Division 1 and 2, Spec Racer Ford Pro Series, and a Vintage Car race. For their last year, the supporting races were the United States Road Racing Championship, F2000 Series, World Challenge Touring Division 1 and 2, and the Dodge Neon Charity Challenge.

== Race winners ==
Trans-Am

Season	Date	Winning driver	Chassis
1996	July 7	(United States) Tommy Kendall	Ford Mustang Cobra
1997	July 6	(United States) Tommy Kendall	Ford Mustang Cobra
1998	June 28	(United States) Paul Gentilozzi	Chevrolet Corvette

USRRC

Season	Date	Winning drivers	Chassis/engine
1998	June 28	(United Kingdom) James Weaver - (United States) Butch Leitzinger	Riley & Scott Mk. III-Ford

SCCA World Challenge S2 Class

Season	Date	Winning driver	Chassis
1996	July 7	(United States) Shane Lewis	Mosler Intruder

SCCA World Challenge T1 Class

Season	Date	Winning driver	Chassis
1996	July 7	(United States) Greg Theiss	Eagle Talon
1998	June 28	(United States) Chris Wiehle	Chevrolet Corvette

SCCA World Challenge T2 Class

Season	Date	Winning driver	Chassis
1996	July 7	(United States) Chuck Hemmingson	Oldsmobile Achieva
1998	June 28	(United States) Lance Stewart	Acura Integra Type-R

SCCA Spec Racer Ford

Season	Date	Winning driver
1996	July 7	(United States) James Goughary

Barber Dodge Pro Series

Season	Date	Winning driver
1997	July 6	(Italy) Rino Mastronardi

U.S. F2000 National Championship

Season	Date	Winning driver
1998	June 28	(United States) Jonathan Bottoms

Vintage

Season	Date	Winning driver	Chassis
1996	July 7	(United States) Mark E. Langren	Porsche 911 2.8 RSR

== Sources ==
- Deborah Hopp, Publisher, Children's Grand Prix of Minnesota 1996 Official Souvenir Program, MSP Communications Custom Publishing
- Deborah Hopp, Publisher, Sprint PCS Grand Prix of Minnesota 1997 Official Souvenir Program, MSP Communications Custom Publishing
- Deborah Hopp, Publisher, Sprint PCS Grand Prix of Minnesota 1998 Official Souvenir Program, MSP Communications Custom Publishing
- http://wilsonmotorsport.com/public_html/code/maps.htm#street
- http://motorsport.com/news/article.asp?ID=5884&FS=TRANSAM
- http://motorsport.com/news/article.asp?ID=5885&FS=TRANSAM
- http://motorsport.com/news/article.asp?ID=10231&FS=TRANSAM
- http://motorsport.com/news/article.asp?ID=10233&FS=TRANSAM
- http://motorsport.com/news/article.asp?ID=17002&FS=TRANSAM
