= 1995 Trans-Am Series =

American sports car racing competition

Seasons
- ← 1994 1996 →

The 1995 Trans-Am Series was the thirtieth season of the Sports Car Club of America's Trans-Am Series.

== Results ==
Round	Circuit	Winning driver	Winning vehicle
1	Phoenix	(United States) Price Cobb	Chevrolet Camaro
2	Mosport Park	(United States) Dorsey Schroeder	Ford Mustang
3	Lime Rock Park	(United States) Dorsey Schroeder	Ford Mustang
4	Detroit	(Canada) Ron Fellows	Chevrolet Camaro
5	Portland	(Canada) Ron Fellows	Chevrolet Camaro
6	Road America	(United States) Boris Said	Ford Mustang
7	Cleveland	(Canada) Ron Fellows	Chevrolet Camaro
8	Trois-Rivières	(Canada) Ron Fellows	Chevrolet Camaro
9	Watkins Glen	(Canada) Ron Fellows	Chevrolet Camaro
10	Road Atlanta	(United States) Tommy Kendall	Ford Mustang
11	Sears Point	(United States) Dorsey Schroeder	Ford Mustang

== Championships ==
=== Drivers ===
1. Tommy Kendall – 305 points
2. Ron Fellows – 281 points
3. Dorsey Schroeder – 269 points
4. Brian Simo – 213 points
5. Jamie Galles – 207 points

=== Manufacturers ===
1. Chevrolet – 82 points
2. Ford – 80 points
