= 1974 Trans-Am Series =

American sports car racing competition

Seasons
- ← 1973 1975 →

The 1974 Trans-Am Series was the ninth running of the Sports Car Club of America's premier series. It began on May 4 and ran for only three rounds, including the Six Hours of Watkins Glen.

== Results ==
Round	Date	Circuit	Duration	Winning driver	Winning vehicle
1	May 4	Lime Rock	200 miles	(United States) Al Holbert	Porsche Carrera
2	July 13	Watkins Glen	Six hours	(France) Jean-Pierre Beltoise (France) Jean-Pierre Jarier	Matra-Simca
3	July 27	Road America	200 miles	(United States) Peter Gregg	Porsche Carrera

== Championships ==
=== Driver ===
==== Over Two Liter ====
1. Peter Gregg – 60 points
2. Ludwig Heimrath – 53 points
3. Hurley Haywood – 50 points
4. Al Holbert – 32 points
5. Jim Cook – 30 points

==== Under Two Liter ====
1. Richard Weiss – 35 points
2. Seig Glage – 22 points
3. John Stevens – 20 points
4. Harold Keck – 20 points
5. Tim Meehan – 15 points

=== Manufacturer ===
1. Porsche – 36 points
2. Camaro – 14 points
3. BMW – 3 points
4. AMC Javelin – 1 point
