= 1999 Trans-Am Series =

American sports car racing competition

Seasons
- ← 1998 2000 →

The 1999 Trans-Am Series was the 34th season of the Sports Car Club of America's Trans-Am Series. 1999 was the end of the "American muscle revival" era of Trans-Am, as Italian manufacturer Qvale would win the championship the following year. Ford would sweep the season. Paul Gentilozzi won the drivers' championship.

== Results ==
Rnd	Date	Circuit	Winning driver	Winning vehicle
1	April 18	Long Beach Street Circuit	(United States) Paul Gentilozzi	Ford Mustang
2	May 23	Mosport International Raceway	(United States) Brian Simo	Ford Mustang
3	May 31	Lime Rock Park	(United States) Brian Simo	Ford Mustang
4	June 6	Mid-Ohio Sports Car Course	(United States) Paul Gentilozzi	Ford Mustang
5	July 10	Road America	(United States) Paul Gentilozzi	Ford Mustang
6	July 25	Road Atlanta	(United States) Chris Neville	Ford Mustang
7	August 1	Circuit Trois-Rivières	(United States) Paul Gentilozzi	Ford Mustang
8	August 7	Raceway at Belle Isle Park	(United States) Brian Simo	Ford Mustang
9	August 29	Grand Rapids Street Circuit	(United States) Brian Simo	Ford Mustang
10	September 4	Vancouver Street Circuit	(United States) Brian Simo	Ford Mustang
11	September 25	Houston Street Circuit	(United States) Paul Gentilozzi	Ford Mustang
12	October 3	Pikes Peak International Raceway	(United States) Brian Simo	Ford Mustang
13	October 17	Sebring International Raceway	(United States) Paul Gentilozzi	Ford Mustang
