= 2002 Trans-Am Series =

American sports car racing competition

Seasons
- ← 2001 2003 →

The 2002 Trans-Am Series was the 37th season of the Sports Car Club of America's Trans-Am Series.

== Results ==
Round	Circuit	Winning driver	Winning vehicle
1	Long Beach	(United States) Paul Gentilozzi	Jaguar XKR
2	Mosport Park	(United States) Boris Said	Panoz Esperante
3	Lime Rock Park	(United States) Boris Said	Panoz Esperante
4	Mid-Ohio	(United States) Butch Leitzinger	Chevrolet Corvette
5	Cleveland	(United States) Boris Said	Panoz Esperante
6	Washington, D.C.	(United States) Butch Leitzinger	Chevrolet Corvette
7	Trois-Rivières	(United States) Butch Leitzinger	Chevrolet Corvette
8	Road America	(United States) Boris Said	Panoz Esperante
9	Denver	(United States) Boris Said	Panoz Esperante
10	Miami	(United States) Boris Said	Panoz Esperante
11	Road Atlanta	(United States) Boris Said	Panoz Esperante
12	Virginia	(United States) Boris Said	Ford Mustang
