= 1979 Trans-Am Series =

American sports car racing competition

Seasons
- ← 1978 1980 →

The 1979 Trans-Am Series was the fourteenth running of the Sports Car Club of America's premier series. All races except for the Six Hours of Watkins Glen ran for approximately one hundred miles. For the first time in series history, the schedule included a round held outside the United States and Canada, with the first round being contested in Mexico.

== Results ==
Round	Date	Circuit	Winning driver (TA2)	Winning vehicle (TA2)	Winning driver (TA1)	Winning vehicle (TA1)
1	May 6	Mexico City	(United States) John Paul	Porsche 935	(Mexico) Miguel Muñiz	Chevrolet Camaro
2	June 3	(Canada) Westwood	(United States) John Paul	Porsche 935	(United States) Gary Carter	Chevrolet Corvette
3	July 7	(United States) Watkins Glen ‡	(United States) Roy Woods (United States) Bob Akin	Porsche 935	(United States) Bob Tullius (United States) Brian Fuerstenau	Triumph TR8
4	July 21	(United States) Road America	(United States) Peter Gregg	Porsche 935	(United States) Gene Bothello	Chevrolet Corvette
5	August 5	(United States) Watkins Glen	(United States) John Paul	Porsche 935	(United States) Bob Tullius	Triumph TR8
6	August 19	(Canada) Mosport	(United States) John Paul	Porsche 935	(United States) Gene Bothello	Chevrolet Corvette
7	September 1	(Canada) Trois-Rivières	(United States) John Paul	Porsche 935	(United States) Gene Bothello	Chevrolet Corvette
8	October 14	(United States) Laguna Seca	(United States) Peter Gregg	Porsche 935	(United States) Bob Tullius	Triumph TR8

‡ - The Watkins Glen Six Hours was a round of the World Championship for Makes. Overall winner was an FIA Group 5 Porsche 935.
