= 1976 Trans-Am Series =

American sports car racing competition

Seasons
- ← 1975 1977 →

The 1976 Trans-Am Series was the eleventh running of the Sports Car Club of America's premier series. All races except for the Six Hours of Watkins Glen ran for approximately one hundred miles. American Motors garnered its final Trans Am victories in 1976.

== Results ==
Round	Date	Circuit	Winning driver (TA2)	Winning vehicle (TA2)	Winning driver (TA1)	Winning vehicle (TA1)
1	May 9	(United States) Pocono	(United States) Hurley Haywood	Porsche 934	(United States) Jocko Maggiacomo	AMC Javelin
2	May 30	(United States) Nelson Ledges	(United States) George Follmer	Porsche 934	(United States) Jocko Maggiacomo	AMC Javelin
3	June 13	(United States) Portland	(United States) Monte Shelton	Porsche Carrera RSR	(United States) Joe Chamberlain	Chevrolet Camaro
4	July 10	(United States) Watkins Glen ‡	(United States) Peter Gregg (United States) Hurley Haywood	BMW 3.5 CSL	(United States) John Bauer (United States) Walt Maas	Porsche 911
5	July 24	(United States) Road America	(United States) Carl Shafer	Chevrolet Camaro	(United States) Don Hager	Chevrolet Corvette
6	August 15	(United States) Brainerd	(United States) Carl Shafer	Chevrolet Camaro	(United States) Ron Weaver	Chevrolet Corvette
7	August 21	(Canada) Mosport	(Canada) Ludwig Heimrath	Porsche Carrera RSR	(United States) John Huber	Chevrolet Corvette
8	September 25	(Canada) Trois-Rivières	(United States) George Follmer	Porsche Carrera RSR	(United States) John Bauer	Porsche 911

‡ - The 6 Hours of Watkins Glen was a round of the World Championship for Makes. Overall winner was an FIA Group 5 car
