= 1983 Trans-Am Series =

American sports car racing competition

Seasons
- ← 1982 1984 →

The 1983 Budweiser Trans-Am Championship was the eighteenth running of the Sports Car Club of America's premier series.

== Results ==
| Round | Date | Circuit | Winning driver | Winning vehicle |
|---|---|---|---|---|
| 1 | 1 May | Palm Beach | Gene Felton | Pontiac Trans-Am |
| 2 | 15 May | Summit Point | David Hobbs | Chevrolet Camaro |
| 3 | 5 June | Sears Point | David Hobbs | Chevrolet Camaro |
| 4 | 12 June | Portland | Willy T. Ribbs | Chevrolet Camaro |
| 5 | 26 June | Seattle | Elliott Forbes-Robinson | Pontiac Trans-Am |
| 6 | 17 July | Mid-Ohio | Willy T. Ribbs | Chevrolet Camaro |
| 7 | 31 July | Road America | David Hobbs | Chevrolet Camaro |
| 8 | 8 August | Brainerd | Willy T. Ribbs | Chevrolet Camaro |
| 9 | 4 September | Trois-Rivières | John Paul Jr. | Chevrolet Camaro |
| 10 | 18 September | Sears Point | Willy T. Ribbs | Chevrolet Camaro |
| 11 | 25 September | Riverside | David Hobbs | Chevrolet Camaro |
| 12 | 8 October | Caesars Palace | Willy T. Ribbs | Chevrolet Camaro |

== Championships ==
=== Drivers ===
1. David Hobbs – 158 points
2. Willy T Ribbs – 148 points
3. Tom Gloy – 143 points
4. Elliott Forbes-Robinson – 102 points
5. Frank Leary – 79 points
