= 1980 Trans-Am Series =

American sports car racing competition

Seasons
- ← 1979 1981 →

The 1980 Trans-Am Series was the fifteenth running of the Sports Car Club of America's premier series. After several years of recovery from the decline of demand for muscle cars in the early seventies and the 1973 Oil Crisis, Trans Am evolved into a support series for the IMSA GT Championship, using vehicles that were also used in IMSA GT races. This would set the standard for the series thereafter, and this standard would be applied to the SCCA's World Challenge series many years later. Almost all of the races ran for approximately one hundred miles. Besides Watkins Glen, the only exception was Trois-Rivières (~75 miles).

== Schedule ==
Rd	Date	Circuit	Distance	Info
1	June 1	(United States) Hallett Motor Racing Circuit	100 miles (55 laps)	
2	June 15	(United States) Portland International Raceway	100 miles (50 laps)	
3	July 5	(United States) Watkins Glen International	6 hours (139 laps)	Also a round of the 1980 World Championship for Makes.
4	July 19	(United States) Road America	100 miles (25 laps)	
5	August 10	(United States) Brainerd International Raceway	100 miles (33 laps)	
6	August 23	(Canada) Circuit Trois-Rivières	75 miles (35 laps)	
7	September 7	(Canada) Westwood Motorsport Park	100 miles (56 laps)	
8	October 19	(United States) Laguna Seca Raceway	100 miles (52 laps)	
9	October 25	(United States) Riverside International Raceway	100 miles (40 laps)	

== Results ==
Round	Circuit	Winning driver	Winning vehicle
1	(United States) Hallett	(United States) John Bauer	Porsche 911
2	(United States) Portland	(United States) Mark Pielsticker	Chevrolet Monza
3	(United States) Watkins Glen	(United States) John Bauer (United States) Larry Green	Porsche 911
4	(United States) Road America	(United States) Monte Sheldon	Porsche 911
5	(United States) Brainerd	(United States) John Bauer	Porsche 911
6	(Canada) Trois-Rivières	(United States) Roy Woods	Chevrolet Camaro
7	(Canada) Westwood	(United States) John Bauer	Porsche 911
8	(United States) Laguna Seca	(United States) Greg Pickett	Chevrolet Corvette
9	(United States) Riverside	(United States) Greg Pickett	Chevrolet Corvette

== Championship ==
=== Drivers ===
1. John Bauer – 127 points
2. Greg Pickett – 76 points
3. Monte Sheldon – 72.5 points
4. Roy Woods – 71 points
5. Mark Pielsticker – 62 points
