= 1982 Trans-Am Series =

American sports car racing competition

Seasons
- ← 1981 1983 →

The 1982 Trans-Am Series was the seventeenth running of the Sports Car Club of America's premier series. All races ran for approximately one hundred miles. The successful Datsun brand saw its final Trans Am victory in 1982, although the Nissan brand which replaced it did see notable success thereafter.

== Results ==
Round	Date	Circuit	Winning driver	Winning vehicle
1	May 23	(United States) Road Atlanta	(United States) Jerry Hansen	Chevrolet Corvette
2	June 6	(United States) Sears Point	(United States) Doc Bundy	Porsche 924
3	June 13	(United States) Portland	(United States) Elliott Forbes-Robinson	Pontiac Trans Am
4	June 27	(United States) Laguna Seca	(United States) Elliott Forbes-Robinson	Pontiac Trans Am
5	July 4	(United States) Kent	(United States) Elliott Forbes-Robinson	Pontiac Trans Am
6	July 18	(United States) Mid-Ohio	(United States) Elliott Forbes-Robinson	Pontiac Trans Am
7	July 24	(United States) Road America	(United States) Jerry Hansen	Chevrolet Corvette
8	August 8	(United States) Brainerd	(United States) Paul Newman	Datsun 280ZX
9	September 5	(Canada) Trois-Rivières	(United States) Elliott Forbes-Robinson	Pontiac Trans Am
10	October 3	(United States) Sears Point	(United States) Tom Gloy	Ford Mustang

== Championships ==
=== Drivers ===
1. Elliot Forbes-Robinson – 147 points
2. Doc Bundy – 92 points
3. Phil Currin – 92 points
4. Tom Gloy – 72 points
5. Darrin Brassfield – 49 points
6. Rob McFarlin – 44 points

=== Manufacturers ===
1. Pontiac – 65 points
2. Chevrolet – 42 points
3. Porsche – 37 points
4. Ford – 22 points
5. Datsun – 16 points
