= 1981 Trans-Am Series =

American sports car racing competition

Seasons
- ← 1980 1982 →

The 1981 Trans-Am Series was the sixteenth running of the Sports Car Club of America's premier series. All races ran for approximately one hundred miles.

== Results ==
Round	Date	Circuit	Winning driver	Winning vehicle
1	May 17	(United States) Charlotte	(Canada) Eppie Wietzes	Chevrolet Corvette
2	July 4	(United States) Lime Rock	(United States) Greg Pickett	Chevrolet Corvette
3	July 25	(United States) Road America	(United States) Monte Sheldon	Porsche 911
4	July 26	(United States) Road America	(United States) Monte Sheldon	Porsche 911
5	August 9	(United States) Brainerd	(United States) Bob Tullius	Jaguar XJS
6	September 6	(Canada) Trois-Rivieres	(Canada) Eppie Wietzes	Chevrolet Corvette
7	September 12	(Canada) Mosport	(United States) Bob Tullius	Jaguar XJS
8	October 11	(United States) Laguna Seca	(United States) George Follmer	Chevrolet Camaro
9	October 25	(United States) Sears Point	(United States) Tom Gloy	Ford Mustang

== Championships ==
=== Drivers ===
1. Eppie Wietzes – 179 points
2. Bob Tullius – 126 points
3. Phil Currin – 91 points
4. John Bauer – 79 points
5. Roy Woods – 78 points

=== Manufacturers ===
1. Chevrolet – 64 points
2. Porsche – 36 points
3. Jaguar – 35 points
4. Ford – 13 points
