= Trans-Am Series =

North American automobile racing series

- Category: Sports car racing
- Country: United States
- Inaugural season: 1966
- Official website: www.gotransam.com

The Trans-Am Series presented by Pirelli is a sports car racing series held in North America. Founded in 1966, it is sanctioned by the Sports Car Club of America (SCCA). Primarily based in the United States, the series competes on a variety of track types including road courses and street circuits.

Trans-Am is split into the TA, TA2 and TA Cup (TAC) classes for silhouette racing cars, while its production classes are the GT (grand touring), SGT (super grand touring), and XGT (extreme grand touring).

== Origins ==
The Trans-Am Series was created in 1966 by Sports Car Club of America (SCCA) President John Bishop. Originally known as the Trans-American Sedan Championship, the name was changed to the Trans-American Championship for 1967 and henceforth. It has evolved over time from its original format as a Manufacturers' Championship series for modified passenger sedans and coupés to its current form as a Drivers' / Manufacturers' Championship Series that is open to GT style racecars. Champion drivers have been officially recognized, and Drivers' Championships awarded since the 1972 season. The series was cancelled after 2006 but was revived in 2009, using SCCA GT-1 based cars.

Over the years, the series has raced on a variety of different types of race tracks (Permanent and temporary road courses / street circuits / airport circuits) all over the country, as well as at venues in Canada, Mexico, and even San Juan, Puerto Rico in 2003. Since 2015, Trans Am has been a national series (Continental U.S. only), racing at tracks primarily throughout the East Coast, South, and Midwest. In 2017, the new stand-alone West Coast Championship was added to the Trans-Am Series. Currently, there are six races on the schedule, two of which are joint, or "shared" races with the national Championship series, in which drivers from both championship series race together in the same races, but only earn points in the championship series that they are entered in. The Trans Am series also awards the Northern Cup and Southern Cup which give points in certain races of the national series for competitors who do not run the full season.

== Current series format ==
=== Tire suppliers and presenting sponsor ===
In 2017, Pirelli became the exclusive tire supplier (replacing Hoosier Racing Tire) and presenting sponsor for the Trans Am Series, and all classes use Pirelli P ZERO radial ply racing slicks. The change from bias ply tires to Pirelli P ZERO radial tires has been very well received, and has resulted in faster average speeds and improved lap times in all four classes.

=== Schedules ===
In late 2016, the Trans Am Race Company (TARC) announced that after a long absence, the Trans Am Series would return to the West Coast with the 2017 Trans Am West Coast Championship, partnering with the Sportscar Vintage Racing Association (SVRA). The West Coast Championship Series consists of a separate 3 race competition, plus one round that is shared with the Trans Am Championship Series at Circuit of the Americas. (3 permanent road courses / 1 temporary road course)

For 2017, the schedule was reorganized, with five race venues (Homestead–Miami Speedway, Road Atlanta, Watkins Glen, Virginia International Raceway, and New Jersey Motorsports Park) receiving new dates, the Indianapolis Motor Speedway being added, and Louisiana's NOLA Motorsports Park being dropped.

For 2018, the Brainerd, MN and New Jersey Motorsports Park races were dropped, and a race at the Pittsburgh International Race Complex was added for the TA, TA3, and TA4 classes only. There are now 12 race venues on the Trans Am Championship Series schedule (8 permanent road courses / 3 temporary road courses / 1 temporary street circuit), with the Chevrolet Detroit Grand Prix presented by Lear race being open to TA2 class cars only. There are actually 13 actual races on the schedule, as the TA2 cars race twice in Detroit.

For 2018, the West Coast Championship's race at Willow Springs, CA was dropped, Sonoma, CA was added, and a shared race at INDY was added, expanding their series to a separate 3 round competition, plus two shared races (3 permanent road courses / 2 temporary road courses).

The schedule for 2019 continued to be 12 races long (including two "shared events" with the West Coast Championship Series), but the mid-April Homestead, Florida race date changed to an early May event at Weathertech Raceway, Laguna Seca, California—the first time the series raced there since 2004. The early August Pittsburgh race was also dropped, having been replaced by the Memorial Day Motorsports Festival at Connecticut's Lime Rock Park, the first time the series raced there in three years, and was the thirtieth time overall. Additionally, the Indianapolis race weekend moved from mid-June to early August, and the "shared" Circuit of the Americas (COTA) race weekend moved from early November back to early October. The Chevrolet Detroit Grand Prix presented by Lear moved from early June to May 31—June 2, just four days after the event at Lime Rock Park ended. The season finale at Daytona International Speedway moved up one week to mid-November.

On the 2019 West Coast Championship schedule, the season is one race longer (6), and opens a couple of weeks earlier at Willows, California's Thunderhill Raceway Park. The shared event at Laguna Seca took place in early May, with Sonoma moved from early June to mid-June, replacing the shared event at the Indianapolis Motor Speedway. The shared event at Circuit of the Americas (CoTA) moved from early November to early October.

For 2020, the season finale at Daytona was dropped due to unresolvable scheduling conflicts, and after a two-year absence, the race at Brainerd, Minnesota was reinstated to honor the late Jed Copham, the track's co-owner and part time Trans Am Series driver. The season's grand finale in both series was to be now be the shared event at Circuit Of The Americas (CoTA), with that race initially being moved from October to November. The Indianapolis race was the only planned event that would have been open to all competitors who were registered to race in the Trans Am Championship series, or either of the regional sub-championship series. In the West Coast Championship series, the season was to start one month earlier (mid-March) at Sonoma Raceway, which would have for the first time ever hold a second race in late August to make up for the Auto Club Speedway race being dropped. Other than this and minor reordering, the schedule remained at six races, with Laguna Seca being planned as the other shared event with both series racing together.

On March 17, 2020, the Road Atlanta round was postponed due to the outbreak of the COVID-19 pandemic. This was the start of a series of postponements and cancellations that lead to a revised schedule being announced on April 7, 2020. In this schedule, the Detroit round was dropped reducing the series to an 11-round championship. Unfortunately the planned restart of the series at Indianapolis Motor Speedway was also postponed and eventually canceled with the series resuming at Mid-Ohio Sports Car Course instead. The rounds at Watkins Glen and Lime Rock Park were the final casualties of the outbreak with late cancellations leading to double headers at Virginia International Raceway and Road Atlanta.

In 2021, for the first time since 2017, the series would return to Homestead–Miami Speedway. Trans-Am would also be having its first ever race at the newly renovated Charlotte Motor Speedway Roval and a TA2-only round at the inaugural running of the Music City Grand Prix on the streets of Nashville. No double-headers were scheduled to return following their appearances in 2020; however, all tracks that were featured on the preliminary 2020 calendar were scheduled to return for 2021. For the first time in series history, Trans-Am instituted a drop-round system where competitors would choose to drop their two worst round results including non-appearances that took place before August 1.

=== Car classifications ===
==== Tube-frame / silhouette body ====
===== TA =====
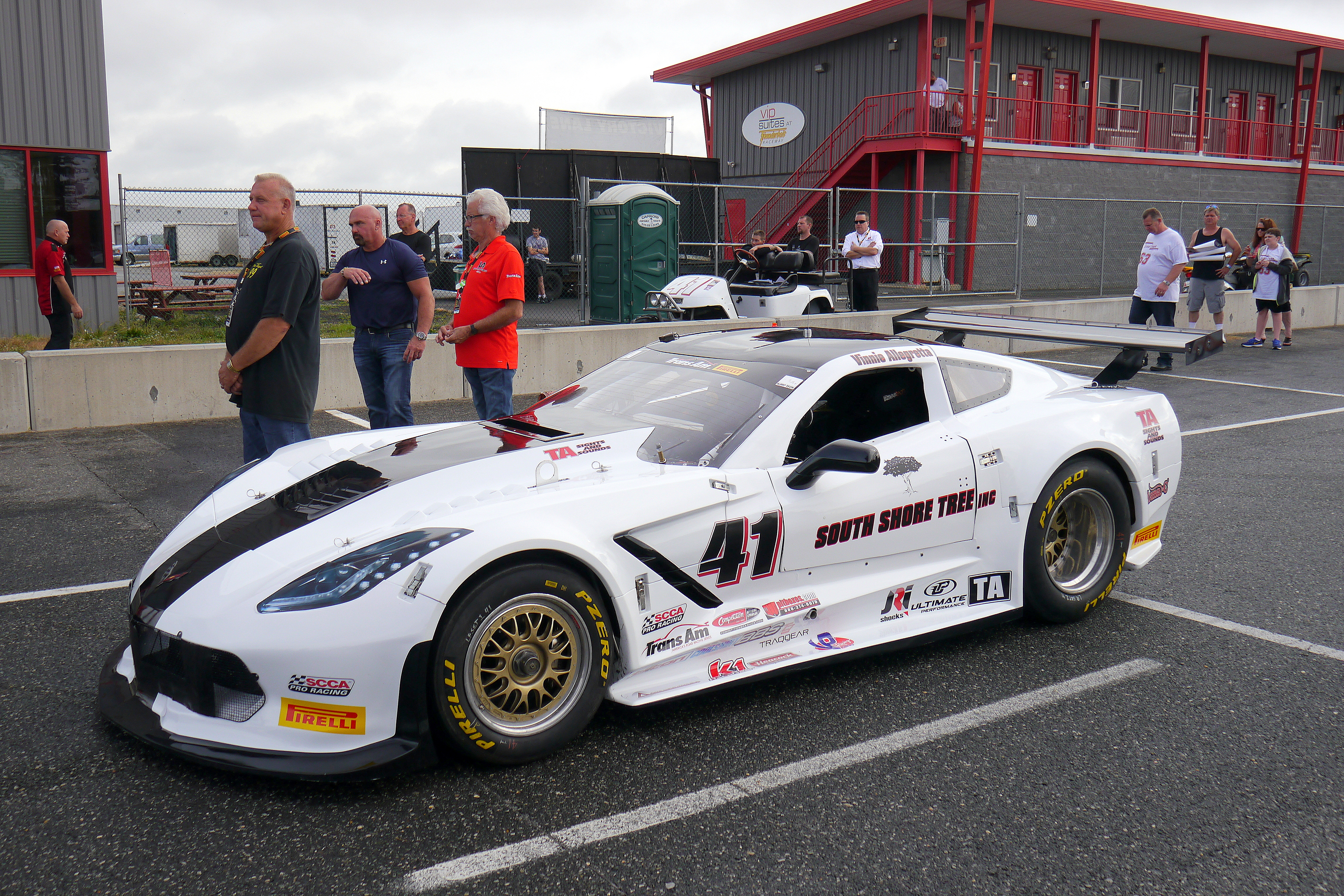
Vinnie Allegretta's Chevrolet Corvette C7

TA class cars are high-performance Grand Touring race cars with a tubular chassis and a Cadillac CTS-V, Chevrolet Camaro (Gen 6), Dodge Challenger (Gen 3), or Ford Mustang (Gen 6) full-scale replica body built by Advanced Composite Products or Derhaag Motorsports. All body types are eligible from the first year of production of the street car to five years after production ends. After each body model's full eligibility ends, each body will be partially eligible for an additional five years, and may be used in up to five races per year of eligibility. Cars may use a single-element rear wing.

Older body styles may continue to be used in the West Coast Championship, Northern Regional Cup, and Southern Regional Cup for an additional 10-years after partial-eligibility for the National Championship has ended. Cars using a Trans Am approved body model with bodies from alternate manufacturers that are approved to run in the SCCA Club GT1 class may be approved to run in the West Coast Championship, Northern Regional Cup, or Southern Regional Cup on a case-by-case basis.

Power comes from overhead valve (two per cylinder), pushrod, naturally aspirated, carbureted (single 4-barrel) 366 cubic inch (5.99 L) V8 engines producing 850+ horsepower. The minimum base weight is 2,780 pounds. Current rules allow for the use of leaded gasoline, whereas all other classes except XGT must use unleaded gas. Automatic transmissions are prohibited, and manual transmissions must have no more than five forward gear ratios, as well as a functional reverse gear. Sequential shifting transmissions are permitted, as well as commercially available No-Lift Shift (NLS) systems, and also "auto-blip" RPM matching systems for downshifting. Traction Control systems or devices that function independently of the driver are strictly prohibited, as is ABS (Anti-lock Braking System).

===== TA2 =====
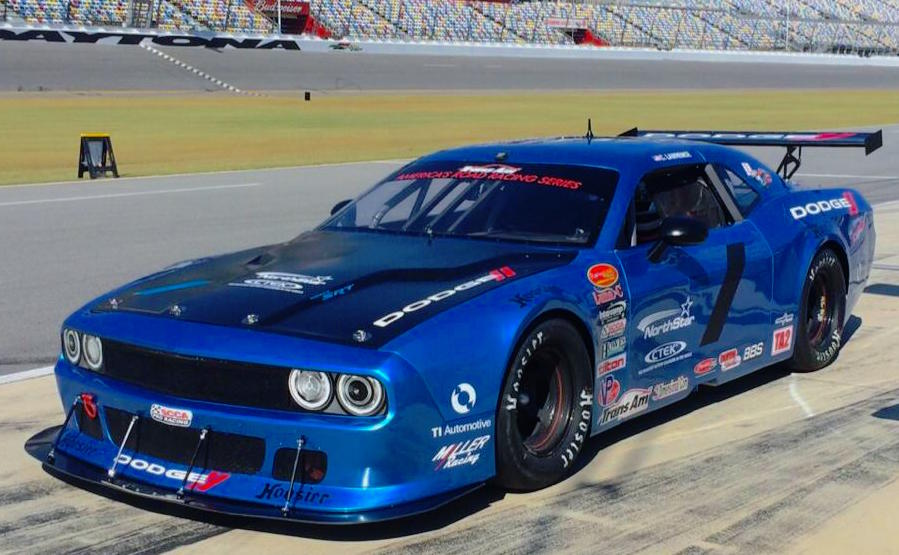
Cameron Lawrence gave Dodge its first ever Trans Am Series Championship in 2014

TA2 class rules specify a tubular chassis built by Howe Racing Enterprises, Mike Cope Racing, M-1 Motorsports, or Meissen Enterprises, and a Chevrolet Camaro (Gen 5 & 6), Ford Mustang (Gen 5 & 6), Dodge Challenger (Gen 3) body (full-scale replica) or Toyota Camry built by either Five Star Racing Race Car Bodies (Gen 6 Camaros / Mustangs), or Howe Racing Enterprises (all other eligible cars). The minimum base weight (including driver and any driver gear) for all cars is 2,830 pounds.

TA2 engines are similar to TA engines, except that they must be supplied by a Trans Am Approved and Certified Engine Builder/Rebuilder, and use fuel injection rather than a carburetor, as well as a Trans Am certified inlet restrictor plate, as maximum power is limited to 490 HP and 447 lb-ft of torque. Engines must comply with all TA2 engine regulations, and are sealed by the builder/rebuilder. As per current rules, "Nothing may direct or force air to the filter or housing." Transmissions must be commercially available, "H pattern" manual units with four forward gear ratios (1:1 fourth gear ratio, and no overdrive) and a reverse gear. Sequential shift mechanisms are not allowed, nor are shift-without-lift mechanisms. Traction Control devices or systems that function independently of the driver are strictly prohibited, as is ABS (Anti-lock Braking System).

The costs of shock absorbers, brake calipers and pads, and wheels are controlled, and no titanium or carbon fiber components are allowed. Only the driver's seat and Derhaag single plane rear wing may be constructed using carbon fiber.

TA2 is currently Trans Am's most popular class among competitors and has been exported internationally to Europe, Asia and Australia.

===== TA Cup =====
The TA Cup class was introduced in 2025 utilizing high-performance spec tube-frame vehicles with silhouette bodies, built by Chris Evans Inc. (CEI). After competing in the Western Championship’s XGT class since 2023, a new class was created for greater competition and differentiation between the single-builder cars and the production classes. The cars are rear-wheel drive, weighing 2,900 lb (1,300 kg), and use 18 inch Pirelli P ZERO slicks. The TA Cup cars produce 600 horsepower from previous generation of NASCAR engines.

==== Production based ====
===== XGT =====
New for 2020, the Xtreme Grand Touring (XGT) class will be used for former FIA Group GT3 cars whose homologation has expired under SRO and FIA regulations. During the 2019 Indianapolis Motor Speedway round, an Audi R8 whose GT3 homologation had expired was placed in the SGT class. After Trans Am Series officials and owners of former GT3 cars that could not be raced in a GT3 series following the expiration of the car's GT3 homologation had discussions, the series' officials announced that for the 2020 season, the "Xtreme Grand Touring" class will be part of the series. All original period-correct GT3 specifications will be enforced, and the series intends for 2016 and earlier cars that have had expired homologations to participate.

===== SGT =====
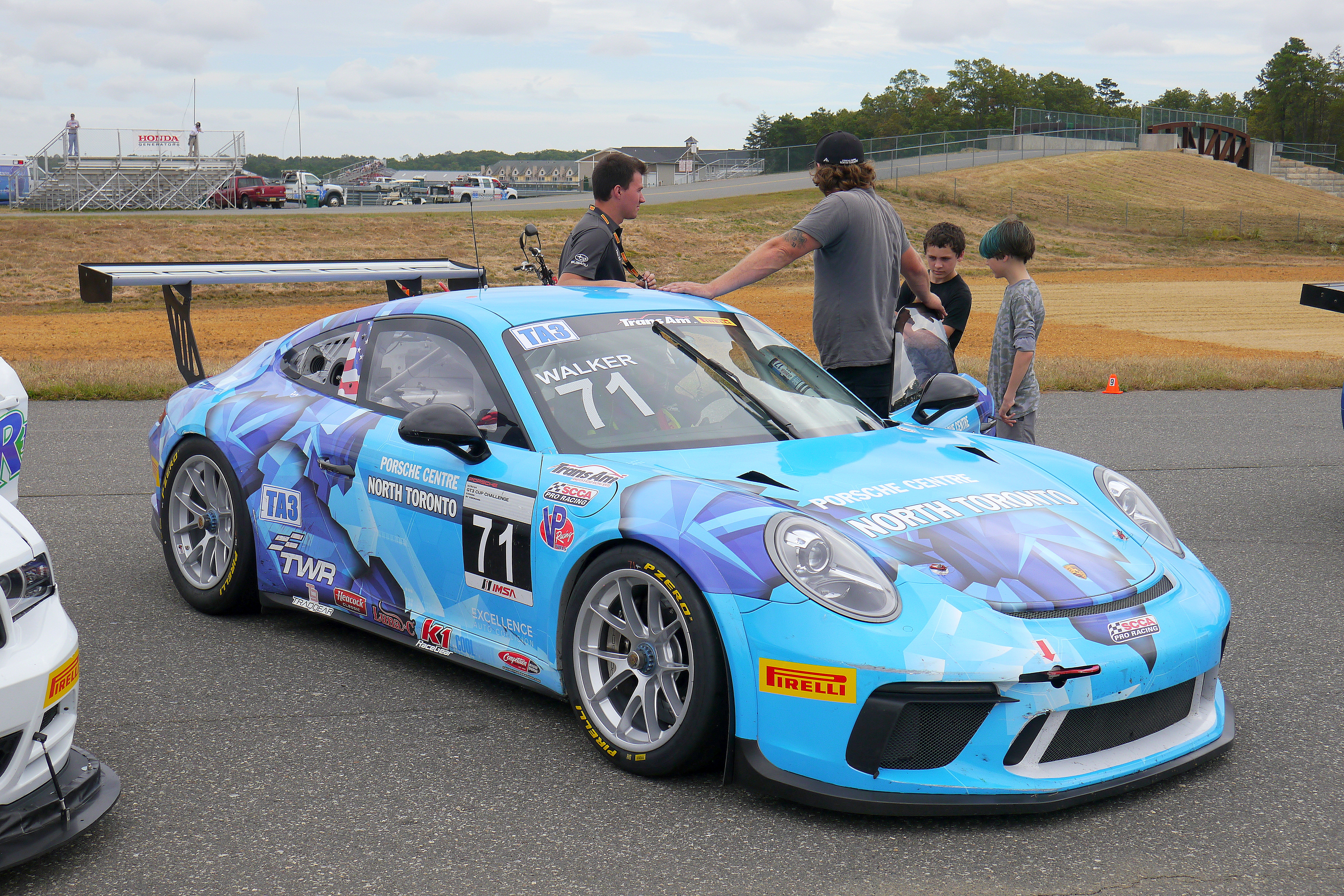
Cars such as this Porsche 991.2 are strong competitors in the SGT class

This class is intended to be a place for "... sports cars, grand touring cars, performance coupes, and performance sedans, all with their varying engines and drivetrain layouts..." to race. Unlike GT class cars, the current rules allow them to compete at a higher level of vehicle preparation. Some engines are required to have restrictor plates, for the purpose of equalizing performance. SGT class cars must be of a number of different specified domestic or foreign makes, models, and year of manufacture, from American "muscle cars", such as Chevy Corvettes and Camaros, Dodge Challengers and Vipers, and Ford Mustangs to European exotics like Aston Martins, Ferraris, Ginettas, Ligiers, McLarens, Mercedes-AMGs, Lamborghinis, Maseratis, Panozes, and Porsches, as well as Asian exotics, such as Acura NSXs. Eligible cars up to fifteen years old will now be able to race in the series, and for five years after that, partially eligible cars will be able to race in up to six races per year of eligibility. Standard body appearance must be maintained, including the OEM grille and badge. Aftermarket or OEM rear wings are allowed. As with GT, Tube frames are not allowed, but roll cages are mandatory. Minimum Vehicle Base Weights may be changed for the same purpose.

===== GT =====
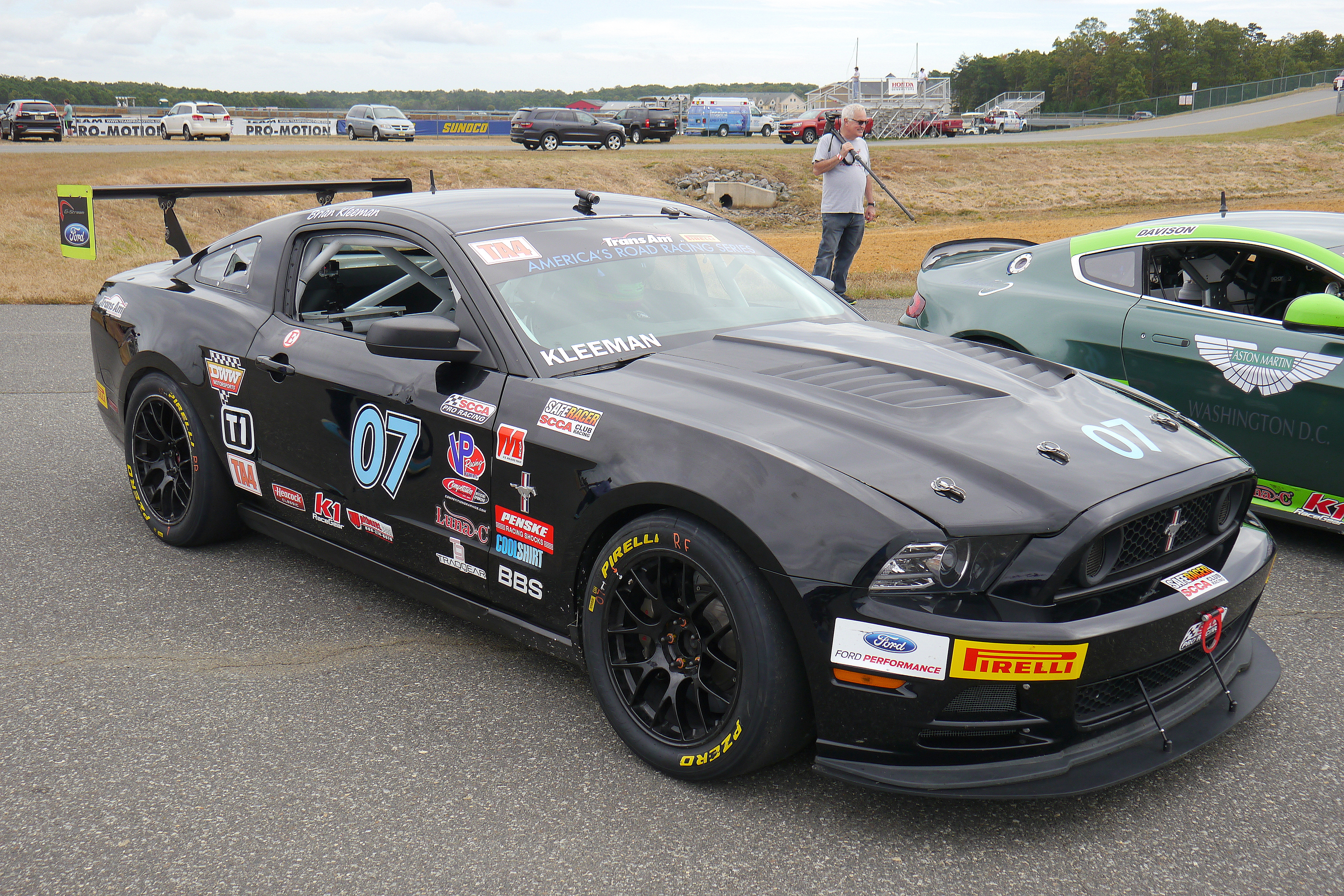
2017 Champion Brian Kleeman's 2013 Ford Mustang Boss 302

This class complies more with the classic Trans Am standards of "the glory era", and is the entry-level class of the three production-based classes within the Trans Am Series. "All vehicles must be production based, whether mass-production or limited-production, or a "kit car" that matches the look and performance of the GT class, and is available to the general public" (including 'track specific' models), such as Ford Mustangs, Chevrolet Camaros, Dodge Vipers, Nissan 350Zs, Porsche Caymans, or Mercedes-AMGs, and many more. The class is intended to be a competition between late model, nearly stock, high-performance cars, and as the introductory level for Trans Am Series beginners to start racing. As with the SGT class, there is a fifteen-year period of full eligibility, and a five-year period of partial eligibility for eligible makes and models where a maximum of six races may be run. OEM rear spoilers/wings may be used. As with SGT, some engines are required to have approved restrictor plates, for the purpose of equalizing performance. Minimum Vehicle Base Weights are adjusted depending on optional components used.

==== List of Cars ====
Manufacturer	Chassis	Image	Debut	Category
Aston Martin	Vantage		2020	GT
Aston Martin	Vantage GT3		2020	XGT
Aston Martin	Vantage GT4		2020	SGT
Aston Martin	Vantage V8 GT4		2021	SGT
Audi	R8 GT3 Ultra		2020	XGT
Audi	R8 GT4		2020	SGT
Audi	R8 LMS Ultra		2020	XGT
BMW	E90 M3		2020	GT
BMW	E92 M3		2020	GT
BMW	E92 M3		2020	SGT
BMW	M4 GT4		2020	SGT
Cadillac	CTS-V		2015	TA
Chevrolet	Camaro		2011	TA2
Chevrolet	Camaro		2017	TA2
Chevrolet	Camaro		2020	GT
Chevrolet	Corvette		2020	SGT
Chevrolet	Corvette		2020	XGT
Chevrolet	Corvette C5		2009	TA
Chevrolet	Corvette C6		2015	TA
Chevrolet	Corvette C7			TA
Chevrolet	Holden		2020	SGT
Chevrolet	Impala		2012	TA2
Chevrolet	Monte Carlo		2012	TA2
Dodge	Challenger		2014	TA2
Dodge	Challenger		2020	TA
Dodge	Viper		2020	SGT
Factory Five	GTM		2020	SGT
Ford	Mustang		2020	GT
Ford	Mustang		2009	TA
Ford	Mustang		2013	TA2
Ford	Mustang		2020	SGT
Ford	Mustang GT4		2020	SGT
Ford	Mustang V			GT
Ford	Mustang VI			TA
Jaguar	XKR		2009	TA
Mercedes	AMG GT3		2020	XGT
Pontiac	GTO		2013	TA2
Porsche	911 GT3 R		2020	XGT
Porsche	991 GT3 Cup		2020	SGT
Porsche	991.1 GT3 Cup		2020	SGT
Porsche	991.2			SGT
Porsche	997		2011	TA2
Porsche	Cayman GT4		2021	SGT
Porsche	GT4 Clubsport		2020	GT
Toyota	Camry		2025	TA2

=== Championships and awards ===
Originally, Manufacturers' Championship points were awarded in all classes to the top 6 finishing positions of each make of car: 9-6-4-3-2-1. Beginning in 1972, the SCCA instituted a Drivers' Championship that would be based on overall finishing position from 1st through 10th places: 20-15-12-10-8-6-4-3-2-1. Beginning in 1990, the top 25 finishers were awarded points as follows: 30-27-25-23-21-19-18-17-16-15-14-13-12-11-10-9-8-7-6-5-4-3-2-1-1.

Currently, Manufacturers' Championship points are earned in exactly the same manner as they were originally. (*Vehicles must be classified as finishers to score Manufacturers' points.) Final point standings ties will be decided by which manufacturer has more wins, second-place finishes, etc., as necessary to determine the winner.

Series Champions in each of the four competition classes are determined based on points accumulated during the season. Drivers' Championship points are awarded as follows: At each race, after Qualifying has been completed, 3 points are awarded to the First Qualifier, 2 to the Second Qualifier, and 1 to the Third Qualifier. The top 24 finishers in each class, at each race are awarded points as follows: 30-27-25-23-21-20-19-18-17-16-15-14-13-12-11-10-9-8-7-6-5-4-3-2. All other finishers are awarded 1 point, provided the driver is classified as a starter. After the first green flag lap of a race, 1 point is awarded to any driver leading a lap in class, as well as 1 point for leading the most laps in class for each race. "In the event qualifying was not held due to any reason, Drivers Championship points will not be awarded." (A driver must be classified as a starter to score Championship points.)

The West Coast Championship Series operates just like the national championship. Points earned at shared events only count toward the series that the driver / team is currently entered in. If a race counts toward more than one championship series, a driver wishing to earn points for more than one championship must formally enter each series.

After the results of each race are "final", the COOLSHIRT Systems "Cool Move of the Race" Award (If applicable, it is given to the outstanding driver of the race, and the "move" could also be a 'move up through the field'.), pitboxes.com Crew Award, and Traq Gear Crew Chief Award are given out.

Series Champions are awarded the brand new for 2017 Trigon Trophy (sponsored by 3-Dimensional Services Group, and custom designed by longtime partner Crystal Sensations). According to The Trans Am Race Company, LLC President John Claggett, "The base is shaped as a "D"... The crystal is essentially 3 sided... thus... the Trigon Trophy reflects the sponsorship. And yes... They are beautiful." The Trans Am Series' traditional colors are red and black, and Pirelli's color is yellow, with The Trigon Trophies incorporating those design elements.

2018 introduced the Northern Cup and Southern Cup Regional sub-championships for teams that either do not wish to, or cannot run the entire race schedule, and have run a limited number of races in the past. There are very specific requirements for entry into the regional championships, as they are intended to allow drivers to try competing in the series before committing to running the full schedule of events. A driver / team may earn points in one or both championship series, or either the Northern or Southern Cup sub-championship series, but not in both a sub-championship series and also a championship series.

Also new for 2018 is the Master's Championship, which is intended to recognize drivers still actively competing on the racetrack who are over 65 years of age. Again, the points schedule for driver's championship points will be used. The highest finishing Master's Championship driver in each class will be recognized during the podium ceremony after each race. At the end of the year, the top three Master's Championship drivers in each regional series will be recognized at the series awards banquet.

Rookie of the Year winners in each class are also determined by points accumulated during the season.

New for 2018 is the Trans Am Team Championship, with points being awarded to each car/car number. Multiple drivers may compete in the same car / car number in order to earn points towards the Team Championship. The number of points earned follows the same methodology as in the Driver's Championship (according to finishing position), but as the rule book states, "In addition to the points earned on-track, teams will be judged by several factors that embody a professional team and help promote, and improve, the Series".

For the 2021 season, the Trans Am Series in partnership with the Sports Car Club of America created the Pro/Am Challenge. The Pro/Am Challenge allows SCCA drivers to compete in Trans Am using the 2021 SCCA road racing rulebook for their cars, making the transition back and forth between the SCCA Road Racing program and Trans Am much easier. This secondary championship is open to all five Trans Am classes and the primary SCCA classes that fit into these Trans Am classes are GT1, GT2, GTX, T1, T2, T3 and STO. The various cars are balanced into the correct Trans Am class with minor weight and restrictor changes. The Pro/Am Challenge requires competitors to compete in the two specific Pro/Am Challenge rounds and pick four other Trans Am Series or West Coast Trans Am Series races in which they will earn points. Points are awarded using the same system as the main Trans Am Series championship.

*See current rule book for complete information on all Trans Am Series rules and regulations.

== Title sponsorship ==
The series has by at least twenty different names through the years. Some were linked to sponsors, some not:

- CRC Chemicals Trans-Am Championship (1981–1983)
- SCCA Budweiser Trans-Am Championship (1983–1984)
- SCCA Bendix Brakes Trans-Am Championship (1985–1987)
- SCCA Escort Trans-Am Series (1988)
- SCCA Liquid Tide Trans-Am Tour (1991)
- SCCA Tide Trans-Am Tour (1992)
- NTB Trans-Am Series (1998)
- BFGoodrich Trans-Am Series (1999–2000)
- Trans-Am Series for the BFGoodrich Cup (2001–2002)
- Motorock Trans-Am Tour for the BFGoodrich Cup (2003)
- Motorock Trans-Am Series (2004)
- Muscle Milk SCCA Trans-Am Series (2009)
- Trans-Am Series presented by Pirelli (2017-present)

== Manufacturers / drivers championships ==
=== National championship ===
Year	Champion manufacturer	Champion driver	Car	Team / Sponsor
1966	Over 2-liter – (United States) Ford	Not awarded		
1966	Under 2-liter – (Italy) Alfa Romeo	Not awarded		
1967	Over 2-liter – (United States) Ford	Not awarded		
1967	Under 2-liter – (Germany) Porsche	Not awarded		
1968	Over 2-liter – (United States) Chevrolet	Not awarded		
1968	Under 2-liter – (Germany) Porsche	Not awarded		
1969	Over 2-liter – (United States) Chevrolet	Not awarded		
1969	Under 2-liter – (Germany) Porsche	Not awarded		
1970	Over 2-liter – (United States) Ford	Not awarded		
1970	Under 2-liter – (Italy) Alfa Romeo	Not awarded		
1971	Over 2.5-liter – (United States) American Motors	Not awarded		
1971	Under 2.5-liter – (Japan) Datsun	Not awarded		
1972	Over 2.5-liter – (United States) American Motors	Over 2.5-liter – (United States) George Follmer	AMC Javelin	Roy Woods Racing
1972	Under 2.5-liter – (Japan) Datsun	Under 2.5-liter – (United States) John Morton	Datsun 510	Brock Racing Enterprises
1973	(Germany) Porsche	(United States) Peter Gregg	Porsche 911	Brumos Porsche
1974	(Germany) Porsche	(United States) Peter Gregg	Porsche 911	Brumos Porsche
1975	(United States) Chevrolet	(United States) John Greenwood	Chevrolet Corvette	John Greenwood Racing
1976	Cat. 1 – (United States) American Motors	Cat. 1 – (United States) Jocko Maggiacomo	AMC Javelin	Jocko's
1976	Cat. 2 – (Germany) Porsche	Cat. 2 – (United States) George Follmer	Porsche 934	Vasek Polak Racing
1977	Cat. 1 – (Germany) Porsche	Cat. 1 – (United States) Bob Tullius	Jaguar XJS	Group 44
1977	Cat. 2 – (Germany) Porsche	Cat. 2 – (Canada) Ludwig Heimrath	Porsche 934	Heimrath Racing
1978	Cat. 1 – (United Kingdom) Jaguar	Cat. 1 – (United States) Bob Tullius	Jaguar XJS	Group 44
1978	Cat. 2 – (United States) Chevrolet	Cat. 2 – (United States) Greg Pickett	Chevrolet Corvette	Pickett Racing
1979	Cat. 1 – (United States) Chevrolet	Cat. 1 – (United States) Gene Bothello	Chevrolet Corvette	FEMSA/Kennedy
1979	Cat. 2 – (Germany) Porsche	Cat. 2 – (United States) John Paul, Sr.	Porsche 935	John Paul, Sr.
1980	(Germany) Porsche	(United States) John Bauer	Porsche 911	Larry Green Racing
1981	(United States) Chevrolet	(Canada) Eppie Wietzes	Chevrolet Corvette	Swiss Chalet
1982	(United States) Pontiac	(United States) Elliott Forbes-Robinson	Pontiac Firebird	Huffaker Engineering
1983	(United States) Chevrolet	(United Kingdom) David Hobbs	Chevrolet Camaro	DeAtley Motorsports
1984	(United States) Lincoln Mercury	(United States) Tom Gloy	Mercury Capri	Lane Sports Racing
1985	(United States) Lincoln Mercury	(United States) Wally Dallenbach Jr.	Mercury Capri	Roush Racing
1986	(United States) Lincoln Mercury	(United States) Wally Dallenbach Jr.	Mercury Capri	Selix/Protofab Racing
1987	(United States) Lincoln Mercury	(United States) Scott Pruett	Merkur XR4Ti	Roush Racing
1988	(Germany) Audi	(United States) Hurley Haywood	Audi 200 Quattro Turbo	Group 44
1989	(United States) Ford	(United States) Dorsey Schroeder	Ford Mustang	Roush Racing
1990	(United States) Chevrolet	(United States) Tommy Kendall	Chevrolet Beretta	Spice Engineering
1991	(United States) Chevrolet	(United States) Scott Sharp	Chevrolet Camaro	American Equipment Racing
1992	(United States) Chevrolet	(United States) Jack Baldwin	Chevrolet Camaro	American Equipment Racing
1993	(United States) Chevrolet	(United States) Scott Sharp	Chevrolet Camaro	American Equipment Racing
1994	(United States) Ford	(United States) Scott Pruett	Chevrolet Camaro	American Equipment Racing
1995	(United States) Ford	(United States) Tommy Kendall	Ford Mustang	Roush Racing
1996	(United States) Ford	(United States) Tommy Kendall	Ford Mustang	Roush Racing
1997	(United States) Ford	(United States) Tommy Kendall	Ford Mustang	Roush Racing
1998	(United States) Chevrolet	(United States) Paul Gentilozzi	Chevrolet Corvette	Rocketsports Racing
1999	(United States) Ford	(United States) Paul Gentilozzi	Ford Mustang	Rocketsports Racing
2000	(United States) Ford	(United States) Brian Simo	Qvale Mangusta	Huffaker/Qvale Motorsports
2001	(United Kingdom) Jaguar	(United States) Paul Gentilozzi	Jaguar XKR	Rocketsports Racing
2002	(United States) Ford	(United States) Boris Said	Panoz Esperante	ACS Express Racing
2003	(United Kingdom) Jaguar	(United States) Scott Pruett	Jaguar XKR	Rocketsports Racing
2004	(United Kingdom) Jaguar	(United States) Paul Gentilozzi	Jaguar XKR	Rocketsports Racing
2005	(United Kingdom) Jaguar	(Germany) Klaus Graf	Jaguar XKR	Rocketsports Racing
2006	--- Not Awarded ---	(United States) Paul Gentilozzi	Jaguar XKR	Rocketsports Racing
2007	--- No Trans-Am Series ---			
2008	--- No Trans-Am Series ---			
2009	(United Kingdom) Jaguar	(United States) Tomy Drissi	Jaguar XKR	Rocketsports Racing
2010	(United States) Chevrolet	(United States) Tony Ave	Chevrolet Corvette	Lamers Racing
2011	(United States) Chevrolet	TA1: (United States) Tony Ave	Chevrolet Corvette	Lamers Racing
2011	(United States) Chevrolet	TA2: (United States) Bob Stretch	Chevrolet Camaro	Fix Rim Mobile Wheel Repair
2012	(United States) Chevrolet	TA: (United States) Simon Gregg	Chevrolet Corvette	Derhaag Motorsports
2012	(United States) Chevrolet	TA2: (United States) Bob Stretch	Chevrolet Camaro	Fix Rim Mobile Wheel Repair
2012	(United States) Ford	GGT: (United States) Chuck Cassaro	Panoz Esperante GTS	Cassaro Racing
2013	(United States) Chevrolet	TA: (United States) Doug Peterson	Chevrolet Corvette	Tony Ave Racing
2013	(United States) Chevrolet	TA2: (United States) Cameron Lawrence	Chevrolet Camaro	Miller Racing
2013	(United States) Ford	TA3-American Muscle: (United States) Chuck Cassaro	Ford Mustang	Cassaro Racing
2013	(Germany) Porsche	TA3-International: (United States) David C. Seuss	Porsche 996 GT3	Northern Light
2014	(United States) Chevrolet	TA: (United States) Doug Peterson	Chevrolet Corvette	Tony Ave Racing
2014	(United States) Dodge	TA2: (United States) Cameron Lawrence	Dodge Challenger	Miller Racing
2014	(United States) Chevrolet	TA3-American Muscle: (United States) Ernie Francis Jr.	Chevrolet Camaro	Breathless Performance Racing
2014	(United States) Chevrolet	TA3-International: (United States) Jason Berkeley	Chevrolet Corvette C6R	BMG Management
2015	(United States) Chevrolet	TA: (United States) Amy Ruman	Chevrolet Corvette	Ruman Racing
2015	(United States) Chevrolet	TA2: (United States) Gar Robinson	Chevrolet Camaro	Robinson Racing
2015	(United States) Chevrolet	TA3-American Muscle: (United States) Ernie Francis Jr.	Chevrolet Camaro	Breathless Performance Racing
2015	(United States) Dodge	TA3-International: (United States) Lee Saunders	Dodge Viper	V10 PWR Racing
2016	(United States) Chevrolet	TA: (United States) Amy Ruman	Chevrolet Corvette	Ruman Racing
2016	(United States) Ford	TA2: (United States) Tony Buffomante	Ford Mustang	Mike Cope Racing
2016	(Germany) BMW	TA3: (United States) Randy Mueller	BMW M3	Epic Motorsports
2016	(United States) Ford	TA4: (United States) Ernie Francis Jr.	Ford Mustang	Breathless Performance Racing
2016	(Germany) Porsche	TA5: (United States) Tim Kezman	Porsche 997	Fall-Line Motorsports
2017	(United States) Ford	TA: (United States) Ernie Francis Jr.	Ford Mustang	Breathless Performance Racing
2017	(United States) Chevrolet	TA2: (United States) Gar Robinson	Chevrolet Camaro	Robinson Racing
2017	(Germany) Porsche	TA3: (United States) Mark Boden	Porsche 991 GT3 Cup	Fall-Line Motorsports
2017	(United States) Ford	TA4: (United States) Brian Kleeman	Ford Mustang	DWW Motorsports
2018	(United States) Ford	TA: (United States) Ernie Francis Jr.	Ford Mustang / Chevrolet Camaro	Breathless Performance Racing
2018	(United States) Chevrolet	TA2: (Brazil) Rafa Matos	Chevrolet Camaro	Coleman Motorsports
2018	(United Kingdom) Ginetta	TA3: (Brazil) Alline Cipriani	Ginetta G55	Ginetta USA Racing
2018	(United Kingdom) Ginetta	TA4: (United States) Warren Dexter	Ginetta G55	Dexter Racing
2019	(United States) Ford	TA: (United States) Ernie Francis Jr.	Ford Mustang	Breathless Performance Racing
2019	(United States) Chevrolet	TA2: (United States) Marc Miller	Dodge Challenger	Stevens-Miller Racing
2019	(Germany) Porsche	SGT: (United States) Mark Boden	Porsche 991 GT3 Cup	Fall-Line Motorsports
2019	(United Kingdom) Aston Martin	GT: (United States) Steven Davison	Aston Martin Vantage	Automatic Racing
2020	(United States) Ford	TA: (United States) Ernie Francis Jr.	Ford Mustang	Breathless Performance Racing
2020	(United States) Chevrolet	TA2: (United States) Mike Skeen	Chevrolet Camaro / Ford Mustang	Stevens-Miller Racing
2020	(Germany) Audi	XGT: (United States) Ken Thwaits	Audi R8 GT3 Ultra	Showtime Motorsports
2020	(United States) Dodge	SGT: (United States) Lee Saunders	Dodge Viper	V10 PWR Racing
2020	(United States) Ford	GT: (United States) Billy Griffin	Ford Mustang	Griffin Motorsports
2021	(United States) Ford	TA: (United States) Chris Dyson	Ford Mustang	CD Racing / Plaid / ALTWELL CBD
2021	(United States) Ford	TA2: (Brazil) Rafa Matos	Ford Mustang	3 Dimensional Services
2021	(Germany) Porsche	XGT: (United States) Erich Joiner	Porsche 991 GT3 R	Good Boy Bob Coffee
2021	(United States) Chevrolet	SGT: (United States) Justin Oakes	Chevrolet Corvette	Droneworks
2021	(United States) Ford	GT: (United States) Philip Di Pippo	Ford Mustang	Sasco Sports
2022	(United States) Ford	TA: (United States) Chris Dyson	Ford Mustang	CD Racing / Gym Weed / Altwell
2022	(United States) Ford	TA2: (United States) Thomas Merrill	Ford Mustang	Mike Cope Racing
2022	(Germany) Audi / Porsche	XGT: (United States) Danny Lowry	Audi R8 LMS / Porsche 911 GT3 Cup	Bridgehaul / Bennett / Pitboxes
2022	(Germany) Porsche	SGT: (United States) Milton Grant	Porsche 911 (991.1)	Sentry Self Storage / Springhill Suites
2022	(United States) Ford	GT: (United States) Billy Griffin	Ford Mustang	Griffin Auto Care / Sheehan Towing
2023	(United States) Ford	TA: (United States) Chris Dyson	Ford Mustang	CD Racing / Gym Weed
2023	(United States) Ford	TA2: (United States) Brent Crews	Ford Mustang	Nitro Motorsports
2023	(Germany) Mercedes-AMG	XGT: (United States) Danny Lowry	Mercedes-AMG GT3	Bridgehaul / Bennett Family of Co.
2023	(United States) Ford / Dodge	SGT: (United States) Lee Saunders	Ford Mustang / Dodge Viper	Landsearch LLC
2023	(Germany) Audi	GT: (United States) Michael Attaway	Audi R8	Bennett / Bridgehaul / Pitboxes.com
2024	(United States) Ford	TA: (United States) Paul Menard	Ford Mustang	Menards
2024	(United States) Ford	TA2: (Brazil) Rafa Matos	Ford Mustang	Nitro Motorsports
2024	(Germany) Mercedes-AMG	XGT: (United States) Danny Lowry	Mercedes-AMG GT3	Bridgehaul / Bennett Family of Co.
2024	(United States) Chevrolet	SGT: (United States) Kaylee Bryson	Chevrolet Corvette	Logical Systems / Sam Pierce Chevrolet
2024	(Italy) Maserati	GT: (United States) Chris Coffey	Maserati GranTurismo MC GT4	Norwood Auto Italia
2025	(United States) Ford	TA: (United States) Paul Menard	Ford Mustang	Pittsburgh Paints / Menards
2025	(United States) Chevrolet	TA2: (United States) Tristan McKee	Chevrolet Camaro	Spire Gainbridge SLR / M1
2025	(United States) Chevrolet	XGT: (United States) Kaylee Bryson	Chevrolet Corvette	Logical Systems Inc
2025	(United States) Ford	SGT: (United States) Joshua Carlson	Ford Mustang	Enseva / Diercks Ltd / TC Fab
2025	(Italy) Maserati	GT: (United States) Chris Coffey	Maserati GranTurismo MC GT4	Norwood Auto Italia / Traffic Grafix
2025	(United States) Ford	GT1: (United States) Jon DeGaynor	Ford Mustang	Speed Dream'n Racing

NOTE: In 1980, the Sports Car Club of America retroactively named an overall drivers' championships for all pre-1972 seasons, using the points system of the time to calculate drivers' championships. The SCCA and the Trans-Am Series now recognise these drivers as series champions.

=== West coast championship ===
Year	Champion manufacturer	Champion driver	Car	Team or sponsor
2017	(United States) Ford	TA: (United States) Greg Pickett	Ford Mustang	Pickett Racing
2017	(United States) Chevrolet	TA2: (United States) Shane Lewis	Chevrolet Camaro	Pura Vida Tequila / 74 Ranch Resort
2017	(United States) Chevrolet	TA3: (United States) Oli Thordarson	Chevrolet Corvette	Alvaka Networks / Trackspec Motorsports
2017	(Italy) Maserati	TA4: (United States) Guy Dreier	Maserati GranTurismo MC GT4	Guy Dreier Designs
2018	(United States) Chevrolet	TA: (United States) Tomy Drissi	Chevrolet Camaro	GoShare
2018	(United States) Ford	TA2: (United States) Thomas Merrill	Ford Mustang	Big Diehl Racing
2018	(United States) Chevrolet	TA3: (United States) Oli Thordarson	Chevrolet Corvette	Alvaka Networks / Trackspec Motorsports
2018	(United States) Ford	TA4: (United States) Dane Jorgenson-Smith	Ford Mustang	Bob Smith Motors
2019	(United States) Chevrolet	TA: (United States) Simon Gregg	Chevrolet Corvette	Derhaag Motorsports
2019	(United States) Ford	TA2: (United States) Brad McAllister	Ford Mustang	www.PortlandImplantDentistry.com
2019	(United States) Factory Five	SGT: (United States) Carl Rydquist	Factory Five GTM	www.MyRaceShop.com / Tel Tac
2019	(United States) Ford	GT: (United States) Roger Eagleton	Ford Mustang	Five Star Property Mgmt. / Energy Real Estate
2020	(United States) Ford	TA: (United States) Greg Pickett	Ford Mustang	Pickett Racing
2020	(United States) Ford	TA2: (United States) Jim Gallaugher	Ford Mustang	Madison Development Group
2020	(Germany) Mercedes-AMG	XGT: (United States) Simon Gregg	Mercedes-AMG GT3	Derhaag Motorsports
2020	(United States) Factory Five	SGT: (United States) Carl Rydquist	Factory Five GTM	MyRaceShop.com / Tel-Mac / Mendeola
2020	(United States) Chevrolet	GT: (United States) Joe Bogetich	Chevrolet Camaro	Westover Corporation
2021	(United States) Chevrolet	TA: (United States) Steve Goldman	Chevrolet Corvette	LIG Racing
2021	(United States) Ford	TA2: (United States) Carl Rydquist	Ford Mustang	RaceCars4Rent / Group Wholesale
2021	(Germany) Porsche	XGT: (United States) Erich Joiner	Porsche 991 GT3 R	Good Boy Bob Coffee Roaster
2021	(Australia) Holden	SGT: (United States) John Schweitzer	Holden Monaro	Superior Builders Inc.
2022	(United States) Ford	TA: (United States) Greg Pickett	Ford Mustang	Altwell CBD / Gym weed
2022	(United States) Chevrolet	TA2: (United States) Jeff Holden	Chevrolet Camaro	Mid Valley Trans / Joe's Racing Products
2022	(United States) Ford	XGT: (United States) Howard Johnston	Ford Mustang	IWS Acquisition Group
2022	(United States) Ford	SGT: (United States) Chris Evans	Ford Mustang	Chris Evans Inc.
2022	(United Kingdom) McLaren	GT: (United States) Xuanqian Wang	McLaren 570S GT4	AURALIC North America
2023	(United States) Chevrolet	TA: (United States) Steve Goldman	Chevrolet Corvette	LIG Racing
2023	(United States) Ford	TA2: (Canada) Brody Goble	Ford Mustang	Brown Brothers Ford / Cortex Performance
2023	(United States) Chevrolet	XGT: (United States) Will Rodgers	Chevrolet Camaro / Ford Mustang	Central Welding Supply
2023	(United States) Ford	SGT: (United States) Rudy Revak	Ford Mustang / Pontiac Grand Prix	Xyngular
2023	(United States) Chevrolet	GT: (United States) JC Meynet	Chevrolet Corvette	Killer Shrimp Racing
2024	(United States) Chevrolet	TA: (United States) Steve Goldman	Chevrolet Corvette	LIG Racing
2024	(United States) Ford	TA2: (United States) Michael LaPaglia	Ford Mustang	Papini's Garage / Fast Auto
2024	(United States) Ford	XGT: (United States) Chris Evans	Ford Mustang	Central Welding Supply
2024	(Germany) Porsche	SGT: (United States) David Hampton	Porsche Cayman GT4 RS	AR Motorsports
2024	(Germany) Porsche	GT: (United States) David Hampton	Porsche Cayman GT4 RS	AR Motorsports
2025	(United States) Ford	TA: (Canada) Cole Boudreau	Ford Mustang	Boudreau Racing
2025	(United States) Ford	TA2: (Canada) Brody Goble	Ford Mustang	Brown Bros Ford Lincoln
2025	(Germany) Porsche	XGT: (United States) Simon Asselin	Porsche 991.2 GT3 Cup	Infillion
2025	(Germany) Porsche	SGT: (United States) JD Koos	Porsche 991.1 GT3 Cup	Nicole Douglas Design
2025	(United States) Dodge	TA Cup: (United States) Ken Sutherland	Dodge Challenger	Kallberg Racing

== Class championships by manufacturer ==
Manufacturer	Championships
Ford	51
Chevrolet	44
Porsche	16
Jaguar	6
Dodge	5
American Motors (AMC)	3
Alfa Romeo	2
Audi	2
Datsun	2
Factory Five	2
Ginetta	2
Maserati	2
Aston Martin	1
BMW	1
Panoz	1
Pontiac	1
Qvale	1
Mercedes-AMG	1

== Other series based on the format ==
The Trans-Am Series has used tube-frame / silhouette cars, similar to the original IMSA GT Series, since the early 1980s, with heavy emphasis on GT cars. The SCCA Pro Racing World Challenge and Continental Tire Sports Car Challenge racing series, run by the Sports Car Club of America (SCCA), and the International Motor Sports Association (IMSA), respectively, utilize modified production-based cars, sports cars, and touring cars, similar in spirit to the Trans-Am Series since the 1980s. With the rise of these other series, Trans-Am saw decreased attention from the media, however, Speedvision did occasionally cover Trans-Am races.

There are two popular TA2-based racing series in Australia, see Trans-Am racing in Australia.

== See also ==
- List of Trans-Am Series marques
- Trans-Am production cars

== Bibliography ==
- Bochroch, Albert R. (1986). Trans-Am: The Pony Car Wars, 1966-1972. Motorbooks International. ISBN 978-0879382292.
- Tom, David (2020). The Cars of Trans-Am Racing: 1966–1972. CarTech Inc. ISBN 978-1613252697.
- Lipetz, Daniel (2021). The Trans-Am Era: 1966-1972 in Photographs. David Bull Publishing. ISBN 978-1935075769.
- Holmes, Steve (2024). Trans-Am Challengers: The Cars That Rivalled Mustang and Camaro Supremacy 1966-1972. Veloce Publishing. ISBN 978-1836440345.
