= Tommy Kendall =

American racing driver (born 1966)

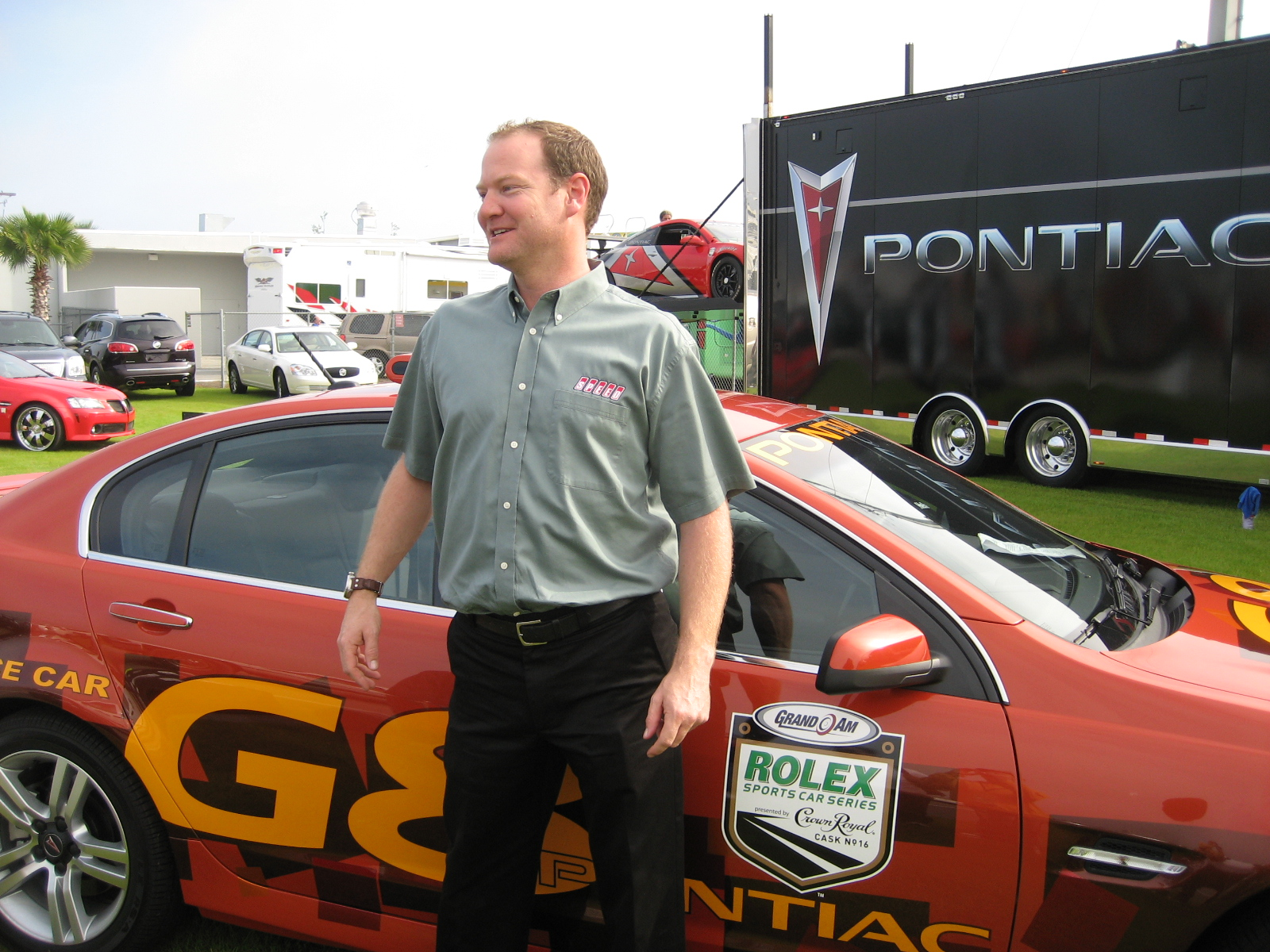
- Kendall at Daytona International Speedway for the 2008 24 Hours of Daytona
- Nationality: (United States) American
- Born: October 17, 1966 (age 60) Santa Monica, California, U.S.
- Categorisation: FIA Platinum (until 2013); FIA Gold (2014–2016); FIA Silver (2017–)
- Achievements: Trans-Am Series champion (1990, 1995, 1996, 1997)
- Awards: Motorsports Hall of Fame of America (2015); West Coast Stock Car Hall of Fame (2021)

NASCAR Cup Series career
- 14 races run over 10 years
- Best finish: 47th (1990)
- First race: 1987 Winston Western 500 (Riverside)
- Last race: 1998 The Bud At The Glen (Watkins Glen)
Wins	Top tens	Poles
0	1	0

NASCAR O'Reilly Auto Parts Series career
- 1 race run over 1 year
- Best finish: 85th (1990
- First race: 1990 NE Chevy 250 (Loudon
Wins	Top tens	Poles
0	0	0

24 Hours of Le Mans career
- Years: 2000, 2013
- Teams: Konrad Motorsport, SRT Motorsports
- Best finish: 14th

Tommy Kendall (born October 17, 1966) is an American race car driver and television broadcaster. He is best known for his IMSA GT Championship and SCCA Trans-Am Series career.

== Racing career ==
Son of race driver Charles Kendall, Kendall began his racing career competing at the IMSA GT Championship. He drove a Mazda RX-7 in the GTU category while studying and by the time he completed his studies, he took the 1986 and 1987 championships. Later he won three other titles in the same car, which he still owns.

Kendall later dominated the SCCA Trans-Am Series in the 1990s, scoring four series championships. His greatest year came in 1997, when he won eleven races in a row out of the thirteen on the schedule—almost a perfect season. During this time, Kendall was also honored by representing the series for six IROC seasons.

Kendall ran in fourteen NASCAR Cup Series races between 1987 and 1998. He raced primarily only on road courses as a road course ringer, and scored one Top-10 finish. He nearly won the 1991 Banquet Frozen Foods 300K at Sears Point Raceway, in which he led twelve laps before cutting a tire with two laps to go following a late-race collision with Mark Martin. The two drivers, who were briefly Roush Fenway Racing teammates in Trans-Am, would not speak about the incident for years until they rehashed their late-race collision on Martin's podcast, twenty years later.

While competing in Winston Cup as a ringer, Kendall had a single start in the NASCAR Busch Series. Kendall also had one start with Dick Johnson Racing at the 1996 AMP Bathurst 1000 in Australia co-driving with Steven Johnson, the son of team boss Dick Johnson. Johnson and Kendall finished eighth in their Ford EF Falcon. Of the American drivers who have competed in the Bathurst 1000 since the race moved to Bathurst in 1963 including three time Indianapolis 500 winner Johnny Rutherford, Janet Guthrie (the first woman to ever qualify for the Indy 500 in 1977), Dick Barbour, Sam Posey, Bob Tullius, John Andretti and Scott Pruett, Kendall holds the distinction of being the first one to have ever finished the race (Pruett in his only start would finish 11th the next year at Bathurst).

On June 30, 1991, Kendall suffered serious leg injuries at Watkins Glen when a mechanical failure caused his Intrepid RM-1 IMSA GTP car to leave the track and crash head-on into a tire wall. This occurred along the same area of track where J. D. McDuffie of NASCAR Winston Cup fame was killed only a month later, and both crashes led to the addition of a bus stop chicane on the backstretch. Kendall spoke of this incident during Episode 4, Season 2 of the Speed Channel series, Setup as a "crossroads in his racing career." He returned to racing close to a year later in June 1992. He also discussed his accident on Athlete 360, a sports medicine television show hosted by Mark Adickes.

== Broadcasting career ==
In the 2000s, Kendall became a television analyst for the Champ Car series. He is also the host of the Speed Test Drive promotional television series where he and another professional race car driver drive a new vehicle on a race course while being able to remotely talk to each other and offer their positive thoughts on the car.

In 2007 and 2008, Kendall was one of the hosts of the show Setup on SpeedTV.

On July 15, 2012, Kendall revealed on SpeedTV's WindTunnel program that he would be returning to the cockpit as one of four full-time drivers in a factory-backed Dodge Viper effort competing in the American Le Mans Series.

On September 22, 2013, Kendall's new show, Driven - A Race Without Boundaries, premiered on Fox Sports 1. It also stars Rhys Millen and is hosted by Tiff Needell.

== Personal life ==
Kendall was raised in the city of La Cañada Flintridge, California, near Los Angeles and is a 1984 graduate of La Cañada High School.

Kendall earned a degree in economics from UCLA and to this day maintains an avid interest in business.

== Hall of Fame ==
In 2015, Kendall was inducted in the Motorsports Hall of Fame of America.

In 2025, Kendall was inducted into the Trans-Am Series Hall of Fame.

== Motorsports career results ==
=== NASCAR ===
(key) (Bold - Pole position awarded by qualifying time. Italics - Pole position earned by points standings or practice time. * – Most laps led.)

==== Winston Cup Series ====
NASCAR Winston Cup Series results
Year	Team	No.	Make	1	2	3	4	5	6	7	8	9	10	11	12	13	14	15	16	17	18	19	20	21	22	23	24	25	26	27	28	29	30	31	32	33	NWCC	Pts	Ref
1987	Spears Motorsports	76	Buick	DAY	CAR	RCH	ATL	DAR	NWS	BRI	MAR	TAL	CLT	DOV	POC	RSD	MCH	DAY	POC	TAL	GLN	MCH	BRI	DAR	RCH	DOV	MAR	NWS	CLT	CAR	RSD; 38	ATL					107th	0	
1988	Spears Motorsports	76	Buick	DAY	RCH	CAR	ATL	DAR	BRI	NWS	MAR	TAL	CLT	DOV	RSD; 18	POC	MCH	DAY	POC	TAL	GLN	MCH	BRI	DAR	RCH	DOV	MAR	CLT	NWS	CAR	PHO	ATL					64th	114	
1989	Hendrick Motorsports	18	Chevy	DAY	CAR	ATL	RCH	DAR	BRI	NWS	MAR	TAL	CLT	DOV	SON	POC	MCH	DAY	POC	TAL	GLN; 27	MCH	BRI	DAR	RCH	DOV	MAR	CLT	NWS	CAR	PHO	ATL					NA	0	
1990	Reno Enterprises	40	Chevy	DAY	RCH	CAR	ATL	DAR	BRI	NWS	MAR	TAL	CLT	DOV	SON; 38	POC	MCH	DAY	POC	TAL	GLN; 8	MCH	BRI	DAR	RCH	DOV	MAR	NWS; DNQ	CLT; DNQ	CAR; 26	PHO	ATL					46th	281	
1991	Team SABCO	42	Pontiac	DAY	RCH	CAR	ATL	DAR	BRI	NWS	MAR	TAL	CLT	DOV	SON; 18	POC	MCH	DAY	POC	TAL	GLN	MCH	BRI	DAR	RCH	DOV	MAR	NWS	CLT	CAR	PHO	ATL					63rd	114	
1992	Jimmy Means Racing	52	Pontiac	DAY	CAR	RCH	ATL	DAR	BRI	NWS	MAR	TAL	CLT	DOV	SON; 13	POC	MCH	DAY	POC	TAL	GLN	MCH	BRI	DAR	RCH	DOV	MAR	NWS	CLT	CAR	PHO	ATL					66th	124	
1993	AK Racing	7	Ford	DAY	CAR	RCH	ATL	DAR	BRI	NWS	MAR	TAL	SON; 22	CLT	DOV	POC	MCH	DAY	NHA	POC	TAL	GLN; 25	MCH	BRI	DAR	RCH	DOV	MAR	NWS	CLT	CAR	PHO	ATL				54th	185	
1994	Junior Johnson & Associates	27	Ford	DAY	CAR	RCH	ATL	DAR	BRI	NWS	MAR	TAL	SON	CLT	DOV	POC	MCH	DAY	NHA	POC	TAL	IND	GLN; 22	MCH	BRI	DAR	RCH	DOV	MAR	NWS	CLT	CAR	PHO	ATL			63rd	97	
1996	Elliott-Hardy Racing	94	Ford	DAY	CAR	RCH	ATL	DAR	BRI	NWS	MAR	TAL	SON; 28	CLT	DOV	POC	MCH	DAY	NHA	POC	TAL	IND	GLN	MCH	BRI	DAR	RCH	DOV	MAR	NWS	CLT	CAR	PHO	ATL			60th	84	
1998	Team SABCO	46	Chevy	DAY	CAR	LVS	ATL	DAR	BRI	TEX	MAR	TAL	CAL	CLT	DOV	RCH	MCH	POC	SON; DNQ	NHA	POC	IND	GLN; 17	MCH	BRI	NHA	DAR	RCH	DOV	MAR	CLT	TAL	DAY	PHO	CAR	ATL	56th	232	
1998	LJ Racing	91	Chevy																SON; 16																		56th	232	

==== Busch Series ====
NASCAR Busch Series results
Year	Team	No.	Make	1	2	3	4	5	6	7	8	9	10	11	12	13	14	15	16	17	18	19	20	21	22	23	24	25	26	27	28	29	30	31	NBSC	Pts	Ref
1990	Reno Enterprises	40	Chevy	DAY	RCH	CAR	MAR	HCY	DAR	BRI	LAN	SBO	NZH	HCY	CLT	DOV	ROU	VOL	MYB	OXF	NHA	SBO	DUB	IRP	ROU	BRI	DAR	RCH	DOV	MAR	CLT	NHA; 15	CAR	MAR	85th	118	

=== 24 Hours of Le Mans results ===
Year	Team	Co-Drivers	Car	Class	Laps	Pos.	Class Pos.
2000	(Germany) Konrad Motorsport	(United States) Charles Slater (Germany) Jürgen von Gartzen	Porsche 911 GT2	GTS	317	14th	7th
2013	(United States) SRT Motorsports	(United States) Jonathan Bomarito (Canada) Kuno Wittmer	SRT Viper GTS-R	GTE; Pro	301	31st	9th

=== Bathurst 1000 result ===
Year	Team	Co-Drivers	Car	Class	Laps	Pos.	Class Pos.
1996	(Australia) Shell FAI Racing	(Australia) Steven Johnson	Ford EF Falcon		158	8th	8th
