= Paul Gentilozzi =

American racing driver

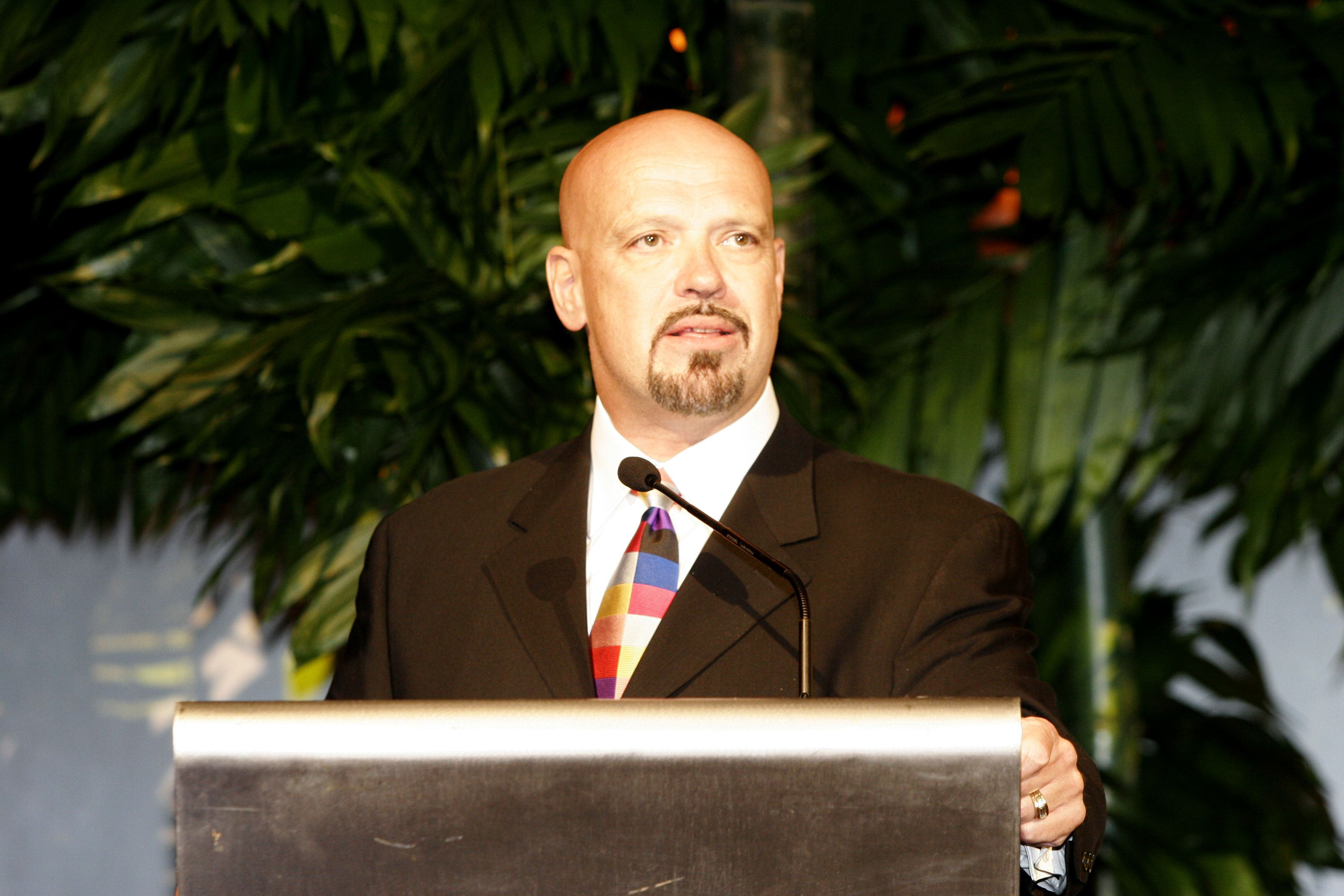
- Gentilozzi in 2005
- Born: February 6, 1950 (age 76); Lansing, Michigan, U.S.
- Occupations: Race car driver and businessman

Paul Gentilozzi (born February 6, 1950, in Lansing, Michigan) is a race car driver and businessman. His non-racing business interests are real estate development, principally developing office buildings for institutions and government agencies.

Prior to his involvement in motor racing, he received his Business Degree from Michigan State University. In 1985 he founded the successful Rocketsports Racing team that has competed in the Trans-Am series, Champ Car World Series, and The International Motorsports Association. As a driver he has won five drivers championships and nine manufacturers championships while holding the Trans Am record for wins, poles, top-three finishes and prize money won. With 31 Trans Am wins, the most in series history, eclipsing the record held by Mark Donohue and 11 IMSA wins. He has run a number of different manufacturers including Oldsmobile, Ferrari, Ford, Nissan, Chevrolet, and most recently Jaguar. Previous to this he was involved in NHRA Drag Racing, successfully driving many Plymouth and Dodge vehicles. In 2009, he formed RSR Racing with his sons Anthony and John Gentilozzi.

He teamed up with three other drivers to win the 1994 24 Hours of Daytona, his biggest win as a driver. He and Scott Pruett won the GTS class at the 2002 Daytona 24 hour event. He has fielded Champ Cars for rookie of the year Timo Glock, Alex Tagliani, Mario Dominguez, Antonio Pizzonia and 2004 Star Mazda series champion Michael McDowell, while running three Trans-Am cars for himself, Hollywood advertising executive/racer Tomy Drissi and that year's series champion Klaus Graf of Germany and Television star Craig T. Nelson.

Gentilozzi and fellow Champ Car owners Gerald Forsythe and Kevin Kalkhoven purchased the assets of Champ Car following a financially difficult 2003 season. Judge Frank Otte ruled in favor of the trio, known as Open Wheel Racing Series LLC, over rival bidder Tony George, the chairman/CEO of the Indianapolis Motor Speedway and the Indy Racing League. In 2008, the series was merged with the Indy Racing League.

== Awards ==
- Gentilozzi was inducted to the Trans-Am Series Hall of Fame in 2025.

== Motorsports career results ==
=== NASCAR ===
(key) (Bold – Pole position awarded by qualifying time. Italics – Pole position earned by points standings or practice time. * – Most laps led.)

==== Winston Cup Series ====
NASCAR Winston Cup Series results
| Year | Team | No. | Make | 1 | 2 | 3 | 4 | 5 | 6 | 7 | 8 | 9 | 10 | 11 | 12 | 13 | 14 | 15 | 16 | 17 | 18 | 19 | 20 | 21 | 22 | 23 | 24 | 25 | 26 | 27 | 28 | 29 | 30 | 31 | 32 | 33 | 34 | NWCC | Pts | Ref |
|---|---|---|---|---|---|---|---|---|---|---|---|---|---|---|---|---|---|---|---|---|---|---|---|---|---|---|---|---|---|---|---|---|---|---|---|---|---|---|---|---|
| 1999 | Roehrig Motorsports | 19 | Pontiac | DAY | CAR | LVS | ATL | DAR | TEX | BRI | MAR | TAL | CAL | RCH | CLT | DOV | MCH | POC | SON | DAY | NHA | POC | IND | GLN; DNQ | MCH | BRI | DAR | RCH | NHA | DOV | MAR | CLT | TAL | CAR | PHO | HOM | ATL | NA | - | |
