= Grand Prix of Toronto =

Annual car race in Canada

Ontario Honda Dealers Indy Toronto

NTT IndyCar Series
- Location: Toronto Street Circuit, Exhibition Place; Toronto, Ontario, Canada; 43°38′14″N 79°24′56″W
- Corporate sponsor: Ontario Honda Dealers
- First race: 1986
- First ICS race: 2009
- Last race: 2025
- Laps: 90
- Duration: 258.66 km (160.72 mi)
- Previous names: Molson Indy Toronto (1986–2005); Molson Grand Prix of Toronto (2006); Steelback Grand Prix of Toronto (2007); Honda Indy Toronto (2009–2023); Ontario Honda Dealers Indy Toronto (2024–2025)
- Most wins (driver): Michael Andretti (7)
- Most wins (team): Chip Ganassi Racing (8)
- Most wins (manufacturer): Chassis: Dallara (16); Engine: Chevrolet (14)

Circuit information
- Surface: Asphalt/Concrete
- Length: 2.874 km (1.786 mi)
- Turns: 11

The Ontario Honda Dealers Indy Toronto was an annual Indy car race, held in Toronto, Ontario, Canada. Originally known as the Molson Indy Toronto, it was part of the Championship Auto Racing Teams (CART) series from 1986 to 2003, and then the Champ Car World Series (CCWS) from 2004 to 2007. After a one-year hiatus, it was part of the IndyCar Series schedule from 2009 to the 2025 season, after which the race would shift over to Downtown Markham for the Grand Prix of Markham.

The race took place on a 2.874 km (1.786 mi), 11 turn, temporary street circuit through Exhibition Place and on Lake Shore Boulevard.

It was IndyCar's second-longest running street race, only behind the Grand Prix of Long Beach and the third oldest race on the schedule (tied with the Indy 200 at Mid-Ohio) in terms of number of races run. The Toronto Indy was one of eight Canadian circuits to have held an Indy car race, the others being Canadian Tire Motorsport Park, Mont-Tremblant, Sanair, Montreal, Vancouver, Edmonton, and Markham.

== Origins ==
Motorsport and automobile demonstrations has a history at Exhibition Place going back over 100 years. Automotive shows, displays, races and driving demonstrations have taken place on the grounds since the invention of the automobile, including the first appearance of an indy car, the 1916 Indianapolis 500 winning Peugeot during the 1918 Canadian National Exhibition.

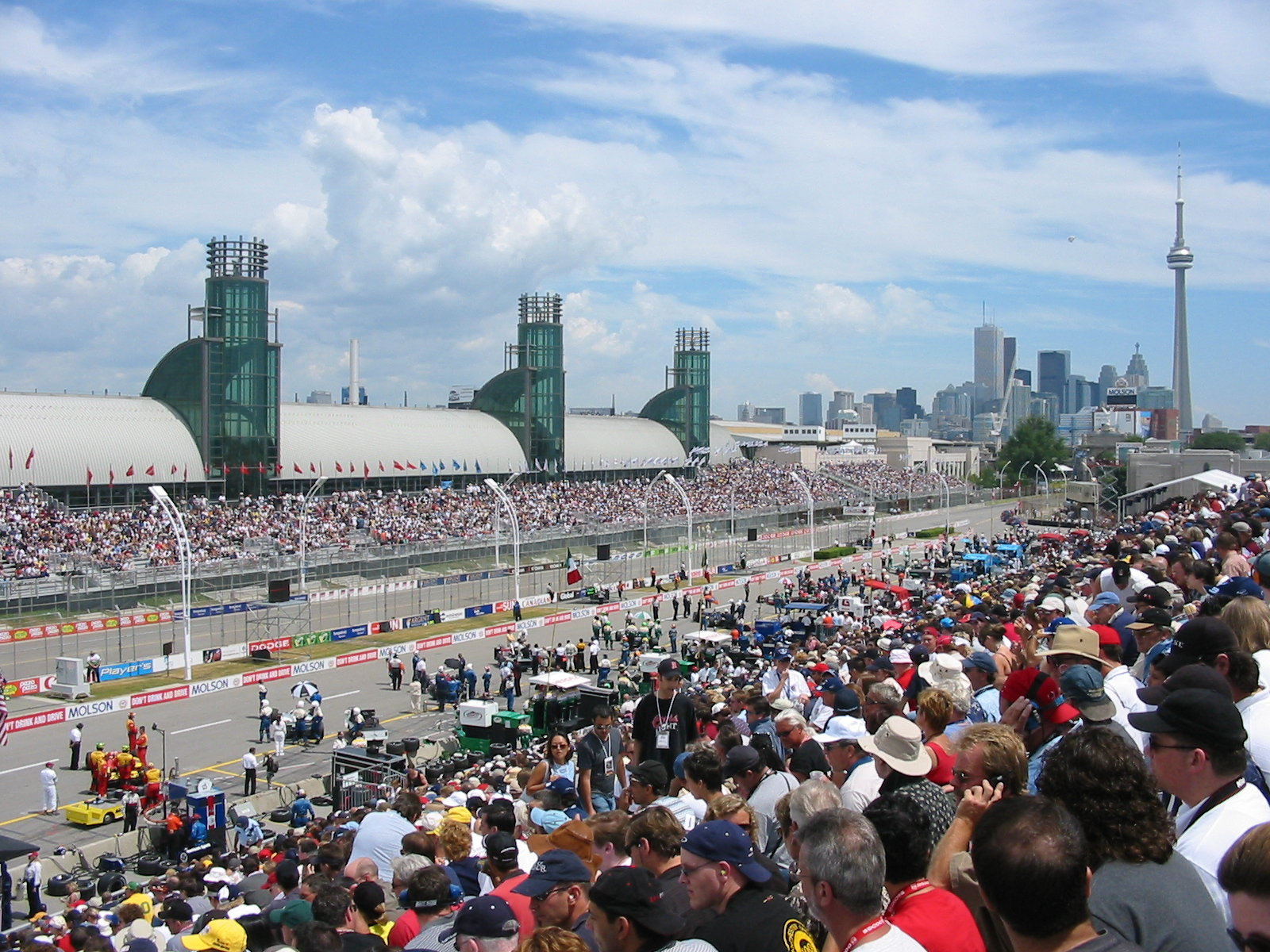
2003 Molson Indy pit lane and front straight.

From 1952 until 1966 the Exhibition Stadium grandstand hosted stock car racing on a paved quarter mile circuit on Friday nights and Sunday afternoons, hosting crowds upwards of 20,000 often broadcast live on CBC in Toronto. In 1958 the venue hosted a NASCAR Cup Series race, the Jim Mideon 500. The race was the first of Richard Petty's 1,184 starts in NASCAR and was won by his father Lee Petty.

Following the 1977 Formula One Canadian Grand Prix, Labatt, the sponsor who held the rights to F1 racing in Canada at the time, as well as the owners of Mosport Park revived the proposal to move the race to Exhibition Place after the FIA deemed Mosport as an unsuitable host facility going forward. Toronto city council turned down the proposal by a margin of two votes and within a few hours, Montreal mayor Jean Drapeau had negotiated with Labatt to move the race permanently to Montreal.

In 1984, Molson Breweries in-house promotional division, Molstar Sports & Entertainment acquired the rights to CART sanctioned IndyCar races in Canada and ran the first Molson Indy at the Sanair Speedway outside Montreal. The tight tri-oval was unpopular with the CART teams in part due to a severe injury to Rick Mears during the first event. In the spring of 1985, Molson revived the idea of a street circuit through Exhibition Place in Toronto for a third time. Toronto City Council approved the race by two votes in July 1985 for the race to be held the following year.

== Race history ==
The first Molson Indy Toronto was won by Bobby Rahal on July 20, 1986. The event quickly became Canada's second largest annual sporting event, eclipsed only by the Canadian Grand Prix in Montreal, with three-day attendance figures routinely around 170,000 people.

Time trials for the 2013 race.

In the 1996 race, American driver Jeff Krosnoff was killed in a crash with 4 laps remaining. In that same crash, volunteer corner marshal Gary Avrin was killed, and marshal Barbara Johnston also received injuries in the crash; she was treated and released that evening. Adrián Fernández won the race.

The name of the race was changed in 2006 from the Molson Indy Toronto to the Molson Grand Prix of Toronto after it was purchased by the Champ Car World Series from Molstar Sports and Entertainment. The name was also changed to distance Champ Car from the rival Indy Racing League (IRL), which had gained the exclusive right to use the "Indy" name after 2002. In 2007, after Molson dropped their title sponsorship to the race, Steelback Brewery signed a multi-year, multimillion-dollar deal to become the event's title sponsor, renaming it the Steelback Grand Prix of Toronto. This marked the first title sponsorship change since the event started in 1986.

The unification of Champ Car and the Indy Racing League was announced on February 22, 2008, and the Grand Prix of Toronto's future was left in doubt. After attempts were made to preserve the race for 2008, it was confirmed on March 5, 2008, that the race had been cancelled. On May 15, 2008, Andretti Green Racing (co-owned by Michael Andretti) purchased the assets of the former Grand Prix of Toronto. On July 30, 2008, it was confirmed that the race would return to Toronto on July 12, 2009. On September 18, 2008, Andretti Green Racing announced that it had signed a multi-year agreement with Honda Canada Inc. for the title sponsorship of the race, henceforth named from 2009 onward as the Honda Indy Toronto.

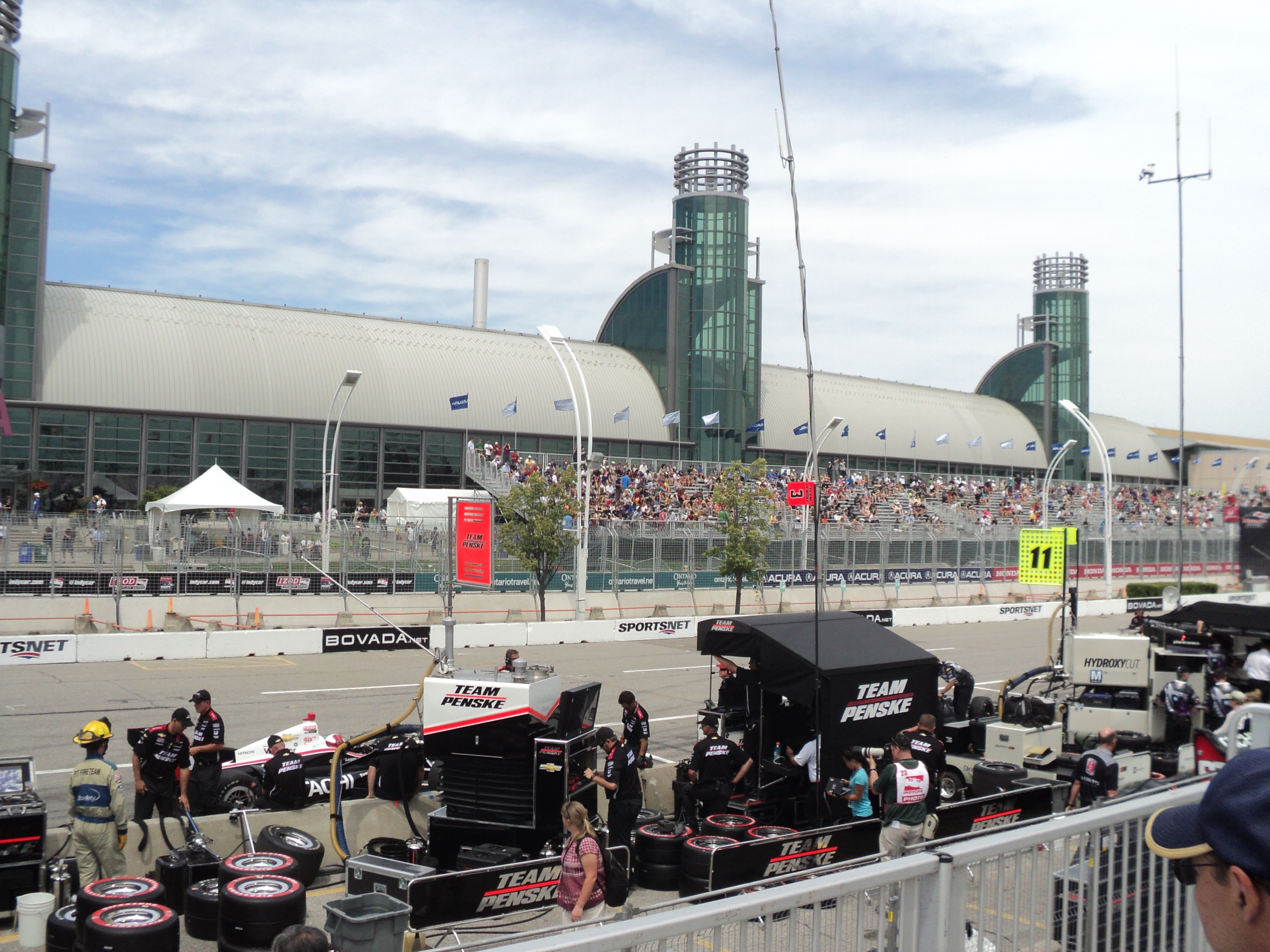
Looking towards the Direct Energy Centre during the 2013 race. Team Penske pits are at the bottom of the image.

In 2013, the race weekend was changed to a 2 race format with one race Saturday and one race Sunday. The Saturday race would feature a standing start while the Sunday race would be a rolling start. After an aborted standing start Saturday leading to a rolling start, teams and officials agreed to try the standing start again Sunday. The Sunday standing start was successful on its first attempt and was the first successful standing start in unified IndyCar series history (the Champ Car World Series had used standing starts late in its history shortly before unification). In 2014, weather forced both races to be run Sunday, exposing the difficulty in logistics of running two races in an already packed schedule. By 2015, both standing starts and the two race format were abandoned.

In 2016, the track layout was modified to accommodate the newly constructed Hotel X Toronto. Under the new layout, the pit lane was moved to the opposite side of the race course, starting at the outside of turn 9 and exiting just after turn 11. This, in turn, made turn 11 a sharper turn than it had been in the previous configuration.

Michael Andretti is the all-time race win leader with seven victories.

The 2020 and 2021 editions of the event were cancelled due to the COVID-19 pandemic in Ontario, marking the second gap in the race's history. This came due to the restrictions that were in place barring non-essential travel at the Canada–United States border (as most IndyCar Series races are within the United States) and after Mayor John Tory announced that all mass public gatherings were banned throughout the summers of 2020 and 2021 respectively in response to the pandemic.

Following the cancellation of the 2020 race, a new three-year agreement was reached in September 2020 between Exhibition Place and Green Savoree Toronto to host the event through 2023.

On March 14, 2024 it was announced that the new title partner of the race would be the Ontario Honda Dealers, changing the name to the Ontario Honda Dealers Indy Toronto.

In 2025, the race would return to being 90 laps and would be the shortest race on the IndyCar Series schedule, at 160.72 miles (258.65 km), even after the series lengthened races on the schedule.

In September 2025, it was announced that the event would be moved to the city of Markham, Ontario for the 2026 season as part of a 5-year deal.

=== Charities ===
During the tenure of Molson's original race ownership, the Molson Indy Festival Foundation hosted various fundraising events in the city in the week leading up to the race week. As of 2004 the foundation had donated $5.6 million towards community groups and charitable organizations.

In 2010 the race introduced the annual Fan Fridays to the race weekend. In lieu of paid admission, attendees are encouraged to make a contribution to the Make-A-Wish Foundation upon entering the grounds. The initiative has raised $820,000 as of 2019 for the organization dedicated to granting wishes for children with critical illnesses.

== Past winners ==
Season	Date	Driver	Team	Chassis	Engine	Race distance		Race time	Average speed (mph)	Report
Season	Date	Driver	Team	Chassis	Engine	Laps	Miles (km)	Race time	Average speed (mph)	Report
CART / Champ Car
1986	July 20	(United States) Bobby Rahal	Truesports	March	Cosworth	103	183.34 (295.057)	2:05:50	87.414	Report
1987	July 19	(Brazil) Emerson Fittipaldi	Patrick Racing	March	Chevrolet-Ilmor	103	183.34 (295.057)	1:54:35	95.991	Report
1988	July 17	(United States) Al Unser Jr.	Galles Racing	March	Chevrolet-Ilmor	103	183.34 (295.057)	1:59:34	91.994	Report
1989	July 23	(United States) Michael Andretti	Newman/Haas Racing	Lola	Chevrolet-Ilmor	103	183.34 (295.057)	2:01:00	90.9	Report
1990	July 22	(United States) Al Unser Jr. (2)	Galles/KRACO Racing (2)	Lola	Chevrolet-Ilmor	94*	167.32 (269.275)	2:13:26	75.997	Report
1991	July 21	(United States) Michael Andretti (2)	Newman/Haas Racing (2)	Lola	Chevrolet-Ilmor	103	183.34 (295.057)	1:50:57	99.143	Report
1992	July 19	(United States) Michael Andretti (3)	Newman/Haas Racing (3)	Lola	Ford-Cosworth	103	183.34 (295.057)	1:52:21	97.898	Report
1993	July 18	(Canada) Paul Tracy	Penske Racing	Penske	Chevrolet-Ilmor	103	183.34 (295.057)	1:53:58	96.51	Report
1994	July 17	(United States) Michael Andretti (4)	Chip Ganassi Racing	Reynard	Ford-Cosworth	98	174.44 (280.733)	1:48:15	96.673	Report
1995	July 16	(United States) Michael Andretti (5)	Newman/Haas Racing (4)	Lola	Ford-Cosworth	98	174.44 (280.733)	1:50:25	94.787	Report
1996	July 14	(Mexico) Adrian Fernandez	Tasman Motorsports	Lola	Honda	93*	165.912 (267.009)	1:41:59	97.548	Report
1997	July 20	(United Kingdom) Mark Blundell	PacWest Racing	Reynard	Mercedes-Benz	95	163.495 (263.119)	1:45:43	92.779	Report
1998	July 19	(Italy) Alex Zanardi	Chip Ganassi Racing (2)	Reynard	Honda	95	163.495 (263.119)	1:52:24	87.274	Report
1999	July 18	(United Kingdom) Dario Franchitti	Team Green	Reynard	Honda	95	166.725 (268.317)	1:56:27	85.897	Report
2000	July 16	(United States) Michael Andretti (6)	Newman/Haas Racing (5)	Lola	Ford-Cosworth	112	196.56 (316.332)	2:00:02	98.248	Report
2001	July 15	(United States) Michael Andretti (7)	Team Green (2)	Reynard	Honda	95	166.725 (268.317)	1:59:58	83.375	Report
2002	July 7	(Brazil) Cristiano da Matta	Newman/Haas Racing (6)	Lola	Toyota	112	196.56 (316.332)	2:06:19	93.361	Report
2003	July 13	(Canada) Paul Tracy (2)	Forsythe Racing	Lola	Ford-Cosworth	112	196.56 (316.332)	2:02:36	96.189	Report
2004	July 11	(France) Sébastien Bourdais	Newman/Haas Racing (7)	Lola	Ford-Cosworth	84	147.42 (237.249)	1:45:36	83.749	Report
2005	July 10	(United Kingdom) Justin Wilson	RuSPORT	Lola	Ford-Cosworth	86	150.93 (242.898)	1:46:10	85.296	Report
2006	July 9	(United States) A. J. Allmendinger	Forsythe Racing (2)	Lola	Ford-Cosworth	86	150.93 (242.898)	1:38:01	92.386	Report
2007	July 8	(Australia) Will Power	Walker Racing	Panoz	Cosworth	73	128.115 (206.181)	1:45:58	72.534	Report
2008	Race cancelled following reunification of Champ Car and IRL.									
IndyCar Series
2009	July 12	(United Kingdom) Dario Franchitti (2)	Chip Ganassi Racing (3)	Dallara	Honda	85	149.175 (240.073)	1:43:47	86.24	Report
2010	July 18	(Australia) Will Power (2)	Penske Racing (2)	Dallara	Honda	85	149.175 (240.073)	1:47:15	83.451	Report
2011	July 10	(United Kingdom) Dario Franchitti (3)	Chip Ganassi Racing (4)	Dallara	Honda	85	149.175 (240.073)	1:56:32	76.805	Report
2012	July 8	(United States) Ryan Hunter-Reay	Andretti Autosport	Dallara	Chevrolet	85	149.175 (240.073)	1:33:27	95.787	Report
2013	July 13	(New Zealand) Scott Dixon	Chip Ganassi Racing (5)	Dallara	Honda	85	149.175 (240.073)	1:41:17	88.37	Report
2013	July 14	(New Zealand) Scott Dixon (2)	Chip Ganassi Racing (6)	Dallara	Honda	85	149.175 (240.073)	1:35:02	94.177	Report
2014	July 20*	(France) Sébastien Bourdais (2)	KV Racing Technology	Dallara	Chevrolet	65*	114.075 (183.585)	1:15:44	90.37	Report
2014	July 20*	(United Kingdom) Mike Conway	Ed Carpenter Racing	Dallara	Chevrolet	56*	98.28 (158.166)	1:20:36	73.168	Report
2015	June 14	(United States) Josef Newgarden	CFH Racing	Dallara	Chevrolet	85	149.175 (240.073)	1:39:00	90.41	Report
2016	July 17	(Australia) Will Power (3)	Team Penske (3)	Dallara	Chevrolet	85	151.81 (244.314)	1:42:39	88.739	Report
2017	July 16	(United States) Josef Newgarden (2)	Team Penske (4)	Dallara	Chevrolet	85	151.81 (244.314)	1:35:05	95.79	Report
2018	July 15	(New Zealand) Scott Dixon (3)	Chip Ganassi Racing (7)	Dallara	Honda	85	151.81 (244.314)	1:37:00	93.898	Report
2019	July 14	(France) Simon Pagenaud	Team Penske (5)	Dallara	Chevrolet	85	151.81 (244.314)	1:30:16	100.9	Report
2020	July 12	Race cancelled due to the COVID-19 pandemic.								
2021	July 11	Race cancelled due to the COVID-19 pandemic.								
2022	July 17	(New Zealand) Scott Dixon (4)	Chip Ganassi Racing (8)	Dallara	Honda	85	151.81 (244.314)	1:38:45	92.234	Report
2023	July 16	(Denmark) Christian Lundgaard	Rahal Letterman Lanigan Racing	Dallara	Honda	85	151.81 (244.31)	1:41:55	89.361	Report
2024	July 21	(United States) Colton Herta	Andretti Global with Curb Agajanian (2)	Dallara	Honda	85	151.81 (244.31)	1:39:28	91.568	Report
2025	July 20	(Mexico) Pato O'Ward	Arrow McLaren	Dallara	Chevrolet	90	160.72 (258.65)	1:48:23	88.972	Report

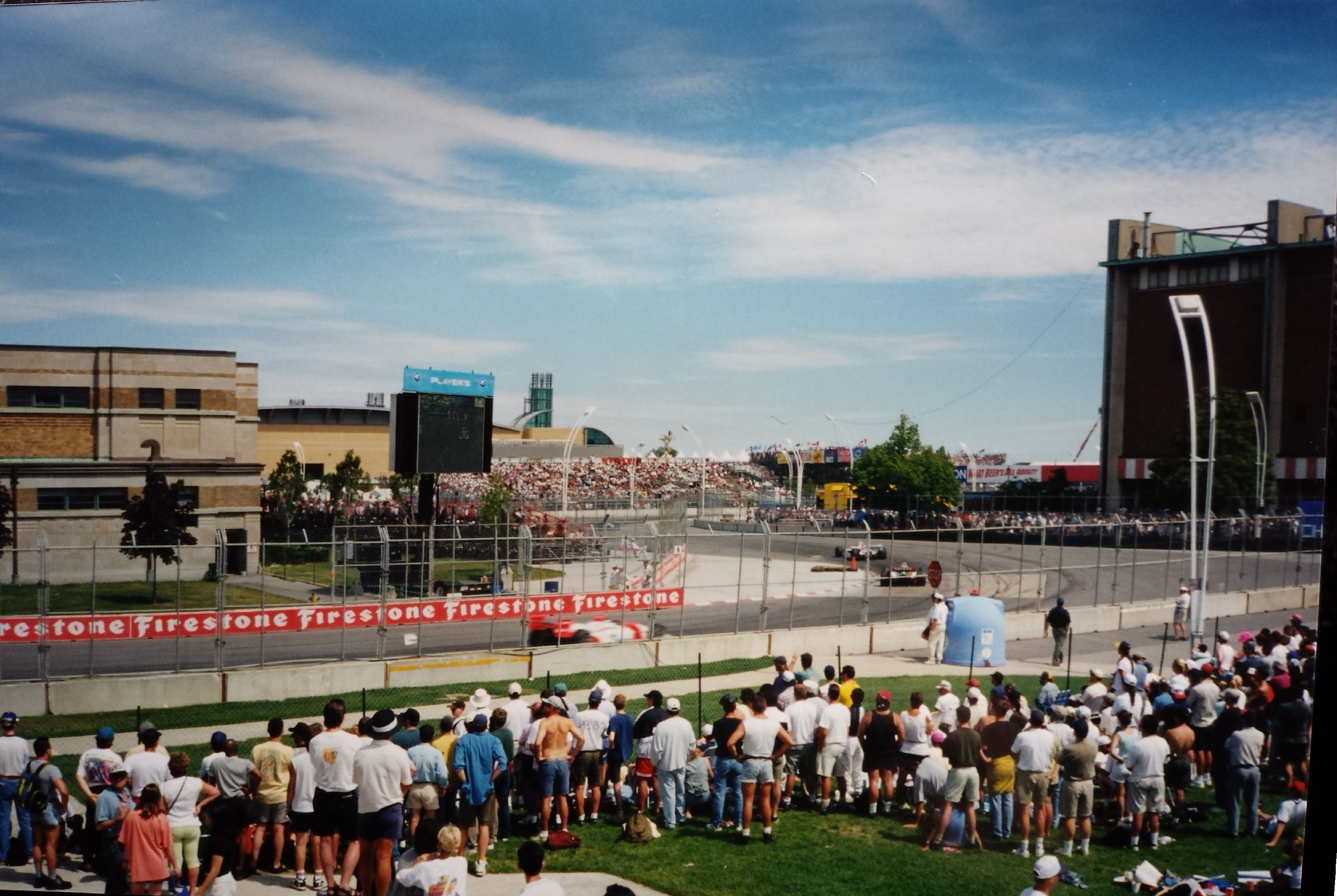
1997 Molson Indy Toronto

- 1990: Race shortened due to rain.
- 1996: Race shortened due to fatal crash involving Jeff Krosnoff and a track marshal.
- 2014 I: Race postponed from Saturday to Sunday morning due to rain. Shortened to accommodate regularly scheduled Sunday race.
- 2014 II: Race shortened due to time limit.

== Support race winners ==
=== Road to Indy ===
CART American Racing Series
Season	Date	Winning driver
1986	July 20	(Italy) Fabrizio Barbazza
1987	July 19	(Republic of Ireland) Tommy Byrne
1988	July 17	(United Kingdom) Calvin Fish
1989	July 23	(United States) Gary Rubio
1990	July 22	(Canada) Paul Tracy
CART Firestone/PPG/Dayton Indy Lights Series
1991	July 21	(United States) P. J. Jones
1992	July 19	(United States) Bryan Herta
1993	July 18	(United States) Bryan Herta
1994	July 17	(United Kingdom) Steve Robertson
1995	July 16	(Canada) Greg Moore
1996	July 14	(Brazil) Gualter Salles
1997	July 20	(Brazil) Hélio Castro-Neves
1998	July 19	(United Kingdom) Guy Smith
1999	July 18	(United States) Geoff Boss
2000	Not held	
2001	July 15	(United States) Townsend Bell
IndyCar Indy Lights
2002	Not held	
2003	Not held	
2004	Not held	
2005	Not held	
2006	Not held	
2007	Not held	
2008	Not held	
2009	July 11	(Colombia) Sebastián Saavedra
2010	July 18	(France) Jean-Karl Vernay
2011	July 10	(United Kingdom) Stefan Wilson
2012	July 7	(Colombia) Gustavo Yacamán
2013	July 13	(United Kingdom) Jack Hawksworth
2014	July 20	(France) Alexandre Baron
2015	June 13	(United States) Spencer Pigot
2015	June 14	(United States) Spencer Pigot
2016	July 16	(Sweden) Felix Rosenqvist
2016	July 17	(Sweden) Felix Rosenqvist
2017	July 15	(United States) Kyle Kaiser
2017	July 16	(United States) Kyle Kaiser
2018	July 14	(Mexico) Patricio O'Ward
2018	July 15	(Uruguay) Santiago Urrutia
2019	July 13	(United States) Aaron Telitz
2019	July 14	(United States) Oliver Askew
2020	Cancelled due to the COVID-19 pandemic.	
2021	Cancelled due to the COVID-19 pandemic.	
2022	Not held	
2023	Not held	
2024	Not held	

Star Mazda Championship
Season	Date	Winning driver
2007	July 7	(United States) Dane Cameron
2008	Not held	
2009	Not held	
2010	Not held	
2011	Not held	
2012	July 7	(United Kingdom) Jack Hawksworth
2012	July 8	(United Kingdom) Jack Hawksworth
Pro Mazda Championship
2013	July 13	(Australia) Matthew Brabham
2013	July 14	(Australia) Matthew Brabham
2014	Not held	
2015	June 13	(France) Florian Latorre
2015	June 14	(Canada) Garett Grist
2016	July 16	(United States) Aaron Telitz
2016	July 17	(United States) Aaron Telitz
2017	Not held	
2018	July 14	(Netherlands) Rinus VeeKay
2018	July 15	(Netherlands) Rinus VeeKay
Indy Pro 2000 Championship
2019	July 13	(Singapore) Danial Frost
2019	July 14	(United States) Kyle Kirkwood
2020	Cancelled due to the COVID-19 pandemic.	
2021	Cancelled due to the COVID-19 pandemic.	
2022	July 16	(United Kingdom) Louis Foster
2022	July 17	(United Kingdom) Louis Foster
USF Pro 2000 Championship
2023	July 15	(United States) Michael d'Orlando
2023	July 16	(United States) Myles Rowe
2024	July 20	(United States) Simon Sikes
2024	July 21	(Australia) Lochie Hughes

Formula Ford 2000 Championship
Season	Date	Winning driver
2006	July 8	(United States) J. R. Hildebrand
2006	July 9	(United States) J. R. Hildebrand
2007 to 2009, No series, not held
U.S. F2000 National Championship
2010	Not held	
2011	Not held	
2012	Not held	
2013	July 13	(United States) Neil Alberico
2013	July 14	(Brazil) Danilo Estrela
2014	July 20	(United States) Jake Eidson
2014	July 20	(France) Florian Latorre
2015	June 13	(United States) Jake Eidson
2015	June 14	(France) Nico Jamin
2016	July 16	(Brazil) Victor Franzoni
2016	July 17	(Canada) Parker Thompson
2017	July 15	(Canada) Parker Thompson
2017	July 16	(Canada) Parker Thompson
2018	July 14	(United States) Kyle Kirkwood
2018	July 15	(United States) Kyle Kirkwood
2019	July 13	(United States) Darren Keane
2019	July 14	(Denmark) Christian Rasmussen
2020	Moved to Road America - COVID-19 pandemic.	
2021	Cancelled due to COVID-19 Pandemic	
2022	July 16	(United States) Myles Rowe
2022	July 17	(United States) Jace Denmark
2023	July 15	(United States) Simon Sikes
2023	July 16	(Canada) Nico Christodoulou
2024	July 20	(United States) Sam Corry
2024	July 21	(United States) Evagoras Papasavvas

Atlantic Championship
Season	Winning driver
1990	(United States) Freddy Rhemrev
1991	(United States) Stuart Crow
1992	(Canada) David Empringham
1993	(Canada) Claude Bourbonnais
1994	(United States) Richie Hearn
1995	(United States) Richie Hearn
1996	(Canada) Patrick Carpentier
1997	(United States) Memo Gidley
1998	(Canada) Alex Tagliani
1999	Not held
2000	(Canada) Andrew Bordin
2001	(Canada) David Rutledge
2002	(Canada) Michael Valiante
2003	(United States) A. J. Allmendinger
2004	(United States) Jon Fogarty
2005	(Canada) Antoine Bessette
2006	(United States) Robbie Pecorari
2007	(France) Franck Perera

=== SCCA Trans-Am Series ===
Year	Winning driver	Car	Ref
1993	(United States) Scott Sharp	Chevrolet Camaro	
1994	(United States) Tommy Kendall	Ford Mustang	
2004	(Puerto Rico) Jorge Diaz, Jr.	Jaguar XKR	
2005	(United States) Paul Gentilozzi	Jaguar XKR	
2010	(Dominican Republic) R. J. Lopez	Chevrolet Corvette	

=== Pirelli World Challenge – GT ===
Season	Winning driver	Car
2007	(United States) Randy Pobst	Porsche 911 GT3
2010	(United States) Randy Pobst (GT) (United States) Peter Cunningham (GTS)	Volvo S60; Acura TSX
2013	(United States) Johnny O'Connell (GT) (United States) Lawson Aschenbach (GTS)	Cadillac CTS-V; Chevrolet Camaro
2014	Race 1	
2014	(United Kingdom) Nick Tandy (GT) (Brazil) Marcelo Hahn (GTA) (United States) Dean Martin (GTS)	Porsche 911 GT3 R Lamborghini Gallardo GT3; Ford Mustang Boss 302S
2014	Race 2	
2014	(Canada) Kuno Wittmer (GT) (United States) Michael Mills (GTA) (Canada) Mark Wilkins (GTS)	Dodge Viper SRT GT3-R; Porsche 911 GT3 R Kia Optima

=== Pirelli World Challenge – Touring Car ===
Season	Winning driver	Car
2007	(United States) Peter Cunningham	Acura
2010	(Canada) Nick Wittmer	Honda Civic Si
2013	Race 1	
2013	(United States) Michael Cooper (TC) (United States) Joel Lipperini (TCB)	Mazdaspeed 3 Honda Fit
2013	Race 2	
2013	(United States) Michael Cooper (TC) (United States) Ernie Francis Jr. (TCB)	Mazdaspeed 3 Mazda 2

=== CASCAR Super Series ===
Year	Race name	Winner	Car	Ref
1999	Miller Lite 100	(Canada) Robin Buck	Pontiac	
2000	Exide 99	(Canada) Kevin Dowler	Ford	
2001		(Canada) Robin Buck	Pontiac	
2002	CASCAR Toronto Indy, presented by NAPA	(Canada) Kevin Dowler	Ford	
2003	Avenue ACDelco 100	(Canada) Jeff Lapcevich	Chevrolet	
2004	CASCAR Toronto Indy 100	(Canada) Jeff Lapcevich	Chevrolet	
2005	ATTO 100	(Canada) Kerry Micks	Ford	

=== NASCAR Pinty's Series ===
The Indy Toronto circuit is based around Exhibition Place, but the heritage of NASCAR and Exhibition Place dates considerably earlier than the 2010 Canadian Tire Series round at Indy Toronto. In 1958, the 31st round of NASCAR's Grand National (now Cup Series) championship was held at the third Exhibition Stadium (located on the site of BMO Field). That race marked the Cup debut of Richard Petty.

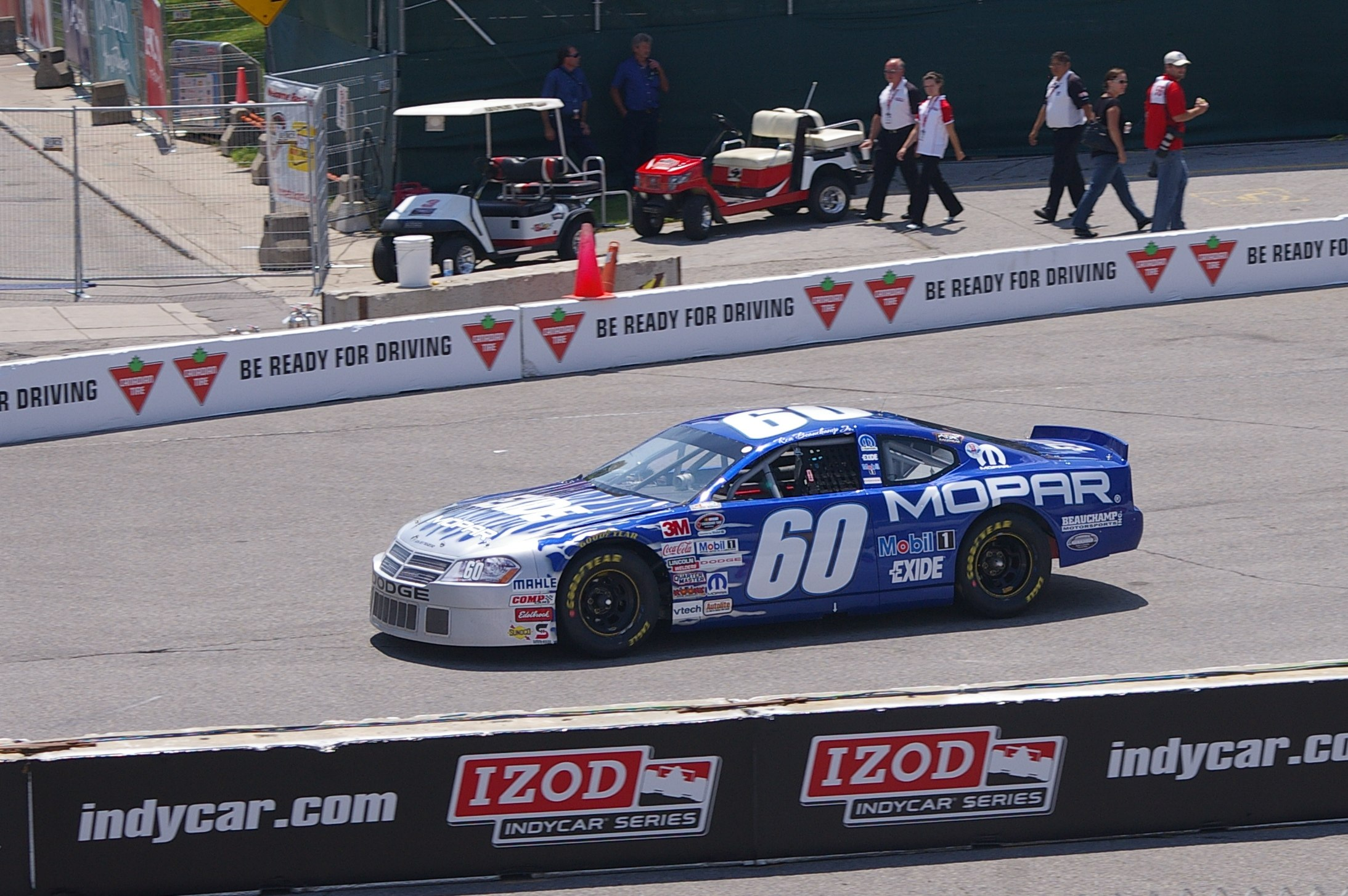
Ron Beauchamp, Jr. practicing for the 2010 Jumpstart 100

Year	Race name	Winner	Car	Ref
2010	Jumpstart 100	(Canada) Andrew Ranger	Dodge	
2011	Streets of Toronto 100	(Canada) Andrew Ranger	Dodge	
2016	Pinty's Grand Prix of Toronto	(Canada) Alex Tagliani	Chevrolet	
2017	Pinty's Grand Prix of Toronto	(Canada) Kevin Lacroix	Dodge	
2018	Pinty's Grand Prix of Toronto	(Canada) Andrew Ranger	Dodge	
2019	Pinty's Grand Prix of Toronto	(Canada) Alex Tagliani	Chevrolet	
2020	Cancelled due to the COVID-19 pandemic.			
2021	Cancelled due to the COVID-19 pandemic.			
2022	Grand Prix of Toronto	(Canada) Kevin Lacroix	Dodge	
2023	Tiffany Gate Grand Prix of Toronto	(Canada) Alex Tagliani	Chevrolet	

=== Stadium Super Trucks ===
Stadium Super Truck racing at Toronto in 2016

Year	Winner	Ref
2013	(United States) Justin Lofton	
2013	(United States) Sheldon Creed	
2014	(United States) Sheldon Creed	
2014	(United States) Sheldon Creed	
2015	(United States) Scotty Steele	
2015	(United States) Keegan Kincaid	
2016	(Australia) Matthew Brabham	
2016	(United States) Sheldon Creed	
2019	(United States) Cole Potts	
2019	(United States) Gavin Harlien	
2020	Cancelled due to the COVID-19 pandemic.	

== See also ==
- Molson Indy Montreal
- Molson Indy Vancouver
- Edmonton Indy
- Mont-Tremblant Champ Car Grand Prix
