= Brian Fowler =

Brian or Bryan Fowler may refer to:

- Brian Fowler (cyclist) (born 1962), New Zealand cyclist
- Brian Fowler (racing driver) (born 1971), Jamaican race car driver
- Brian Fowler (Emmerdale), fictitious television character
- Brian Fowler (MP) (fl. 1558) for Staffordshire (UK Parliament constituency)
- Bryan Fowler (1898–1987), British polo player
