= 2009 Trans-Am Series =

American sports car racing competition

Seasons
- ← 2005 2010 →

The 2009 Trans-Am Series was the 41st running of the Sports Car Club of America's Trans-Am Series. It was also the first official season since 2005. (Although the series held two races at Heartland Park Topeka in 2006, the races were considered after the fact to be exhibition events and no championship is officially counted.). Tomy Drissi won the series championship over the seven rounds contested.

== Results ==
Round	Circuit	Date	Winning driver	Winning vehicle	Reference
1	Road Atlanta	March 22	(United States) Greg Pickett	Jaguar XKR	
2	Virginia International Raceway	April 19	(Germany) Klaus Graf	Jaguar XKR	
3	Mosport International Raceway	May 17	(Germany) Klaus Graf	Jaguar XKR	
4	Mid-Ohio Sports Car Course	May 31	(Puerto Rico) Jorge Diaz Jr.	Jaguar XKR	
5	Portland International Raceway	June 14	(United States) Tomy Drissi	Jaguar XKR	
6	Watkins Glen International	July 12	(United States) Jim Goughary Jr.	Chevrolet Corvette	
7	Bluegrass Motorsports Park	Race canceled			
8	Road America	September 20	(United States) Cliff Ebben	Ford Mustang	

== Final points standings ==
Place	Driver	Points
1	(United States) Tomy Drissi	193
2	(United States) Tony Ave	154
3	(United States) Simon Gregg	138
4	(Trinidad and Tobago) Daniel Ramoutarsingh	123
5	(United States) Glen Jung	102
6	(United States) Jerry Kinn	101
7	(Puerto Rico) Jorge Diaz Jr.	84
8	(Puerto Rico) Edison Lluch Sr.	84
9	(United States) Jim Goughary Jr.	77
10	(United States) Amy Ruman	70
11	(Dominican Republic) R. J. Lopez	70
12	(Germany) Klaus Graf	68
13	(United States) Greg Pickett	60
14	(United States) Jon Leavy	58
15	(United States) Denny Lamers	52
16	(United States) Jordan Bupp	49
17	(United States) Cliff Ebben	45
18	(United States) Kenny Bupp Jr.	45
19	(United States) Mike Skeen	41
20	(United States) John Schaller	38
21	(Canada) Blaise Csida	34
22	(United States) Bob Monette	31
23	(United States) Todd Harris	30
24	(United States) Peter Mohrhauser	20
25	(United States) Nick Fluge	19
26	(United States) David Fershtand	19
27	(United States) Elmer Shannon	18
28	(United States) Robert Foster	16
29	(United States) Kyle Kelly	14
–	(United States) Ronald Tambouri Sr.	0
–	(United States) Carl Jensen	0
–	(United States) Terry Ward	0
–	(United States) Richard Grant	0
–	(United States) Bob Thumel	0
–	(United States) William Rozmajzl	0
–	(United States) Rob Holden	0
–	(United States) Jeff Emery	0
–	(United States) Kent Keller	0
–	(Puerto Rico) Edison Lluch Jr.	0
–	(United States) Jim Bradley	0
–	(United States) Ryan McManus	0
–	(United States) James Yozamp	0
–	(United States) Tim Brown	0
–	(United States) Jeff Holden	0
–	(United States) Kevin Malone	0
–	(United States) Buddy Cisar	0
