= 2013 Pirelli World Challenge =

Seasons
- ← 2012 2014 →

The 2013 Pirelli World Challenge season was the 24th season of the Sports Car Club of America's World Challenge Series.

== Schedule ==
The season schedule is as follows:

Rnd	Date	Circuit	Location	Classes	Supporting
1	March 23–24	Streets of St. Petersburg	St. Petersburg, Florida	GT, GTS (x2)	IndyCar Series
2	April 20–21	Streets of Long Beach	Long Beach, California	GT, GTS	IndyCar Series/American Le Mans Series
3	May 18–19	Circuit of the Americas	Austin, Texas	GT, GTS (x2); TC, TCB (x3)	V8 Supercars Series
4	June 1–2	The Raceway on Belle Isle	Detroit, Michigan	GT, GTS (x2)	IndyCar Series
5	July 5–6	Lime Rock Park	Lakeville, Connecticut	GT, GTS (x2); TC, TCB (x3)	American Le Mans Series
6	July 13–14	Streets of Toronto	Toronto, Ontario	GT, GTS; TC, TCB (x2)	IndyCar Series
7	August 3–4	Mid-Ohio Sports Car Course	Lexington, Ohio	GT, GTS (x2); TC, TCB (x2)	IndyCar Series
8	August 24–25	Sonoma Raceway (Indy course)	Sonoma, California	GT, GTS; TC, TCB (x2)	IndyCar Series
9	October 4–5	Grand Prix of Houston	Houston, Texas	GT, GTS; TC, TCB (x2)	IndyCar Series

== Race results ==
Rnd	Circuit	GT Winning Car	GTS Winning Car	TC Winning Car	TCB Winning Car
Rnd	Circuit	GT Winning Driver	GTS Winning Driver	TC Winning Driver	TCB Winning Driver
1	St. Petersburg	#9 Volvo S60	#73 Porsche Cayman S	Did not participate	Did not participate
1	St. Petersburg	(United States) Alex Figge	(United States) Jack Baldwin	Did not participate	Did not participate
1	St. Petersburg	#14 Audi R8 LMS	#73 Porsche Cayman S	Did not participate	Did not participate
1	St. Petersburg	(United States) James Sofronas	(United States) Jack Baldwin	Did not participate	Did not participate
2	Long Beach	#14 Audi R8 LMS	#10 Chevrolet Camaro	Did not participate	Did not participate
2	Long Beach	(United States) James Sofronas	(United States) Lawson Aschenbach	Did not participate	Did not participate
3	Austin	Did not participate	Did not participate	#72 Honda Civic Si	#98 Mazda 2
3	Austin	Did not participate	Did not participate	(United States) Ryan Winchester	(United States) Ernie Francis Jr.
3	Austin	#3 Cadillac CTS-V	#10 Chevrolet Camaro	#72 Honda Civic Si	#98 Mazda 2
3	Austin	(United States) Johnny O'Connell	(United States) Lawson Aschenbach	(United States) Ryan Winchester	(United States) Ernie Francis Jr.
3	Austin	#14 Audi R8 LMS	#20 Chevrolet Camaro	#70 Honda Civic Si	#98 Mazda 2
3	Austin	(United States) James Sofronas	(United States) Andy Lee	(United States) Brett Sandberg	(United States) Ernie Francis Jr.
4	Belle Isle	#3 Cadillac CTS-V	#38 Kia Optima	Did not participate	Did not participate
4	Belle Isle	(United States) Johnny O'Connell	(Canada) Mark Wilkins	Did not participate	Did not participate
4	Belle Isle	#6 Volvo S60	#50 Ford Mustang Boss 302S	Did not participate	Did not participate
4	Belle Isle	(United States) Randy Pobst	(United States) Dean Martin	Did not participate	Did not participate
5	Lime Rock	Did not participate	Did not participate	#70 Honda Civic Si	#37 Mini Cooper
5	Lime Rock	Did not participate	Did not participate	(United States) Brett Sandberg	(United States) Robbie Davis
5	Lime Rock	#2 Chevrolet Corvette Z06	#10 Chevrolet Camaro	#70 Honda Civic Si	#37 Mini Cooper
5	Lime Rock	(United States) Mike Skeen	(United States) Lawson Aschenbach	(United States) Brett Sandberg	(United States) Robbie Davis
5	Lime Rock	#3 Cadillac CTS-V	#73 Porsche Cayman S	#72 Honda Civic Si	#81 Honda Fit
5	Lime Rock	(United States) Johnny O'Connell	(United States) Jack Baldwin	(United States) Ryan Winchester	(United States) Joel Lipperini
6	Toronto	Did not participate	Did not participate	#1 Mazdaspeed 3	#81 Honda Fit
6	Toronto	Did not participate	Did not participate	(United States) Michael Cooper	(United States) Joel Lipperini
6	Toronto	#3 Cadillac CTS-V	#10 Chevrolet Camaro	#1 Mazdaspeed 3	#98 Mazda 2
6	Toronto	(United States) Johnny O'Connell	(United States) Lawson Aschenbach	(United States) Michael Cooper	(United States) Ernie Francis Jr.
7	Mid-Ohio	#9 Volvo S60	#38 Kia Optima	#1 Mazdaspeed 3	#98 Mazda 2
7	Mid-Ohio	(United States) Alex Figge	(Canada) Mark Wilkins	(United States) Michael Cooper	(United States) Ernie Francis Jr.
7	Mid-Ohio	#9 Volvo S60	#10 Chevrolet Camaro	#1 Mazdaspeed 3	#37 Mini Cooper
7	Mid-Ohio	(United States) Alex Figge	(United States) Lawson Aschenbach	(United States) Michael Cooper	(United States) Robbie Davis
8	Sonoma	Did not participate	Did not participate	#72 Honda Civic Si	#98 Mazda 2
8	Sonoma	Did not participate	Did not participate	(United States) Ryan Winchester	(United States) Ernie Francis Jr.
8	Sonoma	#8 Cadillac CTS-V	#27 Aston Martin Vantage GT4	#72 Honda Civic Si	#98 Mazda 2
8	Sonoma	(United Kingdom) Andy Pilgrim	(United States) Brandon Davis	(United States) Ryan Winchester	(United States) Ernie Francis Jr.
9	Houston	Did not participate	Did not participate	#70 Honda Civic Si	#24 Mini Cooper
9	Houston	Did not participate	Did not participate	(United States) Brett Sandberg	(United States) Tyler Palmer
9	Houston	#3 Cadillac CTS-V	#10 Chevrolet Camaro	#72 Honda Civic Si	#24 Mini Cooper
9	Houston	(United States) Johnny O'Connell	(United States) Lawson Aschenbach	(United States) Ryan Winchester	(United States) Tyler Palmer

== Championships ==
=== Drivers' Championships ===
Championship points are awarded to drivers based on qualifying and finishing positions. The Pole position winner receives 7 points. In addition, 1 bonus point is awarded to a driver leading a lap during a race, and 3 bonus points are awarded to the driver leading the most laps. The driver who sets the fastest lap of the race receives 1 bonus point.

Position	1	2	3	4	5	6	7	8	9	10	11	12	13	14	15	16	17	18	19	20	21	22	23	24	25	26	27	28	29	30	31	32	33	34	35	36	37	38	39	40
Race	140	110	95	85	80	76	72	68	64	60	57	54	51	48	45	43	41	39	37	35	33	31	29	27	25	23	21	19	17	15	13	11	9	7	6	5	4	3	2	1

==== GT ====
Pos	Driver	Car	STP		LBH	AUS		DET		LRP		TOR	MOH		SON	HOU	Points
1	(United States) Johnny O'Connell	Cadillac CTS-V	3	3	8	1	17	1	2	3	1	1	2	11	12	1	1481
2	(United States) James Sofronas	Audi R8 LMS	2	1	1	2	1	4	3	6	4	4	3	3	3	5	1444
3	(United Kingdom) Andy Pilgrim	Cadillac CTS-V	4	5	2	3	2	3	8	2	2	2	5	4	1	3	1379
4	(United States) Randy Pobst	Volvo S60	5	2	13	4	3	2	1	5	3	5	4	2	4	2	1321
5	(United States) Alex Figge	Volvo S60	1	13	10	8	8	9	6	9	11	8	1	1	10	6	1177
6	(United States) Mike Skeen	Chevrolet Corvette Z06	6	4	3	6	4			1	12	3	6	5	11		1035
6	(United States) Mike Skeen	Nissan GTR						8	9								1035
7	(United States) Duncan Ende	Audi R8 LMS	13	7	4	7	5	7	4	4	8	6	12	6	2		967
8	(United States) Tim Pappas	Mercedes-Benz SLS AMG GT3	9	8	6	5	10	5	5	7	6	DNS					656
9	(United States) Alex Welch	Audi R8 LMS	7	9	12	9	6			10	7		8	7			602
10	(United States) Tomy Drissi	Chevrolet Corvette Z06	8	10	DNS												378
10	(United States) Tomy Drissi	Porsche 911 GT3				12	14	6	7								378
11	(United States) Jeff Courtney	Audi R8 LMS	12	11	DNS	10	7						10	8			371
12	(United States) Tim Bell	Nissan GTR	10	14	11	14	16			12	10	DNS					370
13	(United States) Bill Ziegler	Audi R8 LMS								11	9		11	10	8		306
14	(United States) Bret Curtis	Audi R8 LMS	14	12	5	16	9										289
15	(Canada) Fred Roberts	Dodge Viper										7	9	9	9		264
16	(United States) Peter LeSaffre	Mercedes-Benz SLS AMG GT3	11	16		11	11										214
17	(United Kingdom) Oliver Bryant	Mercedes-Benz SLS AMG GT3								8	5						148
18	(United States) Jordan Taylor	Cadillac CTS-V											7	12			126
19	(United States) Craig Stanton	Porsche 911 GT3			9	17	DNS										105
20	(United States) Robert Prilika	Porsche 911 GT3				13	13										102
21	(United States) David Donner (R)	Porsche 911 GT3				18	12										93
22	(United States) Mike Hedlund	Audi R8 LMS				15	15										90
23	(United States) Brandon Davis	Porsche 911 GT3	15	15													90
24	(Germany) René Rast	Audi R8 LMS														4	85
25	(United States) Elton Julian	Audi R8 LMS Ultra													5		80
26	(United Kingdom) Ryan Dalziel	Porsche 911 GT3	DSQ	6													76
27	(United States) Kevin Buckler	Aston Martin Vantage GT3													6		76
28	(United States) Brent Holden	Porsche 911 GT3			7	DNS	DNS										72
29	(United States) Jason Daskalos	Dodge Viper													7		72
30	(United States) Michael Cooper	Nissan GTR											13				51
31	(United States) Bryan Heitkotter	Nissan GTR													13		51
32	(United States) David Roberts	Nissan GTR												13			51
	(United States) Kyle Kelley	Dodge Viper			DNS												0
Pos	Driver	Car	STP		LBH	AUS		DET		LRP		TOR	MOH		SON	HOU	Points

Color	Result
Gold	Winner
Silver	2nd place
Bronze	3rd place
Green	4th & 5th place
Light Blue	6th–10th place
Dark Blue	Finished (Outside Top 10)
Purple	Did not finish
Red	Did not qualify (DNQ)
Brown	Withdrawn (Wth)
Black	Disqualified (DSQ)
White	Did not start (DNS)
Blank	Did not participate

==== GTS ====
Pos	Driver	Car	STP		LBH	AUS		DET		LRP		TOR	MOH		SON	HOU	Points
1	(United States) Lawson Aschenbach	Chevrolet Camaro	5	2	1	1†	9†	3	8	1	2	1	3	1	3	1	1395
2	(United States) Jack Baldwin	Porsche Cayman S	1	1	3	3	3	2	5	3	1	3	4	3	23	4	1383
3	(Canada) Mark Wilkins	Kia Optima	6	6	5	5	2	1	2	4	3	4	1	4	6	3	1346
4	(United States) Andy Lee	Chevrolet Camaro	2	21	21	2	1†	5	23	2	4	2	5	5	2	5	1188
5	(United States) Peter Cunningham	Acura TSX	3	3	2	8	4	22	4	5	13	DNS	2	2	22	2	1063
6	(United States) Alec Udell	Ford Mustang	7	8		6	5	6	3	9	8	13	6	7	4	6	1036
7	(United States) Tony Gaples	Chevrolet Camaro	9	10	11	10	8	14	21	8	10	7	13	12	5	10	835
8	(United States) Nick Esayian	Acura TSX	10	7	8	12	10	9	16	21	9	8	7	6	21†	9	791
9	(United States) Brad Adams	Ford Mustang	21	19	10	9	11	12	7	18	17	6	10	10	17	8	762
10	(Sweden) Nic Jönsson	Kia Optima	8	5	7	4	22†	24	DNS	12	5	11	15	24	20	12	686
11	(United States) Ardee Toppe	Ford Mustang	14	12	24	24	25	19	11	15	15	9	20	21	12	17	592
12	(United States) Jim Taggart (R)	Lotus Exige S	13	9	15	15†	17	18	6	20	21		25	26		7	549
13	(El Salvador) Roger Rodas	Ford Mustang			16	16	18	15	9			5	14	15	8	13	526
14	(United States) Buz McCall	Porsche Cayman S	DNS	DNS	18	22	20	17	14	17	11	10	26	18	15	16	502
15	(United States) Ric Bushey	Nissan 370Z	19	16	23	20	14	10	20	22	23	DNS	22	DNS	7	18	489
16	(United States) Erik Davis	Ford Mustang			17	17	13	11	22			12	12	19	9		430
17	(United States) Harry Curtin	Chevrolet Camaro	15	15	12	23	12	8	19	14	22						411
18	(United States) Mitch Landry (R)	Ford Mustang	12	14						13	12		11	14	13	15	408
19	(United States) Brian Kleeman	Nissan 370Z	20	11				20	24	24	18		23	22	16	11	380
20	(United States) Drew Regitz (R)	BMW M3	17	22						16	14						351
20	(United States) Drew Regitz (R)	Aston Martin Vantage GT4											9	9	10		351
21	(United States) Robert Stout	Scion FR-S	DNS	23	19	25	26			11	24		DNS	23	14†	19	292
22	(United States) Dane Moxlow	Ford Mustang	22	DNS	13	13	7†	7	15								282
23	(United States) Lou Gigliotti	Chevrolet Camaro	11	17†	20	7	6										261
24	(United States) Mark Klenin	BMW M3	DNS	DNS	22					23	19						250
24	(United States) Mark Klenin	Aston Martin Vantage GT4											18	11	11		250
25	(United States) Bill Ziegler	Pontiac Solstice GXP	16	13	14	26	23	DNS	13								245
26	(United States) Lucas Catania (R)	Porsche Cayman S				11	15						8	8			238
27	(United States) Brandon Davis	Aston Martin Vantage GT4			4										1		230
28	(United States) Dean Martin	Ford Mustang						4	1								226
29	(United States) Kevin Gleason	Porsche Cayman S	4†	4	9												214
30	(United States) Don Istook	Audi TT RS								19	25		16	20		14	188
31	(United States) Todd Napieralski	Chevrolet Camaro				19	21	16	10								173
32	(United States) Roger Miller	Ford Mustang				18	16†	13	12								167
33	(United States) Craig Capaldi (R)	Ford Mustang						21	17				21	13			158
34	(United States) Joseph Catania (R)	Porsche Cayman S				21	19						17	16			154
35	(United States) Steven Goldman (R)	Porsche Cayman S				DNS	DNS			6	6						152
36	(United States) Richard Golinello	Ford Mustang	18	18				23	18								146
37	(United States) Ben Keating	Aston Martin Vantage GT4								10	7						132
38	(United States) Tom Long	Lotus Exige S								7	20						107
39	(Spain) Lucas Ordóñez	Nissan 370Z											24	25	18		91
40	(United States) Steve Doherty	Nissan 370Z											19	17	DNS		78
41	(Republic of Ireland) Damien Faulkner	Aston Martin Vantage GT4			6												76
42	(United States) Scott Bove	BMW M3				14	24										75
43	(United States) Ernie Francis Jr. (R)	Chevrolet Camaro	23	20													64
44	(United States) Bradford Sofronas	BMW M3								DNS	16						43
45	(United States) Darrell Anderson (R)	Ford Mustang													19		37
Pos	Driver	Car	STP		LBH	AUS		DET		LRP		TOR	MOH		SON	HOU	Points

Notes

- † Indicates driver received points penalty for rules or driving infraction.

==== TC ====
Pos	Driver	Car	AUS			LRP			TOR		MOH		SON		HOU		Points
1	(United States) Ryan Winchester	Honda Civic Si	1	1	2	2	2	1	2	3	5	2	1	1	2	1	1710
2	(United States) Brett Sandberg	Honda Civic Si	4	2	1	1	1	5	10	DNS	3	4	2	2	1	8	1365
3	(Canada) Remo Ruscitti (R)	Honda Civic Si	2	3	3	11	3	2	9	5	4	5	3	3	8	2	1242
4	(United States) Jon Miller	Honda Civic Si	5	5	4	6	4	4	5	4	6	9	6	6			948
5	(United States) Michael Cooper	Mazdaspeed 3				13	DNS	10	1	1	1	1	9	DNS	3	7	945
6	(United States) Fred Emich	Volkswagen GLI	7	10	15	7	8	12			8	7	4	4	6	4	842
7	(United States) Sarah Cattaneo	Honda Civic Si	6	6	6						9	8	5	5			520
8	(United States) Tristan Herbert	Volkswagen GLI	8	8	7						2	3					416
9	(United States) Clark Toppe (R)	Kia Forte Koup				3	9	3					7	7			398
10	(United States) Cody Ellsworth (R)	Porsche Boxter				4	6	7									241
11	(Canada) Patrick Seguin	Honda Civic Si	9	7	5												216
12	(United States) Robb Holland	Volkswagen GLI				8	7	6									216
13	(United States) Ray Mason	Honda Civic Si									7	6			9	DNS	212
14	(United States) Brad Adams	Mazda MX-5											10	DNS	7	6	208
15	(Canada) Tom Kwok	Honda Civic Si							3	2							207
16	(United States) Randy Hale	Mazda MX-5				10	5	11									197
17	(United States) Michael Pettiford	Volkswagen GLI	10	9	8												192
18	(United States) Bryce Miller	Volkswagen GLI				5	11	13									188
19	(Canada) Michael DiMeo (R)	Honda Civic Si													4	3	180
20	(United States) Thomas Martin (R)	Volkswagen GTI	11	11	9												178
21	(United States) Pete McIntosh (R)	BMW 128i				9	10	8									172
22	(United States) Charlie Solomon	Mazda RX-8	12	12	10												168
23	(United States) Sebastian Landy (R)	Mazda MX-5													5	5	160
24	(United States) Dinah Weisberg (R)	Porsche Boxter	13	13	11												159
25	(United States) Colin Cohen	Volkswagen GTI	14	14	12												150
26	(Canada) Alain Lauziere (R)	Mini Cooper S JCW							6	7							148
27	(Canada) Damon Sharpe	Honda Civic Si							7	6							148
28	(United States) Tom Lepper	Honda Civic Si											8	8			136
29	(Canada) Gary Kwok	Honda Civic Si							4	9							129
30	(Canada) Jonathan Young	Honda Civic Si							8	10							128
31	(Bermuda) Russell Smith	Kia Forte Koup									10	10					120
32	(United States) Josh Hurley	Mazda MX-5				14	DNS	9									112
33	(United States) Conner Ford	Volkswagen GLI	15	DNS	13												96
34	(United States) Nick Esayian	Honda Civic Si							DNS	8							68
35	(United States) Branden Peterson	Honda Civic Si										11					57
36	(United States) Bob Roth	Honda Civic Si									11						57
37	(United States) Jeff Ricca (R)	Hyundai Genesis Coupe				12	DNS	DNS									54
38	(Sweden) Nic Jönsson	Kia Forte Koup									12	DNS					54
39	(United States) Patrick Gallagher	Mazda MX-5									13	DNS					51
40	(United States) Dan Martinson (R)	Pontiac Solstice GXP	3†	4†	14												48
	(United States) Ken Dobson	Fiat 500 Abarth											DNS	DNS			0
Pos	Driver	Car	AUS			LRP			TOR		MOH		SON		HOU		Points

Notes

- † Indicates driver received points penalty for rules or driving infraction.

==== TCB ====
Pos	Driver	Car	AUS			LRP			TOR		MOH		SON		HOU		Points
1	(United States) Robbie Davis	Mini Cooper	5	3	3	1	1	8	5	2	7	1	2	4	8	7	1382
2	(United States) Joel Lipperini	Honda Fit	6	4	4	18	5	1	1	3	3	4	4	3	2	2	1352
3	(United States) Ernie Francis Jr.	Mazda 2	1	1	1	16	DNS	2	2	1	1	18	1	1†	20	8	1345
4	(United States) Tyler Palmer	Mini Cooper	13	17	12	3	2	3			4	2	3	2	1	1	1132
5	(United States) Ernie Francis	Mazda 2	3	18	5	8	6	9	3	4	2	6	5	5	3		1043
6	(Canada) P.J. Groenke	Honda Fit	9	7	8	7	9	6	7	5	11	12	DSQ	DSQ	4	3	859
7	(United States) Shea Holbrook	Honda Fit	10	10	17	5	4	10	6	8	9	5	DSQ	DSQ	6	6	826
8	(Argentina) David Alejandro	Mazda 2	14	6	11	14	18	14	4	6†	15	16	6	6	19	DNS	754
9	(Panama) Fernando Seferlis	Mazda 2	16	13	14	10	11	19	10	10	19	13	14	13	13	12	708
10	(United States) Chris Capaldi	Ford Fiesta	18	14	15	13	15	15	8	7	13	7	11	9	18	DNS	696
11	(United States) Jonathan Baker	Honda Fit	12	8	7	15	12				6	10			5	5	589
12	(Australia) Jim Cleveland	Fiat 500	20	DNS	DNS	11	17	16	9	11	18	20	15	16	9	10	583
13	(United States) Jack Murray	Fiat 500	19	DNS	DNS	12	16	17	11	9	16	17	13	14	14	15	573
14	(United States) Charlie James	Mini Cooper	2	2	2	2	3	18									569
15	(Denmark) Johan Schwartz	Mini Cooper	4	9	9†	19	DNS	5			DNS	DNS	7		7	4	535
16	(United States) Dave Rosenblum	Ford Fiesta				4	7	4			10	3					397
17	(United States) Mike Asselta	Mini Cooper	7	5	6	17	13	11									377
18	(United States) Brian Fowler	Ford Fiesta							12	12	20	19	17	DNS	12	11	332
19	(United States) Peter Schwartzott Sr.	Chevrolet Sonic				9	10	13			5	11					312
20	(United States) Peter Schwartzott	Chevrolet Sonic				20	14	12			14	14					233
21	(United States) Steve Taake	Mazda 2	17	16	13										17	14	224
22	(Bermuda) Russell Smith	Kia Rio				6	8	7									216
23	(Canada) Andrei Kisel	Mini Cooper											12	11	10	DNS	171
24	(United States) Brianne Corn	Mazda 2	15	12	10												159
25	(United States) Braden Miller	Ford Fiesta	8	15	16												156
26	(United States) Harry Cheung	Honda Fit											10	7			132
27	(United States) Sage Marie	Honda Fit											9	8			132
28	(Canada) Chase Pelletier	Honda Fit									8			10			128
29	(United States) Ed Magner	Mini Cooper	DNS	DNS	DNS						12	8					122
30	(United States) Kyle Keenan	Kia Rio											8	12			122
31	(United States) Chris Sneed	Mini Cooper													11	9	121
32	(Canada) Charles Paquin	Mazda 2													15	13	96
33	(United States) Michael Ashby	Mazda 2											16	15			88
34	(United States) J.G. Pasterjak	Ford Fiesta									17	15					86
35	(United States) James Wilson	Mazda 2													16	16	86
36	(United States) Chip Howell	Mini Cooper	11	11†	DNS												76
37	(United States) Jon Krolewicz	Honda Fit										9					64
Pos	Driver	Car	AUS			LRP			TOR		MOH		SON		HOU		Points

Notes

- † Indicates driver received points penalty for rules or driving infraction.

=== Manufacturer championships ===
Manufacturer points are awarded according to the highest-finishing car from that manufacturer. Only manufacturers that are SCCA Pro Racing corporate members receive points. Points are awarded on the following basis:

Position	1	2	3	4	5	6
Points	9	7	5	3	2	1

In addition, one bonus point is awarded to the pole-winning manufacturer. In the table below, the manufacturer's top finishing position is shown, with pole winner in bold.

==== GT ====
Pos	Manufacturer	STP		LBH	AUS		DET		LRP		TOR	MOH		SON	HOU	Points
1	(United States) Cadillac	3	3	2	**1**	**2**	**1**	2	**2**	**1**	**1**	2	4	**1**	1	109
2	(Germany) Audi	2	**1**	**1**	2	1	4	**3**	4	4	4	3	3	2	**4**	82
3	(Sweden) Volvo	**1**	2	10	4	3	2	1	5	3	5	**1**	**1**	4	2	80
4	(United States) Chevrolet	6	4	3	6	4			1	12	3	6	5	11		30
5	(Germany) AMG Customer Sports	9	8	6	5	10	5	5	7	5	10					9
6	(Germany) Porsche	15	6	7	12	12	6	7								2
Pos	Manufacturer	STP		LBH	AUS		DET		LRP		TOR	MOH		SON	HOU	Points

Color	Result
Gold	Winner
Silver	2nd place
Bronze	3rd place
Green	4th–6th place
Dark Blue	Finished (Outside Points)
Purple	Did not finish
Blank	Did not participate

==== GTS ====
Pos	Manufacturer	STP		LBH	AUS		DET		LRP		TOR	MOH		SON	HOU	Points
1	(United States) Chevrolet	**2**	2	**1**	**1**	**1**	3	**8**	**1**	**2**	**1**	3	1	2	1	109
2	(South Korea) Kia	6	5	5	4	2	**1**	2	4	3	4	**1**	**4**	6	3	63
3	(Japan) Acura	3	3	2	8	4	9	4	5	9	8	2	2	21	2	46
4	(United States) Ford	7	8	10	6	5	4	1	9	8	5	6	7	4	6	22
5	(Germany) Audi								19	25		16	20		14	0
Pos	Manufacturer	STP		LBH	AUS		DET		LRP		TOR	MOH		SON	HOU	Points

==== TC ====
Pos	Manufacturer	AUS			LRP			TOR		MOH		SON		HOU		Points
1	(Japan) Honda	**1**	**1**	**1**	1	**1**	1	2	2	3	2	**1**	**1**	**1**	**1**	124
2	(South Korea) Kia				3	9	3			10	10	7	7			10
Pos	Manufacturer	AUS			LRP			TOR		MOH		SON		HOU		Points
