= 2011 IMSA Prototype Lites season =

2011 IMSA Prototype Lites

Seasons
- ← 2010 2012 →

The 2011 IMSA Prototype Lites season is the sixth season of the International Motor Sports Association's Prototype Lites championship. The season consisted of fourteen rounds at seven race meetings, beginning at Sebring International Raceway on March 17, and concluding at Road Atlanta on September 30. Ricardo Vera won the championship in the L1 class, and Robert Sabato won the L2 class championship.

== Schedule and results ==
All races supported the 2011 American Le Mans Series season. All rounds consisted of 30 minute races.

Rnd	Date	Circuit	Location	Lites 1 Winning Team	Lites 2 Winning Team
Rnd	Date	Circuit	Location	Lites 1 Winning Driver	Lites 2 Winning Driver
1	March 17	Sebring International Raceway	Sebring, Florida	#6 Performance Tech	#75 BERG Racing
1	March 17	Sebring International Raceway	Sebring, Florida	(United States) Daniel Goldburg	(United States) Ari Straus
2	March 18	Sebring International Raceway	Sebring, Florida	#79 Eurosport Racing	#22 6th Gear Racing
2	March 18	Sebring International Raceway	Sebring, Florida	(United States) Lucas Downs	(Canada) Robert Sabato
3	July 8	Lime Rock Park	Lakeville, Connecticut	#4 Eurosport Racing	#22 6th Gear Racing
3	July 8	Lime Rock Park	Lakeville, Connecticut	(United States) Antonio Downs	(Canada) Robert Sabato
4	July 9	Lime Rock Park	Lakeville, Connecticut	#4 Eurosport Racing	#22 6th Gear Racing
4	July 9	Lime Rock Park	Lakeville, Connecticut	(United States) Antonio Downs	(Canada) Robert Sabato
5	July 23	Mosport International Raceway	Bowmanville, Ontario	#34 Eurosport Racing	#22 6th Gear Racing
5	July 23	Mosport International Raceway	Bowmanville, Ontario	(United States) Jon Brownson	(Canada) Robert Sabato
6	July 24	Mosport International Raceway	Bowmanville, Ontario	#14 Comprent Motorsports	#22 6th Gear Racing
6	July 24	Mosport International Raceway	Bowmanville, Ontario	(United States) Jonathan Gore	(Canada) Robert Sabato
7	August 5	Mid-Ohio Sports Car Course	Lexington, Ohio	#14 Comprent Motorsports	#22 6th Gear Racing
7	August 5	Mid-Ohio Sports Car Course	Lexington, Ohio	(United States) Jonathan Gore	(Canada) Robert Sabato
8	August 6	Mid-Ohio Sports Car Course	Lexington, Ohio	#37 Intersport Racing	#22 6th Gear Racing
8	August 6	Mid-Ohio Sports Car Course	Lexington, Ohio	(Puerto Rico) Ricardo Vera	(Canada) Robert Sabato
9	August 20	Road America	Elkhart Lake, Wisconsin	#34 Eurosport Racing	#22 6th Gear Racing
9	August 20	Road America	Elkhart Lake, Wisconsin	(United States) Jon Brownson	(Canada) Robert Sabato
10	August 21	Road America	Elkhart Lake, Wisconsin	#21 Comprent Motorsports	#22 6th Gear Racing
10	August 21	Road America	Elkhart Lake, Wisconsin	(United States) Charlie Shears	(Canada) Robert Sabato
11	September 17	Mazda Raceway Laguna Seca	Monterey, California	#79 Eurosport Racing	#5 Level 5 Motorsports
11	September 17	Mazda Raceway Laguna Seca	Monterey, California	(United States) Lucas Downs	(United States) Scott Tucker
12	September 18	Mazda Raceway Laguna Seca	Monterey, California	#37 Intersport Racing	#5 Level 5 Motorsports
12	September 18	Mazda Raceway Laguna Seca	Monterey, California	(Puerto Rico) Ricardo Vera	(United States) Scott Tucker
13	September 29	Road Atlanta	Braselton, Georgia	#77 Comprent Motorsports	#5 Level 5 Motorsports
13	September 29	Road Atlanta	Braselton, Georgia	(United States) Sean Rayhall	(United States) Scott Tucker
14	September 30	Road Atlanta	Braselton, Georgia	#77 Comprent Motorsports	#5 Level 5 Motorsports
14	September 30	Road Atlanta	Braselton, Georgia	(United States) Sean Rayhall	(United States) Scott Tucker

== Championship standings ==
Points are awarded to the top 15 finishers in each class.

Position	1st	2nd	3rd	4th	5th	6th	7th	8th	9th	10th	11th	12th	13th	14th	15th
Points	20	18	16	14	12	10	9	8	7	6	5	4	3	2	1

=== Lites 1 ===
Pos	Driver	SEB		LRP		MOS		MOH		ROA		LAG		ATL		Pts
1	(Puerto Rico) Ricardo Vera	5	7	5	3	4	2	5	1	6	4	2	1	4	3	205
2	(United States) Antonio Downs	21	4	1	1	11	3	6	12	3	2	5	3	6	5	182
3	(United States) Gerry Kraut	6	8	3	2	3	13	2	8	7	3	7	4	7	6	170
4	(United States) Jonathan Gore	4	3			2	1	1	5	2	5	3	9	3	16	169
5	(United States) Jon Brownson	9	2			1	4			1	7	9	8	5	4	129
6	(Republic of Ireland) Patrick O'Neill	17	5	6	4			3	4			3	2			101
7	(United States) Lucas Downs	3	1	DNS	DNS			7	3	12	DNS	1	5			97
8	(United States) Daniel Mancini (M)	19	10	7	5	13	6	9	6			10	7	14	9	90
9	(United States) Darryl Shoff			8	13	5	5			13	10	13	11	9	11	76
10	(United States) Daniel Goldburg	1	13	4	7							8	16			58
11	(United States) Tristan Nunez	2	20											2	2	55
12	(United States) Richard Fant (M)	8	6							8	13	14	15	18	8	52
13	(United States) Matt Downs							4	2	5	12					50
14	(United States) Wayne Ducote	14	19			12	15			10	9			8	18	47
15	(United States) Ben Searcy	7	9	2	12											43
16	(United States) Sean Rayhall													1	1	40
17	(United States) Owen Kratz (M)	10	11							9	6	17	10	10	7	37
18	(United States) Charlie Shears (M)									4	1					34
19	(United States) Dan Weyland					6	12							12	15	31
20	(United States) David Ducote											6	6			20
21	(United States) Tim Vito (M)	11	12													9

Key
Color	Result
Gold	Winner
Silver	2nd place
Bronze	3rd place
Green	Points finish
Blue	Non-points finish
Purple	Did not finish (Ret)
Red	Did not qualify (DNQ)
Black	Disqualified (DSQ)
White	Did not start (DNS)
Blank	Did not arrive (DNA)
Blank	Withdrew entry before the event (WD)

(M) - Masters class

=== Lites 2 ===
Pos	Driver	SEB		LRP		MOS		MOH		ROA		LAG		ATL		Pts
1	(Canada) Robert Sabato	18	14	9	6	7	7	8	7	11	7	12	13			222
2	(United States) Alan Wilzig (M)	15	18	12	11	15	11	12	10	15	14	18	19	16	14	188
3	(Canada) Michal Chlumecky					8	8	10	DNS	12	15	15	17	13	12	152
4	(Canada) Max DeAngelis	20	17			10	10	11	11			16	14	15	13	144
5	(United States) Jim Garrett (M)	13	16	11	8	9	9	14	13							122
6	(United States) Scott Tucker			DNS	DNS					15	11	11	12	11	10	112
7	(United States) Brian Fowler			13	10	14	14	13	9			19	18			100
8	(United States) Ari Straus	12	21	10	9											64
9	(United States) Lee Alexander	16	15													32
10	Alain Nadal													17	17	24
