= 2005 Trans-Am Series =

American sports car racing competition

Seasons
- ← 2004 2009 →

The 2005 Trans-Am Series was the fortieth season of the Sports Car Club of America's Trans-Am Series. This would be the final complete season until the series returned in 2009. (Two events were held in Topeka in 2006, but are considered to be exhibition and thus no championship was awarded.)

== Results ==
Round	Circuit	Winning driver	Winning vehicle
1	Long Beach	(United States) Randy Ruhlman	Chevrolet Corvette
2	Portland	(Germany) Klaus Graf	Jaguar XKR
3	Cleveland	(United States) Randy Ruhlman	Chevrolet Corvette
4	Toronto	(United States) Paul Gentilozzi	Jaguar XKR
5	Edmonton	(United States) Greg Pickett	Jaguar XKR
6	San Jose	(United States) Boris Said	Ford Mustang
7	Denver	(Germany) Klaus Graf	Jaguar XKR
8	Road America	(Germany) Klaus Graf	Jaguar XKR
9	Montreal	(Germany) Klaus Graf	Jaguar XKR

== Final points standings ==
Place	Driver	Points
1	(Germany) Klaus Graf	246
2	(United States) Randy Ruhlman	226
3	(United States) Greg Pickett	219
4	(United States) Tomy Drissi	195
5	(Australia) Joey Scarallo	188
6	(United States) Paul Gentilozzi	176
7	(Canada) Hima Maher	143
8	(United States) John Baucom	129
9	(United States) Moneca Kolvyn	127
10	(United States) Paul Fix II	105
11	(United States) Tom Cowen	92
12	(United States) Max Lagod	73
13	(United States) Mike Davis	70
14	(United States) Michael Lewis	58
15	(United States) Philip Simms	55
16	(United States) Boris Said	54
17	(United States) Tor Krueger	29
18	(Canada) Charlie Webster	23
19	(United States) Kevin Nielsen	18
20	(United States) Jeff Emery	17
21	(United States) Tom Sherrill	17
22	(United States) Cliff Ebben	17
24	(United States) Amy Ruman	16
25	(United States) James Bradley	14
26	(Canada) Blaise Csida	13
27	(United States) Csaba Bujdoso	12
28	(Canada) Gordon Vipond	11
29	(United States) John Schaller	9
