= 2010 Trans-Am Series =

American sports car racing competition

Seasons
- ← 2009 2011 →

The 2010 Trans-Am Series was the 42nd season of the SCCA's Trans-Am Series. It began on May 8 and ran for ten rounds. Chevrolet nearly swept the season, with Jaguar winning the opening round at New Jersey. 2010 was also the first Trans Am season since 2002 in which an American manufacturer won the championship.

== Results ==
Round	Circuit	Winning driver	Winning vehicle
1	New Jersey Motorsports Park	(United States) Tomy Drissi	Jaguar XKR
2	Mosport International Raceway	(Canada) Kenny Wilden	Chevrolet Corvette
3	Miller Motorsports Park	(United States) Tony Ave	Chevrolet Corvette
4	Road America	(United States) Tony Ave	Chevrolet Corvette
5	Lime Rock Park	(United States) Tony Ave	Chevrolet Corvette
6	Toronto	(Dominican Republic) R. J. López	Chevrolet Corvette
7	Autobahn Country Club	(United States) Tony Ave	Chevrolet Corvette
8	Brainerd International Raceway	(United States) Tony Ave	Chevrolet Corvette
9	Virginia International Raceway	(Dominican Republic) R. J. López	Chevrolet Corvette
10	Road Atlanta	(United States) Tony Ave	Chevrolet Corvette

== Final points standings ==
Place	Driver	Points
1	(United States) Tony Ave	1280
2	(Dominican Republic) R. J. López	1079
3	(United States) Tomy Drissi	984
4	(United States) Simon Gregg	938
5	(United States) Amy Ruman	583
6	(United States) Glen Jung	447
7	(Trinidad and Tobago) Daniel Ramoutarsingh	351
8	(United States) Mike Skeen	282
9	(United States) Bobby Sak	272
10	(United States) Doug Harrington	260
11	(United States) Buddy Cisar	220
12	(Canada) Blaise Csida	183
13	(United States) Rick Dittman	176
14	(United States) Denny Lamers	176
15	(United States) Elmer Shannon	168
16	(United States) John Baucom	156
17	(Canada) Kenny Wilden	139
18	(United States) Cliff Ebben	118
19	(United States) Jim Derhaag	93
20	(United States) John Schaller	92
21	(United States) Kyle Kelley	84
22	(United States) Harold Musler	84
23	(Australia) Joey Scarallo	80
24	(United States) George Smith	80
25	(United States) J. R. Smith	76
26	(United States) Bob Monette	76
27	(United States) Jim Bradley	72
28	(United States) Michael Lewis	72
29	(United States) Kevin Rich	68
30	(United States) Paige Monette	68
31	(United States) Daniel Parr	64
32	(United States) Zach Monette	60
33	(United States) Terry Giles	53
34	(United States) David Fershtand	47
–	(Canada) Greg Clifton	0
–	(United States) Greg Pickett	0
