= Brian Fowler (racing driver) =

Jamaican racing driver

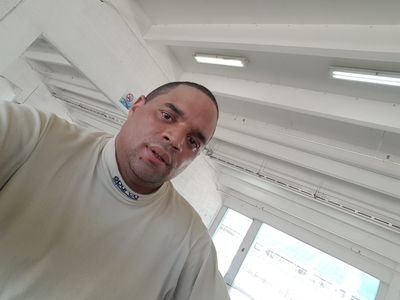
- Fowler in 2016.
- Nationality: (Jamaica) Jamaican
- Born: 11 November 1971 (age 54) Jamaica (St Andrew)

FIA F4 career

Brian Fowler (born 11 November 1971, in St Andrew, Jamaica) is a Jamaican racing driver competing in the FIA F4 US Championship.

Fowler made his professional debut in the 2011 IMSA Prototype Lites Championship with ANSA motosports. After a year hiatus, he returned for the 2013 Pirelli World Challenge in TCB with Shea Racing.

Fowler also competed in the 2014 Canadian Formula 1600 super series, that had events supporting the Canadian Formula 1 Grand Prix at Circuit Gilles Villeneuve and Honda Indy Toronto.
