= Jaguar XK =

Series of grand tourers under the British Jaguar marque

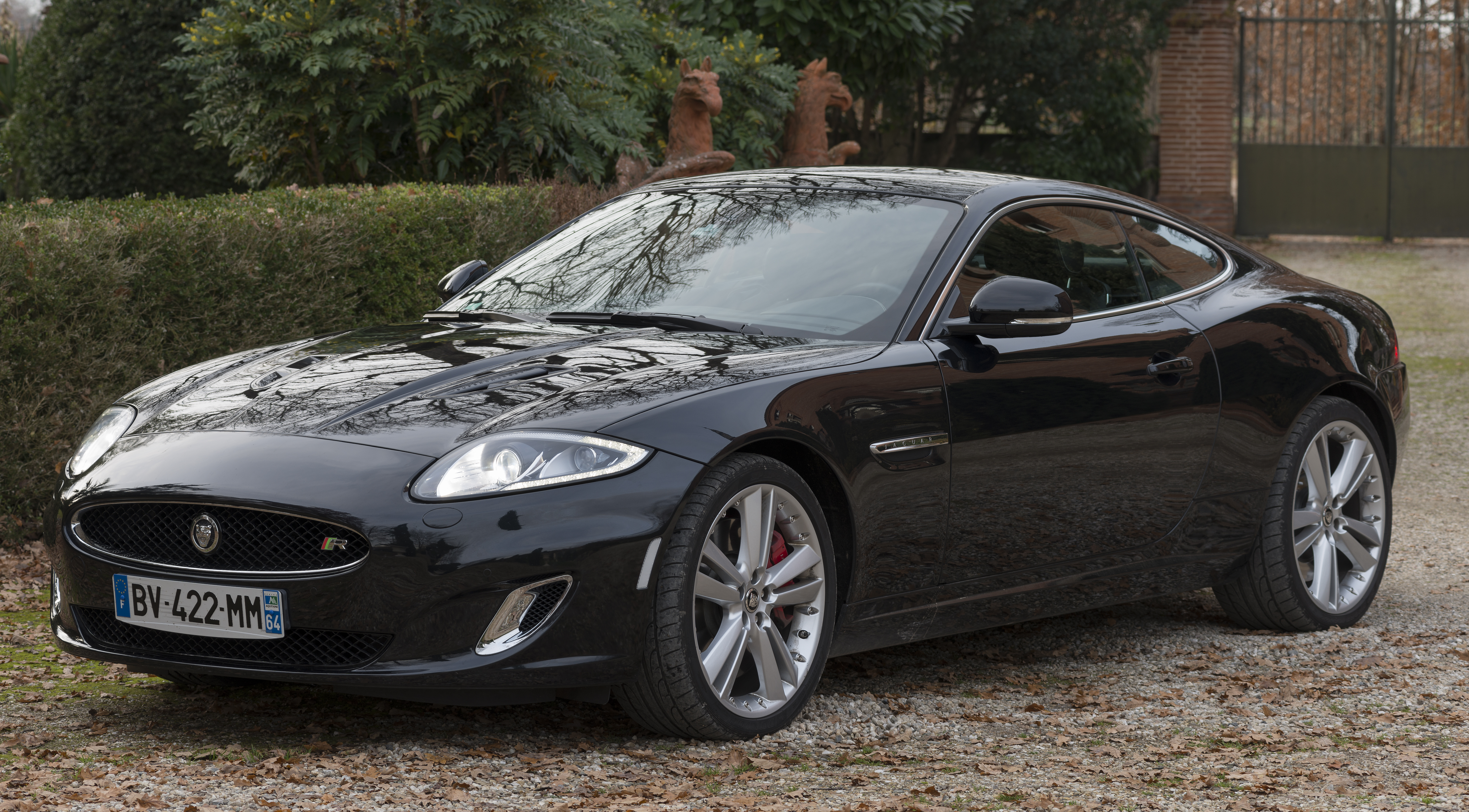
- Jaguar XKR (X150)

Overview
- Manufacturer: Jaguar Cars (1996–2012); Jaguar Land Rover (2013–2014)
- Also called: Jaguar XKR/XK8
- Production: 1996–2014
- Model years: 1996–2015
- Assembly: United Kingdom: Coventry (Browns Lane plant: X100); United Kingdom: Birmingham (Castle Bromwich Assembly: X150)
- Designer: Geoff Lawson (X100); Ian Callum (X150)

Body and chassis
- Class: Grand tourer (S)
- Body style: 2-door coupé (X100); 3-door liftback coupé (X150); 2-door convertible
- Layout: Front-engine, rear-wheel-drive
- Platform: Jaguar XJS (modified; X100); Jaguar XJ (X350)

Powertrain
- Engine: 4.0–5.0 L Jaguar AJ V8 (supercharged for the XKR related models only)
- Transmission: 5-speed automatic; 6-speed automatic

Chronology
- Predecessor: Jaguar XJS
- Successor: Jaguar F-Type

The Jaguar XK is a two-door 2+2 grand tourer manufactured and marketed by Jaguar Cars from 1996–2012 and by Jaguar Land Rover from 2013–2014 in hatchback coupé and convertible body styles, across two generations. The XK was introduced at the Geneva Motor Show in March 1996 and was discontinued in July 2014.

The first generation was marketed as the XK8, replacing the XJS and was Jaguar's first 8-cylinder model since the Daimler 250, introducing the all-new Jaguar AJ-V8 engine. The XK8 shared its platform with the Aston Martin DB7 which was itself based on the stillborn XJ41/42 project built on a modified XJ-S chassis conceived in the mid-1980s. The second generation of the XK, noted for its aluminium monocoque chassis and construction, was launched in 2006 for the 2007 model year. The XKR performance variant was introduced in both of the generations with the second generation also offering a more powerful XKR-S variant.

== XK8/XKR (1996–2006) ==
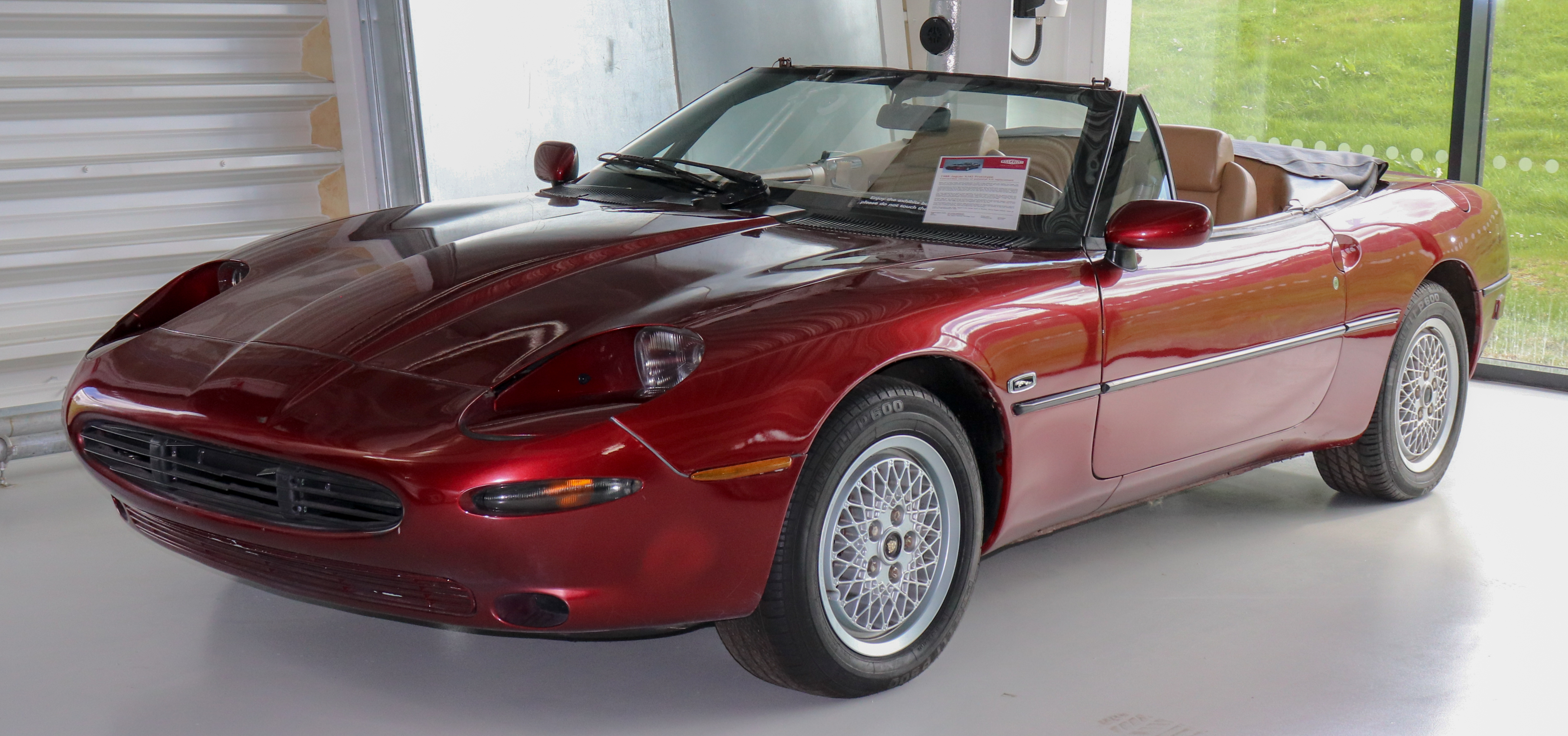
XJ42 Prototype

The XK8 was launched in 1996 to replace the XJS designed by then Jaguar design director Geoff Lawson. It was available in two body styles – a two-door coupé and two-door convertible with both variations featuring 2+2 seating. The car was the first in the Jaguar line-up to use Jaguar's newly developed 32-valve V8 engine – the AJ-V8 which had a displacement of 4.0 litres.

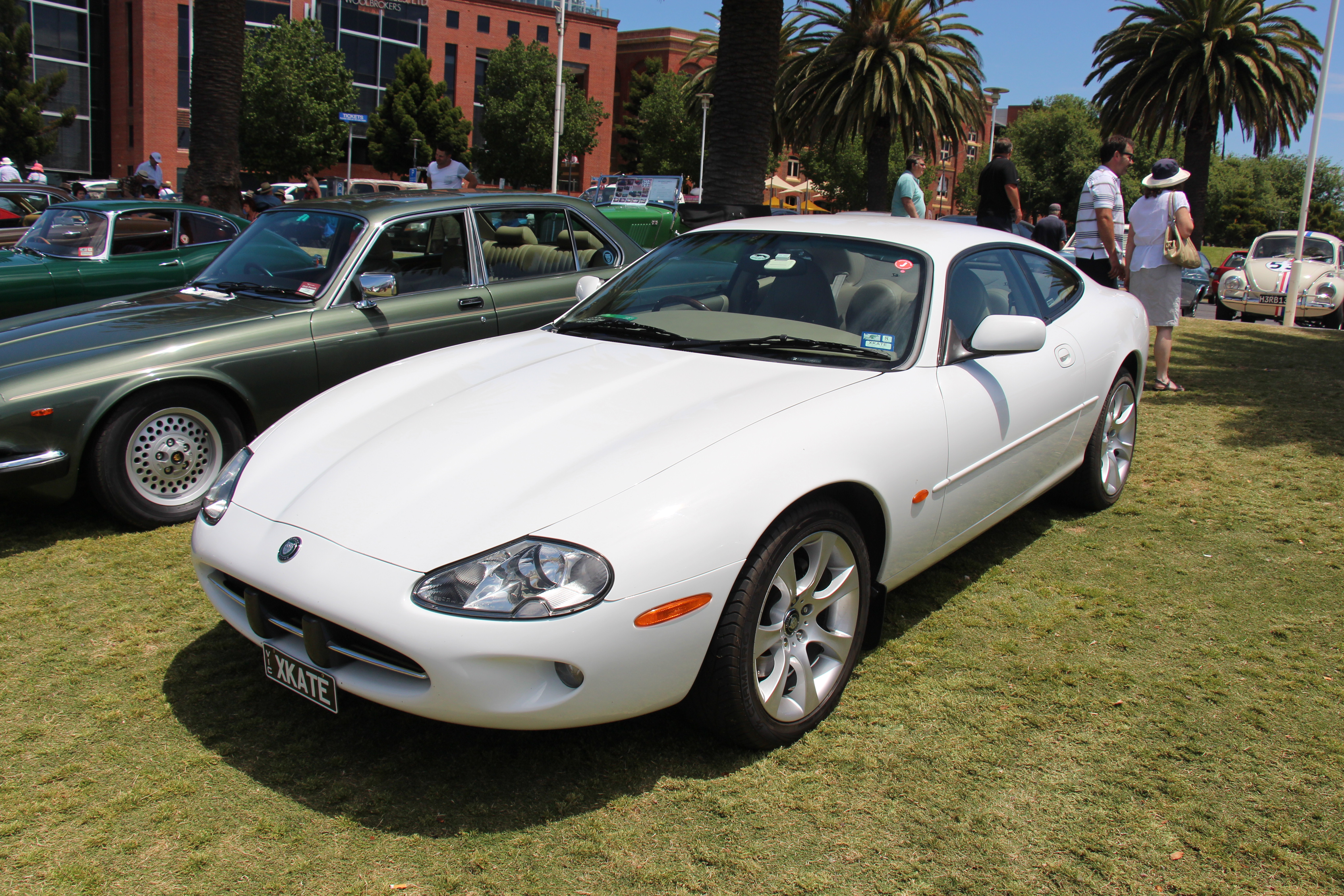
XK8 Coupé

The XK8 was joined by a more powerful XKR in 1998. The XKR featured a supercharged variation of the V8 engine rated at 276 kW (375 PS; 370 hp). The engine was shared with the XJR but featured a new intercooler and a two-piece driveshaft. The supercharger was manufactured by Eaton and displaced at 2.0 litres. It generated 11.9 pounds of boost pressure to contribute to the higher power output. Visual differences from the XK8 included a rear spoiler, mesh front grille and hood louvres on the bonnet for improved airflow to the engine.

The XK8 came standard with 17-inch alloy wheels, while 18-inch (standard on the XKR), 19-inch, and 20-inch wheels were available for the XK8 and XKR at an additional cost. Jaguar's Adaptive Cruise Control is an optional feature available on both models. Both models came with all-leather interior, burl walnut trim, and side airbags. Two interior configurations were offered, the sport configuration was aimed at young buyers and had a leather interior with cloth seats while the classic trim featured more amenities.

The XK range received a mechanical update in 2002 with the engines in both the XK8 and XKR models being enlarged to 4.2 litres and gaining more power, the front headlamps were also updated by the addition of a clear lens. Further changes included new exterior colours and wheels along with different badging. The models were revised again in spring 2004 and notable changes included new wheel designs, bigger front and rear spoilers and a redesigned grille.

Initially, the ZF 5HP24 five-speed automatic transmission was coupled to the conventionally aspirated 4.0-litre model and a Mercedes W5A580 five-speed transmission to the supercharged version, but in 2002 the new ZF 6HP26 six-speed automatic transmission was fitted in both versions of the 4.2-litre model.

== XK/XKR (2006–2014) ==
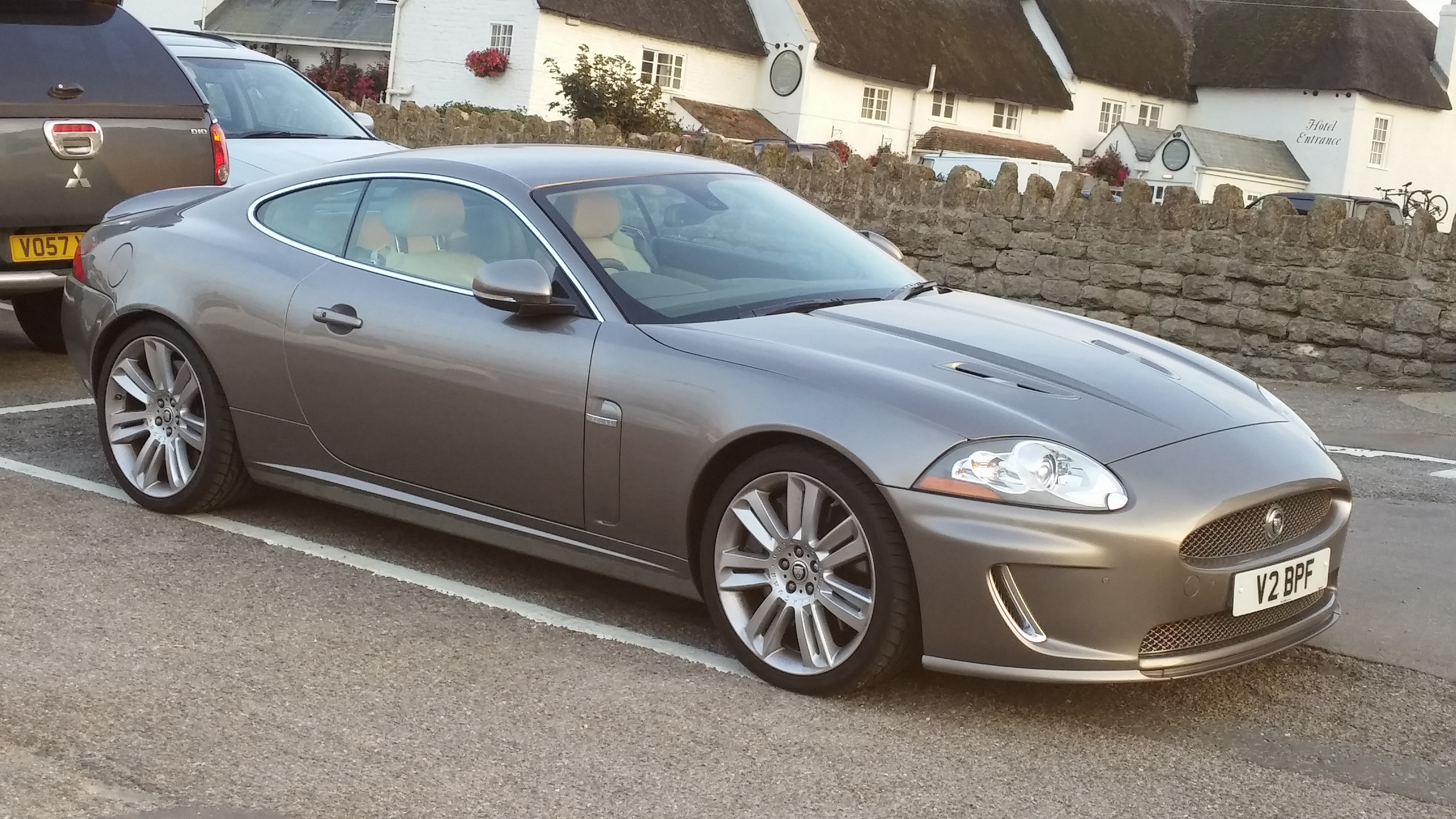
XKR (X150) Coupé

The second generation of the XK debuted in 2005 at the Frankfurt Motor Show in Germany, styled by Jaguar's chief designer Ian Callum. The X150's grille was designed to recall the 1961 E-Type. The XK is an evolution of the Advanced Lightweight Coupé (ALC) introduced at the 2005 North American International Auto Show. The XK features a bonded and riveted aluminium chassis shared with the XJ and body panels, both a first for a Jaguar grand tourer. Compared to the XK (X100), the XKR (X150) is 61.0 mm (2.4 in) wider and is 162.6 mm (6.4 in) longer. It is also 91 kg (200 lb) lighter resulting in performance and fuel consumption improvements. Unlike the X100, the X150 has no wood trim on the interior offered as standard equipment. The interior featured steering column mounted shift paddles. A more powerful XKR version having a supercharged variant of the engine was introduced in 2007.

The standard XK model has a limited top speed of 254 km/h (158 mph) while the high performance XKR has the limited top speed increased to 280 km/h (174 mph).

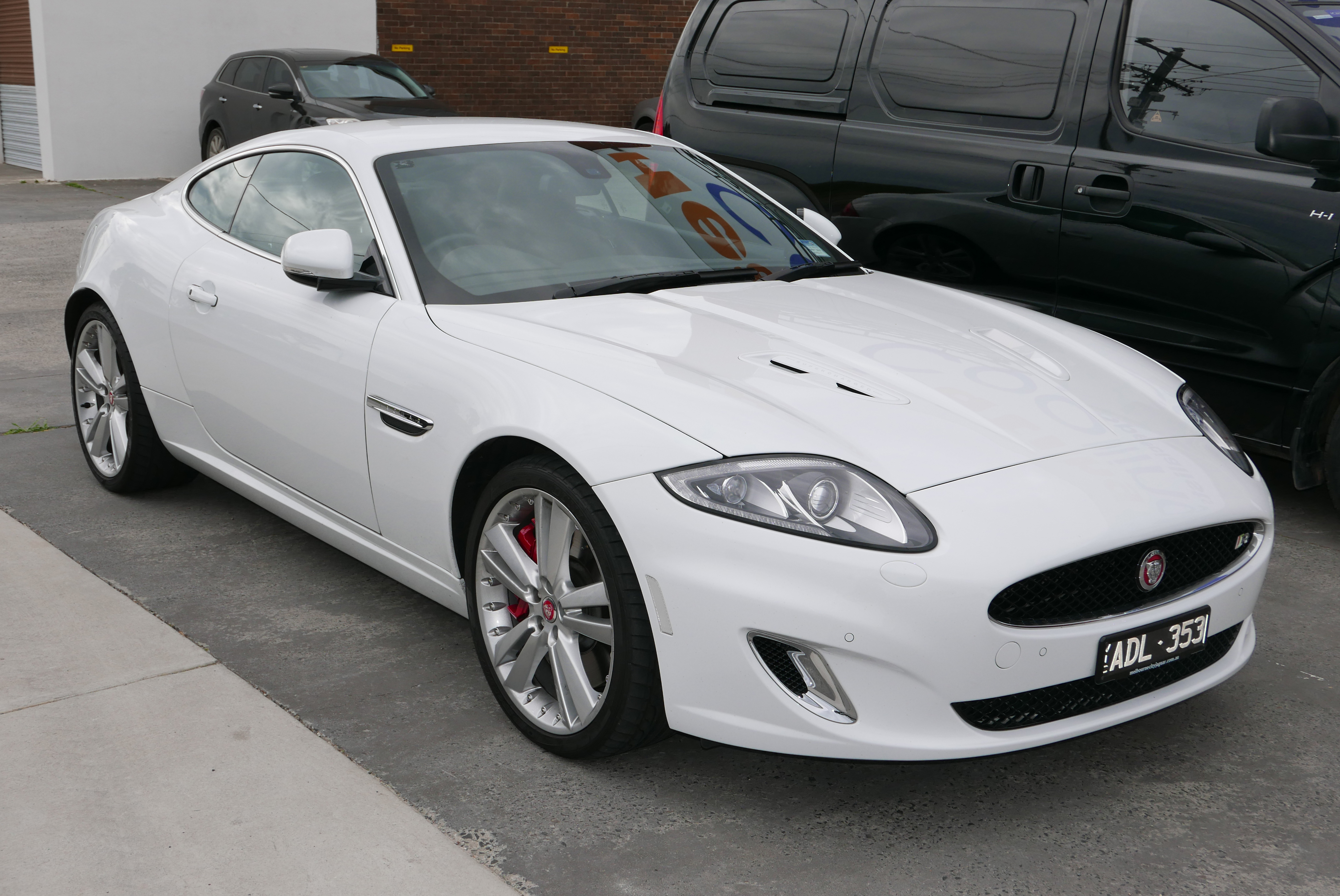
Jaguar XKR (post 2011 facelift)

The XK received a facelift in 2009, with minor alterations to front and rear lights and bumper designs, together with the introduction of a new 5.0-litre V8 for both the naturally aspirated XK and the supercharged XKR. The interior also received some changes, in particular the introduction of the XF style rotary gear selector mated to the new ZF automatic transmission. The XK received a second and more minor facelift in 2011 with new front bumper and light design, which was presented at the New York Auto Show.

A higher performance variant of the XKR, the XKR-S, was introduced at the Geneva Motor Show in 2012. The XKR-S gained an additional 40-horsepower over the XKR bringing the 0–97 km/h (60 mph) acceleration time down to 4.4 seconds and the top speed up to 300 km/h (186 mph). A convertible version of the XKR-S was introduced in 2012.

Production of the XK ended in July 2014 without a replacement model. Most of the tooling is now used on the XK-based F-Type and the two models were produced concurrently on the same line from 2012–2014. However, the F-Type is not a successor to the XK.

== Motorsport ==
=== FIA GT2 ===
Jaguar XKR GT2
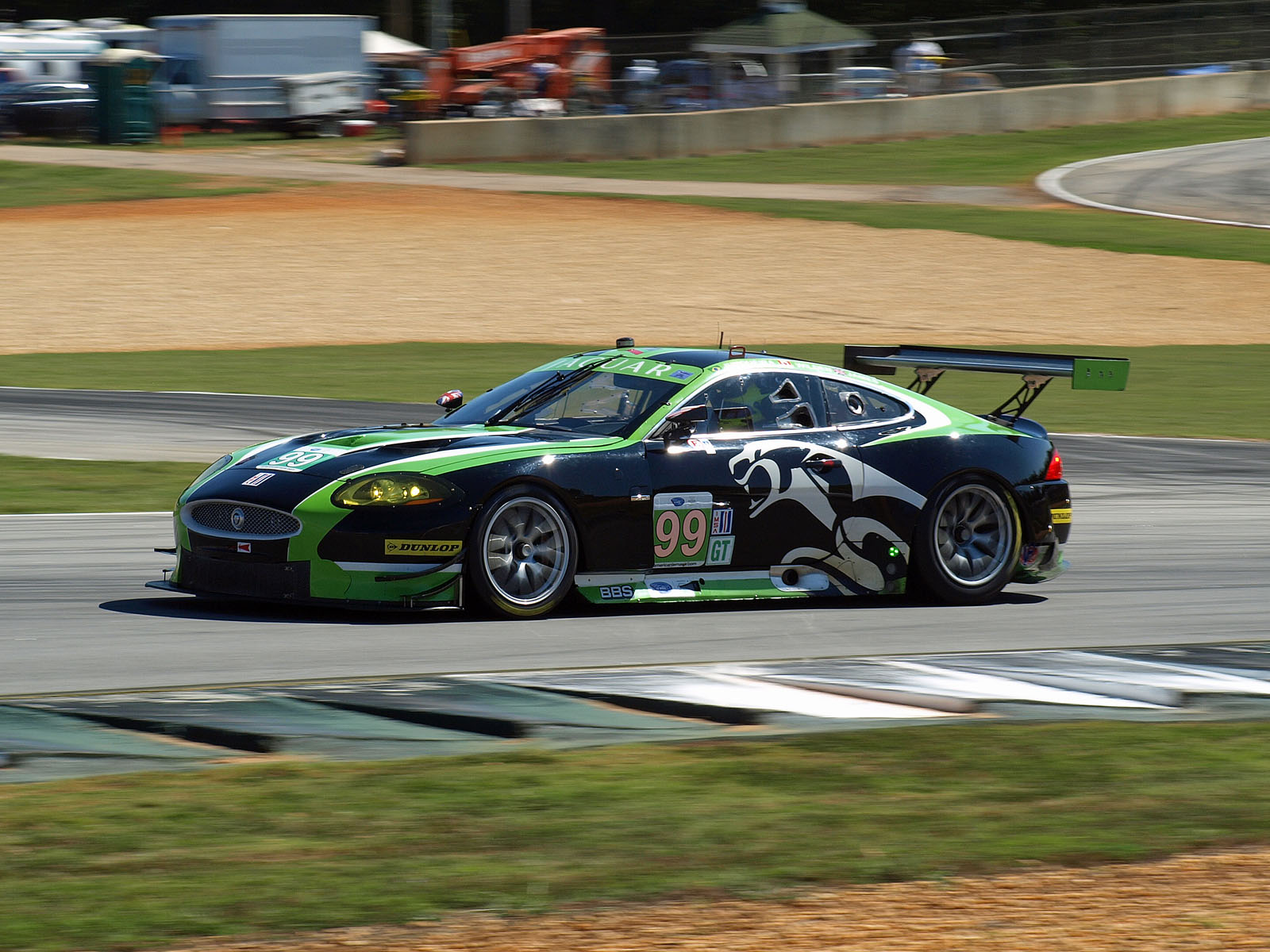
- Constructor: Jaguar
- Homologation: Group GT2
- Production: 2009–2011

Technical specifications
- Chassis: Carbon fibre composite and aluminium body panels on riveted and bonded aluminium spaceframe
- Length: 4,790 mm (188.6 in)
- Width: 1,970 mm (77.4 in)
- Height: 1,320.8 mm (52 in)
- Axle track: Front:1,503.7 mm (59.2 in); Rear:1,498.6 mm (59 in)
- Wheelbase: 2,750.8 mm (108.3 in)
- Engine: Jaguar AJ133S 5.0 L; 305.1 cu in (5,000 cc) V8 Supercharged front mid-mounted
- Torque: 461 N⋅m (340 lb⋅ft)
- Transmission: Hewland CST 6-speed sequential
- Power: 550 hp (558 PS; 410 kW)
- Weight: 1,245 kg (2,744.8 lb)
- Brakes: Front: Brembo six-piston calipers on 380 mm discs Rear: Brembo four-piston rear calipers on 350 mm discs
- Tyres: Dunlop; Yokohama
- Clutch: 5.5-inch Tilton metallic clutch

Competition history
- Notable entrants: (United States) JaguarRSR
- Notable drivers: (Scotland) Ryan Dalziel (United States) Tomy Drissi (United States) Paul Gentilozzi (Belgium) Marc Goossens (United States) P. J. Jones (Brazil) Bruno Junqueira (United Kingdom) Butch Leitzinger (Brazil) Cristiano da Matta (United States) Rocky Moran Jr. (Spain) Oriol Servià (United Kingdom) Andy Wallace
- Debut: 2009 Monterey Sports Car Championships
- Last event: 2011 Petit Le Mans
Races	Wins	Podiums	Poles
21	0	0	0

The Jaguar XKR GT2 was unveiled on September 25, 2009, at the 2009 Petit Le Mans. The car is based on the XKR and built in partnership by RSR Racing and Jaguar to conform to Group GT2 rules. It features the AJ133S 5-litre, supercharged V8 engine while using much of the production car's aluminium frame. The car made its competition debut at the final round of the 2009 American Le Mans Series at Laguna Seca with drivers Paul Gentilozzi and Marc Goossens. It classified 13th in class but failed to finish due to an issue with the drive train.

In 2010, JaguarRSR campaigned the car in its first full season in the American Le Mans Series. It had a best finish of ninth in class twice, failing to finish in three races, including a double retirement at the Petit Le Mans.

It entered the 2010 24 Hours of Le Mans, but were 13 seconds off the best qualifying GT2 entry before retiring after only four laps because of a loss of power. The organiser of the race, the Automobile Club de l’Ouest required a black box to be installed in every car. It was found to be incompatible with the car's electronics causing driver Marc Goossens to fall behind on the warm-up lap. The car made another international appearance at the final round of the Intercontinental Le Mans Cup at Zhuhai. It retired from the race after ten laps due to a loss of power.

For the 2011 American Le Mans Series season, Bruno Junqueira, P. J. Jones, Cristiano da Matta, Kenny Wilden, Rocky Moran Jr., Oriol Servià and Gentilozzi all drove at various races. It achieved its only points finish and highest finish of its career at Long Beach.
