= Tomy Drissi =

American racing driver and advertising professional (born 1958)

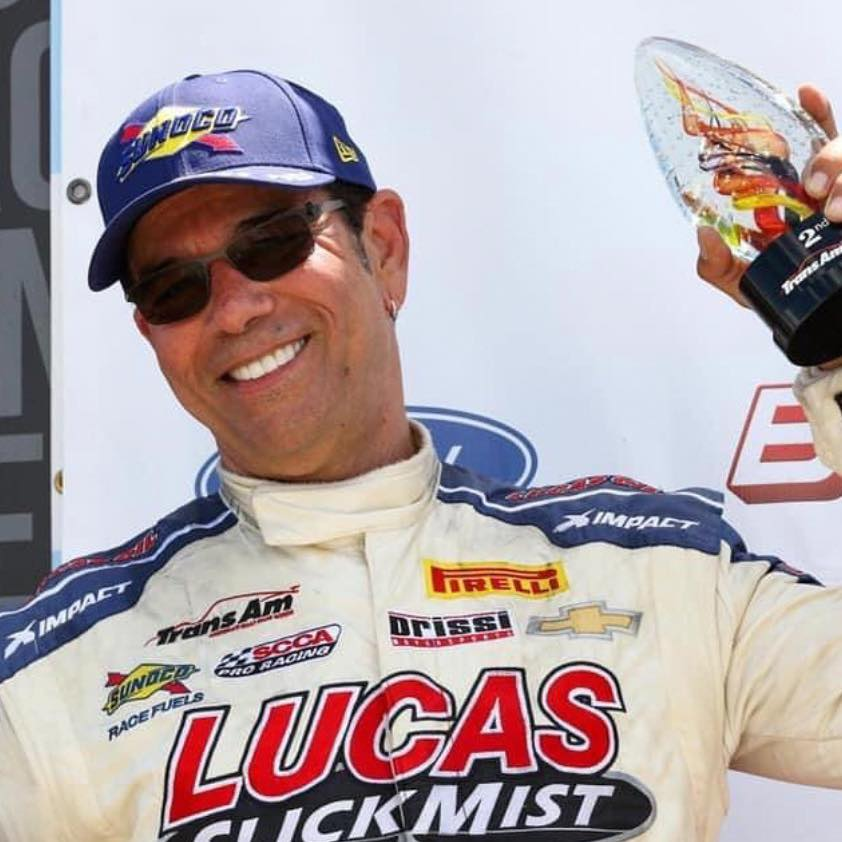
- Nationality: (United States) American
- Born: December 9, 1958 (age 67) Los Angeles, California, U.S.

Trans-Am Series career
- Debut season: 1999
- Current team: 3GT
- Categorisation: FIA Silver (until 2013); FIA Bronze (2014–)
- Car number: 8
- Former teams: Burtin Racing

Previous series
- 1999–2021 2005–2006 2006–2010: Trans-Am Series; Rolex Sports Car Series; Speed World Challenge

Championship titles
- 2009: Trans-Am Series

Awards
- 1999: Trans-Am Series Rookie of the Year

NASCAR Cup Series career
- 5 races run over 4 years
- 2018 position: 46th
- Best finish: 46th (2018)
- First race: 2012 Toyota/Save Mart 350 (Sonoma)
- Last race: 2018 Toyota/Save Mart 350 (Sonoma)
Wins	Top tens	Poles
0	0	0

NASCAR O'Reilly Auto Parts Series career
- 11 races run over 6 years
- 2016 position: 64th
- Best finish: 57th (2015)
- First race: 2010 NAPA Auto Parts 200 (Montreal)
- Last race: 2016 Road America 180 (Road America)
Wins	Top tens	Poles
0	0	0
- Statistics up to date as of November 18, 2018.

Tomy Drissi (/ˈdriːziː/ DREE-see; born December 9, 1958) is an American professional stock and sports car racing driver, and an advertising executive in the movie industry. A long-time competitor in the Sports Car Club of America's Trans-Am Series, he was the series' 2009 Champion.

== Racing career ==
Drissi first became involved in motorsports through his participation in illegal street racing, primarily on Mulholland Drive in Hollywood's Hollywood Hills, starting at the age of 16. He began legitimate competition in 1993, when he became involved in vintage racing, primarily at Willow Springs Raceway. Drissi's driving style proved "too aggressive" for the fragile vintage cars, and he moved to standard, modern race cars, making his debut in professional racing in 1999. Competing in the SCCA Trans-Am Series, Drissi won Rookie of the Year in his initial season. He would score his first win in the series the following year at the Long Beach Grand Prix. Competing in the series both before and after its mid-2000s hiatus, he won the first championship of the revitalized series in 2009.

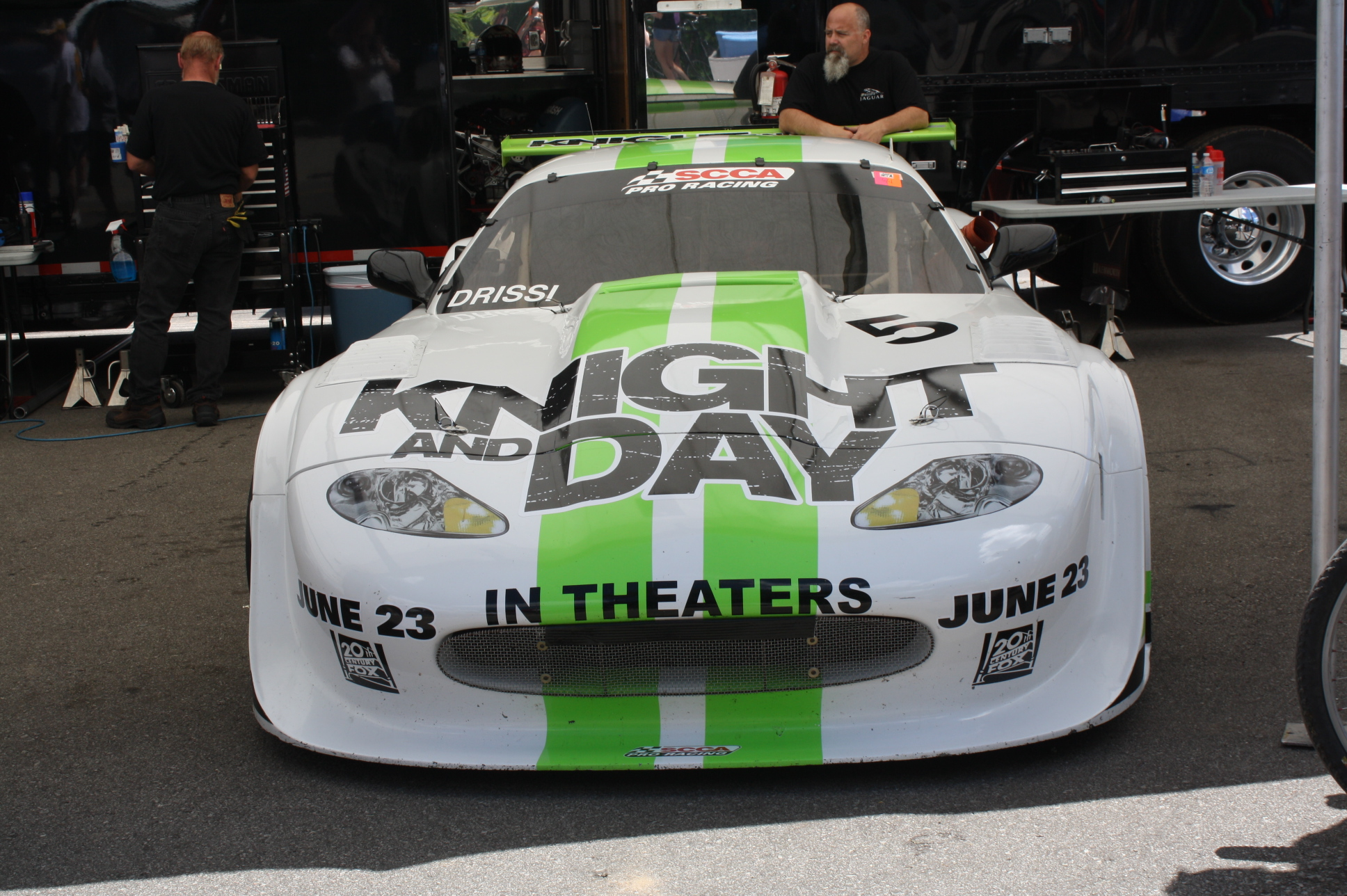
Drissi's 2010 Trans-Am car

Drissi also competed in the SCCA World Challenge series between 2006 and 2010; in 2003, he had begun competing in the sports cars of the American Le Mans Series, where he would make his primary effort in racing outside of Trans-Am; he currently drives in the series for RSR Racing, competing in the Prototype Challenge class, co-driving an Oreca FLM09 with Bruno Junqueira and Roberto González. As of 2012, he has scored two class wins during his career in the series, both coming during the 2011 season at the Mid-Ohio Sports Car Course and at the Baltimore Grand Prix.

Drissi also competed in nine Rolex Sports Car Series events in 2005 and 2006, posting a best finish of ninth on the road course at Phoenix Raceway in September 2005.

=== NASCAR ===
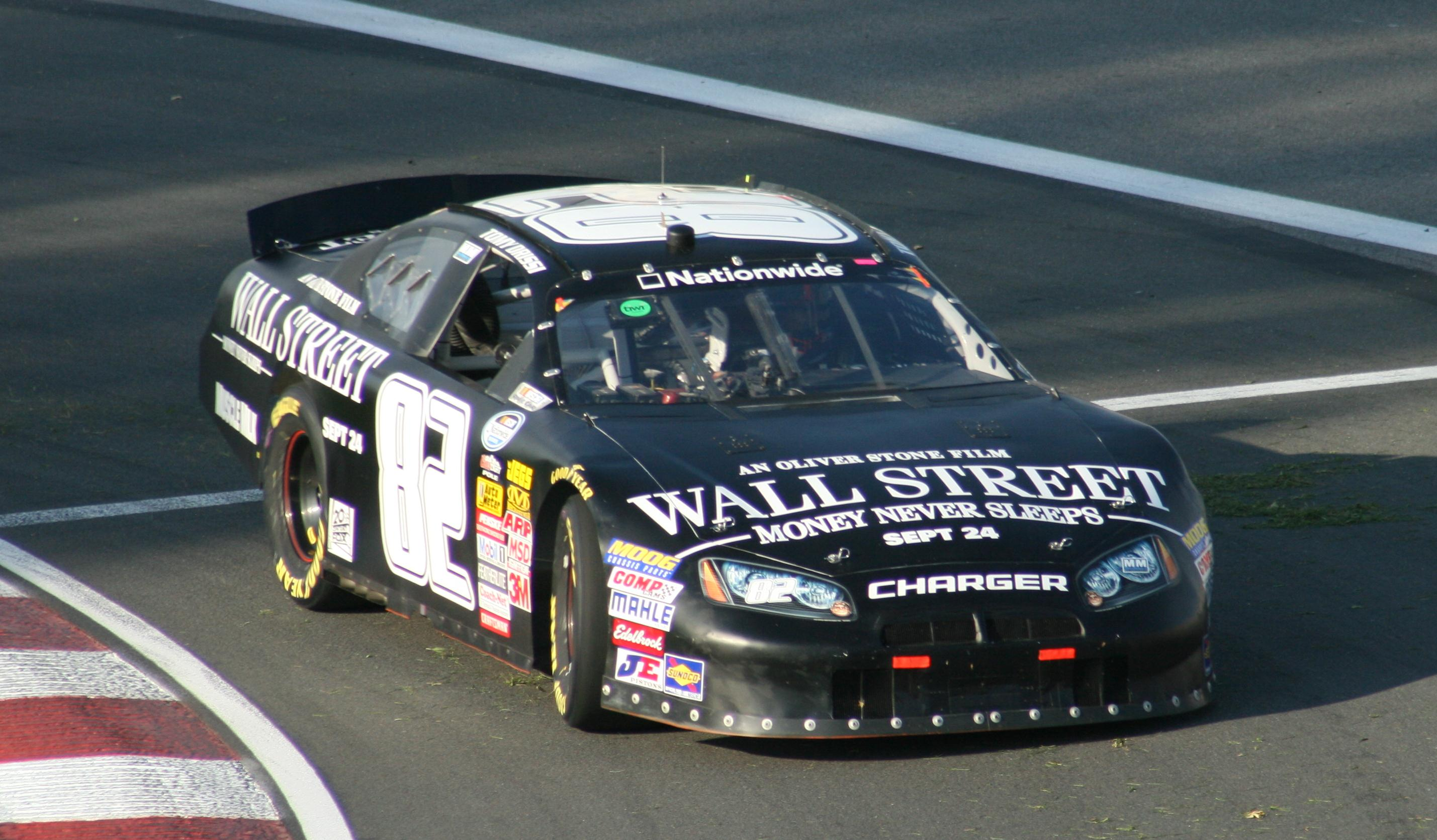
Drissi at Montreal in 2010

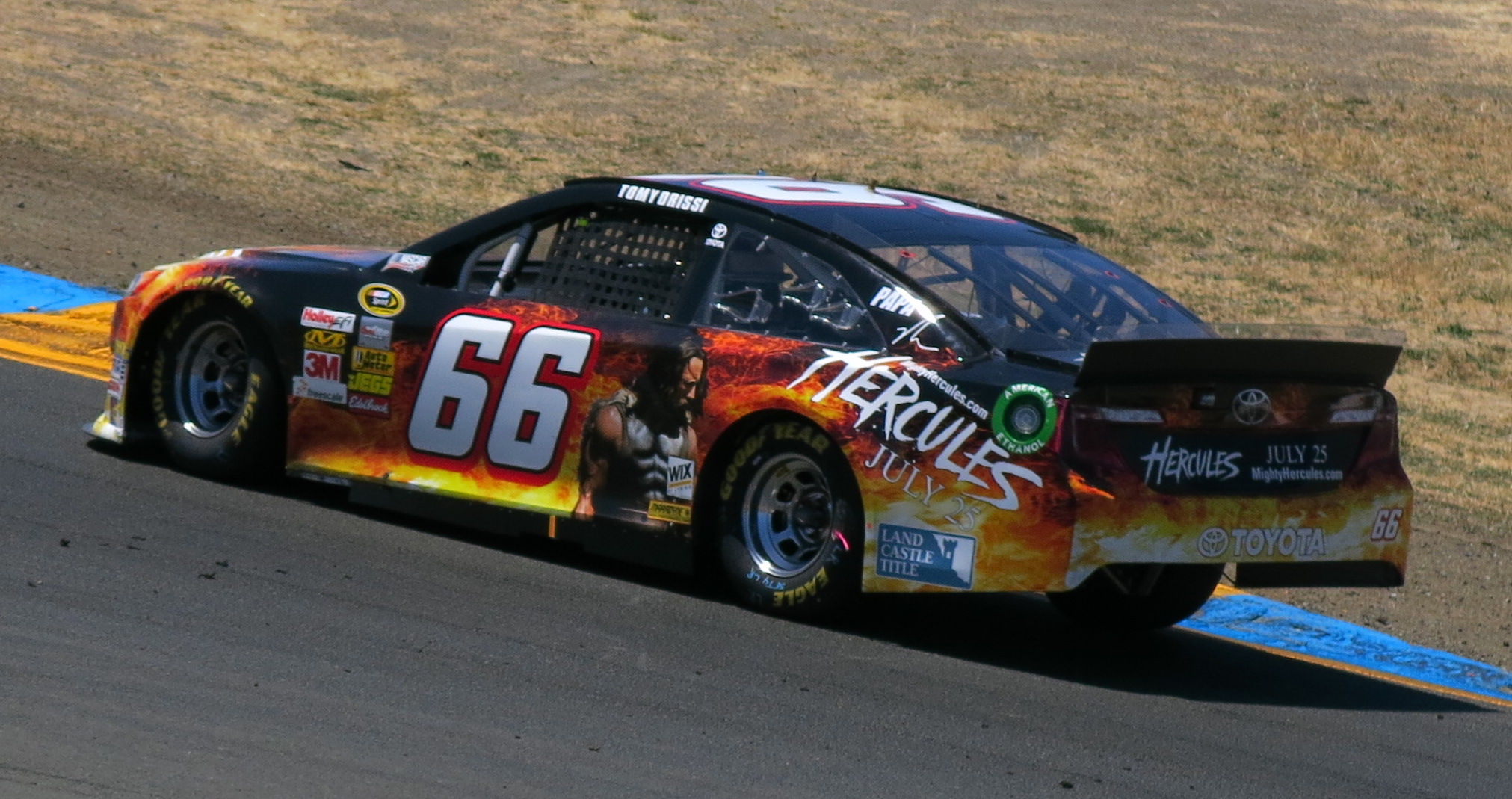
Drissi's No. 66 car at Sonoma Raceway in 2014

In 2010, Drissi took a test drive with Rick Ware Racing at Carolina Motorsports Park, hoping to kickstart some NASCAR activism. Drissi later made his debut in stock car competition, driving the No. 82 Dodge Charger for MacDonald Motorsports in the NASCAR Nationwide Series, competing in the NAPA Auto Parts 200 at Circuit Gilles Villeneuve in Montreal. He finished 18th in the event; the following year he would drive in two races in the Nationwide Series, driving the No. 75 Ford for Rick Ware Racing at Watkins Glen International, where he finished 27th, and at Montreal, finishing 34th. Drissi also competed in a single NASCAR K&N Pro Series West race in 2011 on the road course at Portland International Raceway, driving the No. 12 Toyota for Bill McAnally Racing; he would finish 22nd in the event.

Drissi drove the No. 26 car for Rick Ware Racing in the 2015 NASCAR Xfinity Series road course races at Road America, Watkins Glen, and Mid Ohio Sports Car Course with a best finish of 25th place. In 2016, Drissi joined TriStar Motorsports' No. 14 Arthritis Foundation Toyota, for the road races. On lap seventeen of the Zippo 200 at the Glen, Drissi was injured during a five-car pileup in the esses. It forced him to withdraw from the rest of the race as well as the following week's race at Mid-Ohio. Drissi recovered from the injury and returned to the #14 team weeks later at Road America where he finished 26th.

==== Monster Energy Cup Series ====
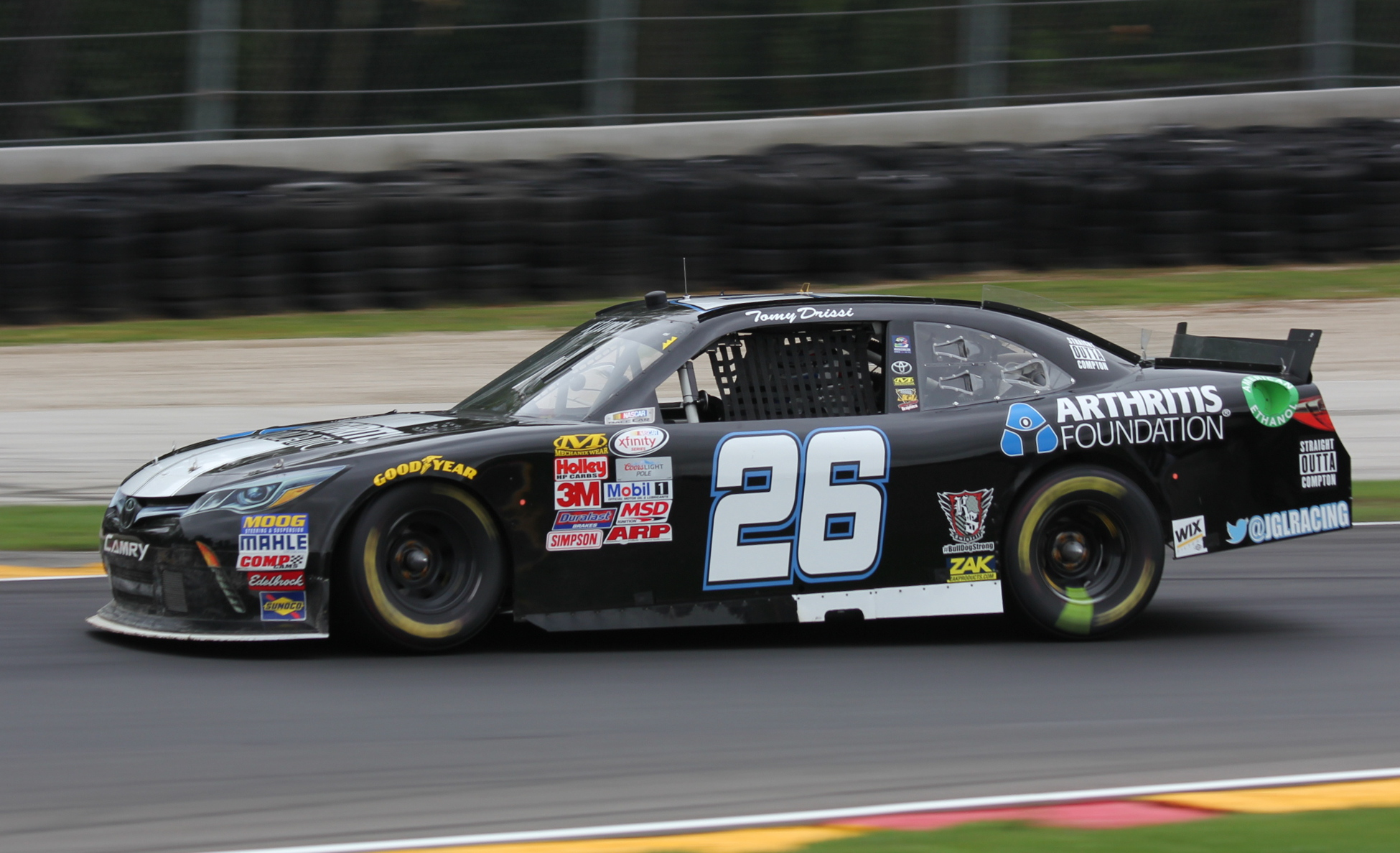
Drissi in his Xfinity Series car at Road America in 2015

In 2011, established as a "road course ringer", Drissi was hired by Max Q Motorsports, which had entered into a partnership with Rick Ware Racing, to drive the team's No. 37 Ford, sponsored by the movie Rise of the Planet of the Apes, in the NASCAR Sprint Cup Series at the Toyota/Save Mart 350 at Infineon Raceway. Drissi was not approved by NASCAR to compete in the event due to not having sufficient experience in the heavy Sprint Cup cars; Chris Cook substituted for Drissi, qualifying and driving the car in the event.

Drissi returned to Infineon (now known as Sonoma) for the 2012 Toyota/Save Mart 350, being hired to drive the No. 10 Chevrolet, sponsored by Ice Age: Continental Drift, for Tommy Baldwin Racing. Drissi returned to Sonoma in the 2013 Toyota/Save Mart 350 for NEMCO-Jay Robinson Racing, driving the No. 87 Toyota sponsored by The Wolverine, and drove again for the team at Watkins Glen International with sponsorship promoting The Counselor. A year later, he joined Identity Ventures Racing in the No. 66 Toyota with sponsorship from Hercules at Sonoma. He started last and finished 38th.

After four years away from Cup racing, he returned to the series for the 2018 Toyota/Save Mart 350, driving the No. 00 for StarCom Racing.

=== Trans-Am bans ===
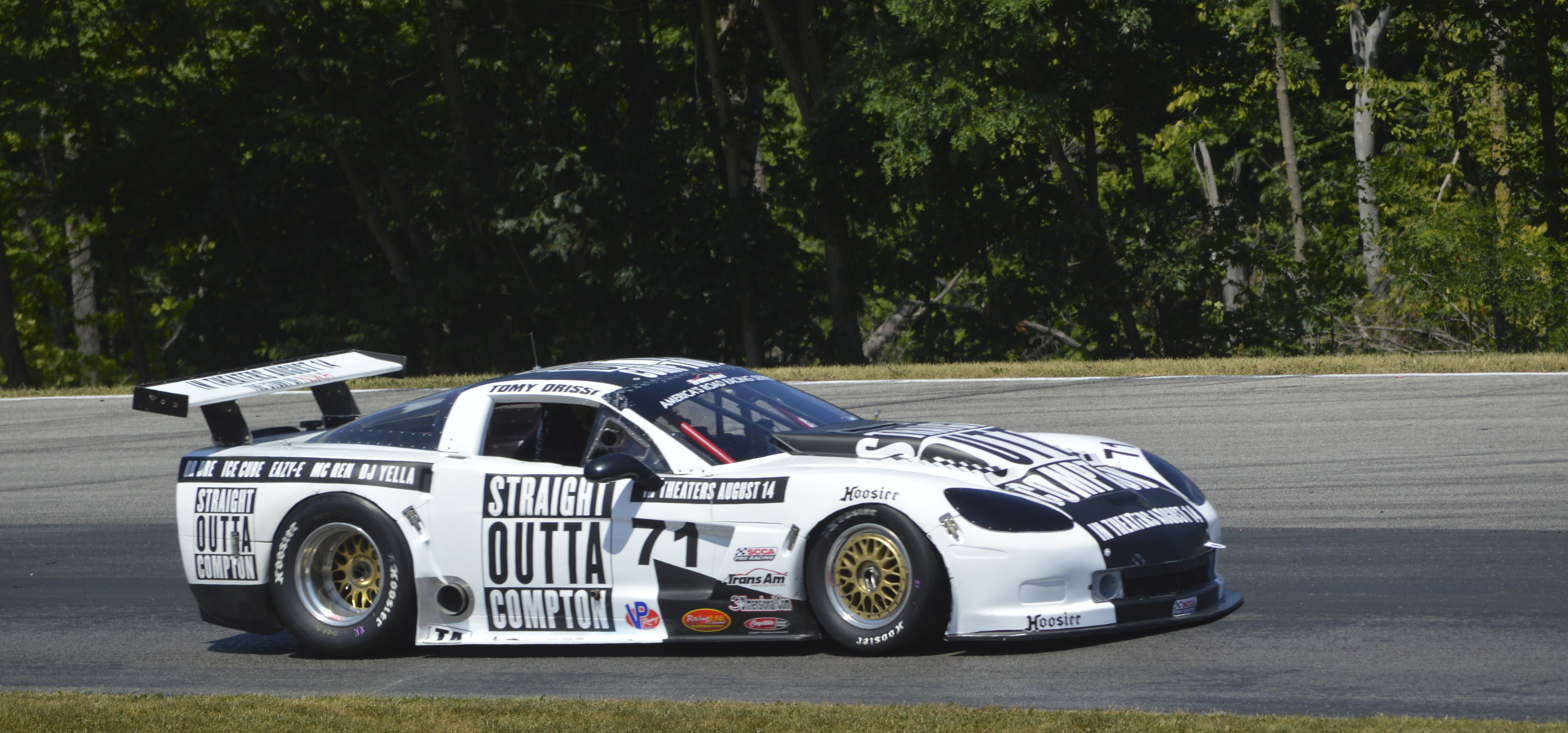
Drissi at Mid-Ohio in 2015 during the race which later had him suspended

During the race at Mid-Ohio on August 15, 2015, he started from pole position in a Tony Ave Racing machine, but lost a couple of places after battling with championship contender Amy Ruman coming out of "The Keyhole". Drissi drove aggressively towards the front, spinning out his teammate Paul Fix and was given an in-race warning by stewards.

When the caution came out he passed some cars – which he got penalized for later on in the race – and drove next to Ruman and showed his unhappiness with her by touching her car a few times lightly. After serving his drive-through penalty for avoidable contact, Drissi waited for Ruman, who was leading the race at the moment, to drive just behind him and then he tried to block her from putting him a lap down. Coming out of "The Keyhole" Ruman made the pass and Drissi purposely crashed into her and both cars went back across the track taking out himself, Ruman and Doug Peterson, one of Drissi's teammates, who was running second at the time. Drissi was assessed a match penalty, while Ruman would recover to finish in the top-20. After the race concluded, Drissi's #71 was stricken from the race results, along with his points and prize money, pending a final ruling from Trans-Am chief steward, James Foyle. The following month, Drissi was assessed the maximum suspension allowed by SCCA, which is one full calendar year. Drissi motioned to appeal, but it was upheld.

Ruman said during a post-race interview, which aired on CBS Sports Network: "Tomy Drissi is the most unprofessional, unsportsmanlike, unimaginable, worst driver in what he calls a professional sport. What he did was unacceptable today, he trashed my car, he blocked us, we were winning the championship, this is the third year in a row he's hit me, he has a vendetta against me. He's unprofessional and it's unacceptable what happened here today."

Drissi returned to Trans Am for the 2017 season, but was subsequently suspended after being involved in a physical altercation at Indianapolis Motor Speedway on June 17, 2017. On August 7, 2017, Drissi was reinstated and placed on probation after agreeing to fulfill undisclosed terms and conditions by Trans Am.

== Personal life ==
Drissi is the owner of a Hollywood advertising agency that produces film displays for promoting upcoming films in cinemas. He is of Moroccan ancestry through his father, a native of Marrakesh, earning him the nickname "The Rockin' Moroccan". He is married to Lacy Livingston Drissi and they have two children.

== Motorsports career results ==
=== WeatherTech SportsCar Championship results ===
(key)(Races in bold indicate pole position. Races in italics indicate fastest race lap in class. Results are overall/class)

Year	Team	Class	Make	Engine	1	2	3	4	5	6	7	8	9	10	11	12	Rank	Points	Ref
2014	Performance Tech Motorsports	PC	Oreca FLM09	Chevrolet LS3 6.2 L V8	DAY; 3†		LGA	KAN		IMS	ELK	VIR	AUS				19th	77	
2014	BAR1 Motorsports	PC	Oreca FLM09	Chevrolet LS3 6.2 L V8		SIR; 6								ATL; 8			19th	77	
2014	JDC-Miller MotorSports	PC	Oreca FLM09	Chevrolet LS3 6.2 L V8					WGI; 6								19th	77	
2014	Mühlner Motorsports America	GTD	Porsche 911 GT America	Porsche 4.0L Flat-6				DET; 7									83rd	20	
2015	BAR1 Motorsports	PC	Oreca FLM09	Chevrolet LS3 6.2 L V8	DAY; 8	SEB; 7†	LGA	DET	WGI	MOS	LRP	ELK	AUS	ATL; 3			26th	33	
2016	BAR1 Motorsports	PC	Oreca FLM09	Chevrolet LS3 6.2 L V8	DAY; 3	SIR	LBC; 4	LGA	DET; 5	WGI	MOS	LRP	ELK	AUS	ATL; 5		14th	114	
2017	BAR1 Motorsports	PC	Oreca FLM09	Chevrolet LS3 6.2 L V8	DAY	SEB	AUS	DET; 2	WAT	MOS	ELK	PET; 1					10th	67	

=== NASCAR ===
(key) (Bold – Pole position awarded by qualifying time. Italics – Pole position earned by points standings or practice time. * – Most laps led.)

==== Cup Series ====
NASCAR Cup Series results
Year	Team	No.	Make	1	2	3	4	5	6	7	8	9	10	11	12	13	14	15	16	17	18	19	20	21	22	23	24	25	26	27	28	29	30	31	32	33	34	35	36	MENCC	Pts	Ref
2012	Tommy Baldwin Racing	10	Chevy	DAY	PHO	LVS	BRI	CAL	MAR	TEX	KAN	RCH	TAL	DAR	CLT	DOV	POC	MCH	SON; 38	KEN	DAY	NHA	IND	POC	GLN	MCH	BRI	ATL	RCH	CHI	NHA	DOV	TAL	CLT	KAN	MAR	TEX	PHO	HOM	55th	6	
2013	NEMCO-Jay Robinson Racing	87	Toyota	DAY	PHO	LVS	BRI	CAL	MAR	TEX	KAN	RCH	TAL	DAR	CLT	DOV	POC	MCH	SON; 38	KEN	DAY	NHA	IND	POC	GLN; 42	MCH	BRI	ATL	RCH	CHI	NHA	DOV	KAN	CLT	TAL	MAR	TEX	PHO	HOM	50th	8	
2014	Identity Ventures Racing	66	Toyota	DAY	PHO	LVS	BRI	CAL	MAR	TEX	DAR	RCH	TAL	KAN	CLT	DOV	POC	MCH	SON; 38	KEN	DAY	NHA	IND	POC	GLN	MCH	BRI	ATL	RCH	CHI	NHA	DOV	KAN	CLT	TAL	MAR	TEX	PHO	HOM	55th	6	
2018	StarCom Racing	00	Chevy	DAY	ATL	LVS	PHO	CAL	MAR	TEX	BRI	RCH	TAL	DOV	KAN	CLT	POC	MCH	SON; 32	CHI	DAY	KEN	NHA	POC	GLN	MCH	BRI	DAR	IND	LVS	RCH	CLT	DOV	TAL	KAN	MAR	TEX	PHO	HOM	46th	5	

==== Xfinity Series ====
NASCAR Xfinity Series results
Year	Team	No.	Make	1	2	3	4	5	6	7	8	9	10	11	12	13	14	15	16	17	18	19	20	21	22	23	24	25	26	27	28	29	30	31	32	33	34	35	NXSC	Pts	Ref
2010	MacDonald Motorsports	82	Dodge	DAY	CAL	LVS	BRI	NSH	PHO	TEX	TAL	RCH	DAR	DOV	CLT	NSH	KEN	ROA	NHA	DAY	CHI	GTY	IRP	IOW	GLN	MCH	BRI	CGV; 18	ATL	RCH	DOV	KAN	CAL	CLT	GTY	TEX	PHO	HOM	111th	109	
2011	Rick Ware Racing	41	Ford	DAY	PHO	LVS	BRI	CAL	TEX	TAL	NSH	RCH	DAR	DOV	IOW	CLT	CHI	MCH	ROA	DAY	KEN	NHA	NSH	IRP	IOW	GLN; DNQ	CGV; DNQ												126th	0^{1}	
2011	Rick Ware Racing	75	Ford																							GLN; 27	CGV; 34	BRI	ATL	RCH	CHI	DOV	KAN	CLT	TEX	PHO	HOM		126th	0^{1}	
2013	NEMCO-Jay Robinson Racing	70	Toyota	DAY	PHO	LVS	BRI	CAL	TEX	RCH	TAL	DAR	CLT	DOV	IOW	MCH	ROA	KEN	DAY	NHA	CHI	IND	IOW	GLN	MOH; 19	BRI	ATL	RCH	CHI	KEN	DOV	KAN	CLT	TEX	PHO	HOM			117th	0^{1}	
2014	JGL Racing	93	Dodge	DAY	PHO	LVS	BRI	CAL	TEX	DAR	RCH	TAL	IOW	CLT	DOV	MCH	ROA	KEN	DAY	NHA	CHI	IND	IOW	GLN; 20	MOH; 23	BRI	ATL	RCH	CHI	KEN	DOV	KAN	CLT	TEX	PHO	HOM			109th	0^{1}	
2015	JGL Racing	26	Toyota	DAY	ATL	LVS	PHO	CAL	TEX	BRI	RCH	TAL	IOW	CLT	DOV	MCH	CHI	DAY	KEN	NHA	IND	IOW	GLN; 25	MOH; 32	BRI	ROA; 36	DAR	RCH	CHI	KEN	DOV	CLT	KAN	TEX	PHO	HOM			57th	39	
2016	TriStar Motorsports	14	Toyota	DAY	ATL	LVS	PHO	CAL	TEX	BRI	RCH	TAL	DOV	CLT	POC	MCH	IOW	DAY	KEN	NHA	IND	IOW	GLN; 36	MOH	BRI	ROA; 26	DAR	RCH	CHI	KEN	DOV	CLT	KAN	TEX	PHO	HOM			64th	20	

^{*} Season still in progress
^{1} Ineligible for series points

Sporting positions
Preceded by Klaus Graf (2005)	SCCA Trans-Am Series Champion; 2009	Succeeded by Tony Ave
