= Detroit Grand Prix (IndyCar) =

IndyCar Series race in Detroit, Michigan

- Location: Detroit Street Circuit; Detroit, Michigan, U.S. 42°19′47.1″N 83°2′24.4″W
- Corporate sponsor: Lear Corporation; Chevrolet
- First race: 1982
- Distance: 164.5 miles (264.737 km)
- Laps: 100
- Most wins (driver): Scott Dixon (4)
- Most wins (team): Penske Racing (9)
- Most wins (manufacturer): Chassis: Dallara (24); Engine: Honda (20)

Circuit information
- Surface: Asphalt/Concrete
- Length: 1.645 mi (2.647 km)
- Turns: 9

The Detroit Grand Prix (branded as the Chevrolet Detroit Grand Prix presented by Lear Corporation for sponsorship reasons) is an IndyCar Series race weekend held on a temporary circuit in Detroit, Michigan. The race has been held from 1989 to 2001, 2007 to 2008, 2012 to 2019, and since 2021. Since 2012, the event has been scheduled for the weekend immediately following the Indianapolis 500.

The origins of the event date back to the Formula One Detroit Grand Prix on the Detroit Street Circuit. The CART series began headlining the event in 1989, and in 1992, the race moved from downtown Detroit to Belle Isle, a park situated on an island in the Detroit River, which is the longest serving venue of the race. The IndyCar Series took over the race beginning in 2007. The race has been supported by Indy Lights and Formula Atlantic and top-level sports car series such as the Trans-Am Series and the ALMS. From 2023, the race returned to the downtown streets around the Renaissance Center using a circuit partially based on the original one used by Formula One and CART.

Open wheel racing in Detroit dates back to the 1920s to 1950s, when AAA held the Detroit 100 at the Michigan State Fairgrounds Speedway. AAA also held one five-mile (8 km), non-championship race at Grosse Pointe in 1905.

== Formula One ==
The race dates back to 1982 when it was a Formula One World Championship event held on the Detroit Street Circuit encompassing the Renaissance Center. The original circuit was 2.493 mi (4.012 km) with seventeen corners and proved to be even slower than Monaco. The rough, demanding course included a railroad track crossing and mimicked Monaco, with a tunnel on the main straight. While officially the Detroit Grand Prix, it was also referred to as the United States Grand Prix East because there were multiple Grand Prix races in the U.S. at the time. By the time of the 1988 race, the FIA, the governing body of Formula One, had declared the street circuit's temporary pits and garages were not up to the required standard. The race was already the least popular Grand Prix on the calendar and after a very difficult 1988 Grand Prix the drivers became outspoken with their dislike of the event.

For 1989, race organizers planned to move the race to a new temporary circuit on Belle Isle, a city park in the Detroit River. Along with the criticism of the downtown circuit, local developers were also planning to begin construction along portions of the course, making it difficult to set up in the coming years. The relocation plan to Belle Isle was immediately met with stiff local opposition, both public and political. Even though the circuit would be temporary, permanent garages and pit facilities would have needed to be constructed, at significant expense, and at the odds of conservation groups. Also against their favor was a budding interest to relocate the United States Grand Prix to Laguna Seca. That track was courting Formula One, having recently completed capital improvements, and having just hosted a highly successful United States motorcycle Grand Prix. Furthermore, an upstart group in Phoenix was also aggressively vying for the race.

In October 1988, the plan to move to Belle Isle was scrapped. Formula One left Detroit permanently, and a short time later, it was officially announced that the U.S. Grand Prix was moving to Phoenix.

It was in Detroit in 1983 that Italian driver Michele Alboreto drove his Tyrrell 011 to victory in the US Grand Prix East in what would prove to be the 155th and last ever F1 win by the Cosworth DFV V8 engine.

== CART ==
=== Renaissance Center: 1989 to 1991 ===
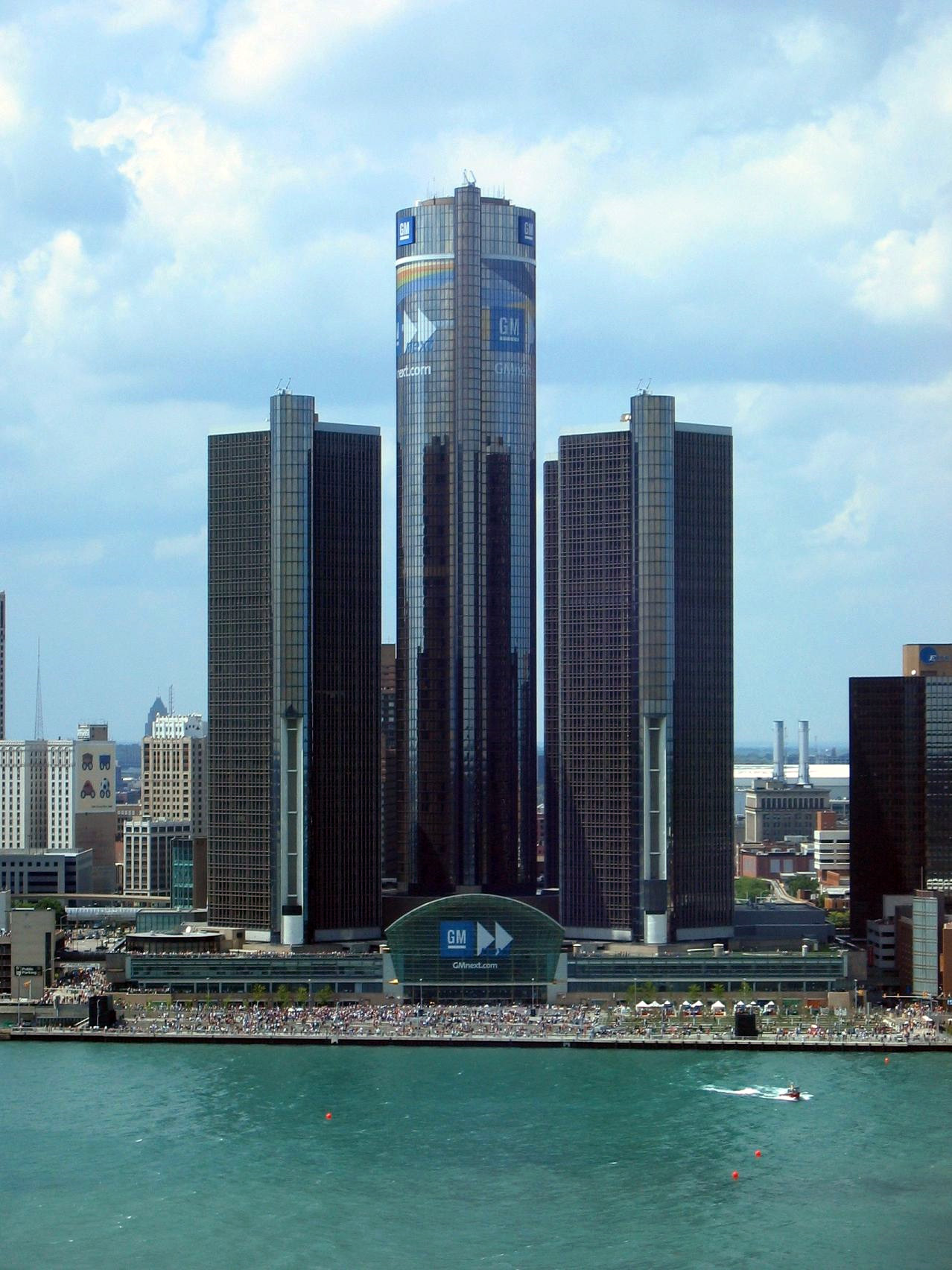
The Renaissance Center in downtown Detroit.

For 1989, the race in Detroit was replaced by a CART series event. Instead of moving to Belle Isle, CART utilized a slightly modified version of the existing downtown Renaissance Center street circuit. The chicane on the main straight was eliminated – something the F1 drivers had been calling for since the first race in 1982. The CART race was held on this 2.52-mile (4.06 km) layout for three years. As had been the case in the event's Formula One days, competitors and fans continued to pan the course, criticizing it for its bumpiness, poor visibility and overall poor layout.

The 1991 event was perhaps the last straw in what was an embarrassment for the organizers. In addition to a disintegrating track made worse by suffocating heat and humidity, it saw Mario Andretti crash his Lola head-on into a tow truck. The safety crew was attempting to remove Dennis Vitolo's stalled car from a blind corner at St. Antoine and East Jefferson Streets. Seconds later Michael Andretti came onto the scene, and crashed into Vitolo's car attempting to avoid his father's wrecked car. Ultimately, promoters considered the downtown circuit a money-loser, and claimed it was suffering from poor television ratings with its Father's Day date (up against the U.S. Open).

=== Belle Isle: 1992 to 1997 ===
Beginning in 1992, the race was moved to a new temporary course set up on Belle Isle. The move revived a conceptual plan for the Formula One event from four years earlier. One major difference that made Belle Isle viable for CART – and acceptable to locals – was that permanent Formula One style garages and pits were not required by the sanctioning body. The race was also moved up a week, and for 1992, was the first race after the Indianapolis 500 (displacing the traditional Milwaukee Mile). The first layout measured 2.1 miles (3.4 km). Almost immediately, the new course was criticized by drivers for being narrow, slow, and lacking passing zones. It was complemented, however, for its smoothness - a sharp contrast to the rough, manhole-dotted downtown circuit. Fans' opinions were mixed, as sightlines were improved over the downtown circuit, but access to the island was difficult, and the racing was not much better.

=== Course modification: 1998 to 2000 ===
In 1998, the course layout was modified to eliminate the slow "Picnic Way" segment and series of corners. Instead, the course continued straight along Central Avenue to create a long, fairly-wide straightaway leading into a competitive passing zone. The track then measured 2.346 miles (3.776 km). The revised layout was praised by competitors as being an improvement over the original (1992–1997) course. However, pavement transitions from asphalt to concrete were being blamed for an increase in incidents due to slickness.

The 2000 event saw young Brazilian Hélio Castroneves score his first CART victory for Marlboro Team Penske. After his victory lap, he stopped on the front stretch and climbed the catch fencing in an apparent effort to share his joy with the spectators. Helio became known as "Spider-Man" because of this celebration, which he repeated in his later victories.

Support races for the Detroit Grand Prix included the Motor City 100 for the SCCA Trans-Am Series, and the Neon Challenge celebrity race. Scenes from the film Driven were filmed during the race weekend in 2000.

The event, along with the Michigan 500, provided two CART races in southern Michigan annually.

=== Demise: 2001 ===
Even though the track was a temporary street course, it became known as The Raceway on Belle Isle. As the years went by, the track was increasingly criticized for its narrowness, poor access, and its overall uncompetitive nature. The once smooth surface was aging in the harsh Detroit winters, and along with it came bumps, cracks and potholes. The circuit gained a reputation of being the "worst" and "least popular" venue on the entire schedule. In 1997, it was noted that race winner Greg Moore started seventh and did not pass a single car competitively out on the track for position all day. Participants also disliked the facility because of its lack of paved areas for support activities. Paddock areas were often muddy and unable to accommodate the teams.

After the 2001 race, CART's contract with Belle Isle expired. Attendance had been noticeably slipping. Negotiations to continue the event went over the summer, but eventually stalled. Organizers briefly entertained an idea to return to the old downtown circuit, but those plans were quickly scuttled. The series chose to drop the race from the schedule and the event went on hiatus.

== IndyCar ==
=== 2007 to 2008 ===
In 2006, Roger Penske spearheaded talks to revive the race for 2007 as part of the ALMS and IndyCar Series schedules. Penske had recently experienced tremendous success as head of the Super Bowl XL Detroit Metro Host Committee. On September 29, 2006, it was announced that the Detroit Indy Grand Prix would return as the tenth race of the ALMS's 12-race season and penultimate race of the IndyCar Series' seventeen-race schedule.

To improve access to the track, a park-and-ride system, similar to what was used at Super Bowl XL, was implemented. Further paddock and track work was completed before the race. The 2007 event attracted a strong crowd, and was considered a success. It was held again in 2008. During this period, the event utilized the original (1992–1997) course layout, with some minor improvements. Some of the barriers were moved back, particularly inside the apexes of some of the turns, to effectively widen some curves and improve sight lines. Some barriers, including the metal guardrail on the pit straight, had been entirely removed.

On December 18, 2008, the scheduled race for 2009 was canceled. The ongoing automotive economic crisis, and its impact on the Detroit-area was the primary reason. Roger Penske did not rule out a return in the future.

=== Doubleheader era ===
For the 2012 season, the race on Belle Isle was revived for a second time. The event was situated on the weekend immediately after the Indianapolis 500. Starting in 2013, the race was hosted as a unique "doubleheader" weekend. The race weekend would consist of two separate, points-paying races, one each on Saturday and Sunday. The races were treated as separate events, with separate qualifying, full championship points, and the results of the first had no bearing on the lineup for the second (as had been the case with some previous "twin" race formats). Beginning in 2013, the race also returned to the more popular and more competitive "long" course (1998–2001 layout).

On April 6, 2020, IndyCar announced the cancellation of the 2020 edition due to the COVID-19 pandemic. Organizers stated that Michigan's stay-at-home order (which was extended through April 30) would hinder the necessary preparations to hold the race, and that the race could not be reasonably rescheduled due to other events having been booked on Belle Isle already. The race returned in its traditional double header format for 2021. On September 19, 2021, IndyCar announced that the Detroit Grand Prix would be altered from a two race weekend to a single race weekend as part of their 2022 schedule.

=== Downtown revival ===
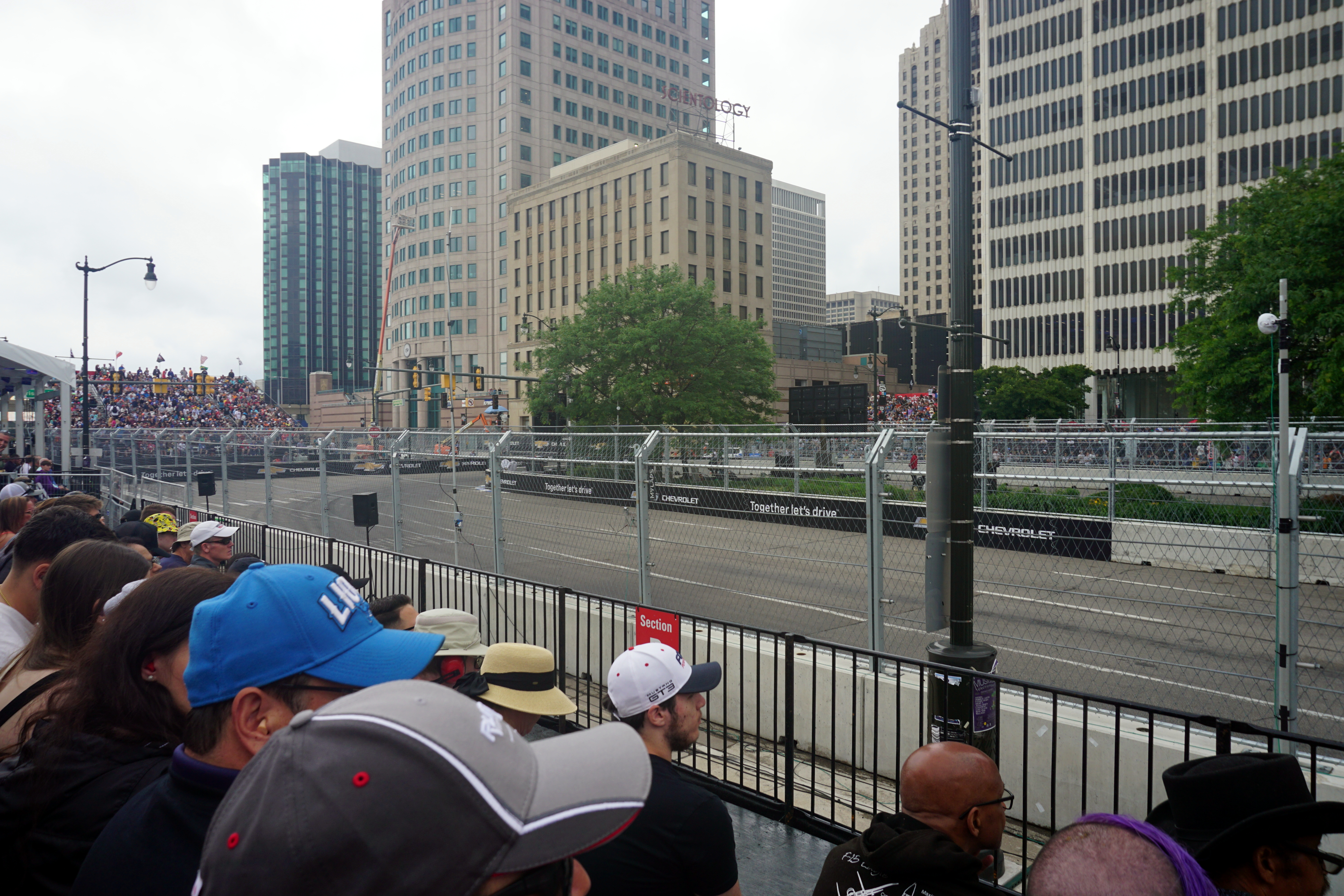
2024 Chevrolet Detroit Grand Prix

Mere weeks after the 2022 IndyCar schedule was announced, Penske Entertainment Group revealed that altering the Detroit Grand Prix to a single race weekend was done as part of a proposal discussed with the city of Detroit to return the race back to the Renaissance Center, utilizing a new downtown circuit beginning in 2023. In November 2021, the City Council of Detroit unanimously approved Penske Entertainment's plan and announced an initial three-year contract to return the Detroit Grand Prix back to the downtown streets for a single race weekend beginning in 2023.

The new downtown circuit is based on lessons learned from the Nashville Street Circuit. It is designed to be less disruptive to city traffic while also being more accessible to spectators and having more points of visibility to the racing than the old Detroit Street Circuit. The new circuit features ten corners and is 1.645 mi (2.647 km) in length compared to the 2.500 mi (4.023 km) circuit used by Formula One and CART and the 2.360 mi (3.798 km) Raceway at Belle Isle Park. It travels from the start/finish line on Atwater Street and heads onto Schwarzer Street, Franklin Street, and Rivard Street in the first series of corners. From Rivard Street drivers make a sharp left turn onto the circuit's most prominent feature, a 0.7 mile straightaway down East Jefferson Avenue. This straightaway is the longest straightaway on an IndyCar street circuit. The circuit then turns onto Bates Street before heading back onto Atwater Street. The only part of the old Detroit Street Circuit used on the new circuit is the old circuit's 16th and 17th corners that were then known as The Ford Corner. On the new circuit this section includes the 8th and 9th corners. Neither of the tunnels nor side streets used on the old Detroit Street Circuit are used on the new circuit to minimize impact on local businesses and city traffic around downtown Detroit. To increase spectator viewership IndyCar and Penske Entertainment offer free viewership at multiple points along the circuit. In 2021, the Detroit City Council stated the entire circuit would be fully resurfaced before the race.

== Past winners ==
=== CART / Indy Racing League / IndyCar Series ===
CART
Season	Date	Driver	Team	Chassis	Engine	Race Distance		Race Time	Average Speed	Report
Season	Date	Driver	Team	Chassis	Engine	Laps	Miles (km)	Race Time	Average Speed	Report
1989	June 18	(Brazil) Emerson Fittipaldi	Patrick Racing	Penske PC-18 (1)	Chevrolet (1)	62	155 (249.448)	2:02:11	76.112 mph (122.490 km/h)	Report
1990	June 17	(United States) Michael Andretti	Newman/Haas Racing	Lola T90/00 (1)	Chevrolet (2)	62	155 (249.448)	1:49:32	84.902 mph (136.637 km/h)	Report
1991	June 16	(Brazil) Emerson Fittipaldi (2)	Penske Racing	Penske PC-20 (2)	Chevrolet (3)	62	156.24 (251.443)	1:57:19	79.455 mph (127.870 km/h)	Report
1992	June 7	(United States) Bobby Rahal	Rahal/Hogan Racing	Lola T92/00 (2)	Chevrolet (4)	77	161.7 (260.23)	1:58:20	81.989 mph (131.949 km/h)	Report
1993	June 13	(United States) Danny Sullivan	Galles Racing	Lola T93/00 (3)	Chevrolet (5)	77	161.7 (260.23)	1:56:43	83.116 mph (133.762 km/h)	Report
1994	June 12	(Canada) Paul Tracy	Penske Racing (2)	Penske PC-23 (3)	Ilmor (1)	77	161.7 (260.23)	1:52:29	86.245 mph (138.798 km/h)	Report
1995	June 11	(United States) Robby Gordon	Walker Racing	Reynard 95I (1)	Ford (1)	77	161.7 (260.23)	1:56:11	83.499 mph (134.379 km/h)	Report
1996	June 9	(United States) Michael Andretti (2)	Newman/Haas Racing (2)	Lola T96/00 (4)	Ford (2)	72*	151.2 (243.332)	2:00:44	75.136 mph (120.920 km/h)	Report
1997	June 8	(Canada) Greg Moore	Forsythe Racing	Reynard 97I (2)	Mercedes (2)	77	161.7 (260.23)	1:52:45	86.047 mph (138.479 km/h)	Report
1998	June 7	(Italy) Alex Zanardi	Chip Ganassi Racing	Reynard 98I (3)	Honda (1)	72	168.912 (271.837)	1:41:17	100.052 mph (161.018 km/h)	Report
1999	August 8	(United Kingdom) Dario Franchitti	Team Green	Reynard 99I (4)	Honda (2)	71	166.566 (268.061)	2:02:24	81.643 mph (131.392 km/h)	Report
2000	June 18	(Brazil) Hélio Castroneves	Penske Racing (3)	Reynard (5)	Honda (3)	84	197.064 (317.143)	2:01:23	97.401 mph (156.752 km/h)	Report
2001	June 17	(Brazil) Hélio Castroneves (2)	Penske Racing (4)	Reynard (6)	Honda (4)	72	168.912 (271.837)	1:53:51	89.008 mph (143.244 km/h)	Report
2002 – 2006	Not held									
Indy Racing League / IndyCar Series
2007	September 2	(Brazil) Tony Kanaan	Andretti Green Racing	Dallara (1)	Honda (5)	89*	186.544 (300.213)	2:11:51	83.841 mph (134.929 km/h)	Report
2008	August 31	(United Kingdom) Justin Wilson	Newman/Haas/Lanigan Racing (3)	Dallara (2)	Honda (6)	87*	182.352 (293.467)	2:00:11	89.911 mph (144.698 km/h)	Report
2009 – 2011	Not held									
2012	June 3	(New Zealand) Scott Dixon	Chip Ganassi Racing (2)	Dallara (3)	Honda (7)	60*	124.2 (199.88)	1:27:40	85.012 mph (136.814 km/h)	Report
2013	June 1	(United Kingdom) Mike Conway	Dale Coyne Racing	Dallara (4)	Honda (8)	70	164.22 (264.286)	1:48:45	90.753 mph (146.053 km/h)	Report
2013	June 2	(France) Simon Pagenaud	Schmidt Peterson Hamilton HP Motorsports	Dallara (5)	Honda (9)	70	164.22 (264.286)	1:56:15	84.906 mph (136.643 km/h)	Report
2014	May 31	(Australia) Will Power	Team Penske (5)	Dallara (6)	Chevrolet (6)	70	164.22 (264.286)	1:49:30	90.138 mph (145.063 km/h)	Report
2014	June 1	(Brazil) Hélio Castroneves (3)	Team Penske (6)	Dallara (7)	Chevrolet (7)	70	164.22 (264.286)	1:45:53	93.211 mph (150.009 km/h)	Report
2015	May 30	(Colombia) Carlos Muñoz	Andretti Autosport (2)	Dallara (8)	Honda (10)	47*	110.45 (177.752)	1:27:46	75.51 mph (121.52 km/h)	Report
2015	May 31	(France) Sébastien Bourdais	KV Racing Technology	Dallara (9)	Chevrolet (8)	68*	159.8 (257.173)	2:00:38	79.476 mph (127.904 km/h)	Report
2016	June 4	(France) Sébastien Bourdais (2)	KVSH Racing (2)	Dallara (10)	Chevrolet (9)	70	164.5 (264.737)	1:40:52	97.857 mph (157.486 km/h)	Report
2016	June 5	(Australia) Will Power (2)	Team Penske (7)	Dallara (11)	Chevrolet (10)	70	164.5 (264.737)	1:42:22	96.414 mph (155.163 km/h)	Report
2017	June 3	(United States) Graham Rahal	Rahal Letterman Lanigan Racing (2)	Dallara (12)	Honda (11)	70	164.5 (264.737)	1:35:49	103.015 mph (165.787 km/h)	Report
2017	June 4	(United States) Graham Rahal (2)	Rahal Letterman Lanigan Racing (3)	Dallara (13)	Honda (12)	70	164.5 (264.737)	1:33:36	105.442 mph (169.692 km/h)	Report
2018	June 2	(New Zealand) Scott Dixon (2)	Chip Ganassi Racing (3)	Dallara (14)	Honda (13)	70	164.5 (264.737)	1:39:24	99.285 mph (159.784 km/h)	Report
2018	June 3	(United States) Ryan Hunter-Reay	Andretti Autosport (3)	Dallara (15)	Honda (14)	70	164.5 (264.737)	1:33:51	105.176 mph (169.264 km/h)	Report
2019	June 1	(United States) Josef Newgarden	Team Penske (8)	Dallara (16)	Chevrolet (11)	43	101.05 (162.624)	1:15:30.59	80.294 mph (129.221 km/h)	Report
2019	June 2	(New Zealand) Scott Dixon (3)	Chip Ganassi Racing (4)	Dallara (17)	Honda (15)	70	164.5 (264.737)	1:52:18.9365	87.877 mph (141.424 km/h)	Report
2020	Canceled due to the COVID-19 pandemic									
2021	June 12	(Sweden) Marcus Ericsson	Chip Ganassi Racing (5)	Dallara (18)	Honda (16)	70	164.5 (264.737)	1:45:33.1123	93.509 mph (150.488 km/h)	Report
2021	June 13	(Mexico) Patricio O'Ward	Arrow McLaren SP	Dallara (19)	Chevrolet (12)	70	164.5 (264.737)	1:41:30.8814	97.227 mph (156.472 km/h)	Report
2022	June 5	(Australia) Will Power (3)	Team Penske (9)	Dallara (20)	Chevrolet (13)	70	164.5 (264.737)	1:32:08.8183	107.111 mph (172.378 km/h)	Report
2023	June 4	(Spain) Álex Palou	Chip Ganassi Racing (6)	Dallara (21)	Honda (17)	100	164.5 (264.737)	2:01:58.1171	80.922 mph (130.231 km/h)	Report
2024	June 2	(New Zealand) Scott Dixon (4)	Chip Ganassi Racing (7)	Dallara (22)	Honda (18)	100	164.5 (264.737)	2:06:07.9684	78.251 mph (125.933 km/h)	Report
2025	June 1	(United States) Kyle Kirkwood	Andretti Global (4)	Dallara (23)	Honda (19)	100	164.5 (264.737)	2:00:20.0264	82.022 mph (132.002 km/h)	Report
2026	May 31	(Spain) Álex Palou (2)	Chip Ganassi Racing (8)	Dallara (24)	Honda (20)	100	164.5 (264.737)	1:59:08.5542	82.842 mph (133.321 km/h)	Report

- 1996, 2007, 2008, & 2015 II: Races shortened due to 2 hour time limit.
- 2012: Race shortened due to darkness after 2 hour suspension for track repairs.
- 2015 I: Race shortened due to lightning policy.
- 2019 I: Race shortened to 75 minute time limit due to lightning policy delaying the start.

=== Race summaries ===
==== CART PPG Indy Car World Series (Renaissance Center) ====
Downtown Renaissance Center Street Circuit (1989–1991).

- 1989: Emerson Fittipaldi touched wheels with Mario Andretti on lap 2, puncturing a tire and sending him to the back of the field. But Fittipaldi charged from 27th position to second place in the closing laps. Polesitter Michael Andretti led 52 of the first 54 laps, but a radio wire became tangled in the throttle pedal. On lap 55, the throttle pedal stuck sending Andretti into a barrier. Scott Pruett was now leading the race by 17 seconds, but was forced to back off to conserve fuel. Fittipaldi blew by Pruett with four laps to go to take the victory.
- 1990: Michael Andretti started from the pole position and led wire-to-wire, winning the race in dominating fashion. Danny Sullivan was running close behind in second place on lap 46 when during his final pit stop, an impact wrench failed. The wheel was not properly fastened, and on the out-lap, the drive pegs on the wheel broke, putting him out of the race. Bobby Rahal nursing brakes, finished second, over one minute and 48 seconds behind Andretti. Rahal held off Emerson Fittipaldi who finished close behind in third.
- 1991: Emerson Fittipaldi, expecting the birth of his fifth child, was leading Bobby Rahal in the closing laps when gearbox problems arose. With seven laps to go, Fittipaldi's car kept jumping out of gear. He was mostly forced to hold the gearshift lever to hold the car in gear with his right hand, and steer with only his left hand, on the rough, bumpy, demanding circuit. Rahal charged hard, but Fittipaldi held him off for the victory by 0.29 seconds. The race is best-remembered for a bizarre incident involving Mario and Michael Andretti. On lap 48, Dennis Vitolo stalled in turn four with a seized transmission. Safety crew tended to Vitolo's car, hooking up a tow rope. Mario Andretti came around what was a blind corner, locked up his brakes, and rammed hard into the back of the safety truck. The nose of the car was wedged underneath the truck's bumper, and the track was nearly blocked. A couple cars (including Fittipaldi) skirted by the scene, but seconds later, Michael Andretti slid and crashed into the back of Vitolo's car. The track was now completely blocked, and the red flag was put out to clean up the scene. This would be the final race held at the Renaissance Center circuit until 2023.

==== CART PPG Indy Car World Series (Belle Isle) ====
Belle Isle "original" course (1992–1997, 2007–2012).

- 1992: For 1992, the race was moved to a new circuit on Belle Isle. Michael Andretti led the early laps, with Paul Tracy (subbing for Rick Mears) and Bobby Rahal close behind. Tracy made a daring pass on lap 38 for the lead going into turn one, nearly touching wheels with Andretti. On lap 58, Tracy was leading Andretti, with Bobby Rahal in third. All three cars were nose-to-tail. Andretti attempted to pass Tracy for the lead, but this time, the two cars touched. Both Tracy and Andretti slid high and scraped the concrete wall, allowing Bobby Rahal to slip by both to take the lead. Tracy later dropped out with gearbox failure, but Andretti stayed with Rahal, despite nursing an ill-handling machine. On the second-to-last lap, Andretti spun out and dropped to fourth while Rahal cruised to victory.
- 1993: A controversial race filled with penalties from start to finish. At the green flag, Emerson Fittipaldi jumped the start from the outside of the front row, beating pole-sitter Nigel Mansell to the line by almost two car lengths. Instead of waving off the start, official assessed Fittipaldi a stop-and-go penalty. Later in the race Paul Tracy was penalized for breaking the 80 mph pit road speed limit (clocked at 93 mph), and Nigel Mansell was accused of blatant blocking. Danny Sullivan took the lead on lap 48. In the closing laps, Galles Racing teammates Sullivan and Al Unser Jr. were running 1st-2nd. On lap 69, Unser challenged Sullivan for the lead, but was forced down to the inside, and knocked down three cones. Officials charged Unser with going off-course, and assessed him a stop-and-go penalty. On a restart with four laps to go, rookie Robby Gordon driving for Foyt, tried to pass Sullivan for the lead, but was squeezed down and had to back off. Moments later, Gordon spun out with a cut tire. Danny Sullivan went on to win the race, his final win in Indy car competition.
- 1994: Penske teammates Al Unser Jr., Paul Tracy, and Emerson Fittipaldi were running 1st-2nd-3rd on a restart on lap 55. Tracy was on the back bumper of Unser, as Unser was dicing through backmarker traffic. Going into turn 8, Tracy ran into the back of Unser's car, sending him sliding head-on into a tire barrier. Tracy went on to win the race, with Fittipaldi second. Unser rejoined the field and finished 10th.
- 1995: Robby Gordon started from the pole position and led 43 of the 77 laps en route to victory. Gordon led the first eight laps, but slipped down in the standings after suffering tire wear. Gordon switched to the optional harder tire compound, and charged back to the front. He took the lead with 35 laps to go, and held off Jimmy Vasser for the win.
- 1996: Heavy rain fell in the morning, and continued to fall during the first 25 laps. Christian Fittipaldi led 64 of the first 65 laps, but a late caution came out when Bobby Rahal slid into a tire barrier. On a restart on lap 66, Michael Andretti battled Fittipaldi for the lead coming out of turn four. Fittipaldi locked up the brakes, and slid high in turn five, which allowed Andretti to drive by and take the lead. The race was shortened from 77 to 72 laps due to a two-hour time limit. Andretti became the first and only driver to win at both the downtown Renaissance Center circuit and the Belle Isle circuit.
- 1997: At the white flag, Maurício Gugelmin led Mark Blundell and Greg Moore, with all three cars running nose-to-tail. PacWest Racing teammates Gugelmin and Blundell were running very low on fuel, attempting to stretch their tanks to the finish. Gugelmin ran out of fuel on the Strand Drive backstretch, and seconds later Blundell ran out of fuel as he approached the final turn. Greg Moore slipped by to take the lead and scored the victory.

==== CART FedEx Championship Series (Belle Isle) ====
Belle Isle "long" course (1998–2001, 2013–2022)

- 1998: A slightly reconfigured layout was introduced for 1998. Several tight and slow corners were replaced with a longer straightaway, and potentially better passing zones. Alex Zanardi battled Greg Moore during the early stages of the race. Moore pitted first on lap 24, while Zanardi stayed out two additional laps. Zanardi's light fuel load, and lightning-fast in-lap, put him back out on the track ahead of Moore. Zanardi led the final 50 laps to victory, and celebrated by performing donuts on his victory lap.
- 1999: The race was moved to August to avoid a conflict with the NASCAR Michigan 400. In a race that was described as "ugly," several crashes were capped off by a bizarre finish under yellow. On the first lap, Max Papis touched wheels with Patrick Carpentier, and crashed into a tire barrier. On lap 25, Maurício Gugelmin tangled with Cristiano da Matta, and flip upside-down, landing on top of Carpentier's car. Twenty laps later, de Matta suffered a hard crash in turn two, collecting Al Unser Jr. Under caution late in the race, a fuel leak from the pace car caused a confusing delay, requiring officials to bring out a back-up pace car. With some drivers anticipating a restart, Hélio Castroneves ran into the back of Juan Pablo Montoya. The race hit the two-hour time limit, and finished under yellow with Team Kool Green drivers Dario Franchitti first, and Paul Tracy second.
- 2000: Polesitter Juan Pablo Montoya led 59 of the first 60 laps, but dropped out with a broken driveshaft. Hélio Castroneves took the lead on lap 62, and led the final 24 laps en route to his first career CART series victory. On his victory lap, Castroneves stopped his car on the frontstretch, jumped from cockpit, and climbed up the catchfence to celebrate his victory.
- 2001: Hélio Castroneves started from the pole position and led wire-to-wire to win the Detroit Grand Prix in back-to-back years. Castroneves survived a minor scare when telemetry indicated a pressure leak in his left front tire. After the victory, Castroneves once again jumped from his car and climbed the catchfence in his signature "Spiderman" celebration. This would be the final CART series race at Detroit.

==== IRL / IndyCar Series (Belle Isle) ====
- 2007: After a six-year absence, open wheel racing returned to Detroit. The Indy cars utilized the original "short" course layout, previously raced on from 1992 to 1997. After the final series of pit stops, a four-car battle at the front ensued. Tony Kanaan was leading, and second place Buddy Rice ran out of fuel. Third place Scott Dixon took evasive action to get by Rice, which crashed out both cars. The pileup collected Dario Franchitti as well. Danica Patrick slipped by the crash and took a career-best second place, while Kanaan went on to win.
- 2008: Originally scheduled for 90 laps, the race was shortened to 87 laps due to two-hour limit. Late in the race, Justin Wilson was challenging Hélio Castroneves for the lead. Officials ruled that Castroneves intentionally blocked, resulting in a penalty which allowed Wilson to take the lead. Despite a late push by Castroneves, Wilson won the race, his first-career Indy car victory. Wilson's win was the 107th and final Championship Car victory for Newman/Haas Racing, and occurred just weeks before the death of co-owner Paul Newman.
- 2012: After a three-year hiatus, the Detroit Grand Prix returned to the IndyCar calendar. For 2012, the race was moved to the weekend immediately following the Indianapolis 500. The race was shortened from 90 laps to 60 laps due to a disintegrating track. James Hinchcliffe's car dislodged a chunk of the pavement, and crashed into a tire barrier. Officials discovered other parts of the track that were damaged, and a red flag was put out to make repairs. Rain also began to fall. Scott Dixon won the race from the pole position.
- 2013 (Race 1): For 2013, the "long" course layout was revived, and the race was now part of a doubleheader weekend. During the first race on Saturday, Mike Conway started second and led 47 laps en route to victory. Conway passed Ryan Hunter-Reay for the lead on lap 44. He then built a 20-second lead before the final round of pit stops. Conway's margin of victory was 12.9707 seconds over Hunter-Reay. Dario Franchitti, who won the pole position, was issued a grid penalty for an unapproved engine change, and started 11th. He improved to sixth place at the finish, while Scott Dixon who had to pit for wing damage suffered due to contact on lap 1, charged from 24th place to 4th.
- 2013 (Race 2): On Sunday, Mike Conway started on the pole position, attempting to sweep the weekend. However, multiple cautions and different race strategies jumbled the field, and he wound up third. On lap 24, the field was coming off a restart when Tristan Vautier touched wheels with Takuma Sato, sending Sato into the tire barrier in turn 3. On lap 28, the ensuing restart saw Conway leading Scott Dixon into turn one. Seconds later, Sebastien Bourdais tagged the back of Will Power, triggering a ten-car pileup. In the second half, the race came down to Conway, Simon Pagenaud, and James Jakes. On the final sequence of pit stops, Pagenaud emerged as the leader, with Jakes second, and Conway closing in third. Pagenaud drove to victory, by 5.6274 seconds. Jakes held off Conway for second place by 0.4342 seconds.
- 2014 (Race 1): On Saturday, Will Power held off Graham Rahal during the final ten laps and scored the first Indy car win at Detroit for Chevrolet & GM since 1993. Just across the river from GM's headquarters at the Renaissance Center, Helio Castroneves started on the pole and led 30 laps. Power took the lead from Ryan Briscoe on a restart on lap 60. Rahal ran in second, less than a second behind Power. Rahal was able to keep up with Power over the final ten laps, but was unable to muster a pass for the lead. Tony Kanaan finished third, his 66th-career podium finish.
- 2014 (Race 2): On Sunday, Helio Castroneves drove to victory, completing a Penske and Chevrolet sweep of the weekend. Castroneves was leading Will Power by over 9 seconds with twenty laps to go, but a late-race caution bunched up the field. With six laps to go, Castroneves led, but another caution came out setting up one last restart. With three laps to go, Castroneves got the jump and won by 1.6836 seconds over Will Power. After the victory, Castroneves climbed the catchfence, repeating his signature celebration from the 2001 race.
- 2015: (Race 1): On Saturday, heavy rain and lightning in the area caused the race to be shortened from 70 to 47 laps. Carlos Munoz won, his first IndyCar victory.
- 2015: (Race 2): On Sunday, rain had washed out qualifying for the second race, and the field lined up by points. Several yellows slowed the race in the second half. Sébastien Bourdais was the winner.
- 2017 (Race 1): On Saturday, Graham Rahal led 55 of 70 laps to win, nearly 25 years to the day that his father Bobby won the race. Rahal held off second place Scott Dixon, who was driving despite an injured ankle from a major crash the week earlier at the Indianapolis 500.
- 2017 (Race 2): Graham Rahal swept the weekend, winning Sunday's second race, leading 41 of 70 laps. With five laps to go, the first caution of the day came out when James Hinchcliffe stalled on the course, and Spencer Pigot's car was smoking. Officials red flagged the race on lap 67 in order to allow for a green flag finish, and cleaned up the incidents. Rahal held off Josef Newgarden in a two-lap dash to finish.
- 2021 (Race 1): The new Roger Penske led IndyCar returned to Detroit after the 2020 double header was canceled due to the COVID-19 pandemic. The controversial race saw Scott Dixon take a large lead by starting the race on harder primary tires as opposed to the softer alternate tires used by the rest of the field. Dixon's strategy was upended when Arrow McLaren SP driver Felix Rosenqvist crashed at near full speed into a tire barrier, throwing a red flag that halted the race for over an hour. When the race restarted many drivers, including Dixon, broke off on the formation lap to pit for fresh tires, handing Will Power the lead as Power had pitted for his own set of tires right before the red flag. Marcus Ericsson also cycled to the front with Power based on similar strategy and challenged Power for the lead before a crash by Romain Grosjean caused another red flag to be thrown. When the formation lap on the track began Power's crew was unable to get his car to restart due to an overheated ECU, handing the lead to Ericsson who hung on for five more laps to win his first IndyCar race. Rinus VeeKay and Pato O'Ward rounded out the podium.
- 2021 (Race 2): Josef Newgarden won his first of what would be three consecutive pole positions heading into the summer break and led most of the race despite several restarts by using a strategy that put him on the harder primary tires throughout the opening two thirds of the race. Although Newgarden and Penske executed a three stop strategy perfectly it left the two time series champion to face the unforgiving Belle Isle circuit with used softer compound alternate tires that degraded rapidly in the closing laps. Following a restart where he was unable to manage the tire wear Newgarden was overtaken by Pato O'Ward, who had overtaken five other drivers in a two lap span to challenge Newgarden. The second year McLaren driver then built a gap of over five seconds to the rest of the field to take his first win on a street course. Newgarden held off late charges by Alex Palou and Colton Herta to stay in second place while Palou rounded out the podium.
- 2022: The final Detroit Grand Prix held on Belle Isle was moved from a double header to a single 70 lap race. Josef Newgarden qualified on pole but it would be his teammate Will Power who would dominate the race, charging through the field from 16th to take the lead early in the race and hanging onto it via virtue of a two stop strategy. Power's only threat on the day was Alexander Rossi, who picked up his first podium of 2022. Scott Dixon finished in third place.

==== IndyCar Series (Renaissance Center) ====
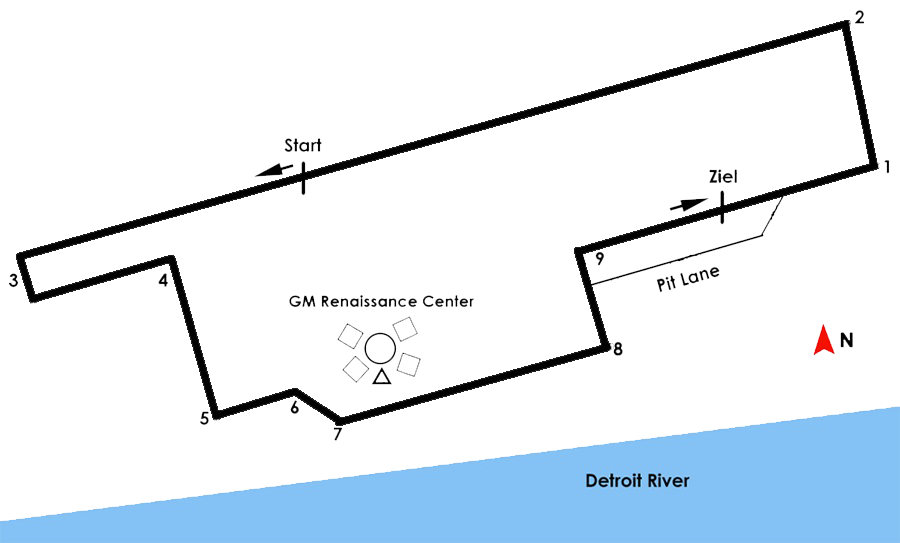
Second Renaissance Center course (2023–present)

- 2023: For 2023 the Detroit Grand Prix returned to the Renaissance Center using a brand new condensed circuit around The Renaissance Center. Alex Palou qualified on pole, his first pole position on a street circuit. Palou would lead the entire race while a fierce battle for the remaining podium spots led to Will Power finishing second and Felix Rosenqvist rounding out the podium.
- 2024: Colton Herta qualified on pole. The first caution came out on lap 1 and resulted in a six car pile up, though all drivers in the pile up were able to continue. A second caution came on lap 19 when Hélio Castroneves spun and took out rookie Kyffin Simpson. Rains arrived and the field was shuffled in a series of yellow flag pitstops, with Christian Lundgaard taking the lead in the sequence. When the rains stopped further caution periods saw Scott Dixon take the lead around lap 74. Dixon would hold on for the win despite a hard pursuit by Marcus Ericsson in the late laps. Second year driver Marcus Armstrong would finish third.
- 2025: Kyle Kirkwood took the lead from Santino Ferrucci and lap 79 and pulled away for a 3.5931 second victory. A major crash on lap 84 involving Felix Rosenqvist and Louis Foster brought out a red flag, but Kirkwood was able to get the jump on the restart and was not challenged. Ferrucci came home second, his best career finish, though he was penalized after the race for improper ballast. Indy 500 winner Alex Palou, who had won 5 of the first six races of the season, saw his first misfortune of the season. He crashed on lap 72 and placed 25th.

== Support races ==
=== Atlantics / Indy Lights / Indy NXT ===
Atlantic Championship
Season	Date	Winning driver
1983	June 5	(Mexico) Josele Garza
Indy Lights
1989	June 18	(United States) Ted Prappas
1990	June 17	(Republic of Ireland) Tommy Byrne
1991	June 16	(Belgium) Éric Bachelart
1992	June 7	(Mexico) Adrián Fernández
1993	June 13	(United Kingdom) Steve Robertson
1994	June 12	(United Kingdom) Steve Robertson
1995	June 11	(United States) Robbie Buhl
1996	June 9	(Brazil) Tony Kanaan
1997	June 8	(Brazil) Tony Kanaan
1998	June 7	(Brazil) Airton Daré
1999	August 8	(Republic of Ireland) Derek Higgins
2000	June 18	(United Kingdom) Jonny Kane
2001 – 2011	Not held	
2012	June 2	(Colombia) Gustavo Yacamán
2013 – 2020	Not held	
2021	June 12	(United States) Kyle Kirkwood
2021	June 13	(United States) Kyle Kirkwood
2022	June 4	(Sweden) Linus Lundqvist
2022	June 5	(Sweden) Linus Lundqvist
Indy NXT
2023	June 3	(United States) Reece Gold
2023	June 4	(United States) Nolan Siegel
2024	June 2	(United Kingdom) Louis Foster
2025	June 1	(Norway) Dennis Hauger
2026	May 31	(Brazil) Enzo Fittipaldi

=== AAA Contest Board ===
Grosse Pointe (dirt oval)
Season	Date	Driver	Chassis	Engine
1905	August 8	(United States) Webb Jay	White	White steam engine

=== Detroit Sports Car Classic ===
==== American Le Mans Series ====
Year	LMP1		LMP2		GT1		GT2		Results
Year	Team	Drivers	Team	Drivers	Team	Drivers	Team	Drivers	Results
2007	(United States) #2 Audi Sport North America	(Italy) Emanuele Pirro (Germany) Marco Werner	(United States) #7 Penske Racing	(Germany) Timo Bernhard (France) Romain Dumas	(United States) #3 Corvette Racing	(United States) Johnny O'Connell (Denmark) Jan Magnussen	(United States) #62 Risi Competizione	(Finland) Mika Salo (Brazil) Jaime Melo	Results
2008	(United States) #37 Intersport Racing	(United States) John Field (United States) Clint Field (United States) Richard Berry	(United States) #26 Andretti Green Racing	(France) Franck Montagny (United Kingdom) James Rossiter	(United States) #4 Corvette Racing	(Monaco) Olivier Beretta (United Kingdom) Oliver Gavin	(United States) #45 Flying Lizard Motorsports	(Germany) Jörg Bergmeister (Germany) Wolf Henzler	Results

==== Rolex Sports Car Series ====
Year	DP		GT		GX		Results
Year	Team	Drivers	Team	Drivers	Team	Drivers	Results
2012	(United States) #9 Action Express Racing	(Portugal) João Barbosa (United States) J. C. France (United States) Darren Law	(United States) #88 Autohaus Motorsports	(United States) Paul Edwards (United States) Jordan Taylor	Did not participate		Results
2013	(United States) #10 Wayne Taylor Racing	(Italy) Max Angelelli (United States) Jordan Taylor	(United States) #57 Stevenson Motorsports	(United States) John Edwards (United Kingdom) Robin Liddell	(United States) #00 Speedsource	(United States) Joel Miller (United States) Tristan Nunez	Results

==== IMSA WeatherTech SportsCar Championship ====
Year	Prototype				GT Daytona		Report
Year	Team		Drivers		Team	Drivers	Report
2014	(United States) #10 Wayne Taylor Racing		(United States) Jordan Taylor (United States) Ricky Taylor		(United States) #63 Scuderia Corsa	(Italy) Alessandro Balzan (United States) Jeff Westphal	Results
Year	Prototype		Prototype Challenge		GT Daytona		Report
Year	Team	Drivers	Team	Drivers	Team	Drivers	Report
2015	(United States) #31 Action Express Racing	(United States) Dane Cameron (United States) Eric Curran	(United States) #8 Starworks Motorsport	(Netherlands) Renger van der Zande (Germany) Mirco Schultis	(United States) #23 Team Seattle / Alex Job Racing	(United Kingdom) Ian James (Germany) Mario Farnbacher	Results
2016	(United States) #10 Wayne Taylor Racing	(United States) Jordan Taylor (United States) Ricky Taylor	(United States) #8 Starworks Motorsport	(Netherlands) Renger van der Zande (Venezuela) Alex Popow	(United States) #33 Riley Motorsports	(Netherlands) Jeroen Bleekemolen (United States) Ben Keating	Results
2017	(United States) #10 Wayne Taylor Racing	(United States) Jordan Taylor (United States) Ricky Taylor	(United States) #38 Performance Tech Motorsports	(United States) James French (Mexico) Patricio O'Ward	(United States) #93 Michael Shank Racing	(United States) Andy Lally (United Kingdom) Katherine Legge	Results
Year	Prototype				GT Daytona		Report
Year	Team		Drivers		Team	Drivers	Report
2018	(United States) #31 Whelen Engineering Racing		(United States) Eric Curran (Brazil) Felipe Nasr		(United States) #86 Meyer Shank Racing with Curb-Agajanian	(Germany) Mario Farnbacher (United Kingdom) Katherine Legge	Results
Year	Daytona Prototype international				GT Daytona		Report
Year	Team		Drivers		Team	Drivers	Report
2019	(United States) #6 Acura Team Penske		(United States) Dane Cameron (Colombia) Juan Pablo Montoya		(United States) #14 AIM Vasser Sullivan	(United Kingdom) Jack Hawksworth (United States) Richard Heistand	Results
2020	Canceled due to the COVID-19 pandemic						
2021	(United States) #01 Cadillac Chip Ganassi Racing		(Denmark) Kevin Magnussen (Netherlands) Renger van der Zande		(United States) #23 Heart of Racing Team (United States) #4 Corvette Racing	(Canada) Roman De Angelis (United Kingdom) Ross Gunn (United States) Tommy Milner (United Kingdom) Nick Tandy	Results
Year	Daytona Prototype international				GT Daytona		Report
Year	Team		Drivers		Team	Drivers	Report
2022	(United States) #01 Cadillac Racing		(France) Sébastien Bourdais (Netherlands) Renger van der Zande		(United States) #17 Vasser Sullivan Racing	(United Kingdom) Ben Barnicoat (United States) Kyle Kirkwood	Results
Year	Grand Touring Prototype				GT Daytona Pro		Report
Year	Team		Drivers		Team	Drivers	Report
2024	(United States) #10 Wayne Taylor Racing with Andretti		(United States) Ricky Taylor (Portugal) Filipe Albuquerque		(United States) #77 AO Racing	(Germany) Laurin Heinrich (United Kingdom) Sebastian Priaulx	Results
2025	(United States) #93 Acura Meyer Shank Racing w/ Curb-Agajanian		(United Kingdom) Nick Yelloly (Netherlands) Renger van der Zande		(Canada) #64 Ford Multimatic Motorsports	(United Kingdom) Sebastian Priaulx (Germany) Mike Rockenfeller	Results
2026	(United States) #31 Cadillac Whelen		(United Kingdom) Jack Aitken (New Zealand) Earl Bamber		(United States) #3 Corvette Racing by Pratt Miller Motorsports	(Spain) Antonio García (United Kingdom) Alexander Sims	Results

=== IMSA Michelin Pilot Challenge ===
Year	GS Winning Drivers	GS Winning Car
2023	(Canada) Daniel Morad (United States) Bryce Ward	Mercedes-AMG GT4

=== Stadium Super Trucks ===
Year	Date	Driver	Ref
2014	May 30	(Venezuela) E. J. Viso	
2014	May 31	(Venezuela) E. J. Viso	
2014	June 1	(Venezuela) E. J. Viso	
2015	May 29	(United States) Robby Gordon	
2015	May 30	(Venezuela) E. J. Viso	
2015	May 31	(United States) Burt Jenner	
2016	June 3	(Australia) Matthew Brabham	
2016	June 4	Abandoned ^{A}	
2016	June 5	(Australia) Matthew Brabham	
2017	June 3	(United States) Sheldon Creed	
2017	June 4	(United States) Sheldon Creed	
2018	June 3	(United States) Gavin Harlien	
2018	June 4	(United States) Arie Luyendyk Jr.	

^A Race suspended after three laps following Matt Mingay's wreck on lap three that resulted in injury.

=== Trans-Am Motor City 100 ===
Starting in 1984, the SCCA Trans-Am Series held a support race during the Grand Prix weekend. The Motor City 100 was often regarded as one of the most important events of the Trans-Am schedule due to the increased television and sponsor exposure, made possible by the international broadcast of the Grand Prix. The Trans-Am race wasn't popular with the Formula One drivers though with the heavy and powerful Trans-Am cars with their huge rear wheels having a tendency to break up the track, already in a suspect state thanks to the heat of the summer when the races were scheduled. This often made the Grands Prix a more difficult prospect due to drivers having to go offline on to the 'dirty' part of the road to avoid problem areas on the track surface.

Year	Driver	Car
1984	Tom Gloy	Mercury Capri
1985	Elliott Forbes-Robinson^{B}	Buick Regal
1986	Wally Dallenbach Jr.	Chevrolet Camaro
1987	Scott Pruett	Merkur XR4Ti
1988	Hurley Haywood	Audi Quattro
1989	Greg Pickett	Chevrolet Camaro
1990	Scott Sharp	Chevrolet Camaro
1991	Scott Sharp	Chevrolet Camaro
1992	Tommy Archer	Dodge Daytona
1993	Dorsey Schroeder	Ford Mustang
1994	Bill Saunders	Ford Mustang
1995	Ron Fellows	Chevrolet Camaro
1996	Dorsey Schroeder	Ford Mustang
1997	Tommy Kendall	Ford Mustang
1998	Paul Gentilozzi	Chevrolet Camaro
1999	Brian Simo	Ford Mustang
2000	Paul Gentilozzi	Jaguar XKR
2001	Paul Gentilozzi	Jaguar XKR
2002– 2015	Not held	
2016; Race 1	RJ Lopez (TA1); Kyle Marcelli (TA2); Dean Martin (TA4)	Chevrolet Corvette; Chevrolet Camaro; Ford Mustang
2016; Race 2	John Baucom (TA1); Adam Andretti (TA2); Ernie Francis Jr. (TA4)	Ford Mustang; Dodge Challenger; Ford Mustang
2017	Ernie Francis Jr. (TA1); Gar Robinson (TA2)	Ford Mustang; Chevrolet Camaro
2018; Race 1	Tony Buffomante (TA2)	Ford Mustang
2018; Race 2	Rafa Matos (TA2)	Chevrolet Camaro
2019; Race 1	Misha Goikhberg (TA2)	Chevrolet Camaro
2019; Race 2	Tony Ave (TA2)	Chevrolet Camaro
2020	Canceled due to the COVID-19 pandemic	
2021– 2022	Not held	
2023; Race 1	Brent Crews (TA2)	Ford Mustang
2023; Race 2	Connor Zilisch (TA2)	Chevrolet Camaro
2024– present	Not held	

^B Winner Wally Dallenbach Jr. was disqualified due to car being underweight.

Preceded by Indianapolis 500	IndyCar Series; Chevrolet Detroit Grand Prix	Succeeded by Bommarito Automotive Group 500
