= 1991 Trans-Am Series =

American sports car racing competition

Seasons
- ← 1990 1992 →

The 1991 Liquid Tide Trans-Am Tour was the 26th season of the Sports Car Club of America's Trans-Am Series. It was the first season with competition from the sister SCCA Pro Racing World Challenge. 1991 was also the first season since 1979 to have a round outside of the United States and Canada, with a race in Mexico on the schedule that year. Oldsmobile, although very successful in 1991, would never again see success in Trans Am.

== Results ==
Round	Date	Circuit	Winning driver	Winning vehicle
1	(United States) Sears Point	5 May	(United States) Darin Brassfield	Oldsmobile Cutlass
2	Mexico City	19 May	(United States) Scott Sharp	Chevrolet Camaro
3	(United States) Dallas	2 June	(United States) Irv Hoerr	Oldsmobile Cutlass
4	(United States) Detroit	15 June	(United States) Scott Sharp	Chevrolet Camaro
5	(United States) Portland	22 June	(United States) Irv Hoerr	Oldsmobile Cutlass
6	(United States) Cleveland	6 July	(United States) Darin Brassfield	Oldsmobile Cutlass
7	(United States) Des Moines	14 July	(United States) George Robinson	Chevrolet Camaro
8	(United States) Watkins Glen	10 August	(United States) Scott Sharp	Chevrolet Camaro
9	(Canada) Trois-Rivières	18 August	(United States) Scott Sharp	Chevrolet Camaro
10	(United States) Denver	24 August	(United States) Irv Hoerr	Oldsmobile Cutlass
11	(Canada) Mosport Park	8 September	(United States) Scott Sharp	Chevrolet Camaro
12	(United States) Mid-Ohio	14 September	(United States) Darin Brassfield	Oldsmobile Cutlass
13	(United States) Road America	21 September	(United States) Scott Sharp	Chevrolet Camaro
14	(United States) College Station	20 October	(United States) Jack Baldwin	Chevrolet Camaro

== Final points standings ==
Place	Driver	Points
1	(United States) Scott Sharp	360
2	(United States) Jack Baldwin	290
3	(United States) Darin Brassfield	271
4	(United States) Irv Hoerr	269
5	(Canada) Ron Fellows	246
6	(United States) Bob Sobey	234
7	(United States) Les Lindley	230
8	(United States) Randy Ruhlman	213
9	(United States) Paul Gentilozzi	209
10	(United States) Greg Pickett	202
11	(United States) Jim Derhaag	198
12	(United States) George Robinson	177
13	(United States) Steve Petty	171
14	(United States) Glenn Fox	135
15	(United States) Steve Saleen	122
16	(United States) Jerry Clinton	116
17	(United States) Bruce Nesbitt	111
18	(United States) Deborah Gregg	96
19	(United States) John S. E. Anderson	91
20	(United States) Stuart Hayner	68
20	(United States) Richard J. Valentine	68
22	(United States) Phillip Bartelt	66
22	(United States) Ed Hinchliff	66
24	(United States) Wayne Akers	64
25	(United States) Bob Patch	54
25	(United States) Donald Sak	54
27	(United States) Chris Kneifel	42
27	(United States) Scott Lagasse	42
29	(United States) Jerry Brassfield	38
30	(United States) Jim Stevens	31
31	(United States) Dick Danielson	30
32	(Canada) Jerry Simmons	29
33	(United States) Mark Pielsticker	27
33	(United States) J. Craig Shafer	27
35	(United States) Tom Gloy	26
36	(United States) John Brumder	24
37	(United States) Buzz Dyer	21
37	(United States) Lou Gigliotti	21
37	(United States) Steve Mahre	21
37	(United States) Richard Myhre	21
41	(Mexico) Michel Jourdain Sr.	19
42	(Mexico) Tomas Lopez	16
43	(Canada) Peter DeMan	15
43	(United States) Rick Dittman	15
45	(United States) Mitchell Bender	14
45	(Canada) John Jones	14
47	(United States) R. K. Smith	13
48	(United States) Jimmy Landrum	11
49	(United States) R. Gary Fautch	8
49	(United States) Rich Sloma	8
51	(United States) Scott Pruett	8
52	(United States) Michael Kehoe	7
53	(United States) Paul Dallenbach	6
53	(United States) Robert R. Ripple	6
55	(United States) Courtney Smith	5
56	(United States) Wally Dallenbach Jr.	4
56	(United States) Tom Forgione	4
58	(United States) Rob Fellows	3
59	(United States) Phil Mahre	2
59	(United States) Clint Welding	2
59	(United States) Bob Zeeb	2
62	(United States) John Heinricy	1
62	(United States) Aaron Wilson	1
64	(United States) Mike Dougherty	0
64	(United States) Mike Downs	0
64	(United States) Jamie Galles	0
64	(United States) W. K. Gonzalez	0
64	(United States) Phil Kalusha	0
64	(United States) Jim Moyer	0
64	(United States) Jim Pallas	0
