= Des Moines Street Circuit =

Former motor race in Des Moines, Iowa

- Location: Des Moines, Iowa
- Coordinates: 41°35′36″N 93°37′24″W
- Opened: 8 July 1989; 37 years ago
- Closed: 4 July 1994; 32 years ago
- Major events: Former: Trans-Am Series (1989–1992, 1994); SCCA Pro Racing World Challenge (1990–1994); ARCA Hooters SuperCar Series (1994); Atlantic Championship (1991)

Grand Prix Circuit (1993–1994)
- Surface: Asphalt
- Length: 1.600 mi (2.575 km)
- Turns: 10
- Race lap record: 1:20.295 ( (United States) Dorsey Schroeder, Ford Mustang, 1994, Trans-Am)

Grand Prix Circuit (1989–1992)
- Surface: Asphalt
- Length: 1.800 mi (2.897 km)
- Turns: 12
- Race lap record: 1:32.386 ( (United States) Scott Sharp, Oldsmobile Cutlass, 1990, Trans-Am)

The Des Moines Street Circuit (branded as the Ruan Greater Des Moines Grand Prix for sponsorship reasons) was an auto racing event held on a temporary street circuit in Des Moines, Iowa from 1989 to 1994.

== History ==
In 1987, after announcing the intention to host a Trans-Am race in 1988, Des Moines officials travelled to the Detroit Grand Prix to gather information on the financials of the race. Two proposed layouts were introduced: one held in the middle of downtown near the Des Moines Convention Center (now the Wellmark YMCA building) and one held on both sides of the Des Moines River. Ultimately the race would be postponed to 1989 after running out of time for preparations. Nine surrounding suburbs, including Ankeny, voted to approve hotel tax revenues being sent to pay off a $1.2 million loan to secure funding for the race.

On November 18, 1988, it was officially announced that the 1989 race would go ahead. The final layout was revealed to be a 1.800 mi (2.897 km) circuit held around the Veterans Memorial Auditorium. Popular Mechanics described the track as "[demanding] more of horsepower and brakes than handling finesse, although there are some significant elevation changes along the way."

For 1993, the layout was straightened at 4th Street and shortened to 1.600 mi (2.575 km). The Sunday Trans-Am race was canceled due to rising river waters as a result of the Great Flood of 1993. Trans-Am driver Ron Fellows started a relief drive at the Molson Indy Toronto the following weekend to help raise funds for those affected by the floods.

Attendance to the race dropped off significantly from 50,000 on Sunday in 1990 to 40,000 on Sunday in 1991. Due to dwindling attendance and financial trouble, the race for 1995 was cancelled with hopes of a return for 1996. On March 30, 1995, the Grand Prix board voted to declare bankruptcy.

Notable drivers to have raced the Greater Des Moines Grand Prix include Bill Elliott, Tommy Kendall, Jovy Marcelo, Willy T. Ribbs, Lyn St. James, and Jimmy Vasser.

== Lap records ==
The fastest official race lap records at the Des Moines Street Circuit are listed as:

Category	Time	Driver	Vehicle	Event
Street Circuit (1993–1994): 1.600 mi (2.575 km)
Trans-Am	1:20.295	Dorsey Schroeder	Ford Mustang	1994 Des Moines Trans-Am round
Street Circuit (1989–1992): 1.800 mi (2.897 km)
Trans-Am	1:32.386	Scott Sharp	Oldsmobile Cutlass	1990 Des Moines Trans-Am round
Formula Atlantic	1:34.039	John Tanner	Swift DB4	1991 Des Moines Atlantic Championship round

== Past winners ==
=== Trans-Am ===
Season	Date	Driver	Car	Laps	Race Time	Average Speed (mph)	Refs
1989	July 9	(United States) Dorsey Schroeder	Ford Mustang	66	1:56:02	61.427	
1990	July 15	(United States) Tommy Kendall	Chevrolet Beretta	69	1:49:11	71.243	
1991	July 15	(United States) George Robinson	Chevrolet Camaro	62	1:44:08	71.44	
1992	July 12	(United States) Scott Sharp	Chevrolet Camaro	50	1:37:46	61.363	
1993	July 11	Race cancelled by Great Flood of 1993					
1994	July 4	(United States) Dorsey Schroeder	Ford Mustang	63	1:31:32	66.066	

=== ARCA ===
Season	Date	Driver	Car	Laps	Race Time	Average Speed (mph)	Refs
1994	July 3	(United States) Scott Lagasse	Chevrolet Lumina	75	2:14:24	53.571	

=== Atlantic Championship ===
Season	Date	Driver	Car	Laps	Race Time	Refs
1991	July 13	(United States) Jimmy Vasser	Swift DB4	30	0:55:39.091	
