= 1990 Trans-Am Series =

American sports car racing competition

Seasons
- ← 1989 1991 →

The 1990 Trans-Am Series was the 25th running of the Sports Car Club of America's Trans-Am Series. Tommy Kendall won his first of four driver's championships, driving a Spice Engineering-run Chevrolet Beretta.

== Results ==
Rnd	Date	Circuit	Location	Winning driver	Winning vehicle
1	March 10	Phoenix Street Circuit	Phoenix, Arizona	(Finland) Robert Lappalainen	Ford Mustang
2	May 6	Sears Point International Raceway	Sonoma, California	(United States) Darin Brassfield	Oldsmobile Cutlass
3	June 3	Addison Airport Circuit	Addison, Texas	(United States) Irv Hoerr	Oldsmobile Cutlass
4	June 16	Detroit Street Circuit	Detroit, Michigan	(United States) Scott Sharp	Oldsmobile Cutlass
5	June 23	Portland International Raceway	Portland, Oregon	(United States) Darin Brassfield	Oldsmobile Cutlass
6	July 7	Burke Lakefront Airport	Cleveland, Ohio	(United States) Tommy Kendall	Chevrolet Beretta
7	July 15	Des Moines Grand Prix	Des Moines, Iowa	(United States) Tommy Kendall	Chevrolet Beretta
8	July 29	Road Atlanta	Braselton, Georgia	(United States) Tommy Kendall	Chevrolet Beretta
9	August 11	Watkins Glen International	Watkins Glen, New York	(United States) Chris Kneifel	Chevrolet Beretta
10	August 19	Circuit Trois-Rivières	Trois-Rivières, Quebec	(United States) Tommy Kendall	Chevrolet Beretta
11	August 25	Denver Street Circuit	Denver, Colorado	(United States) Tommy Kendall	Chevrolet Beretta
12	September 9	Mosport Park	Bowmanville, Ontario	(United States) Dorsey Schroeder	Ford Mustang
13	September 15	Mid-Ohio Sports Car Course	Lexington, Ohio	(United States) Darin Brassfield	Oldsmobile Cutlass
14	September 22	Road America	Elkhart Lake, Wisconsin	(United States) Tommy Kendall	Chevrolet Beretta
15	November 4	St. Petersburg Street Circuit	St. Petersburg, Florida	(United States) Chris Kneifel	Chevrolet Beretta

== Championship standings (Top 10) ==
Pos	Driver	Points
1	(United States) Tommy Kendall	393
2	(United States) Chris Kneifel	295
3	(United States) Darin Brassfield	293
4	(Finland) Robert Lappalainen	244
5	(United States) Jack Baldwin	233
6	(United States) Scott Sharp	232
7	(United States) Max Jones	225
8	(United States) Irv Hoerr	216
9	(United States) Jim Derhaag	212
10	(Canada) Ron Fellows	202
