= 1992 Trans-Am Series =

American sports car racing competition

Seasons
- ← 1991 1993 →

The 1992 Tide Trans-Am Tour was the 27th season of the Sports Car Club of America's Trans-Am Series.

== Results ==
Round	Date	Circuit	Winning driver	Winning vehicle
1	11 April	Long Beach	(United States) Robby Gordon	Ford Mustang
2	6 June	Detroit	(United States) Tommy Archer	Dodge Daytona
3	20 June	Portland	(United States) Paul Gentilozzi	Chevrolet Camaro
4	28 June	Mosport	(United States) Scott Sharp	Chevrolet Camaro
5	12 July	Des Moines	(United States) Scott Sharp	Chevrolet Camaro
6	25 July	Lime Rock Park	(Canada) Ron Fellows	Ford Mustang
7	8 August	Watkins Glen	(United States) Jack Baldwin	Chevrolet Camaro
8	16 August	Trois-Rivières	(United States) Jack Baldwin	Chevrolet Camaro
9	22 August	Road America	(Canada) Ron Fellows	Ford Mustang
10	12 September	Mid-Ohio	(United States) Greg Pickett	Chevrolet Camaro
11	4 October	Sears Point	(United States) Darin Brassfield	Chevrolet Camaro

== Championships ==
=== Driver (Top 10) ===
Pos	Driver	Points
1	(United States) Jack Baldwin	279
2	(United States) Scott Sharp	275
3	(United States) Tommy Archer	220
4	(Canada) Ron Fellows	213
5	(United States) Greg Pickett	193
6	(United States) George Robinson	192
7	(United States) Jim Derhaag	190
8	(United States) Randy Ruhlman	189
9	(United States) Bobby Archer	171
10	(United States) Deborah Gregg	107

=== Notes ===
There was a race scheduled for Juarez, Mexico to take place on September 27, but it was cancelled due to a potential creditors' boycott.

=== Manufacturers ===
1. Chevrolet – 91 points
2. Ford – 50 points
3. Dodge – 48 points
