= Don Knowles (racing driver) =

American racing driver (born 1947)

Don Knowles (born April 12, 1947) is an American racing driver renowned for his extensive career in production-based sports car racing, particularly within the Sports Car Club of America and endurance events. Knowles has won six SCCA national championships and holds the world record for the most 24-hour race victories, with a total of 14 wins.

== Early life ==
Knowles was raised in Durham, North Carolina and graduated from North Carolina State University with a degree in engineering. Fascinated by an autocross event being held in a local shopping center parking lot, he decided to enter his daily driver, a Volkswagen Beetle. The experience led to Knowles attending his first SCCA driver's school in 1972 at Virginia International Raceway and the start a long involvement with American motorsports.

== Career ==
Knowles began his SCCA career racing an Opel sedan in the Washington, DC region. Success led to an opportunity to drive for Saab, a brand that was trying to expand its presence in the United States at the time.

Following two SCCA Runoffs national titles in the 1978-79 Showroom Stock B class with Saab cars, Knowles began to focus on endurance racing. He was the top American finisher at the 1982 Renault Cup International Challenge at Circuit Paul Ricard in France. In the professional IMSA Firehawk and SCCA Escort series, Knowles became one of the most successful drivers to ever compete in either. He won a world record 14 24-hour races, including three in both 1987 and 1988. Knowles has 35 career wins in the Firehawk and Escort series as well as victories in the VW Rabbit Cup and Renault Cup. In the 1990 IMSA GT Championship series, with the factory Dodge team, he won in the GTU class at Mosport Park, Lime Rock Park and Del Mar.

In 1990, Don Knowles was a member of the 8-driver Corvette ZR1 team which set the Fédération Internationale de l'Automobile (FIA) world endurance record at Ft. Stockton, Tex., averaging over 175 mph for 24 hours. The team also included John Heinricy, Scott Lagasse, Jim Minneker, Scott Allman, Kim Baker, Stuart Hayner and team owner/driver Tommy Morrison.

In the early 2000s, Knowles returned to club racing and found success with cars including the Pontiac Solstice, Ford Mustang GT and Mazda RX-8.

Off track, Knowles served as a driving instructor for General Motors engineers and was an instrumental member of the Showroom Stock Advisory Committee in the early days of the class. He wrote for SCCA’s SportsCar magazine, contributed to Road & Track, and served on the SCCA’s Washington DC Region Board of Directors.

Knowles balanced racing with a long career in U.S. government service. He was a former staffer on the U. S. Senate Committee on Appropriations and former Associate Deputy Secretary of U. S. Department of Interior. Knowles retired in 2003 as Director of Protected Resources for the National Marine Fisheries Service.

In 2011, Don Knowles received the Road Racing Drivers Club's Bob Akin Award, recognizing his sportsmanship, contributions to motorsports, and achievements as an amateur and semi-professional driver.

In 2026, Knowles was inducted into the SCCA Hall of Fame.

== Racing record ==
=== SCCA National Championship Runoffs ===
Year	Track	Car	Class	Finish	Start
1977	Road Atlanta	Saab 99	Showroom Stock B	10	10
1978	Road Atlanta	Saab 99	Showroom Stock B	1	1
1979	Road Atlanta	Saab 99	Showroom Stock B	1	1
1979	Road Atlanta	Saab 900 Turbo	Showroom Stock A	15	6
1980	Road Atlanta	Saab 900 Turbo	Showroom Stock A	2	6
1980	Road Atlanta	Saab 99	Showroom Stock B	3	7
2004	Mid-Ohio	Cadillac CTS	Touring 2	5	1
2005	Mid-Ohio	Pontiac Firebird	Touring 2	3	3
2006	Heartland Motorsports Park	Pontiac Solstice	Showroom Stock B	1	2
2007	Heartland Motorsports Park	Pontiac Solstice	Touring 2	1	1
2008	Heartland Motorsports Park	Pontiac Solstice GXP	Touring 2	13	1
2009	Road America	Pontiac Solstice GXP	Touring 2	1	2
2010	Road America	Pontiac Solstice GXP	Touring 2	18	5
2011	Road America	Pontiac Solstice GXP	Touring 2	12	9
2012	Road America	Ford Mustang GT	Touring 2	1	1
2013	Road America	Ford Mustang GT	Touring 2	5	5
2015	Daytona International Speedway	Pontiac Firebird	Touring 4	9	9
2016	Mid-Ohio	Mazda RX-8	Touring 4	3	3
2017	Indianapolis Motor Speedway	Mazda RX-8	Touring 4	6	4
2018	Sonoma Raceway	Mazda RX-8	Touring 4	8	8
