= 1989 Trans-Am Series =

American sports car racing competition

Seasons
- ← 1988 1990 →

The 1989 Trans-Am Series was the 24th running of the Sports Car Club of America's premier series. The year marked a new era in Trans Am, with American branded automobiles with American V8 engines, regardless of what vehicle was being used. For example, the Buick Somerset came with a three-liter V6 at best, but was entered with a V8 in the series. This new "American muscle revival" era would last for eleven seasons, after which the Italian manufacturer Qvale would win the championship.

== Results ==
Round	Date	Circuit	Winning driver	Winning vehicle
1	14 April	Long Beach	(United States) Irv Hoerr	Oldsmobile Cutlass
2	7 May	Sears Point	(United States) Darin Brassfield	Chevrolet Corvette
3	14 May	Dallas	(United States) Dorsey Schroeder	Ford Mustang
4	17 June	Detroit	(United States) Greg Pickett	Chevrolet Corvette
5	1 July	Cleveland	(United States) Irv Hoerr	Oldsmobile Cutlass
6	9 July	Des Moines	(United States) Dorsey Schroeder	Ford Mustang
7	23 July	Brainerd	(United States) Irv Hoerr	Oldsmobile Cutlass
8	5 August	Lime Rock	(United States) Dorsey Schroeder	Ford Mustang
9	20 August	Road Atlanta	(United States) Dorsey Schroeder	Ford Mustang
10	2 September	Mid Ohio	(United States) Dorsey Schroeder	Ford Mustang
11	9 September	Road America	(United States) Dorsey Schroeder	Ford Mustang
12	24 September	Mosport	(Canada) Ron Fellows	Ford Mustang
13	15 October	Topeka	(United States) Max Jones	Chevrolet Beretta
14	29 October	St. Petersburg	(United States) Irv Hoerr	Oldsmobile Cutlass
