= John Heinricy =

American racing driver

John Heinricy (born November 19, 1947) is an American automotive engineer and noted racecar driver. He had a long and distinguished career at General Motors, serving as Director of the GM Performance Division before retiring from GM in October 2008. He also has a sub 8 minute time in a 2009 Cadillac CTS-V around the Nürburgring.

In 1990, Heinricy was a member of the 8-driver Corvette ZR1 team which set the Fédération Internationale de l'Automobile (FIA) world endurance record at Ft. Stockton, Tex., averaging over 175 mph for 24 hours. The team also included Don Knowles, Scott Lagasse, Jim Minneker, Scott Allman, Kim Baker, Stuart Hayner and team owner/driver Tommy Morrison.

== Racing record ==
=== SCCA National Championship Runoffs ===
| Year | Track | Car | Engine | Class | Finish | Start | Status |
|---|---|---|---|---|---|---|---|
| 1991 | Road Atlanta | Chevrolet Camaro | Chevrolet | Showroom Stock GT | 2 | 3 | Running |
| 1993 | Road Atlanta | Chevrolet Corvette | Chevrolet | GT1 | 1 | 1 | Running |
| 2001 | Mid-Ohio | Chevrolet Corvette | Chevrolet | Touring 1 | 1 | 2 | Running |
| 2002 | Mid-Ohio | Chevrolet Corvette | Chevrolet | Touring 1 | 1 | 1 | Running |
| 2003 | Mid-Ohio | Chevrolet Camaro | Chevrolet | American Sedan | 1 | 2 | Running |
| 2003 | Mid-Ohio | Chevrolet Corvette | Chevrolet | Touring 1 | 1 | 1 | Running |
| 2004 | Mid-Ohio | Pontiac Firebird | Pontiac | American Sedan | 1 | 2 | Running |
| 2004 | Mid-Ohio | Chevrolet Corvette | Chevrolet | Touring 1 | 1 | 1 | Running |
| 2005 | Mid-Ohio | Pontiac Firebird | Pontiac | American Sedan | 1 | 1 | Running |
| 2005 | Mid-Ohio | Chevrolet Corvette | Chevrolet | Touring 1 | 1 | 2 | Running |
| 2006 | Heartland Park | Chevrolet Corvette | Chevrolet | Touring 1 | 4 | 8 | Running |
| 2006 | Heartland Park | Chevrolet Cobalt SS | Chevrolet | Showroom Stock C | 25 | 3 | Retired |
| 2006 | Heartland Park | Pontiac Firebird | Pontiac | American Sedan | 1 | 9 | Running |
| 2007 | Heartland Park | Chevrolet Cobalt | Chevrolet | Touring 3 | | 1 | Disqualified |
| 2007 | Heartland Park | Pontiac Firebird | Pontiac | American Sedan | 14 | 4 | Retired |
| 2007 | Heartland Park | Chevrolet Cobalt SS | Chevrolet | Showroom Stock C | 1 | 2 | Running |
| 2008 | Heartland Park | Pontiac Firebird | Pontiac | American Sedan | 2 | 1 | Running |
| 2010 | Road America | Chevrolet Corvette | Chevrolet | Touring 1 | 10 | 2 | Retired |
| 2011 | Road America | Pontiac Firebird | Pontiac | American Sedan | 2 | 3 | Running |
| 2012 | Road America | Pontiac Firebird | Pontiac | American Sedan | 23 | 4 | Retired |
| 2020 | Road America | Chevrolet Camaro | Chevrolet | American Sedan | 6 | 9 | Running |
| 2020 | Road America | Toyota 86 | Toyota | Touring 4 | 3 | 1 | Running |
| 2021 | Indianapolis Motor Speedway | Pontiac Firebird | Pontiac | American Sedan | 5 | 7 | Running |
| 2021 | Indianapolis Motor Speedway | Toyota 86 | Toyota | Touring 4 | 1 | 1 | Running |
| 2022 | Virginia International Raceway | Pontiac Firebird | Pontiac | American Sedan | DNS | 8 | |
| 2022 | Virginia International Raceway | Toyota 86 | Toyota | Touring 4 | 2 | 1 | Running |
| 2023 | Virginia International Raceway | Cadillac CT4-V Blackwing | Cadillac | Touring 2 | 4 | 4 | Running |
| 2024 | Road America | Cadillac CT4-V Blackwing | Cadillac | Touring 2 | 5 | 4 | Running |
