= 1993 Trans-Am Series =

American sports car racing competition

Seasons
- ← 1992 1994 →

The 1993 Trans-Am Series was the 28th season of the Sports Car Club of America's Trans-Am Series.

== Results ==
Round	Date	Circuit	Winning driver	Winning vehicle
1	17 April	Long Beach	(Canada) Ron Fellows	Ford Mustang
2	9 May	Road Atlanta	(Canada) Ron Fellows	Ford Mustang
3	12 June	Detroit	(United States) Dorsey Schroeder	Ford Mustang
4	20 June	Mosport Park	(United States) Scott Sharp	Chevrolet Camaro
5	26 June	Portland	(Canada) Ron Fellows	Ford Mustang
6	4 July	Sears Point	(United States) Scott Sharp	Chevrolet Camaro
7	17 July	Toronto	(United States) Scott Sharp	Chevrolet Camaro
8	24 July	Lime Rock Park	(United States) Tommy Archer	Dodge Daytona
9	7 August	Watkins Glen	(United States) Scott Sharp	Chevrolet Camaro
10	15 August	Trois-Rivières	(United States) Scott Sharp	Chevrolet Camaro
11	21 August	Road America	(United States) Scott Sharp	Chevrolet Camaro
12	11 September	Mid-Ohio	(United States) Jack Baldwin	Chevrolet Camaro
13	19 September	Dallas	(United States) Jack Baldwin	Chevrolet Camaro

== Championships ==
=== Drivers ===
1. Scott Sharp – 372 points
2. Ron Fellows – 314 points
3. Jack Baldwin – 306 points
4. Bobby Archer – 265 points
5. Tommy Archer – 242 points
6. Greg Pickett – 242 points
