= Scott Lagasse =

American racing driver (born 1959)

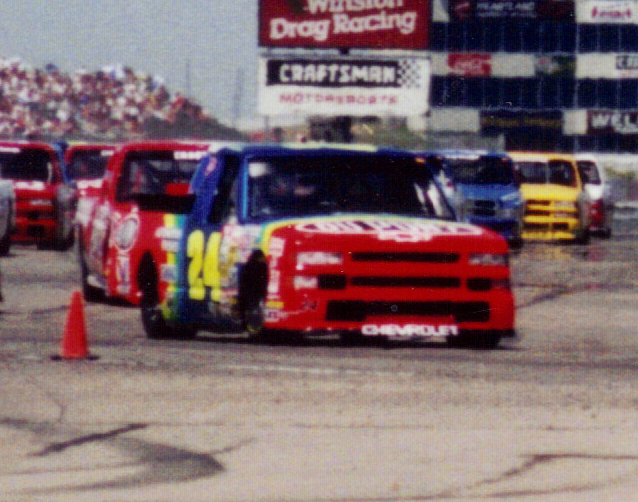
- Lagasse Sr. at Heartland Park Topeka in 1995
- Born: February 20, 1959 (age 67); St. Augustine, Florida, U.S.
- Achievements: 1985, 1986 SCCA National Champion; 1985 SCCA Regional Champion; 1986 SCCA Pro Series Champion
- Awards: 1985 SCCA Rookie of the Year; 1986 SCCA National Sportsmanship Award

NASCAR Cup Series career
- 2 races run over 2 years
- Best finish: 59th (1993)
- First race: 1993 Budweiser At The Glen (Watkins Glen)
- Last race: 1994 The Bud At The Glen (Watkins Glen)
Wins	Top tens	Poles
0	0	0

NASCAR O'Reilly Auto Parts Series career
- 13 races run over 4 years
- Best finish: 53rd (1997)
- First race: 1993 Fay's 150 (Watkins Glen)
- Last race: 1999 Lysol 200 (Watkins Glen)
Wins	Top tens	Poles
0	0	0

NASCAR FedEx Freight Truck Series career
- 24 races run over 2 years
- Best finish: 9th (1995)
- First race: 1995 Skoal Bandit Copper World Classic (Phoenix)
- Last race: 1996 Carquest 420K (Las Vegas)
Wins	Top tens	Poles
0	7	0
- Statistics up to date as of November 20, 2012.

Scott Lagasse Sr. (pronounced LAG-a-say) (born February 20, 1957) is an American race team co-owner and former race car driver. As a driver, he competed in multiple series, most notably the NASCAR Winston Cup Series. Together with his son Scott Lagasse Jr., he currently owns TeamSLR (Scott Lagasse Racing).

== Team ownership ==
TeamSLR began in 1985, operating out of a single-car garage and competing in a variety of motorsports disciplines. In 2016, the team's growing operation relocated to a 19,000-square-foot property on San Marco Avenue in St. Augustine called Art 'n Motion. From there the team focused on competing in the TA2 division of the Trans Am Series, where it has been a fixture ever since. Over the years, TeamSLR has accounted for more than 120 race wins and multiple championships.

The team specializes in driver development for road racing, specifically for those seeking to compete in NASCAR and other motorsports series. In 2025, TeamSLR became an Official Driver Development Partner of Chevrolet Motorsports.

Current young NASCAR driving talents who have worked with the Lagasses and raced for TeamSLR include Carson Kvapil, Sammy Smith, Connor Mosack, William Sawalich, Austin Green, Sam Mayer, Corey Day and Jack Wood. Other notable NASCAR personalities who have wheeled TeamSLR race cars include team owner and former driver Justin Marks, and current NASCAR Cup Series driver Daniel Suárez.

TeamSLR is also the builder of and exclusive distributor for M1 Racecars worldwide, and provides M1 customers with vital technical assistance and on-track feedback to support its performance development efforts.

== Racing career ==
=== SCCA ===
Beginning in 1985, Lagasse became the first driver to earn Novice, Regional and National License all in the same season. More impressive was winning the SCCA National Championship in his very first season of racing. Scott went on the following season to capture the SCCA National Championship again as well as winning an SCCA PRO Title.

From there, Lagasse drove for various manufacturers including Chevrolet, Lotus and Pontiac where he compiled many wins. Lagesse's Sports Car tenure netted three National Titles, multiple International records as well as setting several world record speeds before moving on to stock car racing.

=== Craftsman Truck Series ===
In 1995, Lagasse signed to drive the No. 24 Chevrolet Silverado for BSR Racing in the Craftsman Truck Series The first year team was owned by Billy Hess and Butch Stevens with sponsorship from DuPont. Scott posted seven top-ten finishes and finished ninth in points. Despite this, Dupont chose not to return and the program would move in house with Quaker State and Jack Sprague at the wheel. In 1996, Lagasse ran four races for Kevin Doran and did not record a top ten finish. His last attempt at a Truck race in 1998, for Marty Walsh, but failed to qualify.

=== Busch Series ===
Lagasse made his NASCAR debut in 1993 at Watkins Glen, starting fifteenth and finishing 31st after his No. 75 Oldsmobile suffered transmission failure. In 1994, substituting for Bobby Dotter (broken shoulder) in a race at Watkins Glen, Lagasse replaced Dotter after the first lap narrowly getting out of the pits ahead of leader Terry Labonte and ran through the field to finish a remarkable second. In 1997, he ran nine races for Allen Bloom and did not record a top twenty finish. In 1998, Lagasse ran two races and in 1999 he ran his final one, driving for Ed Rensi, finishing fourteenth at Watkins Glen.

=== Winston Cup ===
Lagasse ran two races in the series, the 1993 and 1994 Watkins Glen races. His best finish was thirteenth in 1993.

=== Other racing ===
Lagasse has also competed in IMSA (include Rolex 24 at Daytona), ARCA, and ASA.

In 1990, Lagasse was a member of the 8-driver Corvette ZR1 team which set the Fédération Internationale de l'Automobile (FIA) world endurance record at Ft. Stockton, Tex., averaging over 175 mph for 24 hours. The team also included Don Knowles, John Heinricy, Jim Minneker, Scott Allman, Kim Baker, Stuart Hayner and team owner/driver Tommy Morrison.

His son, Scott Lagasse Jr., also competed in NASCAR, as well as dirt late models around the Southeast.

== Motorsports career results ==
=== SCCA National Championship Runoffs ===
Year	Track	Car	Engine	Class	Finish	Start	Status
1985	Road Atlanta	Sports Renault	Renault	Sports Renault	1	3	Running
1986	Road Atlanta	Sports Renault	Renault	Sports Renault	1	2	Running

=== NASCAR ===
(key) (Bold – Pole position awarded by qualifying time. Italics – Pole position earned by points standings or practice time. * – Most laps led.)

==== Winston Cup Series ====
NASCAR Winston Cup Series results
Year	Team	No.	Make	1	2	3	4	5	6	7	8	9	10	11	12	13	14	15	16	17	18	19	20	21	22	23	24	25	26	27	28	29	30	31	NWCC	Pts	Ref
1993	Roulo Brothers Racing	39	Chevy	DAY	CAR	RCH	ATL	DAR	BRI	NWS	MAR	TAL	SON	CLT	DOV	POC	MCH	DAY	NHA	POC	TAL	GLN; 13	MCH	BRI	DAR	RCH	DOV	MAR	NWS	CLT	CAR	PHO	ATL		59th	124	
1994	Roulo Brothers Racing	39	Chevy	DAY	CAR	RCH	ATL	DAR	BRI	NWS	MAR	TAL	SON	CLT	DOV	POC	MCH	DAY	NHA	POC	TAL	IND	GLN; 36	MCH	BRI	DAR	RCH	DOV	MAR	NWS	CLT	CAR	PHO	ATL	75th	55	

==== Busch Series ====
NASCAR Busch Series results
Year	Team	No.	Make	1	2	3	4	5	6	7	8	9	10	11	12	13	14	15	16	17	18	19	20	21	22	23	24	25	26	27	28	29	30	31	32	NBSC	Pts	Ref
1993	Henderson Motorsports	75	Olds	DAY	CAR	RCH	DAR	BRI	HCY	ROU	MAR	NZH	CLT	DOV	MYB	GLN; 31	MLW	TAL	IRP	MCH	NHA	BRI	DAR	RCH	DOV	ROU	CLT	MAR	CAR	HCY	ATL					101st	70	
1997	Super Sports Racing	22	Chevy	DAY	CAR	RCH	ATL	LVS	DAR	HCY	TEX	BRI	NSV	TAL	NHA	NZH	CLT	DOV	SBO	GLN; DNQ	MLW	MYB	GTY; 34	IRP; 39	MCH; 31	BRI		RCH; DNQ	DOV; 30	CLT; 25	CAL; 28	CAR; 39	HOM; 36			53rd	561	
1997	Super Sports Racing	22	Ford																								DAR; 40									53rd	561	
1998	Lee Leslie	22	Chevy	DAY	CAR	LVS	NSV	DAR	BRI	TEX	HCY	TAL	NHA	NZH	CLT	DOV	RCH	PPR	GLN; 30	MLW																81st	166	
1998	ST Motorsports	59	Chevy																		MYB; 25	CAL	SBO	IRP	MCH	BRI	DAR	RCH	DOV	CLT	GTY	CAR	ATL	HOM		81st	166	
1999	Team Rensi Motorsports	25	Chevy	DAY	CAR	LVS	ATL	DAR	TEX	NSV	BRI	TAL	CAL	NHA	RCH	NZH	CLT	DOV	SBO	GLN; 14	MLW	MYB	PPR	GTY	IRP	MCH	BRI	DAR	RCH	DOV	CLT	CAR	MEM	PHO	HOM	98th	121	

==== Craftsman Truck Series ====
NASCAR Craftsman Truck Series results
Year	Team	No.	Make	1	2	3	4	5	6	7	8	9	10	11	12	13	14	15	16	17	18	19	20	21	22	23	24	25	26	27	NCTC	Pts	Ref
1995	Hendrick Motorsports	24	Chevy	PHO; 11	TUS; 6	SGS; 17	MMR; 9	POR; 21	EVG; 14	I70; 12	LVL; 21	BRI; 8	MLW; 14	CNS; 14	HPT; 12	IRP; 5	FLM; 25	RCH; 36	MAR; 16	NWS; 9	SON; 4	MMR; 7	PHO; 13								9th	2470	
1996	Doran Motorsports	77	Chevy	HOM; 25	PHO	POR	EVG	TUS	CNS	HPT	BRI	NZH; 17	MLW	LVL; 30	I70	IRP	FLM	GLN	NSV	RCH	NHA	MAR	NWS	SON	MMR	PHO	LVS; 32				56th	340	
1998	Walsh Motorsports	81	Ford	WDW	HOM; DNQ	PHO	POR	EVG	I70	GLN	TEX	BRI	MLW	NZH	CAL	PPR	IRP	NHA	FLM	NSV	HPT	LVL	RCH	MEM	GTY	MAR	SON	MMR	PHO	LVS	NA	-	

^{*} Season still in progress
^{1} Ineligible for series points
