= 1994 Trans-Am Series =

29th season of the Sports Car Club of America's Trans-Am Series

Seasons
- ← 1993 1995 →

The 1994 Trans-Am Series was the 29th season of the Sports Car Club of America's Trans-Am Series.

== Results ==
Round	Date	Circuit	Winning driver	Winning vehicle
1	27 February	Miami	(United States) Tommy Kendall	Ford Mustang
2	22 May	Mosport	(United States) Scott Pruett	Chevrolet Camaro
3	5 June	Mid-Ohio	(United States) Tommy Kendall	Ford Mustang
4	11 June	Detroit	(Canada) Ron Fellows	Ford Mustang
5	25 June	Portland	(Canada) Ron Fellows	Ford Mustang
6	4 July	Des Moines	(United States) Dorsey Schroeder	Ford Mustang
7	9 July	Cleveland	(United States) Scott Pruett	Chevrolet Camaro
8	16 July	Toronto	(United States) Tommy Kendall	Ford Mustang
9	7 August	Trois-Rivières	(United States) Tommy Kendall	Ford Mustang
10	13 August	Watkins Glen	(Canada) Ron Fellows	Ford Mustang
11	28 August	Road Atlanta	(United States) Scott Pruett	Chevrolet Camaro
12	10 September	Road America	(United States) Dorsey Schroeder	Ford Mustang
13	18 September	Dallas	(Canada) Ron Fellows	Ford Mustang

== Championships ==
=== Drivers ===
1. Scott Pruett – 351 points
2. Ron Fellows – 307 points
3. Tommy Kendall – 276 points
4. Dorsey Schroeder – 276 points
5. Paul Gentilozzi – 271 points

=== Manufacturers ===
1. Ford – 109 points
2. Chevrolet – 90 points
