= Phoenix Street Circuit =

Motorsport track in the United States (Phoenix AZ)

- The track in 1991

- The track in 1989 and 1990
- Location: Phoenix, Arizona, United States
- Coordinates: 33°26′52.5″N 112°4′28.5″W
- Capacity: 40,000
- Broke ground: February 1989; 37 years ago
- Opened: June 2, 1989; 37 years ago
- Closed: March 10, 1991; 35 years ago
- Major events: Formula One; United States Grand Prix (1989–1991); Mexican Formula Three Championship (1991); Trans-Am Series (1990)

Grand Prix Circuit (1991)
- Length: 2.312 mi (3.721 km)
- Turns: 15
- Race lap record: 1:21.434 ( (Brazil) Ayrton Senna, McLaren MP4/6, 1991)

Grand Prix Circuit (1989–1990)
- Length: 2.361 mi (3.800 km)
- Turns: 15
- Race lap record: 1:31.050 ( (Austria) Gerhard Berger, McLaren MP4/5B, 1990)

The Formula One United States Grand Prix was held on the Phoenix Street Circuit in Phoenix, Arizona, from 1989 to 1991. It was held in downtown by the Phoenix Civic Plaza and the America West Arena, prior to the introduction of the state's baseball stadium, Bank One Ballpark. The United States Grand Prix lasted in Phoenix for three years, but was dropped without explanation by Formula One management. There were no further Formula One races in the US until the Indianapolis Motor Speedway first held a Grand Prix in 2000.

== Background ==
In 1985, several members of the Phoenix City Council approached Phoenix businessman and real estate developer Howard Pynn about his thoughts on how to bring more focus to the redevelopment of the Phoenix downtown area. The Council Members informed Pynn that this request also came from Mayor Terry Goddard. One of Pynn's initial ideas was to explore the feasibility of a downtown street race, and Pynn was encouraged to explore that possibility by the Council members. Over the next 2 1/2 years Pynn met with John Bishop of IMSA, and representatives of INDY CAR and finally Formula One. Pynn also met several times with Chris Pook who was the organizer of the Long Beach Grand Prix who had dealt with both Formula One and INDY CAR representatives past and present. Pynn encouraged the City of Phoenix to retain the services of Mr. Pook in order to produce a Feasibility Study, the positive results of which Mr. Pook presented in a public forum at a City Council meeting in 1988. Pynn was then asked to move forward with the exploration of the possibility of an FIA sanctioned Grand Prix. The Phoenix City Mayor Terry Godard authorized a City Ad Hoc Committee be formed to further explore the possibilities of a FIA Grand Prix. Pynn was tasked with leading that exploration, and arranged a meeting with Detroit City Officials in Detroit, and along with a representative of the local Phoenix Thunderbird's (organizers of the Phoenix PGA Tour Golf Tournament), and a City Councilman, to establish the various parameters of organizing a Grand Prix from Detroit's perspective. Mr. Pook also suggested to Mr. Pynn that he seek out the Promoter of the Montreal Grand Prix, Mr. Jack Long, for Mr. Long's guidance with the possible of an FIA Grand Prix in Phoenix. On July 19th, 1988 Mr. Long, and Mr. Pynn (with Mr. Pynn's son) met with Bernie Eccelstone (VP of the FIA and head of Formula One) at the Detroit Grand Prix. It was at that lunch meeting the Mr. Eccelstone tasked Mr. Long (who was to be the Phoenix Promoter) to pursue with the City of Phoenix and to come to a contractual agreement for Phoenix to hold a June 1989 Formula One Grand Prix, with subsequent years (5 total) to be held in March as the first Formula One race of each year. On January 13, 1989, the Phoenix City Council headed by mayor [Terry Goddard] agreed to stage an annual Formula 1 race on a five-year contract. Phoenix City Council also voted to spend $9 million of taxpayers' money on race circuit infrastructure over the 5 years. It was well known to organizers that Phoenix can be very hot during summer, but nonetheless, Phoenix inherited the Detroit race's scheduled slot of June 4, 1989. The city had only 4 months to finish the 2.361 mi (3.800 km) long circuit. This required fencing off and repaving the road surface, as well as building grandstands, garages for the pit crew, and other infrastructure. The project was so massive that local media joked that the city looked as if it were preparing for a Soviet invasion.

== Events ==
In the inaugural race in 1989, Ayrton Senna took the pole in his McLaren-Honda but suffered an electronic failure a little over halfway through the race. The heat of the Phoenix desert was hard on teams and drivers, and only 6 of 26 cars finished. Alain Prost, Senna's teammate, won the race ahead of Riccardo Patrese and Phoenix native Eddie Cheever.

In an attempt to beat the scorching heat, the event date was changed to become the season opener the next year. It was held on March 11, 1990. Senna won. Jean Alesi finished 2nd.

The last United States Grand Prix held in Phoenix was on March 10, 1991, with Senna again claiming victory in a modified layout reducing the length to 2.312 mi (3.721 km). Again reliability was a factor, with only nine cars still running at the end of the race. For a second straight season both Tyrrells finished in the points; Stefano Modena, who had replaced the Ferrari-bound Alesi, in fourth heading Nakajima in fifth.

== Cancellation ==
On August 22, 1991, Bernie Ecclestone faxed a message to the City of Phoenix indicating that the Formula 1 race would be held there on March 15, 1992. On September 21, 1991, the City of Phoenix hired Buddy Jobe, the owner of Phoenix International Raceway to be consultant for the city for the next event. On October 7, 1991, however, Ecclestone called the City of Phoenix from his London office to say that Formula 1 would not be returning to Phoenix, giving no explanation as to why. Phoenix City Manager David Garcia said that Ecclestone agreed to pay the city $1.2 million for cancellation of the contract, and that the reason for cancellation may have been a desire to add a South African Grand Prix since apartheid had ended. During the 1992 South African Grand Prix, Ecclestone was asked whether poor attendance was to blame for the cancellation of the Phoenix race; Ecclestone replied that the issue was not the lack of spectators, but "the inability to put more than 20,000 seats in a position where people could see [more than] a small part of the race".

== Legacy ==
On August 12, 2017, new Formula 1 boss Chase Carey criticized Ecclestone for going for too many short term deals in the USA, stating "You have to capture people's imagination. You don't do that with Phoenix, but in New York or Miami." In May 2019, Scottsdale, Arizona resident Eric Schultz commissioned a mural of Ayrton Senna to be painted by artist Mallory Dawn on Central Avenue, 0.62 mi (1 km) south of the former circuit, to honor his two wins there. The mural depicts Senna looking north towards the track's former location. On March 14, 2026 turn one of the former street circuit at Jefferson St and Central was reconstructed to host the Red Bull Showdown event featuring a 2011 Red Bull RB7 Formula One car driven by Patrick Friesacher who was happy to say that the show gave opportunity to people to see an F1 car in Phoenix for the first time since 1991.

== Lap records ==
The fastest official race lap records at the Phoenix Street Circuit are listed as:

| Category | Time | Driver | Vehicle | Event |
Grand Prix Circuit: 2.312 mi (3.721 km) (1991)
| Formula One | 1:21.434 | Ayrton Senna | McLaren MP4/6 | 1991 United States Grand Prix |
Grand Prix Circuit: 2.361 mi (3.800 km) (1989–1990)
| Formula One | 1:31.050 | Gerhard Berger | McLaren MP4/5B | 1990 United States Grand Prix |
| Trans-Am | 1:48.785 | Robert Lappalainen | Ford Mustang Trans-Am | 1990 Phoenix Trans-Am round |

== See also ==
- Grand Prix Arizona – a planned Champ Car race to be held on a different street circuit in Phoenix
