= Chevrolet Corvette ZR1 =

ZR1, (or ZR-1), is a designation that has been used on several different generational models of the Chevrolet Corvette.

1. For the 3rd generation (C3), the ZR1 & ZR2 were special engine packages. Only 53 of these packages were optioned during the 1970 to 1972 model years.
2. For the 4th generation (C4), the ZR1 was the top-tier package that was available from 1990 to 1995, with a special engine designed in partnership with Lotus, after General Motors acquired Group Lotus, and with the objective of creating the world's fastest production car. Other upgrades included steering, braking, specially designed Goodyear tires, and changes to body fascia.
3. For the 6th generation (C6), the ZR1 was a top-tier model package, the centerpiece of which was a new supercharged engine, with the supercharger visible through a window in the hood. There were numerous other upgrades to virtually every aspect of the car.
4. For the 7th generation (C7), the ZR1 was again the top-tier variant available, beginning in 2019. While improvements were made and there were significant changes to the body styling, the engine retained the same displacement and was again supercharged, with the unit visible through a hood window.
5. For the 8th generation (C8), the ZR1 was again on offer as the top variant for 2025, but major changes had been made to the car, not the least of which was to the Corvette layout, switching from a front mid-engine, rear-wheel-drive layout (FMR) to a rear mid-engine, rear-wheel-drive layout (RMR), moving the engine to the rear for the first time since the Corvette was first introduced 65 years prior. Major changes were also made to the engine's crankshaft, the displacement was reduced, and in place of the supercharger, the motor now sported a pair of turbochargers. All this combined made for the most powerful engine in the company's history.

== See also ==
- Corvette Racing
- Chevrolet Camaro
- Cadillac V-series
