= Darin Brassfield =

American racing driver

Charles Darin Brassfield (born September 16, 1963) is a former American racing driver from Los Gatos, California. He attempted to make his CART Championship Car debut in 1985 at the season ender in Miami driving for Wysard Racing. However, he failed to qualify. He returned to sports car racing to gain more experience. He returned to CART for two races at the end of the 1988 season and made his first start at the Mid-Ohio Sports Car Course but was knocked out by engine failure after 30 laps. He also drove at Laguna Seca Raceway a month later but suffered a broken gearbox 31 laps in. He subsequently returned to sports cars and was a multiple race winner in the IMSA GT Championship.

Brassfield also made three NASCAR Winston Cup starts in 1989 on the road courses at Sears Point and Watkins Glen, finishing 22nd and twelfth, and on the oval at Richmond International Raceway, finishing 30th. He also attempted to qualify for the first race of the 1997 Craftsman Truck Series season at the Walt Disney World Speedway but failed to qualify. He continued to be active in IMSA sports car racing until the late 1990s.

== Motorsports career results ==
=== American open-wheel racing ===
(key) (Races in bold indicate pole position; races in italics indicate fastest lap.)

==== CART ====
| Year | Team | Chassis | Engine | 1 | 2 | 3 | 4 | 5 | 6 | 7 | 8 | 9 | 10 | 11 | 12 | 13 | 14 | 15 | Rank | Pts | Ref |
|---|---|---|---|---|---|---|---|---|---|---|---|---|---|---|---|---|---|---|---|---|---|
| 1985 | Wysard Racing | Lola T900 | Cosworth DFX V8t | LBH | INDY | MIL | POR | MEA | CLE | MCH | ROA | POC | MOH | SAN | MCH | LAG | PHX | MIA; DNQ | NC | - | |
| 1988 | KargoStopper | Lola T88/00 | Cosworth DFX V8t | PHX | LBH | INDY | MIL | POR | CLE | TOR | MEA | MCH | POC | MOH; 23 | ROA | NAZ | LAG; 19 | MIA | 44th | 0 | |

=== NASCAR ===
(key) (Bold – Pole position awarded by qualifying time. Italics – Pole position earned by points standings or practice time. * – Most laps led.)

==== Winston Cup Series ====
NASCAR Winston Cup Series results
| Year | Team | No. | Make | 1 | 2 | 3 | 4 | 5 | 6 | 7 | 8 | 9 | 10 | 11 | 12 | 13 | 14 | 15 | 16 | 17 | 18 | 19 | 20 | 21 | 22 | 23 | 24 | 25 | 26 | 27 | 28 | 29 | 30 | 31 | 32 | 33 | 34 | NWCC | Pts | Ref |
|---|---|---|---|---|---|---|---|---|---|---|---|---|---|---|---|---|---|---|---|---|---|---|---|---|---|---|---|---|---|---|---|---|---|---|---|---|---|---|---|---|
| 1988 | Donlavey Racing | 91 | Ford | DAY; Wth | RCH | CAR | ATL | DAR | BRI | NWS | MAR | TAL | CLT | DOV | RSD | POC | MCH | DAY | POC | TAL | GLN | MCH | BRI | DAR | RCH | DOV | MAR | CLT | NWS | CAR | PHO | ATL | | | | | | N/A | - | |
| 1989 | Darin Brassfield | 40 | Chevy | DAY | CAR | ATL | RCH | DAR | BRI | NWS | MAR | TAL | CLT | DOV | SON; 22 | POC | MCH | DAY | POC | TAL | GLN; 12 | MCH | BRI | DAR | RCH; 30 | DOV | MAR | CLT | NWS | CAR | PHO | ATL | | | | | | 50th | 297 | |
