= Scott Sharp =

American racing driver (born 1968)

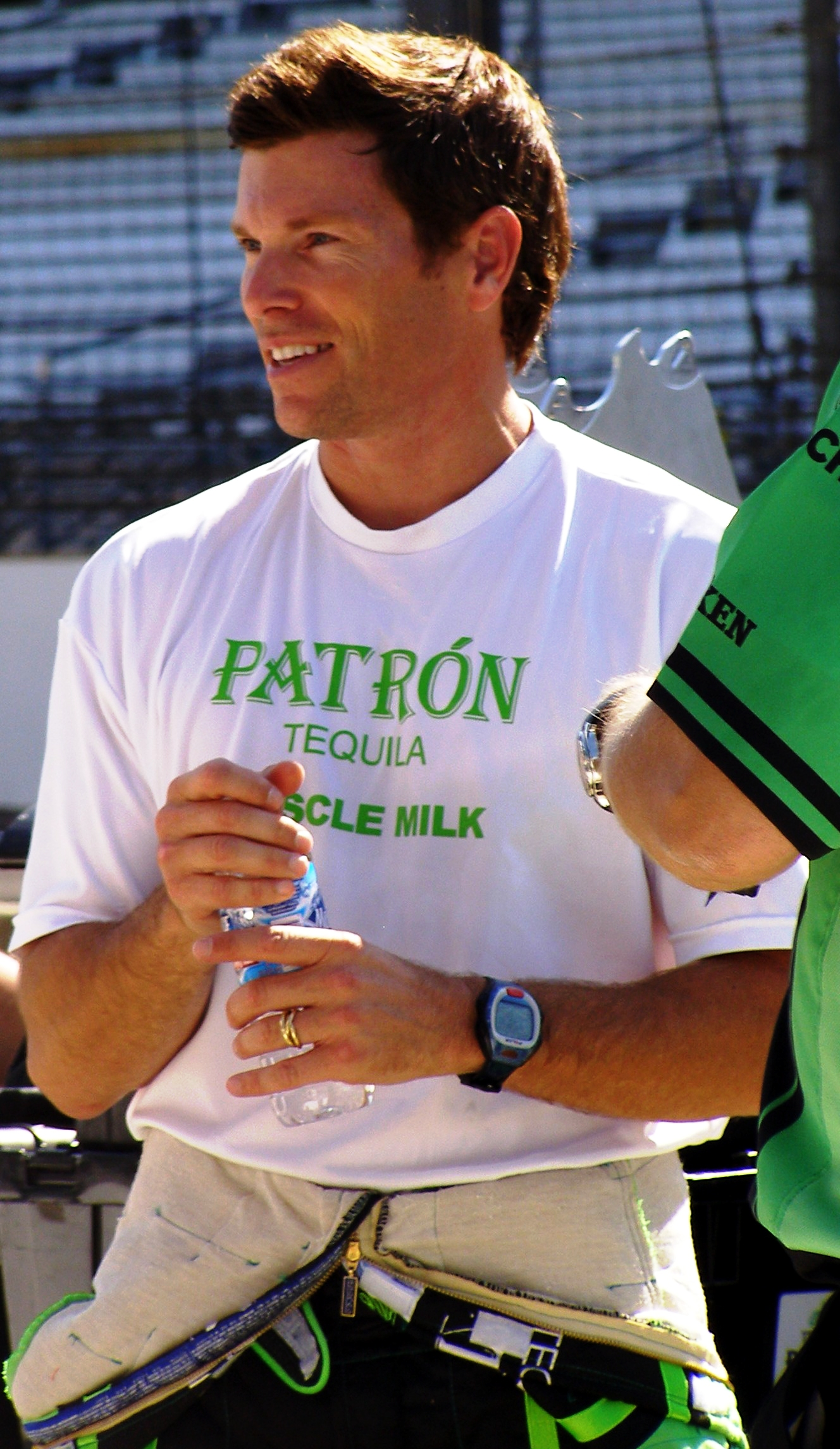
- Sharp at the Indianapolis Motor Speedway in 2007
- Nationality: (United States) American
- Born: February 14, 1968 (age 58) Norwalk, Connecticut, U.S.

WeatherTech SportsCar Championship career
- Debut season: 2008
- Current team: Extreme Speed Motorsports
- Categorisation: FIA Platinum (until 2018); FIA Gold (2019)

Championship titles
- 2009 1996 1993 1991 1988 1987 1986: ALMS LMP1 Champion; Indy Racing League Co-Champion; SCCA Trans-Am; SCCA Trans-Am; SCCA GT-1; SCCA GT-1; SCCA GT-2

IndyCar Series career
- 147 races run over 13 years
- Best finish: 1st (1996)
- First race: 1996 Indy 200 (Orlando)
- Last race: 2009 Indianapolis 500 (Indy)
- First win: 1997 True Value 200 (Loudon)
- Last win: 2005 AMBER Alert Portal Indy 300 (Kentucky)
Wins	Podiums	Poles
9	18	6

Champ Car career
- 18 races run over 3 years
- Best finish: 21st (1994)
- First race: 1993 Toyota Grand Prix of Monterey (Laguna Seca)
- Last race: 1995 Indianapolis 500 (Indy)
Wins	Podiums	Poles
0	0	0

NASCAR Cup Series career
- 1 race run over 1 year
- Best finish: 69th (1992)
- First race: 1992 Budweiser at the Glen (Watkins Glen)
Wins	Top tens	Poles
0	0	0
- Statistics up to date as of June 4, 2012.

Scott Sharp (born February 14, 1968) is an American professional racing driver in the United SportsCar Championship. He is the son of six-time SCCA champion Bob Sharp. Sharp is best known for his years as a competitor in the Indy Racing League.

== Early career ==
Born in Norwalk, Connecticut, Sharp starting racing karts when he was eight years old, winning fifty out of 75 races. Sharp came from a road-racing background, earning several championships including championships in the 1986 SCCA GT-2, 1987 and 1988 SCCA GT-1, and 1991 and 1993 SCCA Trans-Am classes. Sharp competed in one NASCAR Winston Cup Series event, coming in 1992 at Watkins Glen. In 1993, Sharp made his CART debut with Bettenhausen Motorsports and became a full-time competitor in the series in 1994 with PacWest Racing. His first Indianapolis 500 start also came in 1994. In 1996, Sharp was part of Doyle Racing's 24 Hours of Daytona winning team.

== Indy Racing League career ==
=== Overview ===
Sharp is one of only two drivers (the other being Buddy Lazier) to have driven in at least one race in each of the first twelve seasons of IndyCar competition (1996 to 2008). His impressive IRL career has resulted in numerous records for that time period including: most career IndyCar Series starts (147); most consecutive IndyCar Series race starts (138); most races running at finish (110) and previously held the records for most top-ten finishes (82) and most consecutive seasons with at least one race win (seven) (since broken by Hélio Castroneves).

=== History ===
Sharp was a competitor in the first IRL race in 1996, driving for A. J. Foyt Enterprises. He was the co-champion of the IRL's inaugural season in 1996 along with Buzz Calkins. In 1997, two crashes resulting in severe concussions sidelined Sharp until 1998 when he began working with the newly formed Kelley Racing team and sponsor Delphi. At Kelley, Sharp collected eight wins and four pole positions (one being at the 2001 Indianapolis 500). He was third in the championship in 2001, but an influx of strong teams from CART meant that Kelley was not one of the strongest teams after that season. In 2004, he was down in thirteenth in the championship with a best finish of eighth — his first winless season since 1998, also ending a run of top-eight championship finishes dating back to 1998.

Kelley Racing folded following the conclusion of the 2004 season. In 2005, Sharp, along with Delphi, who had become his personal sponsor, moved to Fernández Racing. The switch brought about a small resurgence in Sharp's career and he was once again one of the top drivers in the IRL. 2005 saw him finish fifth in the championship, collecting a win at Kentucky Speedway along the way. However, Sharp struggled through the 2006 season as the team struggled to adapt to the Dallara chassis, and finished eleventh in the points standings.

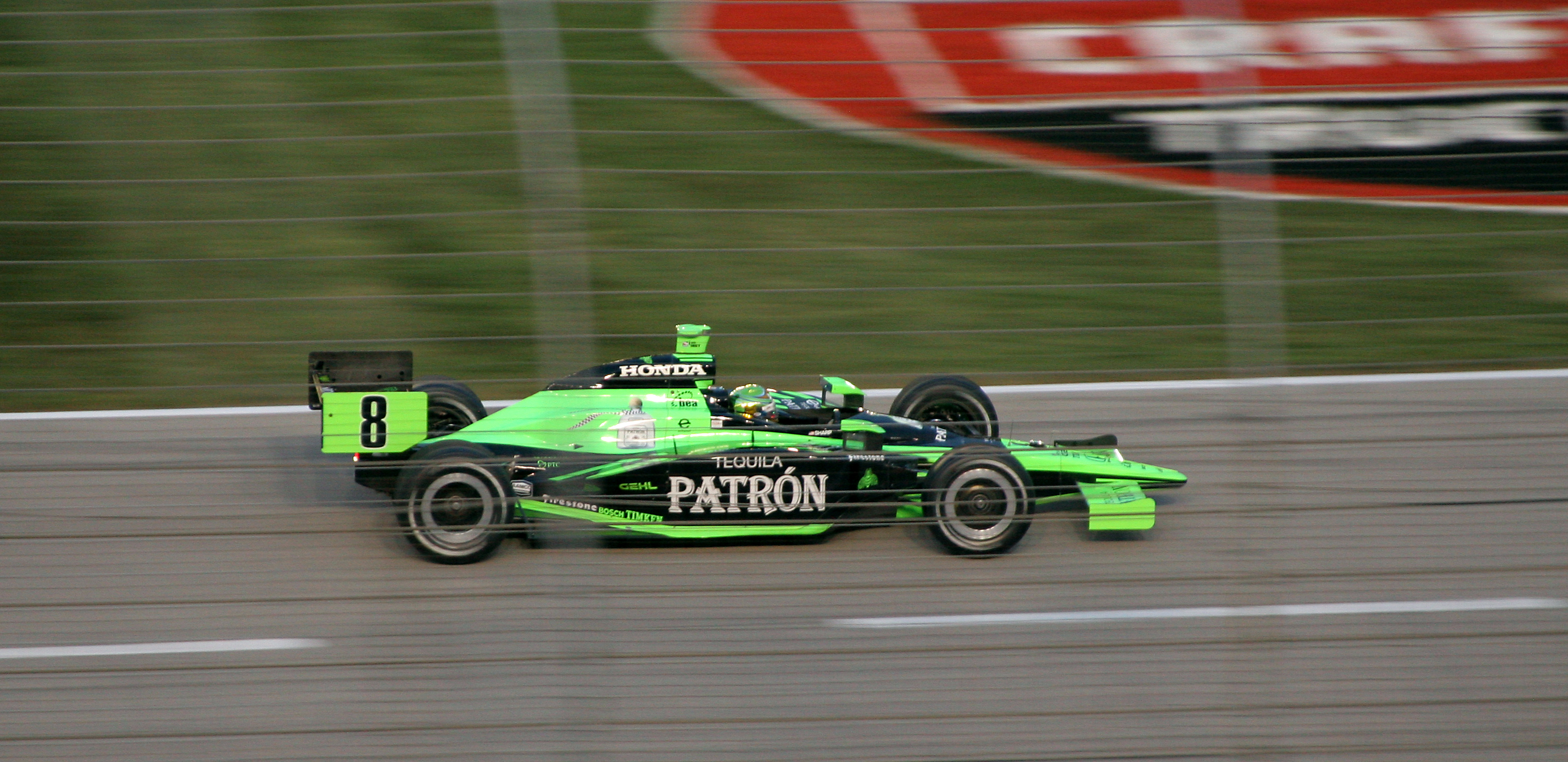
Sharp racing at Texas in 2007

For 2007, Sharp joined Rahal Letterman Racing, teaming with sophomore driver Jeff Simmons. Mid-season, Simmons was replaced with Ryan Hunter-Reay. Sharp brought with him a new primary sponsor, the Patrón Spirits Company, who began as an associate sponsor in 2006. His new association with Patrón ended nine seasons of backing from Delphi. His best finish of the season was third, which he earned at the season opener at Iowa Speedway and at Michigan International Speedway. A highlight of the season was his surprise pole position at Texas Motor Speedway in June, his first pole since 2001. He was also able to capture a career-best sixth place in the Indianapolis 500. Sharp ended the season eighth in the championship.

Sharp returned to the series and competed in the 2009 Indianapolis 500 with Panther Racing. He qualified twentieth and finished the race fourteenth on the lead lap.

== American Le Mans Series career ==
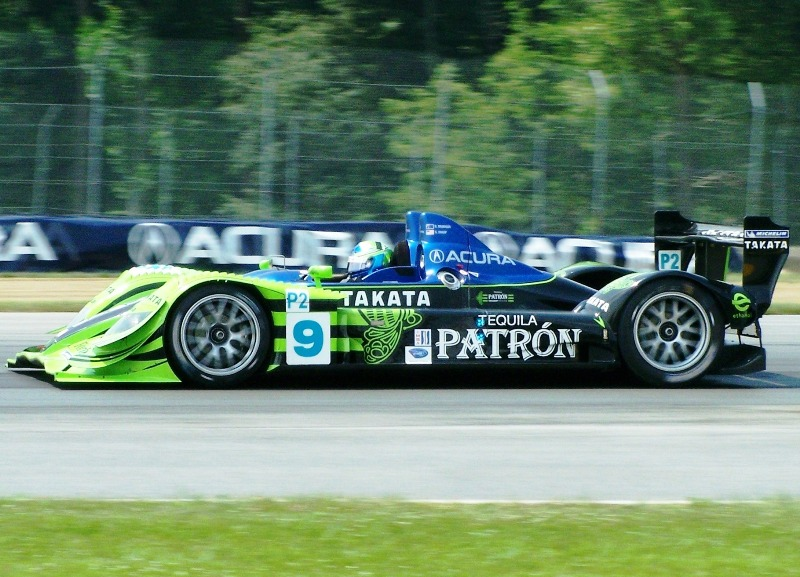
Sharp on track at the Acura Sports Car Challenge of Mid-Ohio in July 2008

Sharp was under contract with Rahal Letterman Racing for 2008, but the two entities parted ways after each filed a breach of contract lawsuit against the other. Sharp and Patrón joined the American Le Mans Series with Highcroft Racing. He drove the No. 9 Patrón Highcroft Racing Acura ARX-01b with David Brabham during the 2008 season in the LMP2 class.

Sharp started seventh in his debut in the Mobil 1 Twelve Hours of Sebring and finished fourth in his class (fifth overall) with his teammates Brabham and Stefan Johansson. The team finished second at the Acura Sports Car Challenge of St. Petersburg, which was Highcroft's best finish to date. Sharp earned his first ALMS win in the P2 class at the Tequila Patron American Le Mans Series at Long Beach. The win was also the first for Highcroft Racing. Sharp earned his first overall win in the American Le Mans Series at the 2008 Northeast Grand Prix at Lime Rock Park after starting from the pole position. A third class victory followed at the Generac 500 at Road America. When leader Gil de Ferran ran out of fuel on the last lap in Mosport awarded the team a fourth victory and second consecutive win.

Arguably, Sharp's breakout ALMS performance came at the Detroit Sportscar Challenge presented by Bosch. He led for most of his stint, giving up the lead only when blocked in heavy traffic. His stellar driving won him SPEEDtv.com's 'Drive of the Race,' though the team had to settle for second place in the event. Sharp and Brabham were joined by Dario Franchitti, one of Sharp's former IndyCar competitors, for the 10-hour Petit Le Mans endurance race. Unfortunately, broken suspension took the car out of the race early on.

The combination of Sharp and Brabham proved formidable, yet bad luck kept Sharp and Brabham from winning the championship. The duo finished second in the P2 point standings, 41 points behind the Penske Racing duo of Timo Bernhard and Romain Dumas, after being as close as four points away with two rounds to go.

=== Extreme Speed Motorsports ===
It was announced on the American Le Mans Series website that Sharp would race in the 2010 series under his own team called Extreme Speed Motorsports. He ran with two Ferrari F430's in the GT class and was sponsored by the Patrón Spirits Company. Sharp raced in 2010 alongside the first announced driver, Patrón CEO Ed Brown.

In 2011, the team switched to Ferrari 458 Italia GT2 cars. The team made steady progress which culminated in a third-place finish at the Laguna Seca race.

The team continued to run in the ALMS in 2013. The No. 02 car picked up another podium finish at the 2012 American Le Mans Series at Long Beach, and the No. 01 won the 2012 Grand Prix of Mosport, the first win for the team since its move to the GT class.

In 2016, Sharp won the Rolex 24 for the second time, this time with ESM.

== Motorsports career results ==
=== SCCA National Championship Runoffs ===
Year	Track	Car	Engine	Class	Finish	Start	Status
1986	Road Atlanta	Nissan 280Z	Nissan	GT2	1	4	Running
1986	Road Atlanta	Nissan 300ZX	Nissan	GT1	1	2	Running
1986	Road Atlanta	Nissan 280Z	Nissan	GT2	4	4	Running
1986	Road Atlanta	Nissan 300ZX	Nissan	GT1	1	2	Running

=== American open-wheel ===
(key) (Races in bold indicate pole position)

==== CART ====
Year	Team	No.	Chassis	Engine	1	2	3	4	5	6	7	8	9	10	11	12	13	14	15	16	17	Rank	Points	Ref
1993	Bettenhausen Racing	33	Penske PC22	Chevrolet 265C V8t	SRF	PHX	LBH	INDY	MIL	DET	POR	CLE	TOR	MIS	NHM	ROA	VAN	MOH	NZR	LS; 22		**48th**	**0**	
1994	PacWest Racing	71	Lola T94/00	Ford XB V8t	SRF; 11	PHX; 9	LBH; 28	INDY; 16	MIL; 12	DET; 13	POR; 18	CLE; 24	TOR; 16	MIS; 12	MOH; 11	NHM; 24	VAN; 12	ROA; 10	NZR; 15	LS; 21		**21st**	**14**	
1995	A. J. Foyt Enterprises	41	Lola T95/00	Ford XB V8t	MIA	SRF	PHX	LBH	NZR	INDY; 26	MIL	DET	POR	ROA	TOR	CLE	MIS	MOH	NHM	VAN	LS	**44th**	**0**	

==== IndyCar Series ====
Year	Team	No.	Chassis	Engine	1	2	3	4	5	6	7	8	9	10	11	12	13	14	15	16	17	Rank	Points	Ref
1996	A. J. Foyt Enterprises	41	Lola T95/00	Ford XB V8t	WDW; 11		INDY; 10															1st-Tie	246	
1996	A. J. Foyt Enterprises	11	Lola T94/00	Ford XB V8t		PHX; 2																1st-Tie	246	
1996-1997	A. J. Foyt Enterprises	1	Lola T95/00	Ford XB V8t	NWH; 1	LVS; 16																22nd	119	
1996-1997	A. J. Foyt Enterprises	1	Dallara IR7	Oldsmobile Aurora V8			WDW; 4				**PPIR**; 22	CLT	NH2	LV2								22nd	119	
1996-1997	A. J. Foyt Enterprises	1	G-Force GF01	Oldsmobile Aurora V8				PHX; 16	INDY; Wth	TXS												22nd	119	
1998	Kelley Racing	8	Dallara IR8	Oldsmobile Aurora V8	WDW; 6	PHX; 1	INDY; 16	TXS; 5	NWH; 3	DOV; 1	CLT; 18	PPIR; 11	ATL; 18	TX2; 23	LVS; 12							4th	272	
1999	Kelley Racing	8	Dallara IR9	Oldsmobile Aurora V8	**WDW**; 4	PHX; 8	CLT; C	INDY; 28	TXS; 10	PPIR; 8	ATL; 1	DOV; 22	PPI2; 22	LVS; 4	TX2; 19							8th	220	
2000	Kelley Racing	8	Dallara IR-00	Oldsmobile Aurora V8	WDW; 15	PHX; 5	LVS; 27	INDY; 10	TXS; 1	PPIR; 3	ATL; 16	KTY; 24	TX2; 13									7th	196	
2001	Kelley Racing	8	Dallara IR-01	Oldsmobile Aurora V8	PHX; 4	HMS; 8	ATL; 2	**INDY**; 33	TXS; 1	PPIR; 8	RIR; 5	**KAN**; 17	NSH; 5	**KTY**; 2	STL; 8	CHI; 25	TX2; 2					3rd	355	
2002	Kelley Racing	8	Dallara IR-02	Chevrolet Indy V8	HMS; 20	PHX; 16	FON; 8	NZR; 1	INDY; 27	TXS; 14	PPIR; 5	RIR; 21	KAN; 6	NSH; 8	MIS; 9	KTY; 4	STL; 18	CHI; 7	TX2; 4			6th	332	
2003	Kelley Racing	8	Dallara IR-03	Toyota Indy V8	HMS; 5	PHX; 7	MOT; 1	INDY; 20	TXS; 16	PPIR; 11	RIR; 17	KAN; 16	NSH; 13	MIS; 4	STL; 10	KTY; 13	NZR; 12	CHI; 11	FON; 8	TX2; 6		8th	351	
2004	Kelley Racing	8	Dallara IR-04	Toyota Indy V8	HMS; 9	PHX; 13	MOT; 9	INDY; 13	TXS; 18	RIR; 9	KAN; 20	NSH; 14	MIL; 15	MIS; 9	KTY; 17	PPIR; 15	NZR; 19	CHI; 9	FON; 11	TX2; 8		13th	282	
2005	Delphi Fernández Racing	8	Panoz GF09C	Honda HI5R V8	HMS; 13	PHX; 5	STP; 18	MOT; 2	INDY; 7	TXS; 4	RIR; 17	KAN; 6	NSH; 4	MIL; 10	MIS; 7	KTY; 1	PPIR; 9	SNM; 12	CHI; 8	WGL; 9	FON; 4	5th	444	
2006	Delphi Fernández Racing	8	Dallara IR-05	Honda HI6R V8	HMS; 7		MOT; 16	INDY; 9		TXS; 5	RIR; 5	KAN; 18	NSH; 17	MIL; 12	MIS; 6	KTY; 16		CHI; 9				12th	287	
2006	Delphi Fernández Racing	8	Panoz GF09C	Honda HI6R V8		STP; 10			WGL; 9								SNM; 14					12th	287	
2007	Rahal Letterman Racing	8	Dallara IR-05	Honda HI7R V8	HMS; 12	STP; 11	MOT; 6	KAN; 13	INDY; 6	MIL; 6	**TXS**; 7	IOW; 3	RIR; 8	WGL; 14	NSH; 7	MOH; 11	MIS; 3	KTY; 6	SNM; 14	DET; 11	CHI; 5	8th	412	
2009	Panther Racing	16	Dallara IR-05	Honda HI7R V8	STP	LBH	KAN	INDY; 14	MIL	TXS	IOW	RIR	WGL	TOR	EDM	KTY	MOH	SNM	CHI	MOT	HMS	34th	16	

Years	Teams	Races	Poles	Wins	Podiums (Non-win)	Top 10s (Non-podium)	Indianapolis 500 Wins	Championships
13	5	147	6	9	9	64	0	1 (1996)

==== Indy 500 results ====
Year	Chassis	Engine	Start	Finish	Team
1994	Lola T94/00	Ford XB V8t	17	16	PacWest Racing
1995	Lola T95/00	Ford XB V8t	30	26	A. J. Foyt Enterprises
1996	Lola T95/00	Ford XB V8t	21	10	A. J. Foyt Enterprises
1997	G-Force GF01	Oldsmobile Aurora V8	Practice crash		A. J. Foyt Enterprises
1998	Dallara IR8	Oldsmobile Aurora V8	7	16	Kelley Racing
1999	Dallara IR9	Oldsmobile Aurora V8	6	28	Kelley Racing
2000	Dallara IR-00	Oldsmobile Aurora V8	5	10	Kelley Racing
2001	Dallara IR-01	Oldsmobile Aurora V8	**1**	33	Kelley Racing
2002	Dallara IR-02	Chevrolet Indy V8	8	27	Kelley Racing
2003	Dallara IR-03	Toyota Indy V8	9	20	Kelley Racing
2004	Dallara IR-04	Toyota Indy V8	20	13	Kelley Racing
2005	Panoz GF09C	Honda HI6R V8	3	7	Fernández Racing
2006	Dallara IR-05	Honda HI6R V8	8	9	Fernández Racing
2007	Dallara IR-05	Honda HI7R V8	12	6	Rahal Letterman Racing
2009	Dallara IR-05	Honda HI7R V8	20	14	Panther Racing

=== Touring/sports car racing ===
==== 24 Hours of Le Mans results ====
Year	Team	Co-Drivers	Car	Class	Laps	Pos.	Class Pos.
1996	(United States) Riley & Scott Cars Inc.	(South Africa) Wayne Taylor (United States) Jim Pace	Riley & Scott Mk III-Oldsmobile	WSC	157	DNF	DNF
2015	(United States) Extreme Speed Motorsports	(United Kingdom) Ryan Dalziel (Denmark) David Heinemeier Hansson	Ligier JS P2-Honda	LMP2	329	28th	10th
2016	(United States) Extreme Speed Motorsports	(United States) Ed Brown (United States) Johannes van Overbeek	Ligier JS P2-Nissan	LMP2	341	16th	10th

==== American Le Mans Series results ====
(Races in bold indicate pole position)

Series	Year	Team	1	2	3	4	5	6	7	8	9	10	11	Final Pos.	Points
ALMS P2	2008	Patrón Highcroft	SEB; 4	STP; 2	LGB; 1	MMP; 9	LRP; **1***	MOH; 2	ROA; 1	MOS; 1	DET; 2	ATL; Ret	LAG; 9	3rd	162
ALMS P1	2009	Patrón Highcroft	SEB; 5	STP; 1*	LGB; **2**	MMP; 2	LRP; 2	MOH; 2	ROA; 1*	MOS; **1***	ATL; 6	LAG; 2		1st	179
ALMS GT2	2010	Extreme Speed Motorsports	SEB; Ret	LGB; 7	LAG; 5	MMP; 7	LRP; 6	MOH; 5	ROA; 8	MOS; 6	ATL; 2			10th	70
ALMS GT	2011	Extreme Speed Motorsports	SEB; 16	LGB; 11	LRP; 4	MOS; 9	MOH; 5	ROA; 8	BAL; 9	LAG; 3	ATL; 6			7th	66
ALMS GT	2012	Extreme Speed Motorsports	SEB; 9	LGB; 3	LAG; 5	LRP; 4	MOS; 1	MOH; 6	ROA; 3	BAL; 3	VIR; 3	ATL; 1		2nd	123
ALMS P2	2013	Extreme Speed Motorsports	SEB; 5	LGB; 1	LAG; 3	LRP; 2	MOS; 2	ROA; 2	BAL; 2	COTA; 4	VIR; 2	ATL; 2		3rd	163

* Overall victory as well as class victory. Italics indicates season is currently running.

=== WeatherTech SportsCar Championship results ===
(key)(Races in bold indicate pole position, Results are overall/class)

Year	Team	Class	Car	Engine	1	2	3	4	5	6	7	8	9	10	11	Rank	Points
2014	Extreme Speed Motorsports	P	HPD ARX-03b	Honda HR28TT 2.8 L V6 Turbo	DAY; 15	SIR; 2	LBH; 6	LS; 11	DET; 5	S6H; 10	MSP; 8	IMS; 5	ELK; 3	COA	PET	9th	228
2015	Tequila Patrón ESM	P	HPD ARX-04b 1 HPD ARX-03b 2	Honda HR28TT 2.8 L V6 Turbo	DAY; 10	SIR; 9	LBH	LS	DET	S6H	MSP	ELK	COA	PET		21nd	45
2016	Tequila Patrón ESM	P	Ligier JS P2	Honda HR35TT 3.5 L V6 Turbo	DAY; 1	SIR; 1	LBH	LS	DET	S6H; 9	MSP	ELK	COA	PET; 2		12th	128
2017	Tequila Patrón ESM	P	Nissan Onroak DPi	Nissan VR38DETT 3.8 L Turbo V6	DAY; 4	SIR; 11	LBH; 2	AUS; 6	DET; 8	S6H; 7	MSP; 3	ELK; 3	LGA; 6	PET; 1		5th	273
2018	Tequila Patrón ESM	P	Nissan Onroak DPi	Nissan VR38DETT 3.8 L Turbo V6	DAY; 19	SEB; 16	LBH; 2	MOH; 10	DET; 4	WGL; 16	MOS	ELK; 9	LGA; 11	PET; 11		16th	186

=== NASCAR ===
(key) (Bold – Pole position awarded by qualifying time. Italics – Pole position earned by points standings or practice time. * – Most laps led.)

==== Winston Cup Series ====
NASCAR Winston Cup Series results
Year	Team	No.	Make	1	2	3	4	5	6	7	8	9	10	11	12	13	14	15	16	17	18	19	20	21	22	23	24	25	26	27	28	29	NWCC	Pts	Ref
1992	Jimmy Means Racing	52	Pontiac	DAY	CAR	RCH	ATL	DAR	BRI	NWS	MAR	TAL	CLT	DOV	SON	POC	MCH	DAY	POC	TAL	GLN; 19	MCH	BRI	DAR	RCH	DOV	MAR	NWS	CLT	CAR	PHO	ATL	69th	106	

== Notes ==
Sporting positions
Preceded by Tommy Kendall	Trans-Am Series champion 1991	Succeeded by Jack Baldwin
Preceded by Jack Baldwin	Trans-Am Series champion 1993	Succeeded by Scott Pruett
Preceded by Inaugural	Indy Racing League Champion; 1996 (with Buzz Calkins)	Succeeded by Tony Stewart
Preceded by Lucas Luhr; Marco Werner	American Le Mans Series champion 2009 with David Brabham	Succeeded by David Brabham; Simon Pagenaud
