= Jack Baldwin (racing driver, born 1948) =

American racecar driver

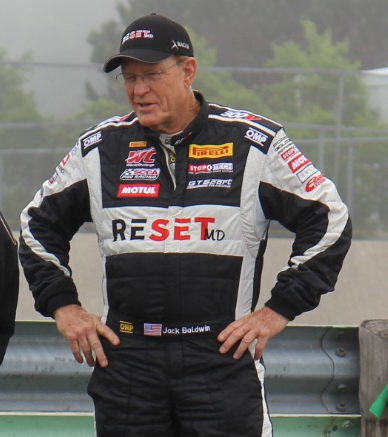
- Baldwin at a Pirelli World Challenge race at Road America in 2014
- Born: May 31, 1948 (age 78); Marietta, Georgia, U.S.
- Awards: 1972 Formula Ford Champion; 1984–1985 Camel GTU Champion; 1992 Trans-Am Series Champion; 2009 HSR Endurance Champion

NASCAR O'Reilly Auto Parts Series career
- 4 races run over 3 years
- Best finish: 75th (1994)
- First race: 1994 Busch Light 300 (Atlanta)
- Last race: 1999 Lysol 200 (Watkins Glen)
Wins	Top tens	Poles
0	1	0

Jack Baldwin (born May 31, 1948) is an American race car driver. Baldwin was born in Marietta, Georgia, and is a legend in road racing, with wins in every series that he has competed in, as well as victories at every major race track in the United States during his successful career that has spanned four decades. He won five professional Championships and over 30 major pro races that include one Daytona 24 Hour win and two 12 hours of Sebring wins. He was invited twice to compete in the prestigious International Race of Champions (IROC) and has driven all types of race cars over the decades. 2013 was his 25th running of the Rolex 24 Hours at Daytona. Baldwin currently drives a Porsche Cayman S for GTSport Racing in the Pirelli World Challenge and is the most successful Porsche Cayman S driver in the world with seven wins, over a dozen pole positions and twenty-plus podium finishes.

== IROC Involvement ==
Baldwin has been invited to the International Race of Champions twice, in 1993 and 1994. During this time, his best finish was two second-place finishes in a photo finish beating Dale Earnhardt at the Talladega Superspeedway and Darlington Speedway finishing between Mark Martin and Earnhardt.

== NASCAR ==
Baldwin made his NASCAR debut in 1994 at a Busch Series race at Atlanta Motor Speedway. Driving the No. 95 Royal Oak Charcoal Chevrolet for Buz McCall's American Equipment Racing, Baldwin qualified 26th and finished 23rd. He ran his next race two weeks later at Darlington Raceway, finishing 24th. In 1998, he returned to the Busch Series to run the Lysol 200 in the No. 59 Kingsford Chevy for ST Motorsports, and finished 20th. He ran the Lysol 200 the next year for Jimmy Spencer in the No. 12 Zippo car, and finished fourth.

== SCCA Trans-Am ==
Baldwin began his Trans-Am driving career in 1990 and achieved the Rookie of The Year Award. In 1992, Baldwin was the champion of Trans Am Series, being the first driver of the modern era to complete every lap of every race of that season, which earned him the Chevy Proud Motorsports Achievement Award for outstanding performance. He drove the Mattel Hot Wheels No. 25 and No. 1 Chevy Camaro for American Equipment Racing.

== IMSA ==
Baldwin won the 1984 24 Hour Race at Daytona driving a Mazda in the GTU Class. He won the 12 Hours of Sebring in 1984 and 1997. Baldwin also won the 1984 and 1985 Camel GTU Championships driving the Malibu Grand Prix Mazda RX 7. Following his back-to-back Champion season, he went on to drive the Peerless Levi Garrett GTO Division Camaro.

== Grand-Am ==
Baldwin drove the No. 74 Riley and Scott MkIII B and C for Robinson Racing from 1999-2004. Winning at Mid-Ohio and Phoenix. He has driven in 25 straight Rolex 24 Hour at Daytona races, including one victory.

== Pirelli World Challenge ==
Baldwin is the most successful Porsche Cayman S driver in the world. He currently drives the #73 GTSport Racing Porsche Cayman S in the Pirelli World Challenge Series. His current accolades in the series include:

2012 Winner Long Beach Grand Prix
2012 Second Place Laguna Seca
2012 Second Place Detroit Grand Prix
2012 Second Place Mosport
2012 Third Place Overall Drivers Championship (inaugural season with PWCC)

2013 Winner St. Pete Grand Prix (Rounds 1&2)
2013 Third Place Long Beach Grand Prix (Round 3)
2013 Third Place COTA (Rounds 4&5)
2013 Third Place Detroit Grand Prix (Round 6)
2013 Third Place Lime Rock Grand Prix (Round 8)
2013 Winner Lime Rock Grand prix (Round 9)
2013 Third Place Streets of Toronto (Round 10)
2013 Second Place Overall Drivers Championship

2014 Third Place Streets of St. Petersburg (Round 1)
2014 Third Place Barber Motorsports Park (Round 3)
2014 First Place Barber Motorsports Park (Round 4)
2014 Second Place Detroit Grand Prix (Round 5)
2014 Winner Sonoma Grand Prix
2014 Second Place Sonoma Grand Prix
2014 Second Place Miller Motorsports Park
2014 Winner Miller Motorsports Park
2014 Second Place Overall Drivers Championship

2015 Third Place Canadian Tire Motorsport Park (Round 7)
2015 Winner Canadian Tire Motorsport Park (Round 8)

www.gtsportracing.com

== Motorsports career results ==
=== SCCA National Championship Runoffs ===
Year	Track	Car	Engine	Class	Finish	Start	Status
1971	Road Atlanta	March 709	Ford	Formula Ford	5	9	Running
1972	Road Atlanta	Titan Mk.6A	Ford	Formula Ford	19	10	Retired
1973	Road Atlanta	Lola T340	Ford	Formula Ford	24	7	Retired

=== NASCAR ===
(key) (Bold – Pole position awarded by qualifying time. Italics – Pole position earned by points standings or practice time. * – Most laps led.)

==== Winston Cup Series ====
NASCAR Winston Cup Series results
Year	Team	No.	Make	1	2	3	4	5	6	7	8	9	10	11	12	13	14	15	16	17	18	19	20	21	22	23	24	25	26	27	28	29	30	31	32	33	34	NWCC	Pts	Ref
1999	LJ Racing	91	Chevy	DAY	CAR	LVS	ATL	DAR	TEX	BRI	MAR	TAL	CAL	RCH	CLT	DOV	MCH	POC	SON	DAY	NHA	POC	IND	GLN; DNQ	MCH	BRI	DAR	RCH	NHA	DOV	MAR	CLT	TAL	CAR	PHO	HOM	ATL	NA	-	

==== Busch Series ====
NASCAR Busch Series results
Year	Team	No.	Make	1	2	3	4	5	6	7	8	9	10	11	12	13	14	15	16	17	18	19	20	21	22	23	24	25	26	27	28	29	30	31	32	NBGNC	Pts	Ref
1994	American Equipment Racing	95	Chevy	DAY	CAR	RCH	ATL; 23	MAR	DAR; 24	HCY	BRI	ROU	NHA	NZH	CLT	DOV	MYB	GLN	MLW	SBO	TAL	HCY	IRP	MCH	BRI	DAR	RCH	DOV	CLT	MAR	CAR					75th	185	
1998	ST Motorsports	59	Chevy	DAY	CAR	LVS	NSV	DAR	BRI	TEX	HCY	TAL	NHA	NZH	CLT	DOV	RCH	PPR	GLN; 20	MLW	MYB	CAL	SBO	IRP	MCH	BRI	DAR	RCH	DOV	CLT	GTY	CAR	ATL	HOM		101st	103	
1999	Spencer Motor Ventures	12	Chevy	DAY	CAR	LVS	ATL	DAR	TEX	NSV	BRI	TAL	CAL	NHA	RCH	NZH	CLT	DOV	SBO	GLN; 4	MLW	MYB	PPR	GTY	IRP	MCH	BRI	DAR	RCH	DOV	CLT	CAR	MEM	PHO	HOM	87th	165	

=== International Race of Champions ===
(key) (Bold – Pole position. * – Most laps led.)

International Race of Champions results
Year	Make	1	2	3	4	Pos.	Pts	Ref
1993	Dodge	DAY; 11	DAR; 8	TAL; 2	MCH; 10	8th	37	
1994	Dodge	DAY; 10	DAR; 3	TAL; 2	MCH; 6	5th	48	
