= 1987 SCCA RaceTruck Challenge season =

The 1987 SCCA Coors RaceTruck Challenge season was the inaugural season of the SCCA RaceTruck Challenge.

== Race calendar and results ==
Round	Circuit	Location	Date	Pole position	Fastest lap	Winning driver
1	Sears Point Raceway	Sonoma, California	April 25			(California) Max Jones
2	Portland International Raceway	Portland, Oregon	June 14	(California) Max Jones		(California) Max Jones
3	Brainerd International Raceway	Brainerd, Minnesota	July 18	(California) Max Jones		(Minnesota) Bobby Archer
4	Mosport Park	(Canada) Bowmanville, Ontario	August 8	(California) Steve Saleen		(Minnesota) Tommy Archer
5	Road Atlanta	(Georgia (U.S. state)) Atlanta, Georgia	September 6	(Minnesota) Bobby Archer		(California) Max Jones
6	Memphis International Raceway	Memphis, Tennessee	September 13			(Michigan) Pete Halsmer
7	Mid-Ohio Sports Car Course	Lexington, Ohio	September 26	(Michigan) Pete Halsmer		(California) Steve Saleen
8	Sebring International Raceway	Sebring, Florida	November 1			(Minnesota) Bobby Archer
9	St. Petersburg Street Circuit	St. Petersburg, Florida	November 7	(United Kingdom) Jeremy Shaw		(Texas) Mike Rutherford

== Final standings ==
Color	Result
Gold	Winner
Silver	2nd place
Bronze	3rd place
Green	4th & 5th place
Light Blue	6th–10th place
Dark Blue	11th place or lower
Purple	Did not finish
Red	Did not qualify (DNQ)
Brown	Withdrawn (Wth)
Black	Disqualified (DSQ)
White	Did not start (DNS)
Blank	Did not participate (DNP)
Blank	Driver replacement (Rpl)
Blank	Injured (Inj)
Blank	No race held (NH)

Rank	Driver	(United States) SON	(United States) PIR	(United States) BIR	(Canada) MOS	(United States) ATL	(United States) MIM	(United States) MOH	(United States) SEB	(United States) STP	Points
1	(United States) Max Jones	1	1	5	5	1	7	18		7	118
2	(United States) Bobby Archer		5	1	2	2	5	11	1	22	101
3	(United States) Tommy Archer		4	2	1	7	4	6		21	95
4	(United States) Don Kostar	3	6	8	3	4	3	3		10	94
5	(United States) Steve Saleen	10		4	6	3	8	1		3	90
6	(United States) Pete Halsmer		10		4	6	1	2		2	84
7	(United States) Pete Farrell			6		5	6	20		4	63
8	(United States) Steve Lewis		3	3	7	DNS		4		19	55
9	(United States) Ray Kong	DSQ	2	9				5		8	47
10	(United States) Don Marcum				13	11	10	10		9	37
	(United States) Robert Allison			14	11	10		19		11	
	(United States) Bob Bergstrom	7				20					
	(United States) Myron Croel	6				16	12	13		23	
	(United States) Don Devendorf									20	
	(Canada) Dave Diedrick				8	18	11	12		6	
	(United States) John Dinkel	4		12							
	(United States) Charlie Downes	DSQ	13								
	(United States) Jack Dysart			15	10	15				15	
	(United States) Tim Evans			10							
	(United States) Jim Fitzgerald									14	
	(United States) Rick Gambill				9	14					
	(United States) Deborah Gregg									13	
	(United States) Glenn Harris	2	7								
	(United States) Charley Hexon					13		17			
	(United States) Tommy Kendall						2				
	(United States) Tom Kline	9	14								
	(United States) John Norris							8			
	(United States) Spencer Low	DNS	9	13		21		7			
	(United States) Steve Potter		8	7		9					
	(United States) Joe Rusz	DSQ	11			12					
	(United States) Mike Rutherford					8				1	
	(United Kingdom) Jeremy Shaw									5	
	(United States) Rob Steven	5									
	(United States) Rick Stevens			16		19	14	14		17	
	(United States) Robert Stewart				12	17	13	15		18	
	(United States) Bill Sundin	8	12							16	
	(United States) Buster Sykes						9	9		12	
	(United States) Tom Winters							16			
	(United States) Dave Wollin			11							
