= Grand Prix of St. Petersburg =

Annual auto race held in St. Petersburg, Florida, United States

Firestone Grand Prix of St. Petersburg

IndyCar Series
- Location: St. Petersburg Street Circuit
- Corporate sponsor: Firestone
- First race: 2003
- Distance: 1.800 mi (2.897 km)
- Laps: 100
- Duration: 180.00 mi (289.68 km)
- Previous names: St. Petersburg Grand Prix (1985–1990); Kash n' Karry Florida Grand Prix of St. Petersburg (1996–1997); Honda Grand Prix of St. Petersburg (2005–2013); Firestone Grand Prix of St. Petersburg (2014–present)
- Most wins (driver): Hélio Castroneves (3)
- Most wins (team): Team Penske (11)
- Most wins (manufacturer): Chassis: Dallara (16); Engine: Honda (10)

Circuit information
- Surface: Asphalt/Concrete
- Length: 2.910 km (1.808 mi)
- Turns: 14

The Firestone Grand Prix of St. Petersburg is an IndyCar Series race held in St. Petersburg, Florida. In most years since 2009, the race has served as the season opener (or at minimum, the first race held on U.S. soil). The race is held annually in the spring, with the exception of 2020, when it was postponed until October due to the COVID-19 pandemic.

The race takes place on the streets of St. Petersburg, utilizing downtown streets, and one runway of Albert Whitted Airport. The event dates back to 1985, with Indy cars first competing in 2003.

== History ==
The inaugural 1985 event was organized by William T. McVey, president of the McBri Corporation in Tampa and a member of IMSA and the SCCA. The SCCA Trans-Am Series held a race on a St. Petersburg downtown waterfront circuit from 1985 to 1990. Can-Am also competed in 1985. Local residents and businesses complained about noise, and the event was eventually put on hiatus. Driver Jim Fitzgerald was killed in a crash during the 1987 race.

From 1996 to 1997, the St. Petersburg race was revived on a different course around Tropicana Field (about one mile west of the original waterfront course). Along with the Trans-Am Series, support races included U.S. FF2000, World Challenge, Pro SRF and Barber Dodge. The event subsequently went again on hiatus for several years.

In 2003, the event was revived again for the CART Championship Series. A new, modified version of the original 1985 waterfront circuit was created. For 2004, the event was cancelled due to a dispute between the promoters, furthermore, the bankruptcy and liquidation of the CART series into the new Champ Car World Series saw a shakeup of the calendar. When the race returned in 2005, it switched to the IndyCar Series, marking the first non-oval event for the Indy Racing League. In 2007, the race weekend was expanded to include an American Le Mans Series event.

Andretti Green Promotions would later take over promotion of the event. Starting in 2014, Firestone took over as title sponsor.

== Past winners ==
Season	Date	Driver	Team	Chassis	Engine/Aero Kit	Tires	Race Distance		Race Time	Average Speed (mph)	Report
Season	Date	Driver	Team	Chassis	Engine/Aero Kit	Tires	Laps	Miles (km)	Race Time	Average Speed (mph)	Report
CART Championship Series history
2003	February 23	(Canada) Paul Tracy	Forsythe Racing	Lola B02/00	Ford–Cosworth XFE	Bridgestone	105	189.630 (305.130)	2:04:28	91.401	Report
2004	Not held										
IndyCar Series history
2005	April 3	(United Kingdom) Dan Wheldon	Andretti Green Racing	Dallara	Honda	Firestone	100	180 (289.681)	2:09:54	83.14	Report
2006	April 2	(Brazil) Hélio Castroneves	Team Penske	Dallara	Honda	Firestone	100	180 (289.681)	1:56:58	92.34	Report
2007	April 1	(Brazil) Hélio Castroneves (2)	Team Penske (2)	Dallara	Honda	Firestone	100	180 (289.681)	2:01:07	89.166	Report
2008	April 6	(United States) Graham Rahal	Newman/Haas/Lanigan Racing	Dallara	Honda	Firestone	83*	149.4 (240.435)	2:00:44	74.251	Report
2009	April 5	(Australia) Ryan Briscoe	Team Penske (3)	Dallara	Honda	Firestone	100	180 (289.681)	2:12:27	81.542	Report
2010	March 29*	(Australia) Will Power	Team Penske (4)	Dallara	Honda	Firestone	100	180 (289.681)	2:07:06	84.975	Report
2011	March 27	(United Kingdom) Dario Franchitti	Chip Ganassi Racing	Dallara	Honda	Firestone	100	180 (289.681)	2:01:00	89.26	Report
2012	March 25	(Brazil) Hélio Castroneves (3)	Team Penske (5)	Dallara DW12	Chevrolet/UAK-12	Firestone	100	180 (289.681)	1:59:51	90.113	Report
2013	March 24	(Canada) James Hinchcliffe	Andretti Autosport (2)	Dallara DW12	Chevrolet/UAK-12	Firestone	110	200 (320.1)	2:22:13	83.539	Report
2014	March 30	(Australia) Will Power (2)	Team Penske (6)	Dallara DW12	Chevrolet/UAK-12	Firestone	110	200 (320.1)	2:06:58	93.572	Report
2015	March 29	(Colombia) Juan Pablo Montoya	Team Penske (7)	Dallara DW12	Chevrolet/CAK-15	Firestone	110	200 (320.1)	2:16:58	86.735	Report
2016	March 13	(Colombia) Juan Pablo Montoya (2)	Team Penske (8)	Dallara DW12	Chevrolet/CAK-16	Firestone	110	200 (320.1)	2:13:28	89.006	Report
2017	March 12	(France) Sébastien Bourdais	Dale Coyne Racing	Dallara DW12	Honda/HAK-16	Firestone	110	200 (320.1)	2:04:32	95.391	Report
2018	March 11	(France) Sébastien Bourdais (2)	Dale Coyne Racing (2)	Dallara DW12	Honda/UAK-18	Firestone	110	200 (320.1)	2:17:48	86.207	Report
2019	March 10	(United States) Josef Newgarden	Team Penske (9)	Dallara DW12	Chevrolet/UAK-18	Firestone	110	200 (320.1)	2:04:18	95.572	Report
2020	October 25	(United States) Josef Newgarden (2)	Team Penske (10)	Dallara DW12	Chevrolet/UAK-18	Firestone	100	180 (289.681)	2:06:12	85.872	Report
2021	April 25	(United States) Colton Herta	Andretti Autosport (3)	Dallara DW12	Honda/UAK-18 (10)	Firestone	100	180 (289.681)	1:51:51	96.552	Report
2022	February 27	(New Zealand) Scott McLaughlin	Team Penske (11)	Dallara DW12	Chevrolet/UAK-18	Firestone	100	180 (289.681)	1:51:27	96.899	Report
2023	March 5	(Sweden) Marcus Ericsson	Chip Ganassi Racing (2)	Dallara DW12	Honda/UAK-18	Firestone	100	180 (289.681)	2:05:30	86.047	Report
2024	March 10	(Mexico) Pato O'Ward	Arrow McLaren (1)	Dallara DW12	Chevrolet/UAK-18	Firestone	100	180 (289.681)	1:51:29	96.867	Report
2025	March 2	(Spain) Álex Palou	Chip Ganassi Racing (3)	Dallara DW12	Honda/UAK-18	Firestone	100	180 (289.681)	1:51:08	97.173	Report
2026	March 1	(Spain) Álex Palou (2)	Chip Ganassi Racing (4)	Dallara DW12	Honda/UAK-18	Firestone	100	180 (289.681)	1:52:22	96.118	Report

- 2008: Race shortened as a result of inclement weather at the start forcing the race to start on Lap 10 after nine Safety Car laps. Shortened by ESPN under time limit.
- 2010: Race postponed from March 28 due to inclement weather.
- 2020: Race postponed from March 15 to October 25.
- 2021: Race postponed from March 7 to April 25 as part of a series of rescheduling with Barber and Long Beach.
- UAK = Universal Aero Kit
- CAK = Chevrolet Aero Kit
- HAK = Honda Aero Kit

== Support series past winners ==
=== Road to Indy presented by Cooper Tire ===
Indy Lights
Season	Date	Winning driver	Chassis	Engine
2005	April 3	(United States) Marco Andretti	Dallara	Infiniti
2006	April 1	(Brazil) Raphael Matos	Dallara	Infiniti
2006	April 2	(Brazil) Raphael Matos	Dallara	Infiniti
2007	March 31	(United Kingdom) Alex Lloyd	Dallara	Infiniti
2007	April 1	(United Kingdom) Alex Lloyd	Dallara	Infiniti
2008	April 5	(Brazil) Raphael Matos	Dallara	Infiniti
2008	April 6	(United States) Richard Antinucci	Dallara	Infiniti
2009	April 4	(Netherlands) Junior Strous	Dallara	Infiniti
2009	April 5	(Netherlands) Junior Strous	Dallara	Infiniti
2010	March 28	(France) Jean Karl Vernay	Dallara	Infiniti
2011	March 27	(United States) Josef Newgarden	Dallara	Honda
2012	March 24	(France) Tristan Vautier	Dallara	Honda
2013	March 23	(United Kingdom) Jack Hawksworth	Dallara	Honda
2014	March 30	(United States) Zach Veach	Dallara	Honda
2015	March 28	(United Arab Emirates) Ed Jones	Dallara	Mazda
2015	March 29	(United Arab Emirates) Ed Jones	Dallara	Mazda
2016	March 12	(Puerto Rico) Felix Serralles	Dallara	Mazda
2016	March 13	(Sweden) Felix Rosenqvist	Dallara	Mazda
2017	March 11	(United States) Aaron Telitz	Dallara	Mazda
2017	March 12	(United States) Colton Herta	Dallara	Mazda
2018	March 10	(Mexico) Patricio O'Ward	Dallara	Mazda
2018	March 11	(Uruguay) Santiago Urrutia	Dallara	Mazda
2019	March 9	(Canada) Zachary Claman	Dallara	AER
2019	March 10	(Netherlands) Rinus Veekay	Dallara	AER
2020	**Season canceled due to the COVID-19 pandemic**			
2021	April 24	(United States) Kyle Kirkwood	Dallara	AER
2021	April 25	(United States) David Malukas	Dallara	AER
2022	February 27	(Australia) Matthew Brabham	Dallara	AER
Indy NXT
2023	March 5	(Singapore) Danial Frost	Dallara	AER
2024	March 10	(United States) Nolan Siegel	Dallara	AER
2025	March 2	(Norway) Dennis Hauger	Dallara	AER
2026	March 1	(United States) Nikita Johnson	Dallara	AER

Star Mazda Championship
Season	Date	Winning driver
2010	March 28	(United States) Conor Daly
2011	March 26	(United States) Connor De Phillippi
2012	March 24	(United States) Connor De Phillippi
2012	March 25	(United Kingdom) Jack Hawksworth
Pro Mazda Championship
2013	March 23	(Venezuela) Diego Ferreira
2013	March 24	(Australia) Matthew Brabham
2014	March 29	(United States) Spencer Pigot
2014	March 30	(United States) Spencer Pigot
2015	March 28	(United States) Neil Alberico
2015	March 29	(United States) Neil Alberico
2016	March 12	(Mexico) Patricio O'Ward
2016	March 13	(United States) Aaron Telitz
2017	March 11	(Australia) Anthony Martin
2017	March 12	(Australia) Anthony Martin
2018	March 10	(Netherlands) Rinus VeeKay
2018	March 11	(Netherlands) Rinus VeeKay
Indy Pro 2000 Championship
2019	March 9	(Canada) Parker Thompson
2019	March 10	(Canada) Parker Thompson
2020	October 24	(United States) Sting Ray Robb
2020	October 25	(New Zealand) Hunter McElrea
2021	April 24	(United States) Braden Eves
2021	April 25	(Denmark) Christian Rasmussen
2022	February 25	(United States) Josh Green
2022	February 26	(United States) Nolan Siegel
USF Pro 2000 Championship
2023	March 4	(United States) Christian Brooks
2023	March 5	(United States) Myles Rowe
2024	March 9	(Australia) Lochie Hughes
2024	March 10	(United States) Nikita Johnson
2025	March 1	(United States) Alessandro de Tullio
2025	March 2	(United States) Max Garcia

USF2000 Championship
Season	Date	Winning driver
2010	March 27	(United States) Sage Karam
2010	March 28	(United States) Sage Karam
2011	March 26	(United States) Spencer Pigot
2011	March 27	(Finland) Petri Suvanto
2012	March 24	(United States) Spencer Pigot
2012	March 25	(United States) Spencer Pigot
2013	March 23	(Canada) Scott Hargrove
2013	March 24	(Canada) Scott Hargrove
2014	March 29	(Brazil) Victor Franzoni
2014	March 30	(United States) R. C. Enerson
2015	March 28	(United States) Jake Eidson
2015	March 29	(United States) Jake Eidson
2016	March 12	(Australia) Jordan Lloyd
2016	March 12	(Australia) Jordan Lloyd
2017	March 11	(United States) Robert Megennis
2017	March 12	(United States) Oliver Askew
2018	March 10	(United States) Kyle Kirkwood
2018	March 11	(France) Alexandre Baron
2019	March 9	(United States) Braden Eves
2019	March 10	(United States) Braden Eves
2020	October 24	(Brazil) Kiko Porto
2020	October 25	(United States) Christian Brooks
2021	April 24	(United States) Christian Brooks
2021	April 24	(United States) Christian Brooks
2022	February 25	(United States) Jace Denmark
2022	February 27	(United States) Myles Rowe
2023	March 4	(Australia) Lochie Hughes
2023	March 5	(United States) Nikita Johnson
2024	March 8	(United States) Max Garcia
2024	March 9	(United States) Max Garcia
2025	February 28	(United Kingdom) Liam McNeilly
2025	March 1	(United Kingdom) Liam McNeilly
2026	February 27	(Colombia) Sebastian Garzon
2026	March 1	(Colombia) Sebastian Garzon

=== NASCAR Craftsman Truck Series ===
Season	Date	Winning driver
2026	February 28	Layne Riggs

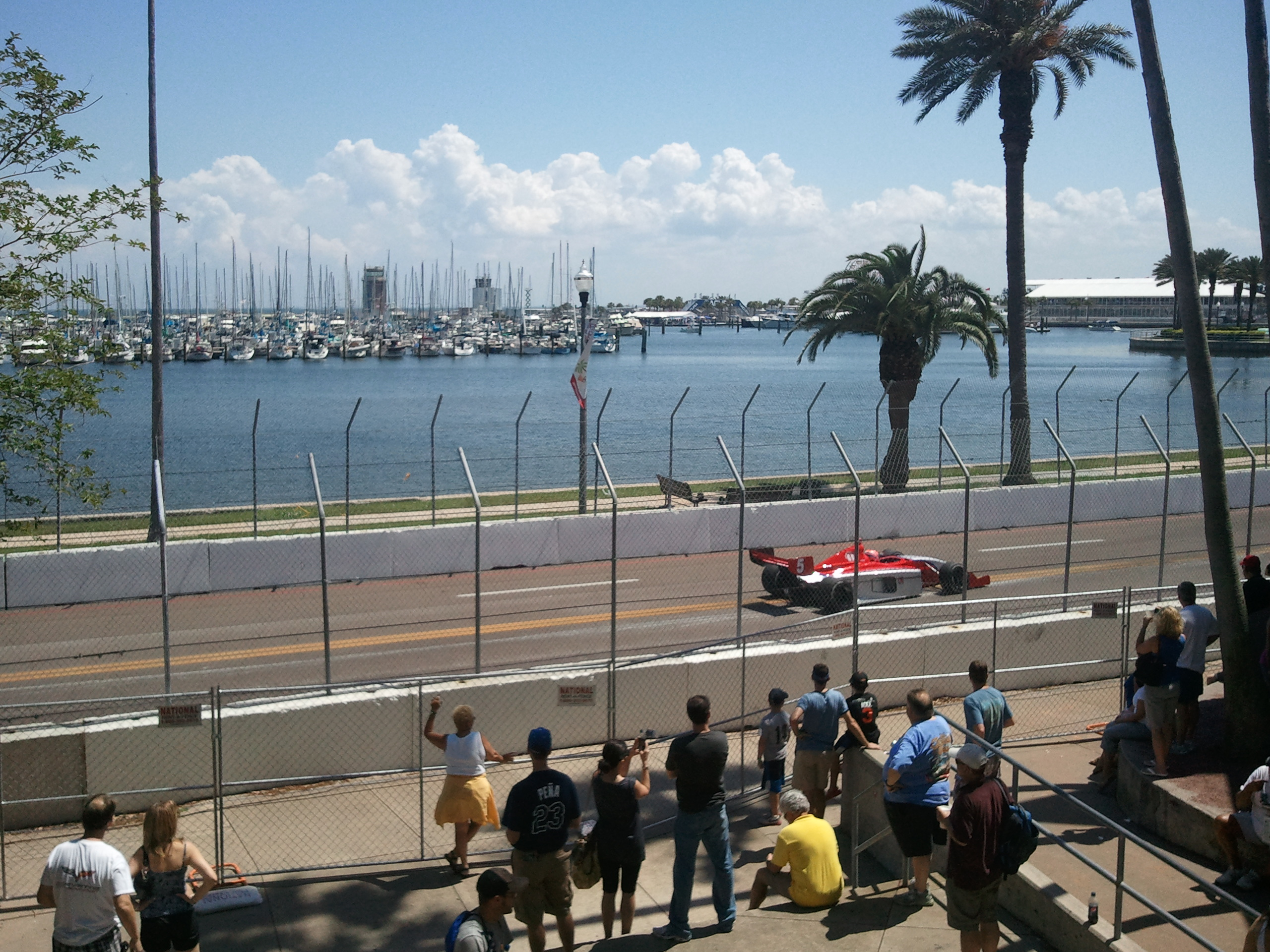
Stefan Wilson driving along the Bay Shore Drive Southeast section during the qualifying race of the Indy Lights 2011.

=== Atlantic Championship Series ===
Season	Date	Winning driver
1985	November 3	Riley Hopkins
1986	November 16	Scott Goodyear
1987	November 7	Johnny O'Connell
1988	October 23	Jocko Cunningham
1989	October 29	Jocko Cunningham
1990	November 4	Brian Till

=== American Le Mans Series ===
Overall winner in bold.

Season	LMP1 Winning Team	LMP2 Winning Team	GT1 Winning Team	GT2 Winning Team	Report
Season	LMP1 Winning Drivers	LMP2 Winning Drivers	GT1 Winning Drivers	GT2 Winning Drivers	Report
2007	**(United States) #1 Audi Sport North America**	(United States) #6 Penske Racing	(United States) #4 Corvette Racing	(United States) #62 Risi Competizione	report
2007	**(Italy) Rinaldo Capello** **(United Kingdom) Allan McNish**	(Germany) Sascha Maassen (Australia) Ryan Briscoe	(United Kingdom) Oliver Gavin (Monaco) Olivier Beretta	(Finland) Mika Salo (Brazil) Jaime Melo	report
2008	(United States) **#2 Audi Sport North America**	(United States) #7 Penske Racing	(United States) #4 Corvette Racing	(United States) #71 Tafel Racing	report
2008	**(Germany) Marco Werner** **(Germany) Lucas Luhr**	(Germany) Timo Bernhard (France) Romain Dumas	(Monaco) Olivier Beretta (United Kingdom) Oliver Gavin	(Germany) Dominik Farnbacher (Germany) Dirk Müller	report
2009	(United States) **#9 Patrón Highcroft Racing**	(Mexico) #15 Lowe's Fernández Racing	No entry	(United States) #45 Flying Lizard Motorsports	report
2009	**(Australia) David Brabham** **(United States) Scott Sharp**	(Mexico) Adrian Fernández (Mexico) Luis Díaz	No entry	(United States) Patrick Long (Germany) Jörg Bergmeister	report

=== Stadium Super Trucks ===
Year	Date	Driver	Ref
2014	March 29	(United States) Robby Gordon	
2014	March 30	(United States) P. J. Jones	
2015	March 28	(United States) Sheldon Creed	
2015	March 29	(United States) Burt Jenner	
2016	March 12	(United States) Sheldon Creed	
2016	March 13	(United States) Keegan Kincaid	
2017	March 11	(United States) Robby Gordon	
2017	March 12	(Australia) Matthew Brabham	
2021	April 24	(United States) Sheldon Creed	
2021	April 25	(United States) Sheldon Creed	

=== SCCA Trans-Am ===
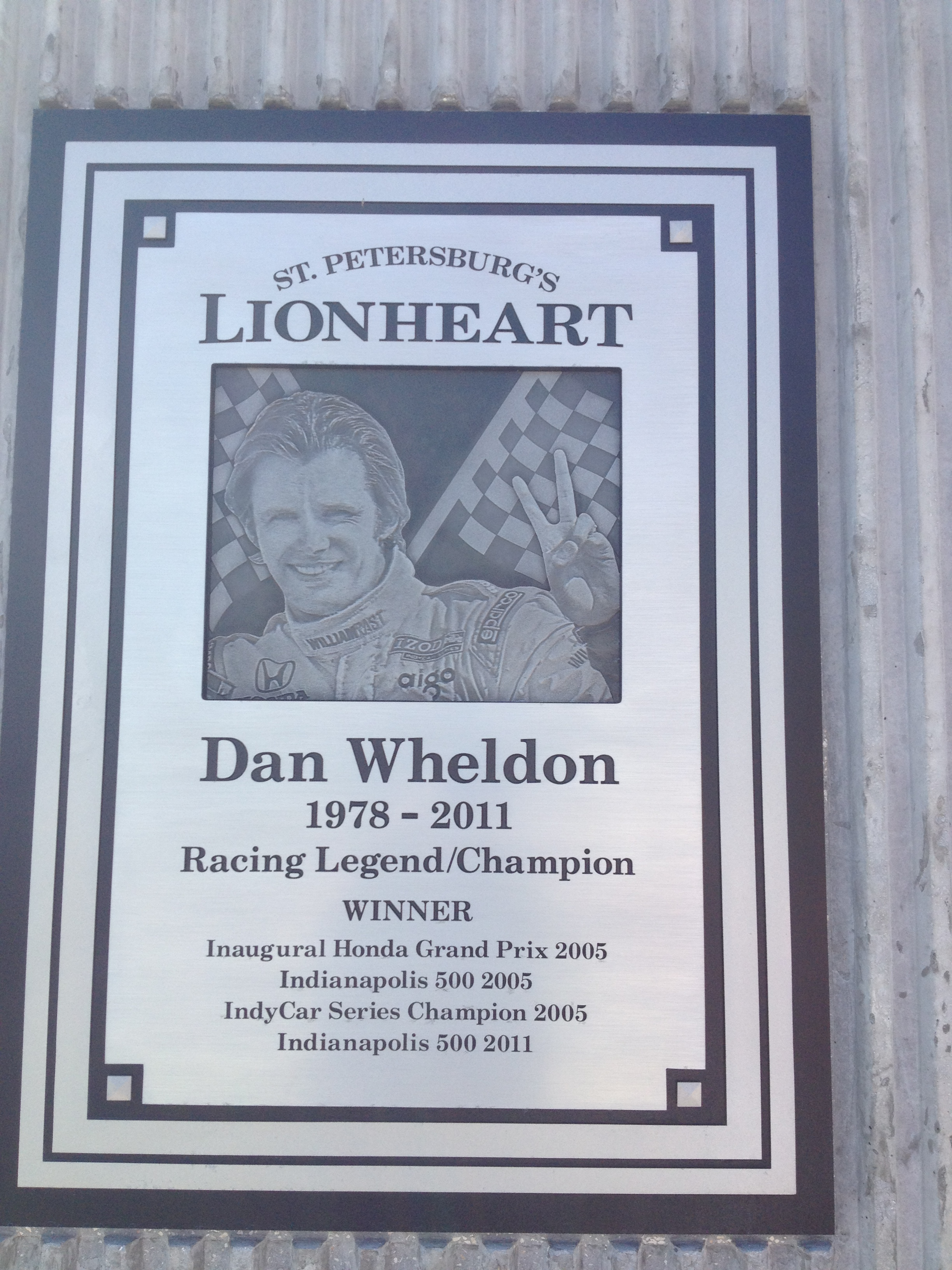
The Dan Wheldon Memorial plaque located next to the Salvador Dali Museum, which also contains the list of winners of the race.

Season	Date	Driver	Team	Car	Race Distance		Race Time	Average Speed	Report
Season	Date	Driver	Team	Car	Laps	Miles (km)	Race Time	Average Speed	Report
1985	November 3	(United States) Willy T. Ribbs	Roush Racing	Mercury Capri	50	100 (160.934)	01:15:05	79.910 mph (128.603 km/h)	Report
1986	November 15	(United States) Pete Halsmer	Roush Racing	Mercury Merkur XR4Ti	50	100 (160.934)	01:15:09	79.838 mph (128.487 km/h)	Report
1987	November 15	(United States) Pete Halsmer	Roush Racing	Mercury Merkur XR4Ti	50	100 (160.934)	02:06:24	47.462 mph (76.383 km/h)	Report
1988	October 23	(West Germany) Walter Röhrl	Audi of America	Audi 200 Quattro	63	125.999 (202.777)	01:38:09	77.0207 mph (123.9528 km/h)	Report
1989	October 29	(United States) Irv Hoerr		Oldsmobile Cutlass	63	125.999 (202.777)	01:42:55	73.459 mph (118.221 km/h)	Report
1990	November 4	(United States) Chris Kneifel		Chevrolet Beretta	63	125.999 (202.777)	01:47:11	70.535 mph (113.515 km/h)	Report
1991–1995, Not held
1996	February 25	(United States) Ron Fellows		Chevrolet Camaro	63	106.470 (171.346)	01:18:13	70.535 mph (113.515 km/h)	Report
1997	February 25	(United States) Tommy Kendall		Ford Mustang	60	101.400 (163.187)	01:14:44	81.405 mph (131.009 km/h)	Report
1998–2002, Not held
2003	February 23	(United States) Scott Pruett		Jaguar XKR	55	99.330 (159.856)	01:16:06	81.405 mph (131.009 km/h)	Report

=== Can-Am ===
- 1985 Lou Sell

=== SCCA Super Vee ===
- 1986 Didier Theys
- 1987 Dave Kudrave
- 1988 Bernard Jourdain
- 1989 Stuart Crow
- 1990 Chris Smith

== Race summaries ==
=== CART Series ===
- 2003: The St. Petersburg Grand Prix was revived with the CART World series. Sébastien Bourdais won the pole and led the first 30 laps. After the first sequence of pit stops, Paul Tracy emerged as the leader. Bourdais tagged the wall on lap 42, which dropped him several laps down. That left Tracy out in front, and he cruised to victory. Tracy led the final 71 laps, and finished over 12 seconds ahead of second place Michel Jourdain Jr.

=== IndyCar Series ===
- 2005: The first ever road course race for the Indy Racing League saw Andretti Green Racing win the pole and sweep the top four positions. Dan Wheldon finished first, with Tony Kanaan second.
- 2006: Dario Franchitti won the pole, but was knocked out early due to mechanical failure. The race finished under the yellow flag after Tomas Scheckter and Buddy Rice hit the barrier with 4 laps to go. Roberto Moreno replaced Ed Carpenter for this race as Ed recovered from his injury's but finished 18th due to steering issues. Hélio Castroneves was the winner.
- 2007: Pole winner Hélio Castroneves led 95 of the 100 laps, holding off Scott Dixon for the win by 0.6007 seconds, the closest finish on a road circuit in IRL history at the time. On the first lap, five cars were involved in a spin, including Tony Kanaan. In practice, Kanaan had crashed his qualified car, but the team made repairs so he could start in the 6th position rather than using a backup. The spin dropped him to the rear of the field. After a series of pit stops under yellow, Dan Wheldon took the lead. On a lap 35 restart, Castroneves bumped Wheldon from behind, and slipped by to take the lead for good. In the best run by a Foyt team in a few seasons, Darren Manning ran as high as third until a late spin dropped him to 13th. After the first lap spin, Tony Kanaan recovered to finish third.
- 2008: Heavy rain in the morning soaked the track, and left considerable standing water. The race was started under 10 laps of caution as the track dried. At the start, Tony Kanaan assumed the lead, but soon was passed by Justin Wilson. The early part of the race saw several spins by several cars, including Danica Patrick, Marco Andretti and Mario Moraes. On the 37th lap after a restart, rookie Graham Rahal was hit from behind by Will Power while running 3rd. He was able to continue. Several cautions slowed the race, including a crash by Ryan Briscoe, and a multi-car incident involving Vítor Meira, Franck Perera, and Townsend Bell. On the restart that followed, Rahal-Letterman Racing driver Ryan Hunter-Reay led Graham Rahal. Rahal got the jump and took the lead into the first turn. With time running out before the two-hour time limit, the race was poised to end before the scheduled distance. On the final restart, just under 4 minutes of racing remained. Rahal held off a charging Hélio Castroneves and won his first race. At 19 years, 93 days old, Rahal became the youngest driver ever to win an Indy-style race, as well as the youngest winner in IndyCar Series history. He broke Marco Andretti's record from 2006. He also became the fourth driver to win an IndyCar Series race in his first start, joining Buzz Calkins, Juan Pablo Montoya and Scott Dixon.
- 2009: On the opening lap, polesitter Graham Rahal was involved in light contact with Tony Kanaan, which damaged his nosecone, and dropped him deep in the field. With 20 laps to go, defending IndyCar champion Scott Dixon crashed out after contact with Hideki Mutoh. With 14 laps to go, Ryan Briscoe took the lead from Justin Wilson on a restart. Briscoe held off Ryan Hunter-Reay to secure the victory.
- 2011: The first race featuring the new double-file restarts takes a toll on the field as drivers adjust. On the first lap, a big collision involving several cars saw Marco Andretti flip over in turn 1, a crash he blamed on Hélio Castroneves. Several other drivers experienced contact on restarts, thinning the field. Dario Franchitti stayed in front for most of the race and won the season opener. Simona de Silvestro garnered the most attention of the later stages of the race, as she hotly challenged Tony Kanaan. Kanaan, who had landed his ride with KV Racing just days earlier, held her off over the final few laps for a surprising third-place finish.
- 2012: Hélio Castroneves won the season-opening event, snapping a winless streak that dates back to Motegi in 2010. It was the first race for the new Dallara DW-12 chassis, and the new turbocharged engine package. Castroneves' victory marked the first win by Chevrolet in the IndyCar Series since 2005. It also marked the first race since the fatal accident of Dan Wheldon. Will Power had the lead from the pole position at the start, but during the first yellow, he ducked into the pits in order to gamble on a fuel strategy. The strategy backfired, and Power was not a factor during the remainder of the race. During the final sequence of pit stops, Castroneves and Scott Dixon were running 1st–2nd. Dixon pitted first on lap 72, and Castroneves pitted on lap later. As the rest of the leaders shuffled through their final pits stops, Castroneves made a bold pass of Dixon on the outside of turn 1 for second place. After the sequence of pit stops was over, Castroneves led the final 26 laps to claim the victory. On his victory lap, Castroneves stopped in turn 10, climbed from his car, and performed his customary "Spider-Man" celebration, climbing the catch fence. He climbed the fence which displayed the street sign "Dan Wheldon Way," which had been designated days earlier by the city of St. Petersburg in the memory of Wheldon.
- 2013: James Hinchcliffe won the first IndyCar race of his career, taking the lead from Hélio Castroneves on a restart on lap 85 of 110. Hinchcliffe held off Castroneves by 1.09 seconds, with Marco Andretti finishing third, passing Simona de Silvestro for the position on the final lap. Will Power dominated the early parts of the race, but dropped to 16th at the finish after contact with J. R. Hildebrand. Dario Franchitti finished last after an early crash, and defending series champion Ryan Hunter-Reay dropped out with mechanical problems.
- 2014: Takuma Sato sat on the pole, but he lost the lead at lap 30 to Will Power. On a restart on lap 82, leader Will Power was bringing the field back to green when an "accordion effect" saw the field check-up on the main stretch. Marco Andretti and rookie Jack Hawksworth made contact and crashed into the inside barrier. Power led the most laps, and held off Ryan Hunter-Reay and Hélio Castroneves for the victory. Polesitter Takuma Sato finished 6th.
- 2015: The season opener at St. Petersburg was also the debut of unique aero kits for Honda and Chevrolet. Apprehension amongst the teams going into the race revolved around the complex, elaborate, and seemingly fragile front wings, and the lack of adequate replacement parts. The concerns were not unfounded, as dozens of on-track contacts throughout the field damaged countless wing components. Will Power won the pole position, leading a Team Penske sweep of the first four positions on the grid. Power took the lead at the start, and led 75 laps. During the final round of pit stops, Juan Pablo Montoya grabbed the lead after he managed a quicker pit stop than Power. In the closing laps, Power chased down Montoya, and narrowed the gap to less than a second with 11 laps to go. Power tried to pass Montoya for the lead in turn 10, but the two cars touched, damaging Power's front wing. Montoya held the lead, and went on to win, his first road course victory in IndyCar racing since 1999.
- 2016: Team Penske driver Will Power qualified for the pole, but was diagnosed with a concussion shortly after the conclusion of the session and was forced to miss the race. Oriol Servià filled in place of Power. Second place qualifier Simon Pagenaud inherited the pole position. Pagenaud led the opening 48 laps before being passed by his teammate Juan Pablo Montoya. Montoya would lead 44 laps en route to his second win in a row at St. Petersburg. Rookie driver Conor Daly also led 15 laps during the race due to pit strategy, but was shuffled outside the top 10 by the end of the race. The race was slowed by only two yellows. The first came on lap 46 when Luca Filippi and Marco Andretti made contact in the first turn. The second came on the restart from the prior caution when Carlos Muñoz made contact with Graham Rahal in turn four, creating a logjam that completely blocked the race course. After the race, Will Power was reevaluated and deemed not to have a concussion, but instead to be suffering from a lingering ear infection. Power would be cleared to race for the following round at Phoenix International Raceway.
- 2017: Sébastien Bourdais crashed during qualifying on his out lap, and was relegated to starting 21st and last. Bourdais charged from last to first, the first win for Dale Coyne Racing since 2014. On lap 20, the first round of green flag pit stops began, with several drivers further down the order, including Sébastien Bourdais and Simon Pagenaud, being some of the first in. However, the race's second full-course caution came out in the middle of this pit sequence on lap 26, when Tony Kanaan and Mikhail Aleshin made contact in turn 4, littering the track with debris. The caution forced the top seven drivers in the race to pit during the caution and lose large amounts of track positions. Following the pit stops, Pagenaud, Bourdais and Marco Andretti were running 1st-2nd-3rd. Bourdais got by Pagenaud on lap 37, and began to pull away. After the second and third rounds of pit stops, Bourdais emerged with a 10-second lead, and comfortably cruised to victory over Pagenaud and Scott Dixon.
- 2020: In a season shortened by the COVID-19 pandemic, the new Roger Penske led IndyCar was forced to move the St. Petersburg Grand Prix from the season opener to the season finale. The race proved to be a championship deciding showdown between Scott Dixon and Josef Newgarden, the latter of which won the 2019 race and the former never having won at St. Petersburg. Dixon had to finish eighth or better to win the championship, while Newgarden had to both win the race and finish at least nine positions better than Dixon to clinch the championship. Although Penske's Will Power qualified for a record ninth pole at St. Petersburg it was Andretti Autosport's Alexander Rossi who led most of the race before he suffered an unforced error and crashed into the walls. In the final stint Newgarden managed to pass Pato O'Ward for the race lead, forcing the normally calm Dixon to drive aggressively into third position and finish there to win his sixth IndyCar championship.
- 2021: St. Petersburg returned in 2021 to its more traditional early season slot but was instead placed as the second race of the season rather than the season opener. Throughout the weekend Andretti Autosport's Colton Herta proved to be the fastest driver and ended up dominating the race, winning from pole position. Behind him Penske drivers Josef Newgarden and Simon Pagenaud edged out Jack Harvey of Meyer Shank Racing to round out the podium.
- 2022: For the first time in two years the St. Petersburg GP returned to its season opening slot. The Grand Prix was hosted on 27 February, the earliest date the Grand Prix has ever been hosted and the earliest season start date for the IndyCar Series. The starting grid was also the largest in the history of the event with twenty six entries, including twenty five full time cars and drivers. Team Penske's second year driver and former Supercars champion Scott McLaughlin out qualified Romain Grosjean, Simon Pagenaud, Will Power, Colton Herta, and Rinus VeeKay for the pole position, his first in IndyCar. McLaughlin used a two stop fuel saving strategy to lead most of the race, his strategy holding up even through a yellow caused on lap 26 by rookie David Malukas. In the closing laps 2021 champion Alex Palou, who used the same strategy as McLaughlin, began to hunt McLaughlin down for the lead. McLaughlin beat Palou's attempt at an overcut in the final series of pit stops and conserved enough push to pass to use it to both hold off Palou and work through traffic to take his first IndyCar win. Palou would finish in second place, his best finish on a street circuit. Will Power would round out the podium in third place.
- 2023: St. Petersburg again saw a record setting of entries in the Grand Prix, with 27 full time entries. Romain Grosjean qualified on pole. A first lap five car pileup threw an early red flag before racing resumed. At lap 36 Scott McLaughlin over cut Grosjean for the lead. McLaughlin held on through another series of cautions before being caught up in an incident on lap 78 between himself and Grosjean, ending Grosjean's race and putting himself a lap down. Pato O'Ward cycled to the front and led the closing laps before an overboost issue with three laps to go caused him to lose control, handing the lead to reigning Indianapolis 500 winner Marcus Ericsson. Ericsson held on to win the incident filled race, which saw almost half the field retire due to crashes. O'Ward and Scott Dixon finished second and third respectively.
- 2024: The 2024 edition of the St. Petersburg Grand Prix would go down as one of the most controversial races in IndyCar history. Josef Newgarden qualified on pole, his first pole position at St. Petersburg and his first pole position in over a year. Newgarden led the entire race to cruise to an easy victory, only challenged by Pato O'Ward on the day. However, Newgarden was later disqualified and stripped of the race victory following IndyCar's discovery of illegal software manipulation by Team Penske that allowed Newgarden, Scott McLaughlin, and Will Power to use push to pass on the restarts of the race. In addition to Newgarden's disqualification, McLaughlin was stripped of his third-place finish and Power was docked ten points in the championship standings. The victory was given to Pato O'Ward by default.
- 2025: 2025 marked the first race at St. Petersburg in both the hybrid era of IndyCar and the first to be broadcast on Fox. Scott McLaughlin qualified on pole. On lap one Will Power rear ended Nolan Siegel and took out the two of them along with Rahal Letterman Lanigan rookie Louis Foster, throwing an early yellow. Racing resumed on lap 7, with the first half of the race a fight between McLaughlin, Colton Herta, and Christian Lundgaard. Herta and McLaughlin faded away after poor pitstop, letting Scott Dixon and Josef Newgarden by. Dixon was jumped for the lead on lap 72 by Alex Palou via an undercut, and Palou held on to win the race to give Chip Ganassi his first win at St. Petersburg. After a fierce multi lap battle Dixon ultimately prevailed for second place, while Newgarden finished third and ran out of fuel just after crossing the finish line.

== Notes ==
=== Works cited ===
- Honda Grand Prix of St. Petersburg's website
- City has had false starts with racing
- St. Petersburg course layouts maps via TheRacingLine.net
- Florida State Fairgrounds course map via TheRacingLine.net

Preceded by IndyCar Monterey Grand Prix (last season)	IndyCar Series; Grand Prix of St. Petersburg	Succeeded by Good Ranchers 250
