= St. Petersburg Street Circuit =

Street course used by motor races in downtown St. Petersburg, U.S.

- Grand Prix Circuit (2003–present)
- Location: St. Petersburg, Florida, United States
- Coordinates: 27°45′59″N 82°37′45″W
- FIA Grade: 2
- Opened: 1985
- Major events: Current: IndyCar Series; Grand Prix of St. Petersburg (2003, 2005–present); NASCAR Truck Series; OnlyBulls Green Flag 150 (2026); Former: Stadium Super Trucks (2014–2017, 2021); American Le Mans Series (2007–2009); Trans-Am Series (1985–1991, 1996–1997, 2003); Can-Am (1985)
- Website: https://gpstpete.com/

Grand Prix Circuit (2003–present)
- Length: 1.800 mi (2.897 km)
- Turns: 14
- Race lap record: 1:00.6795 ( (United States) Josef Newgarden, Dallara IR-18, 2024, IndyCar)

Grand Prix Circuit (1996–1997)
- Length: 1.690 mi (2.720 km)
- Turns: 8
- Race lap record: 1:14.800 ( (United States) Tommy Kendall, Ford Mustang, 1997, Trans-Am)

Grand Prix Circuit (1986–1990)
- Length: 2.000 mi (3.219 km)
- Turns: 11
- Race lap record: 1:17.440 ( (United States) Scott Pruett, Merkur XR4Ti, 1987, Trans-Am)

Original Grand Prix Circuit (1985)
- Length: 2.000 mi (3.219 km)
- Turns: 9
- Race lap record: 1:23.020 ( (United States) Peter Greenfield, Ralt RT4, 1985, Can-Am)

The St. Petersburg Street Circuit is a street circuit in St. Petersburg, Florida, United States, that currently hosts both the NTT IndyCar Series (Firestone Grand Prix of St. Petersburg) and the NASCAR Truck Series (OnlyBulls Green Flag 150).

The race takes place on a street circuit, utilizing downtown streets, and one runway of Albert Whitted Airport. The event dates back to 1985, with IndyCars first competing in 2003 and the NASCAR Truck Series first competing in 2026.

== Background ==
The inaugural 1985 event was organized by William T. McVey, president of the McBri Corporation in Tampa, Florida and a member of IMSA and the SCCA. The SCCA Trans-Am Series held a race on a St. Petersburg downtown waterfront circuit from 1985 to 1990. Can-Am also competed in 1985. Local residents and businesses complained about noise, and the event was eventually put on hiatus. Driver Jim Fitzgerald was killed in a crash during the 1987 race.

From 1996 to 1997, the St. Petersburg race was revived on a different course around Tropicana Field (about one mile west of the original waterfront course). Along with the Trans-Am Series, support races included USF2000, Speed World Challenge, Pro SRF and Barber Dodge. The event subsequently went again on hiatus for several years.

In 2003, the event was revived again for the CART Championship Series. A new, modified version of the original 1985 waterfront circuit was created. For 2004, the event was cancelled due to a dispute between the promoters, furthermore, the bankruptcy and liquidation of the CART series into the new Champ Car World Series saw a shakeup of the calendar. When the race returned in 2005, it switched to the IndyCar Series, marking the first non-oval event for the Indy Racing League. In 2007, the race weekend was expanded to include an American Le Mans Series event.

In 2026, the NASCAR Truck Series joined IndyCar with their own event.

=== Course ===
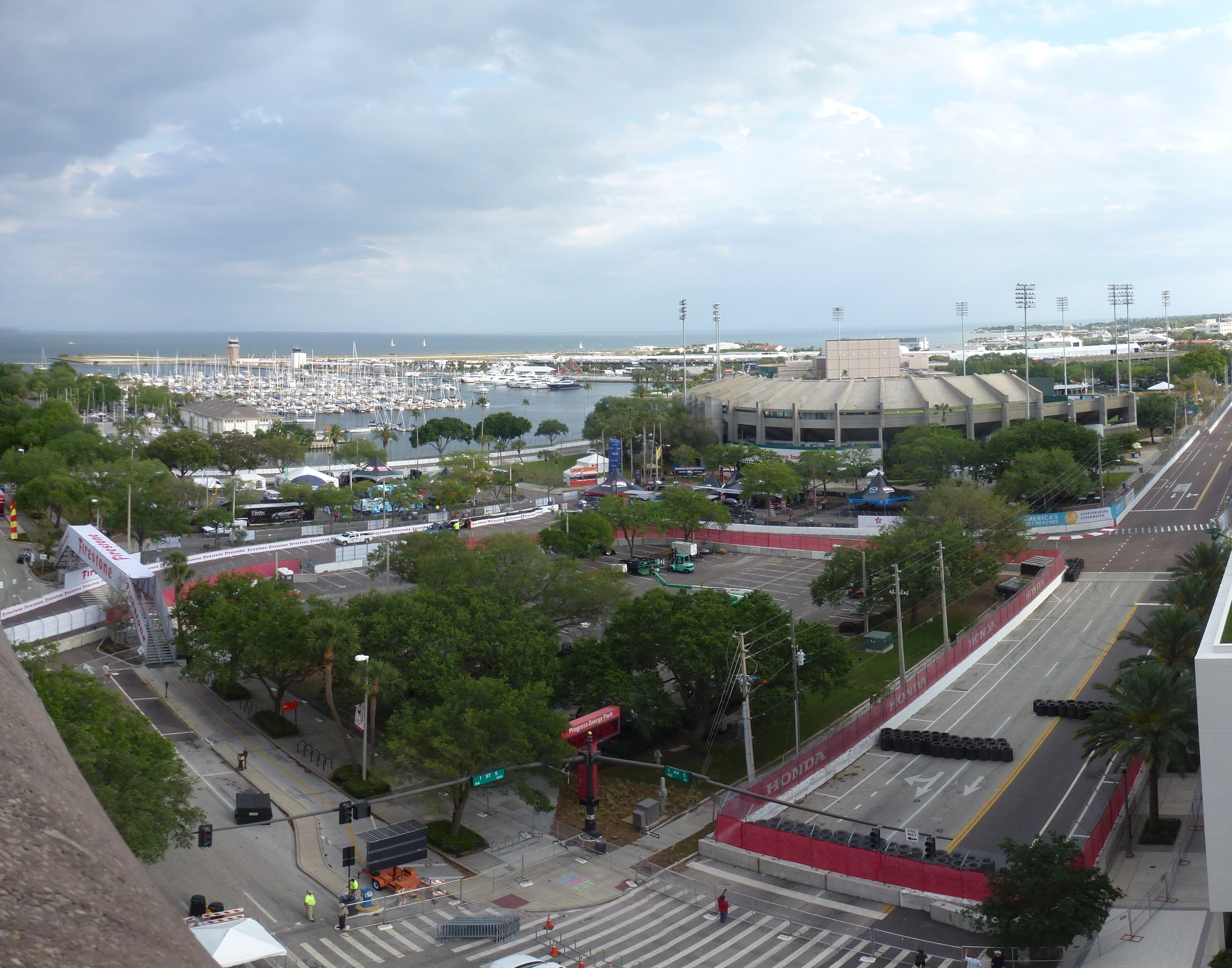
The section of the 2012 Honda Grand Prix of St. Petersburg that curves through the Al Lang Stadium parking lot

The Streets of St. Petersburg course is a street circuit connecting existing roads with one of the two runways of Albert Whitted Airport in St. Petersburg, Florida. It also dips into the parking lot at Al Lang Stadium. St. Petersburg is classified as an FIA Grade Two circuit.

==== First Bayfront course ====
The original 1985 Trans-Am course utilized a similar layout to the course used today. For the first year the track actually ran out to the pier, made a 180 degree turn and returned. At the end of Bayshore Drive, rather than diverting off to the airport runways, the course circled around 5th Avenue Southeast around Bayfront Arena, and the start/finish line was located just south of the paddock (the parking lot of Bayfront Arena). In addition, the old course traveled further up Beach Drive Northeast, all the way to 5th Avenue Northeast. 5th Ave. NE was a very narrow segment. The course came south down Bayshore Drive Northeast, and passed by The Pier.

==== Tropicana Field course ====
The second course at Tropicana Field was located about a mile west of the waterfront location. The circuit used the roads around the perimeter of the parking lot of the stadium.

==== Second Bayfront course ====
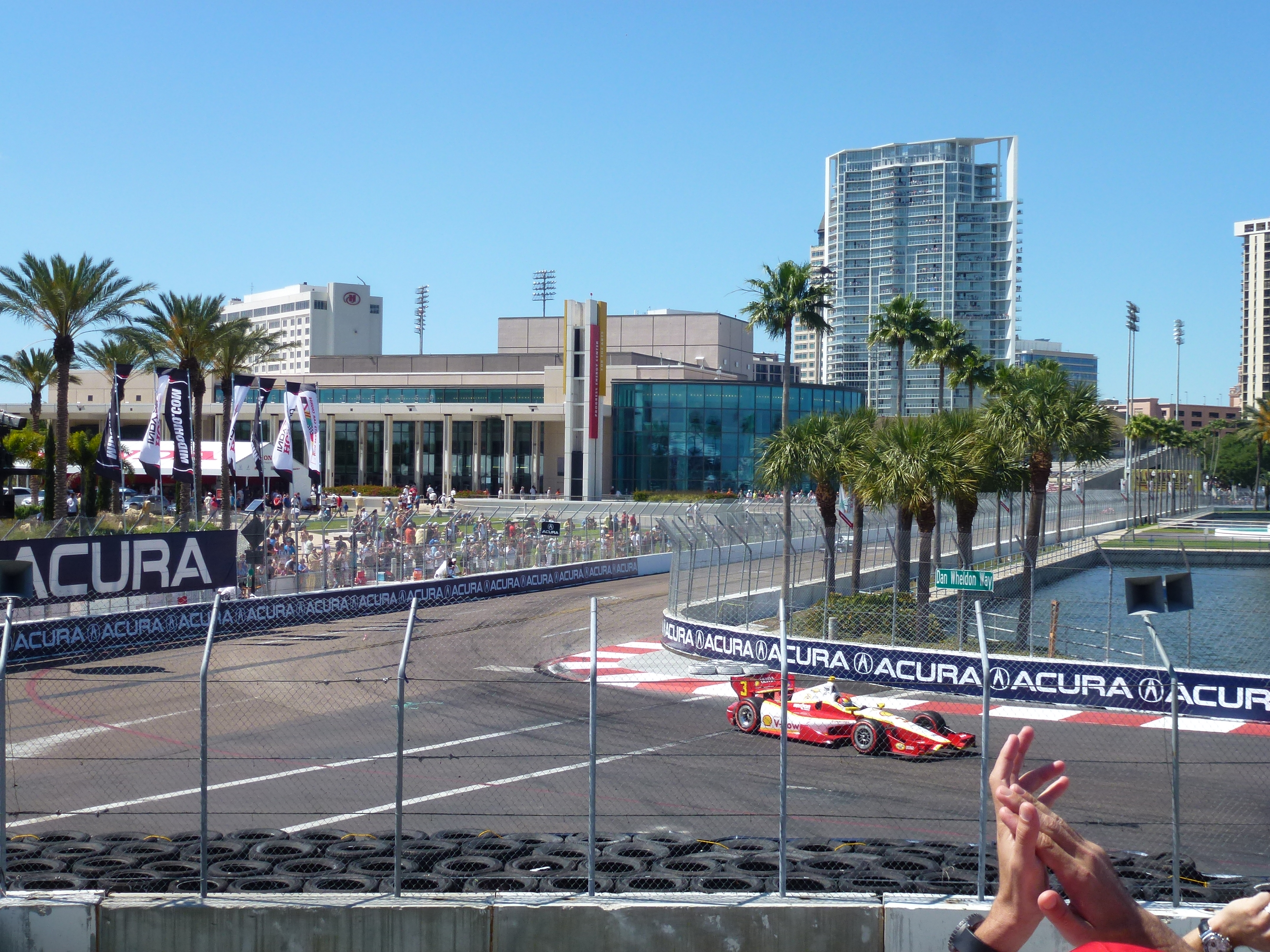
Helio Castroneves approaches Dan Wheldon Way (Turn 10) on the final lap of the 2012 Honda Grand Prix of St. Petersburg

When the course was reconfigured, the northbound segment turned at Central Avenue instead, and did not go as far as The Pier. The pits and main straight were moved to the airport, and a purpose-built paddock area was paved next to the runway. The Albert Whitted Park was reconfigured/relocated, and the entire course layout was repaved.

The pits and paddock areas, as well as link from Dan Wheldon Way to the airport runway (turns 11, 12, and 13) were constructed specifically for the circuit in 2003, and are considered permanent features of the otherwise temporary circuit.

After the crash at the 2011 IZOD IndyCar World Championship that killed Snell Isle resident Dan Wheldon, who won the 2005 race and two Indianapolis 500 titles, the straight following Turn 10 (the turn from Bayshore Drive to Albert Whitted Park) was renamed "Dan Wheldon Way" in his memory. The sign and commemorative plaque was unveiled by St. Petersburg mayor Bill Foster on March 6, 2012. A permanent Dan Wheldon Memorial is located next to the Salvador Dalí Museum on the opposite side of Turn 10, where race winners have their names placed on the memorial.

== Layout history ==
Grand Prix Circuit (1986–1990)

Grand Prix Circuit (1996–1997)

Grand Prix Circuit (2003–present)

== Events ==
Current

- February: NASCAR Truck Series OnlyBulls Green Flag 150
- March: IndyCar Series Grand Prix of St. Petersburg, Indy NXT, USF2000 Championship, Mazda MX-5 Cup

Future

- USF Pro 2000 Championship (2010–2025, 2027)

Former

- American Le Mans Series
  - Sports Car Challenge of St. Petersburg (2007–2009)
- Atlantic Championship Series (1985–1990)
- Barber Pro Series (1996–1997, 2003)
- Can-Am (1985)
- Ferrari Challenge North America (2012)
- GT America Series (2022–2023)
- GT4 America Series (2019)
- IMSA VP Racing SportsCar Challenge (2024)
- Pirelli World Challenge (1990, 1996–1997, 2005–2006, 2010–2018)
- Porsche GT3 Cup Challenge USA (2020)
- SCCA Formula Super Vee (1986–1990)
- SCCA RaceTruck Challenge (1987–1990)
- Stadium Super Trucks (2014–2017, 2021)
- Trans-Am Series (1985–1991, 1996–1997, 2003)

== Lap records ==
As of February 2026, the fastest official race lap records at the St. Petersburg Street Circuit are listed as:

Category	Time	Driver	Vehicle	Event
Grand Prix Circuit (2003–present): 1.800 mi (2.897 km)
IndyCar	1:00.6795	Josef Newgarden	Dallara IR-18	2024 Firestone Grand Prix of St. Petersburg
CART	1:01.825	Sébastien Bourdais	Lola B02/00	2003 Grand Prix of St. Petersburg
LMP2	1:04.340	Ryan Briscoe	Porsche RS Spyder Evo	2007 Sports Car Challenge of St. Petersburg
LMP1	1:04.725	Allan McNish	Audi R10 TDI	2007 Sports Car Challenge of St. Petersburg
Indy NXT	1:04.7732	Dennis Hauger	Dallara IL-15	2025 Indy NXT by Firestone Grand Prix of St. Petersburg
Indy Pro 2000	1:08.1141	Sting Ray Robb	Tatuus PM-18	2020 Indy Pro 2000 Grand Prix of St. Petersburg
GT1	1:09.770	Oliver Gavin	Chevrolet Corvette C6.R	2008 Sports Car Challenge of St. Petersburg
LMP3	1:10.872	Jagger Jones	Duqueine D-08	2024 St. Petersburg IMSA VP Racing SportsCar Challenge round
USF2000	1:11.8416	Jack Jeffers	Tatuus USF-22	2025 Foundation Building Materials Grand Prix of St. Petersburg
GT2	1:12.699	Tomáš Enge	Ferrari F430 GTC	2007 Sports Car Challenge of St. Petersburg
GT3	1:13.642	Justin Wetherill	Ferrari 488 GT3 Evo 2020	2022 St. Petersburg GT America round
Barber Pro	1:13.930	Dan Di Leo	Reynard 98E	2003 St. Petersburg Barber Pro round
Trans-Am	1:14.634	Scott Pruett	Jaguar XKR	2003 St. Petersburg Trans-Am round
Porsche Carrera Cup	1:15.016	Jeff Kingsley	Porsche 911 (991 II) GT3 Cup	2020 St. Petersburg Porsche GT3 Cup Challenge USA round
GT4	1:17.008	Jesse Lazare	McLaren Artura GT4	2024 St. Petersburg IMSA VP Racing SportsCar Challenge round
NASCAR Truck	1:18.149	Layne Riggs	Ford F-150	2026 OnlyBulls Green Flag 150
SRO GT2	1:18.881	C.J. Moses	Audi R8 LMS GT2	2022 St. Petersburg GT America round
GTS	1:21.777	Peter Cunningham	Acura TSX	2012 St. Petersburg Pirelli World Challenge round
Mazda MX-5 Cup	1:24.259	Jeremy Fletcher	Mazda MX-5 (ND)	2025 St. Petersburg Mazda MX-5 Cup round
TC	1:25.101	Tristan Hebert	Volkswagen GLI	2012 St. Petersburg Pirelli World Challenge round
Grand Prix Circuit (1996–1997): 1.690 mi (2.720 km)
Trans-Am	1:14.800	Tommy Kendall	Ford Mustang	1997 St. Petersburg Trans-Am round
Grand Prix Circuit (1986–1990): 2.000 mi (3.219 km)
Trans-Am	1:17.440	Scott Pruett	Merkur XR4Ti	1987 St. Petersburg Trans-Am round
Grand Prix Circuit (1985): 2.000 mi (3.219 km)
Can-Am	1:23.020	Peter Greenfield	Ralt RT4	1985 Can-Am Challenge at St. Petersburg
Trans-Am	1:27.836	Willy T. Ribbs	Mercury Capri	1985 St. Petersburg Trans-Am round
