= James Whitted =

American aviator

James Albert Whitted
- James Albert Whitted, ca.1917–1918
- Born: February 14, 1893
- Died: August 19, 1923 (aged 30)
- Occupations: Aviator and pilot

Lt. James Albert Whitted (born February 14, 1893 – August 19, 1923), was an American aviator from St. Petersburg, Florida. During his career, Whitted was an engineer, an instructor at the Naval flight school and ran a commercial air service business. Whitted was killed in a plane crash near Pensacola, Florida in 1923. The Albert Whitted Airport in St. Petersburg was named after him in 1928.

== Early life ==
James Albert Whitted was born in St. Petersburg, Florida on February 14, 1893. Whitted's father, Thomas Albert Whitted came to the Pinellas County area with his parents from Boone, Iowa in 1878. Albert's mother, formerly Julia Phillips, was the daughter of the Long Key settler Zephaniah Phillips. In 1884, after their marriage, Thomas and Julia moved to what is now Gulfport, Florida. There they built a house and had nine children, four of which died at an early age. The third child born was James Albert Whitted.

At a young age, Whitted attended local schools in St. Petersburg. He also spent time learning mechanics from his father, who was himself a mechanic. According to Eric Whitted, Albert's nephew, "when Albert was a teenager, he was a projectionist in the old Cameo Theatre. Back in those days, all movie projectors were hand-cranked; because he was constantly reading, Albert rigged up a way to run the projector with a bicycle wheel and motor so he could read. People were really pleased because the film was running much more smoothly. But when his boss came in and saw what he was doing, he fired him." When Whitted graduated from St. Petersburg High School, he established St. Petersburg's first motorcycle shop.

== Aviation career ==
Albert Whitted in uniform, ca. 1921

In 1910, Whitted moved to New Haven, Connecticut for a brief period where he took up motorcycle racing. While in New Haven, Whitted developed a strong interest in aviation. He acquired a fractional ownership in a Curtis land machine, which he had helped to build.

=== Military ===
Early on in World War I, Albert Whitted enlisted in the aviation corps of the US Army. He was sent to Pensacola in March 1917. In August 1917, he was qualified as a naval aviator and received his pilot's number 179. He is classed as one of the first 250 pioneer pilots of the US Navy. By August 1918, Whitted had become an instructor in small seaplane flying. He later instructed on larger sea planes such as the H-12 type. On September 25, 1918, Whitted was promoted to first lieutenant and was made chief instructor in advanced flying. Some of Whitted's pupils were on the famous trans-Atlantic voyage with Commander Read.

Whitted remained in the Navy for a short period after World War I. During this period, he and a student aviator crashed their plane in Pensacola Bay, falling over 1,000 ft. Whitted suffered a bruise on his nose and his student passenger suffered a broken arm. The crash was attributed to the student. In 1919, Whitted received his commission as a junior lieutenant and was placed on inactive duty.

=== Commercial ===
After being discharged from the Navy in 1919 Albert moved back from Pensacola with his wife and dog. Albert also brought with him commercial aviation to the city of St. Petersburg. Although it was Tony Jannus who flew the world's first scheduled air transportation flight between St. Petersburg and Tampa in 1914, it is Albert Whitted who local historians credit with truly introducing the people of St. Petersburg to flying. Albert began his commercial aviation career out of a hangar on the Vinoy Basin in St. Petersburg. He took passengers up for short plane rides in his seaplane, the "Bluebird", for flight lessons and to enjoy the view. Thousands of residents and tourists went up with him in the next few years.

Eric Whitted recalled tales of a newspaper being floated in the bay and Albert swooping down with his seaplane and cutting the paper in half. Albert also carried mail up the Mississippi River for some time. In true daredevil style, according to Eric Whitted, he flew his plane under the arched bridges that spanned the Mississippi at the time, terrifying the people crossing the bridges. In the summer of 1921, Albert designed and built a larger and faster plane in Pensacola which he brought back home to St. Petersburg in the winter. The plane that Albert built was an experimental airplane which had a four-bladed propeller. He would name this plane the "Falcon".

== Death ==
On August 19, 1923, Whitted crashed his plane outside Pensacola and was killed along with four passengers. He was flying about two hundred feet above the Gulf of Mexico when a loose propeller of his famed "Falcon" cut through the fuselage and severed wires needed to control the plane. Whitted was unable to regain control, and the plane hit the water five minutes after takeoff, killing all but one passenger.

The only woman aboard the flight was found floating by William E. King, a longtime friend and associate of the aviator, and died upon being pulled into his boat. The other passengers and Albert were all pinned beneath the plane. It took several diving attempts to pull the men from the plane. The accident happened about forty miles east of Pensacola near Camp Walton on the Santa Rosa sound. The Falcon was Whitted's pride and joy, having been designed and built by him. He had still been making changes to its design a short time before its crash. A new motor had just been installed at St. Petersburg before he left for Pensacola and new wings had also been added at that time. The plane was able to reach a speed of 100 mph and was said to have put an enormous strain on its propeller.

Whitted's funeral was held at his father-in-law's home in Pensacola, and his body was interred at St. Michael's Cemetery. During his commercial air service business, which he held with his brother Clarence, Whitted had never had an accident and had carried more than 5000 passengers.

== Marriage and children ==
On November 14, 1918, Whitted married Frances Louise Brent (1894 - 1995) from Pensacola, Florida. She was the youngest daughter of F. C. Brent. The couple were married at the North Baylen Street home of her older brother Thomas and his wife. The wedding was a "quiet affair" with family only, owing to the recent death of Frances' aunt Mary Ella Brent about ten days before. An uncle, Daniel Gonzalez Brent, died about two weeks later. After their wedding, Frances and Albert lived at the Brent family home in Pensacola. They also lived in St. Petersburg, where Albert had been born, moving back and forth between the two cities. By the end of 1922, shortly before Albert's death, the couple had two daughters, Catherine Eugenia "Jean", and Frances Louise "Fanty".

After Albert's death in 1923, Frances lived as a widow in the Brent family house with her and Albert's two daughters, as well as a few of her brothers and sisters. While living there she met another Naval officer, Harold Foster Fick, from St. Joseph, Missouri. Frances remarried to Harold Fick in 1927.

== Honors and tributes ==
On 12 October 1928, St. Petersburg's city's airport, known until then as Cook-Springstead tracks, was renamed Albert Whitted Airport. Soon after its opening, Goodyear Tire and Rubber Company chose Albert Whitted Airport as a location for one of its blimps, and the St. Petersburg City Council constructed a blimp hangar at the site at a cost of $33,062.

In 1934 the Civil Works Administration (forerunner of WPA) initiated local projects, among them the expansion of Albert Whitted Airport. It was used in World War II as a training facility.
