= 1984 Trans-Am Series =

American sports car racing competition

Seasons
- ← 1983 1985 →

The 1984 Budweiser Trans-Am Championship was the nineteenth running of the Sports Car Club of America's premier series.

== Results ==
Round	Date	Circuit	Winning driver	Winning vehicle
1	6 May	Road Atlanta	(United States) Darin Brassfield	Chevrolet Corvette
2	20 May	Summit Point	(United States) Bob Lobenberg	Pontiac Trans-Am
3	3 June	Sears Point	(United States) Greg Pickett	Mercury Capri
4	16 June	Portland	(United States) Greg Pickett	Mercury Capri
5	23 June	Detroit	(United States) Tom Gloy	Mercury Capri
6	3 July	Daytona	(United States) Willy T. Ribbs	Mercury Capri
7	22 July	Brainerd	(United States) Willy T. Ribbs	Mercury Capri
8	5 August	Road America	(Canada) Richard Spenard	Chevrolet Corvette
9	19 August	Watkins Glen	(United States) Willy T. Ribbs	Mercury Capri
10	2 September	Trois-Rivières	(United States) Tom Gloy	Mercury Capri
11	9 September	Mosport	(United States) Paul Miller	Porsche Turbo Carrera
12	23 September	Seattle	(United States) Greg Pickett	Mercury Capri
13	30 September	Sears Point	(United States) Greg Pickett	Mercury Capri
14	7 October	Riverside	(United States) Darin Brassfield	Chevrolet Corvette
15	28 October	Green Valley	(United States) Willy T. Ribbs	Mercury Capri
16	11 November	Caesars Palace	(United States) Tom Gloy	Mercury Capri

== Championship standings (Top 10) ==
Pos	Driver	Points
1	(United States) Tom Gloy	225
2	(United States) Greg Pickett	188
3	(United States) Willy T. Ribbs	155
4	(United States) Wally Dallenbach Jr.	142
5	(United States) Bob Lobenberg	135
6	(United States) Darin Brassfield	120
7	(United States) Jim Miller	110
8	(United Kingdom) David Hobbs	106
9	(United States) Paul Miller	79
10	(United States) Jim Derhaag	59
