= Willy T. Ribbs =

American racing driver (born 1955)

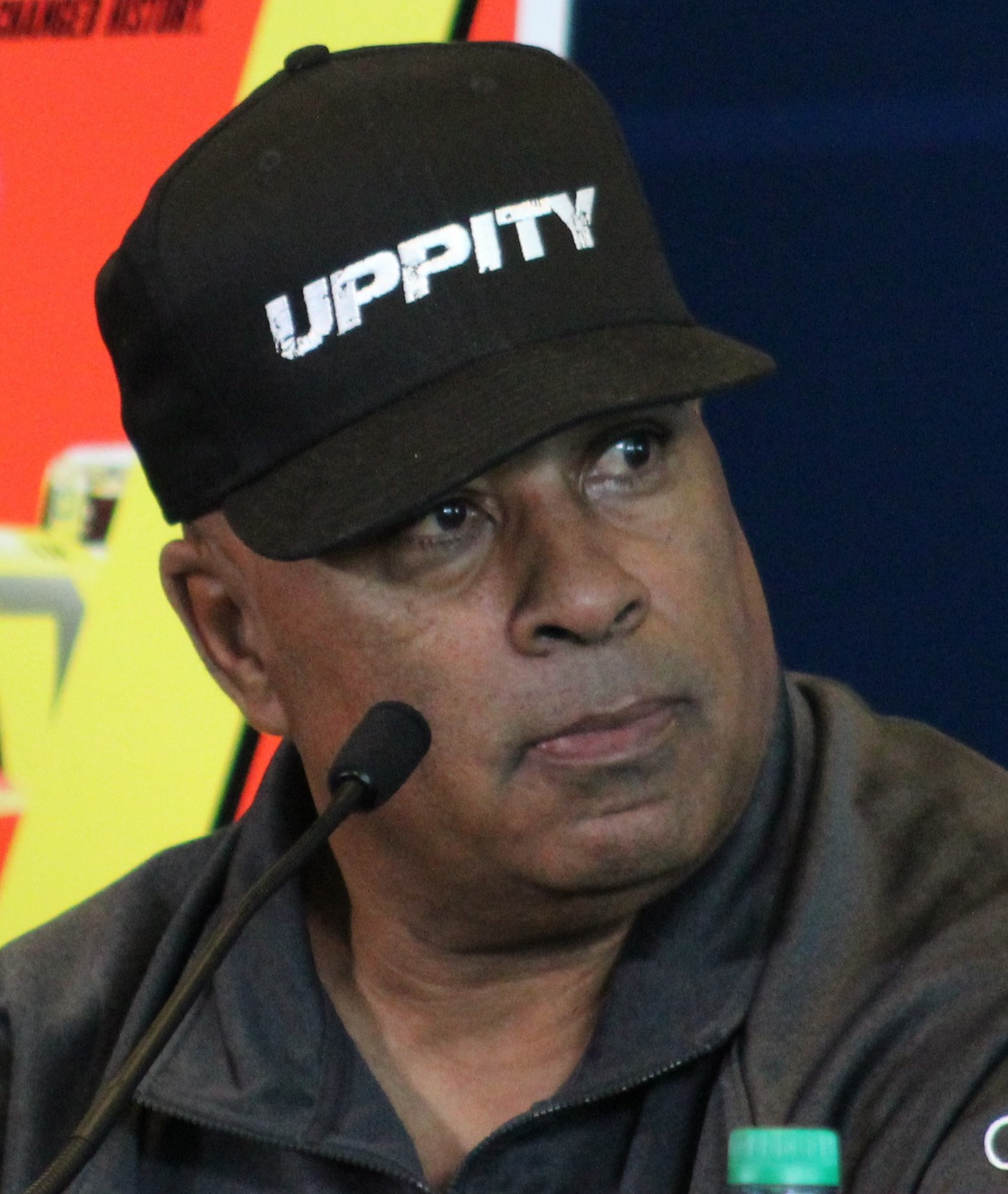
- Ribbs at the 2018 Indy 500
- Born: William Theodore Ribbs Jr. January 3, 1955 (age 71); San Jose, California, U.S.
- Achievements: 1976 Formula Ford Dunlop Championship Champion
- Awards: 1983 Trans-Am Series Rookie of the Year

NASCAR Cup Series career
- 4 races run over 1 year
- Best finish: 65th (1986)
- First race: 1986 First Union 400 (North Wilkesboro)
- Last race: 1986 The Budweiser at The Glen (Watkins Glen)
Wins	Top tens	Poles
0	0	0

NASCAR FedEx Freight Truck Series career
- 23 races run over 1 year
- Best finish: 16th (2001)
- First race: 2001 Florida Dodge Dealers 250 (Daytona)
- Last race: 2001 Auto Club 200 (California)
Wins	Top tens	Poles
0	0	0

IndyCar Series career
- 1 race run over 1 year
- Team: McCormack Motorsports (1999)
- Best finish: 47th – 1999
- First race: 1999 Vegas.com 500 (Las Vegas)
Wins	Podiums	Poles
0	0	0

Champ Car career
- 46 races run over 5 years
- Years active: 1990–1994
- Teams: Raynor Motorsports (1990); Walker Racing (1991–1994)
- Best finish: 17th (1991)
- First race: 1990 Toyota Grand Prix of Long Beach (Long Beach)
- Last race: 1994 Toyota Grand Prix of Monterey (Laguna Seca)
Wins	Podiums	Poles
0	0	0
- Statistics up to date as of March 20, 2012.

William Theodore Ribbs Jr. (born January 3, 1955) is an American former race car driver, racing owner, and sport shooter known for being the first African-American man to have tested a Formula One car (he did so in 1986) and to compete in the Indianapolis 500 (tested in 1985, raced in 1991 and 1993). Ribbs competed in many forms of auto racing, including the Trans-Am Series, IndyCar, Champ Car, IMSA, and the NASCAR Cup Series and NASCAR Craftsman Truck Series. After retiring, he became a sport shooter in the National Sporting Clays Association.

Ribbs saw his most success in the Trans-Am Series, winning seventeen races while driving for Dan Gurney and Jack Roush.

== Biography ==
Ribbs grew up in San Jose, California as one of five children in a middle-class family. His father William "Bunny" Ribbs, Sr. was a plumbing contractor and amateur sportscar racer and was friends and neighbors with Indy Car driver Joe Leonard. Ribbs was nearly killed at eight years old when an out-of-control car at a race struck him. As a teenager, Ribbs would take his car out in the California mountains at high speeds, frequently stopped by police for reckless driving. Ribbs proceeded to enter a racing school at the age of 21. Following his graduation from high school in 1975, Ribbs moved to Europe to compete. In 1977, Ribbs won the Dunlop/Autosport Star of Tomorrow FF1600 in his first year of competition, winning six races in eleven starts with Mike Eastick's Scorpion Racing School. Ribbs returned to the United States in 1978, making his debut in the Formula Atlantic open-wheel series at Long Beach on April 1, finishing 10th after running as high as 4th.

In May 1978, Charlotte Motor Speedway president and race promoter Humpy Wheeler entered Ribbs to drive a NASCAR Winston Cup car in the World 600 at Charlotte in an effort to attract black fans to his racetrack. Ribbs was partnered with veteran crew chief Harry Hyde. After being initially rejected by track officials due to a lack of stock car experience, and when the Dodge Magnum Ribbs was supposed to drive was committed to another driver, Wheeler set Ribbs up with owner Will Cronkite and a Bud Moore Engineering-built Ford Torino. Cronkite replaced him with future champion Dale Earnhardt.

Ribbs returned to the Formula Atlantic series in 1981, winning the pole in the Long Beach Formula Atlantic race in 1982. The following year, Ribbs moved to the SCCA Trans-Am Series, driving Chevrolet Camaros with sponsorship from Budweiser. Ribbs won five races and was honored as Pro Rookie of the Year, while his teammate David Hobbs won the series championship. Ribbs won four races in 1984 driving factory-backed Mercury Capris for Roush Racing.

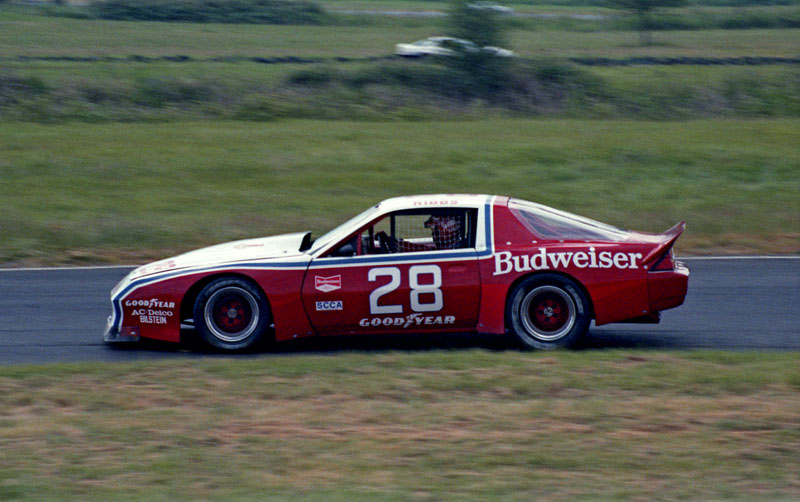
Ribbs won the SCCA Trans-Am race at Portland International Raceway in 1983

Ribbs' made his first attempt at the Indianapolis 500 in 1985, which ended in controversy when during testing he topped out at 170 miles per hour while other rookie drivers were running laps above 200 miles per hour. Ribbs proceeded to withdraw from the race altogether. The deal had been put together in part by boxing promoter Don King, who Ribbs hired to manage him, with sponsorship from Miller Brewing Company, but with a second hand Cosworth machine from Arie Luyendyk.

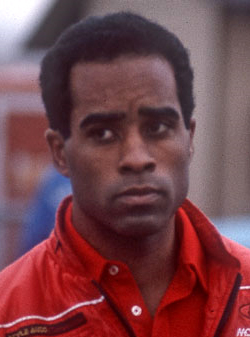
Ribbs in 1984

Ribbs attempted NASCAR again in 1986, running three races in the No. 30 Red Roof Inns car owned by DiGard Motorsports. His best finish came at his debut, a 22nd at North Wilkesboro Speedway. Also in 1986, Ribbs became the first black person to drive a Formula One car, when he tested for the Bernie Ecclestone-owned Brabham team at the Autódromo do Estoril, Portugal. Ultimately, Ribbs was not given the drive for the upcoming season. In 1987, Ribbs began driving Toyota Celicas for Dan Gurney in the IMSA GT Championship, winning four races.

In 1990, Ribbs joined the CART circuit in a car funded in-part by comedian Bill Cosby. Ribbs had one top-10 event that season. He was involved in an unfortunate incident in Vancouver when a group of track marshals ran onto the track to assist Ross Bentley who had stalled, however, one of the marshals ran in front of Ribbs' car and the marshal was killed in the impact.

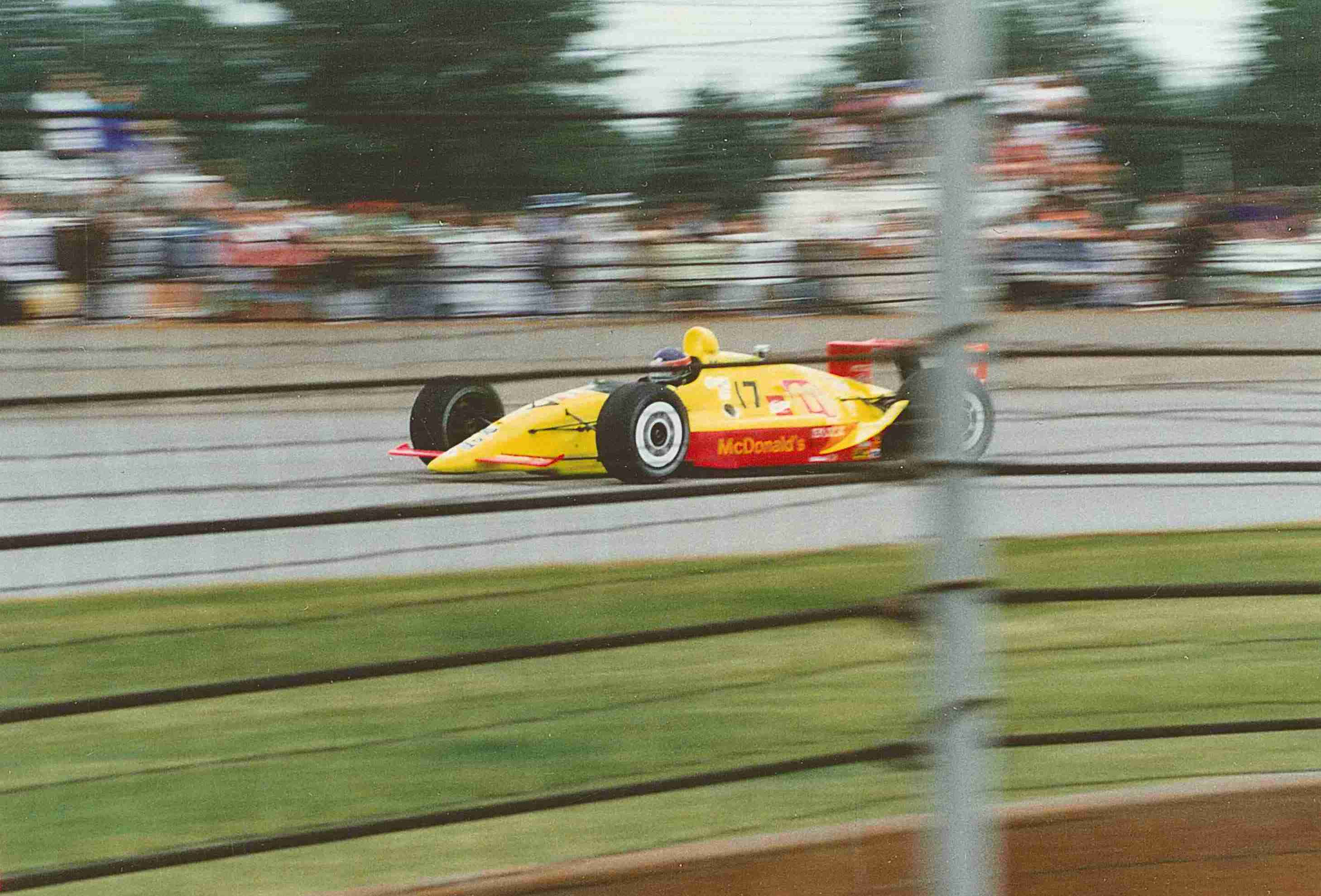
Ribbs at the 1991 Indianapolis 500

In 1991, Ribbs became the first African-American to qualify for the Indianapolis 500. He raced there a second time in 1993. In 1994, he continued in the CART series with the team, finishing in the top 10 at the Michigan International Speedway and New Hampshire International Speedway races.

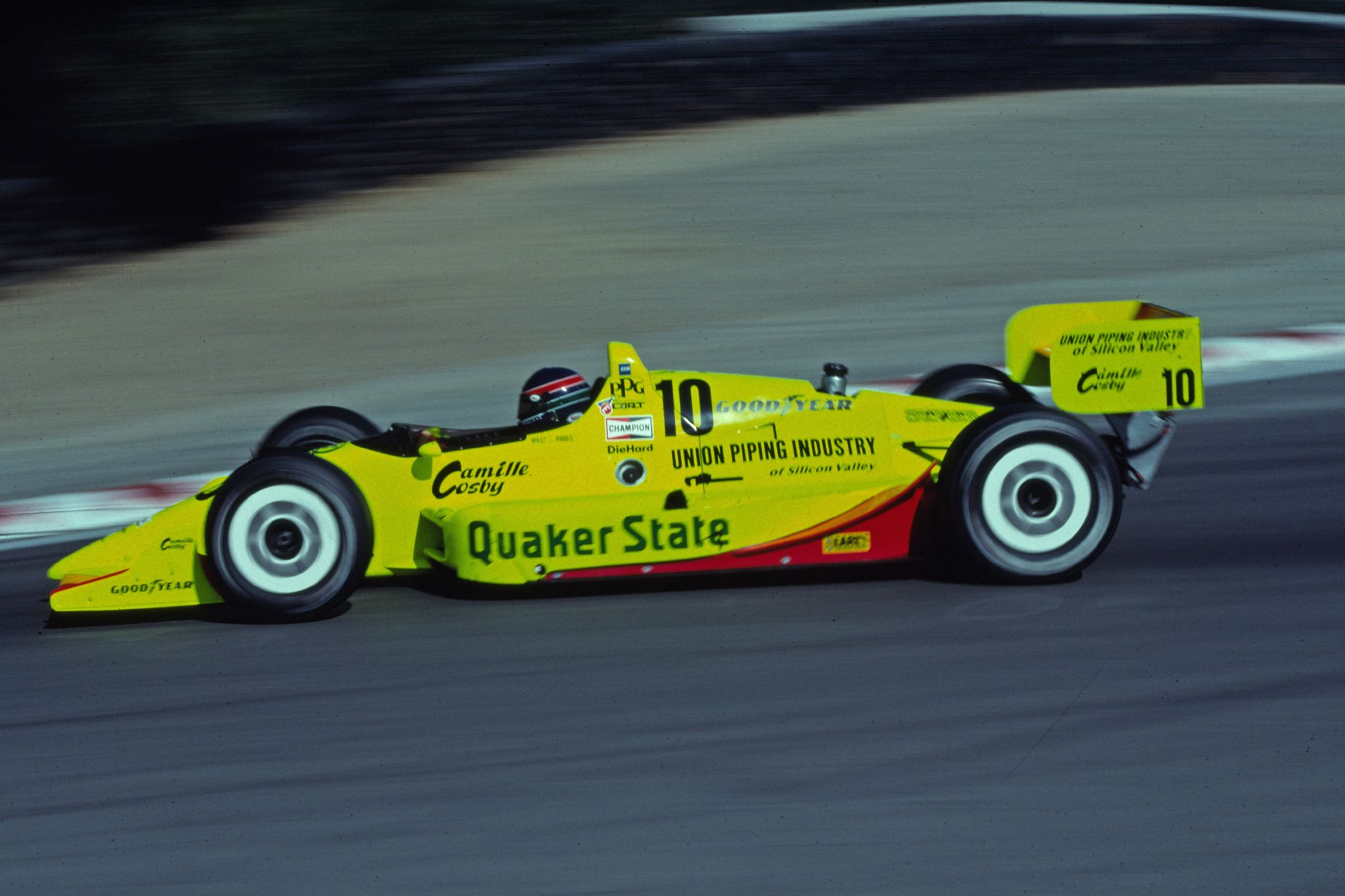
Ribbs driving at Laguna Seca in 1991

In 1999, Ribbs raced in an Indy Racing League IndyCar Series event at Las Vegas Motor Speedway for McCormack Motorsports as a try-out to join the team full-time in 2000. However he crashed on lap four and finished in 26th and last place. After three top-10s the Trans-Am Series in 2000, Ribbs signed to drive the No. 8 Dodge Ram for Bobby Hamilton Racing in the NASCAR Craftsman Truck Series. Driving 23 out of 24 races, Ribbs had a best finish of 13th, and finished 16th in points.

In May 2011, Ribbs announced he had formed Willy T. Ribbs Racing to campaign former biracial NASCAR driver Chase Austin in the Firestone Indy Lights' Freedom 100 at the Indianapolis Motor Speedway, which coincided with Ribbs' 20th anniversary of breaking the color barrier at Indy. Ribbs himself came out of retirement to drive for the team in the Baltimore GP.

Among Ribbs' career highlights are winning the pole for the Formula Atlantic race at the 1982 Long Beach Grand Prix, IMSA GTO Driver of the Year 1987-88, and Trans Am Series Driver of the Year 1983. Ribbs won 17 Trans Am and 10 IMSA GTO races. He was enshrined on Long Beach Walk of Fame.

In 2019, Ribbs won the Indy Legends Charity Pro–Am race with co-driver Ed Sevadjian.

=== After racing ===
After retiring from racing, Ribbs turned to professional shooting, specializing in sporting clays. His son Theodore Ribbs is a professional sport shooter. Ribbs married hotel management executive Stephanie Bauer in August 2018.

== Controversy ==
Ribbs, an outspoken Black man (and not an obsequious "Stepin Fetchit," as Ribbs termed the sort of Black man the racing community wanted) had received criticism for his forthrightness during his career, sometimes from other African Americans in auto racing. Black car owner Leonard T. Miller, felt Ribbs was not the best representative of the Black community due to his outspoken nature. Ribbs has also spoken negatively about his experience in NASCAR. In May 2006, a newspaper column by Jason Whitlock of Knight-Ridder quoted Ribbs detailing his criticism of NASCAR and his lauding of the Indianapolis 500. Ribbs created controversy by referring to NASCAR as "Al-Qaida", "Neckcar", and WWE.

In 1984, during a warm-up session at the SCCA Trans-Am Series season opener at Road Atlanta, Ribbs was fined $1,000 for throwing a punch at fellow driver Bob Lobenberg, after the two drivers made contact on the track. In 1987 following a race at Portland International Raceway, Ribbs was suspended by the International Motor Sports Association for one month after throwing a punch at driver Scott Pruett.

== In media ==
In the Disney Channel cartoon The Proud Family and its 2021 Disney+ reboot The Proud Family: Louder and Prouder, Penny Proud and her friends attend "Willy T. Ribbs Middle School," where the mascot is the "Racer."

Ribbs was featured in the 2020 documentary Uppity: The Willy T. Ribbs Story, which released on Netflix.

After driving in the 2021 SRX Series, Ribbs became a roving reporter for the 2022 season.

== Awards ==
- Ribbs was inducted into the Trans-Am Series Hall of Fame in 2025.

== Motorsports career results ==
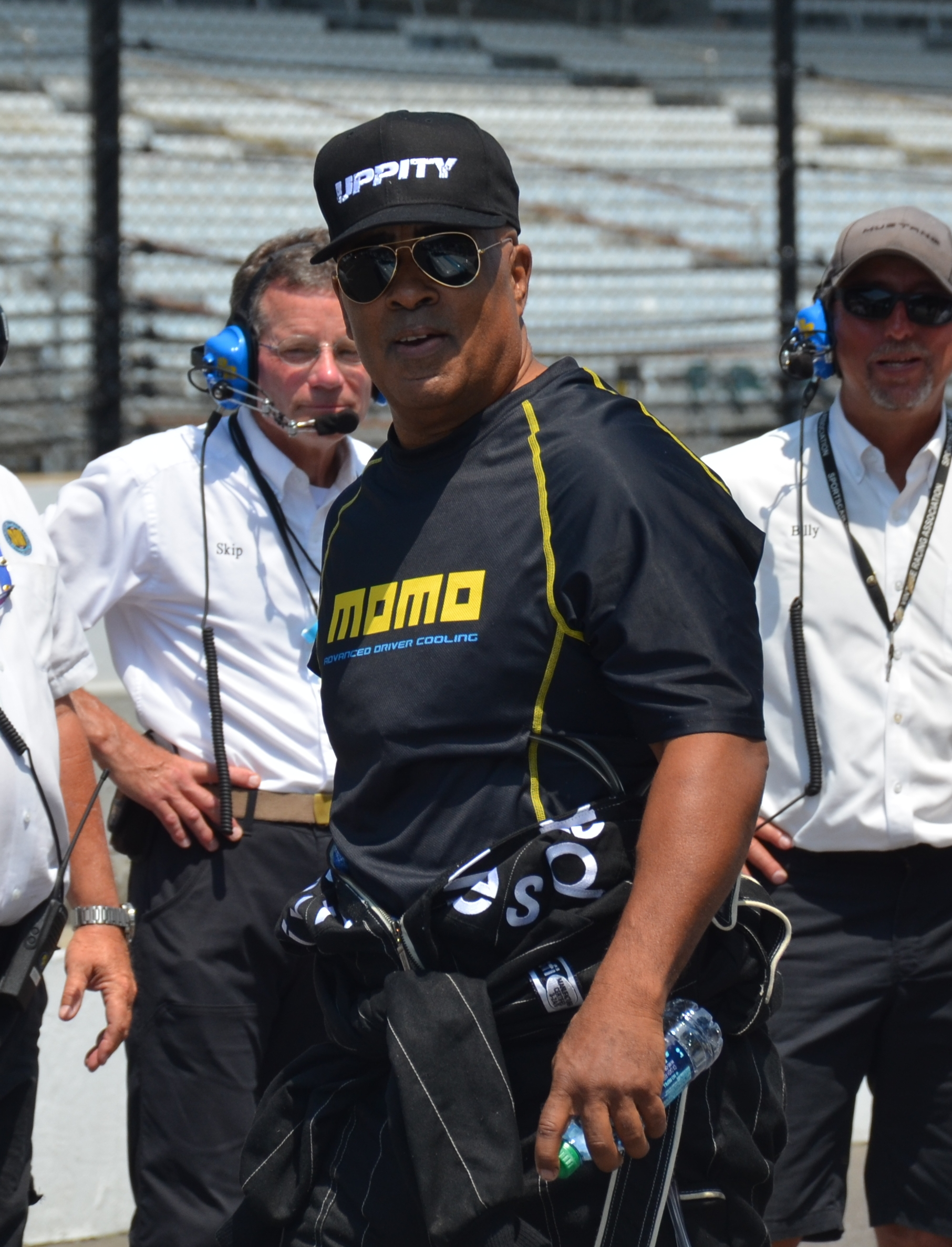
Ribbs at the Indianapolis Motor Speedway in 2018

=== Career summary ===
Season	Series	Team	Races	Wins	Poles	F/Laps	Podiums	Points	Position
1978	Formula Atlantic		1	0	0	0	0	1	36th
1981	North American Formula Atlantic	Ralt America	3	0	0	0	0	6	33rd
1982	North American Formula Atlantic	Archie Snider	3	0	1	0	0	19	19th
1983	Trans-Am Series	DeAtley Motorsports	12	5	4	7	6	148	**2nd**
1983	IMSA GT Championship - GTU	All American Racers	1	0	0	0	0	0	NC
1984	Trans-Am Series	DeAtley Motorsports	13	4	2	5	9	155	**3rd**
1984	IMSA GT Championship - GTO		1	1	1	0	1	20	24th
1985	Trans-Am Series	Roush Protofab	15	7	4	7	10	213	**2nd**
1985	IMSA GT Championship - GTO	Roush Protofab	2	1	2	1	1	20	27th
1985	Formula One	Motor Racing Developments	Test driver						
1986	IMSA GT Championship - GTO	Brooks Racing	9	1	1	2	4	92	5th
1986	Trans-Am Series	Brooks Racing	2	0	0	0	0	11	27th
1986	NASCAR Winston Cup Series		3	0	0	0	0	219	65th
1987	IMSA GT Championship - GTO	All American Racers	13	4	3	4	6	125	5th
1988	IMSA GT Championship - GTO	All American Racers	12	2	1	2	4	96	**3rd**
1988	Trans-Am Series	Lindley Racing	7	1	1	2	3	78.5	11th
1989	IMSA GT Championship - GTP	All American Racers	12	0	0	0	0	24	23rd
1989	Trans-Am Series	Lindley Racing	1	0	0	0	1	16	22nd
1990	CART PPG Indy Car World Series	Raynor Racing	8	0	0	0	0	3	26th
1990	IMSA GT Championship - GTP	All American Racers	1	0	0	0	0	0	NC
1991	CART PPG Indy Car World Series	Walker Racing	9	0	0	0	0	17	17th
1991	IMSA GT Championship - GTP	All American Racers	2	0	0	0	0	7	37th
1992	CART PPG Indy Car World Series	Walker Racing	1	0	0	0	0	0	NC
1992	Trans-Am Series	Whistler	1	0	0	0	0	6	58th
1993	CART PPG Indy Car World Series	Walker Motorsport	13	0	0	0	0	9	20th
1994	CART PPG Indy Car World Series	Walker Racing	15	0	0	0	0	12	22nd
1999	Indy Racing League	McCormack Motorsports	1	0	0	0	0	4	47th
2000	Trans-Am Series	Clover Enterprises	11	0	0	0	1	153	7th
2001	NASCAR Craftsman Truck Series	Bobby Hamilton Racing	23	0	0	0	0	2319	16th
2011	Indy Lights	Willy T. Ribbs Racing	1	0	0	0	0	17	29th
2021	SRX Series		6	0	0	0	0	67	10th

=== American open–wheel racing results ===
(key)

==== PPG Indycar Series ====
(key) (Races in bold indicate pole position)

Year	Team	1	2	3	4	5	6	7	8	9	10	11	12	13	14	15	16	17	Rank	Points	Ref
1984	Doug Shierson Racing	LBH	PHX	INDY; Wth^{1}	MIL	POR	MEA	CLE	MCH	ROA	POC	MDO	SAN	MCH	PHX	LAG	CPL		NC	-	
1985	AMI Racing	LBH	INDY; Wth^{2}	MIL	POR	MEA	CLE	MCH	ROA	POC	MDO	SAN	MCH	LAG	PHX	MIA			NC	-	
1990	Raynor Motorsports	PHX	LBH; 20	INDY	MIL	DET; 20	POR	CLE	MEA; 23	TOR; 27	MCH	DEN; 26	VAN; 10	MDO; 27	ROA	NAZ	LAG; 13		**26th**	**3**	
1991	Walker Racing	SRF	LBH	PHX	INDY; 32	MIL	DET; 11	POR	CLE; 22	MEA; 10	TOR	MCH	DEN; 6	VAN; 21	MDO	ROA; 10	NAZ; 17	LAG; 12	**17th**	**17**	
1992	Walker Racing	SRF	PHX	LBH	INDY	DET	POR	MIL	NHA	TOR	MCH	CLE	ROA	VAN	MDO	NAZ	LAG; 25		**57th**	**0**	
1993	Walker Racing	SRF	PHX	LBH	INDY; 21	MIL; 11	DET; 12	POR; 16	CLE; 27	TOR; 18	MCH; 10	NHA; 15	ROA; 12	VAN; 16	MDO; 11	NAZ; 19	LAG; 28		**20th**	**9**	
1994	Walker Racing	SRF; 18	PHX; 28	LBH; 18	INDY; DNQ	MIL; 25	DET; 16	POR; 25	CLE; 12	TOR; 21	MCH; 7	MDO; 28	NHA; 10	VAN; 25	ROA; 24	NAZ; 18	LAG; 11		**22nd**	**12**	

^{1} Did not appear
^{2} Withdrew from rookie orientation

==== Indy Racing League ====
(key) (Races in bold indicate pole position)

Year	Team	Chassis	No.	Engine	1	2	3	4	5	6	7	8	9	10	11	Rank	Points	Ref
1999	McCormack Motorsports	G-Force GF01C	30	Oldsmobile Aurora V8	WDW	PHX	CLT	INDY	TXS	PPIR	ATL	DOV	PPIR	LVS; 26	TXS	47th	4	

==== Indianapolis 500 ====
Year	Chassis	Engine	Start	Finish	Team
1984	DSR-1	Cosworth	Wth		Doug Shierson Racing
1985	March 85C	Cosworth	Wth		AMI Racing
1991	Lola T9000	Buick	29	32	Raynor Motorsports
1993	Lola T9200	FordXB	30	21	Walker Racing
1994	Lola T9400	FordXB	DNQ		Walker Racing

==== Indy Lights ====
Year	Team	1	2	3	4	5	6	7	8	9	10	11	12	13	14	Rank	Points	Ref
2011	Willy T. Ribbs Racing	STP	ALA	LBH	INDY	MIL	IOW	TOR	EDM1	EDM2	TRO	NHM	BAL; 13	KTY	LVS	**29th**	**17**	

=== NASCAR ===
(key) (Bold – Pole position awarded by qualifying time. Italics – Pole position earned by points standings or practice time. * – Most laps led.)

==== Winston Cup Series ====
NASCAR Winston Cup Series results
Year	Team	No.	Make	1	2	3	4	5	6	7	8	9	10	11	12	13	14	15	16	17	18	19	20	21	22	23	24	25	26	27	28	29	NWCC	Pts	Ref
1986	DiGard Motorsports	30	Chevy	DAY	RCH	CAR	ATL	BRI; DNQ	DAR	NWS; 22	MAR	TAL	DOV	CLT; DNQ			MCH; 39	DAY	POC	TAL	GLN; 37	MCH	BRI	DAR	RCH	DOV	MAR	NWS	CLT	CAR	ATL	RSD	65th	219	
1986	DiGard Motorsports	64	Chevy												RSD; 29	POC																	65th	219	

==== Craftsman Truck Series ====
NASCAR Craftsman Truck Series results
Year	Team	No.	Make	1	2	3	4	5	6	7	8	9	10	11	12	13	14	15	16	17	18	19	20	21	22	23	24	NCTC	Pts	Ref
2001	Bobby Hamilton Racing	8	Dodge	DAY; 23	HOM; 19	MMR; 28	MAR; DNQ	GTY; 20	DAR; 29	PPR; 13	DOV; 19	TEX; 25	MEM; 17	MLW; 18	KAN; 15	KEN; 30	NHA; 18	IRP; 20	NSH; 24	CIC; 28	NZH; 18	RCH; 20	SBO; 28	TEX; 19	LVS; 25	PHO; 19	CAL; 18	16th	2319	

=== Superstar Racing Experience ===
(key) * – Most laps led. ^{1} – Heat 1 winner. ^{2} – Heat 2 winner.

Superstar Racing Experience results
Year	No.	1	2	3	4	5	6	SRXC	Pts
2021	17	STA; 8	KNX; 10	ELD; 9	IRP; 11	SLG; 7	NSV; 12	10th	67

^{*} Season still in progress

== See also ==
- Wendell Scott, NASCAR driver and first African-American race winner.
- Lewis Hamilton, first British driver of black and white mixed background to compete in a Formula One Grand Prix, win a race, and become World Drivers' Champion.
