= Pickup truck racing =

Auto racing with modified pickup trucks

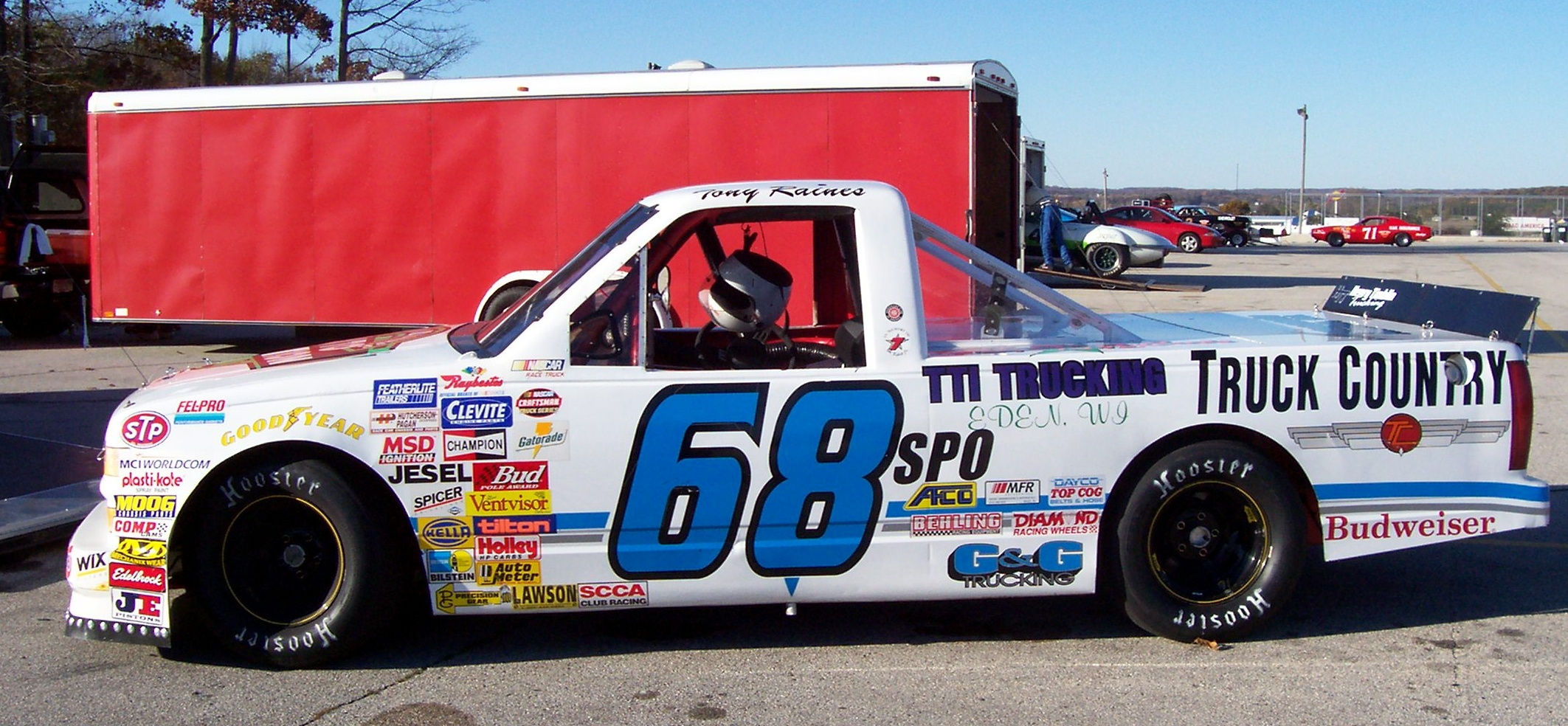
A 1999 NASCAR Truck Series pickup truck

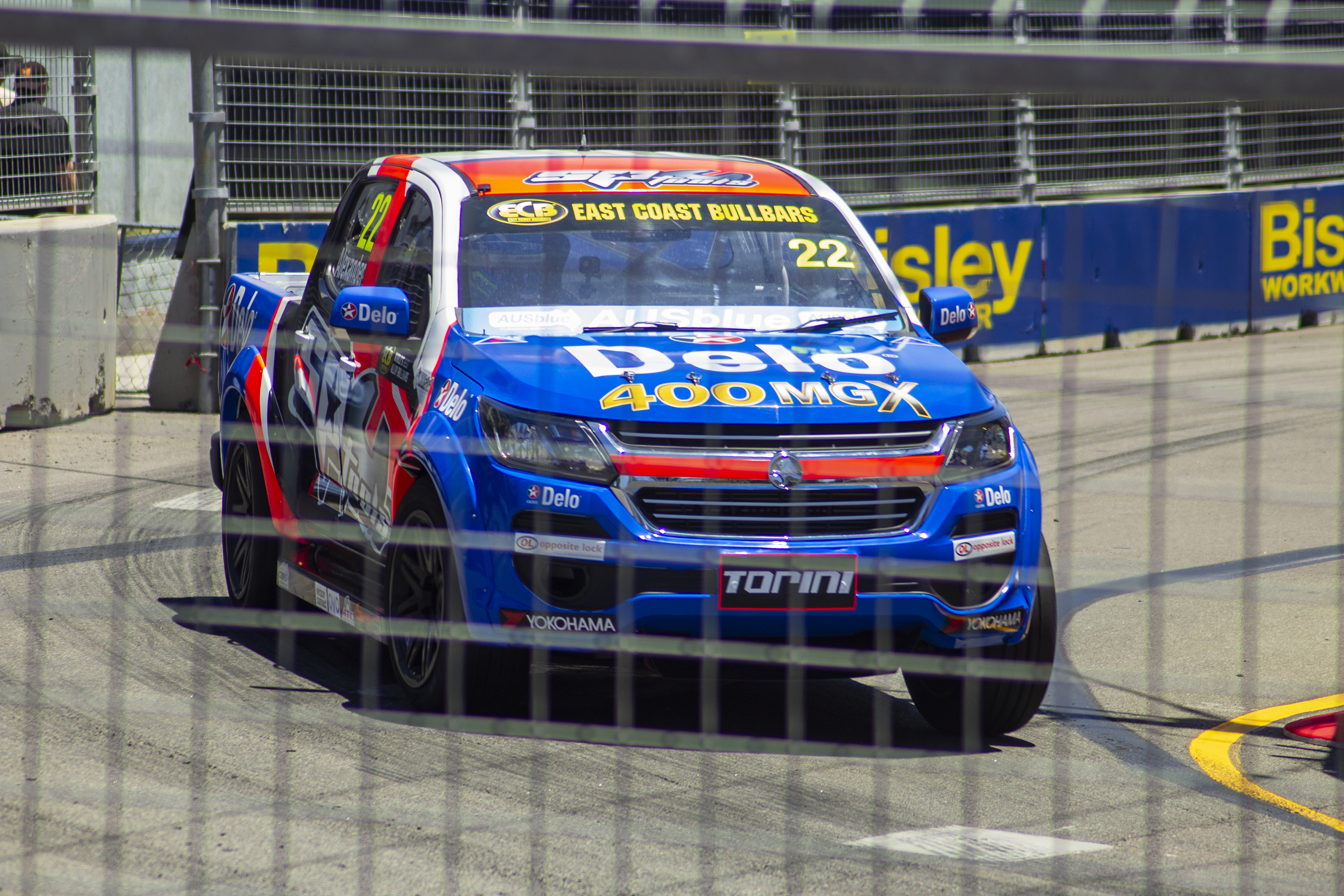
Australian SuperUtes Series

Pickup truck racing is a form of auto racing which involves modified versions of pickup trucks on racing circuits, mostly oval tracks. Race pickup trucks are mechanically similar to coupé-shaped stock cars, with the main difference being the more boxy shape of the cab, which does not have as good aerodynamics as stock cars.

NASCAR Truck Series vehicles have been rapidly evolving since the inception of the series in 1995, in terms of speed, aerodynamics, and engine equipment. The NASCAR series was also the first to use this type of vehicle, unveiled in 1994.

== History ==
The concept of pickup truck racing started in 1983 when former NASCAR driver Buck Baker established the National Pickup Truck Racing Association to help Buck Baker Driving School graduates start their careers. The series, which did not plan to have a points system, had a ten-race schedule planned with intentions to sell the series to NASCAR. The trucks were built with a 1981 NASCAR Winston Cup Series car base; the four-barrel Cup Series carburetors were reduced to two to decrease speeds. The series began to increase in popularity, and the schedule was increased to eleven races. After the season ended, Baker's attempted sale of the series to NASCAR was denied, and was sold to Dick Moroso, with the series being rebranded the Moroso Performance All-Pro Pickup Truck Series.

In 1991, SCORE International racers Dick Landfield, Jimmy Smith, Jim Venable and Frank "Scoop" Vessels unveiled plans to create a pickup truck series for NASCAR. Three years later, the trucks were unveiled at the 1994 Daytona 500, and officially created as the SuperTruck Series. After hosting seven exhibition races, the series held its first season in 1995. The series, now known as the NASCAR Craftsman Truck Series, is one of three national series sanctioned by NASCAR (besides the Cup Series and Xfinity Series).

== Truck racing series ==
North America

- United States
  - NASCAR Craftsman Truck Series (1995–present)
  - National Pickup Truck Racing Association (1983)
  - SCCA RaceTruck Challenge (1987–1991)
  - Moroso Performance All-Pro Pickup Truck Series (1984)
  - ARCA Lincoln Welders Truck Series (1996–2016)
  - FASCAR Pro Truck and Sportsman Series (2005–2008)
  - Ultra Wheel Spec Truck Series (1996–2001)
  - ProTruck West Series (1998–2000)
- Mexico
  - MasterCard Truck Series (2002–2003)
  - Pick Up Racing Mexico (2006–2012)
  - Mikel's Trucks Series (2017–present)

South America

- Argentina
  - TC Pick Up (2018–present)
- Brazil
  - Pick-Up Racing (2001–2009)
  - Copa Chevrolet Montana (2010–2012)

Europe

- British
  - Pickup Truck Racing

Oceania

- Australia
  - V8 Utes (2001–2017)
  - SuperUtes Series (2018–present)
- New Zealand
  - SsangYong Racing Series

Asia

- Thailand
  - Thailand Super Series (2013–present)
