= 1985 Trans-Am Series =

Sports car premier series running

Seasons
- ← 1984 1986 →

The 1985 Bendix Brake Trans-Am Racing Series was the twentieth running of the Sports Car Club of America's premier series. Buick, despite having notable success in 1985, would never see another Trans Am victory.

== Results ==
Round	Date	Circuit	Winning driver	Winning vehicle
1	21 April	Firebird	(United States) Willy T. Ribbs	Mercury Capri
2	2 June	Sears Point	(United States) Willy T. Ribbs	Mercury Capri
3	15 June	Portland	(United States) Wally Dallenbach Jr.	Mercury Capri
4	22 June	Detroit	(United States) Elliott Forbes-Robinson	Buick Somerset
5	7 July	Summit Point	(United States) Willy T. Ribbs	Mercury Capri
6	14 July	Mid-Ohio	(United States) Wally Dallenbach Jr.	Mercury Capri
7	21 July	Brainerd	(United States) Willy T. Ribbs	Mercury Capri
8	4 August	Road America	(United States) Willy T. Ribbs	Mercury Capri
9	10 August	Lime Rock	(United States) Paul Miller	Porsche Carrera
10	25 August	Watkins Glen	(United States) Wally Dallenbach Jr.	Mercury Capri
11	1 September	Trois-Rivières	(United States) Willy T. Ribbs	Mercury Capri
12	8 September	Mosport	(United States) Wally Dallenbach Jr.	Mercury Capri
13	15 September	St. Louis	(United States) Wally Dallenbach Jr.	Mercury Capri
NP	28 September	Sears Point (Non-points special)	(United States) Willy T. Ribbs	Mercury Capri
14	29 September	Sears Point	(United States) Elliott Forbes-Robinson	Buick Somerset
15	3 November	St. Petersburg	(United States) Willy T. Ribbs	Mercury Capri

== Championship standings (Top 10) ==
Pos	Driver	Points
1	(United States) Wally Dallenbach Jr.	228
2	(United States) Willy T. Ribbs	212
3	(United States) Tom Gloy	170
4	(United States) Elliott Forbes-Robinson	123
5	(United States) Chris Kneifel	101
6	(United States) Jim Miller	93
7	(United States) Paul Miller	79
8	(Canada) Eppie Wietzes	70
9	(United States) Paul Newman	69
10	(United States) Les Lindley	56
