= SCCA RaceTruck Challenge =

Pickup truck racing series

- Country: United States of America
- Inaugural season: 1987
- Folded: 1991
- Constructors: Nissan; Jeep; Ford; Dodge; Mitsubishi; Isuzu; Toyota; Chevrolet; Mazda
- Tyre suppliers: Toyo Tires; Goodyear; General Tire; Firestone
- Last Drivers' champion: (United States) Steve Saleen
- Last Makes' champion: Nissan D21
- Last Teams' champion: (United States) Saleen

The SCCA RaceTruck Challenge is a former pickup truck racing series ran by SCCA Pro Racing between 1987 and 1991. The series utilizes pickup trucks on road course circuits.

== History ==
The SCCA RaceTruck Challenge started in 1987 with a nine race schedule across North-America. The first ever SCCA RaceTruck Challenge race was contested at Sears Point International Raceway on 25 April 1987. Max Jones won the inaugural race driving a Nissan. Saleen entered the series with their Ford Ranger badged Saleen Sport Truck. The Ford Ranger captured two wins. Pete Halsmer won at Memphis International Raceway while Steve Saleen won at Mid-Ohio Sports Car Course. Eventually nine Saleen Sport Trucks were built for competition. Jones won the championship in front of Bobby Archer and Tommy Archer.

For 1988 the series saw an eleven race schedule supporting Trans-Am Series and CART. Tommy Archer won four out of the eleven races and was declared champion at the end of the season. The 1989 season saw smaller fields compared to the 1988 season. Nissan was the strongest marque winning the constructor's title. Ray Kong was the series champion. For 1990 Coors departed as the series sponsor. Shell Zone took over as the series sponsor. Peter Cunningham won the 1990 season. Steve Saleen was the final series champion in 1991. Saleen won the championship in a Saleen built Ford Ranger.

== Champions ==
| Year | Driver | Truck |
|---|---|---|
| 1987 | (California) Max Jones | Nissan D21 |
| 1988 | (Minnesota) Tommy Archer | Jeep Comanche |
| 1989 | (California) Ray Kong | Nissan D21 |
| 1990 | (Wisconsin) Peter Cunningham | Mazda B2000 |
| 1991 | (California) Steve Saleen | Ford Ranger |
