= 1986 Trans-Am Series =

American sports car racing competition

Seasons
- ← 1985 1987 →

The 1986 Trans-Am Series was the 21st running of the Sports Car Club of America's premier series. Mercury saw its final Trans Am victories in 1986, not counting the Merkur brand which would continue to dominate the series for a few years thereafter.

== Results ==
Round	Date	Circuit	Winning driver	Winning vehicle
1	18 May	Riverside	(United States) Scott Pruett	Mercury Capri
2	1 June	Sears Point	(United States) Wally Dallenbach Jr.	Chevrolet Camaro
3	14 June	Portland	(United States) Wally Dallenbach Jr.	Chevrolet Camaro
4	21 June	Detroit	(United States) Wally Dallenbach Jr.	Chevrolet Camaro
5	13 July	Mid Ohio	(United States) Greg Pickett	Chevrolet Camaro
6	20 July	Brainerd	(United States) Greg Pickett	Chevrolet Camaro
7	27 July	Road America	(United States) Pete Halsmer	Merkur XR4Ti
8	16 August	Lime Rock	(United States) Paul Newman	Nissan 300ZX
9	14 September	Mosport	(United States) Scott Pruett	Mercury Capri
NP	27 September	Sears Point (Non-points special)	(United States) Wally Dallenbach Jr.	Chevrolet Camaro
10	28 September	Sears Point	(United States) Wally Dallenbach Jr.	Chevrolet Camaro
11	28 September	Road Atlanta	(United States) Chris Kneifel	Merkur XR4Ti
12	8 November	Tamiami Park	(West Germany) Klaus Ludwig	Merkur XR4Ti
13	15 November	St. Petersburg	(United States) Pete Halsmer	Merkur XR4Ti

== Championship standings (Top 20) ==
Pos	Driver	Points
1	(United States) Wally Dallenbach Jr.	165
2	(United States) Pete Halsmer	116
3	(United States) Chris Kneifel	112
4	(United States) Elliott Forbes-Robinson	109
5	(United States) Mike Miller	103
6	(United States) Greg Pickett	100
7	(United States) Les Lindley	97
8	(United States) Scott Pruett	94
9	(United States) Jim Miller	92
10	(United States) Jim Derhaag	71
11	(United States) John Schneider	65
12	(Canada) Eppie Wietzes	49
13	(United States) Tommy Riggins	48
14	(West Germany) Klaus Ludwig	38
15	(United States) Bill Doyle	35
16	(United States) Rick Dittman	33
17	(United States) Jerry Miller	30
18	(United States) Paul Newman	28
19	(United States) Pete Brallier	26
20	(United States) Jerry Clinton	25
