= Albert Whitted Airport =

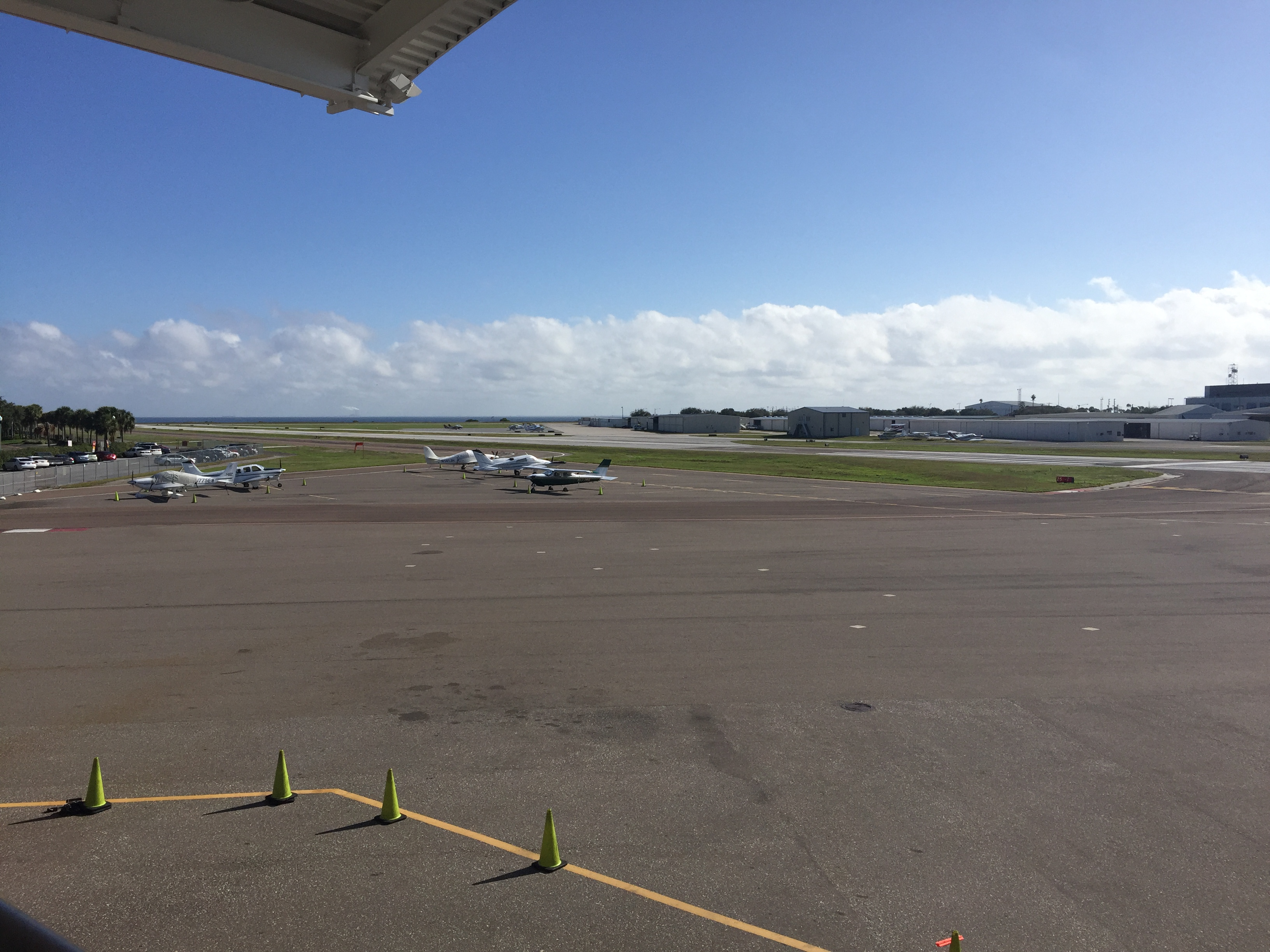
- IATA: SPG; ICAO: KSPG; FAA LID: SPG

Summary
- Airport type: Public
- Owner: City of St. Petersburg
- Serves: St. Petersburg, Florida
- Elevation AMSL: 7 ft (2.1 m)
- Coordinates: 27°45′54″N 082°37′37″W

Map
- Location in Florida SPG (the United States)

Runways
Direction	Length		Surface
Direction	ft	m	Surface
7/25	3,677	1,121	Asphalt
18/36	2,864	873	Asphalt

Statistics (2013)
- Aircraft operations: 96,827
- Based aircraft: 184
- Source: Federal Aviation Administration

Albert Whitted Airport (IATA: SPG, ICAO: KSPG, FAA LID: SPG) is a public airport in St. Petersburg, Pinellas County, Florida, United States. It is on the west edge of Tampa Bay, just southeast of downtown St. Petersburg and east of the University of South Florida St. Petersburg.

== History ==
St. Petersburg is recognized as the birthplace of scheduled commercial airline flight. On January 1, 1914, a Benoist XIV flying boat from the company St. Petersburg-Tampa Airboat Line piloted by Tony Jannus, took off from the central yacht basin of the downtown waterfront, on the first scheduled commercial aircraft flight in history. His passenger was A. C. Pheil, a former mayor of St. Petersburg. Albert Whitted Airport began construction in October 1928 and opened in the summer of 1929.

The airport is named for Lieutenant James Albert Whitted, USNR, a St. Petersburg native. He was one of the U.S. Navy's first 250 Naval Aviators, commissioned at age 24 just as the United States entered World War I in 1917. He served as chief instructor of advanced flying at NAS Pensacola, Florida and was later assigned to Naval Station Guantanamo Bay, Cuba. Leaving active duty, he returned home in 1919 and introduced the people of St. Petersburg to flying. Whitted would take people up in the "Bluebird", a plane he designed and built. He never charged for the flights. His aerial maneuvers always left spectators in awe. He also designed and built the Falcon. The Falcon and Bluebird were used in a commercial flying business he had with his brother, Clarence. On August 19, 1923, Whitted and four passengers were killed during a flight near Pensacola aboard the Falcon when the propeller broke off. The city's airport, known until then as Cook-Springstead tracks, was renamed Albert Whitted Airport on 12 October 1928.

National Airlines began service there in 1934; it moved to St. Petersburg-Clearwater International Airport by the end of World War II. Decades later, National merged with Pan American World Airways (PanAm) to create one of the world's largest air carriers. In 1929, the Goodyear Tire and Rubber Company, at the request of St. Petersburg, agreed to base one of its famous airships (i.e., blimps) at Albert Whitted Airport. Albert Whitted Airport was one of the first airports to base their blimps.

In 1934-1935 the Public Works Administration (PWA) built what would become Coast Guard Air Station (CGAS) St. Petersburg in the southeast corner of Albert Whitted Airport.

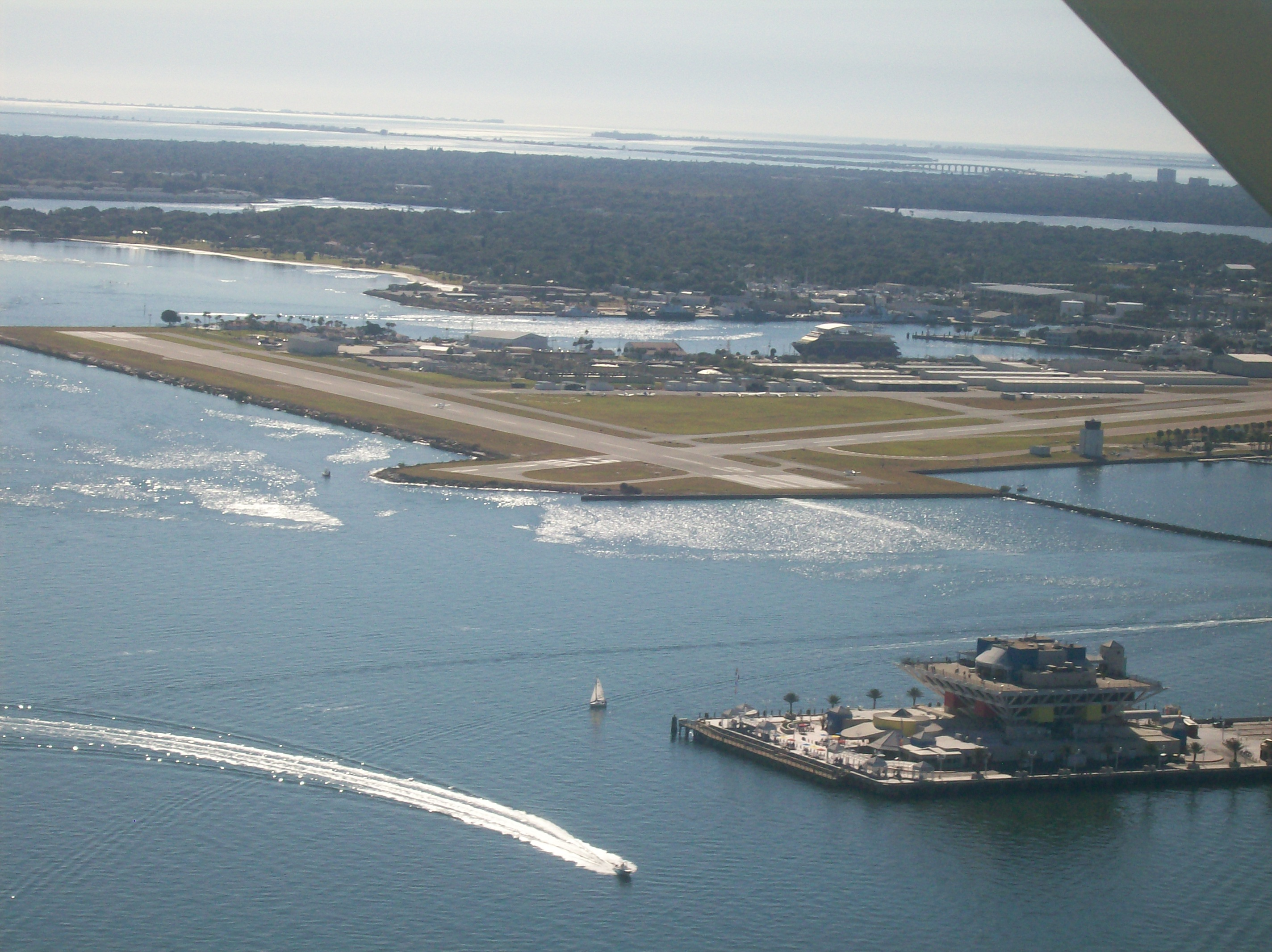
Albert Whitted Airport in 2006

During the first years of World War II, aircraft at CGAS St. Petersburg were part of a valiant but inadequate deterrent to the German submarine campaign in the Atlantic and the Gulf of Mexico. As the submarine threat in the Gulf slowly abated, the air station concentrated on search and rescue activities. After the war, commercial marine and aircraft traffic continued to increase and pleasure boating operation increased exponentially. Consolidated PBY-5A Catalina and Martin PBM Mariner aircraft came aboard during the last years of the war and stayed to be the backbone of the postwar search and rescue missions. By the mid-1950s, helicopters also became part of the CGAS St. Petersburg inventory. CGAS St. Petersburg also flew the large P5M Marlin, the last seaplane the U.S. Coast Guard procured in tandem with the U.S. Navy. The P5Ms were replaced beginning in 1951 by the amphibious HU-16 Albatross. By 1976, the HU-16s had been replaced with four HH-3F helicopters. The Coast Guard's desire to add four large, land-based HC-130 Hercules aircraft at St. Petersburg in 1976 made continued Coast Guard operations at Albert Whitted Airport an impossibility because of its short runways, prompting a move to the larger St. Petersburg-Clearwater International Airport and construction and establishment of a new air station, Coast Guard Air Station Clearwater, replacing CGAS St. Petersburg. With the establishment of CGAS Clearwater, CGAS St. Petersburg was subsequently converted to a non-flying Coast Guard installation as home to several cutters and the current Coast Guard Sector St. Petersburg headquarters.

In addition to Coast Guard flight operations, during World War II, Albert Whitted Airport was converted to military use as a primary flight training base for student Naval Aviators for the U.S. Navy and U.S. Marine Corps. Hundreds of Naval Aviation cadets under the U.S. Navy's V-5 pre-commissioning program received initial flight training in Stearman N2S and Waco biplanes. At the end of the war, Navy training ceased, civilian commercial and general aviation activity returned, and the Coast Guard remained the sole military aviation activity at the airport until its relocation in 1976.

== Facilities ==
Albert Whitted Airport covers 110 acres (45 ha) at an elevation of 7 feet (2 m). It has two asphalt runways: 7/25 is 3,677 by 75 feet (1,121 x 23 m) and 18/36 is 2,864 by 75 feet (873 x 23 m).

In 2015, the airport reported 89,000 general aircraft operations (not counting night activities), average 244 per day: 92% general aviation, 4% air taxi, and 4% military. 185 aircraft were then based at the airport: 78% single-engine, 16% multi-engine, <1% jet and 6% helicopter.

== Current operations ==
In its budget for the fiscal year 2012, the City of St. Petersburg lists the airport along with the municipal marina, golf courses and a few other enterprises as city operations that are self-supporting. The FY 2012 airport budget is $959,181. Fees are charged to users to pay the costs of operations.

Based on the 2005 Airport Master Plan commissioned by the City of St. Petersburg, estimates of total economic impact to the city place direct purchase of goods and services at $33,152,000, payroll at $12,025,880, and employment at 362 people.

The Grand Prix of St. Petersburg of the IndyCar Series is held at the airport annually in the spring. They use runway 7/25 as part of the track for which the airport is compensated for this non-aviation use. During this time the airport is still open but only has runway 18/36 open.

It is also home to businesses such as St. Pete Air Flight School, St. Pete Air Avionics, St. Pete Air Maintenance, Tampa Bay Aviation, Sheltair Aviation Services, The Hangar Restaurant and Flight Lounge, Tampa Bay Air Charter, It's Time to Shine, and Hertz. The Civil Air Patrol has a headquarters on site.

The Florida DOT named Albert Whitted Airport the 2009 Florida General Aviation Airport of the Year.

== Accidents and incidents ==
On June 15, 1967, a T-28 Navy trainer skidded off the runway while attempting to avoid colliding with a smaller plane. The pilot and passenger escaped injuries.

On March 25, 2011, a Mooney M20J, registered to Courtney Jones Aviation, crashed after veering left on the runway and ended up on the rock jetty off the runway. The pilot of the aircraft was not injured.

A few days later on March 27, 2011, a T-28 Warbird that was performing for the opening of the Honda Grand Prix crashed into the water after the pilot reported mechanical difficulties and attempted to make an emergency landing. Both the pilot and the passenger sustained minor injuries.

On March 23, 2014, a Cessna L19 owned by the Advertising Air Force ditched into the water south east of the airport after the pilot reported engine failure. The pilot of the aircraft survived the accident without injury.

On August 31, 2014, the pilot of a Piper PA-23, owned by Aerial Banners Incorporated, died after crashing 75 yards south of the airport shortly after takeoff.

On September 15, 2014, a Piper PA-28 from Tallahassee Regional Airport crashed in the Vinoy Park en route to Albert Whitted Airport. All four on board survived with two sustaining minor injuries and two sustaining critical injuries. Later reports from the NTSB confirmed the aircraft crashed as a result of "total loss of engine power due to fuel exhaustion" while approaching Albert Whitted Airport.

On October 10, 2024, Hurricane Milton brought damage to Albert Whitted Airport in St. Petersburg, with destroyed hangars, planes and debris scattered across the facility. City Council members unanimously approved a $1.2 million contract Jan. 9 to commence a hangar demolition and removal project.

== Developments ==
=== 2003 referendum ===
A local group, Citizens for a New Waterfront Park, collected signatures and placed a question on the 2003 city ballot that would have closed Albert Whitted and turned it into a city park. The City of St. Petersburg offered two ballot questions in support of the airport for the referendum: question #1 dealt with keeping Albert Whitted as an airport forever, and question #2 dealt with the acceptance of governmental grants for the airport. Residents voted overwhelmingly to retain the historic airport.

Since 2003, capital improvements have totaled over $11 million.

=== Additions and renovations ===
In October 2007, the city completed construction on a $4 million-10,600 sq/ft terminal building. The terminal also has a 12,200 sq/yd aircraft parking ramp and a 64-space parking lot. The terminal houses Sheltair, the airport's Fixed-Base Operator (FBO) and other various aviation and retail tenants. The Hangar Restaurant and Flight Lounge opened on the 2nd floor of the terminal in April 2010.

In 2008 the city opened Albert Whitted Park, which is located on the north side of the airport. The park has observation areas overlooking the airport and an aviation-themed playground. The park is open to the general public, but can be reserved for special functions. A new $3 million control tower is operational. The new Taxiway D on the northside and parallel to Runway 7-25 funded by the FAA is operational. This taxiway connects the terminal building with Runways 18 and 25.

In 2008, the City of St. Petersburg was given a $990,000 grant by the Obama Administration to build a new air traffic control tower because the City had it as a "shovel ready" project. The Obama Administration was looking for projects to bolster the economy during the 2008 economic banking crisis. Those funds were added to a Congressional earmark created in 2005 by Congressman C. W. Bill Young to build a new tower. A new state-of-the-art air traffic control tower was built and made operational in August 2012.

The airport received FAA grants to rehabilitate both runways in 2016 and 2022. The runway project in 2022 changed the width of Runway 18-36 to 75 ft (23 m) to comply with current FAA standards. The project also reduce the effective length of the runway to accommodate revised runway overrun requirements.

== See also ==
- List of airports in Florida
- List of airports in the Tampa Bay Area
