= 1987 Trans-Am Series =

American sports car racing competition

Seasons
- ← 1986 1988 →

The 1987 Trans-Am Series was the 22nd running of the Sports Car Club of America's premier series. Merkur nearly swept the season, with Porsche winning at Brainerd.

== Results ==
Round	Date	Circuit	Winning driver	Winning vehicle
1	4 April	Long Beach	(United States) Scott Pruett	Merkur XR4Ti
2	31 May	Sears Point	(United States) Scott Pruett	Merkur XR4Ti
3	7 June	Portland	(United States) Pete Halsmer	Merkur XR4Ti
4	20 June	Detroit	(United States) Scott Pruett	Merkur XR4Ti
5	12 July	Mid Ohio	(United States) Scott Pruett	Merkur XR4Ti
6	19 July	Brainerd	(United States) Elliott Forbes-Robinson	Porsche 944
7	1 August	Lime Rock Park	(United States) Pete Halsmer	Merkur XR4Ti
8	29 August	Road America	(United States) Pete Halsmer	Merkur XR4Ti
9	13 September	Memphis	(United States) Scott Pruett	Merkur XR4Ti
10	20 September	Mosport	(United States) Scott Pruett	Merkur XR4Ti
11	11 October	Road Atlanta	(United States) Pete Halsmer	Merkur XR4Ti
NP	7 November	St. Petersburg (Non-points special)	(United States) Pete Halsmer	Merkur XR4Ti
12	8 November	St. Petersburg	(United States) Scott Pruett	Merkur XR4Ti

== Championship standings (Top 10) ==
Pos	Driver	Points
1	(United States) Scott Pruett	191
2	(United States) Les Lindley	129
3	(United States) Pete Halsmer	120
4	(United States) Jim Derhaag	111
5	(United States) Deborah Gregg	109
6	(United States) Elliott Forbes-Robinson	73
7	(United States) Bruce Nesbitt	55
8	(United States) Paul Gentilozzi	53
9	(United States) Bill Doyle	52
10	(United States) Jerry Thompson	50
