= 1997 North American Touring Car Championship =

1997 NATCC season

Seasons
- ← 1996 none →

The 1997 North American Touring Car Championship was the second and final season of the North American Touring Car Championship. The series was organized by CART, and ran to Super Touring regulations. 18 rounds at 9 race meetings were organized, all but one (in Savannah, Georgia) supporting the CART World Series.

== Teams and drivers ==
Team	Car	No.	Drivers	Rounds
TC Kline Racing	BMW 320i	1	(United States) Randy Pobst	All
TC Kline Racing	BMW 320i	12	(United States) Brian Battaglia	1–3
TC Kline Racing	BMW 320i	12	(United States) Tom Finnelly Jr.	4–5
TC Kline Racing	BMW 320i	12	(Canada) Doug Beatty	6
TC Kline Racing	BMW 320i	12	(United Kingdom) Paul Charsley	9
Rod Millen Motorsports	Toyota Camry	2	(New Zealand) Rod Millen	4
Tasman Motorsports	Honda Accord	4	(Australia) Neil Crompton	1–3, 5–9
Schader Motorsports	Mazda Xedos 6	5	(United States) Bob Schader	1–4, 6–9
Schader Motorsports	Mazda Xedos 6	5	(United States) Walter Puckett	5
Schader Motorsports	Mazda Xedos 6	6	(South Africa) Desiré Wilson	1–2, 6
Schader Motorsports	Mazda Xedos 6	6	(United States) Walter Puckett	3
Schader Motorsports	Mazda Xedos 6	6	(United States) Bob Schader	5
Schader Motorsports	Mazda Xedos 6	6	(United Kingdom) Paul Charsley	8
Schader Motorsports	Mazda Xedos 6	6	(United States) Ron Emmick	9
PacWest Touring Car Group	Dodge Stratus	7	(United States) Dominic Dobson	All
PacWest Touring Car Group	Dodge Stratus	8	(United States) David Donohue	All
Hartong Motorsports	BMW 318is	18	(United States) Darren Law	All
Fastech Group	Ford Mondeo	27	(United States) David Welch	All
Honda American Racing Team	Honda Accord	42	(United States) Peter Cunningham	All
Honda American Racing Team	Honda Accord	62	(United States) Forrest Granlund	1–3, 5, 7–9
Metalcraft	Pontiac Sunfire	80	(United States) Dave Jolly	9
Metalcraft	Pontiac Sunfire	81	(United States) Ron Emmick	8
Jonak Brothers Racing	BMW 320i	99	(Canada) Mark Jonak	1–2
Hertfelder Motorsports	Honda Accord	64	(Mexico) Roberto Quintanilla	5–8

== Calendar ==
The initial calendar was released with sixteen races, all supporting CART events. A doubleheader at the Savannah, Georgia Indy Lights' Dixie Crystals Grand Prix was added later.

Round		Date	Circuit	Location	Pole position	Winning driver	Winning team
1	1	April 17	(United States) Long Beach Street Circuit	Long Beach, California	(United States) Peter Cunningham	(Australia) Neil Crompton	Tasman Motorsports
1	2	April 17	(United States) Long Beach Street Circuit	Long Beach, California	(United States) Peter Cunningham	(Australia) Neil Crompton	Tasman Motorsports
2	3	May 17	(United States) Hutchinson Island	Savannah, Georgia	(United States) Peter Cunningham	(United States) Peter Cunningham	Honda American Racing Team
2	4	May 18	(United States) Hutchinson Island	Savannah, Georgia	(United States) Peter Cunningham	(United States) Peter Cunningham	Honda American Racing Team
3	5	June 8	(United States) Raceway at Belle Isle Park	Detroit, Michigan	(United States) David Donohue	(United States) David Donohue	PacWest Touring Car Group
3	6	June 8	(United States) Raceway at Belle Isle Park	Detroit, Michigan	(United States) David Donohue	(United States) Dominic Dobson	PacWest Touring Car Group
4	7	June 21	(United States) Portland International Raceway	Portland, Oregon	(United States) David Donohue	(United States) Peter Cunningham	Honda American Racing Team
4	8	June 21	(United States) Portland International Raceway	Portland, Oregon	(United States) David Donohue	(United States) Randy Pobst	TC Kline Racing
5	9	July 13	(United States) Cleveland Burke Lakefront Airport	Cleveland, Ohio	(United States) Dominic Dobson	(United States) David Donohue	PacWest Touring Car Group
5	10	July 13	(United States) Cleveland Burke Lakefront Airport	Cleveland, Ohio	(United States) Dominic Dobson	(United States) Peter Cunningham	Honda American Racing Team
6	11	July 19	(Canada) Toronto Street Circuit	Toronto, Ontario	(United States) Dominic Dobson	(United States) Dominic Dobson	PacWest Touring Car Group
6	12	July 19	(Canada) Toronto Street Circuit	Toronto, Ontario	(Australia) Neil Crompton	(Australia) Neil Crompton	Tasman Motorsports
7	13	August 9	(United States) Mid-Ohio Sports Car Course	Lexington, Ohio	(United States) David Donohue	(United States) David Donohue	PacWest Touring Car Group
7	14	August 9	(United States) Mid-Ohio Sports Car Course	Lexington, Ohio	(United States) David Donohue	(United States) David Donohue	PacWest Touring Car Group
8	15	August 31	(Canada) Concord Pacific Place	Vancouver, British Columbia	(United States) David Donohue	(Australia) Neil Crompton	Tasman Motorsports
8	16	August 31	(Canada) Concord Pacific Place	Vancouver, British Columbia	(United States) David Donohue	(Australia) Neil Crompton	Tasman Motorsports
9	17	September 7	(United States) Laguna Seca Raceway	Monterey, California	(United States) David Donohue	(Australia) Neil Crompton	Tasman Motorsports
9	18	September 7	(United States) Laguna Seca Raceway	Monterey, California	(United States) David Donohue	(Australia) Neil Crompton	Tasman Motorsports

== Championship standings ==
=== Drivers Championship ===
Pos	Driver	LBH (United States)		SAV (United States)		DET (United States)		POR (United States)		CLE (United States)		TOR (Canada)		MOH (United States)		VAN (Canada)		LAG (United States)		Pts
1	(United States) David Donohue	4	4	2	3	1	5	1	7	1	3	4	4	1	1	2	5	3	3	304
2	(United States) Peter Cunningham	10	8	1	1	4	6	2	1	3	1	3	3	3	2	4	3	2	2	282
3	(Australia) Neil Crompton	1	1	3	2	3	DSQ			5	2	2	1	2	3	1	1	1	1	280
4	(United States) Dominic Dobson	2	3	4	4	2	1	6	9	9	7	1	2	4	8	3	9	4	6	230
5	(United States) Randy Pobst	3	2	6	9	9	DNS	3	6	2	4	7	7	8	9	6	2	5	4	188
6	(United States) Bob Schader	5	7	7	7	7	3	7	4	6	8	8	9	9	7	8	6	7	8	185
7	(United States) David Welch	8	5	9	10	5	2	9	8	10	9	6	5	7	5	5	4	6	5	159
8	(United States) Darren Law	9	6	5	5	10	DNS	4	3	8	5	5	6	5	6	7	8	DNS	DNS	157
9	(United States) Forrest Granlund	11	DNS	10	6	8	4			4	6			6	4	DNS	DNS	DNS	DNS	88
10	(United States) Ron Emmick															9	7	8	7	37
11	(Canada) Mark Jonak	7	9	8	8															36
12	(New Zealand) Rod Millen							8	2											26
13	(United States) Tom Finnelly							5	5	DNS	DNS									24
14	(United States) Walter Puckett					6	7			7	DNS									21
15	(South Africa) Desiré Wilson	6	10	DNS	DNS							11	DNS							18
16	(Mexico) Roberto Quintanilla									DNS	DNS	9	8	DNS	DNS	DNS	DNS	DNS	DNS	17
17	(United States) Dave Jolly																	9	9	16
18	(United Kingdom) Paul Charsley															DNS	DNS	10	10	7
NC	(Canada) Doug Beatty											10	10							0
NC	(United States) Brian Battaglia			DNS	DNS	DNS	DNS													0
NC	(United States) Tommy Constantine	DNS	DNS																	0
Pos	Driver	LBH (United States)		SAV (United States)		DET (United States)		POR (United States)		CLE (United States)		TOR (Canada)		MOH (United States)		VAN (Canada)		LAG (United States)		Pts

Color	Result
Gold	Winner
Silver	2nd place
Bronze	3rd place
Green	4th & 5th place
Light Blue	6th-10th place
Dark Blue	Finished (Outside Top 10)
Purple	Did not finish
Red	Did not qualify (DNQ)
Brown	Withdrawn (Wth)
Black	Disqualified (DSQ)
White	Did not start (DNS)
Blank	Did not participate (DNP)
Blank	Not competing

=== Manufacturers Championship ===
Pos	Manufacturer	LBH (United States)		SAV (United States)		DET (United States)		POR (United States)		CLE (United States)		TOR (Canada)		MOH (United States)		VAN (Canada)		LAG (United States)		Pts
1	(Japan) Honda	1	1	1	1	3	4	2	1	3	1	2	1	2	2	1	1	1	1	298
2	(United States) Dodge	2	3	2	3	1	1	1	7	1	3	1	2	1	1	2	5	3	3	271
3	(Japan) Toyota							8	2											26
Pos	Manufacturer	LBH (United States)		SAV (United States)		DET (United States)		POR (United States)		CLE (United States)		TOR (Canada)		MOH (United States)		VAN (Canada)		LAG (United States)		Pts

== See also ==
- 1997 CART season
- 1997 Indy Lights season
- 1997 Formula Atlantic season
