= 1996 North American Touring Car Championship =

1996 NATCC season

Seasons
- ← none 1997 →

The 1996 North American Touring Car Championship was the first season of the North American Touring Car Championship. The series was organized by CART, and ran to Super Touring regulations. 16 rounds at 8 race meetings were organized, all but two (Lime Rock and Trois-Rivières) supporting the CART IndyCar World Series.

== Teams and drivers ==
Team	Car	No.	Drivers	Class	Rounds
Rod Millen Motorsports	Toyota Carina E	2	(New Zealand) Rod Millen	C	1–2, 4, 8
Archer Petty Motorsports	BMW 318is	3	(United States) Steve Petty	I	All
Leitzinger Racing	Ford Mondeo Ghia	5	(United States) Jeff Andretti	C	2–8
Ecurie Atlanta	Mercedes-Benz 190E	6	(United Kingdom) Martin Stretton	I	1
PacWest Touring Car Group	Dodge Stratus	7	(United States) Dominic Dobson	C	All
PacWest Touring Car Group	Dodge Stratus	8	(United States) David Donohue	C	All
Mirko Racing	Honda Accord	9	(United Kingdom) Albert Mirko	I	5–8
Delong Motorsports	BMW 318is	10	(Canada) Ed Delong	I	1–2, 4
Delong Motorsports	BMW 318is	20	(Canada) Jim Kenzie	I	4
TC Kline Racing	Honda Accord	12	(United States) Randy Pobst	C	All
TC Kline Racing	Honda Accord	21	(United Kingdom) Peter Hardman	C	1–7
Hartong Motorsports	BMW 318is	18	(United States) Darren Law	I	1–2, 4, 6–8
Motorsport Team Schemes	Vauxhall Cavalier	25	(United Kingdom) Nigel Smith	I	4, 6
Fastech Group Racing	Ford Mondeo	27	(Puerto Rico) Víctor González	C	3
Fastech Group Racing	Ford Mondeo	27	(United States) David Welch	C	5, 8
Fastech Group Racing	Ford Mondeo	27	(United Kingdom) Paul Charsley	C	6
Honda American Racing Team	Honda Accord	62	(United States) Forrest Granlund	C	1, 3–4
Honda American Racing Team	Honda Accord	62	(United States) Peter Cunningham	C	5–8
Metalcraft	Pontiac Sunfire	81	(United States) Dave Jolly	I	8
Team Contour Racing	Ford Contour	86	(United States) Chris Reinke	I	6–8

Icon	Class
C	Constructor
I	Independent

== Calendar ==
The calendar initially included an event at Charlotte Motor Speedway on May 20, as a support race for NASCAR's The Winston. By December 14, 1995, Charlotte was dropped from the calendar, replaced with a doubleheader at the Molson Indy Vancouver. The Portland event was added to the schedule on April 15.

Round		Date	Circuit	Location	Pole position	Winning driver	Winning team	Winning Constructor	Winning Independent	Winning Independent Team
1	1	May 27	(United States) Lime Rock Park	Lakeville, Connecticut	(United States) Dominic Dobson	(United States) David Donohue	PacWest Touring Car Group	(United States) Dodge	(United States) Steve Petty	Archer Petty Motorsports
1	2	May 27	(United States) Lime Rock Park	Lakeville, Connecticut	(United States) Dominic Dobson	(United States) Dominic Dobson	PacWest Touring Car Group	(United States) Dodge	(United States) Steve Petty	Archer Petty Motorsports
2	3	June 8	(United States) Raceway at Belle Isle Park	Detroit, Michigan	(United States) Randy Pobst	(United States) Darren Law	Hartong Motorsports	(United States) Dodge	(United States) Darren Law	Hartong Motorsports
2	4	June 8	(United States) Raceway at Belle Isle Park	Detroit, Michigan	(United States) Darren Law	(United States) Dominic Dobson	PacWest Touring Car Group	(United States) Dodge	(Canada) Ed Delong	Delong Motorsports
3	5	June 22	(United States) Portland International Raceway	Portland, Oregon	(United States) Randy Pobst	(United States) Randy Pobst	TC Kline Racing	(Japan) Honda	(United States) Steve Petty	Archer Petty Motorsports
3	6	June 22	(United States) Portland International Raceway	Portland, Oregon	(United States) Dominic Dobson	(United States) Randy Pobst	TC Kline Racing	(Japan) Honda	None	
4	7	July 13	(Canada) Toronto Street Circuit	Toronto, Ontario	(United States) Dominic Dobson	(United States) Randy Pobst	TC Kline Racing	(Japan) Honda	(United States) Steve Petty	Archer Petty Motorsports
4	8	July 13	(Canada) Toronto Street Circuit	Toronto, Ontario	(United States) Dominic Dobson	(United Kingdom) Peter Hardman	TC Kline Racing	(Japan) Honda	(United States) Steve Petty	Archer Petty Motorsports
5	9	August 3	(Canada) Circuit Trois-Rivières	Trois-Rivières, Quebec	(United States) David Donohue	(United States) Dominic Dobson	PacWest Touring Car Group	(United States) Dodge	(United States) Steve Petty	Archer Petty Motorsports
5	10	August 4	(Canada) Circuit Trois-Rivières	Trois-Rivières, Quebec	(United States) Randy Pobst	(United States) Randy Pobst	TC Kline Racing	(Japan) Honda	(United States) Steve Petty	Archer Petty Motorsports
6	11	August 10	(United States) Mid-Ohio Sports Car Course	Lexington, Ohio	(United States) Peter Cunningham	(United States) Peter Cunningham	Honda American Racing Team	(Japan) Honda	(United States) Darren Law	Hartong Motorsports
6	12	August 10	(United States) Mid-Ohio Sports Car Course	Lexington, Ohio	(United States) Randy Pobst	(United States) Peter Cunningham	Honda American Racing Team	(Japan) Honda	(United States) Darren Law	Hartong Motorsports
7	13	August 31	(Canada) Concord Pacific Place	Vancouver, British Columbia	(United States) Dominic Dobson	(United States) Dominic Dobson	PacWest Touring Car Group	(United States) Dodge	None	
7	14	September 1	(Canada) Concord Pacific Place	Vancouver, British Columbia	(United States) Dominic Dobson	(United States) Peter Cunningham	Honda American Racing Team	(Japan) Honda	(United States) Steve Petty	Archer Petty Motorsports
8	15	September 8	(United States) Laguna Seca Raceway	Monterey, California	(United States) Randy Pobst	(United States) Randy Pobst	TC Kline Racing	(Japan) Honda	(United States) Darren Law	Hartong Motorsports
8	16	September 8	(United States) Laguna Seca Raceway	Monterey, California	(United States) Peter Cunningham	(United States) Peter Cunningham	Honda American Racing Team	(Japan) Honda	(United States) Darren Law	Hartong Motorsports

== Championship standings ==
=== Drivers' Championship ===
Pos	Driver	Class	LRP (United States)		DET (United States)		POR (United States)		TOR (Canada)		TRV (Canada)		MOH (United States)		VAN (Canada)		LAG (United States)		Pts
1	(United States) Randy Pobst	C	2	3	**6**	**2**	**1***	1*	1	2*	3	**1***	10	**3***	2*	4	**1***	2	282
2	(United States) Dominic Dobson	C	**3**	**1***	4	1*	4	**5**	**2***	**3**	1*	2	3	4	**1**	**5**	3	9	241
3	(United States) David Donohue	**C**	1*	2	2	4	2	4	3	4	**7**	8	2	6	4	2	5	4	221
4	(United Kingdom) Peter Hardman	C	10	7	3	3	5	2	5	1	2	3	5	2	5	6			176
5	(United States) Peter Cunningham	C									4	6	**1***	1	3	1*	2	**1***	145
6	(United States) Steve Petty	I	5	6	DNS	DNS	8	8	6	7	6	4	8	7	7	3	8	DNS	139
7	(United States) Jeff Andretti	C			5	6	6	6	DNS	DNS	9	5	6	10	6	7	9	5	106
8	(United States) Darren Law	I	9	8	1*	**8**			9	8			4	5	8	DNS	7	6	95
9	(United States) Forrest Granlund	C	4	4			3	3	5	7									78
10	(New Zealand) Rod Millen	C	8	5	8	5			4	6							4	10	63
11	(United States) David Welch	C									5	7					6	3	48
12	(Canada) Ed Delong	I	7	9	7	7			8	9									47
13	(United Kingdom) Nigel Smith	I							10	DNS			9	9					23
14	(United States) Víctor González	C					7	7											20
15	(United Kingdom) Paul Charsley	C											7	8					19
16	(United Kingdom) Albert Mirko	I									8	DNS	11	11			10	7	17
17	(United States) Martin Stretton	I	6	DNS															11
18	(United States) Dave Jolly	I															11	8	6
NC	(Canada) Jim Kenzie	I							11	DNS									0
NC	(United States) Chris Reinke	I											DNS	DNS	DNS	DNS	DNS	DNS	0
Pos	Driver	Class	LRP (United States)		DET (United States)		POR (United States)		TOR (Canada)		TRV (Canada)		MOH (United States)		VAN (Canada)		LAG (United States)		Pts

Color	Result
Gold	Winner
Silver	2nd place
Bronze	3rd place
Green	4th & 5th place
Light Blue	6th-10th place
Dark Blue	Finished (Outside Top 10)
Purple	Did not finish
Red	Did not qualify (DNQ)
Brown	Withdrawn (Wth)
Black	Disqualified (DSQ)
White	Did not start (DNS)
Blank	Did not participate (DNP)
Blank	Not competing

**In-line notation**
**Bold**	Pole position
Italics	Ran fastest race lap
*	Led most race laps

=== Manufacturers' Championship ===
Pos	Manufacturer	LRP (United States)		DET (United States)		POR (United States)		TOR (Canada)		TRV (Canada)		MOH (United States)		VAN (Canada)		LAG (United States)		Pts
1	(Japan) Honda	2	3	3	2	1	1	1	1	2	1	1	1	2	1	1	1	298
2	(United States) Dodge	1	1	2	1	2	4	2	3	1	2	2	4	1	2	3	4	271
3	(United States) Ford			5	6	6	6			5	5	6	8	6	7	6	3	136
4	(Japan) Toyota	8	5	8	5			4	6							4	10	63
Pos	Manufacturer	LRP (United States)		DET (United States)		POR (United States)		TOR (Canada)		TRV (Canada)		MOH (United States)		VAN (Canada)		LAG (United States)		Pts

== See also ==
- 1996 IndyCar season
- 1996 Indy Lights season
- 1996 Formula Atlantic season
