= Toronto Street Circuit =

Defunct street circuit in Toronto, Canada

Exhibition Place
- Grand Prix Circuit (1996–2025)

- Grand Prix Circuit (1986–1995)
- Location: Toronto, Ontario, Canada
- Coordinates: 43°38′14″N 79°24′56″W
- Capacity: 73,000
- Opened: 20 July 1986; 40 years ago
- Closed: 20 July 2025; 14 months ago
- Major events: IndyCar Series; Grand Prix of Toronto (1986–2007, 2009–2019, 2022–2025); NASCAR Pinty's Series (2010–2011, 2016–2019, 2022–2023); Stadium Super Trucks (2013–2016, 2019); Pirelli World Challenge (2007, 2010, 2013–2014); Trans-Am Series (1993–1994, 2004–2005, 2010)

Grand Prix Circuit (1996–2025)
- Surface: Asphalt/Concrete
- Length: 1.755 mi (2.824 km)
- Turns: 11
- Race lap record: 0:58.806 ( (Brazil) Cristiano da Matta, Lola B02/00, 2002, CART)

Original Grand Prix Circuit (1986–1995)
- Surface: Asphalt/Concrete
- Length: 1.784 mi (2.871 km)
- Turns: 11
- Race lap record: 0:58.830 ( (United States) Bobby Rahal, Lola T95/00, 1995, CART)

Exhibition Place in Toronto hosted American open-wheel car racing, sanctioned by IndyCar and formerly ran as the Ontario Honda Dealers Indy Toronto. It was held from 1986 to 2025. The race was held annually in July from 1986 to 2025. In addition to the IndyCar race, several support races were also held, including Indy NXT and the NASCAR Canada Series, as well as vendor exhibits, concerts, and other off-track activities. The street circuit used local roads that wound through and around Exhibition Place and was commonly referred to as the "Streets of Toronto". The race festival took place on a weekend, with the roads closed from Thursday until Monday.

Toronto was classified as an FIA Grade Two circuit.

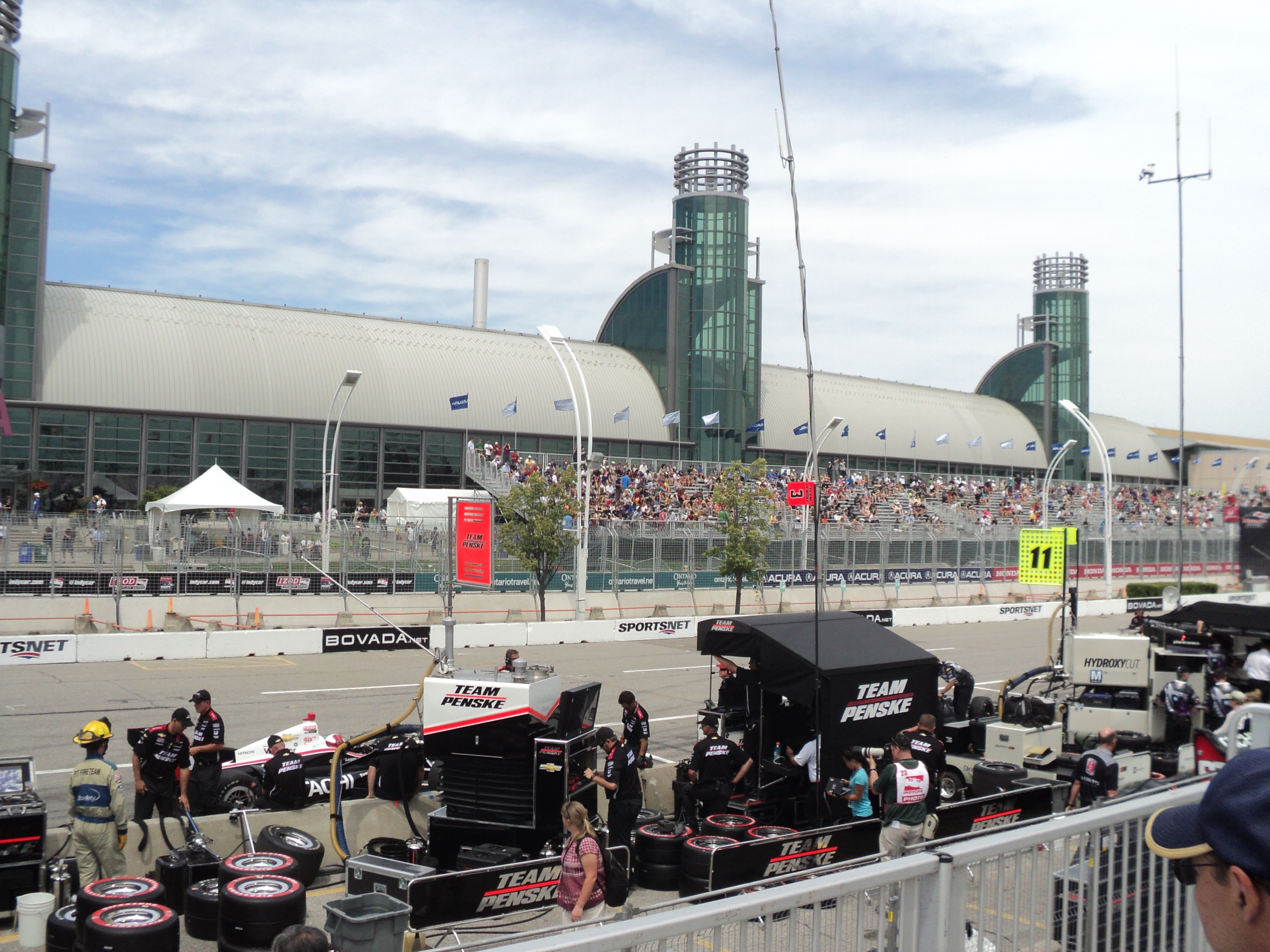
The 2013 Honda IndyCar race at Exhibition Place.

== Circuit ==
The start/finish line was located on Princes' Boulevard, slightly west of Newfoundland Drive. From the Start/Finish line, drivers head east towards the Princes' Gates, turning right (south) onto Canada Boulevard before reaching the gate. From Canada Boulevard, the track goes right onto Lake Shore Boulevard (west) which comprises the longest straightaway on the circuit (this straightaway is sometimes incorrectly referred to as Shoreline Drive during race telecasts; Shoreline Drive is the start-finish straight at the Grand Prix of Long Beach). Drivers re-enter the Exhibition grounds at Ontario Drive, heading north towards Prince's Boulevard where they turn left (west). The circuit continues on to Manitoba Drive and heads north-east then east until reaching Nova Scotia Avenue. At Nova Scotia Avenue, drivers turn right (south) then navigate a left-right-left series of turns until rejoining Prince's Boulevard and heading east towards the start/finish line.

Exhibition Place is one of eight Canadian circuits to have held an Indy/Champ Car race, the others being Mosport, Concord Pacific Place in Vancouver, Edmonton City Centre Airport, Circuit Gilles Villeneuve in Montreal, Circuit Mont-Tremblant, Sanair Super Speedway, and Markham (coming in 2026).

== Lap records ==
The unofficial track record is 0:57.143, set by Gil de Ferran in a Reynard 99I, during qualifying for the 1999 Molson Indy Toronto. The fastest official race lap records at the Exhibition Place are listed as:

Category	Time	Driver	Vehicle	Event
Second Grand Prix Circuit (1996–2025): 2.824 km (1.755 mi)
CART	0:58.806	Cristiano da Matta	Lola B02/00	2002 Molson Indy Toronto
IndyCar	0:59.7140	Will Power	Dallara IR-18	2018 Honda Indy Toronto
Indy Lights	1:04.0124	Esteban Guerrieri	Dallara IPS	2011 Toronto 100
Formula Atlantic	1:05.487	Graham Rahal	Swift 016.a	2006 Toronto Formula Atlantic round
Indy Pro 2000	1:07.0213	Rasmus Lindh	Tatuus PM-18	2019 Indy Pro 2000 Grand Prix of Toronto
US F2000	1:10.9853	Rasmus Lindh	Tatuus USF-17	2018 US F2000 Grand Prix of Toronto
Porsche Carrera Cup	1:11.501	Trenton Estep	Porsche 911 (992 I) GT3 Cup	2022 Toronto Porsche Carrera Cup North America round
Barber Pro	1:11.771	A. J. Allmendinger	Reynard 98E	2002 Toronto Barber Pro round
Trans-Am	1:12.149	Paul Gentilozzi	Jaguar XKR	2004 Toronto Trans-Am round
Radical Cup	1:14.042	Jon Field	Radical SR3 SRX	2023 Toronto Radical Cup North America round
Super Touring	1:15.599	Randy Pobst	Honda Accord	1996 Toronto NATCC round
GT4	1:16.730	Charles Robin	Mercedes-AMG GT4	2022 Toronto Sports Car Championship Canada round
TCR Touring Car	1:17.473	Richard Boake	Audi RS 3 LMS TCR (2021)	2023 Toronto Sports Car Championship Canada round
F1600	1:18.440	Edouard Aube	EuroSwift SC92	1998 Toronto Canadian F1600 round
Mazda MX-5 Cup	1:24.7092	Matt Cresci	Mazda MX-5 (ND)	2017 Toronto Mazda MX-5 Cup round
Original Grand Prix Circuit: 2.871 km (1986–1995): 2.871 km (1.784 mi)
CART	0:58.830	Bobby Rahal	Lola T95/00	1995 Molson Indy Toronto
Indy Lights	1:03.799	Robbie Buhl	Lola T93/20	1995 Toronto Indy Lights round
Formula Atlantic	1:04.708	Jacques Villeneuve	Ralt RT40	1993 Toronto Formula Atlantic round
Trans-Am	1:10.553	Scott Pruett	Chevrolet Camaro	1994 Toronto Trans-Am round

== Former series ==
A variety of racing series have previously run as support series on the race weekend. These include:

- Champ Car World Series (1986–2007)
- Indy Lights (1986–1999, 2001, 2009–2019)
- Canadian Formula Ford Championship (1987, 1998–2000, 2002–2003)
- SCCA Corvette Challenge (1989)
- Atlantic Championship (1990–2007)
- Trans-Am Series (1993–1994, 2004–2005, 2010)
- North American Touring Car Championship (1996–1997)
- Motorola Cup (1998–2000)
- CASCAR Super Series (1999–2005)
- Barber Dodge Pro Series (2001–2003)
- North American Fran Am 2000 Pro Championship (2003–2004)
- USF2000 Championship (2006, 2013–2019, 2022–2025)
- Pirelli World Challenge (2007, 2010, 2013–2014)
- USF Pro 2000 Championship (2007, 2012–2013, 2015–2016, 2018–2019, 2022–2025)
- IndyCar Series (2009–2019, 2022–2025)
- Canadian Touring Car Championship (2009–2011, 2015)
- NASCAR Pinty's Series (2010–2011, 2016–2019, 2022–2023)
- Ferrari Challenge North America (2011–2012)
- Stadium Super Trucks (2013–2016, 2019)
- Porsche GT3 Cup Challenge Canada (2014–2019)
- F1600 Super Series (2014)
- Mazda MX-5 Cup (2017)
- Porsche Carrera Cup North America (2022)
- Sports Car Championship Canada (2022–2024)
- Radical Cup North America (2023–2024)
- Radical Cup Canada (2023–2025)
- Miata Canada Cup (2025)
