= David Donohue =

American race car driver

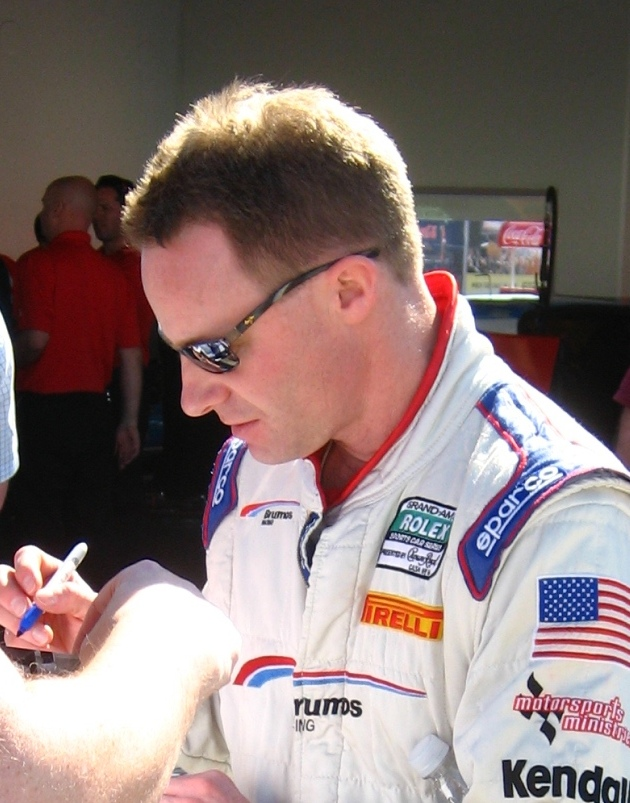
- Donohue during the 2010 24 Hours of Daytona
- Nationality: (United States) American
- Born: David Neary Donohue; January 5, 1967 (age 59) Morristown, New Jersey, U.S.
- Relatives: Mark Donohue (father)
- Categorisation: FIA Gold (until 2017); FIA Silver (2018); FIA Bronze (2019–)
24 Hours of Le Mans career
- Years: 1998–2000, 2002
- Teams: Viper Team Oreca, Panoz Motor Sports
- Best finish: 9th (2000)
- Class wins: 1

David Neary Donohue (born January 5, 1967, in Morristown, New Jersey) is an American race car driver.

The son of Mark Donohue, he was formerly active at Le Mans as a Viper Team Oreca factory driver, and in Grand-Am's DP class, where he won the 2009 24 Hours of Daytona for Brumos Racing. More recently, Donohue has participated in the Pikes Peak International Hill Climb, where he holds the Time Attack 1 division record.

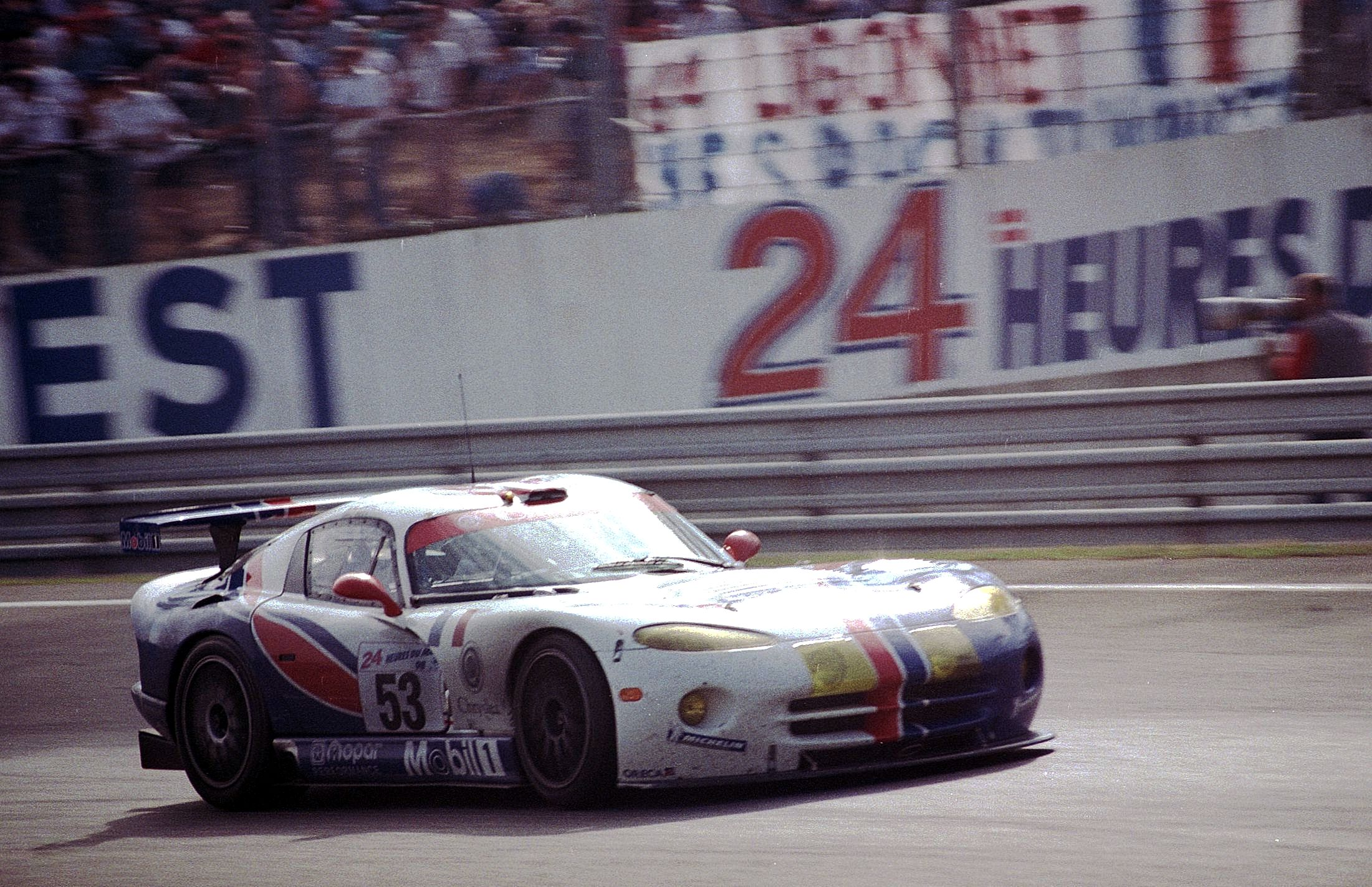
Donohue won the GT2 class on his 24 Hours of Le Mans debut in 1998.

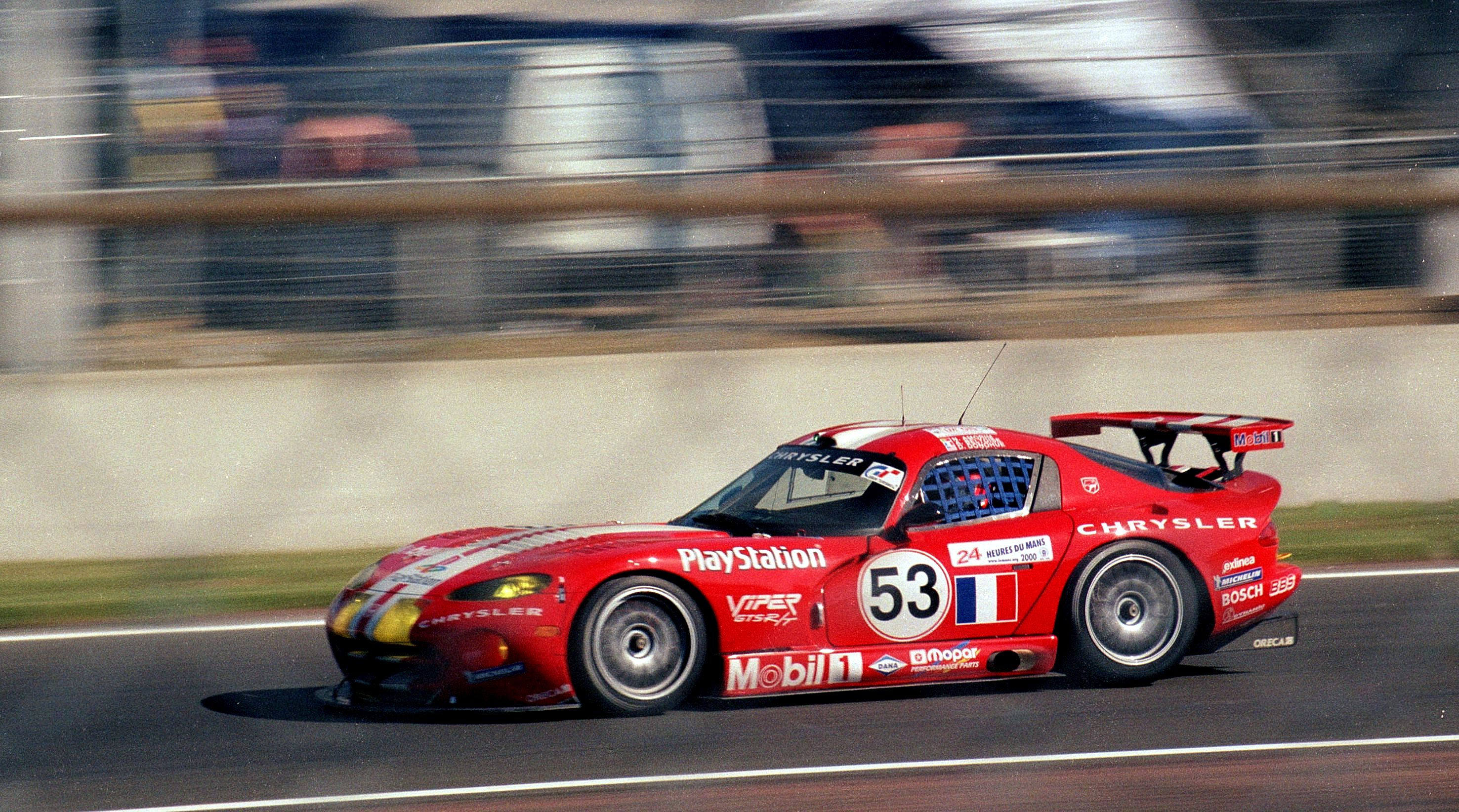
Donohue driving for Viper Team Oreca at Le Mans in 2000.

== Career ==
The son of racing legend Mark Donohue, David Donohue has accomplished much in a wide variety of auto racing series and classes, including NASCAR's Busch Series and Craftsman Truck Series, as well as winning the GT2 class at the 1998 running of the 24 Hours of Le Mans. Almost exactly 40 years after his father won the 24 Hours of Daytona, David won the 2009 event driving a Brumos-entered Riley-Porsche teamed with Antonio García, Darren Law and Buddy Rice. After starting the race from pole position, Donohue's 0.167-second margin of victory over Juan Pablo Montoya was the closest in the race's history by over a minute, and the closest finish in the history of major international 24-hour motorsports events. In 2013, Donohue drove in the first GX class race at the 24 hour of Daytona. His car, the No. 16 Napleton Porsche Cayman S, won by a nine lap lead.

== Motorsports career results ==
=== North American Touring Car Championship ===
(key)

North American Touring Car Championship results
| Year | Team | No. | Car | 1 | 2 | 3 | 4 | 5 | 6 | 7 | 8 | 9 | 10 | 11 | 12 | 13 | 14 | 15 | 16 | 17 | 18 | NATCC | Pts |
|---|---|---|---|---|---|---|---|---|---|---|---|---|---|---|---|---|---|---|---|---|---|---|---|
| 1996 | PacWest Racing | 8 | Dodge Stratus | LRP; 1 | LRP; 2 | DET; 2 | DET; 4 | PIR; 2 | PIR; 4 | TOR; 3 | TOR; 4 | TRV; 7 | TRV; 8 | MOH; 2 | MOH; 6 | VAN; 4 | VAN; 2 | LS; 5 | LS; 4 | | | 3rd | 221 |
| 1997 | PacWest Racing | 8 | Dodge Stratus | LBH; 4 | LBH; 4 | SAV; 2 | SAV; 3 | DET; 1^{*} | DET; 5 | PIR; 1^{*} | PIR; 7^{*} | CLE; 1 | CLE; 3 | TOR; 4 | TOR; 4 | MOH; 1 | MOH; 1 | VAN; 2 | VAN; 5 | LS; 3 | LS; 3 | 1st | 304 |

=== 24 Hours of Le Mans results ===
| Year | Team | Co-Drivers | Car | Class | Laps | Pos. | Class Pos. |
|---|---|---|---|---|---|---|---|
| 1998 | (France) Viper Team Oreca | (United Kingdom) Justin Bell (Italy) Luca Drudi | Chrysler Viper GTS-R | GT2 | 317 | 11th | **1st** |
| 1999 | (France) Viper Team Oreca | (France) Jean-Philippe Belloc (France) Soheil Ayari | Chrysler Viper GTS-R | GTS | 271 | DNF | DNF |
| 2000 | (France) Viper Team Oreca | (Portugal) Ni Amorim (France) Anthony Beltoise | Chrysler Viper GTS-R | GTS | 328 | 9th | **2nd** |
| 2002 | (United States) Panoz Motor Sports | (United States) Bill Auberlen (United States) Gunnar Jeannette | Panoz LMP01 Evo | LMP900 | 230 | DNF | DNF |

=== NASCAR ===
(key) (Bold - Pole position awarded by qualifying time. Italics - Pole position earned by points standings or practice time. * – Most laps led.)

==== Busch Series ====
NASCAR Busch Series results
| Year | Team | No. | Make | 1 | 2 | 3 | 4 | 5 | 6 | 7 | 8 | 9 | 10 | 11 | 12 | 13 | 14 | 15 | 16 | 17 | 18 | 19 | 20 | 21 | 22 | 23 | 24 | 25 | 26 | 27 | 28 | 29 | 30 | 31 | 32 | 33 | NBSC | Pts | Ref |
|---|---|---|---|---|---|---|---|---|---|---|---|---|---|---|---|---|---|---|---|---|---|---|---|---|---|---|---|---|---|---|---|---|---|---|---|---|---|---|---|
| 1992 | N/A | 67 | Olds | DAY | CAR | RCH | ATL | MAR | DAR | BRI | HCY | LAN | DUB | NZH; 16 | CLT | DOV | ROU | MYB | GLN; 31 | VOL | NHA | TAL | IRP | ROU | MCH | NHA | BRI | DAR | | | | | | | | | 59th | 325 | |
| 1992 | Mark Thomas | 96 | Olds | | | | | | | | | | | | | | | | | | | | | | | | | | RCH; DNQ | DOV; 24 | CLT | MAR | CAR; 38 | HCY | | | 59th | 325 | |
| 1993 | Mark Thomas | 96 | Olds | DAY | CAR | RCH | DAR | BRI | HCY | ROU | MAR | NZH; 31 | CLT | DOV | MYB | GLN; 30 | MLW | TAL | IRP | MCH | NHA | BRI | DAR | RCH | DOV | ROU | CLT | MAR | CAR | HCY | ATL | | | | | | 79th | 143 | |
| 2001 | Team Rensi Motorsports | 25 | Chevy | DAY | CAR | LVS | ATL | DAR | BRI | TEX | NSH; 32 | TAL; 33 | CAL; 27 | RCH; 36 | NHA; 33 | NZH; 27 | CLT; 20 | DOV; 32 | KEN; 32 | MLW; 21 | GLN; 15 | CHI; 34 | GTY | PPR | IRP | MCH | BRI | DAR | RCH | DOV | KAN | CLT | MEM | PHO | CAR | HOM | 43rd | 935 | |

==== Craftsman Truck Series ====
NASCAR Craftsman Truck Series results
| Year | Team | No. | Make | 1 | 2 | 3 | 4 | 5 | 6 | 7 | 8 | 9 | 10 | 11 | 12 | 13 | 14 | 15 | 16 | 17 | 18 | 19 | 20 | 21 | 22 | 23 | 24 | NCTC | Pts | Ref |
|---|---|---|---|---|---|---|---|---|---|---|---|---|---|---|---|---|---|---|---|---|---|---|---|---|---|---|---|---|---|---|
| 2001 | Team Rensi Motorsports | 16 | Chevy | DAY; 28 | HOM; 31 | MMR; 21 | MAR | GTY | DAR | PPR | DOV | TEX | MEM | MLW | KAN | KEN | NHA | IRP | NSH | CIC | NZH | RCH | SBO | TEX | LVS | PHO | CAL | 68th | 237 | |

==== Busch North Series ====
NASCAR Busch North Series results
| Year | Team | No. | Make | 1 | 2 | 3 | 4 | 5 | 6 | 7 | 8 | 9 | 10 | 11 | 12 | 13 | 14 | 15 | 16 | 17 | 18 | 19 | 20 | NBNSC | Pts | Ref |
|---|---|---|---|---|---|---|---|---|---|---|---|---|---|---|---|---|---|---|---|---|---|---|---|---|---|---|
| 1992 | N/A | 67 | Olds | DAY | CAR | RCH | NHA; 20 | NZH | MND | OXF; 19 | DOV | LEE | JEN; 19 | OXF | NHA | OXF; 13 | HOL | EPP | NHA | RPS | OXF | NHA | EPP | 30th | 613 | |

=== ARCA Bondo/Mar-Hyde Series ===
(key) (Bold – Pole position awarded by qualifying time. Italics – Pole position earned by points standings or practice time. * – Most laps led.)

ARCA Bondo/Mar-Hyde Series results
| Year | Team | No. | Make | 1 | 2 | 3 | 4 | 5 | 6 | 7 | 8 | 9 | 10 | 11 | 12 | 13 | 14 | 15 | 16 | 17 | 18 | 19 | 20 | ABMHC | Pts | Ref |
|---|---|---|---|---|---|---|---|---|---|---|---|---|---|---|---|---|---|---|---|---|---|---|---|---|---|---|
| 2000 | Team Rensi Motorsports | 83 | Pontiac | DAY | SLM | AND | CLT | KIL | FRS | MCH | POC | TOL | KEN | BLN | POC | WIN | ISF | KEN | DSF | SLM | CLT; 41 | TAL | ATL | 147th | 30 | |

=== Pikes Peak International Hill Climb ===
Donohue continues to race in the annual Pikes Peak Hill Climb in Colorado.

| Year | Car | Class | Time | Class pos. | Overall pos. |
|---|---|---|---|---|---|
| 2017 | 2014 Porsche 911 Turbo S | Time Attack-Time Attack 1 | 9:49.954 | **2nd** | 6th |
| 2018 | 2017 Porsche GT3 R | Time Attack-Time Attack 1 | 9:37.152 | **1st** | 6th |
| 2019 | 2016 Porsche 911 | Pikes Peak Open | 9:33.404 | 2nd | 4th |
| 2020 | 2019 Porsche GT2 RS Clubsport | Time Attack-Time Attack 1 | DNF | 9th | 43rd |
| 2021 | 2019 Porsche GT2 RS Clubsport | Time Attack-Time Attack 1 | 6:45.893 (Note: The distance raced in the 2021 event was shortened due to inclement weather. The lap was completed at Devil's Playground.) | 3rd | 8th |
| 2022 | 2019 Porsche GT2 RS Clubsport | Time Attack-Time Attack 1 | 10:35.830 | **1st** | 3rd |
| 2023 | 2019 Porsche GT2 RS Clubsport | Time Attack-Time Attack 1 | 9:18.053 | **1st** | 4th |
| 2024 | 2014 Porsche 911 Turbo R | Time Attack-Time Attack 1 | 9:49.429 | **1st** | 7th |

Sporting positions
| Preceded by Randy Pobst | North American Touring Car Championship Champion; 1997 | Succeeded by Final |
