= Jeff Andretti =

American racing driver

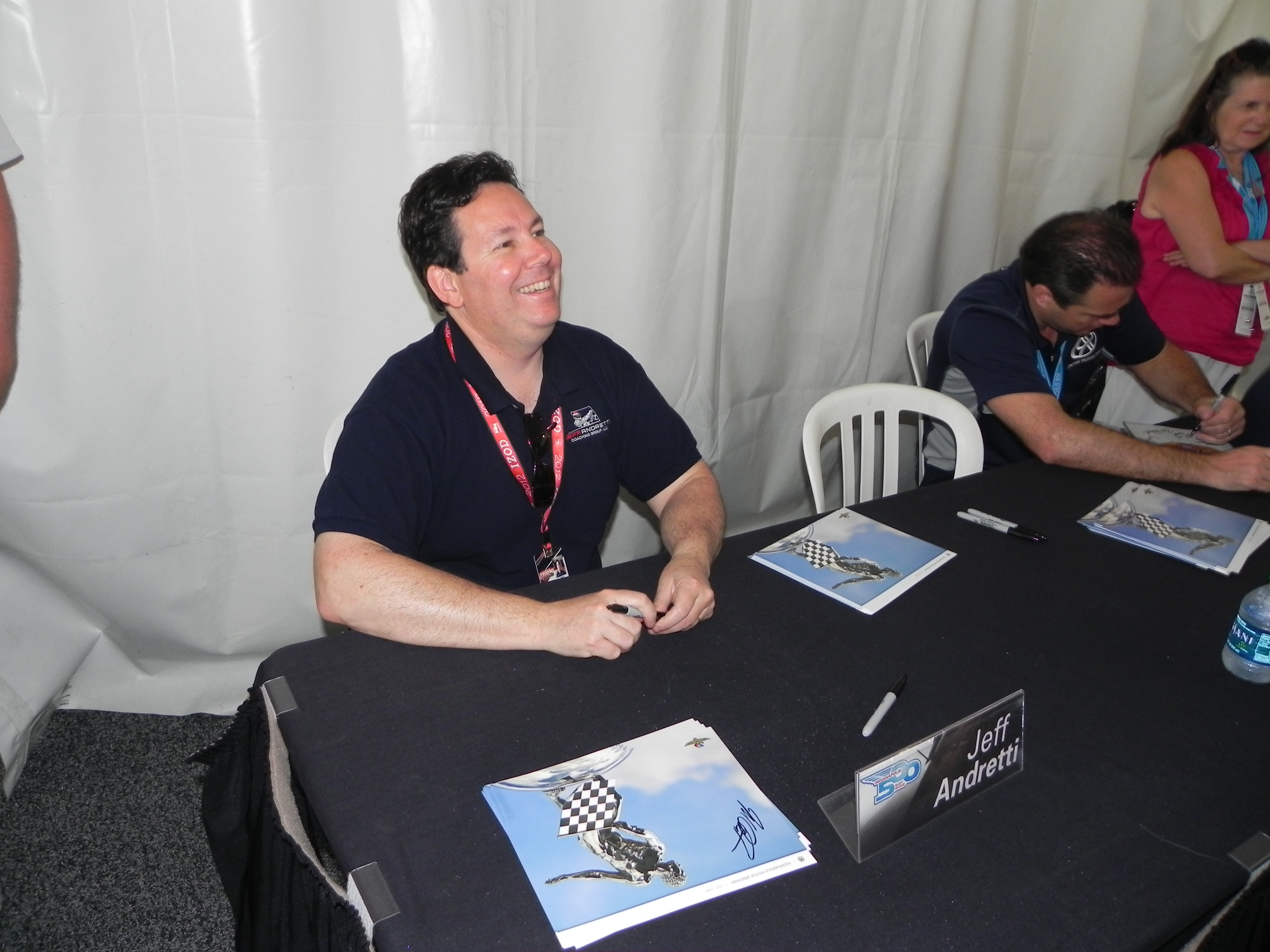
- Andretti in 2012
- Nationality: (United States) American
- Born: April 14, 1964 (age 62); Bethlehem, Pennsylvania, U.S.
- Awards: 1991 Indianapolis 500 Rookie of the Year; 1991 CART Jim Trueman Rookie of the Year

Champ Car career
- 21 races run over 5 years
- Years active: 1990–1994
- Teams: TEAMKAR International (1990); Bayside Motorsports (1991); A. J. Foyt Racing (1992); Pagan Racing (1993); Euromotorsports, Hemelgarn Racing (1994)
- Best finish: 15th (1991)
- First race: 1990 Miller Genuine Draft 200 (Milwaukee)
- Last race: 1994 Slick 50 200 (Phoenix)
| Wins | Podiums | Poles |
|---|---|---|
| 0 | 0 | 0 |

NASCAR FedEx Freight Truck Series career
- 3 races run over 1 year
- Best finish: 64th (1999)
- First race: 1999 Pronto Auto Parts 400K (Texas)
- Last race: 1999 NAPA Autocare 200 (Nazareth)
| Wins | Top tens | Poles |
|---|---|---|
| 0 | 0 | 0 |

Jeff Andretti (born April 14, 1964) is an American former professional race car driver. He competed in the Champ Car World Series and was the series' Rookie of the Year in 1991.

== Early life and education ==
Andretti was born in Bethlehem, Pennsylvania, on April 14, 1964, the youngest son of Dee Ann (Hoch) and Italian-born 1969 Indianapolis 500 and 1978 Formula 1 World Champion Mario Andretti. His older brother is Michael Andretti, and his uncle is Aldo Andretti. His nephew is Marco Andretti, who is the son of his brother, Michael. He is also the cousin of Aldo's two sons, John Andretti and Adam Andretti. The Andretti family became the first family to have four relatives (Michael, Mario, Jeff, and John) to compete in the same series, which occurred during the CART series.

== Career ==
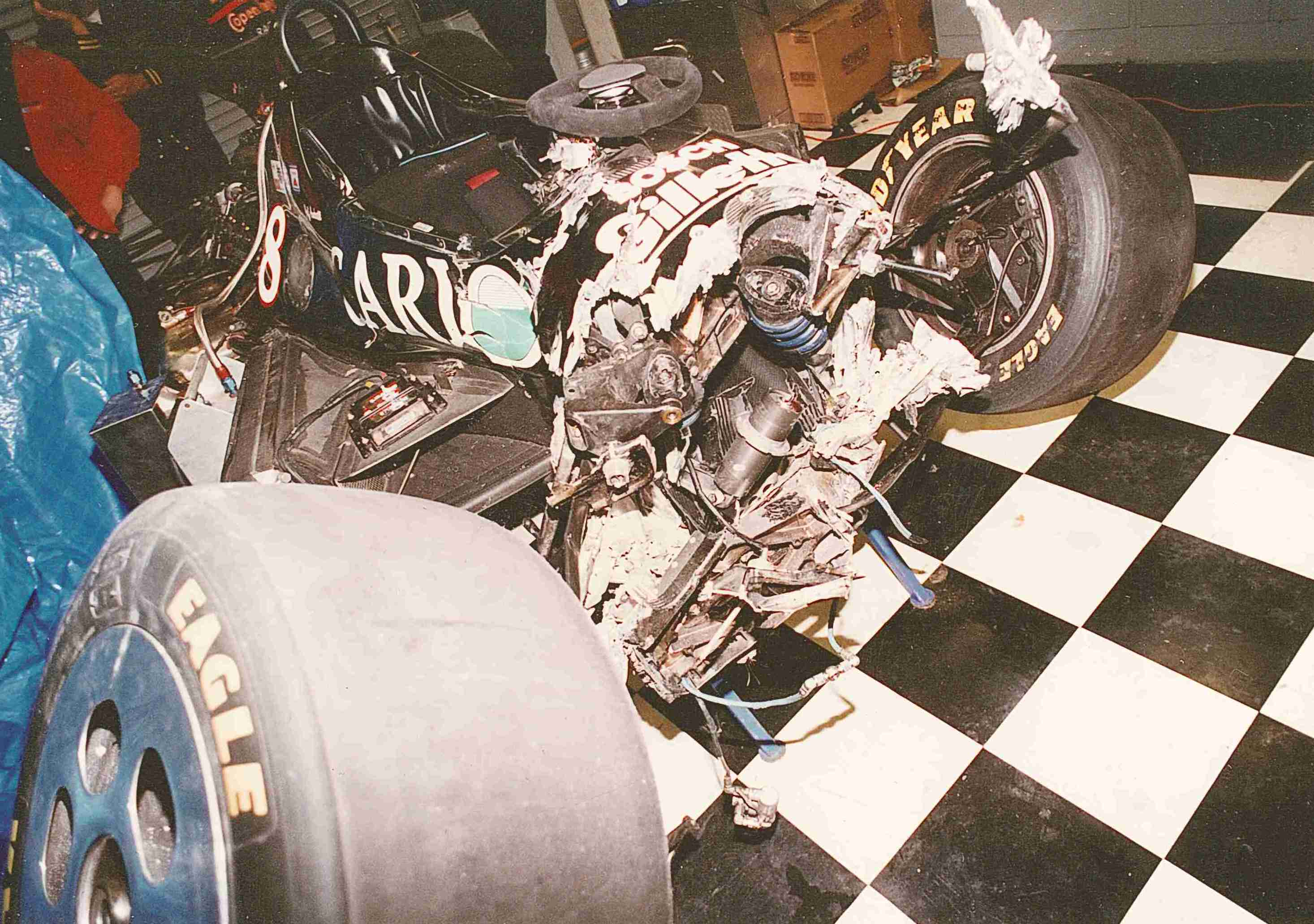
The aftermath of Andretti's crash at Indianapolis Motor Speedway during the 1992 Indianapolis 500

In 1983, Andretti was racing in Formula Fords, winning both the USAC Pro Ford Championship and the Skip Barber Formula Ford Eastern Series. After qualifying for his Sports Car Club of America national license in 1984, he won the Northeast Division title in Formula Ford. In November, he made his Formula Super Vee debut, at Caesars Palace, Las Vegas.

Andretti continued in Formula Super Vee the following season, with the Ralt America outfit, winning the third race of the season, on the Milwaukee Mile. In the CART race at the same event, Mario did the same, marking the first time a father and son had started from pole and won races on the same track, in the same weekend. Andretti would also win in Cleveland and Phoenix, on his way the fifth in the Robert Bosch/Valvoline Championship.

In 1986, Andretti moved into the new American Racing Series with Ralph Sanchez Racing. Like his Milwaukee win the previous year, his only race win was a "family affair". He earned his first ARS victory, at Pocono, as his father won the CART race at the same meeting, after his brother, Michael had started from pole, giving the Andretti family a "clean sweep". Andretti went on to finish second the overall ARS standings. For 1987, Andretti switched to Arciero Racing for another attempt at ARS, winning the opening race of the season, in Phoenix. He would revisit the top step of the podium in the series finale, in the race around Tamiami Park, Miami, snatching second place in the championship away from Tommy Byrne in the process.

In 1989, Andretti competed in the Toyota Atlantic, while developing a new chassis. Although the season was winless, he did earn Rookie of the Year honours, on his way to sixth in the Atlantic Division.

Andretti moved into the CART ranks in 1990, joining his father and brother, making racing history, making it the first time a father has competed against his two sons in a CART race. After failing to qualify for the Indianapolis 500, he make his race debut with TEAMKAR International in their Lola-Cosworth T89/00 in the Miller Genuine Draft 200 on the Milwaukee Mile, only to suffer mechanical problems and not finish. He sat out the rest of the season, returning in 1991, doing a full season with Bayside Disposal Racing, driving their Texaco Havoline Star sponsored Lola-Cosworth T91/00. With four top ten finishes throughout the season, three of which were the first three races, the best being a 7th place in the Gold Coast IndyCar Grand Prix; the race incidentally won by his cousin, John, earning the CART Rookie of the Year title.

In May 1991, Andretti qualified 11th for the Indianapolis 500, coupled with an outstanding performance before mechanical problems earned him the Indy 500 Rookie of the Year title. He followed Mario and Michael in making it the first time ever that three members of the same family had achieved this.

Earlier that year, Jeff joined Mario and Michael to race for Jochen Dauer Racing in the SunBank 24 at Daytona. Although their Porsche 962C was classified in fifth place, they failed to finish due to overheating.

Without a full-time drive for 1992, Andretti returned to the Indianapolis Motor Speedway with A. J. Foyt Enterprises. However, he became yet another victim of the infamous Andretti curse at the famed race track when on lap 109, a right rear wheel came loose off his car at turn 2 and he crashed violently head-on into the wall, smashing both his legs. He spent three weeks at the Methodist Hospital in Indianapolis, before the long road to recovery, determined to race again in 1993.

It was February 1993, when Andretti set the unofficial closed-course speed record for IndyCars of 234.50 mph, the fastest speed ever recorded at Texas World Speedway, while testing for the Indianapolis 500. This marked his first time back in an IndyCar since the accident the previous year. Andretti's fast run came at the conclusion of two days of testing where he consistently posted laps in the 230 mph range. Andretti's Buick-powered Lola was prepared by Pagan Racing. It was at the Indy, that Andretti made his complete his comeback, only to record a third straight DNF.

The accident severely hampered Andretti's career, at least in terms of his competitiveness, since he was never the same afterwards. In 1994, Jeff did a one-off race with Euromotorsports, finishing 17th in the Slick 50 200, held at Phoenix Raceway, 21 laps adrift. In May 1994, Jeff switched to Hemelgarn Racing, but his bid for a fourth consecutive start failed due to a blown Buick engine.

Andretti returned to racing full-time at the Indy Lights with Canaska Racing in 1995, but recorded just one top-ten finish. In 1996, he stepped away from open-wheel racing and joined the tin-top brigade, racing to seventh place overall in the North American Touring Car Championship in a Leitzinger Racing prepared Ford Mondeo. After a gap of three year, he moved to the NASCAR Craftsman Truck Series, driving the No. 94 Chevrolet for Enerjetix Motorsports, he raced in three events in 1999, posting a best finish of 30th at the Milwaukee Mile.

Andretti is now retired from competitive racing, and works as a driving instructor.

== Racing record ==
=== Career highlights ===
| Season | Series | Position | Team | Car |
|---|---|---|---|---|
| 1985 | Robert Bosch Formula Super Vee Championship | 5th | Ralt American | Ralt-Volkswagen RT5 |
| 1986 | CART American Racing Series | 2nd | Ralph Sanchez Racing | March-Buick 86A/2 |
| 1987 | CART American Racing Series | 2nd | Arciero Racing | March-Buick 86A |
| 1988 | HFC American Racing Series | 21st | Hemelgarn Racing; Agapiou Racing | March-Buick 86A |
| 1989 | SCCA Toyota Atlantic Championship - Atlantic Division | 6th | Newman Racing | Reynard-Toyota 89H |
| | HFC American Racing Series | 27th | Baci Racing | March-Buick 86A |
| 1990 | CART PPG Indy Car World Series | 38th | TEAMKAR International | Lola-Cosworth T89/00 |
| 1991 | CART PPG Indy Car World Series | 15th | Bayside Disposal Racing | Lola-Cosworth T91/00 |
| | USAC Gold Crown Series | 15th | Bayside Disposal Racing | Lola-Cosworth T91/00 |
| | Camel GT Championship season | 29th | Jochen Dauer Racing | Porsche 962C |
| 1992 | USAC Gold Crown Series | 18th | A. J. Foyt Enterprises | Lola-Chevrolet T91/00 |
| | CART PPG Indy Car World Series | 49th | A. J. Foyt Enterprises | Lola-Chevrolet T91/00 |
| 1993 | USAC Gold Crown Series | 29th | Pagan Racing | Lola-Buick T92/00 |
| | CART PPG Indy Car World Series | 53rd | Pagan Racing | Lola-Buick T92/00 |
| 1994 | CART PPG Indy Car World Series | 44th | Euromotosport; Hemelgarn Racing | Lola-Ilmor T93/00; Lola-Buick T92/00 |
| 1995 | PPG/Firestone Indy Lights Championship powered by Buick | 19th | Camaska Racing | Lola-Buick T93/20 |
| 1996 | North American Touring Car Championship | 7th | Leitzinger Racing | Ford Mondeo Ghia |
| 1999 | NASCAR Craftsman Truck Series | 64th | Enerjetix Motorsports | Chevrolet Silverado |

=== SCCA National Championship Runoffs ===
| Year | Track | Car | Engine | Class | Finish | Start | Status |
|---|---|---|---|---|---|---|---|
| 1984 | Road Atlanta | Swift DB1 | Ford | Formula Ford | 35 | 2 | Retired |

=== Complete 24 Hours of Daytona results ===
| Year | Team | Co-Drivers | Car | Class | Laps | Pos. | Class Pos. |
|---|---|---|---|---|---|---|---|
| 1984 | (United States) 901 Shop | (United States) Mike Schaefer (United States) Nick Nicholson (United States) Jeff Refenning | Porsche 911 SC | GTU | 258 | 43rd (DNF) | 12th (DNF) |
| 1988 | (Italy) Buick Momo March | (United States) Steve Phillips (Republic of Ireland) Michael Roe | March-Buick 86G | GTP | 485 | 53rd (DNF) | 14th (DNF) |
| 1991 | (West Germany) Jochen Dauer Racing | (United States) Mario Andretti (United States) Michael Andretti | Porsche 962C | GTP | 663 | 5th (DNF) | 3rd (DNF) |

=== Complete 12 Hours of Sebring results ===
| Year | Team | Co-Drivers | Car | Class | Laps | Pos. | Class Pos. |
|---|---|---|---|---|---|---|---|
| 1993 | (United States) Auto Toy Store | (South Africa) Wayne Taylor (United States) Morris Shirazi | Spice-Chevrolet SE90P | GTP | 165 | 37th (DNF) | 7th (DNF) |

=== American open wheel racing results ===
(key)

==== American Racing Series / Indy Lights ====
American Racing Series / Indy Lights results
| Year | Team | 1 | 2 | 3 | 4 | 5 | 6 | 7 | 8 | 9 | 10 | 11 | 12 | Rank | Points |
|---|---|---|---|---|---|---|---|---|---|---|---|---|---|---|---|
| 1986 | Ralph Sanchez Racing | PHX1; 5 | **MIL**; 3 | MEA; 10 | TOR; 10 | **POC**; 1 | MOH; 4 | ROA; 2 | LS; 14 | **PHX2**; 4 | MIA; 3 | | | 2nd | 107 |
| 1987 | Arciero Racing | PHX; 1 | MIL; 11 | MEA; 2 | CLE; 4 | TOR; 8 | POC; 2 | MOH; 5 | NAZ; 3 | LS; 7 | MIA; 1 | | | 2nd | 123 |
| 1988 | Hemelgarn Racing | **PHX**; 14 | MIL; 11 | POR; 11 | CLE | TOR | MEA | | | | | | MIA; 17 | 23rd | 5 |
| 1988 | Agapiou Racing | | | | | | | POC; 14 | MOH | ROA | NAZ | LS | | 23rd | 5 |
| 1989 | Baci Racing | PHX | LBH | MIL | DET | POR | MEA | TOR | POC | MOH | ROA | NAZ; 10 | LS | 27th | 3 |
| 1995 | Canaska Racing | MIA; 15 | PHX; DNS | LBH; 20 | NAZ; 10 | MIL; 19 | DET; 12 | POR | TOR; 11 | CLE; 20 | NHA; 7 | VAN | LS | 19th | 12 |

==== CART ====
PPG IndyCar World Series results
| Year | Team | Chassis | Engine | 1 | 2 | 3 | 4 | 5 | 6 | 7 | 8 | 9 | 10 | 11 | 12 | 13 | 14 | 15 | 16 | 17 | Rank | Points | Ref |
|---|---|---|---|---|---|---|---|---|---|---|---|---|---|---|---|---|---|---|---|---|---|---|---|
| 1990 | TEAMKAR International | Lola T89/00 | Cosworth DFS V8t | PHX | LBH | INDY; DNQ | MIL; 17 | DET | POR | CLE | MEA | TOR | MIS | DEN | VAN | MOH | ROA | NAZ | LAG | | 37th | 0 | |
| 1991 | Bayside Disposal Racing | Lola T91/00 | Cosworth DFS V8t | SRF; 7 | LBH; 9 | PHX; 10 | INDY; 15 | MIL; 11 | DET; 16 | POR; 12 | CLE; 16 | MEA; 23 | TOR; 9 | MIS; 12 | DEN; 12 | VAN; 11 | MOH; 22 | ROA; 18 | NAZ; 11 | LAG; 13 | 15th | 26 | |
| 1992 | A. J. Foyt Enterprises | Lola T91/00 | Chevrolet 265A V8t | SRF | PHX | LBH | INDY; 18 | DET | POR | MIL | NHA | TOR | MIC | CLE | ROA | VAN | MOH | NAZ | LAG | | 49th | 0 | |
| 1993 | Pagan Racing | Lola T92/00 | Buick 3300 V6t | SRF | PHX | LBH | INDY; 29 | MIL | DET | POR | CLE | TOR | MIC | NHA | ROA | VAN | MOH | NAZ | LAG | | 53rd | 0 | |
| 1994 | Euromotorsports | Lola T93/00 | Ilmor 265C V8t | SRF | PHX; 17 | LBH | | | | | | | | | | | | | | | 44th | 0 | |
| 1994 | Hemelgarn Racing | Lola T92/00 | Buick 3300 V6t | | | | INDY; DNQ | MIL | DET | POR | CLE | TOR | MIC | MOH | NHA | VAN | ROA | NAZ | LAG | | 44th | 0 | |

==== Indianapolis 500 ====
| Year | Chassis | Engine | Start | Finish |
|---|---|---|---|---|
| 1990 | Lola T89/00 | Cosworth DFS V8t | DNQ | |
| 1991 | Lola T91/00 | Cosworth DFS V8t | 11 | 15 |
| 1992 | Lola T91/00 | Chevrolet 265A V8t | 20 | 18 |
| 1993 | Lola T92/00 | Buick 3300 V6t | 16 | 29 |
| 1994 | Lola T92/00 | Buick 3300 V6t | DNQ | |

=== NASCAR ===
(key) (Bold – Pole position awarded by qualifying time. Italics – Pole position earned by points standings or practice time. * – Most laps led.)

==== Craftsman Truck Series ====
NASCAR Craftsman Truck Series results
| Year | Team | No. | Make | 1 | 2 | 3 | 4 | 5 | 6 | 7 | 8 | 9 | 10 | 11 | 12 | 13 | 14 | 15 | 16 | 17 | 18 | 19 | 20 | 21 | 22 | 23 | 24 | 25 | NCTC | Pts | Ref |
|---|---|---|---|---|---|---|---|---|---|---|---|---|---|---|---|---|---|---|---|---|---|---|---|---|---|---|---|---|---|---|---|
| 1999 | Enerjetix Motorsports | 94 | Chevy | HOM | PHO | EVG | MMR | MAR | MEM | PPR | I70 | BRI | TEX; 31 | PIR | GLN | MLW; 30 | NSV | NZH; 31 | MCH | NHA | IRP | GTY | HPT | RCH | LVS | LVL | TEX | CAL | 64th | 213 | |

=== North American Touring Car Championship ===
(key)

North American Touring Car Championship results
| Year | Team | No. | Car | 1 | 2 | 3 | 4 | 5 | 6 | 7 | 8 | 9 | 10 | 11 | 12 | 13 | 14 | 15 | 16 | NATCC | Pts |
|---|---|---|---|---|---|---|---|---|---|---|---|---|---|---|---|---|---|---|---|---|---|
| 1996 | Leitzinger Racing | 5 | Ford Mondeo | LRP | LRP | DET; 5 | DET; 6 | PIR; 6 | PIR; 6 | TOR; DNS | TOR; DNS | TRV; 9 | TRV; 5 | MOH; 6 | MOH; 10 | VAN; 6 | VAN; 7 | LS; 9 | LS; 5 | 7th | 106 |

Sporting positions
| Preceded by Eddie Cheever | Indianapolis 500 Rookie of the Year; 1991 | Succeeded by Lyn St. James |
| Preceded by Eddie Cheever | CART Rookie of the Year; 1991 | Succeeded by Stefan Johansson |
