= Transsyberia rally =

Race in Siberia for 4WD automobiles and trucks

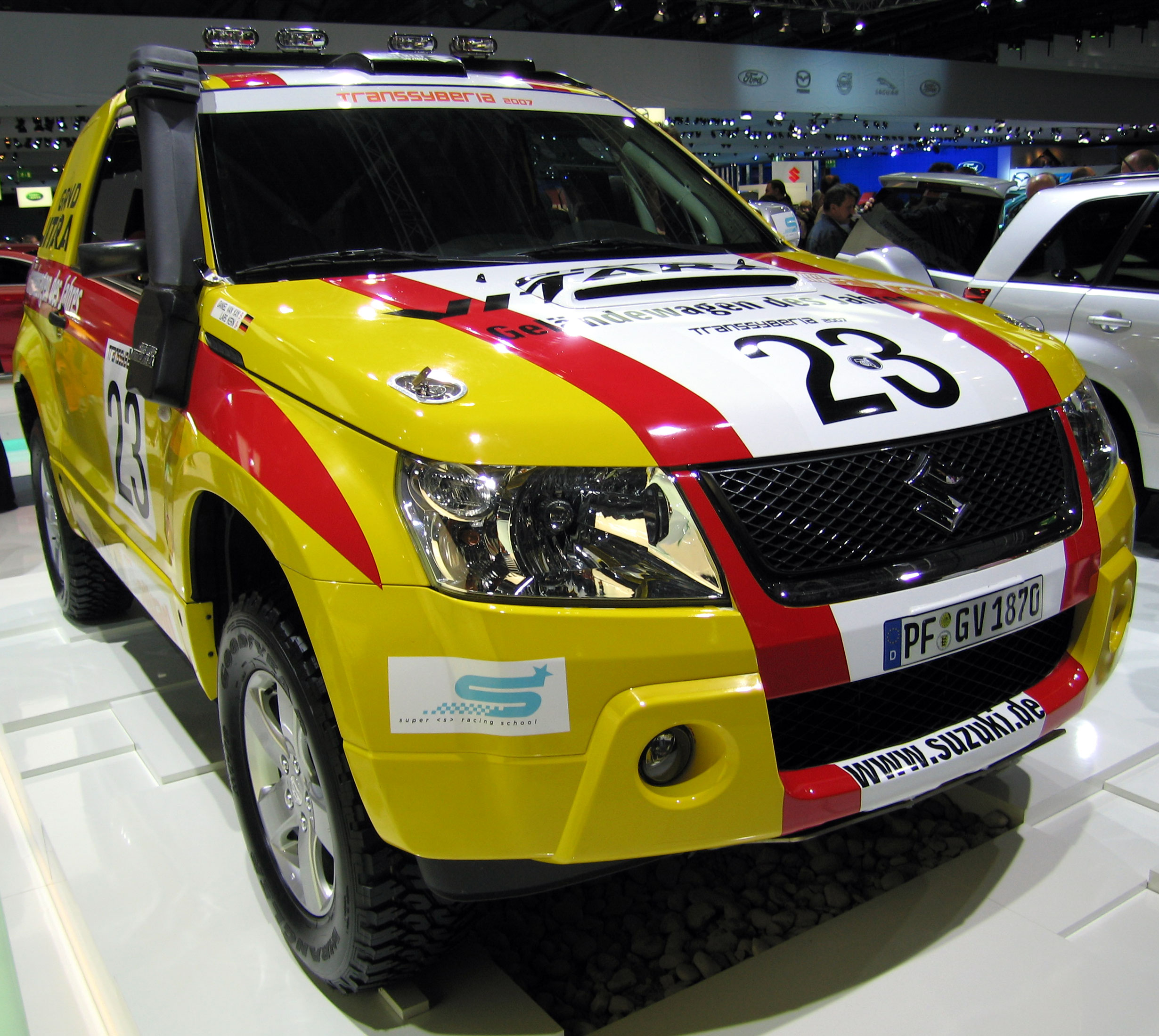
Suzuki Grand Vitara Transsyberia 2007

The TransSyberia Rally was a rally raid race held in Siberia. The rally is open only to 4WD automobiles and trucks. Technical modifications are allowed, but vehicles must be street legal. Most modifications are to improve safety, reliability and ease of maintenance.

== TransSyberia 2007 ==
The 2007 TransSyberia Rally ran from Moscow, Russia to the Mongolian capital of Ulaanbaatar. The 6,600 kilometer route crossed the Ural Mountains, subarctic forests, and the Altai Mountains. The route continued across the Mongolian plains and through the Gobi Desert.

25 of 34 entered teams drove Porsche Cayennes – the Porsche Cayenne S Transsyberia Edition. These vehicles contain numerous modifications to improve the car's stability, handling, and safety, and were built exclusively for the TransSyberia Rallye.

The race was won by Rod Millen.

== Porsche Cayenne S Transsyberia ==
The Porsche Cayenne S Transsyberia power unit is virtually unchanged from the Cayenne S – the output of the Transsyberia edition is 4.8-litre natural aspiration V8 with direct gasoline injection remains 385 bhp (287 kW) at 6200 rpm which is connected to a six-speed Tiptronic S with a 4.11 final drive ratio. The technological enhancements include Porsche Traction Management – which is further improved by a transverse lock from the optional Offroad Technology Package (available to regular customers), Porsche Dynamic Chassis Control – which is preset to a “Special Offroad Mode” which allows the Cayenne to pass through bodies of water up to 30" deep, and Porsche Active Suspension Management.

The remaining modifications are more rally car-specific.

- Reinforced A and B pillars
- Bolted-down safety cage
- Stronger underbody protection with diamond-plate steel flooring
- Handbrake instead of the standard foot-operated parking brake
- Lightweight sport exhaust
- Roof-mounted snorkel
- Off-road tires
- Roof lights
- Front-mounted winch
- Rerouted electrical system
- Passenger-operated navigation system

The interior of the car is stripped down to the essentials to save on weight and make room for the dual spare wheels and tires, and the two reserve fuel tanks which occupy what used to be the rear seats.
