= Rod Millen =

New Zealand rally and racing driver (born 1951)

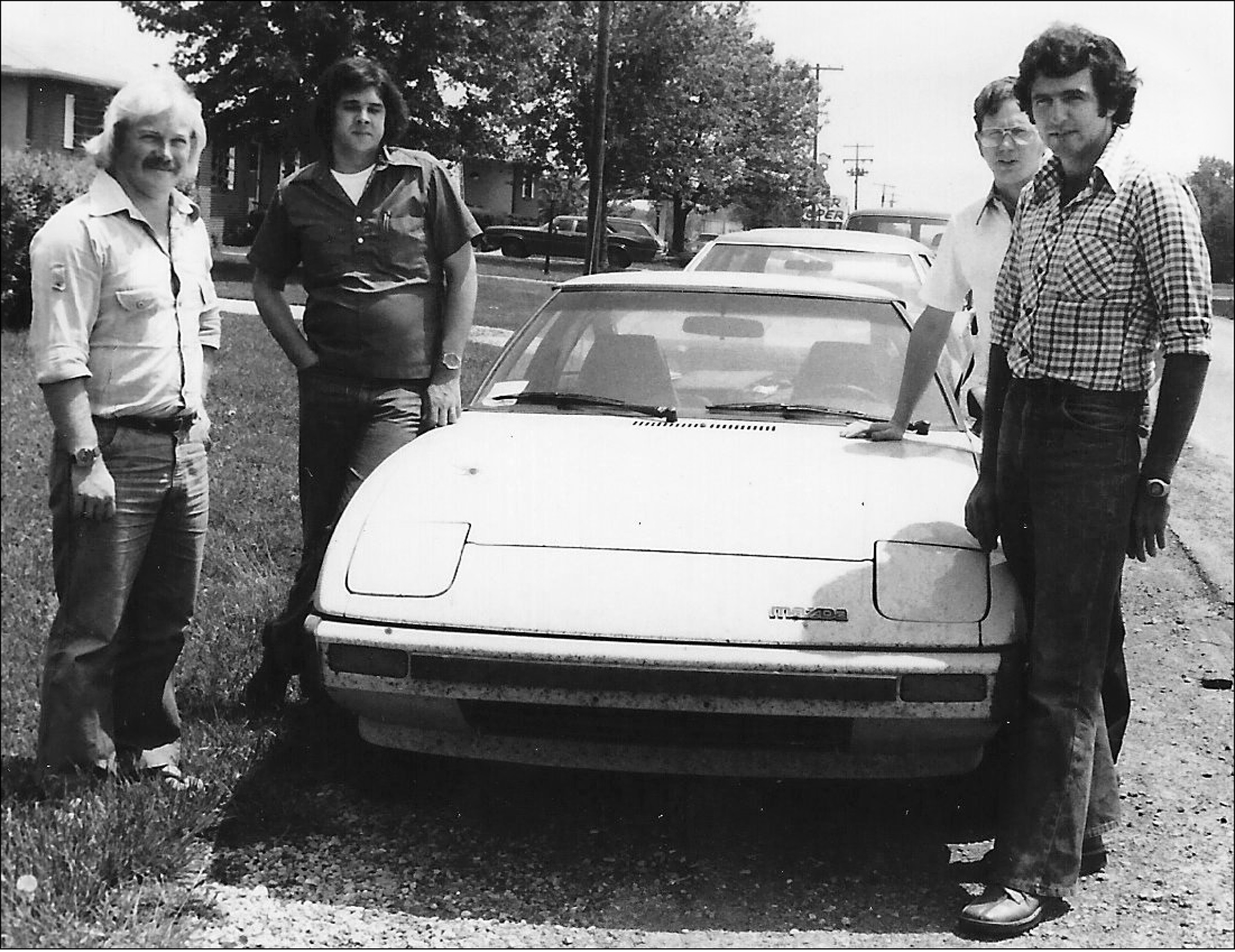
- Rod Millen (far right) in 1978

Personal information
- Nationality: (New Zealand) New Zealander
- Full name: Rodney Kenneth Millen
- Born: 22 March 1951 (age 75); New Zealand

World Rally Championship record
- Years active: 1977, 1979, 1981–1982, 1985–1992
- Co-driver: (New Zealand) Mike Franchi (Canada) John Bellefleur (United Kingdom) Bryan Harris (United Kingdom) Brian Rainbow (United States) Harry Ward (New Zealand) Tony Sircombe
- Teams: Mazda
- Rallies: 19
- Rally wins: 0
- Podiums: 1
- Stage wins: 31
- Total points: 63
- First rally: 1977 South Pacific Rally
- Last rally: 1992 Rally Australia

Rodney Kenneth Millen (born 22 March 1951) is a New Zealand racing driver, vehicle designer, and former owner of MillenWorks. He has competed in numerous genres of motorsports, including rallying, off-road racing, hillclimbing, drifting, and super touring.

== Personal life ==
Rod Millen was born in New Zealand. Millen is the father of Rhys Millen and Ryan Millen, and the brother of Steve Millen. All have raced in various types of motorsports. Both of Rod's sons, Ryan and Rhys have raced with him in the Baja 1000. Early in life, Millen was trained as a surveyor, but he decided to race for a living.

== Racing career ==
=== 1970s ===
Millen began racing in the New Zealand Rally Championship. He was the season champion in 1975, 1976, and 1977 driving Mazda Rx3s. Millen decided to move to the United States in 1978 to do rally races in the United States, again with a Mazda Rotary powered vehicle, the Rx7. He won the North American Race and Rally Championship in 1979.

=== 1980s ===
Millen repeated as the champion of the North American Race and Rally in 1980. In 1981 he won the SCCA PRO Rally, and he won his second series championship in 1985. He won back to back SCCA National Rally Championships in 1987 and 1988.

While winning his third straight SCCA National Rally Championship in 1989, he also won the FIA Asia-Pacific Rally Championship. In 1989, he raced against his brother Steve in IMSA's 24 Hours of Daytona. He won the GTU division of the race with codrivers Al Bacon and Bob Reed. He began competing in major hillclimbing events, and in 1989 he won the Class C division at the Pikes Peak International Hill Climb.

Millen competed in several World Rally Championship events from 1977 to 1992. He was most active from 1989 to 1992, driving a Mazda 323 AWD, codriven by Tony Sircombe. He placed second in the 1989 Rothman's Rally of New Zealand.

=== 1990s ===
In 1990, Millen won the Rim of the World SCCA PRO Rally event, and finished second at the Rally Malaysia and the Rally Indonesia. He returned to the Pikes Peak Hill Climb, winning in the Open Class in 1991 and Showroom Class in 1992. He moved to the open rally division in 1993, finishing second.

Millen began competing in the Mickey Thompson Stadium Series, an indoor stadium off-road racing series in 1991. He won two events in 1992. He won the series championship in the Grand National Sport Truck series in 1992, 1993, and 1994. In the 12-year history of the series, he was the only driver to win the series championship in three consecutive years. In his career, he had 12 victories in the series before it closed down. His success earned him a spot on the American Auto Racing Writers and Broadcasters Association (AARWBA) All-American First Team in 1992 and 1994.

Millen captured the record for the fastest ascent of the 156 turn, 12.42 mile (19.99 kilometer) Pikes Peak International Hill Climb. He broke the old record time by 40 seconds when he ascended the hill in 10:04:06 in 1994 in his all wheel drive Toyota Celica. His record was broken on 21 July 2007 by Nobuhiro Tajima driving the Suzuki XL7 Hill Climb Special to a time of 10:01.408. However, Tajima's record was set after the Pikes Peak surface was partially paved whereas Millen's record was on dirt. Millen had the fastest overall time at the famous mountain four more times (1996, 1997, 1998, and 1999), but was unable to beat his goal of completing the climb in less than ten minutes. Millen and his wife became the first husband-wife team to contest the hill. He also became the father-son (with Rhys) to win overall titles on the hill.

Millen competed in the South Africa Stadium series in 1997, winning the championship. Millen returned to his native country New Zealand to compete in the first annual Race to the Sky hillclimb in 1998 near Queenstown. He finished second overall in both 1998 and 1999.

=== 2000s ===
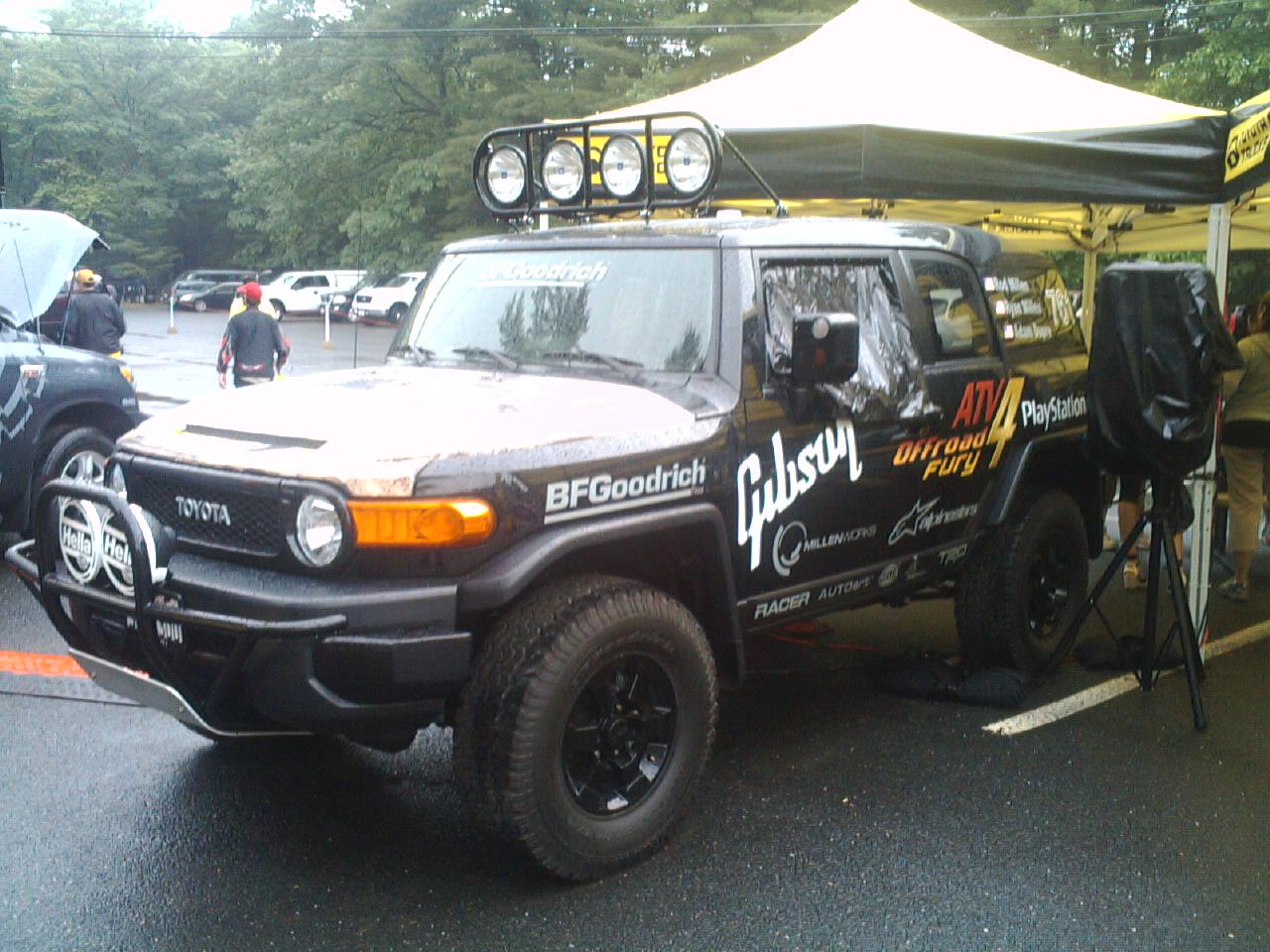
2006 Baja 1000 MillenWorks vehicle

Millen began competing in the Pro-4 division in the Championship Off-Road Racing Series starting with selected events in 1999. Millen's first win in his Pro4 short course truck in 2000 was at the spring Crandon race. He finished second in the season points standings in 2000 after winning at Luxemburg, Wisconsin, Fort Dodge, Iowa, Bark River, Michigan, and Topeka, Kansas. He finished second at the BorgWarner World Championship Off-Road race at Crandon that year.

Millen competed in several additional genres of motorsport in 2000. He represented U.S. at the International Race of Champions at the Canary Islands. He finished third at the Baja 2000 off-road desert race in his Trophy Truck. The Baja 1000 was extended to 2000 miles that year. Millen won the SCCA Button Hollow 3 Hour enduro road race.

Millen raced in the Goldrush International Hillclimb in New Zealand in 2000, finishing second. Millen returned to the Race to the Sky hillclimb in 2001, and won the Unlimited Class. In 2002 he had his second consecutive win in the Unlimited Class and his first overall, he finished second in 2003 and 2004. That same year, he also particioated in the Goodwood Festival of Speed with a Toyota Celica Pikes Peak, setting the fastest time in the shootout. Millen has driven an RX-8 in the Formula D drifting series. He attempted to qualify for his first drifting event in 2005 but did not make the field. He competed at several events in 2006.

Millen has competed in numerous Baja 1000 off-road racing events, most recently finishing second in class in 2006. The team, with his son Ryan Millen as one of the drivers, finished the 34-hour trek through the desert 33 seconds behind the winner in what is considered a photo finish.

Millen won the Transsyberia rally 2007. With co-driver Richard Kelsey, they competed the 7,100 kilometers from Moscow, Russia to Ulaanbaatar, Mongolia, the fastest of the 26 teams, driving one of 26 Porsche Cayenne S Transsyberia rally cars.

== Awards and honors ==
- Pikes Peak Hill Climb Museum Hall of Fame (2016)

== MillenWorks ==
Millen started Rod Millen Motorsports, later renamed MillenWorks, which began by preparing and later building Millen's race cars. The company now develops vehicles, high performance parts, and technology for racing, concept cars, and the military.

== Racing record ==
=== Complete WRC results ===
Year	Entrant	Car	1	2	3	4	5	6	7	8	9	10	11	12	13	14	WDC	Pts
1977	Rod Millen	Mazda RX-3	MON	SWE	POR	KEN	NZL; 5	GRC	FIN	CAN	ITA	FRA	GBR; 21				N/A	N/A
1979	Rod Millen	Datsun 510	MON	SWE	POR	KEN	GRE	NZL	FIN	CAN; Ret	ITA	FRA	GBR	CIV			NC	0
1981	TWR Mazda Motorsport	Mazda RX-7	MON	SWE	POR	KEN	FRA	GRC	ARG	BRA	FIN	ITA	CIV	GBR; 11			NC	0
1982	Mazda Dealers New Zealand	Mazda RX-7	MON	SWE	POR	KEN	FRA	GRC	NZL; 5	BRA	FIN	ITA	CIV				26th	8
1982	TWR Mazda Motorsport	Mazda RX-7												GBR; Ret			26th	8
1985	Mazda Rally Team Europe	Mazda RX-7	MON	SWE	POR	KEN	FRA	GRC	NZL	ARG	FIN	ITA	CIV	GBR; 9			60th	2
1986	CRC Mazda Dealer Team	Mazda 323 4WD	MON	SWE	POR	KEN	FRA	GRE	NZL; 10	ARG	FIN	CIV	ITA	GBR			44th	5
1986	Mazda North America	Mazda 323 4WD													USA; 7		44th	5
1987	Mazda North America	Mazda 323 4WD	MON	SWE	POR	KEN	FRA	GRE	USA; 4	NZL	ARG	FIN	CIV	ITA	GBR		26th	10
1988	Mazda North America	Mazda 323 4WD	MON	SWE	POR	KEN	FRA	GRC	USA; 8	NZL	ARG	FIN	CIV	ITA	GBR		59th	3
1989	Rod Millen Motorsport	Mazda 323 4WD	SWE	MON	POR	KEN	FRA	GRC	NZL; 2	ARG	FIN	AUS; 5	ITA	CIV	GBR		11th	23
1990	Mazda Rally Team Asia Pacific	Mazda 323 4WD	MON	POR	KEN	FRA	GRC	NZL; Ret	ARG	FIN	AUS; Ret	ITA	CIV	GBR			NC	0
1991	Mazda Rally Team Asia Pacific	Mazda 323 4WD	MON	SWE	POR	KEN	FRA	GRC	NZL; 6	ARG	FIN	AUS; 6	ITA	CIV	ESP	GBR	19th	12
1992	Mazda Rally Team Asia Pacific	Mazda 323 4WD	MON	SWE	POR	KEN	FRA	GRC	NZL; Ret	ARG	FIN	AUS; Ret	ITA	CIV	ESP	GBR	NC	0

=== North American Touring Car Championship results ===
Year	Team	Car	1	2	3	4	5	6	7	8	9	10	11	12	13	14	15	16	17	18	NATCC	Pts
1996	Rod Millen Motorsports	Toyota Camry	LRP; 8	LRP; 5	DET; 8	DET; 5	PIR	PIR	TOR; 4	TOR; 6	TRV	TRV	MOH	MOH	VAN	VAN	LS; 4	LS; 10			10th	63
1997	Rod Millen Motorsports	Toyota Camry	LBH	LBH	SAV	SAV	DET	DET	PIR; 8	PIR; 2	CLE	CLE	TOR	TOR	MOH	MOH	VAN	VAN	LS	LS	12th	26

Sporting positions
Preceded by Kenjiro Shinozuka	Asia-Pacific Rally Champion; 1989	Succeeded by Carlos Sainz
