= EuroSwift SC92 =

- Category: Formula Ford 1600 (F1600)

Technical specifications
- Chassis: Steel tubular spaceframe, glass/kevlar-reinforced polyester bodywork
- Suspension: Double wishbones, push-rod/pull-rod actuated coil springs over shock absorbers, anti-roll bars (front & rear)
- Width: ~ 1,850 mm (73 in)
- Axle track: ~ 1,200 mm (47 in)
- Wheelbase: ~ 2,000 mm (79 in)
- Engine: Mid-engine, longitudinally mounted, 1.6 L (97.6 cu in), Ford Pinto/Ford Kent, SOHC I4, N/A
- Transmission: Hewland LD200 4-speed manual
- Power: 120 hp (89 kW)
- Weight: 970–1,125 lb (440–510 kg)
- Tires: Goodyear

Competition history

The EuroSwift SC92 is an open-wheel formula race car, designed, developed and built to Formula Ford 1600 specifications, in 1992.
