= Randy Pobst =

American racing driver

- Nationality: United States of America
- Born: June 26, 1957 (age 69) Dayton, Ohio, U.S.
- Debut season: 1977

Randy Franklin Pobst (born June 26, 1957, in Dayton, Ohio), also known as "RFP" or "the Rocket," is an American race car driver and journalist for Grassroots Motorsports magazine.

Active in the SCCA World Challenge GT series and the Grand American series' GT class, Pobst was the 2003, 2007, 2008, and 2010 SCCA World Challenge GT champion, the 1996 North American Touring Car Championship title winner, and the 2005, 2006 and 2007 SCCA World Challenge TC vice-champion. He is also a two-time class winner of the 24 Hours of Daytona, in 2001 and 2006.

Pobst has more than 90 pro wins.

== 2004-2007 ==
From 2005 to 2007, Pobst drove for Mazda with Tri-Point Racing in a Mazda 6 in the SCCA World Challenge Touring Car series, finishing second in 2005, 2006, and 2007. In 2007 and 2008, he won the SCCA World Challenge GT Championship with K-Pax/3R Racing in a Porsche 911 GT3 Cup Car. He repeated the feat in 2010 in a K-Pax Racing Volvo S60.

== 2008 ==
In 2008, Pobst raced in a Volkswagen GTI for APR Motorsport in the KONI Challenge Series and for Stevenson Motorsport at the 24 Hours of Daytona in a Pontiac GXP.

== 2009 ==
Pobst returned to K-Pax/3R Racing to defend his two Speed World Challenge GT Class championships, but in a Volvo Touring Car instead of a Porsche GT3 (K-Pax/3R switched to Volvo for this season). Additionally, he raced for Gotham Racing at the 2009 24 Hours of Daytona in a Porsche GT.

== 2010 ==
World Challenge GT Champion

== 2014 ==
Pobst drove on the track for Motor Trend magazine.

== 2015 ==
Pobst drove for PPR in a 700 hp Nissan GT-R in preparation for the 2016 Pikes Peak race in Colorado.

Pobst hosted a show called The Racing Line on the MotorTrend YouTube channel, where he teaches about the basics of being a racing driver.

In December, Pobst was inducted into the SCCA Hall of Fame.

== 2017 ==
Pobst drove with Thing 3 Racing for the 7hr Enduro at Road Atlanta with World Racing League. The team took home the "GTO" class win on Friday when the sun set.

On September 23, 2017, Pobst drove with KSR (Kevin Smith Racing)/Flatout Racing in the ChumpCar World Series endurance racing series event The Sebring 14. The team won the 14 hour race with Randy scoring the fastest lap of the race with a 2:33.427 in a 1995 Lexus SC300.

== 2018 ==
Pobst drove the Team Fieroline 1986 Pontiac Fiero at Thunderhill Raceway Park in December for the Lucky Dog Racing League "Top Dawg Nationals" Championship, posting a fast lap of 3:26.213. The car, which was also piloted by Damian Donesky and Kevin Ford, ended up third in the LDRL B class in the 14 hour Parc Ferme Championship race and 12th overall out of 76 competitors.

== 2019 ==
Pobst drove the Team Fieroline car again at with Lucky Dog Racing League at Portland International Raceway, posting a fast lap of 1:33.458.

== 2020 ==
In late August 2020, Pobst represented Unplugged Performance in the Pikes Peak Climb, racing a customized Tesla Model 3 Performance version. The car was wrecked in one of the trial runs in the upper section of the course. According to Pobst, after decelerating from 112 MPH to 68 MPH at Bottomless Pit, a section with frost heave road damage, the car went off the road and hit a wall at 40 MPH. The heavily-damaged car, along with a donor parts car, were taken to a body shop in Colorado Springs, Eurocars, for a rebuild, after which it qualified for the Sunday race and came in second.

== 2021 ==
Finished second at the 2nd annual Freedom 500 April 2, 2021 hosted by Cleetus McFarland on the Freedom Factory. Pobst won the Exhibition Class at Pikes Peak International Hill Climb driving the newly-released Tesla Model S Plaid, prepared by Unplugged Performance.

== 2023 ==
While competing for Unplugged Performance at the Pikes Peak International Hill Climb, Pobst achieved a record-breaking time of 9:54.901. Setting a new record for the fastest EV based on production models, as well as the fastest modified production-based EV. Pobst's performance was achieved with the substantially modified Model S Plaid.

They placed second in class, and top-ten overall among 66 competitors.

== SportsCar Magazine ==
For many years, Randy has written a column titled "Pobst Position" in SCCA's monthly automobile publication, "SportsCar Magazine," to present his thoughts and opinions on professional and amateur racing with topics ranging from his personal career challenges to proper competitor behavior at the wheel of a race car.

== Personal life ==
Pobst is a vegetarian and a motorcycle enthusiast with a collection of vintage Japanese and cafe racer-style bikes. He lives in Atlanta.

Pobst was married to Linda Pobst, with whom he drove his first wheel-to-wheel race in 1985.

== Motorsports career results ==
=== SCCA National Championship Runoffs ===
| Year | Track | Car | Engine | Class | Finish | Start | Status |
|---|---|---|---|---|---|---|---|
| 1991 | Road Atlanta | Honda Civic Si | Honda | Showroom Stock C | 2 | 1 | Running |
| 1992 | Road Atlanta | Mazda Miata | Mazda | Showroom Stock C | 1 | 1 | Running |
| 1993 | Road Atlanta | Mazda Miata | Mazda | Showroom Stock C | | 2 | Disqualified |
| 1994 | Road Atlanta | Mazda Miata | Mazda | Showroom Stock C | 2 | 2 | Running |
| 1995 | Road Atlanta | Mazda Miata | Mazda | Showroom Stock B | 2 | 6 | Running |
| 1995 | Road Atlanta | BMW M3 | BMW | Showroom Stock A | 1 | 1 | Running |

=== North American Touring Car Championship ===
(key)

North American Touring Car Championship results
| Season | Team | No. | Car | 1 | 2 | 3 | 4 | 5 | 6 | 7 | 8 | 9 | 10 | 11 | 12 | 13 | 14 | 15 | 16 | 17 | 18 | NATCC | Pts |
|---|---|---|---|---|---|---|---|---|---|---|---|---|---|---|---|---|---|---|---|---|---|---|---|
| 1996 | TC Kline Racing | 12 | Honda Accord | LRP; 2 | LRP; 3 | DET; 6 | DET; 2 | PIR; 1^{*} | PIR; 1^{*} | TOR; 1 | TOR; 2 | TRV; 3 | TRV; 1 | MOH; 10 | MOH; 3 | VAN; 2 | VAN; 4 | LS; 1 | LS; 2 | | | 1st | 282 |
| 1997 | TC Kline Racing | 1 | BMW 320i | LBH; 3 | LBH; 2 | SAV; 6 | SAV; 9 | DET; 9 | DET; 9 | PIR; 3 | PIR; 6 | CLE; 2 | CLE; 4 | TOR; 7 | TOR; 7 | MOH; 8 | MOH; 9 | VAN; 6 | VAN; 2 | LS; 5 | LS; 4 | 5th | 188 |

=== Complete IMSA SportsCar Championship results ===
(key) (Races in bold indicate pole position) (Races in italics indicate fastest lap)

| Year | Team | Class | Car | Engine | 1 | 2 | 3 | 4 | 5 | 6 | 7 | 8 | 9 | 10 | 11 | Pos. | Points |
|---|---|---|---|---|---|---|---|---|---|---|---|---|---|---|---|---|---|
| 2014 | Mühlner Motorsports America | GTD | Porsche 911 GT America | Porsche 4.0 L Flat-6 | DAY; 20 | SEB | LGA | DET | WGL | MOS | IND; 17 | ELK | VIR | COA | COA | 101st | 15 |

Sporting positions
| Preceded by Inaugural | North American Touring Car Championship Champion; 1996 | Succeeded by David Donohue |
