= Hartong Motorsports =

Touring car racing team

Hartong Motorsports was a touring car racing team that competed in the 1996 and 1997 North American Touring Car Championship. The team was owned by Bill Hartong, a long-time motorsport enthusiast, who spent many years racing Porsche 356's and Porsche 911's in Sportscar Vintage Racing Association (SVRA), Sports Car Club of America (SCCA), Historic Sportscar Racing HSR, and International Motor Sports Association (IMSA) events in the United States. This was a privateer team in a series that was dominated by manufacturer backed Honda and Dodge teams. The BMW 318i was driven by Darren Law.

The team's primary engineer during the inaugural season was James Cox, of Cox Motorsports, with Hayden Burvill taking over in 1997.

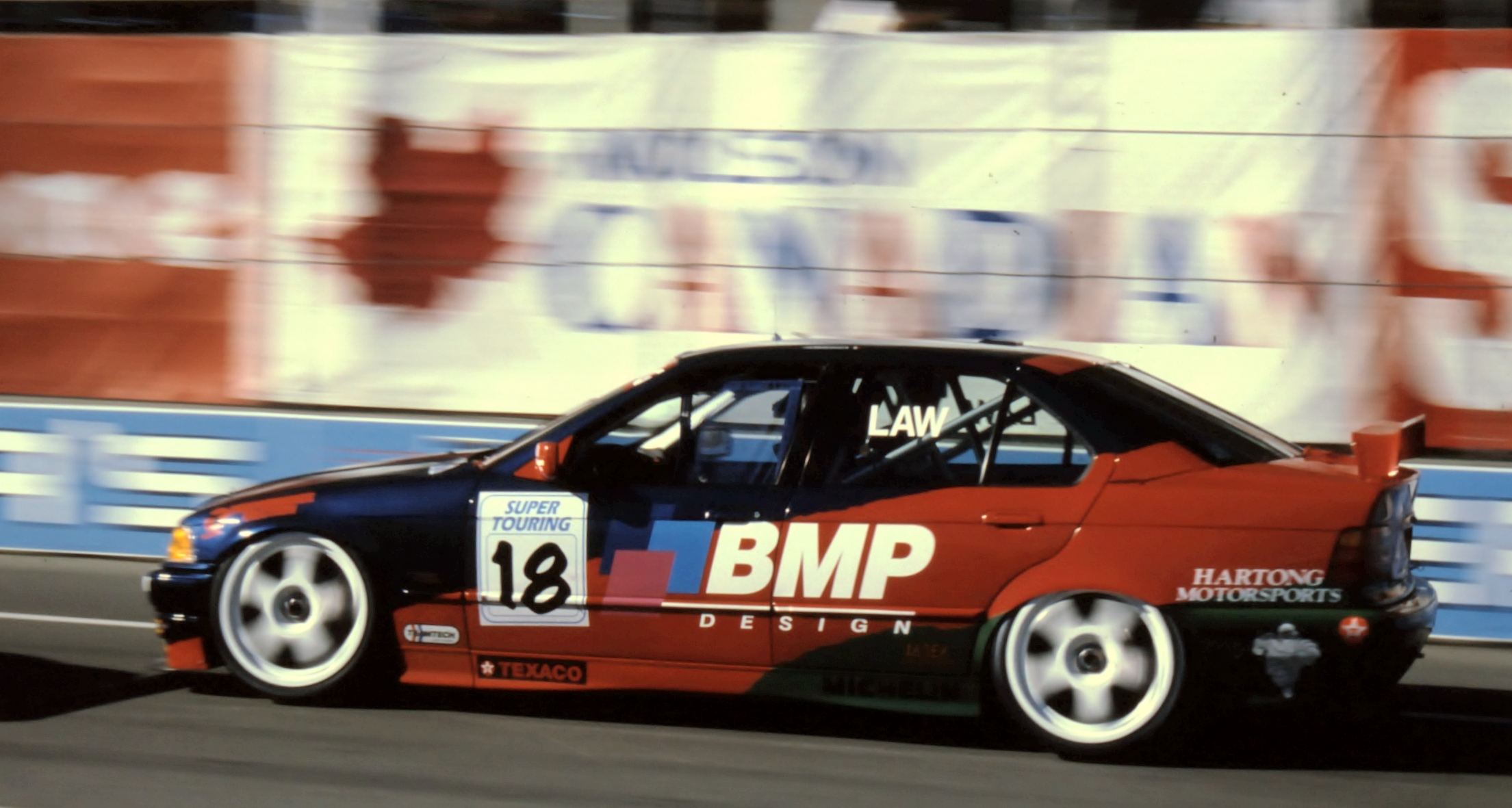
Hartong Motorsports BMW 318i
