= RealTime Racing =

American professional motorsports team

RealTime Racing is an American professional motorsports team founded in 1987 by Peter Cunningham and headquartered in Saukville, just north of Milwaukee, Wisconsin. On gravel roads, frozen lakes, permanent road courses, or temporary street circuits, RealTime drivers have piloted Acura and Honda production-based automobiles to 18 professional titles in a variety of motorsports series.

== International Ice Racing Association (1987–1990) ==
The team campaigned a variety of Honda Civic automobiles in the International Ice Racing Association, leading to IIRA titles for Cunningham in 1987, 1989 and 1990.

== SCCA Pro Rally (1992–1993) ==
RTR focused its energies on SCCA PRO Rally in 1992 and 1993. Fielding an Acura Integra GS-R, Cunningham won the Production Category National Championship and the prestigious Woodner Cup in 1993.

== SCCA World Challenge (1993–present) ==
At the close of the 2012 season, RealTime Racing has earned a record 85 race victories on 27 different tracks in World Challenge competition. Those victories are shared over three categories (GT, GTS and Touring Car) and 11 different drivers.

RTR first entered the SCCA Pro Racing sanctioned World Challenge Championships in 1993 with a Honda Prelude Si in the Touring Car Category (at the time known as Class C, then renamed Super Production in 1994 and Touring 2 in 1996, finally becoming Touring Car in 1999). The team finished second in the Drivers’ Championship in 1993 and 1994 with Cunningham, before winning back-to-back championships in 1995 and 1996 with Cunningham and Michael Galati, respectively. The team's success propelled Honda to four-straight Manufacturers’ Championships from 1993 – 1996.

In 1997, the team's World Challenge Touring Car program transitioned to the Acura Integra Type R. RealTime drivers won championships with this model in 1997 (Pierre Kleinubing), 1998 (Galati), 2000 (Kleinubing), 2001 (Kleinubing) and 2002 (Cunningham). The strength of RealTime's Integra program gave Acura its first four World Challenge Manufacturers’ Championships: 1998, 1999, 2000 and 2002.

The Integra Type R would go down as the most successful car model in the history of the World Challenge Touring Car category, scoring more wins, poles and championships than any other model before or since. A winning example of RealTime's Integra Type R resides in the Honda museum.

In the midst of the Acura Integra Type R's success, RTR added a World Challenge GT (then called Touring 1) program to its stable, campaigning a normally-aspirated Acura NSX. The car won eight races between the 1996 – 1998 World Challenge seasons and Cunningham won the GT Drivers’ Championship in 1997 with the car.

In 2000, to complement Cunningham's efforts with the BMW factory team in the American Le Mans Series, RTR expanded its World Challenge lineup to include a BMW M3 in the GT Championship. In its first BMW venture, the team scored five front-row starting positions and four podium finishes, including a race win at St. Croix, all with Cunningham at the wheel.

The team upgraded the Acura NSX to a supercharged model for the World Challenge GT category from 2001 – 2002. The team earned six wins with this car and finished second in the 2001 and 2002 Drivers’ Championships with Cunningham. The RealTime Acura NSX is also on display in the Honda Museum.

In 2003, RealTime began its campaign of the Acura RSX in Touring Car. The team won three races with the RSX in the model's debut season and finished second in the Drivers’ Championship with Kleinubing. The race debut of the Acura TSX came in 2004, but as the team worked to develop the TSX, the RSX continued to play a significant role in the World Challenge Touring Car Championship through 2008.

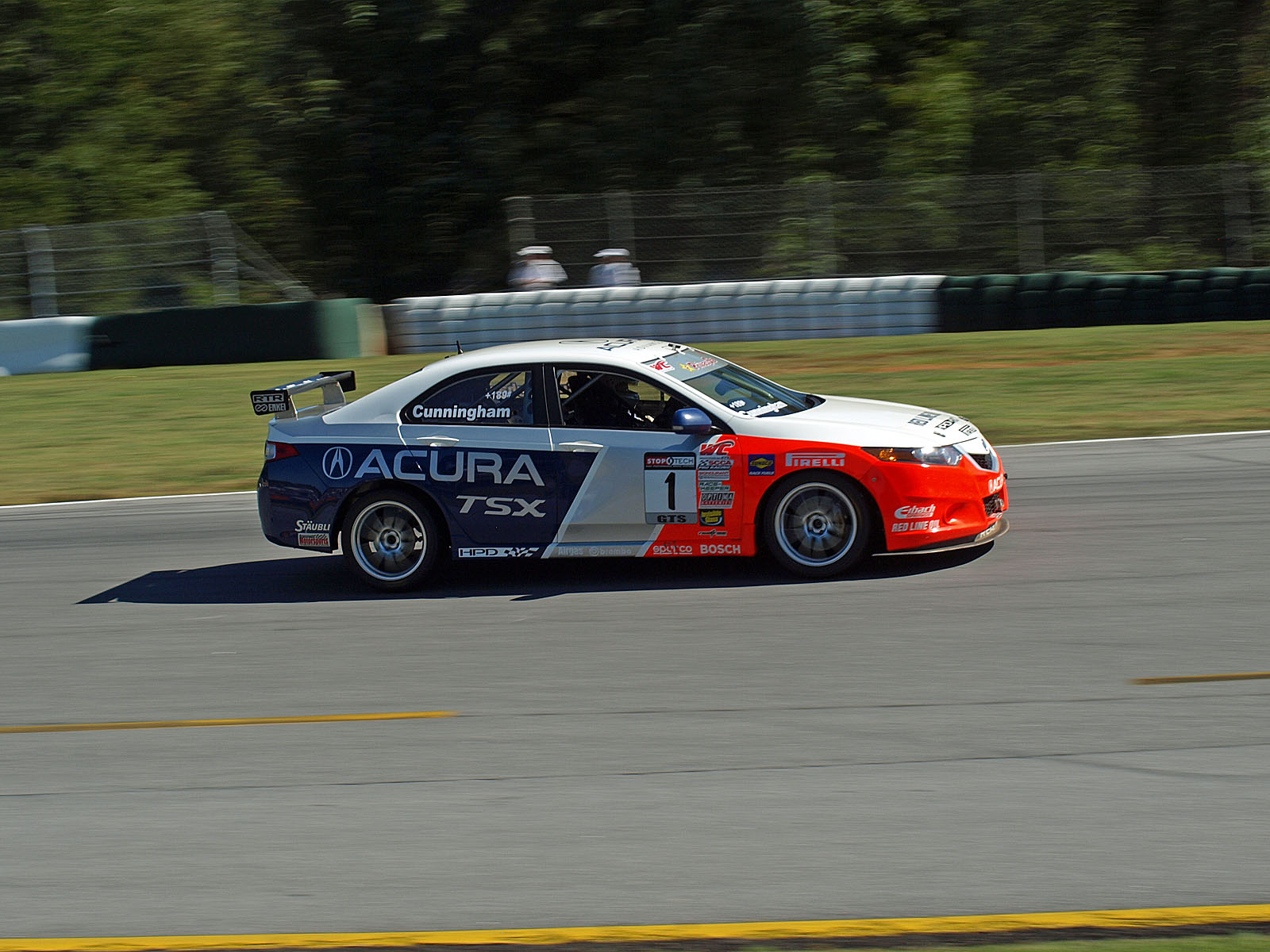
Peter Cunningham's Acura TSX at Road Atlanta.

The first generation TSX would go on to score championships for Cunningham in 2005 and 2008, and for Kleinubing in 2006. The second generation TSX made its debut in 2009 and netted another Drivers’ Championship for Kleinubing. The TSX maintained Acura and RealTime's legacy of success in World Challenge, scoring Manufacturers’ Championships in 2005, 2006, 2008 and 2009.

RTR moved to the new GTS category in 2010 with Cunningham and Nick Esayian each taking home race victories that year. The team briefly and successfully added a Honda Civic Si to their stable at the Grand Prix of Toronto where driver Nick Wittmer won the Touring Car race. RealTime took home both the Drivers’ Championship and the Manufacturers’ Championship for Acura in 2010, but as the competition intensified and the category grew, the decision was made to upgrade the TSX to a V6 platform in 2012. The V6-powered TSX steered the team to another Drivers’ Championship for Cunningham and Acura's record-extending 10th Manufacturers’ Championship.

In 2014, RealTime switched to the new Acura TLX, entering a factory-backed car in the GT class at the Mid-Ohio and Sonoma rounds, with Peter Cunningham claiming a best result of 13th. In 2015 the team fielded two full-time entries for Cunningham and Ryan Eversley. The latter won the first St. Petersburg race and finished sixth in the GT class drivers classification, whereas Cunningham ended 14th. Eversley continued as full-time driver in 2016, winning the two Road America races. Cunningham raced the first half of the season, claiming a runner-up finish at Road America race 1, then Spencer Pumpelly took his place for the last three rounds.

The TLX GT3 will be replaced by the Acura NSX GT3 in 2017, whereas Eversley's teammate will be Peter Kox.
