= Darren Law =

American racing driver

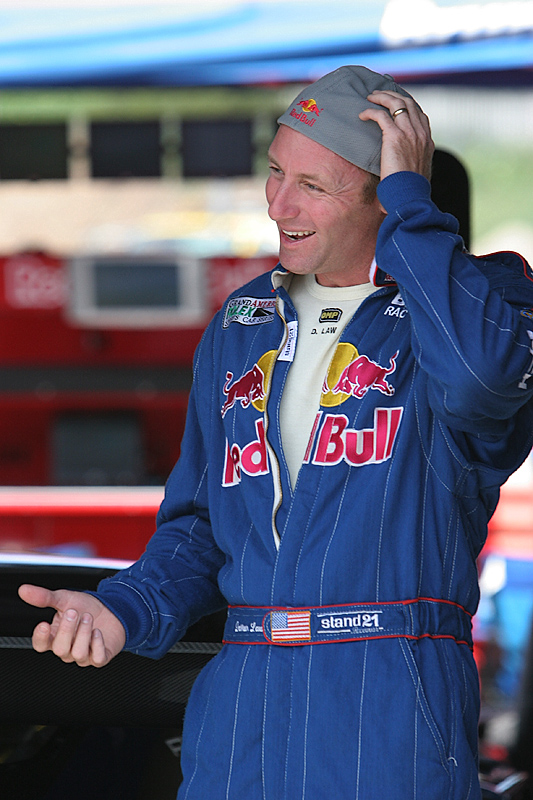
- Law at the Laguna Seca Grand-Am race in 2005
- Nationality: (United States) American
- Born: Darren Peter Law; April 4, 1968 (age 58) Toronto, Ontario, Canada
- Categorisation: FIA Gold (until 2018); FIA Silver (2019–2023); FIA Bronze (2024–)

24 Hours of Le Mans career
- Years: 2009 – 2012
- Teams: Flying Lizard Motorsports
- Best finish: DNF
- Class wins: 0

Darren Peter Law (born April 4, 1968) is an American racing driver.

Law started racing at the age of ten in go-karts in 1978. At the age of 14, Law was the International Kart Federation national champion, and shortly thereafter began racing cars in various amateur classes on the west coast of the United States. In 1991, he spent a season in England and was a factory driver for Elden Racing Cars' factory team in Formula Renault competition. In 1996 and 1997, he competed in the North American Touring Car Championship for the privateer Hartong Motorsports BMW outfit and won the Detroit Grand Prix, finished eighth in points in the series' two years of operation. In 1998, he made his Sports car racing debut in a Porsche GT2 for G&W Motorsports. In 1999, he made a NASCAR Craftsman Truck Series start at Heartland Park Topeka, and competed in three events that year.

Law joined the Grand American Road Racing Association's Rolex Sports Car Series in 2000 and finished second in GTU class points. The following year he was the GT class champion. In 2002, he moved from production cars to prototypes and raced in the Rolex Series' SRPII class and was second in points. In 2003, he finished fourth in the new Daytona Prototype class, the series top category.

In 2004, Law competed in both the Daytona Prototypes where he finished 14th and the American Le Mans Series GT2 class where he finished runner up in the GT2 class driver's championship. 2005 saw Law continue to split his time between DP, where he finished 12th for the Brumos Porsche team, and ALMS GT2 where he finished 13th in points for Flying Lizard Motorsports and Alex Job Racing. He continued with the same teams and series in 2006 and finished 14th in Grand Am DP and tenth in ALMS GT2. Driving for the same teams again in 2007, he improved to sixth in points in both series. In 2008, still with the same teams, he improved to fourth in the Daytona Prototype championship but dropped back to seventh in ALMS GT2.

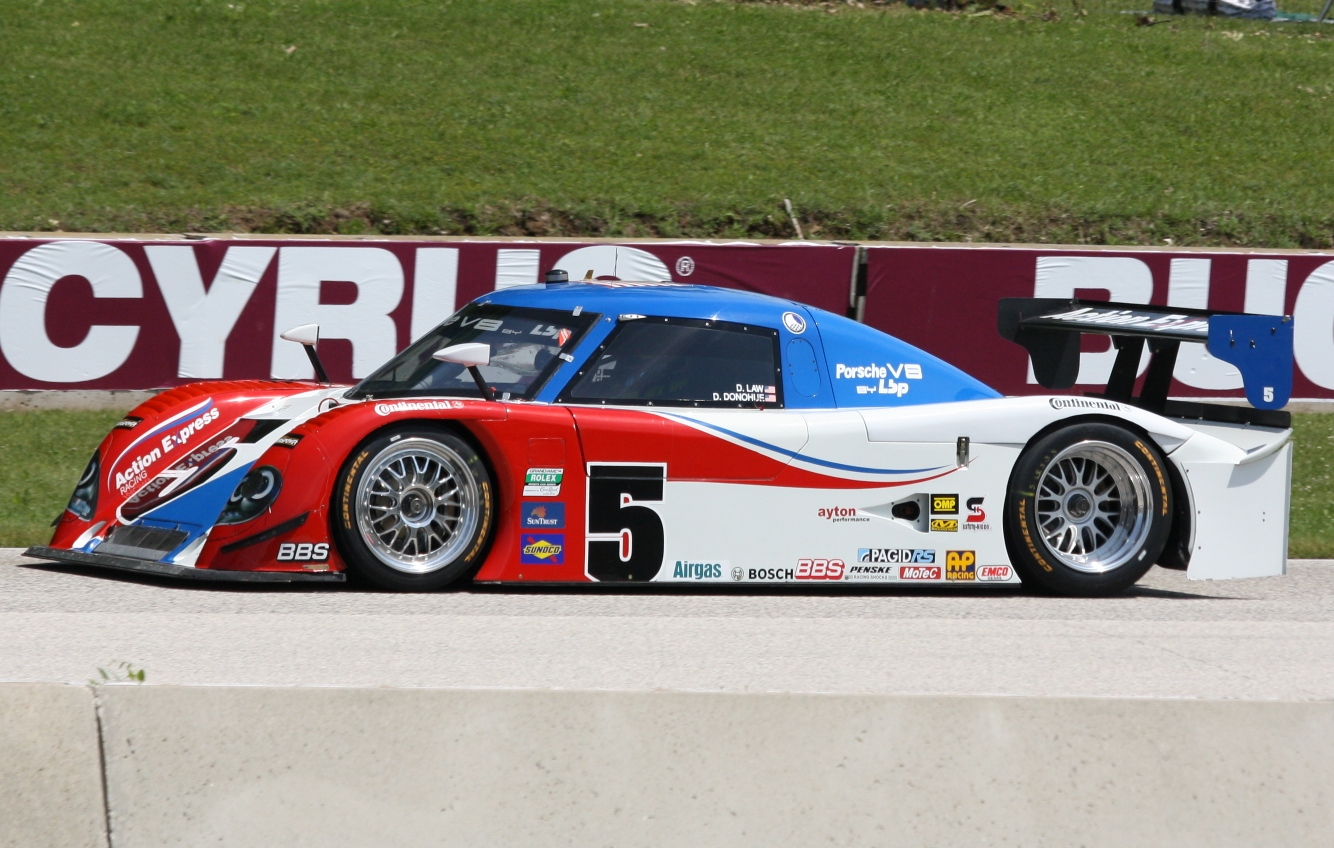
Law's 2011 Rolex Sports Car

Law was a part of the 2009 24 Hours of Daytona-winning crew driving a Brumos Racing-run Riley-Porsche, along with David Donohue, Antonio García and Buddy Rice.

Law currently resides in Phoenix, Arizona.

== Motorsports results ==
=== American Open-Wheel racing results ===
(key) (Races in bold indicate pole position, races in italics indicate fastest race lap)

==== USAC FF2000 Championship results ====
Year	Entrant	1	2	3	4	5	6	7	8	9	Pos	Points
1990		WSR1	MMR	WSR2	CAJ	WSR3	SON1	FIR; 6	SON2	PIR; 16	???	???

=== 24 Hours of Le Mans results ===
Year	Team	Co-Drivers	Car	Class	Laps	Pos.	Class Pos.
2009	(United States) Flying Lizard Motorsports	(United States) Seth Neiman (Germany) Jörg Bergmeister	Porsche 997 GT3-RSR	GT2	194	DNF	DNF
2010	(United States) Flying Lizard Motorsports	(United States) Seth Neiman (Germany) Jörg Bergmeister	Porsche 997 GT3-RSR	GT2	61	DNF	DNF
2011	(United States) Flying Lizard Motorsports	(United States) Seth Neiman (United States) Spencer Pumpelly	Porsche 997 GT3-RSR	GTE; Am	211	DNF	DNF
2012	(United States) Flying Lizard Motorsports	(United States) Seth Neiman (United States) Spencer Pumpelly	Porsche 997 GT3-RSR	GTE; Am	313	27th	4th

=== WeatherTech SportsCar Championship results ===
(key)(Races in bold indicate pole position, Results are overall/class)

Year	Team	Class	Make	Engine	1	2	3	4	5	6	7	8	9	10	11	Rank	Points	Ref
2014	GAINSCO/Bob Stallings Racing	P	Riley Corvette DP	Chevrolet 5.5L V8	DAY; 18	SEB	LBH	LAG	DET	WGL	MOS	IMS	ROA	COA	PET	59th	1	
