= North American Touring Car Championship =

- Category: Super Touring
- Country: United States; Canada
- Inaugural season: 1996
- Folded: 1997
- Last Drivers' champion: (United States) David Donohue
- Last Makes' champion: (Japan) Honda

The North American Touring Car Championship was a touring car racing series using the Supertouring formula that raced in North America in 1996 and 1997. The series was funded in part by IndyCar team owner Gerald Forsythe with input from British series supremo Alan Gow. He appointed his vice-president of Business Operations, British/Canadian Roger Elliott to run the operation headquartered in Tampa, Florida. The Dodge Stratus factory team engineered and crewed by PacWest Racing and NeuspeedHonda Accord team operated by TC Kline Racing dominated the series as they were one of the only truly professional outfits to contest the championship. HART (Honda America Race Team), ran 2 Accords one US spec and European spec. The series ran as a support series to CART road and street course races.

While popular with fans, the series struggled to attract teams, with most races in the 1996 season only having 11 or 12 entrants. 1997 saw even fewer entrants with only 9 or 10 cars on track for most of the races. The series was not continued for 1998.

== Champions ==
| Season | Drivers' Champion | Manufacturers' Champion | Ref |
|---|---|---|---|
| 1996 | (United States) Randy Pobst (Honda Accord) | (Japan) Honda | |
| 1997 | (United States) David Donohue (Dodge Stratus) | (Japan) Honda | |

== Notable drivers ==
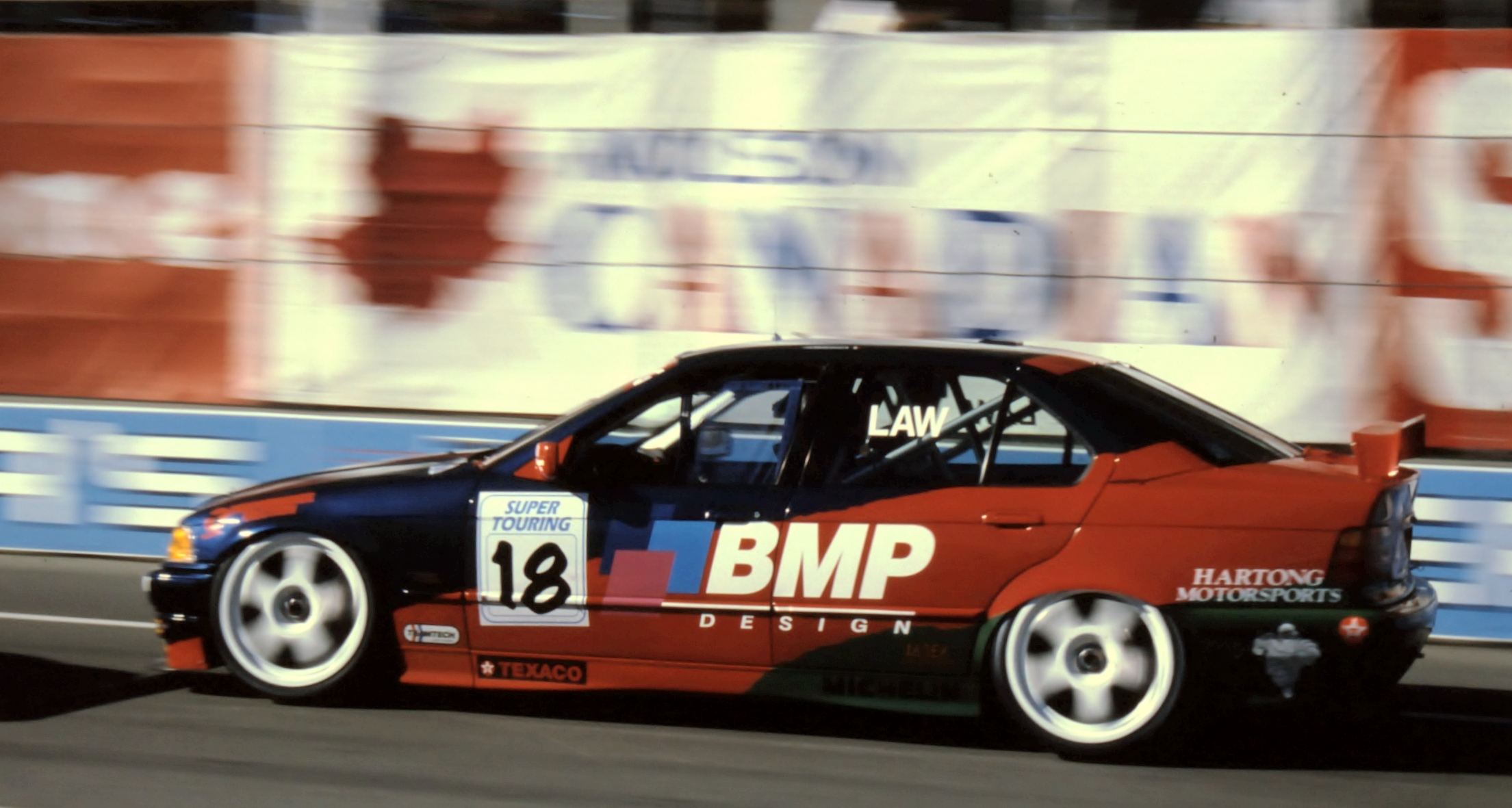
Hartong Motorsports BMW driven by Darren Law

- (United States) Jeff Andretti (7th in 1996)
- (Australia) Neil Crompton (3rd in 1997; 7 wins, 14 podiums)
- (United States) Peter Cunningham (5th in 1996, 2nd in 1997; 8 wins, 19 podiums)
- (United States) Dominic Dobson (2nd in 1996, 4th in 1997; 6 wins, 17 podiums)
- (United States) David Donohue (3rd in 1996, 1997 champion; 6 wins, 18 podiums)
- (New Zealand) Rod Millen (1 podium)
- (United States) Randy Pobst (1996 champion, 5th in 1997; 5 wins, 18 podiums)
- (United States) Darren Law (8th in 1996 and 1997; 1 win, 2 podiums)
