= Peter Cunningham (racing driver) =

American racing driver

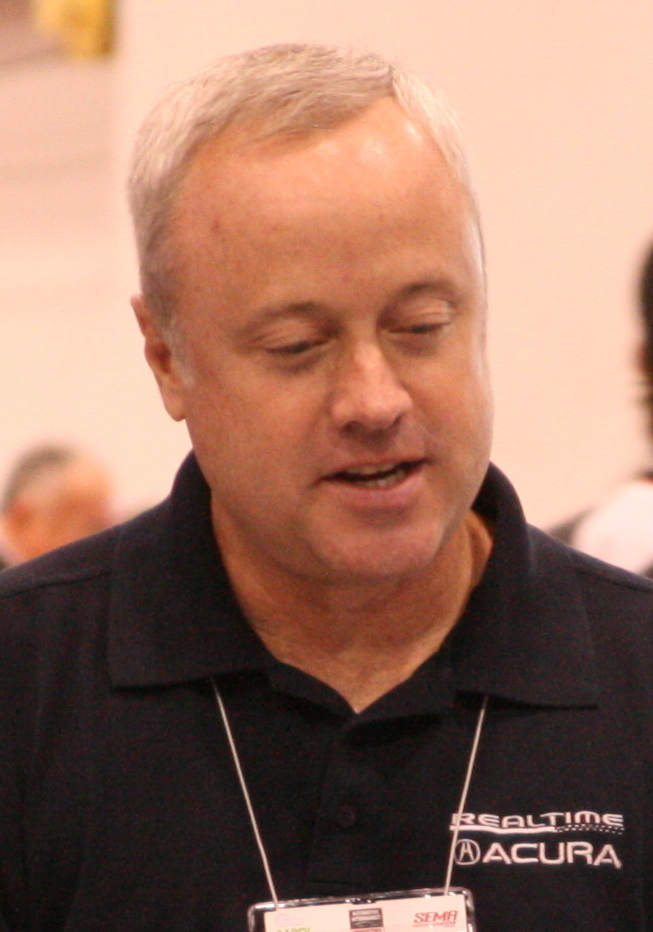
- Cunningham in 2009
- Nationality: American
- Born: 1 July 1962 (age 64) Milwaukee, Wisconsin, U.S.

Pirelli World Challenge career
- Debut season: 1990
- Current team: RealTime Racing
- Car number: 42
- Starts: 232
- Wins: 43
- Poles: 50

Previous series
- 2002–2008 2004 1999—2000 1998-1999 1999—2004 1996—1997 1995-1996 1992-1993 1990 1989—1990 1988 1987 1985—1989 1986-1994 1991—1998: IMSA Continental Tire Sports Car Challenge; Rolex Sports Car Series; Canadian Auto Sports Club Motorola Cup; American Le Mans Series; SCCA U.S. Road Racing Championship; Speedvision Cup; North American Touring Car Championship; IMSA Endurance Championship; SCCA ProRally; Truck Guard/Shellzone Challenge; International Ice Racing Association; SCCA Corvette Challenge; Pro Ice Endurance Championship; SCCA/Escort Endurance Championship; Firestone Firehawk Endurance Championship; IMSA Exxon GT

Championship titles
- 2012 2010 2008 2005 2002 1997 1995 1993 1990 1990 1989 1989 1988 1987: World Challenge GTS; World Challenge GTS; World Challenge Touring Car; World Challenge Touring Car; World Challenge Touring Car; World Challenge T1; World Challenge Class C SCCA ProRallyProduction; IIRA GT Endurance Champion; Truck Guard/Shellzone Challenge; IIRA Modified 4x4 SCCA/Escort Endurance Championship Class B SCCA/Escort Endurance Championship Class B PRO Ice GT Endurance

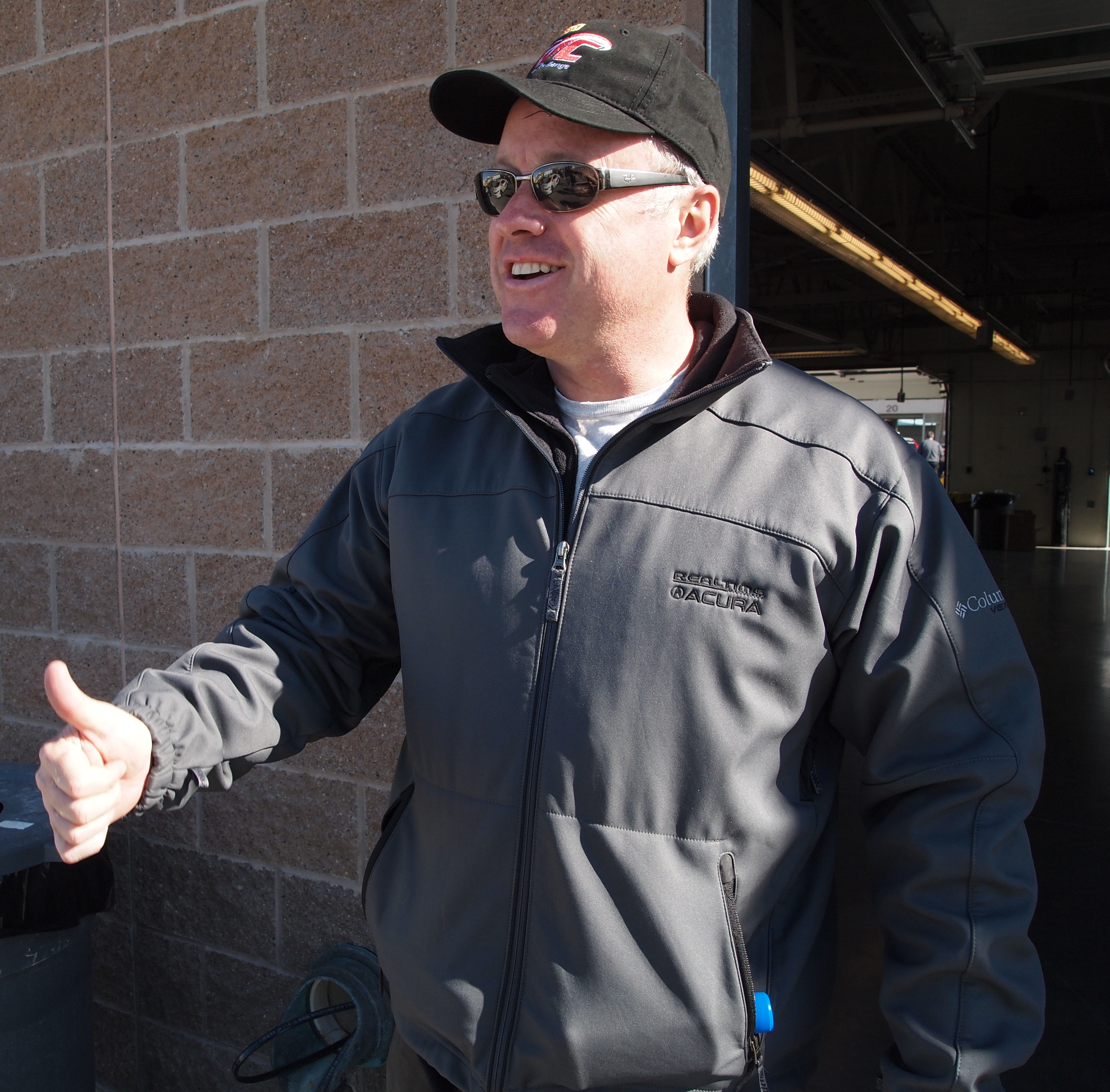
Cunningham after his 2011 Utah Grand Prix race

Peter "P.D." Cunningham (born July 1, 1962) is an American race car driver and owner of RealTime R&L, Inc., based in Saukville, Wisconsin and currently competing in the Pirelli World Challenge GT Championship. His name and his team, RealTime Racing, have become synonymous with the Honda and Acura brands. Through 2013, he has claimed 91 professional race wins across 12 different North American road racing series and holds numerous World Challenge records.

== Early career ==
Cunningham was born in Milwaukee, Wisconsin. As a recent high school graduate in June 1980, Cunningham happened upon an autocross, a driving contest held in a parking lot around a pylon-defined course against the clock. After winning his class on that first day, he became enamored and engulfed in the sport. Over the next several years, he won numerous regional and national titles in SCCA Solo II competition.

Cunningham's driving talent then evolved into road racing where he raced a number of Showroom Stock cars from 1982-1984. Attempting to balance college classes with his desired career path wasn't working for him, and despite the disappointment of his family, he quit school to chase his dream. In 1984, he won the June Sprints and a handful of other races on his way to winning the SCCA CEN-DIV SSC Championship in a SAAB 99 GLi.

=== SCCA National Championship Runoffs ===
Year	Track	Car	Engine	Class	Finish	Start	Status
1984	Road Atlanta	Saab 99 GLI		Showroom Stock C	11	11	Running
1988	Road Atlanta	Honda Civic Si		Showroom Stock C	2	2	Running

== Pro Racing Debut ==
In 1985, Cunningham joined the professional ranks of the sport, competing in the inaugural SCCA/Escort Endurance Championship piloting an SSA Toyota Supra for MPS Motorsports. The following year he and the team entered the championship with an SSGT Nissan 300ZX Turbo before stepping up to the top class in a SS-category Chevrolet Corvette in 1987.

In 1988, MPS entered the SCCA Corvette Challenge, earning Cunningham eight top-ten finishes, including a podium at his home race at Road America.

Cunningham became a force to be reckoned with in 1988 after switching to a Honda CRX Si and partnering with co-driver Lance Stewart for John Torok's Team GRR. He earned five race wins and finished outside the top-two only once that season. He followed it up with six consecutive race wins in 1989 once again behind the wheel of a Honda CRX Si, this time driving with Scott Gaylord.

In 1990, Cunningham gave trucks a try, entering the SCCA Truck Guard/Shellzone Challenge. Driving a Mazda B2000 for Team GRR, he finished on the podium six times, including a win at Laguna Seca.

In January 1987, Cunningham competed in a Honda for the first time, driving a first generation CRX Si in the PRO Ice Endurance Championship with an effort that would soon become RealTime Racing. This successful venture continued in 1989 with a second generation CRX Si and a modified 4WD Civic Wagon in a pair of International Ice Racing Association series. RealTime returned in 1990 with a Civic Si for the GT Endurance category and a turbocharged 4WD Civic Wagon for the Modified 4x4 class. His love of non-asphalt category motorsports continued in 1992–1993 with two seasons of SCCA ProRally competition. There, Cunningham collected six race wins in an Acura Integra GSR.

== World Challenge (1990–present) ==
Cunningham first entered SCCA Pro Racing's World Challenge Championships in 1990, driving a Honda CRX Si for American Honda in the Super Production category. He finished runner-up in the championship with two race wins and six podium finishes. Cunningham very briefly switched to a BMW M3 and Nissan Sentra SE-R in 1991 and 1992 before rejoining World Challenge with his own team, RealTime Racing, in 1993. In the team's debut season, campaigning a Honda Prelude, Cunningham finished runner-up in the C Class Championship by a slim three points in a season where he captured three wins and only once finished off the podium.

Cunningham was three points shy again in 1994 when he finished runner-up in the Super Production Category, collecting two race wins in a Honda Prelude Si. He finally claimed his first World Challenge Championship in 1995, when he only finished off the podium once in his Honda Prelude Si.

In 1996, Cunningham took on the challenge of the Acura NSX, built by RealTime for competition in the Touring 1 Category. He ended the season by scoring back-to-back race wins, the first for the NSX in World Challenge, and finished fifth in the points. The 1997 Touring 1 season bore more fruit, as Cunningham collected four race wins en route to his second World Challenge Championship. The following year (1998) Cunningham finished third in the Touring 1 Championship with two race wins.

After taking the 1999 World Challenge season off to race in the American Le Mans Series, Cunningham returned to World Challenge in 2000 to race a BMW M3 in the GT Class. He scored one race win and ended the year seventh in points.

Cunningham returned to the Acura NSX in 2001, driving a supercharged version in the GT category. He scored five race wins on the way to a runner-up finish in the points. The results were similar in 2002, as Cunningham finished runner-up in the GT Championship again with one race win.

In 2002, Cunningham transitioned back to the Touring Car category behind the wheel of an Acura Integra R. In his first season back in the Touring Car ranks since 1998, Cunningham took the Championship with one win, edging his RealTime teammate Pierre Kleinubing for the title.

From 2003 to 2004, Cunningham was tasked with operating Nissan's factory Touring Car program, putting him behind the wheel of a Nissan SE-R Spec V. Cunningham's Team RTR effort collected two race victories in the Nissan, finishing fourth in points in 2003 and fifth in 2004.

It was back to Acuras in 2005 and Cunningham picked up where he left off, capturing the Touring Car Championship in an Acura TSX with a race victory and podium finishes in over half of the season's races. Still piloting the TSX, he finished fourth in points in 2006 and fifth in 2007 with two race wins.

Cunningham reclaimed the Championship spotlight again in 2008, narrowly beating RealTime teammates Kleinubing and Kuno Wittmer (all in Acura TSXs) for the Touring Car crown. He followed it up with a third-place finish in the 2009 Touring Car points, scoring one race victory.

In 2010, RealTime Racing and the Acura TSX switched to the new GTS category, which Cunningham won in dominating style, with eight race wins and more than 400 points ahead of teammate Nick Esayian. Competition in the GTS category intensified in 2011 and Cunningham was held to one victory in the TSX en route to a third-place finish in the points.

In response to the heightened GTS competition, the TSX was upgraded to a V6 engine in 2012, breathing new life into RealTime and Cunningham's efforts. He scored his record extending tenth SCCA Pro Racing Drivers' Championship on the strength of two race victories.

In addition to holding the record for most World Challenge championships (seven), as of the 2013 season, Cunningham holds series records for most starts (232), wins (43), poles (50), podiums (118), top-five finishes (158), top-10 finishes (198) and fastest laps (28).

At the 2014 Detroit Auto Show, it was revealed that Cunningham and RealTime Racing would campaign the Acura TLX in World Challenge's GT class. He competed in two rounds in 2014. The next year he raced the Acura TLX full-time.

== IMSA Firestone Firehawk Endurance Championship (1986–1994) ==
Cunningham's first season in the Firestone Firehawk Endurance Championship was behind the wheel of a Nissan 300ZX Turbo (GS Class) in 1986. In 1987 he switched to a Honda CRX Si and won T Class races at Watkins Glen (his first pro win) with Norris Rancourt, John Green, Scott Gaylord and Mark Wolocatiuk, and then at Road America with Lance Stewart. In 1988 he and Stewart partnered again in the CRX (S Class).

The 1989 season saw Cunningham add a Chevrolet Camaro (GS Class) for Mainline Racing in addition to his Honda CRX Si (S Class). Driving with Bill Artzberger he won at Road America in the Honda and again at Portland partnering with Peter Schwartzott. He won with Mark Hutchins in the Camaro at Lime Rock Park and Watkins Glen. 1990 brought another season of running both the Honda (now T Class) and the Camaro. He earned wins at Sebring and Road Atlanta in the Honda, driving with Scott Gaylord. 1991 was a short season, but did bring a runner-up finish in the Watkins Glen 24-hour race with the Honda and co-drivers John Green, Lance Stewart and Daniel Veilleux.

In 1992, Cunningham paired with Boris Said to drive a No Fear Dodge Stealth in the S Class. The duo won four races that year, propelling Said to the drivers' championship. Cunningham finished fourth, one point in arrears in this competitive battle, as his teammate's pole position in the rain at Watkins Glen gave him the advantage.

The 1993 season brought a switch to a Honda Prelude for the Honda of America Racing Team (HART), first the VTEC iteration for the S Class and later an Si model for the T Class. He finished on the podium twice with co-driver Forrest Granlund. The Prelude VTEC returned again in 1994 for more S Class competition. Cunningham and Granlund won three races.

== IMSA Endurance Championship (1995–1996) ==
The Cunningham/Granlund duo took their Honda Prelude VTEC to the IMSA Endurance Championship in 1995, winning six races and finishing off the podium only once. Cunningham was forced to miss a race or two due to his RTR World Challenge commitments, allowing Granlund to score enough points for the drivers' championship.

In 1996, Cunningham entered three races, driving a Ford Mustang Cobra R for Steeda Racing (GS Class) twice and entering one race in the Honda Prelude Si (T Class).

== IMSA Exxon GT (1991–1998) ==
From 1991 to 1997, Cunningham had four starts in the IMSA Exxon GT series. He entered the full season in 1998 driving a BMW M3 for TeamPTG. He finished on the podium for eight consecutive races including a race win at Lime Rock with co-driver Ross Bentley.

== IMSA American Le Mans Series (1999–2004) ==
Cunningham has 19 starts and five podium finishes in the American Le Mans Series, all but one of them in a TeamPTG BMW M3 (GT class). His last start, in 2004, was in a Flying Lizards Porsche 911 GT3 RSR at the 12 Hours of Sebring.

== GRAND-AM (2002–2008) ==
Cunningham has accumulated 13 starts in GRAND-AM's Continental Tire Sports Car Challenge (previously known as Koni Challenge and Grand-Am Cup). His first foray was in 2002 with the Acura NSX in the GS II class where he enjoyed a runner-up finish at VIR and a sixth-place finish at St. Jovite with co-driver Benoit Theetge. He made singular starts in 2006 and 2007 driving in an Acura TSX, but took a run at a full season in 2008 driving for i-Moto Racing. He and co-driver Kuno Wittmer stood on the podium twice in 2008 and Cunningham ended the season sixth in points – earning him the ST Rookie of the Year title. He made two more starts in 2010, driving a RealTime Racing Honda Civic Si with Nick Wittmer.

In 2004, Cunningham entered the Rolex 24 at Daytona with Flying Lizard Motorsport driving a Porsche in the GT category. Driving with Johannes Van Overbeek, Mike Rockenfeller, Seth Neiman and Lonnie Pechnik, the team earned the class pole and finished second in a photo finish.

== CART North American Touring Car Championship (1996–1997) ==
Cunningham entered a HART Honda Accord in the 1996 North American Touring Car Championship winning four out of eight races in his debut season. He collected another four race wins in the Accord the following season, finishing second in the drivers' championship.

== Professional Sports Car Racing Speedvision Cup (1997–1998) ==
The 1997 season of the Speedvision Cup saw Cunningham drive a Honda Prelude Si, Honda Prelude VTEC and Honda Accord EX. With the Accord, and co-driver Jason Potter, he won the season finale at Las Vegas. The following year he entered just one race, at Sebring, in a BMW 328is with Mike Fitzgerald, and won.

== SCCA U.S. Road Racing Championship (1998–1999) ==
In five starts across two seasons of the U.S. Road Racing Championship, Cunningham took home two race wins, both behind the wheel of a BMW M3 (GT3 Class) in 1998. The first, at Daytona, with co-drivers Bill Auberlen, Marc Duez and Boris Said. The second, in Minneapolis, with Brian Simo.

== Canadian Auto Sports Club Motorola Cup (1999–2000) ==
Cunningham has three starts recorded in the Motorola Cup, two in a Toyota Supra Turbo (GS Class) with Peter Tonelli in 1999. In 2000, his sole start at Mosport in a Honda Civic EX (C Class) with John Schmitt produced a win.
