= List of GT World Challenge America circuits =

This is a list of racetracks which have hosted a GT World Challenge America race between 1990 and 2022. This list includes SRO America's GT4 America, TC America and GT America series. Several nations have hosted a race, including the United States, Canada, Mexico, and Puerto Rico. Canadian Tire Motorsport Park has hosted the series in 28 of its 34 seasons, the most of any track. The 7 tracks which are hosting a race in the 2026 season, are listed in bold.

Key
✔	Current circuits (for the 2026 season)	*	Returning circuits (for the 2027 season)

Circuit	Type	Location	Seasons	Total	Map
Autobahn Country Club	Road course	(United States) Joliet, Illinois; 41°27′17″N 088°07′38″W	2009	1	
Autodrome Del Norte	Road course	(Mexico) Saltillo, Coahuila, Mexico; 25°35′38″N 100°55′15″W	1991	1	
**Barber Motorsports Park** ✔	Road course	(United States) Birmingham, Alabama; 33°31′57″N 86°37′08″W	2014–2016, 2024–2026	6	Barber
Belle Isle Street Circuit	Street circuit	(United States) Detroit; 42°20′10″N 82°59′44″W	2001, 2008, 2012–2015	6	Detroit Belle Isle
Bicentennial Park	Street circuit	(United States) Miami; 25°47′02″N 80°11′13″W	1994	1	
Brainerd International Raceway	Road course	(United States) Brainerd, Minnesota; 46°25′1″N 94°16′23″W	2014	1	Brainerd
Canadian Tire Motorsport Park	Road course	(Canada) Bowmanville, Ontario; 44°2′53″N 78°40′32″W	1990–1997, 1999–2012, 2014–2019	28	Mosport Park
Charlotte Motor Speedway	Roval	(United States) Concord, North Carolina; 35°21′3″N 80°41′1″W	2000, 2007	2	Charlotte
**Circuit of the Americas** ✔	Road course	(United States) Austin, Texas; 30°7′58″N 97°38′28″W	2013, 2015–2021, 2023–2026 (2 in 2020)	13	Austin
Circuit Riverside Speedway Ste-Croix	Roval	(Canada) Sainte-Croix, Quebec; 46°37′55″N 71°47′17″W	2000	1	
Circuit Trois-Rivières	Street circuit	(Canada) Trois-Rivières, Quebec; 46°20′51″N 72°33′31″W	1993–1999, 2002	8	Trois-Rivières
Cleveland Burke Lakefront Airport	Street circuit	(United States) Cleveland; 41°31′2″N 81°40′59″W	1992, 2005	2	Cleveland
Dallas Street Circuit at Addison Airport	Street circuit	(United States) Addison, Texas; 32°58′07″N 096°50′11″W	1990–1991	2	
Dallas Street Circuit at Reunion Arena	Street circuit	(United States) Dallas; 32°46′22″N 96°48′29″W	1993–1994	2	
Denver Street Circuit at Pepsi Center	Street circuit	(United States) Denver; 39°44′48″N 105°0′23″W	2005–2006	2	Denver Pepsi Centre
Denver Street Circuit at the Civic Center	Street circuit	(United States) Denver; 39°44′21″N 104°59′22″W	1990–1991	2	Denver Civic Center
Des Moines Street Circuit	Street circuit	(United States) Des Moines, Iowa; 41°35′36″N 93°37′24″W	1990–1994	5	
Firebird International Raceway	Road course	(United States) Chandler, Arizona; 33°16′8″N 111°57′58″W	1992	1	Firebird
Grand Rapids Street Circuit	Street circuit	(United States) Grand Rapids, Michigan; 42°57′40″N 85°39′20″W	1998–1999	2	
Heartland Park Topeka	Road course	(United States) Topeka, Kansas; 38°55′29″N 95°40′26″W	1997–1998	2	Heartland
**Indianapolis Motor Speedway** ✔	Roval	(United States) Speedway, Indiana; 39°47′14″N 86°13′30″W	2020–2026	7	Indianapolis
Las Vegas Motor Speedway	Roval	(United States) Clark County, Nevada; 36°16′17″N 115°0′40″W	2000, 2019	2	Las Vegas
Lime Rock Park	Road course	(United States) Lakeville, Connecticut; 41°55′40″N 73°23′1″W	1992–1993, 1995–2005, 2007–2008, 2013, 2017–2018	19	Lime Rock
Long Beach Street Circuit	Street circuit	(United States) Long Beach, California; 33°45′59″N 118°11′34″W	2006–2019, 2024–2025	16	Long Beach
Mid-Ohio Sports Car Course	Road course	(United States) Troy Township, Morrow County, Ohio; 40°41′21″N 82°38′11″W	1994, 1997–1999, 2002–2017	20	Mid-Ohio
Minneapolis Street Circuit	Street circuit	(United States) Minneapolis; 44°58′39″N 93°15′17″W	1996–1998	3	
Nashville Street Circuit	Road Course	(United States) Nashville, Tenesse; 36°09′53″N 86°46′16″W	2021–2023	3	Nashville
New Jersey Motorsports Park	Road course	(United States) Millville, New Jersey; 39°21′32″N 75°3′42″W	2008–2009, 2014	3	New Jersey
NOLA Motorsports Park	Road course	(United States) Avondale, Louisiana; 29°53′1″N 90°11′52″W	2022–2023	2	NOLA
Phoenix International Raceway	Roval	(United States) Avondale, Arizona; 33°22′29″N 112°18′40″W	1995–1996	2	Phoenix
Pikes Peak International Raceway	Roval	(United States) Fountain, Colorado; 38°35′29″N 104°40′34″W	1997–1999	3	Pikes Peak
Portland International Raceway	Road course	(United States) Portland, Oregon; 45°35′49″N 122°41′45″W	2001, 2004–2005, 2018–2019	5	Portland
Reliant Park	Street circuit	(United States) Houston; 29°40′56″N 95°24′31″W	2013	1	Houston
Reno Street Course	Street circuit	(United States) Reno, Nevada; 39°31′22″N 119°46′45″W	1996–1997	2	Reno
**Road America** ✔	Road course	(United States) Elkhart Lake, Wisconsin; 43°48′0″N 87°59′13″W	1991–1996, 1998, 2002–2004, 2006, 2008–2009, 2014–2026	25	Road America
**Road Atlanta** ✔	Road course	(United States) Braselton, Georgia; 34°8′48″N 83°49′4″W	1990, 1993–1995, 1999–2009, 2011, 2026	17	Road Atlanta
St. Petersburg Street Circuit	Street circuit	(United States) St. Petersburg, Florida; 27°45′59″N 82°37′45″W	1990, 1996–1997, 2005–2006, 2010–2019, 2022–2023	17	St. Petersburg
San Diego Street Circuit	Street circuit	(United States) San Diego; 32°44′8″N 117°12′44″W	2000	1	
San Juan Airport Circuit	Street circuit	(Puerto Rico) San Juan, Puerto Rico; 18°27′24″N 066°05′54″W	2003	1	
**Sebring International Raceway** ✔	Road course	(United States) Sebring, Florida; 27°27′17″N 81°20′54″W	2001–2009, 2021–2026	15	Sebring
**Sonoma Raceway** ✔	Road course	(United States) Sonoma, California; 38°9′36″N 122°27′34″W	1990–1993, 1995–1996, 2000–2001, 2003–2006, 2011–2017, 2019–2026	27	Sonoma
Texas Motor Speedway	Roval	(United States) Fort Worth, Texas; 33°2′13″N 97°16′59″W	2000–2001	2	Texas
Texas World Speedway	Roval	(United States) College Station, Texas; 30°32′13″N 96°13′16″W	1991	1	Texas World
Toronto Street Circuit at Exhibition Place	Street circuit	(Canada) Toronto, Ontario; 43°37′58″N 79°24′58″W	2007, 2010, 2013–2014	4	Toronto
Utah Motorsports Campus	Road course	(United States) Tooele, Utah; 40°34′30″N 112°22′29″W	2006–2008, 2010–2012, 2014–2018	11	Utah
Vancouver Street Circuit at Concord Pacific Place	Street circuit	(Canada) Vancouver; 49°16′35″N 123°6′25″W	1999	1	Vancouver
Virginia International Raceway	Road course	(United States) Alton, Virginia; 36°33′42″N 79°12′17″W	2002, 2008, 2010, 2017–2025	12	Virginia
Washington Street Circuit	Street circuit	(United States) Washington, D.C. 38°53′41″N 76°58′12″W	2002	1	Washington
**Watkins Glen International** *	Road course	(United States) Watkins Glen, New York; 42°20′13″N 76°55′38″W	1992, 1996–1998, 2007–2010, 2018–2019, 2021–2022	12	Watkins Glen
WeatherTech Raceway Laguna Seca	Road course	(United States) Monterey, California; 36°35′05″N 121°45′10″W	1990, 1999–2007, 2009, 2011–2012, 2015–2019	18	Laguna Seca

== See also ==
- List of IMSA SportsCar Championship circuits
- List of World Sportscar Championship circuits
- List of Can-Am Challenge Cup circuits
- List of IMSA GT Championship circuits
- List of American Le Mans Series circuits
