= 2008 Speed World Challenge =

2008 Speed World Challenge season

Seasons
- ← 2007 2009 →

The 2008 Speed World Challenge season was the 19th Speed World Challenge season. It began March 14, 2008, and finished on October 4, 2008, after 13 rounds. The defending champions were Jeff Altenburg in Touring Car and Randy Pobst in Grand Touring competition.

== Schedule ==
Date	Location	Classes	
March 14	Sebring	GT	TC
April 20	Long Beach	GT	
April 27	Virginia		TC
May 18	Utah	GT	TC
May 24	Lime Rock		TC
May 26	Lime Rock		TC
June 8	Watkins Glen	GT	TC
July 20	Mid Ohio	GT	TC
August 10	Road America	GT	TC
August 24	Mosport Park	GT	TC
August 30	Belle Isle	GT	
September 28	New Jersey	GT	
October 3	Road Atlanta	GT	TC

Schedule is subject to change.

== Race results ==
Rnd	Circuit	GT Winning Car	TC Winning Car
Rnd	Circuit	GT Winning Driver	TC Winning Driver
1	Sebring	#1 K-PAX Racing Porsche 911 GT3	#43 RealTime Racing Acura TSX
1	Sebring	(United States) Randy Pobst	(Brazil) Pierre Kleinubing
2	Long Beach	#10 ACS Express Ford Mustang Cobra	
2	Long Beach	(United States) Brandon Davis	
3	Virginia		#44 RealTime Racing Acura TSX
3	Virginia		(Canada) Kuno Wittmer
4	Utah	#13 Woodhouse Performance Dodge Viper	#74 Tri-Point Motorsports Mazda 6
4	Utah	(United States) Tommy Archer	(United States) Jason Saini
5	Lime Rock		#44 RealTime Racing Acura TSX
5	Lime Rock		(Canada) Kuno Wittmer
6	Lime Rock		#97 Tindol Motorsports Mazda 6
6	Lime Rock		(United States) Chip Herr
7	Watkins Glen	#1 K-PAX Racing Porsche 911 GT3	#95 Tindol Motorsports Mazda 6
7	Watkins Glen	(United States) Randy Pobst	(United States) Michael Galati
8	Mid-Ohio	#13 Woodhouse Performance Dodge Viper	#44 RealTime Racing Acura TSX
8	Mid-Ohio	(United States) Tommy Archer	(Canada) Kuno Wittmer
9	Road America	#13 Woodhouse Performance Dodge Viper	#36 BimmerWorld BMW 325i
9	Road America	(United States) Tommy Archer	(United States) James Clay
10	Mosport Park	#30 Whelen Motorsports Chevrolet Corvette	#95 Tindol Motorsports Mazda 6
10	Mosport Park	(United States) Eric Curran	(United States) Michael Galati
11	Detroit	#1 K-PAX Racing Porsche 911 GT3	
11	Detroit	(United States) Randy Pobst	
12	New Jersey	#14 Global Motorsports Group Porsche 911 GT3	
12	New Jersey	(United States) James Sofronas	
13	Road Atlanta	#10 ACS Express Ford Mustang Cobra	#97 Tindol Motorsports Mazda 6
13	Road Atlanta	(United States) Brandon Davis	(United States) Chip Herr
