= 2005 Speed World Challenge =

Seasons
- ← 2004 2006 →

The 2005 Speed World Challenge season was the 16th season of the Sports Car Club of America's World Challenge series. The series' title sponsor was television network Speed Channel, who broadcast all the races. Championships were awarded for grand touring and touring cars. The season began on March 18 and ran for eleven rounds. Andy Pilgrim and Cadillac won the championships in GT, and Peter Cunningham and Acura won in Touring Car.

== Schedule ==
Rnd	Date	Circuit	Supporting	Distance	GT Winning Car	TC Winning Car
Rnd	Date	Circuit	Supporting	Distance	GT Winning Driver	TC Winning Driver
1	March 18	Sebring International Raceway, Sebring, Florida	American Le Mans Series (12 Hours of Sebring)	67 mi (108 km) (TC); 74 mi (119 km) (GT)	Dodge Viper	Acura TSX
1	March 18	Sebring International Raceway, Sebring, Florida	American Le Mans Series (12 Hours of Sebring)	67 mi (108 km) (TC); 74 mi (119 km) (GT)	(United States) Tommy Archer	(United States) Peter Cunningham
2	April 3	Streets of St. Petersburg, Florida	IndyCar Series (Grand Prix of St. Petersburg)	47 mi (76 km) (TC); 52 mi (84 km) (GT)	Dodge Viper	Mazda 6
2	April 3	Streets of St. Petersburg, Florida	IndyCar Series (Grand Prix of St. Petersburg)	47 mi (76 km) (TC); 52 mi (84 km) (GT)	(United States) Tommy Archer	(United States) Randy Pobst
3	April 16; April 17	Road Atlanta, Braselton, Georgia	American Le Mans Series (Grand Prix of Atlanta)	64 mi (103 km) (TC); 74 mi (119 km) (GT)	Cadillac CTS-V	Acura TSX
3	April 16; April 17	Road Atlanta, Braselton, Georgia	American Le Mans Series (Grand Prix of Atlanta)	64 mi (103 km) (TC); 74 mi (119 km) (GT)	(Italy) Max Papis	(Brazil) Pierre Kleinubing
4	May 22; May 21	Mid-Ohio Sports Car Course, Lexington, Ohio	American Le Mans Series (Grand Prix of Atlanta)	56 mi (90 km) (TC); 65 mi (105 km) (GT)	Porsche 911 Cup	Acura TSX
4	May 22; May 21	Mid-Ohio Sports Car Course, Lexington, Ohio	American Le Mans Series (Grand Prix of Atlanta)	56 mi (90 km) (TC); 65 mi (105 km) (GT)	(Germany) Wolf Henzler	(Brazil) Pierre Kleinubing
5	June 25; June 26	Burke Lakefront Airport, Cleveland, Ohio	Champ Car World Series (Grand Prix of Cleveland)	63 mi (101 km) (TC); 69 mi (111 km) (GT)	Porsche 911 Cup	Acura TSX
5	June 25; June 26	Burke Lakefront Airport, Cleveland, Ohio	Champ Car World Series (Grand Prix of Cleveland)	63 mi (101 km) (TC); 69 mi (111 km) (GT)	(United Kingdom) Robin Liddell	(Brazil) Pierre Kleinubing
6	July 2	Lime Rock Park, Lakeville, Connecticut	American Le Mans Series (New England Grand Prix)	63 mi (101 km) (TC); 67 mi (108 km) (GT)	Cadillac CTS-V	BMW 325i
6	July 2	Lime Rock Park, Lakeville, Connecticut	American Le Mans Series (New England Grand Prix)	63 mi (101 km) (TC); 67 mi (108 km) (GT)	(Italy) Max Angelelli	(United States) Bill Auberlen
7	July 17; July 16	Infineon Raceway, Sonoma, California	American Le Mans Series (Grand Prix of Sonoma)	58 mi (93 km) (TC); 63 mi (101 km) (GT)	Chevrolet Corvette C6	BMW 325i
7	July 17; July 16	Infineon Raceway, Sonoma, California	American Le Mans Series (Grand Prix of Sonoma)	58 mi (93 km) (TC); 63 mi (101 km) (GT)	(United States) Lou Gigliotti	(United States) Bill Auberlen
8	July 30; July 31	Portland International Raceway, Portland, Oregon	American Le Mans Series (Portland Grand Prix)	61 mi (98 km) (TC); 65 mi (105 km) (GT)	Chevrolet Corvette C6	Mazda 6
8	July 30; July 31	Portland International Raceway, Portland, Oregon	American Le Mans Series (Portland Grand Prix)	61 mi (98 km) (TC); 65 mi (105 km) (GT)	(United States) Dino Crescentini	(United States) Randy Pobst
9	August 13; August 14	Streets of Denver, Colorado	Champ Car World Series (Centrix Financial Grand Prix of Denver)	49 mi (79 km) (TC); 53 mi (85 km) (GT)	Porsche 911 Cup	Acura RSX
9	August 13; August 14	Streets of Denver, Colorado	Champ Car World Series (Centrix Financial Grand Prix of Denver)	49 mi (79 km) (TC); 53 mi (85 km) (GT)	(Germany) Wolf Henzler	(United States) Eric Curran
10	September 4 September 3	Mosport International Raceway, Bowmanville, Ontario	American Le Mans Series (Grand Prix of Mosport)	69 mi (111 km) (TC); 64 mi (103 km) (GT)	Cadillac CTS-V	Mazda 6
10	September 4 September 3	Mosport International Raceway, Bowmanville, Ontario	American Le Mans Series (Grand Prix of Mosport)	69 mi (111 km) (TC); 64 mi (103 km) (GT)	(Canada) Ron Fellows	(United States) Charles Espenlaub
11	October 16	Mazda Raceway Laguna Seca, Monterey, California	American Le Mans Series (Monterey Sports Car Championships)	58 mi (93 km) (TC); 45 mi (72 km) (GT)	Cadillac CTS-V	Audi A4T
11	October 16	Mazda Raceway Laguna Seca, Monterey, California	American Le Mans Series (Monterey Sports Car Championships)	58 mi (93 km) (TC); 45 mi (72 km) (GT)	(Italy) Max Papis	(United States) John Angelone
