= 2004 Speed World Challenge =

Seasons
- ← 2003 2005 →

The 2004 Speed World Challenge season was the 15th season of the Sports Car Club of America's World Challenge series. The series' title sponsor was television network Speed Channel, who broadcast all the races. Championships were awarded for grand touring and touring cars. The season began on March 19 and ran for ten rounds. Tommy Archer and Audi won the championships in GT, and Bill Auberlen and BMW won in Touring Car. The season marked the first wins for the Cadillac brand, a step up for General Motors after three of its brands declined in the nineties.

== Schedule ==
Rnd		Date	Circuit	Supporting	Distance	GT Winning Car	TC Winning Car
GT	TC	Date	Circuit	Supporting	Distance	GT Winning Driver	TC Winning Driver
1	1	March 19	Sebring International Raceway, Sebring, Florida	American Le Mans Series (12 Hours of Sebring)	63 mi (101 km) (TC); 74 mi (119 km) (GT)	Cadillac CTS-V	BMW 325i
1	1	March 19	Sebring International Raceway, Sebring, Florida	American Le Mans Series (12 Hours of Sebring)	63 mi (101 km) (TC); 74 mi (119 km) (GT)	(Italy) Max Angelelli	(United States) Bill Auberlen
2	2	May 31	Lime Rock Park, Lakeville, Connecticut	Stand-alone event	66 mi (106 km) (TC); 70 mi (110 km) (GT)	Audi RS6	BMW 325i
2	2	May 31	Lime Rock Park, Lakeville, Connecticut	Stand-alone event	66 mi (106 km) (TC); 70 mi (110 km) (GT)	(United States) Randy Pobst	(United States) Bill Auberlen
3	3	June 26	Mid-Ohio Sports Car Course, Lexington, Ohio	American Le Mans Series (American Le Mans at Mid-Ohio)	60 mi (97 km) (TC); 54 mi (87 km) (GT)	Audi RS6	Acura TSX
3	3	June 26	Mid-Ohio Sports Car Course, Lexington, Ohio	American Le Mans Series (American Le Mans at Mid-Ohio)	60 mi (97 km) (TC); 54 mi (87 km) (GT)	(United States) Michael Galati	(United States) Matt Plumb
4	4	July 17	Infineon Raceway, Sonoma, California	American Le Mans Series (Grand Prix of Sonoma)	58 mi (93 km) (TC); 63 mi (101 km) (GT)	Porsche 911 Cup	BMW 325i
4	4	July 17	Infineon Raceway, Sonoma, California	American Le Mans Series (Grand Prix of Sonoma)	58 mi (93 km) (TC); 63 mi (101 km) (GT)	(Germany) Wolf Henzler	(United States) Bill Auberlen
	5	July 18	Infineon Raceway, Sonoma, California	American Le Mans Series (Grand Prix of Sonoma)	58 mi (93 km) (TC)	did not participate	BMW 325Ci
	5	July 18	Infineon Raceway, Sonoma, California	American Le Mans Series (Grand Prix of Sonoma)	58 mi (93 km) (TC)	did not participate	(Sweden) Niclas Jönsson
5	6	July 24	Portland International Raceway, Portland, Oregon	American Le Mans Series (Portland Grand Prix)	58 mi (93 km) (TC); 60 mi (97 km) (GT)	Dodge Viper Competition Coupe	Acura TSX
5	6	July 24	Portland International Raceway, Portland, Oregon	American Le Mans Series (Portland Grand Prix)	58 mi (93 km) (TC); 60 mi (97 km) (GT)	(United States) Tommy Archer	(Brazil) Pierre Kleinubing
6		August 7	Mosport International Raceway, Bowmanville, Ontario	American Le Mans Series (Grand Prix of Mosport)	74 mi (119 km) (GT)	Audi RS6	did not participate
6		August 7	Mosport International Raceway, Bowmanville, Ontario	American Le Mans Series (Grand Prix of Mosport)	74 mi (119 km) (GT)	(United States) Michael Galati	did not participate
7	7	August 8	Mosport International Raceway, Bowmanville, Ontario	American Le Mans Series (Grand Prix of Mosport)	69 mi (111 km) (TC); 74 mi (119 km) (GT)	Cadillac CTS-V	Acura TSX
7	7	August 8	Mosport International Raceway, Bowmanville, Ontario	American Le Mans Series (Grand Prix of Mosport)	69 mi (111 km) (TC); 74 mi (119 km) (GT)	(Canada) Ron Fellows	(United States) Matt Plumb
8	8	August 22; August 21	Road America, Elkhart Lake, Wisconsin	American Le Mans Series (Road America 500)	69 mi (111 km) (TC); 73 mi (117 km) (GT)	Audi RS6	Nissan Sentra SE-R
8	8	August 22; August 21	Road America, Elkhart Lake, Wisconsin	American Le Mans Series (Road America 500)	69 mi (111 km) (TC); 73 mi (117 km) (GT)	(United States) Michael Galati	(United States) Peter Cunningham
9	9	September 24	Road Atlanta, Braselton, Georgia	American Le Mans Series (Petit Le Mans)	69 mi (111 km) (TC); 74 mi (119 km) (GT)	Cadillac CTS-V	Acura TSX
9	9	September 24	Road Atlanta, Braselton, Georgia	American Le Mans Series (Petit Le Mans)	69 mi (111 km) (TC); 74 mi (119 km) (GT)	(Italy) Max Angelelli	(Brazil) Pierre Kleinubing
10	10	October 17	Mazda Raceway Laguna Seca, Monterey, California	American Le Mans Series (Monterey Sports Car Championships)	58 mi (93 km) (TC); 63 mi (101 km) (GT)	Porsche 911 Cup	Mazda 6
10	10	October 17	Mazda Raceway Laguna Seca, Monterey, California	American Le Mans Series (Monterey Sports Car Championships)	58 mi (93 km) (TC); 63 mi (101 km) (GT)	(Germany) Wolf Henzler	(United States) Jeff Altenburg
