= 2006 Speed World Challenge =

2006 Speed World Challenge season

Seasons
- ← 2005 2007 →

The 2006 Speed World Challenge season was the 17th season of the SCCA Pro Racing Speed World Challenge. It began on March 15 at Sebring International Raceway and ended on October 21 at Road Atlanta after ten rounds.

== Schedule ==
Date	Location	Classes	
March 15	Sebring	GT	TC
March 30	St. Petersburg	GT	TC
April 7	Long Beach	GT	
May 19	Mid Ohio	GT	TC
June 23	Infineon	GT	TC
July 13	Miller	GT	TC
August 11	Denver		TC
August 18	Road America	GT	TC
September 1	Mosport	GT	TC
October 3	Road Atlanta	GT	TC
October 19	Laguna Seca	GT	TC

== Results ==
Round	Date	Circuit	Winning driver (GT) Winning Driver (TC)	Winning Vehicle (GT) Winning Vehicle (TC)
1	March 16–17	Sebring	(United States) Mike McCann (United States) Bill Auberlen	Dodge Viper BMW 325i
2	April 1	St. Petersburg	(United States) Lawson Aschenbach (United States) Randy Pobst	Porsche 911 GT3 Mazda6
3	April 9	Long Beach	(Canada) Ron Fellows Did not participate	Cadillac CTS-V Did not participate
4	April 21	Mid Ohio	(United States) Lou Gigliotti (United States) Chip Herr	Chevrolet Corvette C6 Audi A4
5	June 25	Infineon	(United States) Ricardo Emery (Brazil) Pierre Kleinubing	Porsche 911 GT3 Acura TSX
6	July 15	Miller	(United States) Lou Gigliotti (Brazil) Pierre Kleinubing	Chevrolet Corvette C6 Acura TSX
7	August 13	Denver	Did not participate (United States) Brandon Davis	Did not participate Acura TSX
8	August 20	Road America	(United States) Tommy Archer (United States) Chip Herr	Dodge SRT Viper Audi S4
9	September 3	Mosport	(United States) Michael Galati (United States) Chip Herr	Volvo S60R Audi A4
10	October 5	Road Atlanta	(United States) Lawson Aschenbach (United States) Michael Galati	Cadillac CTS-V
11	October 22	Laguna Seca	(United States) Randy Pobst (United States) Eric Curran	Porsche 911 Acura RSX
