= 1993 SCCA Pro Racing World Challenge =

Seasons
- ← 1992 1994 →

The 1993 SCCA Pro Racing World Challenge season was the fourth running of the Sports Car Club of America's World Challenge series. The D class from 1992 was dropped. Lotus got its final series win, after which the brand would eventually be removed from the American market for several years before returning with the Elise.

== Results ==
Round	Circuit	Winning driver (A) Winning Driver (B) Winning Driver (C)	Winning Vehicle (A) Winning Vehicle (B) Winning Vehicle (C)
1	(United States) Road Atlanta	(United States) David Murry (United States) Kermit Upton III (United States) Ron Emmick	Lotus Esprit BMW M3; Oldsmobile Achieva
2	(Canada) Mosport	(United States) Elliott Forbes-Robinson (United States) Neil Hannemann (United States) Ron Emmick	Nissan 300ZX Eagle Talon; Oldsmobile Achieva
3	(United States) Sears Point International Raceway	(United States) Elliott Forbes-Robinson (United States) Neil Hannemann (United States) Peter Cunningham	Nissan 300ZX Eagle Talon; Honda Prelude
4	(United States) Des Moines Street Circuit	(United States) R.K. Smith (United States) Lou Gigliotti (United States) Ron Emmick	Chevrolet Corvette Chevrolet Camaro; Oldsmobile Achieva
5	(United States) Lime Rock Park	(United States) Elliott Forbes-Robinson (United States) David Lapham (United States) Peter Cunningham	Nissan 300ZX Mazda RX-7; Honda Prelude Si
6	(Canada) Circuit Trois-Rivieres	(United States) Elliott Forbes-Robinson (United States) Willy Lewis (United States) Ron Emmick	Nissan 300ZX Eagle Talon; Oldsmobile Achieva
7	(United States) Road America	(United States) Elliott Forbes-Robinson (United States) Lou Gigliotti (United States) Norris Rancourt	Nissan 300ZX Chevrolet Camaro; Honda Prelude
8	(United States) Dallas Reunion Arena Street Circuit	(United States) R.K. Smith (United States) Lou Gigliotti (United States) Peter Cunningham	Chevrolet Corvette Chevrolet Camaro; Honda Prelude
