= 1990 SCCA Escort World Challenge =

American car race

Seasons
- ← 1989 1991 →

The 1990 SCCA Escort World Challenge season was the inaugural season of the Sports Car Club of America's World Challenge series under the sprint race format, after changing its name from the Escort Endurance Championship while keeping the corporate sponsor of Escort radar detectors. The series would also have to share attention with the SCCA's main series, Trans Am. This would be the only season to feature only two classes until 1997, between which the series would use three to five classes per season. Peter Cunningham got his first win, finishing first at Laguna Seca Raceway in a Honda CRX. This would begin a longtime relationship between Cunningham and Honda, as well as his longtime career in the series, in which he is now the best-performing driver by number of wins.

== Results ==
Round	Circuit	Winning driver (WC) Winning Driver (SP)	Winning Vehicle (WC) Winning Vehicle (SP)
1	(United States) Sears Point International Raceway	(United States) Scott Lagasse / (United States) Doc Bundy (United States) Jim Dentici	Lotus Esprit X180R Honda CRX
2	(United States) Addison Airport Circuit	(United States) R.K. Smith (United States) Bobby Archer	Chevrolet Corvette Eagle Talon
3	(United States) Laguna Seca	(United States) Doc Bundy (United States) Peter Cunningham	Lotus Esprit X180R Honda CRX
4	(United States) Des Moines Street Circuit	(United States) R.K. Smith (United States) Mitch Wright	Chevrolet Corvette Eagle Talon
5	(United States) Road Atlanta	(United States) Doc Bundy (United States) Bobby Archer	Lotus Esprit X180R Eagle Talon
6	(Canada) Toronto Street Circuit	(United States) John Heinricy (United States) Peter Cunningham	Chevrolet Corvette Honda CRX
7	(United States) Denver Street Circuit	(United States) Scott Lagasse (United States) Bobby Archer	Lotus Esprit X180R Eagle Talon
8	(United States) San Antonio Street Circuit	(United States) R.K. Smith (United States) Bobby Archer	Chevrolet Corvette Eagle Talon
