= 2010 SCCA Pro Racing World Challenge =

Seasons
- ← 2009 2011 →

The 2010 SCCA Pro Racing World Challenge was the 21st season of the SCCA Pro Racing World Challenge. It was the first season since 1998 without the sponsorship of television channel Speed.

The series returned to a combined-class race with GT, GTS, and TC racing simultaneously. The last season for combined classes was 1996, also the last year in which the series had more than two classes. There are three classes in the championship in 2010, as opposed to two in 2009. The top GT class remains the same, but the TC class has been changed to only allow more cost-effective racecars closer in spirit to the SCCA's improved touring classes. The rules were originally introduced during the 2009 season as the TC2 class within the touring car category. The cars that previously competed in the old TC class can now be run in the new "GTS" class. The new format also solves the BMW-Acura-Mazda affair that had begun thirteen years prior and had lasted almost every year since save for some competition from Saturn and Audi in some years.

In addition to the existing driver's and manufacturer's championships, 2010 saw the introduction of a team's championship, which was awarded to the team car that accumulates the most points over the course of the season, regardless of the driver.

Due to Speed no longer supporting the series, Versus broadcast all events in ninety-minute broadcasts.

The new touring cars were now comparable to the vehicles used in the Continental Tire Sports Car Challenge.

== Schedule ==
Most of the calendar was released in November 2009, with the season-ending round at Miller Motorsports Park added in January 2010.

Round	Circuit	Location	Date	Supporting
1	Streets of St. Petersburg	St. Petersburg, Florida	March 26–28	IndyCar Series
2	Streets of St. Petersburg	St. Petersburg, Florida	March 26–28	IndyCar Series
3	Long Beach	Long Beach, California	April 16–18	IndyCar Series / American Le Mans Series
4	Mosport International Raceway	Bowmanville, Ontario	May 21–23	stand-alone event
5	Mosport International Raceway	Bowmanville, Ontario	May 21–23	stand-alone event
6	Watkins Glen International	Watkins Glen, New York	July 2–4	IndyCar Series
7	Exhibition Place	Toronto, Ontario	July 17–18	IndyCar Series
8	Mid-Ohio Sports Car Course	Lexington, Ohio	August 6–8	IndyCar Series / American Le Mans Series
9	Mid-Ohio Sports Car Course	Lexington, Ohio	August 6–8	IndyCar Series / American Le Mans Series
10	Virginia International Raceway	Danville, Virginia	September 10–12	stand-alone event
11	Virginia International Raceway	Danville, Virginia	September 10–12	stand-alone event
12	Miller Motorsports Park	Tooele, Utah	October 1–3	stand-alone event

== Race results ==
Rnd	Circuit	GT Winning Car	GTS Winning Car	TC Winning Car
Rnd	Circuit	GT Winning Driver	GTS Winning Driver	TC Winning Driver
1	St. Petersburg	#6 K-Pax Racing Volvo S60	#43 RealTime Racing Acura TSX	#49 Irish Mike's Racing Volkswagen GLI
1	St. Petersburg	(United States) Randy Pobst	(United States) Peter Cunningham	(United States) Todd Buras
2	St. Petersburg	#4 Stoptech Motorsports Porsche 911 GT3	#43 RealTime Racing Acura TSX	#49 Irish Mike's Racing Volkswagen GLI
2	St. Petersburg	(United States) Dino Crescentini	(United States) Peter Cunningham	(United States) Todd Buras
3	Long Beach	#13 Dodge Motorsports Dodge Viper	#19 M&T Lotus Exige	#18 DG-Spec Scion tC
3	Long Beach	(Canada) Kuno Wittmer	(United States) Tyler McQuarrie	(United States) Robert Stout
4	Mosport	#6 K-Pax Racing Volvo S60	#35 Torvec Chevrolet Corvette	#49 Irish Mike's Racing Volkswagen GLI
4	Mosport	(United States) Randy Pobst	(United States) John Heinricy	(United States) Chip Herr
5	Mosport	#2 Carlisle Chevrolet Corvette	#35 Torvec Chevrolet Corvette	#18 DG-Spec Scion tC
5	Mosport	(Canada) Ron Fellows	(United States) John Heinricy	(United States) Robert Stout
6	Watkins Glen	#2 Carlisle Chevrolet Corvette	#43 RealTime Racing Acura TSX	#18 DG-Spec Scion tC
6	Watkins Glen	(Canada) Ron Fellows	(United States) Peter Cunningham	(United States) Robert Stout
7	Toronto	#6 K-Pax Racing Volvo S60	#43 RealTime Racing Acura TSX	#93 HPD/HondaRacing Honda Civic Si
7	Toronto	(United States) Randy Pobst	(United States) Peter Cunningham	(Canada) Nick Wittmer
8	Mid-Ohio	#2 Carlisle Chevrolet Corvette	#43 RealTime Racing Acura TSX	#20 Maxwell Paper Mazda RX-8
8	Mid-Ohio	(United States) Mike Skeen	(United States) Peter Cunningham	(United States) Ryan Eversley
9	Mid-Ohio	#14 GMG Porsche 911 GT3	#43 RealTime Racing Acura TSX	#20 Maxwell Paper Mazda RX-8
9	Mid-Ohio	(United States) James Sofronas	(United States) Peter Cunningham	(United States) Ryan Eversley
10	VIR	#6 K-Pax Racing Volvo S60	#34 Realtime Racing Acura TSX	#50 Irish Mike's Racing Volkswagen GLI
10	VIR	(United States) Randy Pobst	(United States) Nick Esayian	(United States) Todd Buras
11	VIR	#8 K-Pax Racing Volvo S60	#43 Realtime Racing Acura TSX	#18 DG-Spec Scion tC
11	VIR	(United Kingdom) Andy Pilgrim	(United States) Peter Cunningham	(United States) Robert Stout
12	Miller	#13 Dodge Motorsports Dodge Viper	#43 Realtime Racing Acura TSX	#18 DG-Spec Scion tC
12	Miller	(Canada) Kuno Wittmer	(United States) Peter Cunningham	(United States) Robert Stout

== Championships ==
=== Driver championships ===
Championship points are awarded to drivers based on qualifying and finishing positions. In addition, 5 bonus points are awarded to a driver leading a lap during a race, and 5 bonus points are awarded to the driver leading the most laps.

Position	1	2	3	4	5	6	7	8	9	10	11	12	13	14	15	16	17	18	19	20	21	22	23	24	25
Race	110	100	92	85	80	76	72	68	64	60	57	54	51	48	45	43	41	39	37	35	33	31	29	27	25
Qualifying	15	12	9	6	3	–	–	–	–	–	–	–	–	–	–	–	–	–	–	–	–	–	–	–	–

==== GT standings ====
Pos	Driver	Car	STP1	STP2	LBH	MOS1	MOS2	WGL	TOR	MOH1	MOH2	VIR1	VIR2	MIL	Total
1	(United States) Randy Pobst	Volvo S60	**1***	**14**	6	**1***	**2**	**3**	**1***	7	3	**1***	2	**3**	1296
2	(Canada) Kuno Wittmer	Dodge Viper	6	5	**1***	2	4	2	6	4	14	4	10	1*	1098
3	(United States) James Sofronas	Porsche 911 GT3	3	2	5		6	7	2	**2**	**1***	2	3	5	1052
4	(United Kingdom) Andy Pilgrim	Volvo S60	2	3	9	14	16	14	3	9	2	3	**1***	2	1044
5	(United States) Jason Daskalos	Dodge Viper	12	4	12	4	3	4	9	6	7	6	11	6	888
6	(United States) Rob Morgan	Porsche 911 GT3	8	6	8	8	8	10	7	8	8	5	5	7	838
7	(United States) Jeff Courtney	Dodge Viper	10	9	7	6	7	12	8	13	5	7	6	4	836
8	(United States) Tony Gaples	Chevrolet Corvette	9	10	10	7	11	8	10	15	6	8	7	12	759
9	(United States) Dino Crescentini	Porsche 911 GT3	14	1*	2	5	15	6	5	5	15				723
10	(United States) Patrick Lindsay	Porsche 911 GT3	4	15	19	3	5	5	4	3	4	DNS			711
11	(Canada) Fred Roberts (R)	Dodge Viper	13	13	16	9	9	11	12	10	12	9	8	8	684
12	(United States) William Ziegler	Porsche 911 GT3	16	12	11	12	14	13	13	12	10	10	9	10	653
13	(United States) Charles Morgan	Porsche 911 GT3	11	11	13	11	10	9	11	11	13				508
14	(Canada) Ron Fellows	Chevrolet Corvette			18		1*	1*							303
15	(United States) Tony Rivera	Nissan GT-R	7	8	21	10	12								284
16	(United States) Steve Ott (R)	Nissan GT-R	15	16	20	13	13								222
17	(United States) Mike Skeen (R)	Chevrolet Corvette								1*	9				196
18	(United States) Robert Prilika	Porsche 911 GT3	5	7										11	162
19	(United States) Brian Kubinski	Chevrolet Corvette	5	7											152
20	(United States) Jeff Altenburg	Porsche 911 GT3										11	4		142
21	(United States) Tomy Drissi	Ford Mustang			14							12	DNS		102
22	(United States) Brandon Davis	Ford Mustang			3										101
23	(United States) Boris Said	Ford Mustang			4										88
24=	(United States) Brent Holden (R)	Porsche 911 GT3			15										45
24=	(United States) Scott Bove	Porsche 911 GT3				15									45
26	(United States) Nick Mancuso (R)	Aston Martin DBRS9			17										41

==== GTS standings ====
Pos	Driver	Car	STP1	STP2	LBH	MOS1	MOS2	WGL	TOR	MOH1	MOH2	VIR1	VIR2	MIL	Total
1	(United States) Peter Cunningham	Acura TSX	**1***	**1***	6	**3**	3	**1***	**1***	**1***	**1***	**4***	**1***	**1**	1466
2	(United States) Nick Esayian	Acura TSX	3	3	2	4	4	2	3	2	2	1	2	4	1252
3	(United States) Ernie Jakubowski (R)	Porsche Cayman S						3	2	10	3	DSQ	3	13	535
4	(United States) Kevin Helms (R)	Honda Civic Si	6	4						4	8	2	4		526
5	(United States) Tyler McQuarrie (R)	Lotus Exige S			**1***	2	**2**								359
6	(United States) Ben Crosland (R)	Ford Mustang FR500S								5	4			2*	293
7	(United States) Michael Pettiford	Chevrolet Corvette	4	5	3										275
8	(United States) Tommy Sadler	Acura TSX			DNS			4				3	5		266
9	(United States) John Heinricy	Chevrolet Corvette				1*	1*								264
10	(United States) George Winkler (R)	Ford Mustang FR500S								9	6			3	241
11	(United States) Ricardo Colinello	Ford Mustang FR500S								6	7			8	216
12	(United States) Brandon Davis	Acura TSX	2	2											200
13	(United States) Brad Adams (R)	Ford Mustang FR500S								7	10			9	196
14	(United States) Devin Cates (R)	Ford Mustang FR500S								3	5				165
15	(United States) Tom Lepper (R)	Pontiac Solstice GXP	5	6											162
16	(United States) Gary Savage (R)	Ford Mustang FR500S								8	9				132
17	(United States) Charles Espenlaub	Mazda3			4										85
18	(United States) Gary Tolar (R)	Porsche 996			5										83
19	(United States) Stan Wilson	Dodge Neon SRT										5			80
20	(United States) Pratt Cole (R)	Ford Mustang FR500S												6	76
21	(United States) Scott Kuhne (R)	Pontiac Solstice GXP			7										72
22	(United States) Karl Poeltl (R)	BMW 325i E46										DNS		10	69
23	(United States) Kevin Marshall (R)	Lotus Exige S			8										68
24	(United States) Kyle Kelley (R)	Chevrolet Corvette												11	60
25	(United States) Paul Dagis (R)	BMW M3				DNS									3
26=	(United States) Dale Laakso (R)	Acura RSX			DNS										0
26=	(United States) Fabryce Kutyba	BMW M3 E46												DNS	0

==== TC standings ====
Pos	Driver	Car	STP1	STP2	LBH	MOS1	MOS2	WGL	TOR	MOH1	MOH2	VIR1	VIR2	MIL	Total
1	(United States) Robert Stout (R)	Scion tC	2	2	1*	**4***	1	1*	3	4	10	2	1	1*	1317
2	(United States) Eric Meyer (R)	Mazda RX-8	5	5	2	3	5	**7**	2	3	8	16	14	3	1022
3	(United States) Brett Sandberg (R)	Acura TSX	4	7		7	7	4	10	6	13	3	6		740
4	(United States) Robb Holland	Volkswagen Golf GTI				5	3		6	12	15	4	2	10	619
5	(United States) Dan Gardner (R)	Scion tC	3	4	5			2	8	10	3				595
6	(United States) Shea Holbrook (R)	Honda Civic Si	6	6		DNS		8	5	8	6	9	15		553
7	(United States) Michael Pettiford	Volkswagen Jetta GLI							4	7	14	8	3	6	441
8	(United States) Don Istook	Audi				6	8	6	7			10	7		428
9	(United States) Todd Buras (R)	Volkswagen Jetta GLI	1*	1*								**1***	DSQ		414
10	(Canada) Nick Wittmer	Honda Civic Si			**3**				**1***	5	9				392
11	(United States) Greg Shaffer (R)	Volkswagen Jetta GLI				9	4		9			5	13		377
12	(United States) Charlie Soloman (R)	Mazda RX-8				8	9			DSQ	5	12	5		346
13	(United States) Carolyn Kujala (R)	Mazda RX-8								11	11	13	10	8	293
14	(United States) Tom Lepper (R)	Scion tC				2	6							4	276
15	(United States) Ryan Eversley (R)	Mazda RX-8								1*	1*				249
16	(United States) Chip Herr	Volkswagen Jetta GLI				1	2*								246
17	(United States) Jason Saini	Mazdaspeed3								**2**	**2**				224
18	(United States) Branden Peterson	Honda Civic Si									12		4	5	219
19	(United States) Jeff Mosing (R)	Mazda RX-8								13	7			7	210
20	(United States) David Tuaty	Honda Civic Si								14	4		8		201
21	(United States) Mark Hein	Honda Civic Si	**7**	**3**											199
22	(United States) Colin Cohen (R)	Volkswagen Golf GTI						6				14	9		188
23	(Russia) Alexander Lvov	Volkswagen Golf GTI	8	DNS				3							175
24	(United States) Devin Cates (R)	Volkswagen Golf GTI										6	12		139
25	(United States) Tony Wedderburn (R)	Chevrolet Cobalt	9	8											132
26	(United States) Alex Ratcliffe (R)	Lexus IS300						9					11		121
27	(United States) Pierre Kleinubing	Mazdaspeed3												2	106
28	(United States) Tommy Chen (R)	Mazda RX-8			4										88
29	(Canada) Taylor Hacquard	Mazdaspeed3												**9**	84
30	(United States) Carl Hober	Honda Civic Si										7			72
31	(United States) Bob Roth (R)	Honda Civic Si								9					64
32	(United States) Tristan Herbert (R)	Lexus IS300										11			57
33	(United States) Jose Armengol (R)	Honda Civic Si										15			45

=== Manufacturer championships ===
Manufacturer points are awarded according to the highest-finishing car from that manufacturer. Only manufacturers that are SCCA Pro Racing corporate members receive points. Points are awarded on the following basis:

Position	1	2	3	4	5	6
Points	9	7	5	3	2	1

In addition, one bonus point is awarded to the pole-winning manufacturer. In the table below, the manufacturer's top finishing position is shown, with pole winner in bold.

==== GT standings ====
Pos	Manufacturer	STP1	STP2	LBH	MOS1	MOS2	WGL	TOR	MOH1	MOH2	VIR1	VIR2	MIL	Total
1	(Sweden) Volvo	**1**	**3**	6	**1**	**2**	**3**	**1**	7	2	**1**	**1**	**2**	85
2	(Germany) Porsche	3	1	2	3	5	5	2	**2**	**1**	2	2	5	68
3	(United States) Dodge	6	4	**1**	2	3	2	6	4	5	4	4	1	52
4	(Japan) Nissan	7	8	20	10	12								0

==== GTS standings ====
Pos	Manufacturer	STP1	STP2	LBH	MOS1	MOS2	WGL	TOR	MOH1	MOH2	VIR1	VIR2	MIL	Total
1	(Japan) Acura	**1**	**1**	2	**3**	3	**1**	**1**	**1**	**1**	**1**	**1**	**1**	111
2	(Germany) Porsche			5			3	2	10	3	5	3	13	24

==== TC standings ====
Pos	Manufacturer	STP1	STP2	LBH	MOS1	MOS2	WGL	TOR	MOH1	MOH2	VIR1	VIR2	MIL	Total
1	(Japan) Scion	2	2	1	**2**	1	1	3	4	3	2	1	1	87
2	(Germany) Volkswagen	1	1		1	**2**		4	7	11	**1**	**2**	6	57
3	(Japan) Mazda	5	5	2	3	5	**7**	2	**1**	**1**	12	5	2	56
4	(Japan) Honda	**7**	**3**	**3**	10		3	**1**	5	4	7	4	5	38
