= 1992 SCCA Pro Racing World Challenge =

Seasons
- ← 1991 1993 →

The 1992 SCCA Pro Racing World Challenge was the third running of the Sports Car Club of America's World Challenge series. It was the first not to be sponsored by Escort radar detectors. The series would not receive another corporate sponsor until its acquisition by SpeedVision in 1999. It included a 24-hour race at Mosport Park. It would be the final year with four or more groups until 1996. The season would also mark the end of the endurance racing the series was founded upon, gradually phased out until by 1999 its endurance races were replaced with one-hour sprints. The classes were changed from World Challenge, Super Production, and Super Sport to A, B, C, and D.

== Results ==
Round	Circuit	Winning driver (A) Winning Driver (B) Winning Driver (C) Winning Driver (D)	Winning Vehicle (A) Winning Vehicle (B) Winning Vehicle (C) Winning Vehicle (D)
1	(United States) Firebird Motorsports Park	(United States) Shawn Hendricks (United States) Lou Gigliotti (United States) Ron Emmick (United States) Neil Hannemann	Chevrolet Corvette Chevrolet Camaro; Oldsmobile Achieva; Eagle Talon
2	(United States) Des Moines Street Circuit	(United States) R.K. Smith (United States) Tom Benua (United States) Dave Jolly (United States) Bill Saunders	Chevrolet Corvette Eagle Talon; Oldsmobile Achieva; Eagle Talon
3	(United States) Watkins Glen International	(United States) Bill Cooper (United States) Lou Gigliotti (United States) Dave Jolly (United States) Bill Saunders	Chevrolet Corvette Chevrolet Camaro; Oldsmobile Achieva; Eagle Talon
4	(United States) Lime Rock Park	(United States) Kim Baker (United States) Lou Gigliotti (United States) Dave Jolly (United States) Neil Hannemann	Chevrolet Corvette Chevrolet Camaro; Oldsmobile Achieva; Eagle Talon
5	(United States) Cleveland Burke Lakefront Airport Circuit	(United States) R.K. Smith (United States) Lou Gigliotti (United States) Norris Rancourt (United States) Bill Saunders	Chevrolet Corvette Chevrolet Camaro; Honda Prelude; Eagle Talon
6	(Canada) Mosport	(United States) Kim Baker / (United States) Ray Kong / (Canada) Peter Hanson / (United States) Jim Minneker / (United States) Don Knowles (United States) Chris Neville / (United States) Doug Goad / (United States) Dave Murry (United States) Taz Harvey / (Canada) Ron Lauzon / (United States) Jim Dentici (United States) Bill Saunders/ (United States) Beaver Theodosakis / (United States) Mitch Wright / (United Kingdom) Andy Pilgrim / (United States) Neil Hannemann	Chevrolet Corvette Chevrolet Camaro; Honda Prelude; Eagle Talon
7	(United States) Road America	(United States) Bill Cooper (United States) Lou Gigliotti (United States) Randy Pobst (United States) Bill Saunders	Chevrolet Corvette Chevrolet Camaro; Honda Prelude; Eagle Talon
8	(United States) Sears Point International Raceway	(United States) R.K. Smith (United States) Lou Gigliotti (United States) John Green (United States) Neil Hannemann	Chevrolet Corvette Chevrolet Camaro; Honda Prelude; Eagle Talon
