= 1999 SpeedVision World Challenge =

Seasons
- ← 1998 2000 →

The 1999 SpeedVision World Challenge was the tenth running of the Sports Car Club of America's premier series. It was the first season that the series would be covered by the SpeedVision network. The season also marked a new format, with Touring 1 becoming Grand Touring and Touring 2 becoming Touring Car. 1999 was also the first year in which the series would have a corporate sponsor since 1991. Pontiac got its final series win this season, joining Oldsmobile and Saturn as General Motors brands gradually disappearing from the World Challenge. It was not until the rise of the Cadillac CTS-V that a GM division other than Chevrolet would see a win. This also led to the beginning of a longtime BMW-Mazda-Acura affair in touring car.

== Results ==
Round	Circuit	Winning driver (GT) Winning Driver (TC)	Winning Vehicle (GT) Winning Vehicle (TC)
1	Mosport	(United States) Bobby Archer (United States) Michael Galati	Dodge Viper Acura Integra R
2	Lime Rock	(United States) Bobby Archer (United States) Michael Galati	Dodge Viper Acura Integra R
3	Mid-Ohio	(United States) Peter Kitchak (United States) Michael Galati	Porsche 911 RSR Acura Integra R
4	Road Atlanta	(United States) Kermit Upton III (United States) Michael Galati	BMW M3 Acura Integra R
5	Tros-Rivieres	(United States) Peter Kitchak (Brazil) Pierre Kleinubing	Porsche 911 RSR Acura Integra R
6	West Michigan	(United States) Peter Kitchak (United States) Will Turner	Porsche 911 RSR BMW 328
7	Vancouver	(United States) Scotty White (United States) Hugh Plumb	Chevrolet Corvette C5 Acura Integra R
8	Pike's Peak	(United States) Peter Kitchak (United States) Chuck Hemmingson	Porsche 911 RSR Pontiac Sunfire
9	Laguna Seca	(United States) John Heinricy (Brazil) Pierre Kleinubing	Chevrolet Corvette C5 Acura Integra R
