= 2009 Speed World Challenge =

Seasons
- ← 2008 2010 →

The 2009 SCCA Speed World Challenge was the 20th Speed World Challenge season. began March 18, 2009, and was completed on October 11, after 10 rounds. The Grand Touring championship was won by Brandon Davis driving a Ford Mustang GT, and the Touring Car championship was won by Pierre Kleinubing driving an Acura TSX. It was the last season under the Speed Channel sponsorship.

== Schedule ==
Five of the rounds were held as an undercard to the American Le Mans Series: Sebring, Long Beach, Mid-Ohio, Road America, Road Atlanta and Laguna Seca. The Sebring, Mid-Ohio, Road Atlanta and Laguna Seca races were also shared with the Atlantic Championship, as well as the Autobahn date. The race at New Jersey was held as an undercard to the Grand-Am Rolex Sports Car Series.

Round	Date	Location	Classes	
1	March 20	Sebring	GT	TC
2	April 19	Long Beach	GT	
3	May 3	New Jersey	GT	TC
4	May 17	Mosport	GT	TC
5	July 5	Watkins Glen	GT	TC
6	July 26	Autobahn Country Club	GT	TC
7	August 9	Mid Ohio	GT	TC
8	August 16	Road America	GT	TC
9	September 25	Road Atlanta	GT	TC
10	October 11	Laguna Seca	GT	TC

== Race results ==
Rnd	Circuit	GT Winning Car	TC Winning Car
Rnd	Circuit	GT Winning Driver	TC Winning Driver
1	Sebring	#97 Tax Masters Porsche 911 GT3	#38 Bimmer World BMW 328i
1	Sebring	(United States) Tony Rivera	(United States) Seth Thomas
2	Long Beach	#14 Global Motorsports Group Porsche 911 GT3	no race
2	Long Beach	(United States) James Sofronas	no race
3	New Jersey	#8 K-Pax Racing Volvo S60	#74 Mazdaspeed Mazda 6
3	New Jersey	(United Kingdom) Andy Pilgrim	(United States) Jason Saini
4	Mosport	#5 Daskalos Developments Dodge Viper	#44 RealTime Racing Acura TSX
4	Mosport	(United States) Jason Daskalos	(Canada) Kuno Wittmer
4	Mosport	no race	#1 RealTime Racing Acura TSX
4	Mosport	no race	(United States) Peter Cunningham
5	Watkins Glen	#4 Stoptech Motorsports Porsche 911 GT3	#38 Bimmer World BMW 328i
5	Watkins Glen	(United States) Dino Crescentini	(United States) Seth Thomas
6	Autobahn	#1 K-Pax Racing Volvo S60	#74 Mazdaspeed Mazda 6
6	Autobahn	(United States) Randy Pobst	(United States) Jason Saini
7	Mid-Ohio	#10 SunMicro Ford Mustang GT	#74 Mazdaspeed Mazda 6
7	Mid-Ohio	(United States) Brandon Davis	(United States) Jason Saini
8	Road America	#97 Tax Masters Porsche 911 GT3	#42 RealTime Racing Acura TSX
8	Road America	(United States) Tony Rivera	(Brazil) Pierre Kleinubing
9	Road Atlanta	#8 K-Pax Racing Volvo S60	#38 Bimmer World BMW 328i
9	Road Atlanta	(United Kingdom) Andy Pilgrim	(United States) Seth Thomas
10	Monterey	#14 Global Motorsports Group Porsche 911 GT3	#42 RealTime Racing Acura TSX
10	Monterey	(United States) James Sofronas	(Brazil) Pierre Kleinubing

=== Drivers ===
==== Grand Touring (top 15) ====
Pos	Driver	SEB	LB	NJ	MOS	WGI	ABC	MID	ELK	ATL	LAG	Points
1	(United States) Brandon Davis	3	3	3	**2**	**8**	2	**1**	4	3	4	1012
2	(United States) James Sofronas	5	1	6	9	3	**6**	3	**15**	5	1	931
3	(United States) Tony Rivera	1	7	5	3	7	5	2	1	4	17	910
4	(United Kingdom) Andy Pilgrim	12	6	**1**	4	5	4	15	16	1	5	851
5	(United States) Eric Curran	2	2	DSQ	5	2	17	16	2	2	3	811
6	(United States) Randy Pobst	DNS	**8**	2	8	4	1	4	6	**19**	2	796
7	(United States) Dino Crescentini	**17**	DNS		6	1	15	5	3	9	18	578
8	(United States) Sonny Whelen	11	22	8	7	10	11	10	9	18	9	572
9	(United States) Tony Gaples	4	9	7	12		19	8	10	8	10	568
10	(United States) William Ziegler	8	12	11	13	11	10	11	11	12	19	552
11	(United States) Gunter Schaldach	DSQ	DNS	4	10	9	18	9	17	14	6	457
12	(United States) Jeff Courtney	DSQ	10		11		8	6	13	7	11	441
13	(United States) Jason Daskalos	19	5		1	6			5			402
14	(United States) Rob Morgan	13	15				7			13	7	291
15	(United States) Ritch Marziale	18	14					12	8			209
Pos	Driver	SEB	LB	NJ	MOS	WGI	ABC	MID	ELK	ATL	LAG	Points

**Bold** – Pole
Italics – Led Most Laps

==== Touring Car (top 15) ====
Pos	Driver	SEB	NJ	MOS	MOS	WGI	ABC	MID	ELK	ATL	LAG	Points
1	(Brazil) Pierre Kleinubing	**2**	5	2	5	6	3	3	1	10	**1**	973
2	(United States) Jason Saini	3	1	4	3	8	**1**	1	4	8	8	960
3	(United States) Peter Cunningham	9	2	5	1	5	2	2	6	6	2	921
4	(United States) Seth Thomas	1	14	10	4	**1**	11	4	8	1	7	878
5	(United States) Charles Espenlaub	12	11	7	2	2	4	**8**	**2**	9	6	847
6	(Canada) Kuno Wittmer	13	**4**	1	6	7	8	7	10	4	18	803
7	(United States) Eric Foss	4	6	**6**	**9**	11	6	9	5	5	12	769
8	(United States) James Clay	6	7	9	11	9	5	12	7	**2**	3	767
9	(United States) Nick Esayian	5	9	11	8	4	7	6	11	3	4	758
10	(United States) Patrick Lindsey							5	3	7	10	328
11	(United States) Toby Grahovec	11	8	8	10	10						313
12	(United States) Andrew Aquilante	8	3			3	12					309
13	(United States) Branden Peterson							10	12	13		165
14	(Canada) Nick Wittmer			3	7							164
15	(United States) Chip Herr	14									5	131
Pos	Driver	SEB	NJ	MOS	MOS	WGI	ABC	MID	ELK	ATL	LAG	Points

**Bold** – Pole
Italics – Led Most Laps

=== Manufacturer ===
==== Grand Touring ====
Pos	Manufacturer	SEB	LB	NJ	MOS	WGI	ABC	MID	ELK	ATL	LAG	Points
1	(Germany) Porsche	1	1	5	3	1	5	2	1	4	1	67
2	(United States) Ford	3	3	3	2	8	2	1	4	3	4	53
3	(Sweden) Volvo	12	6	1	4	4	1	4	6	1	2	48
4	(United States) Chevrolet	2	2	7	5	2	11	8	2	2	3	45
5	(United States) Dodge	7	5	4	1	6	8	6	5	7	8	18
Pos	Manufacturer	SEB	LB	NJ	MOS	WGI	ABC	MID	ELK	ATL	LAG	Points

==== Touring Car ====
Pos	Manufacturer	SEB	NJ	MOS	MOS	WGI	ABC	MID	ELK	ATL	LAG	Points
1	(Japan) Acura	2	2	1	1	5	2	2	1	4	1	72
2	(Japan) Mazda	3	1	4	2	2	1	1	2	5	5	65
3	(Germany) BMW	1	7	9	4	1	5	4	7	1	3	42
Pos	Manufacturer	SEB	NJ	MOS	MOS	WGI	ABC	MID	ELK	ATL	LAG	Points
