= 2003 Speed World Challenge =

Seasons
- ← 2002 2004 →

The 2003 Speed World Challenge season was the 14th season of the Sports Car Club of America's World Challenge series. The series' title sponsor was television network Speed Channel, who televised all the races. Championships were awarded for grand touring and touring cars. It began on March 14 and ran for ten rounds. Randy Pobst and Audi won the championships in GT, and Bill Auberlen and BMW won in Touring Car. The series would head to Puerto Rico for 2003, their first race outside of North America (i.e. the United States and Canada) since 1991 when they went to Mexico.

== Schedule ==
Rnd		Date	Circuit	Supporting	Distance	GT Winning Car	TC Winning Car
GT	TC	Date	Circuit	Supporting	Distance	GT Winning Driver	TC Winning Driver
1	1	March 14	(United States) Sebring International Raceway, Sebring, Florida	American Le Mans Series (12 Hours of Sebring)	63 mi (101 km) (TC); 67 mi (108 km) (GT)	Chevrolet Corvette Z06	BMW 325i
1	1	March 14	(United States) Sebring International Raceway, Sebring, Florida	American Le Mans Series (12 Hours of Sebring)	63 mi (101 km) (TC); 67 mi (108 km) (GT)	(United States) Phil McClure	(United States) Bill Auberlen
2	2	May 17; May 18	(Canada) Mosport International Raceway, Bowmanville, Ontario	Stand-alone event (with Trans-Am Series)	69 mi (111 km) (TC); 73 mi (117 km) (GT)	Chevrolet Corvette Z06	Acura RSX Type-S
2	2	May 17; May 18	(Canada) Mosport International Raceway, Bowmanville, Ontario	Stand-alone event (with Trans-Am Series)	69 mi (111 km) (TC); 73 mi (117 km) (GT)	(United States) Phil McClure	(Brazil) Pierre Kleinubing
3		May 24	(United States) Lime Rock Park, Lakeville, Connecticut	Stand-alone event (with Trans-Am Series)	64 mi (103 km) (GT)	BMW M3	did not participate
3		May 24	(United States) Lime Rock Park, Lakeville, Connecticut	Stand-alone event (with Trans-Am Series)	64 mi (103 km) (GT)	(United States) Bill Auberlen	did not participate
4	3	May 26	(United States) Lime Rock Park, Lakeville, Connecticut	Stand-alone event (with Trans-Am Series)	58 mi (93 km) (TC); 61 mi (98 km) (GT)	BMW M3	Acura RSX Type-S
4	3	May 26	(United States) Lime Rock Park, Lakeville, Connecticut	Stand-alone event (with Trans-Am Series)	58 mi (93 km) (TC); 61 mi (98 km) (GT)	(United States) Bill Auberlen	(Brazil) Pierre Kleinubing
5	4	June 29; June 28	(United States) Road Atlanta, Braselton, Georgia	American Le Mans Series (Grand Prix of Atlanta)	64 mi (103 km) (TC); 69 mi (111 km) (GT)	Porsche 911 Cup	BMW 325i
5	4	June 29; June 28	(United States) Road Atlanta, Braselton, Georgia	American Le Mans Series (Grand Prix of Atlanta)	64 mi (103 km) (TC); 69 mi (111 km) (GT)	(United States) Mike Fitzgerald	(United States) Bill Auberlen
6	7	July 27	(United States) Infineon Raceway, Sonoma, California	American Le Mans Series (Grand Prix of Sonoma)	58 mi (93 km) (TC); 63 mi (101 km) (GT)	BMW M3	BMW 325i
6	7	July 27	(United States) Infineon Raceway, Sonoma, California	American Le Mans Series (Grand Prix of Sonoma)	58 mi (93 km) (TC); 63 mi (101 km) (GT)	(United States) Bill Auberlen	(United States) Bill Auberlen
7		August 3	(United States) Road America, Elkhart Lake, Wisconsin	Champ Car World Series (Mario Andretti Grand Prix)	73 mi (117 km) (GT)	Porsche 911 Cup	did not participate
7		August 3	(United States) Road America, Elkhart Lake, Wisconsin	Champ Car World Series (Mario Andretti Grand Prix)	73 mi (117 km) (GT)	(United States) Mike Fitzgerald	did not participate
	6	August 10	(United States) Mid-Ohio Sports Car Course, Lexington, Ohio	Champ Car World Series (Grand Prix of Mid-Ohio)	59 mi (95 km) (TC)	did not participate	Acura RSX Type-S
	6	August 10	(United States) Mid-Ohio Sports Car Course, Lexington, Ohio	Champ Car World Series (Grand Prix of Mid-Ohio)	59 mi (95 km) (TC)	did not participate	(United States) Bob Endicott
	7	August 23	(United States) Road America, Elkhart Lake, Wisconsin	American Le Mans Series (Road America 500)	69 mi (111 km) (TC)	did not participate	Nissan Sentra SE-R
	7	August 23	(United States) Road America, Elkhart Lake, Wisconsin	American Le Mans Series (Road America 500)	69 mi (111 km) (TC)	did not participate	(United States) Peter Cunningham
8	8	September 6 September 7	(United States) Mazda Raceway Laguna Seca, Monterey, California	American Le Mans Series (Monterey Sports Car Championships)	58 mi (93 km) (TC); 63 mi (101 km) (GT)	Dodge Viper	Mazda Protege ES
8	8	September 6 September 7	(United States) Mazda Raceway Laguna Seca, Monterey, California	American Le Mans Series (Monterey Sports Car Championships)	58 mi (93 km) (TC); 63 mi (101 km) (GT)	(United States) Paul Mumford	(United States) Jeff Altenburg
9	9	October 17	(United States) Road Atlanta, Braselton, Georgia	American Le Mans Series (Petit Le Mans)	64 mi (103 km) (TC); 69 mi (111 km) (GT)	Audi RS6	Acura RSX Type-S
9	9	October 17	(United States) Road Atlanta, Braselton, Georgia	American Le Mans Series (Petit Le Mans)	64 mi (103 km) (TC); 69 mi (111 km) (GT)	(United States) Randy Pobst	(Brazil) Pierre Kleinubing
10	10	October 26	Isla Grande Airport, San Juan, Puerto Rico	Stand-alone event (with Trans-Am Series)	50 mi (80 km) (TC); 58 mi (93 km) (GT)	Audi RS6	BMW 325i
10	10	October 26	Isla Grande Airport, San Juan, Puerto Rico	Stand-alone event (with Trans-Am Series)	50 mi (80 km) (TC); 58 mi (93 km) (GT)	(United States) Randy Pobst	(United States) Bill Auberlen
