= 2001 SpeedVision World Challenge =

Seasons
- ← 2000 2002 →

The 2001 SpeedVision World Challenge was the 12th running of the Sports Car Club of America's premier series.

== Results ==
Round	Circuit	Winning driver (GT) Winning Driver (TC)	Winning Vehicle (GT) Winning Vehicle (TC)
1	Texas	(United States) Michael Galati (United States) Steve Pfeffer	Audi S4 BMW 328is
2	Sebring	(United States) Peter Cunningham (Brazil) Pierre Kleinubing	Acura NSX Acura Integra R
3	Mosport Park	(United States) Peter Cunningham (Brazil) Pierre Kleinubing (both races)	Acura NSX Acura Integra R
4	Detroit	(United States) Peter Cunningham Did not participate	Acura NSX Did not participate
5	Sears Point	(United States) Johannes van Overbeek (United States) Neal Sapp	Porsche 911 GT3 Cup BMW 325is
6	Portland	(United States) Michael Galati (United States) Neal Sapp	Audi S4 BMW 325is
7	Laguna Seca	(United States) Peter Cunningham (United States) Roger Foo	Acura NSX Honda Civic Si
8	Road Atlanta	(United States) Michael Galati / (United States) Peter Cunningham (United States) Neal Sapp (both races)	Audi S4 / Acura NSX BMW 325is
