= 1995 SCCA Pro Racing World Challenge =

Seasons
- ← 1994 1996 →

The 1995 SCCA Pro Racing World Challenge season was the sixth running of the Sports Car Club of America's World Challenge series. The season marked the start of a long reign of Honda in the touring car classes. The classes were changed from World Challenge, Touring Car, and Super Production to Sport, Touring, and Super Production.

== Results ==
Round	Circuit	Winning driver (S) Winning Driver (T) Winning Driver (SP)	Winning Vehicle (S) Winning Vehicle (T) Winning Vehicle (SP)
1	Phoenix	(United States) John Heinricy (United States) Neil Hanneman (United States) Paul Booher	Chevrolet Corvette Eagle Talon; Saturn SC
2	Mosport	(United States) David Murry (United States) Lou Gigliotti (United States) Dave Jolly	Porsche 911 GT Chevrolet Camaro; Oldsmobile Achieva
3	Lime Rock	(United States) David Murry (United States) Kermit Upton III (United States) Dave Jolly	Porsche 911 GT BMW M3; Oldsmobile Achieva
4	Road America	(United States) David Murry (United States) Willy Lewis (United States) Peter Schwartzott	Porsche 911 GT Eagle Talon; Honda Prelude Si
5	Tros-Rivieres	(United States) David Murry (United States) Willy Lewis (United States) Peter Cunningham	Porsche 911 GT Eagle Talon; Honda Prelude
6	Road Atlanta	(United States) John Heinricy / (United States) David Murry (United States) Neil Hannemann / (United States) Kermit Upton III (United States) Paul Booher / (United States) Ron Emmick	Chevrolet Corvette / Porsche 911 GT Eagle Talon / BMW M3; Saturn SC / Oldsmobile Achieva
7	Sears Point	(United States) Price Cobb (United States) Kermit Upton III (United States) Terry Borcheller	Ford Mustang BMW M3; BMW M3
