= 1996 SCCA Pro Racing World Challenge =

Seasons
- ← 1995 1997 →

The 1996 SCCA Pro Racing World Challenge season was the seventh running of the Sports Car Club of America's World Challenge series. It was the final season before a thirteen-year-long rivalry in touring car between BMW, Mazda, and Acura. This was ended in 2010 with the adoption of a new touring car class, moving the older touring cars to a new "GTS" group. It was also the final combined class year until 2010. This was also the final season with more than two classes until 2010. It was the first season with more than three classes since 1992. Eagle got its final wins after being a major competitor in the series since the beginning. The brand was discontinued only a few years later. Also getting its final wins was the Oldsmobile brand, having also been competitive for several years. A notable entry was the Mosler Intruder, a supercar which was never seen again after 1996.

All but the final two races had S1, S2, T1, and T2 groups (S for sport and T for touring). For the races at Reno and Sears Point, a "GTA" group was added.

== Results ==
Round	Circuit	Winning driver (S1) Winning Driver (S2) Winning Driver (T1) Winning Driver (T2) Winning Driver (GTA)	Winning Vehicle (S1) Winning Vehicle (S2) Winning Vehicle (T1) Winning Vehicle (T2) Winning Vehicle (GTA)
1	St. Petersburg	Did not participate (Italy) Almo Coppelli; Did not participate (United States) Alain Chebeir; Did not participate	Did not participate Callaway Corvette; Did not participate BMW 325is Did not participate
2	Phoenix	Did not participate (United States) Willy Lewis; Did not participate (United States) Charlie Downes; Did not participate	Did not participate Eagle Talon; Did not participate BMW M3; Did not participate
3	Mosport	Did not participate (United States) Kermit Upton III (Italy) Aldo Coppelli (United States) Charlie Downes; Did not participate	Did not participate BMW M3; Callaway Corvette; BMW M3; Did not participate
4	Lime Rock	Did not participate (United States) Boris Said III (Italy) Aldo Coppelli (United States) Paul Booher; Did not participate	Did not participate Callaway Corvette; Ford Mustang; Saturn SC; Did not participate
5	Minneapolis	Did not participate (United States) Greg Theiss (United States) Shane Lewis (United States) Chuck Hemmingson; Did not participate	Did not participate Eagle Talon; Mosler Intruder; Oldsmobile Achieva; Did not participate
6	Texas	Did not participate (United States) Greg Theiss; Did not participate (United States) Michael Galati; Did not participate	Did not participate Eagle Talon; Did not participate Honda Prelude; Did not participate
7	Tros-Rivieres	Did not participate (United States) Lou Gigliotti (United States) Shane Lewis; Did not participate Did not participate	Did not participate Saleen Mustang; Mosler Intruder; Did not participate Did not participate
8	Watkins Glen	(United States) Martin Snow (United States) Lou Gigliotti (United States) Steve Saleen (United States) Peter Schwartzott; Did not participate	Porsche 911 GT2 Saleen Mustang; Saleen Mustang; Honda Prelude; Did not participate
9	Reno	(United Kingdom) Andy Pilgrim (United States) Peter Cunningham (United States) Rob Rizzo (United States) Michael Galati (United States) Vic Rice	Porsche 911 GT2 Acura NSX; Saleen Mustang; Honda Prelude; Pontiac Grand Prix
10	Sears Point	(United States) Melanie Snow (United States) Peter Cunningham (United States) Shane Lewis (United States) Paul Booher (United States) Vic Rice	Mosler Intruder Acura NSX; Mosler Intruder; Saturn SC; Pontiac Grand Prix
