= 2007 Speed World Challenge =

2007 Speed World Challenge season

Seasons
- ← 2006 2008 →

The 2007 Speed World Challenge season was the 18th season of the SCCA Pro Racing Speed World Challenge. It began on March 16 at Sebring International Raceway and ended October 21 at Mazda Raceway Laguna Seca.

== Schedule ==
| Date | Location | Classes | |
|---|---|---|---|
| March 16 | Sebring | GT | TC |
| April 15 | Long Beach | GT | |
| May 19 | Miller | GT | TC |
| May 24 | Charlotte | GT | |
| May 28 | Lime Rock | | TC |
| June 10 | Watkins Glen | GT | TC |
| June 10 | Watkins Glen | | TC |
| July 8 | Exhibition Place | GT | TC |
| July 22 | Mid Ohio | GT | TC |
| August 26 | Mosport | GT | TC |
| October 5 | Road Atlanta | GT | TC |
| October 21 | Laguna Seca | GT | TC |

== Results ==
| Round | Circuit | Winning driver (GT) Winning Driver (TC) | Winning Vehicle (GT) Winning Vehicle (TC) |
|---|---|---|---|
| 1 | Sebring | (United States) Eric Curran (United States) Jeff Altenburg | Chevrolet Corvette Mazda6 |
| 2 | Long Beach | (United States) Eric Curran Did not participate | Chevrolet Corvette Did not participate |
| 3 | Miller | (United States) Tommy Archer (United States) Jeff Altenburg | Dodge Viper Mazda6 |
| 4 | Lowe's Motor Speedway | (United Kingdom) Andy Pilgrim Did not participate | Cadillac CTS-V Did not participate |
| 5 | Lime Rock | (United States) Chip Herr Did not participate | Audi A4 Did not participate |
| 6 | Watkins Glen | (United States) Randy Pobst (United States) Randy Pobst (both races) | Porsche 911 GT3 Mazda6 |
| 7 | Toronto | (United States) Randy Pobst (United States) Peter Cunningham | Porsche 911 GT3 Acurs TSX |
| 8 | Mid Ohio | (United States) Eric Curran (United States) Joey Hand | Chevrolet Corvette BMW 325i |
| 9 | Mosport | (United States) Eric Curran (United States) Adam Pecorari | Chevrolet Corvette Audi A4 |
| 10 | Road Atlanta | (United States) Lawson Aschenbach (United States) Michael Galati | Cadillac CTS-V Mazda6 |
| 11 | Laguna Seca | (United Kingdom) Andy Pilgrim (United States) Peter Cunningham | Cadillac CTS-V Acura TSX |
