= 1998 SCCA Pro Racing World Challenge =

Seasons
- ← 1997 1999 →

The 1998 SCCA Pro Racing World Challenge was the ninth running of the Sports Car Club of America's World Challenge series. It was the final year before SpeedVision purchased the series, thus giving the World Challenge a TV contract. This led to the series' popularity growing and ultimately surpassing that of the Trans Am Series. 1998 was the final year of the T1/T2 format, as Speed reformatted the classes into GT and TC.

== Results ==
Round	Circuit	Winning driver (T1) Winning driver (T2)	Winning vehicle (T1) Winning vehicle (T2)
1	Topeka	(United States) Bill Cooper (Brazil) Pierre Kleinubing	Chevrolet Corvette ZR1 Acura Integra R
2	Lime Rock	(United States) Peter Cunningham (Brazil) Pierre Kleinubing	Acura NSX Acura Integra R
3	Mid-Ohio	(United States) Terry Borcheller (United States) Hugh Plumb	Saleen Mustang BMW 328is
4	Minneapolis	(United States) Chris Wiehle (United States) Lance Stewart	Chevrolet Corvette Acura Integra R
5	West Michigan	(United States) Peter Cunningham (United States) Lance Stewart	Acura NSX Acura Integra R
6	Trois Rivieres	(United States) Terry Borcheller (United States) Michael Galati	Saleen Mustang Acura Integra R
7	Road America	(United States) Terry Borcheller (United States) Lance Stewart	Saleen Mustang Acura Integra R
8	Watkins Glen	(United States) Terry Borcheller (United States) Lance Stewart	Saleen Mustang Acura Integra R
9	Pike's Peak	(United States) Terry Borcheller (Brazil) Pierre Kleinubing	Saleen Mustang Acura Integra R
