= 2002 Speed World Challenge =

Seasons
- ← 2001 2003 →

The 2002 Speed World Challenge was the 13th running of the Sports Car Club of America's premier series. It began on March 15 and ran for eleven rounds. The name was changed from SpeedVision World Challenge due to the network changing its name from SpeedVision to Speed Channel.

== Results ==
Round	Date	Circuit	Winning driver (GT) Winning Driver (TC)	Winning Vehicle (GT) Winning Vehicle (TC)
1	March 15	Sebring	(United States) Michael Galati (Brazil) Pierre Kleinubing	Audi S4 Acura Integra R
2	May 18–19	Mosport	(United States) David Farmer (United States) Ken Dobson	Chevrolet Corvette ZO6 BMW 325Ci
3	May 27	Lime Rock	(United States) Randy Pobst (Brazil) Pierre Kleinubing	Porsche 911 Cup Acura Integra R
4	June 30	Mid Ohio	(United States) Michael Galati (United States) Will Turner	Audi S4 BMW 325i
5	July 6	Road America	(United States) Michael Galati (United States) Paul Bonaccorsi	Audi S4 Mazda Protege
6	July 21	RFK Stadium	(United States) Randy Pobst (United States) Marc Kirberg	Porsche 911 Cup BMW 325is
7	August 4	Trois-Rivieres	(United States) Randy Pobst (United States) Chuck Hemmingson	Porsche 911 Cup Mazda Protege
8	August 18	Mosport	Did not participate (United States) Paul Bonaccorsi	Did not participate Mazda Protege
9	September 21–22	Laguna Seca	(United States) Randy Pobst (United States) Paul Lambert	Porsche 911 Cup Audi A4
10	October 11	Road Atlanta	(United States) Peter Cunningham (United States) Peter Cunningham	Acura NSX Acura Integra R
11	October 27	Virginia	(United States) John Young (Brazil) Pierre Kleinubing	Saleen Mustang Acura Integra R
