= 1997 SCCA Pro Racing World Challenge =

Seasons
- ← 1996 1998 →

The 1997 SCCA Pro Racing World Challenge season was the eighth running of the Sports Car Club of America's World Challenge series. The 1997 season is notable in that it began a thirteen-year era of the touring car class being contested primarily between BMW, Mazda, and Acura. This changed in 2010 with the adoption of an entirely new format. 1997 also saw the end of combined classes, with separate races for each group. This lasted until the 2010 season. After several years of having at least three groups, the series was reduced to only two, a format unseen since the series' inaugural season. This went unchanged for thirteen years, after which the series changed to three and later four groups. After only mild success for three seasons, the Saturn brand got its final wins this season as another blow to General Motors in the series.

== Results ==
Round	Circuit	Winning driver (T1) Winning Driver (T2)	Winning Vehicle (T1) Winning Vehicle (T2)
1	St. Petersburg	(United States) Peter Cunningham (United States) Peter Schwartzott	Acura NSX Honda Prelude
2	Lime Rock	(United States) Kermit Upton III (United States) Kristian Skavnes	BMW M3 Saturn SC
3	Mid-Ohio	(United States) Peter Cunningham (United States) Paul Booher	Acura NSX Saturn SC
4	Watkins Glen	(United States) Lou Gigliotti (United States) Michael Galati	Saleen Mustang Acura Integra R
5	Minneapolis	(United States) Peter Kitchak (United States) Paul Booher	Porsche RSR Saturn SC
6	Topeka	(Canada) Ron Fellows (United States) Johannes Van Overbeek	Saleen Mustang BMW 328is
7	Tros-Rivieres	(United States) Peter Cunningham (United States) Alain Chebeir	Acura NSX BMW 328is
8	Mosport	(Canada) Ron Fellows (Brazil) Pierre Kleinubing	Saleen Mustang Acura Integra R
9	Pike's Peak	(United States) Peter Cunningham (Brazil) Pierre Kleinubing	Acura NSX Acura Integra R
10	Reno	(United States) Lou Gigliotti (United States) Johannes Van Overbeek	Saleen Mustang BMW 318Ti
