= 1991 SCCA Escort World Challenge =

Seasons
- ← 1990 1992 →

The 1991 SCCA Escort World Challenge was the second running of the Sports Car Club of America's World Challenge series. It was the final year under sponsorship from Escort radar detectors. The series would not find another corporate sponsor until television network SpeedVision bought the series in 1999. The race in Mexico would be their final race outside of North America (i.e. the United States and Canada) until their race in Puerto Rico twelve years later. The series also added a Super Sport group alongside its World Challenge and Super Production groups. The series would also adopt a 24-hour race at Mosport Park.

== Results ==
Round	Circuit	Winning driver (WC) Winning Driver (SP) Winning Driver (SS)	Winning Vehicle (WC) Winning Vehicle (SP) Winning Vehicle (SS)
1	(United States) Sears Point International Raceway	(United States) Shawn Hendricks (United States) Mitch Wright / (United States) Bo Lemler; Did not participate	Chevrolet Corvette Eagle Talon; Did not participate
2	(United States) Addison Airport Circuit	(United States) R.K. Smith (United States) Norris Raincourt; Did not participate	Chevrolet Corvette Honda CRX Si; Did not participate
3	(United States) Des Moines Street Circuit	(United States) Shawn Hendricks (United States) Peter Cunningham; Did not participate	Chevrolet Corvette BMW M3; Did not participate
4	(Canada) Mosport	(United States) R.K. Smith / (United States) Ken Wallace / (United States) Ken Wilden / (United States) Richard Spenard / (United States) David Empringham / (United States) Tommy Clark / (United States) Peter Cunningham (United States) Mitch Wright / (United States) Tommy Archer / (United States) Bobby Archer (United States) Lou Gigliotti / (United States) Leighton Reese / (United States) Brad Hoyt / (United States) Mark Behm / (United States) John Petrick	Chevrolet Corvette Eagle Talon; Chevrolet Camaro
5	(United States) Denver Street Circuit	(United States) Doc Bundy (United States) Dave Jolly (United States) Terry Borcheller	Lotus Esprit Oldsmobile Calais; Ford Mustang
6	(United States) Road America	(United States) Bobby Carradine (United States) Johannes Van Overbeek (United States) Dave Jolly	Lotus Esprit Oldsmobile Calais; Chevrolet Camaro
7	(United States) Texas World Speedway	(United States) Bobby Carradine (United States) Peter Schwartzott (United States) Bill Gray / (United States) Stu Hayner	Lotus Esprit Honda CRX; Chevrolet Camaro
8	(Mexico) Autódromo Gerardo Dominico Martinez	(United States) Boris Said III (United States) Tommy Archer; Did not participate	Ford Mustang Eagle Talon; Did not participate
