= 1994 SCCA Pro Racing World Challenge =

Seasons
- ← 1993 1995 →

The 1994 SCCA Pro Racing World Challenge season was the fifth running of the Sports Car Club of America's World Challenge series. To this date the 1994 season is the most recent in which an American manufacturer (Oldsmobile) won the touring car championship. The groups were changed from A, B, and C to World Challenge, Touring Car, and Super Production, reviving the class names not seen since 1991.

== Results ==
Round	Circuit	Winning driver (WC) Winning Driver (TC) Winning Driver (SP)	Winning Vehicle (WC) Winning Vehicle (TC) Winning Vehicle (SP)
1	Miami	(Brazil) Alencar, Jr. (United States) Willy Lewis (United States) Norris Rancourt	Porsche 944 Eagle Talon; Honda Prelude Si
2	Mid Ohio	(United States) John Heinricy (United States) Lou Gigliotti (United States) Norris Rancourt	Chevrolet Corvette Chevrolet Camaro; Honda Prelude Si
3	Des Moines	(Italy) Mauro Baldi (United States) Neil Hannemann (United States) Peter Cunningham	Porsche 911 Turbo Eagle Talon; Honda Prelude
4	Trois-Rivières	(Italy) Mauro Baldi (United States) Bill Cooper (Canada) Dave Jolly	Porsche 911 Turbo; Chevrolet Camaro Oldsmobile Achieva
5	Mosport	(United States) Richard Spenard (United States) Bill Cooper (United States) Ron Emmick	Chevrolet Camaro Chevrolet Camaro; Oldsmobile Achieva
6	Road Atlanta	(United States) Price Cobb (United States) Neil Hannemann (United States) Peter Cunningham	Porsche 911 Turbo Eagle Talon; Honda Prelude Si
7	Road America	(United States) Price Cobb Did not participate (United States) Dave Jolly	Porsche 911 Turbo Did not participate Oldsmobile Achieva
8	Dallas	(United States) Price Cobb (United States) Lou Gigliotti; Did not participate	Porsche 911 Turbo Chevrolet Camaro; Did not participate
