= List of American Le Mans Series circuits =

The American Le Mans Series raced on 27 different circuits during its 15-year history. Four tracks: Mazda Raceway Laguna Seca, Canadian Tire Motorsport Park, Road Atlanta, and Sebring International Raceway; hosted an event in each year of the series.

In its early years, the series visited rovals at Charlotte, Las Vegas, and Texas, but the last of these events was held in 2001. The ALMS held events on 8 temporary street circuits, although only Long Beach lasted more than 3 years.

In 2000, the series raced in Europe, at the Nürburgring and Silverstone, as a precursor to the 2001 European Le Mans Series season. Two more European races (Donington and Jarama) were joint events with the ELMS in 2001. The Adelaide event in 2000 was also planned as a precursor to an Asia-Pacific Le Mans Series which never materialized. From 2002, the series only visited circuits in the United States and Canada.

Circuits from the last year (2013) are shown in bold.

Circuit	Type	Location	Seasons	Total	Map
Adelaide Street Circuit	Street circuit	Adelaide, South Australia; 34°55′38″S 138°37′2″E	2000	1	
**Baltimore Street Circuit**	Street circuit	(United States) Baltimore, Maryland; 39°17′N 76°37′W	2011–2013	3	
Bayfront Park	Street circuit	(United States) Miami, Florida; 25°46′30″N 80°11′10″W	2002–2003	2	
**Canadian Tire Motorsport Park**	Race circuit	(Canada) Bowmanville, Ontario; 44°2′53″N 78°40′32″W	1999–2013	15	
Charlotte Motor Speedway	Roval	(United States) Concord, North Carolina; 35°21′3″N 80°41′1″W	2000	1	
**Circuit of the Americas**	Race circuit	(United States) Austin, Texas; 30°7′58″N 97°38′28″W	2013	1	Austin
Circuit Trois-Rivières	Street circuit	(Canada) Trois-Rivières, Québec; 46°20′51″N 72°33′31″W	2002–2003	2	
Circuito Permanente del Jarama	Race circuit	(Spain) Madrid; 40°37′2″N 3°35′8″W	2001	1	
Detroit Belle Isle Street Circuit	Street circuit	(United States) Detroit, Michigan; 42°20′10″N 82°59′44″W	2007–2008	2	
Donington Park	Race circuit	(United Kingdom) Castle Donington, Leicestershire; 52°49′50″N 1°22′31″W	2001	1	
Infineon Raceway	Race circuit	(United States) Sonoma, California; 38°9′36″N 122°27′34″W	1999–2005	7	
Las Vegas Motor Speedway	Roval	(United States) Clark County, Nevada; 36°16′17″N 115°0′40″W	1999–2000	2	
**Lime Rock Park**	Race circuit	(United States) Lakeville, Connecticut; 41°55′40″N 73°23′1″W	2004–2013	10	
**Long Beach Street Circuit**	Street circuit	(United States) Long Beach, California; 33°45′59″N 118°11′34″W	2007–2013	7	
**Mazda Raceway Laguna Seca**	Race circuit	(United States) Monterey, California; 36°35′05″N 121°45′10″W	1999–2013	15	
Mid-Ohio Sports Car Course	Race circuit	(United States) Troy Township, Morrow County, Ohio; 40°41′21″N 82°38′11″W	2001–2002, 2004–2012	11	
Miller Motorsports Park	Race circuit	(United States) Tooele, Utah; 40°34′30″N 112°22′29″W	2006–2010	5	
Nürburgring	Race circuit	(Germany) Nürburg; 50°20′08″N 6°56′51″E	2000	1	
Portland International Raceway	Race circuit	(United States) Portland, Oregon; 45°35′49″N 122°41′45″W	1999–2001, 2004–2006	6	
Reliant Park	Street circuit	(United States) Houston, Texas; 29°40′56″N 95°24′31″W	2006–2007	2	
**Road America**	Race circuit	(United States) Elkhart Lake, Wisconsin; 43°48′0″N 87°59′13″W	2002–2013	12	
**Road Atlanta**	Race circuit	(United States) Braselton, Georgia; 34°8′48″N 83°49′4″W	1999–2013	18^{[A]}	
St. Petersburg Street Circuit	Street circuit	(United States) St. Petersburg, Florida; 27°45′59″N 82°37′45″W	2007–2009	3	
**Sebring International Raceway**	Race circuit	(United States) Sebring, Florida; 27°27′17″N 81°20′54″W	1999–2013	15	
Silverstone Circuit	Race circuit	(United Kingdom) Silverstone, Northamptonshire; 52°4′43″N 1°1′1″W	2000	1	
Texas Motor Speedway	Roval	(United States) Fort Worth, Texas; 33°2′13″N 97°16′59″W	2000–2001	2	
**Virginia International Raceway**	Race circuit	(United States) Alton, Virginia; 36°33′42″N 79°12′17″W	2012–2013	2	
Washington Street Circuit	Street circuit	(United States) Washington, D.C. 38°53′41″N 76°58′12″W	2002	1	

- **^{A}** Track held two races in 1999, 2003, and 2005. Count does not include the 1998 Petit Le Mans.
