= Tommy Archer =

American racing driver

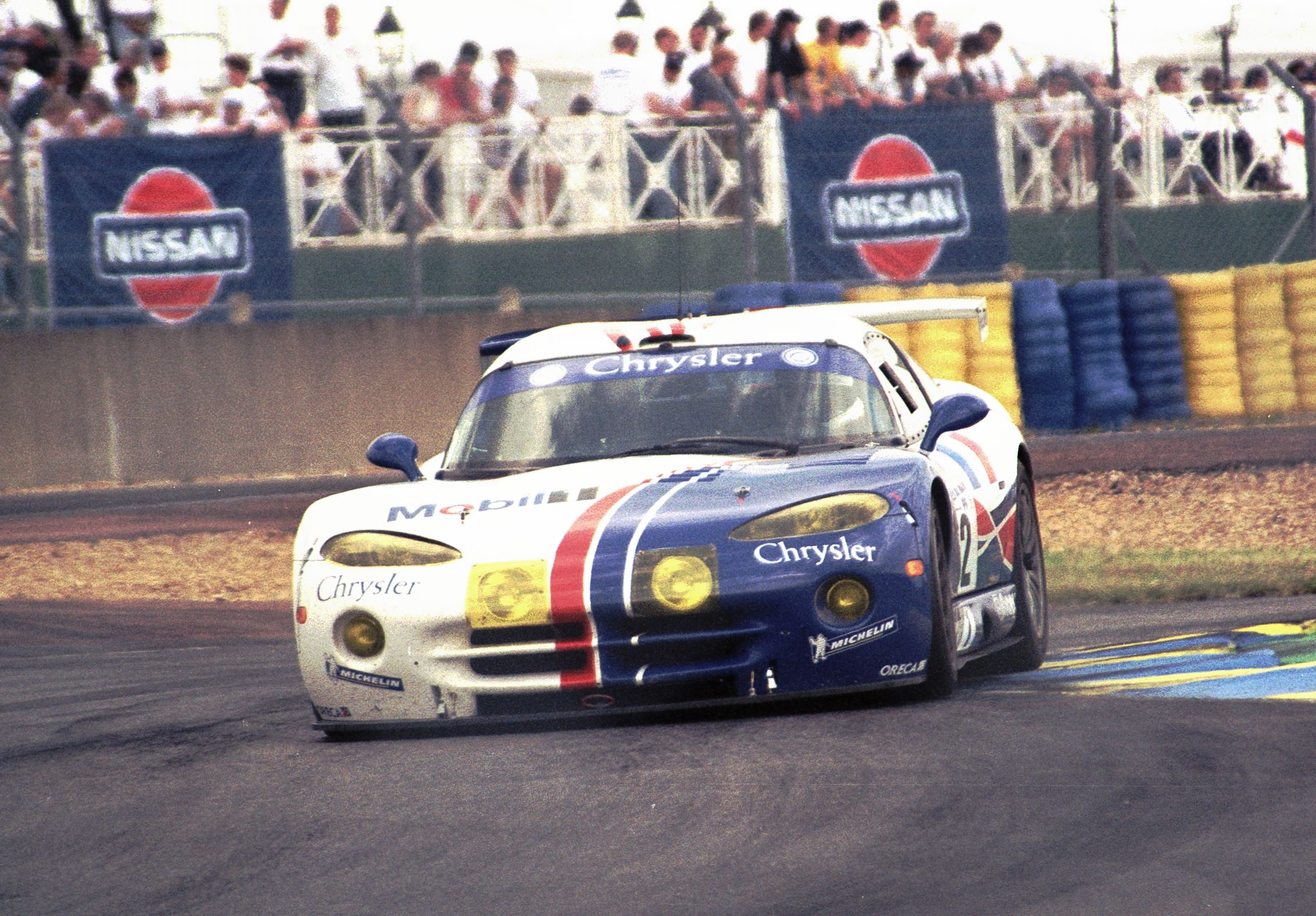
- Archer at the 1999 24 Hours of Le Mans
- Nationality: (United States) American
- Born: Thomas James Archer; November 16, 1954 (age 71) Duluth, Minnesota, U.S.

NASCAR FedEx Freight Truck Series career
- 5 races run over 3 years
- Best finish: 50th (1995)
- First race: 1995 Skoal Bandit Copper World Classic (Phoenix)
- Last race: 1999 O'Reilly Auto Parts 275 (Topeka)
| Wins | Top tens | Poles |
|---|---|---|
| 0 | 1 | 0 |

Thomas James Archer (born November 16, 1954) is an American professional racing driver. He has competed in IMSA, SCCA, Trans-Am Series, 24 Hours of Le Mans and NASCAR events.

== Racing career ==
Archer started his racing career in ice racing, running Porsches borrowed from his father's car dealership. He later attempted the SCCA Runoffs, finishing second in 1980. Along with his brother Bobby, Archer won an IMSA championship in 1984. The duo also ran road races with Porsche Le Car entries throughout the 1980s. In 1986, they won the SCCA drivers' championship. Late in the 1980s, Archer also drove Jeeps in the SCCA truck series. In 1987, Archer qualified fastest in the GTO class of the 24 Hours of Daytona. From 1989 to 1996, the brothers won an additional eight SCCA championships.

Archer also dabbled in the Trans-Am Series, helping Dodge enter victory lane. He debuted in the Trans-Am Series in 1992 and claimed a race win at Detroit Belle Isle. In both 1998 and 1999, Archer claimed the runner-up spot in the 24-hour race in Le Mans, France. The runs while Archer drove for Oreca. He also spent a stint driving in the American Le Mans Series. At the end of the 2004 season, he won the SCCA World Challenge title. Archer continued running SCCA events until the late 2000s. In 2015 and 2016, Archer raced Trans-Am cars again.

== Personal life ==
Archer is a prostate cancer survivor. He is also a Coldwell Banker-affiliated real estate agent. He and his brother formerly operated an auto parts store in Duluth, Minnesota.

== Motorsports career results ==
=== SCCA National Championship Runoffs ===
| Year | Track | Car | Engine | Class | Finish | Start | Status |
|---|---|---|---|---|---|---|---|
| 1980 | Road Atlanta | Renault LeCar | Renault | GT4 | 2 | 1 | Retired |

=== 24 Hours of Le Mans results ===
| Year | Team | Co-Drivers | Car | Class | Laps | Pos. | Class Pos. |
|---|---|---|---|---|---|---|---|
| 1997 | (France) Viper Team Oreca | (France) Soheil Ayari (Belgium) Marc Duez | Chrysler Viper GTS-R | GT2 | 76 | DNF | DNF |
| 1998 | (France) Viper Team Oreca | (Monaco) Olivier Beretta (Portugal) Pedro Lamy | Chrysler Viper GTS-R | GT2 | 312 | 13th | **2nd** |
| 1999 | (France) Viper Team Oreca | (United Kingdom) Justin Bell (Belgium) Marc Duez | Chrysler Viper GTS-R | GTS | 318 | 12th | **2nd** |
| 2000 | (France) Viper Team Oreca | (Belgium) Marc Duez (Netherlands) Patrick Huisman | Chrysler Viper GTS-R | GTS | 324 | 12th | 5th |

=== NASCAR ===
(key) (Bold – Pole position awarded by qualifying time. Italics – Pole position earned by points standings or practice time. * – Most laps led.)

==== Craftsman Truck Series ====
NASCAR Craftsman Truck Series results
| Year | Team | No. | Make | 1 | 2 | 3 | 4 | 5 | 6 | 7 | 8 | 9 | 10 | 11 | 12 | 13 | 14 | 15 | 16 | 17 | 18 | 19 | 20 | 21 | 22 | 23 | 24 | 25 | 26 | 27 | NCTC | Pts | Ref |
|---|---|---|---|---|---|---|---|---|---|---|---|---|---|---|---|---|---|---|---|---|---|---|---|---|---|---|---|---|---|---|---|---|---|
| 1995 | Archer Motorsports | 03 | Ford | PHO; 18 | TUS | SGS | MMR | POR | EVG | I70 | LVL | BRI | MLW | CNS | HPT; 10 | IRP | FLM | RCH; 27 | MAR | NWS | SON | MMR | PHO | | | | | | | | 50th | 325 | |
| 1998 | Westbrook Racing | 4 | Dodge | WDW; 36 | HOM; DNQ | PHO | POR | EVG | I70 | GLN | TEX | BRI | MLW | NZH | CAL | PPR | IRP | NHA | FLM | NSV | HPT | LVL | RCH | MEM | GTY | MAR | SON | MMR | PHO | LVS | 100th | 77 | |
| 1999 | K-Automotive Motorsports | 29 | Ford | HOM | PHO | EVG | MMR | MAR | MEM | PPR | I70 | BRI | TEX | PIR | GLN | MLW | NSV | NZH | MCH | NHA | IRP | GTY | HPT; 16 | RCH | LVS | LVL | TEX | CAL | | | 85th | 120 | |
