= R. K. Smith =

American racing driver (born 1937)

- Born: October 16, 1937 (age 89); Murrieta, California, U.S.

NASCAR Cup Series career
- 2 races run over 2 years
- Best finish: 83rd (1992)
- First race: 1991 Banquet Frozen Foods 300 (Sonoma)
- Last race: 1992 Save Mart 300K (Sonoma)
| Wins | Top tens | Poles |
|---|---|---|
| 0 | 0 | 0 |
- Statistics up to date as of September 14, 2016.

R. K. Smith (born October 16, 1937) is an American former stock car racing driver. He competed in the NASCAR Winston Cup Series in the early nineties, making two starts at Sonoma.

== Racing career ==
Before racing in stock cars, Smith was a regular competitor in the SCCA and IMSA championships. He won the SCCA National Championship Runoffs Formula F class in 1983. Smith also competed in numerous 24 Hours of Daytona events in the late 1990s and early 2000s.

=== Winston Cup Series ===
Smith made his Winston Cup debut in 1991, when he drove the No. 09 Pontiac for Dick Midgley. He qualified 36th at Sonoma but finished in last position after his engine failed on the second lap of the race. He also attempted the race at Phoenix, but failed to make the race. His only start in 1992 came at Sonoma, where he qualified 29th. He retired in the final stages of the race when again his engine failed. Smith attempted the race at Sonoma in 1993, but failed to qualify for the race.

Smith returned to the series in 1997 when he drove the No. 09 Pontiac for Gary Smith and Dick Midgley at Sonoma. Smith set the 47th time in qualifying and failed to make the race. In 1999 Smith was hired by Dave Marcis to drive his No. 71 Chevy at Sonoma. Smith just missed the race as he set the 44th time in qualifying. He continued to for Marcis at the road courses in 2000. Smith was 46th in qualifying at Sonoma and failed to qualify for the race. He also failed to make the race at Watkins Glen after qualifying was rained out and the field was set by owner points.

== Motorsports career results ==
=== NASCAR ===
(key) (Bold – Pole position awarded by qualifying time. Italics – Pole position earned by points standings or practice time. * – Most laps led.)

==== Winston Cup Series ====
NASCAR Winston Cup Series results
| Year | Team | No. | Make | 1 | 2 | 3 | 4 | 5 | 6 | 7 | 8 | 9 | 10 | 11 | 12 | 13 | 14 | 15 | 16 | 17 | 18 | 19 | 20 | 21 | 22 | 23 | 24 | 25 | 26 | 27 | 28 | 29 | 30 | 31 | 32 | 33 | 34 | NWCC | Pts | Ref |
|---|---|---|---|---|---|---|---|---|---|---|---|---|---|---|---|---|---|---|---|---|---|---|---|---|---|---|---|---|---|---|---|---|---|---|---|---|---|---|---|---|
| 1991 | Midgley Racing | 09 | Pontiac | DAY | RCH | CAR | ATL | DAR | BRI | NWS | MAR | TAL | CLT | DOV | SON; 43 | POC | MCH | DAY | POC | TAL | GLN | MCH | BRI | DAR | RCH | DOV | MAR | NWS | CLT | CAR | PHO; DNQ | ATL | | | | | | 92nd | 34 | |
| 1992 | Midgley Racing | 09 | Pontiac | DAY | CAR | RCH | ATL | DAR | BRI | NWS | MAR | TAL | CLT | DOV | SON; 33 | POC | MCH | DAY | POC | TAL | GLN | MCH | BRI | DAR | RCH | DOV | MAR | NWS | CLT | CAR | PHO | ATL | | | | | | 83rd | 64 | |
| 1993 | Midgley Racing | 09 | Pontiac | DAY | CAR | RCH | ATL | DAR | BRI | NWS | MAR | TAL | SON; DNQ | CLT | DOV | POC | MCH | DAY | NHA | POC | TAL | GLN | MCH | BRI | DAR | RCH | DOV | MAR | NWS | CLT | CAR | PHO | ATL | | | | | NA | - | |
| 1997 | Smith Racing | 09W | Pontiac | DAY | CAR | RCH | ATL | DAR | TEX | BRI | MAR | SON; DNQ | TAL | CLT | DOV | POC | MCH | CAL | DAY | NHA | POC | IND | GLN | MCH | BRI | DAR | RCH | NHA | DOV | MAR | CLT | TAL | CAR | PHO | ATL | | | NA | - | |
| 1999 | Marcis Auto Racing | 71 | Chevy | DAY | CAR | LVS | ATL | DAR | TEX | BRI | MAR | TAL | CAL | RCH | CLT | DOV | MCH | POC | SON; DNQ | DAY | NHA | POC | IND | GLN | MCH | BRI | DAR | RCH | NHA | DOV | MAR | CLT | TAL | CAR | PHO | HOM | ATL | NA | - | |
| 2000 | Marcis Auto Racing | 71 | Chevy | DAY | CAR | LVS | ATL | DAR | BRI | TEX | MAR | TAL | CAL | RCH | CLT | DOV | MCH | POC | SON; DNQ | DAY | NHA | POC | IND | GLN; DNQ | MCH | BRI | DAR | RCH | NHA | DOV | MAR | CLT | TAL | CAR | PHO | HOM | ATL | NA | - | |

=== ARCA SuperCar Series ===
(key) (Bold – Pole position awarded by qualifying time. Italics – Pole position earned by points standings or practice time. * – Most laps led.)

ARCA SuperCar Series results
| Year | Team | No. | Make | 1 | 2 | 3 | 4 | 5 | 6 | 7 | 8 | 9 | 10 | 11 | 12 | 13 | 14 | 15 | 16 | 17 | 18 | 19 | 20 | 21 | ASCSC | Pts | Ref |
|---|---|---|---|---|---|---|---|---|---|---|---|---|---|---|---|---|---|---|---|---|---|---|---|---|---|---|---|
| 1992 | Midgley Racing | 09 | Pontiac | DAY | FIF | TWS | TAL | TOL | KIL | POC | MCH | FRS | KIL | NSH | DEL | POC | HPT | FRS | ISF | TOL | DSF | TWS; DNQ | SLM | ATL | NA | - | |
