= Acura TSX =

Compact executive car by Acura (2004-2014)

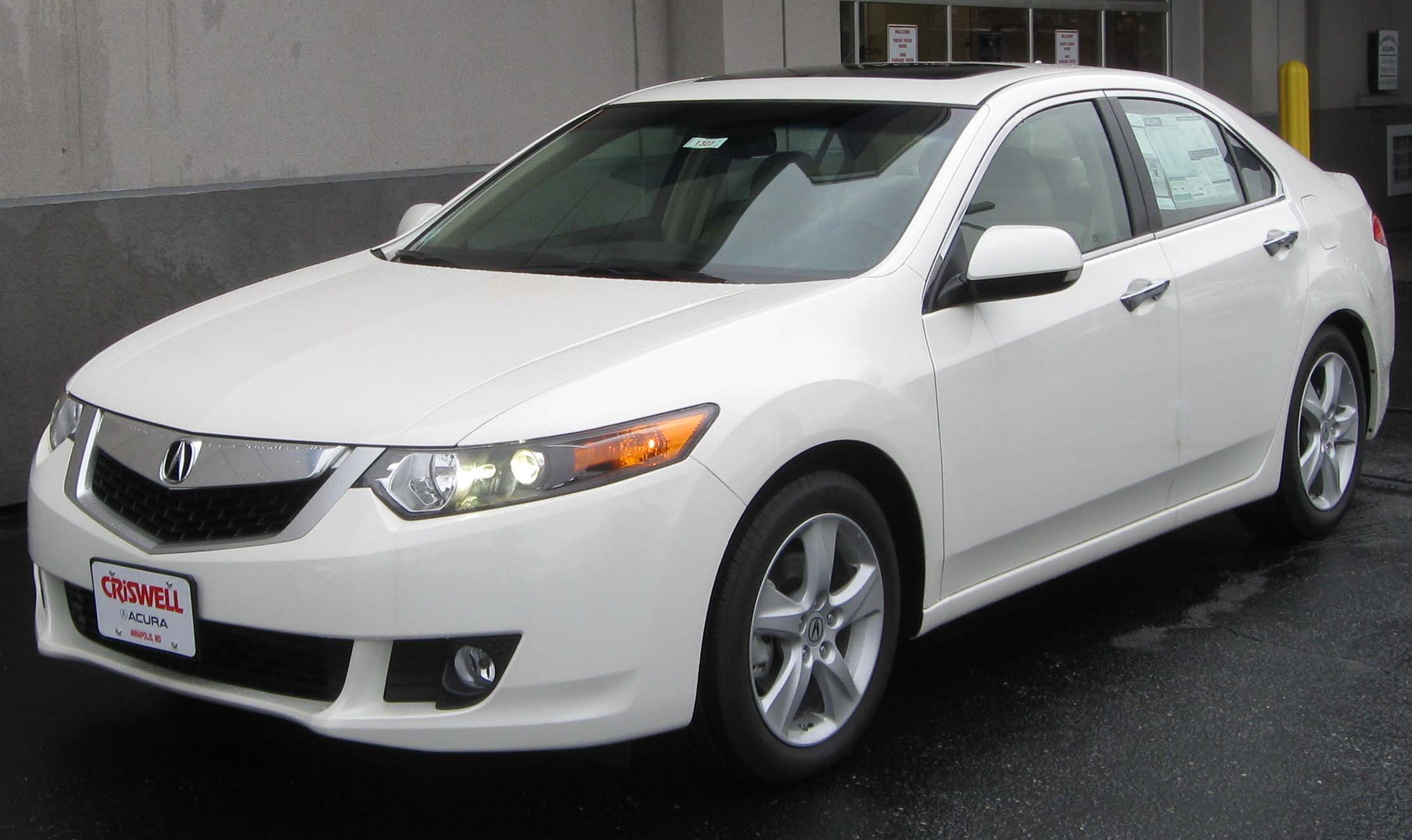
- 2009–2014 Acura TSX

Overview
- Manufacturer: Honda
- Also called: Honda Accord (Japan and Europe); Honda Accord Euro (Australia and New Zealand)
- Production: 2003–2014
- Model years: 2004–2014

Body and chassis
- Class: Compact executive car (D)
- Layout: FF layout

Chronology
- Predecessor: Acura Integra (sedan, US only)
- Successor: Acura TLX; Acura ILX (as entry-level in the US); Acura RDX (for station wagon)

The Acura TSX is a compact executive car manufactured by Honda and sold through its Acura division from the 2004 to 2014 model years. The TSX spanned two generations, both derived from the corresponding Japanese/European versions of the Honda Accord, which were more compact and sporting-oriented than their larger North American counterpart. The latter Accord platform was also used for the Acura TL, which slotted above the TSX in Acura's lineup. All TSXs were built in Sayama, Saitama, Japan.

The first-generation TSX was introduced in April 2003 as a 2004 model, as a rebadged version of the Japanese domestic market (JDM) Honda Accord 2.4 Type-S, with the exception of its interior, borrowed from the JDM fourth-generation Honda Inspire. It was succeeded by the second-generation TSX, introduced in March 2008 as a 2009 model and based on the eighth-generation JDM Accord. Notably, the final generation of the TSX would introduce a V6 option for the 2010 model, and a wagon for the 2011 model year.

It was sold in North America under the Acura luxury marque as the replacement for the Integra sedan which was discontinued in 2001 (1996 in Canada since the EL was the Integra sedan's replacement there), and would become Acura's entry-level vehicle after the Acura RSX got discontinued in 2006. From the 2007 model year until 2012, the TSX was the smallest vehicle in the Acura model line, other than the Civic-based CSX and the preceding Acura 1.6 and 1.7 EL sold only in Canada. In 2013, the smaller ILX was introduced in both the United States and Canada, based upon the Civic platform (replacing the CSX in Canada).

Honda discontinued the TSX and the larger TL in 2014 with the introduction of the TLX, which replaced both vehicles, although the TLX is close in size to the TL. The ILX, introduced for the 2012 model year, succeeded the TSX as Acura's entry-level offering.

== First generation (CL9; 2004) ==
First generation
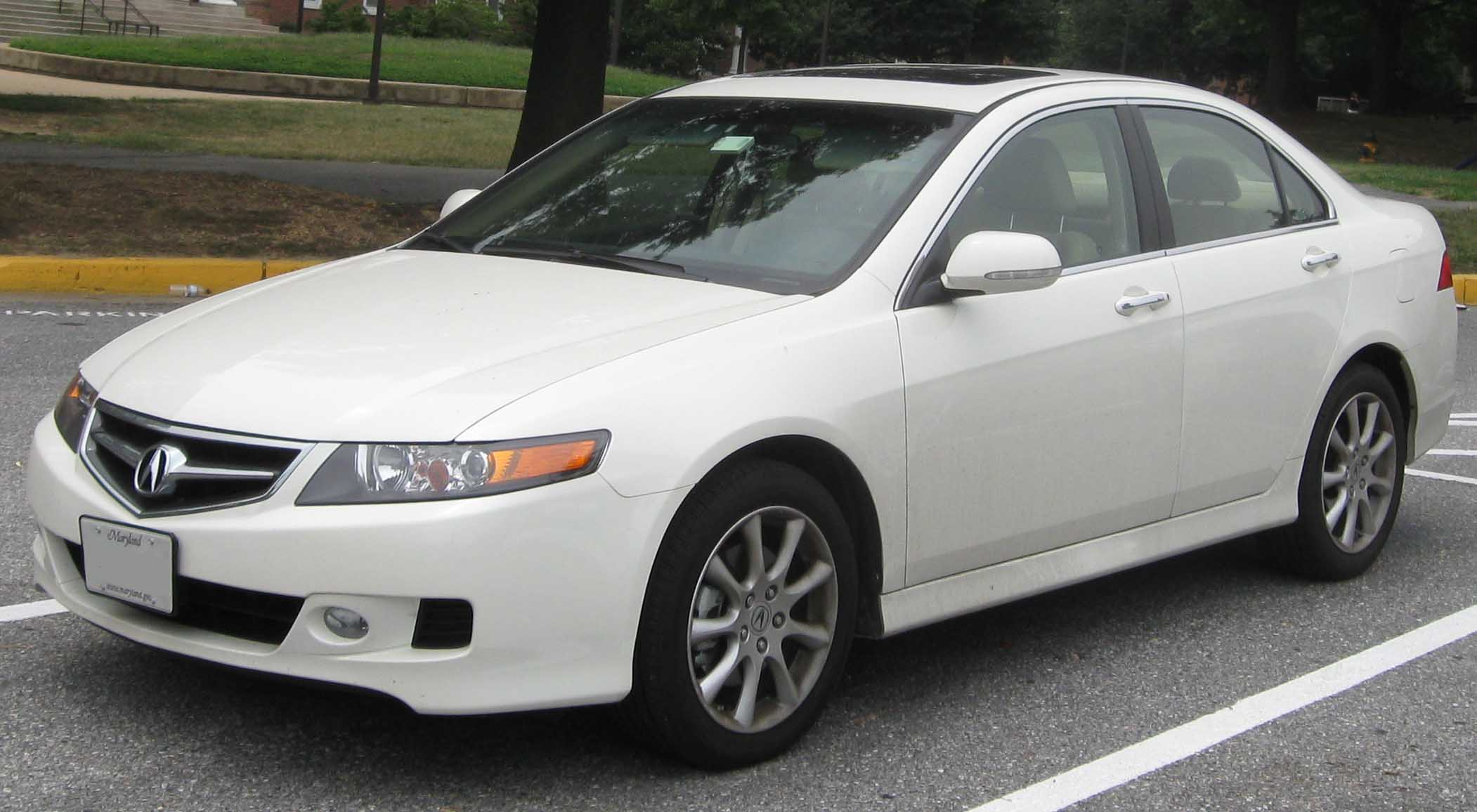
- 2006–2008 Acura TSX

Overview
- Model code: CL9
- Also called: Honda Accord (Japan and Europe)
- Production: March 2003 – January 2008
- Model years: 2004–2008
- Assembly: Sayama, Japan
- Designer: Kunihiko Tachibana, Hiroshi Ishibani (2000)

Body and chassis
- Body style: 4-door sedan

Powertrain
- Engine: K24A2 200-205 hp (153 kW) at 6800-7000 rpm and 164 lb⋅ft (222 N⋅m) at 4500 rpm I4
- Transmission: 5-speed automatic 6-speed manual

Dimensions
- Wheelbase: 105.1 in (2,670 mm)
- Length: 183.3 in (4,656 mm)
- Width: 69.4 in (1,763 mm)
- Height: 57.3 in (1,455 mm)
- Curb weight: 3,318 lb (1,505 kg)

=== Overview ===
The Acura TSX was introduced at the 2003 North American International Auto Show as a production model. The 2004 model year TSX's powertrain consisted of a 2.4-liter inline four-cylinder K24A2 engine which produced 200 horsepower, a six-speed manual transmission (which featured a magnesium casing, to reduce weight), and a front wheel drive layout. A five-speed automatic transmission was a no-cost option in the U.S. based on MSRP; however, such was not the case in Canada. Acura marketed the TSX for consumers interested in the sporty and aggressive look based on the Japanese Demographic Market.

Acura came out with the TSX in exterior colors: Alabaster Silver Metallic, Arctic Blue Pearl, Carbon Gray Pearl, Deep Green Pearl, Glacier Blue Metallic, Nighthawk Black Pearl, Milano Red, Premium White Pearl, and Royal Blue Pearl.

2005 was the second model year of the TSX and Acura updated it with XM Satellite Radio, a four-way power passenger seat and illuminated the steering wheel-mounted audio and cruise controls. Along with the slight tweaks to the engine in 2006, interior tech features were also added, including a Multi-information Display (MID) in the instrument panel, and luxury features such as a two-position memory for the driver's seat adjustments which adjusted according to which of two keys were being used, auxiliary MP3 player input and Bluetooth-compatible HandsFreeLink (for cellular phones). The Bluetooth HandsFreeLink system operates through voice control, where the user speaks when the HandsFreeLink button is pressed. Six different phones can be paired up to the HandsFreeLink system.

Sales on November 9, 2005 for the 2006 model year, the TSX was updated with slight tweaks to the engine (adding 5 hp with an increase from 200 hp to 205 hp); a sportier exterior styling featuring a slightly new front and rear treatment, standard side skirts, and standard, integral fog lights; and restyled wheels.

For the 2007 model year, Tire Pressure Monitoring System and an improved electronic rear view mirror were added, while the 2008 model year brought a new color option.

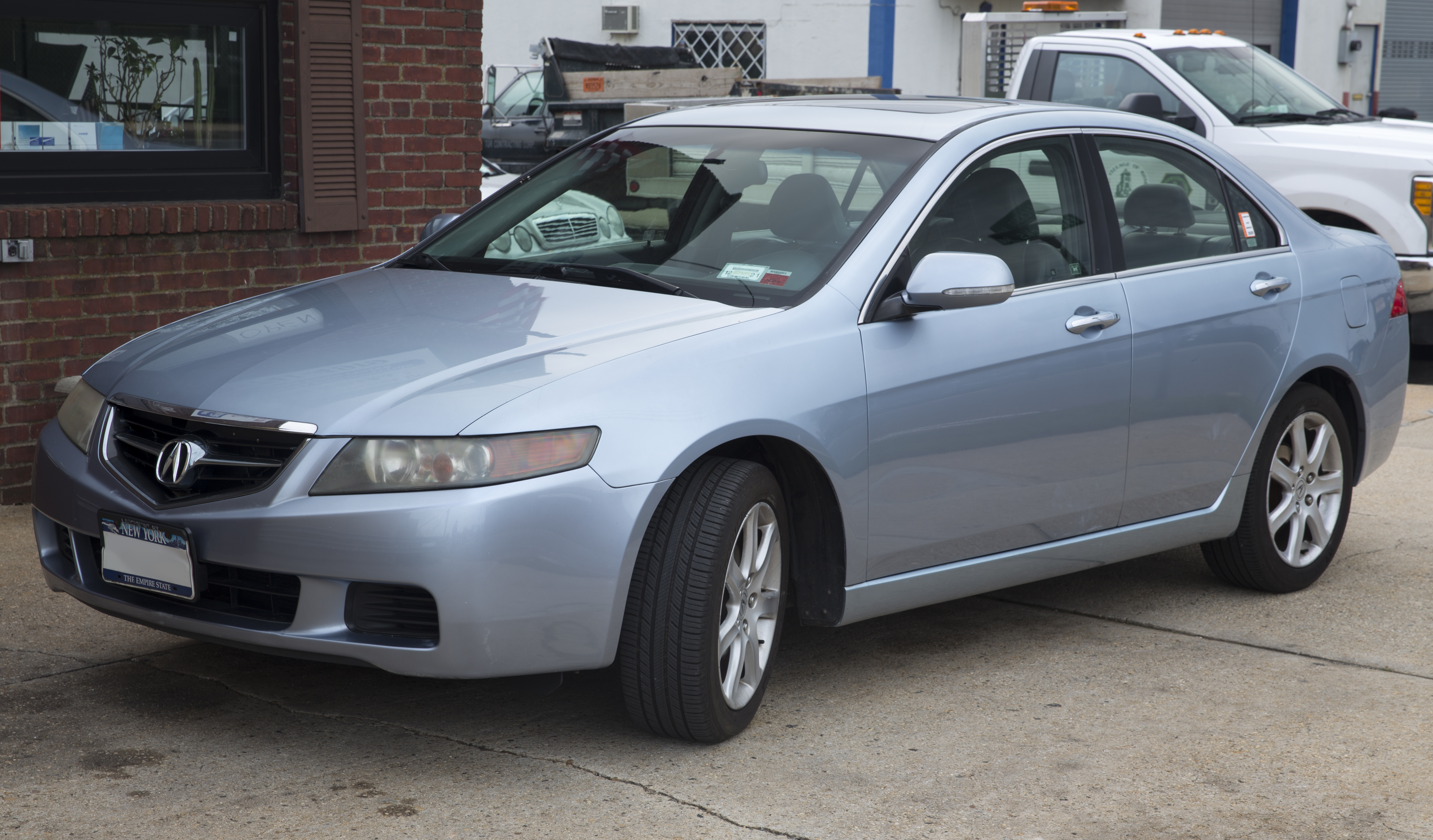
2004-05 TSX

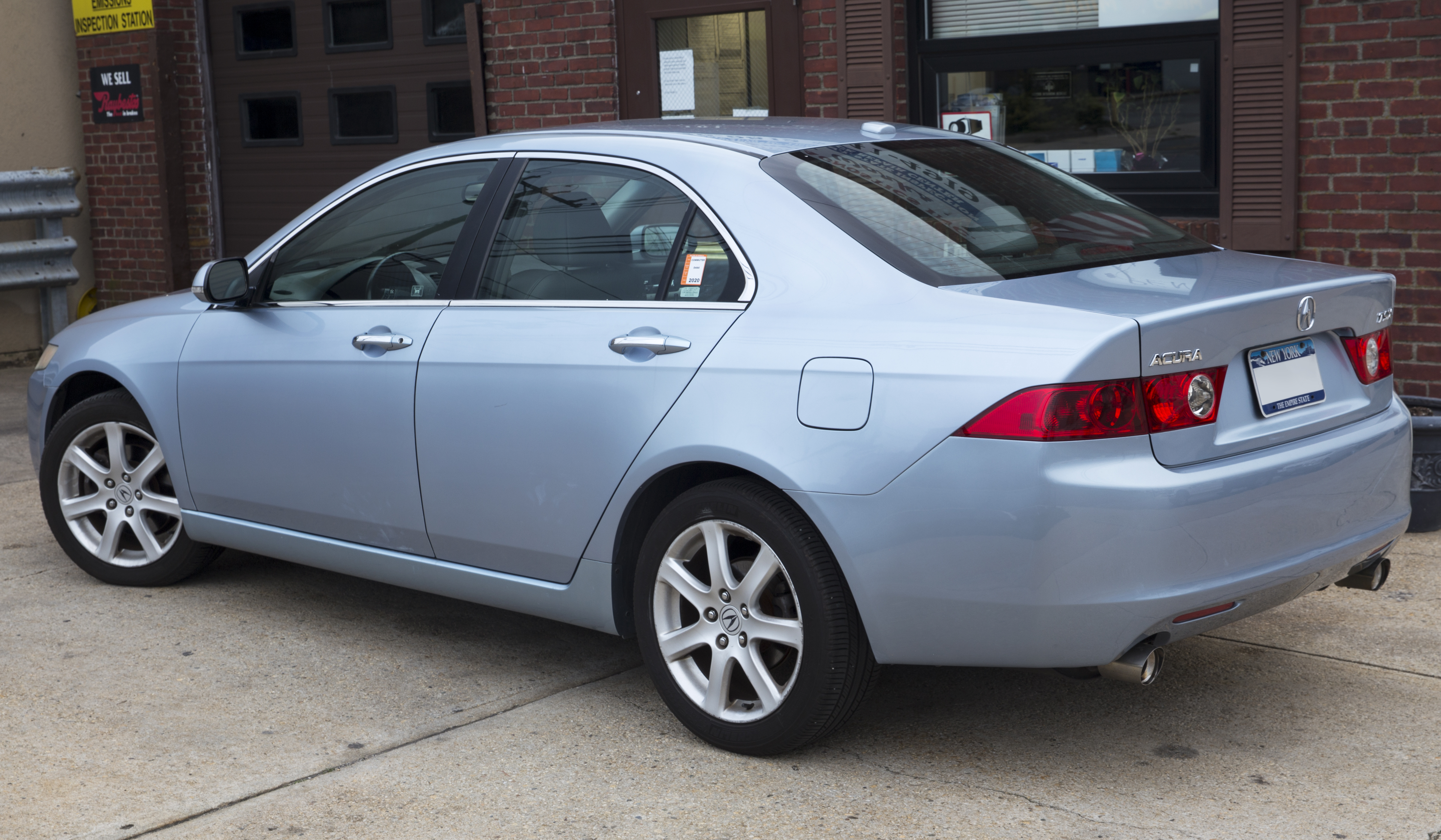
Rear view (2004-05 model)

=== Safety ===
In testing conducted by the United States-based Insurance Institute for Highway Safety (IIHS), the Acura TSX received an overall rating of "Good" for frontal offset testing, an overall rating of "Poor" rear crash protection, and an overall rating of "Acceptable" for side impact testing.

=== Engine ===
The K24A2 engine used in the TSX was related to the engine in the Honda Accord (7th generation), the Honda CR-V, and the Honda Element. The K24A2 featured intelligent variable valve timing (i-VTEC) and produced 200 hp (149 kW) in this iteration. Another feature of the i-VTEC system on the TSX and RSX-s was that, unlike other Honda K-series motors, variable timing was used on both the intake and exhaust cams in its three rocker design.

In 2005, for the 2006 model year, the K24A2 was updated to produce 205 hp (153 kW). The diameter of the throttle body and intake valves were slightly increased, along with the cam duration and valve lift.

== Second generation (CU2; 2009) ==
Second generation
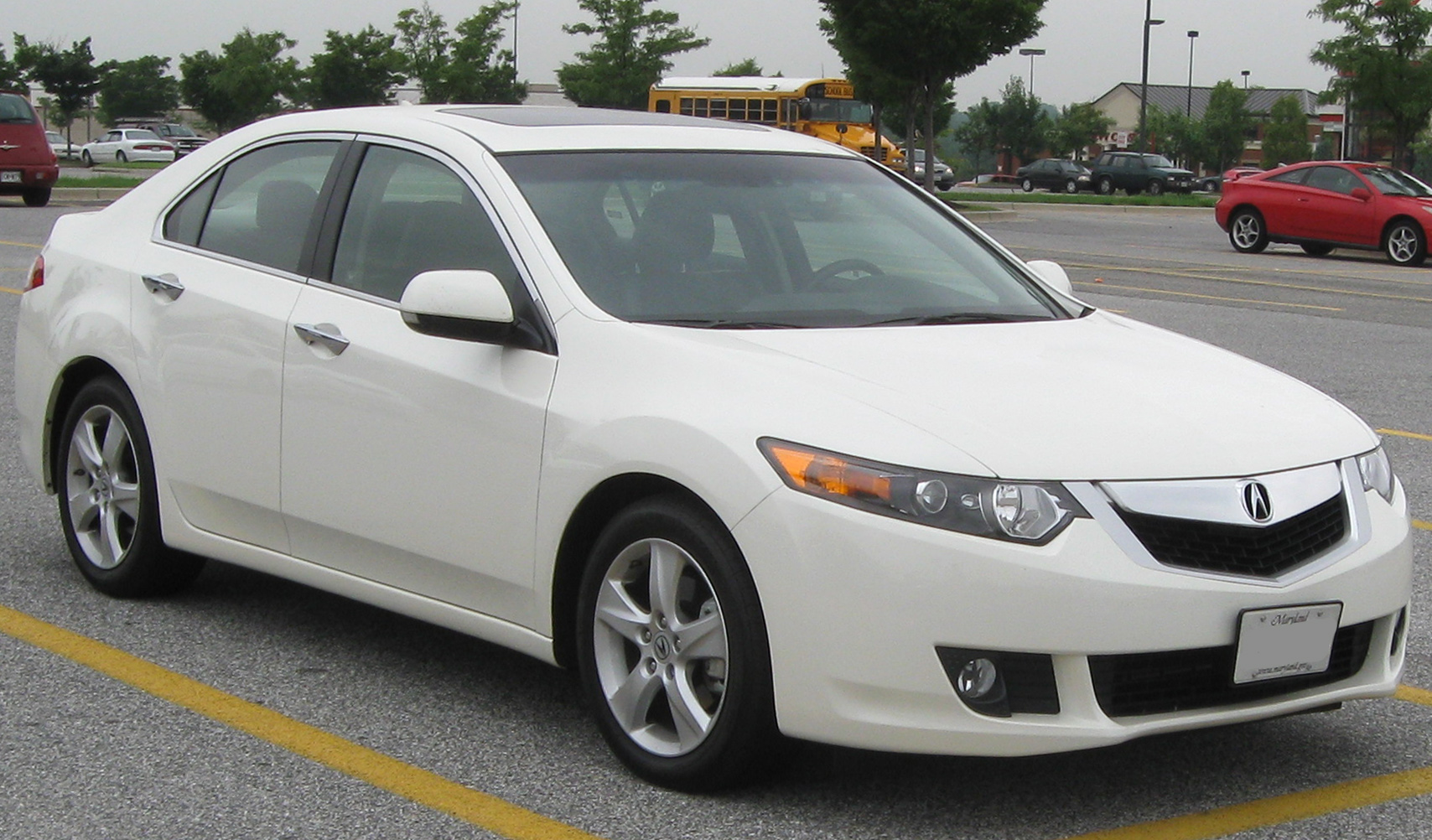
- 2009 Acura TSX

Overview
- Model code: CU2; CU4 (V6 model); CW2 (Sport Wagon)
- Also called: Honda Accord (Japan and Europe); Honda Spirior (first generation)
- Production: 2008–2014
- Model years: 2009–2014
- Assembly: Sayama, Japan
- Designer: Jarad Hall (2006)

Body and chassis
- Body style: 4-door sedan 5-door station wagon
- Related: Honda Accord (North America); Acura TL

Powertrain
- Engine: 2.4 L K24Z3 201 hp (150 kW) and 172 lb⋅ft (233 N⋅m) I4; 3.5 L J35Z6 280 hp V6 (2010-2014)
- Transmission: 5-speed automatic 6-speed manual

Dimensions
- Wheelbase: 106.5 in (2,705 mm)
- Length: Sedan: 185.6 in (4,714 mm); Wagon: 189.4 in (4,811 mm)
- Width: 72.4 in (1,839 mm)
- Height: Sedan: 56.7 in (1,440 mm); Wagon: 57.9 in (1,471 mm)
- Curb weight: 3,470 lb (1,574 kg) AT; 3,400 lb (1,542 kg) MT

=== Overview ===
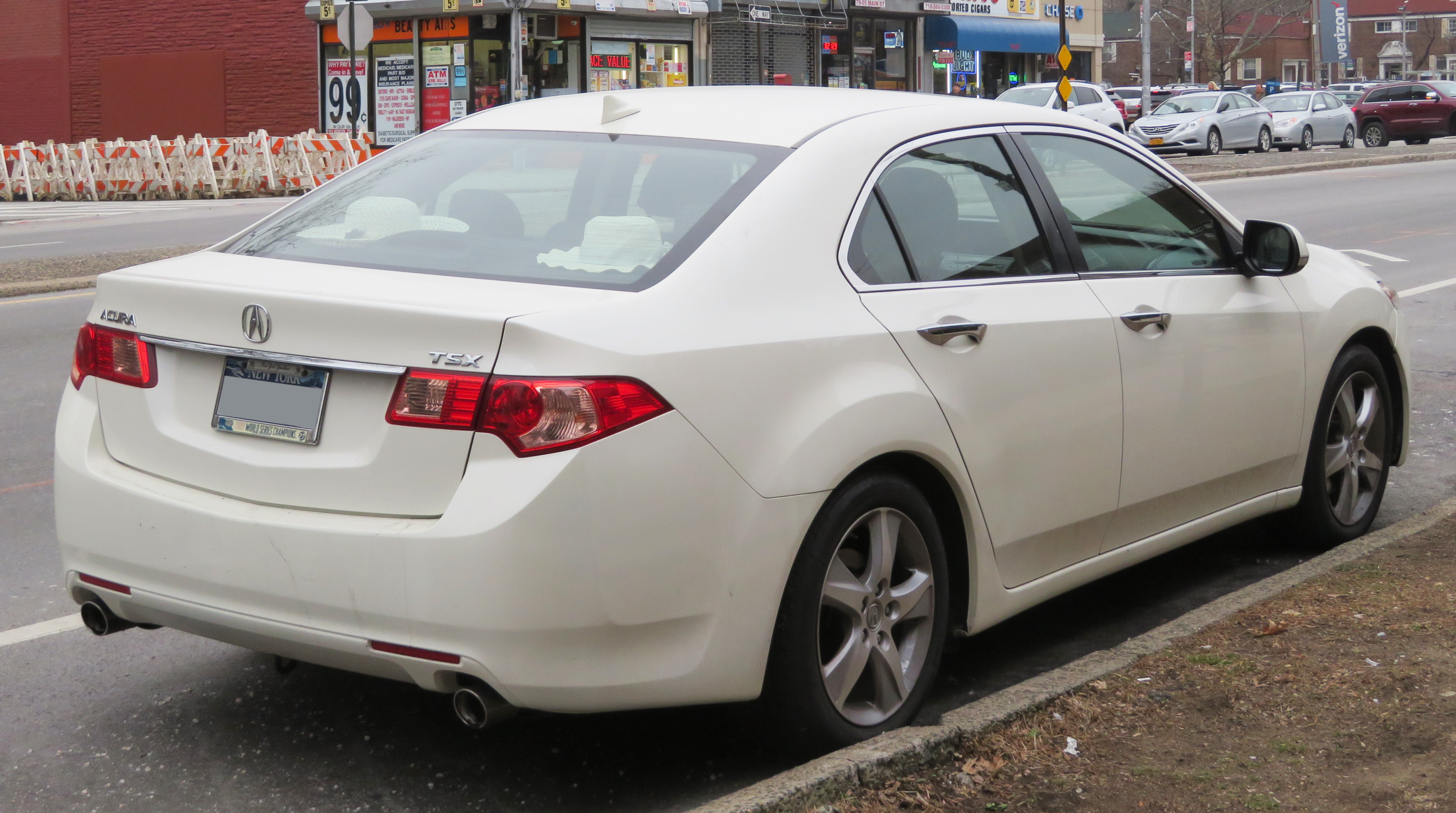
2011 Acura TSX 2.4L sedan

The second-generation TSX made its debut at the New York International Auto Show on March 20, 2008, before going on sale on April 24, 2008 for the 2009 model year. In terms of size, the TSX was larger than its predecessor with 3.0-inch (76 mm) greater width, a 2.6-inch (66 mm) wider track and a 1.3-inch (33 mm) longer wheelbase, and the length grew by 2.4 inches (61 mm). Curb weight increased by approximately 100 to 150 lb (45 to 68 kg).

Making its debut on the new TSX was Honda's Advanced Compatibility Engineering body structure, which was designed to reduce accident impact on occupants. In the United States, the TSX came standard with luxury features like leather seat upholstery, dual-zone climate control, power driver's seat with memory, sunroof, Xenon headlights, and added a USB port music interface; in Canada this configuration was known as the "Premium Package" as there was a base trim available with the four-cylinder TSX that has cloth seats and halogen headlights, and without the USB connector, memory seat function, and fog lamps. The TSX had an optional technology package, which included a navigation system, real-time traffic and weather, and a 10-speaker premium sound system with DVD-audio capabilities.

For the United States, Acura also added a "Sport Wagon" body style of the TSX in late 2010 for the 2011 model year. The wagon was available with the I4 engine and 5-speed automatic.

In 2009, the 2010 model year TSX added an optional 3.5L 280 hp V6 engine, shared with the Acura TL, and which was not available for the CL-series Accord sold in Europe. It came standard with the five-speed automatic transmission with paddle shifters and 18-inch alloy wheels, and was available in either Premium or Technology trims.

In 2010, for the 2011 model year, the TSX received a facelifted upper grille with horizontal slots, a thin chrome molding surround replaced the wide silver surround, a redesigned front bumper cover with body-colored sections between the upper grille and each headlight, wider body-colored "verticals" in the lower grille separating revised foglamp areas, and a chrome trim piece added to the trunk lid between updated taillights. Inside included more LED lighting, new LED/VGA navigation screen and system functions with Technology Package, center console HVAC vents for rear occupants, and new trim colors, woodgrain, and metal finishes.

In 2011, for the 2012 model year, Acura introduced an all new Special Edition model. The exterior featured a more aggressive front spoiler giving it a sporty look, reminiscent of their old sports coupe, the RSX. Other cosmetic upgrades included a rear bumper fascia, side sills, and a "Special Edition" badge on the trunk lid. In the interior, Acura made sport-minded appointments including synthetic suede seat inserts with red backing. There was red stitching on the shift knob, seats, and steering wheel, along with red ambient lighting featured on the gauge cluster, overhead lighting, and footwell lighting. The pedals were also upgraded to aluminum.

In late 2013, Honda announced that the TSX would be replaced with the Acura TLX sedan and that they would discontinue sales of the TSX model in 2014.

=== Engine ===
The second-generation TSX uses a base engine similar to that of the first-generation TSX. The engine is a 2.4-liter in-line 4-cylinder engine reaching 201 hp (150 kW) and 172 lb⋅ft (233 N⋅m) torque. While the rated power of the new TSX engine is 4 hp (3.0 kW) lower than that of the 2008 model, Acura says the new engine distributes power across a much wider rpm range, which along with the increased torque, provides an increased feeling of power for the driver. The transmission choices remain 5-speed automatic and 6-speed manual, though the automatic version became equipped with steering-wheel paddle shifters for optional manual shifting.

In February 2009, for the 2010 model year, the Acura TSX has an optional 280 hp 3.5-liter V6, shared with the larger Acura TL, and which was not available for the CL-series Accord sold in Europe. The V6 engine is only available with the 5-speed automatic transmission.

The Acura TSX was slated to receive a high-performance 2.2-liter i-DTEC clean turbodiesel engine in the 2010 model year, after having already offered it for the CL-series Accord sold in Europe. However, it was later announced that Honda had abandoned its plans to bring diesel engines to the U.S. and Japan in favor of hybrid gasoline-electric powertrains.

=== TSX Sport Wagon (2011) ===
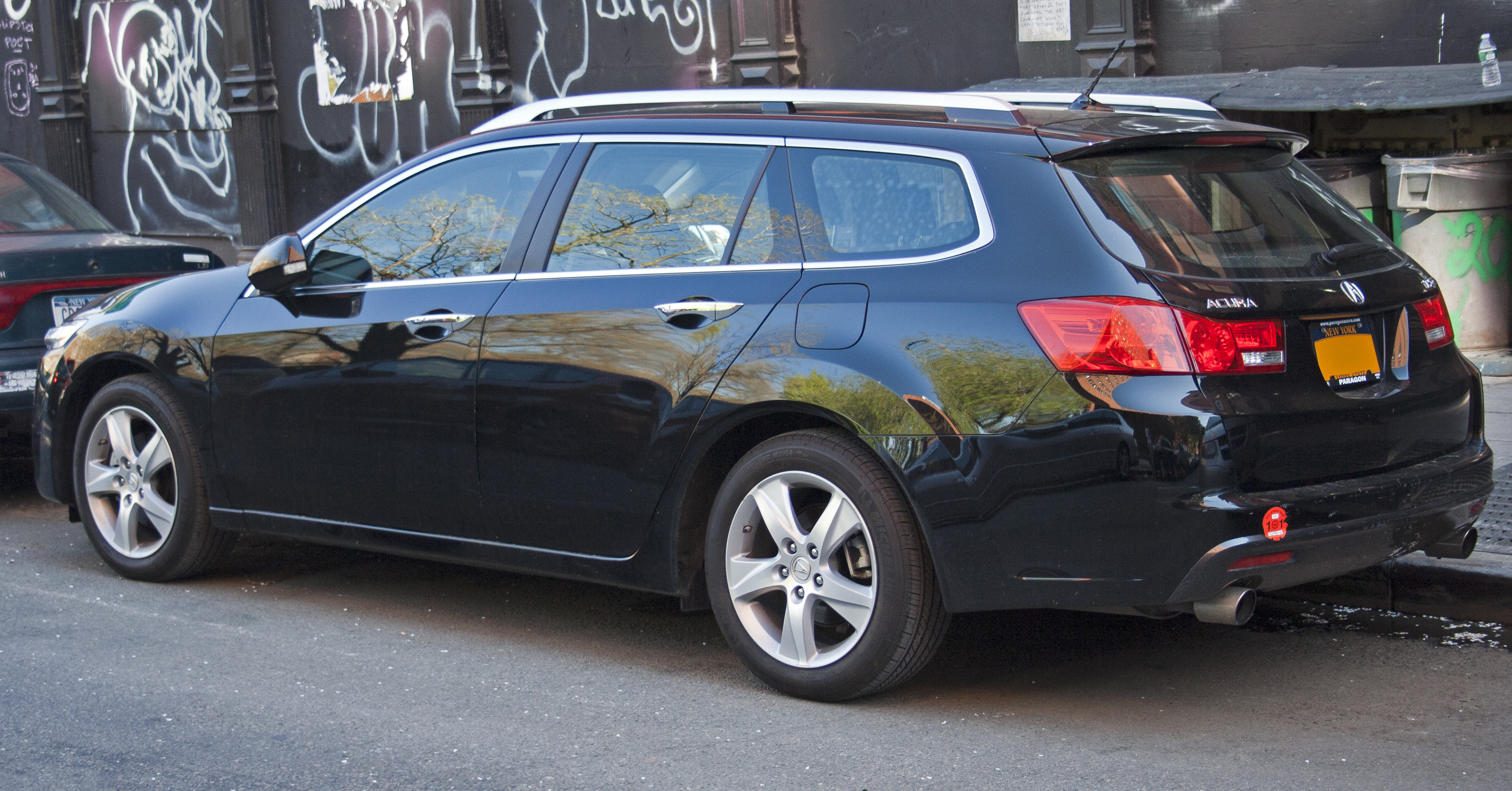
Acura TSX Sport Wagon

The Acura TSX Sport Wagon is a badge-engineered version of the CW-series Honda Accord Tourer station wagon. The Sport Wagon was unveiled in the 2010 New York Auto Show. The TSX Sport Wagon is mechanically identical to the TSX sedan, sharing the 201-horsepower Honda K engine 2.4L DOHC inline four-cylinder engine, Sequential SportShift 5-speed automatic transmission, and four-wheel independent sports suspension. Unlike the sedan, the Sport Wagon is not offered with the 6-speed manual transmission nor the V6 engine. The Sport Wagon offers 60.5 cu-ft of rear cargo area (with rear seats folded down; 25.8 cu-ft with the seats up), rear seats with 60/40 fold-down design.

For the United States market, the 2011 Acura TSX Sport Wagon went on sale on December 21, 2010 for the 2011 model year. Acura Canada said that they would eventually sell the TSX Sport Wagon, citing market conditions as the reason for the delay, but ultimately was never marketed in Canada. While the CW-series Honda Accord Tourer was quite successful in its market of Europe, station wagons were less popular in the United States. The competing Volkswagen Passat wagon and Mercedes C-Class wagons were withdrawn around the same time the TSX Sport Wagon was unveiled, leaving the BMW 3 Series Touring as the only wagon available in the entry-level luxury car category.

In September 2011, for the 2012 model year, the TSX Sport Wagon received a new compact tire repair kit allowed for a significantly larger underfloor storage area.

=== 2012 TSX Special Edition ===
The 2012 TSX Special Edition is a version of the TSX commemorating the 25th anniversary of Acura, with a 6-speed manual or Sequential SportShift 5-speed automatic transmission, a more aggressive front spoiler, rear bumper fascia and side sills, 17x7.5-inch 5-spoke aluminum wheels with a dark grey finish, a "Special Edition" badge on the trunklid, perforated black synthetic suede inserts and red backing upholstery, unique red stitching and red-lighting throughout the interior, aluminum pedal covers and a black headliner material replaces the standard grey headliner used on other TSX models.

The Technology package includes ELS audio system and hard-drive based navigation system.

The TSX Special Edition was unveiled in 2011 Orange County International Auto Show.

In Canada, a very similar model to the US model SE called the A-Spec was also released, sharing the same features as the American model. It had an A-Spec badge on each fender, and came with unique 18” multi spoke alloy wheels which were both silver and dark grey.

=== Safety ===
The Insurance Institute for Highway Safety (IIHS) found the 2009-11 TSX to have an overall driver death of 7 deaths per million registered years, the 2nd lowest of midsize four-door cars, and both single-vehicle crash death rate and rollover death rate of 0.

IIHS scores
Moderate overlap frontal offset	Good
Small overlap frontal offset	Marginal
Side impact	Good
Roof strength (2012–14)	Good

== Awards and recognition ==
- 2008 Wheels Car of the Year award winner.
- 2009 Car of the Year Finalist, Motor Trend.
- Ranked best resale value in the Sedan category in CNN's "Best Resale Value Cars" article on November 29, 2006.
- The Acura TSX was on Car and Driver's Ten Best list in its first three years of production (2004–2006).
- Top-Value Car of 2004 in the Category: Sedan under $35,000 from SmartMoney.com.
- It has received the "Frontal Five Star Rating" from the U.S. National Highway Traffic Safety Administration's frontal crash tests.
- "Best Pick" in a Frontal Impact from the Insurance Institute for Highway Safety.
- In November 2004, the TSX earned Consumer Reports' "Recommended" mark; in addition they named the car "Best Overall" in tests of four sporty sedans. In April 2007, the magazine rated the used TSX a "Good Bet."
- In the IIHS crash tests, the 2nd generation TSX received Good overall marks in both front and side impact crash tests and the Good score in all 14 measured categories. The IIHS gave the TSX its "Best Pick" accolade.
- Best upscale small car for families 2011, U.S. News & World Report.
- AutoPacific's most ideal midsized luxury car, 2012

== Racing ==
Realtime Racing prepares a factory TSX to compete in the SCCA Pro Racing World Challenge GTS class. The factory TSX is refashioned to be stiffer and lighter, and includes motor work with raised compression, and a custom built sequential transmission. Acura won the Manufacturer's Championship for the Touring class in 2005 with the RTR TSX, as well as the Driver's Championship for Peter Cunningham. Acura returned in 2006 and won the Manufacturers' Championship of the Speed World Challenge Touring Car class for the second year in a row, running both RSXs and TSXs. TSX drivers finished in 3rd and 4th in the Drivers' Championship. More success followed as Pierre Kleinubing won the Championship in 2007, and Peter Cunningham took it in 2008. Driving for RTR in 2009 was Peter Cunningham, Pierre Kleinubing, Toby Grahovic, Kuno Wittmer, and Jeff Courtney.

== Sales ==
Calendar year	US sales (sedan)	US sales (wagon)
2003	18,932	N/A
2004	30,365	N/A
2005	34,856	N/A
2006	38,035	N/A
2007	33,037	N/A
2008	31,998	N/A
2009	28,650	N/A
2010	31,950	126
2011	27,725	3,210
2012	24,631	4,234
2013	15,508	1,976
2014	5,647	640
2015	33	2

== References and footnotes ==
- "2004 Acura TSX Summary & Specs". Automotive.com.
- "Acura TSX Reviews & News". JB car pages.
