= Honda Racing =

Honda Racing can refer to one of the following:

- Honda Racing Corporation, Honda's Japanese motorsport subsidiary
- Honda Racing Corporation USA, Honda's American motorsport subsidiary
- Honda Racing F1, the Formula One four-wheel racing team
- Honda in motorsport, overview of Honda's motorsport activities
