= Brabham BT18 =

Open-wheel race car designed and built by Brabham

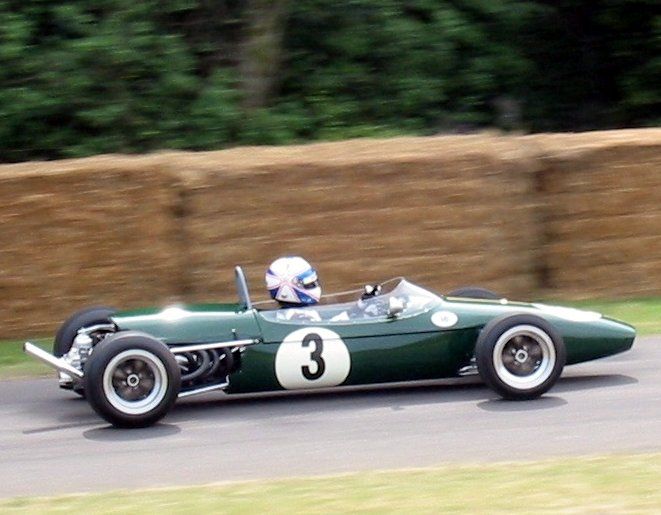
- Category: Formula 2 Formula 3
- Production: 1965; 46 cars built
- Predecessor: Brabham BT16
- Successor: Brabham BT23 (Formula 2); Brabham BT21 (Formula 3)

Technical specifications
- Engine: Honda RA300E/RA302E; Ford Kent Naturally-aspirated, 10,000 - 11,000 RPM

Competition history
- Notable drivers: (Australia) Jack Brabham (New Zealand) Denny Hulme
Wins	Podiums
12	22

The Brabham BT18 was an open-wheel formula racing car, designed, developed, and built by British constructor Brabham, for both Formula 2 and Formula 3 racing categories. Powered by a Honda engine, it won 11 out of 12 races in 1966.

== Design and development ==
The previous Brabham BT16 forerunner initially had a Cosworth SCA, BRM, or Holbay MAE engine. On 20 March 1965, at the Formula Two meeting at Silverstone, it was equipped with the Honda RA300E engine. Displacing 996.7 cc (60.82 cu in), the engine produced 135 bhp at 10,000 rpm.

The BT18 was designed as a Formula 2 and Formula 3 racing car. The car had a space frame that was reinforced by load-bearing plates. Two cars, F2-18-66 and F2-19-66, were used by the factory Brabham team with revised Honda RA302E engines, which now gave 150 bhp at 11,000 rpm. 32 were Formula 2 racing cars and designated BT18A. Six copies were equipped with a Cosworth SCA engine for private teams. A special version BT18B of 8 examples was fitted for the Honda Racing School with Ford Kent engines for the upcoming 1966 Formula Ford. A total of 46 examples of the BT18 (+A+B) were produced.

== Race history ==
In 1966, Jack Brabham and Denny Hulme achieved a total of 11 wins in 12 races with the Brabham-Honda BT18. Brabham won the 1966 Trophées de France championship and Hulme was runner-up.

=== F2 results ===
The European Formula Two Championship began in 1967 and the results for 1966, in which the works BT18 competed in, are made up of races in the British and French national championships and one-off F2 races.

Year	Driver	1^{*}	2	3	4	5	6	7	8	9	10	11	12	13	14
1966		(United Kingdom) Oulton Park	(United Kingdom) Goodwood	(France) Pau	(Spain) Montjuïc	(Belgium) Zolder	(United Kingdom) Crystal Palace	(France) Reims-Gueux	(France) Rouen-Les-Essarts	(Sweden) Karlskoga	(Finland) Keimola	(France) Linas-Montlhéry	(France) Bugatti Circuit	(France) Circuit d'Albi	(United Kingdom) Brands Hatch
1966	(Australia) Jack Brabham		1	1	1	1	1	1	Ret	1	1	1	Ret	1	2
1966	(New Zealand) Denny Hulme		2	2	3^{**}	2	2	Ret	1	2	2	3	1		
1966	(United Kingdom) Chris Irwin													3	Ret
1966		(United Kingdom) Round 1	(United Kingdom) Round 2	(France) Round 2	(Non-Championship)	(Non-Championship)	(United Kingdom) Round 3	(France) Round 2	(France) Round 3	(Non-Championship)	(Non-Championship)	(France) Round 4	(France) Round 5	(France) Round 6	(United Kingdom) Round 4

- * *Cancelled due to snowfall
- ** Used Cosworth SCA engine

=== F1 results ===
(key)

Year	Entrant	Engine	Tyre	Drivers	1	2	3	4	5	6	7	8	9	Points	WCC
1966	Caltex Racing Team	Cosworth SCA	D		MON	BEL	FRA	GBR	NED	GER	ITA	USA	MEX	—N/a	
1966	Caltex Racing Team	Cosworth SCA	D	(West Germany) Kurt Ahrens						Ret				—N/a	
1966	Roy Winkelmann Racing	Cosworth SCA	D	(West Germany) Hans Herrmann						11				—N/a	
1966	Roy Winkelmann Racing	Cosworth SCA	D	(United Kingdom) Alan Rees						Ret				—N/a	
