= Honda RA300E/RA302E engine =

Racing engine

Honda RA300E Honda RA302E
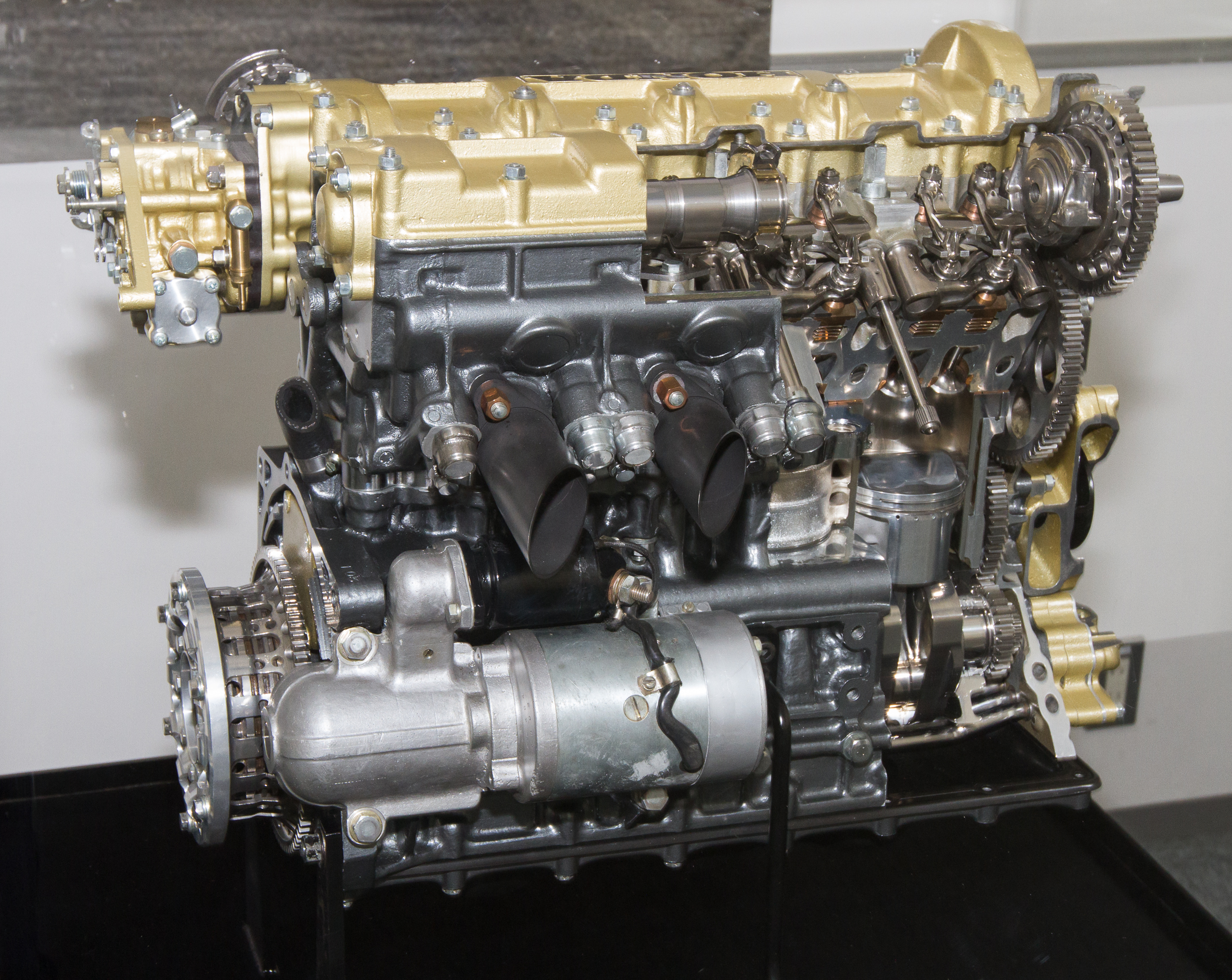

Overview
- Manufacturer: Honda
- Production: 1965-1966

Layout
- Configuration: Inline-4
- Displacement: 993–996 cc (60.6–60.8 cu in)
- Cylinder bore: 72–78 mm (2.8–3.1 in)
- Piston stroke: 52–61.2 mm (2.0–2.4 in)
- Valvetrain: 4-valve valves per cylinder, double overhead camshaft (DOHC)

Combustion
- Fuel system: Fuel injection
- Fuel type: Gasoline
- Cooling system: Water-cooled

Output
- Power output: 135–150 hp (101–112 kW)

Dimensions
- Dry weight: 145 kg (320 lb)

The Honda RA300E and Honda RA302E are 1 litre (61 cu in) four-stroke, four-cylinder, naturally-aspirated, racing engines, designed, developed and built by Honda, for Formula Two racing, in 1965.

== Development history ==
In 1963 Honda were seeking to build on their success in motorcycle racing by entering four-wheeled motorsport. Representatives of the company contacted journalist Jabby Crombac, who later mentioned it to Jack Brabham. Brabham met with Honda's Yoshio Nakamura and agreed a deal to run Honda engines in Formula Two.

== Race history ==
The first engines were delivered for the start of the 1965 Formula Two season. In this original form they produced 135 bhp at 10,000 rpm. One of the works' Brabham BT16 chassis was fitted to take the engine and would be driven by Brabham himself. The engine was not a success. Brabham regularly qualified near the back of the grid and retired three times out of four races. The engines went back to Honda for revision and Brabham continued with a Cosworth SCA in the interim. New engines were supplied for the last two races of the season. At the Oulton Park International Gold Cup, Brabham qualified eighth, but retired on the first lap with a broken clutch. However, at the Albi Grand Prix he qualified on pole, set fastest lap and finished just 0.6 seconds behind Jim Clark's dominant Lotus 35-Cosworth.

In 1966, in a new Brabham BT18 chassis, Brabham and teammate Denny Hulme were practically unbeatable with the revised engines, now producing 150 bhp at 11,000 rpm. Out of thirteen events, Brabham won ten and Hulme two, with eleven poles and twelve fastest laps between them, and seven 1-2 finishes. Brabham subsequently won the 1966 Trophées de France championship.

For 1967 the Formula Two rules were changed and the engine limit increased to 1600cc. Honda's Formula Two involvement came to an end and the engines were returned to the company.
