= Honda in motorsport =

Motorsport activities of Honda

Honda has been competing in a variety of racing series through the years, including Formula One, IndyCar, touring car racing, sports car racing and MotoGP. Currently they are involved in Formula One, MotoGP, Super GT, Super Formula, IndyCar, IMSA, BTCC, TC2000, Formula 3, Formula 4, off-road, WSBK, EWC, MXGP, TrialGP and various different GT3 and TCR series. All of Honda's motorsport activities are managed by Honda Racing Corporation (HRC).

== Early history ==
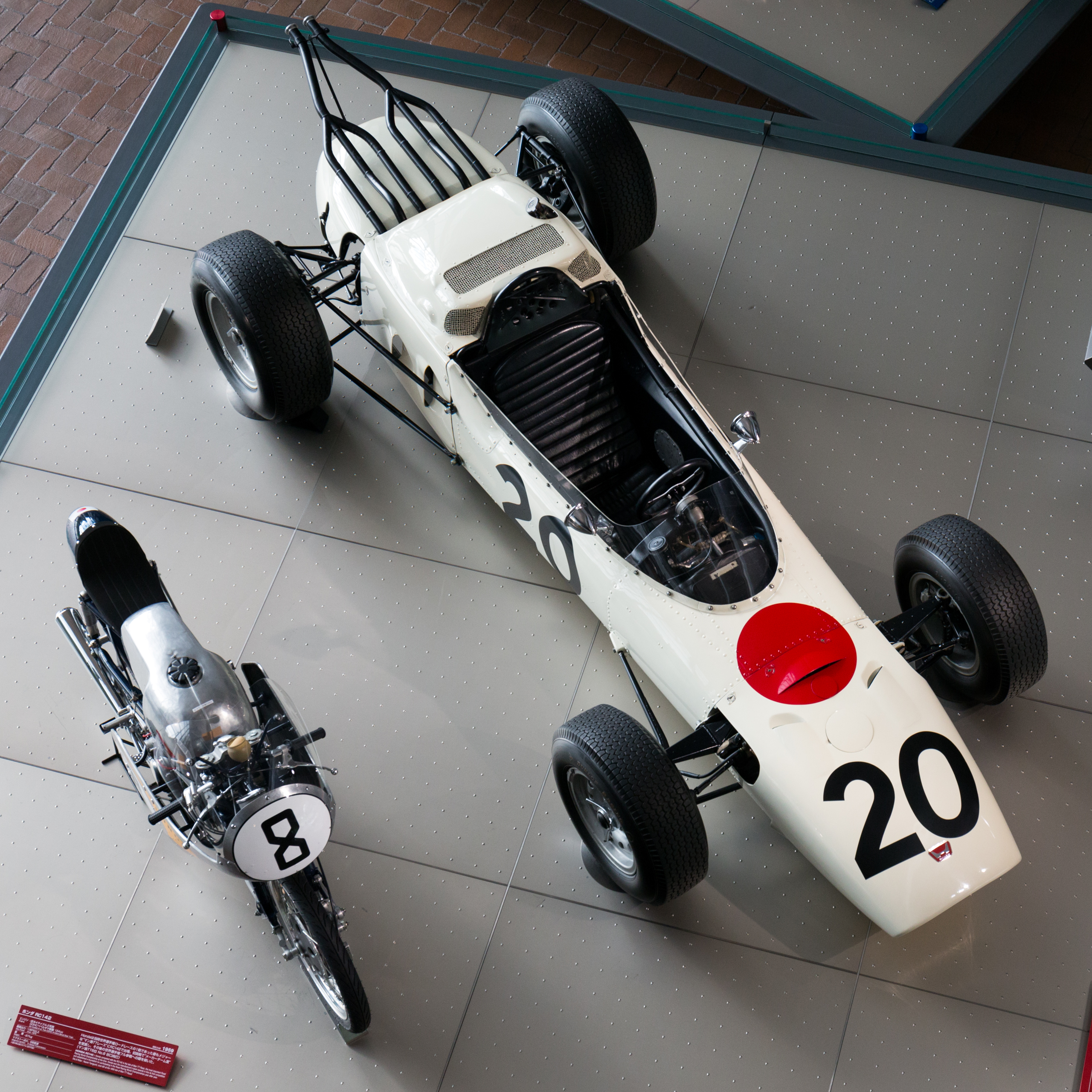
Honda's first Formula One and Motorcycle Grand Prix vehicles

In 1954 the founder of Honda, Soichiro Honda, declared that the company would enter the Isle of Man TT in Grand Prix motorcycle racing. The machines were being developed for the next five years, and they would enter the event in 1959 with the RC142 bike. They took 6th, 7th, 8th and 11th place in the race, capturing the Manufacturers' Team Award. In 1961, Honda would take victories at the Isle of Man TT, as Mike Hailwood won two of the races with Honda. They would also win the 250cc and 125cc class titles in the 1961 World Grand Prix season.

In 1962, Soichiro Honda decided to enter Formula One. After a few years of development, they would make their debut at the 1964 German Grand Prix with the RA271. With the Honda RA272, Richie Ginther would take Honda's first Formula One victory at the 1965 Mexican Grand Prix.

The Japanese Grand Prix started at the Honda-owned Suzuka Circuit in 1963. In 1964, Honda S600 cars were entered for the race and dominated the 1000cc and below class. Honda established the Racing Service Club (RSC) in 1965 within the Suzuka Circuit, providing a sports tuning service. A Honda S800 RSC won the GT-1 class in the 1968 12 Hours of Suzuka, impressively finishing third overall, ahead of cars with more than three times the S800 RSC's engine displacement, such as the Toyota 2000GT.

== Formula One ==
=== 1964–1968 ===
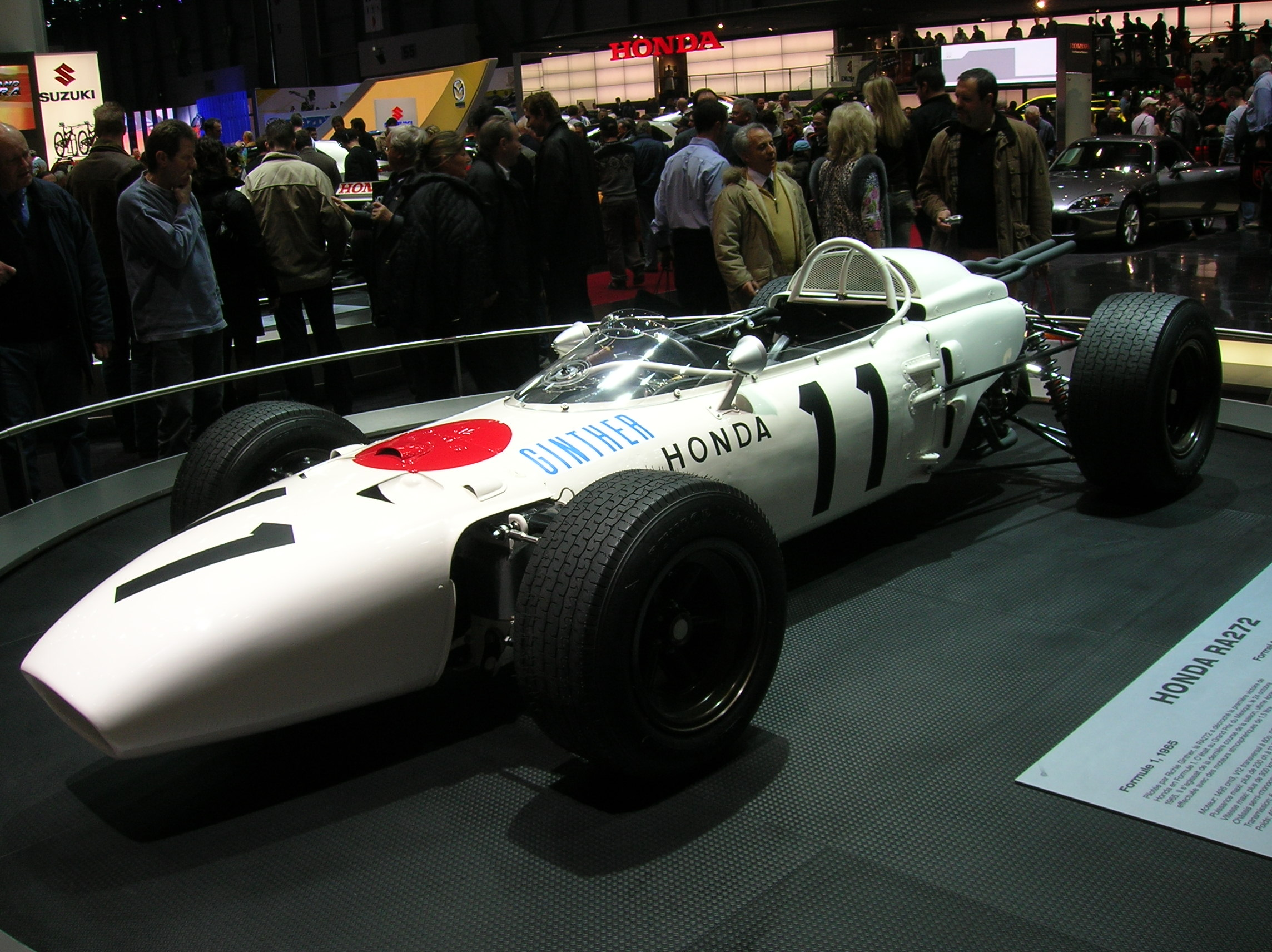
1965 Honda RA272, the first Japanese car to win in Formula One

Honda first entered Formula One in 1964 with their RA271 model, just four years after making their first road cars. The RA271 became the first Japanese car to race in Formula One and it made its debut at the 1964 German Grand Prix, driven by Ronnie Bucknum. Honda entered the full 1965 season with the RA272, and Richie Ginther joined Bucknum as the drivers. The highlight of the season was when Ginther dominated the Mexican Grand Prix, leading from start to finish to win the race. It was the first Formula One victory for a Japanese car and Honda.

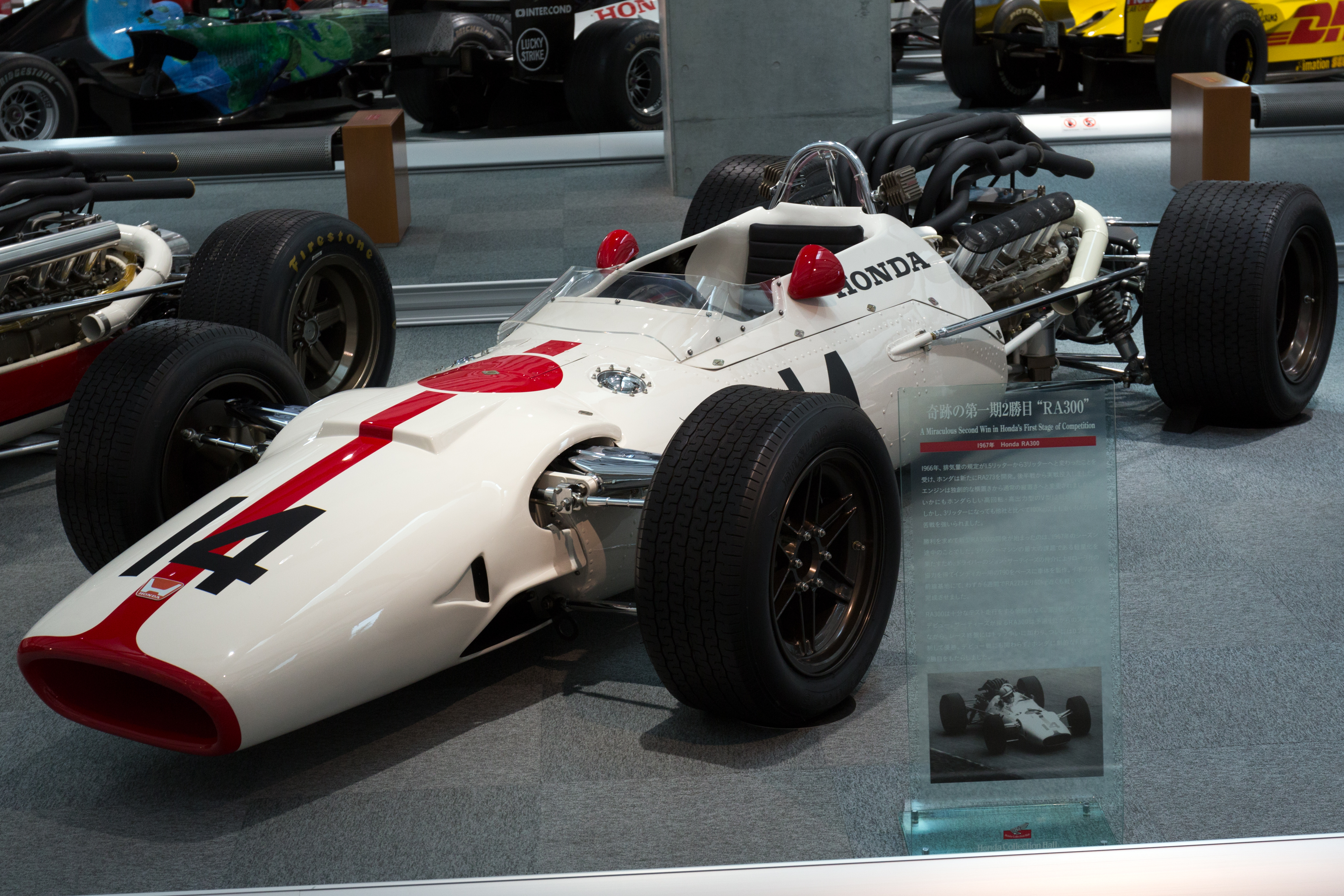
The 1967 Honda RA300 won the Italian Grand Prix.

Honda debuted the RA273 at the seventh round of the 1966 season and it had a brand new 3.0L V12 due to the new regulations. The car was used for the first seven races of 1967 and achieved a podium at the South African Grand Prix. John Surtees was Honda's only driver in 1967, and won the Italian Grand Prix with the RA300. It was the car's debut race. Surtees finished the season fourth in the drivers' championship and Honda finished fourth in the constructors' championship, despite having only one driver during the season.

The RA301, introduced at the second round of 1968, was an upgraded version of the RA300. Honda focused on developing the RA302. When it was ready for the French Grand Prix, John Surtees refused to drive it because he thought it was too unsafe. Instead it was driven by Jo Schlesser, but unfortunately he suffered a fatal accident and the car was never raced again. Surtees finished the race second in the RA301 in what was the team's best result that year. Later in the year Surtees scored a pole position at the Italian Grand Prix and a podium at the United States Grand Prix. Honda left Formula One at the end of the season.

=== 1983–1992 ===
Honda returned to Formula One in 1983 as an engine manufacturer, supplying engines to the Spirit team. By the end of 1983, Honda started its association with the Williams team. Honda stopped supplying engines to Spirit for 1984, but the Williams partnership continued. The Honda engines showed good performance, but were unreliable. Also, the Williams chassis – that was designed for much less power – had a hard time with the power of the turbocharged Honda engines. Keke Rosberg won the Dallas Grand Prix in 1984 to give Honda their first win since their return, but a lot of retirements left Williams-Honda sixth in the constructors' championship.

Honda started 1985 with upgraded versions of the RA164E from 1984. A completely new RA165E engine was introduced at the Detroit Grand Prix with a much smoother power delivery, and the team were quickly on the pace as Rosberg won the race. Williams-Honda won the last three races of the season to finish fourth in the constructors' championship with the same number of points as the third placed constructor.

The new RA166E for 1986 picked up on the momentum of 1985 and was both very powerful and reliable. Williams-Honda won the constructors' championship with nine wins. The drivers' title slipped away to the consistent Alain Prost of McLaren-TAG, after Nigel Mansell's tyre blew up at the last race. It was Honda's first title in Formula One.

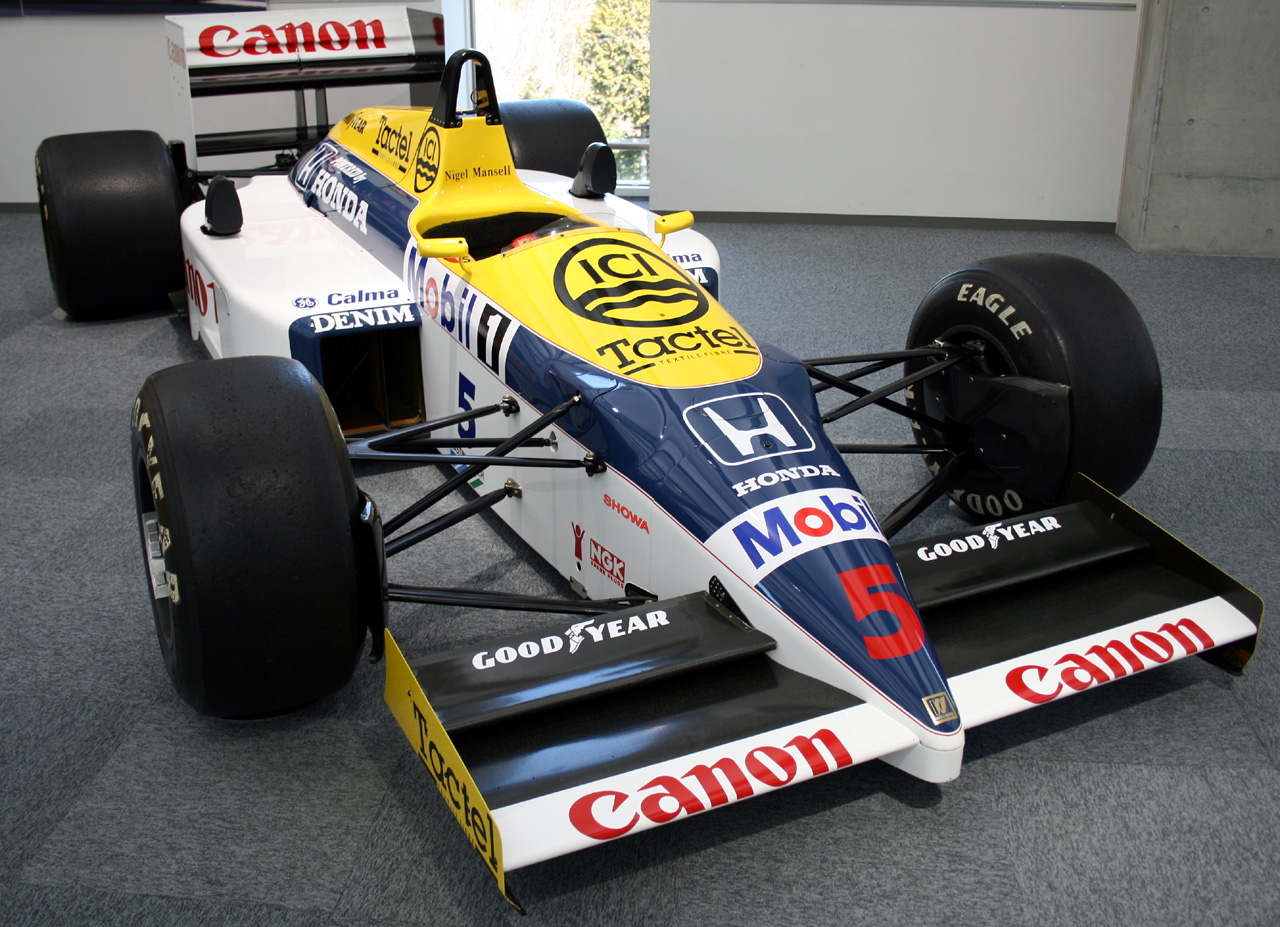
The 1986 Williams-Honda FW11

Honda started supplying Lotus in 1987 after they signed Honda's test driver, Satoru Nakajima, but they used the RA166E from the previous year due to Williams' exclusive deal of the new RA167E. The season also started Honda's relationship with Ayrton Senna, who drove for the Lotus team. Honda engines dominated the season, taking 11 wins and 13 pole positions out of sixteen races. Nelson Piquet won the drivers' championship ahead of other Honda-powered drivers in second and third, while Williams-Honda won the constructors' championship.

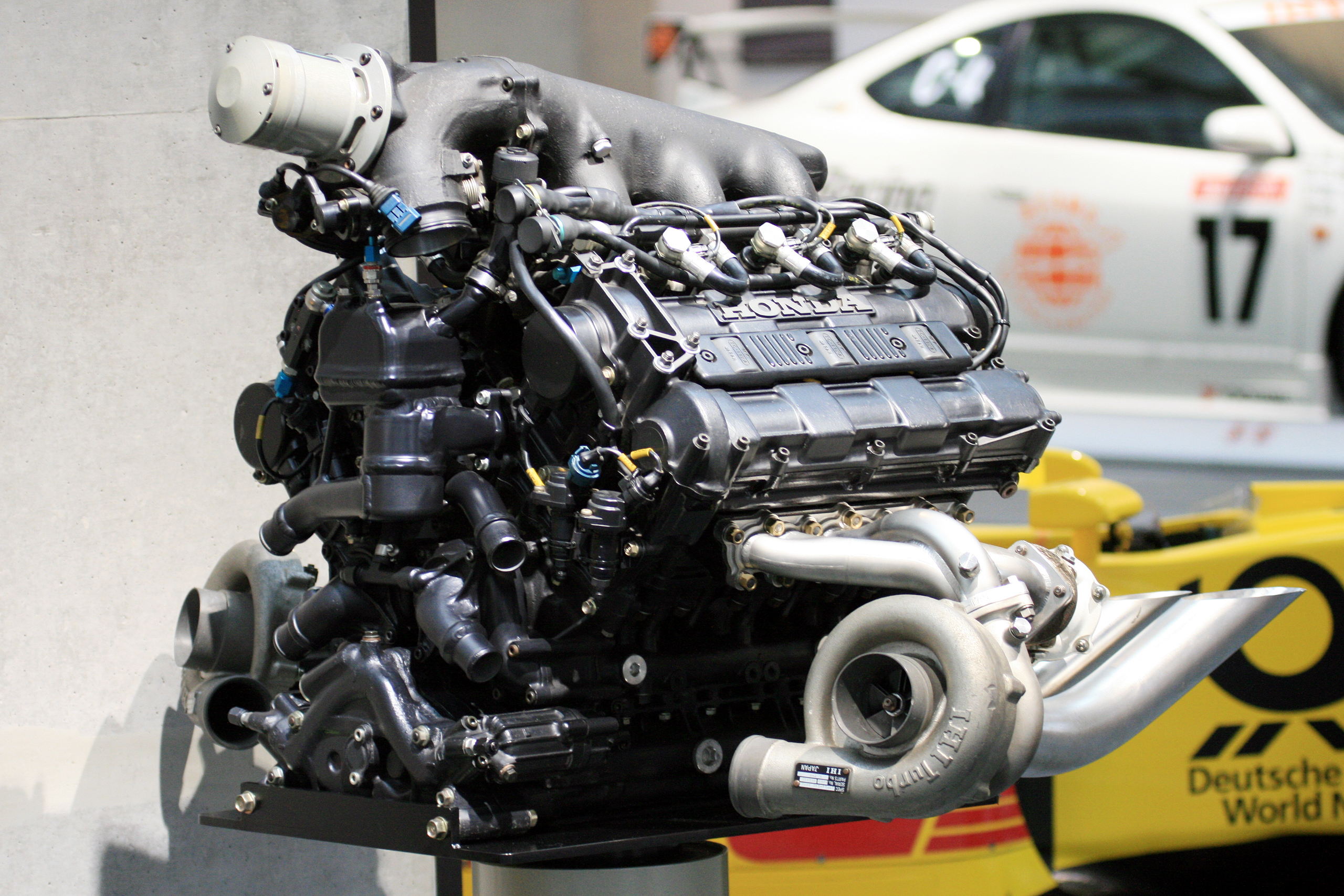
The 1988 Honda RA168E

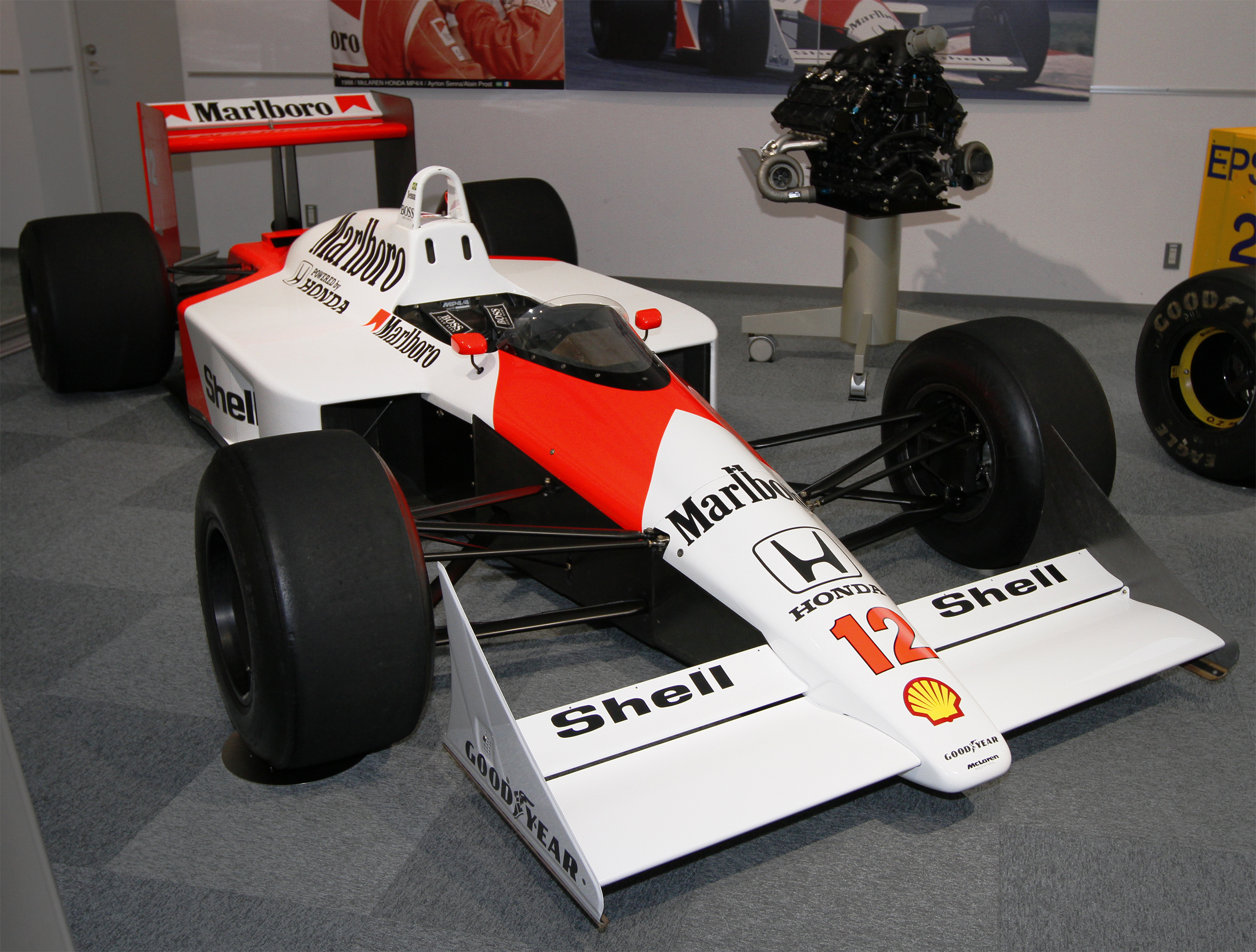
The 1988 McLaren-Honda MP4/4

For 1988, Honda made a deal to supply engines to McLaren, ending the deal with Williams. 1988 was going to be the final year of turbo engines in F1 and unlike most, Honda built a new engine called the RA168E, to comply with the new rules for 1988. The McLaren-Honda cars, driven by Ayrton Senna and Alain Prost, were completely dominant, taking 15 wins and pole positions from 16 races. Senna won the Drivers' Championship after winning at Honda's home race in Suzuka, and McLaren-Honda won the Constructors' Championship with more than three times the points of second placed Ferrari.

Honda introduced a naturally aspirated 3.5L V10 for the new regulations in 1989. It didn't stop the domination as the team scored 10 wins and 15 pole positions from 16 races. McLaren-Honda won the constructors' championship and Prost the drivers' title ahead of Senna. The V10 was retained for 1990 and the team won the constructors' title again, while Senna won the drivers' title.

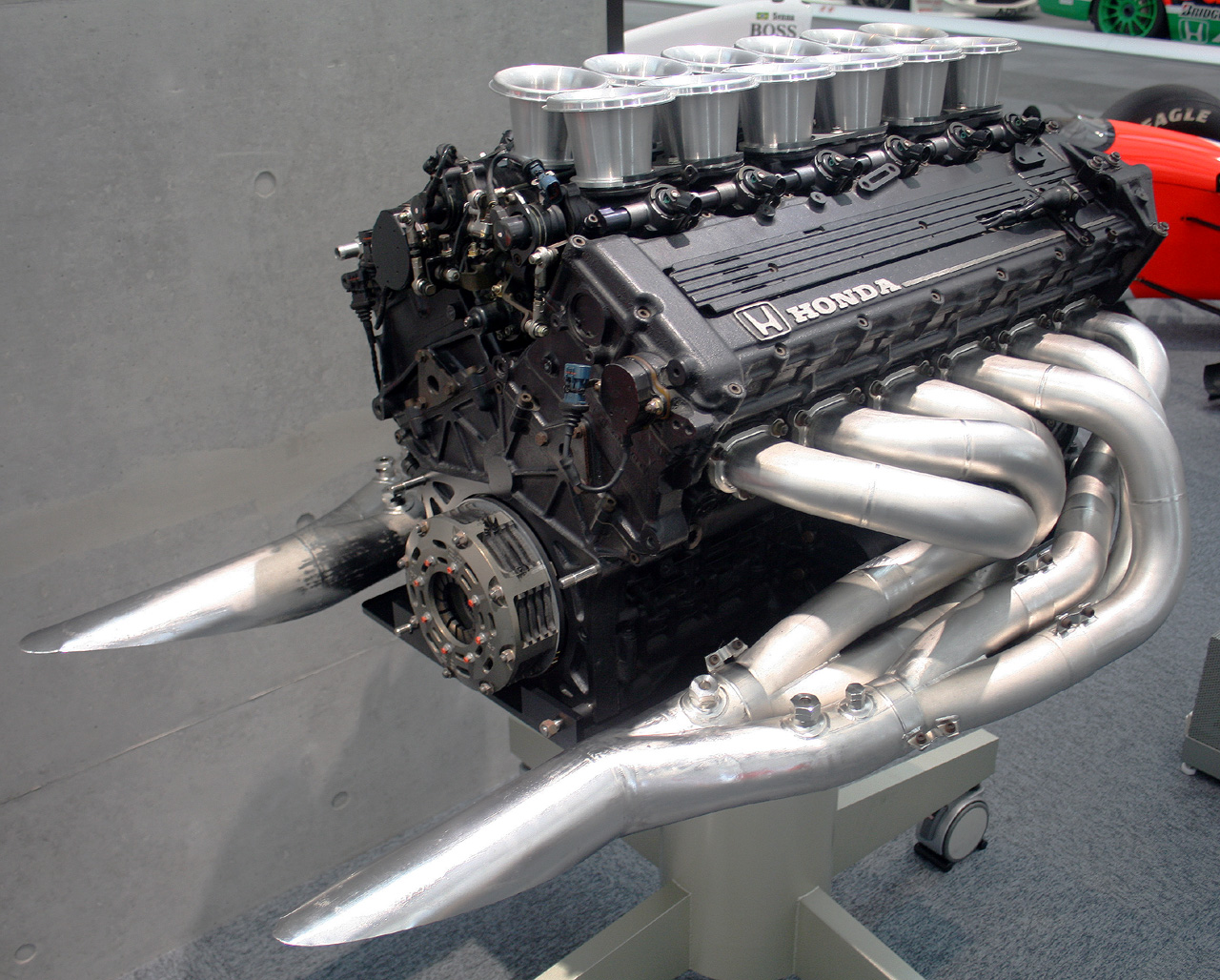
The 1991 Honda RA121E

A new 3.5L V12 was introduced for 1991. The season started well with four consecutive wins, but by mid-season the team couldn't match the performance of the Williams-Renault's. Honda and McLaren introduced upgrades that made the team really competitive again to win the constructors' and drivers' championships.

Honda announced that they would leave after 1992, having achieved their goals. McLaren-Honda finished 2nd in the constructors' standings after Gerhard Berger won the last race of the season. The closely related Mugen company stayed in the sport between 1992 and 2000, winning four races and achieving a best result of 3rd in the constructors' championship in 1999 with the Jordan team.

=== 2000–2008 ===
Honda returned in 2000, supplying engines to BAR. They finished 5th in the standings. BAR-Honda's best season was 2004, when Jenson Button and Takuma Sato took 11 podiums for the team to finish 2nd in the constructors' championship.

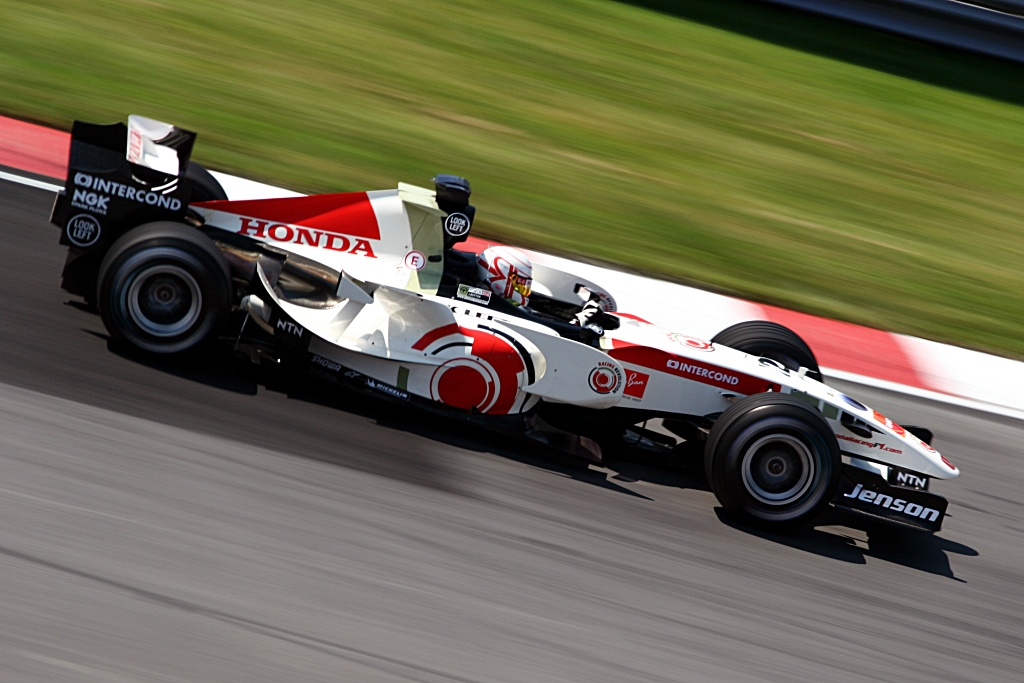
Button driving the Honda RA106

Honda fully bought BAR in 2005 and it became the Honda team for 2006. The team had a decent start to the season, but a performance slump mid-season led to car designer Geoff Willis leaving the team. The inexperienced Shuhei Nakamoto replaced him. However, things started to improve after the French GP, Honda having a strong run of points finishes and most notably, Jenson Button winning the Hungarian Grand Prix. Button scored more points in the last six races of the season than any other driver to help Honda finish fourth in the constructors' championship.

After two difficult seasons in 2007 and 2008, which only featured one podium finish by Rubens Barrichello, Honda left Formula One after the 2008 season due to the global economic crisis.

=== 2015–2021 ===
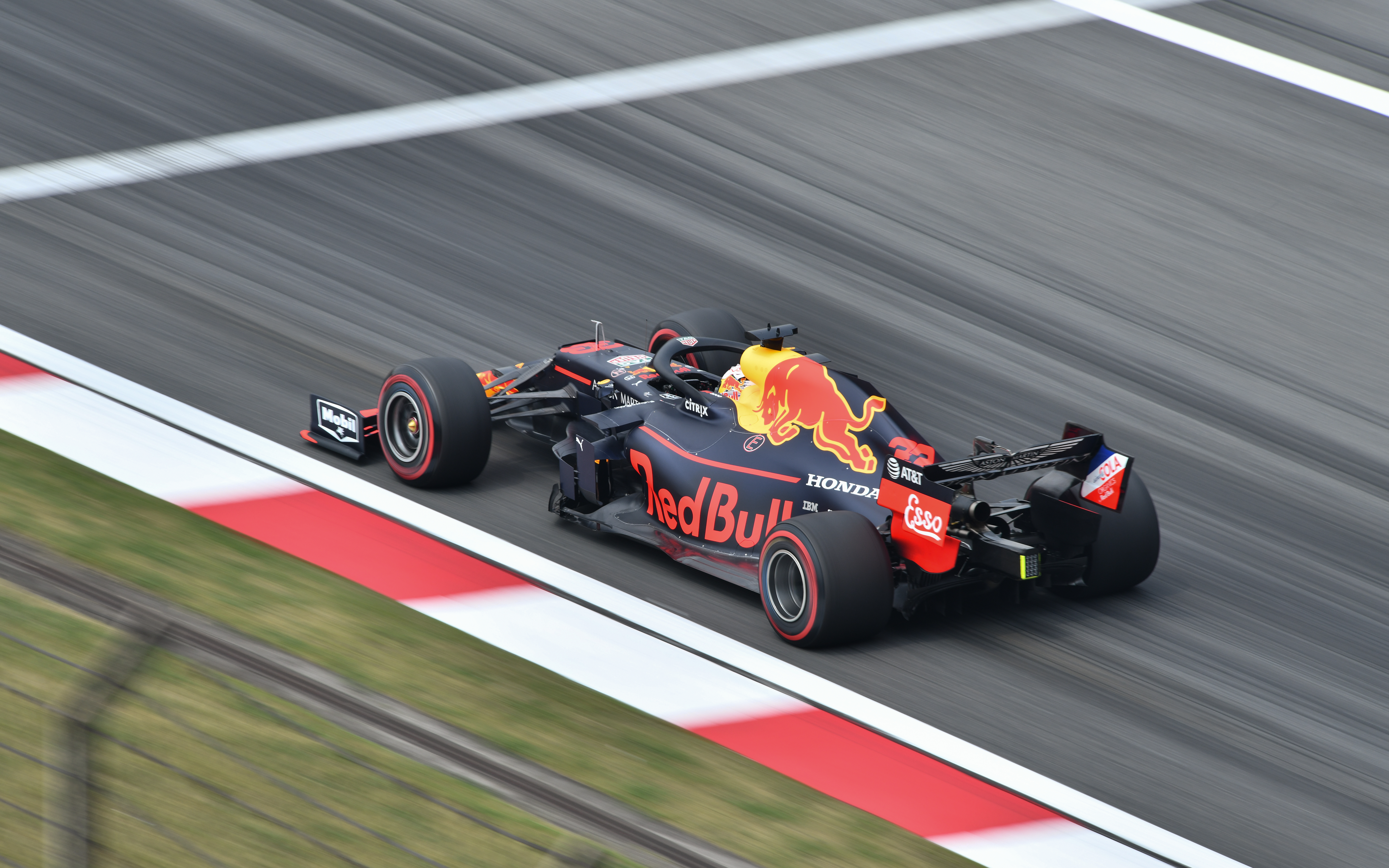
Verstappen driving the Honda-powered Red Bull RB15

Honda returned in 2015 as an engine manufacturer, supplying turbocharged 1.6L V6 hybrid power units to the McLaren team. The partnership was a big disappointment, McLaren and driver Fernando Alonso regularly criticizing the power unit. McLaren and Honda split after the 2017 season, having achieved a best result of 6th in the constructors' standings in 2016.

Honda signed a deal to supply Toro Rosso for 2018. In the second race of the season at Bahrain, Pierre Gasly finished fourth to give Honda its best result since returning in 2015, at the time. After a fairly successful season, Toro Rosso's sister team Red Bull Racing agreed to also use Honda power units in 2019. The season started with Max Verstappen scoring Honda's first podium of the V6 turbo-hybrid era at the Australian Grand Prix. At the Austrian Grand Prix, Verstappen finally scored Honda's first victory of the V6 turbo-hybrid era and their first since 2006, with another victory at the Brazilian Grand Prix. In 2020, Honda enjoyed further success, with Max Verstappen winning the 70th Anniversary Grand Prix at Silverstone. A shock win at the Italian Grand Prix with Pierre Gasly, who was promoted to Red Bull then demoted back to Scuderia AlphaTauri (rebranded from Scuderia Toro Rosso), made Honda the first engine manufacturer in the V6 turbo-hybrid era to win with two teams. Verstappen won the Abu Dhabi Grand Prix, the last race of the season.

Despite their upward momentum under the Red Bull/AlphaTauri partnership, Honda announced in October 2020 that they would be ending its F1 engine program at the end of the 2021 season. Honda's CEO Takahiro Hachigo said that the decision was not based the effects of the COVID-19 pandemic, but Honda's commitments to zero-carbon technologies like fuel cells batteries.

== Touring cars ==
=== Japanese Touring Car Championship ===
==== 1985–1993: Group A era (JTC) ====
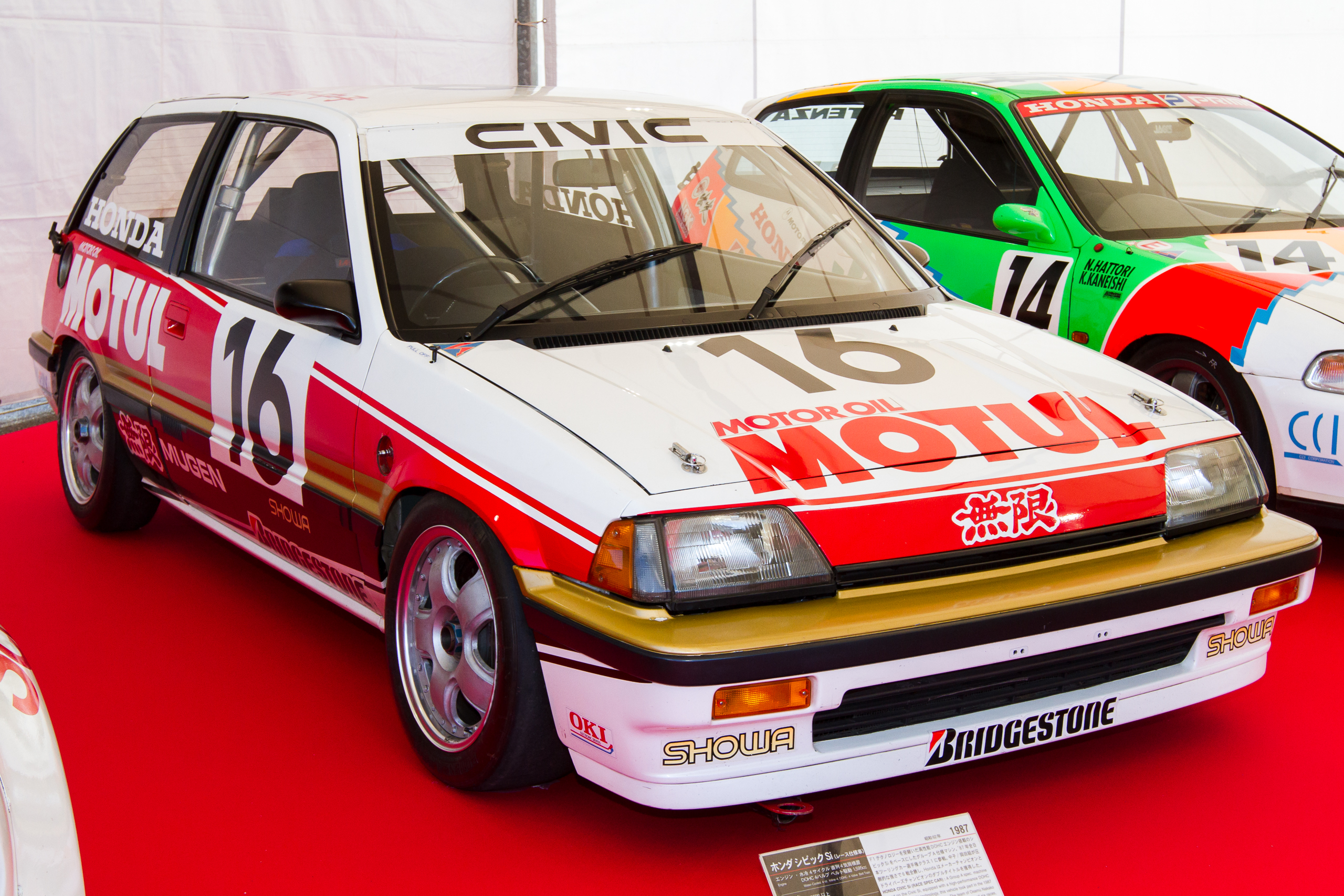
In 1987, the Mugen-run Civic Si won all races in its class and accumulated more overall points than any other entry across all races.

Honda entered the Japanese Touring Car Championship (JTC) during the third round of its inaugural season in 1985, fielding an E-AT Civic modified to Group A regulations by Mugen with technical support from Honda R&D. Competing in the sub-1,600 cc division (JTC-3), the car secured a class pole position on its debut. In the following round at Suzuka, the Team Mugen entry, driven by Satoru Nakajima and Osamu Nakako, claimed the overall pole position and race win, finishing ahead of all competitors from the two higher displacement classes. The team concluded the season at Fuji with a third-place finish after starting from the class pole.

Additional teams entered Civics for the 1986 season, including the Toyo Tires-backed Object T team, whose drivers Kaoru Ito and Tomohiko Tsutsumi won the drivers' title with four podium finishes despite securing no race victories. Team Mugen achieved four pole positions but recorded Honda's only race win of the year in the opening round, failing to finish the remaining events. Consequently, Honda lost the manufacturers' championship to Toyota.

In 1987, the Mugen Civic won all six races of the season, securing Honda's first manufacturers' championship, while Nakako and Hideki Okada won the drivers' title. The Mugen Civic also recorded three overall second-place finishes against higher displacement machinery and accumulated more overall points than any other entry across all races.

The E-AT was replaced by the new EF3 Civic for the 1988 season. Honda won its second manufacturers' title by securing five victories across six rounds—consisting of two wins each by Mugen and Nakajima Planning, and one by Object T—while Nakako and Okada retained the drivers' championship. In 1989, the EF3 Civic won four of the six rounds, allowing Honda to retain the JTC-3 manufacturers' title. The JTC-3 drivers' championship, however, went to Kazuo Mogi and Sakae Obata driving a Toyota Corolla Levin.

The 1990 season marked a transition with the introduction of the EF9 Civic, which brought Honda's B16A engine to the series. The integration of the new powerplant required adjustments to the transmission and mounting layouts, which had originally been engineered for the older ZC engine. These modifications caused temporary reliability issues that delayed the implementation of the VTEC system until later in the year. Despite these complications, the EF9 platform secured three class victories to defend Honda's manufacturers' title in 1990. By 1991, the EF9 operation stabilized, and the Mugen driver pairing of Nakako and Okada reclaimed the JTC-3 drivers' championship.

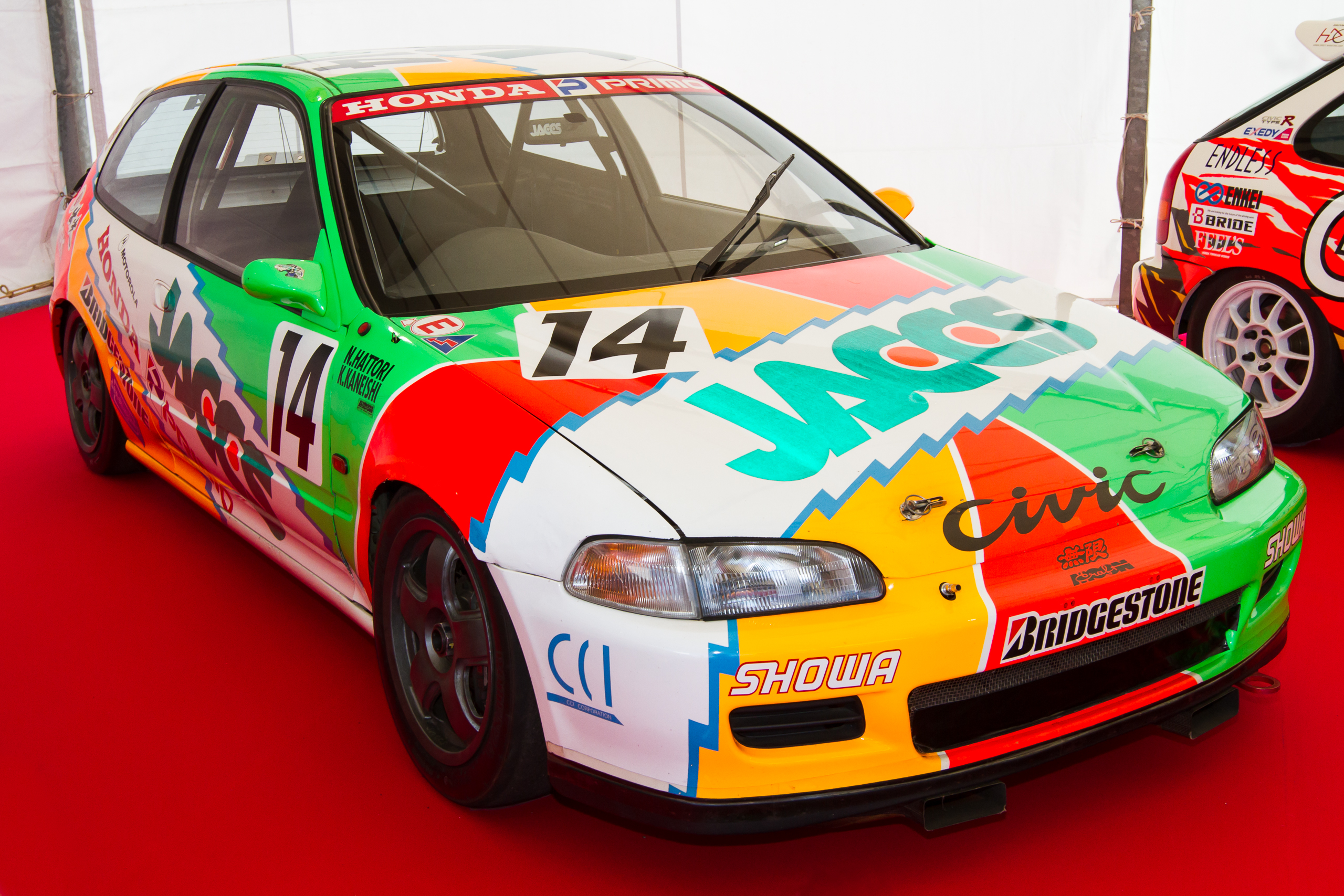
The 1993 JTC-3 championship-winning EG6 Civic SiR

Honda introduced the fifth-generation EG6 Civic SiR during the second half of the 1992 season to replace the EF9. Equipped with an updated version of the B16A engine, the EG6 secured the manufacturers' title for Honda, while Nakako and Okada won another drivers' championship for Mugen. The 1993 season was the final year of the JTC under Group A regulations. The EG6 Civic won the JTC-3 division, with the Mooncraft-prepared JACCS Civic driven by Naoki Hattori and Katsutomo Kaneishi winning the drivers' championship. By the conclusion of the final round at Fuji, Honda had secured its seventh consecutive JTC-3 manufacturers' title (1987–1993).

==== 1994–1997: Super Touring era (JTCC) ====
In 1994, the championship transitioned to FIA Class II (Super Touring) rules, and the series was now abbreviated as JTCC. The new regulations mandated four-door sedan body styles powered by naturally aspirated engines with a maximum displacement of 2.0 liters. To comply with the new rules, Honda retired the three-door EG6 hatchback and introduced the four-door Civic Ferio (EG9). The car was campaigned by several factory-supported operations, including Mugen, Mooncraft, Nakajima Planning, and Team Kunimitsu. Utilizing a 2.0-liter variant of the B18C engine, the relatively small body size of the Civic Ferio limited the scope of modifications that could be made to the suspension and engine. Consequently, it often struggled to match its competitors; while it secured four podiums in 1994 and three in 1995, it failed to win a single race. Honda's highest-placed driver finished 7th in the 1994 standings and 13th the following season.

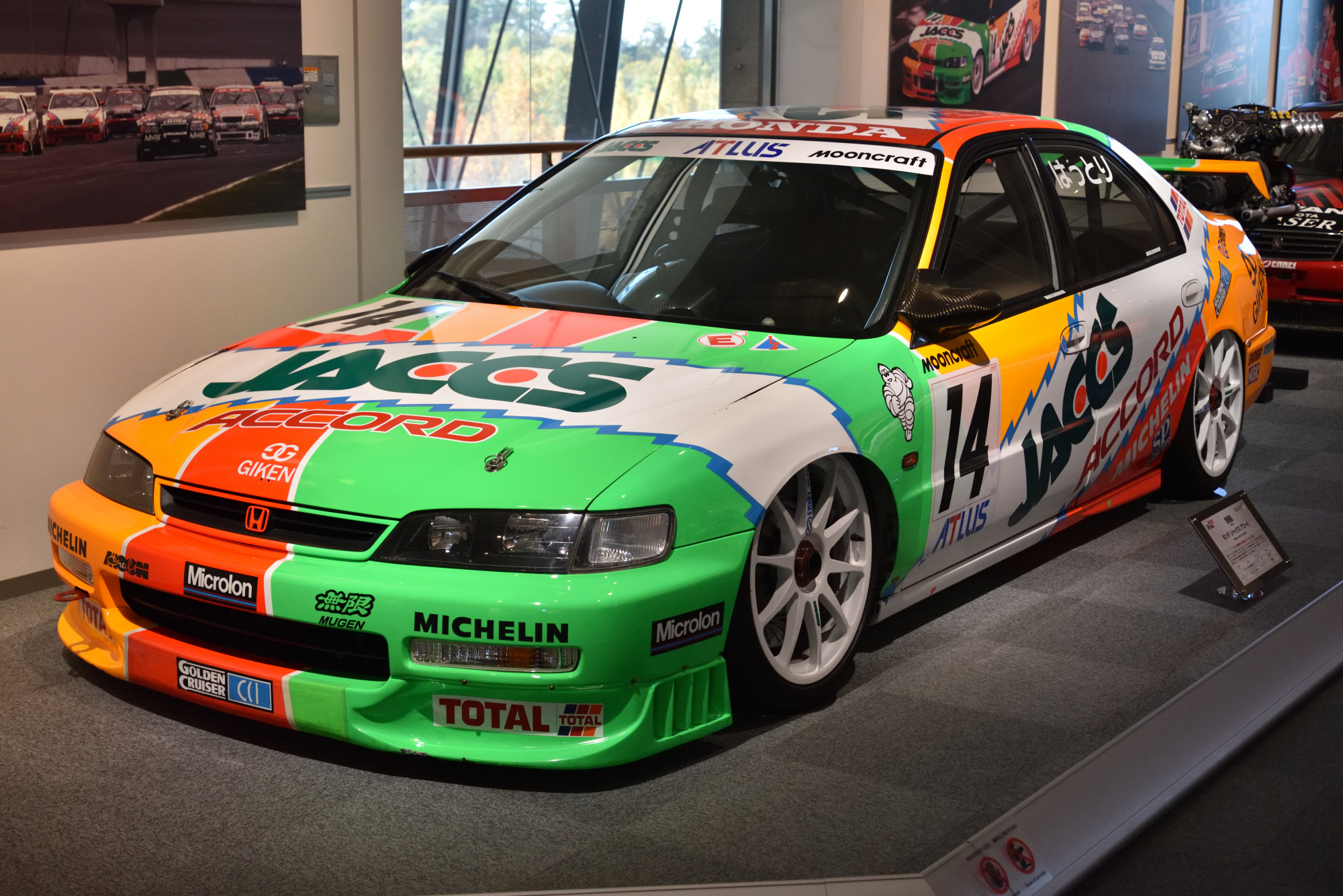
1996 JTCC winning Accord

For the 1996 season, Honda shifted its touring car program away from the Civic platform, introducing the fifth-generation Accord (CD6 chassis) across all factory teams. The JTCC-spec Accord, whose development was led by former F1 engineer Toru Kitamoto with input from Ron Tauranac, featured advanced suspension architecture and a 2.0-liter H22A engine modified with a reverse-head configuration.

The Accord achieved immediate success in 1996, claiming 10 wins, 10 pole positions, and nine 1–2 finishes from 12 race entries. However, a minor design detail that was unlikely to affect performance led to disqualifications that stripped away two of those victories and one 1–2 finish. Honda also withdrew from two races mid-season to revise the suspension after rivals protested its legality. Naoki Hattori, driving the Mooncraft-entered JACCS Honda Accord, won the drivers' championship after securing five victories. His stablemate, Osamu Nakako, finished as the runner-up in the standings driving the Castrol Mugen Accord.

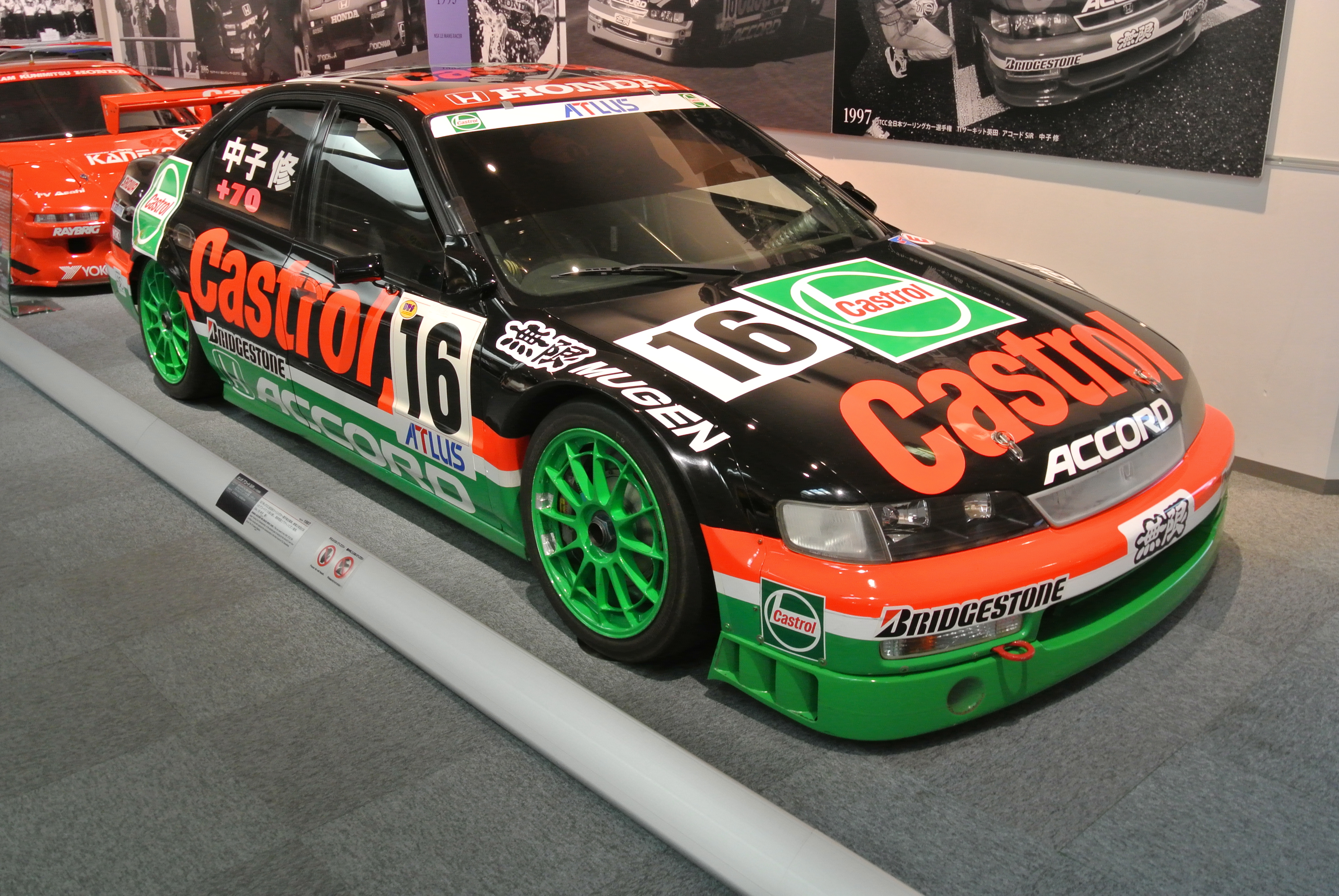
The Honda Accord with which Nakako became JTCC champion in 1997

Honda retained its leading position in the 1997 season, winning eight of the 14 races. The engine received several enhancements, while the track width was increased and the aerodynamics were modified to comply with slightly revised regulations. Osamu Nakako won the drivers' championship for Mugen, compiling four wins and two further podium finishes, although the title was secured after a clash with title rival Satoshi Motoyama of Nissan. Takuya Kurosawa finished second overall in the Nakajima-run entry, while the teams' title was won by Team Mugen Honda.

In September 1997, Honda announced it would leave the JTCC at the end of the season and redirect their resources toward the All-Japan GT Championship (JGTC) due to escalating development costs.

=== World Touring Car Championship ===
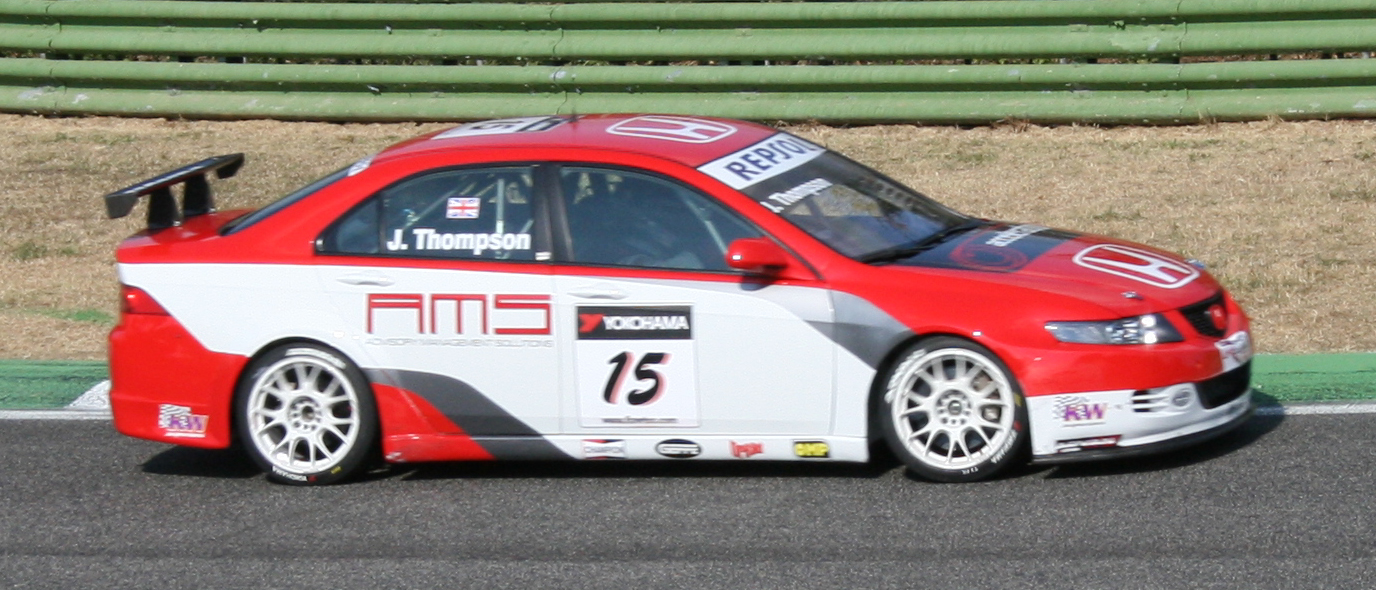
Thompson driving the Accord at Imola in 2008

Honda first participated in the World Touring Car Championship (WTCC) with the Accord from 2005 to 2008, although it was only used by privateer teams. It did still have some success as James Thompson won the Race of Europe at Imola in 2008.

In 2012, Honda announced that they will enter last three rounds of the 2012 season with a racer based on the European Civic hatchback, developed in a joint partnership with Mugen and JAS Motorsport. The car got its first podium at the Race of Macau that year, driven by Tiago Monteiro.

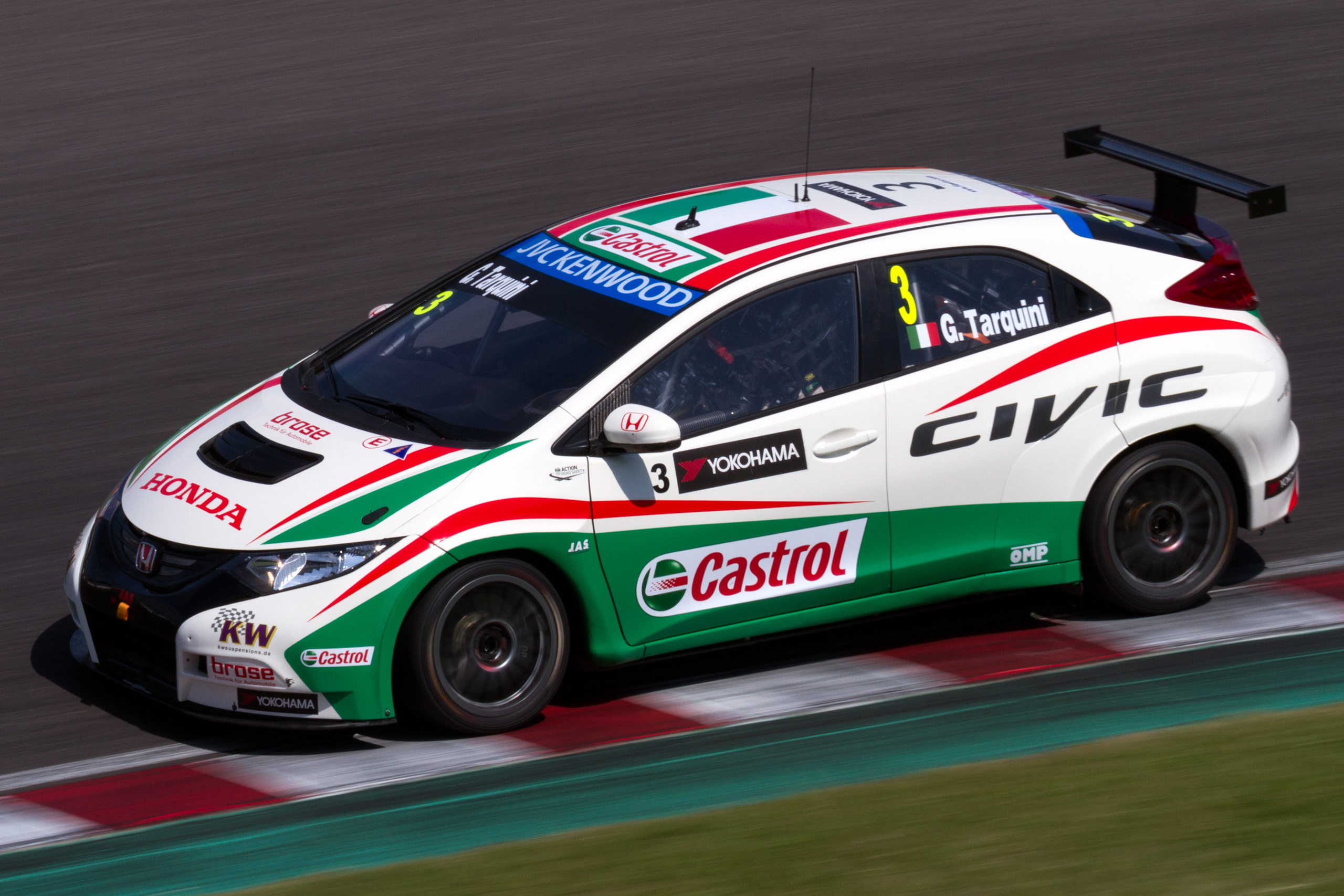
Honda won the Manufacturers' World Championship in 2013.

In 2013, Honda received Castrol as the title sponsor for their factory team, while Gabriele Tarquini joined the team as a driver alongside Tiago Monteiro. During its first full season in 2013, the Civic won four races, three pole positions and finished on the podium 20 times, helping Honda to win the Manufacturers' World Championship.

Following the introduction of new TC1 regulations, Citroën dominated the series between 2014 and 2016, aided by a significantly higher budget than the other manufacturers and years of experience of similar rules in the World Rally Championship. During this period Honda finished runner-up in the championship every year, and won more races than any other manufacturer apart from the aforementioned Citroën. Norbert Michelisz won the independents' title in 2015 with the Civic.

After Citroën left at the end of 2016, the championship was fought between Honda and Volvo in 2017. Honda and their driver Tiago Monteiro were leading the championships after 12 races, but Monteiro suffered a crash in testing which put him out of the remaining eight races. Then at the next round in China, all of the Hondas were disqualified due to fuel injectors that were not compliant with the technical regulations. After these setbacks, Honda went into the final round 12.5 points from the lead of the manufacturers' championship and their driver Norbert Michelisz 6.5 points away from the lead of the drivers' championship. The Honda was competitive at the last round in Qatar as Michelisz broke the lap record in practise, but he suffered a brake failure in qualifying which left him out of contention. Esteban Guerrieri, who replaced the injured Monteiro, took pole position and won the last race of the season. Honda ultimately missed out on their second title, although they had won more main races and pole positions than any other manufacturer during the season. The WTCC was discontinued after the season due to low interest in the TC1 regulations.

=== British Touring Car Championship ===
It was in 1995 that Honda first joined the British Touring Car Championship (BTCC). The car they used was the Accord. David Leslie got Honda's first podium at Oulton Park that year, but they only finished seventh in the manufacturers' championship. 1996 was more successful as Leslie took three wins and finished fourth in the drivers' championship.

In 1997, the team was run by Prodrive, instead of MSD, and the drivers were James Thompson and Gabriele Tarquini. Honda finished third in the manufacturers' championship that year and Robb Gravett won the independent's championship in a Honda Accord. Peter Kox replaced Tarquini for 1998. James Thompson finished third in the championship with four wins in 1998.

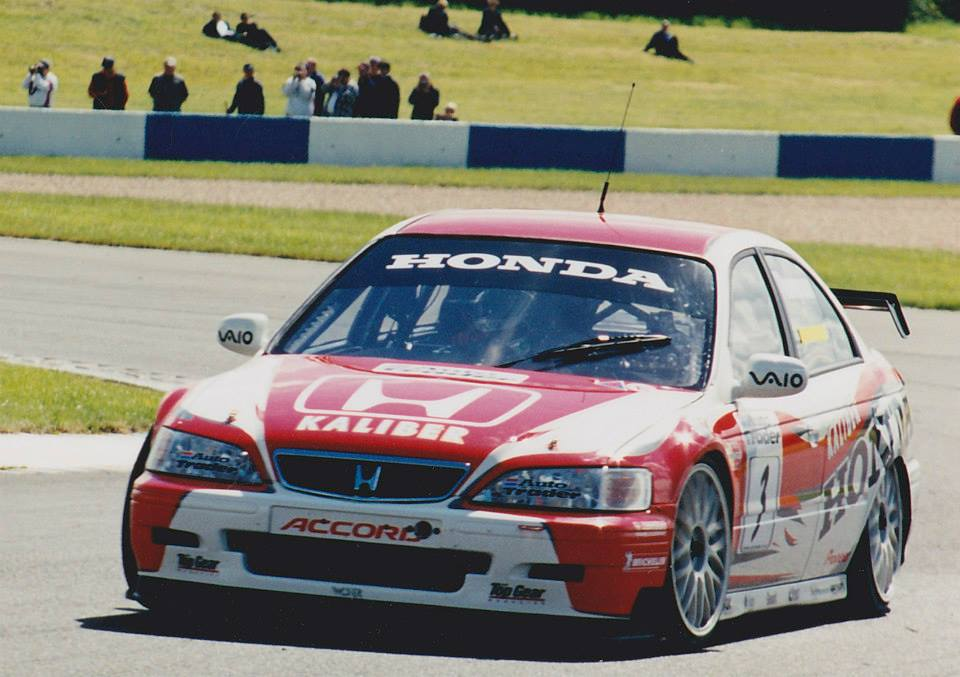
Thompson driving the Accord in 1999

WSR replaced Prodrive in running the Honda team for 1999. The same driver line-up from 1998 was retained, though Gabriele Tarquini raced in two rounds. Honda finished second in the manufacturers' championship with five wins in 1999. 2000 was the final BTCC season using the Super Touring regulations and the teams expanded to three drivers. Thompson was joined by Tom Kristensen and Tarquini. They won seven races, including the final race of the Super Touring era which was won by Kristensen. Honda finished second in the manufacturers' championship.

The Honda Civic Type R was used between 2002 and 2004, achieving 14 wins and a best result of second in the manufacturers championship.

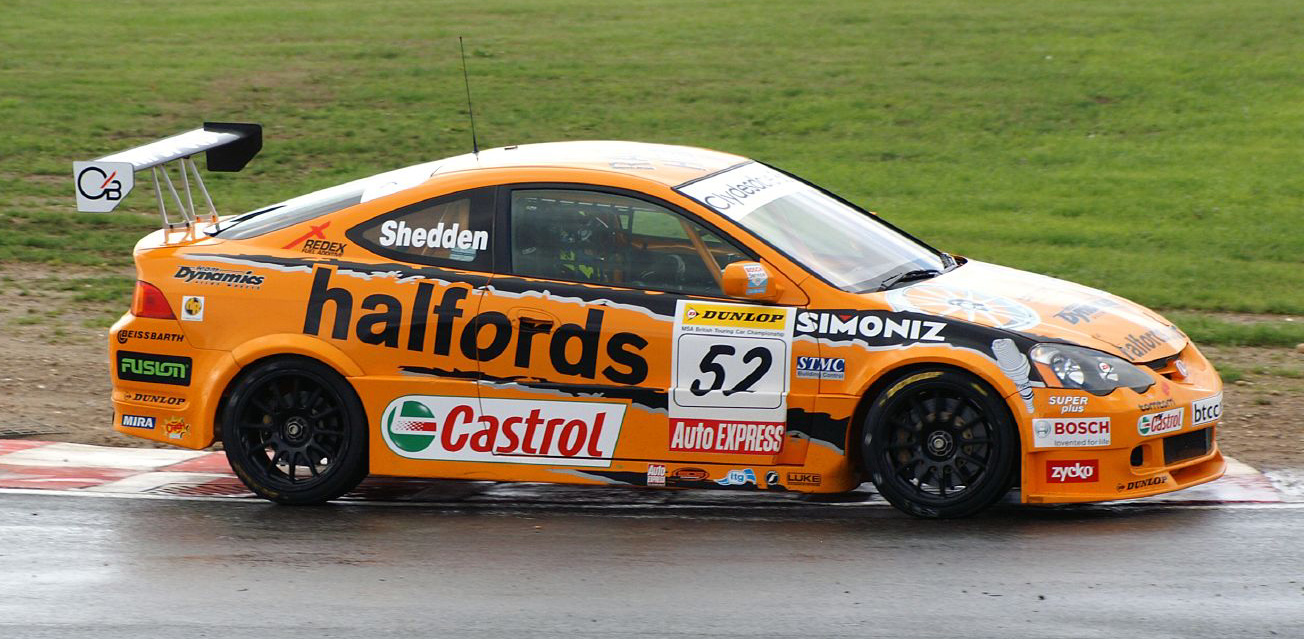
Team Dynamics' Honda Integra Type R

In 2005, Team Dynamics converted a pair of Honda Integra Type R's, imported from Japan, into BTC Touring racers to create the BTC-T Honda Integra Type R. The car was a big success as Matt Neal won the drivers' championship in 2005 and 2006, Team Dynamics won the teams' championship in the same years and it won 27 races. It was the first time in the modern era that a privateer driver won the overall championship.

Dynamics switched to the Civic in 2007. It couldn't challenge for the title, until 2010, when Team Dynamics became the works Honda team. Honda won the manufacturers' and teams' championships in 2010 and Matt Neal finished second in the drivers' standings. In 2011, Honda again won both the manufacturers' and teams' titles, but in the drivers championship, Matt Neal won ahead of his teammate Gordon Shedden in second, both driving for the Honda team. Honda again won the three titles in 2012 and 2013, Gordon Shedden the drivers' champion in 2012 and Andrew Jordan in 2013, though Jordan was driving for the independent Pirtek Racing team using the Civic.

Honda switched to the tourer version of the Civic in 2014, but they managed only third place in the teams' championship. For 2015 they changed the tourer to the Civic Type R, winning the manufacturers' championship and Shedden the drivers' championship in it. Shedden won the drivers' championship again in 2016.

After finishing third in the manufacturers' championship in 2017, Honda introduced the FK8 Civic Type R for 2018. It finished second in the manufacturers' and teams' standings that year. With Dan Cammish and Matt Neal driving, the FK8 Civic Type R won the teams' championship in 2019.

=== TCR ===
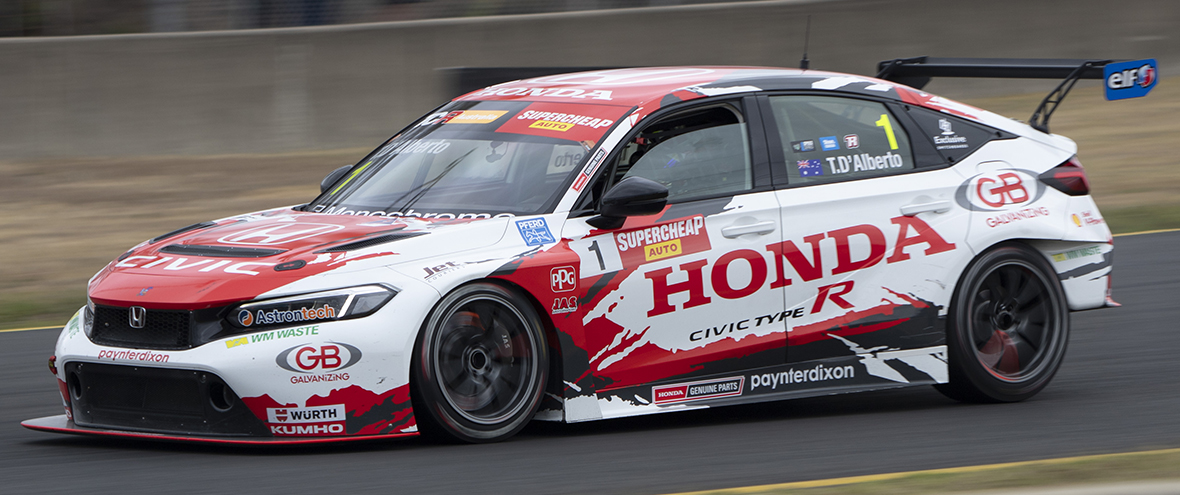
The Honda Civic Type R TCR won the global TCR Model of the Year title in 2019, 2020 and 2024.

Honda partner JAS Motorsport has built three variants of the Honda Civic for the customer-based TCR category: the FK2, FK7 and FL5, which were introduced in 2015, 2018 and 2023, respectively. These models have been used by customers to win over 600 races and 125 championships, helping the car to clinch the global TCR Model of the Year title in 2019, 2020 and 2024. This tally includes championship wins in the Asian, Australian, Benelux, Brazilian, British, Danish, European, German, International, Italian, Japanese, Middle Eastern, South American and Spanish TCR series, as well as in North America's SCCA World Challenge, Japan's Super Taikyu and the European Touring Car Cup. Other notable results include wins in the Nürburgring 24 Hours, the Fuji 24 Hours, the Macau Guia Race and the touring car gold medal at the FIA Motorsport Games.

=== TC2000 ===
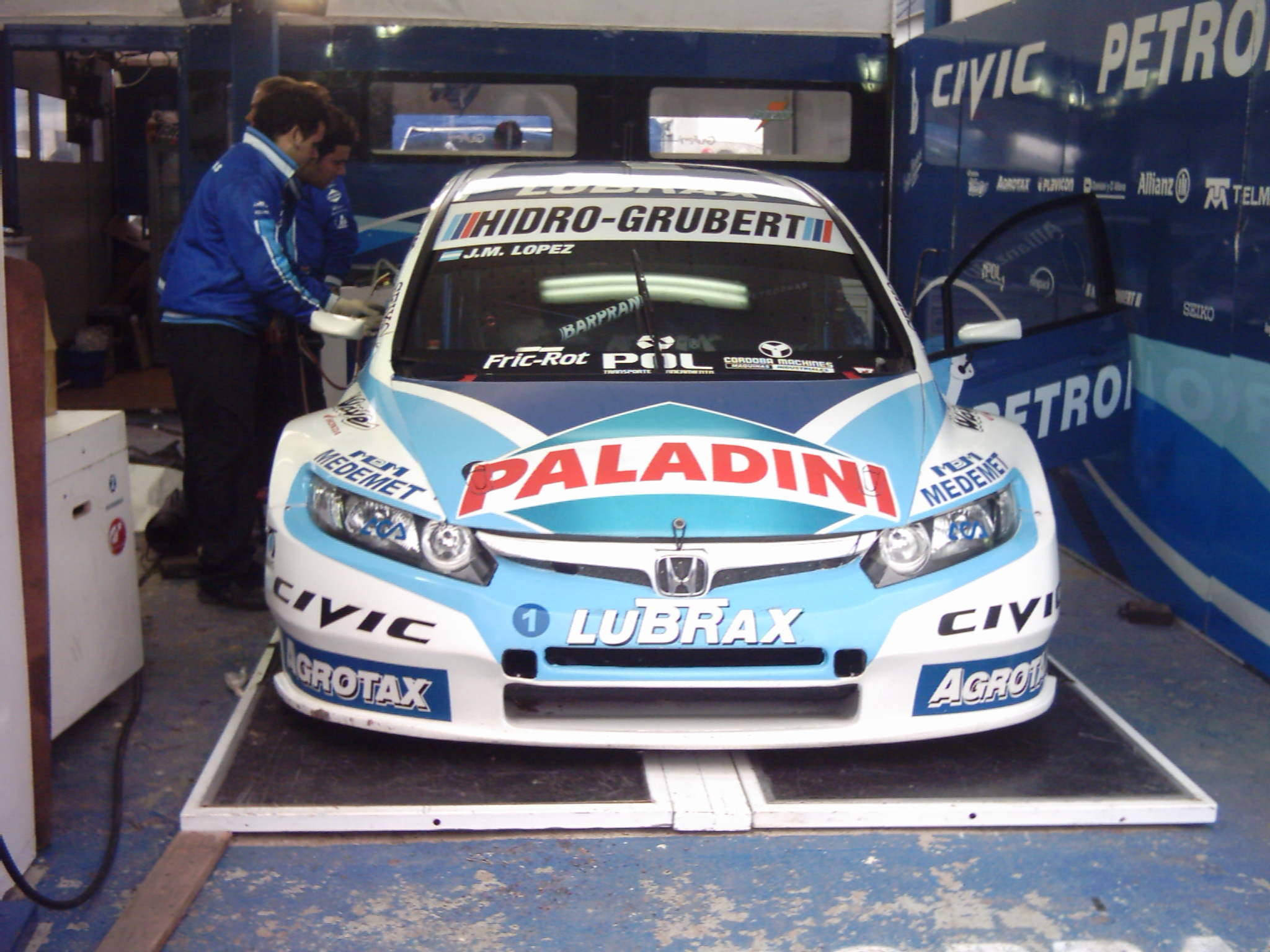
Honda New Civic TC2000

Honda entered the Argentine TC2000 championship in 1997. Honda Argentina supported the Pro Racing team, which used sixth generation Honda Civic cars. In 1998 and 1999, respectively, Omar Martínez and Juan Manuel Silva won the drivers' championship with Honda.

In 2003, Brazilian oil company Petrobras joined the team (now managed by RAM Racing Factory) as the main sponsor. In 2004, Honda introduced the new seventh generation Civics.

In 2008, José María López made his first full season in TC2000 with Honda Petrobras and won the championship. In 2009, a change in the engine regulations caused Honda to officially withdraw from the series, but the team continued to participate as Equipo Petrobras. López won the title again that year.

Honda returned to officially support the Sportteam, when the championship was transformed into the Súper TC2000. It remained until 2013, without achieving outstanding results. Honda returned again in 2019, with the new tenth generation Civics. The next year, Swiss oil company Puma Energy entered as the main sponsor.

=== Other series ===
Honda has been competing in many other touring car series. Some championships that Honda have won include the Japanese Touring Car Championship in 1996 and 1997, the European Touring Car Cup in 2009, 2010, 2011 and 2016, the SCCA World Challenge TC class in 1999, 2000, 2002, 2005, 2006, 2008, 2009, 2011, 2012, 2013 and 2014, the Argentine Turismo Nacional in 2001, 2002, 2004, 2006, 2010, 2018, 2019 and 2020 and the TCR International Series teams' championship in 2017.

== Sportscar racing ==
=== Super GT ===
Honda's first involvement in Super GT (known as the All Japan Grand Touring Car Championship, or JGTC for short, between 1993 and 2004) came in 1996, when Team Kunimitsu entered an NSX GT2 in the GT500 category.

Honda introduced a new NSX for 1997 that was built specifically to the GT500 regulations. Also, a new team Mugen × Dome Project joined alongside Team Kunimitsu in running the NSX's. By the end of the season Honda had taken two podiums – both by Team Kunimitsu – and two pole positions – one by each team.

In 1998, the Mugen × Dome Project expanded to running two cars and Nakajima Racing joined Honda. The Honda was the fastest car during that season; taking pole position and fastest lap in every race. Honda won the last four races of the season, but inconsistency by the teams and reliability issues meant that they lost the title to the more consistent Nismo team. 1999 started with back-to-back wins for Honda that extended their record of consecutive victories to six – a record that still hasn't been beaten to date.

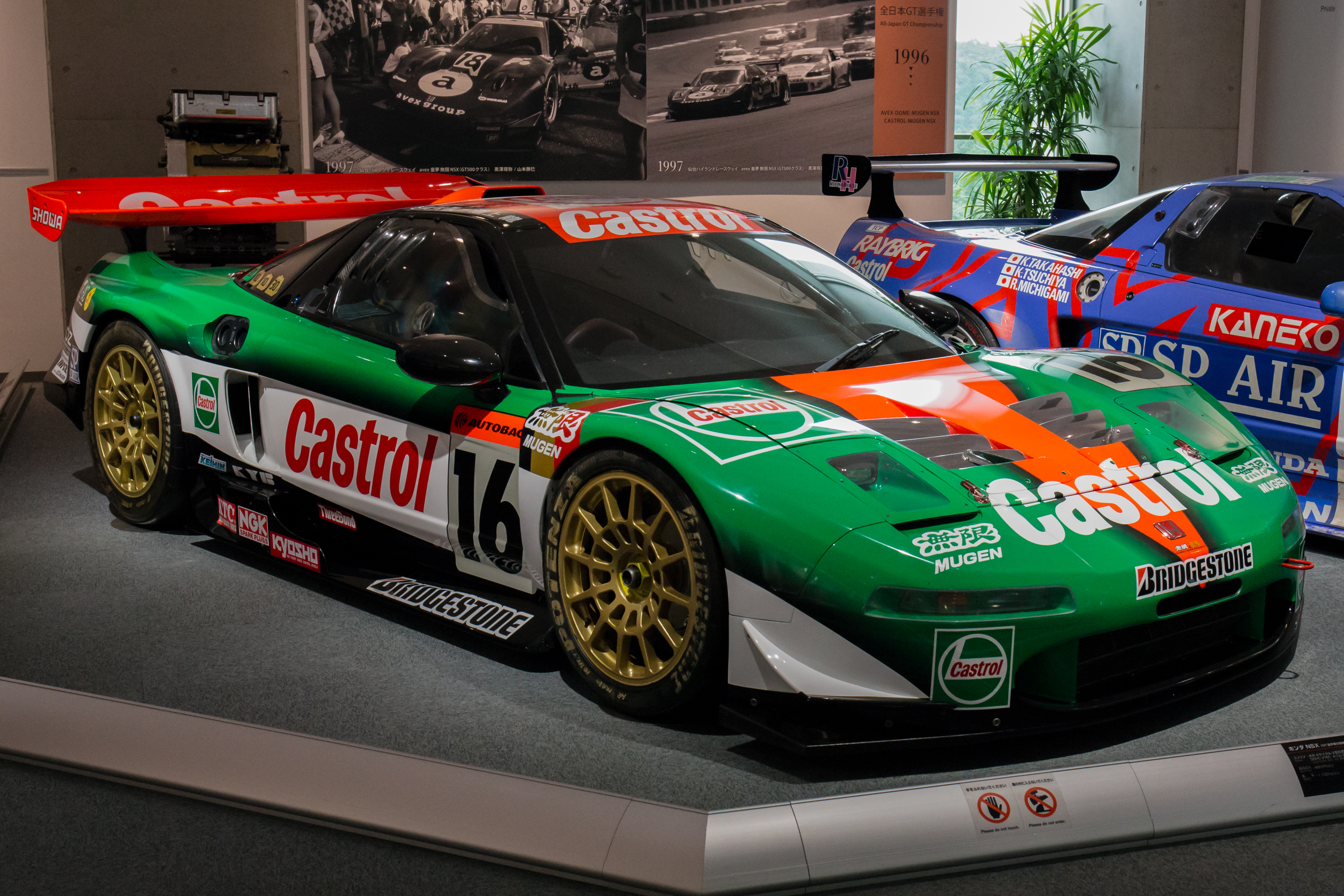
The Castrol Mugen NSX from 2000

Honda finally won the title in 2000 when the Castrol Mugen NSX of Ryo Michigami consistently took podiums and strong points finishes through the season. A win and other strong finishes by the Takata Dome part of the team meant that Mugen × Dome Project won the teams' title. Also, Autobacs Racing Team Aguri (ARTA) joined Honda this year and took their first win with them at Fuji.

Honda came close to winning the title in 2001, when ARTA and Mugen were only two points away from winning. 2002 was very close in the drivers' championship again, as Nakajima Racing lost it by only one point. However, Mugen × Dome Project took advantage of the points system used in the teams' championship to win it by 21 points.

Honda were not so competitive in 2003, and in 2004 they introduced a turbocharged 3.0L V6 engine. It being their first turbocharged engine in the series meant that its development was slow and they took only one win in the season.

In 2005, Honda returned to the naturally aspirated 3.0L V6, and they became competitive again. ARTA finished the season second in the rankings. Honda was in the championship fight again in 2006; Team Kunimitsu coming second and Dome third.

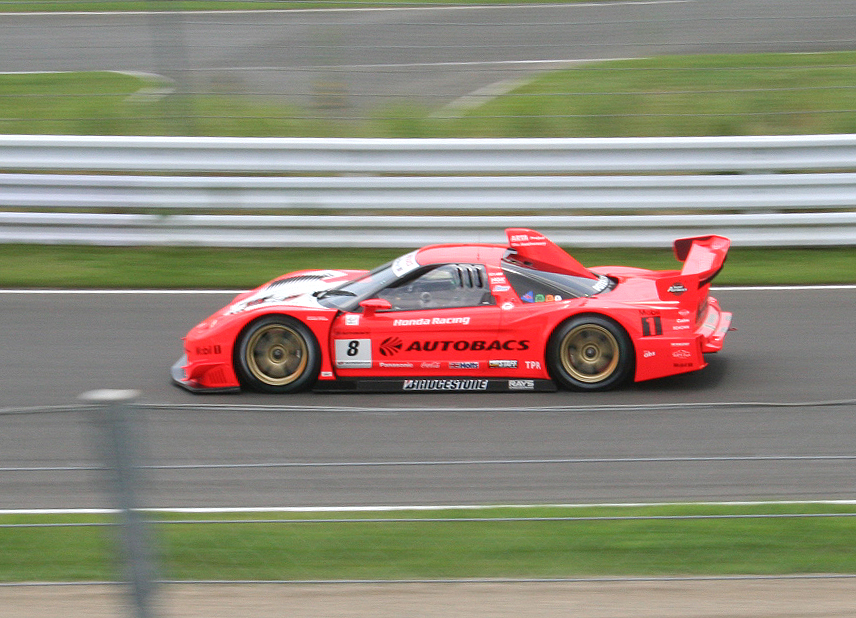
ARTA dominated the 2007 season with the NSX.

Honda dominated the 2007 season as their teams' took the top four spots in the championship. The winning team that season, ARTA, driven by Ralph Firman and Daisuke Ito, had a 31-point advantage over the Nismo 350Z in fifth and became the first ever team in the series' history to win the title before the final race was run.

Due to the domination of 2007, the NSX was given more weight handicaps for 2008. As a result, they were not as competitive, taking only one win and a best position of sixth in the championship by Dome. The weight handicap was lowered for 2009, and Honda came back in the championship fight. ARTA finished runner-up and won at Fuji and at the final race of the season in Motegi that would become the first-gen NSX's final race.

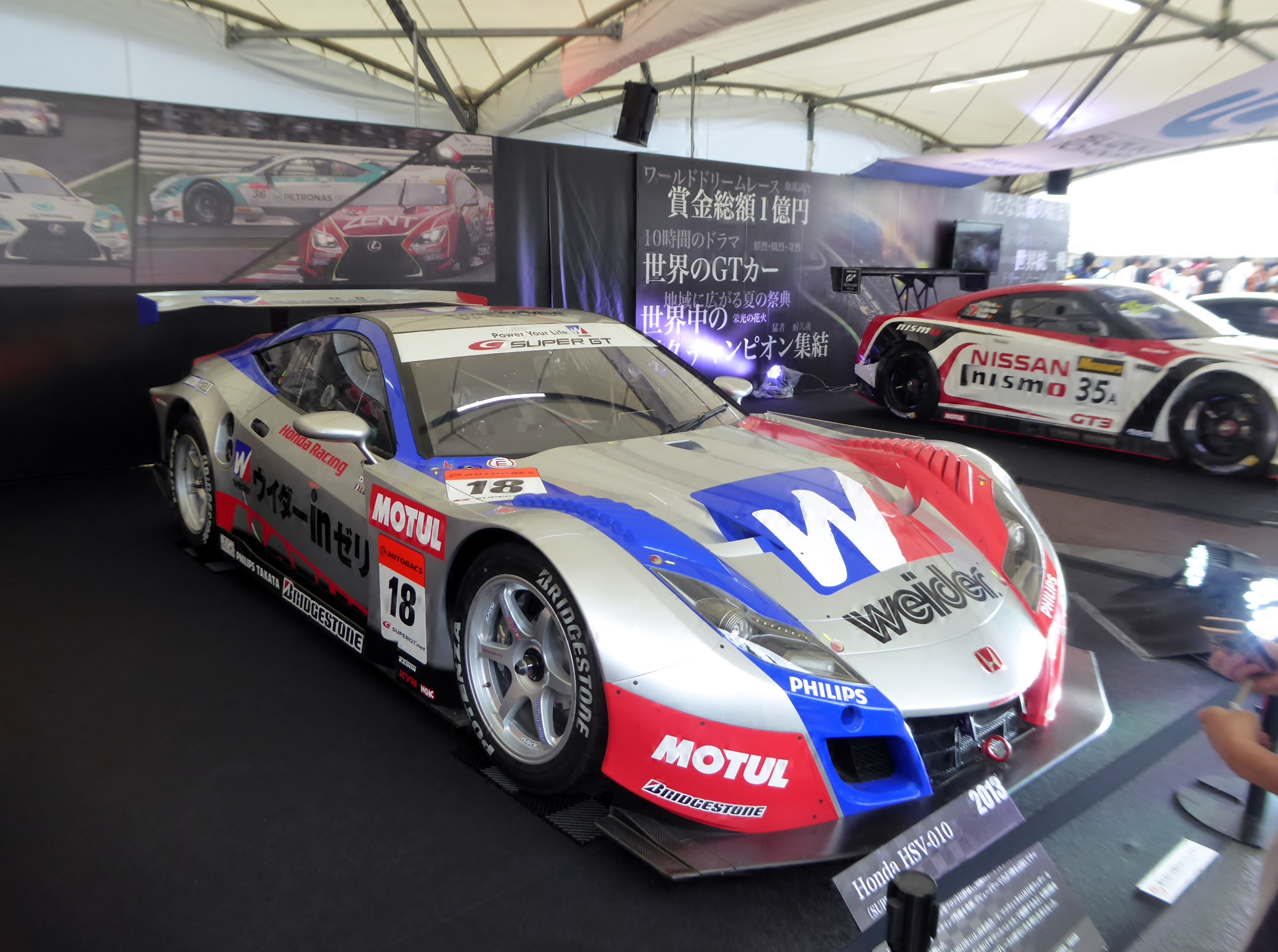
2010 HSV-010 GT of Dome

New rules for 2010 requiring all GT500 cars to have a front-engine, rear-wheel drive layout meant that the mid-engined NSX could not be used anymore. Honda replaced it with the HSV-010 GT, a unique car that didn't have a production car equivalent. The car was competitive from the start and took pole position in its first race. ARTA won the 1000km Suzuka race in August, and Dome and their drivers, Loïc Duval and Takashi Kogure, were crowned champions in the car's first season.

The car continued to be used for the next three seasons, winning the 1000 km Suzuka race in 2011 and 2013, and finishing third and second in the championship in the same years respectively.

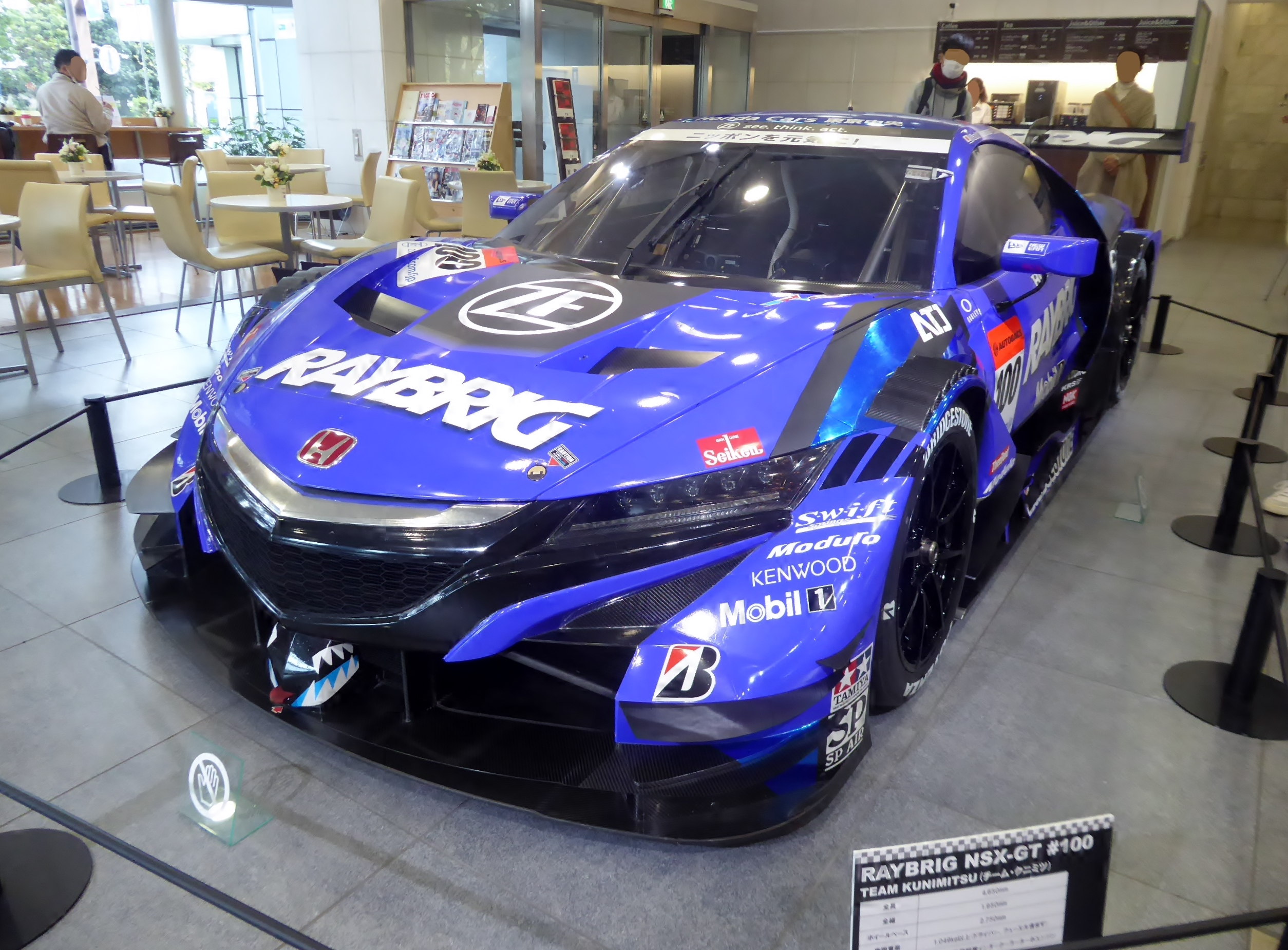
The championship-winning Raybrig NSX-GT from 2018

New regulations for 2014 allowed mid-engined cars again and required all cars to use 2.0L turbocharged inline-four engines. Honda introduced the NSX Concept-GT that had a hybrid system, unlike its competitors. It was based on the concept version of the second-gen NSX. The car got its first win at Fuji in 2014 and finished third in the standings in 2015. The hybrid system was removed for 2016 and the car became uncompetitive, not winning a race at all, and only achieving three podiums and one pole position during the 2016 season.

For 2017, Honda introduced a new NSX based on the production version, but it didn't have a hybrid system. Nakajima Racing won the final 1000 km Suzuka with it in 2017. The car became really competitive in 2018, taking pole position at every race, except the Fuji rounds, and winning the title by Team Kunimitsu and their drivers, Naoki Yamamoto and former F1-champion Jenson Button.

=== 24 Hours of Le Mans ===
Honda first entered the 24 Hours of Le Mans in 1994 with three NSX GT2 models. All cars finished the race, with the best placed of them finishing sixth in its class, 14th overall.

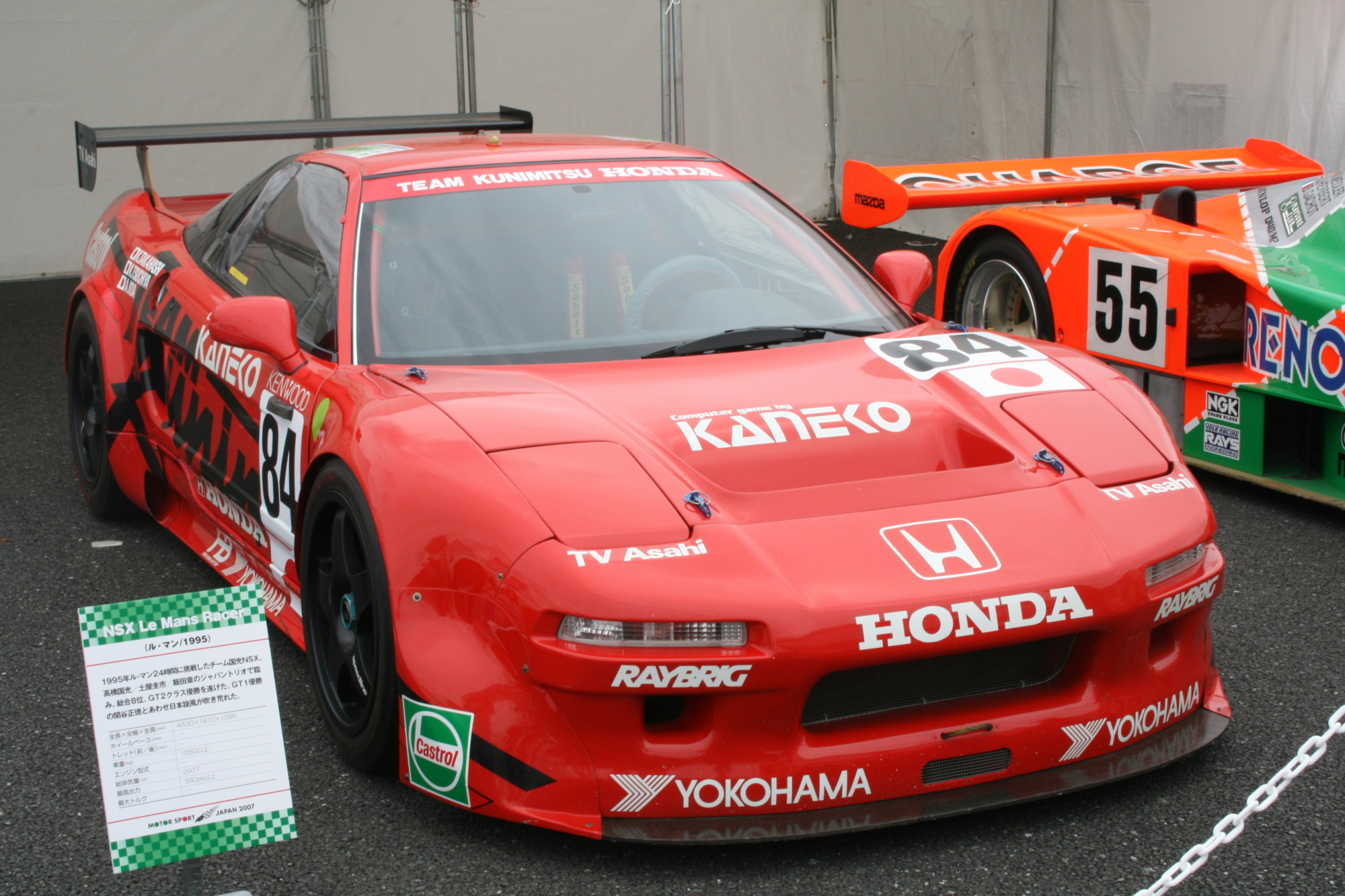
The 1995 class-winning NSX GT2

Honda returned for 1995, this time with two turbocharged NSX GT1's numbered 46 and 47, and an NSX GT2 numbered 84. Car 47 retired with a clutch and gearbox failure, while the 46 car finished, but was not classified due to not completing 70% of the race distance. Car 84, driven by Keiichi Tsuchiya, Kunimitsu Takahashi and Akira Iida won the GT2 class and finished eighth overall, ahead of several GT1 cars.

Only one NSX returned for 1996, with the same class-winning drivers from 1995. It finished on the podium in the GT2 class and 16th overall.

After a fourteen-year absence, Honda returned to Le Mans in 2010 with two ARX-01C prototypes entered in the LMP2 class, run by Strakka Racing and Highcroft Racing. The Strakka Racing car had no issues in the race and won the LMP2 class and finished fifth overall, on Honda's LMP2 debut. It was the best ever result for an LMP2 car at the time.

Two ARX-01d cars returned for 2011 run by RML and last years winners Strakka Racing. The RML car finished fourth in its class and the Strakka car retired. In the following year, Starworks Motorsport won the LMP2 class with the ARX-03b, while JRM switched to running the ARX-03a in the LMP1 class, finishing as the second highest LMP1 privateer team. Strakka Racing returned in 2013 with the ARX-03c and finished as the highest placed LMP1 privateer team in sixth overall.

=== ALMS and IMSA ===
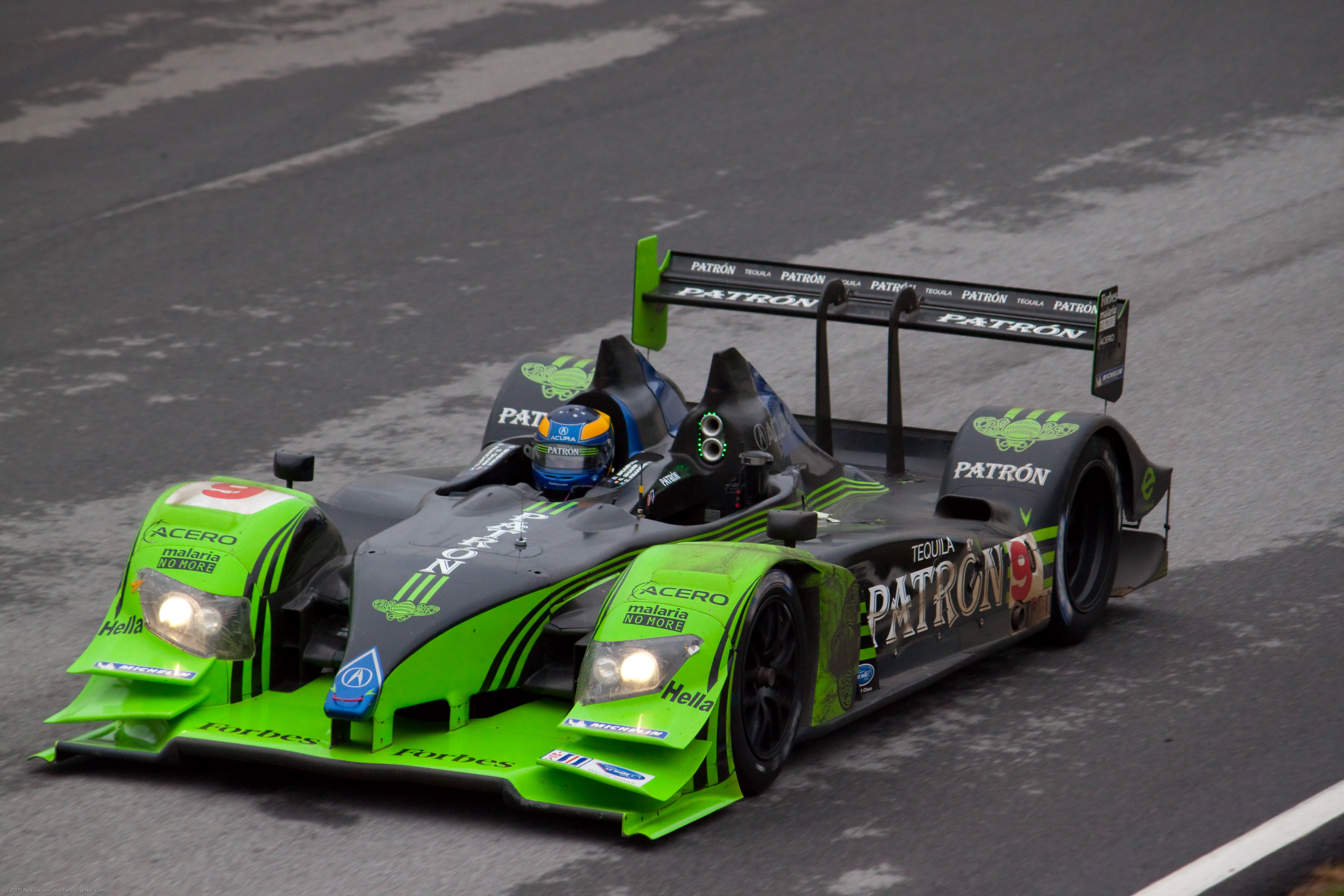
Acura ARX-02a of Highcroft Racing

Honda entered the American Le Mans Series in 2007 under the Acura name in the LMP2 class. They won their first race in the series, the 12 Hours of Sebring, but Porsche dominated the rest of the season. In 2008, the Acura's won six of the seven races and were much closer in the championship fight, the best placed team finishing second.

In 2009, they joined the LMP1 class alongside LMP2. Acura ended up as champions in both classes as the Highcroft Racing team won the LMP1 title with the Acura ARX-02a, while Fernández Racing won in LMP2 with the Acura ARX-01B.

The Acura name was changed to Honda Performance Development (HPD) for 2010. Honda became champions in the LMP class again as Highcroft Racing's HPD ARX-01C beat the Porsche RS Spyder Evo of Team Cytosport. Further championships followed in 2012 and 2013 with the HPD ARX-03a of Pickett Racing.

In 2014, ALMS merged with RSCS and became the IMSA SportsCar Championship, organized by the International Motor Sports Association (IMSA). Honda finished third in the manufacturers' championship in the first two years of the championship in 2014 and 2015. In 2016, Honda won the 24 Hours of Daytona, 12 Hours of Sebring and the Petit Le Mans by the ESM and MSR teams using the Honda HR35TT in a Ligier JS P2 chassis, which gave Honda the Manufacturers' Endurance Cup title.

Honda didn't compete in the Prototype class in 2017, instead competing in the GTD class with the Acura NSX GT3. The car won two races and finished fourth in the manufacturers' championship. In the following season in 2018, Acura finished second in the manufacturers' championship in the GTD class.

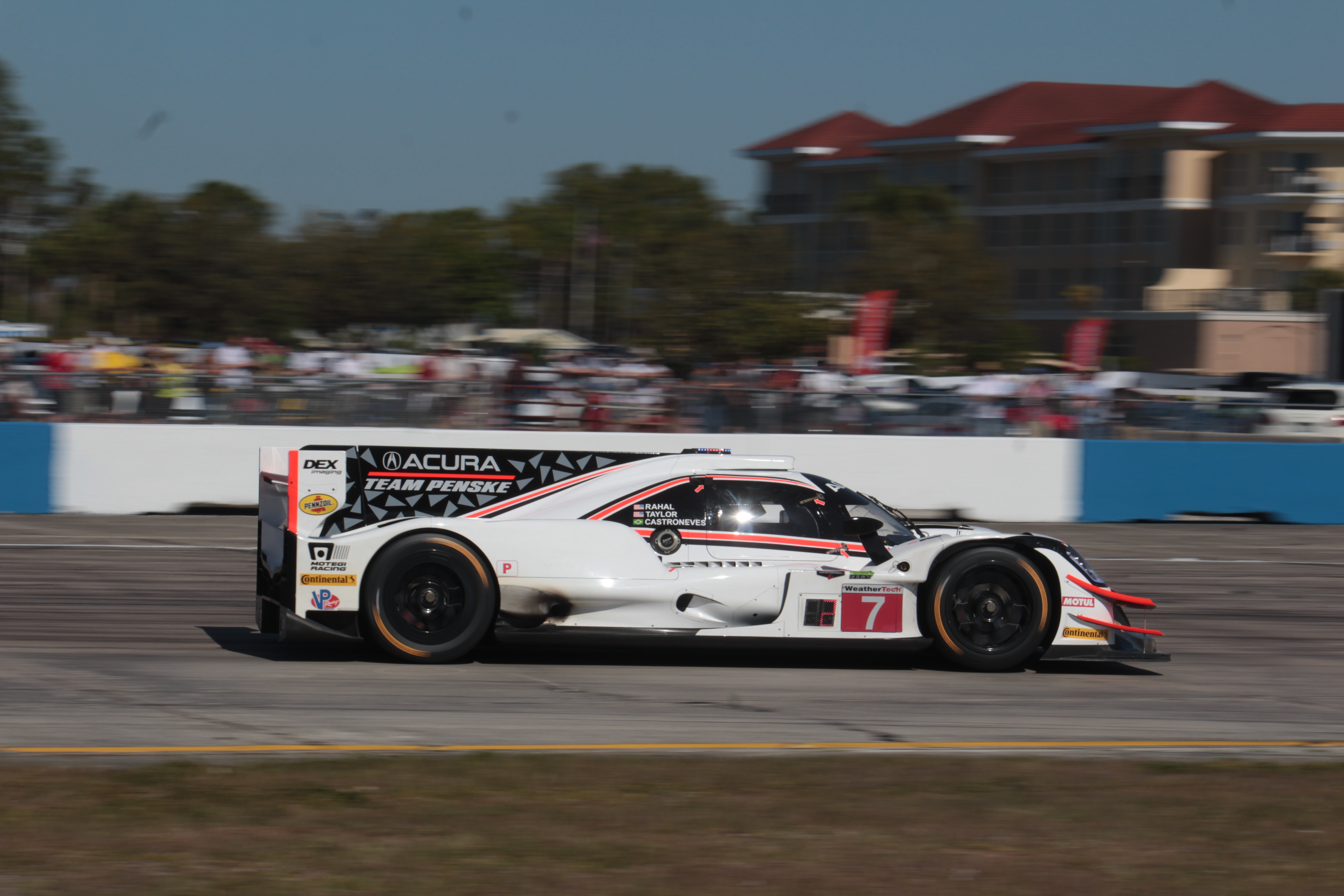
The ARX-05 at the 2018 12 Hours of Sebring

Honda returned to the Prototype class in 2018 with the Acura ARX-05. The car scored its first win at Mid-Ohio that year, finishing second in the manufacturers' championship. 2019 was a successful year for Acura, as they won the drivers', teams' and manufacturers' championships in the Prototype class, with Dane Cameron and Juan Pablo Montoya driving the drivers' championship-winning car. The NSX GT3 also won the drivers' and teams' championships in the GTD class.

=== World Endurance Championship ===
Honda's HPD prototypes were entered to the first season of the FIA World Endurance Championship (WEC) in 2012, by Strakka Racing and JRM in the LMP1 class and Starworks Motorsport in LMP2. Strakka Racing and JRM finished second and third in the privateers LMP1 Teams' Trophy, while Starworks Motorsport won the LMP2 Trophy title, including a class-win at the 24 Hours of Le Mans, with the HPD ARX-03b. For the following year in 2013, Strakka Racing entered a HPD ARX-03c into the LMP1 class. They won against other privateer teams at the 24 Hours of Le Mans, but did not compete after that race.

== IndyCar ==
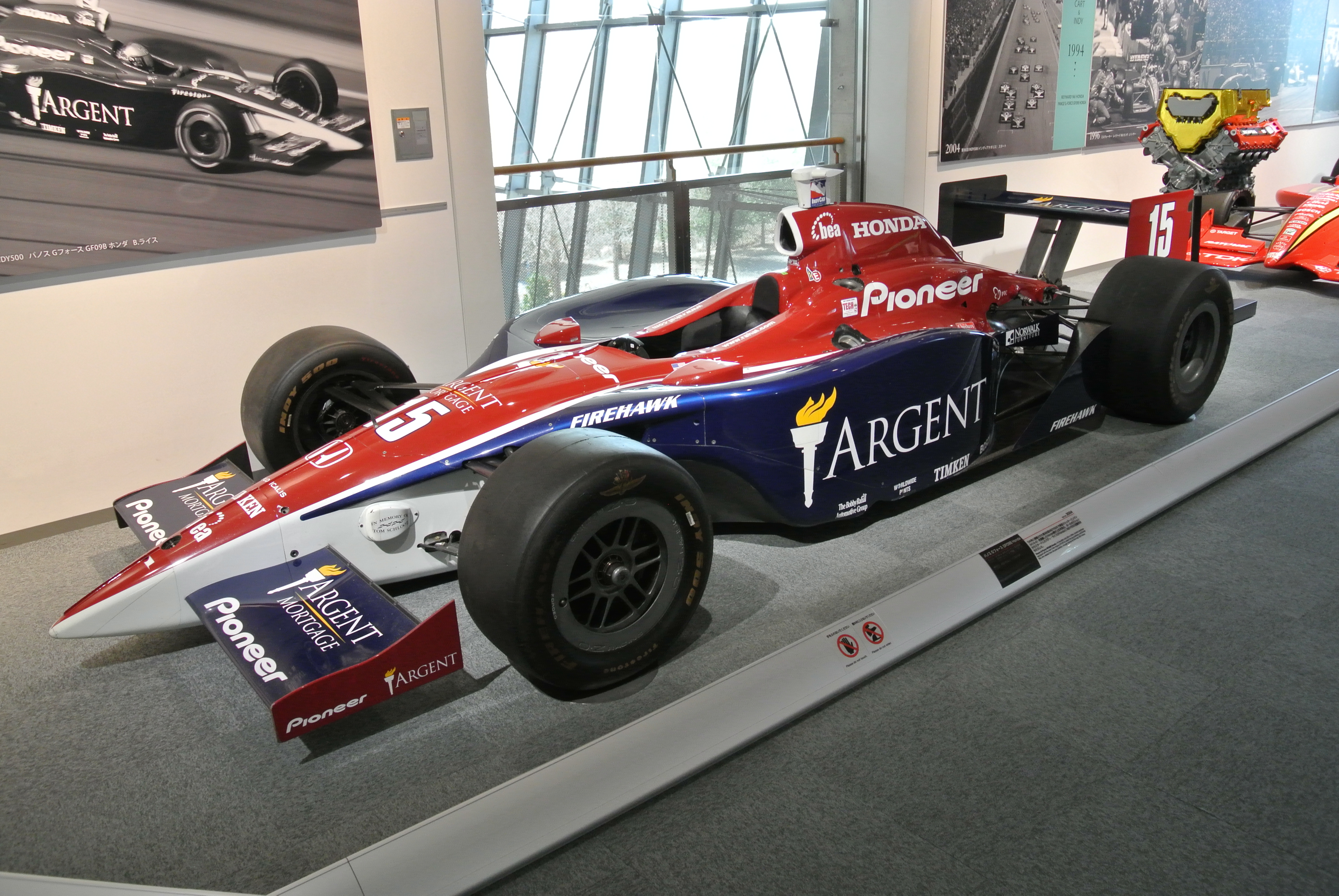
The 2004 Indianapolis 500 winner

Honda started competing in IndyCar, sanctioned by CART, in 1994, winning their first race in 1995. Their first manufacturers' and drivers' championships came in 1996. Three more manufacturers' titles came in 1998, 1999 and 2001, and five more drivers' titles in 1997, 1998, 1999, 2000 and 2001. Honda left the CART sanctioned series after 2002.

Honda joined the IndyCar Series in 2003, competing against Chevrolet and Toyota. Honda won the manufacturers' championship in 2004 and 2005, and the drivers' championship was won by Honda-powered drivers in 2004 and 2005. Honda also won the Indianapolis 500 in 2004 and 2005. Between 2003 and 2005, Honda scored 28 wins from 49 races.

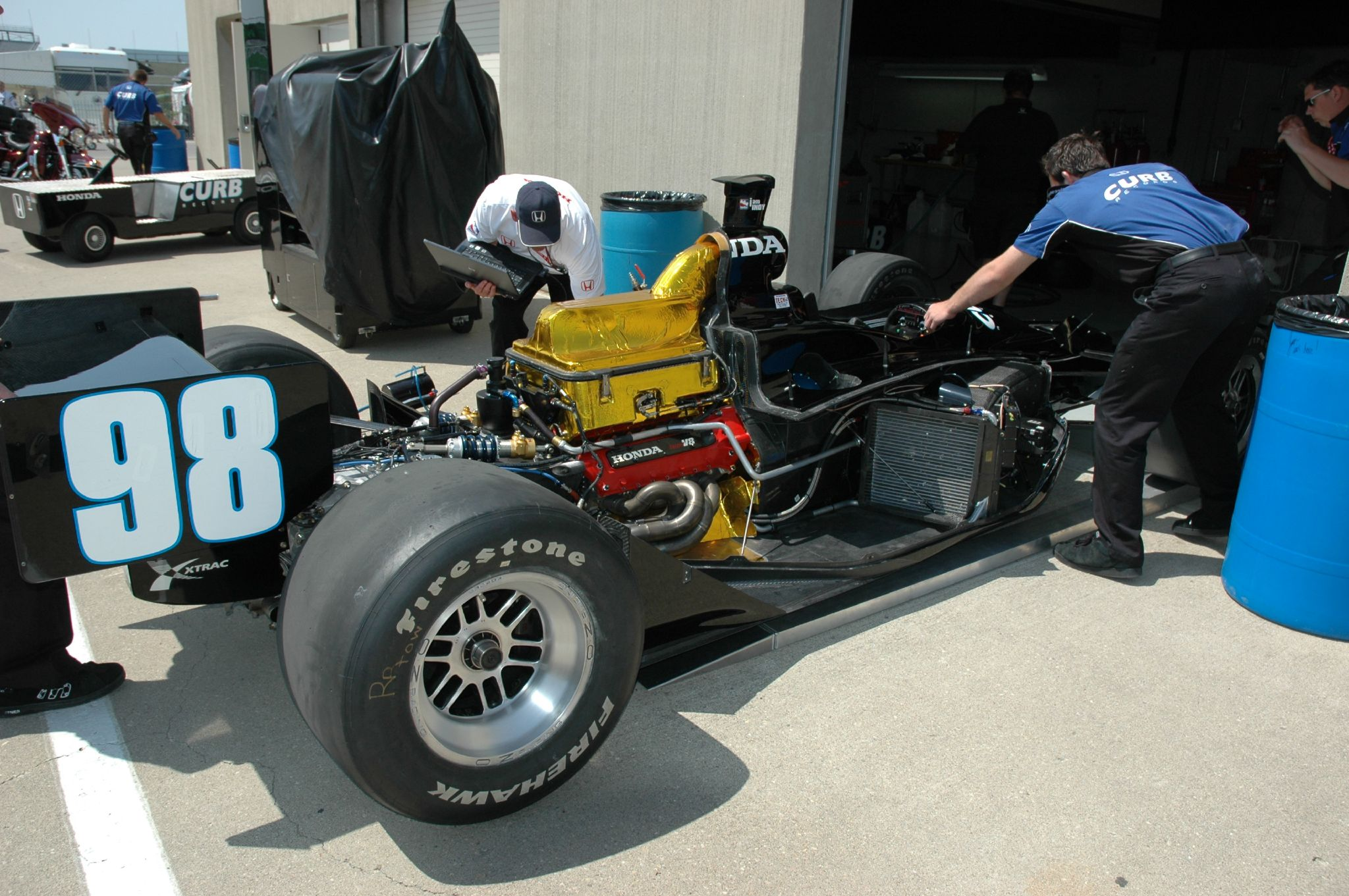
Honda's Indy V8 from 2007

As Toyota and Chevrolet left the series after 2005, Honda became the only engine manufacturer of the series in 2006, a role which lasted through 2011. During the Indy 500s between 2006 and 2011, there were no engine related retirements for six years in a row, also the first six times in the history of the race that that had happened. In the six seasons as the only manufacturer, the engines completed 1,188,376 miles of practice, qualifying and racing, and had just six race-day engine failures and no such failures in the entire 2008, 2010 and 2011 seasons.

Other manufacturers returned in 2012 as Chevrolet and Lotus joined the series. Since then, Honda-powered drivers Dario Franchitti, Ryan Hunter-Reay, Alexander Rossi and Takuma Sato have won the Indianapolis 500 respectively in 2012, 2014, 2016, 2017 and 2020. Honda-powered Scott Dixon won the drivers' title in 2008, 2013, 2018, and 2020 while Honda won the manufacturers' title in 2018, 2019, 2020, 2021, and 2025.

Honda is the sponsor of the Honda Indy in Toronto, Canada which is held every year in July.

== Other series ==
=== Super Formula ===
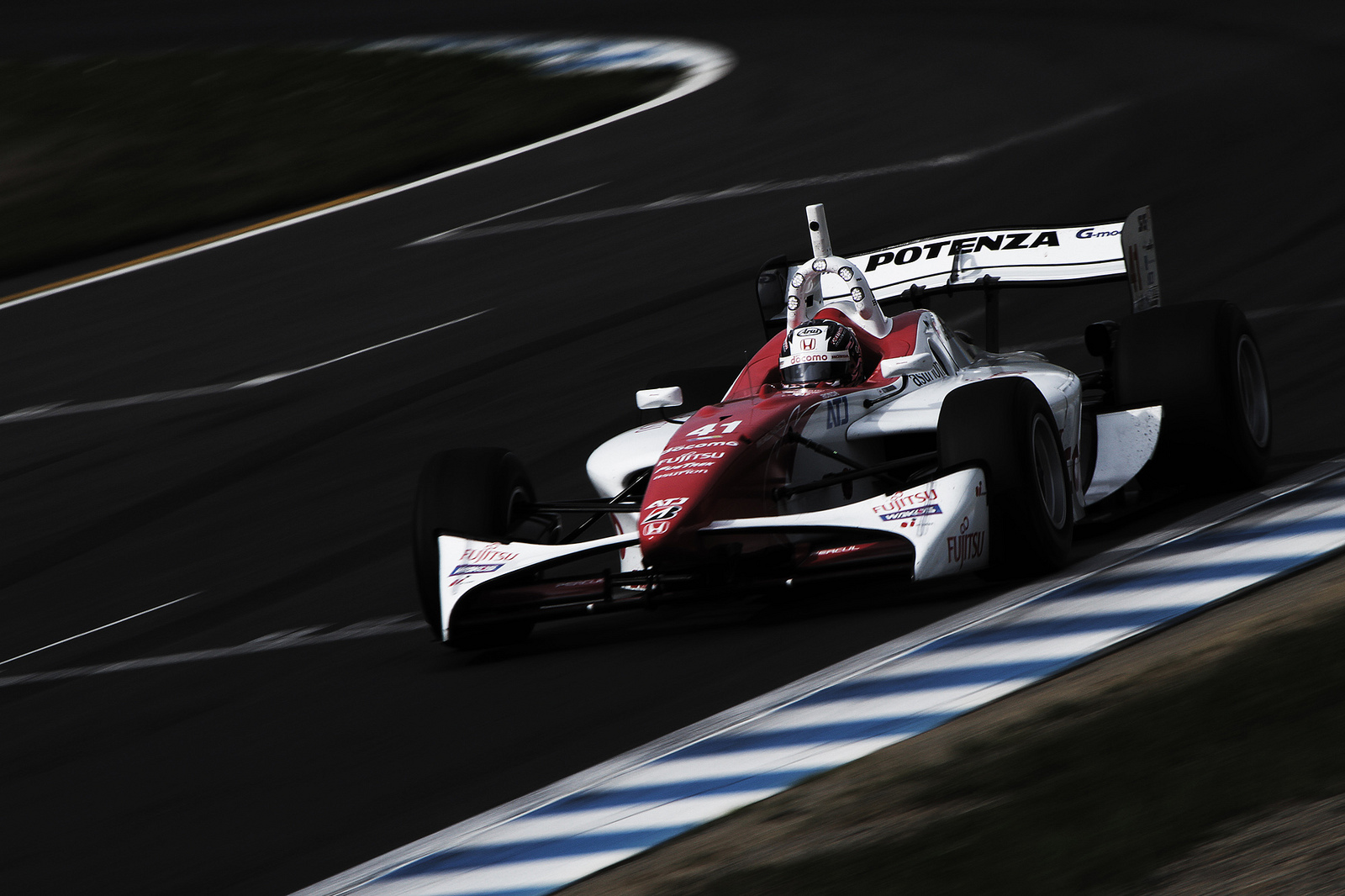
Koudai Tsukakoshi in 2012

Honda has been competing in Super Formula since 1981, and won the championship in their first year as Satoru Nakajima became champion in 1981. Honda's engines continued to win the championship for the next six years until 1988, when the closely related Mugen company replaced Honda. The Mugen engines won seven championships between 1988 and 1997, until they became the only engine manufacturer of the series in 1998, a role which lasted until 2005. Honda replaced Mugen in 2006, while Toyota also joined the series in the same season. Since then, Honda engines have won championships in 2009, 2012, 2013, 2018, 2019, 2020, 2021 and 2022.

=== Formula Two ===
After a shaky start in 1965, Honda dominated Formula Two racing in 1966 with the Honda RA300E/RA302E engine, the Brabham-Hondas winning all but one of the races in which they participated. Jack Brabham won the Trophées de France championship ahead of teammate Denny Hulme.

Honda returned to Formula Two in 1981, supplying the Ralt team. Ralt-Honda won the championship in their first season together in 1981 and further championships followed in 1983 and 1984.

Formula 3000 replaced Formula Two in 1985. Mugen engines won the championship in 1989, 1990 and 1991.

=== Rallying, rallycross and off-road ===
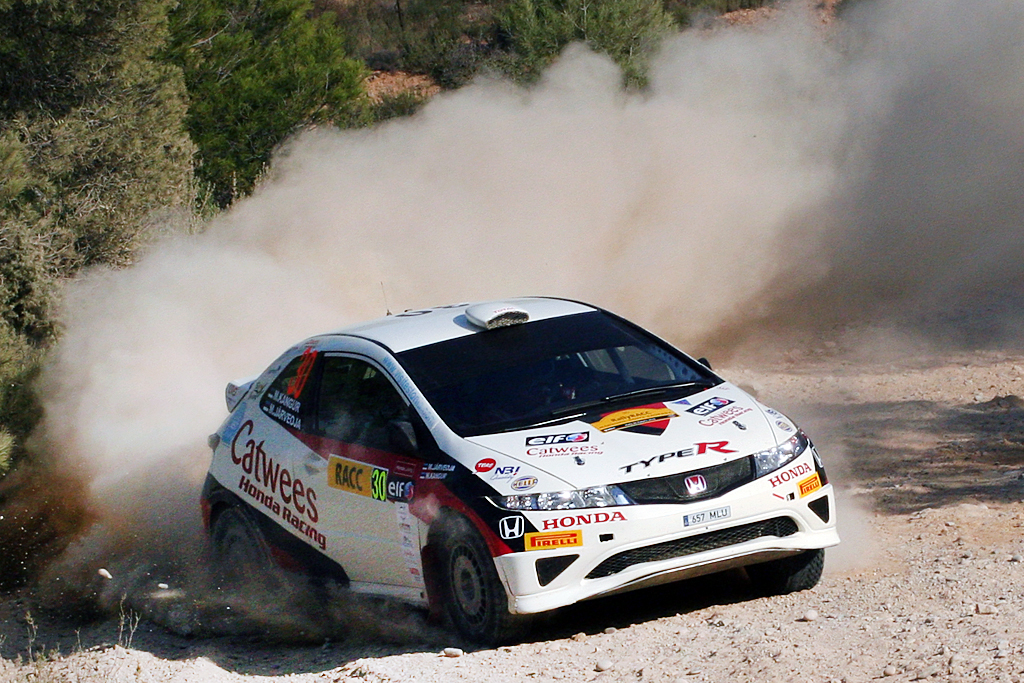
Martin Kangur rallying a Civic Type R R3 in 2010

Honda won the 2WD manufacturers' championship of the Intercontinental Rally Challenge/European Rally Championship in 2011, 2013 and 2014 with the Civic Type R R3. Honda also won the Australian Rally Championship in 2012 and 2013 with the Jazz. Honda's Integra and mostly Civic models have dominated the up to 2000cc Group N and later the 2WD classes of the Finnish Rally Championship, winning the title every year between 2000 and 2018, except in 2001, 2010 and 2011.

The division 2 class of the FIA European Rallycross Championship was won with the Honda Civic Type R in 2007 and 2008, and also finished runner-up in 2000 and 2005, though in 2000 with the Integra Type R. Honda entered the Global RallyCross Championship in 2016 and 2017 with the Civic Coupe. They took 10 podiums and a victory and finished third in the manufacturers' championship in both seasons before the series discontinued in 2018.

The Honda Ridgeline won the Stock Mini class of the Baja 1000 in 2008 and 2010, and Class 2 in 2015. It also won Class 7 of the Baja 500 in 2016, 2018 and 2019.

== Motorcycling ==
=== Superbike World Championship ===
Team HRC is the official Japanese factory team of Honda in WSBK.

== See also ==
- Honda in Formula One
- Honda Racing Corporation USA
- Honda Racing Corporation
- Acura in racing
- Mugen Motorsports
- JAS Motorsport
- Team Dynamics
