= Paula Brown =

Paula Brown may refer to:

- Paula Brown (biochemist)
- Paula Brown (politician)
- Paula Jean Brown, bass player with Giant Sand

== See also ==
- Paul Brown (disambiguation)
