= 2011 Pirelli World Challenge =

Seasons
- ← 2010 2012 →

The 2011 Pirelli World Challenge season was the 22nd season of the Sports Car Club of America's World Challenge series. It was the first season under the Pirelli sponsorship. Championships were awarded in three classes: GT, GTS, and Touring. The season began at St. Petersburg, Florida, on March 26 ended after 12 rounds at Road Atlanta on September 30. All rounds were covered on television by Versus.

== Schedule ==
Part of the schedule was released December 1, 2010. The final two rounds were announced February 2, 2011. Watkins Glen, Exhibition Place, and Virginia International Raceway were not retained. Infineon Raceway returned to the schedule after a five-year absence. Laguna Seca and Road Atlanta returned after a one-year absence.

Round	Date	Circuit	Location	Supporting
1	March 26	Streets of St. Petersburg	St. Petersburg, Florida	IndyCar Series
2	March 27	Streets of St. Petersburg	St. Petersburg, Florida	IndyCar Series
3	April 18	Streets of Long Beach	Long Beach, California	IndyCar Series / American Le Mans Series
4	April 30	Miller Motorsports Park	Tooele, Utah	Stand-alone event with NASCAR West Series
5	May 21	Mosport International Raceway	Bowmanville, Ontario	Stand-alone event
6	May 22	Mosport International Raceway	Bowmanville, Ontario	Stand-alone event
7	August 6	Mid-Ohio Sports Car Course	Lexington, Ohio	IndyCar Series / American Le Mans Series
8	August 7	Mid-Ohio Sports Car Course	Lexington, Ohio	IndyCar Series / American Le Mans Series
9	August 27	Infineon Raceway (Indy course)	Sonoma, California	IndyCar Series
10	August 28	Infineon Raceway (Indy course)	Sonoma, California	IndyCar Series
11	September 18	Mazda Raceway Laguna Seca	Monterey, California	American Le Mans Series
12	September 30	Road Atlanta	Braselton, Georgia	American Le Mans Series

== News ==
On January 3, 2011, Cadillac announced their return to the series after a four-year absence.

Pirelli became the sole tire supplier for the 2011 season. The series used slick racing tires, rather than the street-legal treaded tires used in previous seasons.

Brimtek Motorsports announced that they would be fielding a Volkswagen GTI in the touring car class for 2011.

It was announced that Mike Skeen would be driving a Chevrolet Corvette for CRP Motorsports in the GT class.

== Results ==
Rnd	Circuit	GT Winning Car	GTS Winning Car	TC Winning Car
Rnd	Circuit	GT Winning Driver	GTS Winning Driver	TC Winning Driver
1	St. Petersburg	#45 TruSpeed Porsche 911 GT3	#19 Steeda Ford Mustang Boss 302S	#71 Compass360 Racing Honda Civic Si
1	St. Petersburg	(United States) Patrick Long	(United States) Jason von Kluge	(United States) Lawson Aschenbach
2	St. Petersburg	#45 TruSpeed Porsche 911 GT3	#73 Traxxas Ford Mustang FR500S	#33 Brimtek Motorsports Volkswagen GTI
2	St. Petersburg	(United States) Patrick Long	(United States) Eric Foss	(United States) Tristan Herbert
3	Long Beach	#10 ACS Express Ford Mustang Cobra	#50 Tiger Racing Ford Mustang Boss 302S	#67 Shea Racing Honda Civic Si
3	Long Beach	(United States) Brandon Davis	(United States) Paul Brown	(United States) Shea Holbrook
4	Miller	#7 Daskalos Motorsports Dodge Viper	#05 Momentum Chevrolet Camaro	#88 K-Pax Racing Volvo C30
4	Miller	(United States) Jason Daskalos	(United States) Jordan Musser	(Canada) Aaron Povoledo
5	Mosport	#2 CRP Racing Chevrolet Corvette Z06	#25 Interbank FX/Racewithrp.com Ford Mustang FR500S	#71 Compass360 Racing Honda Civic Si
5	Mosport	(United States) Mike Skeen	(United States) Ben Crosland	(United States) Lawson Aschenbach
6	Mosport	#2 CRP Racing Chevrolet Corvette Z06	#50 Tiger Racing Ford Mustang Boss 302S	#71 Compass360 Racing Honda Civic Si
6	Mosport	(United States) Mike Skeen	(United States) Paul Brown	(United States) Lawson Aschenbach
7	Mid-Ohio	#9 K-Pax Racing Volvo S60	#50 Tiger Racing Ford Mustang Boss 302S	#66 K-Pax Racing Volvo C30
7	Mid-Ohio	(United States) Alex Figge	(United States) Paul Brown	(United States) Robb Holland
8	Mid-Ohio	#3 Cadillac Racing Cadillac CTS-V	#50 Tiger Racing Ford Mustang Boss 302S	#88 K-Pax Racing Volvo C30
8	Mid-Ohio	(United States) Johnny O'Connell	(United States) Paul Brown	(Canada) Aaron Povoledo
9	Infineon	#45 TruSpeed Porsche 911 GT3	#1 RealTime Racing Acura TSX	#71 Compass360 Racing Honda Civic Si
9	Infineon	(United States) Patrick Long	(United States) Peter Cunningham	(United States) Lawson Aschenbach
10	Infineon	#45 TruSpeed Porsche 911 GT3	#25 Interbank FX/Racewithrp.com Ford Mustang FR500S	#88 K-Pax Racing Volvo C30
10	Infineon	(United States) Patrick Long	(United States) Ben Crosland	(Canada) Aaron Povoledo
11	Laguna Seca	#2 CRP Racing Chevrolet Corvette Z06	#50 Tiger Racing Ford Mustang Boss 302S	#71 Compass360 Racing Honda Civic Si
11	Laguna Seca	(United States) Mike Skeen	(United States) Paul Brown	(United States) Lawson Aschenbach
12	Road Atlanta	#3 Cadillac Racing Cadillac CTS-V	#73 Traxxas Ford Mustang FR500S	#88 K-Pax Racing Volvo C30
12	Road Atlanta	(United States) Johnny O'Connell	(United States) Eric Foss	(Canada) Aaron Povoledo
