= Paul Brown (disambiguation) =

Paul Brown (1908–1991) was an American football coach and owner

Paul Brown may also refer to:

== Entertainment ==
- Paul H. Brown (1934–2016), American jazz bassist
- P. R. Brown or Paul R. Brown, graphic designer, photographer, music video and commercial director
- Paul Brown (costume designer) (1960–2017), British costume designer
- Paul Brown, American realist painter, worked on Museum of Polo and Hall of Fame
- Paul Brown, American actor, producer and screenwriter for First Wave
- "Brother" Paul Brown, keyboardist of The Waterboys since 2013
- Paul Dooley (born 1928), American actor born Paul Brown

== Politics ==
- Paul Brown (Georgia politician) (1880–1961), American lawyer and politician
- Paul Brown (Australian politician) (born 1969), member of the Western Australian Legislative Council
- J. Paul Brown (born 1953), member of the Colorado House of Representatives
- Paul C. Broun Sr. (1916–2005), American politician from Georgia
- Paul Broun (born 1946), American politician from Georgia and son of Paul C. Broun Sr.
- Paul W. Brown (Michigan politician) (born 1971/1972), American politician from Michigan

== Sports ==
- Paul Brown (baseball) (born 1941), American Major League Baseball pitcher
- Paul Brown (cricketer) (born 1965), English former cricketer
- Paul Brown (Australian footballer) (born 1969), Geelong player of the 1990s
- Paul Brown (racing driver) (1969–2012), American race-car driver
- Paul Brown (bowls) (born 1978), British lawn bowler
- Paul Brown (English footballer) (born 1984), English football midfielder
- Paul Brown (ice hockey) (born 1984), Canadian ice hockey player
- Paul Brown (Caymanian footballer) (born 1991), Caymanian football defender

== Other ==
- Paul Brown (American journalist) (born 1952), American radio journalist on Morning Edition
- Paul Brown (artist) (born 1947), British artist based in Australia
- Paul Brown (presenter) (1950–1997), British journalist television presenter
- Paul A. Brown (1938–2024), American academic, businessman and pathologist
- Paul Neeley Brown (1926–2012), American jurist and U.S. federal judge
- Paul J. Brown, American business executive
- Paul R. Brown, president of Monmouth University, West Long Branch, New Jersey
- Paul W. Brown (1915–2000), American jurist and associate justice of the Ohio Supreme Court
- Paul Brown, English journalist, founder of Unofficial Football World Championships in 2003

== See also ==
- Paul Brown Stadium in Cincinnati, Ohio
- Paul Brown Tiger Stadium in Massilon, Ohio
- Paul Browne (disambiguation)
