= 2012 Pirelli World Challenge =

Seasons
- ← 2011 2013 →

The 2012 Pirelli World Challenge season was the 23rd running of the Sports Car Club of America's World Challenge series. All races were televised by NBC Sports Network. All telecasts were tape-delayed, with all races being streamed live.

== Format change ==
The series began using a four class format. A new "touring car B-spec" class was introduced, similar to the SCCA's amateur divisions, using vehicles such as the Fiat 500, Chevrolet Sonic, Ford Fiesta, Honda Fit, Kia Rio, Mazda 2, and Nissan Versa. The new class debuted at the event at Miller.

== Schedule ==
Four rounds were announced November 11, 2011, with an additional three rounds announced November 18, and the round at St. Petersburg announced January 4. A second Touring Car race was later added to the Mid-Ohio round. The GT and GTS classes had 12 races, Touring Car had 14, and Touring Car B-Spec had 9.

Rnd	Date	Circuit	Location	Classes	Supporting
1	March 24	Streets of St. Petersburg	St. Petersburg, Florida	GT, GTS, TC (x2)	IndyCar Series
2	April 15	Streets of Long Beach	Long Beach, California	GT, GTS	IndyCar Series/American Le Mans Series
3	April 28–29	Miller Motorsports Park (Note: The GT and GTS classes raced on the 3.048-mile (4.905 km) Outer Course, while the TC and TCB classes raced on the 2.2-mile (3.5 km) West Course.)	Tooele, Utah	GT, GTS; TC, TCB (x3)	K&N Pro Series West
4	May 11	Mazda Raceway Laguna Seca	Monterey, California	GT, GTS, TC	American Le Mans Series
5	June 1–3	The Raceway on Belle Isle	Detroit, Michigan	GT, GTS (x2)	IndyCar Series
6	June 22–24	Canadian Tire Motorsport Park	Bowmanville, Ontario	GT, GTS (x2); TC, TCB (x3)	Headliner
7	August 3–5	Mid-Ohio Sports Car Course	Lexington, Ohio	GT, GTS, TC (x2)	IndyCar Series/American Le Mans Series
8	August 24	Sonoma Raceway (Indy course)	Sonoma, California	GT, GTS; TC, TCB (x3)	IndyCar Series

== Race results ==
Rnd	Circuit	GT Winning Car	GTS Winning Car	TC Winning Car	TCB Winning Car
Rnd	Circuit	GT Winning Driver	GTS Winning Driver	TC Winning Driver	TCB Winning Driver
1	St. Petersburg	#3 Cadillac CTS-V Coupe	#50 Ford Mustang Boss 302S	#03 Mazdaspeed3	Did not participate
1	St. Petersburg	(United States) Johnny O'Connell	(United Kingdom) Justin Bell	(United States) Michael Cooper	Did not participate
1	St. Petersburg	#1 Porsche 911 GT3	#50 Ford Mustang Boss 302S	#03 Mazdaspeed3	Did not participate
1	St. Petersburg	(United States) Lawson Aschenbach	(United Kingdom) Justin Bell	(United States) Michael Cooper	Did not participate
2	Long Beach	#8 Cadillac CTS-V Coupe	#68 Porsche Cayman S	Did not participate	Did not participate
2	Long Beach	(United Kingdom) Andy Pilgrim	(United States) Jack Baldwin	Did not participate	Did not participate
3	Miller Motorsport Park	Did not participate	Did not participate	#71 Honda Civic Si	#00 Fiat 500
3	Miller Motorsport Park	Did not participate	Did not participate	(United States) Todd Lamb	(United States) Jonathan Start
3	Miller Motorsport Park	Did not participate	Did not participate	#03 Mazdaspeed3	#00 Fiat 500
3	Miller Motorsport Park	Did not participate	Did not participate	(United States) Michael Cooper	(United States) Jonathan Start
3	Miller Motorsport Park	#1 Porsche 911 GT3	#20 Chevrolet Camaro	Did not participate	Did not participate
3	Miller Motorsport Park	(United States) Patrick Long	(United States) Andy Lee	Did not participate	Did not participate
3	Miller Motorsport Park	Did not participate	Did not participate	#33 Volkswagen GLI	#45 Honda Fit
3	Miller Motorsport Park	Did not participate	Did not participate	(United States) Tristan Herbert	(United States) Sage Marie
4	Laguna Seca	#6 Volvo S60	#42 Acura TSX	#71 Honda Civic Si	Did not participate
4	Laguna Seca	(United States) Randy Pobst	(United States) Peter Cunningham	(United States) Todd Lamb	Did not participate
5	Belle Isle	#3 Cadillac CTS-V Coupe	#20 Chevrolet Camaro	Did not participate	Did not participate
5	Belle Isle	(United States) Johnny O'Connell	(United States) Andy Lee	Did not participate	Did not participate
5	Belle Isle	#3 Cadillac CTS-V Coupe	#20 Chevrolet Camaro	Did not participate	Did not participate
5	Belle Isle	(United States) Johnny O'Connell	(United States) Andy Lee	Did not participate	Did not participate
6	Mosport Park	#02 Chevrolet Corvette Z06	#36 Kia Optima	Did not participate	Did not participate
6	Mosport Park	(United States) Mike Skeen	(United States) Michael Galati	Did not participate	Did not participate
6	Mosport Park	Did not participate	Did not participate	#43 Volkswagen GLI	#73 Honda Fit
6	Mosport Park	Did not participate	Did not participate	(United States) Jeff Altenburg	(Canada) Andre Rapone
6	Mosport Park	Did not participate	Did not participate	#03 Mazdaspeed3	#73 Honda Fit
6	Mosport Park	Did not participate	Did not participate	(United States) Michael Cooper	(Canada) Andre Rapone
6	Mosport Park	Did not participate	Did not participate	#82 Honda Civic Si	#73 Honda Fit
6	Mosport Park	Did not participate	Did not participate	(Canada) Gary Kwok	(Canada) Andre Rapone
6	Mosport Park	#02 Chevrolet Corvette Z06	#38 Kia Optima	Did not participate	Did not participate
6	Mosport Park	(United States) Mike Skeen	(Canada) Mark Wilkins	Did not participate	Did not participate
7	Mid-Ohio	#6 Volvo S60	#42 Acura TSX	#03 Mazdaspeed3	Did not participate
7	Mid-Ohio	(United States) Randy Pobst	(United States) Peter Cunningham	(United States) Michael Cooper	Did not participate
7	Mid-Ohio	#6 Volvo S60	#60 Porsche Cayman S	#71 Honda Civic Si	Did not participate
7	Mid-Ohio	(United States) Randy Pobst	(United States) Kevin Gleason	(United States) Todd Lamb	Did not participate
8	Sonoma	#9 Volvo S60	#20 Chevrolet Camaro	Did not participate	Did not participate
8	Sonoma	(United States) Alex Figge	(United States) Andy Lee	Did not participate	Did not participate
8	Sonoma	Did not participate	Did not participate	#08 Volvo C30	#45 Honda Fit
8	Sonoma	Did not participate	Did not participate	(United States) Robert Thorne	(United States) Conner Ford
8	Sonoma	Did not participate	Did not participate	#71 Honda Civic Si	#90 Kia Rio
8	Sonoma	Did not participate	Did not participate	(United States) Todd Lamb	(Bermuda) Russell Smith
8	Sonoma	Did not participate	Did not participate	#03 Mazdaspeed3	#92 Kia Rio
8	Sonoma	Did not participate	Did not participate	(United States) Michael Cooper	(United States) Jeff Lepper

== Championships ==
=== Drivers' Championships ===
Championship points are awarded to drivers based on qualifying and finishing positions. In addition, 5 bonus points are awarded to a driver leading a lap during a race, and 5 bonus points are awarded to the driver leading the most laps.

Position	1	2	3	4	5	6	7	8	9	10	11	12	13	14	15	16	17	18	19	20	21	22	23	24	25
Race	140	110	95	85	80	76	72	68	64	60	57	54	51	48	45	43	41	39	37	35	33	31	29	27	25
Qualifying	15	12	9	6	3	–	–	–	–	–	–	–	–	–	–	–	–	–	–	–	–	–	–	–	–

==== GT ====
Pos	Driver	Car	STP		LBH	UTA	LGA	DET		MOS		MOH		SON	Points
1	(United States) Johnny O'Connell	Cadillac CTS-V	1	2	3	2	7	1	1	2	10	3	7	5	1348
2	(United Kingdom) Andy Pilgrim	Cadillac CTS-V	5	3	1	4	3	3	4	10	5	4	5	2	1199
3	(United States) Randy Pobst	Volvo S60	12	9	2	5	1	15	9	11	DNS	1	1	3	1137
4	(United States) Lawson Aschenbach	Porsche 911 GT3	4	1	5		4	2	2	4	2	6	3	4	1112
5	(United States) Alex Figge	Volvo S60	3	12	13	13	2	4	3	12	3	12	2	1	1095
6	(United States) Mike Skeen	Nissan GTR	DNS	14	14			13	14			11	8	13	887
6	(United States) Mike Skeen	Chevrolet Corvette Z06				3	6			1	1				887
7	(United States) Steve Ott	Porsche 911 GT3	10	5	9	6	5	5	15	3	4	7	13		788
8	(United States) Tony Gaples	Chevrolet Corvette	8	6	16	9	11	11	10	5	6	8	9	12	767
9	(United States) James Sofronas	Porsche 911 GT3	2	4	4	6	15	7	5						723
9	(United States) James Sofronas	Audi R8 LMS										5	6		723
10	(United States) Jason Daskalos	Nissan GTR	13	DNS	17	12	14	14	12	9	11				417
11	(United States) Jeff Courtney	Porsche 911 GT3	7	7	15		12					14	10	9	415
12	(United States) Tomy Drissi	Porsche 911 GT3	6	11	6		9	8	7						413
13	(Canada) Fred Roberts	Dodge Viper						12	11	7	9	9	12	14	413
14	(United States) David Welch	Ferrari F430	9	8	10	DSQ								11	407
14	(United States) David Welch	Porsche 911 GT3						6	6						407
15	(United States) Brett Sandberg	Porsche 911 GT3								6	7	10	11	6	341
16	(United States) Anders Hainer	Audi R8 LMS			11	10	13	10	13					10	339
17	(United States) Madison Snow	Porsche 911 GT3				8		9	8	8	8				336
18	(United States) Justin Marks	Porsche 911 GT3	11	13	8	11	8								281
19	(United States) Jordan Taylor	Cadillac CTS-V										2	4		210
20	(United States) Dino Crescentini	Porsche 911 GT3	14	10	7		16								166
21	(United States) Patrick Long	Porsche 911 GT3				1									145
22	(United States) Patrick Lindsey	Chevrolet Corvette Z06										13	14	16	142
23	(United States) Brandon Davis	Porsche 911 GT3												7	72
24	(United States) Michael Hedlund	Porsche 911 GT3												8	68
25	(United States) Bret Curtis	Porsche 911 GT3					10								60
26	(United States) Brent Holden	Porsche 911 GT3			12									DNS	54
27	(United States) Craig Stanton	Mercedes-Benz CLK-AMG												15	45
28	(United States) Brian Kubinski	Chevrolet Corvette			18										39
29	(United States) Erich Joiner	Porsche 911 GT3				DNS									0
Pos	Driver	Car	STP		LBH	MIL	LGA	DET		MOS		MOH		SON	Points

Color	Result
Gold	Winner
Silver	2nd place
Bronze	3rd place
Green	4th & 5th place
Light Blue	6th–10th place
Dark Blue	Finished (Outside Top 10)
Purple	Did not finish
Red	Did not qualify (DNQ)
Brown	Withdrawn (Wth)
Black	Disqualified (DSQ)
White	Did not start (DNS)
Blank	Did not participate

==== GTS ====
Pos	Driver	Car	STP		LBH	MIL	LGA	DET		MOS		MOH		SON	Points
1	(United States) Peter Cunningham	Acura TSX	2	2	7	8	1	2	3	7	6	1	3	2	1366
2	(United States) Andy Lee (R)	Chevrolet Camaro	4	3	9	1	5	1	1	9	4	11	7	1	1264
3	(United States) Jack Baldwin	Porsche Cayman S	5	7	1	4	2	4	2	6	2	6	8	12	1185
4	(United States) Michael Galati	Kia Optima	7	10	11	3	6	8	6	1	5	5	5	5	1055
5	(United States) Nick Esayian	Acura TSX	17	5	4	5	4	6	9	17	12	2	9	16	859
6	(United Kingdom) Justin Bell	Ford Mustang	1	1	2	10	13	7	5			26	25	3	821
7	(Canada) Mark Wilkins	Kia Optima					8	11	15	2	1	7	6	4	705
8	(United States) Alec Udell	Ford Mustang	18	15		9	7	19	21	5	3	13	21	9	700
9	(United States) Brad Adams	Ford Mustang	9	8	6	6	14	9	8	11	8	15	16	15	690
10	(United States) Harry Curtin (R)	Chevrolet Camaro	12	17	10	16	9	17	10	12	11	24	13	8	620
11	(United States) Ric Bushey	Nissan 370Z	DNS		13	11	12	18	14	13	14	23	12	7	503
12	(Canada) Aaron Povoledo	Ford Mustang					3	3	18	4	15	10	19		497
13	(United States) Jason von Kluge	Ford Mustang	3	4				5	4			12	22		436
14	(United States) Richard Golinello	Ford Mustang	16	6				20	22	8	7	22	20		394
15	(United States) Don Istook	Audi TT RS			16	13	11	13	17			20	17	11	376
16	(United States) Roger Miller (R)	Ford Mustang	15	11	5			21	19			17	24	14	368
17	(United States) Karl Poeltl	Porsche 911	6	9						10	10	14	14		356
18	(United States) Bill Ziegler	Mitsubishi Lancer Evo	10	12	17	14	17	22							339
18	(United States) Bill Ziegler	Pontiac Solstice GXP										25	18	DNS	339
19	(United States) Brian Kleeman (R)	Nissan 370Z	11	14	15			16	20			19	11	DNS	322
20	(United States) Kevin Gleason	Porsche Cayman S										3	1		263
21	(United States) Todd Napieralski (R)	Chevrolet Camaro	19	13				14	11			16	15		257
22	(United States) Mark Klenin	BMW M3				12	10	10	13			18	DNS		234
23	(United States) Dane Moxlow	Ford Mustang					16	12	7	DNS		21	23		231
24	(United States) Greg Shaffer	Nissan 370Z	13	19	14		15			15	DNS				226
25	(United States) Al Carter	BMW M3										4	2		207
26	(United States) Colin Braun	Kia Optima	14	16	3	2									198
27	(United States) Alfonso Perri (R)	Ford Mustang	8	18	12	DNS									161
28	(United States) Paul Brown	Ford Mustang								3	9				159
29	(United States) Mark Boden	BMW M3										9	4		149
30	(United States) Lou Gigliotti	Chevrolet Camaro			8									6	144
31	(United States) Charles Putman	BMW M3										8	10		128
32	(United States) Craig Capaldi	Ford Mustang						15	12						99
33	(Canada) Ernie Jakubowski	Porsche Cayman S								14	13				99
34	(United States) Ben Crosland	Ford Mustang				7									72
35	(United States) Robert Stout	Nissan 370Z						23	16						72
36	(United States) Bryan Heitkotter (R)	Nissan 370Z												10	60
37	(United States) Vafa Kordestani (R)	Maserati Trofeo												13	51
38	(United States) Dan McKeever	Ford Mustang				15									45
39	(United States) Steven Goldman	Chevrolet Camaro								16					43
40	(United States) Tom Felt	Honda S2000 CR				17									41
41	(United States) Scott Bove	BMW M3				DNS									0
Pos	Driver	Car	STP		LBH	MIL	LGA	DET		MOS		MOH		SON	Points

==== TC ====
Pos	Driver	Car	STP		MIL			LGA	MOS			MOH		SON			Points
1	(United States) Michael Cooper (R)	Mazdaspeed3	1	1	4	1	4	5	2	1	4	1	14	3	2	1	1767
2	(United States) Todd Lamb (R)	Honda Civic Si	2	2	1	3	2	1	3	6	10	3	1	2	1	2	1659
3	(United States) Ryan Winchester (R)	Honda Civic Si	9	13	2	2	3	DSQ	4	7	2	5	2	5	5	3	1212
4	(United States) Shea Holbrook	Honda Civic Si	5	12	5	4	5	4	7	2	3	6	11	4	4	4	1119
5	(Canada) Patrick Seguin	Volkswagen Golf GTI	13	10	11	10	9	3	DNS	9	8	14	12	8	8	9	810
6	(United States) Tristan Herbert	Volkswagen Golf GTI	10	3													671
6	(United States) Tristan Herbert	Volkswagen Jetta GLI			12	11	1	7	6	8	DNS	DSQ	DNS				671
7	(Peru) Gustavo Michelsen (R)	Honda Civic Si	4	7	3	6	7	6									476
8	(United States) Jeff Altenburg	Volkswagen Jetta GLI	7	11				2	1	10	DNS						456
9	(United States) Travis Wolcott (R)	Volkswagen Jetta GLI										2	8	6	3	10	439
10	(United States) Robb Holland	Honda Civic Si	6	5													432
10	(United States) Robb Holland	Volkswagen Jetta GLI			10	5	11	DNS									432
10	(United States) Robb Holland	Volkswagen Golf GTI											6				432
11	(Canada) Karl Thomson	Honda Civic Si			6	9	10							11	6	8	416
12	(United States) Peter Schwartzott	Honda Civic Si							DNS	DNS		10	4	7	9	5	361
13	(United States) Fred Emich (R)	Volkswagen Jetta GLI						8	11	DNS	5	7	10				337
14	(United States) Robert Thorne (R)	Volvo C30												1	7	7	306
15	(Canada) Gary Kwok (R)	Honda Civic Si							5	DSQ	1						228
16	(Canada) Tom Kwok (R)	Honda Civic Si							8	3	9						227
17	(United States) Steve Blethen (R)	Mazda RX-8							9	5	6						220
18	(United States) Michael Pettiford	Volkswagen Jetta GLI			7	7	6										220
19	(Canada) Marlin Langeveldt (R)	Mazda RX-8							10	4	7						217
20	(United States) Tommy Boileau (R)	Mazda RX-8			8	8	8										204
21	(United States) Tom Lepper	Chevrolet Cobalt SS												10	10	6	196
22	(Canada) Anthony Rapone (R)	Honda Civic Si	3	4					DNS	DNS							189
23	(United States) Don Istook	Volkswagen Jetta GLI												9	11	11	178
24	(Sweden) Carl Rydquist (R)	Mazda RX-8										13	DNS	12	DNS	12	159
25	(United States) Ray Mason III	Honda Civic Si										8	5				148
26	(United States) Carl Hober	Honda Civic	8	8													136
27	(Canada) Aaron Povoledo	Volkswagen Jetta GLI	12	6													130
28	(Venezuela) Roberto Ricciardelli (R)	Volkswagen Jetta GLI	11	9													121
29	(United States) David Tuaty	Honda Civic Si										12	9				118
30	(United States) Tom Martin (R)	Volkswagen Golf GTI										9	13				115
31	(United States) Ian Baas	Volkswagen Golf GTI										DSQ	3				101
32	(Venezuela) Alex Popow	Volkswagen Golf GTI										4					97
33	(Belgium) Jan Heylen	Volkswagen Jetta GLI			9	DNS	DNS										84
34	(United States) Brandon Peterson	Honda Civic											7				72
35	(United States) Bob Roth (R)	Honda Civic										11					57
36	(United States) J.D. Mobley	Mazda RX-8			DSQ	DSQ	12										57
37	(Venezuela) Enzo Riccardelli	Volkswagen Jetta GLI	DNS														0
Pos	Driver	Car	STP		MIL			LGA	MOS			MOH		SON			Points

==== TCB ====
Pos	Driver	Car	MIL			MOS			SON			Points
1	(United States) Jonathan Start (R)	Fiat 500	1	1	4	3	3	3	4	5	5	946
2	(United States) Craig Capaldi (R)	Ford Fiesta	3	3	3	2	2	5				651
3	(Bermuda) Russell Smith (R)	Kia Rio	7	6	6				2	1	2	630
4	(United States) Connor Ford (R)	Honda Fit	5	DNS	2				1	2	3	584
5	(Canada) Andre Rapone (R)	Honda Fit				1	1	1				480
6	(United States) Sage Marie	Honda Fit	4	4	1							335
7	(United States) Braden Miller (R)	Ford Fiesta	6	5					6	4	DNS	329
8	(United States) Steve Gatrell (R)	Honda Fit							3	3	4	293
9	(United States) Peter Schwartzott, Jr. (R)	Mazda 2				5	4	4				262
10	(United States) Shaun Bailey	Mazda 2	2	2	DSQ							252
11	(United States) Brad Adams	Mazda 2							5	6	6	235
12	(Canada) Jim Kenzie	Kia Rio				6	6	6				234
13	(United States) Jeff Lepper	Kia Rio			5						1	230
14	(Canada) PJ Groenke (R)	Mini Cooper				4	5					165
15	(United States) Joel Lipperini	Honda Fit						2				110
16	(United States) Dan McKeever	Ford Fiesta			DSQ							0
17	(United States) Michael J. Lliteras	Kia Rio	DNS	DNS								0
Pos	Driver	Car	MIL			MOS			SON			Points

=== Manufacturer championships ===
Manufacturer points are awarded according to the highest-finishing car from that manufacturer. Only manufacturers that are SCCA Pro Racing corporate members receive points. Points are awarded on the following basis:

Position	1	2	3	4	5	6
Points	9	7	5	3	2	1

In addition, one bonus point is awarded to the pole-winning manufacturer. In the table below, the manufacturer's top finishing position is shown, with pole winner in bold.

==== GT ====
Pos	Manufacturer	STP		LBH	MIL	LGA	DET		MOS		MOH		SON	Points
1	(United States) Cadillac	1	2	1	2	3	1	**1**	2	5	2	4	2	82
2	(Sweden) Volvo	3	9	**2**	5	**1**	**4**	3	11	3	**1**	**1**	**1**	69
3	(Germany) Porsche	2	**1**	4	**1**	4	2	2	3	2	6	3	4	68
4	(United States) Chevrolet	**8**	6	16	3	6	11	10	**1**	**1**	8	9	12	28
5	(Japan) Nissan	13	14	14	12	14	13	12	9	11	11	8	13	0
Pos	Manufacturer	STP		LBH	MIL	LGA	DET		MOS		MOH		SON	Points

Color	Result
Gold	Winner
Silver	2nd place
Bronze	3rd place
Green	4th–6th place
Dark Blue	Finished (Outside Points)
Purple	Did not finish
Blank	Did not participate

==== GTS ====
Pos	Manufacturer	STP		LBH	MIL	LGA	DET		MOS		MOH		SON	Points
1	(Japan) Acura	2	**2**	**4**	**5**	**1**	2	3	7	6	**1**	**3**	2	68
2	(United States) Ford	1	1	2	6	3	3	4	3	3	10	16	3	54
3	(United States) Chevrolet	**4**	3	8	1	5	**1**	**1**	9	4	11	7	1	52
4	(South Korea) Kia	7	10	3	2	6	8	6	**1**	**1**	5	5	4	41
5	(Japan) Nissan	11	14	13	11	12	16	14	13	14	19	11	7	0
Pos	Manufacturer	STP		LBH	MIL	LGA	DET		MOS		MOH		SON	Points

==== TC ====
Pos	Manufacturer	STP		MIL			LGA	MOS			MOH		SON			Points
1	(Japan) Honda	2	2	1	**2**	**2**	1	3	2	1	3	1	2	1	2	106
2	(Japan) Mazda	**1**	1	4	1	4	5	**2**	1	**4**	**1**	**14**	**3**	2	**1**	91
3	(Germany) Volkswagen	7	**3**	**7**	5	1	**2**	1	**8**	5	2	3	6	3	9	56
4	(Sweden) Volvo												1	**7**	7	10
Pos	Manufacturer	STP		MIL			LGA	MOS			MOH		SON			Points

==== TCB ====
Pos	Manufacturer	MIL			MOS			SON			Points
1	(Japan) Honda	4	4	1	**1**	**1**	**1**	1	**2**	3	67
2	(Italy) Fiat	1	**1**	4	3	3	3	4	5	5	44
3	(United States) Ford	**3**	3	3	2	2	5	6	4	7	36
4	(South Korea) Kia	7	6	5	6	6	6	**2**	1	**1**	33
5	(Japan) Mazda	2	2	**6**	5	4	4	5	6	6	28
Pos	Manufacturer	MIL			MOS			SON			Points
