= Paul Browne =

Paul Browne may refer to:

- Paul Browne (archer) (born 1961), British Paralympic archer
- Paul Browne (footballer) (born 1975), retired Scottish football defender
- Paul Browne (hurler) (born 1989), Irish hurler

== See also ==
- Paul Brown (disambiguation)
