= Paul Brown (American journalist) =

American journalist and musician

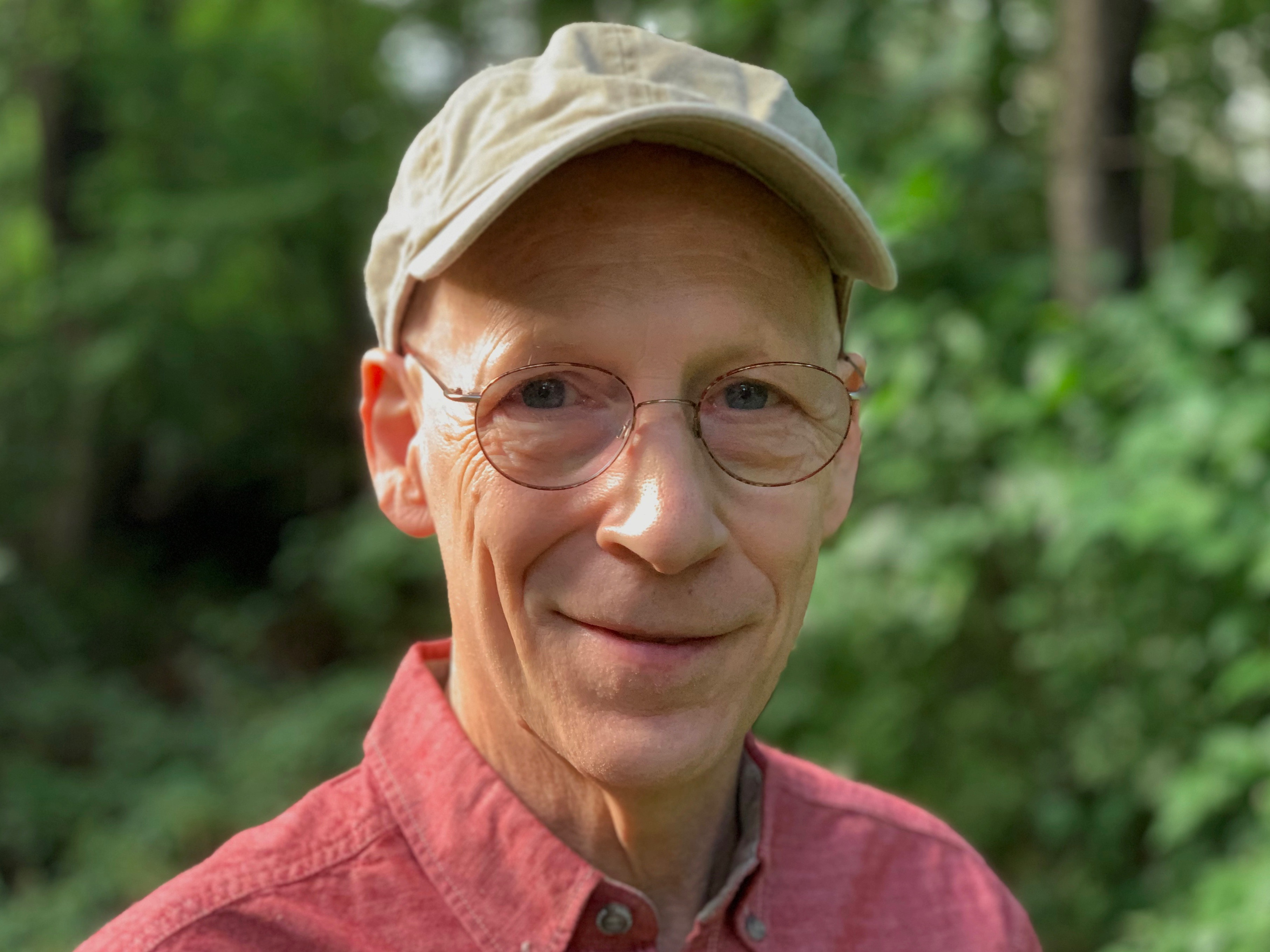
- right

Background information
- Born: May 2, 1952 (age 74); New York, New York, United States
- Genre: Old-time music
- Occupations: Singer, musician, journalist
- Instruments: banjo, guitar, fiddle
- Website: paulbrown.us.com

Paul Brown (born May 2, 1952, New York, NY) is an American journalist and musician. He began his radio and journalism career at commercial radio station WPAQ in Mount Airy, NC. He began work in public radio in 1987, at NPR member station WFDD in Winston-Salem, NC. From 1999 to late 2013, he worked at NPR's Washington, DC headquarters as a news executive, editor, producer, reporter and world newscaster. He is a traditional musician who acquired his first repertoire from his Virginia-born mother. He is best known in music circles as a banjo player, fiddler and singer. He has documented musicians and music traditions, primarily in the southeastern US, and produced numerous recordings.

== Recordings ==
- Been Riding with Old Mosby with Frank Bode and Tommy Jarrell (Folkways Records) (1986)
- Robert Sykes & The Surry County Boys (Heritage Records) (1987)
- Mike Seeger: Fresh Old Time String Band Music (Rounder Records) (1988) [Brown plays on two tracks and sings on one of them]
- Mike Seeger & Paul Brown: Way Down In North Carolina (Rounder Records) (1996)
- Benton Flippen: Old Time, New Times(Rounder Records) (1996)
- Blue Ridge Mountain Holiday: The Breaking Up Christmas Story (County Records) (1998)
- Paul Brown: Red Clay Country (5-String Productions) (2006)
- Benton Flippen & The Smokey Valley Boys: An Evening at WPAQ, 1984 (5-String Productions) (2008)
- The Mostly Mountain Boys (L-Century) (2013)
- Paul Brown and Company: Red Dog (Ryland Records) (2018)
- Bryant and Brown (Tiki Parlour Recordings) (2018)
- Paul Brown (Tiki Parlour Recordings) (2018)
