= Paula Brown (biochemist) =

Canadian science researcher

- Education: University of British Columbia; Simon Fraser University; Dalhousie University
- Known for: Phytoanalytics
- Scientific career
- Fields: mass spectrometry, high-performance liquid chromatography, analytical method development, chemometrics; natural product chemistry, validation studies, plant metabolomics

Paula N. Brown is a Canadian science researcher, currently at British Columbia Institute of Technology. She is the Tier 2 Canada Research Chair in Phytoanalytics.

In this position, Brown investigates the large range of chemical products made by plants, included how they are synthesized, regulated, and allocated within the tissues of plants, details of their extraction, as well as their role in plant and human health.

Brown is the Director of BCIT's Natural Health and Food Products Research Group (NRG) which works to actively support the Natural Health Products (NHP) industry for more than twenty-five years.

In 2018 Brown was appointed as a visiting Professor of Pharmacy Science of Hunan University of Chinese Medicine.

== Education ==
Brown received a BSc Honours in Chemistry and Biochemistry from Dalhousie University in Halifax, Nova Scotia in 1995. She continued on in 1998 to receive a MSc in Chemistry from Simon Fraser University and in 2011 completed her PhD in Chemistry from the University of British Columbia.

== Awards ==
Paula Brown has earned many awards including the following.

- 2016 – First Place Blue Ribbon from the American Urological Association.
- 2016 – Neil Towers Award from the Natural Health Product Research Society of Canada.
- 2016 – Herbal Insight Award from the American Herbal Products Association.
- 2013 – Thieme Award for the Most Innovative Planta Medica Original Paper.
