= Paul Brown (racing driver) =

American racing driver

Paul Brown (July 8, 1969 – October 13, 2012) was an American race car driver. In 2011, he won the Pirelli World Challenge GTS Driver's Championship.

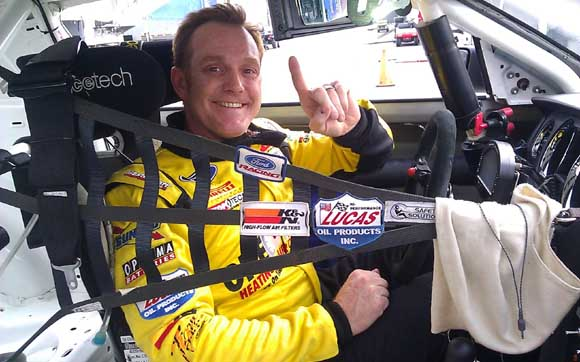
Paul Brown in #50 Boss 302S after Laguna Seca victory and clinching 2011 PWC Championship

He was born in July 1969 to famous Mustang chassis and tuning specialist Kenny Brown and Sylvia Musil, and at the age of 16, Paul entered his first race via SCCA autocross. Developing a passion for the hobby, he began to race professionally in a Kenny Brown Mustang in his early twenties. Notably, in 1987, he served as a crew member for his father's race team, where they won all four categories (GT, SS, A, and B) in the Escort Endurance Championship. As a professional, Paul competed in SCCA racing for most of his career with 44 starts to his name and earning 24 top 10 and 11 top five finishes.

In the early 2000's, he began working for Tiger Racing, a vintage race team that Tom and Bea Hollfelder formed. Tiger Racing is also where and when he would meet his wife, Carol Hollfelder. They married on September 17, 2005. Carol was a mainstay at racing events and an accomplished World Challenge racer in her own right and was regularly seen at Paul's side. In 2006, Paul won the NASA National Race in the American Iron Extreme (AIX) category. Other wins of note include two wins at the 2005 Monterey Historics and a 2004 finish at the Le Mans Historic 24 hrs in a 1971 Ferrari 512 M.

Due to his racing history and connection to Tiger Racing, which specialized in carbon fiber and fiberglass part construction, Paul and the Tiger Racing team were tasked with developing the first Boss 302S. Their efforts were developed into a documentary produced by Allan Crocket entitled B5141872: The Birth of a Boss S Mustang.

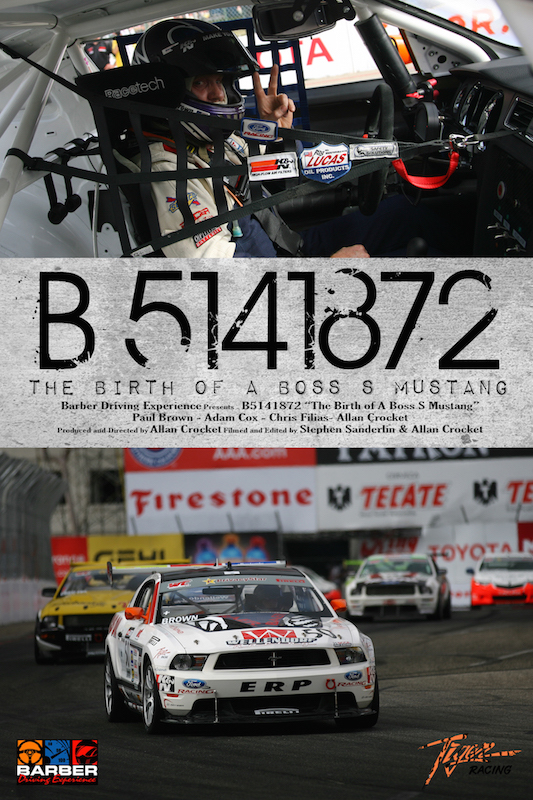
Cover Image of B5141872 Documentary

During the car's development, many of the parts created became stock pieces on the later production Boss 302S's built by Watson Racing and Ford Racing/Ford Performance. The two most notable parts are the Tiger Racing carbon hood and the G-Stream carbon rear wing.

In 2011 Paul won the Pirelli World Challenge GTS Driver's Championship, where his #50 became known, as it took 50 starts to achieve his first outright win. In the 2011 PWC season Paul entered 12 races, winning five, placing top ten 10 times, top 5 nine times, and winning the PWC Drivers title with one race remaining. This was the first championship win in a Boss 302, since Parnelli Jones' 1970 Trans-Am season, also in a Boss 302 Mustang. During his championship winning season, Paul led more laps than all other GTS competitors combined, setting the fastest lap in seven of 12 races.

Paul and the Tiger Racing team struggled to find sponsor support despite the record pace and repeated victories. The team made several sacrifices throughout the 2011 season as they worked to meet the financial requirements to transport, repair, and maintain the Boss 302S for races that spanned from St. Petersburg, Florida, to Laguna Seca Raceway, California.

In March 2012, Paul was diagnosed with metastatic melanoma just before the 2012 Pirelli World Challenge season opener but kept it hidden from fans. Good friend and accomplished racer Justin Bell campaigned on his behalf and won the season's first two races. Despite a terminal diagnosis, Paul entered the 2012 Pirelli World Challenge race at Canadian Motorsports Park, formally Mosport International Raceway, on June 22–24. The event was a double-header. In the first race, Paul finished third with a near second place at the finish line. In the second race, his car suffered engine damage, and he finished 9th.

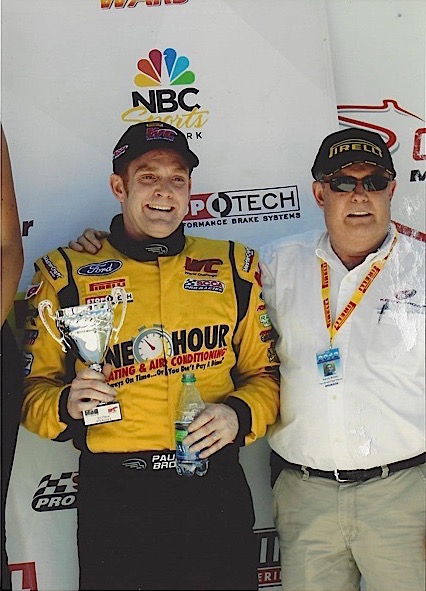
Although he was incredibly ill from cancer, Paul Brown still wheeled his Mustang to one last podium in June of 2012. He’s pictured here alongside his father Kenny Brown.

In his last race, on July 15, 2012, Paul raced the Tiger Racing Ferrari 512M in the G1-Historic Can-Am field. Despite suffering from Stage 4 cancer and no additional treatment, Paul started in the last rows of a 35-car field and worked his way up to sixth overall and a class win.

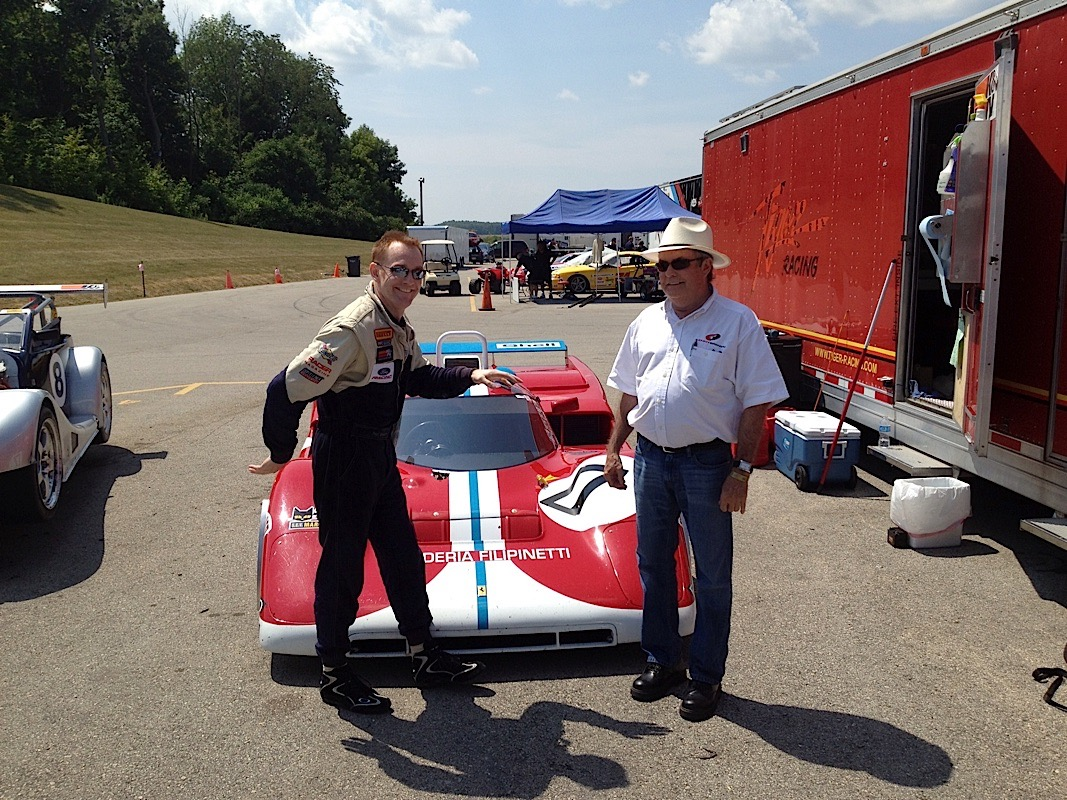
Pauls Final Race July 15, 2012

On October 15, 2012, Brown died at his home in Covina, California. He was 43 years of age.
