= Chevrolet Corvette (C6) =

Sixth generation of the Corvette sports car

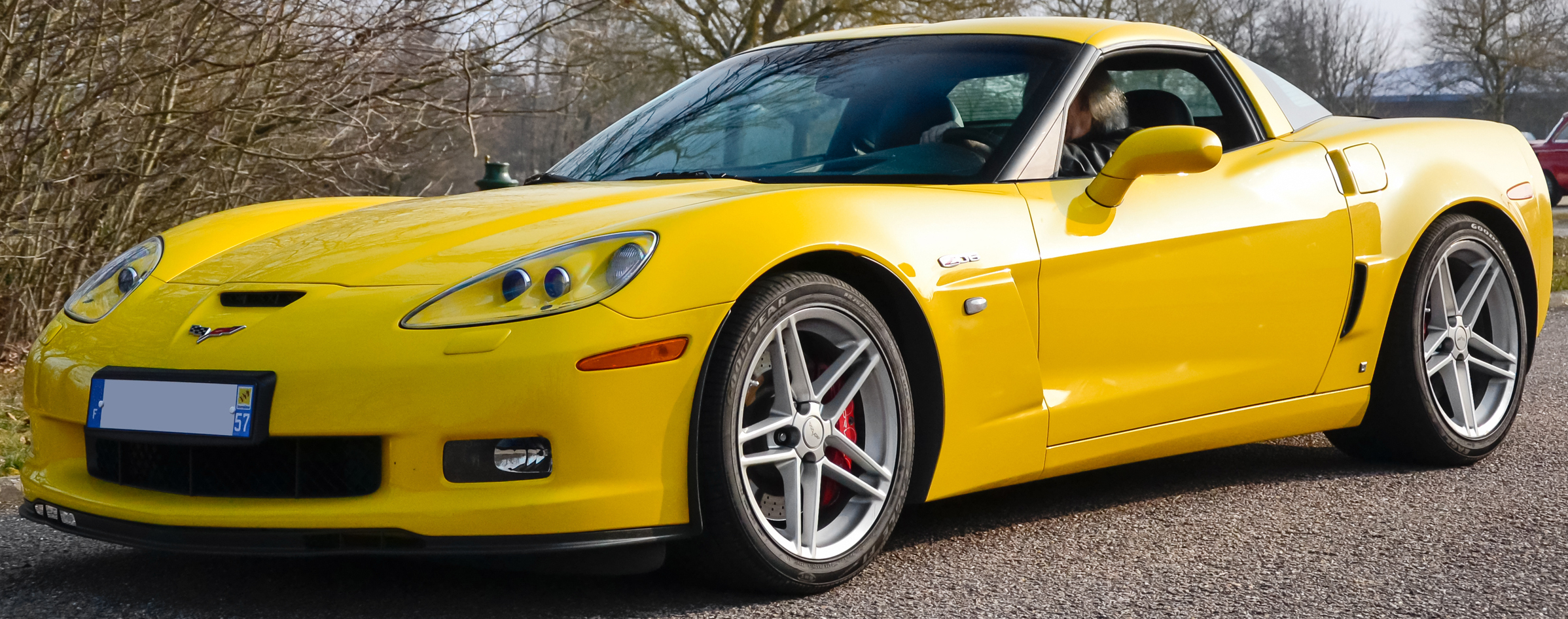
- Chevrolet Corvette Z06

Overview
- Manufacturer: Chevrolet (General Motors)
- Also called: Corvette (Europe, 2005–2010)
- Production: June 2004 – February 28, 2013
- Model years: 2005–2013
- Assembly: United States: Bowling Green, Kentucky (Bowling Green Assembly Plant)
- Designer: Tom Peters (2001)

Body and chassis
- Class: Sports car (S)
- Body style: 2-door coupe (Z06 and ZR1 only); 2-door convertible; 2-door targa top
- Layout: Front mid-engine, rear-wheel-drive
- Platform: Y-body/GMX245
- Related: Cadillac XLR

Powertrain
- Engine: 6.0 L LS2 V8; 6.2 L LS3 V8; 7.0 L LS7 V8; 6.2 L LS9 supercharged V8
- Transmission: 6-speed Borg-Warner T-56 manual; 6-speed Tremec TR-6060 manual; 4-speed 4L65-E automatic (only for 2005); 6-speed 6L80 automatic; (2006–2013)

Dimensions
- Wheelbase: 105.6 in (2,682 mm)
- Length: 174.6 in (4,435 mm); 175.6 in (4,460 mm) (Z06, ZR1)
- Width: 72.6 in (1,844 mm); 75.9 in (1,928 mm) (Grand Sport, Z06, ZR1)
- Height: Coupe: 49 in (1,245 mm); 2005–06 Convertible: 49.2 in (1,250 mm); 2007–09 Convertible: 49.1 in (1,247 mm); Z06 Coupe: 49.0 in (1,245 mm); 2010– Convertible: 48.7 in (1,237 mm)
- Curb weight: Z51: 3,273 lb (1,485 kg); Grandsport: 3,309 lb (1,501 kg); Z06: 3,147 lb (1,427 kg); Z06 Z07: 3,073 lb (1,394 kg); ZR1: 3,350 lb (1,520 kg)

Chronology
- Predecessor: Chevrolet Corvette (C5)
- Successor: Chevrolet Corvette (C7)

The Chevrolet Corvette (C6) is the sixth generation of the Corvette sports car that was produced by Chevrolet from 2005 to 2013. It is the first Corvette with exposed headlamps (as opposed to hidden headlamps) since the 1962 model. Production variants include the Z06, ZR1, Grand Sport, and 427 Convertible. Racing variants include the C6.R, an American Le Mans Series GT1 championship and 24 Hours of Le Mans GTE-Pro winner.

== Overview ==
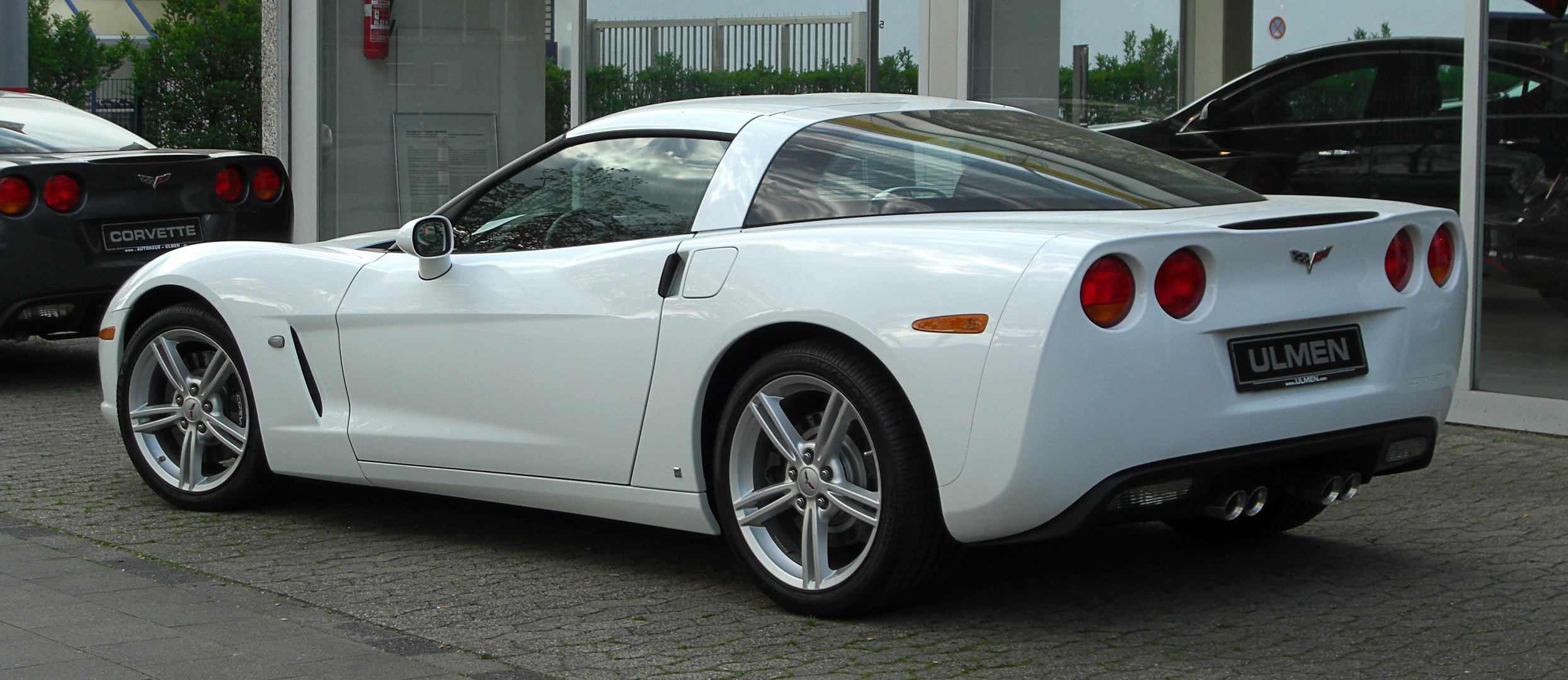
Chevrolet Corvette coupe (EU)

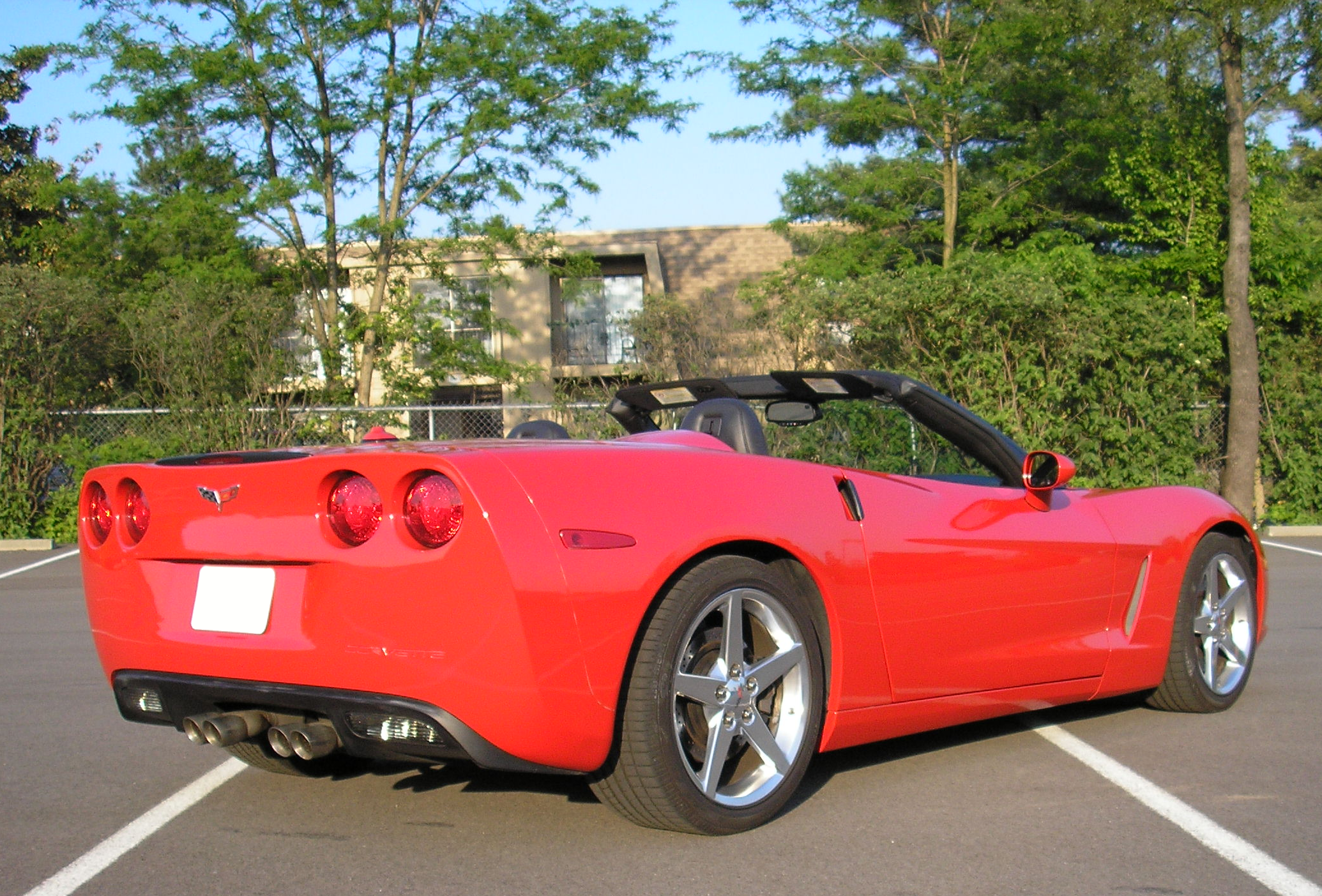
Chevrolet Corvette convertible

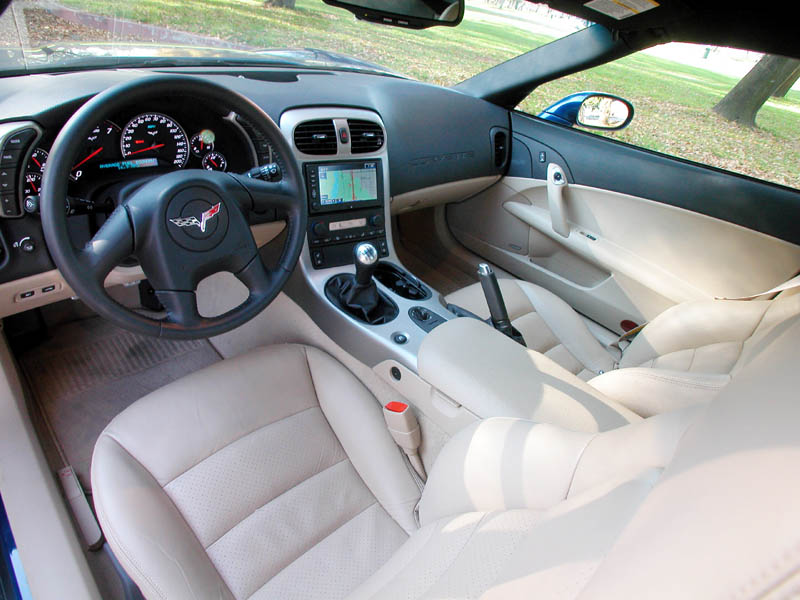
Chevrolet Corvette C6 interior

The Corvette C6 featured new bodywork with exposed headlamps, revised suspension geometry, a larger passenger compartment, a larger 5,967 cc (364.1 cu in; 6.0 L) V8 engine and a higher level of refinement. It is 5.1 inches (13 cm) shorter than the C5, but the wheelbase was increased by 1.2 inches (3 cm). It is also one inch (2.5 cm) narrower. Like its predecessor, the coupe featured a removable roof panel, either solid in body color or transparent black. The open version featured a power soft top (option not available on the C5). The new GM LS2 engine has a power output of 400 hp (298 kW) at 6,000 rpm and 400 lb⋅ft (542 N⋅m) of torque at 4,400 rpm. Like the C5, the Corvette C6's suspension consisted of independent unequal-length double wishbones with transverse fiberglass mono-leaf springs and optional magnetorheological dampers. Since 2004, a Z51 package has been available, which included a stiffer suspension, larger brakes, a transmission oil cooler, and more. The European version had parking lights in the headlights, headlight washers, side turn signals on the fenders (Grand Sport, ZR1 - different side mirrors with a signal), amber side marker lights, different rear lights with a turn signal and rear fog lights.

With an automatic transmission, the Corvette achieves city/highway fuel economies of 15 / 25 mpg_{‑US} (15.7 / 9.4 L/100 km; 18 / 30 mpg_{‑imp}), while the manual-transmission model returns 16 / 26 mpg_{‑US} (14.7 / 9.0 L/100 km; 19 / 31 mpg_{‑imp}). The Corvette's manual transmission is fitted with Computer Aided Gear Shifting (CAGS), which forces the driver to shift from 1st gear directly to 4th when operating at lower engine speeds. This boosts the EPA's derived fuel economy, allowing the buyer to avoid paying the "gas guzzler" tax. GM badges were added to the car in 2006.

Beginning with the 2008 model year, the Corvette received a new engine, the LS3. With displacement increased to 6,162 cc (376.0 cu in; 6.2 L), power was increased to 430 hp (321 kW) at 6,500 rpm and 424 lb⋅ft (575 N⋅m) of torque at 4,600 rpm, or 436 hp (325 kW) and 428 lb⋅ft (580 N⋅m) with the optional vacuum actuated valve exhaust. The earlier Tremec T56 manual transmission was replaced with the newer TR6060 in the 2008 model year. Manual Corvette models now had improved shift linkage; the automatic model was set up for quicker shifts, and (according to Chevrolet) accelerates from 0 to 60 mph (97 km/h) in 4.0 seconds, faster than any other production automatic Corvette model. From 2008 onward, the steering was revised for improved feel and the wheels were updated to a new five-spoke design. The last Corvette C6, a white 427 convertible, was completed on February 28, 2013.

=== Z06 ===
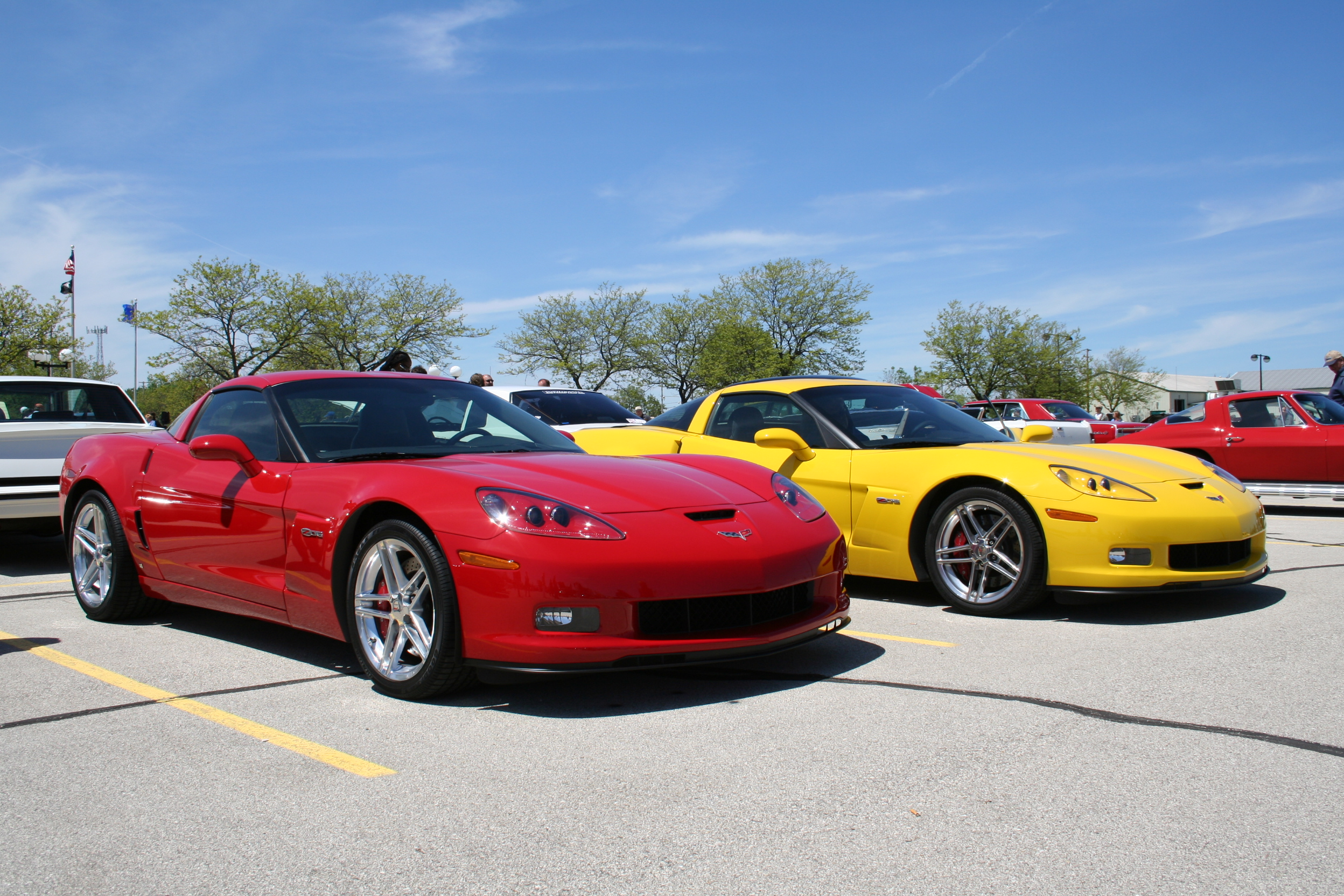

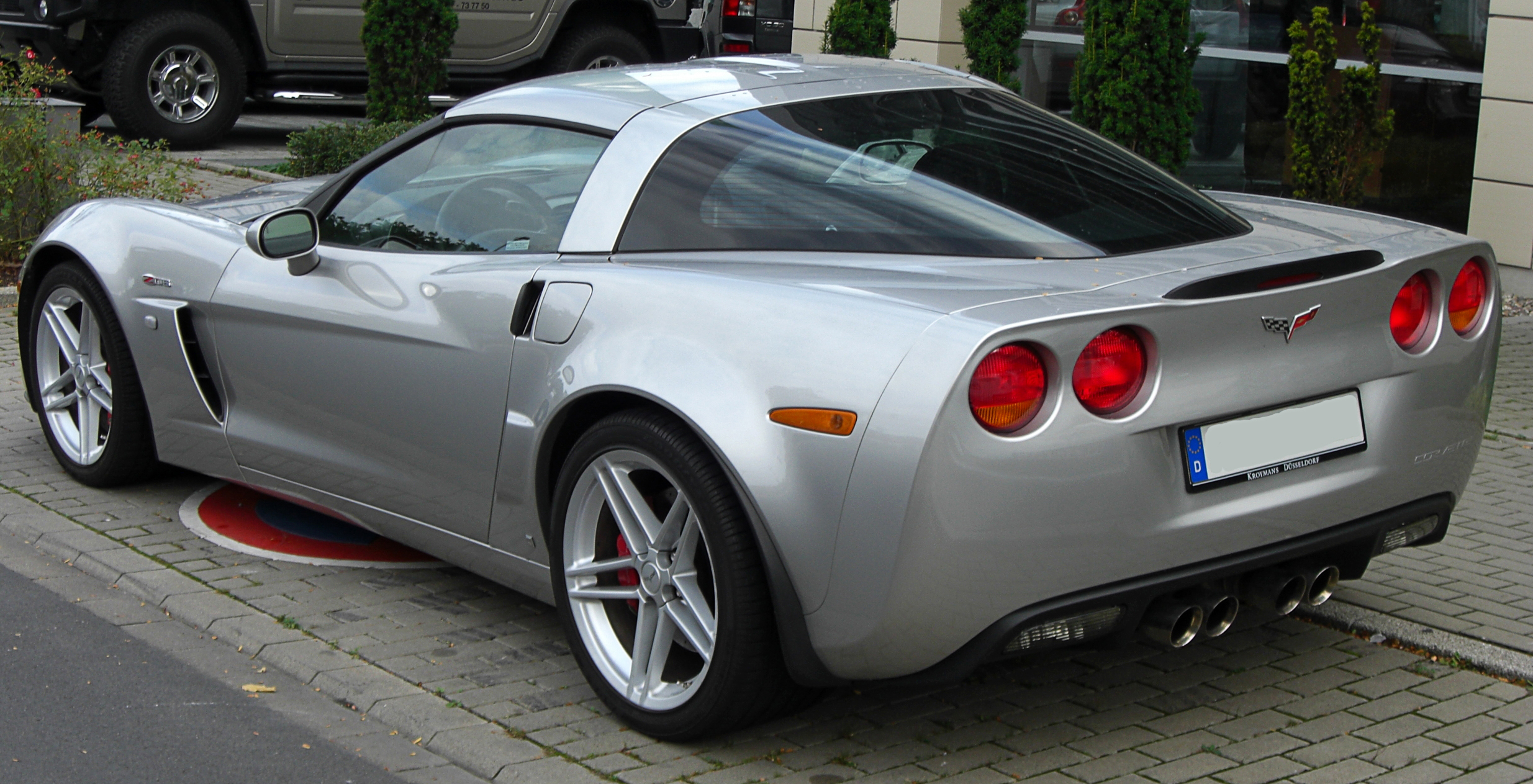
Corvette Z06 (below EU spec)

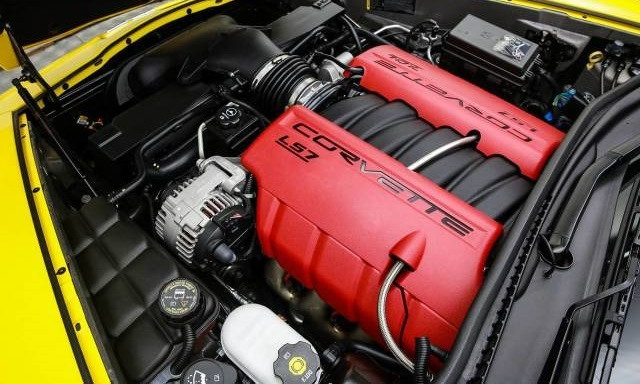
The 7.0 L LS7 V8 engine

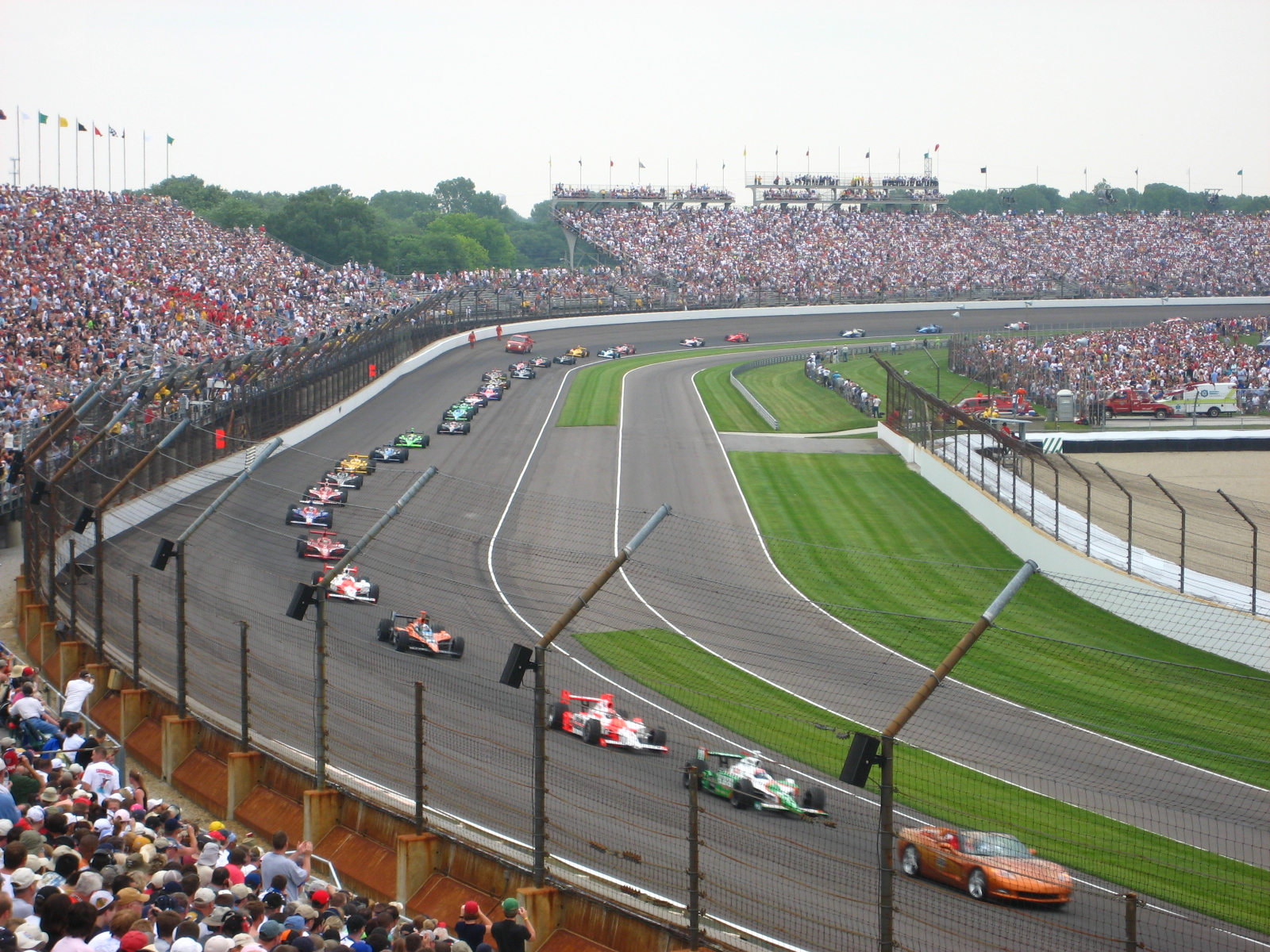
The pace car (orange Corvette) leads the field at the 2007 Indianapolis 500.

The Z06 arrived for the 2006 model year as a homologation vehicle in the third quarter of 2005 and is the lightest of all Corvette models. The Z06 was equipped with the largest-displacement small-block engine ever produced, a new 7,011 cc (7.0 L; 427.8 cu in) V8 engine codenamed the LS7. The engine has a power output of 505 hp (512 PS; 377 kW) at 6,300 rpm and 470 lb⋅ft (637 N⋅m) at 4,800 rpm of torque. Until the introduction of the LT6 engine in October 2021, the LS7 was the most powerful production naturally-aspirated engine made by General Motors. In addition to the larger displacement engine, the Corvette Z06 has a dry sump oiling system, and connecting rods made out of titanium alloy. The frame of the Z06 is constructed from aluminum, saving 136 lb (62 kg) over the prior generation C5's steel frame. Other weight saving measures such as balsa wood/carbon fiber composite floors and a magnesium alloy engine cradle were used. The Z06's body differentiates itself from the standard Corvette with its larger front and rear fenders and an intake inlet scoop on the front bumper. The front fenders are constructed with carbon fiber and the rear fenders contain ducts to aid in cooling the rear brakes. The Z06 weighed 3,130 lb (1,420 kg), giving it a weight to power ratio of 6.2 pounds per horsepower (3.8 kg/kW), allowing it to achieve a fuel economy of 15 mpg_{‑US} (16 L/100 km; 18 mpg_{‑imp}) in the city and 24 mpg_{‑US} (9.8 L/100 km; 29 mpg_{‑imp}) on the highway. The Z06 was the official pace car for both the 2006 Daytona 500 and the Indianapolis 500 race. Car and Driver recorded a 0–60 mph (97 km/h) acceleration time of 3.6 seconds and 1/4 mile in 11.7 seconds at 125 mph (201 km/h) in October 2005. The Z06 contains the following enhancements over the standard C6 Corvette:

- Hand-built LS7 V8 with dry sump oiling system
- Aluminum chassis with fixed roof
- Larger/stiffer anti-sway bars
- Stiffer springs and shocks
- Larger rear spoiler and front splitter
- Transmission cooler
- Unique front fascia with intake inlet
- Wider carbon fiber front and fiberglass rear fenders
- Functional front and rear brake ducts for added brake system cooling
- Unique light weight forged aluminum 18-inch front and 19-inch rear wheels; painted finish standard and chromed finish optional
- Wider 275/35ZR18 tires in the front and wider 325/30ZR19 tires in the rear
- Larger 6-piston front and 4-piston rear calipers, including cross-drilled 355 mm (14.0 in) front rotors and 340 mm (13 in) rear rotors
- Optional 1LZ, 2LZ, and 3LZ trim packages.

For the 2011 model year, the Z06 Carbon Edition was introduced, which carries over multiple parts from the ZR1 including carbon ceramic brakes, active suspension, and a number of carbon fiber pieces, including the hood and, optionally, the roof panel. Only 500 were planned for production and actual production numbers were much lower, with only about 250 made in total. In 2012 and 2013, these options could be ordered through the Z07 package on the Z06. Additionally, it was only available in Inferno Orange and Supersonic Blue exterior colors, and the interior features unique Z06 Carbon emblem accents.

=== ZR1 ===
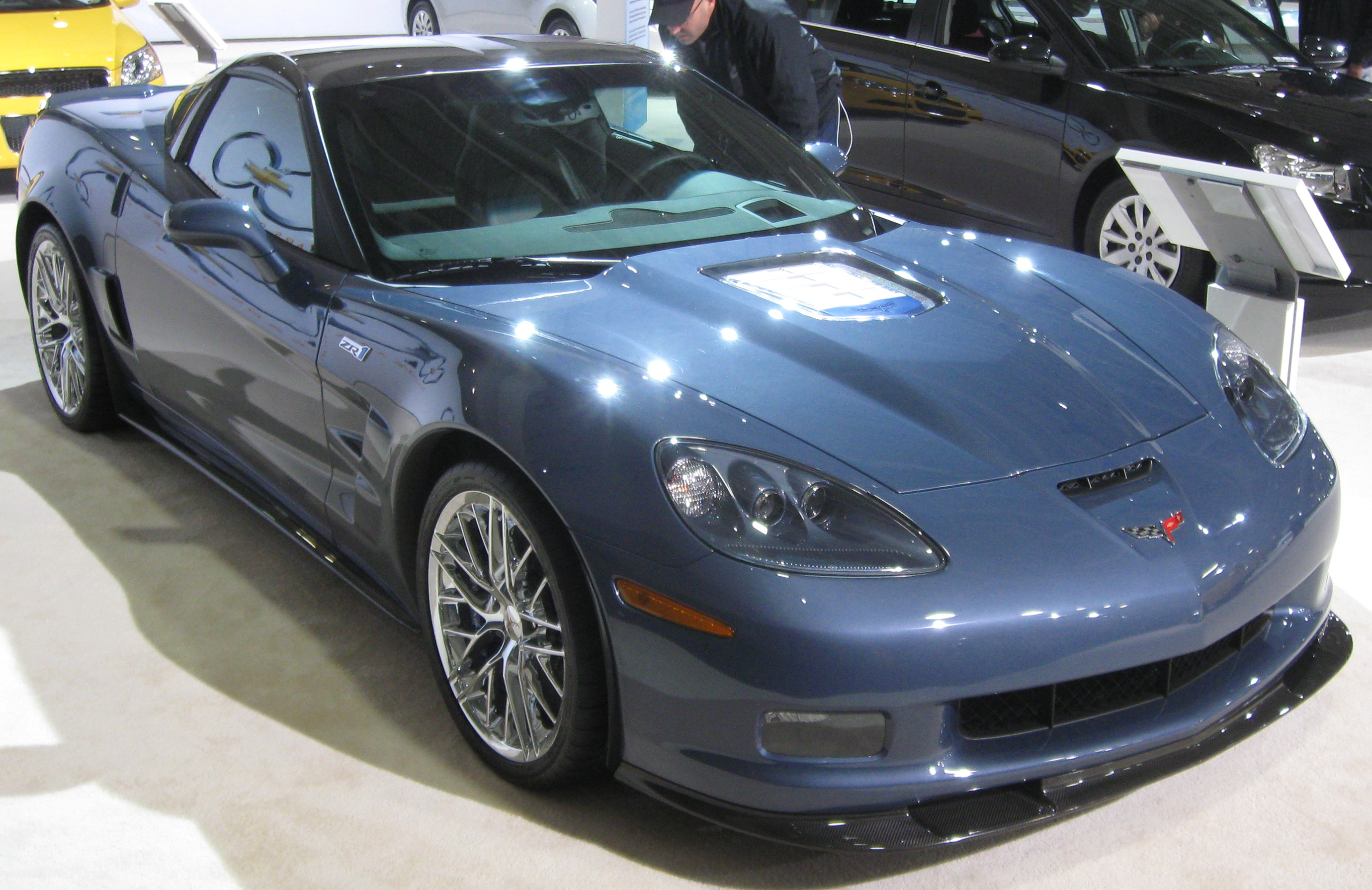
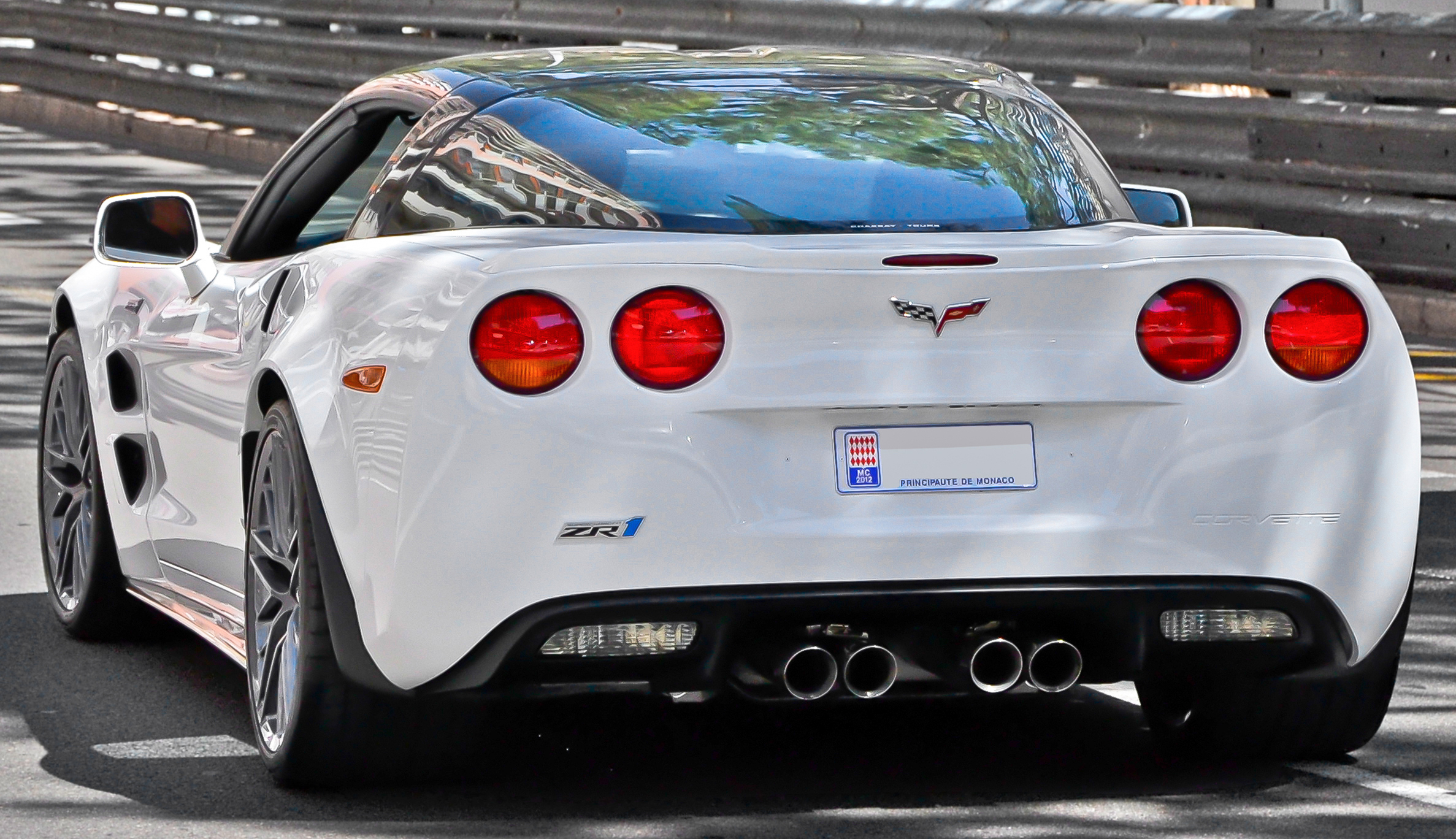
Corvette ZR1 (below EU spec)

The ZR1 is the high performance variant of the Z06 and was first reported by several print and online publications, based on rumors that General Motors was developing a production version of the Corvette above the Z06 level under the internal code name Blue Devil (named after CEO Rick Wagoner's alma mater, Duke University). The car was originally rumored to feature a supercharged LS9 engine having a power output of more than 630 hp (639 PS; 470 kW).

The October 12, 2006 issue of AutoWeek published photos by photographer Chris Doane of a C6 Z06 with special auto-manufacturer-issued license plates with a hood bulge, widely thought to confirm the presence of a supercharger on the Blue Devil. Other names attached to the project included Corvette SS, after the late '50 racing car, and Corvette Z07. In February 2007, a worker at a Michigan shipping company posted pictures online of a powertrain development mule that was being shipped to Germany, believed to be part of the Blue Devil program. The car had manufacturer's license plates, carbon-ceramic disc brakes, enlarged fender vents, a hood bulge, and an engine with a positive-displacement supercharger in the valley between the cylinder banks and a water-to-air intercooler atop it. GM began to release details on the Blue Devil project in April 2007. The company confirmed the existence of the project in an interview with Car and Driver on April 13. Engine power levels were confirmed to be between 600 and 700 horsepower (447 and 522 kW), but contrary to prior rumors of a supercharged 6.2-liter engine, the engine was only confirmed to have greater displacement than the 7.0-liter LS7 in the Z06. Motor Trend confirmed the official name for the production version of the Blue Devil, resurrecting the old ZR1 nameplate. The ZR1 had originally been used on developmental cars in 1971, and again as ZR-1 as the top of the line variant of the C4 Corvette. General Motors officially introduced the Corvette ZR1 on December 19, giving a press release and photographs of the car. GM confirmed a supercharged 6.2 L LS9 V8 having a power output of 638 hp (647 PS; 476 kW) at 6,500 rpm and 604 lb⋅ft (819 N⋅m) of torque at 3,800 rpm. Motor Trend tested the ZR1 in October 2008 and achieved a 0-60 mph (0-97 km/h) time of 3.3 seconds and a quarter-mile time of 11.2 seconds at 130.5 mph (210 km/h). At the time of testing, the ZR1 was faster in the quarter-mile than almost every other car Motor Trend had ever tested. Notable cars that were faster than the ZR1 included the Ferrari Enzo, Bugatti Veyron, and the Saleen S7 Twin Turbo. The ZR1 is engineered to reach speeds up to 205 mph (330 km/h).

Carbon fiber is used on the roof, hood, fenders, front splitter, and rocker moldings; the hood and fenders are painted over, while the roof and splitter are merely covered in a clear-coat, retaining their original black color. A polycarbonate window is placed in the center of the hood, allowing the engine intercooler to be seen from the exterior. The wheels were the largest ever placed on a production Corvette, with both front and rear wheels increasing in size and diameter over the Z06. Carbon-ceramic brakes are included. The brake calipers are painted blue, as are the engine intercooler trim and the ZR1 logo. Magnetic Selective Ride Control was also included on the car, with sensors to automatically adjust stiffness levels based on road conditions and vehicle movement.

=== Grand Sport ===
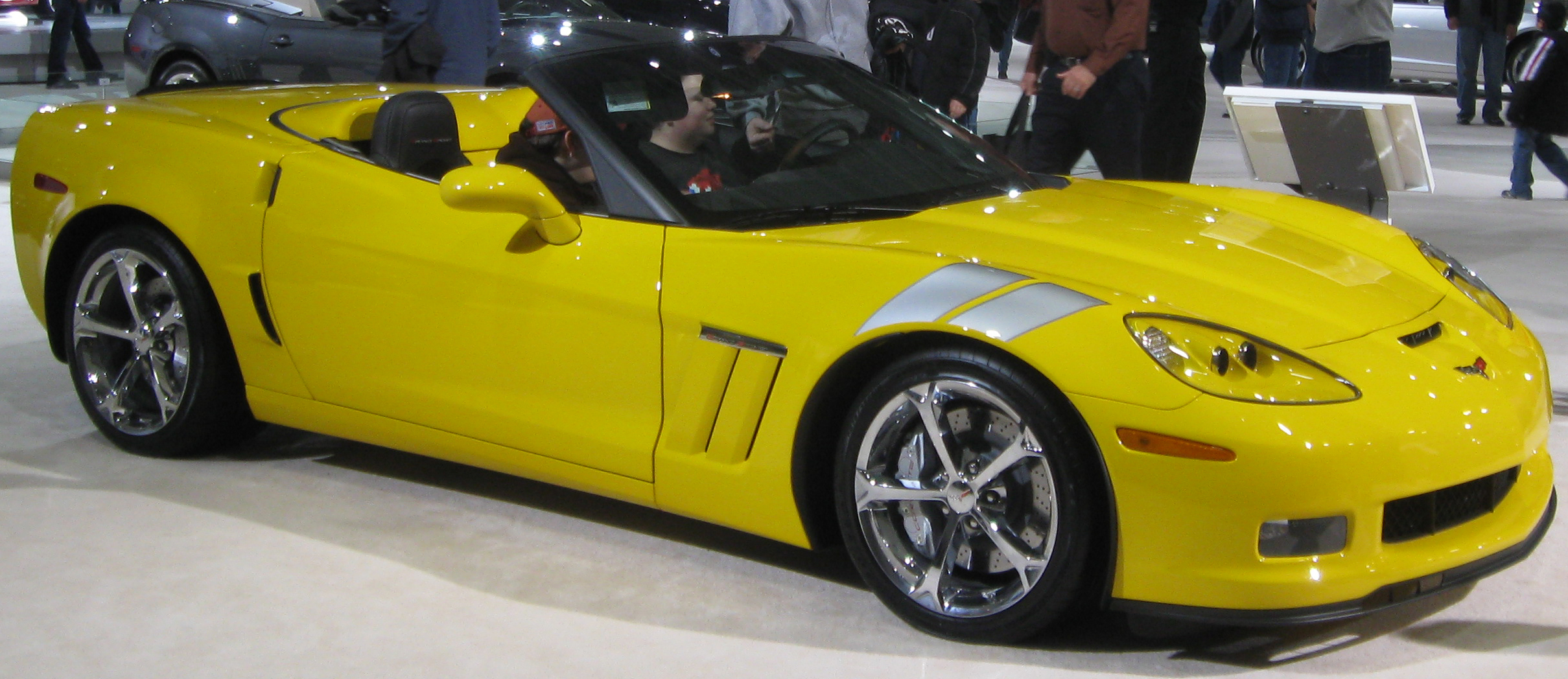
Corvette Grand Sport Convertible

The 2010 Grand Sport was unveiled at the 12th annual C5/C6 Corvette Birthday Bash, held at the National Corvette Museum. Featuring a standard steel frame, the version received unique front fenders with "gill", and a front bumper and rear fenders from the Z06. The Grand Sport replaces the previous Z51 option. The GS or Grand Sport was equipped with the following enhancements:

- Specific manual transmission with different gear ratios
- Larger/stiffer anti-sway bars
- Stiffer springs
- Revised shocks
- Larger Z06 rear spoiler
- Transmission cooler
- Functional front and rear brake ducts for added brake system cooling
- Unique light weight forged aluminum 18-inch front and 19-inch rear wheels (painted finish standard and chromed finish optional)
- Z06 brakes, including cross-drilled 355 mm (14.0 in) front rotors and 340 mm (13 in) rear rotors
- Specific rear axle ratio on automatic transmission equipped models
- Optional 1LT, 2LT, 3LT and 4LT trim packages.
- Wider front and rear fenders with integrated Grand Sport badges
- Wider 275/35ZR18 tires in the front
- Wider 325/30ZR19 tires in the rear
- 6-piston front calipers and 4-piston rear calipers
- Dry-sump oil system (manual transmission coupes only)
- Hand-built LS3 6.2 L V8 (manual transmission coupes only)
- launch control (manual only)

=== 427 Convertible ===
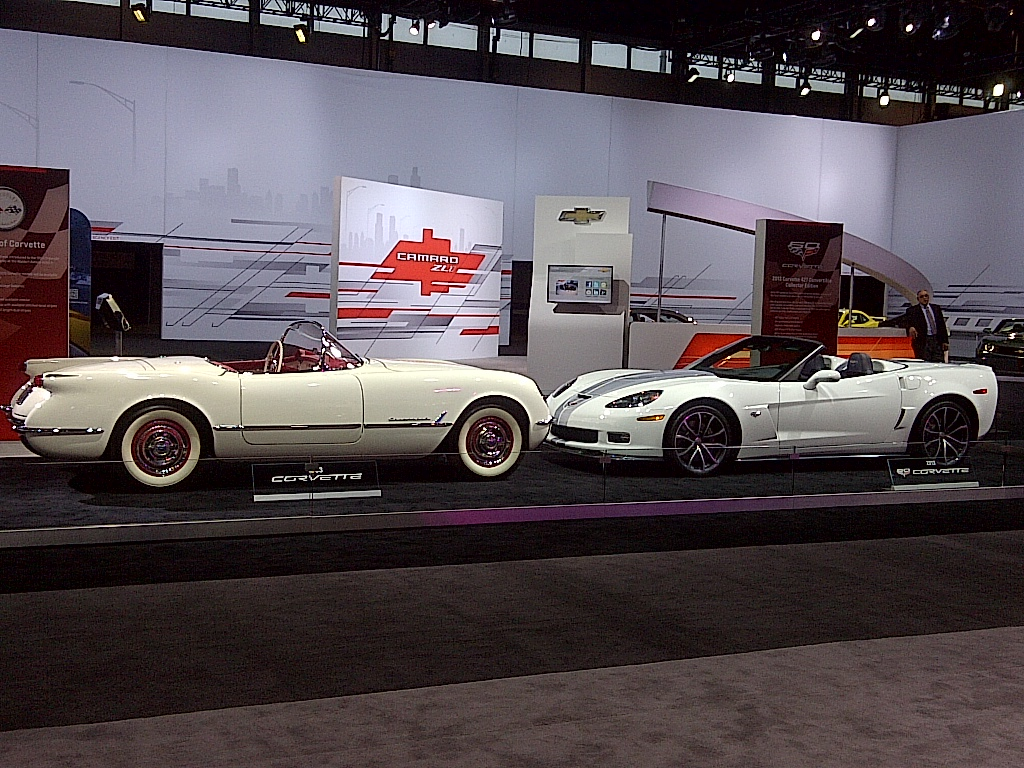
C1 and Corvette 427 Convertible

The 427 was introduced in early 2012 and became the fastest C6 convertible yet. It pays homage to the older 427 engines, although it actually has the displacement of the 428. The Z06 engine is mounted in a standard steel convertible frame. The manual transmission, steering and brakes were also borrowed from the Z06. The body featured elements from the Z06 and ZR1, including a bumper and fenders, but a bulging hood without a window. The last copy went to the museum, only 2,552 copies were produced.

== Engines ==
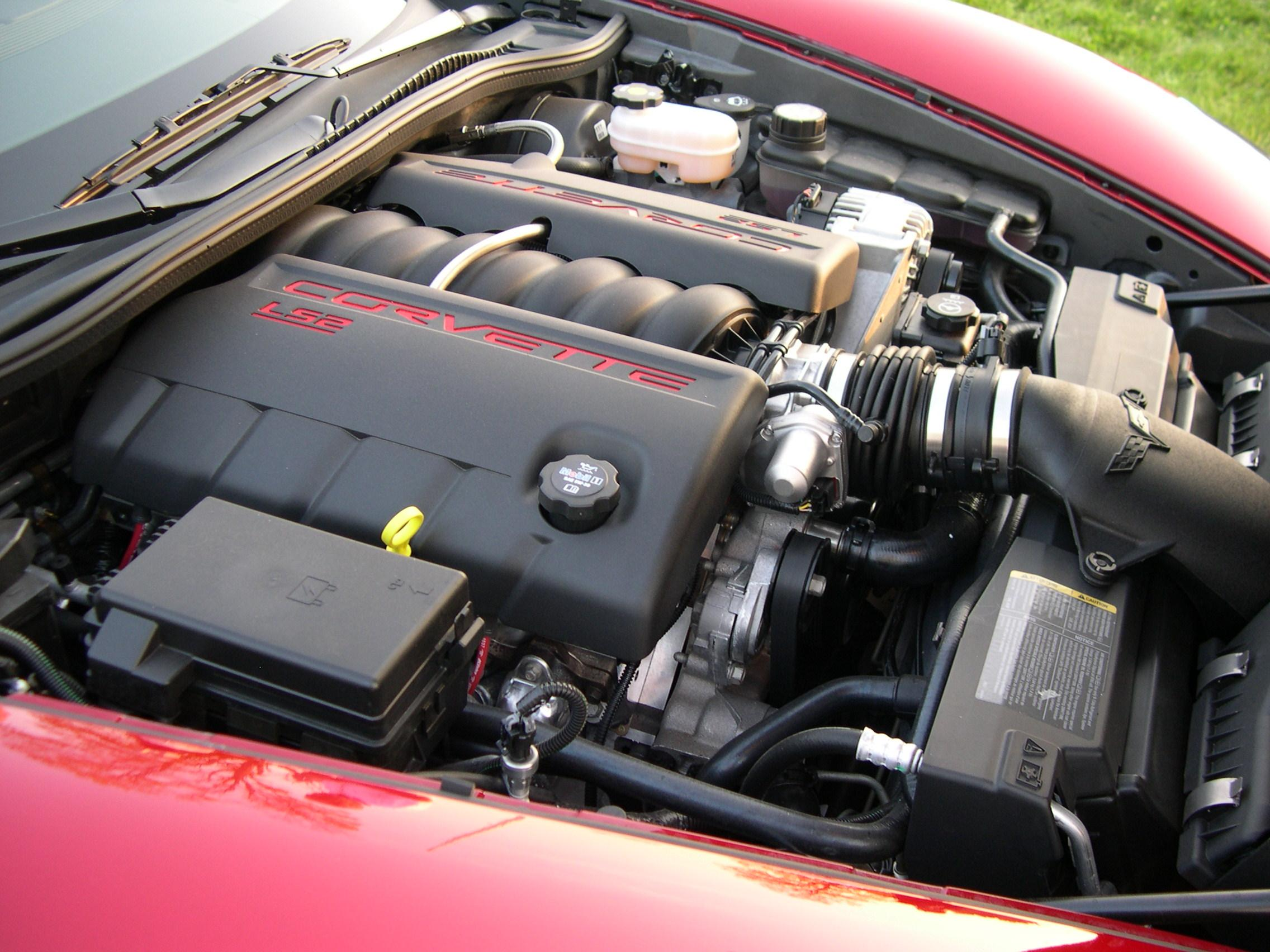
The LS2 V8 engine

Type	Years
LS2	2005–2007
LS3	2008–2013
LS7	2006–2013
LS9	2009–2013

The LS2 was replaced by LS3 from model years 2008–2013.

The LS3 engine in the GS convertible or Grand Sport coupe equipped with an automatic transmission has wet sump instead of dry sump lubrication.

== Limited editions ==
=== Ron Fellows ALMS GT1 Championship Edition (2007) ===
The Ron Fellows ALMS GT1 Championship Edition is a special edition of the Corvette Z06 developed to commemorate the victory of the Corvette racing team driver Ron Fellows at the 2007 ALMS GT1 championship. Notable exterior features include special Arctic White paint, red grand sport style stripes on the front fenders and red and silver hash styled stripes incorporating a maple leaf similar to the livery present on the winning car. The interior had a red interior and complemented accenting on the seats, console and door panels. The arm rest features Ron Fellows' signature. Only 399 were made, 33 of which went to the Canadian market.

=== ZHZ (2008) ===
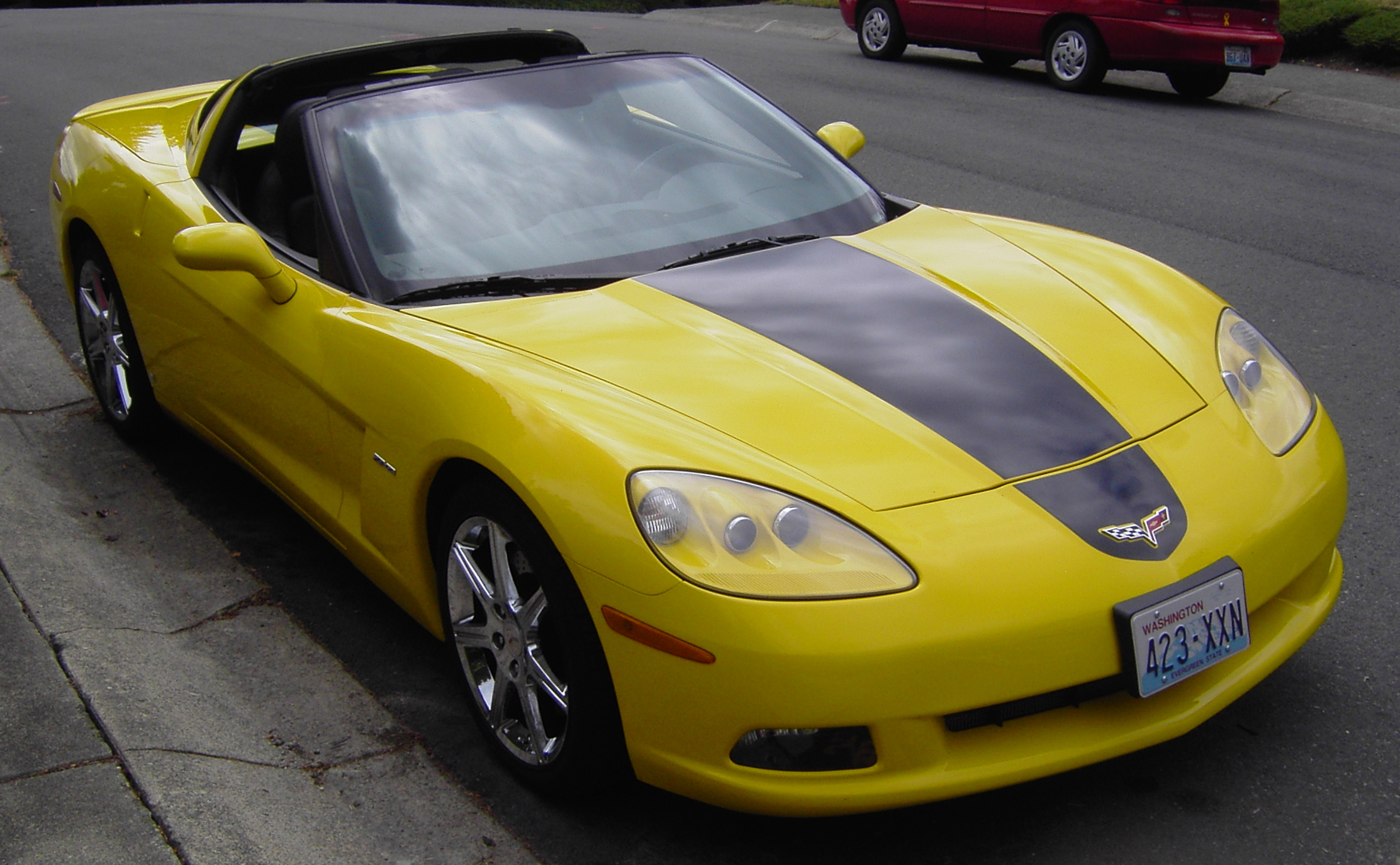
Chevrolet Corvette ZHZ

The ZHZ was a standard Corvette equipped with the LS3 engine, 6-speed automatic transmission, vacuum actuated valve exhaust, F55 suspension and unique 7-spoke chrome wheels. It was developed for The Hertz Corporation's Fun Collection for 2008. 500 targa tops in 2008 and 350 convertibles were produced in 2009 in total. All cars were finished in yellow with a broad black stripe along the hood and roof.

=== GT1 Championship Edition (2009) ===
The GT1 Championship Edition is an optional package for the C6 that was unveiled in the 2009 New York Auto Show. It celebrates the Corvette C6.R's entry into the GT1 class of ALMS in 2009. This limited edition is based on either a 4LT equipped targa top, 4LT convertible or high performance Z06. Models wear the same velocity yellow "45U" body hue that adorns the C6.R or "41U" gloss black, along with a "Jake" graphic that spans the Championship edition's hood. Chrome wheels known as Gumby's are present on the targa top and convertible while the Z06 is fitted with chrome Spyder wheels. A body-colored spoiler shared with the ZR1 joins a "carbon pattern" engine cover, while a leather-wrapped ebony interior contains "GT1" embroidered on the head rests of the seats, the instrument panel and a center console armrest. Non-Z06 models also include a Z51 Performance Package and NPP Performance exhaust.

Original production numbers were slated to be 100 units of each model in each color (600 total), each carrying a premium over the standard models. But actual numbers amounted to 125 units in various numbers for each color code. This was due to the government takeover of General Motors.

=== Z06 Carbon Limited Edition (2011) ===
The Z06 Carbon Limited Edition was available as a 2011 model beginning in the summer of 2010. The car was available in two colors: Inferno Orange and an all-new Supersonic Blue. On the exterior, the car had black headlamps and mirrors, a ZR1-style spoiler, carbon fiber hood (without window), and black carbon fiber rockers and splitter. Inside, the Z06 Carbon has ebony leather and suede seats with body color-matching stitching. Other improvements include Magnetic Selective Ride Control, a special carbon engine cover, 20-spoke black 19-inch front/20-inch rear wheels, and ZR1's carbon ceramic Brembo brakes. Although Chevrolet planned to sell 500 of the Z06 Carbon Limited Edition, only 252 units were produced.

=== Centennial Edition (2012) ===
Order code "ZLC" was an equipment package celebrating 100 years of Chevrolet racing heritage. Offered exclusively in Carbon Flash Metallic, the Centennial Edition kit includes satin-black graphics and unique lightweight cast-spun aluminum Centennial Satin Black wheels that feature a thin red perimeter outline (on Z06 and ZR1 cars). All cars came with red brake calipers and featured Magnetic Selective Ride Control.

Inside, the car featured ebony leather upholstery and contrast stitching while the steering wheel and armrests featured microfiber suede accents. The headrests have an embossed Centennial Edition logo and the steering wheel hub carries the same "Louis Chevrolet 100" graphic found on the car's B-pillar and wheel center caps.

== Cadillac XLR ==
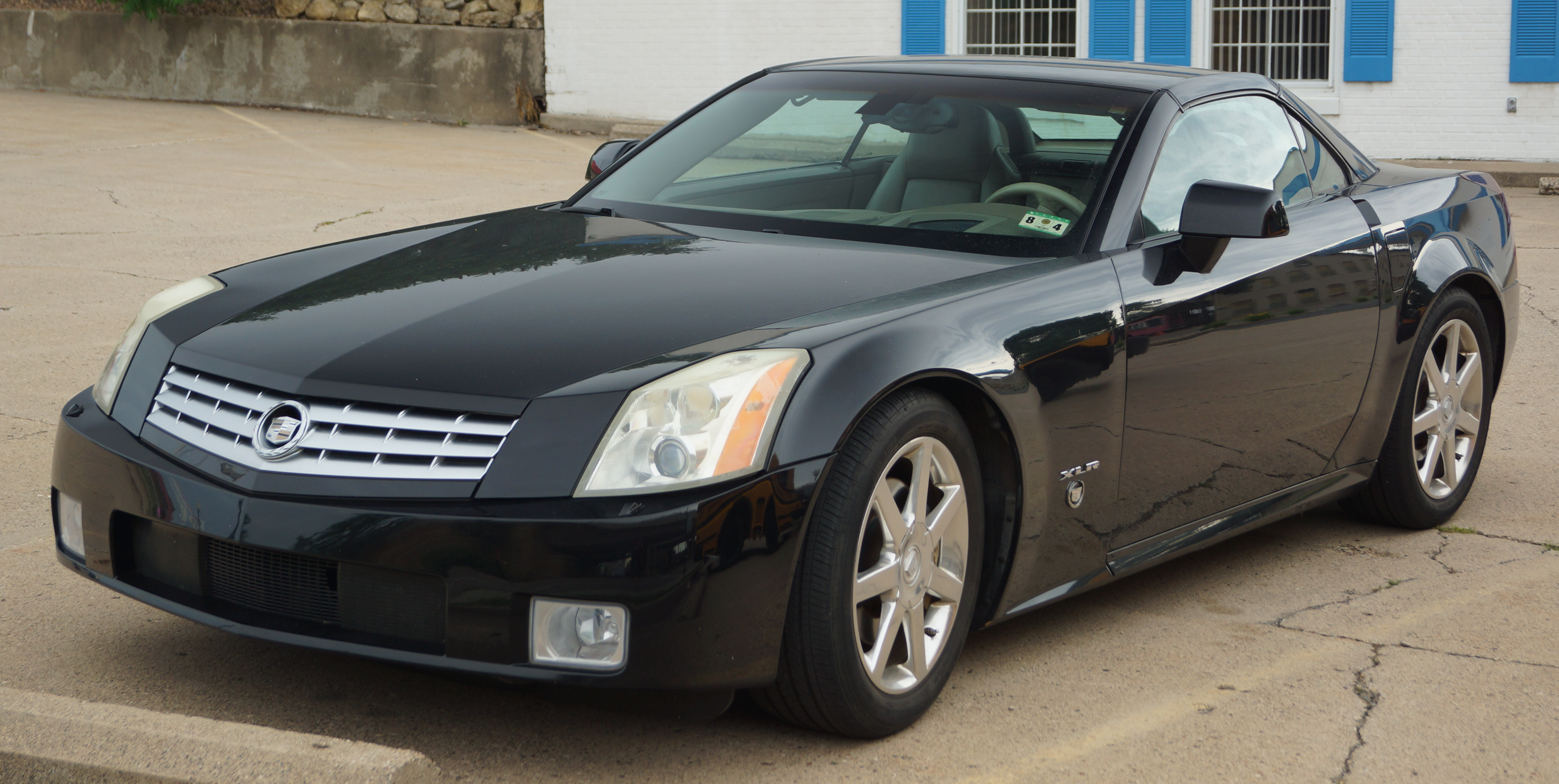
Cadillac XLR

The Cadillac XLR is a luxury roadster that was marketed by Cadillac from 2004 to 2009 model years. Assembled in Bowling Green, Kentucky, the XLR was based on the Chevrolet Corvette's Y platform. Designed to be a grand touring offering, the XLR featured different exterior and interior design, standard adaptive suspension system, a 4.6-liter Cadillac Northstar V8 engine, and a power-retractable aluminum hardtop.

== Production notes ==
Year	Production	Notes
2005	37,372	New C6 body is first with fixed headlights since 1962; no Z06 model and a late convertible introduction
2006	34,021	Differential is redesigned; Z06 debuts; 6-speed automatic with paddle shift available on non-Z06 models
2007	40,561	6-speed automatic paddle shift delays are reduced compared to 2006; larger glovebox
2008	35,310	LS3 introduced, Tremec TR6060 transmission, new steering system, NPP exhaust, improved interior on all models, All leather interior added (4LT, 3LZ)
2009	16,956	ZR1 model added, new "Spyder" wheels for Z06
2010	12,194	Grand Sport Coupe and Convertible added, launch control standard with manual transmission
2011	13,696	Z06 Carbon limited edition; Z07 performance package added for Z06; new 5-spoke wheels for base models
2012	11,647	New seat design and steering wheel; Chevrolet Centennial Edition package offered
2013	13,466	427 Convertible collector edition added in final year for C6; 60th Anniversary design package offered
All	215,223	

== Concept cars ==
=== Z06X ===
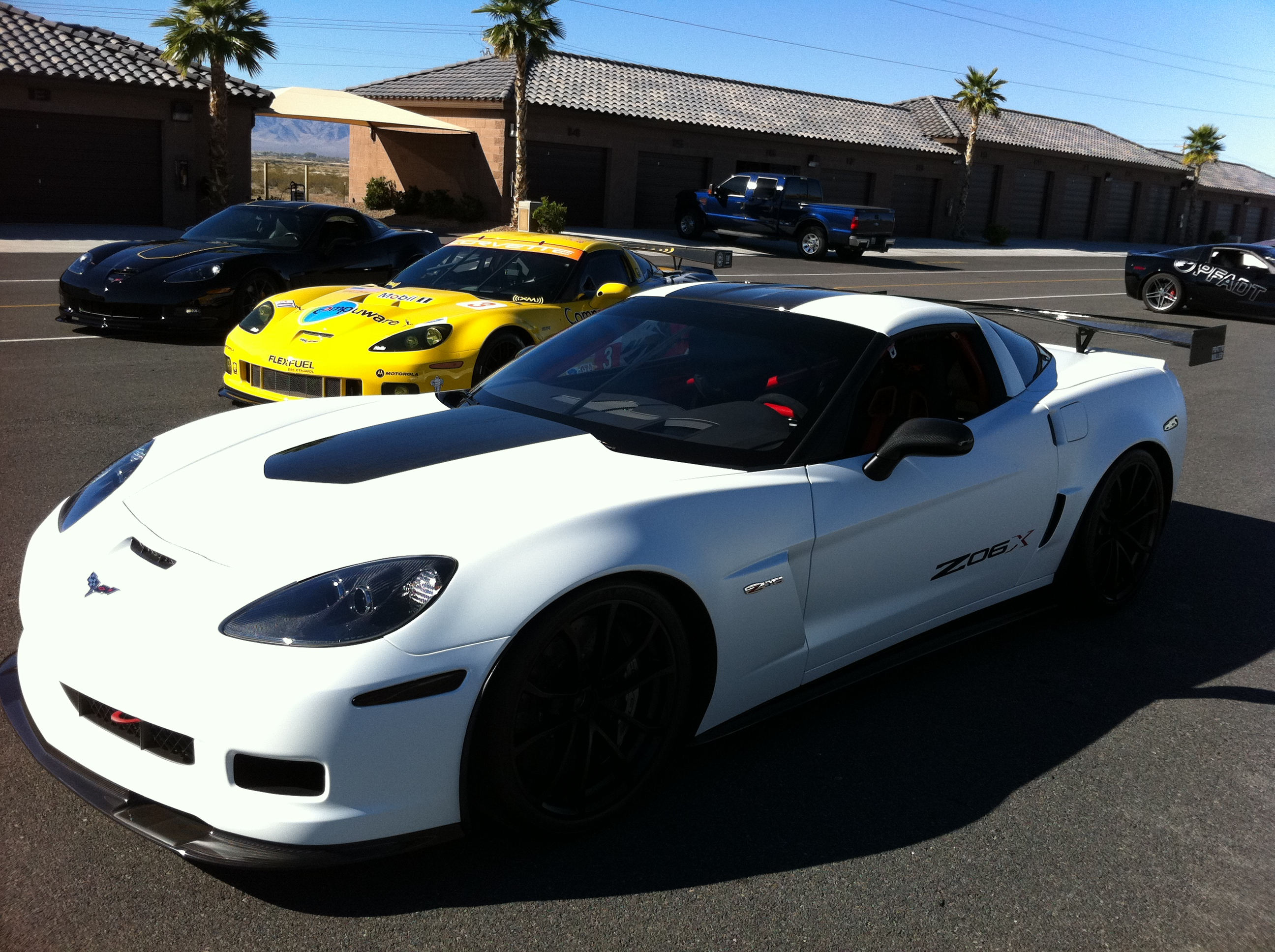
2010 Chevrolet Corvette Z06X

The Z06X was designed to be a factory built road race car similar to cars like the Porsche 911 GT3 Cup and Dodge Viper ACR-X. The concept car was built by GM with the help of Pratt & Miller Engineering. The Z06X, introduced in 2010, featured racecar components such as: carbon fiber adjustable rear wing, carbon fiber front splitter, full roll cage, fire suppression system, race seat, harness, carbon ceramic brakes, upgraded cooling system, polycarbonate rear window, adjustable coilovers, adjustable sway bars, and tow hooks; the radio, interior carpeting and sound-deadening materials have been removed. The suspension system was designed and supplied by Pfadt Race Engineering.

== Racing ==
=== C6.R ===
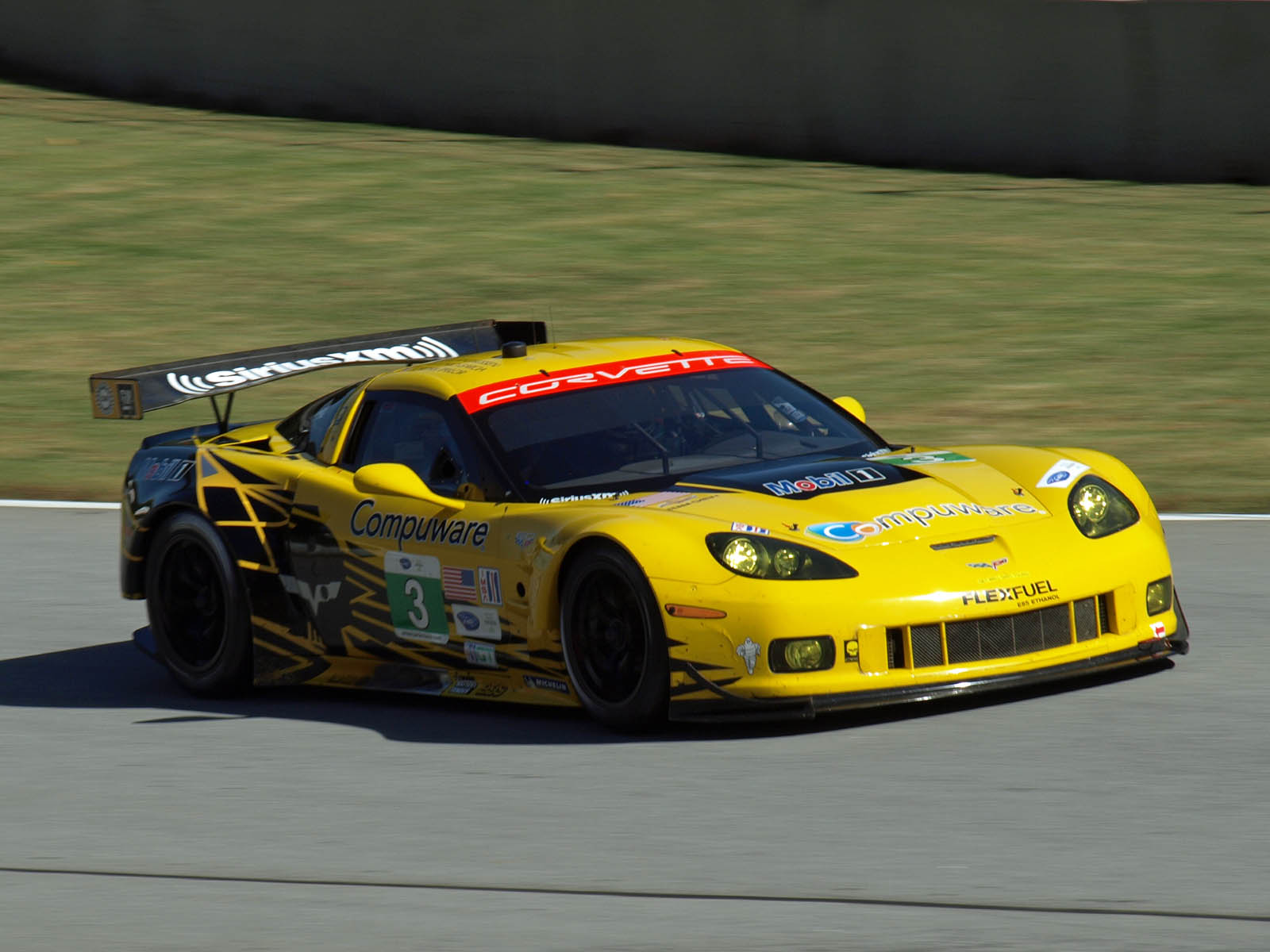
Corvette C6.R

The C6.R was a replacement for the C5-R, built by Pratt & Miller, and unveiled for its first competition at the 2005 12 Hours of Sebring endurance race of the American Le Mans Series. It came in second and third in its class, just behind the new Aston Martin DBR9 race car. It was put on display a week later at the New York International Auto Show next to the Z06.

In 2006, the Corvette C6.R won both American Le Mans GT1 Championships: Teams and Manufacturers. On March 17, 2007 it won the GT1 class in the 12 Hours of Sebring.

For Le Mans 2007, four C6.R's were on the entry list, the two Corvette Racing entries joined by single entries from the Luc Alphand Aventures and PSI-Motorsport teams.

The heart of the C6.R, its LS7.R motor, was crowned as Global Motorsport Engine of the Year by a jury of 50 race engine engineers on the Professional Motorsport World Expo 2006 in Cologne, Germany.

As the GT1 class dwindled, Corvette Racing switched to the GT2 class during the 2009 ALMS season.

For 2011, the aerodynamics of the ALMS cars were modified to be similar to the ZR1. This car has since won the 2011 24 Hours of Le Mans in the GTE-Pro and GTE-Am classes. In 2012, the Corvette C6.R won again in the GTE-Am category.

In addition to the American Le Mans Series, Corvette C6.Rs also race in the FIA GT1 World Championship. The GT1 cars are given more power and have less aerodynamics restrictions than the Le Mans cars, which follow GT2 regulations.

=== Riley GT ===
Riley Technologies built a GT2-class Chevrolet Corvette for the 2008 American Le Mans Series. The car also raced at the 2009 Petit Le Mans, where it beat both Pratt & Miller-built factory cars in qualifying.

=== Z06-R ===
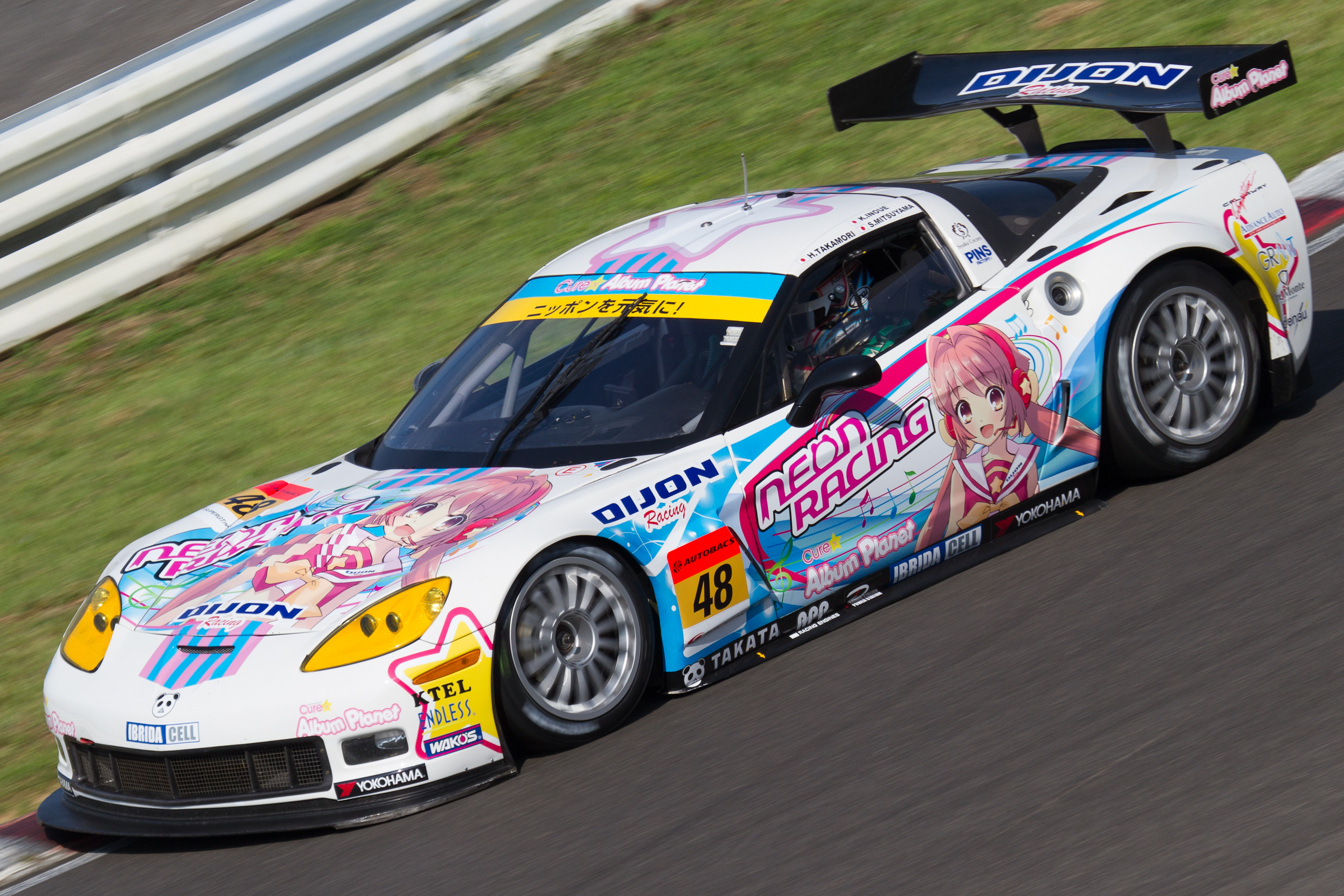
Corvette Z06-R GT3

Entered in the FIA GT3 European Championship series as a GT3 class car, the Z06-R is a modified production Z06. Changes were necessary to make the car endurance race ready. These include a stripped interior, full rollcage for safety, center-locking wheels, carbon fiber doors, rear deck spoiler and front splitter. The LS7 and LS3-engine and drivetrain are built by APP Racing Engines from the Netherlands. The car is not road legal.

Eight Z06-R were constructed by Callaway Competition GmbH in Leingarten, Germany, for the 2006 season. The French team Riverside campaigned a three car team. In an effort to achieve parity among the disparate participants of the GT3 Series, three forms of handicapping were applied by the FIA regulators: additional vehicle weight, ride height, and tire compound selection. The Corvettes were raced with all three handicaps employed. The Z06-R won the FIA GT3 European Championship in its second year of entry. By 2011, all Z06-R teams discontinued their racing efforts in GT3, ending the car's FIA career. Z06-Rs are also campaigned in national championships.

== See also ==
- List of Nürburgring Nordschleife lap times
