= Fifth generation =

Fifth generation or Fifth Generation may refer to:

== Technology ==
- 5G, the fifth generation of cellular wireless standards
- Fifth generation computer, a Japanese computing initiative begun in 1982
- Fifth-generation programming language, a constraint-based programming language
- History of video game consoles (fifth generation) (1993-2002)
- Fifth generation or Video iPod, a version of the iPod Classic
- Fifth Generation Systems, a security and utility software manufacturer for PCs and Macs founded in 1984

== Transportation ==
- Fifth generation jet fighter (2005–present)
- Fifth-generation Chevrolet Camaro (2009–present)
- Fifth-generation Ford Mustang (2005–present)
- Ford Taurus (fifth generation) (2007-2009)
- Honda Civic (fifth generation) (1992-1995)

== Other uses ==
- 5th Generation (religious association), a Brazilian Christian association founded in 2014 by Gabriel Gomes
- Fifth generation of Chinese leadership, current leaders of China
- Fifth Generation, a 1980s-1990s collective of filmmakers in the cinema of China
- Gen V, American superhero television series
- In Pokémon, see List of generation V Pokémon

== See also ==
- Generation (disambiguation)
- 5G (disambiguation)
