= 5th Generation (religious association) =

- Classification: Protestant
- Orientation: Pentecostal
- Leader: Gabriel Gomes
- Region: Brazil
- Founder: Gabriel Gomes
- Origin: April 16, 2014; Brazil
- Members: 75

5th Generation is an association Protestant founded by Brazilians young Christians. The group was founded on April 16, 2014, by Gabriel Gomes during the International Congress of Worship and Intercession Diante do Trono held in Belo Horizonte. The motto is "Generation that loves the Lord."

== History ==
The association founded by Gabriel Gomes, who is the current leader was founded in April 2014, inspired by the word of the Apostle Valnice Milhomens, who preached about the "Fifth Generation" and the restoration of Brazil, during the great annual conference of the Brazilian band Diante do Trono. The association is made up of young Christians and admirers of the band.

The 5th Generation started with few members, but grew quickly. In May 2014 the group held vigils of prayer and intercession for the recording of the album Tetelestai in Israel, it occurred throughout the month. In the same year during the World Cup in Brazil and the elections in Brazil, the group interceded again, since the first cult held by the 5th Generation took place on September 16, 2014. In April 2015, the association has created a caravan in partnership with Besim Viagens company for the International Congress.

== See also ==
- Diante do Trono
- Ana Paula Valadão
- Lagoinha Church
- Valnice Milhomens
- Gateway Worship
