= 5G (disambiguation) =

5G is the fifth generation cellular network technology.

It usually refers to 5G NR and some other Internet of Things network, but some carriers have also applied the 5G label on their LTE Advanced network, which is a fourth generation cellular network technology.

5G may also refer to:

== Other network technology ==
5G, 5G network, or 5G Wi-Fi labeling on network or telecommunication devices can also mean either of followings:

- 5 GHz, a radio frequency used by Wi-Fi among others; see List of WLAN channels.
- Wi-Fi 5 (IEEE 802.11ac), the fifth generation of Wi-Fi technology, from year 2013
- 5 Giga of any other units, for example 5 Gigabytes
- 5th generation of any other technologies/services/goods

== Arts and entertainment ==
- "5G" (Mad Men), an episode of the television series Mad Men
- 5GFM, a radio station
- The Creature from the Pit (production code: 5G), a 1979 Doctor Who serial
- A song from Bill Bruford's second solo album, One of a Kind

== Other uses ==
- iPod (5G)
- Mercedes-Benz 5G-Tronic transmission, an automotive transmission

== See also ==
- Fifth-generation programming language (5GL)
- G5 (disambiguation)
- Fifth generation (disambiguation)
