= Valnice Milhomens =

Brazilian pastor (born 1947)

- Born: 16 July 1947 (age 78); Carolina, Maranhão, Brazil
- Occupation(s): Pastor, apostle, author and televangelist

Valnice Milhomens Coelho (born 16 July 1947) is a Brazilian pastor, apostle, author, and televangelist, founder and president of Ministério Palavra da Fé and the Igreja Nacional do Senhor Jesus Cristo (INSEJEC), currently based in Brasília.

== Biography ==
Valnice converted to Protestantism when she was 15 years old. She attended the Seminary of Christian Educators, in Recife, receiving a bachelor's degree in Social Work and Religious Education.

In January 1971, she was sent as the first missionary of the Brazilian Baptist Convention to Africa, where she spent 13 years as a missionary in Mozambique and two years in South Africa. She returned to Brazil in 1986 claiming to have a specific command of God: I have a ministry for you in Brazil. Train me an army! On 5 December 1987, she founded in Recife city, the Ministério Palavra da Fé (Ministry Word of Faith), an interdenominational organization chaired by her.

Coelho was the first woman evangelical leader to use television as an instrument of evangelization. In 1989, after a series of seminars held in São Paulo, a pastor and businessman made his proposal to put the filming of seminars on TV for three months. Coelho first appeared on television on 24 June 1989, with the program A Palavra da Fé.

She was ordained as a pastor on 30 April 1993, by a group of pastors. She traveled to Bogota, Colombia in 1999, where she met the Pastor César Castellanos and adopted the cellular model in the Government of 12. In June 1999 she brought the couple César and Claudia Castellanos to Brazil, for the Avivamento Celular – Desafios para o Século XXI convention where more than 3,500 pastors of various denominations and all parts of the country, heard and many have adopted the Mobile Vision. At the time, pastor César anointed Coelho as part of its international team of 12.

On 5 August 2001 she was anointed "apostle" by Dr. Rony Chaves, apostle and prophet of Costa Rica, at a conference held in São Paulo, in the Comunhão Cristã – Igreja Apostólica.

On 6 November 2009 she received the title of Honorary Citizen of Brasília, in a formal ceremony by the Legislative Chamber of the Federal District, held in the Temple Headquarters INSEJEC in Vicente Pires, Brasília.

Coelho is the author of several books, as Personalidades Restauradas. It is single, as he opted to celibacy. She currently resides in Brasília. She acted in Elections 2010 and 2014, supporting the presidential candidate Marina Silva.

In July 2013, Coelho, along with several pastors and evangelical leaders met with President Dilma Rousseff in Brasília.

In May 2014, she participated in the caravan of Christian band Diante do Trono, that occurred in the city of Jerusalem in Israel, where they recorded their seventeenth band album, entitled Tetelestai.

She is also known for her prophecies. In one of them she said Jesus would come back in 2007.

== INSEJEC ==
The INSEJEC has worked in Mozambique, Angola, Portugal, Switzerland, Spain, Germany, France, Middle East, and Japan.

== Publications ==
Coelho has written a number of books including;

- In 1993, published the "Comunhão e Princípios de Fé (Escola de Oração Livro 1)" ISBN 85-87477-43-9, by publisher Palavra da Fé Produções.
- In 1993, published the "Tipos de Oração (Escola de Oração Livro 2)" ISBN 85-87477-43-9, by publisher Palavra da Fé Produções.
- In 1993, published the "Orando A Palavra (Escola de Oração Livro 3)" ISBN 978-85-8747-744-6, by publisher Palavra de Fé.
- In 1993, published the "O Poder da Intercessão (Escola de Oração Livro 4)" ISBN 978-85-8747-737-8, by publisher Palavra da Fé Produções.
- In 1995, published the "O Poder da Intercessão (Escola de Oração Livro 5)" ISBN 978-85-8747-748-4, by publisher Palavra da Fé Produções.
- Personalidades Restauradas
- Adoracao em Santidade X Idolatria e Feiticaria
- Anointing and Identity Crisis
