= Chevrolet Camaro (fifth generation) =

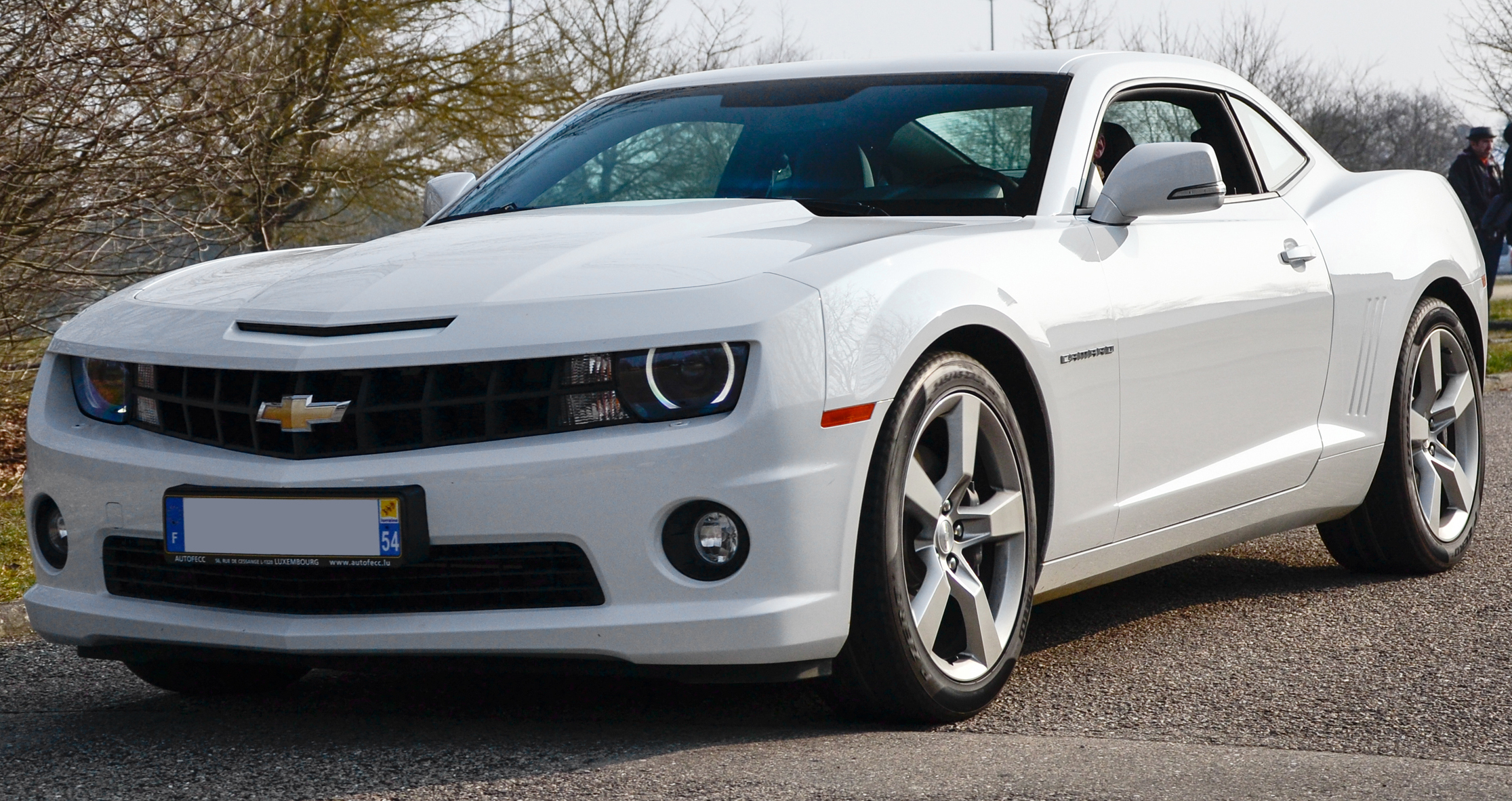
- Chevrolet Camaro SS (pre-facelift)

Overview
- Manufacturer: Chevrolet (General Motors)
- Production: March 2009 – November 2015
- Model years: 2010–2015
- Assembly: Canada: Oshawa, Ontario (Oshawa Car Assembly)
- Designer: SangYup Lee (2005); Tom Peters (2007)

Body and chassis
- Class: Pony car; Muscle car
- Body style: 2-door coupé; 2-door convertible
- Layout: Front-engine, rear-wheel drive
- Platform: GM Zeta platform GMX521 (coupe); GMX511 (convertible)
- Related: Buick Park Avenue; Chevrolet Caprice; Chevrolet Lumina; Chevrolet SS; Holden Commodore (VE); Holden Commodore (VF); Holden WM/WN Caprice; Pontiac G8; Holden Coupe 60

Powertrain
- Engine: 3.6 L LLT V6 (2010–2011); 3.6 L LFX V6 (2012–2015); 5.3 L LSX V8 Supercharged V8 (COPO Camaro); 5.3 L LSX V8 Whipple supercharged V8 (COPO Camaro); 6.2 L LS3 V8 (Manual SS models only); 6.2 L L99 V8 (Automatic SS only); 6.2 L LSA supercharged V8 (ZL1); 7.0 L LS7 V8 (Z/28)
- Transmission: 6-speed 6L50 automatic; 6-speed 6L80 automatic; 6-speed 6L90 automatic; 6-speed Aisin AY6 manual; 6-speed Tremec TR-6060 manual

Dimensions
- Wheelbase: 112.3 in (2,852 mm)
- Length: 190.4 in (4,840 mm)
- Width: 75.5 in (1,920 mm)
- Height: 54.2 in (1,380 mm)
- Curb weight: 3,750 lb (1,700 kg)

Chronology
- Predecessor: Chevrolet Camaro (fourth generation)
- Successor: Chevrolet Camaro (sixth generation)

The fifth-generation Chevrolet Camaro is a pony car that was manufactured by American automobile manufacturer Chevrolet from 2010 to 2015 model years. It is the fifth distinct generation of the muscle/pony car to be produced since its original introduction in 1967. Production of the fifth generation model began on March 16, 2009, after several years on hiatus since the previous generation's production ended in 2002 and went on sale to the public in April 2009 for the 2010 model year. The fifth generation was succeeded by the sixth generation in 2015.

== Development ==
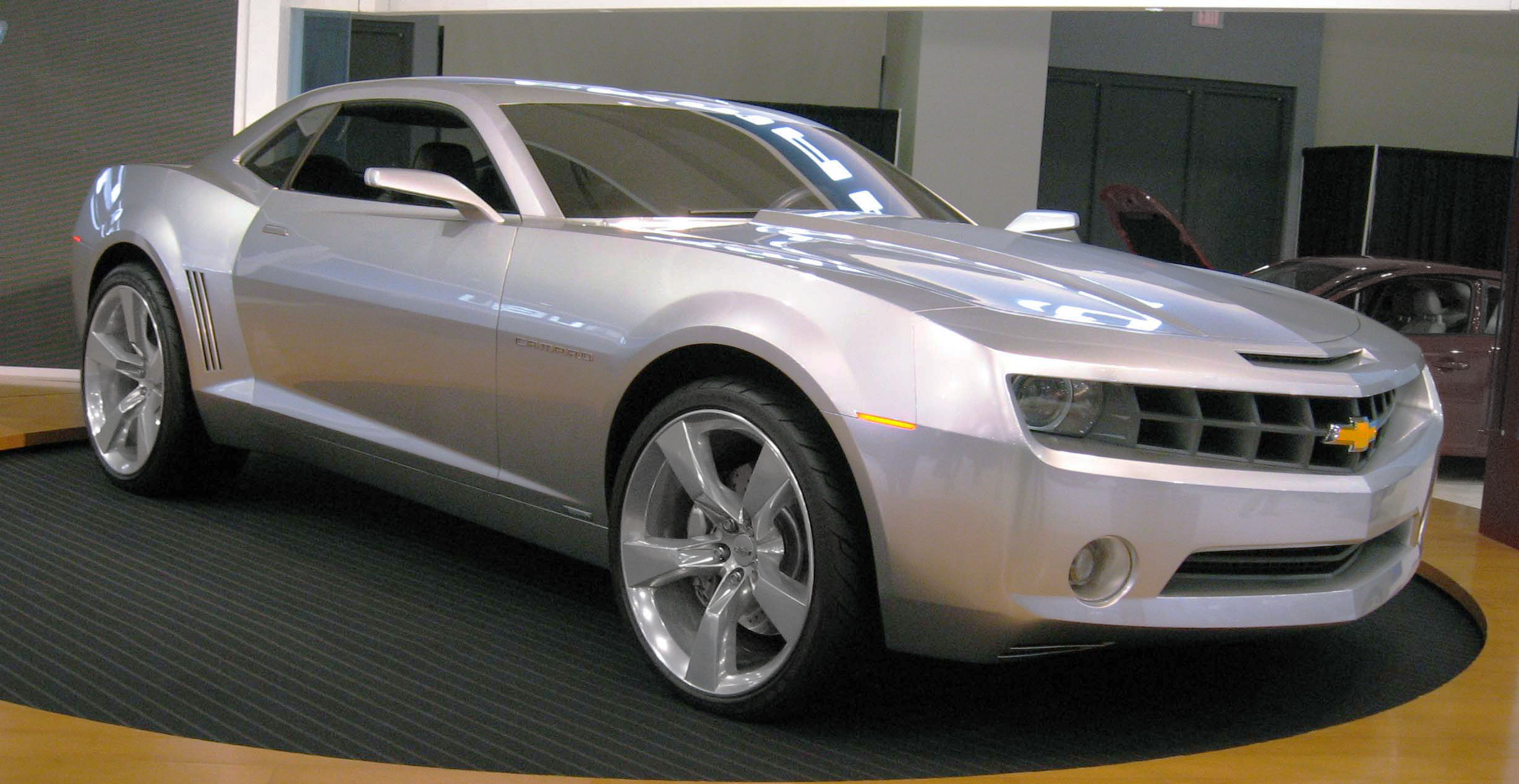
The clay model of the fifth-generation Camaro on display at the 2006 Washington Auto Show

By spring 2005, the first concept car of the fifth-generation Camaro was in development. Several sketches of both the exterior and interior were drawn and were shown months later to the public. Once sketches were finished, the Camaro was constructed as a clay model which was completed by fall 2005 and was shown to the public at the Detroit auto show in January 2006.

Following the development of the Zeta architecture and because of its position as the GM global center of RWD development, GM Holden in Australia led the final design, engineering, and development of the Camaro. Several camouflaged test mules of the Camaro were manufactured by Holden at a cost of about US$250,000 each. These vehicles were used for crash testing, test driving, and handling extreme weather conditions such as in Canada, Arizona, and Australia. By January 2008, Chevrolet announced that the test mules will not be camouflaged and various images of the Camaro were released in the same year, including pre-production models.

Original plans for the car had included sharing the chassis with the Impala, which was to be switched to the Zeta platform. However, a 2007 energy law drastically changing the Corporate Average Fuel Economy forced GM to scuttle plans for replacing the W-Body platform of the Impala. The car was originally scheduled to begin production in 2008 and to go on sale in the first quarter of 2009 for the 2009 model year, but General Motors stated in March 2008 that production would be delayed until February 2009 with the Camaro going on sale in the spring of 2009 for the 2010 model year.

== 2010 model year ==
As evidence that we're not completely brain-dead, GM will build the Chevy Camaro.

— Rick Wagoner, General Motors CEO

The new Camaro was produced at the Oshawa Car Assembly manufacturing plant in Canada. 2,750 jobs would have been lost at the Oshawa manufacturing plant which had been originally scheduled to be closed in 2008; some of these jobs were saved due to the new Camaro's production. This new product program and conversion of the Oshawa plant to a state of the art flexible manufacturing facility represented a US$740,000,000 investment.

The car was unveiled at the Warren Technical Center, followed by GM Holden's Melbourne headquarters, Yokohama Red Brick Park, and Summer Sonic 2010.

US models went on sale in the first quarter of 2009.

Japanese models included the LT and SS, and went on sale on in December 2009.

=== Technical description ===
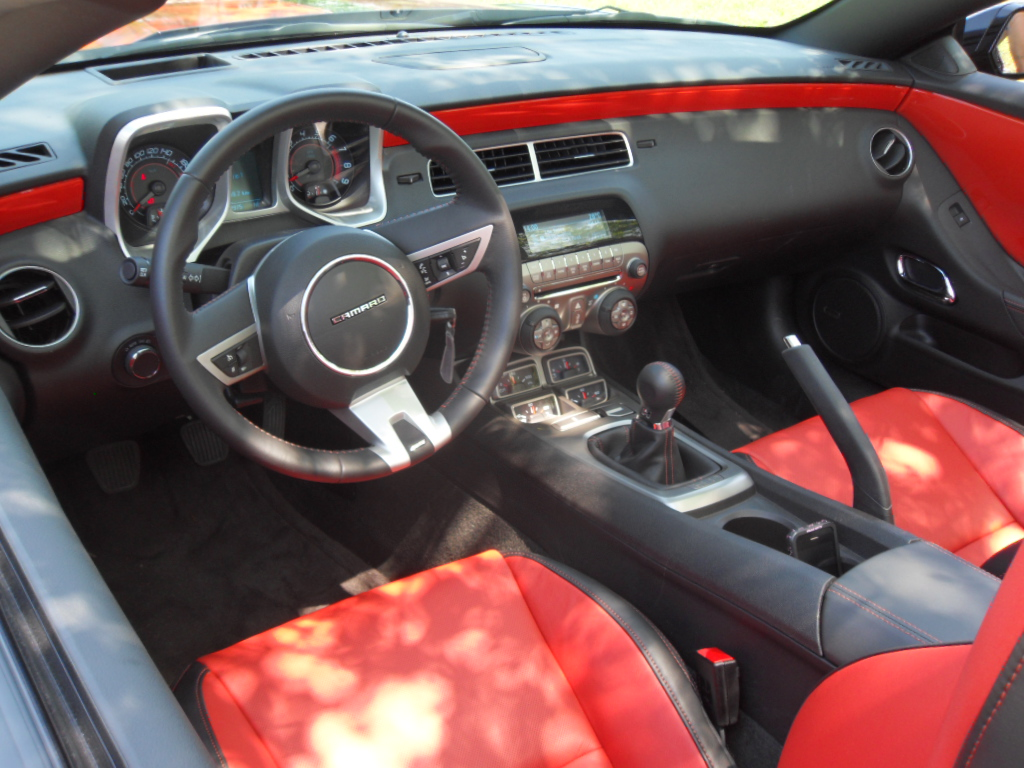
Interior (2010 Camaro with Inferno Orange Metallic interior option and equipped with a factory Hurst Shifter)

Originally, the Camaro was made available as a coupé in five different trim levels; the LS, 1LT, 2LT, 1SS, and 2SS. The LS and LT trim levels are powered by the 3,564 cc (217 cu in) GM LLT V6 engine having a power output of 312 hp (233 kW) at 6,400 rpm and 273 lb⋅ft (370 N⋅m) of torque at 5,200 rpm. The SS with manual transmission is powered by the 6,162 cc (376 cu in) GM LS3 V8 engine rated at 426 hp (318 kW) at 5,900 rpm and 420 lb⋅ft (569 N⋅m) of torque at 4,600 rpm while the SS with automatic transmission is powered by a new variant of the LS3 called the GM L99 which produces 400 hp (298 kW) at 5,900 rpm and 410 lb⋅ft (556 N⋅m) of torque at 4,300 rpm. The L99 V8 engine, not to be confused with the earlier LT-series L99, uses Active Fuel Management which enables the engine to run on only four cylinders during urban driving conditions, such as highway cruising, to improve fuel economy.

Other features include a fully independent suspension system, variable-rate power steering, disc brakes on all wheels standard on all models (four-piston Brembo calipers on SS models), a StabiliTrak electronic stability/traction control system, Competitive/Sport modes for the stability system offered on SS models, launch control on SS models equipped with the six-speed manual transmission, and six standard airbags that include head curtain side-impact airbags and front seat-mounted thorax side airbags. An RS appearance package was available on LT and SS trim levels which included HID headlamps with integrated halo rings, a rear spoiler, and RS-specific taillamps and wheels. Rally and hockey stripe packages were made available in several colors as well.

2010 Chevrolet Camaro Specifications
	LS/LT	SS
Overview
Driveline	Four-passenger, front-engine, rear-drive coupe	
Construction	Unitized body frame, one- and two-sided galvanized steel	
Chassis/Suspension
Front	double-ball-joint, multi-link strut; direct-acting stabilizer bar; progressive-rate coil springs; fully adjustable camber, caster and toe	
Rear	4.5-link independent; progressive-rate coil springs over shocks; stabilizer bar; fully adjustable camber and toe	
Steering type	variable-ratio rack-and-pinion	
Steering ratio	16.1:1	
Turning circle	37.7 ft (1,150 cm)	
Brakes
Type	four-wheel disc w/ABS; ventilated front and rear rotors; single-piston front calipers and single-piston alloy rear calipers	four-wheel disc w/ABS; ventilated front and rear rotors; four-piston fixed Brembo aluminum front and rear calipers
f: 12.64 in (321 mm) r: 12.4 in (310 mm)	f: 14 in (360 mm) r: 14.4 in (370 mm)	
Rotor thickness	f: 1.18 in (30 mm) r: 0.9 in (23 mm)	f: 1.26 in (32 mm) r: 1.1 in (28 mm)
Wheels/Tires
Wheel size and type	18x7.5-inch steel (19x8-inch aluminum optional on LT)	20x8-inch aluminum (front), 20x9-inch aluminum (rear)
Tires	P245/55R18 all-season (P245/50R19 all-season option on LT)	P245/45ZR20 Pirelli PZero summer (front), P275/40ZR20 Pirelli PZero summer (rear)
Engine
Type	GM LLT V6 DI VVT	GM LS3 V8; GM L99 V8
Displacement	3.6 L (3,564 cc or 217 cu in)	6.2 L (6,162 cc or 376 cu in)
Bore and stroke	3.7 in (94 mm) x 3.37 in (86 mm)	4.06 in (103 mm) x 3.62 in (92 mm)
Cylinder head material	aluminum	
Block material	cast aluminum w/ cast-in-place iron bore liners	
Valvetrain	dual overhead camshafts, four valves per cylinder, continuously variable valve timing	valve-in-head: two valves per cylinder; roller lifters; Active Fuel Management (L99)
Fuel delivery	direct high-pressure fuel injection	returnless, multi-port fuel injection
Compression	11.3:1	10.7:1(LS3);10.4:1(L99)
Horsepower	304 hp (227 kW) at 6,400 rpm	426 hp (318 kW) at 6,000 rpm (LS3); 400 hp (300 kW) at 5,900 rpm (L99)
Torque	273 lbf⋅ft (370 N⋅m) at 5,200 rpm	420 lbf⋅ft (570 N⋅m) at 4,600 rpm (LS3); 410 lbf⋅ft (560 N⋅m) at 4,300 rpm (L99)
Recommended fuel	regular unleaded	premium unleaded
Max engine speed	7,000 rpm	6,600 rpm (LS3); 6,000 rpm (L99)
Fuel economy	29 mpg_{‑US} (8.1 L/100 km; 35 mpg_{‑imp}) hwy	25 mpg_{‑US} (9.4 L/100 km; 30 mpg_{‑imp}) hwy
Transmission
Automatic	Hydra-Matic 6L50 6-speed automatic w/ TAPshift	Hydra-Matic 6L80 6-speed automatic w/ TAPshift
Manual	Aisin Warner AY6 6-speed manual	TR6060 6-speed manual
Dimensions
Length	190.4 in (4,840 mm)	
Width	75.5 in (1,920 mm)	
Height	54.2 in (1,380 mm)	
Front track	63.7 in (1,620 mm)	
Rear track	64.1 in (1,630 mm)	63.7 in (1,620 mm)
Curb weight	LS auto: 3,769 lb (1,710 kg); LS man: 3,780 lb (1,710 kg); LT auto: 3,750 lb (1,700 kg); LT man: 3,741 lb (1,697 kg)	SS auto: 3,913 lb (1,775 kg); SS man: 3,860 lb (1,750 kg)
Weight balance	52% front, 48% rear	
Seating capacity	2 front, 2 rear	
Headroom	f: 37.4 in (950 mm), r: 35.3 in (900 mm)	
Legroom	f: 42.4 in (1,080 mm), r: 29.9 in (760 mm)	
Shoulder room	f: 56.9 in (1,450 mm), r: 42.5 in (1,080 mm)	
Cargo volume	11.3 cu ft (0.32 m^{3})	
Fuel tank	19 US gal (72 L)	
Engine oil	7.6 US qt (7.2 L)	8.9 US qt (8.4 L)

=== Transformers Special Edition ===
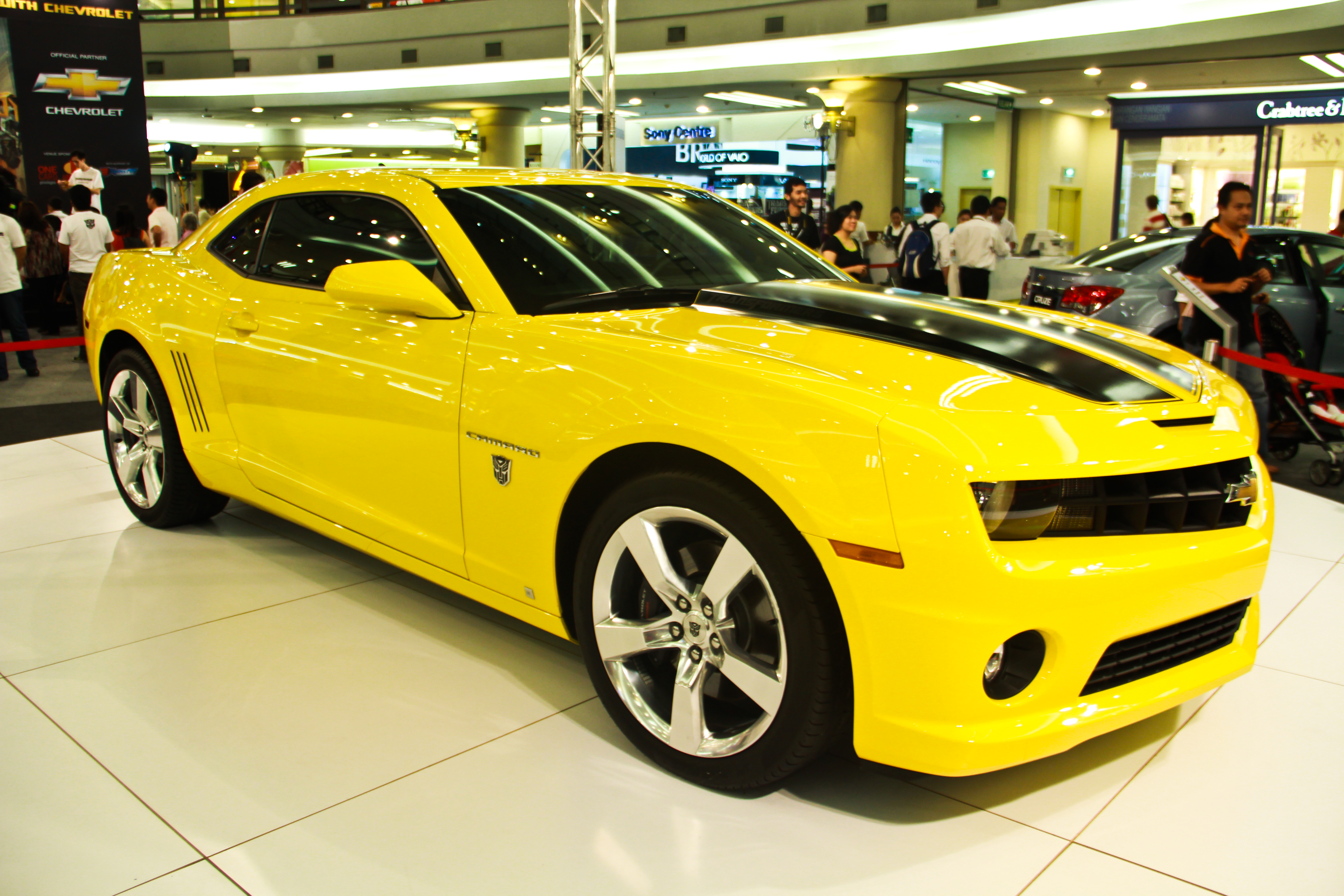
A 2010 Camaro SS with the Transformers Special Edition appearance package

On July 22, 2009, to coincide with the release of Transformers: Revenge of the Fallen, GM announced a Transformers Special Edition appearance package for the 2010 Camaro at the 2009 San Diego Comic-Con. The US$995 appearance package (RPO code: CTH) could be applied to LT and SS trims with or without the optional RS package and could only be applied to orders made in the Rally Yellow exterior scheme. The package included an Autobot shield badge on the driver and passenger side fenders underneath the Camaro nameplate, an Autobot shield on each of the four wheel's center cap, an Autobot shield embroidered on the interior center console, a Transformers logo on the driver and passenger doors' sill plates replacing the original "Camaro" labeled plates, and high-gloss black center rally stripes with the Transformers ghost logo embedded. This then made the 2010 Camaro resemble the Bumblebee Camaro from the 2007 movie, often referred to as T1 Bumblebee. Production of the add-on package ceased on January 12, 2010, with an estimated 1,500 units produced. 1,916 units were finally produced at the end of 2010.

Japanese models of the ten package went on sale on in February 2010.

=== Synergy Special Edition ===
On January 14, 2010, GM announced the production version of the Synergy Concept Camaro originally shown at the 2009 SEMA show. The Synergy Special Edition (RPO code: GHS) for the 2010 model year is based on the Camaro 1LT/2LT model and features the limited Synergy Green exterior color scheme. Though the edition is from the SEMA concept there are certain accessories that did not come on the production unit such as the high wing spoiler, 21 in (530 mm) Black painted wheels and ground effects kit. The production units came accented by Cyber Grey Rally Stripes running the length of the Camaro hood and rear deck. Other exterior features include a standard rear spoiler found on RS and SS packages replacing the high wing and standard 19 in (480 mm) Sterling Silver painted wheels wrapped with P245/50R19 tires, backup radar, and sunroof. The color scheme is carried over on the interior with a Synergy Green instrument panel and door inserts with green ambient lighting that run along the door panels. Synergy Green stitching also accents the Jet Black cloth seats, steering wheel, shift knob, and center console. Other standard features include paddle shifters, the Convenience and Connectivity Package which offers Bluetooth phone connectivity, a USB port for MP3 players, and remote vehicle start for models equipped with an automatic transmission. Though this edition of the Camaro has certain accessories that come available with the RS package, the RS package itself was not available to purchase with the Synergy Camaro order. The Synergy Special Edition was available in limited production from February 2010 to May 2010, a total of 2425 were sold.

=== 2010 Indianapolis 500 Pace Car Special Edition (RPO Z4Z) ===
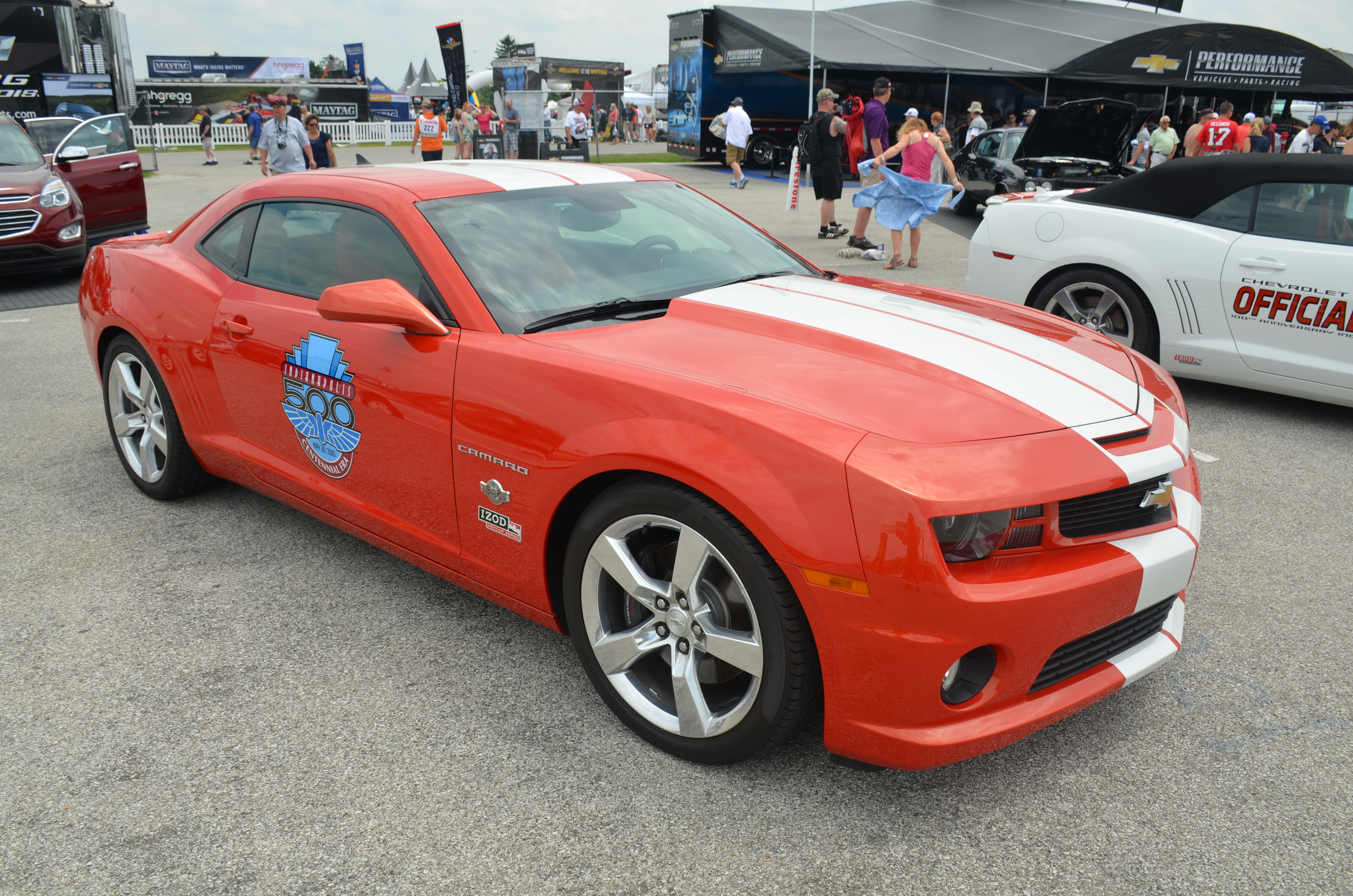
Camaro Indianapolis 500 Pace Car Special Edition

In April 2010, General Motors and the Indianapolis Motors Speedway announced limited production of the Pace Car that was introduced to pace the 2010 Indianapolis 500. The Indianapolis 500 Pace Car replica is based on the 2010 Camaro 2SS Automatic 400 hp 6.2 L V8 model with RS package which includes the Inferno Orange exterior paint scheme with White Diamond rally stripes that run from front to the rear of the entire body of the car. The event and organization logos of the Indianapolis 500 Speedway are decaled on both driver and passenger doors with special badging placed underneath both front quarter panels of the Camaro nameplate. Special event stitching of the 2010 event replaces the "SS" stitching on the headrests of the front interior seating, with special premium accented floor mats and Inferno Orange accented interior trim kit. The front grille is replaced with the heritage grille that was made available as an aftermarket accessory from GM, with the addition of an Inferno Orange trimmed engine cover. Production was limited to 294 units, the majority of which were produced in automatics and a few had manual transmissions (Mostly Canadian). Out of the 294 units, 50 were sent to the Indianapolis 500 event (Festival cars) which could be seen during Pole Day prior to the event with each darning a license plate reflecting its number from 1-50. 45 other units were sent to Canada and 199 were sent to the 186 top Camaro selling dealerships based on retail sales in the United States.

Production of the 2010 Camaro Z4Z began halfway through the 2010 model year. The production of the 2010 Camaro was temporarily halted in April 2010 when all 294 of the Z4Z models were produced. After the 294 Z4Z models were produced, production of the standard models resumed.

The 2010 Camaro 2SS Indy 500 Pace Car (Z4Z) is the second lowest production number Camaro pace car that has been made available for public purchase since its debut at the Indianapolis 500 in 1967.

=== SLP Performance ZL550/ZL575 Special Edition ===
The SLP Performance ZL550 and ZL575 are limited production versions of the 2010 Chevrolet Camaro SS from SLP Performance. The ZL550 has a supercharged 6.2 L V8 petrol engine producing 550 hp (410 kW). Torque is sent to the rear wheels through a 6-speed automatic transmission. The car has 20-inch, 5-spoke wheels with ZL center caps, and a decal on the rear tail light in flat black. Additionally, it has heritage style SS badges on the front grille and rear panel, three ZL550 or ZL575 OEM-styled exterior badges, and a ZL550 or ZL575 logo embroidered in the headrests and floor mats. It also includes a 1-250 numbered plaque on the dashboard, and numbered key fobs. A tweaked suspension lowered the front axle by 1 in (25 mm) and the rear by 0.8 in (20 mm). The ZL575 has the same 6.2 L V8 engine, also upgraded with the ZL550's supercharger. However, engine power was rated at 575 hp. The ZL575 models have the 6-speed manual transmission found in the standard Camaro which was enhanced to be able to handle the increased input torque. As a factory option, the ZL575 could be equipped with the clutch off of a Corvette ZR1. Also, an option for the ZL550's transmission was being equipped with a 3.45 gear ratio. Brembo brakes were also an option. Sales began at Chevy dealers in mid-2010.

=== Styling Special ===
The Camaro Styling Special is a version of the 2010 Camaro LT RS and SS RS for the Japanese market. It features a rally stripe, front grille, and door sill plate (standard on SS RS).

The vehicles went on sale in September 2010.

=== Production ===
Assembly of the fifth-generation Camaro took place in Canada like its predecessor. Production, however, was shifted from Sainte-Thérèse, Quebec to Oshawa, Ontario.

Chevrolet started taking pre-orders for the 2010 Camaro on October 13, 2008, however sales to rentals and orders made after the pre-order period, were processed before many of the pre-orders. By the end of 2008, General Motors confirmed more than 10,000 advanced orders and that all pre-orders would be completed by October 2009. Camaro sales began in April 2009.

On January 17, 2009, the first production Camaro (VIN #100001) was auctioned at the 2009 Barrett-Jackson Collector Car Auction in an American Heart Association charity lot. The vehicle was purchased by Hendrick Motor Sports CEO Rick Hendrick for US$350,000.

By late June 2009, Chevrolet dealers were reporting that the Camaro sales were exceeding availability, with prices running about US$5,000 above the MSRP. It was suggested that this may be influenced by the prominent presence of the vehicle in the Transformers movie sequel that was released worldwide throughout the month.

General Motors sold 61,648 Camaros in the 2009 calendar year. Sales of the Camaro did not start until April 2009.

=== Marketing ===
A 2010 Camaro was shown while the main character was driving in the NBC series My Own Worst Enemy, which premiered on October 13, 2008, as part of a marketing arrangement between GM and NBC.

== 2011 model year ==
=== Camaro coupé ===
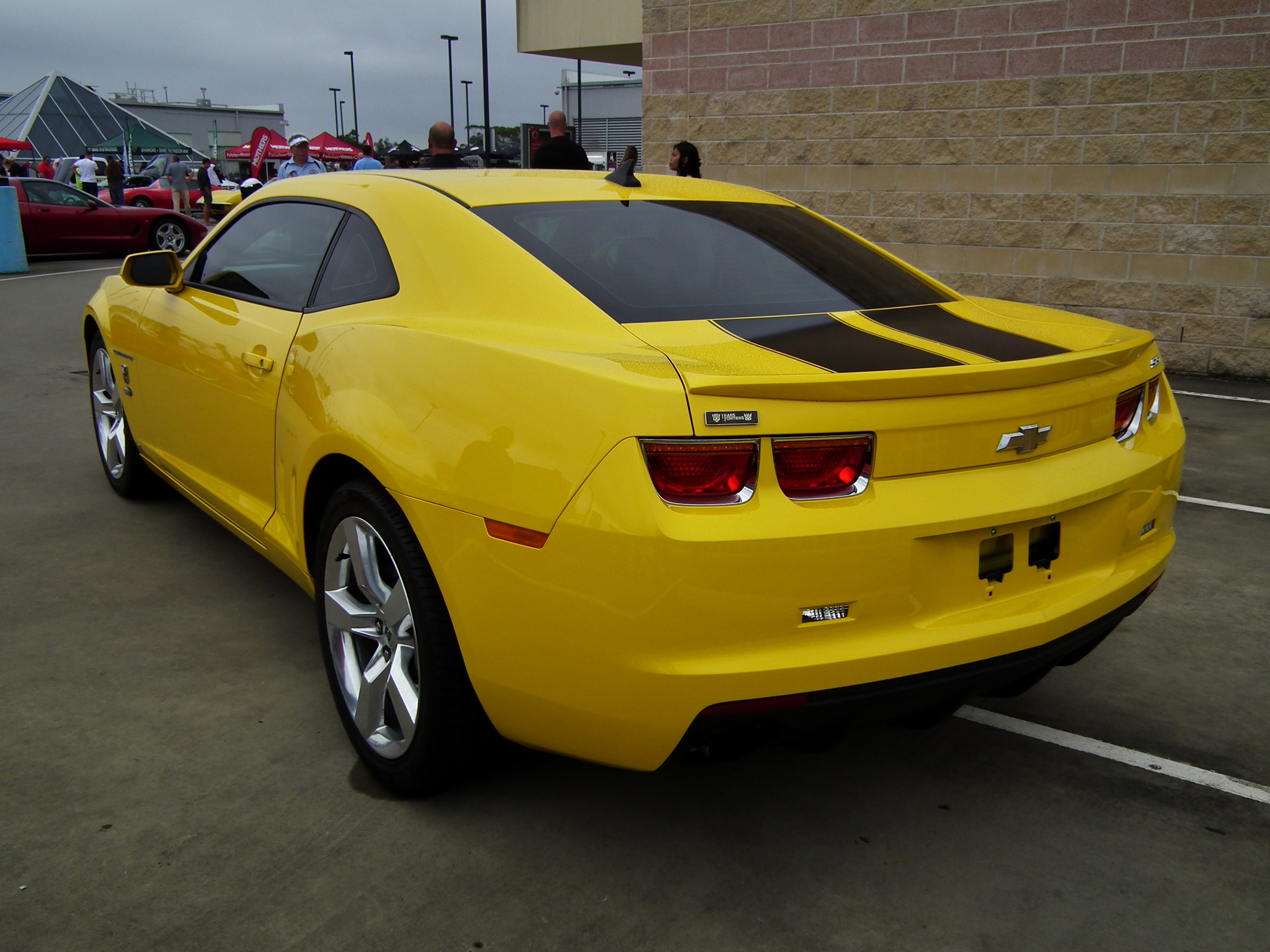
Camaro SS coupe

For the 2011 model year, the Camaro V6 engine was rated at 312 hp (233 kW) and 278 lb⋅ft (377 N⋅m), an increase of 8 hp (6.0 kW) and 5 lb⋅ft (6.8 N⋅m) from 2010. No engineering changes were made for the increase as GM claimed the 304 hp (227 kW) in the 2010 Camaro's engine was a conservative rating.

The Synergy Green color from the 2010 Special Edition would be available on all 2011 model trim levels. A head-up display (HUD) with most of the instrument panel's information would be offered. The HUD is a modified version of the Chevrolet Corvette's display. The main difference is that the version in the Corvette is able to display lateral g-forces, while that amenity is not available on the Camaro. Due to the 2011 Fukushima earthquake, certain pigments were not available to make certain colors.

In November 2011, the export version (excluding the Japanese version) of the Camaro was introduced after a two-year delay. The delay was due to unexpected domestic demand. The export version included different tail lamps with integrated reverse and amber turn signal lamps, larger external rearview mirrors with integrated side turn signal repeaters, a rear bumper without reverse light inserts, and other changes as to comply with ECE regulations.

The Japanese model was unveiled in golf courses in Tokyo, Yokohama, Nagoya, Osaka. Japanese models include LT RS and SS RS with 6-speed automatic transmission and the choice of 9 body colors (including New Red Jewel).

=== Neiman Marcus Edition ===
On October 19, 2010, at 12:00 noon EDT, orders of the Neiman Marcus Edition Camaro Convertible were opened through Neiman Marcus and sold out within three minutes becoming one of the quickest-selling special edition vehicles that General Motors has put out in the market. A total of 75 units were produced and deliveries began in early 2011. The NM Camaro was based on both the 1SS and 2SS models and was equipped with the 6.2 L V8 engine in both options of either manual or automatic transmissions with the equal fuel efficiency and power output of the 2011 Camaro. Accessories that separated this edition from the rest were noticeably that of the exclusive tri-coat exterior paint called "Deep Bourdeaux" with ghosted rally stripes spanning across the hood to the rear deck along with a separate "Silver" painted windshield surround. A two-toned interior leather trim also separated the special edition from the rest with basic black leather with "Amber" interior accents on the front and rear seats as well as on the armrests all with accented "Brilliant Red" stitching on the aforementioned including the center console, steering wheel, and shift knob. A black interior trim kit was placed upon the door panels and dash which replaced the standard "Midnight Silver" that came in standard 2LT and 2SS models. 21-inch five-spoke wheels that were not yet released to the general public for separate purchasing until late 2011 were placed wrapped with Pirelli P-Zero tires that also contained a Brilliant Red strip flowing along the outer edge of the wheel to follow that stitching in the interior. This edition of the Camaro was the only batch of units that were to follow trimming keys of that from the 2007 Camaro Convertible Concept with the Silver painted Window surround, interior leather trim placements, and wide spoke wheels. No Camaro Convertibles produced from the factory ever provided a different color windshield surround other than the produced body color.

=== Convertible (2011–2015) ===
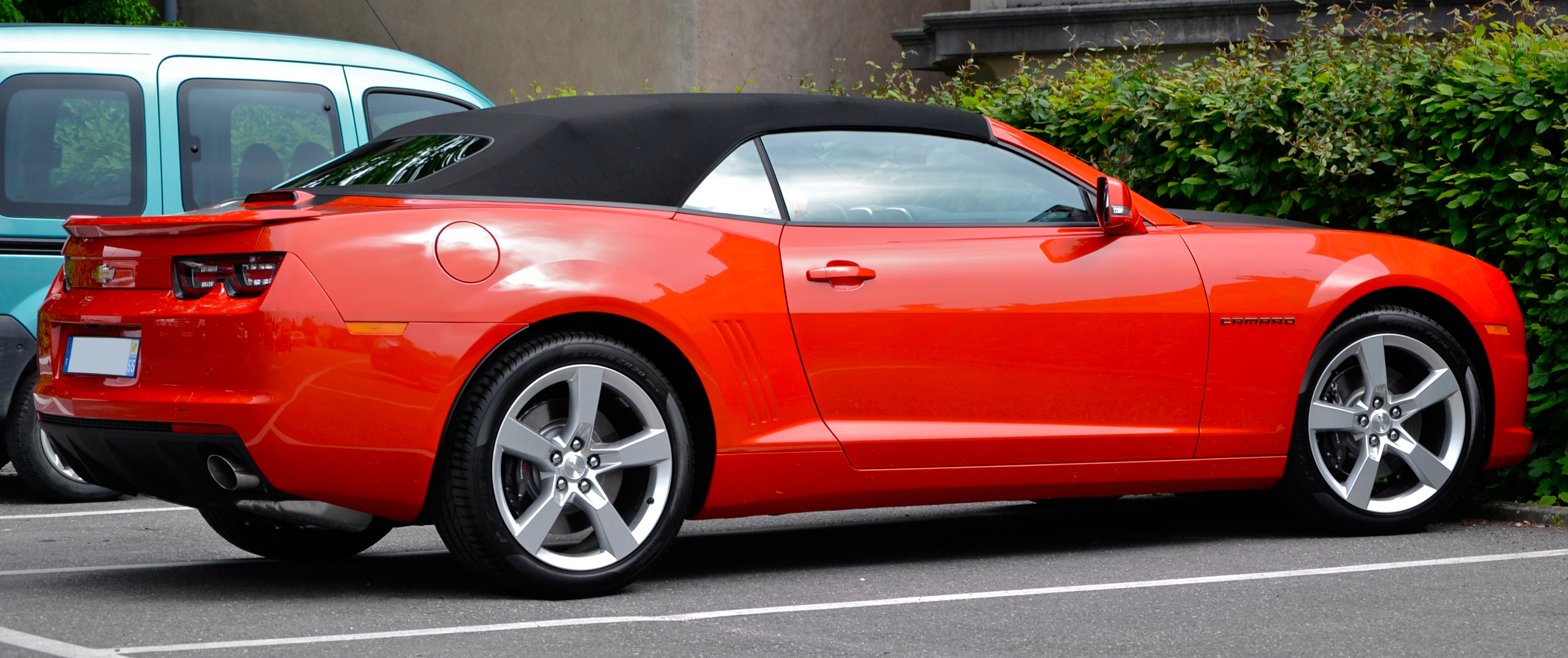
Chevrolet Camaro SS convertible

Production of the 2011 Camaro Convertible began on January 31, 2011, in Oshawa, Ontario, where the coupe was assembled. It arrived in dealerships in February, and is available in both base and SS versions like the coupe. The Camaro convertible added an aluminum brace over the engine assembly, and under the transmission.

US models include a choice of V6 and V8 (SS only) engines, Tremec TR-6060 6-speed manual or Hydra-Matic 6L50 6-speed automatic transmission, and went on sale in 2011–12.

Japanese models include a choice of four base colors (silver ice metallic, black, victory red, and summit white) and two premium (rally yellow, inferno orange metallic) body colors. They went on sale on 15 July 2011.

=== 2011 Synergy Series ===
From concept to reality, the 2011 Synergy Series Camaro first made its debut at the 2009 SEMA event as a concept under the tag of Camaro Chroma. This concept was to display a combination of various parts from the Chevrolet Camaro's accessories catalog of both current and conceptual pieces to provide a different appearance from the other Camaro models. In 2010, the car would pop its face again however under a different exterior paint scheme of "Cyber Gray Metallic" and a new nameplate of Synergy Series. It was made known that the Synergy car being shown at the 2010 SEMA event was not just going to be a concept but that it would be made available to the general public to purchase for the 2011 year model run. On May 5, 2011, orders were open to those who desired to purchase the appearance package on top of the price of either a 2LT or 2SS in either a coupe or convertible plus the purchase of the RS package was required. Only the exterior colors of Victory Red, Summit White, or Black could be made with purchase. Upon ordering the Synergy Series Camaro people had the option to choose between two different packages:

Level One (RPO: AJA): Red interior stitching on gray leather-appointed interior seats, center console, steering wheel, shifter boot and knob, and armrests on the doors. Switchblade Silver interior trim kit on dash and door panels with accented red light piping in the door trim, footwells, and cup holders. Body-colored ground effects, Heritage grille, Blade spoiler, and antenna. Red engine cover and red-colored Brembo brake calipers. Premium floor mats with red edging and Silver stripe Yenko inspired decals on the hood, mailslot, rear deck, and side gills.

Level Two (RPO: AJB): All Content from the Level One package with the addition of dealer-installed 21-inch wide five-spoke wheels with "Blade Silver" inserts and "Red Flange" stripe along the edge of wheels.

Only 500 units of this package incorporated into the Camaros were to be produced for the 2011 model year run, however, only 400 were actually ordered. The name Synergy was decided by Chevrolet to be not only known for the green color of the first run of special edition Camaros in 2010 but to be a yearly special edition Camaro offered by Chevrolet for their determination to release at least two special edition Camaros every year. So the word "Series" was added to reflect the editions as an annual special edition.

=== XM Accessory Appearance Package ===
The XM Accessory Appearance Package (RPO: ABN) was introduced at the 2010 SEMA event providing an option that would differentiate the 1LT model from the rest as special editions were being offered towards the SS models. Ordering of the appearance package began on February 17, 2011, until the end of the 2011 model and was limited to exterior colors of Black, Cyber Gray Metallic, and Imperial Blue Metallic. Integrated with the purchase of the XM Accessory Appearance Package was a front body-colored Heritage Grille, 21-inch diameter 5-spoke polished aluminum wheels, Silver strip running along the side of the Camaro following the contours of the shoulders to the front with pinstriping, premium carpeted floor mats, rear spoiler without the need to purchase an RS (RPO: WRS) package and a 12-month free trial subscription to XM Satellite Radio.

=== Production ===
Production of the 2011 Camaro began on 7 June 2010.

=== Marketing ===
As part of the 2011 Camaro launch in Japan, a Camaro 2-day campaign took place between July 1, 2010, and September 30, 2010, featuring a 2-day test drive chosen by raffle from Chevrolet dealers.

After the 2010 version incarnation of Hawaii Five-0 was picked up by CBS for broadcast, starting with the second episode (September 27, 2010), a Chevrolet product placement deal includes a Camaro RS used by Danny Williams (Scott Caan) used for the first three seasons, with a 2014 Camaro replacing it for Season 4. A second Camaro (an SS variant), in yellow, is used by Max Bergman (Masi Oka), starting in the second season.

The Chevrolet Camaro was launched in China in April 2011 through imports under the Legend trim level. The 3.6 L LLT V6 was the standard engine paired to a 6-speed automatic gearbox. Imports for the fifth generation Camaro ended in 2015.

== 2012 model year update ==
=== Camaro, RS, 45th Anniversary Special Edition ===
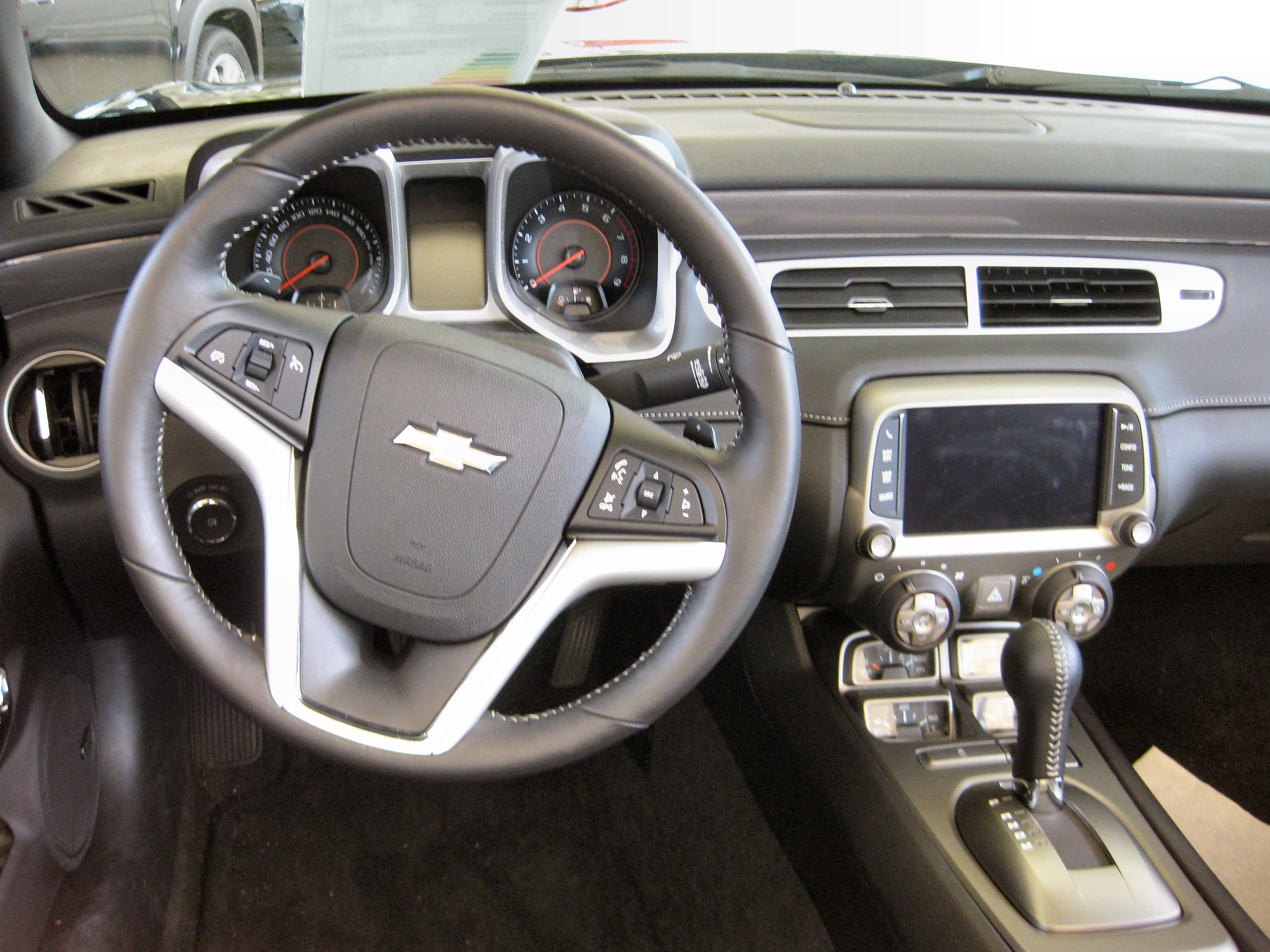
The refreshed interior for the 2012 model year, the steering wheel is now congruent to steering wheels offered in Chevrolet vehicles at the time such as the Chevrolet Cruze.

Changes to the 2012 Chevrolet Camaro include the introduction of the 323 hp (241 kW) 3.6 L direct injection LFX V6 engine replacing the outgoing V6 engine, a new FE4 suspension package for SS coupe (retuned front and rear dampers, new solid front (23 mm) and rear (24 mm) stabilizer bars, 20-inch aluminum wheels with P245/45R20 front and P275/40R20 rear tires (from the SS)), a revised instrument panel appearance (new instrument graphics and trim), a new steering wheel design with improved ergonomics, a power lift feature for the front passenger seat, a new Rear Vision Package (a rearview camera system and an auto-dimming mirror to the existing Rear Park Assist feature), a new rear spoiler as standard, taillamps from RS appearance package option becomes standard for all vehicles. Crystal Red Tintcoat replaces Red Jewel as an exterior color.

Changes to the RS package include a new, body-color 'sharkfin' antenna.

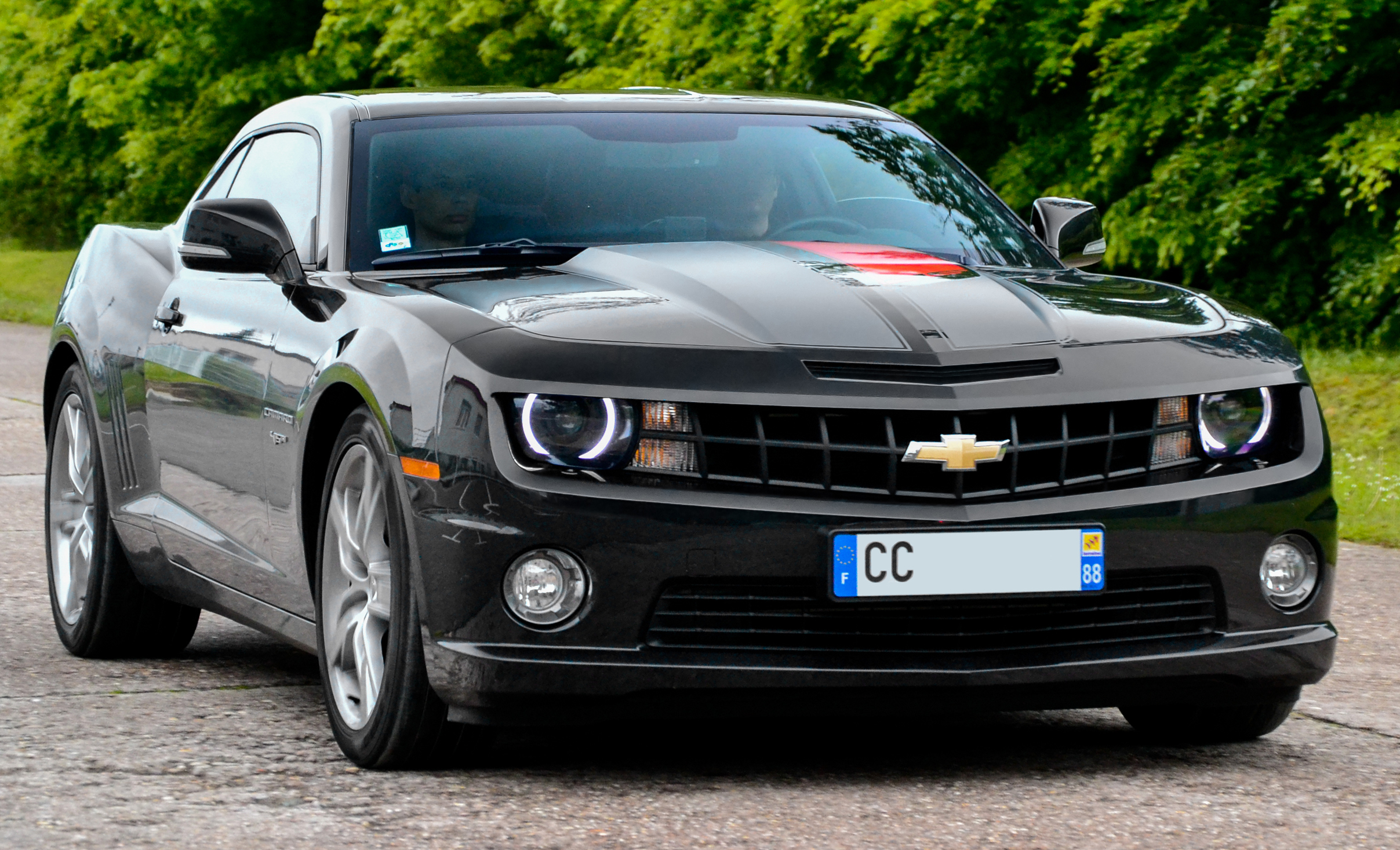
Camaro 45th Anniversary Edition coupe

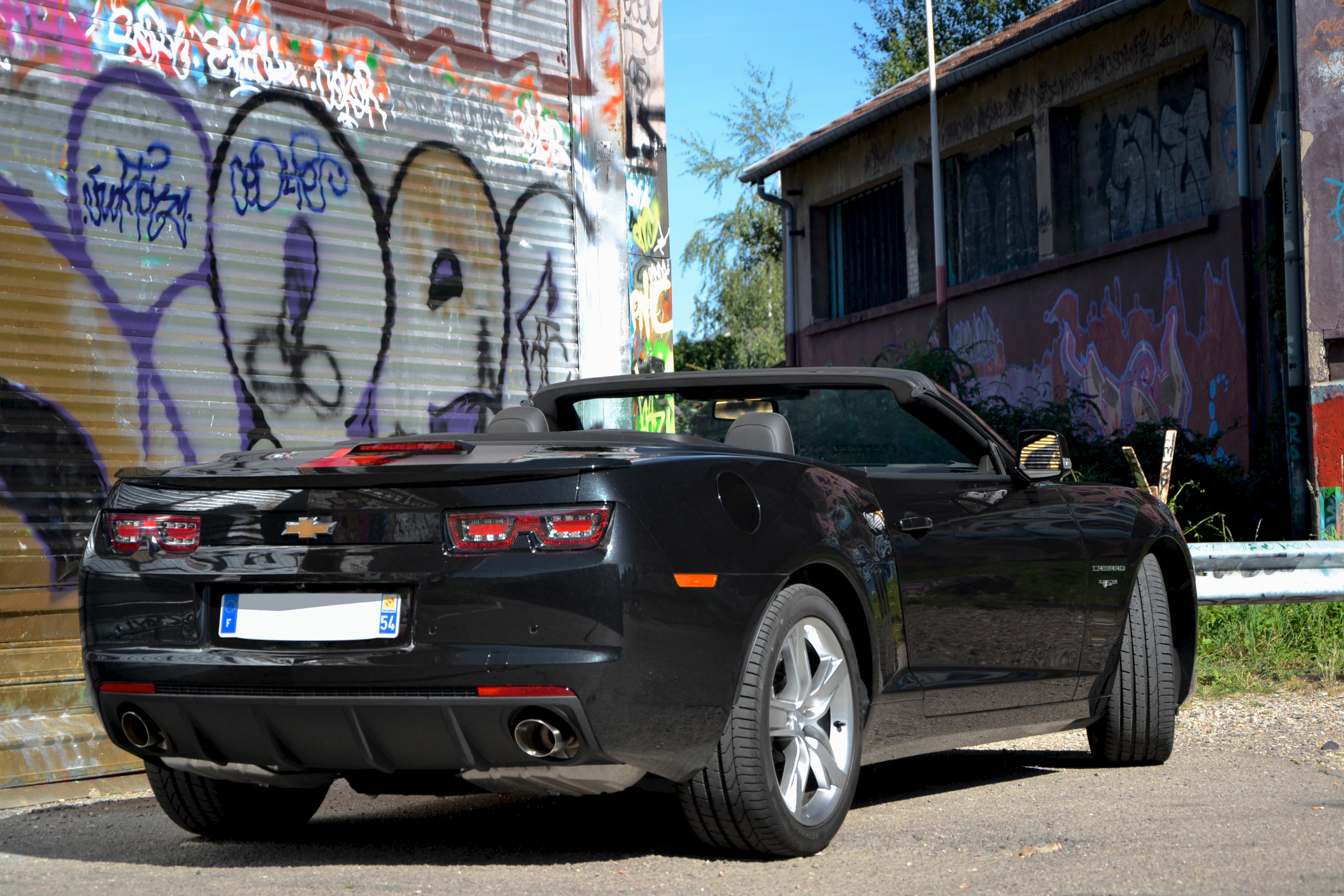
Camaro 45th Anniversary Edition convertible

The 45th Anniversary Special Edition is based on 2LT and 2SS for both coupe and convertible body styles, with a unique rally stripe in red and silver on the hood and deck, Carbon Flash Metallic body color, badges located beneath the front fender emblems, new-design 20-inch wheels in dark silver, fog lamp and taillamp bezels finished in dark silver, RS-style taillamp lenses, standard rear spoiler and HID headlamps, body-color roof molding, Jet Black interior with leather-trimmed seats featuring the 45th Anniversary logo, white instrument panel and door trim inserts with the 45th Anniversary logo on the instrument panel, red, white and blue stitching on the seats, steering wheel, shift knob/boot, door armrests, and console lid; as well as 45th Anniversary logo on the steering wheel and sill plates.

The 45th Anniversary Special Edition was unveiled in Camaro5 Fest II in Arizona.

Japanese models went on sale in January 2012. Early models included coupe (LT RS, SS RS), convertible, 45th Anniversary Special Edition.

=== ZL1 (2012–2015) ===
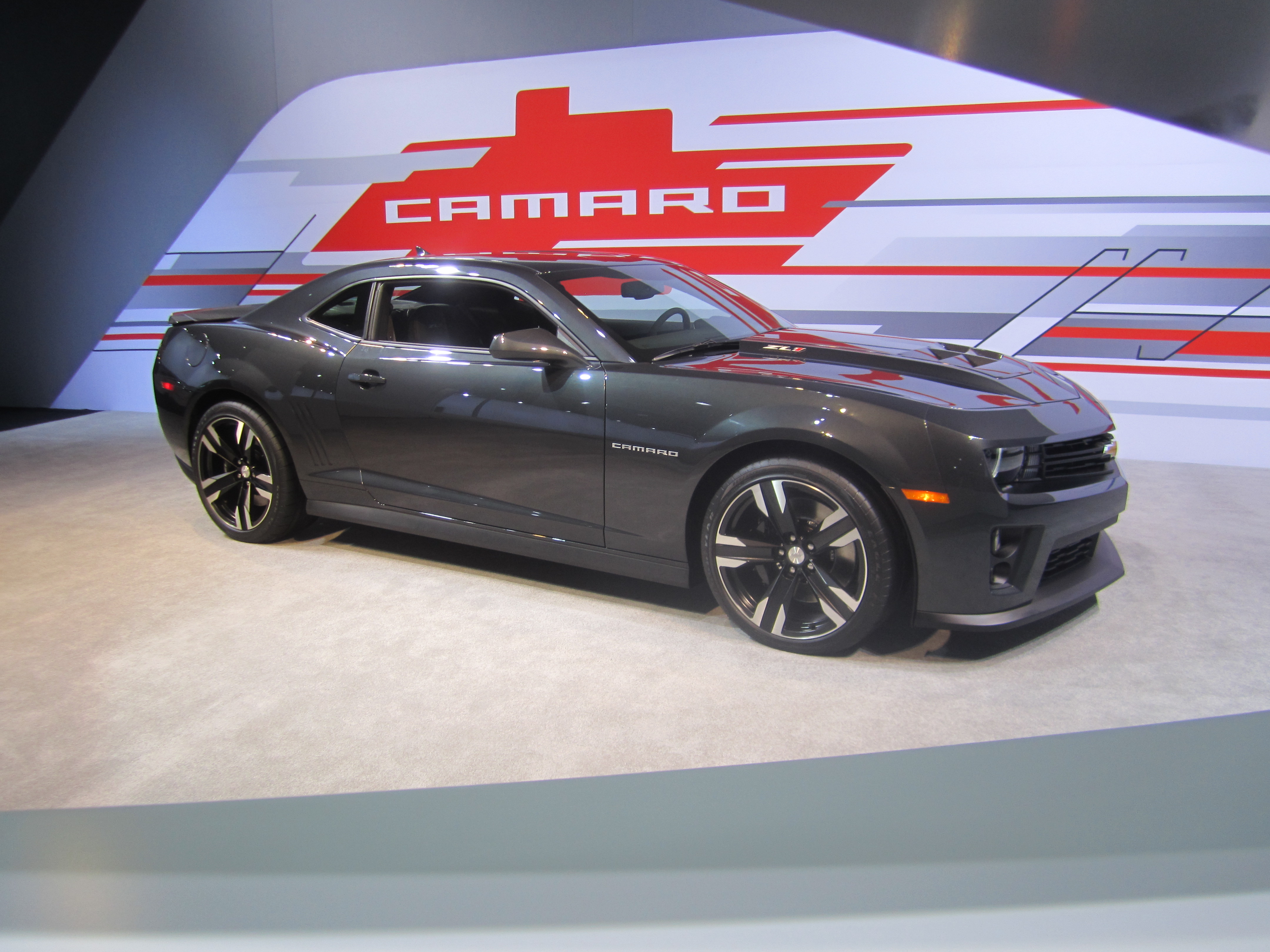
Chevrolet Camaro ZL1

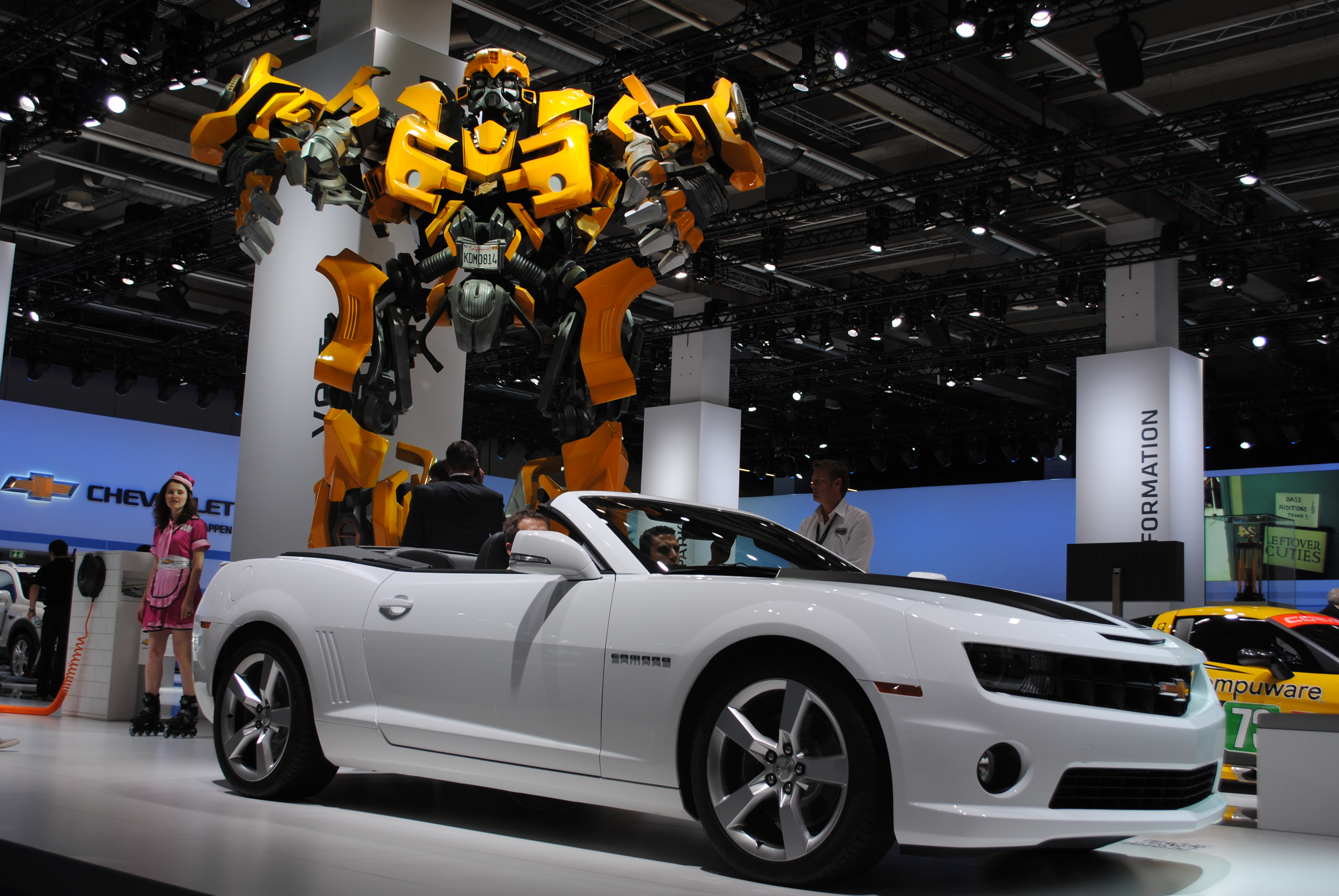
Chevrolet Camaro ZL1 Convertible

Unveiled at the 2011 Chicago Auto Show, the ZL1 is a high-performance variant of the Camaro SS. At least 30 percent of the parts on the ZL1 are exclusive to the model.

The car features a 6,162 cc (376 cu in) LSA V8 engine with a supercharger which produced a maximum boost pressure of 7 psi (0.48 bar). The engine has a power output of 580 hp (588 PS; 433 kW) at 6,000 rpm and produces 556 lb⋅ft (754 N⋅m) of torque at 4,200 rpm. Power is delivered to the rear wheels by either a six-speed manual (TR-6060) or a 6L90 automatic transmission. The manual transmission has a stronger output shaft, a more robust rear housing, and an additional mainshaft roller bearing to provide 30% more torque capacity than the automatic transmission used in the Camaro SS. To improve shift quality, there are triple synchronizer rings in some gears, and a revised linkage. A new dual-mass flywheel is bolted to a high-capacity twin-disc clutch. The automatic transmission has a strengthened output shaft and is programmed with three operating modes (Drive/Sport/Manual).

The ZL1 has a Magnetic ride suspension and a performance-oriented traction management system. The Magnetic Ride suspension system can sense the need for a damping correction 1,000 times per second and make that change in five milliseconds. Brembo supplied the braking system, with six-piston calipers at the front and four-piston calipers at the rear. A duct system delivers air from the grille to the brake rotors. The 20-inch forged aluminum wheels are fitted with Goodyear 285/35ZR-20 front and 305/35ZR-20 rear tires.

=== 2012 Camaro 2LS (2012) ===
The Camaro 2LS was introduced in 2012. Designed for better fuel economy using a slightly different gear ratio than other V6 automatics, this model was ostensibly the automatic transmission version of the original LS. The LS trim level was now divided into 1LS (manual transmission) and 2LS (automatic transmission) trims. In addition to the gearing differences, the 2LS automatic transmission did not have "Sport Mode," nor did it allow the driver to manually shift with the steering-wheel-mounted paddle shifters. Instead, the vehicle goes into Electronic Range Select (2LS), which only allows the driver to choose the highest gear that the transmission will automatically upshift to.

=== 2012 COPO Camaro (2012–2013) ===
The 2012 COPO Camaro (P/N 20129562) is a limited production version of the Camaro factory drag-racing cars designed for NHRA Stock Eliminator and Super Stock classes. It has a Powerglide automatic transmission with a choice of 3 engines (an LS7 7.0 L V8 or an LSX 5.3 L V8 with a supercharger or a LSX 5.3 L V8 with a Whipple-made supercharger). It also has a choice of 5 body colors (Flat Black, Summit White, Victory Red, Silver Ice Metallic and Ashen Gray Metallic), a solid rear axle, a full chrome moly roll cage, removal of sound deadening and power accessories, rear-seat deletion, a safety harness for the driver, a competition floor shifter, Chevrolet Performance gauges, Bogart racing wheels and Hoosier Racing Tires.

COPO graphics package includes color from the concept vehicle, but in Metallic White, Semi-Gloss Black, Inferno Orange Metallic and Chevy Racing Blue.

Collector's Package includes all three COPO racing engines serial-number-matched to the car, with one installed at the time of delivery.

The COPO Camaro went on sale via a confirmation letter to the registered buyer. Delivery began at the General Motors Performance Build Center in Wixom, Michigan, starting in Summer 2012. Only 69 units were made.

=== 2012 COPO Camaro Convertible (2012–2013) ===
The COPO Camaro Convertible is a convertible variant of the COPO Camaro. It features a supercharged LSX 5.3 L V8 engine with a power output of 550 hp (410 kW), as well as a black or Inferno Orange Metallic body color with additional custom graphics, special interior trim, and a Turbo 400 three-speed automatic transmission. Two units were made which were numbered 68 and 69.

Car number 69 was unveiled at the 2012 SEMA show and was kept at the GM Heritage Center. Car number 69 went on sale at the 2013 Barrett-Jackson Scottsdale Auction in an American Heart Association charity lot.

=== Records ===
In the fall of 2011, a ZL1 completed a lap of the Nürburgring in 7:41.27, equaling or beating the times of more expensive cars like the Porsche 911 Turbo S, Lamborghini Murciélago LP640, and the Mercedes-Benz SLS AMG.

=== Production ===
Production of the ZL1 for the 2012 model year amounted to 1,971 units. 99 were officially allocated for Canada.

Engines for the 2012 COPO Camaro engine were assembled at the Performance Build Center in Wixom, Michigan.

The COPO Camaro models were built by hand starting with hardware from the Oshawa assembly plant, including the same "body in white" body shells racers can purchase from Chevrolet Performance.

A 2012 COPO Camaro engine was built by Hendrick Motorsports owner and Hendrick Automotive Group chairman Rick Hendrick.

Among the 69 2012 COPO Camaros produced, 67 were coupés and 2 were convertibles, 43 cars were equipped with the 427 in^{3} (7.0 L) naturally aspirated engine (including the original proof of concept show car that debuted at the 2011 SEMA Show), 20 cars were equipped with the 327 in^{3} (5.4 L) supercharged engine, 6 cars were equipped with the 327 in^{3} (5.4 L) supercharged engine, 8 customers ordered the collector's package, 32 cars were painted Summit White (including the original show car), 20 cars were painted Black, 12 cars were painted Victory Red, 2 cars were painted Ashen Grey Metallic, 2 cars were painted Silver Ice Metallic, 1 car was painted Inferno Orange Metallic, 12 cars were ordered without COPO graphics.

The final 2012 COPO Camaro Convertible was sold at the 2013 Barrett-Jackson Scottsdale Auction for US$400,000.

=== Marketing ===
Hot Wheels produced a collector's edition 1:64-scale model car based on the Camaro Hot Wheels Concept.

== 2013 model year update ==
=== Camaro, RS, 1LE ===
Changes made in the 2013 model year include:

- 1LE performance package
- Chevrolet MyLink and color-touch navigation
- Hill start assist now standard on all manual transmissions
- ZL1-style shift knob standard on all manual transmissions
- Remote vehicle start now included on 1LT and 1SS with automatic transmission
- Blue Ray Metallic exterior color
- Frameless inside rearview mirror
- New 18-inch and 20-inch wheel designs
- Mojave leather interior upholstery

The 1LE package was offered on 1SS and 2SS coupe models, with an exclusive Tremec TR-6060/MM6 6-speed manual transmission with a standard air-to-liquid cooling system, 3.91 geared limited-slip differential, exclusive monotube rear dampers, 27-mm solid front stabilizer bar, 28-mm solid rear stabilizer bar, higher-capacity rear-axle half shafts, strut tower brace, ZL1-based 20 x 10-inch front and 20 x 11-inch aluminum wheels, 285/35ZR20 Goodyear Eagle Supercar G:2 tires front and rear (identical to the front tires for ZL1), ZL1 wheel bearings, toe links and rear shock mounts; ZL1 high-capacity fuel pump and additional fuel pickups, matte black hood, black front splitter and rear spoiler, 10-spoke ZL1-based wheels; ZL1 flat-bottom steering wheel trimmed in sueded microfiber, short-throw shifter from the ZL1 trimmed in sueded microfiber.

The RS package (available for LT and SS models) added 20-inch wheels, body-color roof moldings and antenna, and high-intensity discharge headlamps.

Changes to the SS models included standard variable-effort electric power steering, optional Recaro bucket seats, and an optional dual-mode exhaust system on manual transmission-equipped models. Both features were introduced on the Camaro ZL1.

Exterior colors include Summit White, Black, Crystal Red Tintcoat, Victory Red, Rally Yellow, Inferno Orange Metallic, Ashen Grey Metallic, and Blue Ray Metallic. The convertible top color choices include black and beige.

The Camaro has a power output of 426 hp (318 kW) when equipped with the 6-speed manual transmission, which is reduced to 400 hp (298 kW) when the car was equipped with the 6-speed automatic transmission.

=== NASCAR Nationwide Series car ===
Unveiled at the 2012 NASCAR Nationwide Series Practice at Indianapolis Motor Speedway, the NASCAR Nationwide Series Camaro coupe incorporated the unique power-bulge hood and deeply recessed grille from the production Camaro. In addition, the design incorporates the distinctive halo light rings and dual-port grille appearances, and the gold bowtie.

=== Giovanna Edition (2013) ===
Unveiled at the 2013 Tokyo Auto Salon, the Camaro Giovanna Edition is a variant of the Camaro LT RS and SS RS for the Japanese market. It was developed in collaboration with the owner of the Cadillac/Chevrolet dealership in Tokyo's Kunitachi suburb, with further input from noted Japanese journalist Tatsuya Kushima. It included a choice of 4 body colors (Silver Ice Metallic, Black, Rally Yellow (optional), Summit White), body stripe (original GT decal), fuel cap with Giovanna Edition Logo, front SS or RS emblem, rear Chevrolet bow tie decal, Giovanna Edition Logos on the headrests and door sill plates and Giovanna Wheel 20-inch aluminium wheels made by WTW Corp. It went on sale in March 2013.

=== 2013 "Turbo" Camaro Coupe (2013) ===
Unveiled at the 2013 Chicago Auto Show, the "Turbo" Camaro Coupe is a concept car based on the Camaro coupé and inspired by the DreamWorks Turbo movie snail. Changes included lower rockers and fender flares in a wide body design configuration, a front splitter and rear diffuser, a GT concept rear spoiler, custom front and rear LED lighting with multicolor halo effect for the front headlamps, black body color with a vinyl chrome wrap dark tinted to look like black chrome, 24x10-inch front wheels with a front wheel and custom offset, 24x15-inch rear wheels, a supercharged V8 engine mated to an automatic transmission having a power output of 700 hp (522 kW), a custom intake assembly for the supercharger housing, 2x2 5-inch diameter rear exhaust outlets, custom COPO hood assembly, low profile hood pin system, front suspension with custom adjustable coil-over strut assemblies and rear suspension with custom adjustable rear springs and shock assemblies.

=== 2013 Camaro Hot Wheels Special Edition ===
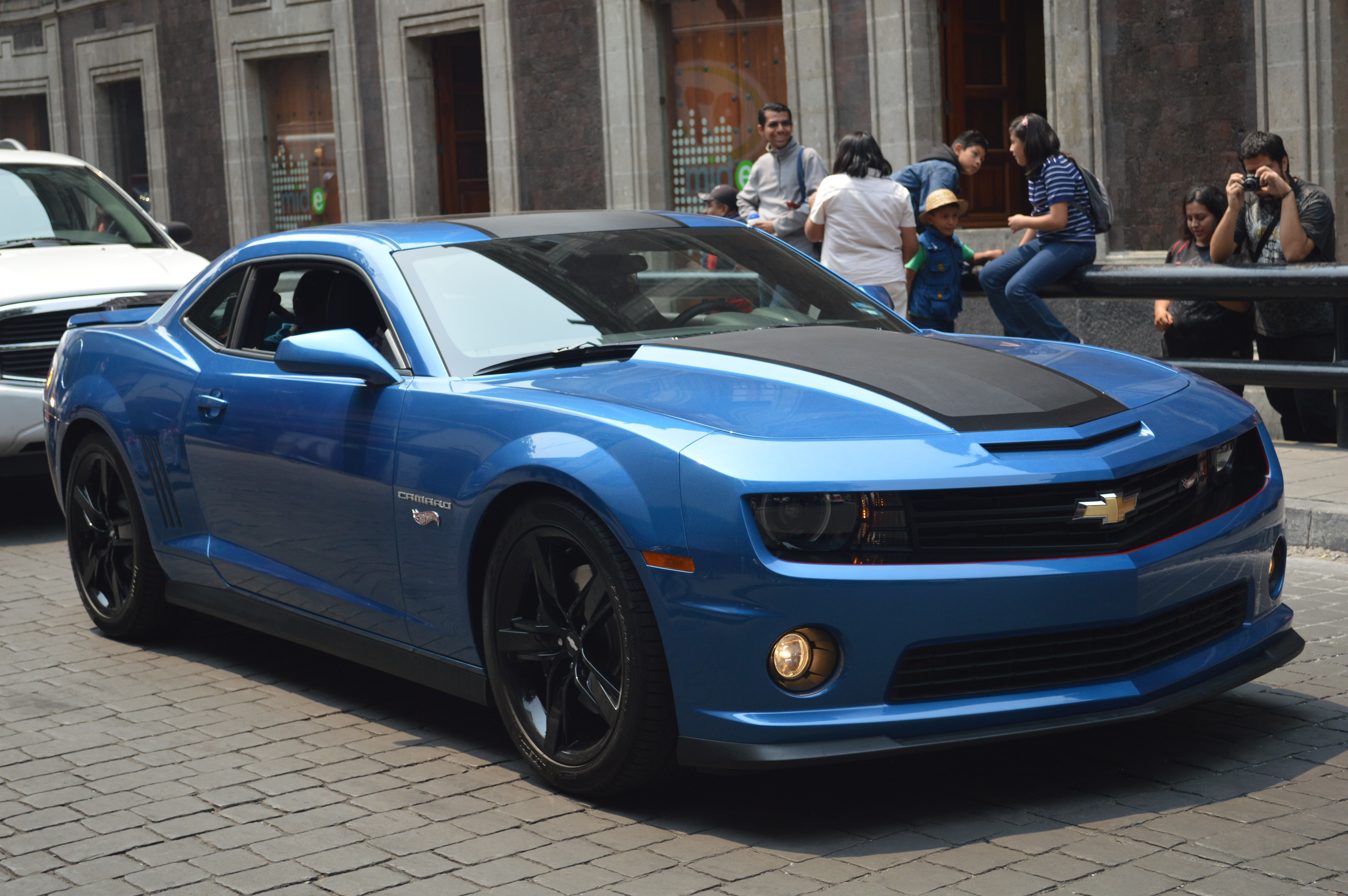
Hot Wheels special edition in Mexico

The Camaro Hot Wheels Special Edition is a special variant of the Camaro available in coupe and convertible body styles, with a choice of 2LT (V6) and 2SS (V8) trims with a ZL1 appearance package. Changes include:

- ZL1 rear spoiler (coupe models)
- ZL1 front upper grille
- Ground effects package, including front splitter and rocker treatment
- Black 21-inch wheels with red outline stripe
- Two-tone matte hood graphic and rear taillight panel "blackout" graphic
- Fender "flame" graphics
- Hot Wheels grille and decklid logos. Dragon flames.
- Black leather-trimmed interior with red and black seat stitching with the Hot Wheels logo embroidered on the front seats.
- Black instrument panel and door inserts
- Hot Wheels-style flame decal on each rear quarter panel
- Hot Wheels Edition sill plates
- Camaro logo premium floor mats with red edging

HotWheels	Special	Edition	Final	Production	Numbers
Model		edition	Trans		Count
1ES37	2SS COUPE	HWS	MYC	AUTO SS	559
1ES37	2SS COUPE	HWS	M10	MANUAL SS	354
1EF37	2LT COUPE	HWS	MYB	AUTO V6	263
1ES67	2SS CONVERT	HWS	MYC	AUTO SS	203
1ES67	2SS CONVERT	HWS	M10	MANUAL SS	57
1EF67	2LT CONVERT	HWS	MYB	AUTO V6	46
1EF37	2LT COUPE	HWS	MV5	MANUAL V6	34
1EF67	2LT CONVERT	HWS	MV5	MANUAL V6	8
					1524

The Hot Wheels Edition was unveiled at the 2012 SEMA Show, followed by the 2013 Indianapolis 500.

Production began in the first quarter of 2013, and orders began in October 2012.

Japanese models went on sale in limited quantities (10 units in total), which included Kinetic Blue Metallic body color, black 20-inch wheels, HOT WHEELS decal stripe, exclusive rear spoiler, front leather seats with HOT WHEELS embroidering, engine cover in black, premium floor mat and the LFX V6 engine.

=== 2013 COPO Camaro (2013) ===
The 2013 COPO Camaro is a limited production variant of the Camaro factory drag-racing cars designed for NHRA Stock Eliminator classes, with a new manual or Powerglide automatic transmission and a choice of 3 engines (a 350-cubic-inch engine rated at 325 hp (242 kW), a 396-cubic-inch engine rated at 375 hp (280 kW) or a 427-cubic-inch engine rated at 425 hp (317 kW)). It also features a fuel-injection system, engine management from a Holley HP EFI electronic control unit with self-tuning fuel table strategies and data logging, Holley Hi-Ram intake manifold, rear axle gearing optimized for each vehicle depending on the engine and transmission, a 'heritage' grille and standard-production (non-HID) headlamps, new exterior graphics choices with engine-size call-outs, revised interior package with custom carpet and new switch panel, dedicated racing wiring harness, and revised front springs that enhance performance, transmission cooler integrated with radiator, choice of 5 body colors (Black, Summit White, Victory Red, Silver Ice Metallic and Ashen Gray Metallic), NHRA-approved roll cage and other safety equipment, racing chassis and suspension components (including a unique solid rear axle system in place of a regular-production Camaro's independent rear axle), lightweight Bogart racing wheels, Hoosier Racing Tires and a sequenced build serial number matched to the engine. The car is sold without a Vehicle identification number (VIN) though, and thus cannot be registered for highway use.

Engine Collector's Package includes all three COPO racing engines serial-number-matched to the car, with one installed at the time of delivery.

The special edition went on sale by signing up on the COPO Camaro Mailing List in February 2013, with randomly chosen buyers identified by March of the same year. Production began in April 2013, with deliveries starting in early Summer. Production amounted to a total of 69 units.

=== Aftermarket production ===
The 2013 COPO Camaro #041 was built by Richard Rawlings of Gas Monkey Garage and Dennis Collins of Collins Bros. Jeep at the Wixom plant. The vehicle was sold for US$137,500.00 (~$187,135 in 2025) (including buyers commission) at the 2013 Barrett-Jackson Reno auction. The production of the vehicle was featured in Fast N' Loud.

=== Production ===
Production Numbers

- 1LT: 25,051 units
- 2LT: 20,142 units
- 1SS: 18,602 units
- 2SS: 14,772 units

== 2014 facelift ==
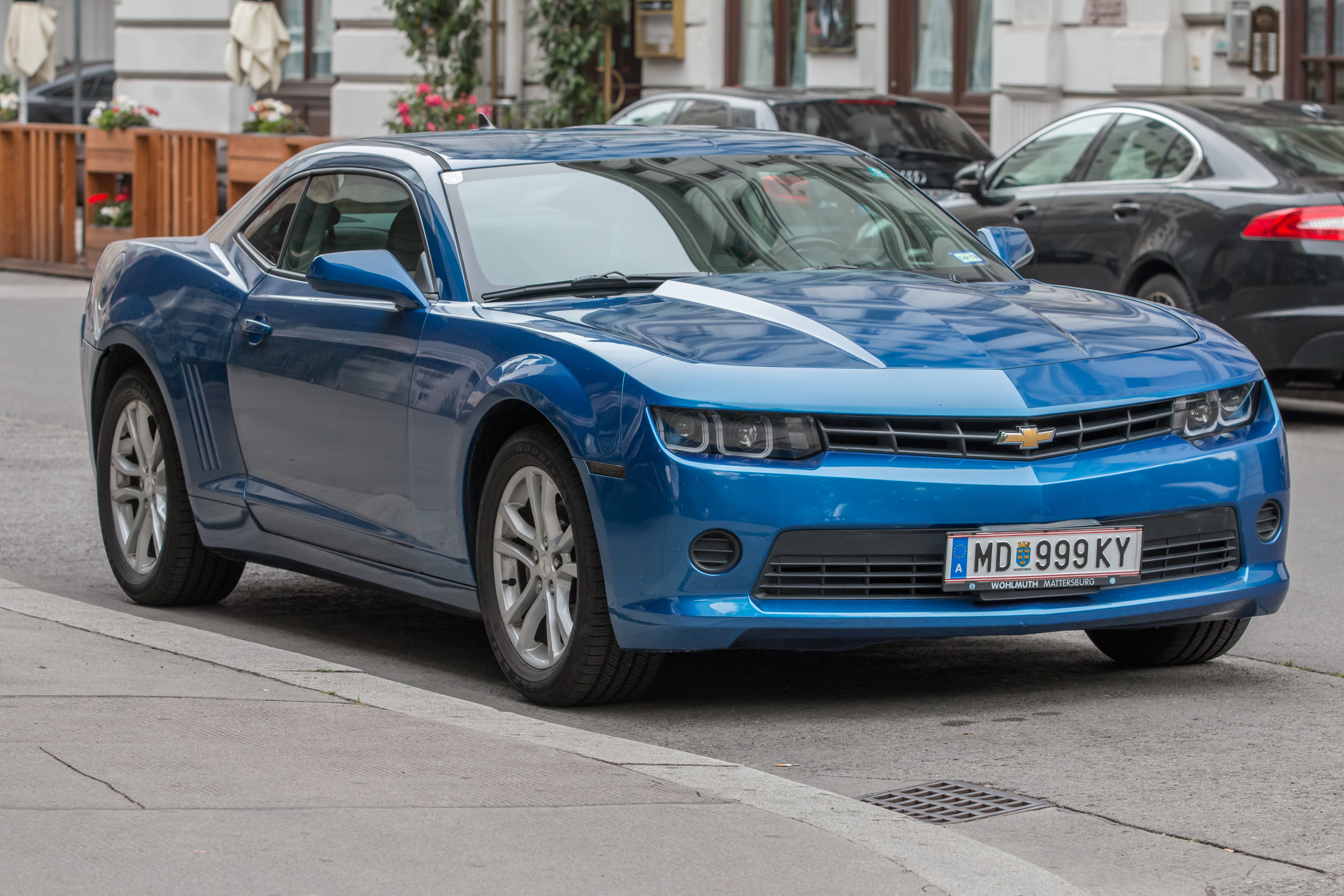
2015 Camaro RS (front view)

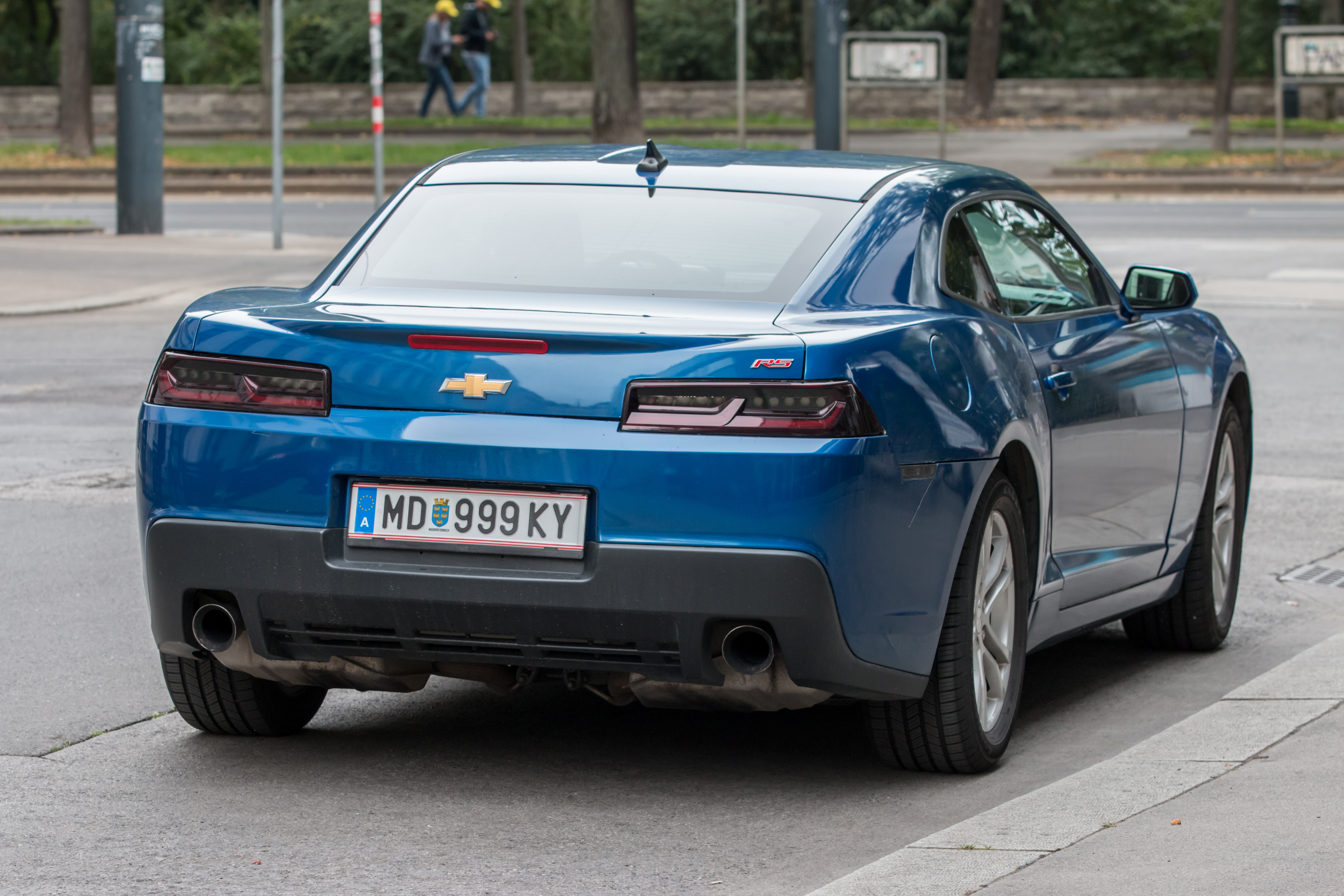
2015 Camaro RS (rear view)

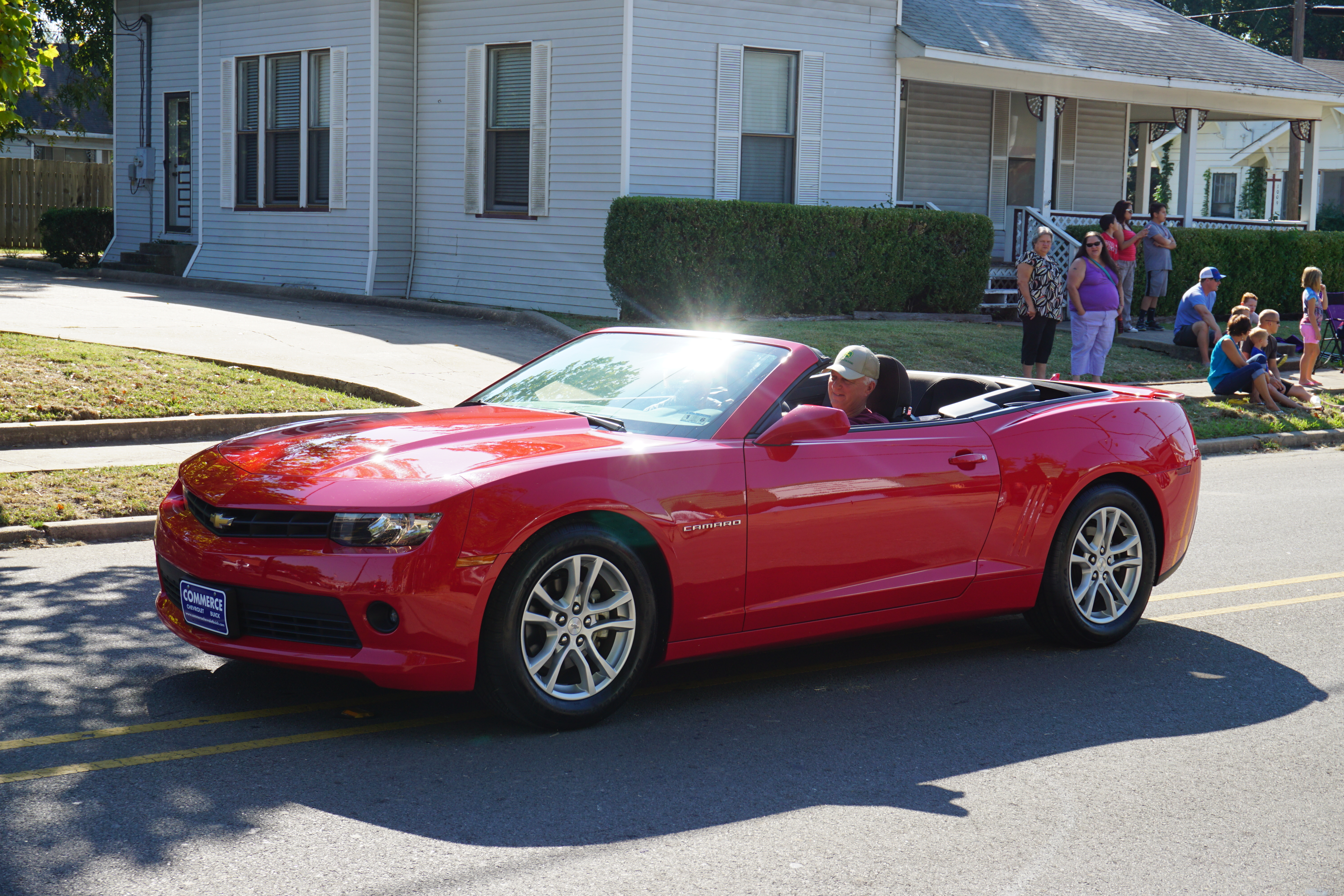
Facelift Chevrolet Camaro V6 convertible

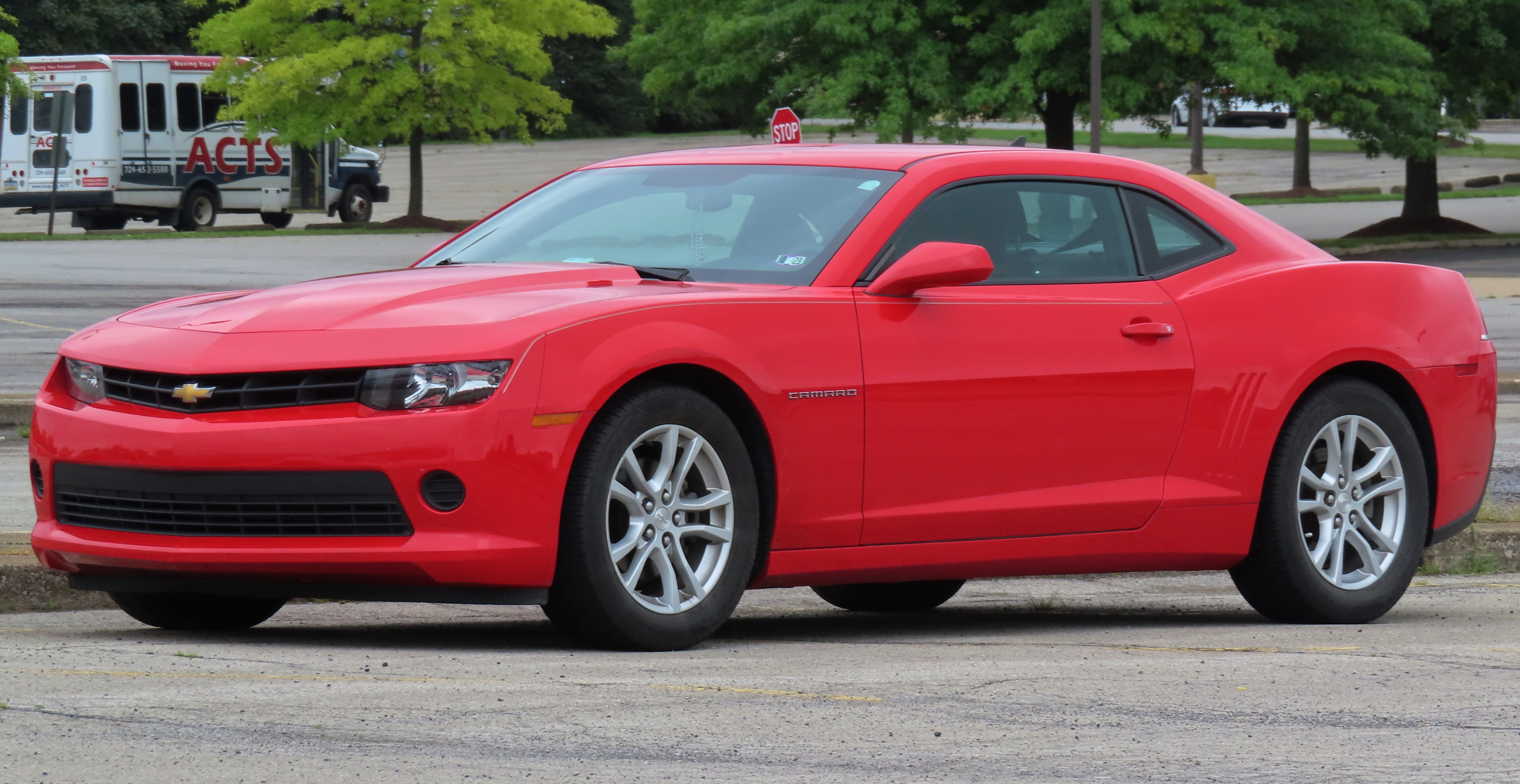
Facelift Chevrolet Camaro 2LS coupe

Changes for the 2014 model year include a redesigned front and rear end in corporative new head and tail light assembly, resulting in a wider, lower, more contemporary appearance, and a front fascia featuring a wider lower opening as well as a narrower upper opening that also updates the appearance of the iconic “halo ring” HID headlamps on the Camaro RS package. Other additions include a functional hood vent on the Camaro SS and optional Recaro seats with microfiber suede inserts for the SS and ZL1 packages. The Head-Up Display and Driver Information Center were also now in color display for the 2LT, 2SS and ZL1 models.

US models of the 2014 Camaro arrived at Chevrolet dealers later in 2013. The Camaro Z/28 was expected to appear at track events across the United States in spring 2014.

European Camaro convertible and coupé included new MyLink-connected radio, and were set to arrive at Chevrolet dealerships at the end of 2013.

=== Camaro Z/28 ===
Unveiled at the 2013 New York Auto Show (in coupe form), followed by the 2013 Frankfurt Motor Show (in convertible and coupe form), the Camaro Z/28 is a higher performance version Camaro with a full aerodynamic package designed for optimum performance during track driving. The package includes a large splitter connected to an underbody panel, fender flares over the front and rear wheels, extended rocker panels, redesigned rear spoiler, and a functional diffuser. Other changes include interior trim in matte-metallic Octane finish, a flat-bottomed steering wheel, standard Recaro seats with microfiber suede inserts and manual adjustment, elimination of the seat-back pass through, high-density foam in place of the rigid structure of the seat back and steel mesh of the seat bottom, a 7.0 L LS7 V8 engine co-developed with Corvette Racing, racing-style cold-air induction system with large K&N air filter, standard dual mode exhaust system with larger-diameter pipes, Tremec TR-6060 6-speed manual transmission, limited-slip differential with a helical gear set, 19-inch diameter wheels with Pirelli P Zero Trofeo R 305/30ZR19 tires, Multimatic DSSV spool valve dampers, Brembo Carbon Ceramic Matrix brake discs (394 x 36 mm front and 390 x 32 mm), monoblock calipers (6-piston front, 4-piston rear), elimination of tire inflating kit (except for units sold in Rhode Island and New Hampshire), deletion of interior sound deadener and carpeting from the trunk, replacement of the standard LN4 battery with LN3 battery, replacement of the standard 3.5 mm glass with thinner 3.2 mm glass for the rear window, removal of HID headlamps and foglights and the removal of air conditioning (available as a stand-alone option).

The Z/28 can accelerate from 0–60 mph (0–97 km/h) in 3.95 seconds and can attain a top speed of 188 mph (303 km/h). The Z/28 won the Motor Trend's 2014 Best Driver's Car Award, beating the Alfa Romeo 4C, BMW i8, BMW M4, Nissan GT-R Nismo and five other cars.

=== Marketing ===
Takara Tomy produced a self-transforming Camaro coupe under the Transformers Omnibot line, produced in association with Kenji Ishida of Brave Robotics. The toy was unveiled at the Tokyo Toy Show in 2013.

== Concepts ==
=== Chevrolet Camaro Concept (2006) ===
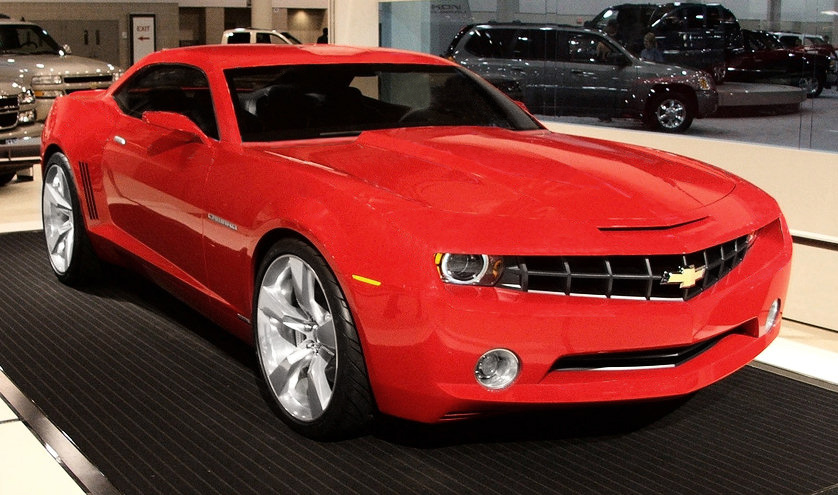
Chevrolet Camaro Concept

The Chevrolet Camaro Concept was designed by a South Korean-born designer Sangyup Lee. The car was based on the Holden developed GM Zeta platform. It was powered by a 6.0-liter LS2 V8 engine rated at 400 hp (298 kW) with active fuel management. The engine was mated to a T56 6-speed manual transmission and the car was equipped with front and rear suspension featuring progressive-rate springs and gas-pressurized dampers, four-wheel vented disc brakes with 14-inch rotors, 21-inch front and 22-inch rear five-spoke cast alloy wheels, and 275/30R21 front and 305/30R22 rear tires. The wheelbase is 110.5 in (281 cm), which is 9 in (23 cm) longer than its predecessor, but an overall length of just 186.2 in (473 cm), 7 in (18 cm) shorter. The design was inspired by the 1969 Camaro.

The Camaro concept was unveiled at the 2006 North American International Auto Show.

AutoWeek editors unanimously awarded the Camaro Concept "Best In Show."

The car was featured in the 2007 film Transformers as Bumblebee's second alternate form. The car itself in the movie, however, was a replica built on a 2006 Pontiac GTO chassis.

=== 2007 Camaro Convertible Concept ===
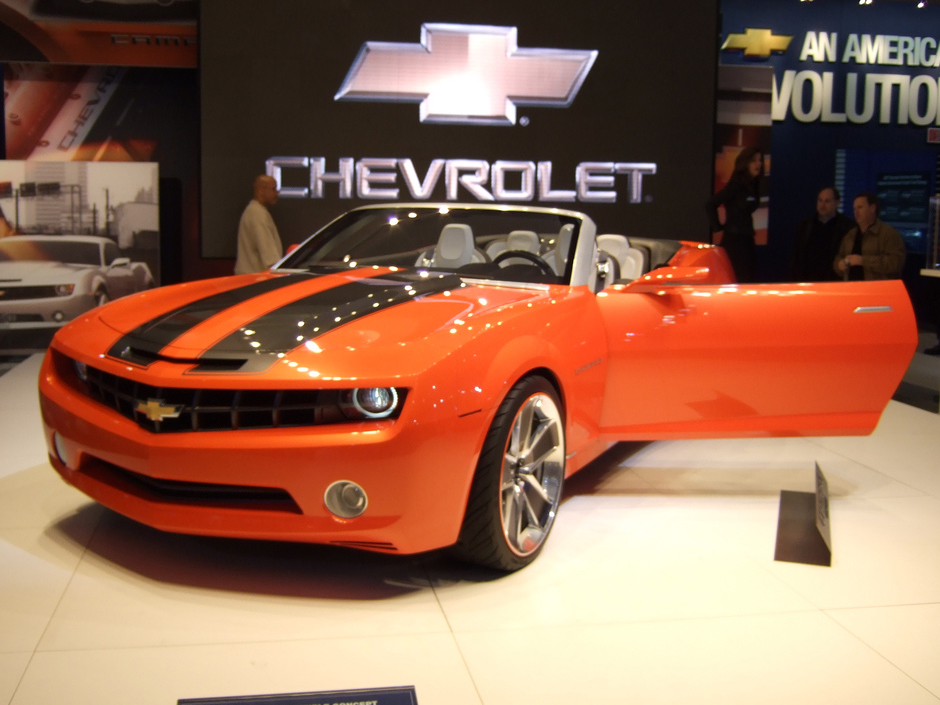
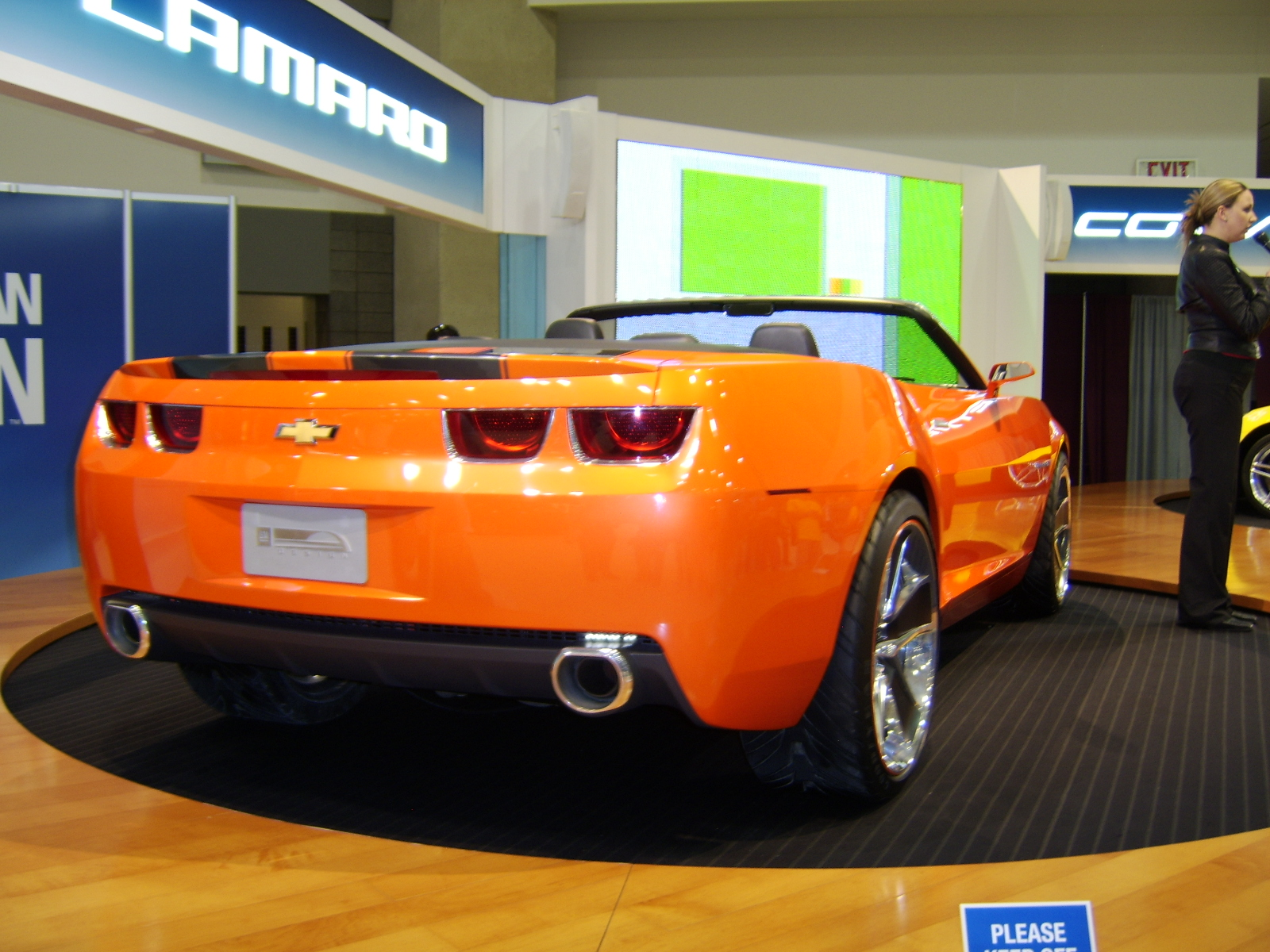
2007 Camaro Convertible Concept

The 2007 Camaro Convertible Concept was announced on January 6, 2007, at the 2007 North American International Auto Show. Early speculation on the existence of the car by many automotive publications proved to be true when an early embargo was broken on January 4, 2007.

There are differences between the coupe and convertible concepts beyond the roof and Hugger Orange pearl tri-coat paint job with a pair of dark gray racing stripes. Every exterior surface was changed from the door cut back. The rear fender lines dropped off from the horizontal surface to the vertical surface a couple of inches farther out than on the coupe to maintain visual proportions. The rear spoiler was also reshaped. The 21 in (53 cm) front and 22 in (56 cm) rear wheels were redesigned and a thin orange line was applied to the outer edge, a nod to the red striped tires popular on late 1960s muscle cars.

There were many interior changes that were incorporated into the new concept. The retro houndstooth-pattern seats of the coupe were replaced with modern leather and orange stitching. The metal finishes, accent panels, and seats were all in different colors. The rear seats were 6 in (15 cm) closer together to make room for the tonneau cover. The clarity of the circular gauges in square frames were improved by making the faces white with black chrome numbers and a red anodized needle. The deep-dish three-spoke steering wheel and four-pack gauge cluster were carried over from the coupe concept. Chrome seat-belt buckles were designed to look like the belt buckles in late 1960s GM automobiles. This reworked interior of the Camaro Convertible Concept was a very close representation of what would be seen in the production version of the vehicle.

=== SEMA ===
==== 2008 ====
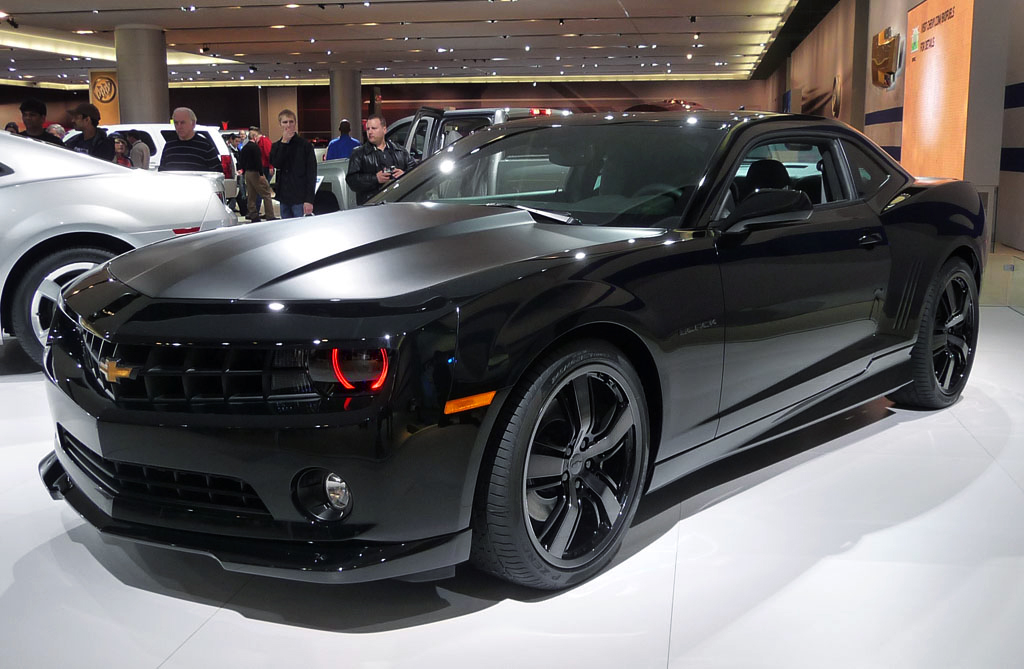
Camaro Black Concept at the 2008 SEMA show

General Motors showed several concept variants of the production version of the Camaro on November 3, 2008, at the 2008 SEMA show.

The Camaro Black Concept featured a matte black hood, tinted glass, HID headlamps with red "halo rings," a darker grille, dark-tinted taillight lenses, and 21 in (533 mm) wheels with a darker finish. The interior also featured the same black theme as the exterior. It was powered by the 304 hp (227 kW) 3.6 L (220 cu in) V6 engine.

Inspired by the COPO Camaros of the late 1960s, the Camaro LS7 Concept was built from the 2010 Camaro SS with the LS3 engine replaced with a GM Performance Parts 7.0-liter LS7 crate motor having a power output of 550 hp (410 kW). The heritage of COPO's performance history was reflected with the inclusion of a high-performance exhaust and improved headers, air intake system, and camshaft—all developed by GM Performance Parts. Other modifications included a Tremec six-speed manual transmission, Brembo brakes, Hurst short-throw shifter, 20-inch custom wheels, and a lowered ride height. The exterior of the car was finished in Victory Red with accents of matte black on the "LS7" badges, front grille slot, rear headlight panel, and hood. The LS7 logo was repeated in Victory Red on top of the hood cowl. The interior had a matching color scheme with red panel trim on the doors, dash, and gages. Gloss black replaced every trim that came in silver in the final production Camaros, such as on the steering wheel, shifter knob, vent trimmings, and center console clusters.

The Camaro Dale Earnhardt Jr. Concept was produced with input from NASCAR Race driver Dale Earnhardt Jr. The Camaro started in SS trim and was tuned to run on higher-octane E85 fuel. It featured a gray and white paint scheme with orange trim. Additional features included 21 in (533 mm) five-spoke wheels, a dovetail spoiler, an alternate grille, and other official GM accessory modifications.

==== 2009 ====
A customized Camaro was built by GM for TV presenter Jay Leno, and is powered by the 3.6 L (220 cu in) direct-injected V6 similar to the unit that resides in standard LS and LT models, but has an additional pair of Turbonetics T-3 turbochargers. The engine has a power output of 425 hp (317 kW) with the help of a custom air-to-air intercooler that feeds 7 pounds of boost pressure into the engine. The extra performance is added with virtually no penalty in fuel economy. Besides the power upgrades, the vehicle also gets an upgraded Centerforce clutch and pressure plate for the six-speed manual transmission, an upgraded Be-Cool radiator, Brembo 6-piston brake package, a Pedders coil-over lowering kit, and a bodykit that includes a new rear diffuser as well as a revised front fascia and hood with additional vents for the brakes and engine.

The Synergy Concept Camaro was one of two concepts that showcased GM accessories that could be applied to the Camaro, previewing a new Synergy Green production exterior color which featured the latest in Camaro appearance accessories offered through Chevrolet dealers in 2009 and demonstrated the personalization possibilities that were open to Camaro owners. The Synergy Concept included Cyber Grey rally hood and rear deck stripes, a new ground effects kit consisting of a new rear diffuser, a front spoiler, a new rear bumper with an integrated exhaust system, and a rear high wing. All accessories that were displayed on the concept Camaro were finished in the production Cyber Grey exterior color. The concept vehicle also included 21 in (530 mm) wheels with a black center finish and polished rim. The concept was further enhanced with a Pedders coil-over lowering kit and a set of large Brembo brakes. The interior is color-coordinated with Jet Black and Synergy Green accent stitching, piping, interior trim kit, and green ambient lighting that run along the door panels and speedometers. The production version of the concept Camaro, the Synergy Special Edition would eventually be made available from February 2010 through May 2010 in limited numbers.

Japanese models went on sale in February 2010 through May 2010.

The Camaro Chroma Concept is based on an LS3 SS/RS model in Summit White and uses a combination of accessory components that showcased future GM accessories for the Camaro which would become available during the 2011 model year. The Chroma concept was the preliminary design of what would become later known as the "Synergy Series Camaro" that would debut at the 2010 SEMA Show. The accessories package included a new silver stripe package, 21 in (530 mm) wheels with silver-painted spoke centers with a Victory Red stripe painted along the edge of the wheel, "Blade” rear spoiler, color-matching ground effects package, rear fender vent graphics, and "Heritage" front grille with body-color outer frame. The interior comes with black and gray leather seats which feature red accent stitching that is also applied to the steering wheel and shifter boot that is surrounding a Hurst short-throw shifter as well as an interior trim kit painted in Silver Ice that incorporates the door panels and dash trim. Mechanically, the car is equipped with a combination of General Motor Performance Parts off-road shorty headers, Pedders' suspension kit, off-road exhaust, and Brembo Calipers painted in Victory Red.

==== Camaro Dusk ====
The Camaro Dusk Concept offers a contemporary tuner aesthetic featuring an aggressive look, a lowered ride height, 21 in (530 mm) BBS wheels, the rear spoiler from an SS model and a custom ground effects package. The ground effects package includes a front splitter, rocker extensions, and a rear diffuser. The car is painted in Berlin Blue while the ground effects are painted a contrasting color. GM added a new exhaust system and Brembo brakes from a Camaro SS. The interior is trimmed in Jet Black and Sedona. Other interior features include footwell lighting and premium door sill plates. The concept also features advanced technology and premium audio options such as a Boston Acoustics sound system, WiFi connectivity, and a cradle for an iPhone.

Chevrolet launched a graphics campaign in October 2009 asking Camaro enthusiasts to vote for their favorite design from several accessory graphics packages. The top four designs were produced and brought to the SEMA Show. The Camaro Graphics Concept wore those designs on different days. When the convention ended, another round of voting would be conducted and the winner was considered for future production. Brent Dewar, vice president of Chevrolet, said that "Camaro has thousands of fans on the social media sites and that this is one way for the company to stay connected to its customers."

==== 2010 ====
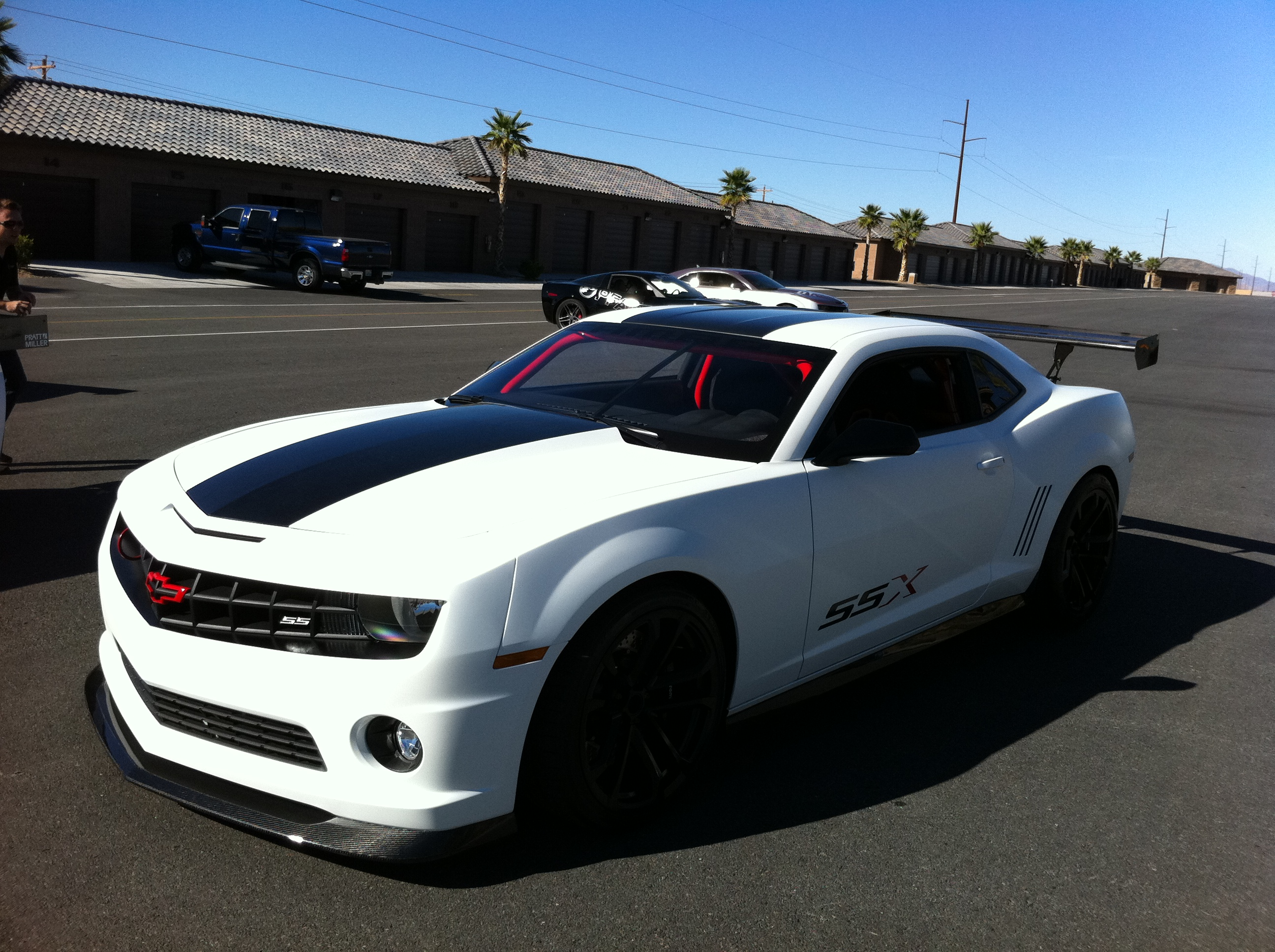
Chevrolet Camaro SSX

Unveiled at the 2010 SEMA show, the Camaro SSX concept car is a variant of the Camaro SS converted into a closed-course track car, built to showcase new performance parts. The car was developed with input from Pratt and Miller, Chevrolet's partner in Corvette Racing, and Riley Technologies using parts proven in the Grand Am racing series.

Changes over the standard Camaro SS included low-gloss Icy White Metallic body color with red accents and door graphics, carbon fiber hood, fenders, door and deck lid; exposed carbon fiber front splitter, rockers and adjustable rear wing; unique lower grille and brake ducts, removal of carpeting, sound deadening and rear seats; Ace suede-covered racing steering wheel and shifter, SCCA-approved roll cage and window net, racing driver's seat with five-point harness, racing pedals, fire suppression system, racing fuel cell, a video camera system mounted on the roll cage, the LS3 6.2 L V8 engine enhanced with Chevrolet Performance Parts' camshaft, cylinder heads and dry-sump oiling system; six-speed manual transmission equipped with a twin-disc clutch shared with the Corvette ZR1, low-restriction air induction and exhaust systems, 4-wheel disc racing braking system with six-piston front/four-piston rear calipers with drilled and slotted rotors, modified production suspension with Pfadt licensed components and 20-inch racing wheels and tires.

The car received two awards at SEMA: The SEMA Award: Hottest Car and the Gran Turismo Award: Best Domestic.

==== 2011 ====
The COPO Camaro Concept is a factory-built Stock Eliminator race car and the spiritual successor to the legendary special-order models from 1969, with provisions for two engine configurations (7.0 L LS7 or 5.3 L LS9), provisions for 3 transmission types (Powerglide two-speed automatic, 3-speed automatic, 5-speed manual), high-rise cowl-induction hood, custom Aeromotive fuel system with a fuel cell and integral high-pressure fuel pump, full chromoly roll cage, coil-over front suspension with Strange Engineering adjustable struts, custom rear suspension based on NHRA requirements (Strange Engineering shocks, Panhard bar and stabilizer bar), Strange Engineering S-9 solid rear axle (aluminum third member, 35-spline spool, 35-spline axles and 4.10 gear set), COPO-specific racing wheels, 29x9-inch rear radial racing slicks and 4.5x28x15-inch front tires, manual steering system, Strange Engineering lightweight racing brakes system with standard line lock, removal of sound deadening and power accessories, 2 racing bucket seats (and deletion of the rear seat), a safety harness for the driver, a competition floor shifter and Chevrolet Performance gauges by Auto Meter.

The Camaro Hot Wheels Concept is a concept vehicle based on the Camaro SS coupe with a Tremec TR-6060 six-speed manual transmission, inspired by the "Custom Camaro" 1/64-scale model that was part of the original Hot Wheels collection released in 1968. It was designed by General Motors' Design studio in Michigan and the Hot Wheels Design studio in California. Changes include Over Chrome Green body colour (created using Gold Touch Inc.'s Cosmichrome product) with ghosted Hot Wheels logo on the quarter panels, Satin black ground effects (splitter, rocker and rear fascia-side extensions), Satin black wheels with milled face and Torch Red stripe: 20x10-inch (front) and 20x11-inch (rear), ZL1 grille with Hot Wheels badging, Hot Wheels badge on the decklid, Euro-style taillamps with new inner smoked lens, Euro-style rear fascia with new diffuser and exhaust bezels, ZL1 rear spoiler, Chevrolet Accessories Modified Satin Black Stripe, black aluminum "CAMARO" fender badges with milled face, black aluminum hood insert with milled hood vent extractors, Chevrolet Accessories Synergy Series gill decals, Black leather-wrapped IP and door inserts with Torch Red accents, and cut-and-sew flames; Hot Wheels sill plates, Hot Wheels cut-and-sew embroidered logos in the front seatbacks, Chevrolet Accessories pedal kit, Chevrolet Accessories footwell and cup holder lighting (red), Brembo brakes: six-piston front with two-piece rotors and four-piston calipers, suspension lowering kit by Pedders Chevrolet Accessories strut tower brace, Chevrolet Accessories black engine cover, Chevrolet Accessories exhaust system.

The Camaro Red Zone Concept is a version of the 2012 Camaro designed by Adam Barry. It features a black convertible tonneau cover, Chevrolet Accessories 21x8.5-inch silver/polished-face wheels, silver heritage stripe, Chevrolet Accessories body-color grille, convertible wind screen, suspension lowering kit by Pedders, concept polished strut tower brace, concept "RS" underhood liner, Titanium leather interior with Silver Ice accents, Black soft instrument panel insert, Chevrolet Accessories Silver Ice door and instrument panel inserts and Chevrolet Accessories floor mats with silver "CAMARO" logos.

The Camaro Synergy Series Concept is a version of the Camaro with Silver Ice body color with black Synergy stripes on the hood, with decklid and "mail slot" decals with red line inserts; Synergy gill decals and no SS or RS exterior badges, Chevrolet Accessories body-color ground effects and grille, Chevrolet Accessories 21-inch wheels in black with red stripe, Suspension lowering kit by Pedders (Chevrolet Official Licensed Product), red Brembo brake calipers, Chevrolet Accessories red engine cover, Concept "SS" underhood liner, Concept polished strut tower brace, Chevrolet Accessories floor mats (ebony with red and "CAMARO" logo in silver), Chevrolet Accessories lighting kit (displayed in red), Hurst short-throw shifter, Black leather interior with red accent stitching on seats, console, doors, steering wheel and shifter boot; Silver Ice instrument panel and door inserts, Black leather instrument panel soft insert with red stitching, SS logo with red outline on the head restraints and Chevrolet Accessories pedal kit.

The Camaro 1LE Concept is a version of the Camaro featuring production components from both the Camaro SS and the (then forthcoming) Camaro ZL1, with Victory Red body color, flat black hood and hash mark extensions, satin black splitter, rocker panels, rear spoiler and outside mirrors; sport suspension featuring Magnetic Ride Control, electric power steering, six-speed manual close-ratio transmission, 20x10-inch (front) and 20x11-inch (rear) racing wheels (in satin black), Goodyear Eagle F1 Supercar G asymmetrical tires (from the ZL1), Brembo six-piston front calipers with two-piece front rotors and four-piston rear calipers (Chevrolet Official Licensed Product), dual exhaust outlets with ZL1-style active exhaust and diffuser, shock tower brace, Chevrolet Accessories red engine cover, Black leather interior with Light Stone stitching, Graphite Silver door and instrument panel inserts, ZL1 shifter with Light Stone stitching, ZL1 flat-bottom steering wheel and Chevrolet Accessories pedal kit.

Camaro ZL1 Carbon Concept is a version of Camaro ZL1 with Ashen Gray body colour, Chevrolet Accessories exposed-weave carbon fiber "Mohawk" hood insert, Carbon fiber rear spoiler with stainless-steel wicker bill, Carbon fiber inserts on the interior door and instrument panel, 20x10-inch (front) and 20x11-inch (rear) wheels in satin black with machined faces, Brembo six-piston front calipers with two-piece front rotors and four-piston rear calipers (Chevrolet Official Licensed Product), Magnetic Ride Control, dual exhaust outlets with active exhaust and diffuser, Jet Black leather interior with sueded microfiber seat inserts and Torch Red stitching, ZL1 short-throw shifter with suede and carbon fiber-trimmed shift knob and Suede-trimmed flat-bottom steering wheel and ZL1 pedals.

==== 2012 ====
Chevrolet built a special version of the Camaro ZL1 coupe designed in association with Chevrolet Design Manager Dave Ross for NASCAR driver Tony Stewart. It features a custom gray metallic body colour accented with tribal and Smoke graphics in flat red and silver pinstripes, tinted headlamp lenses with red halo lighting, custom wheels with a Piano Black finish and red accents, Jet Black leather seats with suede inserts and scarlet accent stitching, embroidered Tony Stewart signatures on the seats, suede leather door panel inserts and instrument panel wrapping with laser-etched details, Jet Black leather door armrests with French stitching and white piping, Jet Black suede leather-wrapped steering wheel with scarlet accent stitching, Piano Black trim plates and a custom gauge cluster bezel.

The Camaro ZL1 Touring Convertible concept is a Camaro ZL1 convertible with green exterior color, 10-spoke Chevrolet Accessories wheels with liquid metal finish and milled faces, windshield header frame, taillamp bezels and exterior badges with liquid metal finish; matte black splitter and rockers, matte black upper fascia blackout, polished shock tower brace under the hood, ebony leather seats with Mojave perforated leather inserts and light Mojave stitching, Mojave leather-wrapped armrests, leather shift knob and console lid with Mojave stitching, Chevrolet Accessories Ice Blue interior lighting kit, ZL1-logo premium floor mats and sill plates.

The Camaro Performance V8 concept is a black Camaro SS with Chevrolet Performance ZL1 rear differential kit, 5.1-ratio short-throw shifter, shock tower brace with white Camaro graphic, Camaro 1LE suspension kit, Camaro ZL1 brake conversion kit, concept dual-mode exhaust system, Camaro ZL1 rockers and rear lower diffuser, Camaro Dusk front splitter, upper front fascia blackout graphic, hood and decklid graphics in red metallic, Chevrolet Accessories black blade rear spoiler, heritage grille and 'gill' graphics, Chevrolet Accessories 20x10-inch (front) and 20x11-inch (rear) five-spoke black wheels with polished 'fangs', Camaro ZL1 black suede seat inserts with Jet Black leather seats; Torch Red stitching and carbon fiber-material bolsters, red suede stripe on the driver's seatback, Camaro ZL1 flat-bottom steering wheel with carbon fiber trim, Camaro ZL1 suede shift knob with 5.1 badge, leather carbon fiber-material-wrapped instrument panel and door inserts, suede-wrapped soft instrument panel insert, Chevrolet Accessories lighting package, pedal covers and Camaro-logo premium floor mats; Concept Chevrolet Performance embroidered console lid and sill plates and production RS gauge package.

The Camaro Performance V6 concept includes a 323 hp (241 kW) LFX V6 engine, ZL1 Brake Conversion Kit, Camaro 1LE suspension kit, rear differential from the Camaro 1LE, Summit White body colour, Chevrolet Performance shock tower brace, Camaro ZL1 dual-mode exhaust system and rear diffuser, Camaro convertible rear spoiler in matte black, Chevrolet Accessories heritage grille painted matte black, Camaro Dusk front splitter in matte black, upper front fascia blackout graphic, matte black hood wrap with exposed Summit White stripe, Chevrolet Accessories 20x10-inch (front) and 20x11-inch (rear) 10-spoke black wheels with milled faces, Summit White door panel and instrument panel inserts, Chevrolet Accessories lighting package, pedal covers and Camaro-logo premium floor mats; Concept Chevrolet Performance embroidered console lid and sill plates, Concept Chevrolet Performance logo on the instrument panel insert and production RS gauge package.

The Camaro SS 1LE package became available under the 2013 Chevrolet Performance Catalog.

=== Racing concepts ===
The Camaro GS Racecar Concept design was inspired by Mark Donohue's blue-and-yellow Trans Am Series Camaro. It features a carbon fiber hood, trunk lid, doors and fenders to keep weight down and is powered by an LS3 V8 engine mated to a Tremec TR-6060 six-speed manual transmission. Additional racing modifications included a 3 in (76 mm) exhaust with Coast Fab mufflers, C&R racing aluminum radiator, and coolers for the engine oil, transmission, and differential. It was designed for use in the KONI Challenge Series.

The concept vehicle went on sale by Mecum Auctions during the 2013 Monterey Car Week.

== Motorsports ==
Stevenson Motorsports entered two Camaros in the Continental Challenge Gran Sport class. They entered one Camaro in the 2009 race at Virginia International Raceway. It was driven by Jeff Bucknum and David Donohue, sons of Ronnie Bucknum and Mark Donohue. Ronnie and Mark were the drivers of the original Trans Am Camaro. John Stevenson confirmed during the Montreal round of the 2009 Rolex Sports Car Series season that Pratt & Miller are working on GT Camaros to replace the Pontiac GXP.R. Stevenson Motorsports will be entering Camaros in the 2010 Rolex Sports Car Series season. The drivers would be Andrew Davis, Robin Liddell, and Jan Magnussen for the #57 car and Mike Borkowski and Gunter Schaldach for the #97 car.

TC Motorsports entered two Camaros in the Continental Challenge for the 2010 season. Also entered is the aforementioned Sunoco Camaro, which debuted in the final round of the 2009 season.

NASCAR used the 5th Gen Camaro body in the NASCAR Xfinity Series from 2013 until 2017, before switching to a body that resembled the 6th Gen Camaro. The Camaro debuted in the then-called NASCAR Nationwide Series beginning in 2011, and it had success. They notably won a championship in 2014 with young talent, Chase Elliott.

The Camaro coupe started participating in the NASCAR Nationwide Series beginning in the 2013 season. The Camaro ZL1 started participating in the 2018 Monster Energy NASCAR Cup Series, replacing the Chevrolet SS.

== Sales ==
Year	Sales
2009	61,648
2010	81,299
2011	88,249
2012	84,391
2013	80,567
2014	86,297
2015	77,502

== Awards and recognition ==
- Official vehicle of the 2008, 2010, and 2011 SEMA show.
- Vehicles that will redefine the auto industry in the next year, Detroit Free Press
- Official Pace Car of the 2009 Daytona 500
- Official Pace Car of the Texas Motor Speedway April 2010 O'Reilly 300
- Official Pace Car of the 2011 Daytona 500
- Official Pace Car of the 2009 Indianapolis 500
- Official Pace Car of the 2010 Indianapolis 500
- Official Pace Car of the 2011 Indianapolis 500
- Official Pace Car of the 2011 Samsung Mobile 500
- Official Pace Car of the 2009 Dickies 500
- Official Pace Car of the 2009 Coke Zero 400
- Official Pace Car of the 2010 Coke Zero 400
- 2010 All Star, Automobile Magazine
- 2010 Best Resale Value: Sports Car, Kiplinger
- 2010 Best Resale Value Award, Kelly Blue Book
- Top 20 Most-Researched New Vehicles of 2009, Kelly Blue Book
- World Car Design of the Year, 2010, World Car of the Year Awards
- 2010 Interior of the Year (sports car), Ward's
- Best Buy, Consumers Digest
- 2010 Drivers' Choice, Motor Trend
- Internet Car and Truck of the Year
- 2010 Launch Breakthrough Award, Edmunds
