= San Vito S1 =

Overview
- Manufacturer: San Vito
- Model years: 2008 – 2017
- Assembly: Aricanduva, São Paulo, Brasil

Body and chassis
- Class: Sports car
- Body style: 2-door coupe
- Layout: Longitudinal RMR layout
- Related: Mazda MX-5

Powertrain
- Engine: VW L4 1800 cc

Dimensions
- Wheelbase: 85.0 in (2,160 mm)
- Length: 147.2 in (3,740 mm)
- Width: 66.9 in (1,700 mm)
- Height: 1,150 mm (45.3 in)
- Curb weight: 930 kg (2,050 lb)

The San Vito S1 is a Brazilian sport car made by San Vito, a brand from "Personal Parts". The car uses ethanol as fuel.

== Design and development ==
Vito Simone studied architecture in 1974 and he was already focused on cars, so he made some models to scale. Later he worked for Ford Motor Company in design areas for 20 years. When he retired from Ford in 1996, he founded the company "Personal Parts" which is currently the largest manufacturer of aerodynamic fiberglass kits in Brazil. Not satisfied with it, in 2005 he started working on the ISOR project, in order to create a 100% Brazilian made sports car, this project was presented in 2008 as San Vito S1.

It is a small car, 3.74 m long, 1.70 m wide and 1.15 m high. It has a tubular chassis with round longitudinal sections and rectangular cross sections, weighs 930 kg (2,050 lb) and is powered by a Volkswagen / Audi origin engine mounted in the rear and modified to run only with ethanol that produces 150 hp (112 kW).

The car has a fuel consumption of 6 km / l (14.1 MPG) in the city and 8 km / l (18.8 MPG) on the road, accelerates from 0 to 100 km / h in 6.5 seconds and reaches a top speed of 220 km/h (137 mph).

=== Specifications ===
According to the manufacturer

Model	Dimensions	Weight	Engine	Power	Tyres	Power/Weight	Acceleration 0–100 km/h (0-62 mph)	Top Speed
San Vito S1	3740/1700/1150/2160	930 kg (2,050 lb)	Rear longitudinal L4 1800 cc	150 hp (112 kW) @ 7000 rpm	Front:225 / 40 2R 18; Rear:235 / 40 2R 18	161.2 HP/ton	6.5 s	220 km/h (137 mph)

== Bibliography ==
- Ernesto Roy; Hector de Losada (2015). Magazine:Auto Catálogo. Motorpress Televisa.
