= Kenichi Yamamoto (engineer) =

Japanese mechanical engineer and business executive (1922–2017)

- Born: 16 September 1922; Kumamoto Prefecture
- Died: 20 December 2017 (aged 95); Kanagawa Prefecture
- Education: Tokyo Imperial University
- Occupations: mechanical engineer, business executive
- Years active: 1946–1992
- Employer: Mazda
- Known for: Development of Mazda Wankel engine

Kenichi Yamamoto (山本健一, Yamamoto Kenichi; 16 September 1922 – 20 December 2017) was a Japanese mechanical engineer and business executive. He supervised the development of the Mazda Wankel rotary combustion engine, and served as Mazda's President (1984–1987) and Chairman (1987–1992).

== Early life ==
Yamamoto was born in Kumamoto Prefecture on 16 September 1922, and subsequently moved to Hiroshima with his family. In 1944, he graduated with a mechanical engineering degree from the Tokyo Imperial University (now University of Tokyo).

He served in the Imperial Japanese Navy during World War II. The Bombing of Hiroshima destroyed his family's home and killed his sister. After the end of the war, he moved to Hiroshima to support his parents.

== Career ==
In 1946, Yamamoto joined Toyo Kogyo (later Mazda) as an assembly line worker. Initially, he worked at the company's factory outside Hiroshima, which produced transmissions for three-wheeled trucks. A year and a half after joining the company, he moved to engine design, and rose to a supervisor role. At the age of 25, he designed the company's first overhead valve engine.

=== Supervisor role ===
Around 1961, the company's president appointed Yamamoto as the supervisor of a team tasked with producing a commercial model of the Wankel engine (a rotary combustion engine) invented by the German engineer Felix Wankel and licensed to Mazda. Yamamoto's team of 47 engineers were nicknamed "47 Ronin" for their loyalty and perseverance to the company. At that time, Japan's Ministry of International Trade and Industry was pressuring smaller automobile manufacturers like Toyo Kogyo to merge with the larger companies (Toyota, Nissan and Isuzu) to become more competitive. The success of an improved engine would allow Toyo Kogyo to remain independent.

Yamamoto's team produced the Mazda Wankel engine which powered the Mazda Cosmo introduced at the Tokyo Motor Show in 1963. Subsequently, the engine was mass-produced and featured in the company's vehicles. However, its high fuel consumption led to declining sales and near-bankruptcy for the company during the oil crisis of early 1970s.

In 1974, Yamamoto was appointed to lead a project to come up with fuel-saving innovations. He decided not to abandon the Mazda Wankel engine project, insisting that it differentiated the company from its competitors. The project produced an engine with significant improvement in fuel economy. The engine was featured in the immensely successful Mazda RX-7 model, which Yamamoto helped design. He also supervised the design teams for Mazda 626 and Mazda GLC/323: the three models played an important role in the company's financial turnaround.

=== Management and executive roles ===
Subsequently, Yamamoto rose to management cadre and became the company's head of research and development. In 1978, motoring journalist Bob Hall suggested that the company build a cheap two-seater roadster. In 1981, Hall, who now worked as product planner for the company in Southern California, once again pitched his idea to Yamamoto. Later, Yamamoto approved the idea, and the initiative resulted in the successful MX-5 Miata model.

On 30 November 1984, Yamamoto became the President of the company (now called Mazda). He recommended the company's board to approve mass production of MX-5 Miata. He expanded Mazda's presence in the United States, starting with the Flat Rock Assembly Plant in Michigan, in 1985. In 1987, Yamamoto became the company's Chairman, and served in that capacity until he stepped down in 1992.

He died on 20 December 2017 in Kanagawa Prefecture at the age of 95.
