= 2015 Pirelli World Challenge =

Seasons
- ← 2014 2016 →

The 2015 Pirelli World Challenge season was the 26th running of the Sports Car Club of America's World Challenge series. It introduced a new all-Porsche "GT Cup" race group. Johnny O'Connell was the defending champion in the highest class, the GT class.

== Schedule ==
The season comprises 12 rounds, with several rounds in support of the IndyCar Series and the United SportsCar Championship, as well as supporting the NASCAR Canadian Tire Series and the NASCAR Xfinity Series.

Round	Date	Event	Circuit	Location	Classes	Supporting
1	March 6–8	Nissan Grand Prix of Texas	Circuit of the Americas	Austin, Texas	GT/GTA/GT Cup (x2); GTS (x2); TC/TCA/TCB (x3)	Headline
2	March 27–29	Cadillac Grand Prix of St. Petersburg	Streets of St. Petersburg	St. Petersburg, Florida	GT/GTA/GT Cup (x2); GTS (x2)	IndyCar Series
3	April 17–19	Roar By The Shore presented by Replay XD	Streets of Long Beach	Long Beach, California	GT/GTA/GT Cup†	IndyCar Series / United SportsCar Championship
4	April 24–26	MOMO Grand Prix at Barber	Barber Motorsports Park	Birmingham, Alabama	GT/GTA/GT Cup† (x2); GTS (x2)	IndyCar Series
5	May 15–17	Remo Ferri Group Canadian Grand Prix	Canadian Tire Motorsport Park	Bowmanville, Ontario	GT/GTA/GT Cup (x2); GTS (x2); TC/TCA/TCB (x3)	NASCAR Canadian Tire Series
6	May 29–31	Cadillac V-Series Challenge	The Raceway on Belle Isle	Detroit, Michigan	GT/GTA (x2)	IndyCar Series / United SportsCar Championship
7	June 26–28	DeVilbiss Grand Prix at Road America	Road America	Elkhart Lake, Wisconsin	GT/GTA/GT Cup (x2); GTS (x2); TC/TCA/TCB (x3)	Headline
8	July 31 – August 2	StopTech Grand Prix presented by MOMO	Mid-Ohio Sports Car Course	Lexington, Ohio	GT/GTA/GT Cup (x2); GTS (x2)	IndyCar Series
9	August 14–16	OPTIMA Grand Prix presented by MOMO	Mid-Ohio Sports Car Course	Lexington, Ohio	TC/TCA/TCB (x3)	NASCAR Xfinity Series
10	August 21–23	Ford Grand Prix at Miller by VP Fuels	Miller Motorsports Park	Tooele, Utah	GT/GTA/GT Cup (x2); GTS (x2); TC/TCA/TCB (x3)	Headline
11	August 28–30	Grand Prix of Sonoma presented by Kia	Sonoma Raceway	Sonoma, California	GT/GTA/GT Cup (x2); GTS (x2)	IndyCar Series
12	September 11–13	Mazda Raceway Grand Prix by Cadillac	Mazda Raceway Laguna Seca	Monterey, California	GT/GTA/GT Cup; GTS; TC/TCA/TCB (x3)	Headline

†The round at Long Beach was capped to 40 cars, with only 10 GT-Cup cars guaranteed a place. Any GT-Cup entries that were not able to contest the Long Beach round were eligible for double points at Barber Motorsports Park.

== News ==
The second race at Belle Isle on May 31 was cancelled on safety grounds due to inclement weather, which caused reduced track visibility. An additional race was held at Road America to replace the round at Detroit.

== Entry list ==
=== GT/GTA ===
Constructor	Team	Car	No.	Driver	Rounds
Acura	(United States) RealTime R&L	TLX-GT	42	(United States) Peter Cunningham	All
Acura	(United States) RealTime R&L	TLX-GT	43	(United States) Ryan Eversley	All
Aston Martin	(Mexico) De La Torre Racing	V12 Vantage GT3	4	(Mexico) Jorge De La Torre	1, 4, 7–8, 10, 12
Aston Martin	(United States) TRG-AMR	V12 Vantage GT3	7	(Denmark) Christina Nielsen (R)	1–6, 8, 10–12
Aston Martin	(United States) TRG-AMR	V12 Vantage GT3	09	(United States) Mark McKenzie	1
Aston Martin	(United States) LG Motorsports	V12 Vantage GT3	28	(United States) Lou Gigliotti	1, 3, 8
Audi	(United States) CRP Racing	R8 LMS ultra	2	(United States) Mike Skeen	All
Audi	(United States) Global Motorsports Group	R8 LMS ultra	14	(United States) James Sofronas	1–4, 7–8, 10, 12
Audi	(United States) Global Motorsports Group	R8 LMS ultra	21	(United States) Madison Snow	1
Audi	(United States) Global Motorsports Group	R8 LMS ultra	21	(United States) David Welch	3, 6, 8
Audi	(United States) Global Motorsports Group	R8 LMS ultra	44	(United States) Brent Holden	2–3, 8, 10
Audi	(United States) Global Motorsports Group	R8 LMS ultra	76	(United States) Alex Welch	1, 7, 12
Audi	(United States) Stephen Cameron Racing	R8 LMS ultra	19	(United States) Drew Regitz	All
Audi	(United States) M1 Racing	R8 LMS ultra	23	(United States) Guy Cosmo	1
Audi	(United States) M1 Racing	R8 LMS ultra	23	(United States) Walt Bowlin	2, 4, 7
Audi	(United States) JCR Motorsports	R8 LMS ultra	99	(United States) Jeff Courtney	1–5, 7–8
Bentley	(United Kingdom) Bentley Team Dyson Racing	Continental GT3	16	(United States) Chris Dyson	All
Bentley	(United Kingdom) Bentley Team Dyson Racing	Continental GT3	20	(United States) Butch Leitzinger	1–8
Bentley	(United Kingdom) Bentley Team Dyson Racing	Continental GT3	20	(United Kingdom) Guy Smith	10–12
BMW	(United States) Turner Motorsport	Z4 GT3	32	(United States) Bret Curtis	1–6, 8, 10–12
BMW	(United States) Turner Motorsport	Z4 GT3	95	(United States) Bill Ziegler	1–8, 10–11
BMW	(United States) Turner Motorsport	Z4 GT3	95	(United States) Dane Cameron	12
Cadillac	(United States) Cadillac Racing	ATS-V.R GT3	3	(United States) Johnny O'Connell	All
Cadillac	(United States) Cadillac Racing	ATS-V.R GT3	8	(United Kingdom) Andy Pilgrim	All
Dodge	(United States) Black Swan Racing	Viper GT3-R	54	(United States) Tim Pappas	3–8, 12
Dodge	(United States) Lone Star Racing	Viper GT3-R	80	(United States) Dan Knox	1–8
Ferrari	(United States) Scuderia Corsa	458 Italia GT3	07	(Mexico) Martin Fuentes	All
Ferrari	(United States) Scuderia Corsa	458 Italia GT3	64	(United States) Duncan Ende	All
Ferrari	(United States) Scuderia Corsa	458 Italia GT3	65	(United States) Mike Hedlund	1–3, 5, 8, 11–12
Ferrari	(United States) NGT Motorsport	458 Italia GT3	29	(United States) Eduardo Cisneros (R)	7–8, 10–11
Ferrari	(United States) NGT Motorsport	458 Italia GT3	29	(Italy) Alessandro Balzan	12
Ferrari	(United States) NGT Motorsport	458 Italia GT3	30	(Venezuela) Henrique Cisneros	1–8, 10–11
Ferrari	(United States) NGT Motorsport	458 Italia GT3	30	(Italy) Alessandro Pier Guidi	12
Ferrari	(Canada) R. Ferri Motorsports	458 Italia GT3	61	(Monaco) Olivier Beretta	All
Ferrari	(United States) Risi Competizione	458 Italia GT3	62	(Mexico) Ricardo Pérez (R)	1
Ferrari	(United States) Risi Competizione	458 Italia GT3	62	(Canada) Marc Muzzo	5
Lamborghini	(Germany) Blancpain Racing	Gallardo R-EX	0	(Brazil) Marcelo Hahn	2
Lamborghini	(Germany) Blancpain Racing	Gallardo GT3 FL2	25	(Netherlands) Nick Catsburg	1–2, 4, 6, 10
Lamborghini	(Germany) Blancpain Racing	Gallardo GT3 FL2	25	(Czech Republic) Tomáš Enge	7
Lamborghini	(Germany) Blancpain Racing	Gallardo R-EX	25	(United States) Austin Cindric	8
Lamborghini	(Germany) Blancpain Racing	Gallardo R-EX	25	(Netherlands) Nick Catsburg	12
Lamborghini	(Germany) Blancpain Racing	Gallardo GT3 FL2	37	(Germany) Maximilian Vöelker	1–2
Lamborghini	(Germany) Blancpain Racing	Gallardo R-EX	55	(France) Henry Hassid	10
McLaren	(United States) K-PAX Racing	650S GT3	6	(United States) Robert Thorne	All
McLaren	(United States) K-PAX Racing	650S GT3	9	(France) Kévin Estre	All
Mercedes-Benz	(United States) DragonSpeed	SLS AMG GT3	08	(United States) Eric Lux	All
Mercedes-Benz	(United States) DragonSpeed	SLS AMG GT3	10	(Sweden) Henrik Hedman	1–5, 8, 11–12
Mercedes-Benz	(United States) DragonSpeed	SLS AMG GT3	66	(United States) Frankie Montecalvo	All
Mercedes-Benz	(United States) Black Swan Racing	SLS AMG GT3	54	(United States) Tim Pappas	1–2
Nissan	(United States) AE Replay XD Nissan GT Academy	GT-R GT3	05	(United States) Bryan Heitkotter	1–8
Nissan	(United States) AE Replay XD Nissan GT Academy	GT-R GT3	05	(United States) Bryan Heitkotter	10–12
Nissan	(United States) AE Replay XD Nissan GT Academy	GT-R GT3	33	(Australia) J. D. Davison	All
Porsche	(United States) EFFORT Racing	911 GT3 R	31	(United Kingdom) Ryan Dalziel	1–5, 7–8, 10, 12
Porsche	(United States) EFFORT Racing	911 GT3 R	31	(Netherlands) Renger van der Zande	6, 11
Porsche	(United States) EFFORT Racing	911 GT3 R	41	(United States) Michael Lewis (R)	1–3
Porsche	(United States) EFFORT Racing	911 GT3 R	41	(United States) Michael Lewis (R)	4–8, 10–12
Porsche	(United States) Autometrics Motorsports	911 GT3 R	90	(United States) Joseph Toussaint (R)	1, 4, 8

Colour	Class
	GT
	GTA

=== GT Cup ===
Every driver participates in a Porsche 911 GT3 Cup.

Team	No.	Driver	Rounds
(United States) TruSpeed Autosport	02	(United States) Sloan Urry	All
(United States) TruSpeed Autosport	18	(United States) Phil Fogg Jr.	1–5, 10–12
(United States) TruSpeed Autosport	18	(United States) Brett Sandberg	7–8
(United States) Porsche of Bucks County	11	(United States) Colin Thompson	All
(United States) ANSA Motorsports	13	(United States) Lorenzo Trefethen (R)	All
(United States) Global Motorsports Group	17	(United States) Alec Udell	1–2, 4, 7–8, 10–12
(United States) NGT Motorsport	29	(United States) Eduardo Cisneros (R)	1–5
(United States) Wright Motorsports	60	(Mexico) Santiago Creel (R)	1
(United States) Phoenix American Motorsports	77	(United States) Preston Calvert (R)	All
(United States) DragonSpeed	81	(Puerto Rico) Victor Gomez (R)	All
(United States) Landry Racing	97	(United States) Mitch Landry	All

=== GTS ===
Constructor	Team	Car	No.	Driver	Rounds
Aston Martin	(United States) TRG-AMR	Vantage GT4	06	(United States) Jeff Huber	11–12
Aston Martin	(United States) TRG-AMR	Vantage GT4	07	(United States) Kris Wilson	1–2, 4, 8, 11–12
Aston Martin	(United States) TRG-AMR	Vantage GT4	07	(Canada) Max Riddle	5
Aston Martin	(United States) TRG-AMR	Vantage GT4	09	(United States) Derek DeBoer	1–2, 4, 11
Aston Martin	(United States) TRG-AMR	Vantage GT4	13	(Germany) Peter Ludwig	11
Aston Martin	(United States) TRG-AMR	Vantage GT4	75	(United States) Jason Alexandridis	11
Aston Martin	(United States) LG Motorsports	Vantage GT4	28	(United States) Lou Gigliotti	1–2, 4–5, 7–8, 10, 12
Aston Martin	(United States) LG Motorsports	Vantage GT4	29	(United States) Bryan Leonard	4, 10
Aston Martin	(United States) Stephen Cameron Racing	Vantage GT4	34	(United States) Nick Esayian	5, 7–8, 10–12
Aston Martin	(United States) Klenin Performance Racing	Vantage GT4	62	(United States) Mark Klenin	All
Audi	(Canada) Compass360 Racing	TT-RS	78	(United States) Paul Holton	11–12
Chevrolet	(United States) Blackdog Speed Shop	Camaro Z28	1	(United States) Lawson Aschenbach	4
Chevrolet	(United States) Blackdog Speed Shop	Camaro Z28	10	(United States) Michael Cooper	All
Chevrolet	(United States) Blackdog Speed Shop	Camaro Z28	11	(United States) Tony Gaples	1–2, 5, 7–8, 10–12
Chevrolet	(United States) BestIT Racing	Camaro	20	(United States) Andy Lee	All
Chevrolet	(United States) BestIT Racing	Camaro	40	(United States) Geoff Reeves	1
Chevrolet	(United States) BestIT Racing	Camaro Z28	40	(United States) Geoff Reeves	2, 4, 11–12
Ford	(United States) Phoenix American Motorsports	Mustang Boss 302	32	(United States) Andrew Aquilante	All
Ford	(United States) Phoenix American Motorsports	Mustang Boss 302	35	(United States) Preston Calvert (R)	All
Ford	(United States) Phoenix American Motorsports	Mustang Boss 302	37	(United States) Kurt Rezzetano	All
Ford	(United States) Rehagen Racing	Mustang Boss 302	14	(United States) Nathan Stacy	8, 10–12
Ford	(United States) Rehagen Racing	Mustang Boss 302	33	(United States) Dan Martinson (R)	1–2, 4–5, 7–8
Ford	(United States) Rehagen Racing	Mustang Boss 302	50	(United States) Dean Martin	All
Ford	(United States) Stephen Cameron Racing	Mustang Boss 302	34	(United States) Nick Esayian	1–2, 4
Ford	(United States) 3R Racing	Mustang Boss 302	51	(United States) Nathan Stacy	4, 7
Ford	(United States) 3R Racing	Mustang Boss 302	51	(United States) Ray Mason	8
Ford	(United States) Roush Road Racing	Mustang Boss 302	60	(United States) Jack Roush Jr.	1–2, 4–5, 7–8, 10, 12
Ford	(United States) Roush Road Racing	Mustang Boss 302	68	(United States) Joey Atterbury	7
Ford	(United States) Roush Road Racing	Mustang Boss 302	68	(United States) Brandon Gdovic	8
Ford	(United States) DWW Motorsports	Mustang Boss 302	87	(United States) Spencer Pumpelly	2, 4
Hyundai	(United States) GAINSCO/Bob Stallings Racing	Genesis Coupe	99	(United States) Jeff Harrison	11
Hyundai	(United States) GAINSCO/Bob Stallings Racing	Genesis Coupe	99	(United States) Jon Fogarty	12
Kia	(United States) Kia Racing/Kinetic Motorsports	Optima	36	(United Kingdom) Ben Clucas	All
Kia	(United States) Kia Racing/Kinetic Motorsports	Optima	38	(Canada) Mark Wilkins	All
Lotus	(United States) VSA Motorsports	Evora GT4	44	(United States) Kevin Marshall	11–12
Maserati	(Italy) Maserati	GranTurismo MC	21	(United States) Vafa Kordestani	12
Maserati	(Italy) Maserati	GranTurismo MC	24	(United States) Patrick Byrne	12
Maserati	(Italy) Maserati	GranTurismo MC	26	(United Kingdom) Freddie Hunt	12
Maserati	(Italy) Maserati	GranTurismo MC	27	(United States) Derek Hill	12
Maserati	(Italy) Maserati	GranTurismo MC	46	(United States) Nick Mancuso	7
Maserati	(Italy) Maserati	GranTurismo MC	47	(Canada) Gianmarco Raimondo	7
Maserati	(Italy) Maserati	GranTurismo MC	66	(United States) Jeff Courtney	12
Nissan	(United States) Skullcandy Team Nissan	370Z	23	(Bulgaria) Vesko Kozarov	1, 10, 12
Nissan	(United States) Skullcandy Team Nissan	370Z	23	(United States) Nick Hammann	11
Porsche	(United States) Racing for Children's	911 Carrera	4	(United States) Clint Guthrie	4 (Race 1)
Porsche	(United States) Racing for Children's	911 Carrera	4	(United States) Brandon Davis	4 (Race 2)
Porsche	(United States) Bilt Racing Service	Cayman S	16	(United States) John Allen (R)	4, 7, 10–11
Porsche	(United States) GTSport Racing	Cayman S	72	(United States) Buz McCall	All
Porsche	(United States) GTSport Racing	Cayman S	73	(United States) Jack Baldwin	All

=== TC/TCA/TCB ===
Constructor	Team	Car	No.	Driver	Rounds
BMW	(United States) Classic BMW Motorsports	Z4	24	(United States) Toby Grahovec	7, 9
Chevrolet	(United States) Hack Racing	Sonic	2	(United States) Van Svenson (R)	All
Chevrolet	(United States) Tech Sport Racing	Sonic	25	(Denmark) Johan Schwartz	All
Ford	(United States) Steadfast Motorsports	Fiesta	27	(United States) Marc Sherrin (R)	All
Ford	(United States) Phoenix American Motorsports	Mustang V6	32	(United States) Andrew Aquilante	1
Ford	(United States) Ian Lacy Racing	Mustang V6	43	(United States) Ian Lacy	1
Ford	(United States) Ian Lacy Racing	Mustang V6	43	(United States) Steve Burns (R)	7, 10, 12
Ford	(United States) GSpeed	Fiesta	63	(United States) Jeremy Rohan (R)	1
Ford	(United States) Steadfast Motorsports	Fiesta	63	(United States) Matt Travis	12
Honda	(United States) Mincey Racing	Fit	4	(United States) Timothy Mincey Sr. (R)	1
Honda	(United States) Mincey Racing	Civic Si	4	(United States) Timothy Mincey Sr. (R)	5
Honda	(United States) NDP Motorsports	Civic Si	5	(United States) Neal de Paz (R)	1 (Race 1)
Honda	(United States) NDP Motorsports	Civic Si	5	(Colombia) Felipe Merjech	1 (Race 2), 5 (Races 1 and 3)
Honda	(United States) NDP Motorsports	Civic Si	5	(Colombia) Juan Carlos Casadiego	1 (Race 3), 5 (Race 2)
Honda	(United States) Drive4Diabetes/Garrett Racing	Civic Si	11	(Canada) Chase Pelletier	7, 9 (Race 3), 10, 12
Honda	(United States) Drive4Diabetes/Garrett Racing	Civic Si	11	(United States) Jon Miller	9 (Races 1 and 2)
Honda	(United States) Drive4Diabetes/Garrett Racing	Fit	12	(United States) Steve Kohli	7
Honda	(United States) Tech Sport Racing	Fit	23	(United States) Yiannis Tsiounis	9
Honda	(Canada) Team Ost Racing	Civic Si	39	(Canada) Patrick Seguin	9–10, 12
Honda	(United States) Branden Peterson Racing	Civic Si	49	(Canada) Patrick Seguin	1, 5, 7
Honda	(United States) Racing.ca	Fit	58	(Canada) Glenn Nixon	7, 9–10, 12
Honda	(United States) Shea Racing	Fit	66	(United States) Jay Salinsky	1, 9, 12
Honda	(United States) Shea Racing	Fit	66	(Canada) Randy Smith	5, 7
Honda	(United States) Shea Racing	Fit	66	(United States) Ted Hough	10
Honda	(United States) Shea Racing	Civic Si	67	(United States) Shea Holbrook	1, 5
Honda	(United States) Shea Racing	Civic Si	67	(United States) Steve Kohli	9–10
Honda	(United States) Shea Racing	Civic Si	67	(United States) Andrew Rains (R)	12
Honda	(United States) CNC Racing	S2000	68	(United States) Tommy Chen	12
Honda	(Canada) Compass360 Racing	Civic Si	71	(United States) Paul Holton	1 (Races 1 and 2), 5, 12
Honda	(Canada) Compass360 Racing	Civic Si	71	(Canada) Karl Thomson	1 (Race 3)
Honda	(Canada) Compass360 Racing	Civic Si	71	(United States) Ron Yarab	7, 9–10
Honda	(Canada) Compass360 Racing	Civic Si	72	(United States) Emilee Tominovich (R)	All
Honda	(United States) Honda Performance Development	Civic Si	70	(United States) Paul Whiting	10, 12
Honda	(United States) Honda Performance Development	Fit	90	(United States) Kevin Boehm	9 (Race 1)
Honda	(United States) Honda Performance Development	Fit	90	(United States) Andrew Salzano	9 (Race 2)
Honda	(United States) Honda Performance Development	Fit	90	(United States) Jeff Barrow	9 (Race 3)
Honda	(United States) Honda Motorsports Alabama	Accord	93	(United States) Paul Street (R)	1, 7, 9, 12
Honda	(United States) TOMO Racing	Fit	94	(United States) Tom O'Gorman (R)	9, 12
Hyundai	(United States) GenRacer	Genesis Coupe	78	(United States) Jeff Ricca	7, 9
Kia	(United States) Kinetic Motorsports	Forte Koup	34	(United States) Kris Wright (R)	All
Kia	(United States) Kinetic Motorsports	Forte Koup	36	(United States) Jason Wolfe	All
Kia	(United States) Kinetic Motorsports	Forte Koup	38	(Canada) Samantha Tan (R)	All
Mazda	(United States) Jeff Andretti Motorsports	Demio	02	(United States) Cameron Parsons	12
Mazda	(United States) Breathless Performance	Demio	9	(United States) Chris Holter	1
Mazda	(United States) Breathless Performance	MX-5	98	(United States) Ernie Francis Jr.	All
Mazda	(United States) Hale Motorsports	MX-5	17	(United States) Randy Hale	1, 5, 7, 12
Mazda	(United States) Tech Sport Racing	RX-8	22	(United States) Kevin Anderson	1, 5, 7, 9 (Race 3), 10, 12
Mazda	(United States) Tech Sport Racing	RX-8	23	(United States) Robby Foley (R)	1
Mazda	(United States) Tech Sport Racing	RX-8	23	(United States) Elivan Goulart	5
Mazda	(United States) Tech Sport Racing	RX-8	23	(United States) Gino Carini	7, 12
Mazda	(United States) Tech Sport Racing	RX-8	23	(United States) Yiannis Tsiounis	9 (Race 1)
Mazda	(United States) Tech Sport Racing	RX-8	23	(United States) Kevin Anderson	9 (Race 2)
Mazda	(United States) Tech Sport Racing	RX-8	23	(United States) Jason Saini	10
Mazda	(United States) Eastex Motorsports	MX-5	33	(United States) Adam Poland	All
Mazda	(United States) Corksport	Demio	47	(United States) Joey Jordan	10, 12
Mazda	(United States) BERG Racing	MX-5	50	(United States) Dinah Weisberg (R)	1, 5, 7
Mazda	(United States) BERG Racing	MX-5	50	(United States) John Weisberg	9–10, 12
Mazda	(United States) Steve Bottom Racing	MX-5	52	(United States) Steve Bottom	12
Mazda	(United States) Black Armor Helmets	Demio	55	(United States) James Wilson	1, 7, 12
Mazda	(United States) Black Armor Helmets	Demio	95	(United States) Steve Taake	1, 12
Mazda	(United States) Snader Racing	MX-5	64	(United States) Austin Snader	All
Mazda	(United States) Outlier Racing	RX-8	99	(United States) Brian Lift (R)	12
Mini	(United States) Breathless Performance	Cooper	7	(United States) Jason Fichter	All
Mini	(Canada) P. J. Groenke Racing	Cooper	8	(Canada) P. J. Groenke	All
Mini	(United States) Indian Summer Racing	Cooper	30	(United States) Travis W. Washay (R)	5, 7
Mini	(United States) Indian Summer Racing	Cooper	51	(United States) Mac Korince (R)	5
Mini	(United States) Shea Racing	Cooper	48	(United States) Tom Noble	1, 5, 7, 10, 12
Mini	(United States) Shea Racing	Cooper	48	(United States) Nick Lougee	9
Mini	(United States) Racing.ca	Cooper	57	(Canada) Andrei Kisel	All
Mini	(United States) Racing.ca	Cooper	58	(Canada) Glenn Nixon	1, 5
Mini	(United States) Racing.ca	Cooper	59	(Canada) Wei Lu (R)	1, 5, 9–10
Mini	(United States) Racing.ca	Cooper	59	(Canada) Nic Duynstee	7, 12
Nissan	(United States) Skullcandy Team Nissan	Altima	3	(Bulgaria) Vesko Kozarov	1, 7, 9–10, 12
Nissan	(United States) Skullcandy Team Nissan	Altima	13	(United States) Jason Cherry	1, 5
Nissan	(Japan) Nissan GT Academy	370Z	35	(United States) Nick Hammann	9, 12
Nissan	(Japan) Nissan GT Academy	370Z	35	(United States) Lara Tallman	10
Pontiac	(United States) Go 4 It Racing	Solstice GXP	41	(United States) Michael Pettiford	1
Porsche	(United States) Motorsports Promotions	Cayman	00	(United States) Corey Fergus (R)	All
Porsche	(United States) Autometrics Motorsports	Cayman	03	(United States) Cory Friedman	1, 5
Porsche	(United States) Autometrics Motorsports	Cayman	03	(United States) David Baum	9
Porsche	(United States) Autometrics Motorsports	Cayman	04	(United States) Cody Ellsworth	1, 5
Porsche	(United States) Autometrics Motorsports	Cayman	04	(United States) Cory Friedman	9
Porsche	(United States) BERG Racing	Cayman	40	(United States) John Weisberg	1, 5, 7
Porsche	(United States) BERG Racing	Cayman	40	(United States) Dinah Weisberg (R)	10
Porsche	(United States) Outlier Racing	Cayman	88	(United States) Kevin Krauss	7, 12
Scion	(United States) Brass Monkey Racing	FR-S	86	(United States) Tony Rivera	1, 7, 9–10, 12
Volkswagen	(United States) HPA Motorsports	Jetta GLI	15	(United States) Jeff Altenburg	All
Volkswagen	(United States) HPA Motorsports	Jetta GLI	16	(United States) Alex Welch	All
Volkswagen	(United States) Rains Racing	Jetta GLI	26	(South Africa) Mikey Taylor (R)	5, 7
Volkswagen	(United States) Rains Racing	Golf GTI	44	(United States) Andrew Rains (R)	5, 7, 10
Volkswagen	(United States) Emich Racing	Jetta GLI	87	(United States) Fred Emich	7, 9, 12
Volvo	(United States) 3R Racing	C30	14	(United States) Nathan Stacy	1, 5

Colour	Class
	TC
	TCA
	TCB

== Race results ==
Round		Circuit	GT Winning Car	GTA Winning Car	GT Cup Winning Car	GTS Winning Car	TC Winning Car	TCA Winning Car	TCB Winning Car
Round		Circuit	GT Winning Driver	GTA Winning Driver	GT Cup Winning Driver	GTS Winning Driver	TC Winning Driver	TCA Winning Driver	TCB Winning Driver
1	R1	Austin	#61 Ferrari 458 Italia GT3	#41 Porsche 911 GT3 R	#11 Porsche 911 GT3 Cup	#07 Aston Martin Vantage GT4	#04 Porsche Cayman	#86 Scion FR-S	#25 Chevy Sonic
1	R1	Austin	(Monaco) Olivier Beretta	(United States) Michael Lewis	(United States) Colin Thompson	(United States) Kris Wilson	(United States) Cody Ellsworth	(United States) Tony Rivera	(Denmark) Johan Schwartz
1	R2	Austin	#9 McLaren 650S GT3	#41 Porsche 911 GT3 R	#11 Porsche 911 GT3 Cup	#10 Chevrolet Camaro Z28	#04 Porsche Cayman	#86 Scion FR-S	#25 Chevy Sonic
1	R2	Austin	(France) Kévin Estre	(United States) Michael Lewis	(United States) Colin Thompson	(United States) Michael Cooper	(United States) Cody Ellsworth	(United States) Tony Rivera	(Denmark) Johan Schwartz
1	R3	Austin	Did not participate				#3 Nissan Altima	#36 Kia Forte Koup	#25 Chevy Sonic
1	R3	Austin	Did not participate				(Bulgaria) Vesko Kozarov	(United States) Jason Wolfe	(Denmark) Johan Schwartz
2	R1	St. Petersburg	#43 Acura TLX-GT	#65 Ferrari 458 Italia GT3	#18 Porsche 911 GT3 Cup	#50 Ford Mustang Boss 302	Did not participate		
2	R1	St. Petersburg	(United States) Ryan Eversley	(United States) Mike Hedlund	(United States) Phil Fogg Jr.	(United States) Dean Martin	Did not participate		
2	R2	St. Petersburg	#61 Ferrari 458 Italia GT3	#66 Mercedes-Benz SLS AMG GT3	#11 Porsche 911 GT3 Cup	#87 Ford Mustang Boss 302	Did not participate		
2	R2	St. Petersburg	(Monaco) Olivier Beretta	(United States) Frankie Montecalvo	(United States) Colin Thompson	(United States) Spencer Pumpelly	Did not participate		
3		Long Beach	#61 Ferrari 458 Italia GT3	#41 Porsche 911 GT3 R	#11 Porsche 911 GT3 Cup	Did not participate			
3		Long Beach	(Monaco) Olivier Beretta	(United States) Michael Lewis	(United States) Colin Thompson	Did not participate			
4	R1	Barber	#33 Nissan GT-R GT3	#07 Ferrari 458 Italia GT3	#11 Porsche 911 GT3 Cup	#07 Aston Martin Vantage GT4	Did not participate		
4	R1	Barber	(Australia) J. D. Davison	(Mexico) Martin Fuentes	(United States) Colin Thompson	(United States) Kris Wilson	Did not participate		
4	R2	Barber	#9 McLaren 650S GT3	#05 Nissan GT-R GT3	#11 Porsche 911 GT3 Cup	#07 Aston Martin Vantage GT4	Did not participate		
4	R2	Barber	(France) Kévin Estre	(United States) Bryan Heitkotter	(United States) Colin Thompson	(United States) Kris Wilson	Did not participate		
5	R1	Mosport	#3 Cadillac ATS-V.R GT3	#05 Nissan GT-R GT3	#11 Porsche 911 GT3 Cup	#37 Ford Mustang Boss 302	#98 Mazda MX-5	#23 Mazda RX-8	#58 Mini Cooper
5	R1	Mosport	(United States) Johnny O'Connell	(United States) Bryan Heitkotter	(United States) Colin Thompson	(United States) Kurt Rezzetano	(United States) Ernie Francis Jr.	(United States) Elivan Goulart	(Canada) Glenn Nixon
5	R2	Mosport	#3 Cadillac ATS-V.R GT3	#05 Nissan GT-R GT3	#13 Porsche 911 GT3 Cup	#73 Porsche Cayman S	#00 Porsche Cayman	#71 Honda Civic Si	#25 Chevy Sonic
5	R2	Mosport	(United States) Johnny O'Connell	(United States) Bryan Heitkotter	(United States) Lorenzo Trefethen	(United States) Jack Baldwin	(United States) Corey Fergus	(United States) Paul Holton	(Denmark) Johan Schwartz
5	R3	Mosport	Did not participate				#00 Porsche Cayman	#5 Honda Civic Si	#25 Chevy Sonic
5	R3	Mosport	Did not participate				(United States) Corey Fergus	(Colombia) Felipe Merjech	(Denmark) Johan Schwartz
6	R1	Detroit	#9 McLaren 650S GT3	#30 Ferrari 458 Italia GT3	Did not participate				
6	R1	Detroit	(France) Kévin Estre	(Venezuela) Henrique Cisneros	Did not participate				
6	R2	Detroit	Race cancelled due to heavy rain and low track visibility		Did not participate				
7	R1 (Note: The first GT/GTA/GT Cup race at Road America was a replacement for the cancelled second GT/GTA race at Detroit. Because the GT Cup cars did not participate at Detroit, they also did not participate in the replacement race at Road America.)	Road America	#25 Lamborghini Gallardo GT3 FL2	#05 Nissan GT-R GT3	Did not participate	#28 Aston Martin Vantage GT4	#3 Nissan Altima	#86 Scion FR-S	#58 Honda Fit
7	R1	Road America	(Czech Republic) Tomáš Enge	(United States) Bryan Heitkotter	Did not participate	(United States) Lou Gigliotti	(Bulgaria) Vesko Kozarov	(United States) Tony Rivera	(Canada) Glenn Nixon
7	R2	Road America	#16 Bentley Continental GT3	#66 Mercedes-Benz SLS AMG GT3	#11 Porsche 911 GT3 Cup	#32 Ford Mustang Boss 302	#15 VW Jetta GLI	#86 Scion FR-S	#58 Honda Fit
7	R2	Road America	(United States) Chris Dyson	(United States) Frankie Montecalvo	(United States) Colin Thompson	(United States) Andrew Aquilante	(United States) Jeff Altenburg	(United States) Tony Rivera	(Canada) Glenn Nixon
7	R3	Road America	#33 Nissan GT-R GT3	#66 Mercedes-Benz SLS AMG GT3	#11 Porsche 911 GT3 Cup	Did not participate	#98 Mazda MX-5	#86 Scion FR-S	#58 Honda Fit
7	R3	Road America	(Australia) J. D. Davison	(United States) Frankie Montecalvo	(United States) Colin Thompson	Did not participate	(United States) Ernie Francis Jr.	(United States) Tony Rivera	(Canada) Glenn Nixon
8	R1	Mid-Ohio	#31 Porsche 911 GT3 R	#66 Mercedes-Benz SLS AMG GT3	#17 Porsche 911 GT3 Cup	#10 Chevrolet Camaro Z28	Did not participate		
8	R1	Mid-Ohio	(United Kingdom) Ryan Dalziel	(United States) Frankie Montecalvo	(United States) Alec Udell	(United States) Michael Cooper	Did not participate		
8	R2	Mid-Ohio	#31 Porsche 911 GT3 R	#05 Nissan GT-R GT3	#11 Porsche 911 GT3 Cup	#07 Aston Martin Vantage GT4	Did not participate		
8	R2	Mid-Ohio	(United Kingdom) Ryan Dalziel	(United States) Bryan Heitkotter	(United States) Colin Thompson	(United States) Kris Wilson	Did not participate		
9	R1	Mid-Ohio	Did not participate				#98 Mazda MX-5	#36 Kia Forte Koup	#25 Chevy Sonic
9	R1	Mid-Ohio	Did not participate				(United States) Ernie Francis Jr.	(United States) Jason Wolfe	(Denmark) Johan Schwartz
9	R2	Mid-Ohio	Did not participate				#3 Nissan Altima	#36 Kia Forte Koup	#25 Chevy Sonic
9	R2	Mid-Ohio	Did not participate				(Bulgaria) Vesko Kozarov	(United States) Jason Wolfe	(Denmark) Johan Schwartz
9	R3	Mid-Ohio	Did not participate				#3 Nissan Altima	#24 BMW Z4	#25 Chevy Sonic
9	R3	Mid-Ohio	Did not participate				(Bulgaria) Vesko Kozarov	(United States) Toby Grahovec	(Denmark) Johan Schwartz
10	R1	Utah	#3 Cadillac ATS-V.R GT3	#66 Mercedes-Benz SLS AMG GT3	#17 Porsche 911 GT3 Cup	#38 Kia Optima	#3 Nissan Altima	#36 Kia Forte Koup	#58 Honda Fit
10	R1	Utah	(United States) Johnny O'Connell	(United States) Frankie Montecalvo	(United States) Alec Udell	(Canada) Mark Wilkins	(Bulgaria) Vesko Kozarov	(United States) Jason Wolfe	(Canada) Glenn Nixon
10	R2	Utah	#3 Cadillac ATS-V.R GT3	#66 Mercedes-Benz SLS AMG GT3	#11 Porsche 911 GT3 Cup	#10 Chevrolet Camaro Z28	#3 Nissan Altima	#36 Kia Forte Koup	#25 Chevy Sonic
10	R2	Utah	(United States) Johnny O'Connell	(United States) Frankie Montecalvo	(United States) Colin Thompson	(United States) Michael Cooper	(Bulgaria) Vesko Kozarov	(United States) Jason Wolfe	(Denmark) Johan Schwartz
10	R3	Utah	Did not participate				#3 Nissan Altima	#36 Kia Forte Koup	#47 Mazda Demio
10	R3	Utah	Did not participate				(Bulgaria) Vesko Kozarov	(United States) Jason Wolfe	(United States) Joey Jordan
11	R1	Sonoma	#9 McLaren 650S GT3	#7 Aston Martin V12 Vantage GT3	#17 Porsche 911 GT3 Cup	#20 Chevrolet Camaro	Did not participate		
11	R1	Sonoma	(France) Kévin Estre	(Denmark) Christina Nielsen	(United States) Alec Udell	(United States) Andy Lee	Did not participate		
11	R2	Sonoma	#31 Porsche 911 GT3 R	#66 Mercedes-Benz SLS AMG GT3	#11 Porsche 911 GT3 Cup	#10 Chevrolet Camaro Z28	Did not participate		
11	R2	Sonoma	(Netherlands) Renger van der Zande	(United States) Frankie Montecalvo	(United States) Colin Thompson	(United States) Michael Cooper	Did not participate		
12	R1	Laguna Seca	#29 Ferrari 458 Italia GT3	#08 Mercedes-Benz SLS AMG GT3	#11 Porsche 911 GT3 Cup	#07 Aston Martin Vantage GT4	#33 Mazda MX-5	#36 Kia Forte Koup	#47 Mazda Demio
12	R1	Laguna Seca	(Italy) Alessandro Balzan	(United States) Eric Lux	(United States) Colin Thompson	(United States) Kris Wilson	(United States) Adam Poland	(United States) Jason Wolfe	(United States) Joey Jordan
12	R2	Laguna Seca	Did not participate				#00 Porsche Cayman	#71 Honda Civic Si	#47 Mazda Demio
12	R2	Laguna Seca	Did not participate				(United States) Corey Fergus	(United States) Paul Holton	(United States) Joey Jordan
12	R3	Laguna Seca	Did not participate				#98 Mazda MX-5	#36 Kia Forte Koup	#47 Mazda Demio
12	R3	Laguna Seca	Did not participate				(United States) Ernie Francis Jr.	(United States) Jason Wolfe	(United States) Joey Jordan

== Championship standings ==
=== Drivers' Championships ===
Championship points were awarded to drivers based on qualifying and finishing positions. The driver had to complete at least 50% of the class winner's number of laps to receive points. The Pole position winner received 7 points. In addition, 1 bonus point was awarded to a driver leading a lap during a race, and 3 bonus points were awarded to the driver leading the most laps. The driver who set the fastest lap of the race received 1 bonus point.

Position	1	2	3	4	5	6	7	8	9	10	11	12	13	14	15	16	17	18	19	20	21	22	23	24	25	26	27	28	29	30	31	32	33	34	35	36	37	38	39	40
Race	140	110	95	85	80	76	72	68	64	60	57	54	51	48	45	43	41	39	37	35	33	31	29	27	25	23	21	19	17	15	13	11	9	7	6	5	4	3	2	1

==== GT ====
Pos	Driver	Car	AUS		STP		LBH	BAR		MOS		DET	ELK			MOH		UTA		SON		LAG	Points
1	(United States) Johnny O'Connell	Cadillac ATS-V.R GT3	3	7	4	5	22	4	30	**1***	**1***	4	8	8	7	4	5	**1***	**1***	5	8	12	1679
2	(Monaco) Olivier Beretta	Ferrari 458 Italia GT3	1	8	8	1*	**1***	7	4	7	8	**2**	4	24	3	3	4	12	10	4	3	28	1618
3	(United Kingdom) Ryan Dalziel	Porsche 911 GT3 R	2*	2	2	4	3	5	3	13	9		24	3	2	**1***	**1***	5	4			3	1579
4	(Australia) J. D. Davison	Nissan GT-R GT3	6	16	6	18	5	**1***	11	9	20	5	2	2	1*	2	2	2	2	7	6	7	1562
5	(France) Kévin Estre	McLaren 650S GT3	4	1*	5	3	26	29†	1*	2	6	1*	20	23	20	6	6	Wth	Wth	1	2	13	1426
6	(United States) Ryan Eversley	Acura TLX-GT	34	5	**1***	7	6	14	12	15	10	9	9	10	23	11	12	11	9	10	17	10	1198
7	(United States) Mike Skeen	Audi R8 LMS ultra	16	4	3	26	30†	3	5	5	4	23†	3	6	4	18	9	13	12	3	25†	27	1167
8	(United States) Michael Lewis **(R)**	Porsche 911 GT3 R	5	9	12	13	4																1163
8	(United States) Michael Lewis **(R)**	Porsche 911 GT3 R						23	6	8	12	7	26†	5	5	5	22	6	6	11	24†	5	1163
9	(United States) Chris Dyson	Bentley Continental GT3	18	17	9	10	2	6	29	4	3	3	6	1*	**17**	12	13	20	14	12	23†	18	1153
10	(United States) Bryan Heitkotter	Nissan GT-R GT3	14	23	30	DNS	20	17	8	10	5	14	7	11	26†	9	3						1055
10	(United States) Bryan Heitkotter	Nissan GT-R GT3																3	7	8	9	9	1055
11	(United States) Frankie Montecalvo	Mercedes-Benz SLS AMG GT3	8	22	14	11	27†	16	24	12	7	16	25†	9	8	8	8	10	13	14	7	11	999
12	(United Kingdom) Andy Pilgrim	Cadillac ATS-V.R GT3	17	19	7	**6**	23	26	7	25†	26	24†	16	16	12	27	10	7	5	6	5	4	995
13	(Venezuela) Henrique Cisneros	Ferrari 458 Italia GT3	12	12	20	15	16	12	16	14	14	8	10	14	10	14	23	17	18	15	13		913
14	(United States) Peter Cunningham	Acura TLX-GT	35†	DNS	11	14	9	8	9	11	11	20	23	13	9	10	11	8	11	26†	22†	6	912
15	(Mexico) Martin Fuentes	Ferrari 458 Italia GT3	11	15	22	24	8	9	15	17	16	18	18	25	14	28	14	14	16	21	11	24	827
16	(United States) Duncan Ende	Ferrari 458 Italia GT3	38†	26	19	17	25	11	10	16	13	12	12	15	24	7	17	15	17	19	21†	14	785
17	(United States) Robert Thorne	McLaren 650S GT3	19	10	24	22	24	13	**2**	6	25	6	14	22	27†	25	20	Wth	Wth	24	**4**	16	781
18	(United States) Eric Lux	Mercedes-Benz SLS AMG GT3	20	28	15	16	11	DNS	17	18	15	21	11	28†	22	26	15	16	15	18	10	8	746
19	(United States) Butch Leitzinger	Bentley Continental GT3	31	18	16	9	28†	Wth	Wth	3	2	Wth	**5**	**4**	6	22	24						662
20	(United States) James Sofronas	Audi R8 LMS ultra	13	11	13	8	7	10	19				17	26	11	13	27	Wth	Wth			22	600
21	(Netherlands) Nick Catsburg	Lamborghini Gallardo GT3 FL2	**10**	**3**	17	2		2	31†			22†						4	8				586
21	(Netherlands) Nick Catsburg	Lamborghini Gallardo R-EX																				Wth	586
22	(United States) Bret Curtis	BMW Z4 GT3	25	27	29	21	31†	19	13	22	21	10				20	16	21	19	17	19	21	567
23	(Denmark) Christina Nielsen **(R)**	Aston Martin V12 Vantage GT3	32	13	31†	23	12	28	18	19	17	11				15	18	Wth	Wth	13	14	15	516
24	(United States) Tim Pappas	Mercedes-Benz SLS AMG GT3	22	25	23	29†																	478
24	(United States) Tim Pappas	Dodge Viper GT3-R					19	15	14	26†	24	15	13	12	13	Wth	Wth					20	478
25	(United States) Bill Ziegler	BMW Z4 GT3	28	33	28	25	29†	21	25	23	27†	19	22	21	18	17	21	23†	23	22	16		436
26	(United States) Dan Knox	Dodge Viper GT3-R	21	29	25	28†	13	18	23	20	19	13	15	17	15	Wth	Wth						428
27	(United States) Drew Regitz	Audi R8 LMS ultra	29	DNS	32†	27	21	20	22	21	23	DNS	21	20	28†	21	28†	22†	22	23	15	23	413
28	(Sweden) Henrik Hedman	Mercedes-Benz SLS AMG GT3	26	24	18	20	17	27	20	24	18					Wth	Wth			20	20	25	362
29	(United States) Mike Hedlund	Ferrari 458 Italia GT3	15	14	10	12	10			DNS	DNS					Wth	Wth			16	DNS	19	327
30	(United Kingdom) Guy Smith	Bentley Continental GT3																9	3	9	12	17	319
31	(United States) Jeff Courtney	Audi R8 LMS ultra	36†	35	21	19	15	25	21	28†	22		19	27	16	Wth	Wth						311
32	(United States) Eduardo Cisneros **(R)**	Ferrari 458 Italia GT3												18	19	24	19	19	20	25	18		276
33	(Netherlands) Renger van der Zande	Porsche 911 GT3 R										DNS								**2***	1*		266
34	(Czech Republic) Tomáš Enge	Lamborghini Gallardo GT3 FL2											1*	7	21								251
35	(Italy) Alessandro Balzan	Ferrari 458 Italia GT3																				1*	144
36	(United States) Madison Snow	Audi R8 LMS ultra	9	6																			140
37	(United States) Joseph Toussaint **(R)**	Porsche 911 GT3 R	33	31				22	28							16	25						140
38	(Mexico) Jorge De La Torre	Aston Martin V12 Vantage GT3	30	34				24	27					DNS	DNS	23	26	DNS	DNS			29	139
39	(Italy) Alessandro Pier Guidi	Ferrari 458 Italia GT3																				**2**	118
40	(United States) Austin Cindric	Lamborghini Gallardo R-EX														19	7						109
41	(Mexico) Ricardo Pérez **(R)**	Ferrari 458 Italia GT3	7	20																			107
42	(United States) Alex Welch	Audi R8 LMS ultra	24	30										19	25†							26	102
43	(France) Henry Hassid	Lamborghini Gallardo R-EX																18	21				72
44	(Germany) Maximilian Vöelker	Lamborghini Gallardo GT3 FL2	27	21	33†	DNS																	54
45	(United States) David Welch	Audi R8 LMS ultra					14					17				Wth	Wth						49
46	(United States) Walt Bowlin	Audi R8 LMS ultra			27	31†		30†	26					DNS	DNS								44
47	(United States) Mark McKenzie	Aston Martin V12 Vantage GT3	23	32																			40
48	(United States) Brent Holden	Audi R8 LMS ultra			Wth	Wth	18									Wth	Wth	Wth	Wth				39
49	(Brazil) Marcelo Hahn	Lamborghini Gallardo R-EX			26	30†																	23
52	(Canada) Marc Muzzo	Ferrari 458 Italia GT3								27†	DNS												0
51	(United States) Guy Cosmo	Audi R8 LMS ultra	37†	36†																			0
52	(United States) Lou Gigliotti	Aston Martin V12 Vantage GT3	39†	DNS			DNS									Wth	Wth						0
53	(United States) Dane Cameron	BMW Z4 GT3																				DNS	0
Pos	Driver	Car	AUS		STP		LBH	BAR		MOS		DET	ELK			MOH		UTA		SON		LAG	Points

Color	Result
Gold	Winner
Silver	2nd place
Bronze	3rd place
Green	4th & 5th place
Light Blue	6th–10th place
Dark Blue	Finished (Outside Top 10)
Purple	Did not finish
Red	Did not qualify (DNQ)
Brown	Withdrawn (Wth)
Black	Disqualified (DSQ)
White	Did not start (DNS)
Blank	Did not participate

. – GTA class
**Bold** – Pole position
Italics – Fastest Lap
Asterisk * – Most laps led

Notes

- Results denoted by † did not complete sufficient laps in order to score points.

==== GTA ====
Michael Lewis ran in the GTA class during the first three events of the championship, but ran in the GT class from Barber on. Bryan Heitkotter ran in the GTA class during the first eight events of the championship, but ran in the GT class from Utah on. Those who finished behind Lewis and Heitkotter in the GTA class in the first eight events did not get more points despite the fact that Lewis and Heitkotter have been removed from the GTA standings.

Pos	Driver	Car	AUS		STP		LBH	BAR		MOS		DET	ELK			MOH		UTA		SON		LAG	Points
1	(United States) Frankie Montecalvo	Mercedes-Benz SLS AMG GT3	3	8	3	**1***	15†	**4**	**12**	**2***	2	7	10†	1	1*	1	3	**1***	**1***	**2**	**1***	2	2073
2	(Venezuela) Henrique Cisneros	Ferrari 458 Italia GT3	5	2	6	4	9	2	5	3	3	**1***	2	4	2	3	10	4	4	3	4		1767
3	(Mexico) Martin Fuentes	Ferrari 458 Italia GT3	4	5	8	10	2	1	4	4	5	9	6	10	4	13	4	2	3	8	3	8	1632
4	(United States) Eric Lux	Mercedes-Benz SLS AMG GT3	8	13	4	5	4	DNS	6	5	4	11	3	12†	9	12	5	3	2	6	2	**1***	1481
5	(United States) Bret Curtis	BMW Z4 GT3	13	12	14	8	17†	7	2	9	9	2				8	6	7	5	5	9	6	1157
6	(Denmark) Christina Nielsen **(R)**	Aston Martin V12 Vantage GT3	19	3	16†	9	5	14	7	6	6	3				4	7	Wth	Wth	1*	5	3	1069
7	(United States) Bill Ziegler	BMW Z4 GT3	16	18	13	11	16†	9	13	10	13†	10	9	9	7	6	9	9†	9	9	7		925
8	(United States) Tim Pappas	Mercedes-Benz SLS AMG GT3	10	11	9	14†																	914
8	(United States) Tim Pappas	Dodge Viper GT3-R					12	3*	3	12†	12	6	4	3	3	Wth	Wth					5	914
9	(United States) Drew Regitz	Audi R8 LMS ultra	17	DNS	17†	12	14	8	10	8	11	DNS	8	8	12†	9	13†	8†	8	10	6	7	832
10	(United States) Dan Knox	Dodge Viper GT3-R	9	14	10	13†	6	6	11	7	8	4	5	5	5	Wth	Wth						826
11	(Sweden) Henrik Hedman	Mercedes-Benz SLS AMG GT3	14	10	5	7	10	13	8	11	7					Wth	Wth			7	10	9	744
12	(United States) Mike Hedlund	Ferrari 458 Italia GT3	7	4	1*	2	3			DNS	DNS					Wth	Wth			4	DNS	4	656
13	(United States) Jeff Courtney	Audi R8 LMS ultra	21†	20	7	6	8	12	9	14†	10		7	11	6	Wth	Wth						634
14	(United States) Eduardo Cisneros **(R)**	Ferrari 458 Italia GT3												6	8	11	8	6	6	11	8		546
15	(Mexico) Jorge De La Torre	Aston Martin V12 Vantage GT3	18	19				11	15					DNS	DNS	10	12	DNS	DNS			11	349
16	(United States) Joseph Toussaint **(R)**	Porsche 911 GT3 R	20	16				10	16							5	11						318
17	(United States) Alex Welch	Audi R8 LMS ultra	12	15										7	10†							10	231
18	(Mexico) Ricardo Pérez **(R)**	Ferrari 458 Italia GT3	2	**6**																			195
19	(United States) Austin Cindric	Lamborghini Gallardo R-EX														**7**	2						190
20	(France) Henry Hassid	Lamborghini Gallardo R-EX																5	7				152
21	(Germany) Maximilian Vöelker	Lamborghini Gallardo GT3 FL2	15	7	18†	DNS																	117
22	(United States) Walt Bowlin	Audi R8 LMS ultra			12	16†		15†	14					DNS	DNS								102
23	(United States) David Welch	Audi R8 LMS ultra					7					8				Wth	Wth						100
24	(United States) Mark McKenzie	Aston Martin V12 Vantage GT3	11	17																			98
25	(Brazil) Marcelo Hahn	Lamborghini Gallardo R-EX			11	15†																	58
26	(United States) Brent Holden	Audi R8 LMS ultra			Wth	Wth	11									Wth	Wth	Wth	Wth				57
27	(Canada) Marc Muzzo	Ferrari 458 Italia GT3								13†	DNS												0
Drivers ineligible for GTA championship points
	(United States) Bryan Heitkotter	Nissan GT-R GT3	**6**	9	**15**	DNS	13	5	1*	1	**1***	5	**1***	**2***	**11**†	2*	**1***						
	(United States) Michael Lewis **(R)**	Porsche 911 GT3 R	1*	1*	2	3	**1***																
Pos	Driver	Car	AUS		STP		LBH	BAR		MOS		DET	ELK			MOH		UTA		SON		LAG	Points

Notes

- Results denoted by † did not complete sufficient laps in order to score points.

==== GT Cup ====
Every driver competes in a Porsche 911 GT3 Cup.

Pos	Driver	AUS		STP		LBH	BAR		MOS		ELK		MOH		UTA		SON		LAG	Points
1	(United States) Colin Thompson	**1***	**1***	**7**†	1	**1***	**1**	**1***	**1***	**2***	**1***	**1***	**2**	**1***	**2***	1*	**3***	**1***	**1**	2309
2	(United States) Sloan Urry	2	2	6†	2*	5	3	3	2	4	2	8	3	4	3	3	2	3	2	1644
3	(United States) Lorenzo Trefethen **(R)**	5	5	2	**3**	6	4	4	3	1	5	4	4	5	6	4	6	4	4	1532
4	(United States) Alec Udell	3	3	8†	DNS		2*	2			3	2	1*	2	1	**2**	1	2	3*	1484
5	(United States) Preston Calvert **(R)**	9	7	5	4	4	6	6	8	7	4	7	8	8	7	6	7	7	5	1339
6	(United States) Mitch Landry	8	6	3	7†	2	8	7	5	5	6	6	5	6	4	7	4	6	7	1331
7	(Puerto Rico) Victor Gomez **(R)**	10	9	4	5	3	9	9	7	6	7	5	7	7	8†	8	5	5	6	1260
8	(United States) Phil Fogg Jr.	4	4	1*	6†	7	5	5	4	3					5	5	8†	DNS	Wth	867
9	(United States) Eduardo Cisneros **(R)**	6	10	Wth	Wth	DNS	7	8	6	8										400
10	(United States) Brett Sandberg										8	3	6	3						334
11	(Mexico) Santiago Creel **(R)**	7	8																	140
Pos	Driver	AUS		STP		LBH	BAR		MOS		ELK		MOH		UTA		SON		LAG	Points

Notes

- Results denoted by † did not complete sufficient laps in order to score points.

==== GTS ====
Pos	Driver	Car	AUS		STP		BAR		MOS		ELK		MOH		UTA		SON		LAG	Points
1	(United States) Michael Cooper	Chevrolet Camaro Z28	8	1*	7	5	5	10	14	3	17*	10	1*	4	6	**1***	2	1*	10	1539
2	(United States) Andrew Aquilante	Ford Mustang Boss 302	2	3	20	2	3	4	4	5	4	**1***	3	8	10	12	4	3	3	1463
3	(United States) Jack Baldwin	Porsche Cayman S	18	16	4	9	**4**	**23**†	3	1*	**2**	3	**19**	**2**	2	4	3	4	**2**	1439
4	(United States) Dean Martin	Ford Mustang Boss 302	3	4	**1***	**4**	21	8	11	4	9	6	2	3	7	7	8	7	8	1385
5	(United States) Kurt Rezzetano	Ford Mustang Boss 302	4	8	2	3	7	7	1*	2	5	12	5	7	8	8	5	23†	17	1314
6	(United States) Kris Wilson	Aston Martin Vantage GT4	**1***	**9**	5	7	1	1*					4	1*			6	2	1*	1221
7	(United Kingdom) Ben Clucas	Kia Optima	5	2	6	6	8*	3	7	8	15	2	9	9	4	3	9	22†	4	1206
8	(Canada) Mark Wilkins	Kia Optima	7	6	8	8	2	20	5	10	3	4	17	19	**1***	5	11	8	26†	1186
9	(United States) Andy Lee	Chevrolet Camaro	19†	10	17	12	10	9	8	12	20†	9	10	5	5	6	**1***	**20**†	5	1008
10	(United States) Jack Roush Jr.	Ford Mustang Boss 302	9	5	9	10	12	13	6	7	10	8	8	12	Wth	Wth			6	858
11	(United States) Nick Esayian	Ford Mustang Boss 302	14	12	12	18†	16	16												839
11	(United States) Nick Esayian	Aston Martin Vantage GT4							9	11	11	7	11	18	11	11	10	21†	9	839
12	(United States) Tony Gaples	Chevrolet Camaro Z28	10	13	14	19†			10	13	12	11	6	11	12	9	12	12	13	787
13	(United States) Buz McCall	Porsche Cayman S	15	15	16	13	15	15	12	16	14	15	16	15	16	14	15	15	19	785
14	(United States) Lou Gigliotti	Aston Martin Vantage GT4	13	18	10	17	9	5	13	DNS	1	17	7	6	Wth	Wth			Wth	719
15	(United States) Mark Klenin	Aston Martin Vantage GT4	12	11	15	15	14	14	15	15	16	16	18	13	13	16†	18	14	16	714
16	(United States) Nathan Stacy	Ford Mustang Boss 302					13	12			13	13	12	14	9	10	7	5	22	631
17	(United States) Preston Calvert **(R)**	Ford Mustang Boss 302	17	19†	19	14	19	19	16†	14	18	14	13	20†	14	13	20	18	20	609
18	(United States) Dan Martinson **(R)**	Ford Mustang Boss 302	11	17	11	20†	11	22†	17†	6	7	19†	20†	10						424
19	(United States) Derek DeBoer	Aston Martin Vantage GT4	6	7	13	11	DNS	DNS									14	10		364
20	(United States) Spencer Pumpelly	Ford Mustang Boss 302			3	1*	23†	2												349
21	(United States) Geoff Reeves	Chevrolet Camaro	16	14																329
21	(United States) Geoff Reeves	Chevrolet Camaro Z28			18	16	20	17									19	24†	21	329
22	(United States) John Allen **(R)**	Porsche Cayman S					18	18			DNS	DNS			15	15	23	19		238
23	(Bulgaria) Vesko Kozarov	Nissan 370Z	DNS	DNS											3	2			27†	205
24	(Canada) Max Riddle	Aston Martin Vantage GT4							**2**	**9**										189
25	(United States) Kevin Marshall	Lotus Evora GT4															13	9	14	172
26	(United States) Jeff Huber	Aston Martin Vantage GT4															17	13	18	137
27	(United States) Lawson Aschenbach	Chevrolet Camaro Z28					6	11												136
28	(United States) Paul Holton	Audi TT-RS															22	17	24	107
29	(United States) Brandon Gdovic	Ford Mustang Boss 302											14	16						91
30	(United States) (Germany) Peter Ludwig	Aston Martin Vantage GT4															21	11		90
31	(United States) Ray Mason	Ford Mustang Boss 302											15	17						86
32	(United States) Jason Alexandridis	Aston Martin Vantage GT4															16	16		86
33	(United States) Nick Hammann	Nissan 370Z															25†	6		76
34	(United States) Joey Atterbury	Ford Mustang Boss 302									8	20†								72
35	(United States) Jon Fogarty	Hyundai Genesis Coupe																	15	54
36	(United States) Jeff Harrison	Hyundai Genesis Coupe															24	DNS		27
37	(United States) Bryan Leonard	Aston Martin Vantage GT4					22†	21†							Wth	Wth				0
Drivers ineligible for GTS championship points
	(United States) Nick Mancuso	Maserati GranTurismo MC									6	5								
	(United States) Brandon Davis	Porsche 911 Carrera						6												
	(United States) Derek Hill	Maserati GranTurismo MC																	7	
	(United States) Jeff Courtney	Maserati GranTurismo MC																	11	
	(United States) Patrick Byrne	Maserati GranTurismo MC																	12	
	(United States) Clint Guthrie	Porsche 911 Carrera					17													
	(Canada) Gianmarco Raimondo	Maserati GranTurismo MC									19	18†								
	(United States) Vafa Kordestani	Maserati GranTurismo MC																	23	
	(United Kingdom) Freddie Hunt	Maserati GranTurismo MC																	25†	
Pos	Driver	Car	AUS		STP		BAR		MOS		ELK		MOH		UTA		SON		LAG	Points

Notes

- Results denoted by † did not complete sufficient laps in order to score points.

==== TC ====
Pos	Driver	Car	AUS			MOS			ELK			MOH			UTA			LAG			Points
1	(United States) Corey Fergus **(R)**	Porsche Cayman	6	3	4	4	1*	**1***	2	6	11	**2***	4	5	5	3	7†	11	1*	2	1654
2	(United States) Ernie Francis Jr.	Mazda MX-5	5	15†	7	**1***	**10**	2	15†	16†	1*	1	2	4	2	2	2	**12**	2	**1***	1621
3	(United States) Adam Poland	Mazda MX-5	3	**2**	9	2	2	3	4	**3**	2	8	11	3	9†	9†	DNS	1	4	6	1415
4	(Bulgaria) Vesko Kozarov	Nissan Altima	13	8	1*				1*	8	**13**†	13†	**1***	1	**1***	**1***	**1***	7*	**3**	11	1395
5	(United States) John Weisberg	Porsche Cayman	8	7	14†	6	7	6	9	11	14†										1154
5	(United States) John Weisberg	Mazda MX-5										3	3	**6**	4	5	3	5	13†	8	1154
6	(United States) Alex Welch	Volkswagen Jetta GLI	DNS	14†	10	11	8	9	6	5	15†	5	5	2*	3	4	6	3	6	4	1097
7	(United States) Austin Snader	Mazda MX-5	9	10	12	7	6	8	8	4	17†	12	DNS	7	8	6	DNS	4	7	3	984
8	(United States) Paul Street **(R)**	Honda Accord	12	11	11				12	10	10	10	8	9				13	11	10	702
9	(United States) Cody Ellsworth	Porsche Cayman	**1***	1*	3	3	3	4													625
10	(United States) Steve Burns **(R)**	Ford Mustang V6							11	12	7				7	8	4	6	12	9	602
11	(United States) Jeff Altenburg	Volkswagen Jetta GLI	11	13	DNS	13	15†	Wth	5	1*	12	4	12	13†	Wth	Wth	Wth	Wth	Wth	Wth	578
12	(United States) Randy Hale	Mazda MX-5	10	DNS	DNS	10	12	14	7	9	5							10	9	12†	526
13	(United States) Fred Emich	Volkswagen Jetta GLI							13	17†	4	6	6	12				2	10	13†	512
14	(United States) Jason Cherry	Nissan Altima	4	4	5	14	5	5													458
15	(United States) Jeff Ricca	Hyundai Genesis Coupe							**14**	7	3	7	10	10							414
16	(United States) Nick Hammann	Nissan 370Z										9	9	8				8	8	7	404
17	(South Africa) Mikey Taylor **(R)**	Volkswagen Jetta GLI				9	11	12	3	2	6										401
18	(United States) Cory Friedman	Porsche Cayman	2	16†	2	15	4	7				14†	DNS	DNS							378
19	(United States) Kevin Krauss	Porsche Cayman							16†	14	8							9	5	5	340
20	(United States) Nathan Stacy	Volvo C30	15	6	6	5	13†	10													337
21	(United States) Dinah Weisberg **(R)**	Mazda MX-5	14	12	13†	8	9	13	17†	15†	16†										285
21	(United States) Dinah Weisberg **(R)**	Porsche Cayman													Wth	Wth	Wth				285
22	(United States) Andrew Rains **(R)**	Volkswagen Golf GTI				12	14†	11	10	13	9				Wth	Wth	Wth				260
23	(United States) Lara Tallman	Nissan 370Z													6	7	5				223
24	(United States) Andrew Aquilante	Ford Mustang V6	16	5	**8**																199
25	(United States) David Baum	Porsche Cayman										11	7	11							186
26	(United States) Ian Lacy	Ford Mustang V6	7	9	15†																136
27	(United States) Michael Pettiford	Pontiac Solstice GXP	DNS	DNS	DNS																0
28	(United States) Tommy Chen	Honda S2000																Wth	Wth	Wth	0
Pos	Driver	Car	AUS			MOS			ELK			MOH			UTA			LAG			Points

Notes

- Results denoted by † did not complete sufficient laps in order to score points.

==== TCA ====
Pos	Driver	Car	AUS			MOS			ELK			MOH			UTA			LAG			Points
1	(United States) Jason Wolfe	Kia Forte Koup	8	2	1*	3	2	8	9	4	5	**1***	**1***	10†	**1***	1*	1*	1*	3	1	1951
2	(Canada) Patrick Seguin	Honda Civic Si	5	5	4	5	3	2	5	5	3	3	2	2	2	2	**2**	**2**	2	7	1742
3	(United States) Tony Rivera	Scion FR-S	1	1*	**3**				**1***	**1**	**1***	4	11†	3	8	3	3	3	9	**9**	1510
4	(United States) Emilee Tominovich **(R)**	Honda Civic Si	7	6	6	7	6	3	8	6	4	8	5	4	6	5	7	13†	6	4	1282
5	(United States) Kris Wright **(R)**	Kia Forte Koup	11^{1}	8	9	4	DNS	4	10	10†	8	5	4	7	3	4	5	5	8	11	1190
6	(Canada) Samantha Tan **(R)**	Kia Forte Koup	9†	DNS	DNS	6	4	5	7	7	9	9	8	9	4	6	6	9	10	5	1086
7	(United States) Paul Holton	Honda Civic Si	2	4		2	1*	7*										4	**1***	8*	834
8	(United States) Kevin Anderson	Mazda RX-8	6	9	10†	9	8	9†	2	3	10†		9	11†	Wth	Wth	Wth	6	12	2	782
9	(United States) Toby Grahovec	BMW Z4							3	2*	2	2	3	**1***							676
10	(United States) Ron Yarab	Honda Civic Si							6	8	6	6	10	6	7	7	8				644
11	(United States) Paul Whiting	Honda Civic Si													5	8	4	10	4	10	438
12	(United States) Gino Carini	Mazda RX-8							4	9†	7							8	11	12†	282
13	(United States) Shea Holbrook	Honda Civic Si	3	3	5	11†	DNS	DNS													270
14	(United States) Robby Foley **(R)**	Mazda RX-8	**4***	**7**	8																244
15	(United States) Steve Kohli	Honda Civic Si										7	6	5	10†	DNS	DNS				228
16	(United States) Steve Bottom	Mazda MX-5																7	5	6	228
17	(United States) Andrew Rains **(R)**	Honda Civic Si																11	7	3	224
18	(United States) Timothy Mincey Sr. **(R)**	Honda Civic Si				8	7	6													216
19	(Colombia) Juan Carlos Casadiego	Honda Civic Si			2		5														190
20	(United States) Elivan Goulart	Mazda RX-8				**1***	**9**†	**DNS**													166
21	(Colombia) Felipe Merjech	Honda Civic Si		10		10†		1													155
22	(United States) Jason Saini	Mazda RX-8													9	**9**	DNS				136
23	(United States) Jon Miller	Honda Civic Si										11†	7								72
24	(Canada) Karl Thomson	Honda Civic Si			7																72
25	(Canada) Chase Pelletier	Honda Civic Si							11†	DNS	11†			8	Wth	Wth	Wth	Wth	Wth	Wth	68
26	(United States) Yiannis Tsiounis	Mazda RX-8										10									60
27	(United States) Neal de Paz **(R)**	Honda Civic Si	10†																		0
28	(United States) Brian Lift **(R)**	Mazda RX-8																12†	13†	13†	0
Pos	Driver	Car	AUS			MOS			ELK			MOH			UTA			LAG			Points

Notes

- Results denoted by † did not complete sufficient laps in order to score points.
- ^{1} – Kris Wright was put in last place of the TCA class for an issue in post tech after Race 1 at Austin.

==== TCB ====
Pos	Driver	Car	AUS			MOS			ELK			MOH			UTA			LAG			Points
1	(Denmark) Johan Schwartz	Chevrolet Sonic	**1***	1	**1***	**4***	1*	**1***	3	5	11	1*	**1***	**1***	5	1*	2	4	4	13	2081
2	(Canada) Glenn Nixon	Mini Cooper	2	**2***	3	1	2	2													1964
2	(Canada) Glenn Nixon	Honda Fit							**1***	1	1*	2	2	2	**1***	2	3	2*	3	**4**	1964
3	(Canada) Andrei Kisel	Mini Cooper	14^{1}	4	9	5	12†	11†	2	**2***	2	4	8	8	4	4	5	**5**	2	5	1368
4	(United States) Van Svenson **(R)**	Chevrolet Sonic	3	3	5	12†	7	8	4	3	7	6	10	4	2	**6**	6	7	10	8	1326
5	(United States) Jason Fichter	Mini Cooper	6	10	2	11	4	5	8	8	9	9	11	5	6	7	8	9	8	6	1293
6	(Canada) P. J. Groenke	Mini Cooper	7	7	8	6	10	10	9	11	12†	8	5	7	8	10	9	8	11	10	1114
7	(United States) Tom Noble	Mini Cooper	9	11	11	9	9	9	11	10	8				7	9	10	12	14	12	907
8	(Canada) Wei Lu **(R)**	Mini Cooper	5	6	6	10	6	6				5	6	11	3	5	4				906
9	(United States) Marc Sherrin **(R)**	Ford Fiesta	12	12	12	8	8	7	12†	9	10	11	12	9	10†	8	7	15	16†	15	899
10	(United States) Joey Jordan	Mazda Demio													11†	3	**1***	1	**1***	1*	686
11	(United States) Jay Salinsky	Honda Fit	11	5	14							10	9	3				10	9	7	600
12	(United States) James Wilson	Mazda Demio	4	14	4				10	7	6							16†	7	9	562
13	(Canada) Randy Smith	Honda Fit				7	3	3	7	4	4										504
14	(Canada) Nic Duynstee	Mini Cooper							5	6	5							6	6	3	483
15	(United States) Tom O'Gorman **(R)**	Honda Fit										12	4	12				3	5	2	479
16	(United States) Travis W. Washay **(R)**	Mini Cooper				3	**11**	4	6	12	**3**										448
17	(United States) Nick Lougee	Mini Cooper										7	3	10							227
18	(United States) Chris Holter	Mazda Demio	8	9	7																204
19	(United States) Jeremy Rohan **(R)**	Ford Fiesta	10	8	10																188
20	(United States) Ted Hough	Honda Fit													9	11	11				178
21	(United States) Mac Korince **(R)**	Cooper				2	5	DNS													165
22	(United States) Matt Travis	Ford Fiesta																11	15	11	159
23	(United States) Timothy Mincey Sr. **(R)**	Honda Fit	13	13	13																153
24	(United States) Cameron Parsons	Mazda Demio																13	12	16	148
25	(United States) Steve Taake	Mazda Demio	DNS	DNS	DNS													14	13	14	147
26	(United States) Steve Kohli	Honda Fit							13†	DNS	13†										0
27	(United States) Yiannis Tsiounis	Honda Fit										Wth	Wth	Wth							0
Drivers ineligible for TCB championship points
	(United States) Kevin Boehm	Honda Fit										**3**									
	(United States) Jeff Barrow	Honda Fit												6							
	(United States) Andrew Salzano	Honda Fit											7								
Pos	Driver	Car	AUS			MOS			ELK			MOH			UTA			LAG			Points

Notes

- Results denoted by † did not complete sufficient laps in order to score points.
- ^{1} – Andrei Kisel was put in last place of the TCB class for driving conduct after Race 1 at Austin.

=== Manufacturers' Championships ===
Only those manufacturers who are SCCA Pro Racing corporate members were eligible to receive points toward the Manufacturers' Championship. Championship points were awarded to manufacturers based on qualifying and finishing positions. Only the highest finishing car of each eligible manufacturer earned points for its finishing position. The Pole position winner received 1 bonus point.

Position	1	2	3	4	5	6
Race	9	7	5	3	2	1

==== GT ====
Pos	Manufacturer	Car	AUS		STP		LBH	BAR		MOS		DET	ELK			MOH		UTA		SON		LAG	Points
1	(Germany) Porsche	911 GT3 R	2*	2	2	4	3	5	3	8	9	7	24	3	2	**1***	**1***	5	4	**2***	1*	3	95
2	(Italy) Ferrari	458 Italia GT3	1	8	8	1*	**1***	7	4	7	8	**2**	4	14	3	3	4	12	10	4	3	**1***	73
3	(United States) Cadillac	ATS-V.R GT3	3	7	4	**5**	22	4	7	**1***	**1***	4	8	8	7	4	5	**1***	**1***	5	5	4	69
4	(United Kingdom) McLaren	650S GT3	4	1*	5	3	24	13	**1***	2	6	1*	14	22	20	6	6	Wth	Wth	1	**2**	13	65
5	(Japan) Nissan	GT-R GT3	6	16	6	18	5	**1***	8	9	5	5	2	2	1*	2	2	2	2	7	6	7	61
6	(United Kingdom) Bentley	Continental GT3	18	17	9	9	2	6	29	3	2	3	**5**	**1***	**6**	12	13	9	3	9	12	17	45
7	(Germany) Audi	R8 LMS ultra	9	4	3	8	7	3	5	5	4	17	3	6	4	13	9	13	12	3	15	22	34
8	(Japan) Acura	TLX-GT	34	5	**1***	7	6	8	9	11	10	9	9	10	9	10	11	8	9	10	17	6	14
9	(Germany) AMG/Mercedes-Benz	SLS AMG GT3	8	22	14	11	11	16	17	12	7	16	11	9	8	8	8	10	13	14	7	8	0
10	(United Kingdom) Aston Martin	V12 Vantage GT3	23	13	31†	23	12	24	18	19	17	11		DNS	DNS	15	18	DNS	DNS	13	14	15	0
11	(United States) Dodge	Viper GT3-R	21	29	25	28†	13	15	14	20	19	13	13	12	13	Wth	Wth					20	0
Manufacturers ineligible for GT championship points
	(Italy) Lamborghini	Gallardo GT3 FL2/Gallardo R-EX	**10**	**3**	17	2		2	31†			22†	1*	7	21	19	7	4	8			Wth	
	(Germany) BMW	Z4 GT3	25	27	28	21	29†	19	13	22	21	10	22	21	18	17	16	21	19	17	16	21	
Pos	Driver	Car	AUS		STP		LBH	BAR		MOS		DET	ELK			MOH		UTA		SON		LAG	Points

Color	Result
Gold	Winner
Silver	2nd place
Bronze	3rd place
Green	4th-6th place
Dark Blue	Finished (Outside points)
Purple	Did not finish
Red	Did not qualify (DNQ)
Brown	Withdrawn (Wth)
Black	Disqualified (DSQ)
White	Did not start (DNS)
Blank	Did not participate

**Bold** – Pole position
Italics – Fastest Lap
Asterisk * – Most laps led

Notes

- Results denoted by † did not complete sufficient laps in order to score points.

==== GTS ====
Pos	Manufacturer	Car	AUS		STP		BAR		MOS		ELK		MOH		UTA		SON		LAG	Points
1	(United States) Ford	Mustang Boss 302	2	3	**1***	**1***	3	2	1*	2	4	**1***	2	3	7	7	4	3	3	98
2	(United Kingdom) Aston Martin	Vantage GT4	**1***	**7**	5	7	1	1*	**2**	**9**	1	7	4	1*	11	11	6	2	1*	79
3	(Germany) Porsche	Cayman S	15	15	4	9	**4**	**15**	3	1*	**2**	3	**16**	**2**	2	4	3	4	**2**	70
4	(United States) Chevrolet	Camaro (Z28)	8	1*	7	5	5	9	8	3	12*	9	1*	4	5	**1***	**1***	**1***	5	64
5	(South Korea) Kia	Optima	5	2	6	6	2*	3	5	8	3	2	9	9	**1***	3	9	8	4	55
6	(Japan) Nissan	370Z	DNS	DNS											3	2	25†	6	27†	13
Manufacturers ineligible for GTS championship points
	(Italy) Maserati	GranTurismo MC									6	5							7	
	(United Kingdom) Lotus	Evora GT4															13	9	14	
	(South Korea) Hyundai	Genesis Coupe															24	DNS	15	
	(Germany) Audi	TT-RS															22	17	24	
Pos	Manufacturer	Car	AUS		STP		BAR		MOS		ELK		MOH		UTA		SON		LAG	Points

Notes

- Results denoted by † did not complete sufficient laps in order to score points.

==== TC ====
Pos	Manufacturer	Car	AUS			MOS			ELK			MOH			UTA			LAG			Points
1	(Japan) Mazda	MX-5	3	**2**	7	**1***	**2**	2	4	**3**	1*	1	2	**3**	2	2	2	**1**	2	**1***	126
2	(Japan) Nissan	Altima/370Z	4	4	1*	14	5	5	1*	8	**13**†	9	**1***	1	**1***	**1***	**1***	7*	**3**	7	84
3	(United States) Ford	Mustang V6	7	5	**8**				11	12	7				7	8	4	6	12	9	7
4	(Japan) Honda	Accord/S2000	12	11	11				12	10	10	10	8	9				13	11	10	0
Manufacturers ineligible for TC championship points
	(Germany) Porsche	Cayman	**1***	1*	2	3	1*	**1***	2	6	8	**2***	4	5	5	3	7†	9	1*	2	
	(Germany) Volkswagen	Golf GTI/Jetta GLI	11	13	10	9	8	9	3	1*	6	4	5	2*	3	4	6	2	6	4	
	(South Korea) Hyundai	Genesis Coupe							**14**	7	3	7	10	10							
	(Sweden) Volvo	C30	15	6	6	5	13†	10													
	(United States) Pontiac	Solstice GXP	DNS	DNS	DNS																
Pos	Manufacturer	Car	AUS			MOS			ELK			MOH			UTA			LAG			Points

Notes

- Results denoted by † did not complete sufficient laps in order to score points.

==== TCA ====
Pos	Manufacturer	Car	AUS			MOS			ELK			MOH			UTA			LAG			Points
1	(Japan) Honda	Civic Si	2	3	2	2	1*	1*	5	5	3	3	2	2	2	2	**2**	**2**	**1***	3*	117
2	(South Korea) Kia	Forte Koup	8	2	1*	3	2	4	7	4	5	**1***	**1***	7	**1***	1*	1*	1*	3	1	107
3	(Japan) Mazda	MX-5/RX-8	**4***	**7**	8	**1***	**8**	**9**	2	3	7	10	9	11†	9	**9**	DNS	6	5	2	40
Manufacturers ineligible for TCA championship points
	(United States) Scion	FR-S	1	1*	**3**				**1***	**1**	**1***	4	11†	3	8	3	3	3	9	**9**	
	(Germany) BMW	Z4							3	2*	2	2	3	**1***							
Pos	Manufacturer	Car	AUS			MOS			ELK			MOH			UTA			LAG			Points

Notes

- Results denoted by † did not complete sufficient laps in order to score points.
