= Andrew Aquilante =

American racing driver (born 1987)

- Born: June 16, 1987 (age 39) Phoenixville, Pennsylvania, U.S.

Pirelli World Challenge career
- Debut season: 2015
- Current team: Phoenix Performance Racing Team
- Starts: 17
- Wins: 1
- Poles: 1
- Fastest laps: 1

Andrew Aquilante (born June 16, 1987) is an American racing driver competing in such disciplines as the SCCA National Championship Runoffs and the Trans-Am Series.

== Career history ==
Aquilante began racing quarter midgets at eight years old. Hoosier Racing Tire honored Aquilante in 2022 with the Hoosier Hero award.

=== SCCA competition ===
Aquilante began racing in SCCA competition in 2004. Aquilante has shown success at the SCCA National Championship Runoffs winning his fourteenth championship in 2023 which places him third all time behind Jerry Hansen and John Heinricy. His championships have come among two classes Grand Touring 2 (GT2) and Touring 1 (T1).

=== Pro competition ===
In 2008 and 2009, Aquilante drove for Subaru Road Racing Team in the Koni Challenge Series. In 2009, he finished second in the championship earning three podiums. In 2015, Aquilante drove in the Pirelli World Challenge (now GT World Challenge America) in the GTS class driving a Ford Mustang Boss 302. He finished second in the championship earning one win and multiple podiums. In 2018, Aquilante entered the Trans-Am Series.

== Racing record ==
=== SCCA National Championship Runoffs ===
| Year | Track | Car | Engine | Class | Finish | Start | Status |
|---|---|---|---|---|---|---|---|
| 2004 | Mid-Ohio | Chevrolet Corvette | Chevrolet | Touring 1 | 10 | 11 | Running |
| 2005 | Mid-Ohio | Dodge Viper | Dodge | Touring 1 | 4 | 6 | Running |
| 2006 | Heartland Park Topeka | Dodge Viper SRT-10 | Dodge | Touring 1 | 21 | 3 | Running |
| 2006 | Heartland Park Topeka | Pontiac Solstice | Pontiac | Showroom Stock B | 14 | 1 | Running |
| 2007 | Heartland Park Topeka | Chevrolet Corvette | Chevrolet | Touring 1 | 1 | 1 | Running |
| 2008 | Heartland Park Topeka | Chevrolet Corvette | Chevrolet | Touring 1 | 12 | 1 | Running |
| 2011 | Road America | Ford Mustang GT | Ford | Touring 2 | 17 | 1 | Running |
| 2012 | Road America | Mustang Boss 302 | Ford | Touring 1 | 2 | 2 | Running |
| 2013 | Road America | Chevrolet Corvette | Chevrolet | Touring 1 | 1 | 1 | Running |
| 2013 | Road America | Chevrolet Corvette | Chevrolet | GT2 | 1 | 1 | Running |
| 2014 | Laguna Seca | Ford Mustang | Ford | Touring 1 | 1 | 2 | Running |
| 2014 | Laguna Seca | Chevrolet Corvette | Chevrolet | GT2 | 1 | 1 | Running |
| 2015 | Daytona | Mustang Boss 302 | Ford | Touring 1 | 1 | 1 | Running |
| 2016 | Mid-Ohio | Chevrolet Corvette | Chevrolet | Touring 1 | 15 | 2 | Running |
| 2016 | Mid-Ohio | Chevrolet Corvette | Chevrolet | GT2 | 2 | 1 | Running |
| 2017 | Indianapolis Motor Speedway | Ford Mustang | Ford | Touring 1 | 1 | 1 | Running |
| 2017 | Indianapolis Motor Speedway | Chevrolet Corvette | Chevrolet | GT2 | 1 | 1 | Running |
| 2018 | Sonoma Raceway | Chevrolet Corvette | Chevrolet | Touring 1 | 2 | 1 | Running |
| 2018 | Sonoma Raceway | Ford Mustang | Ford | GT2 | 18 | 2 | Running |
| 2019 | Virginia International Raceway | Ford Mustang | Ford | Touring 1 | 2 | 1 | Running |
| 2019 | Virginia International Raceway | Ford Mustang | Ford | GT2 | 1 | 1 | Running |
| 2020 | Road America | Chevrolet Corvette | Chevrolet | Touring 1 | 12 | 1 | Running |
| 2020 | Road America | Ford Mustang | Ford | GT2 | 1 | 1 | Running |
| 2021 | Indianapolis | Ford Mustang | Ford | Touring 1 | 1 | 1 | Running |
| 2021 | Indianapolis | Chevrolet Corvette | Chevrolet | GT2 | 2 | 1 | Running |
| 2022 | Virginia International Raceway | Ford Mustang | Ford | Touring 1 | 1 | 1 | Running |
| 2022 | Virginia International Raceway | Chevrolet Corvette | Chevrolet | GT2 | 1 | 1 | Running |
| 2023 | Virginia International Raceway | Ford Mustang | Ford | Touring 1 | 1 | 1 | Running |
| 2024 | Road America | Ford Mustang | Ford | Touring 1 | 1 | 1 | Running |

=== Pirelli World Challenge ===
| Year | Team | Car | Make | 1 | 2 | 3 | 4 | 5 | 6 | 7 | 8 | 9 | 10 | 11 | 12 | 13 | 14 | 15 | 16 | 17 | Rank | Points |
|---|---|---|---|---|---|---|---|---|---|---|---|---|---|---|---|---|---|---|---|---|---|---|
| 2015 | Phoenix American Motorsports | Ford Mustang Boss 302 | GTS | AUS; 2 | AUS; 3 | SPGP; 20 | SPGP; 2 | BAR; 3 | |BAR; 4 | MOS; 4 | MOS; 5 | ROA; 4 | ROA; 1 | MOH; 3 | MOH; 8 | UTA; 10 | UTA; 12 | SONO; 4 | SONO; 3 | LAG; 3 | 2nd | 1463 |
