= MaX5 Racing Championship =

The MaX5 Racing Championship is a UK based one-make sports car series using older specification mark 1 1600cc Mazda MX-5s. It was started in the summer of 2003 by Alyn Robson and Jonathan Halliwell, with the first race season being held in 2004. It was based upon the original MX5 Championship that ran between 1990–91 and the American Spec Miata MX-5 Championship. The championship works on the ethos that close racing is exciting racing, and is aimed at drivers who want to race for fun. This is summed up in the championship's slogan, "Race it to the max." The championship has gained success through its cheap racing entry fees and the popular nature of the Mazda MX5.

Although the main race calendar contains some major British circuits, including Silverstone and Brands Hatch, the championship has also taken in minor circuits such as Lydden Hill and Mallory Park, circuits not often visited by major British car championships.

To race in the series, prospective drivers are required to join the MAX5 racing club for an annual membership fee. The minimum racing licence for entering the championship is a National B ARDS (Advanced Racing Driver Schools) licence.

Drivers can compete in the MaX5 races for a whole season, but an Arrive and Drive package is offered in an attempt to attract new drivers into the championship, costing £750 + VAT per race.

== 2005 ==
There was a close race for the championship saw Martin Byford winning the Championship from Christian Dick by 2 points at the last meeting of the season. The competition regularly attracted grids of over 20 cars.

== 2006 ==
The 2006 season opener is at Mallory Park on April 23. The series has been regularly part of one of National motorsport's major packages, Dunlop's Great and British festivals, which featured Radicals, Ginettas and the Mini Cooper challenge, alongside the MaX5 Racing Championship. The first occasion that the Mazdas featured in the package was on the weekend of 27–28 May 2006 on the Welsh circuit of Pembrey, south Wales.

Here are the final 2006 championship standings:

1. Jonathan Greensmith: 654 points 2. Paul Sheard: 651 points 3. Scott Kirlew: 631 points

== 2007 ==
2007 saw the closest title race in the short history of the MaX5 Racing Championship, with two drivers (Jonathan Greensmith and Paul Sheard) finishing the season level on 827 points in 1st place. A novice driver, Tom Roche, finished in an impressive 3rd place overall.

== 2008 ==
2008 saw 50% of the drivers leave to form the Ma5da racing championship.

After 5 rounds Richard Breland lead the championship with 285 points.

== 2009 ==
By this year, virtually all drivers had moved to the new Ma5da racing championship, leaving MaX5 with an average grid of only six cars.

== Notable drivers ==
Chris Stockton- As well as occasional appearances in the MaX5 Championship, Stockton has also raced in the British Touring Car Championship since 2006 with the same team as in BTC Racing, in a Lexus IS200. He finished 10th in his first BTCC race meeting. In 2004 Chris raced in the Le Mans 24 Hours endurance race in a TVR T400 GT and competed earlier in the year in the European and American Le Mans Series with the same car.

Martin Byford- Another former MaX5 Championship driver to later turn up in the BTCC, Martin now races for AmD Milltek Racing teams in their VW Golf GTi, having succeeded Team Principal Shaun Hollamby as driver, who had stepped back into the role following Tom Onslow-Cole's surprise move to Team AON midway through a round.

Paul Sheard- Sheard has competed in the MaX5 Racing Championship almost since its beginnings in 2004. He was runner-up in the championship before jointly claiming the title in 2007, and has 12 wins, 14 2nd places and 8 3rd places. He previously competed in the TVR Tuscan series and ASCAR, the ill-fated British version of the American stock car racing series, NASCAR.
