= Simpson Design =

Automobile manufacturer

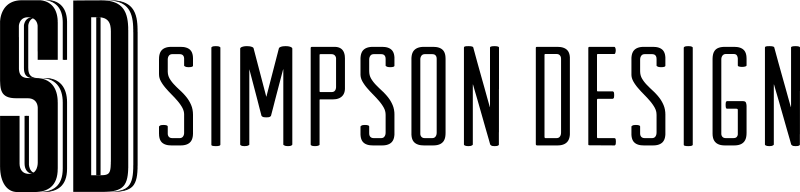
- Company type: Privately held company
- Industry: Automotive
- Founded: 1978
- Founder: Jim Simpson
- Headquarters: Clinton, Washington, United States
- Area served: Worldwide
- Products: Sports cars
- Owner: Jim Simpson
- Website: simpsondesign.net

Simpson Design is an American automobile coachbuilder founded in 1978 by owner Jim Simpson. The company is based in Clinton, Whidbey Island, located just outside of Seattle, Washington, and specializes in the production of custom sports cars coachbuilt bodies and interiors, mainly built on the Mazda Miata MX-5 chassis.

== History ==
In 1978, Company founded by current CEO Jim Simpson in Houston, TX

In 1991, Blue Ray 1 created for SEMA

In 1992, Blue Ray 3 show car created for Nardi introduction at Pebble Beach Concours, debuted at Concours Italiano

In 2002, Simpson Design relocated headquarters to Clinton, WA

== Models ==
Production Models

- Swift
- Italia 3 GTZ
- Italia 3 SWB
- Italia 2
- Italia Classic

Show Cars

- Manta Ray
- Blue Ray 3 (1992 Pebble Beach Concours d'Elegance / Concours Italiano show car)
- Blue Ray 2
- Blue Ray 1 (1991 SEMA show car)
