= Bob Hall (American motoring journalist) =

American journalist and car designer (born June 8, 1953)

- Born: June 8, 1953 (age 72); United States
- Occupations: Journalist; Automotive product planner
- Spouse: Karen Hall

Bob Hall is a former American motoring journalist best known for his work as an automotive product planner.

Hall is best known as a founder member of the development team who produced the Mazda MX-5.

== Career ==
=== Automotive journalism ===
Hall started his career as a journalist for Motor Trend.

=== Development of the Mazda MX-5 ===
Hall's first blackboard sketch of a two-seater convertible car in the early 1980s resulted in him being offered a job by Mazda Motors although he has no formal engineering qualifications. Hall is considered to be the "biological father" of the MX-5 (known in the United States as the Miata), although he was not responsible for the engineering and styling work that brought it to production.

=== Return to journalism and back to product planning ===
After leaving Mazda, Hall continued his career as an automotive journalist in Australia.

Hall lived in Malaysia from 2004 to 2011, working for Proton as Head of product planning and programme engineering.

In September 2014 Hall joined Geely, where it has been said he's been tasked to come up with an all-new mass-selling vehicle to hit the spot with western markets. While he has not commented on what the new vehicle may be, he has said it will not be a front-engine, rear-drive sportscar.

== Personal life ==
He is married to Karen, is the twin brother of Jim Hall (who worked in product management at General Motors), and is fluent in Japanese.
