= Mazda MX-5 =

Lightweight two seater roadster

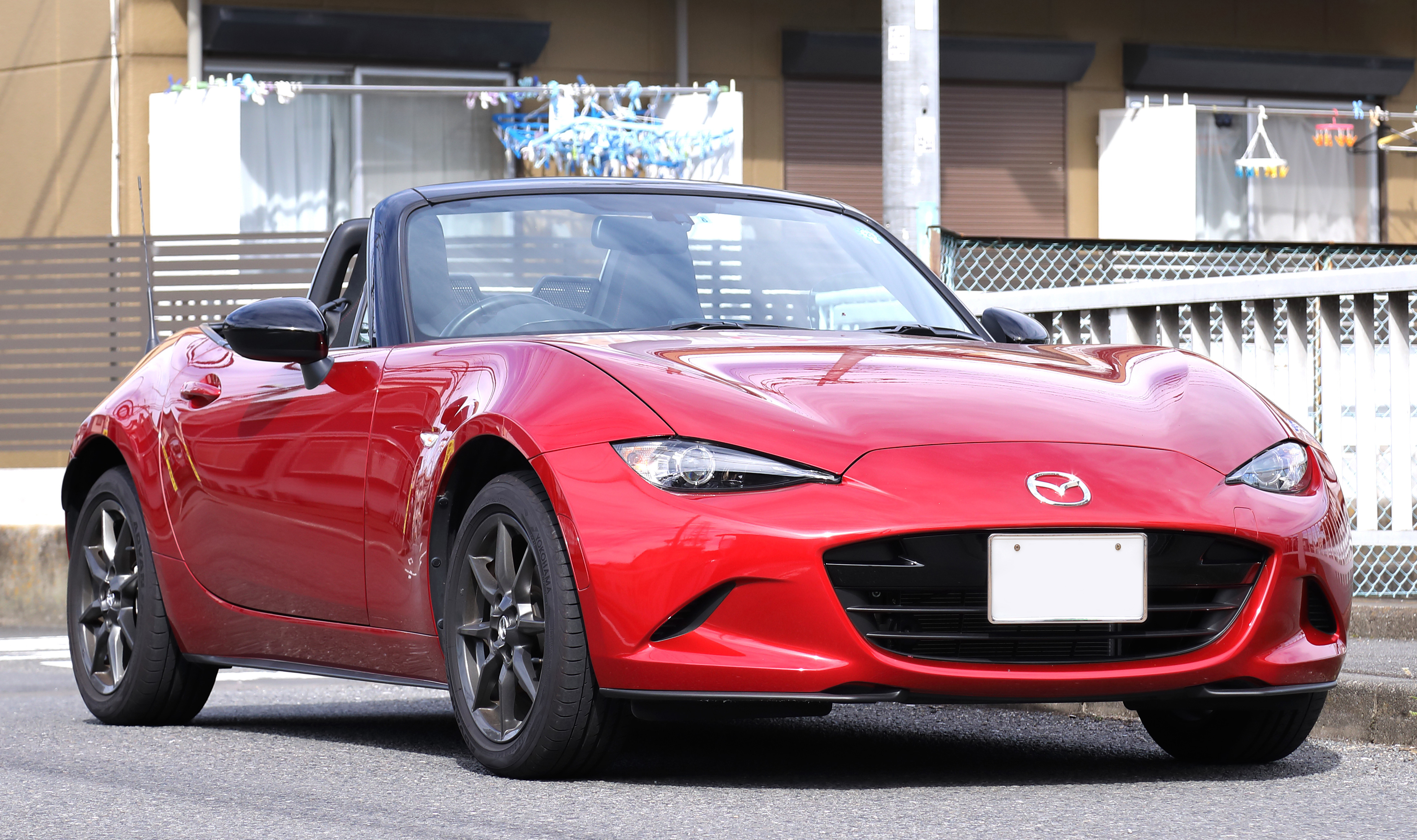

Overview
- Manufacturer: Mazda
- Also called: Mazda Roadster (Japan); Eunos Roadster (Japan); Mazda MX-5 Miata (North America)
- Production: 1989–present
- Assembly: Japan: Hiroshima (Ujina Plant No. 1)

Body and chassis
- Class: Roadster, sports car (S)
- Layout: Front-engine, rear-wheel-drive layout (NA and NB); Front mid-engine, rear-wheel-drive (NC and ND)
- Platform: Mazda N platform

The Mazda MX-5 is a lightweight two-seat sports car manufactured and marketed by Mazda. While in most markets it is called the MX5, in Japan it is marketed as the Mazda Roadster (Note: Japanese: マツダ・ロードスター, Hepburn: Matsuda Rōdosutā) or, previously, as the Eunos Roadster, (Note: Japanese: ユーノス・ロードスター, Hepburn: Yūnosu Rōdosutā) and In the United States it is sold as the Mazda MX-5 Miata (/miˈɑːtə/). The name miata derives from Old High German for "reward" (Note: The word is the etymon of the modern German Miete ("rent [payment]"). It is also a cognate of the rare English word meed ("reward, wage").), and the MX-5 nameplate was derived from it being the fifth vehicle produced by the Mazda experimental division.

Produced at Mazda's Hiroshima plant, the MX-5 debuted in 1989 at the Chicago Auto Show. It was created under the design credo Jinba ittai, meaning "unity of horse and rider". Noted for its small, light, balanced and minimalist design, the MX-5 has often been described as a successor to the 1950s and 1960s Italian and British roadsters, with the Lotus Elan serving as a design benchmark.

Each generation is identified by a two-letter code, beginning with the first generation NA. The second generation NB launched in 1998, followed by the third generation NC in 2005, and the fourth generation ND in 2015.

More than one million MX-5s have been sold, making it the best-selling two-seat convertible sports car in history.

== Overview ==
The original MX-5 was launched at a time when small roadsters had almost disappeared from the market, with the Alfa Romeo Spider as one of the few comparable models still in production, though at a significantly higher price. That left the MX-5 as the spiritual successor to cars like the MGB, Triumph TR7, Triumph Spitfire, and Fiat Spider.

The MX-5 was introduced in February 1989 at the Chicago Auto Show. The first generation MX-5 sold 228,961 units between 1989 and 1997.

The lightweight, unibody MX-5 has responsive handling and a curb weight under 1,100 kg (2,500 lb). Its longitudinal truss, marketed as the Powerplant Frame (PPF), provides a rigid connection between the engine and differential to minimize flex and improve balance. Some MX-5 models feature a limited-slip differential, traction control, and an anti-lock braking system.

With an approximate 50:50 front/rear weight balance, the car has nearly neutral handling. Inducing oversteer is easy and controllable, making the MX-5 a popular choice for amateur and stock racing, autocross, and club racing.

== Conception ==
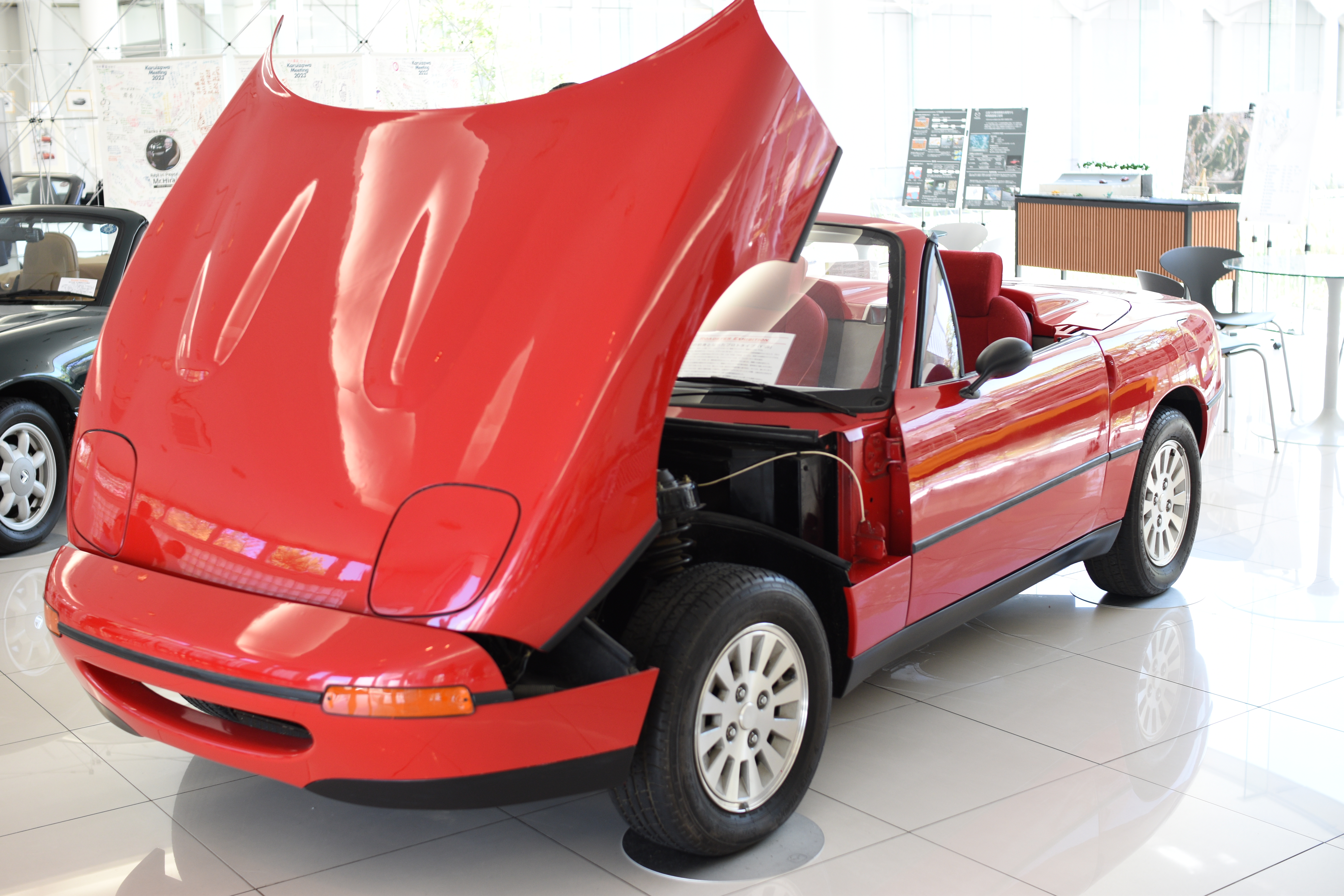
1985 Mazda V705

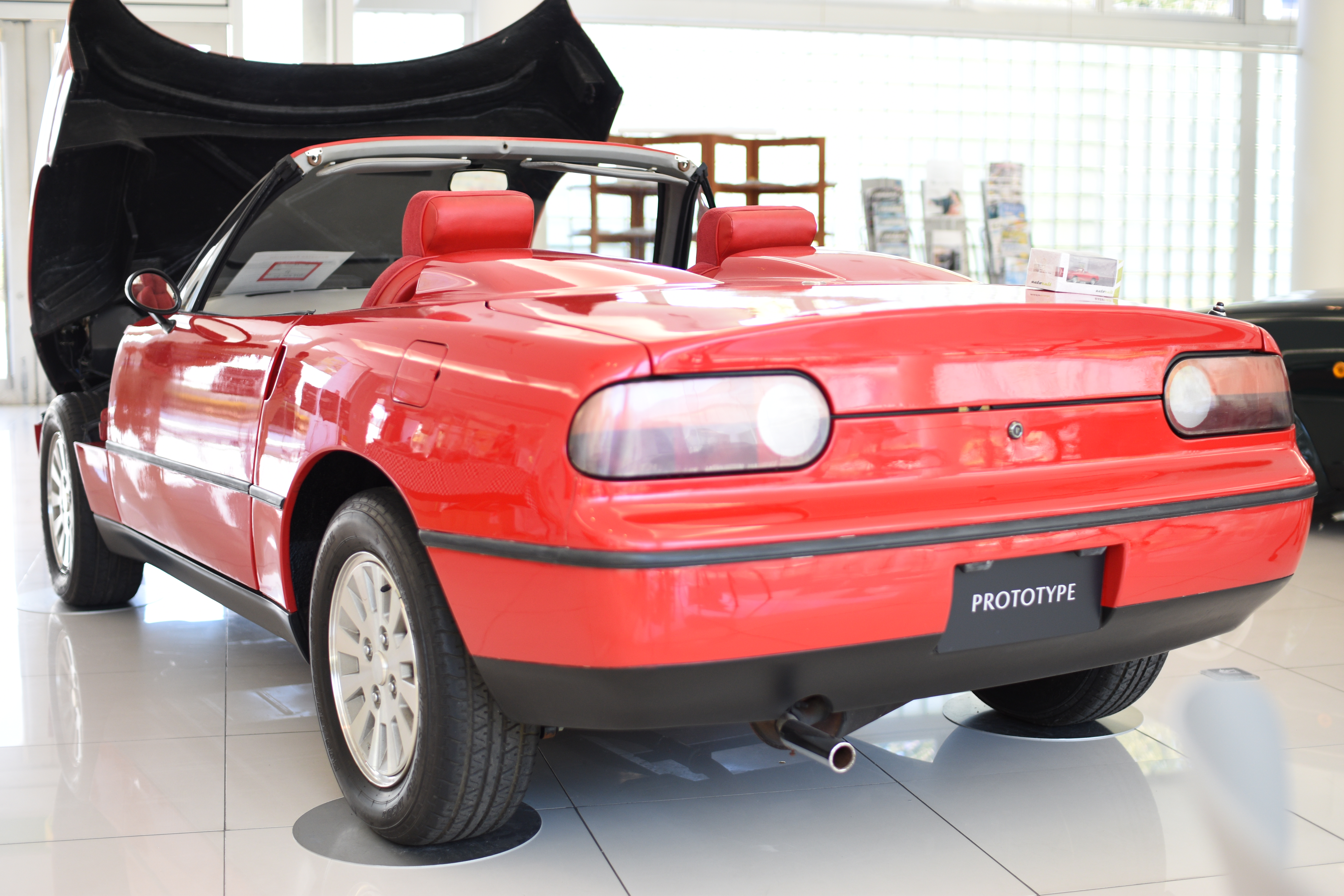
Rear view of Mazda V705

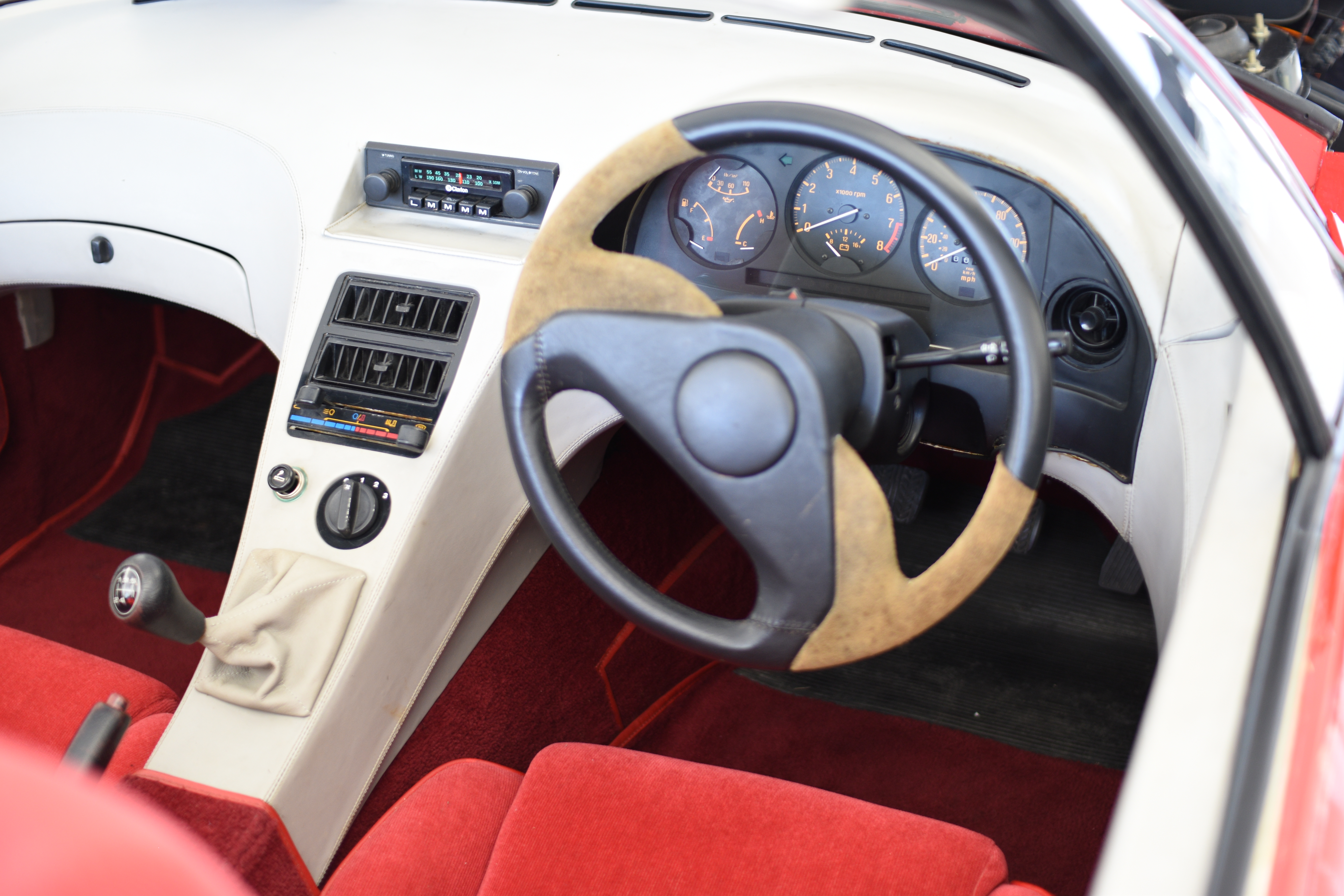
Interior of V705

In 1976, Bob Hall, a journalist at Motor Trend magazine who was an expert in Japanese cars and fluent in the language, met Kenichi Yamamoto and Gai Arai, head of Research and Development at Mazda. Yamamoto and Gai Arai asked Hall what kind of car Mazda should make in the future:

I babbled [...] how the [...] simple, bugs-in-the-teeth, wind-in-the-hair, classically-British sports car doesn't exist any more. I told Mr. Yamamoto that somebody should build one [...] inexpensive roadster.

In 1981, Hall moved to a product planning position with Mazda USA and again met Yamamoto, now chairman of Mazda Motors, who remembered their conversation about a roadster and in 1982 gave Hall the go-ahead to research the idea further. At this time Hall hired designer Mark Jordan to join the newly formed Mazda design studio in Southern California. There, Hall and Jordan collaborated on the parameters of the initial image, proportion and visualization of the "light-weight sports" concept. In 1983, the idea turned concept was approved under the "Offline 55" program, an internal Mazda initiative that sought to change the way new models were developed. Thus, under head of project Masakatsu, the concept development was turned into a competition between the Mazda design teams in Tokyo and California.

The California team proposed a front-engine, rear-wheel-drive layout, codenamed Duo 101, in line with the British roadster ancestry, but their Japanese counterparts favored the more common front-engine, front-wheel-drive layout or the rear mid-engine, rear-wheel-drive layout.

The first round of judging the competing designs was held in April 1984, with designs presented on paper only. The mid-engined car appeared to offer favorable qualities, although it was known at the time that such a layout would struggle to meet the noise, vibration, and harshness (NVH) requirements of the project. It was only at the second round of the competition in August 1984, when full-scale clay models were presented, that the Duo 101 won the competition and was selected as the basis for what would become the MX-5.

The Duo 101, so named as either a soft top or hardtop could be used, incorporated many key stylistic cues inspired by the Lotus Elan, a 1960s roadster, including the door handles, tail lamps and grille opening as well as engine appearance and center console layout. International Automotive Design (IAD) in Worthing, England, was commissioned to develop a running prototype, codenamed V705. It was built with a fiberglass body, a 1.4 L (85 cu in) engine from a Mazda Familia and components from a variety of early Mazda models. The V705 was completed in August 1985. It was taken to the US where it rolled on the roads around Santa Barbara, California, receiving positive reactions from the public which were filmed for the benefit of Mazda's executives back in Hiroshima.

The project received final approval on 18 January 1986. The model's codename was changed to P729 as it moved into the production phase, under head of program Toshihiko Hirai. The task of constructing five engineering mules (more developed prototypes) was again allocated to IAD, which also conducted the first front and rear crash tests on the P729. While Tom Matano, Mark Jordan, Wu-huang Chin (秦無荒, also on the RX-7 team), Norman Garrett, and Koichi Hayashi (林 浩一) worked on the final design, the project was moved to Japan for engineering and production details.

By 1989, with a definitive model name now chosen, the MX-5 was ready to be introduced to the world as a true lightweight sports car, weighing just 940 kg (2,070 lb).

Although Mazda's concept was for the MX-5 to be an inexpensive sports car, at introduction the design met strong demand, with dealers in the US charging as much as US$10,000 on top of the list price of $14,000 to $16,000. Demand was so strong that waiting lists extended to several months, causing some potential buyers to travel across multiple states in an attempt to buy cars directly from dealers.

== Generations ==
=== First generation – NA (1989–1997) ===
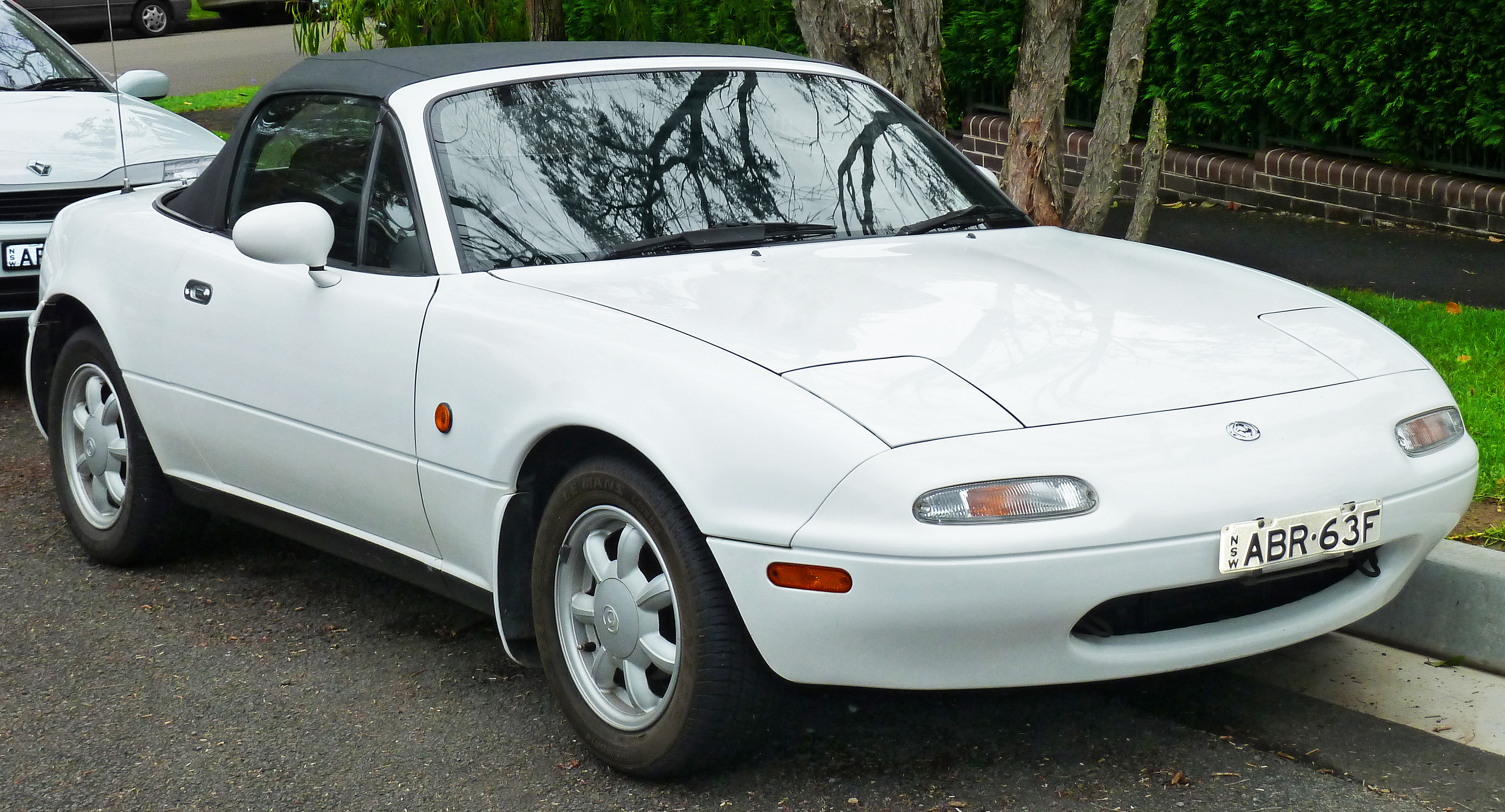
Mazda MX-5 (NA)

The first generation MX-5 was introduced in 1989 and was in production until 1997. Upon its release, the car won numerous accolades such as Automobile Magazine's 1990 Automobile of the Year and Car and Driver's 10Best list from 1990 to 1992. It initially featured a 1.6 L (98 cu in) straight-four engine making 116 horsepower; in late 1993, a larger 1.8-liter engine was made standard in most markets.

The MX-5 was designed with inspiration from the Lotus Elan, with features such as pop-up headlights unique to the NA model. To keep the weight and price down, base models were not equipped with power steering, air conditioning, or a sound system, and had steel wheels. A five-speed manual transmission was standard, with the option of a four-speed automatic also available.

=== Second generation – NB (1998–2005) ===
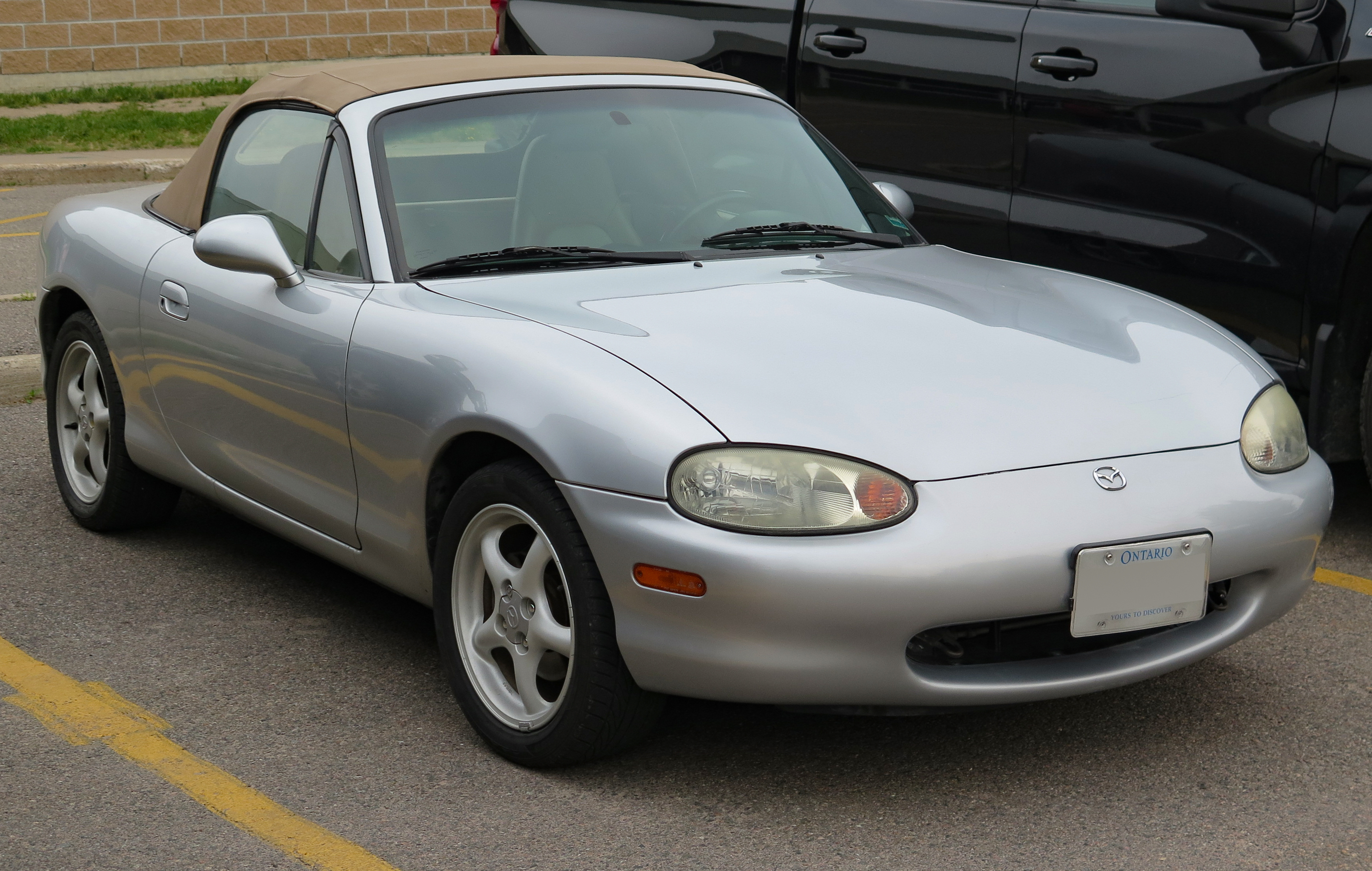
Mazda MX-5 (NB)

The second generation MX-5 was unveiled in 1997 and sold beginning in 1998 for the 1999 model year. While keeping the same proportions as the predecessor, Mazda removed the retractable headlamps, due to more stringent pedestrian safety testing. The NB model of the MX-5 had a slight increase in engine power, changes to interior design, and the option of a six-speed manual transmission. In 2001, Mazda increased in engine power slightly, made small changes to the interior, and added a six-speed manual transmission option. In 2001, Mazda changed the front and rear styling, and added variable-valve timing engine technology for the 1.8-liter engine, which made 106 kW (142 hp). Updated models have since been known as NB2, while the earlier versions are referred to as NB1. While various special editions continued to be introduced throughout the entire NB production run, the Mazdaspeed MX-5 is the only MX-5 to be turbocharged at the factory. The Mazdaspeed variant, built for the model years 2004 and 2005, made 133 kW (178 hp) from a turbocharged version of the normal 1.8-liter engine, enabling a quarter-mile time of 15.2 seconds and a 0–97 km/h (0–60 mph) time of 6.7 seconds. Other Mazdaspeed specs include stiffer and shorter springs, Bilstein shocks, and larger 17-inch wheels.

=== Third generation – NC (2005–2015) ===
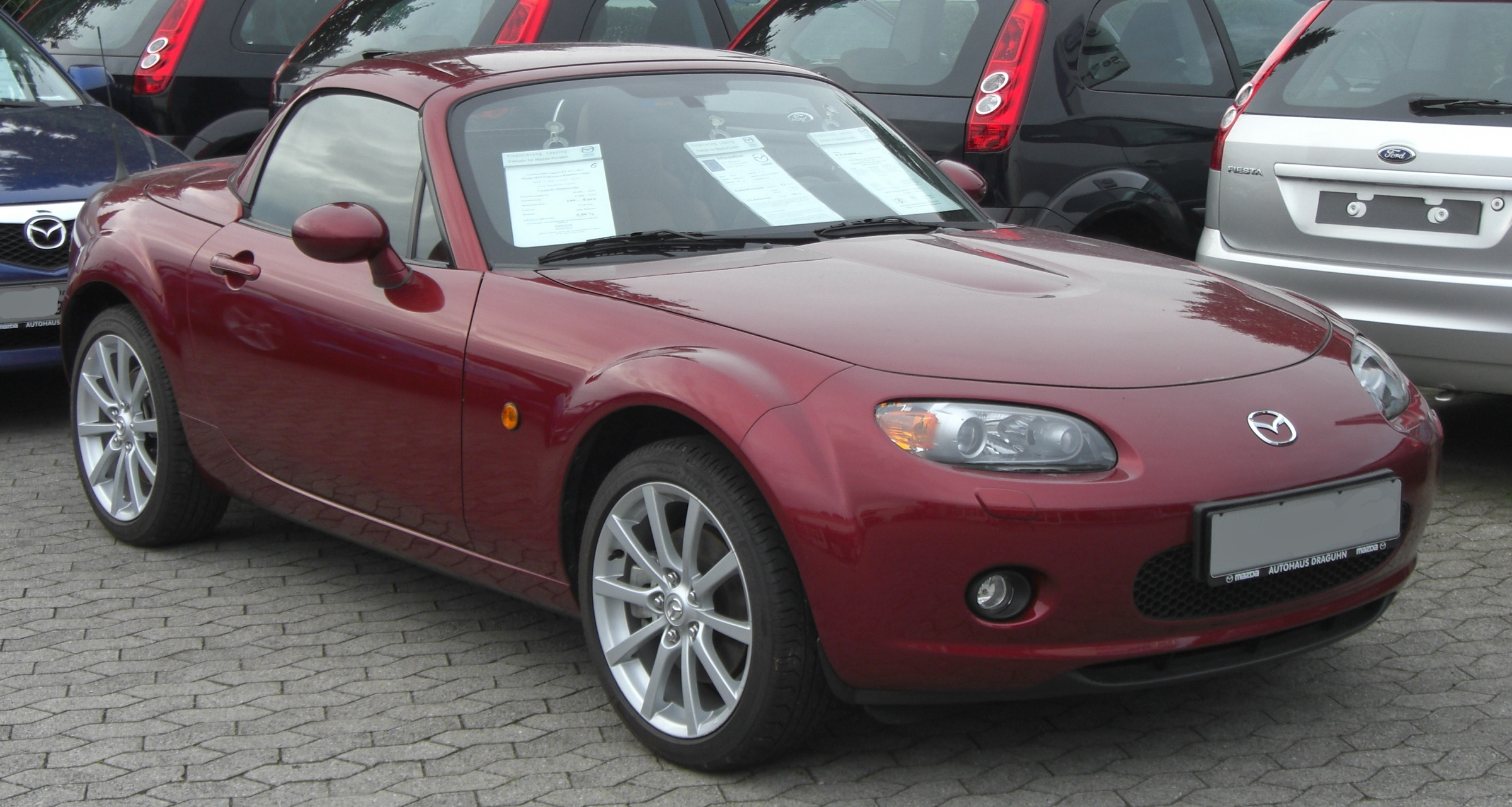
Mazda MX-5 (NC)

Taking design cues from the 2003 Mazda Ibuki concept car, the third-generation Mazda MX-5 was introduced in 2005 and was in production until 2015. This generation introduced Power Retractable Hard Top (PRHT), a variant featuring a folding hard top mechanism that does not encroach on trunk space. During its release, the third generation MX-5 received several accolades such as the 2005–2006 Car of the Year Japan Award and Car and Driver's 10Best list from 2006 to 2013.

=== Fourth generation – ND (2015–present) ===
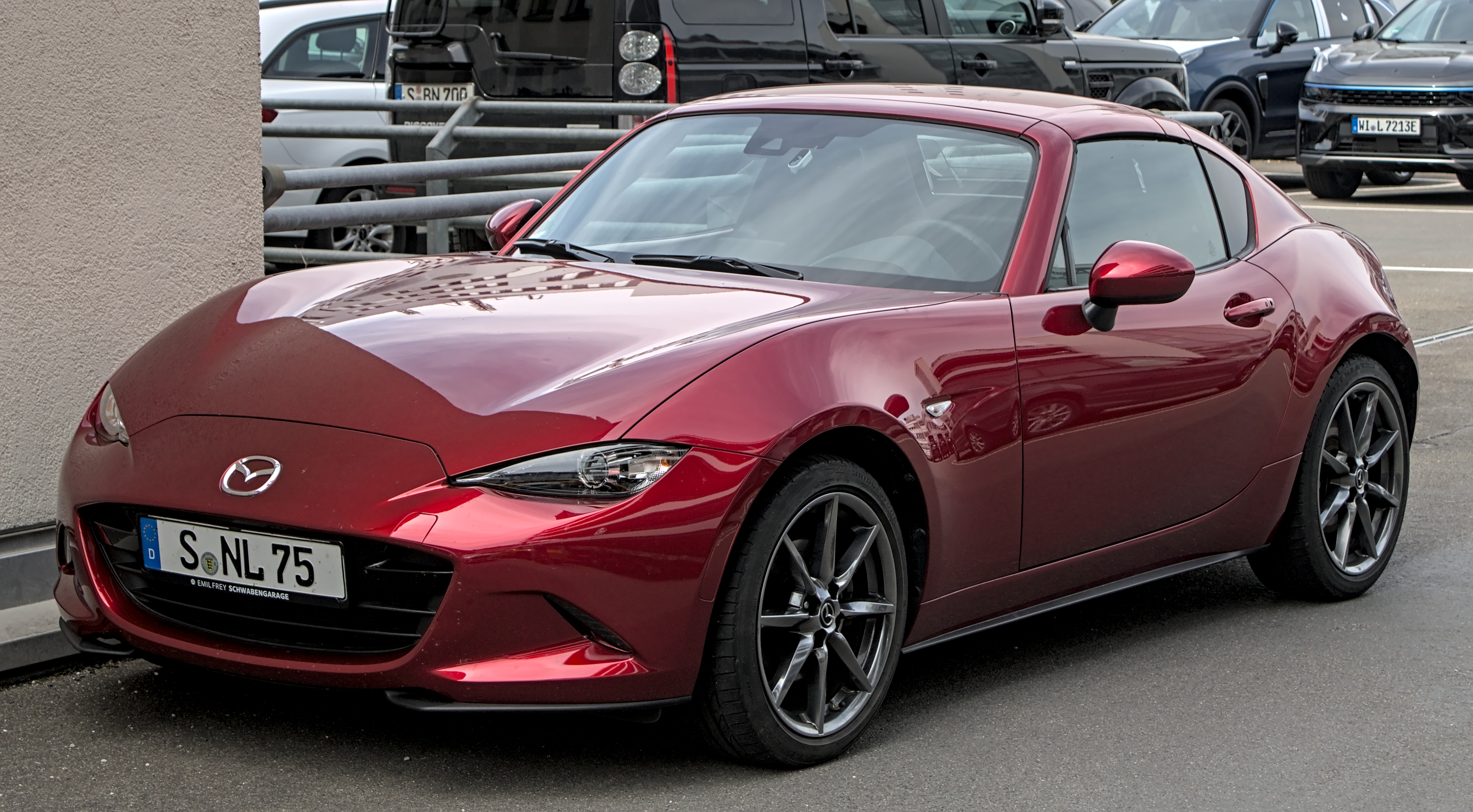
Mazda MX-5 RF (ND)

The fourth-generation Mazda MX-5 was unveiled in 2014 and has been in production since 2015. An updated model was introduced in 2019 and is visually identical to the pre-update model; the engine was upgraded to 135 kW (181 hp) and a dual-mass flywheel introduced to the powertrain in the manual transmission. The 2024 version received some minor tweaks.

The ND generation introduced a Retractable Fastback (RF) variant that features a rigid roof and buttresses that give the silhouette a more coupé-like appearance than the soft top convertible. The fourth generation MX-5 has received several accolades such as the 2015-2016 Car of the Year Japan Award, the 2016 World Car of the Year Award, Car and Driver's 10Best list from 2016 to 2019, and the Red Dot Best of the Best Award in Product Design 2017. In addition, the car is the basis for the Fiat 124 Spider and Abarth 124 Spider.

== Production numbers and details ==
In 2000, the Guinness Book of World Records declared the MX-5 the best-selling two-seat sports car in history, with a then total production of 531,890 units. The 250,000th MX-5 rolled out of the factory on November 9, 1992; the 500,000th, on February 8, 1999; the 750,000th, in March 2004; the 800,000th in January 2007, and the 900,000th in February 2011.

On April 22, 2016, Mazda produced its one millionth MX-5. It was displayed in several cities, where the first 240 people present could sign it before it went to the next destination.

Calendar year	Production	Sales									Model
Calendar year	Production	US	Canada	Mexico	Australia	UK	Europe	Japan	Others	Global	Model
1988	12										(pre-production cars)
1989	45,266	23,052	2,827		657		4	9,307		35,847	First Generation (NA) (Total Production 431,506)
1990	95,640	35,944	3,906		1,455	2,246	9,267	25,226		75,798	First Generation (NA) (Total Production 431,506)
1991	63,434	31,240	2,956		698	1,986	14,050	22,594		71,538	First Generation (NA) (Total Production 431,506)
1992	52,712	24,964	2,277		499	1,017	6,632	18,648		53,020	First Generation (NA) (Total Production 431,506)
1993	44,743	21,588	1,501		453	910	4,824	16,779		45,145	First Generation (NA) (Total Production 431,506)
1994	39,623	21,400	1,173		404	1,250	5,019	10,828		38,824	First Generation (NA) (Total Production 431,506)
1995	31,886	20,174	934		196	2,495	7,174	7,171		35,649	First Generation (NA) (Total Production 431,506)
1996	33,610	18,408	558		241	3,855	9,585	4,413		33,201	First Generation (NA) (Total Production 431,506)
1997	24,580(NA)+ 2,457(NB)	17,218	594		206	4,956	10,480	3,537		32,035	First Generation (NA) (Total Production 431,506)
1998	58,682	19,845	1,045		1,310	6,307	16,831	10,174		49,205	Second Generation (NB) (Total Production 290,123)
1999	44,851	17,738	1,198		1,354	6,411	21,130	4,952	30	46,402	Second Generation (NB) (Total Production 290,123)
2000	47,496	18,299	1,328		1,038	5,199	19,268	4,644	33	44,610	Second Generation (NB) (Total Production 290,123)
2001	38,870	16,486	1,271		924	3,720	16,368	4,211	6	39,266	Second Generation (NB) (Total Production 290,123)
2002	40,754	14,392	1,230		698	7,162	19,670	2,934	34	38,958	Second Generation (NB) (Total Production 290,123)
2003	30,106	10,920	1,079		540	9,097	18,934	1,520	11	33,004	Second Generation (NB) (Total Production 290,123)
2004	24,232	9,356	1,146		483	6,372	13,885	1,646	248	26,764	Second Generation (NB) (Total Production 290,123)
2005	2,675(NB)+ 27,275(NC)	9,801	857		743	5,182	9,852	3,657	353	25,263	Third Generation (NC) (Total Production 231,632)
2006	48,389	16,897	1,582	223	1,468	8,593	19,402	4,067	827	44,243	Third Generation (NC) (Total Production 231,632)
2007	37,022	15,075	1,814	261	1,170	9,234	18,899	3,845	772	41,575	Third Generation (NC) (Total Production 231,632)
2008	22,886	10,977	1,407	179	639	6,109	13,252	1,858	610	28,743	Third Generation (NC) (Total Production 231,632)
2009	19,341	7,917	850	119	521	4,698	9,709	1,947	1,195	22,139	Third Generation (NC) (Total Production 231,632)
2010	20,554	6,370	736	149	440	5,157	10,317	1,120	1,083	20,066	Third Generation (NC) (Total Production 231,632)
2011	14,995	5,674	612	176	315	3,660	8,147	1,104	730	16,582	Third Generation (NC) (Total Production 231,632)
2012	15,400	6,305	711	145	159	3,342	7,207	941	513	15,836	Third Generation (NC) (Total Production 231,632)
2013	11,639	5,780	554	186	178	3,285	6,113	768	377	13,770	Third Generation (NC) (Total Production 231,632)
2014	12,246	4,745	511	154	118	2,982	5,786	491	296	12,162	Third Generation (NC) (Total Production 231,632)
2015	1,885(NC)+ 30,022(ND)	8,591	630	480	917		6,746	8,509		26,508	Fourth Generation (ND)
2016	40,101	9,465	903	1,317			13,677	6,126		34,567	Fourth Generation (ND)
2017	38,861	11,294	1,067	1,769			15,769	7,005		39,773	Fourth Generation (ND)
2018	27,452	8,971	615	1,072			13,703	5,331		31,938	Fourth Generation (ND)
2019		7,753	774	1,101			13,803			31,000	Fourth Generation (ND)
2020		8,807	520	793			4,815			27,000	Fourth Generation (ND)
Total	1,089,697	465,437	35,287	8,124	17,824	115,225	377,064	168,378	7,118	1,123,399	

== Legacy and recognition ==
The MX-5 has won numerous awards, including Wheels Magazine's Car of the Year for 1989, 2005 and 2016; Sports Car International's "best sports car of the 1990s" and "ten best sports cars of all time"; 2005–2006 Car of the Year Japan; and 2005 Australian Car of the Year. The MX-5 has also made Car and Driver magazine's annual 10 Best list 17 times. In their December 2009 issue, Grassroots Motorsports magazine named the MX-5 as the most important sports car built during the previous 25 years. As production continues and generations are added, the core idea, dimensions and basic technology remain, with technological advancements added with each revised version, while adhering to the original goals that led to its creation.

In 2009, English automotive critic Jeremy Clarkson wrote:

The fact is that if you want a sports car, the MX-5 is perfect. Nothing on the road will give you better value. Nothing will give you so much fun. The only reason I'm giving it five stars is because I can't give it fourteen.

=== Awards ===
- Automobile Magazine 1990 "Automobile of the Year" and "All-Stars" list in 2016.
- Car and Driver's 10Best list from 1990-1992, 1998-1999, 2001, 2006-2013, 2016-2019.
- Car of the Year Japan Award 2005-2006 and 2015-2016.
- 2006 World Car of the Year Awards: "World Car of the Year" Finalist.
- 2012 Autocar Indonesia Reader's Choice Award, Favorite Convertible.
- What Car? Magazine 2014 Used Car of the Year - Best Fun Car.
- Yahoo! Autos 2016 Fresh Ride of the Year.
- Roadshow by CNET Editors Choice Best Convertibles 2016.
- World Car of the Year at the 2016 World Car Awards (UK).
- 2016 World Car of the Year Awards: "World Car of the Year" and "World Car Design of the Year".
- 2016 UK Car of the Year.
- The Daily Telegraph 2016 Car of the Year.
- Auto Express 2017 Roadster of the Year.
- Red Dot Best of the Best Award: Product Design 2017.
- New York Daily News DNA Award 2018.
- What Car? Magazine 2018 Best Convertible Less Than £25,000.
- MotorWeek Drivers' Choice Awards Best Convertible 2018.
- 2018 RJC Car of the Year Special Award: Classic Car Restoration Service.
- Edmunds.com 2019 Editor's Choice Awards: Best Sports Car.
- Car and Driver 2024 Editor's Choice: Affordable Sports Car.
- iSeeCars named the Mazda MX-5 Miata as the top sports car that US owners keep the longest.

== Motorsport ==
Lightly modified MX-5s are a popular choice for amateur circuit racing. They are the basis of many spec racing series around the world, including:

- Spec Miata, a class of racing cars in the US
- Global MX-5 Cup, a Spec Miata series in the US sanctioned by IMSA
- MaX5 Racing Championship, a class of racing cars in the United Kingdom

== See also ==
- Simpson Design, US-based custom coachbuilder producing bodies and interior for the Miata MX-5
- Mazda MX-5 12R

== Bibliography ==
- Long, B. MX-5 Miata – The full story of the world's favourite sports car, Veloce Publishing, 2002. ISBN 1-903706-21-1.
- Carey, J. (March, 2005). "New Mazda MX-5". Wheels (Australia), p. 48.
