= Jason Wolfe (racing driver) =

American racing driver (born 1994)

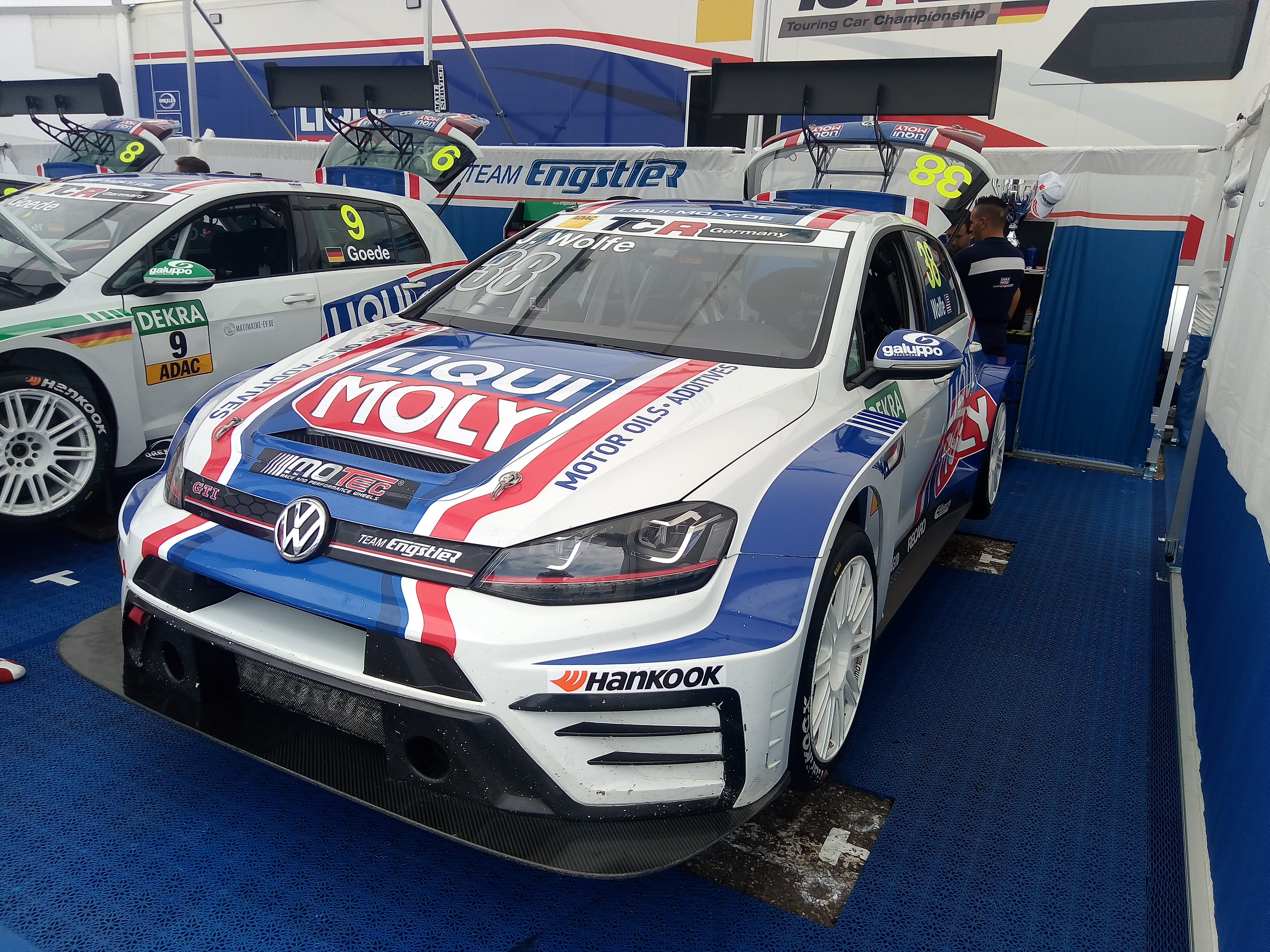
- Nationality: (United States) American
- Born: October 18, 1994 (age 32) Mount Vernon, Ohio, U.S.

ADAC TCR Germany Touring Car Championship career
- Debut season: 2017
- Current team: Team Engstler USA
- Car number: 38

Previous series
- 2014-2016 2012-2013 2011-2012: Pirelli World Challenge - TCA; USF2000; Formula Enterprises

Championship titles
- 2014-2015: Pirelli World Challenge - TCA

Jason Wolfe (born 18 October 1994 in Mount Vernon, Ohio) is an American racing driver. Wolfe previously competed in single seater series such as the USF2000 championship. Currently, Wolfe competes in the German-based ADAC TCR Germany Touring Car Championship.

== Racing career ==
=== Single seater career ===
In karting, Wolfe won the Yamaha Junior class with the Midstate Ohio Kart Club in 2009. Wolfe started single seaters in the SCCA Formula Enterprises class in 2010. The young driver finished second in the Great Lakes Division championship, behind the very experienced Scott Rettich. With these results, Wofle qualified for the SCCA National Championship Runoffs at Road America. The Ohio native finished in fourteenth place with his JAY Motorsports run car. For 2011, Wolfe competed in the SCCA Pro Formula Enterprises series finishing on the podium at Virginia International Raceway and Mid-Ohio Sports Car Course. Wolfe ended the championship third in the series standings, behind Rettich and Patrick Gallagher.

In 2012, Wolfe made his USF2000 debut at the 2012 U.S. F2000 Winterfest. His best result was a tenth place at Sebring. During the regular season, his best result was an eighth-place finish in the streets of Baltimore. First racing with JAY Motorsports, Wolfe switched to Pabst Racing for the 2013 U.S. F2000 Winterfest and regular season. Tõnis Kasemets joined Wolfe as his engineer scoring a third place at Mid-Ohio.

=== Pirelli World Challenge ===
Racing with Kinetic Motorsports, Wolfe joined the Pirelli World Challenge TCA class racing a Kia Forte Coupe. Wolfe won five races during the season, claiming the title in his debut season. Shea Holbrook finished second in points. Wolfe defended his title in 2015, remaining with Kinetic Motorsports. Looking for sponsors, Wolfe ran a partial 2016 season winning a number of races. As he ran a limited schedule, he could not defend his TCA title. Wolfe also won one race in the GTS class racing a GT4-spec KTM X-Bow.

=== ADAC TCR Germany Touring Car Championship ===
Looking for a better touring car racing option Wolfe moved to Europe. Joining Engstler Motorsport Wolfe raced one of the teams Volkswagen Golf cars. The young American scored his first victory after Niels Langeveld received a thirty-second penalty in the first race at Zandvoort. Wolfe scored his second podium of the season in the second race at Zandvoort.

== Motorsports results ==
=== SCCA National Championship Runoffs ===
Year	Track	Car	Engine	Class	Finish	Start	Status
2010	Road America	Van Diemen DP06	Mazda	Formula Enterprises	14	8	Not running
2011	Road America	Van Diemen DP06	Mazda	Formula Enterprises	2	2	Running
2012	Road America	Spec Racer	Ford	Spec Racer Ford	15	24	Running
2012	Road America	Van Diemen DP06	Mazda	Formula Enterprises	2	3	Running

=== American Open-Wheel racing results ===
(key) (Races in bold indicate pole position, races in italics indicate fastest race lap)

==== SCCA Pro Formula Enterprises ====
Year	Entrant	1	2	3	4	5	6	7	8	9	10	Pos	Points
2011	JAY Motorsports	VIR; 3	VIR; 3	MOS; 4	MOS; Ret	BIR; 5	BIR; 2	MID; 2	MID; 2	ATL; Ret	ATL; 7	3rd	992

==== USF2000 National Championship ====
Year	Entrant	1	2	3	4	5	6	7	8	9	10	11	12	13	14	Pos	Points
2012	JAY Motorsports	SEB; 14	SEB; 34	STP; 19	STP; 9	LOR; 10	MOH; 12	MOH; 29	ROA; 26	ROA; 14	ROA; 23	BAL; 10	BAL; 10	VIR; 25	VIR; 13	13th	84
2013	Pabst Racing	SEB; 8	SEB; 7	STP; 7	STP; 7	LOR; 7	TOR; 29	TOR; 24	MOH; 3	MOH; 9	MOH; 20	LAG; 9	LAG; 8	HOU; 7	HOU; 18	8th	148
