= SCCA Spec Racer Ford Pro Series =

Sports car racing series

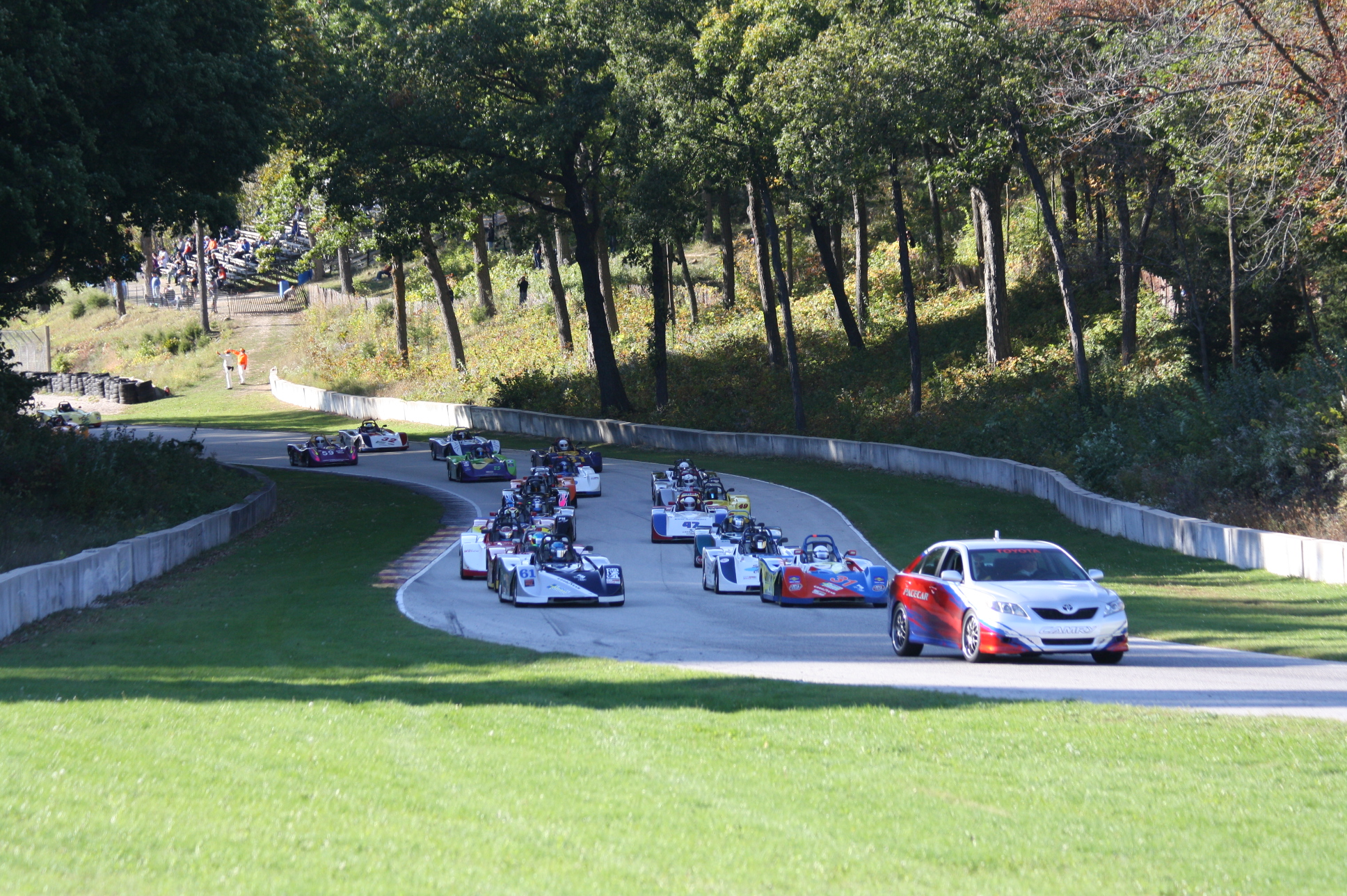
- Field for the 2010 SCCA National Runoffs
- Category: Spec formula sports car racing
- Country: United States
- Inaugural season: 1994
- Folded: 2011
- Constructors: SCCA Enterprises
- Engine suppliers: Ford
- Tyre suppliers: Goodyear Eagle
- Last Drivers' champion: Scott Rettich (2011)
- Last Teams' champion: Alliance Autosport (2011)

The SCCA Spec Racer Ford Pro Series was a sports car racing series in the United States. The series existed between 1994 and 2002 the series was revived for 2010 and 2011.

== History ==
=== Early years ===
The Spec Racer Ford was introduced in 1994 after Renault pulled out of the Spec Racer project. SCCA Pro Racing introduced the pro series soon after Ford wanted to support the Spec Racer. The first season saw fields of around 25 cars. David Tenney won the first ever Spec Racer Ford Pro Series race on July 2, 1994 at the Des Moines Street Circuit. Tenney won the race after a lengthy battle for the lead with Keith Scharf. The second race at Watkins Glen International marked the first win of many for Warren Stillwell, who would win numerous races in Spec Racer Ford classes. Stillwell took the inaugural championship with one race left in the championship. Keith Scharf finished second in the championship followed by Bob Boudinot.

Warrenn Stillwell repeated his championship in 1995 again taking the championship one race early.

=== Golden Era ===
For the 1996 season the fields exploded, 55 cars were entered in the first race, only 45 could start. The 1994 and 1995 seasons saw only 5 races on the calendar, two races were added for 1996. Many drivers were in fact amateur racers making their pro racing debut. The sheer number of cars in combination with a street circuit resulted in 18 cars crashing at the Grand Prix of Minnesota. James Goughary Jr. won the race and went on to win the championship with Keith Scharf finishing second and Warren Stillwell finishing third in the championship.

The following season, 1997, saw nine races on the calendar including 2 double-headers. Stillwell retook the crown, winning four races. He was closely followed by Robert Mumm, only 2 points made the difference in the end. The races were not very tense, only 11 lead changes throughout the season with 6 races seeing no lead changes. The sixth round of the championship at Heartland Park was an exception with 7 lead changes. There were only 0.210 seconds between the winning driver (Robbert Mumm) and the number two (Leo Capaldi), with Stillwell finishing third.

For 1998 the SCCA Pro Racing shortened the calendar to 7 races. The championship was decided in the final round. At the final round the Spec Racer Ford Pro Series supported the FIA GT World Schampionships at Homestead-Miami Speedway. Going in the final round John Strickler had scored 96 points and Stillwell 93. Qualifying was close with Strickler on pole position and Stillwell starting fourth. During the race Stillwell crashed in the 11th round and Strickler went on to win the race and the championship.

1999 saw again large fields with an average of 36 cars per race. Jack Willes decided the championship in the prefinal round at Watkins Glen International. The battle for the second place in the championship was tight. This was decided during the final round at Sebring International Raceway. With Goughary, Jr. and Tilbor competing for second place. Goughary finished third, in front of Tilbor who was fourth, thus winning the second place in the championship.

With fields still as large as before and relative rookies competing for top honors the series was still going strong into the new millennium. Stillwell decided the championship, in his signature style, one race early. New in the top three were second placed Bobby Sak and third placed John Black.

In its eighth season, in 2001, the series supported the Trans-Am Series, SCCA World Challenge and the NASCAR Winston Cup Series at Sears Point Raceway. Keith Scharf took the title after nine rounds of racing. Stillwell was on course to win his fifth title, but he lost valuable points when he had to sit out round five. Round five was the only oval racing event on the calendar. At Chicago Motor Speedway, supporting the ASA National Tour, only 17 cars started the race. Scharf started from pole and won the 50 lap race, thus gaining points on championship fore runners Stillwell and Goughary Jr. who did not start the race. Scharf did not finish outside the top six and took his first title.

Stillwell retook the title in 2002, winning three races and capturing seven podium finishes out of ten races.

=== Cancellation ===
For the 2003 season the series was split up in an Atlantic Tour and a Pacific Tour. But instead of creating a series where drivers from the whole country could compete for the title, fields were split in half. May 20, 2003 SCCA Pro Racing canceled the remainder of the Atlantic and Pacific Tours. Shawn Morrison was the last driver to win a Pro Spec Racer event.

=== Revival ===
The Spec Racer Ford Pro Series was revived by the SCCA in 2010. The series was launched together with the SCCA Pro Formula Enterprises. In the new racing format every race-weekend features two races. 57 drivers entered the first race at Road Atlanta. Of the 52 drivers who started the race, Brian Schofield finished first with a margin of 0.145 seconds over Tray Ayres. For the second raceweekend, at Thunderbolt Raceway, fields were drastically smaller with 18 cars on the grid. Scott Rettich took his first Pro Spec Racer win. A record low competitor count was achieved at Brainerd International Raceway, only 12 drivers joined the grid. After ten races Rettich took the title with five point separating him from the number two Ayres.

The series was renewed for a second season in 2011. The season would be a disappointing one from an organizer point of view. The largest field was at the Grand Prix de Trois-Rivières with 21 cars, the smallest however was just five cars at the season finale at Road Atlanta. Tray Ayres would win, what would be the last, Pro SRF race. Rettich won three races and won the championship. SRF veteran Richard Spicer won four races, but had less podium finishes, thus he finished second in the standings.

Five days after the last race of the season, SCCA Pro Racing announced that the Pro Spec Ford and the Pro Formula Enterprises would not return in 2012. The organisation stated that the series was not viable in the current economic environment.

== The car ==
The Spec Racer Ford is an open cockpit sportsracer produced by SCCA Enterprises. The car features a 1.9L Ford Escort engine in the rear. The engine is an inline-4 SOHC with 8 valves with a Hemi head. The engine produces 105 horsepower.

The car has a tube frame chassis. The bodywork is made out of fiberglass. The gearbox is a transaxle type and features five forward speeds and one reverse.

== Champions ==
| Year | Driver | Team | Car Avg. |
|---|---|---|---|
| 1994 | (Ohio) Warren Stillwell | Stillwell Racing | 27,80 |
| 1995 | (Ohio) Warren Stillwell | Stillwell Racing | 27,40 |
| 1996 | (Florida) James Goughary Jr. | | 42,60 |
| 1997 | (Ohio) Warren Stillwell | Stillwell Racing | 34,67 |
| 1998 | (Kansas) John Strickler | Mattress City Racing | 23,28 |
| 1999 | (North Carolina) Jack Willes | Willes Racing | 36,11 |
| 2000 | (Ohio) Warren Stillwell | Stillwell Racing | 30,72 |
| 2001 | (Missouri) Keith Scharf | ??? | 27,38 |
| 2002 | (Ohio) Warren Stillwell | Stillwell Racing | 33,67 |
| 2003^{1} | (California) Lee Fleming (Pacific), | ??? | 15 |
| 2003^{1} | (Maryland) Richard Spicer (Atlantic) | ??? | 4 |
2004-2009 no competition
| 2010 | (Ohio) Scott Rettich | Hippi Racing | 22,50 |
| 2011 | (Ohio) Scott Rettich | Alliance Autosport | ??? |

=== Notes ===
^1 This reflects the standings at the date of cancellation, these standings are not official.

== Venues ==
| Track | 1994 | 1995 | 1996 | 1997 | 1998 | 1999 | 2000 | 2001 | 2002 | 2003 | 2010 | 2011 |
|---|---|---|---|---|---|---|---|---|---|---|---|---|
| (Iowa) Des Moines Street Circuit | | | | | | | | | | | | |
| (New York (state)) Watkins Glen | | | | | | | | | | | | |
| (Canada) Mosport | | | | | | | | | | (Atlantic) | | |
| (Georgia (U.S. state)) Road Atlanta | | | | | | | | | | | | |
| (Texas) Dallas Grand Prix | | | | | | | | | | | | |
| (Arizona) Phoenix International Raceway | | | | | | | | | | (Pacific) | | |
| (Kansas) Heartland Park | | | | | | | | | | | | |
| (Florida) Sebring International Raceway | | | | | | | | | | | | |
| (Minnesota) Minneapolis Street Circuit | | | | | | | | | | | | |
| (Nevada) Reno Hilton Street Circuit | | | | | | | | | | | | |
| (Florida) St. Petersburg Street Circuit | | | | | | | | | | | | |
| Mid-Ohio Sports Car Course | | | | | | | | | | | | |
| (Colorado) Pikes Peak International Raceway | | | | | | | | | | | | |
| West Michigan Grand Prix | | | | | Winner: John Strickler | Winner: Neil Tilbor | | | | | | |
| (Florida) Homestead-Miami Speedway | | | | | | | | | | | | |
| (Oklahoma) Hallett Motor Racing Circuit | | | | | | | | | | | | |
| (Tennessee) Memphis International Raceway | | | | | | | | | | | | |
| (Canada) Circuit St. Croix | | | | | | | | | | | | |
| (Connecticut) Lime Rock Park | | | | | | | | | | (Atlantic)^{1} | | |
| (Nevada) Las Vegas Motor Speedway | | | | | | | | | | | | |
| (California) Sonoma Raceway | | | | | | | | | | (Pacific)^{1} | | |
| (Illinois) Chicago Motor Speedway | | | | | | | | | ^{2} | | | |
| Virginia International Raceway | | | | | | | | | | | | |
| (Ohio) Lunken Airport | | | | | | | | | | | | |
| (Florida) Daytona International Speedway | | | | | | | | ^{3} | | | | |
| (Iowa) Mid America Motorplex | | | | | | | | | | | | |
| (Pennsylvania) BeaveRun Motorsports Complex | | | | | | | | | | (Atlantic) | | |
| (South Carolina) Carolina Motorsports Park | | | | | | | | | | (Atlantic)^{1} | | |
| (Michigan) Gingerman Raceway | | | | | | | | | | (Atlantic)^{1} | | |
| (California) Willow Springs International Raceway | | | | | | | | | | (Pacific)^{1} | | |
| (Washington (state)) Pacific Raceways | | | | | | | | | | (Pacific)^{1} | | |
| (Canada) Circuit Trois-Rivières | | | | | | | | | | | | |
| (Minnesota) Brainerd International Raceway | | | | | | | | | | | | |
| New Jersey Motorsports Park | | | | | | | | | | | | |
| (Utah) Miller Motorsports Park | | | | | | | | | | | | |

Legend
| Red | Permanent road course |
| Green | Temporary circuit |
| Blank | Oval |

=== Notes ===
^1 These events were canceled after the series cancelation.
^2 Speedway chairman (Charles Bidwill) and president (Chip Ganassi) declared the races would not be financially feasible.
^3 This event was canceled after the September 11 attacks.

== Records ==
- Most races: Warren Stillwell and Neil Tilbor (65)
- Most wins: Warren Stillwell (21)
- Most podium finishes: Warren Stillwell (43)
- Most pole positions: Warren Stillwell (34)
- Most wins at a single track: Warren Stillwell at Mid-Ohio Sports Car Course and Mosport Park (5)
- Most wins in a single season: 4 by Warren Stillwell in 1997, by Jack Willes in 1999, and by Richard Spicer in 2010
- Smallest margin of victory: 0.011 seconds, Warren Stillwell over Herb Sweeney, IV at Lime Rock Park, October 12, 2002
- Largest margin of victory: 18.610 seconds, John Black over Keith Scharf at Circuit St. Croix, August 20, 2000
- Highest number of entries: April 10, 2010, Road Atlanta (57, 52 starters)
- Lowest number of entries: November 6, 2011, Road Atlanta (5)
