= 2011 SCCA Pro Formula Enterprises season =

Seasons
- ← 2010 none →

The 2011 SCCA Pro Formula Enterprises season was the second, and last, season of the SCCA Pro Formula Enterprises. The series was sanctioned by SCCA Pro Racing. All drivers competed in Mazda powered, Hoosier shod Van Diemen DP06's.

== Race calendar and results ==
| Round | Circuit | Location | Date | Pole position | Fastest lap | Winning driver |
|---|---|---|---|---|---|---|
| 1 | Virginia International Raceway | (United States) Alton, Virginia | May 14 | (United States) Scott Rettich | (United States) Scott Rettich | (United States) Scott Rettich |
| 2 | Virginia International Raceway | (United States) Alton, Virginia | May 15 | (United States) Scott Rettich | (United States) Scott Rettich | (United States) Scott Rettich |
| 3 | Mosport | (Canada) Bowmanville, Ontario | May 21 | (United States) Scott Rettich | (United States) Scott Rettich | (United States) Scott Rettich |
| 4 | Mosport | (Canada) Bowmanville, Ontario | May 22 | (United States) Scott Rettich | (United States) Patrick Gallagher | (United States) Scott Rettich |
| 5 | Brainerd International Raceway | (United States) Brainerd, Minnesota | September 3 | (United States) Scott Rettich | (United States) Scott Rettich | (United States) Scott Rettich |
| 6 | Brainerd International Raceway | (United States) Brainerd, Minnesota | September 4 | (United States) Scott Rettich | (United States) Scott Rettich | (United States) Scott Rettich |
| 7 | Mid-Ohio Sports Car Course | (United States) Lexington, Ohio | July 5 | (United States) Scott Rettich | (United States) Scott Rettich | (United States) Scott Rettich |
| 8 | Mid-Ohio Sports Car Course | (United States) Lexington, Ohio | July 6 | (United States) Scott Rettich | (United States) Scott Rettich | (United States) Scott Rettich |
| 9 | Road Atlanta | (United States) Atlanta, Georgia | August 2 | (United States) Jason Wolfe | (United States) Jason Wolfe | (United States) Scott Rettich |
| 10 | Road Atlanta | (United States) Atlanta, Georgia | August 3 | (United States) Jason Wolfe | (United States) Scott Rettich | (United States) Matt Schneider |

== Final standings ==
| Pos. | Driver | (United States) VIR | | (Canada) MOS | | (United States) BRA | | (United States) MOH | | (United States) ATL | | Points |
|---|---|---|---|---|---|---|---|---|---|---|---|---|
| 1 | (United States) Scott Rettich | 1 | 1 | 1 | 1 | 1 | 1 | 1 | 1 | 1 | 12 | 1307 |
| 2 | (United States) Patrick Gallagher | 2 | 2 | 2 | 2 | 2 | 5 | 3 | 3 | 2 | 10 | 1102 |
| 3 | (United States) Jason Wolfe | 3 | 3 | 4 | Ret | 5 | 2 | 2 | 2 | Ret | 7 | 992 |
| 4 | (United States) Jim Libecco | 4 | 4 | 11 | 3 | 3 | 3 | 4 | 4 | 6 | Ret | 930 |
| 5 | (United States) Matt Schneider | 5 | 5 | 3 | 4 | 4 | 4 | 5 | 5 | Ret | 1 | 896 |
| 6 | (United States) Tilden Kinlaw | 9 | 13 | 7 | 8 | 6 | 9 | 7 | 7 | 4 | 11 | 797 |
| 7 | (United States) Eric Cruz | 8 | 10 | 9 | 9 | 8 | 8 | 9 | 8 | 8 | 4 | 796 |
| 8 | (United States) Patrick Linn | 10 | 12 | 8 | 7 | 10 | 10 | 6 | 6 | Ret | 3 | 786 |
| 9 | (United States) Shaun Miller | 12 | 9 | 6 | 5 | 9 | 6 | | | 5 | 2 | 687 |
| 10 | (United States) Andrew Cross Jr. | Ret | 14 | | | | | 8 | 9 | 9 | 5 | 436 |
| 11 | (United States) Paul Schneider | 7 | 6 | | | | | | | 3 | 6 | 362 |
| 12 | (United States) Lee Rackley | 6 | 8 | 10 | 6 | | | | | | | 332 |
| 13 | (United States) Eric Fagan | Ret | 8 | 5 | 11 | | | | | | | 303 |
| 14 | (United States) Jed Copham | | | | | 7 | 7 | | | | | 168 |
| 15 | (United States) Chris LoCurto | | | | | | | | | 10 | Ret | 148 |
| 16 | (United States) Wally Osinga | | | | | | | | | 11 | Ret | 148 |
| 17 | (United States) Joel Janco | | | | | | | | | 7 | Ret | 140 |
| 18 | (United States) Joseph Wolf | 11 | 11 | | | | | | | | | 136 |
| 19 | (United States) Curt Harrelson | | | | | | | | | Ret | Ret | 113 |
| 20 | (United States) Mark Eaton | | | | | | | | | 15 | DNS | 2 |
| | (United States) Sam Beasley | | | | | | | | | | | |
| | (United States) Jay Leeman | | | | | | | | | | | |
| | (United States) Kenneth Martin | | | | | | | | | | | |
| | (United States) Carl Przyborowski | | | | | | | | | | | |
| | (United States) Travis Ward | | | | | | | | | | | |
| | (United States) Randy Youngma | | | | | | | | | | | |
