= 2010 SCCA Pro Formula Enterprises season =

Seasons
- ← 2004 2011 →

The 2010 SCCA Pro Formula Enterprises season was the inaugural season of the SCCA Pro Formula Enterprises. The series was sanctioned by SCCA Pro Racing. All drivers competed in Mazda powered, Hoosier shod Van Diemen DP06's.

Sean Rayhall won the championship in the final round of the season over Scott Rettich.

== Race calendar and results ==
Round	Circuit	Location	Date	Pole position	Fastest lap	Winning driver
1	Road Atlanta	(United States) Braselton, Georgia	April 10	(United States) Sean Rayhall	(United States) Sean Rayhall	(United States) Nick Evans
2	Road Atlanta	(United States) Braselton, Georgia	April 11	(United States) Sean Rayhall	(United States) Sean Rayhall	(United States) Scott Rettich
3	New Jersey Motorsports Park	(United States) Millville, New Jersey	May 8	(United States) Sean Rayhall	(United States) Sean Rayhall	(United States) Sean Rayhall
4	New Jersey Motorsports Park	(United States) Millville, New Jersey	May 9	(United States) Sean Rayhall	(United States) Sean Rayhall	(United States) Sean Rayhall
5	Miller Motorsports Park	(United States) Tooele, Utah	June 5	(United States) Sean Rayhall	(United States) Sean Rayhall	(United States) Sean Rayhall
6	Miller Motorsports Park	(United States) Tooele, Utah	June 6	(United States) Sean Rayhall	(United States) Sean Rayhall	(United States) Sean Rayhall
7	Brainerd International Raceway	(United States) Brainerd, Minnesota	September 3	(United States) Sean Rayhall	(United States) Scott Rettich	(United States) Scott Rettich
8	Brainerd International Raceway	(United States) Brainerd, Minnesota	September 4	(United States) Sean Rayhall	(United States) Sean Rayhall	(United States) Sean Rayhall
9	Virginia International Raceway	(United States) Alton, Virginia	September 10	(United States) Scott Rettich	(United States) Scott Rettich	(United States) Scott Rettich
10	Virginia International Raceway	(United States) Alton, Virginia	September 11	(United States) Scott Rettich	(United States) Sean Rayhall	(United States) Sean Rayhall

== Final standings ==
Pos.	Driver	(United States) ATL		(United States) NJMP		(United States) MIL		(United States) BIR		(United States) VIR		Points
1	(United States) Sean Rayhall	4	Ret	1	1	1	1	2	1	Ret	1	1203
2	(United States) Scott Rettich	3	1	2	2	2	3	1	7	1	2	1180
3	(United States) Paul Schneider	6	3	6	7	Ret	7	4	2	2	6	940
4	(United States) Brian Novak	5	8	Ret	6	4	4	7	6	3	5	886
5	(United States) Matt Schneider	7	2	4	5	Ret		5	3	4	3	856
6	(United States) Jim Libecco	12	Ret	7	8			3	5	5	4	670
7	(United States) Matthew Mair	2	4	5	3	3	2					629
8	(United States) Wally Osinga	14	12	11	10	7	5			6	8	604
9	(United States) Lee Rackley	8	7	8	9	Ret				7	7	552
10	(United States) Tilden Kinlaw	10	6	9	13					8	Ret	440
11	(United States) Andrew Cross Jr.	Ret	Ret	12	14					Ret	9	368
12	(United States) Nick Evans	1	Ret	3	4	Ret						360
13	(United States) Robert Mumm	9	5					6	4			352
14	(United States) Eric Cruz	Ret	DNS							Ret	10	198
15	(United States) Chuck Raggio					6	6					176
16	(United States) Jed Copham							8	Ret			160
17	(United States) Brandon Aleckson					5	Ret					149
18	(United States) Thomas Green	11	9									144
19	(United States) Johnathan Corsico			10	12							136
20	(United States) Stephen Zamborsky	13	11									128
21	(Lebanon) Roger Feghali			Ret	11							124
22	(United States) Steve Stadel	Ret	10									116
23	(United States) Tyler Hunter					Ret	DNS					80
24	(United States) Randall Stanley	15	DNS									53
	(United States) Mick Robinson											
