= 2014 Pirelli World Challenge =

Seasons
- ← 2013 2015 →

The 2014 Pirelli World Challenge season was the 25th season of the Pirelli World Challenge championship. It marked the debut of a new "Touring Car A-Spec" class. A new "GT A-Spec" class also made its debut. These new classes featured amateur drivers. The series also held a round at Brainerd International Raceway for the first time in its history, with a touring car doubleheader held in support of a Trans Am Series event; also making its series debut was Barber Motorsports Park. The GT groups competed in sixteen fifty-minute sprints on nine circuits. The touring cars competed in fourteen sprints on seven road courses. The first race for GT cars at St. Petersburg was canceled due to heavy rain, so a make-up race was added for the series finale at Miller Motorsports Park. The second race for touring cars at Barber was also canceled due to rain, so a make-up race was added to the schedule at Mosport.

In the GT championship, three wins at the first four meetings – at Long Beach and a double at Belle Isle – along with consistent finishing thereafter was enough to give Johnny O'Connell a third consecutive series title at the wheel of his Cadillac CTS-V. O'Connell finished 156 points clear of his closest championship rival, Mike Skeen, who also won three races during the season; he achieved a double victory at Road America along with a win at Sonoma Raceway, driving an Audi R8 LMS ultra. The championship top three was completed by Anthony Lazzaro at the wheel of a Ferrari 458 GT3. Lazzaro finished 30 points behind Skeen, taking victories at Barber Motorsports Park and the second race at Sonoma Raceway. Seven other drivers won race in the class in 2014; the only driver to win more than one race was Ryan Dalziel, who took a double win at Mid-Ohio. Single race victories were taken by Andrew Palmer (Barber Motorsports Park) and Tomáš Enge (St. Petersburg), while the Toronto races were won by Kuno Wittmer and Nick Tandy, and the Miller Motorsports Park races were won by Robert Thorne and Guy Smith. The GTA class held within the GT championship was won by Michael Mills, who finished in eighth place in the overall GT standings. Cadillac won the Manufacturers' Championship by five points ahead of Audi.

In the GTS class, four-time race winner Lawson Aschenbach took his second straight series title, finishing 50 points clear of his closest competitor, Jack Baldwin, who won three races. Both drivers took advantage of Mark Wilkins suffering a pointless final weekend at Miller Motorsports Park, which dropped him 108 points behind Aschenbach in the final standings. Wilkins had finished each of the previous races in the top ten, including victories at Barber Motorsports Park and Toronto. Dean Martin took a double victory at Belle Isle and added a third victory in Toronto en route to fourth in the championship. Niclas Jönsson also achieved a double victory – at Road America – having previously won at Long Beach, but no points in the final four races of the season dropped him to seventh in the final championship standings. The season's only other winner was Nick Esayian, who won the first race at Miller Motorsports Park. In the Manufacturers' Championship, Kia claimed the title by six points ahead of Ford.

In TC, only Michael DiMeo was able to win more than two races during the season, but his eight victories allowed him to win the class title by nearly 500 points over Karl Thomson, who was a race winner at Brainerd. Third place, a further 82 points in arrears, was Adam Poland, who won races at Road America and Miller Motorsports Park. Steven Doherty won the other races at Road America and Miller Motorsports Park en route to fourth in the championship, while the other Brainerd race winner was Fred Emich, who finished fifth in the championship. Honda comfortably won the Manufacturers' Championship. TCA class honors were taken by Jason Wolfe, who won five races on his way to the championship. Wolfe finished 207 points clear of another five-time winner, Shea Holbrook, while a further 24 points behind in third place was Ernie Francis, Jr., who won a trio of races, including a double at Brainerd. Aside from his GTS foray, Jönsson achieved a victory at Miller Motorsports Park. Kia won the Manufacturers' Championship on a tie-break with Honda, by six wins to five.

TCB championship honors went to Brian Price, at the wheel of a Honda Fit. Price won four races at the first three meetings – Barber Motorsports Park, Canadian Tire Motorsport Park and New Jersey Motorsports Park – and added a fifth win at the final meeting at Miller Motorsports Park. Price won the title by 125 points ahead of Nathan Stacy, who was the other winner at Canadian Tire Motorsport Park. Third place went to Tyler Palmer, 58 points behind Stacy, taking victories at New Jersey Motorsports Park and Mid-Ohio. The season's other multiple winner was Johan Schwartz, who won three of the final four races at Brainerd and Miller Motorsports Park. The season's other winners were Glenn Nixon at Road America, and Chase Pelletier at Mid-Ohio. In the Manufacturers' Championship, Honda finished 25 points clear of the next best manufacturer, Mini.

== Schedule ==
Round	Date	Circuit	Location	Classes	Weekend
1	March 28–30	Streets of St. Petersburg	St. Petersburg, Florida	GT, GTS, GTA	IndyCar Series
2	April 11–13	Streets of Long Beach	Long Beach, California	GT, GTS, GTA	IndyCar Series / United SportsCar Championship
3	April 25–27	Barber Motorsports Park	Birmingham, Alabama	GT, GTS, GTA (x2); TC, TCA, TCB	IndyCar Series
4	May 16–18	Canadian Tire Motorsport Park	Bowmanville, Ontario	TC, TCA, TCB (x3)	NASCAR Canadian Tire Series / Trans Am Series
5	May 30 – June 1	The Raceway on Belle Isle	Detroit, Michigan	GT, GTS, GTA (x2)	IndyCar Series / United SportsCar Championship
6	May 30 – June 1	New Jersey Motorsports Park	Millville, New Jersey	TC, TCA, TCB (x2)	Trans Am Series
7	June 19–21	Road America	Elkhart Lake, Wisconsin	GT, GTS, GTA (x2); TC, TCA, TCB (x2)	NASCAR Nationwide Series
8	July 18–20	Streets of Toronto	Toronto, Ontario	GT, GTS, GTA (x2)	IndyCar Series
9	August 1–3	Mid-Ohio Sports Car Course	Lexington, Ohio	GT, GTS, GTA (x2); TC, TCA, TCB (x2)	IndyCar Series
10	August 22–24	Sonoma Raceway	Sonoma, California	GT, GTS, GTA (x2)	IndyCar Series
11	August 30–31	Brainerd International Raceway	Brainerd, Minnesota	TC, TCA, TCB (x2)	Trans Am Series
12	September 12–13	Miller Motorsports Park	Tooele, Utah	GT, GTS, GTA (x2); TC, TCA, TCB (x2)	NASCAR K&N Pro Series West

== News ==
On January 7, 2014, it was announced that Pirelli, WC Vision had agreed to a five-year extension to their Title and Official Tire Partnership for the World Challenge Championships.

On January 6, 2014, it was announced that the TV broadcast partnership with NBC Sports Network had been renewed for 2014.

On December 24, 2013, it was announced that the Reiter Engineering Lamborghini Gallardo FL2 GT3 would be homologated for competition.

On October 28, 2013, it was announced that the Porsche 911 GT3 R would be homologated for competition.

The March 29 race was canceled due to heavy rain. Only qualifying points were awarded.

== Entries ==
=== GT ===
Constructor	Team	Car	No.	Driver	Rounds
Aston Martin	(United States) TRG-AMR	Vantage GT3	15	(United States) Tomy Drissi	2
Audi	(United States) CRP Racing	R8 Ultra	2	(United States) Mike Skeen	2–3, 5, 7
Audi	(United States) Global Motorsports Group	R8 Ultra	14	(United States) James Sofronas	1–3, 5, 7
Audi	(United States) Global Motorsports Group	R8 Ultra	21	(United States) Andrew Palmer	1–3, 5, 7
Audi	(United States) Global Motorsports Group	R8 Ultra	32	(United States) Bret Curtis	1–3, 5
Audi	(United States) Global Motorsports Group	R8 Ultra	44	(United States) Brent Holden	2, 5
Audi	(United States) Global Motorsports Group	R8 Ultra	95	(United States) Bill Ziegler	1–3, 5, 7
Audi	(United States) JCR Motorsports	R8 Ultra	99	(United States) Jeff Coutney	1–3, 7
Bentley	(United Kingdom) Dyson Racing Team Bentley	Continental GT3	08	(United States) Butch Leitzinger	7
Bentley	(United Kingdom) Dyson Racing Team Bentley	Continental GT3	88	(United Kingdom) Guy Smith	TBC
BMW	(United States) Turner Motorsport	Z4 GT3	94	(United States) Dane Cameron	1
Cadillac	(United States) Cadillac Racing	CTS-V.R	3	(United States) Johnny O'Connell	1–3, 5, 7
Cadillac	(United States) Cadillac Racing	CTS-V.R	8	(United Kingdom) Andy Pilgrim	1–3, 5, 7
Dodge	(United States) Lone Star Racing	Viper GT3-R	80	(United States) Dan Knox	1–3, 5, 7
Ferrari	(United States) DragonSpeed	458 GT3	10	(Sweden) Henrik Hedman	1–3, 5, 7
Ferrari	(United States) DragonSpeed	458 GT3	64	(United States) Mike Hedlund	1–3
Ferrari	(United States) R. Ferri Motorsports	458 GT3	16	(United States) Nick Mancuso	1–3, 5, 7
Ferrari	(United States) R. Ferri Motorsports	458 GT3	61	(United States) Anthony Lazzaro	1–3, 5, 7
Lamborghini	(Germany) Reiter Engineering	Gallardo FL2	0	(Brazil) Marcelo Hahn	1, 3, 5, 7
Lamborghini	(Germany) Reiter Engineering	Gallardo FL2	24	(Germany) Albert von Thurn und Taxis	1
Lamborghini	(Germany) Reiter Engineering	Gallardo FL2	25	(Czech Republic) Tomáš Enge	1, 7
McLaren	(United States) K-Pax Racing	12C GT3	6	(United States) Robert Thorne	1–3, 5, 7
McLaren	(United States) K-Pax Racing	12C GT3	9	(United States) Alex Figge	1–3, 5, 7
Mercedes-Benz	(United States) Black Swan Racing	SLS AMG GT3	54	(United States) Tim Pappas	1–3, 5, 7
Nissan	(United States) CRP Racing	GTR	2	(United States) Mike Skeen	1
Porsche	(United States) Taggart Autosport	911 GT3 R	7	(United States) Jim Taggart	1
Porsche	(United States) EFFORT Racing	911 GT3 R	31	(Germany) Tim Bergmeister	1–3, 5, 7
Porsche	(United States) EFFORT Racing	911 GT3 R	41	(United States) Michael Mills	1–3, 5, 7

=== TC ===
Constructor	Team	Car	No.	Driver	Rounds
Honda	(Canada) M&S Racing	Civic Si	63	(Canada) Tom Kwok	4
Honda	(Canada) M&S Racing	Civic Si	88	(Canada) Gary Kwok	4
Honda	(United States) Cawley Motorsports	Civic Si	68	(United States) Jon Miller	3–4, 7
Honda	(Canada) Compass360 Racing	Civic Si	71	(Canada) Michael DiMeo	3–4, 6–7
Honda	(Canada) Compass360 Racing	Civic Si	72	(Canada) Karl Thompson	3–4, 6–7
Hyundai	(United States) GenRacer	Genesis Coupe	77	(United States) Jeff Ricca	6
Mazda	(United States) Eastex Motorsports	MX-5	11	(United States) Adam Poland	3–4, 7
Mazda	(United States) Grid-1 Motorsports	MX-5	28	(United States) Jason Saini	3–4
Mazda	(United States) Hale Motorsports	MX-5	83	(United States) Randy Hale	6
Mazda	(United States) Hale Motorsports	MX-5	84	(United States) Stan Wilson	6
Mazda	(United States) Tech Sport Racing	RX-8	23	(United States) Kevin Anderson	6
Mazda	(United States) Tech Sport Racing	RX-8	23	(United States) Dan Martinson	7
Nissan	(United States) Skullcandy Team Nissan	Altima Coupe	93	(United States) Bryan Heitkotter	7
Nissan	(United States) Skullcandy Team Nissan	Altima Coupe	94	(United States) Steven Doherty	7
Volkswagen	(United States) RS Werks	GTI	03	(United States) Colin Cohen	3
Volkswagen	(United States) Emich Racing	Jetta GLI	19	(United States) Emilee Tominovich	6
Volkswagen	(United States) Emich Racing	Jetta GLI	30	(United States) Fred Emich	7

=== TCA ===
Constructor	Team	Car	No.	Driver	Rounds
Honda	(United States) NDP Motorsport	Civic Si	5	(Colombia) Daniel Fernández	3
Honda	(United States) NDP Motorsport	Civic Si	5	(United States) Neal de Paz	6
Honda	(United States) Shea Racing	Civic Si	67	(United States) Shea Holbrook	3–4, 6–7
Kia	(United States) Kinetic Motorsports	Forte Koup	36	(United States) Jason Wolfe	3–4, 6–7
Kia	(United States) Kinetic Motorsports	Forte Koup	38	(Bermuda) Russell Smith	3–4, 6
Mazda	(United States) Breathless Performance	MX-5	13	(United States) Jason Cherry	3–4, 6–7
Mazda	(United States) Breathless Performance	MX-5	98	(United States) Michael Camus	3
Mazda	(United States) Breathless Performance	MX-5	98	(United States) Ernie Francis, Jr.	4, 6–7
Mazda	(United States) Grid-1 Motorsports	RX-8	97	(United States) Justin Hayes	3
Mazda	(United States) Grid-1 Motorsports	RX-8	97	(United States) Robby Foley	4

== Race results ==
Rnd	Circuit	GT Winning Car	GTS Winning Car	TC Winning Car	TCB Winning Car
Rnd	Circuit	GT Winning Driver	GTS Winning Driver	TC Winning Driver	TCB Winning Driver
1	St. Petersburg	#25 Lamborghini Gallardo GT3	#1 Chevrolet Camaro	Did not participate	
1	St. Petersburg	(Czech Republic) Tomáš Enge	(United States) Lawson Aschenbach	Did not participate	
2	Long Beach	#3 Cadillac CTS-V	#36 Kia Optima	Did not participate	
2	Long Beach	(United States) Johnny O'Connell	(Sweden) Niclas Jönsson	Did not participate	
3	Barber	#61 Ferrari 458 GT3	#38 Kia Optima	#71 Honda Civic Si	#51 Honda Fit
3	Barber	(United States) Anthony Lazzaro	(Canada) Mark Wilkins	(Canada) Michael DiMeo	(United States) Brian Price
3	Barber	#21 Audi R8 LMS ultra	#73 Porsche Cayman S	Race cancelled	
3	Barber	(United States) Andrew Palmer	(United States) Jack Baldwin	Race cancelled	
4	Mosport	Did not participate		#71 Honda Civic Si	#51 Honda Fit
4	Mosport	Did not participate		(Canada) Michael DiMeo	(United States) Brian Price
4	Mosport	Did not participate		#71 Honda Civic Si	#51 Honda Fit
4	Mosport	Did not participate		(Canada) Michael DiMeo	(United States) Brian Price
4	Mosport	Did not participate		#71 Honda Civic Si	#14 Ford Fiesta
4	Mosport	Did not participate		(Canada) Michael DiMeo	(United States) Nathan Stacy
5	Detroit	#3 Cadillac CTS-V	#50 Ford Mustang Boss 302S	Did not participate	
5	Detroit	(United States) Johnny O'Connell	(United States) Dean Martin	Did not participate	
5	Detroit	#3 Cadillac CTS-V	#50 Ford Mustang Boss 302S	Did not participate	
5	Detroit	(United States) Johnny O'Connell	(United States) Dean Martin	Did not participate	
6	New Jersey	Did not participate		#71 Honda Civic Si	#51 Honda Fit
6	New Jersey	Did not participate		(Canada) Michael DiMeo	(United States) Brian Price
6	New Jersey	Did not participate		#71 Honda Civic Si	#37 Mini Cooper
6	New Jersey	Did not participate		(Canada) Michael DiMeo	(United States) Tyler Palmer
7	Road America	#2 Audi R8 LMS ultra	#36 Kia Optima	#94 Nissan Altima Coupe	#65 Honda Fit
7	Road America	(United States) Mike Skeen	(Sweden) Niclas Jönsson	(United States) Steven Doherty	(United States) Paul Holton
7	Road America	#2 Audi R8 LMS ultra	#36 Kia Optima	#11 Mazda MX-5	#58 Mini Cooper
7	Road America	(United States) Mike Skeen	(Sweden) Niclas Jönsson	(United States) Adam Poland	(Canada) Glenn Nixon
8	Toronto	#31 Porsche 911 GT3 R	#50 Ford Mustang Boss 302S	Did not participate	
8	Toronto	(United Kingdom) Nick Tandy	(United States) Dean Martin	Did not participate	
8	Toronto	#92 Dodge Viper SRT GT3-R	#38 Kia Optima	Did not participate	
8	Toronto	(Canada) Kuno Wittmer	(Canada) Mark Wilkins	Did not participate	
9	Mid-Ohio	#31 Porsche 911 GT3 R	#1 Chevrolet Camaro	#71 Honda Civic Si	#37 Mini Cooper
9	Mid-Ohio	(United Kingdom) Ryan Dalziel	(United States) Lawson Aschenbach	(Canada) Michael DiMeo	(United States) Tyler Palmer
9	Mid-Ohio	#31 Porsche 911 GT3 R	#1 Chevrolet Camaro	#71 Honda Civic Si	#12 Honda Fit
9	Mid-Ohio	(United Kingdom) Ryan Dalziel	(United States) Lawson Aschenbach	(Canada) Michael DiMeo	(Canada) Chase Pelletier
10	Sonoma	#2 Audi R8 LMS ultra	#73 Porsche Cayman S	Did not participate	
10	Sonoma	(United States) Mike Skeen	(United States) Jack Baldwin	Did not participate	
10	Sonoma	#61 Ferrari 458 GT3	#1 Chevrolet Camaro	Did not participate	
10	Sonoma	(United States) Anthony Lazzaro	(United States) Lawson Aschenbach	Did not participate	
11	Brainerd	Did not participate		#72 Honda Civic Si	#12 Honda Fit
11	Brainerd	Did not participate		(Canada) Karl Thomson	(Denmark) Johan Schwartz
11	Brainerd	Did not participate		#30 Volkswagen Jetta GLI	#12 Honda Fit
11	Brainerd	Did not participate		(United States) Fred Emich	(Denmark) Johan Schwartz
12	Utah	#88 Bentley Continental GT3	#34 Aston Martin Vantage GT4	#11 Mazda MX-5	#51 Honda Fit
12	Utah	(United Kingdom) Guy Smith	(United States) Nick Esayian	(United States) Adam Poland	(United States) Brian Price
12	Utah	#6 McLaren MP4-12C GT3	#73 Porsche Cayman S	#94 Nissan Altima Coupe	#12 Honda Fit
12	Utah	(United States) Robert Thorne	(United States) Jack Baldwin	(United States) Steven Doherty	(Denmark) Johan Schwartz

== Championship standings ==
=== Drivers' Championships ===
Championship points were awarded to drivers based on qualifying and finishing positions. The driver had to complete at least 70% of the winner's number of laps to receive points. The Pole position winner received 7 points. In addition, 1 bonus point was awarded to a driver leading a lap during a race, and 3 bonus points were awarded to the driver leading the most laps. The driver who set the fastest lap of the race received 1 bonus point.

Position	1	2	3	4	5	6	7	8	9	10	11	12	13	14	15	16	17	18	19	20	21	22	23	24	25	26	27	28	29	30	31	32	33	34	35	36	37	38	39	40
Race	140	110	95	85	80	76	72	68	64	60	57	54	51	48	45	43	41	39	37	35	33	31	29	27	25	23	21	19	17	15	13	11	9	7	6	5	4	3	2	1

==== GT ====
Pos	Driver	Car	STP	LBH	BAR		DET		ELK		TOR		MOH		SON		UTA		Points
1	(United States) Johnny O'Connell	Cadillac CTS-V	19	1	2	3	1	1	7	3	3	8	2	5	5	8	2	7	1558
2	(United States) Mike Skeen	Audi R8 LMS ultra	11	6	6	5	4	4	1	1	4	3	3	2	1	19	23†	8	1402
3	(United States) Anthony Lazzaro	Ferrari 458 GT3	4	3	1	2	3	5	12	18†	5	2	4	3	21	1	5	6	1372
4	(United Kingdom) Andy Pilgrim	Cadillac CTS-V	2	2	5	7	17	2	4	2	6	5	7	6	8	10	4	3	1338
5	(United States) Andrew Palmer	Audi R8 LMS ultra	3	4	16	1	2	3	5	6	9	6	5	4	4	22†	7	10	1256
6	(United States) James Sofronas	Audi R8 LMS ultra	7	5	4	6	8	6	8	10	7	7	6	7	7	6	20†	11	1062
7	(United States) Robert Thorne	McLaren MP4-12C GT3	23†	20†	12	11	6	8	2	8	15	4	17	21	10	3	6	1	1017
8	(United States) Michael Mills	Porsche 911 GT3 R	12	10	11	12	16	11	18†	17†	11	10	8	10	11	12	9	14	793
9	(Sweden) Henrik Hedman	Ferrari 458 GT3	16	11	9	17	13	13	15†	12	12	12	20	18	18	13	13	18	723
10	(United States) Dan Knox	Dodge Viper SRT GT3-R	15	14	15	15	10	12	17†	14	17	11	15	14	15	15	17	16	710
11	(United States) Butch Leitzinger	Bentley Continental GT3							6	4	19	9	12	8	3	5	3	4	702
12	(United States) Nick Mancuso	Ferrari 458 GT3	5	17	3	4	7	7	11	7	8	16							693
13	(United States) Alex Figge	McLaren MP4-12C GT3	8	7	10	8	5	18	9	19†			18	9	19	18	8	23†	679
14	(Brazil) Marcelo Hahn	Lamborghini Gallardo GT3	21†		17	10	18	10	19†	11	10	13	24†	15	13	9	11	13	638
15	(United Kingdom) Ryan Dalziel	Porsche 911 GT3 R											1	1	2	2	21†	2	584
16	(United States) Jeff Courtney	Audi R8 LMS ultra	13	12	14	14			14	13			19	16	12	14	15	17	568
17	(Germany) Tim Bergmeister	Porsche 911 GT3 R	10	8	7	9	9	9	3	5									567
18	(United States) Tim Pappas	Mercedes-Benz SLS AMG GT3	20	13	8	13	12	14	10	16	20†	DNS	21	13			22†	12	548
19	(United States) Bill Ziegler	Audi R8 LMS ultra	17	19†	18	16	15	17	13	15	14	14	14	20	17	21†			525
20	(United Kingdom) Guy Smith	Bentley Continental GT3													9	16	1	5	352
21	(Germany) Albert von Thurn und Taxis	Lamborghini Gallardo GT3	6								18	DNS	10	11	20	7			300
22	(United States) Mike Hedlund	Ferrari 458 GT3	9	9	19†	DNS									6	4			289
23	(United States) Brent Holden	Audi R8 LMS ultra		16			14	16			21†	19†			14	20†	16	20	260
24	(United States) Bret Curtis	Audi R8 LMS ultra	14	15	13	DNS	11	15			13	17†							257
25	(Canada) Kuno Wittmer	Dodge Viper SRT GT3-R									2	1							234
26	(Czech Republic) Tomáš Enge	Lamborghini Gallardo GT3	1						16†	9									213
27	(United Kingdom) Alex Lloyd	Chevrolet Corvette Z06											11	22	DNS	17	14	22	208
28	(United Kingdom) Nick Tandy	Porsche 911 GT3 R									1	15							196
29	(United States) Alex Welch	Audi R8 LMS ultra											16	17			12	15	183
30	(United States) Walt Bowlin	Audi R8 LMS ultra									16	18†	23	23†			19	21	142
31	(United States) Andy Lee	Lamborghini Gallardo GT3															10	9	104
32	(Denmark) Christina Nielsen	Aston Martin Vantage GT3													16	11			100
33	(United States) Jim Taggart	Porsche 911 GT3 R	22†										9	12					98
34	(Canada) Louis-Philippe Montour	Dodge Viper Comp. Coupe															18	19	76
35	(United States) Peter Cunningham	Acura TLX-GT											13	19	22†	DNS			68
36	(United States) Dane Cameron	BMW Z4 GT3	18																39
37	(Canada) Fred Roberts	Dodge Viper Comp. Coupe									22†	DNS	22	24†					31
38	(United States) Tomy Drissi	Aston Martin Vantage GT3		18															19
Pos	Driver	Car	STP	LBH	BAR		DET		ELK		TOR		MOH		SON		UTA		Points

Color	Result
Gold	Winner
Silver	2nd place
Bronze	3rd place
Green	4th & 5th place
Light Blue	6th–10th place
Dark Blue	Finished (Outside Top 10)
Purple	Did not finish
Red	Did not qualify (DNQ)
Brown	Withdrawn (Wth)
Black	Disqualified (DSQ)
White	Did not start (DNS)
Blank	Did not participate

Blue – GT-A

Notes

- Results denoted by † did not complete sufficient laps in order to score points.

==== GTS ====
Pos	Driver	Car	STP	LBH	BAR		DET		ELK		TOR		MOH		SON		UTA		Points
1	(United States) Lawson Aschenbach	Chevrolet Camaro	1	18†	6	3	19	20	5	6	2	5	1	1	2	1	4	2	1448
2	(United States) Jack Baldwin	Porsche Cayman S	3	19†	3	1	2	4	4	23†	12	4	17	18	1	2	2	1	1398
3	(Canada) Mark Wilkins	Kia Optima	10	3	1	5	4	3	2	7	4	1	4	3	4	4	17†	17†	1340
4	(United States) Dean Martin	Ford Mustang Boss 302S	20		10	25†	1	1	6	4	1	6	11	4	20†	16	18†	5	1106
5	(United States) Jack Roush, Jr.	Ford Mustang Boss 302R	5	4	2	21†	6	19	15	2	3	3	12	8	8	20†	5	7	1083
6	(United States) Tony Gaples	Chevrolet Camaro	9	8	9	6	12	11	9	13	7	9	6	7	7	7	10	10	1046
7	(Sweden) Niclas Jönsson	Kia Optima	6	1	22	2	3	22†	1	1	15†	12	3	2	19†	17†	16†	16†	1022
8	(United States) Nick Esayian	Aston Martin Vantage GT4	14	10	8	7	9	12	8	14	14†	11	7	10	10	8	1	6	1016
9	(United States) Alec Udell	Ford Mustang Boss 302S	22†	5	5	23†	5	7	23†	5	5	2	2	9	5	6	6	18†	988
10	(United States) Andy Lee	Chevrolet Camaro	2	7	18	4	7	21†	3	8	17†	13	9	6	6	3			909
11	(United States) Buz McCall	Porsche Cayman S	13	11	17	14	13	14	12	19	9	16	10	16	16	13	14	11	798
12	(United States) Mitch Landry	Ford Mustang Boss 302S	21†	15	14	12	16	10	22†	10	6	7	21†	11	9	18†	9	9	707
13	(Mexico) Jorge De La Torre	Aston Martin Vantage GT4	18	12	16	13	22	15	14	20	11	15	19	19†	17	14	12	13	679
14	(United States) Brad Adams	Ford Mustang Boss 302S	17	9	21	9	23	9	19	9	18†	14	13	13	18†	12	11	15	673
15	(United States) Drew Regitz	Aston Martin Vantage GT4	16	6	25†	17	15	8	20	22†	16†	8	18	DNS	12	19†	3	3	639
16	(United States) Ric Bushey	Nissan 370Z	7	16	11	18	10	5	7	12	8	10	23†	17	DNS	22†			609
17	(United States) Tony Buffomante	Ford Mustang Boss 302S	4	2	4	24†	20	2	16	3									543
18	(United States) Mark Klenin	Aston Martin Vantage GT4	11		15	10	21	16	10	11			DNS	12			7	8	529
19	(United States) Geoff Reeves	Chevrolet Camaro	23†	17	24	15	18	23†			13†	18	16	15	15	21†	13	12	405
20	(United States) Joey Atterbury	Ford Mustang Boss 302S											5	5	3	5			335
21	(United States) Erik Davis	Ford Mustang Boss 302S	24†	13			11	13	24†	16					11	9			323
22	(United States) Chris Outzen	Ford Mustang Boss 302S	15		20	20†	17	17	18	24†	10	19							298
23	(Belgium) David Sterckx	Ford Mustang Boss 302S	8	20†			8	6	21†	15									257
24	(United States) Brian Kleeman	Nissan 370Z			26†	DNS	DNS	DNS	11	21			14	20†	14	10			246
25	(United States) Craig Capaldi	Ford Mustang Boss 302S			13	11	24	DNS	17	17			22†	DNS					190
26	(United States) Larry Funk	BMW M3							13	18			8	21†					158
27	(United States) Michael Cooper	Chevrolet Camaro															8	4	153
28	(United States) Ryan Eversley	Subaru Impreza WRX STI			12	8													122
29	(United States) Derek DeBoer	Aston Martin Vantage GT4													13	11			108
30	(United States) Don Istook	Audi TT RS	12	14															102
31	(Bulgaria) Vesko Kozarov	Nissan 370Z															15	14	93
32	(United States) Todd Napieralski	Chevrolet Camaro					14	18											87
33	(United States) Clint Guthrie	Porsche 911 Carrera			19	16													80
34	(South Africa) Mikey Taylor	Aston Martin Vantage GT4			7	22†													72
35	(Panama) Fernando Seferlis	Chevrolet Camaro	19		23	19													66
36	(Mexico) Santiago Creel	Aston Martin Vantage GT4													21†	15			45
37	(United States) Jay Matus	Porsche 911 GT3											15	22†					45
38	(United States) Ray Mason	Subaru Impreza WRX STI									19†	17							41
39	(United States) Robert Stout	Scion FR-S	26†										24†	23†					0
40	(United States) Ernie Francis, Jr.	Chevrolet Camaro	25†																0
Drivers ineligible for championship points
	(United States) Austin Cindric	Ford Mustang FR500S												14					
	(United States) Scott Bove	Ford Mustang FR500S											20						
Pos	Driver	Car	STP	LBH	BAR		DET		ELK		TOR		MOH		SON		UTA		Points

Notes

- Results denoted by † did not complete sufficient laps in order to score points.

==== TC ====
Pos	Driver	Car	BAR	MOS			NJ		ELK		MOH		BIR		UTA		Points
1	(Canada) Michael DiMeo	Honda Civic Si	1	1	1	1	1	1	2	2	1	1			7	4	1573
2	(Canada) Karl Thomson	Honda Civic Si	6	4	4	3	3	3	7	5			1	2	5	8	1075
3	(United States) Adam Poland	Mazda MX-5	3	6	5	5			3	1	5	3			1	5	993
4	(United States) Steven Doherty	Nissan Altima Coupe							1	7†	2	2			2	1	627
5	(United States) Fred Emich	Volkswagen Jetta GLI							4	6†			3	1	6	3	496
6	(United States) Emilee Tominovich	Volkswagen Jetta GLI					4	6			8	5			DNS	6	385
7	(United States) Bryan Heitkotter	Nissan Altima Coupe							6	3	3	9†			4	9†	359
8	(Canada) Gary Kwok	Honda Civic Si		2	2	2											340
9	(United States) Kevin Anderson	Mazda RX-8					2	2			9†	4					285
10	(Canada) Tom Kwok	Honda Civic Si		3	3	4											275
11	(United States) Jon Miller	Honda Civic Si	5	7†	DNS	DNS			5	4							250
12	(United States) Ray Mason	Honda Civic Si											2	3			213
13	(United States) Jason Saini	Mazda MX-5	2	5	DNS	6†											191
14	(United States) Michael Pettiford	Pontiac Solstice											4	4	3	2	170
15	(United States) Tony Rivera	Scion FR-S									4	7					157
16	(United States) Randy Hale	Mazda MX-5					6	5									156
17	(United States) Branden Peterson	Honda Civic Si									7	6					148
18	(United States) Ron Yarab	Honda Civic Si									6	8					144
19	(United States) Jeff Ricca	Hyundai Genesis Coupe					7†	4									85
20	(United States) Colin Cohen	Volkswagen GTI	4														85
21	(United States) Stan Wilson	Mazda MX-5					5	DNS									80
22	(United States) Steve Burns	Pontiac Solstice														7	72
23	(United States) Lisa Noble	Pontiac Solstice													8		68
	(United States) Neal DePaz	Honda Civic Si					DNS	DNS									0
	(United States) Dan Martinson	Mazda RX-8							DNS	DNS							0
Pos	Driver	Car	BAR	MOS			NJ		ELK		MOH		BIR		UTA		Points

Notes

- Results denoted by † did not complete sufficient laps in order to score points.

==== TCA ====
Pos	Driver	Car	BAR	MOS			NJ		ELK		MOH		BIR		UTA		Points
1	(United States) Jason Wolfe	Kia Forte Koup	3	1	1	2	4	4	4	1	1	4	3	2	2	1	1597
2	(United States) Shea Holbrook	Honda Civic Si	1	2	3	3	1	1	1	2	4	1	2	4	5		1390
3	(United States) Ernie Francis, Jr.	Mazda MX-5		3	2	1	2	3	2	4	2	2	1	1	3	5†	1366
4	(United States) Jason Cherry	Mazda MX-5	2	4	4	6	3	2	3	3	3	3	4	3	4	3	1319
5	(Bermuda) Russell Smith	Kia Forte Koup	4	5	5	5	5	DNS									405
6	(Sweden) Niclas Jönsson	Kia Forte Koup													1	2	274
7	(United States) Robby Foley	Mazda RX-8		6	6†	4											161
8	(United States) Mike Skeen	Honda Civic Si														4	85
9	(Colombia) Daniel Fernández	Honda Civic Si	5														80
10	(United States) Justin Hayes	Mazda RX-8	6†														0
	(United States) Michael Camus	Mazda MX-5	DNS														0
Pos	Driver	Car	BAR	MOS			NJ		ELK		MOH		BIR		UTA		Points

Notes

- Results denoted by † did not complete sufficient laps in order to score points.

==== TCB ====
Pos	Driver	Car	BAR	MOS			NJ		ELK		MOH		BIR		UTA		Points
1	(United States) Brian Price	Honda Fit	1	1	1	2	1	2	DNS	DNS	9	2	8	5	1	3	1390
2	(United States) Nathan Stacy	Ford Fiesta	4	4	3	1	3	3	7	6	10	3	3	6	2	5	1265
3	(United States) Tyler Palmer	Mini Cooper	2	2			2	1	3	4	1	4	5	3	4	4	1207
4	(United States) Paul Holton	Honda Fit	7	6	7	5	4	7	1	3	12	7	4	4	9	10†	1053
5	(United States) Jason Fichter	Mini Cooper	12	5	2	8	7	8	10	10	7	10	7	9	6	7	974
6	(Canada) P. J. Groenke	Honda Fit	6	9	8†	3	5	6	6	13	4	9	6	8	7	8	968
7	(Canada) Andrei Kisel	Mini Cooper	10	10†	DNS	DNS	8	4	9	9	13	8	12	7	3	2	801
8	(Denmark) Johan Schwartz	Honda Fit	3						5				1	1	5	1	679
9	(Canada) Glenn Nixon	Mini Cooper							2	1	3	6	2	2	12†	6	642
10	(United States) Tom Noble	Mini Cooper	13				11	12	11	14†	8	11	13	12	10†	11†	452
11	(United States) Austin Snader	Fiat 500	5				9	10	8	7	6	13†					420
12	(Australia) Jim Cleveland	Mini Cooper	15†	8	5	7	10	9	14†	11							405
13	(United States) Chris Capaldi	Ford Fiesta	8	11†	DNS	6			13	8							266
14	(Canada) Chase Pelletier	Honda Fit									5	1					233
15	(United States) John Heinricy	Chevrolet Sonic									2	5					199
16	(United States) Nick Lougee	Mini Cooper			4	4											178
17	(United States) Michael Ashby	Mazda 2							4	5							165
18	(United States) Dave Rosenblum	Ford Fiesta					6	5									156
19	(United States) George Calfo	Mini Cooper		7	6	DNS											152
20	(United States) John McCarthy	Mazda 2											9	10			124
21	(United States) Chris Holter	Mazda 2											10	11			117
22	(United States) Ryan Reed	Honda Fit								2							111
23	(United States) Marc Boily	Mazda 2					12	11									111
24	(Canada) Nic Duynstee	Honda Fit													8	12†	68
25	(United States) Chris Sneed	Mini Cooper	9														64
26	(Canada) Damon Surzyshyn	Honda Fit	11														57
Drivers ineligible for championship points
	(Canada) Nick Wittmer	Fiat 500		3	DNS	9											
	(United States) Leo Parente	Fiat 500									11				11	9	
	(Canada) Brian Makes	Fiat 500											11	13			
	(United States) Mike Lewis	Fiat 500								12							
	(United States) Kevin Fandozzi	Fiat 500							12								
	(United States) Dan Goodman	Fiat 500										12					
	(United States) Nick Esayian	Fiat 500	14														
Pos	Driver	Car	BAR	MOS			NJ		ELK		MOH		BIR		UTA		Points

Notes

- Results denoted by † did not complete sufficient laps in order to score points.

=== Manufacturers' Championships ===
Manufacturer points were awarded according to the highest-finishing car from that manufacturer. Only manufacturers that were SCCA Pro Racing corporate members received points. Points were awarded on the following basis:

Position	1	2	3	4	5	6
Points	9	7	5	3	2	1

In addition, one bonus point was awarded to the pole-winning manufacturer. In the table below, the manufacturer's top finishing position is shown, with pole winner in bold.

==== GT ====
Pos	Manufacturer	STP	LBH	BAR		DET		ELK		TOR		MOH		SON		UTA		Points
1	(United States) Cadillac	2	**1**	2	3	**1**	**1**	**4**	2	3	5	2	5	5	8	2	3	90
2	(Germany) Audi	3	4	4	**1**	2	3	1	**1**	4	**3**	**3**	2	**1**	6	7	8	85
3	(Italy) Ferrari	4	3	**1**	2	3	5	11	7	5	2	4	3	6	1	5	6	62
4	(Germany) Porsche	10	8	7	9	9	9	3	5	**1**	10	1	**1**	2	2	9	2	57
5	(United Kingdom) McLaren	8	7	10	8	5	8	2	8	15	4	17	9	10	3	6	1	27
6	(United Kingdom) Bentley							6	4	19	9	12	8	3	**5**	**1**	**4**	26
7	(United States) Dodge	15	14	15	15	10	12	17	14	2	1	15	14	15	15	17	16	16
8	(Italy) Lamborghini	**1**		17	10	18	10	16	9	10	13	10	11	13	7	10	9	10
9	(Germany) Mercedes-AMG	20	13	8	13	12	14	10	16	20	DNS	21	13			22	12	0
10	(United Kingdom) Aston Martin		18											16	11			0
11	(Japan) Nissan	11																0
12	(Japan) Acura											13	19	22	DNS			0
Pos	Manufacturer	STP	LBH	BAR		DET		ELK		TOR		MOH		SON		UTA		Points

Color	Result
Gold	Winner
Silver	2nd place
Bronze	3rd place
Green	4th–6th place
Dark Blue	Finished (Outside Points)
Purple	Did not finish
Blank	Did not participate

==== GTS ====
Pos	Manufacturer	STP	LBH	BAR		DET		ELK		TOR		MOH		SON		UTA		Points
1	(South Korea) Kia	6	1	1	2	3	3	1	**1**	**4**	**1**	3	2	4	4	**16**	**16**	89
2	(United States) Ford	4	**2**	2	9	**1**	**1**	6	2	1	2	2	4	3	5	5	5	83
3	(United States) Chevrolet	1	7	6	3	7	11	3	6	2	5	**1**	**1**	2	1	4	2	76
4	(Germany) Porsche	**3**	11	**3**	**1**	2	4	**4**	19	9	4	10	16	**1**	**2**	2	1	73
5	(United Kingdom) Aston Martin	11	6	7	7	9	8	8	11	11	8	7	10	10	8	1	3	15
6	(Japan) Nissan	7	16	11	18	10	5	7	12	8	10	14	17	14	10	15	14	2
Pos	Manufacturer	STP	LBH	BAR		DET		ELK		TOR		MOH		SON		UTA		Points

==== TC ====
Pos	Manufacturer	BAR	MOS			NJ		ELK		MOH		BIR		UTA		Points
1	(Japan) Honda	**1**	**1**	**1**	**1**	**1**	**1**	2	2	**1**	1	**1**	**2**	5	4	116
2	(Japan) Nissan							**1**	3	2	**2**			2	1	46
Manufacturers ineligible for championship points
	(Japan) Mazda	2	5	5	5	5	5	3	1	5	3			1	5	0
	(Germany) Volkswagen	4				4	6	4	6	8	5	3	1	6	3	0
	(United States) Pontiac											4	4	3	2	0
	(South Korea) Hyundai					7	4									0
	(United States) Scion									4	7					0
Pos	Manufacturer	BAR	MOS			NJ		ELK		MOH		BIR		UTA		Points

==== TCA ====
Pos	Manufacturer	BAR	MOS			NJ		ELK		MOH		BIR		UTA		Points
1	(South Korea) Kia	3	**1**	1	2	4	4	**4**	1	1	4	3	2	**1**	**1**	94
2	(Japan) Honda	**1**	2	**3**	3	**1**	1	1	**2**	**4**	**1**	**2**	4	5	4	94
Manufacturers ineligible for championship points
	(Japan) Mazda	2	3	2	1	3	2	2	3	2	2	1	1	3	3	0
Pos	Manufacturer	BAR	MOS			NJ		ELK		MOH		BIR		UTA		Points

==== TCB ====
Pos	Manufacturer	BAR	MOS			NJ		ELK		MOH		BIR		UTA		Points
1	(Japan) Honda	**1**	**1**	1	2	**1**	**2**	1	**2**	4	**1**	**1**	**1**	**1**	1	123
2	(United Kingdom) Mini	2	2	**2**	3	2	1	**2**	1	1	4	2	2	3	2	98
3	(United States) Chevrolet									**2**	5					10
4	(Japan) Mazda					12	11	4	5			9	10			5
5	(Italy) Fiat	5	3	9	9	9	10	8	7	6	12	11	13	11	9	3
Manufacturers ineligible for championship points
	(United States) Ford	4	4	3	1	3	3	7	6	10	3	3	6	2	5	0
Pos	Manufacturer	BAR	MOS			NJ		ELK		MOH		BIR		UTA		Points
