= Sean Rayhall =

American racing driver (born 1995)

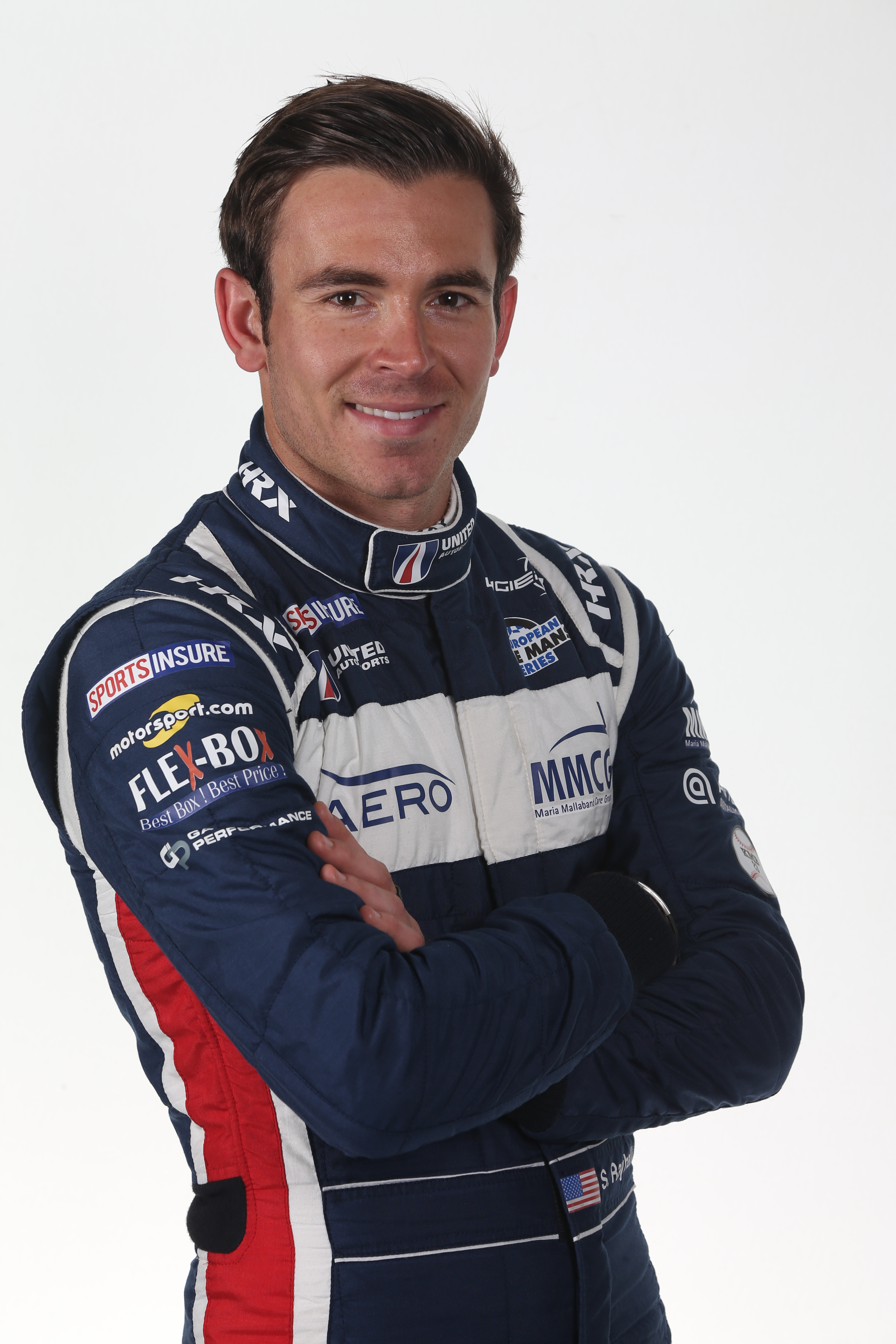
- United Autosports 2017 - Sean Rayhall
- Nationality: (United States) American
- Born: March 10, 1995 (age 31) Winston, Georgia

FAST on Dirt career
- Current team: Sean Rayhall Motorsports
- Categorisation: FIA Gold (until 2016, 2019–); FIA Silver (2017–2018)
- Car number: 14
- Crew chief: Darl Lyons

Previous series
- WeatherTech SportsCar Championship; European Le Mans Series; American Le Mans Series; IMSA Lites L1; UARA Stars; CARS X-1R Pro Cup Series; SCCA Pro Formula Enterprises; Skip Barber National Championship; Karting

Championship titles
- 2017 2013 2010: ELMS LMP3; IMSA Lites L1; SCCA Pro Formula Enterprises

Sean Rayhall (born March 10, 1995) is an American racing driver. He competed in the LMP3 class of the European Le Mans Series, winning the championship in 2017. He has also previously raced in the GT Daytona class of the WeatherTech SportsCar Championship, in addition to stock cars and formula cars, where in the latter, he earned a test opportunity with Chip Ganassi Racing.

Rayhall announced his retirement from professional racing at the age of 23 in a post on Twitter. Three months later, he announced that he would compete in "fifteen-twenty races" in a winged sprint car with Michael Racing Group as a hobby.

== Early life ==
Rayhall was born in 1995 in Winston, Georgia.

== Career history ==
=== Karting ===
Rayhall started kart racing at the age of seven. He joined the Georgia Sprint Kart Championship in the Yamaha Junior class in 2004. In the following seasons, he would also compete in the Florida State championship and in the WKA Manufacturer's Cup. Rayhall won two championships in the 2007 Georgia Sprint Kart Championship, in the HPV 2 and Rotax Junior classes.

=== Auto racing ===
Rayhall made his auto racing debut in late 2007 in the Skip Barber Southern Series. He won his first auto race in 2009. At Road Atlanta, he finished first in his Reynard R/T 2000. In 2010, Rayhall raced in the Formula Enterprises and he made his debut in Legends car racing. In the SCCA Pro Formula Enterprises, Rayhall had a tough battle for the championship with Scott Rettich. Rayhall won six races. He was the fastest at New Jersey Motorsports Park, Miller Motorsports Park, Brainerd International Raceway and Virginia International Raceway. He eventually won the championship by 23 points. In Legends, Rayhall had a very successful season at the small ovals of Atlanta Motor Speedway and Charlotte Motor Speedway. Rayhall won both track championships. Rayhall also won the prestigious Legends Million race in the Semi Pro/Young Lions class. In 2011, Rayhall made his stock car racing debut in the USAR Pro Cup Series. A third place at New Smyrna Speedway was his best result out of eight races. The following year, he continued in stock cars. This time, he raced full-time in the southern based UARA Stars. His season was almost disrupted by a big pile up during a legends race. Rayhall injured his back racing in the Big Money 100. A week later, he took his only stock car win of the season at Caraway Speedway after he switched marques from Chevrolet to Ford. Rayhall ended up fourth in the standings of the 16-round championship while Travis Swaim won the championship.

In 2013, Rayhell switched to sports cars. Racing for Comprent Motorsports, he won six races and scored twelve podium finishes out of fourteen races. Ryan Booth followed closely every race bringing the title chase to the last round. Rayhall eventually won the championship by four points. Rayhall graduated to the PC class of the American Le Mans Series for the 2013 Petit Le Mans. Partnered with Oswaldo Negri the duo finished second in class. For 2014, Rayhall raced full-time in the United SportsCar Championship PC class for BAR1 Motorsport and 8 Star Motorsports. He finished sixth in the PC class championship. He will make his Indy Lights debut with 8 Star at Barber Motorsports Park in 2015. He won the second of two Indy Lights races in the Indy GP, leading all 35 laps. He scored his second win in the second race at the Mid-Ohio Sports Car Course.

On December 16, 2018, Rayhall announced his retirement from motor racing, via his Twitter social media account, effective immediately. In 2020, he raced in a 410 sprint car in the Upper Midwestern racing series Interstate Racing Association (IRA). He won his second semi-feature race by September. He was named the 2020 IRA Rookie of the Year.

== Motorsports results ==
=== American Open-Wheel racing results ===
(key) (Races in bold indicate pole position, races in italics indicate fastest race lap)

==== Complete SCCA Pro Formula Enterprises results ====
Year	Entrant	1	2	3	4	5	6	7	8	9	10	Pos	Points
2010	Comprent Motorsports	**ATL**; 4	**ATL**; Ret	**NJMP**; 1	**NJMP**; 1	**MIL**; 1	**MIL**; 1	**BIR**; 2	**BIR**; 1	VIR; Ret	VIR; 1	1st	1203

==== Indy Lights ====
Year	Team	1	2	3	4	5	6	7	8	9	10	11	12	13	14	15	16	17	18	Rank	Points
2015	8 Star Motorsports	STP	STP	LBH	ALA; 12	ALA; 6	IMS; 2	IMS; 1	INDY; 6	TOR	TOR	MIL	IOW	MOH; 5	MOH; 1	LAG; 4	LAG; 2			12th	188
2016	Team Pelfrey	STP	STP	PHX	ALA	ALA	IMS	IMS	INDY	RDA	RDA	IOW	TOR	TOR	MOH	MOH	WGL	LAG; 4	LAG; 8	19th	32

=== Complete WeatherTech SportsCar Championship results ===
(key) (Races in bold indicate pole position) (Races in italics indicate fastest lap)

Year	Entrant	Class	Make	Engine	1	2	3	4	5	6	7	8	9	10	Rank	Points
2016	Panoz DeltaWing Racing	P	DeltaWing DWC13	Élan (Mazda) 1.9 L I4 Turbo	DAY; 12	SEB; 9	LBH	LGA; 5	DET	WGL; 7	MOS; 7	ELK; 7	COA; 5	PET; 8	11th	196

=== Complete European Le Mans Series results ===
Year	Entrant	Class	Chassis	Engine	1	2	3	4	5	6	Rank	Points
2017	United Autosports	LMP3	Ligier JS P3	Nissan VK50VE 5.0 L V8	SIL; 1	MNZ; 9	RBR; 2	LEC; 1	SPA; 3	ALG; 2	1	103
2018	United Autosports	LMP3	Ligier JS P3	Nissan VK50VE 5.0 L V8	LEC; 5	MNZ; 5	RBR; Ret	SIL; 7	SPA (Note: The 4 Hours of Spa was red-flagged after 40 laps. As less than 75% of the race had passed at the time of suspension, half points were awarded to all classified finishers.); Not; Entered	ALG; Not; Entered	12	26

^{*} Season still in progress.

=== Complete 12 Hours of Sebring results ===
Year	Result	Team	Car	Class
2014	37th	8 Star Motorsports	Oreca FLM09	PC
2016	RET	Panoz DeltaWing Racing	DeltaWing DWC13	P
2017	2nd	Starworks Motorsport	Oreca FLM09	PC
