= Scott Rettich =

American racing driver

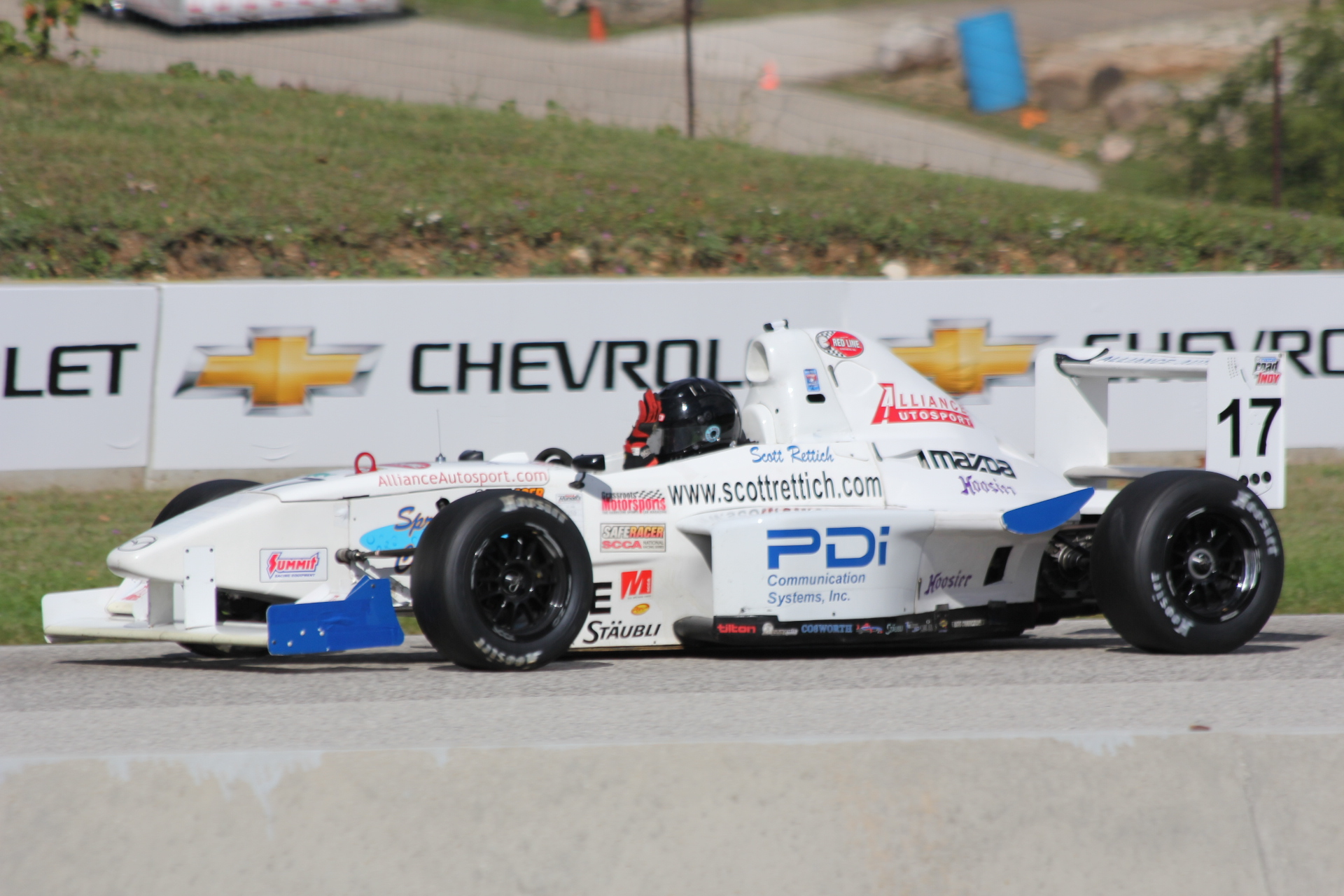
- Rettich celebrates his 2013 SCCA National Championship Runoffs victory at Road America
- Nationality: American
- Born: September 7, 1984 Dayton, Ohio, U.S.
- Died: April 12, 2022 (aged 37) Columbus, Ohio, U.S.

U.S. F2000 National Championship National class career
- Debut season: 2012
- Starts: 10
- Championships: 0
- Wins: 4
- Poles: 3
- Fastest laps: 4

Previous series
- 1996-2005 2006 2007-2008 2009-2022: Karting; Formula Mazda; Spec Racer Ford; Star Mazda; Formula Enterprises; Spec Racer Ford

Championship titles
- 2010-2011 2011, 2013: SCCA Spec Racer Ford Pro Series; SCCA Pro Formula Enterprises

Awards
- 2003 2004 2008: Great Lakes Driver of the Year; WKA Family of the Year; Star Mazda VP Fuels Most Improved Driver

Scott Rettich (September 7, 1984 – April 12, 2022) was an American racing driver, and competed in such disciplines as the U.S. F2000 National Championship in the National class.

== Career history ==
=== Karting ===
Rettich was born in Dayton, Ohio, and started karting in 1996. Between 1998 and 2004, Rettich entered the Ohio Valley Karting Club championship collecting 5 titles in various classes. Throughout his karting career, he entered the WKA Manufacturer's Cup and Gold Cup. Rettich won five championships, four in the Gold Cup and one in the Manufacturer's Cup. Between 2000 and 2005, Rettich was factory driver for Italian kart manufacturer Energy. And from 2003 until 2005 he also drove for Margay.

=== Auto racing ===
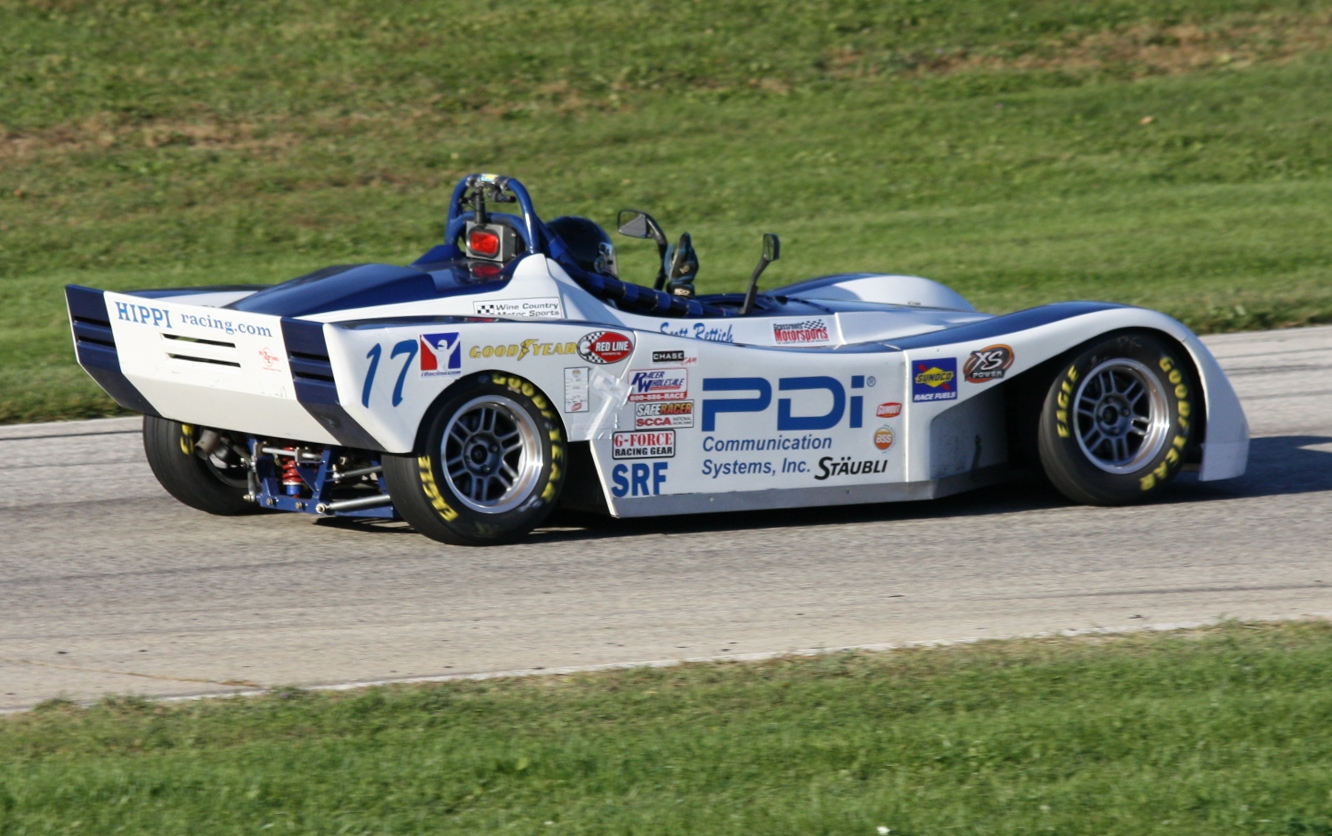
Rettich in his Spec Racer Ford at the 2010 SCCA National Championship Runoffs at Road America.

The first taste of motorsport for Rettich was the 2005 SCCA June Sprints. He entered in the Spec Racer Ford class but did not finish the race. For 2006, he raced in the SCCA Central Division in the Formula Mazda and Spec Racer Ford class for Keirn Motorsports. He won the championship in the Formula Mazda class winning five out of ten races. He also won the Formula Mazda June Sprints and the Runoffs, thus winning the SCCA Triple Crown. He scored a second place in the Spec Racer Ford championship.

Rettich made his pro racing debut in 2007 with Mundill Racing in the Star Mazda championship. He started nine out of 12 races in the season. He scored three top-ten finishes and scoring a 16th place in the championship. He was the best scoring driver for Mundill Racing, but also the one with the most entries. For 2008, he stayed with Mundill Racing in the Star Mazda championship, this time for a full season entry. His best finish was now a fifth place at Road Atlanta. In the final ranking, he finished 11th.

2009 marked a comeback in SCCA club racing for Rettich. He raced in the SCCA Great Lakes Division in the Spec Racer Ford and Formula Enterprises class for Hippi Racing. He won both titles and the Formula Enterprises June Sprints. The next season was extremely successful for him. Driving for Hippi Racing, Rettich won the revived SCCA Spec Racer Ford Pro Series and scored a second place in the SCCA Pro Formula Enterprises (behind Sean Rayhall). He also swept the SCCA Triple Crown winning the Great Lakes championship, June Sprints and Runoffs.

Rettich founded Alliance Autosport in 2011. Alliance Autosport made its debut at the 2011 24 Hours of Daytona in the GT class. The Porsche 911 GT3 997 was driven by Rettich and Formula Enterprises rival Matthew Schneider. They start 29th and finished 20th. He returned to the Grand-Am Road Racing GT class at Watkins Glen driving for Racers Edge Motorsports in a Mazda RX-8. Alliance Autosport fielded Rettich in the SCCA Pro Formula Enterprises and the SCCA Spec Racer Ford Pro Series. He won the SCCA Pro Formula Enterprises in an impressive way winning nine out of ten races, the other race was won by Matthew Schneider.

The 2012 season started with the 2012 24 Hours of Daytona. Rettich joined Matthew Schneider, Jon Miller, Darryl Shoff and Hal Prewitt at Daytona. Starting 31st the team finished 28th, 41st overall. He ran a partial season in the 2012 U.S. F2000 National Championship National class driving a Van Diemen DP06 Formula Enterprises car. He achieved four podiums in six races and was placed eighth in the standings. Rettich won the Great Lakes Division Formula Enterprises championship, just like in 2011, 2010 and 2009.

== Death ==
On April 12, 2022, Rettich died unexpectedly at his home, aged 37. His memorial service was held on the 23rd. In his memory, the NR2003 league Maverick Cup Series ran the Scott Rettich Sonoma 70.

== Racing record ==
=== SCCA National Championship Runoffs ===
Year	Track	Car	Engine	Class	Finish	Start	Status
2006	Heartland Park	Star	Mazda	Formula Mazda	2	3	Running
2006	Heartland Park	Spec Racer	Ford	Spec Racer Ford	14	19	Running
2009	Road America	Spec Racer	Ford	Spec Racer Ford	4	3	Running
2009	Road America	Van Diemen DP06	Mazda	Formula Enterprises	2	1	Running
2010	Road America	Spec Racer	Ford	Spec Racer Ford	2	4	Running
2010	Road America	Van Diemen DP06	Mazda	Formula Enterprises	1	1	Running
2011	Road America	Spec Racer	Ford	Spec Racer Ford	2	4	Running
2011	Road America	Van Diemen DP06	Mazda	Formula Enterprises	1	1	Running
2012	Road America	Spec Racer	Ford	Spec Racer Ford	4	5	Running
2012	Road America	Van Diemen DP06	Mazda	Formula Enterprises	5	1	Running
2013	Road America	Spec Racer	Ford	Spec Racer Ford	15	45	Running
2013	Road America	Van Diemen DP06	Mazda	Formula Enterprises	1	1	Running
2014	Laguna Seca	Spec Racer	Ford	Spec Racer Ford	4	6	Running
2014	Laguna Seca	Van Diemen DP06	Mazda	Formula Enterprises	1	1	Running
2015	Daytona	Spec Racer	Ford	Spec Racer Ford	13	36	Running
2015	Daytona	Van Diemen DP06	Mazda	Formula Enterprises	1	1	Running
2015	Daytona	Spec Racer	Ford	Spec Racer Ford Gen 3	6	6	Running
2016	Mid-Ohio	Spec Racer	Ford	Spec Racer Ford	3	3	Running
2016	Mid-Ohio	Van Diemen DP06	Mazda	Formula Enterprises	1	1	Running
2016	Mid-Ohio	Spec Racer	Ford	Spec Racer Ford Gen 3	10	6	Running
2017	Indianapolis	Spec Racer	Ford	Spec Racer Ford	3	4	Running
2017	Indianapolis	Mazda ESR	Mazda	Prototype 2	6	8	Running
2017	Indianapolis	Spec Racer	Ford	Spec Racer Ford Gen 3	9	12	Running
2018	Sonoma	Spec Racer	Ford	Spec Racer Ford Gen 3	5	7	Running
2018	Sonoma	Van Diemen DP06	Mazda	Formula Enterprises 2	3	3	Running
2019	VIR	Spec Racer	Ford	Spec Racer Ford Gen 3	10	12	Running
2019	VIR	Van Diemen DP06	Mazda	Formula Enterprises 2	3	3	Running
2020	Road America	Spec Racer	Ford	Spec Racer Ford Gen 3	9	7	Running
2020	Road America	Van Diemen DP06	Mazda	Formula Enterprises 2	7	1	Running
2021	Indianapolis	Spec Racer	Ford	Spec Racer Ford Gen 3	14	20	Running
2021	Indianapolis	Van Diemen DP06	Mazda	Formula Enterprises 2	1	5	Running

=== American Open-Wheel racing results ===
(key) (Races in bold indicate pole position, races in italics indicate fastest race lap)

==== Star Mazda Championship ====
Year	Team	1	2	3	4	5	6	7	8	9	10	11	12	Rank	Points
2007	Keirn Racing	SEB; 19	HOU	VIR	MMP; 17	POR; 12	CLE; 12	TOR; 18	RAM; 9	TRO; 6	MOS; 13	RAT	LAG; 10	**16th**	**208**
2008	Mundill Racing	SEB; 14	UTA; 24	WGI; 15	POR; 23	POR; 18	ROA; 6	TRR; 9	MOS; 21	NJ1; 7	NJ2; 8	ATL; 5	LAG; 22	**11th**	**269**

==== Complete SCCA Pro Formula Enterprises results ====
Year	Entrant	1	2	3	4	5	6	7	8	9	10	Pos	Points
2010	Hippi Racing	ATL; 1; 3	ATL; 2; 1	NJMP; 1; 2	NJMP; 2; 2	MIL; 1; 2	MIL; 2; 3	BIR; 1; 1	BIR; 2; 7	**VIR**; **1**; 1	**VIR**; **2**; 2	**2nd**	**1180**
2011	Alliance Autosport	**VIR**; **1**; 1	**VIR**; **2**; 1	**MOS**; **1**; 1	**MOS**; **2**; 1	**BIR**; **1**; 1	**BIR**; **2**; 1	**MID**; **1**; 1	**MID**; **2**; 1	ATL; 1; 1	ATL; 2; 12	**1st**	**1307**

==== U.S. F2000 National Championship ====
Year	Team	1	2	3	4	5	6	7	8	9	10	11	12	13	14	Rank	Points
2012	Alliance Autosport	SEB; 19	SEB; 16	STP; 14	STP; 18	LOR	MOH; 15	MOH; 27	ROA	ROA	ROA	BAL	BAL	VIR	VIR	**N.C.**	**N.C.**
2013	Alliance Autosport	SEB; 26	SEB; 21	STP; 15	STP; 22	LOR	TOR; 20	TOR; 17	MOH; 21	MOH; 23	MOH; 15	LAG	LAG	HOU; 16	HOU; 13	**N.C.**	**N.C.**
