= Patrick Gallagher (racing driver) =

American racing driver

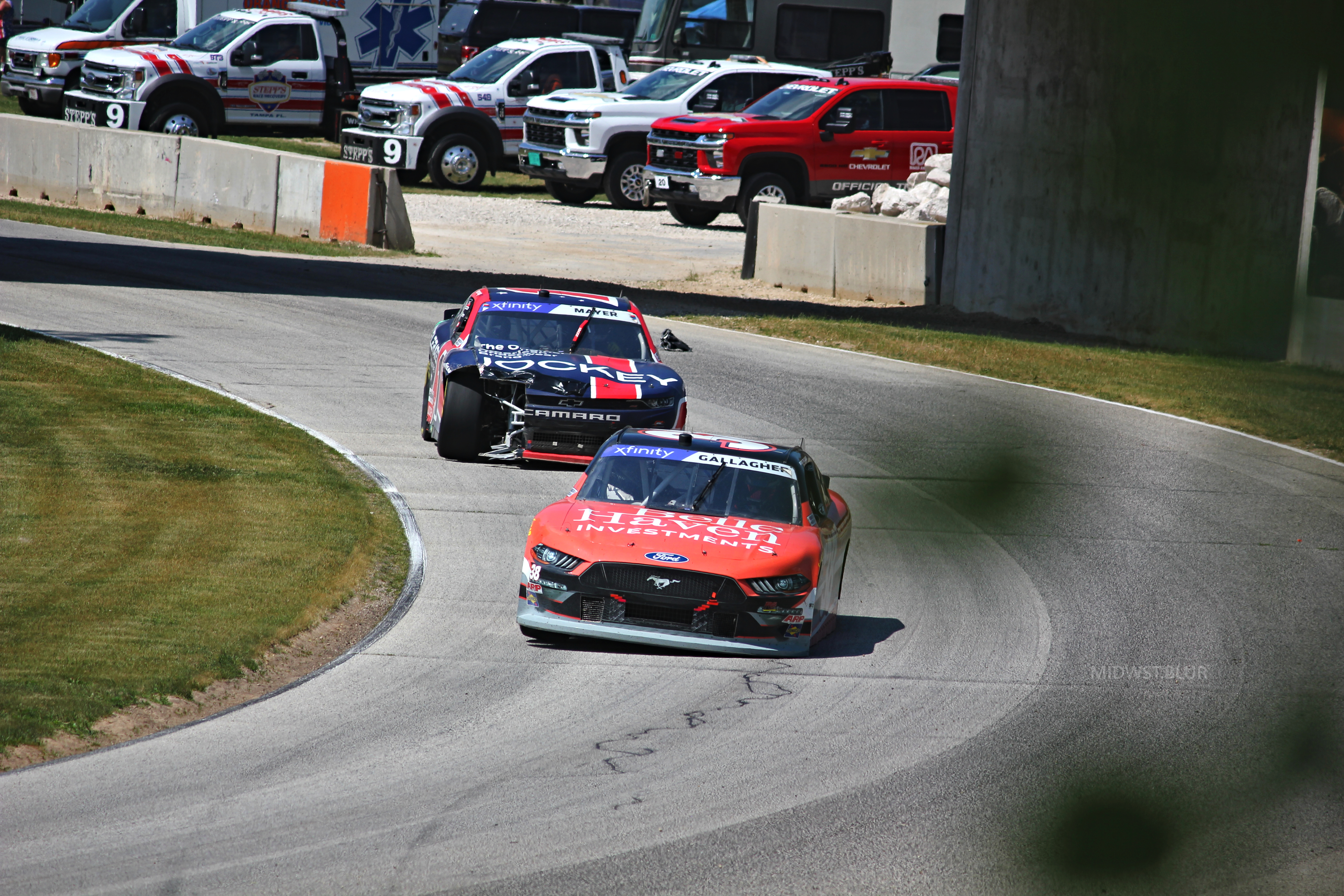
- Nationality: (United States) American
- Born: Patrick Sean Gallagher; October 6, 1992 (age 34) Thornville, Ohio, U.S.
- Categorisation: FIA Silver

NASCAR O'Reilly Auto Parts Series career
- 8 races run over 3 years
- 2024 position: 60th
- Best finish: 50th (2022)
- First race: 2019 B&L Transport 170 (Mid-Ohio)
- Last race: 2024 Pacific Office Automation 147 (Portland)
Wins	Top tens	Poles
0	0	0
- Statistics up to date as of June 1, 2024.

Patrick Sean Gallagher (born October 6, 1992) is an American professional sports car racing and stock car racing driver. He last competed part-time in the NASCAR Xfinity Series, driving the No. 4/6 Chevrolet Camaro for JD Motorsports.

== Racing career ==
=== NASCAR ===
Gallagher made his NASCAR Xfinity Series debut at Mid-Ohio Sports Car Course. He started 37th in the No. 99 B. J. McLeod Motorsports Chevrolet and finished 23rd. He would return to the NASCAR and the Xfinity Series to run the race at Circuit of the Americas in 2022, driving the No. 28 for RSS Racing.

== Motorsports career results ==
=== SCCA National Championship Runoffs ===
Year	Track	Car	Engine	Class	Finish	Start	Status
2009	Road America	Invader QC1	Rotax	Formula 500	2	1	Running
2010	Road America	Van Diemen DP06	Mazda	Formula Enterprises	3	3	Running
2010	Road America	Invader QC1	Rotax	Formula 500	1	2	Running
2011	Road America	Van Diemen DP06	Mazda	Formula Enterprises	4	8	Running
2012	Road America	Van Diemen DP06	Mazda	Formula Enterprises	1	2	Running

=== American Open-Wheel racing results ===
(key) (Races in bold indicate pole position, races in italics indicate fastest race lap)

==== SCCA Pro Formula Enterprises ====
Year	Entrant	1	2	3	4	5	6	7	8	9	10	Pos	Points
2011	JAY Motorsports	VIR; 1; 2	VIR; 2; 2	MOS; 1; 2	MOS; 2; 2	BIR; 1; 2	BIR; 2; 5	MID; 1; 3	MID; 2; 3	ATL; 1; 2	ATL; 2; 10	2nd	1102

==== U.S. F2000 National Championship ====
Year	Team	1	2	3	4	5	6	7	8	9	10	11	12	13	14	Rank	Points
2012	JAY Motorsports	SEB; 22	SEB; 33	STP; 15	STP; 17	LOR	MOH; 18	MOH; 26	ROA; 17	ROA; 20	ROA; 24	BAL; 27	BAL; 13	VIR	VIR	N.C.	-

=== Complete WeatherTech SportsCar Championship results ===
(key) (Races in bold indicate pole position; results in italics indicate fastest lap)

Year	Team	Class	Make	Engine	1	2	3	4	5	6	7	8	9	10	11	12	Pos.	Points
2022	Crucial Motorsports	GTD	McLaren 720S GT3	McLaren M840T 4.0L Turbo V8	DAY; 19	SEB; 14	LBH	LGA	MOH	DET	WGL; 15	MOS	LIM	ELK	VIR	PET	40th	524
2023	Turner Motorsport	GTD	BMW M4 GT3	BMW S58B30T0 3.0 L Twin Turbo I6	DAY; 17	SEB; 2	LBH; 8	MON; 7	WGL; 13	MOS; 13	LIM; 4	ELK; 12	VIR; 2	IMS; 5	PET; 2		4th	2924
2024	Turner Motorsport	GTD	BMW M4 GT3	BMW S58B30T0 3.0 L Twin Turbo I6	DAY; 14	SEB; 6	LBH; 2	LGA; 2	WGL; 5	MOS; 4	ELK; 1	VIR; 4	IMS; 2	PET; 9			2nd	3032
2025	Turner Motorsport	GTD	BMW M4 GT3 Evo	BMW S58B30T0 3.0 L Twin Turbo I6	DAY; 5	SEB; 5	LBH; 5	LGA; 9	WGL; 8	MOS; 8	ELK; 4	VIR; 4	IMS; 4	PET; 8			5th	2739
2026	Turner Motorsport	GTD	BMW M4 GT3 Evo	BMW S58B30T0 3.0 L Twin Turbo I6	DAY; 10	SEB; 5	LBH; 2	LGA; 7	WGL; 7	MOS; 3	ELK; 5	VIR; 2	IMS; 1	PET; 18			2nd	2843

=== NASCAR ===
(key) (Bold – Pole position awarded by qualifying time. Italics – Pole position earned by points standings or practice time. * – Most laps led.)

==== Xfinity Series ====
NASCAR Xfinity Series results
Year	Team	No.	Make	1	2	3	4	5	6	7	8	9	10	11	12	13	14	15	16	17	18	19	20	21	22	23	24	25	26	27	28	29	30	31	32	33	NXSC	Pts	Ref
2019	B. J. McLeod Motorsports	99	Chevy	DAY	ATL	LVS	PHO	CAL	TEX	BRI	RCH	TAL	DOV	CLT	POC	MCH	IOW	CHI	DAY	KEN	NHA	IOW	GLN	MOH; 23	BRI	ROA	DAR	IND	LVS	RCH	CLT	DOV	KAN	TEX	PHO	HOM	70th	14	
2022	RSS Racing	28	Ford	DAY	CAL	LVS	PHO	ATL	COA; 22	RCH	MAR	TAL	DOV	DAR	TEX	CLT	PIR	NSH																			50th	48	
2022	RSS Racing	38	Ford																ROA; 19	ATL	NHA	POC	IND; 28	MCH	GLN; 36	DAY	DAR	KAN	BRI	TEX	TAL	CLT; 33	LVS	HOM	MAR	PHO	50th	48	
2024	JD Motorsports	4	Chevy	DAY	ATL	LVS	PHO	COA; 25	RCH	MAR	TEX	TAL	DOV	DAR	CLT																						60th	25	
2024	JD Motorsports	6	Chevy													PIR; 24	SON	IOW	NHA	NSH	CSC	POC	IND	MCH	DAY	DAR	ATL	GLN	BRI	KAN	TAL	ROV	LVS	HOM	MAR	PHO	60th	25	
