= Formula Enterprises =

Single-Seater Racing Championship

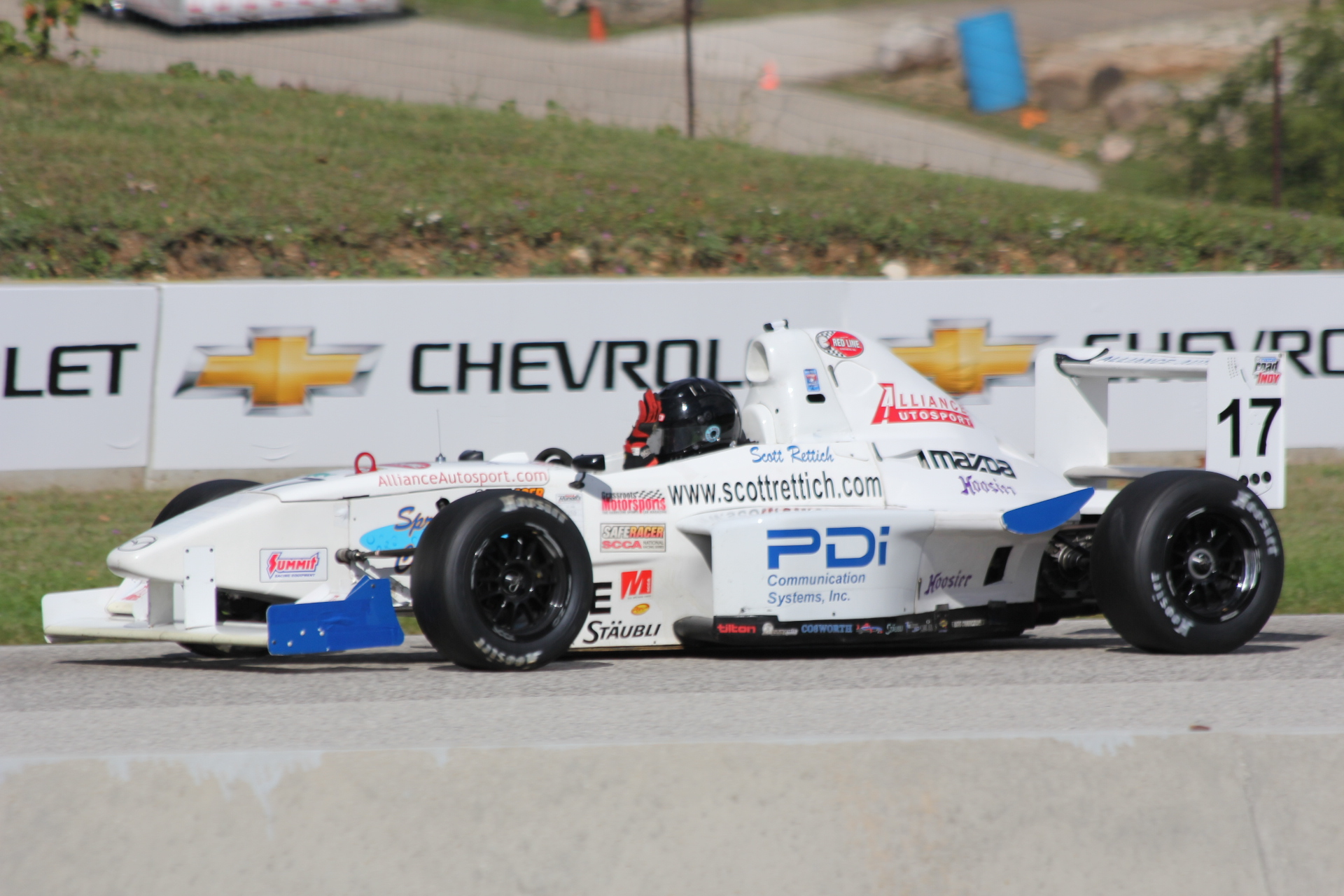
- Scott Rettich celebrates his Formula Enterprises victory at the 2013 SCCA National Championship Runoffs

Motor racing formula
- Category: Formula racing
- Country or region: United States
- Championships: SCCA Club Racing (2002-present); Formula SCCA (2004); IMSA Lites L3 (2007-2009); SCCA Pro Formula Enterprises (2010-2011); USF2000 National Class (2012-2013)
- Inaugural season: 2002
- Status: Active

Formula Enterprises or Formula SCCA is a class of open wheel race car sanctioned by the Sports Car Club of America. A spec racing class, all chassis are produced by SCCA Enterprises in association with Van Diemen and include a sealed Mazda MZR powerplant. The chassis can also be fitted with closed-wheel bodywork and converted into a sportscar to race in C Sports Racer or the L3 class of IMSA Prototype Lites. For the 2012 season, the car was also accepted into the U.S. F2000 National Championship's National Class. According to the manufacturer's website, as of March 2010, 120 of the cars have been sold.

SCCA Enterprises also produces the Spec Racer Ford chassis.

== History ==
The SCCA Enterprises introduced the formula and sports racer in 2002. The formula car was allowed in the Formula Atlantic club racing class. In 2003 SCCA Pro Racing created Sports Racing Pro Series for the formula (FS) and sports racer (SRP) cars. For the 2004 racing season the class was merged with the U.S. F2000 National Championship. Elivan Goulart won the Formula SCCA championship and Neil Tilbor won the SCCA Sportscar Championship. Due to the lack of entries for the 2005 season the series was canceled.

The sports racer was allowed in the IMSA Lites L3 class for the 2007 season. The first season was a reasonable success with 8 drivers competing of which 4 raced the full season. Richard Spicer won the championship with 7 wins out of 12 races. 2008 and 2009 saw a significant downfall in drivers with resp. 2 and 3 drivers competing. Therefore, the IMSA decided to drop the L3 class for 2010.

In 2010 SCCA Pro Racing launched the SCCA Pro Formula Enterprises together with the SCCA Pro Spec Racer class. The Formula Enterprises class raced with moderate success. At the end of the 2011 season it was announced that it would merge with the U.S. F2000 National Championship National Class. The national class also allowed Formula Continental cars. Sixteen-year-old Norwegian driver Henrik Furuseth took the championship for Cape Motorsports. For 2013 the National class only allowed Formula Enterprises cars. However, National class saw poor car counts and the class was discontinued for 2014, again leaving no professional series using the formula.

In 2018 an updated Mazda 2.0L engine and Sadev 6-speed sequential gearbox were introduced to replace the aging 2.3L and 5-speed Elite. The new Formula Enterprises 2 (FE2) spec ran alongside original FE cars in national competition, with champions in each class crowned at the club’s yearly National Championship Runoffs in 2018 and 2019. In 2020, only the new FE2 spec was legal for SCCA National competition relegating original FE spec cars to regional-only competition.

== Specifications ==
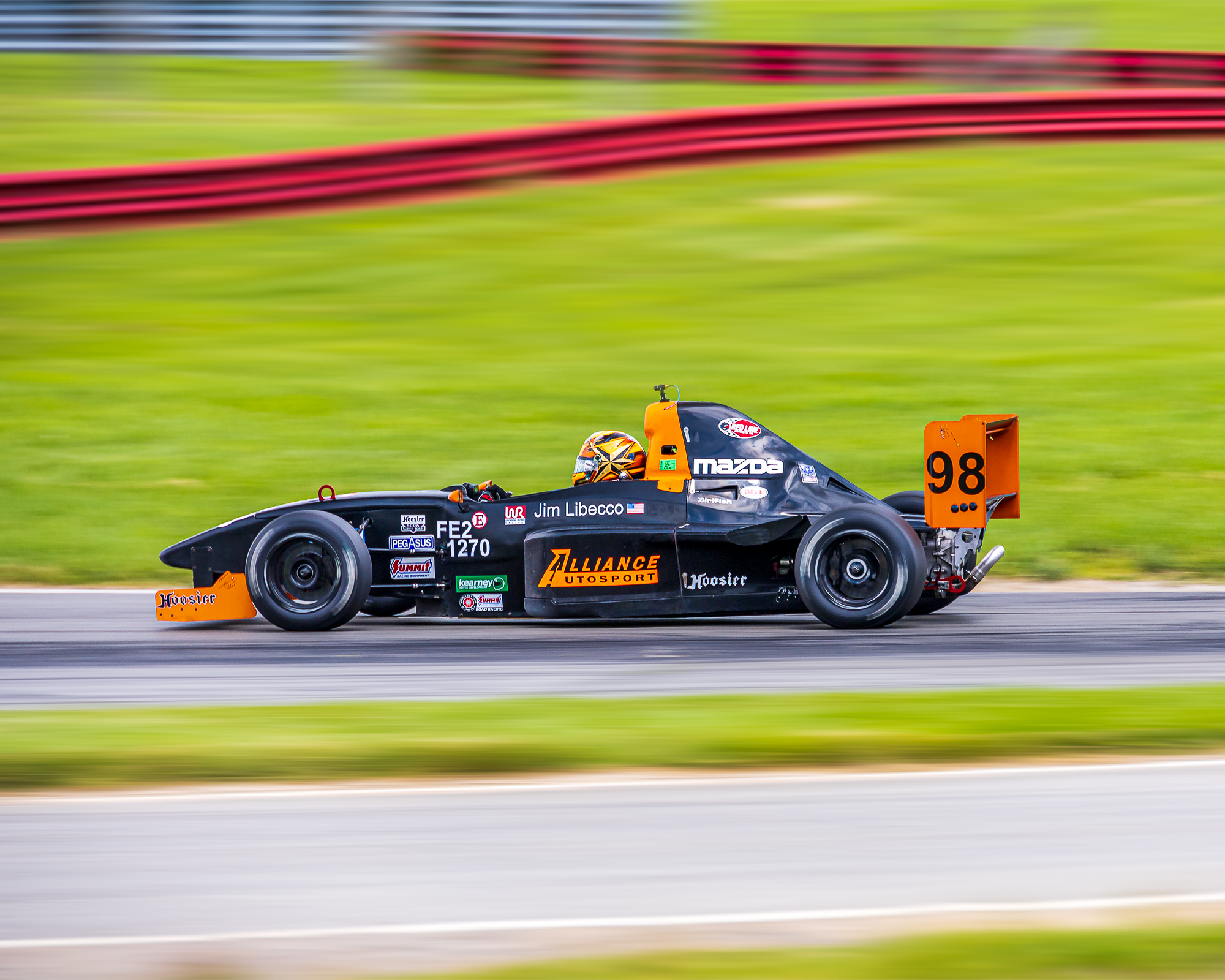
A Formula Enterprise 2 racing at Mid-Ohio

Van Diemen DP06 'Formula Enterprises'
Engine	2.0L Mazda MZR
Valvetrain	Twin cam, 16 Valves
Torque	160 ft-lbs at 4700rpm
Horsepower	185 hp at 5800rpm
Ignition system	electronic fuel ignition
Transmission	6-speed sequential
Suspension	Push rod
Chassis	tubular steel spaceframe
Tires	Hoosier
Weight	Formula: 1270 lbs
Weight	Sports Racer: 1350 lbs

== Notable champions ==
The Formula SCCA is raced in various SCCA national and regional events in the Formula Enterprises and C Sports Racer class. Below is an overview of the most important races and championships.

Year	SCCA National Championship Runoffs	SCCA June Sprints	Formula SCCA	IMSA Lites L3
2004			(United States) Elivan Goulart	
2005-6	No national class Formula SCCA/Enterprises			
2007		(United States) Rusty Mitchell		(United States) Richard Spicer
2008	(United States) Mark Eaton	(United States) Mark Eaton		(United States) Chris Funk
2009	(United States) Nicholas Evans	(United States) Scott Rettich	SCCA Pro Formula Enterprises	(United States) Chris Doyle
2010	(United States) Scott Rettich	(United States) Scott Rettich	(United States) Sean Rayhall	
2011	(United States) Scott Rettich	(United States) Matthew Mai	(United States) Scott Rettich	
2012	(United States) Patrick Gallagher	(United States) Patrick Gallagher	USF2000 National Class	
2012	(United States) Patrick Gallagher	(United States) Patrick Gallagher	(Norway) Henrik Furuseth	
2013	(United States) Scott Rettich	(United States) Scott Rettich	(United States) Scott Rettich	
2014	(United States) Scott Rettich	(United States) Scott Rettich		
2015	(United States) Scott Rettich	(United States) Scott Rettich		
2016	(United States) Scott Rettich	(United States) Scott Rettich		
2017	(United States) Elliot Finlayson	(United States) Dean Oppermann / (United States) Elliot Finlayson		
2018	FE: (United States) Mark Snyder; FE2: (United States) Flinn Lazier	FE: (United States) Scott Rettich (both races); FE2: (United States) Paul Schneider / (Colombia) Mathias Soler-Obel		
2019	FE: (United States) James Libecco; FE2: (United States) Rhett Barkau	FE: (United States) Mark Snyder (both races); FE2: (United States) Liam Snyder / (United States) Scott Rettich		
2020	FE2: (United States) Liam Snyder	FE2: (United States) Kenton Koch / (United States) Max Grau		
2021	FE2: (United States) Scott Rettich	FE2: (United States) Scott Rettich / (United States) Bailey Monette		
2022	FE2: (United States) Bailey Monette	FE2: (United States) Bailey Monette (both races)		
2023	FE2: (United States) Charles Russell Turner	FE2: (United States) Caleb Shrader (both races)		
2024	FE2: (United States) Adam Jennerjahn	FE2: (United States) Adam Jennerjahn / (United States) Caleb Shrader		
2025	FE2: (United States) Franklin Futrelle	FE2: (United States) Gian Buffomante		
