= Spec Racer Ford =

Class of racing car

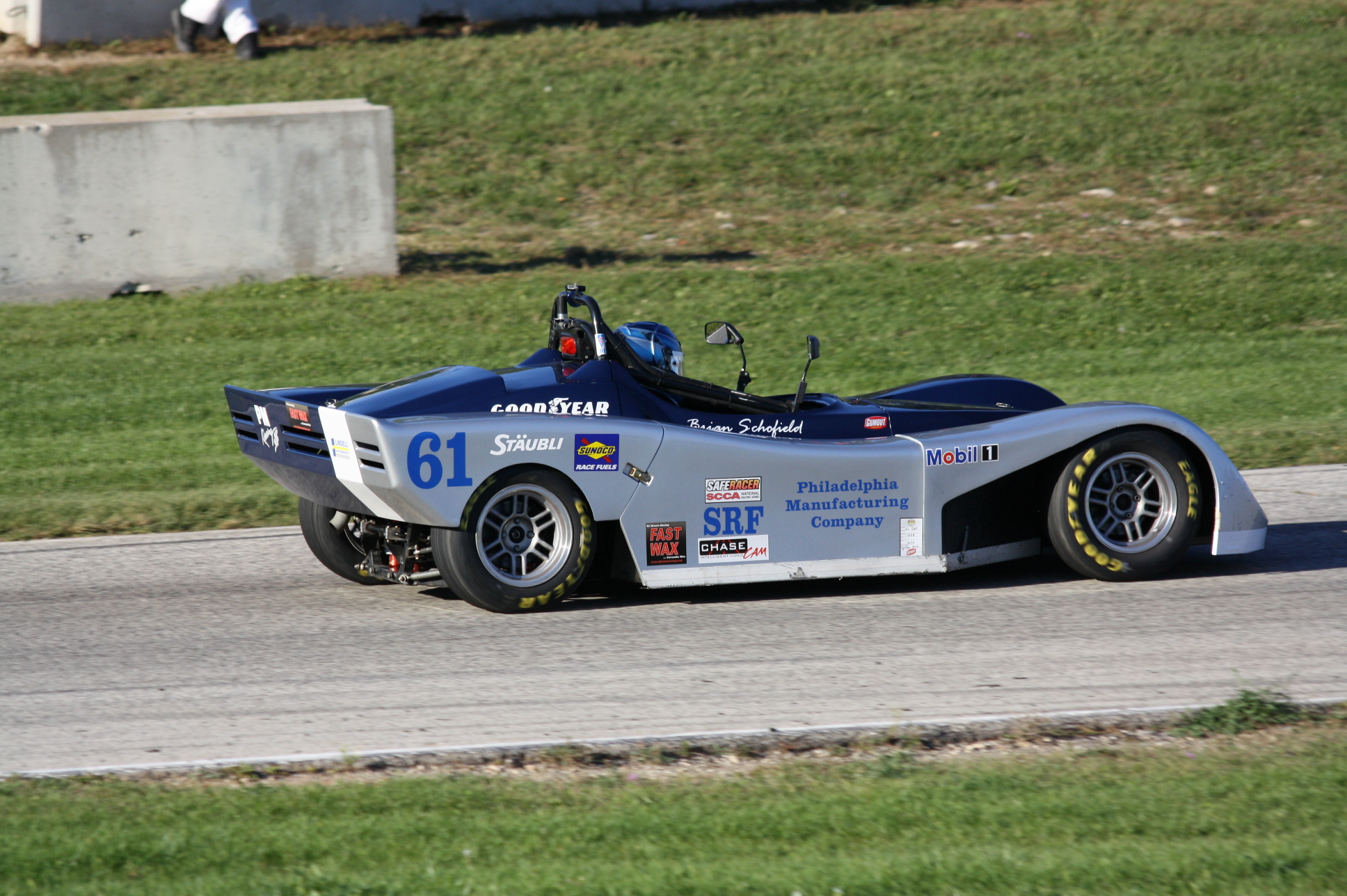
2010 SCCA National Championship Runoffs (U.S.) winner

Spec Racer Ford is a class of racing car used in Sports Car Club of America (SCCA) and other series road racing events. The Spec Racer Ford, manufactured and marketed by SCCA Enterprises (a subsidiary of SCCA, Inc.), is a high performance, closed wheel, open cockpit, purpose-built race car intended for paved road courses, such as WeatherTech Raceway Laguna Seca, Buttonwillow Raceway Park, Road America, Watkins Glen, and many other tracks throughout North America. With more than 1,000 cars manufactured, it is the most successful purpose built road racing car in the United States.

== History ==
the Spec Racer Ford is easily identified by the required "SRF" or "SRF3" designation on either side of the car

Spec Racer was first conceived as low-cost sports racing class by a director of the Sports Car Club of America (SCCA), Ted Cronin, in the early 1980s. The car was developed and originally manufactured by Renault/Jeep Sport USA in Livonia, Michigan under direction of Vic Elford. The car, designed by Roy Lunn, was introduced into SCCA Club Racing in 1984 as "Sports Renault", and priced at just under $10,000. The class debuted as a support race for the 1984 Formula One Detroit Grand Prix. After Renault bowed out of the program in 1989, the car was renamed "Spec Racer (SR)." The original Sports Renault/Spec Racer is now an SCCA Regional-only class and a few Renault powered cars still compete in National Auto Sport Association (NASA), Midwestern Council of Sports Cars Club (MCSCC), Independent Motorsports Group (IMG) and Vintage Racer Group (VRG) events. By 1994, the supply of rebuildable 1.7-liter Renault engines was drying up in the United States. The SCCA made the decision to replace the original Renault drivetrain with a 1.9-liter engine and five-speed transmission manufactured by the Ford Motor Company. This change gave the SRF an additional 10 horsepower (7.5 kW) to 105 - enough to push the cars along at speeds up to 135 mph (217 km/h). Ford Motor Company started to provide a new drivetrain in 1994 and the cars with the Ford powertrain renamed "Spec Racer Ford (SRF)." For a period of time, both Spec Racers (Renault powered) and Spec Racer Ford (Ford powered) both raced in the SCCA. Other more recent changes to what is now called "Spec Racer Ford" include the now-standard "tallman kit", which is an extension of the original rear roll hoop (which was designed too low), Penske shock absorbers in addition to the original Konis, Butler Built driver seat, alloy wheels, rear wheel well cutouts, engine coolant recovery system, adjustable fuel pressure regulator, a safety modification to the brakes and an optional, smaller alternator. During the life of the car, there have been some incremental changes in various parts to increase durability. Tires are Hoosier Racing Tire radials in both dry and rain tire versions, specifically manufactured for the SRF. The SRF still uses the original Renault brake calipers (with the option to change to an updated Wilwood caliper), outer CV joints, and suspension knuckles.

In early 2013, SCCA Enterprises announced a third generation (GEN3) Spec Racer Ford powered by a 1.6-liter 4-cylinder, 135 HP Ford engine fitted to the existing engine mounts and transmission. On-track testing by a fleet of test cars was conducted during 2013 and 2014 for a roll-out into SCCA competition in 2015. As of 2015, the new SRF3, GEN3 class was created and is now racing alongside the previous GEN2 (1.9-liter) cars. The existing Ford 1.9-liter Spec Racer (SRF) will continue to be eligible for SCCA Club Racing a separate National class until the end of 2017 after which it will remain competing in SCCA Club Racing as a Regional-only class.

The SCCA has authorized a six-speed sequential gearbox manufactured by SADEV as an option for the transmission of the SRF3.

== Technical ==
The SRF rules dictate that no performance enhancing modifications other than suspension adjustments within described parameters can be made to the car. This effectively eliminates the never-ending need for design enhancements and associated large cash outlays necessary in other classes of racecars to remain competitive and puts the focus on driver skill, rather than financial and technical investment. Every Spec Racer Ford has the same minimum weight using ballast that can accommodate drivers who weigh up to roughly 260 pounds, uses the same engine, one of two transmissions (the older manual or the newer sequential), the same fiberglass body, the same chassis, even the same tires. The idea is that all of the cars are meant to have identical performance, so the only way to go faster is to be a better driver. The SRF's engine, transmission, and shock absorbers are sealed with tamper-proof devices that make it impossible to modify these components undetected. In addition, many parts of the car, including suspension arms, fiberglass, and sheet metal are marked for compliance checking with special holographic tamper-evident stickers bearing the Spec Racer Ford logo. SCCA Enterprises periodically deploys compliance officials to conduct surprise inspections of Spec Racer Fords at SCCA Major, SCCA Regional and SCCA Pro Racing events across the US.

== Specifications ==
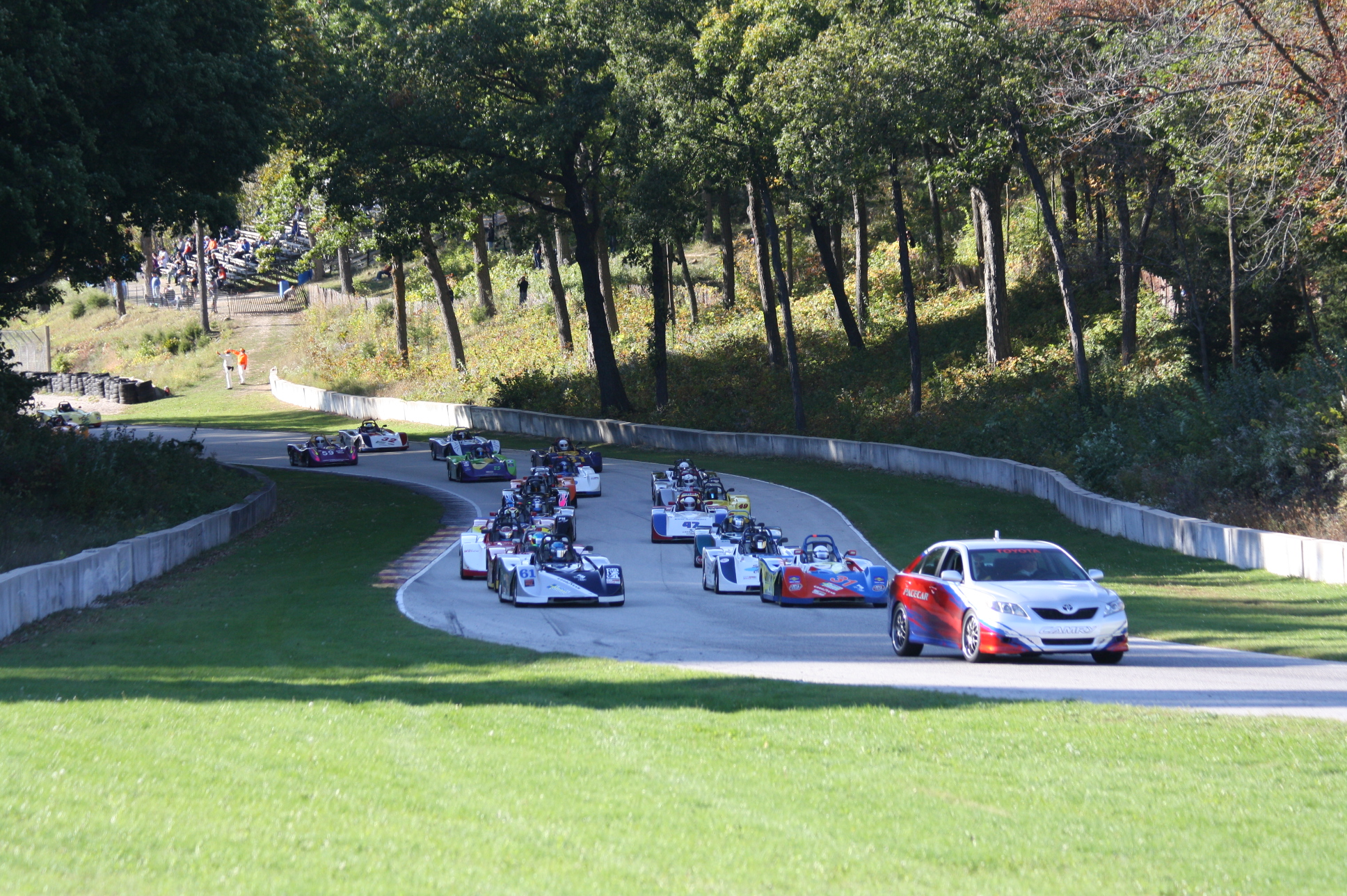
Field for 2010 SCCA National Championships (U.S.) Runoffs

- Tube frame chassis
- Body: fiberglass, 3-section
- Suspension: front/rear rocker arm, coil-over shock/spring, lower "A" arm, dual externally adjustable anti-roll bars
- GEN2 SRF: Ford 1.9L fuel-injected, CVH(canted valve hemi) water-cooled, SOHC 8-valve, hemispherical head, inline 4-cylinder (derived from Ford Escort) and dynamometer tested and sealed by SCCA Enterprises
- GEN3 SRF3: Ford Sigma 1.6L, sequential fuel-injected, DOHC 16-valve, inline 4-cylinder (derived from Ford Fiesta) by Ford Performance and dynamometer tested and sealed by SCCA Enterprises
- ECU: Ford Motorcraft on GEN2, modified for racing, sealed by SCCA Enterprises. New for GEN3 is the Performance Electronics, Ltd. PE3 sealed by SCCA Enterprises.
- Ford 5-speed manual transmission, sealed by SCCA Enterprises (Tilton dual-plate competition clutch, or alternate organic clutch on GEN3)
- Hoosier radial-ply spec slick tire, dry and rain versions available.
- Custom exhaust, spec muffler required on GEN3 SRF3
- Wheels: spec 13-inch alloy from Shelby, Weld or (current supplier) Pack. Can also run spec stamped steel wheels.
- Brake pads: Hawk (spec pads)
- Brake calipers: Original Renault or optional Wilwood
- Clutch and brake master cylinders: AP (original) or Wilwood
- Cockpit-adjustable brake bias
- H-pattern gear shifter or SADEV sequential shifter
- Dampers: Penske Racing (current supplier) or Koni (original, will soon be decertified) -- single adjustable, rebound only—sealed by SCCA Enterprises
- 92 in (2,337 mm) wheelbase
- 1,670 lb (757 kg). GEN2 SRF and 1560 lb GEN3 SRF3, including driver
- Instruments: tachometer, oil pressure, water temperature, alternator warning light, any data acquisition system
- Rain Map Torque Delivery Profile Selector on GEN3 only
- Seat: SCCA Enterprises fiberglass or Butler Aluminum (Butler Head Surround, optional)
- Steering wheel: optional type, driver's choice
- 105 hp (+/- approx. 0.75 hp) GEN2, 135 hp GEN3
- Fuel capacity: 7.75 US gal (29 L; 6 imp gal) ATL Fuel Cell
- Fuel: commercial pump fuel only, usually 93 to 100 octane
- 135 mph (217 km/h) top speed GEN2, 150 mph top speed on GEN3

== Spec Racer Ford at the SCCA National Championship Runoffs ==
Year	Track	Winner (SREN)	Winner (SR)	Winner (SRF)	Winner (SRF3)
1986	Road Atlanta	(United States) Scott Lagasse			
1986	Road Atlanta	(United States) Scott Lagasse			
1987	Road Atlanta	(United States) Mike Davies			
1988	Road Atlanta	(United States) Mike Davies			
1989	Road Atlanta		(United States) David Tenney		
1990	Road Atlanta		(United States) Kyle Konzer		
1991	Road Atlanta		(United States) David Downey		
1992	Road Atlanta		(United States) Mike Davies		
1993	Mid-Ohio		(United States) James Marinangel	(United States) Keith Scharf	
1994	Mid-Ohio		(United States) John Collier, Jr.	(United States) Warren Stilwell	
1995	Mid-Ohio		(United States) Thomas van Camp	(United States) Warren Stilwell	
1996	Mid-Ohio		(United States) John Hollansworth Jr.	(United States) Warren Stilwell	
1997	Mid-Ohio			(United States) Warren Stilwell	
1998	Mid-Ohio			(United States) Warren Stilwell	
1999	Mid-Ohio			(United States) Warren Stilwell	
2000	Mid-Ohio			(United States) Warren Stilwell	
2001	Mid-Ohio			(United States) Richard Spicer	
2002	Mid-Ohio			(United States) Richard Spicer	
2003	Mid-Ohio			(United States) John Black	
2004	Mid-Ohio			(United States) Mike Davies	
2005	Mid-Ohio			(United States) Joseph Colasacco	
2006	Heartland Park			(United States) Michael Miserendino	
2007	Heartland Park			(United States) Michael Miserendino	
2008	Heartland Park			(United States) Michael Miserendino	
2009	Road America			(United States) Michael Miserendino	
2010	Road America			(United States) Brian Schofield	
2011	Road America			(United States) Richard Spicer	
2012	Road America			(United States) Cliff White	
2013	Road America			(United States) Brian Schofield	
2014	Laguna Seca			(United States) Cliff White	
2015	Daytona			(United States) Cliff White	(United States) Kerry Jacobsen
2016	Mid-Ohio			(United States) Todd Harris	(United States) John Black
2017	Indianapolis			(United States) Mike Miserendino	(United States) Tray Ayres
2018	Sonoma				(United States) Robeson Clay Russell
2019	VIR				(United States) Robeson Clay Russell
2020	Road America				(United States) Bobby Sak
2021	Indianapolis				(United States) Bobby Sak
2022	VIR				(United States) Franklin Futrelle
2023	VIR				(United States) Franklin Futrelle
2024	Road America				(United States) Charles Russell Turner

== Gaming / simulation ==
- The Gen 3 Spec Racer Ford is available in iRacing
- The Gen 2 is available as a freeware download for rFactor.
- The Gen 2 is available as a freeware download for Assetto Corsa.
