= 2023 SCCA National Championship Runoffs =

2023 SCCA amateur racing event

The 2023 SCCA National Championship Runoffs was the 60th running of the SCCA National Championship Runoffs. It took place from September 23 to October 1, 2023 at Virginia International Raceway.

Top drivers from the 2023 SCCA road racing season (Super Tour, Majors Tour, and regionals) in 24 classes were invited. Additionally, the event also hosted the championship round of 2023 Spec MX-5 Challenge.

== Schedule ==
Races
Time	Race Day 1 - Sep 29	Race Day 2 - Sep 30	Race Day 3 - Oct 1
8:15	American Sedan (AS)	Spec MX-5 Race 1	B-Spec
9:15	F Production (FP)	Touring 1 (T1)	Formula 600 (F600)
10:15	Formula Enterprises 2 (FE2)	E Production (EP)	Grand Touring Lite (GTL)
11:15	Grand Touring 2 (GT2)	Super Touring Lite (STL)	Formula F (FF)
12:00	Lunch Break		
13:00	Spec Miata (SM)	Spec Racer Ford Gen 3 (SRF3)	Super Touring Under (STU)
14:00	Grand Touring 3 (GT3)	Formula Continental (FC)	H Production (HP)
15:00	Touring 4 (T4)	Formula Vee (FV)	Touring 2 (T2)
16:00	Prototype 2 (P2)	Touring 3 (T3)	Spec MX-5 Race 2
17:00	Prototype 1 (P1)		

== Race results ==
Races are scheduled for 15 laps (49.050 miles (78.938 km)) with time limit of 40 minutes.

Due to low entry size and withdrawals throughout qualifying, the race for Grand Touring 1 class was cancelled.

=== Touring 1 (T1) ===
Pos	No.	Driver	Car	Laps	Time/Gap
1	33	(Pennsylvania) Andrew Aquilante	Ford Mustang	15	29:05.593
2	46	(Illinois) Mark Boden	BMW E92 M3	15	+13.359
3	134	(Florida) James Candelaria	Chevrolet Corvette	15	+25.976
4	44	(North Carolina) Tony Ave	Mercedes-AMG GT4	15	+42.339
5	23	(Connecticut) Hugh Stewart	BMW E46 M3	15	+42.465
6	0	(Washington (state)) Scotty B. White	Dodge Viper SRT RT-10	15	+1:09.501
7	07	(Virginia) Dustin Cornell	Ford Mustang GT	15	+1:17.945
8	42	(Texas) Paolo Salvatore	Ford Mustang FP350S	15	+1:18.422
9	60	(Washington (state)) Thad Berger	Porsche Cayman	15	+1:28.175
10	88	(Virginia) Robert Korzen	Ford Mustang	15	+1:41.739
11	48	(Connecticut) Brian Goodman	BMW E46 M3	14	+1 Lap
12	4	(South Carolina) Ann Doherty	Porsche Cayman	9	+6 Laps

=== Touring 2 (T2) ===
Pos	No.	Driver	Car	Laps	Time/Gap
1	37	(Pennsylvania) Kurt Rezzetano	Ford Mustang GT	15	37:53.503
2	0	(Washington (state)) Scotty B. White	Dodge Viper SRT-10	15	+2.867
3	46	(Illinois) Mark Boden	Porsche 911 (997)	15	+9.939
4	35	(Michigan) John Heinricy	Cadillac CT4-V Blackwing	15	+10.267
5	73	(Pennsylvania) David Sanders	Chevrolet Corvette C5 Z06	15	+10.534
6	23	(Illinois) Alan Kossof	Porsche 911 (996)	15	+16.469
7	45	(Illinois) Joe Boden	Porsche Carrera S	15	+16.998
8	3	(Illinois) Matthew O'Toole	Porsche 911 (997)	15	+32.030
9	18	(Illinois) Aaron Kaplan	BMW M2 CS Cup	15	+32.370
10	12	(Massachusetts) Brian LaCroix	Chevrolet Corvette C6	15	+30.282 (Note: Two-places position penalty.)
11	14	(Texas) Scott Sewell	Porsche Cayman GTS	15	+39.755
12	146	(New Jersey) Alan Phillips	Ford Mustang GT	15	+44.020
DNF	34	(Illinois) Tom O'Toole	BMW M2 CS Cup	5	Retired

=== Touring 3 (T3) ===
Pos	No.	Driver	Car	Laps	Time/Gap
1	26	(Texas) Steve Ott	BMW Z4 M	14	32:31.526
2	09	(Florida) Jason Ott	BMW Z4 M	14	+0.333
3	30	(Connecticut) Travis Washay	Volkswagen GTI	14	+1.268
4	06	(Colorado) James Leithauser	BMW Z4 M	14	+2.030
5	29	(Washington, D.C.) Shaoyi Che	Toyota 86	14	+2.397
6	4	(Virginia) Rob Hines	Nissan 350Z Nismo	14	+3.368
7	19	(Massachusetts) Francis Selldorff	BMW M3	14	+4.005
8	81	(Washington (state)) Simon Asselin	BMW E46	14	+4.907
9	28	(New York (state)) Jared Lendrum	Subaru WRX STI	14	+6.155
10	88	(Virginia) Anthony Piselli	Subaru WRX STI	14	+7.274
11	17	(Wisconsin) Steve Smyczek	Nissan 370Z Track	14	+8.129
12	44	(Washington (state)) J. David Orem	BMW E46	14	+8.129
13	87	(Delaware) Ben Slechta	Nissan 350Z Nismo	14	+10.235
14	39	(Maine) Edward Karabec	BMW E46	14	+11.216
15	10	(Washington (state)) Randy Johnson	Ford Mustang V6	14	+11.837
16	13	(Massachusetts) Frank Selldorff	BMW 330i/ci	14	+13.161
17	53	(Connecticut) Allen Briere	Volkswagen GTI	14	+13.817
18	5	(Washington (state)) Chris Hart	Nissan 370Z Nismo	11	+3 Laps

=== Touring 4 (T4) ===
Pos	No.	Driver	Car	Laps	Time/Gap
1	11	(North Carolina) Devin Anderson	Subaru BRZ	15	40:13.776
2	83	(South Carolina) Christian Braunlich	Mazda RX-8	15	+0.075
3	95	(Arizona) Jonathan Neudorf	Mazda Miata	15	+0.492
4	51	(New Hampshire) Raymond Blethen	Mazda RX-8	15	+1.716
5	98	(North Carolina) Kevin Fryer	Mazda MX-5	15	+3.287
6	118	(Texas) Sergio Zlobin	Mazda MX-5	15	+5.945
7	186	(Massachusetts) Nick Leverone	Subaru BRZ	15	+9.757
8	04	(New York (state)) Jaden Lander	Mazda MX-5	15	+9.904
9	80	(Connecticut) Richard Astacio	Mazda MX-5	15	+10.134
10	50	(New Hampshire) Stephen Blethen	Mazda RX-8	15	+16.538
11	18	(Virginia) Owen Schefer	Mazda RX-8	15	+16.826
12	21	(Maryland) Christopher Windsor	Mazda MX-5	15	+21.470
13	34	(North Carolina) Jeff Giordano	Mazda MX-5	15	+21.840
14	142	(Texas) Paolo Salvatore	Ford Mustang V6	15	+22.370
15	46	(New York (state)) Ayden Rose	Mazda MX-5	15	+22.511
16	3	(Maryland) Brent Simonson	Mazda RX-8	15	+33.323
17	68	(South Carolina) Ron Munnerlyn	Mazda MX-5	15	+48.065
18	29	(North Carolina) John McLendon	Mazda MX-5	15	+1:15.648
19	09	(North Carolina) Morgan Mehler	Mazda MX-5	15	+1:15.790
20	24	(New York (state)) Ken Lendrum	Subaru BRZ	13	+2 Laps
21	69	(Maryland) Jeremy Butz	Mazda MX-5	8	+7 Laps
DNF	85	(North Carolina) Christopher Deen	Scion FR-S	5	Retired
DNF	31	(Pennsylvania) Marshall Mast	Toyota 86	2	Retired
DNS	131	(North Carolina) Mathew Milford	Honda Civic Si		Did not start

=== B-Spec ===
Pos	No.	Driver	Car	Laps	Time/Gap
1	11	(Pennsylvania) Richard Hromin	Mini Cooper	15	39:58.318
2	14	(Texas) Conner Kelleher	Mini Cooper	15	+0.967
3	22	(Texas) Riley Salyer	Mazda 2	15	+1.078
4	01	(Indiana) David Daughtery	Ford Fiesta	15	+0.462
5	24	(Ohio) Trenton Kramer	Mini Cooper	15	+14.042
6	7	(Michigan) Matt Wolfe	Mazda 2	15	+24.322
7	46	(Texas) Chris Taylor	Mazda 2	15	+24.532
8	40	(North Carolina) Stewart Black	Chevrolet Sonic	15	+24.884
9	12	(New Hampshire) Steve Introne	Mini Cooper	15	+25.944
10	10	(Indiana) Chris Daugherty	Honda Fit	15	+26.610
11	28	(New York (state)) Jared Lendrum	Mini Cooper	15	+35.480
12	85	(Missouri) Peter Zekert	Honda Fit	15	+37.681
13	16	(Michigan) Frank Schwartz	Mini Clubman	15	+43.700
14	3	(Massachusetts) J. B. Swan	Chevrolet Sonic	15	+44.808
15	38	(North Carolina) Clayton Condrey	Mini Cooper	15	+46.928
16	07	(Indiana) George Badger	Mini Cooper	15	+53.416
17	51	(North Carolina) Richard Osborne	Nissan Versa Note	15	+1:28.456
18	86	(New Hampshire) Anthony Ruddy	Chevrolet Sonic	12	+3 Laps
19	8	(Florida) Luke Russell	Honda Fit	15	0 Lap (Note: Three-places position penalty.)
20	79	(New Jersey) Brandon Lewis	Ford Fiesta	7	+8 Laps
21	05	(Virginia) Steve Strickland	Mazda 2	7	+8 Laps
DNF	87	(North Carolina) Blair Deffenbaugh	Honda Fit	4	Retired
DNF	34	(Florida) Clay Keel	Mazda 2	1	Retired
DNF	19	(North Carolina) Josh Schmidt	Chevrolet Sonic	0	Retired
DNS	36	(Texas) Joe McClughan	Mazda 2		Did not start

=== E Production (EP) ===
Pos	No.	Driver	Car	Laps	Time/Gap
1	2	(Florida) Greg Ira	BMW Z3 2.5L	8	50:28.473
2	89	(Wisconsin) Jon Brakke	BMW Z3 2.5L	8	+2.588
3	5	(North Carolina) Peter Norton	Lotus/Caterham 7 America	8	+2.997
4	06	(North Carolina) Doug Piner	BMW Z3 2.5L	8	+26.229
5	61	(Canada) Heikki Silegren	Nissan 240Z	8	+29.157
6	41	(Oregon) Austin Bradshaw	Mazda RX-7	8	+29.551
7	9	(Tennessee) Don Tucker	Mazda Miata	8	+50.863
8	30	(North Carolina) Steve Rose	Mazda RX-7	8	+51.499
9	148	(Florida) Sean Saggese	Mazda RX-7	8	+52.304
10	14	(Florida) Matthew Fritz	BMW 325i/is (E36)	8	+53.569
11	18	(North Carolina) Steve Eckerich	Mazda RX-8	8	+1:04.156
12	38	(North Carolina) Ron Earp	Ford Mustang	8	+1:04.398
13	4	(New Hampshire) Anthony Parker	Triumph GT6	8	+1:09.357
14	17	(North Carolina) Michael Cooke	Mazda RX-7	8	+1:16.966
15	98	(North Carolina) Mark Bradley	BMW Z3 2.8L	8	+1:20.045
16	162	(Florida) John Bell	Mazda RX-7	8	+1:23.370
17	50	(Missouri) Mark Weber	Mazda Miata	8	+1:24.075
18	95	(New Jersey) John Hainsworth	Mazda RX-7	7	+1 Lap
19	122	(Michigan) Lance Loughman	Nissan 240Z	7	+1 Lap
DNF	44	(North Carolina) Jeff Young	Triumph TR8	1	Retired
DNF	136	(North Carolina) David Spillman	BMW 325i/is	1	Retired
DNF	33	(Connecticut) Greg Amy	Honda Civic Si	1	Retired
DNF	77	(Florida) Yuri Collazos	Mazda RX-7	0	Retired
DNS	62	(Florida) Steve Shelton	BMW 325i/is (E36)		Did not start

=== F Production (FP) ===
Pos	No.	Driver	Car	Laps	Time/Gap
1	51	(Florida) Ken Kannard	Acura Integra LS	15	35:34.489
2	36	(Missouri) Cliff Ira	Honda Civic Del Sol Si VTEC	15	+0.123
3	73	(Ohio) Kevin Ruck	Acura Integra	15	+1.714
4	52	(Ohio) Mason Workman	Mazda Miata	15	+2.786
5	89	(Pennsylvania) Charlie Campbell	Mazda Miata	15	+3.280
6	3	(Canada) Doug Weaver	Mazda Miata	15	+21.930
7	33	(North Carolina) Les Chaney	Acura Integra	15	+59.598
8	5	(Florida) Richard Gallup	Mazda Miata	15	+1:01.122
9	13	(Virginia) Steffen Clark	Mazda Miata	15	+1:02.881
10	71	(Virginia) Steven Layfield	Mazda Miata	15	+1:09.814
11	154	(New York (state)) David Colbey	Acura Integra LS	15	+1:10.656
12	28	(Ohio) David Strittmatter	Acura Integra	15	+1:17.083
13	35	(Virginia) George "Spike" Behning	Mazda Miata	15	+1:40.344
14	48	(Tennessee) Gregg Seigart	Mazda Miata	15	+2:24.448
15	50	(Missouri) Mark Weber	Mazda Miata	12	+3 Laps
16	131	(North Carolina) Ben Glowka	Acura Integra	11	+4 Laps
17	63	(Texas) Stephen Simonds	Mazda Miata	10	+5 Laps
18	64	(Texas) Perry Simonds	Mazda Miata	8	+7 Laps
DNF	99	(Georgia (U.S. state)) Michael Kamalian	Mazda Miata	5	Retired
DNF	08	(Colorado) Bill Hingston	Mazda Miata	3	Retired
DNS	31	(Pennsylvania) Stephen C. Hyatt	Dodge Neon ACR		Did not start

=== H Production (HP) ===
Pos	No.	Driver	Car	Laps	Time/Gap
1	1	(Illinois) Chris Schaafsma	Volkswagen Golf	15	34:00.944
2	18	(Wisconsin) Steve Sargis	Triumph Spitfire	15	+16.327
3	3	(Missouri) Chris W. Albin	Volkswagen Golf	15	+34.794
4	60	(Tennessee) Vesa Silegren	Honda CRX	15	+45.936
5	199	(Florida) Mike Ogren	Volkswagen Scirocco	15	+46.084
6	36	(Tennessee) Will Perry	Honda CRX Si	15	+1:05.813
7	42	(Illinois) Angus Crome	Volkswagen Golf	15	+1:29.066
8	15	(Wisconsin) Greg Gauper	Honda Civic Si	15	+1:29.184
9	11	(New York (state)) Enrik Benazic	Honda Civic Si	15	+1:42.028
10	38	(Ohio) Scott Hileman	Volkswagen Scirocco	15	+1:51.283
11	08	(New York (state)) Matthew Benazic	Honda Civic Si	15	+1:52.330
12	98	(South Carolina) Michael Miller	Austin-Healey Sprite	15	+2:20.188
13	53	(New Jersey) Edward Werry	Honda Fit	15	+2:20.243
14	06	(Canada) Joe Camilleri	Volkswagen Scirocco	14	+1 Lap
15	19	(Michigan) Frank Schwartz	Mini Cooper	14	+1 Lap
16	69	(Georgia (U.S. state)) John Fine	Honda Civic Si	14	+1 Lap
17	81	(Colorado) Jerry Oleson	Austin-Healey Sprite	14	+1 Lap
18	80	(Michigan) Kendall Jones	MG Midget	12	+3 Laps
19	90	(Maryland) Tom Broring	Triumph Spitfire	12	+3 Laps
20	7	(Illinois) William Trainer	Volkswagen Scirocco	10	+5 Laps
21	84	(New York (state)) Vincent LaManna	Volkswagen Rabbit	9	+6 Laps
22	00	(New York (state)) Jason LaManna	Volkswagen Rabbit	11	+4 Laps
DNF	75	(Missouri) Jack Schulz	MG Midget	4	Retired
DNF	131	(Pennsylvania) Taylor Hyatt	Volkswagen Golf	4	Retired
DNS	5	(North Carolina) Charles Guest	MG Midget		Did not start

=== Super Touring Under (STU) ===
Pos	No.	Driver	Car	Laps	Time/Gap
1	18	(Pennsylvania) Chip Herr	Audi A4	15	31:10.521
2	19	(Maryland) Mark Liller	Dodge Neon SRT-4	15	+37.250
3	199	(Florida) Jose Osiris Pena	Toyota GT86	15	+1:12.769
4	190	(Texas) David Fiorelli	Ford Mustang	15	+1:29.666
5	70	(Virginia) Darin Treakle	BMW 325	14	+1 Lap
6	75	(Utah) James Slechta	Nissan 300ZX	14	+1 Lap
7	36	(Texas) Joe Moser	Honda CRX Si	14	+1 Lap
8	74	(Maine) Michal Kuna	BMW M3	14	+1 Lap
9	69	(New York (state)) Michael Reece	Honda S2000	14	+1 Lap
10	17	(Washington (state)) Whitfield Gregg	Mazda Miata	14	+1 Lap
11	72	(New York (state)) Anthony Geraci	Lotus Exige	12	+3 Laps
12	4	(North Carolina) Johan Schwartz	Porsche 944	10	+5 Laps
DNF	165	(Puerto Rico) Jorge Nazario	Mazda MX-5	4	Retired
DNF	92	(Ohio) John Schmitt	Honda Accord	1	Retired

=== Super Touring Lite (STL) ===
Pos	No.	Driver	Car	Laps	Time/Gap
1	36	(Texas) Joe Moser	Honda CR-X Si	15	31:55.016
2	9	(Florida) Danny Steyn	Mazda MX-5	15	+0.130
3	199	(Florida) Jose Osiris Pena	Honda CRX	15	+24.231
4	39	(Georgia (U.S. state)) Mike Taylor	Acura Integra	15	+24.755
5	22	(Ohio) Max Gee	Honda Prelude	15	+31.282
6	57	(North Carolina) Chuck Hines	Mazda MX-5	15	+1:00.045
7	48	(Florida) Jon Sewell	Acura Integra Type R	15	+1:10.218
8	18	(Georgia (U.S. state)) Zsolt Ferenczy	Acura Integra GS-R	15	+1:23.913
9	81	(North Carolina) Nathan Pring	Ford Mustang	15	+1:26.713
10	37	(Washington (state)) Amy Mills	Mazda Miata	15	+1:28.295
11	42	(North Carolina) Brian Hooper	Honda Civic Si	15	+1:47.478
12	182	(Virginia) Theodore Cahall	Mazda Miata	15	+2:00.590
13	10	(South Carolina) Austin Hilliard	Honda S2000	14	+1 Lap
14	84	(North Carolina) Robert McManus	Mazda RX-8	14	+1 Lap
15	65	(North Carolina) Neil Gueldner	Mazda RX-7	14	+1 Lap
16	71	(Virginia) Brad Williams	Mazda Miata	14	+1 Lap
17	78	(Ohio) Dan Harding	Mazda Miata	14	+1 Lap
18	17	(Washington (state)) Whitfield Gregg	Mazda Miata	14	+1 Lap
19	141	(Virginia) Steve Hunt	Mazda Miata	8	+7 Lap
DNF	40	(Florida) David Palfenier	Mazda MX-5	1	Retired
DNS	28	(North Carolina) Michael Sperber	Ford Focus ZX3		Did not start
DNS	109	(Florida) Chris Clarke	Mazda MX-5		Did not start

=== Grand Touring 1 (GT1) ===
Race cancelled.

=== Grand Touring 2 (GT2) ===
Pos	No.	Driver	Car	Laps	Time/Gap
1	01	(Pennsylvania) Jared Odrick	Porsche 991.2 GT3 Cup	15	28:39.125
2	32	(Texas) Barry Boes	Ford Mustang	15	+0.348
3	36	(Illinois) Daniel Bender	Chevrolet Camaro	15	+11.072
4	50	(Ohio) Tom Patton	Sunbeam Tiger	15	+20.475
5	81	(Washington (state)) Simon Asselin	Porsche 991.1 GT3 Cup	15	+26.978
6	02	(Texas) Michael Quattlebaum	Chevrolet Corvette	15	+34.850
7	7	(North Carolina) Al Rowland	Chevrolet Camaro	15	+39.064
8	165	(Puerto Rico) Jorge Nazario	Chevrolet Corvette	15	+43.566
9	0	(Washington (state)) Scotty B. White	Dodge Viper Comp. Coupe	15	+59.931
10	15	(Georgia (U.S. state)) Jack Stanford	Chevrolet SS	15	+1:08.461
11	38	(Ohio) William Moore	Chevrolet Camaro	15	+1:28.934
12	84	(Ohio) Dan Harding	Porsche 996	13	+2 Laps
13	44	(North Carolina) Tony Ave	Nissan 350Z	10	+5 Laps
DNF	10	(Texas) Paul Ruth	Pontiac Grand Prix	3	Retired
DNF	184	(Texas) Paolo Salvatore	Ford Mustang	1	Retired
DNS	98	(North Carolina) Pete Peterson	Toyota Celica		Did not start

=== Grand Touring 3 (GT3) ===
Pos	No.	Driver	Car	Laps	Time/Gap
1	44	(North Carolina) Tony Ave	Acura RSX	15	30:18.370
2	63	(Georgia (U.S. state)) Jeff Dernehl	Mazda RX-7	15	+20.725
3	37	(Virginia) Warren Montague	Toyota Celica	15	+27.496
4	56	(Florida) Zachary Hollingshead	Mazda Miata	15	+1:41.575
5	7	(Florida) Ray Stephenson	Mazda RX-7	14	+1 Lap
6	98	(New Jersey) Timothy Proctor	Nissan 240SX	14	+1 Lap
7	26	(Arkansas) Chris Edens	Mazda Miata	7	+8 Laps
8	32	(California) Michael Lewis	Mazda RX-7	7	+8 Laps
DNS	41	(Canada) Joe Kristensen	Honda Civic		Did not start

=== Grand Touring Lite (GTL) ===
Pos	No.	Driver	Car	Laps	Time/Gap
1	22	(West Virginia) Graham Fuller	Toyota Tercel	15	33:04.858
2	32	(California) Michael Lewis	Mazda RX-7	15	+0.316
3	9	(New York (state)) James Gregorius	Mazda RX-7	15	+28.610
4	72	(Florida) Peter Shadowen	Honda CRX	15	+41.697
5	03	(Connecticut) Chris Kopley	Mini Cooper	15	+42.461
6	04	(Colorado) Jonathan Goodale	Mazda MX-5	15	+1:00.673
7	98	(Missouri) Roy Lopshire	Toyota Tercel	14	+1 Lap
8	37	(North Carolina) David Blain	Mazda Miata	14	+1 Lap
9	41	(West Virginia) Kenneth Berdine	MG Midget	13	+2 Laps
10	78	(Pennsylvania) Roger Welling	Nissan 200SX	7	+8 Laps
DNF	77	(Michigan) Eric Vickerman	Mazda MX-3	0	Retired

=== Formula Enterprises 2 (FE2) ===
Pos	No.	Driver	Car	Laps	Time/Gap
1	32	(Virginia) Charles Russell Turner	SCCA Mazda FE2	11	42:40.543
2	97	(Georgia (U.S. state)) Franklin Futrelle	SCCA Mazda FE2	11	+0.434
3	99	(Oregon) Caleb Shrader	SCCA Mazda FE2	11	+0.851
4	71	(California) Adam Jennerjahn	SCCA Mazda FE2	11	+1.887
5	73	(North Carolina) Paul Schneider	SCCA Mazda FE2	11	+3.515
6	11	(Virginia) Justin Huffman	SCCA Mazda FE2	11	+4.281
7	22	(Arizona) John Yeatman	SCCA Mazda FE2	11	+5.951
8	145	(North Carolina) Bryan Yates	SCCA Mazda FE2	11	+6.797
9	33	(Maryland) Sam Harrington	SCCA Mazda FE2	11	+8.513
10	5	(Georgia (U.S. state)) Bailey Monette	SCCA Mazda FE2	11	+9.055
11	18	(Texas) Steve Whitston	SCCA Mazda FE2	11	+9.647
12	47	(Texas) Darryl Wills	SCCA Mazda FE2	11	+7.817
13	88	(Florida) Thomas Green	SCCA Mazda FE2	11	+12.222
14	0	(Massachusetts) James Regan	SCCA Mazda FE2	11	+13.406
15	38	(Florida) Alastair McEwan	SCCA Mazda FE2	11	+15.547
16	45	(Washington (state)) Tom Burt	SCCA Mazda FE2	11	+16.820
17	43	(Tennessee) Craig Haltom	SCCA Mazda FE2	11	+17.630
18	51	(South Carolina) Marc Stern	SCCA Mazda FE2	11	+20.035
19	28	(North Carolina) James Brookshire	SCCA Mazda FE2	8	+3 Laps
DNF	89	(Virginia) Jamison Huffman	SCCA Mazda FE2	0	Retired
DNF	29	(Michigan) Kelton Jago	SCCA Mazda FE2	0	Retired
DNF	56	(Arizona) Matthew Romer	SCCA Mazda FE2	0	Retired
DNF	86	(Virginia) Eric Cruz	SCCA Mazda FE2	0	Retired
DNF	19	(Florida) Todd Vanacore	SCCA Mazda FE2	0	Retired
DNF	27	(Illinois) Dean Oppermann	SCCA Mazda FE2	0	Retired
DNF	67	(Maryland) Jonathan Weisheit	SCCA Mazda FE2	0	Retired

=== Formula Continental (FC) ===
Pos	No.	Driver	Car	Laps	Time/Gap
1	61	(Michigan) Nolan Allaer	Van Diemen RF02	15	33:08.525
2	52	(Michigan) Robert Allaer	Van Diemen RF02	15	+5.389
3	88	(Virginia) Tim Minor	Citation US2000	15	+7.165
4	41	(Pennsylvania) Glenn Cordova	Van Diemen RF04	15	+9.381
5	122	(Colorado) Hunter Tatman	Van Diemen RF06	15	+9.624
6	45	(Michigan) Dean Kiriluk	Van Diemen RF01	15	+10.031
7	24	(Florida) Chris Scharnow	Van Diemen RF01	15	+12.076
8	65	(Wisconsin) Michael Varacins	Van Diemen F2000	15	+12.118
9	4	(Michigan) Kevin Fandozzi	Mygale SJ2012H	15	+23.840
10	26	(Maryland) Rick Silver	Van Diemen RF98	8	+7 Laps
DNF	33	(Pennsylvania) John Mirro	Van Diemen DP08	6	Retired

=== Formula F (FF) ===
Pos	No.	Driver	Car	Laps	Time/Gap
1	11	(Michigan) Nolan Allaer	Van Diemen RF00-Ford	15	30:23.216
2	08	(Florida) Jonathan Kotyk	Mygale SJ14-Honda	15	+0.051
3	73	(Indiana) Robert Perona	Piper DF3D-Honda	15	+15.549
4	88	(Illinois) Calvin Kautz	Piper DF3D-Honda	15	+21.469
5	2	(California) William Ferguson	Piper DL7-Honda	15	+33.323
6	27	(Michigan) Zachary Rivard	Van Diemen RF99-Honda	15	+47.948
7	14	(Texas) Matt Boian	Piper DF2C-Honda	15	+57.525
8	62	(Michigan) Robert Gross	Piper DL7-Honda	14	+1 Lap

=== Formula 600 (F600) ===
Pos	No.	Driver	Car	Laps	Time/Gap
1	07	(Michigan) Calvin Stewart	Novakar J10-Suzuki	15	33:13.917
2	78	(Illinois) Jason Martin	Novakar J10-Suzuki	15	+0.112
3	55	(New York (state)) Keith Joslyn	Scorpion S1-Rotax	15	+18.308
4	58	(North Carolina) H. Cory McLeod	Red Devil Aero-Rotax	15	+31.412
5	92	(Michigan) David Lapham	Novakar J10-Suzuki	15	+1:06.285
6	67	(Missouri) Jack Walbran	Scorpion S1-Suzuki	15	+1:26.131
7	15	(New York (state)) Robert Gray	Novakar J9-Suzuki	15	+1:26.507
8	22	(Indiana) James Weida	Scorpion S1-Rotax	13	+2 Laps
DNF	86	(Alabama) George Bugg	Novakar J10 Rakavon-Suzuki	6	Retired

=== Formula Vee (FV) ===
Pos	No.	Driver	Car	Laps	Time/Gap
1	12	(Wisconsin) Andrew Whitston	Protoform P3	13	37:21.127
2	79	(New Jersey) Alex Scaler	Scaler Mk1	13	+0.560
3	25	(Michigan) Andrew Abbott	Vector AM-1	13	+1.945
4	113	(Texas) Hunter Phelps-Barron	Mysterian M3	13	+3.709
5	67	(Maryland) Jonathan Weisheit	Protoform P3	13	+4.249
6	29	(New York (state)) Jeffrey Valeo	Mysterian M3	13	+4.974
7	72	(Vermont) Roger Siebenaler	Mysterian M3	13	+6.360
8	15	(Ohio) Brian Farnham	Silver Bullet FR-S	13	+7.789
9	26	(Michigan) Brandon Abbott	Vector AM-1	13	+9.173
10	7	(New York (state)) Trevor Carmody	Volkswagen Protoform	13	+9.553
11	80	(Georgia (U.S. state)) Stevan Davis	Vortech	13	+9.714
12	80	(Indiana) Chris Jennerjahn	Vortech	13	+11.295
13	74	(Michigan) Stuart Delaney	Caracal C	13	+11.904
14	37	(New Hampshire) Michael Hinkle	Protoform P3	13	+12.837
15	110	(Texas) Devin Boucher	Caracal D	13	+13.598
16	86	(Maryland) Ray Qualls	Protoform P3	13	+14.239
17	04	(Pennsylvania) Chase Johnson	Mysterian M3	13	+14.626
18	2	(South Carolina) Smith Jackson Ragsdale	Vortech	13	+15.502
19	27	(Texas) Zachary Whitston	Protoform P3	10	+3 Laps
DNF	18	(Texas) Steve Whitston	Protoform P3	5	Retired
DNF	52	(South Carolina) Mitchell Ferguson	Vortech FV	5	Retired
DNF	20	(Pennsylvania) Jeff Filipkowski	Vorscha GB5	2	Retired
DNF	30	(North Carolina) Donnie Isley	Vorscha	1	Retired
DNF	21	(Massachusetts) Gerard Owen Callaghan	Problem Child SM 01	0	Retired
DNF	77	(Pennsylvania) Rick Shields	VDF	0	Retired
DNF	5	(Wisconsin) Ron Whitston	Protoform P3	0	Retired
DNF	83	(South Carolina) William Duke Ragsdale	Vortech	0	Retired

=== Spec Miata (SM) ===
Pos	No.	Driver	Car	Laps	Time/Gap
1	42	(Florida) Preston Pardus	Mazda Miata	12	1:09:14.352
1	6	(Virginia) Nicholas Bruni	Mazda Miata	12	+0.000 (Note: Dead heat; both Pardus and Bruni are declared co-champions.)
3	97	(Virginia) Brian Henderson	Mazda Miata	12	+2.670
4	39	(Florida) Danny Steyn	Mazda Miata	12	+2.695
5	39	(Tennessee) Jim Drago	Mazda Miata	12	+3.225
6	198	(Virginia) Daniel Conway	Mazda Miata	12	+3.320
7	199	(Wisconsin) Ethan Jacobs	Mazda Miata	12	+3.346
8	193	(Georgia (U.S. state)) Raiden Nicol	Mazda Miata	12	+3.948
9	178	(Florida) Julian DaCosta	Mazda Miata	12	+5.503
10	56	(Florida) Todd Buras	Mazda Miata	12	+5.696
11	66	(South Carolina) Charles Mactutus	Mazda Miata	12	+5.782
12	118	(Florida) Jordan Rick Segrini	Mazda Miata	12	+9.819
13	15	(New Mexico) Brett Kowalski	Mazda Miata	12	+10.097
14	133	(California) Boris Said Jr.	Mazda Miata	12	+10.635
15	110	(Tennessee) Spencer Lofton	Mazda Miata	12	+11.097
16	9	(Texas) Logan Stretch	Mazda Miata	12	+11.191
17	44	(Massachusetts) Christian Sarnecki	Mazda Miata	12	+11.627
18	0	(New York (state)) Sean Noonan	Mazda Miata	12	+11.688
19	155	(Wisconsin) Cam Ebben	Mazda Miata	12	+13.139
20	194	(Massachusetts) Nick Leverone	Mazda Miata	12	+13.365
21	99	(Florida) Noah Harmon	Mazda Miata	12	+14.189
22	16	(Ohio) Jonathan Davis	Mazda Miata	12	+14.717
23	48	(Florida) Frankie Barroso	Mazda Miata	12	+16.531
24	18	(South Carolina) Joseph Tobin	Mazda Miata	12	+25.282
25	34	(South Carolina) Ford Munnerlyn	Mazda Miata	12	+25.443
26	21	(North Carolina) Eric Gerchak	Mazda Miata	12	+25.674
27	95	(Arizona) Jonathan Neudorf	Mazda Miata	12	+26.113
28	73	(Connecticut) Ethan Goulart	Mazda Miata	12	+26.968
29	46	(New York (state)) Domenico Leuci	Mazda Miata	12	+28.269
30	169	(New York (state)) Matthew Sisson	Mazda Miata	12	+32.293
31	192	(Florida) Jesse Singer	Mazda Miata	12	+40.237
32	13	(Florida) Alfredo Zedan	Mazda Miata	12	+41.051
33	84	(South Carolina) Bobby Gossett	Mazda Miata	12	+41.948
34	8	(Kentucky) Patrick McGovern	Mazda Miata	12	+43.810
35	98	(Pennsylvania) Charlie Campbell	Mazda Miata	12	+50.635
36	74	(Florida) Rob Bailey	Mazda Miata	12	+51.099
37	28	(Virginia) David Henderson	Mazda Miata	12	+51.620
38	17	(Washington (state)) Whitfield Gregg	Mazda Miata	12	+52.309
39	195	(New York (state)) John Jenkins	Mazda Miata	12	+1:08.039
40	108	(Minnesota) Andrea King	Mazda Miata	12	+1:34.830
41	12	(Minnesota) Russell King	Mazda Miata	11	+1 Lap
42	76	(North Carolina) Laurin Brallier	Mazda Miata	10	+2 Laps
43	78	(Virginia) Theodore Cahall	Mazda Miata	8	+4 Laps
DNF	70	(Connecticut) Elivan Goulart	Mazda Miata	4	Retired
DNF	100	(New York (state)) Douglas Ahn	Mazda Miata	3	Retired
DNF	14	(Washington (state)) Amy Mills	Mazda Miata	1	Retired
DNF	4	(Virginia) Rob Hines	Mazda Miata	0	Retired
DNF	69	(Maryland) Jeremy Butz	Mazda Miata	0	Retired
DNF	109	(Florida) Chris Clarke	Mazda Miata	0	Retired
DNF	159	(North Carolina) Bailey Sigler	Mazda Miata	0	Retired
DNS	08	(New York (state)) Anthony Geraci	Mazda Miata	0	Did not start
DNS	5	(Texas) Marc Briley	Mazda Miata	0	Did not start

=== Prototype 1 (P1) ===
Pos	No.	Driver	Car	Laps	Time/Gap
1	19	(Florida) Todd Vanacore	Élan DP02-Mazda	15	+9.106
2	23	(California) Jim Devenport	Élan DP02-Mazda	15	30:33.367 (Note: One-place position penalty.)
3	3	(Wisconsin) Jason Miller	Wynnfurst WF1-Kohler	15	+34.770
4	21	(Massachusetts) Todd Parks	Stohr WF1-Suzuki	15	+47.402
5	22	(California) John Manfroy	Stohr WF1-Suzuki	15	+1:27.617
6	29	(Arizona) Chip Romer	Élan DP02-Mazda	13	+2 Laps
7	88	(Georgia (U.S. state)) John Mcaleer	Élan DP02-Mazda	11	+4 Laps
8	48	(Tennessee) Lee Alexander	Stohr WF-Z-Kawasaki	8	+7 Laps
DNF	9	(Illinois) Greg Case	Stohr WF1-Suzuki	3	Retired
DNS	82	(Massachusetts) Matthew Gendron	Downing Atlanta Peach-Mazda		Did not start

=== Prototype 2 (P2) ===
Pos	No.	Driver	Car	Laps	Time/Gap
1	99	(Texas) Lucian Pancea	Stohr WF1-Kawasaki	15	27:40.802
2	8	(Arizona) Tim Day Jr.	Stohr WF1-Suzuki	15	+0.063
3	83	(Illinois) Greg Gyann	Stohr WF1-Suzuki	15	+2.847
4	44	(North Carolina) Tony Ave	Stohr WF1-Suzuki	15	+20.549
5	03	(Florida) Sherman Chao	Stohr WF1-Suzuki	15	+21.553
6	28	(Wisconsin) Bart Wolf	Ligier JS49-Honda	15	+25.549
7	07	(Florida) Thomas Kaufman	Stohr 01D-Suzuki	15	+1:09.392
8	89	(North Carolina) A. J. Snyder	Stohr WF1-Suzuki	15	+1:40.883
9	7	(Wisconsin) Mike Reupert	Stohr WF1-Suzuki	8	+7 Laps
10	97	(Illinois) Richard Colburn	Nostendo 1-Suzuki	7	+8 Laps
DNF	77	(North Carolina) Michael Moulton	Stohr WF1	6	Retired
DNS	12	(Florida) Peter Shadowen	West WX10-Suzuki		Did not start

=== Spec Racer Ford Gen 3 (SRF3) ===
Pos	No.	Driver	Car	Laps	Time/Gap
1	97	(Georgia (U.S. state)) Franklin Futrelle	SCCA Spec Racer Ford Gen 3	15	31:23.702
2	108	(Texas) David Ogburn	SCCA Spec Racer Ford Gen 3	15	+0.359
3	99	(Oregon) Caleb Shrader	SCCA Spec Racer Ford Gen 3	15	+14.805
4	7	(Michigan) Justin Claucherty	SCCA Spec Racer Ford Gen 3	15	+24.160
5	106	(Illinois) Jase Petty	SCCA Spec Racer Ford Gen 3	15	+29.039
6	11	(South Carolina) Robeson Clay Russell	SCCA Spec Racer Ford Gen 3	15	+29.126
7	9	(Florida) Todd Vanacore	SCCA Spec Racer Ford Gen 3	15	+29.322
8	55	(Maryland) Sam Schechter	SCCA Spec Racer Ford Gen 3	15	+40.867
9	00	(Texas) Scott Monroe	SCCA Spec Racer Ford Gen 3	15	+42.490
10	123	(Texas) Sal Webber	SCCA Spec Racer Ford Gen 3	15	+44.532
11	68	(Florida) James Goughary	SCCA Spec Racer Ford Gen 3	15	+48.383
12	48	(Indiana) Chris Jennerjahn	SCCA Spec Racer Ford Gen 3	15	+49.131
13	64	(Minnesota) Matt Gray	SCCA Spec Racer Ford Gen 3	15	+51.747
14	27	(Virginia) Brian Cates	SCCA Spec Racer Ford Gen 3	15	+52.381
15	101	(Massachusetts) William Hendrix	SCCA Spec Racer Ford Gen 3	15	+52.504
16	45	(Washington (state)) Tom Burt	SCCA Spec Racer Ford Gen 3	15	+53.418
17	77	(Oregon) Andre Perra	SCCA Spec Racer Ford Gen 3	15	+57.830
18	12	(Minnesota) Russell King	SCCA Spec Racer Ford Gen 3	15	+1:03.059
19	6	(Connecticut) Gianclaudio Angelini	SCCA Spec Racer Ford Gen 3	15	+1:03.060
20	42	(Connecticut) Craig Chase	SCCA Spec Racer Ford Gen 3	15	+1:04.600
21	72	(North Carolina) Lee Hill	SCCA Spec Racer Ford Gen 3	15	+1:12.110
22	171	(Wisconsin) Ben Jacobs	SCCA Spec Racer Ford Gen 3	15	+1:21.653
23	79	(Illinois) Steven Greenhill	SCCA Spec Racer Ford Gen 3	15	+1:21.811
24	31	(Illinois) Jeff Beck	SCCA Spec Racer Ford Gen 3	15	+1:22.351
25	65	(Tennessee) Scott Ross	SCCA Spec Racer Ford Gen 3	15	+1:35.887
26	147	(New York (state)) Steven Spano	SCCA Spec Racer Ford Gen 3	15	+1:38.828
27	21	(North Carolina) Charlie Rogers	SCCA Spec Racer Ford Gen 3	15	+1:42.975
28	94	(South Carolina) Jeff Futrelle	SCCA Spec Racer Ford Gen 3	15	+1:43.207
29	3	(Maryland) Keith Fraser	SCCA Spec Racer Ford Gen 3	15	+1:50.105
30	98	(Florida) Craig Wheatley	SCCA Spec Racer Ford Gen 3	15	+1:59.140
31	30	(Washington, D.C.) Mac Harrison	SCCA Spec Racer Ford Gen 3	14	+1 Lap
32	47	(Connecticut) Kenneth Reilly	SCCA Spec Racer Ford Gen 3	14	+1 Lap
33	08	(Minnesota) Andrea King	SCCA Spec Racer Ford Gen 3	14	+1 Lap
34	02	(West Virginia) Morgan Burkhard	SCCA Spec Racer Ford Gen 3	11	+4 Lap
35	4	(Texas) Denny Stripling	SCCA Spec Racer Ford Gen 3	9	+6 Lap
36	23	(Virginia) Charles Russell Turner	SCCA Spec Racer Ford Gen 3	15	0 Lap (Note: Demotion to last place penalty.)
DNF	19	(Michigan) Bobby Sak	SCCA Spec Racer Ford Gen 3	4	Retired
DNF	17	(California) John Black	SCCA Spec Racer Ford Gen 3	3	Retired
DNF	07	(Florida) S. Sandy Satullo III	SCCA Spec Racer Ford Gen 3	1	Retired
DNF	61	(Florida) Brian Schofield	SCCA Spec Racer Ford Gen 3	0	Retired

=== American Sedan (AS) ===
Pos	No.	Driver	Car	Laps	Time/Gap
1	22	(Maryland) Daniel Richardson	Chevrolet Camaro	15	31:25.221
2	78	(Michigan) Clark Cambern	Dodge Challenger	15	+23.566
3	51	(Pennsylvania) Amy Aquilante	Pontiac Firebird	15	+44.388
4	56	(Maine) Thomas West	Cadillac CTS-V	15	+1:01.788
5	58	(New Jersey) Beth Aquilante	Pontiac Firebird	15	+1:44.473
6	5	(Michigan) Kyle Jones	Pontiac Firebird	15	+2:10.743
7	11	(Texas) Sam Daniels	Chevrolet Camaro	14	+1 Lap
8	3	(Connecticut) Kelly Lubash	Chevrolet Camaro	13	+2 Laps
DNF	21	(Virginia) Gregory Eaton	Ford Mustang	2	Retired
DNF	14	(Pennsylvania) James Jost	Ford Mustang GT	0	Retired
DNF	24	(Michigan) Andrew McDermid	Ford Mustang	0	Retired

=== Spec MX-5 Challenge ===
==== Race 1 ====
Pos	No.	Driver	Car	Laps	Time/Gap	Grid
1	95	(Indiana) Nathan Nicholson	Mazda MX-5 Spec	7	33:46.990	1
2	54	(Indiana) Chase Jones	Mazda MX-5 Spec	7	+0.321	4
3	4	(Illinois) Alex Bertagnoli	Mazda MX-5 Spec	7	+1.742	2
4	115	(Florida) Noah Harmon	Mazda MX-5 Spec	7	+2.421	3
5	77	(Wisconsin) Nico Bratz	Mazda MX-5 Spec	7	+2.755	5
6	113	(North Carolina) Westin Workman	Mazda MX-5 Spec	7	+3.916	6
7	86	(Georgia (U.S. state)) Jarrett Jones	Mazda MX-5 Spec	7	+5.558	8
8	9	(Missouri) Reid Sweeney	Mazda MX-5 Spec	7	+6.826	7
9	8	(Ohio) Austin Hill	Mazda MX-5 Spec	7	+7.375	9
10	75	(Georgia (U.S. state)) Donald Squirek	Mazda MX-5 Spec	7	+8.350	18
11	55	(Wisconsin) Cam Ebben	Mazda MX-5 Spec	7	+10.416	12
12	199	(Wisconsin) Ethan Jacobs	Mazda MX-5 Spec	7	+11.664	15
13	195	(Florida) Rocco Pasquarella	Mazda MX-5 Spec	7	+12.514	14
14	87	(Washington (state)) Adam Gonzalez	Mazda MX-5 Spec	7	+14.488	17
15	79	(New York (state)) Spencer Bogar	Mazda MX-5 Spec	7	+15.103	16
16	5	(California) Adrian Comstock	Mazda MX-5 Spec	7	+15.726	13
DNF	22	(South Carolina) Will Robusto	Mazda MX-5 Spec	0	Accident	10
DNF	16	(Rhode Island) Nathan Saxon	Mazda MX-5 Spec	0	Accident	11

Note: Racing incident in the first lap resulted in full course caution for the entire duration of the race, and the results for points awarding were reverted to the qualifying order for the finishers.

==== Race 2 ====
Pos	No.	Driver	Car	Laps	Time/Gap
1	113	(North Carolina) Westin Workman	Mazda MX-5 Spec	15	33:21.911
2	4	(Illinois) Alex Bertagnoli	Mazda MX-5 Spec	15	+1.097
3	55	(Wisconsin) Cam Ebben	Mazda MX-5 Spec	15	+8.458
4	75	(Georgia (U.S. state)) Donald Squirek	Mazda MX-5 Spec	15	+11.400
5	99	(Florida) Noah Harmon	Mazda MX-5 Spec	15	+1.193
6	9	(Missouri) Reid Sweeney	Mazda MX-5 Spec	15	+14.521
7	8	(Ohio) Austin Hill	Mazda MX-5 Spec	15	+15.292
8	95	(Indiana) Nathan Nicholson	Mazda MX-5 Spec	15	+15.436
9	54	(Indiana) Chase Jones	Mazda MX-5 Spec	15	+15.531
10	199	(Wisconsin) Ethan Jacobs	Mazda MX-5 Spec	15	+19.219
11	195	(Florida) Rocco Pasquarella	Mazda MX-5 Spec	15	+26.319
12	5	(California) Adrian Comstock	Mazda MX-5 Spec	15	+54.971
13	87	(Washington (state)) Adam Gonzalez	Mazda MX-5 Spec	15	+55.138
14	79	(New York (state)) Spencer Bogar	Mazda MX-5 Spec	15	+58.283
DNF	86	(Georgia (U.S. state)) Jarrett Jones	Mazda MX-5 Spec	9	Retired
DNF	77	(Wisconsin) Nico Bratz	Mazda MX-5 Spec	7	Retired
DNS	22	(South Carolina) Will Robusto	Mazda MX-5 Spec		Did not start
DNS	16	(Rhode Island) Nathan Saxon	Mazda MX-5 Spec		Did not start

==== Championship standings ====
Points system

Position	1	2	3	4	5	6	7	8	9	10	11	12	13	14	15	16	17	18	19	20
Carryover	10	9	8	7	6	5	4	3	2	1	—N/a									
Race	50	42	36	34	32	30	28	26	24	22	20	18	16	14	12	10	8	6	4	2

- Top 10 in the regular season started with carryover points based on their position in the standings.
- Drivers who started but did not finish (DNF) will receive points for 1 position behind the last finisher.
- Drivers who qualified but did not start (DNS) will receive points for 2 positions behind the last finisher.

Spec MX-5 National Championship

Pos.	No.	Driver	C/O	R1 (Note: Finishing order based on qualifying.)	R2	Points
1	4	(Illinois) Alex Bertagnoli	5	2	2	90
2	113	(North Carolina) Westin Workman	2	6	1	89
3	95	(Indiana) Nathan Nicholson	1	1	8	86
4	115	(Florida) Noah Harmon	4	3	4	75
5	55	(Wisconsin) Cam Ebben	7	10	3	62
6	54	(Indiana) Chase Jones	10	4	9	59
7	9	(Missouri) Reid Sweeney		7	6	58
8	8	(Ohio) Austin Hill		9	7	52
9	75	(Georgia (U.S. state)) Donald Squirek	8	16	4	47
10	77	(Wisconsin) Nico Bratz	9	5	Ret	46
11	86	(Georgia (U.S. state)) Jarrett Jones		8	Ret	38
12	199	(Wisconsin) Ethan Jacobs		13	10	38
13	195	(Florida) Rocco Pasquarella		12	11	38
14	5	(California) Adrian Comstock		11	12	38
15	87	(Washington (state)) Adam Gonzalez		15	13	28
16	79	(New York (state)) Spencer Bogar		14	14	28
17	16	(Rhode Island) Nathan Saxon	3	Ret	DNS	26
18	22	(South Carolina) Will Robusto	6	Ret	DNS	23
