= Jared Odrick =

American football player (born 1987)

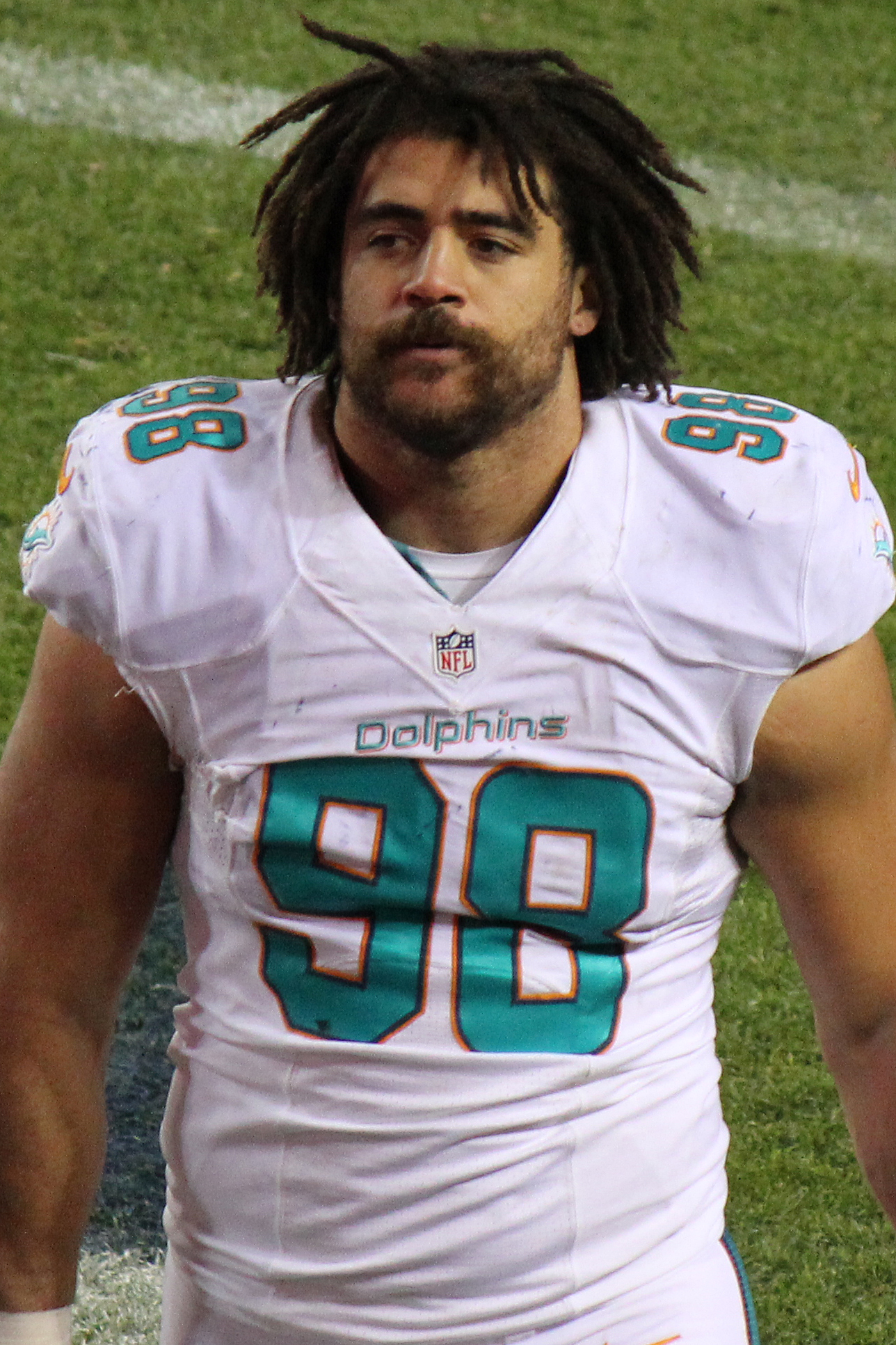
- Odrick with the Miami Dolphins in 2014

No. 98, 75
- Position: Defensive end

Personal information
- Born: December 31, 1987 (age 38); Lancaster, Pennsylvania, U.S.
- Listed height: 6 ft 5 in (1.96 m)
- Listed weight: 298 lb (135 kg)

Career information
- High school: Lebanon (Lebanon, Pennsylvania)
- College: Penn State (2006–2009)
- NFL draft: 2010: 1st round, 28th overall pick

Career history
- Miami Dolphins (2010–2014); Jacksonville Jaguars (2015–2016)

Awards and highlights
- First-team All-American (2009); Big Ten Co-Defensive Player of the Year (2009); Big Ten Defensive Lineman of the Year (2009); 2× First-team All-Big Ten (2008, 2009)

Career NFL statistics
- Total tackles: 170
- Sacks: 23
- Forced fumbles: 5
- Fumble recoveries: 1
- Pass deflections: 15
- Interceptions: 1
- Stats at Pro Football Reference

Other information
Jared Odrick
- Achievements: 2025 Trans-Am Series TA2 Pro-Am Champion; 2023 SCCA GT-2 Champion
NASCAR Canada Series career
- 3 races run over 1 year
- Car no., team: No. 24 (BC Race Cars)
- 2026 position: 38th
- Best finish: 38th (2026)
- First race: 2026 Le Tours 45 CarGurus (Trois-Rivières)
- Last race: 2026 NAPA 100 (ICAR)
Wins	Top tens	Poles
0	0	0
- Statistics up to date as of September 13, 2026.

Jared Taylor Odrick (born December 31, 1987) is an American professional auto racing driver, writer, actor, and former professional football player. He currently competes part-time in the NASCAR Canada Series, driving the No. 24 Ford for BC Race Cars and full-time in the Trans-Am Series in the TA2 Pro-Am class, driving the No. 00 for TRB Autosport. Odrick is most widely known for his time as a defensive end in the National Football League (NFL) where he was selected by the Miami Dolphins in the first round of the 2010 NFL draft. He played college football for the Penn State Nittany Lions and also played for the Jacksonville Jaguars later in his professional career.

Odrick is now a professional actor in movies such as Roller Coaster (2015), Filling (2016) and more recently opposite Sylvester Stallone in Samaritan (2022).

== Early life ==
Odrick was a 2005 USAToday, Parade Magazine, and U.S. Army All-American as a senior at Lebanon High School in Lebanon, Pennsylvania. He was named first-team all-state and played in the 2006 Big 33 Football Classic and the 2006 U.S. Army All-American Bowl.

== College career ==
Odrick played sparingly his freshman season at Penn State University, but earned the starting job at defensive tackle in 2007. He would make 16 tackles, with four tackles-for-loss, two sacks, and one blocked kick. In 2008, Odrick started 11 games, earning First-team All-Big Ten honors. He recorded 41 tackles, with 9.5 tackles-for-loss, 4.5 sacks, one forced fumble, and three pass breakups.

Odrick was named an AFCA and CBSSports.com All-American in 2009. He was also named the Big Ten Defensive Player of the Year, the Big Ten Defensive Lineman of the Year, and First-team All-Big Ten by the conference's coaches, He is ranked No. 8 in the Big Ten with 6.0 sacks and was fifth on the team with 41 tackles, has 10.0 tackles for loss, with one blocked field goal, one pass break-up and three quarterback hurries.

== Professional career ==
Pre-draft measurables
Height	Weight	Arm length	Hand span	40-yard dash	10-yard split	20-yard split	20-yard shuttle	Three-cone drill	Vertical jump	Broad jump	Bench press
6 ft 5 in (1.96 m)	304 lb (138 kg)	34 in (0.86 m)	9 3/4 in (0.25 m)	4.95 s	1.77 s	2.92 s	4.44 s	7.22 s	29.0 in (0.74 m)	8 ft 10 in (2.69 m)	26 reps
All values from NFL Combine/Pro Day

=== Miami Dolphins ===
Odrick was selected by the Miami Dolphins in the first round with the 28th overall pick of the 2010 NFL draft. He signed a five-year, $13 million contract (with $7.1 million guaranteed) with the Dolphins on July 29, 2010. He is represented by Drew Rosenhaus. In October 2010, Jared broke his foot in practice and missed the rest of the season.

In 2011, Odrick had a strong season having an interception and six sacks as a backup defensive end. Odrick became infamous during that season for performing the "Pee-Wee Herman Dance" after recording a sack, reenacting a scene from Pee-Wee's Big Adventure.

=== Jacksonville Jaguars ===
Odrick was signed by the Jacksonville Jaguars on March 11, 2015.

Odrick was placed on injured reserve on December 10, 2016, with a shoulder injury.

On February 20, 2017, Odrick was released by the Jaguars.

=== NFL statistics ===
Year	Team	GP	COMB	TOTAL	AST	SACK	FF	FR	FR YDS	INT	IR YDS	AVG IR	LNG	TD	PD
2010	MIA	1	1	1	0	0.0	0	0	0	0	0	0	0	0	0
2011	MIA	16	22	20	2	6.0	1	0	0	1	39	39	39	0	2
2012	MIA	16	35	26	9	5.0	0	0	0	0	0	0	0	0	2
2013	MIA	16	42	33	9	4.5	1	0	0	0	0	0	0	0	2
2014	MIA	16	29	23	6	1.0	1	1	0	0	0	0	0	0	5
2015	JAX	16	29	23	6	5.5	1	0	0	0	0	0	0	0	3
2016	JAX	6	12	9	3	1.0	1	0	0	0	0	0	0	0	1
Career		87	170	135	35	22.5	5	1	0	1	39	39	39	0	15

== Arts and entertainment ==
=== Writing ===
Odrick has written many articles for a variety of sports publications, including "Football, the flag, and the right to speak our minds," for Sports Illustrated, "Who do you cheer for?", for Sporting News, and most recently "Kneeling to Nike", a critical response to Kaepernick and Nike.

=== TV and film ===
In 2015, Odrick made his debut on HBO's Ballers, written by Stephen Levinson and starring Dwayne Johnson. He appeared in four episodes between 2015 and 2016.

Odrick is the executive producer of three short films: "Roller Coaster" (2015), "Filling in" (2016), and "Jade" (2017). He acted in both "Filling in" and "Jade," playing the role of Kevin in the former, and Justin in the latter. He made an appearance in Sylvester Stallone's thriller film, Samaritan, which was released in 2022.

=== Visual arts ===
In 2017, Odrick curated an art exhibit in the city of Jacksonville, taking over ten select billboards and juxtaposing local artists' work against commercial advertisements. The contrast between the art and advertisement emphasized "how much we've allowed commercialism to hoard our public viewing space". The project was a collaborative effort with University of North Florida art student, Jenna Sparrow, and the Jaguar's Director of Photography, Everett Sullivan.

== Racing career ==
=== Early career ===
In 2021, Odrick was invited by a family friend to see him race in a Mazda Miata, where he caught the racing bug. The following year he bought a Porsche 991.1 and obtained his racing permit in March.

Odrick began racing in the Sports Car Club of America GT2 class in 2022. He finished 16th at the Runoffs. On September 29, 2023, Odrick won the SCCA National Championship Runoffs GT2 at Virginia International Raceway in Alton, Virginia in a Porsche 991.2 GT3 Cup.

=== Trans-Am ===
In 2024, Odrick took on a full-time drive in the Trans-Am Series TA2 Pro-Am class with CB Motorsports. After five races, he moved to Nitro Motorsports for the remainder of the season. Odrick finished fourth in the final standings. For 2025, he moved to TRB Autosport in a Chevrolet Camaro. After taking victory at the final race in Circuit of the Americas, Odrick claimed the TA2 Pro-Am championship by six points over Keith Prociuk.

== Racing record ==
=== Racing career summary ===
Season	Series	Team	Races	Wins	Poles	F/Laps	Podiums	Points	Position
2022	SCCA National Championship Runoffs - GT2		1	0	0	0	0	N/A	16th
2023	SCCA National Championship Runoffs - GT2		1	1	0	1	1	N/A	1st
2024	SCCA National Championship Runoffs - GT2		1	0	0	0	1	N/A	2nd
2024	Trans-Am Series - TA2 Pro-Am	CB Motosports; Nitro Motorsports	12	1	0	1	5	765	4th
2024	Sports Car Championship Canada - GT4	VPX Motorsport	4	0	0	1	3	0	NC†
2025	Trans-Am Series - TA2 Pro-Am	TRB Autosport	12	4	2	2	9	916	1st
2026	Trans-Am Series - TA2 Pro-Am	TRB Autosport	6	4	2	2	4	*	*
2026	Toyota GR Cup North America	Dream Machine @ Eagles Canyon	2	0	0	0	0	*	*
2026	NASCAR Canada Series	BC Race Cars Inc.	3	0	0	0	0	73	38th

* Season still in progress
† Guest driver ineligible to score points
