= Mini Cooper =

Mini Cooper may refer to:

- Performance Cars of the original Mini series with updated drivetrain and brakes, called the "Mini Cooper", made by the British Motor Corporation and also the successors 1961–1971, and 1990–2000
- Cars of the Mini (marque), including several different models produced by BMW since 2000 with the "Mini Cooper" title:
  - Mini Hatch, introduced in early 2000, second generation from 2006, third generation from 2014, and fourth generation from 2024, changing the model name to MINI Cooper.
  - Mini Clubman (2007–2024)
  - Mini Countryman
  - Mini Coupé (2011–2015) and Roadster (2012–2015)
  - Mini Paceman (2012–2016)
  - Mini Aceman
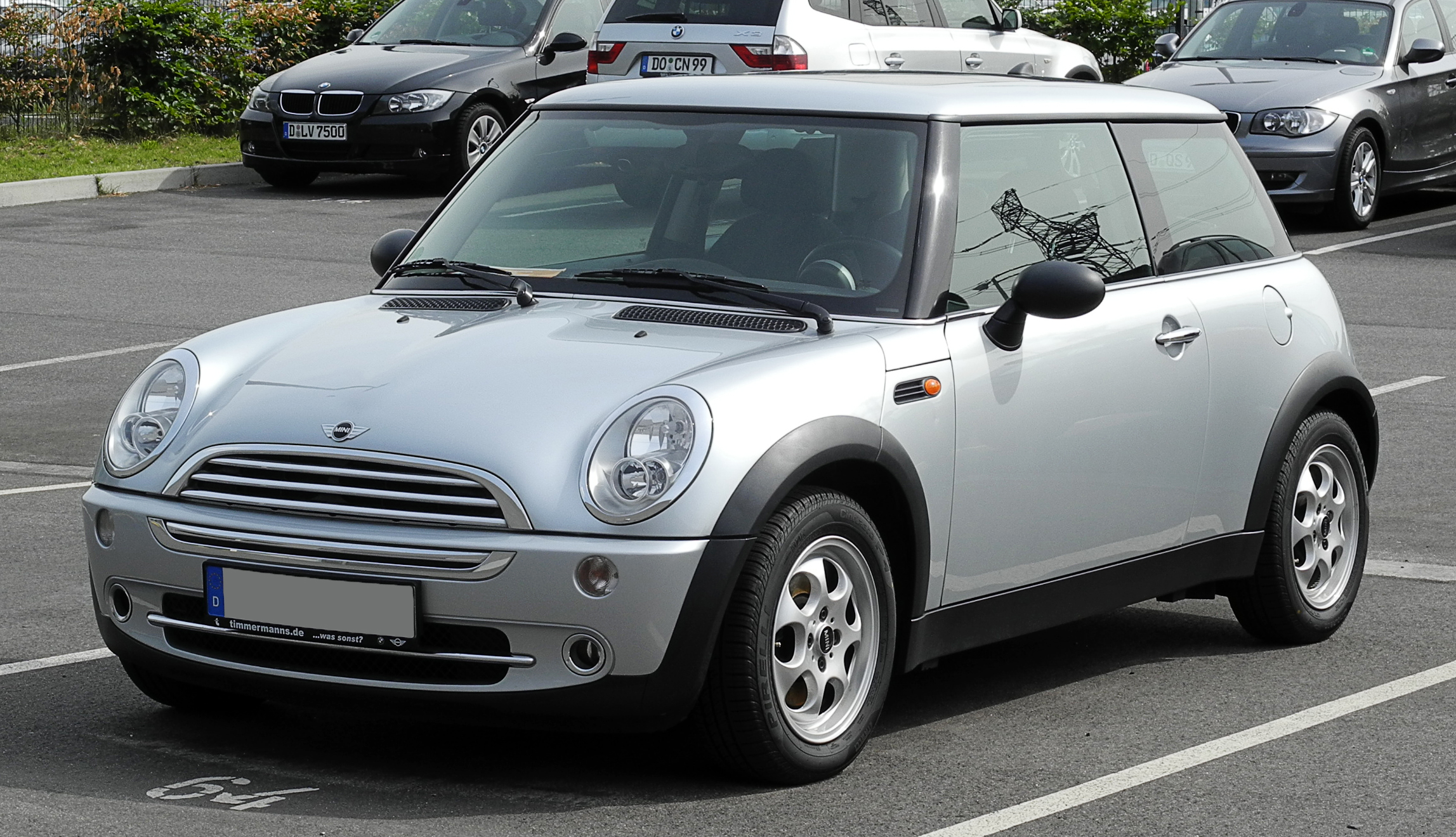
Mini Hatch (R50/53)

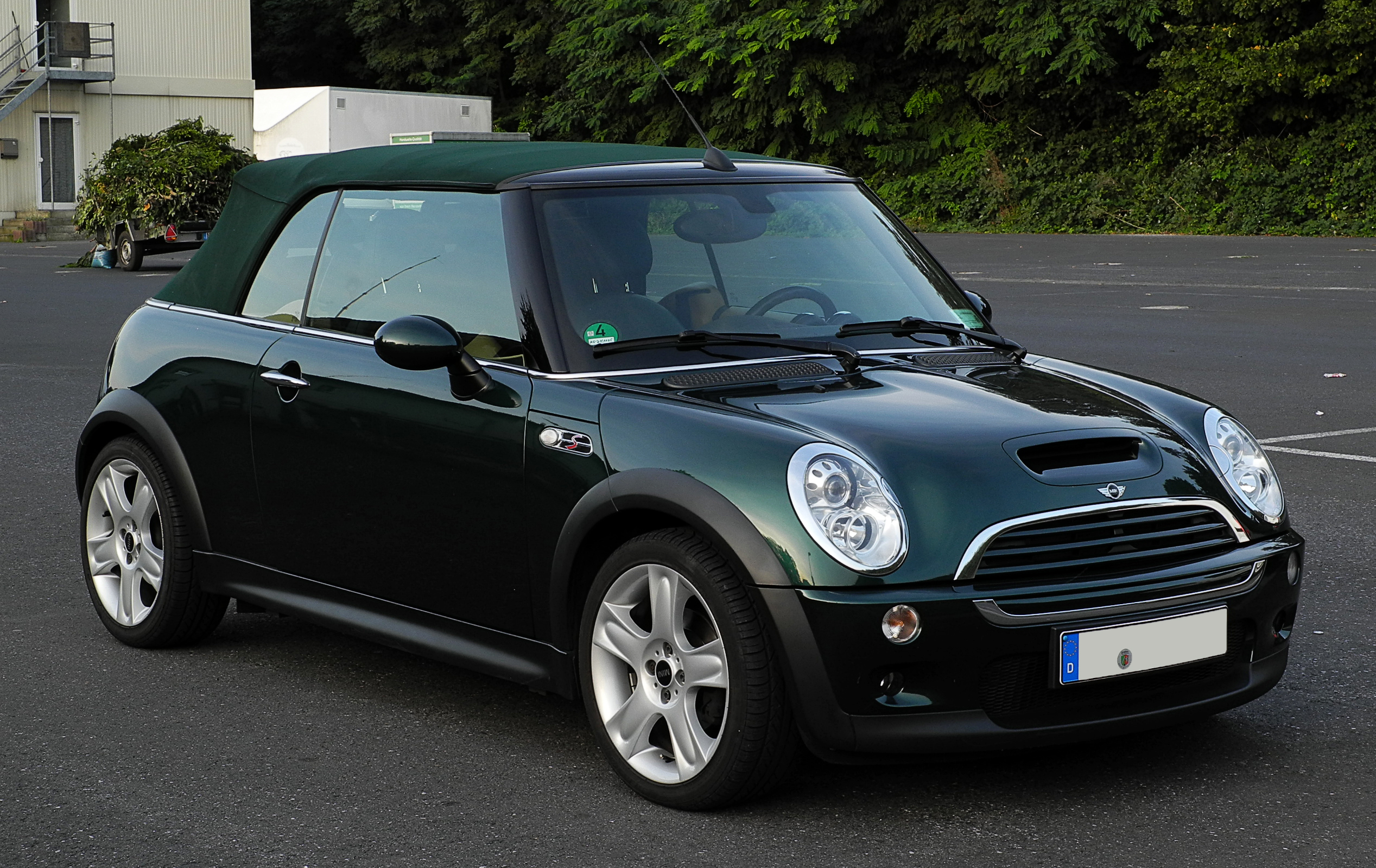
Mini Convertible (R52)

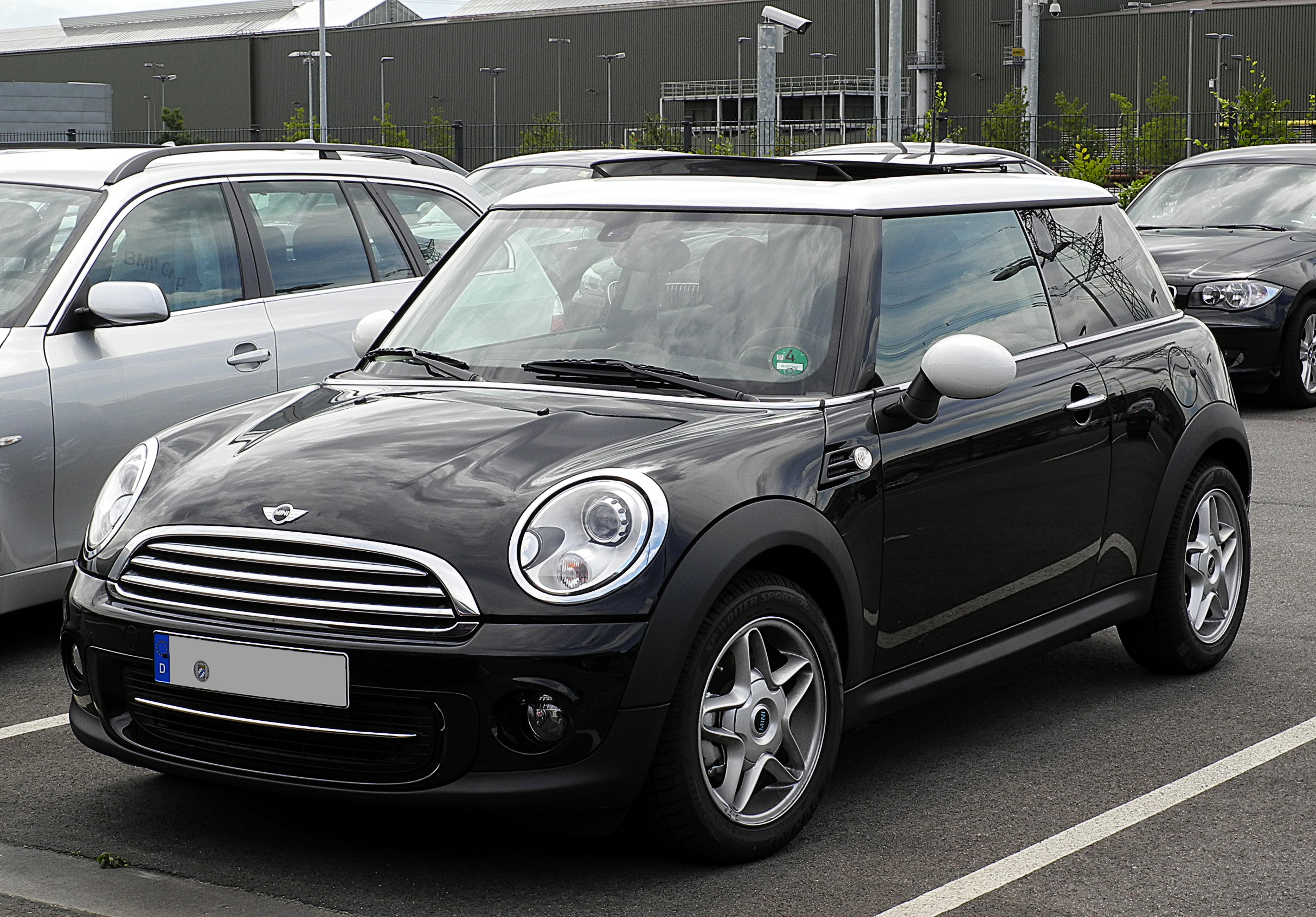
Mini Hatch (R56)

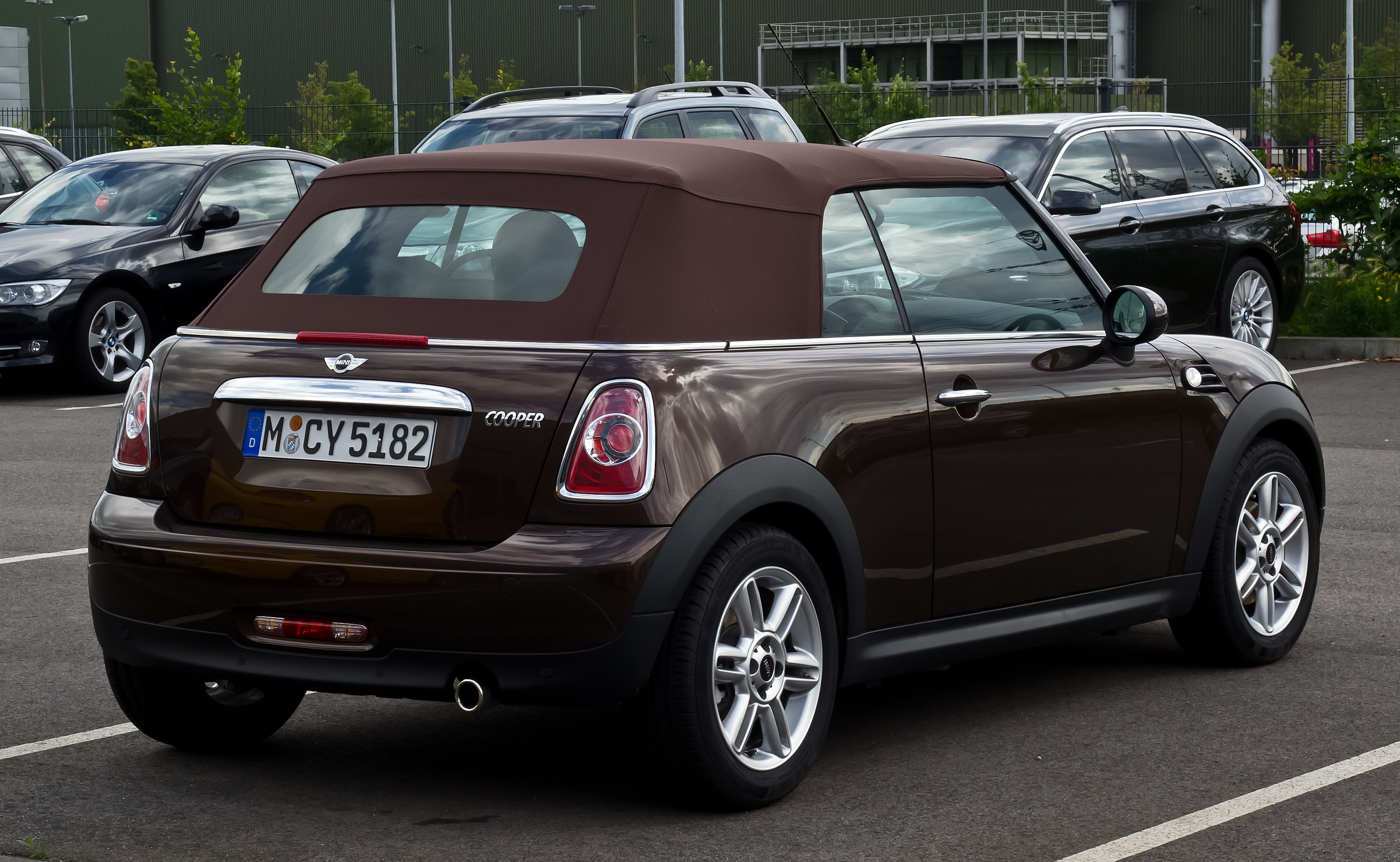
Mini Convertible (R57)

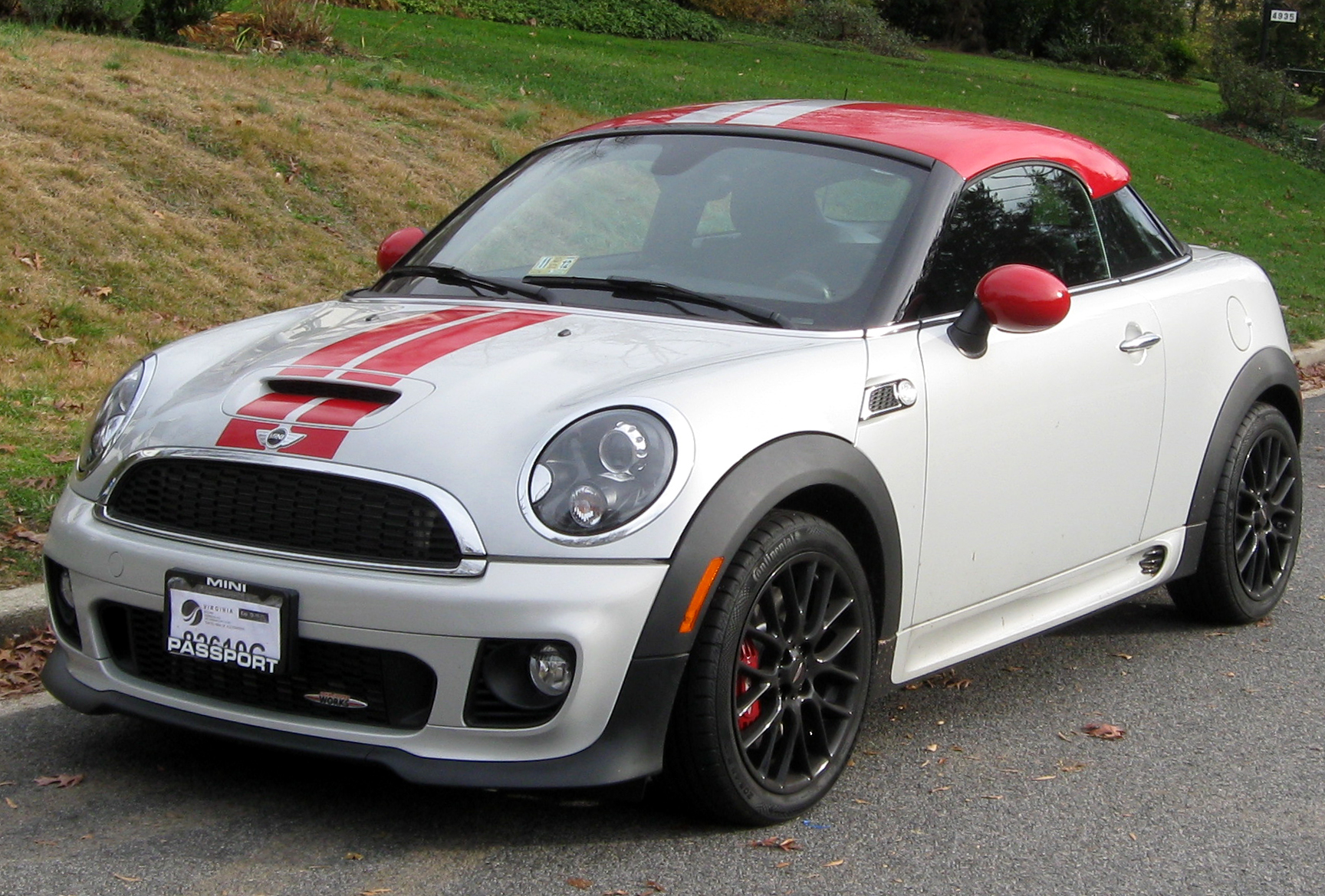
Mini Coupé (R58) and Roadster (R59)

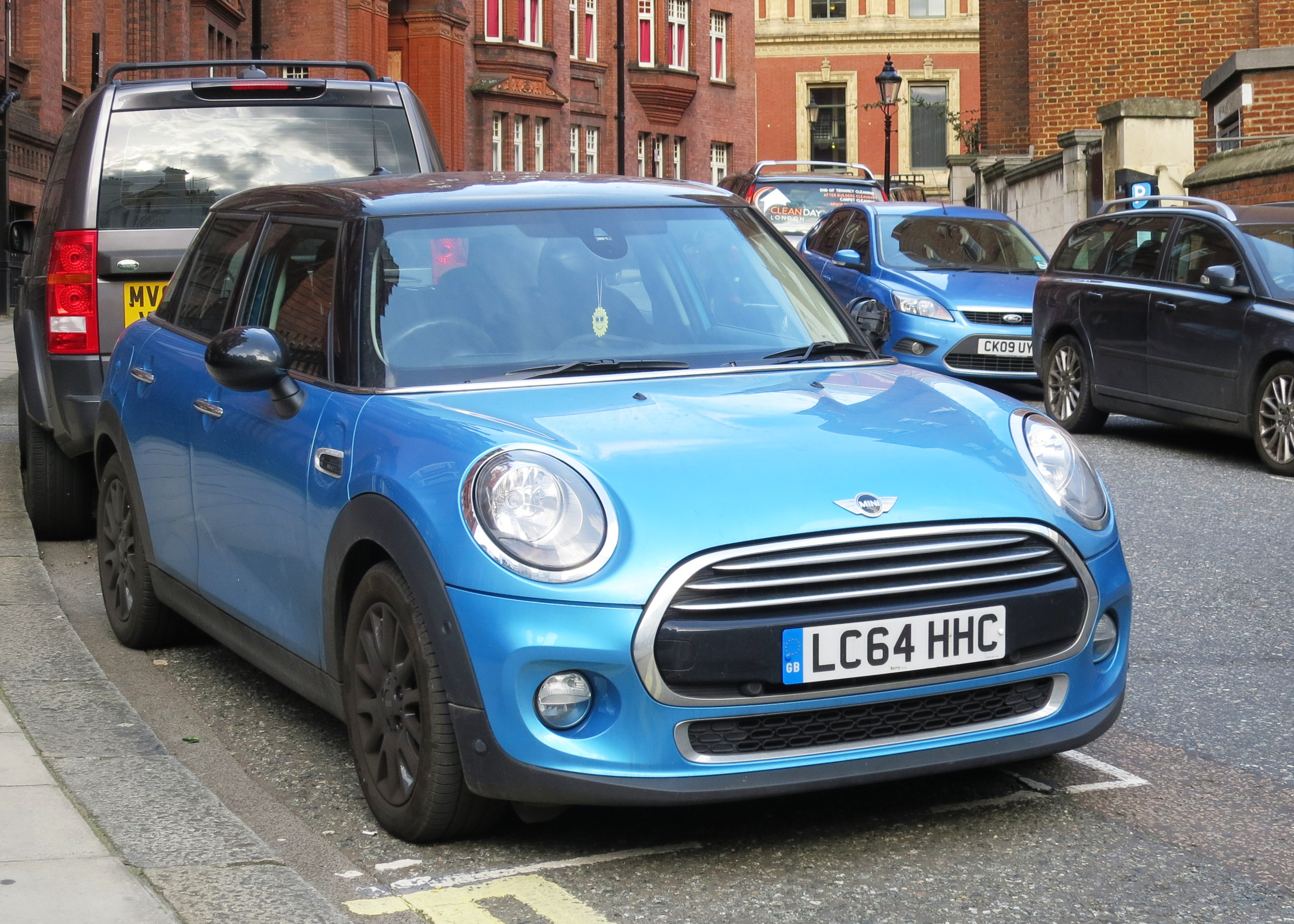
Mini Hatch (F55)

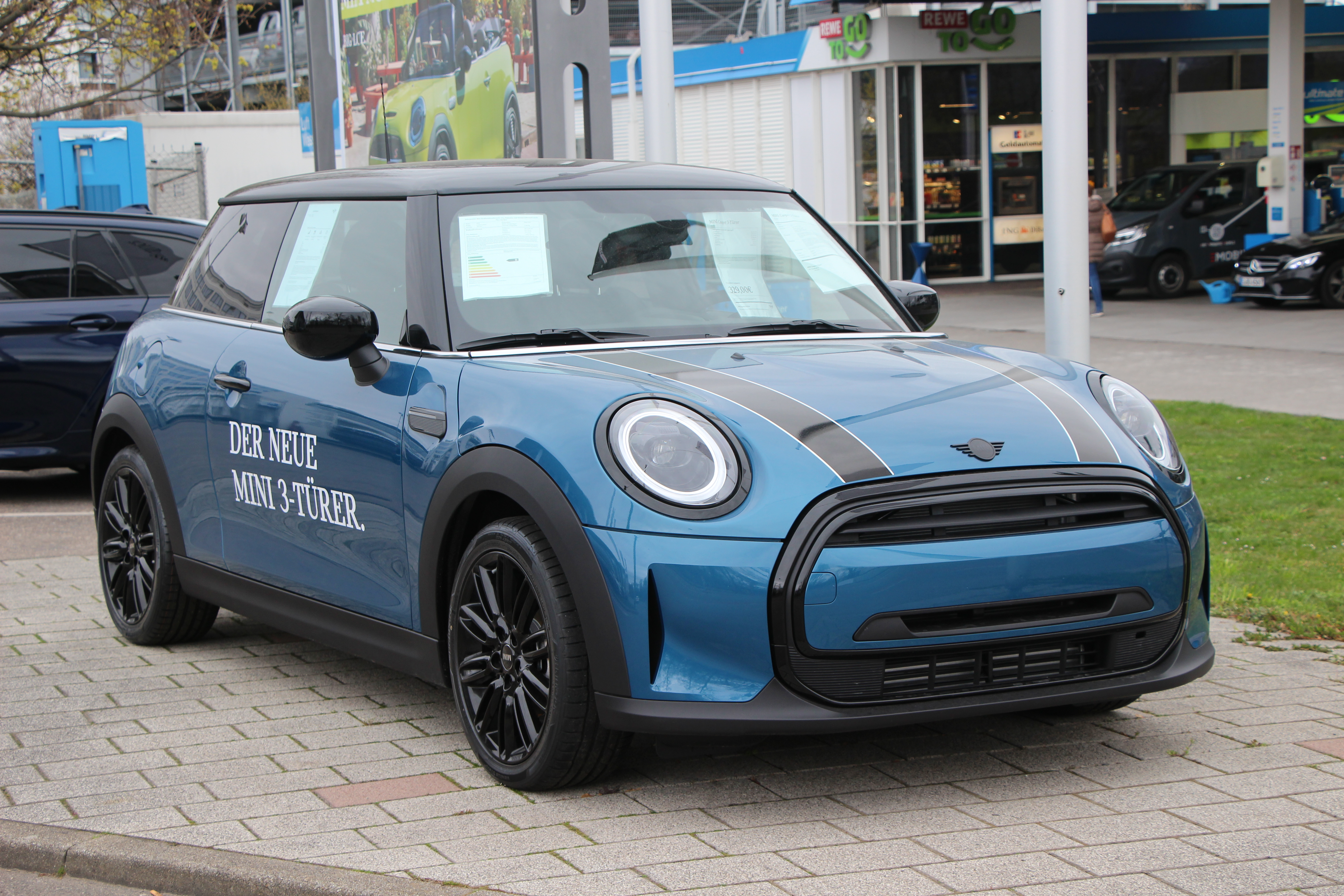
Mini Hatch (F56)

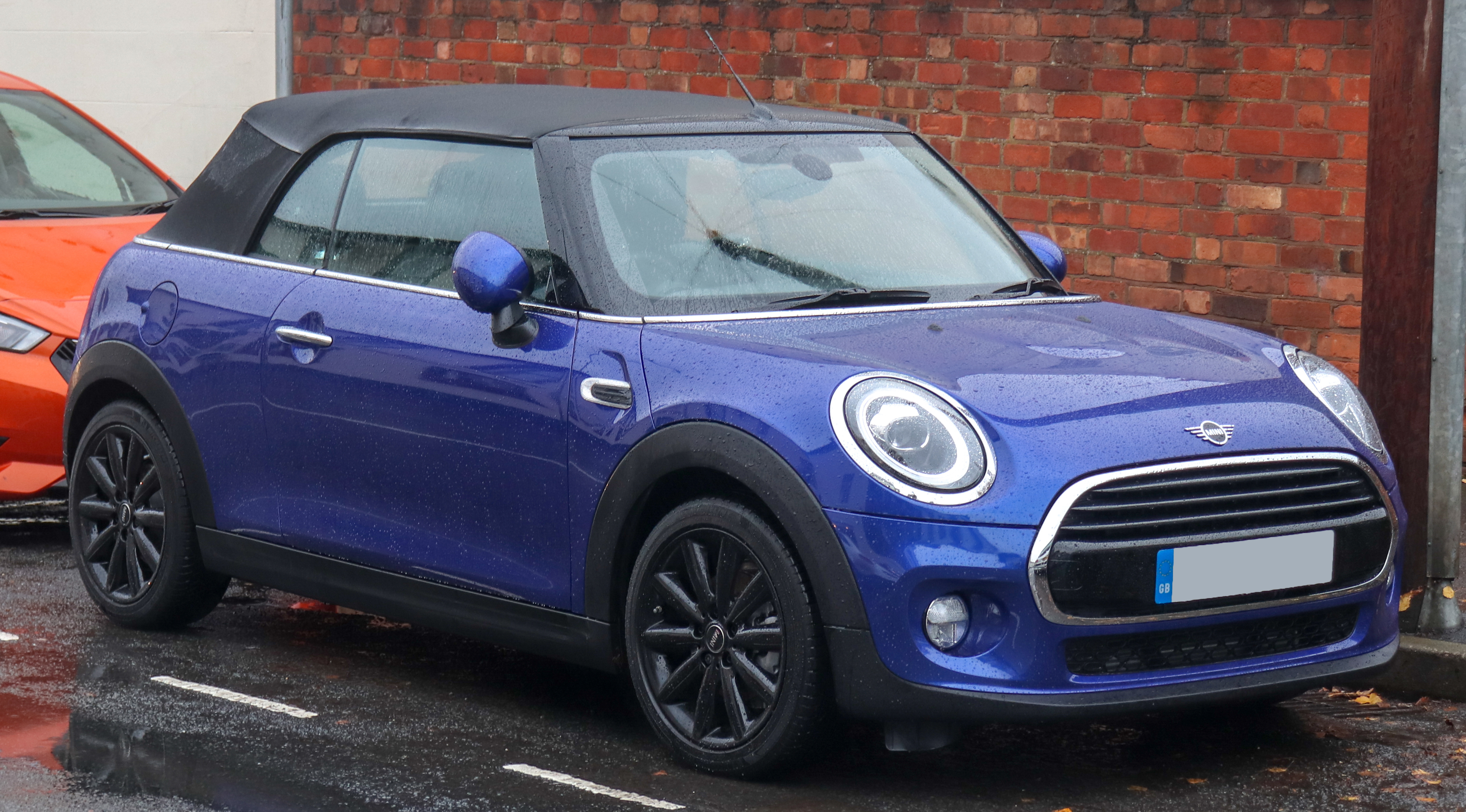
Mini Convertible (F57)

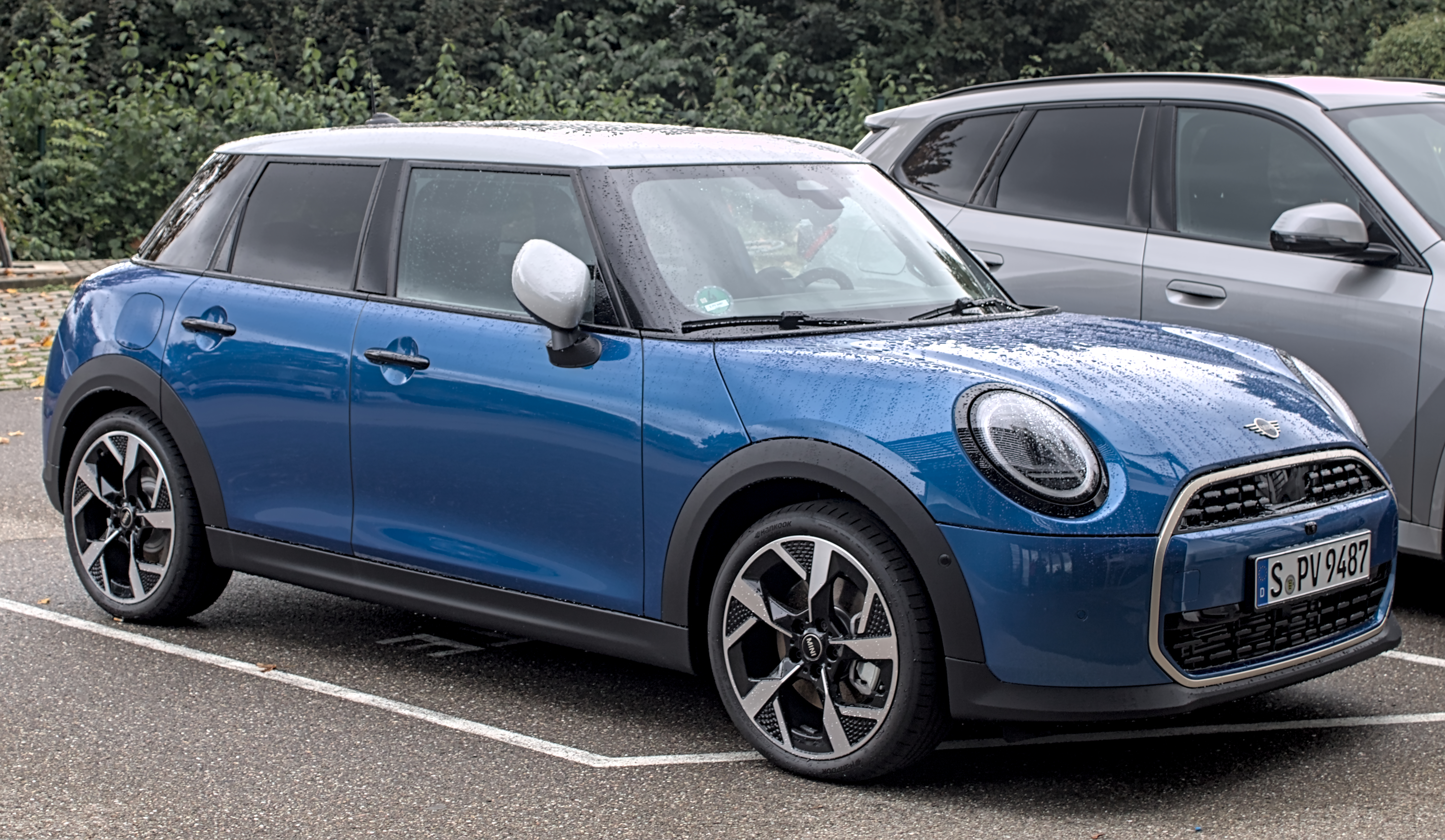
Mini Hatch (F65)

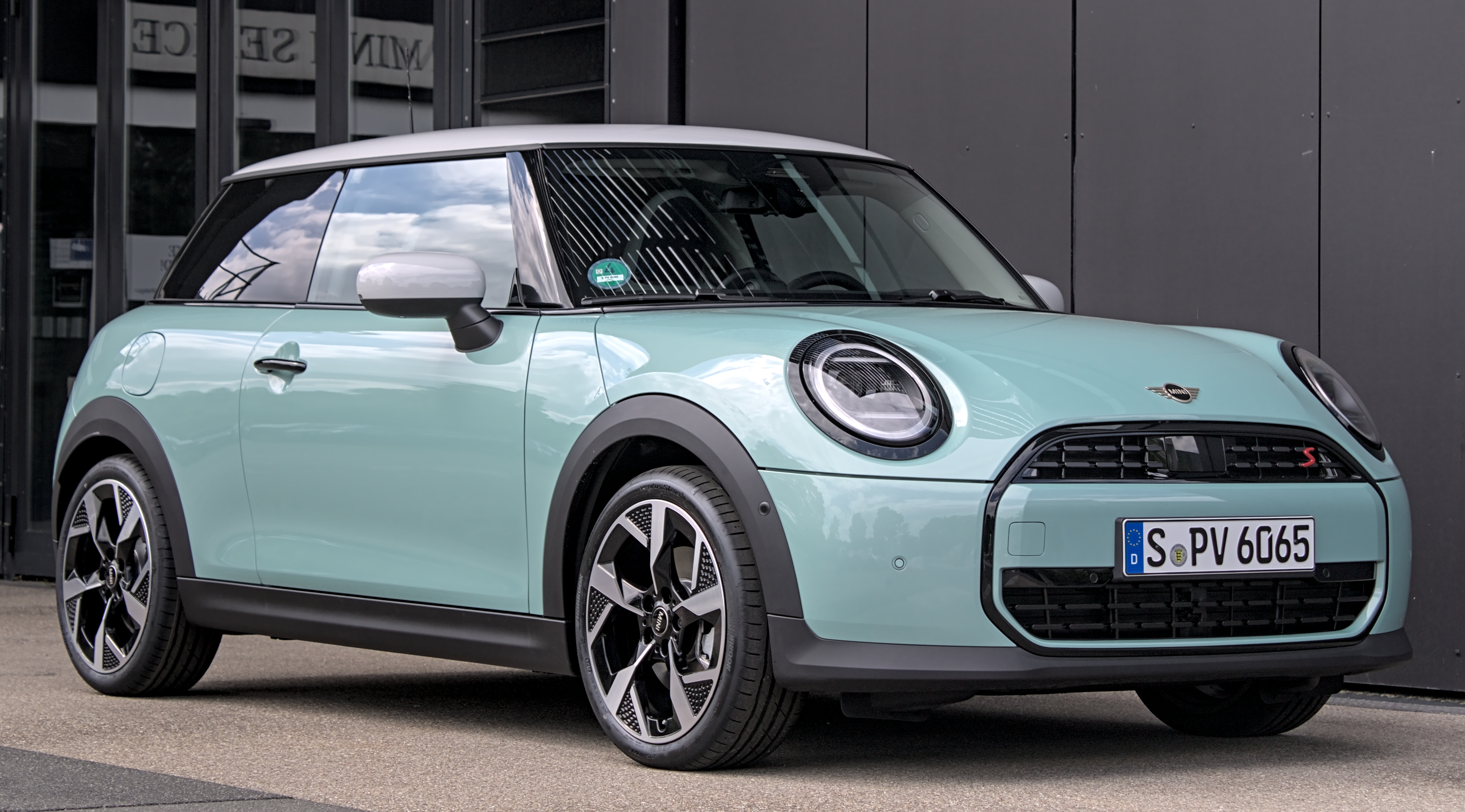
Mini Hatch (F66)

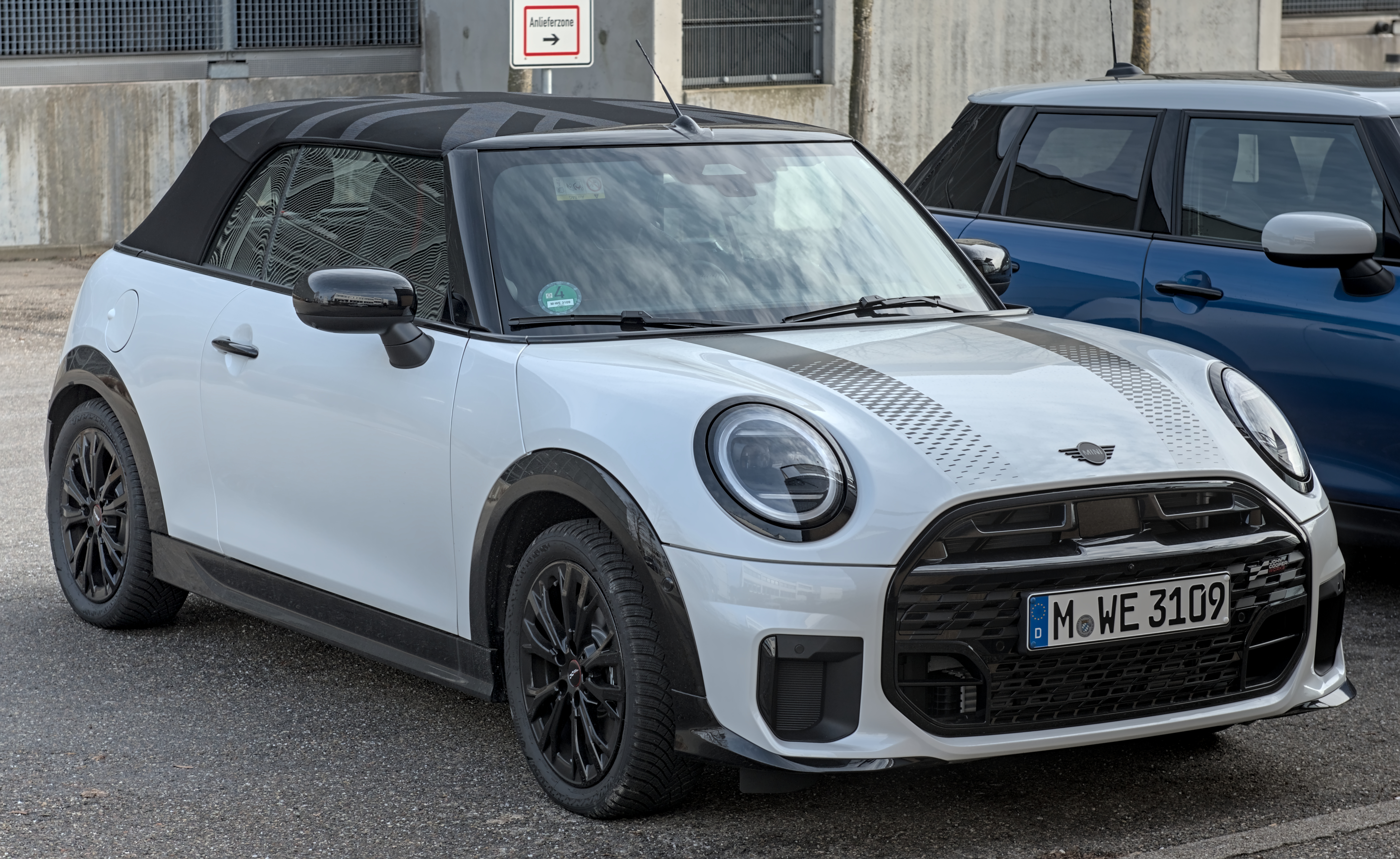
Mini Convertible (F67)

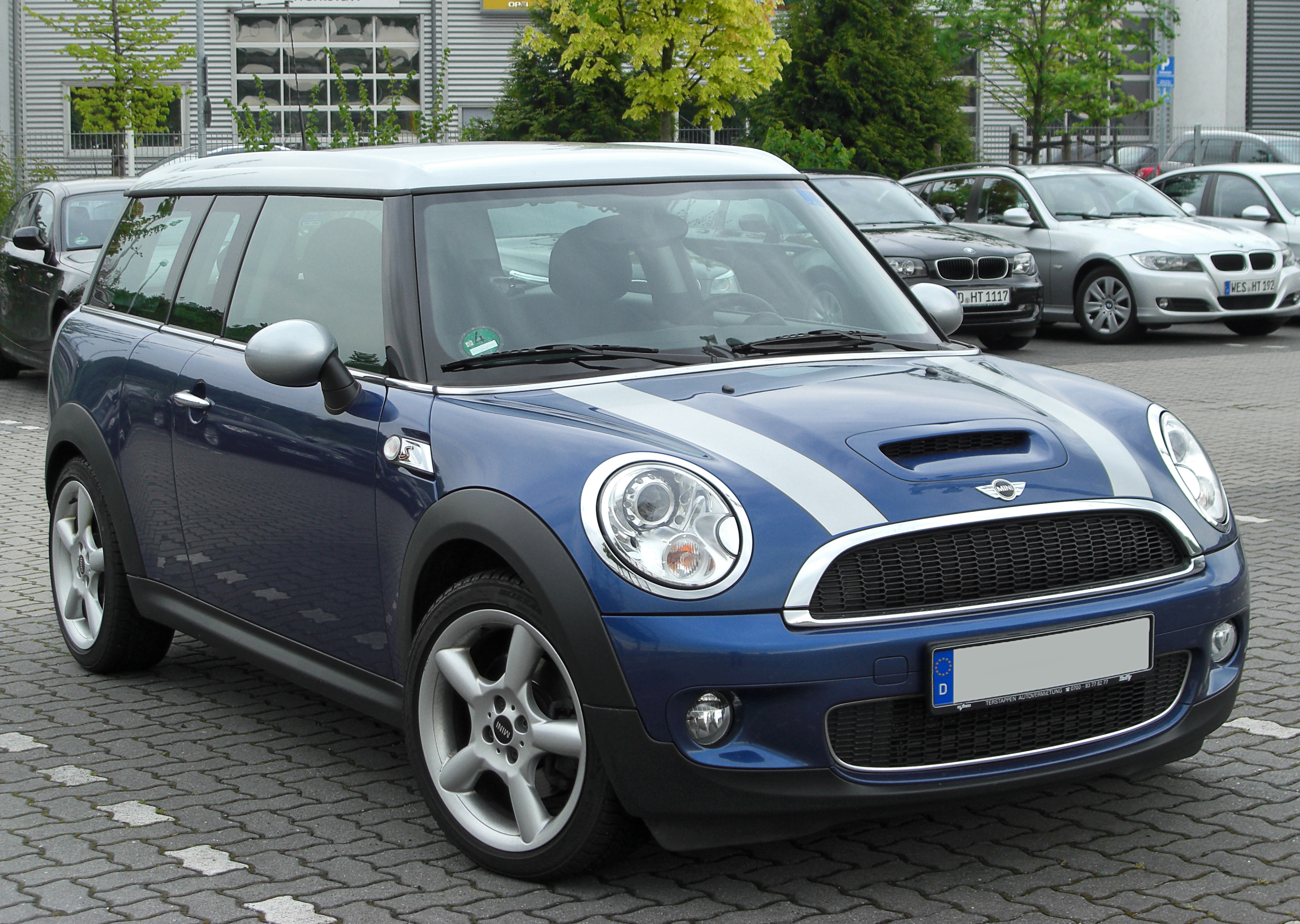
Mini Clubman (R55)

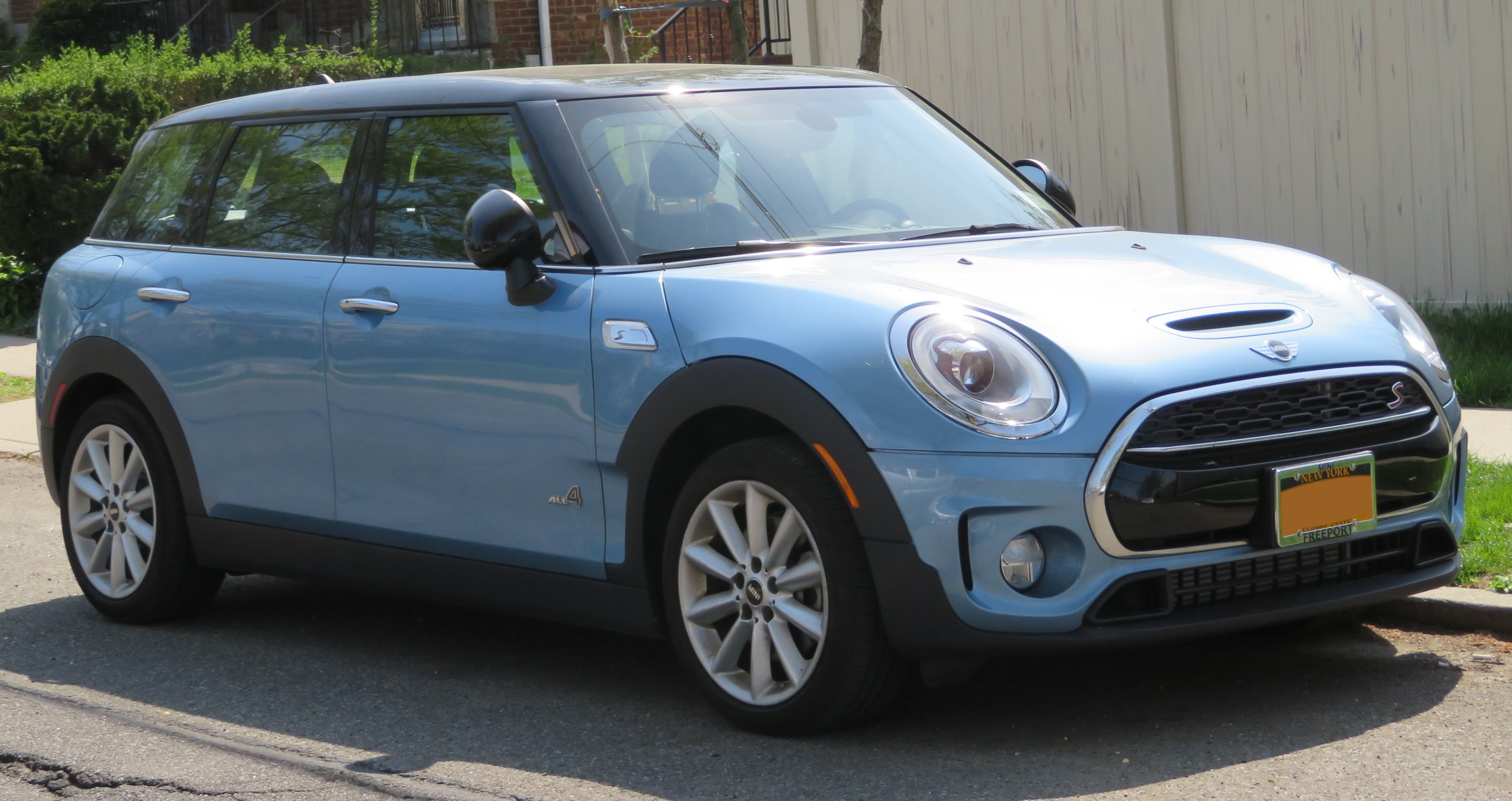
Mini Clubman (F54)

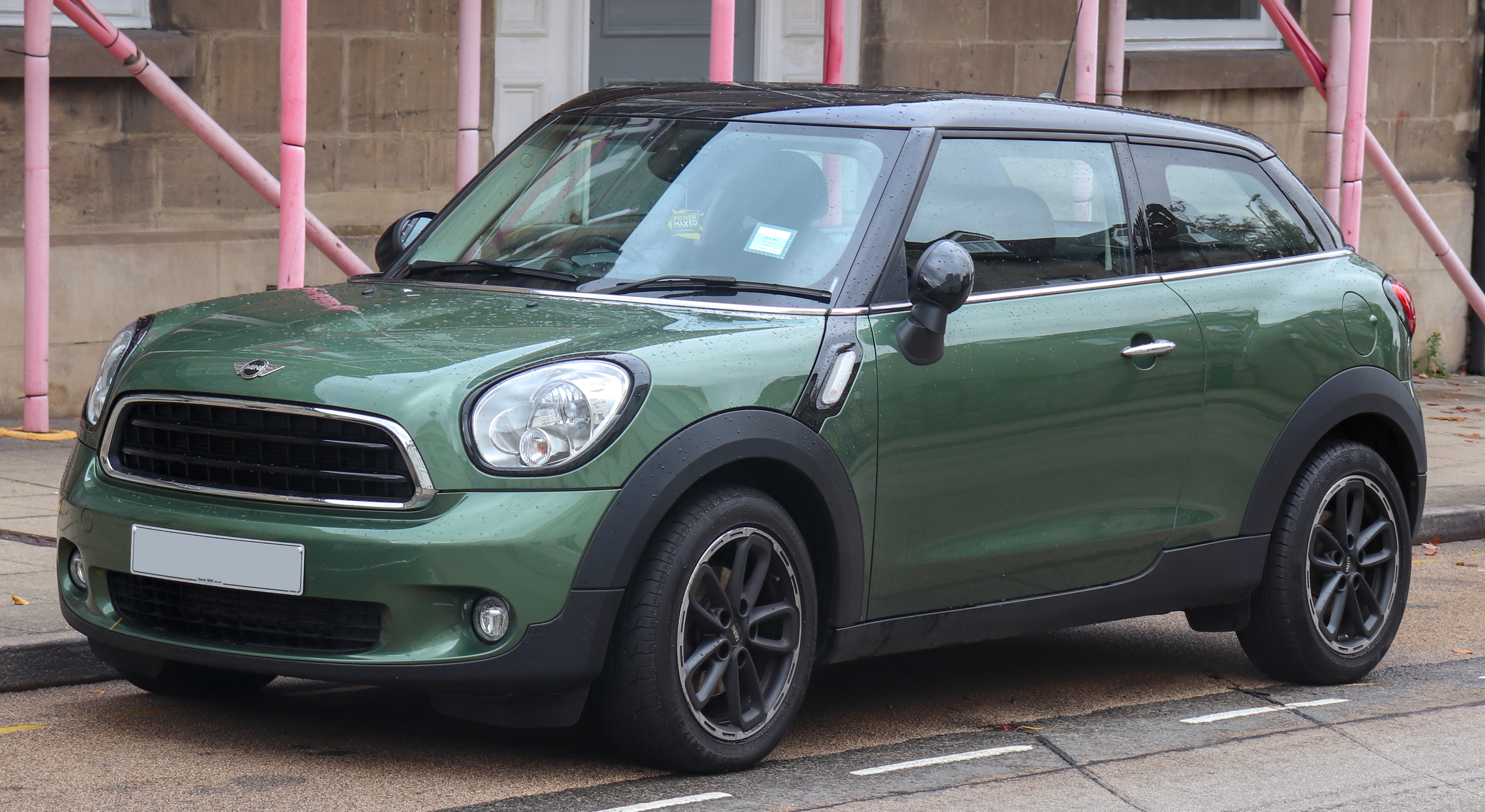
Mini Paceman (R61)

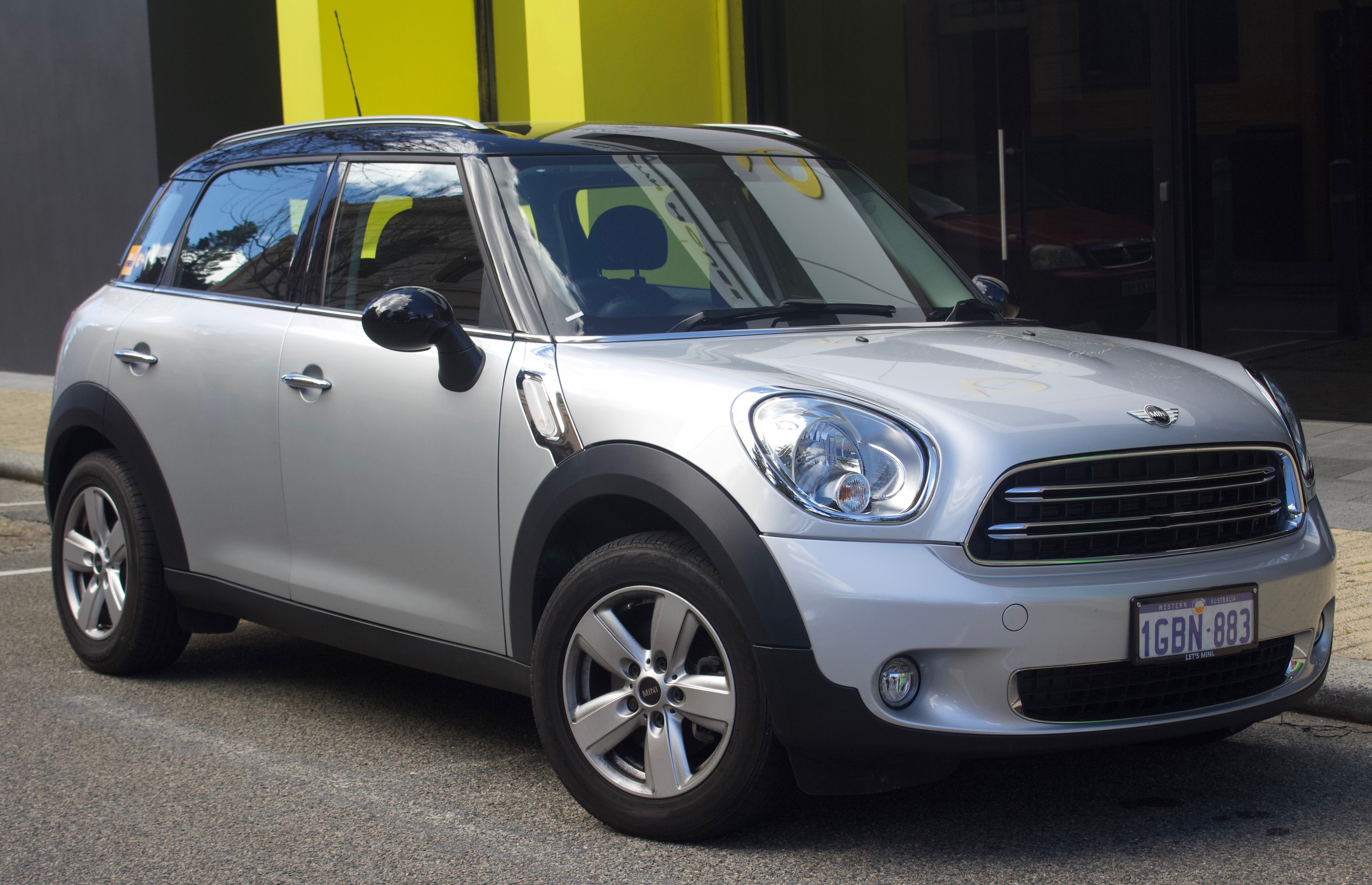
Mini Countryman (R60)

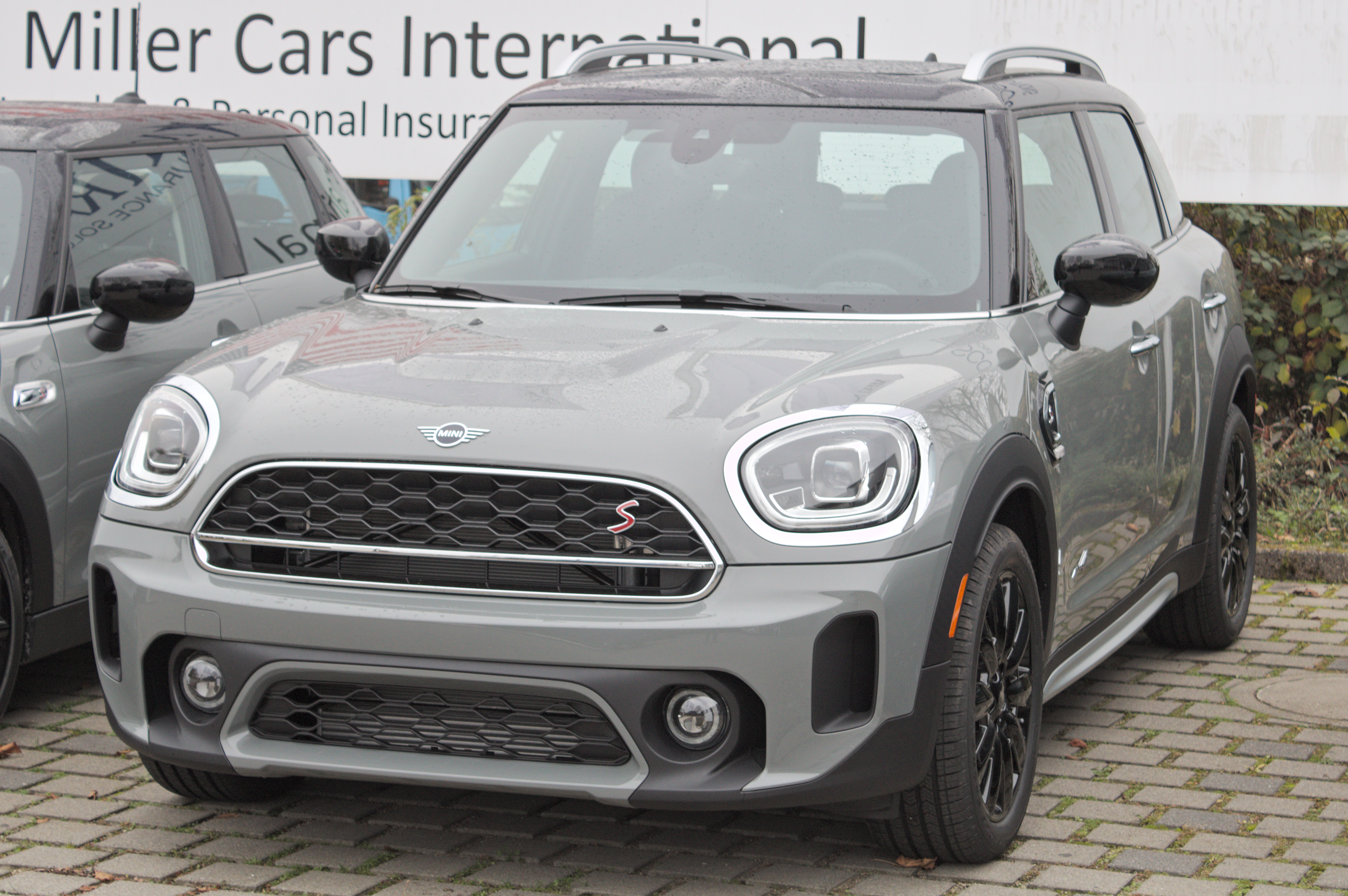
Mini Countryman (F60)

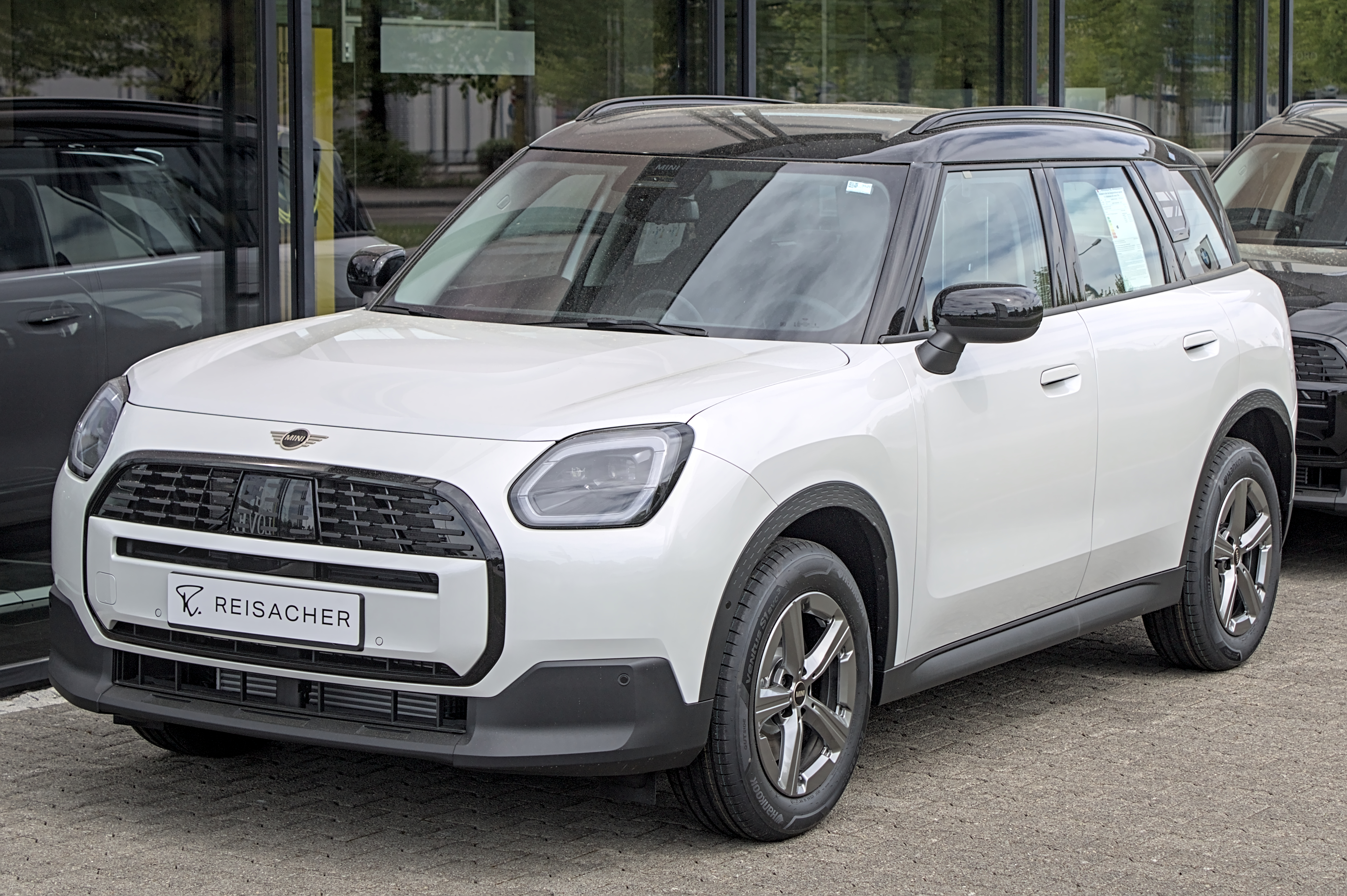
Mini Countryman (U25)

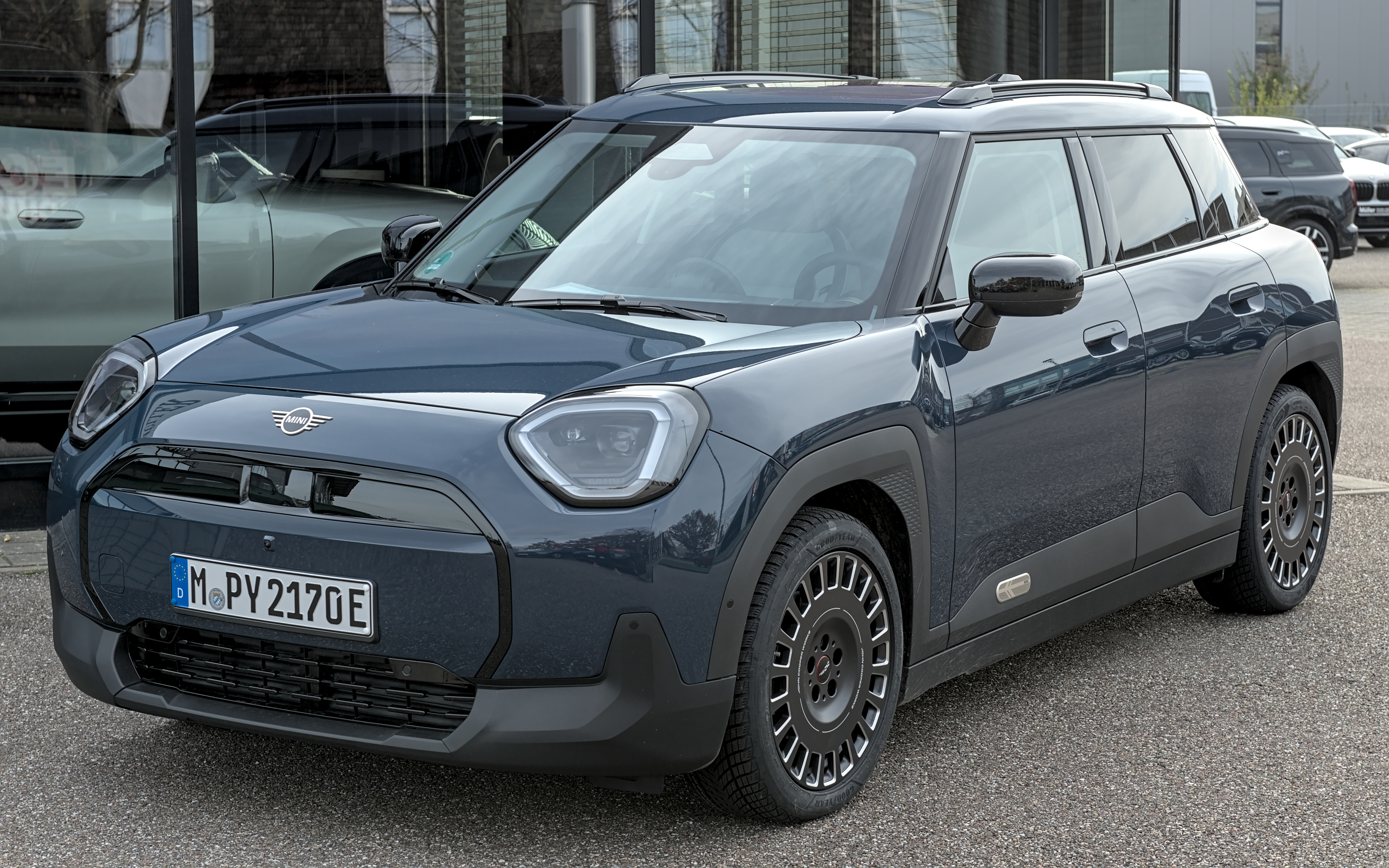
Mini Aceman (J05)

== See also ==
- Cooper Car Company
