= Greg Ira =

American racing driver

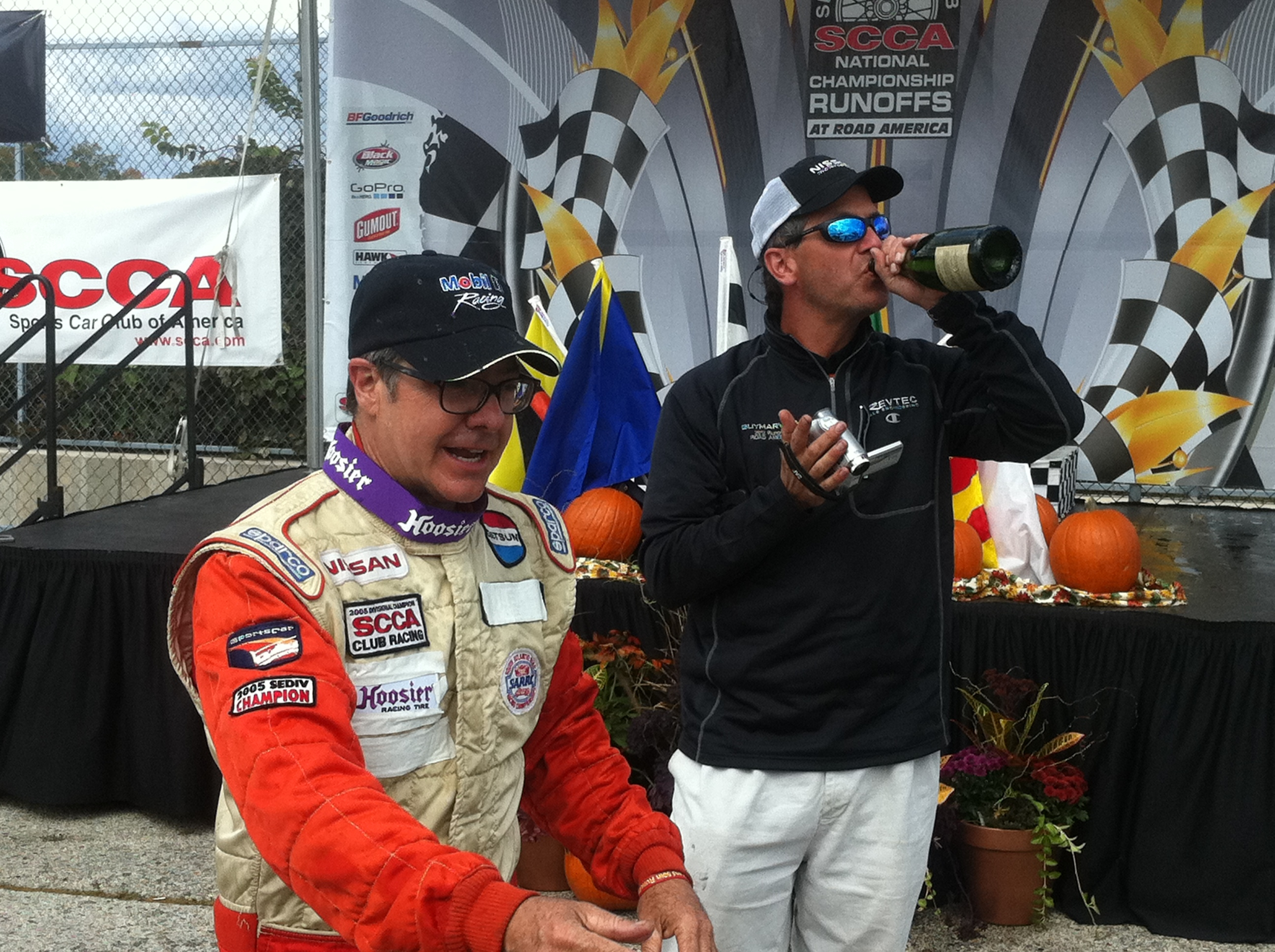

Greg Ira is an SCCA National Champion racing driver from Plantation, Florida, USA.

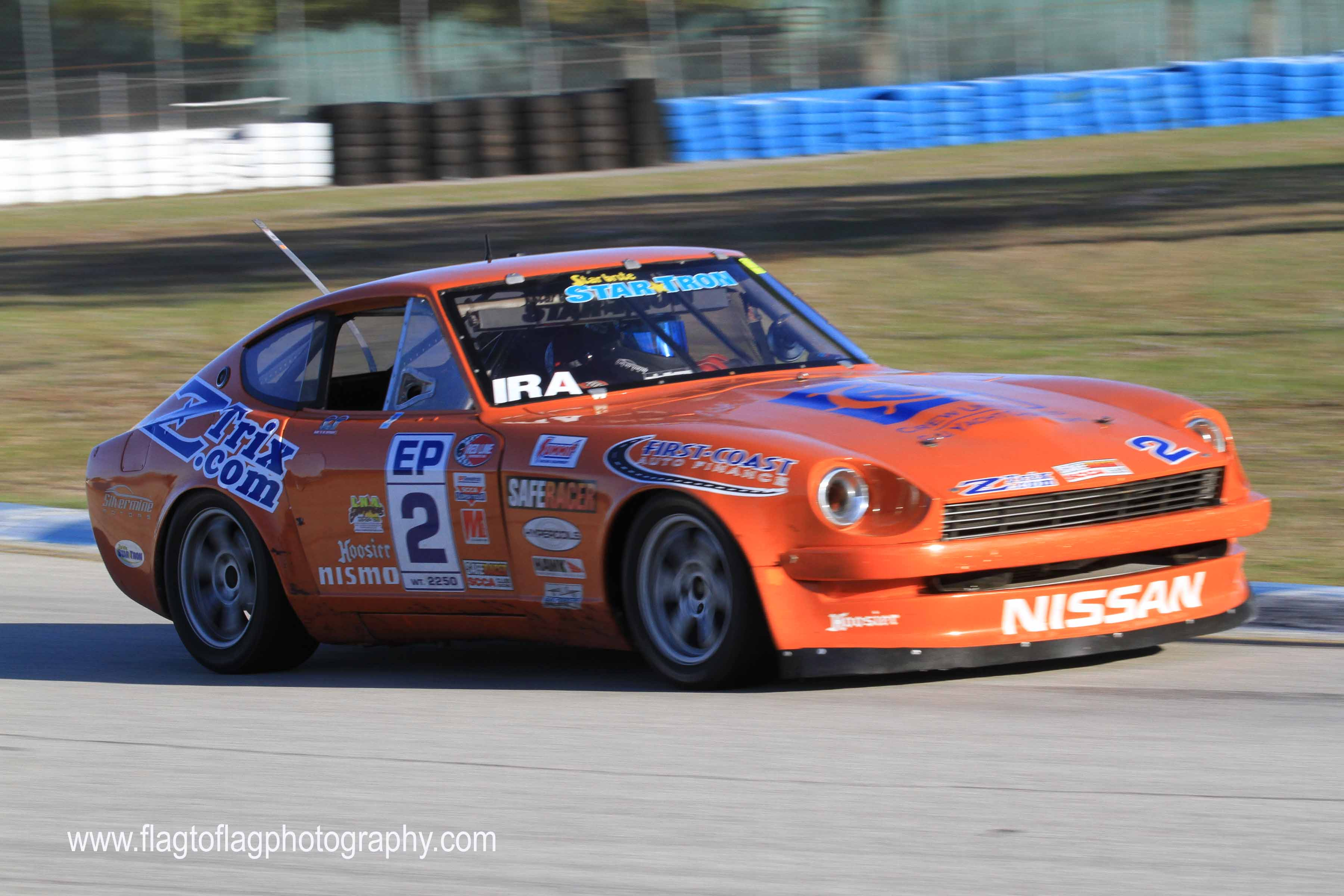
Greg Ira, in his 2013 SCCA E Production National Championship Datsun 240Z, running at the 2015 SCCA Majors at Sebring International Raceway, FL

== Career ==
Ira is a three-time SCCA E Production National Champion. In addition to making it to the hallowed Daytona victory lane in 2015, Ira also won the 2013 Sports Car Club of America E Production National Championship road race in his orange #2 Revtec 1971 Datsun 240Z. The race at Road America at Elkhart Lake, Wisconsin was the 50th anniversary of the SCCA's annual "Runoffs." E Production is the fastest of the production car-based club racing classes.

In the years preceding Ira's championship, he placed 2nd in 2010, 2011, and 2012, and he set several track records with the same car. He was awarded SCCA's Kimberly Cup in 2008. Previous Kimberly Cup winners included Mark Donohue, Roger Penske, Augie Pabst III, and Paul Newman.

Choosing not to defend his title in 2014, Ira instead assisted his younger brother Cliff in winning the 2014 SCCA Super Touring Light National Championship at Laguna Seca Raceway in Monterey, California in an Acura Integra GSR.

Ira started out the 2015 season at Round One of the SCCA's Southeast Conference US Majors Tour at Homestead–Miami Speedway in Florida with a new track record in Race 1, but a DNF due to mechanical failure. However, he repaired his 240Z and came back to claim a solid victory in Race 2.

The Majors Tour round at Sebring International Raceway saw Ira claim 1st place finishes in both races.

On September 27, 2015, Ira won his second (and Nissan's 98th) SCCA National Championship, in his EP2 Revtech/Ztrix.com 240Z, at Daytona International Speedway.

Ira retired the 240Z in 2019, instead vintage racing in other Nissan cars.

However, Jesse Prather offered his Jesse Prather Motorsports championship-winning BMW Z3 to Greg for the 2023 season. Ira won the 2023 E-Production National Championship in the BMW.

== Family history in racing ==
Ira's father Gordon Ira finished 3rd in the SCCA "Runoffs" in 1970 in a G Production Alfa Romeo Spider Veloce; and Greg's older brother Steve finished 4th in Formula Vee (FV) in 1988.

In addition to winning the 2014 STL National Championship, Greg's younger brother Cliff Ira was named the Jim Fitzgerald SCCA National Rookie of the Year for 2014.

== Personal ==
Ira runs Revtec Race Engineering, a company that specializes in Datsuns and other Japanese cars. Greg is the Regional Sales Manager for Valmont Industries., representing the Southeast region of the United States. Valmont is an industry leader and provider of steel in Irrigation, Utility, Wireless Communications, Traffic and Lighting, and also has solutions in Mining, and Industrial coatings.
