= Norma M6 =

Sports car developed and manufactured by Norma Auto Concept

- Category: Group C C1
- Constructor: Norma Auto Concept
- Predecessor: none
- Successor: Norma M14

Technical specifications
- Chassis: Carbon fibre/Kevlar
- Engine: MGN 3.5L W12 mid-engined
- Transmission: Hewland DGB 5-speed
- Weight: 793 kilograms (1,748 lb)
- Tyres: Avon

Competition history
- Notable entrants: (France) ASA Armagnac Bigorre
- Notable drivers: (France) Noël del Bello (France) Norbert Santos (France) Daniel Boccard
- Debut: 1990 24 Hours of Le Mans
Races	Wins	Poles	F/Laps
0	0	0	0
- Constructors' Championships: 0
- Drivers' Championships: 0

The Norma M6 is a Group C sports car developed and manufactured by Norma Auto Concept.

== Norma M6-01 ==
The Norma M6-01 is the only chassis built. It was entered in the 1990 24 Hours of Le Mans by ASA Armagnac Bigorre. ASA Armagnac Bigorre is the FFSA committee in the region which holds the Norma Auto Concept factory. The drivers were Noël del Bello, Daniel Boccard and Norma co-founder Norbert Santos.

During the 1990 24 Hours of Le Mans the car never left the garage. Due to engine trouble the car was unable to qualify. The Norma M6 was originally built to be fitted with a Cosworth V8 engine. Norma eventually chose to fit an experimental Moteur Guy Nègre (MGN) W12 engine. The engine was made to compete in Formula 1 and Guy Nègre tested it in an AGS JH22 in 1989. The engine never found its way to Formula 1 and was converted to fit in the Norma M6.

In 1992 the car was entered by Del Bello Racing in the 1992 24 Hours of Le Mans with drivers Noël del Bello and sports car veteran Thierry Lecerf. For the occasion the car was fitted with an Alfa Romeo V6 engine. The car was on the initial entry list but never attended the race.

Currently the Norma M6 is a wall decoration at the Norma factory in Saint-Pé-de-Bigorre.
