= Norma Auto Concept =

French constructor of racing cars

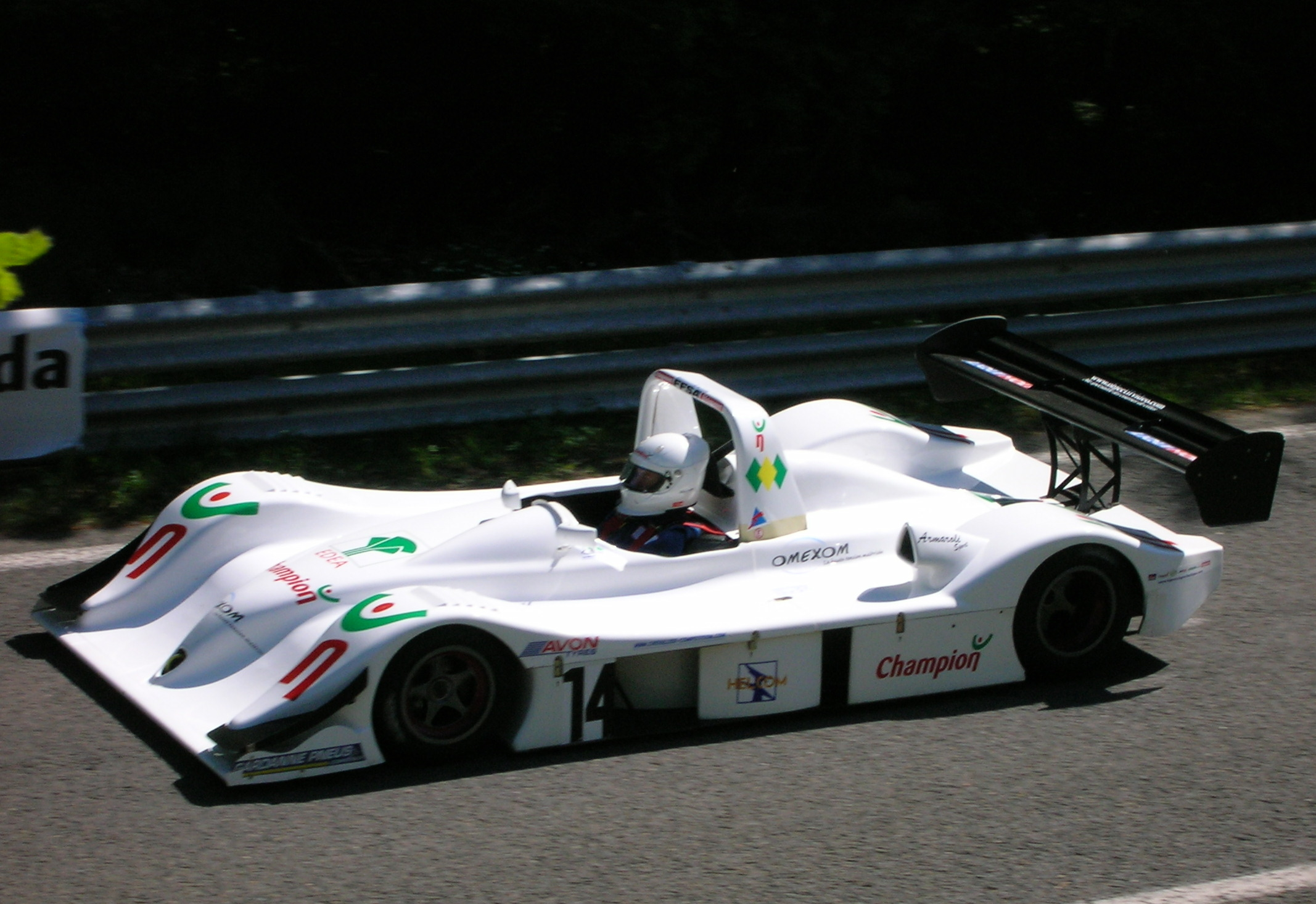
- Type: SAS
- Industry: Automotive
- Founded: 1984
- Founder: Norbert Santos; Marc Doucet
- Headquarters: Saint-Pé-de-Bigorre
- Parent: Duqueine Group
- Website: Norma Auto Concept

Norma Auto Concept is a French constructor of racing cars. It was founded in 1984 by Norbert Santos and Marc Doucet.

== History ==
=== Hillclimbing and initial Le Mans entries ===
Norma was founded by Norbert Santos and Marc Doucet in 1984 and initially designed and built only cars for the French Hillclimbing championship. After success in the hillclimbing scene, Santos and Doucet decided to build a Group C car, the Norma M6. This car was fitted with an experimental MGN (Moteur Guy Nègre) W12 engine. The Norma M6 was entered in the 1990 24 Hours of Le Mans with drivers Daniel Boccard, Norbert Santos and Noël del Bello. The car failed to qualify and was not entered in any other race. Norma's second attempt at Le Mans came in 1995. The Buick powered Norma M14 prequalified 23rd overall and did not qualify to race at the 1995 24 Hours of Le Mans. The car saw a comeback in 1999 when it was entered in the 1999 24 Hours of Daytona. The Norma qualified 26th overall and did not finish the race due to an exhaust failure.

(France) Norma Auto Concept
- Founded: 1997
- Folded: 1999
- Former series: French Formula Renault Championship
- Noted drivers: (France) Renaud Malinconi (France) Stéphane Gautré

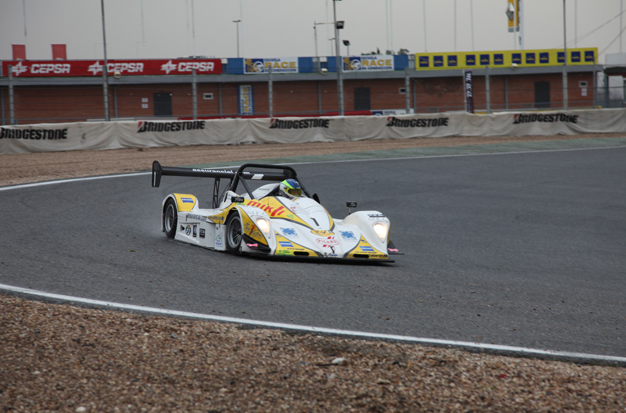
David Zollinger racing a Norma M20F at Jarama in the V de V series

=== Formula Renault ===
Between 1997 and 1999 Norma Auto Concept entered the French Formula Renault Championship, as a team, not a constructor. In 1997 Norma entered Renaud Malinconi driving a Martini MK76. Malinconi finished eighth in the final standings achieving two podium finishes. More success in Formula Renault came in 1999 with Stéphane Gautré driving a Martini MK77. Achieving one win and four podium finishes he ended up fourth in the standings. With the introduction of the spec Tatuus Formula Renault in 2000 Norma ceased their Formula Renault activities.

=== Racing at Le Mans and Group CN success ===
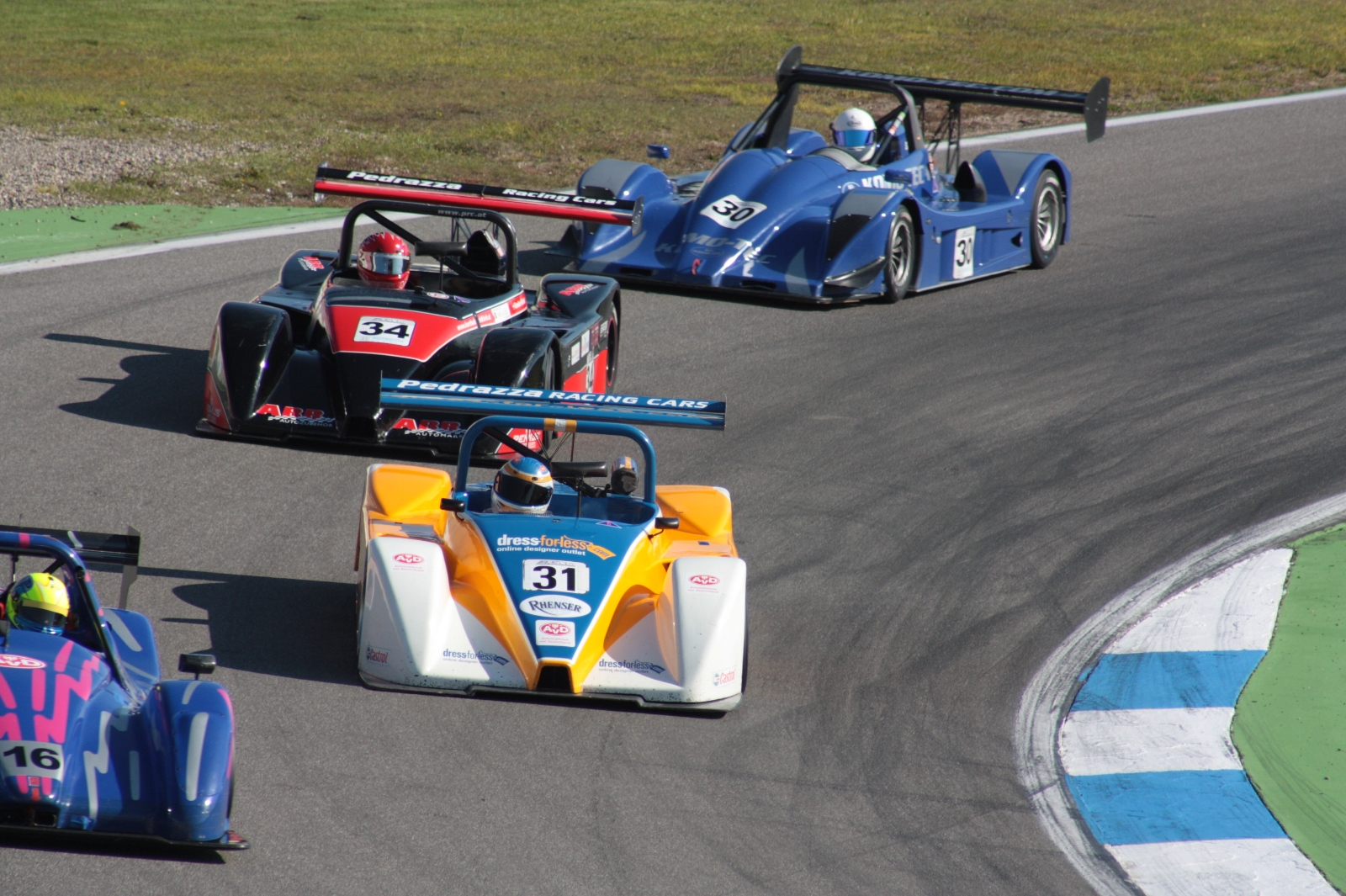
Norma M20-F at the Hockenheim Sports Car Challenge in 2010

A more successful prototype came in 2000, the Norma M2000. This car raced in 2000 thru to 2003. The car was solely entered by Sezio Florida Racing Team and saw a best result of 3rd. In 2001 and 2002 the car entered full-time in the Rolex Sports Car Series The team made four attempts to start at the 24 Hours of Le Mans, they succeeded in their last attempt in 2003. They started 36th overall but did not finish due to an engine failure, 8 hours, 39 minutes in the race. For the design of the Norma M2000 Santos and Doucet were joined by Edouard Sézionale who would also accompany them with the design of the Group CN cars.

After their Le Mans experience Norma designed and built Group CN prototypes starting with the Norma M20. Norma produced 30 Norma M20 cars in 2003 and 2004. Norma continues to develop the Norma M20, the current Norma M20 FC is entered in the V de V, Speed EuroSeries and other sportsracing series. A Norma has won the V de V Prototype Endurance Challenge in 2009, 2010, 2011 and 2012. Anthony Gandon achieved a second place in the Speed EuroSeries ranking driving a Norma M20 FC in 2012. Another attempt at Le Mans was made in 2010. The Pegasus Racing entered a Norma M200P, but it did not finish the race. The following season the car was taken over by Extreme Limite which entered in the Le Mans Series and the 24 Hours of Le Mans in 2011 and 2012. The best finish for the car was a fifth place at the 6 Hours of Estoril in 2011.

=== Pikes Peak ===
In 2014, Romain Dumas won the Pikes Peak hill climb in the Norma M20 "RD Limited", developed specifically for the event. Driving in the Unlimited class, Dumas finished in a time of 9:05.801. Dumas won once again two years later with the 2016 specification of M20 RD Limited with the time of 8:51:445.

=== FIA European Hill Climb Championship ===
In 2014 Norma entered into FIA European Hill Climb Championship with type Norma M20 FC Zytec (3L naturally-aspirated V8 engine). Italian driver Simone Faggioli (with direct factory support) won the championship for Category 2 (Competition Cars - single seater, sport-prototypes and silhouettes) in 2014, 2015, 2016, 2017 and 2019. Simone Faggioli and Norma created a lot of track records and registered indelibly in the history of this series.

=== SCCA National Championship Runoffs ===
Starting in 2014, Jim Devenport drove a Norma M20FC with a Honda K20 2 liter engine to a 3rd-place finish at the Runoffs at Laguna Seca in the class Prototype 1. In 2015, same car and driver finished 2nd at the Daytona Runoffs. In 2016, a new lighter weight M20FC was driven by Jim Devenport to first place at the Runoffs in P1 at Mid-Ohio giving Norma its first Runoffs victory.

== 24 Hours of Le Mans results ==
Year	Team	Drivers	Car	Engine	Qualification	Result
1990	(France) ASA Armagnac Bigorre	(France) Noël del Bello	Norma M6	MGN 3.5 L W12	DNQ	DNA
1990	(France) ASA Armagnac Bigorre	(France) Norbert Santos	Norma M6	MGN 3.5 L W12	DNQ	DNA
1990	(France) ASA Armagnac Bigorre	(France) Daniel Boccard	Norma M6	MGN 3.5 L W12	DNQ	DNA
1992	(France) Del Bello Racing	(France) Noël del Bello	Norma M6	Alfa Romeo V6	DNA	DNA
1992	(France) Del Bello Racing	(France) Thierry Lecerf	Norma M6	Alfa Romeo V6	DNA	DNA
1995	(France) Norma	(France) Dominique Lacaud	Norma M14	Mader Buick 4.5 L V6	DNQ	DNA
1995	(France) Norma	(Belgium) Jean-Paul Libert	Norma M14	Mader Buick 4.5 L V6	DNQ	DNA
1995	(France) Norma	(France) Pascal Dro	Norma M14	Mader Buick 4.5 L V6	DNQ	DNA
2001	(France) Sezio Florida Racing Team	(France) Edouard Sezionale	Norma M2000	Mader BMW V8	DNA	DNA
2001	(France) Sezio Florida Racing Team	(France) Patrice Roussel	Norma M2000	Mader BMW V8	DNA	DNA
2003	(France) Sezio Florida Racing Team	(France) Patrice Roussel	Norma M2000	Ford 6.0 L V8	36	DNF (Engine)
2003	(France) Sezio Florida Racing Team	(France) Edouard Sezionale	Norma M2000	Ford 6.0 L V8	36	DNF (Engine)
2003	(France) Sezio Florida Racing Team	(France) Lucas Lasserre	Norma M2000	Ford 6.0 L V8	36	DNF (Engine)
2010	(France) Pegasus Racing	(France) Julien Schell	Norma M200P	Judd DB 3.4 L V8	28	DNF (Accident damage)
2010	(France) Pegasus Racing	(France) Frédéric da Rocha	Norma M200P	Judd DB 3.4 L V8	28	DNF (Accident damage)
2010	(France) Pegasus Racing	(France) David Zollinger	Norma M200P	Judd DB 3.4 L V8	28	DNF (Accident damage)
2011	(France) Extreme Limite AM Paris	(France) Fabien Rosier	Norma M200P	Judd-BMW 4.0 L V8	26	NC (28)
2011	(France) Extreme Limite AM Paris	(France) Philippe Haezebrouck	Norma M200P	Judd-BMW 4.0 L V8	26	NC (28)
2011	(France) Extreme Limite AM Paris	(France) Jean-René de Fournoux	Norma M200P	Judd-BMW 4.0 L V8	26	NC (28)
2012	(France) Extreme Limite AM Paris	(France) Fabien Rosier	Norma M200P	Judd HK 3.6 L V8	33	29
2012	(France) Extreme Limite AM Paris	(France) Philippe Haezebrouck	Norma M200P	Judd HK 3.6 L V8	33	29
2012	(France) Extreme Limite AM Paris	(France) Fabien Thirion	Norma M200P	Judd HK 3.6 L V8	33	29

== Cars ==
Year	Car	Image	Class
1984	Norma M4		Hillclimbing
1985	Norma M5		Hillclimbing
1990	Norma M6		Group C
1991	Norma M7		Group CN
1994	Norma M11		Group CN
1995	Norma M14		24 Hours of Daytona Can-Am, 24 Hours of Le Mans LMP1
1996	Norma M16		Group CN
1998	Norma M17		Group CN
1999	Norma M18		Group CN
2000	Norma M2000		LMP900/Grand-Am SR/SRP
2003	Norma M20		Group CN 2L
2004	Norma M20-3A		Group CN 3L
2005	Norma M20-2B		Group CN 2L
2007	Norma M20-F		Group CN 2L/3L
2010	Norma M200P		LMP2
2011	Norma M20-FC		Group CN 2L
2014	Norma M20-FC (Hill climb specification)		Hillclimbing Group E2-SC 3L
2017	Norma M30		LMP3
2018	Volkswagen I.D. R (monocoque only)		PPIHC, Unlimited
