= Craig Conway =

Craig Conway may refer to:

- Craig Conway (footballer) (born 1985), Scottish footballer
- Craig Conway, American driver 2002 24 Hours of Daytona
