= Norma M14 =

Le Mans Prototype race car

- Category: WSC
- Constructor: Norma Auto Concept
- Production: 1995
- Predecessor: Norma M6
- Successor: Norma M2000

Technical specifications
- Chassis: Carbon fiber
- Engine: Buick 4,500 cc (4.5 L; 274.6 cu in) V6 N/A mid-mounted
- Transmission: Hewland 5-speed sequential
- Power: 550 hp (558 PS; 410 kW)
- Weight: 868 kg (1,913.6 lb)
- Brakes: AP carbon discs
- Tyres: Goodyear

Competition history
- Notable entrants: (France) SBF Racing
- Notable drivers: (France) Dominique Lacaud (France) Patrice Roussel (France) Edouard Sezionale (France) Sylvain Boulay
- Debut: 1999 24 Hours of Daytona
- Last event: 1999 24 Hours of Daytona
Races	Wins	Podiums	Poles	F/Laps
1	0	0	0	0
- Teams' Championships: 0
- Constructors' Championships: 0
- Drivers' Championships: 0

The Norma M14 is a Le Mans Prototype (LMP) racing car designed, developed and built by French constructor Norma for competition in sports car racing. One chassis was built.

== Racing history ==
In 1995, the Norma factory team returned to compete at Le Mans with a new open cockpit design for their World Sports Car class prototype. The car entered in prequalifying for the race and made the entry list. However, they would not qualify for the race, sustaining engine issues.

The chassis would reappear in 1999 in the United States Road Racing Championship in the hands of SBF racing. The team entered the 24 Hours of Daytona with drivers Patrice Roussel, Edouard Sezionale and Sylvain Boulay. They would retire from the race with exhaust issues and it would be the final race of the car's troubled and brief career.
