= Norma M200P =

Sports Prototype race car

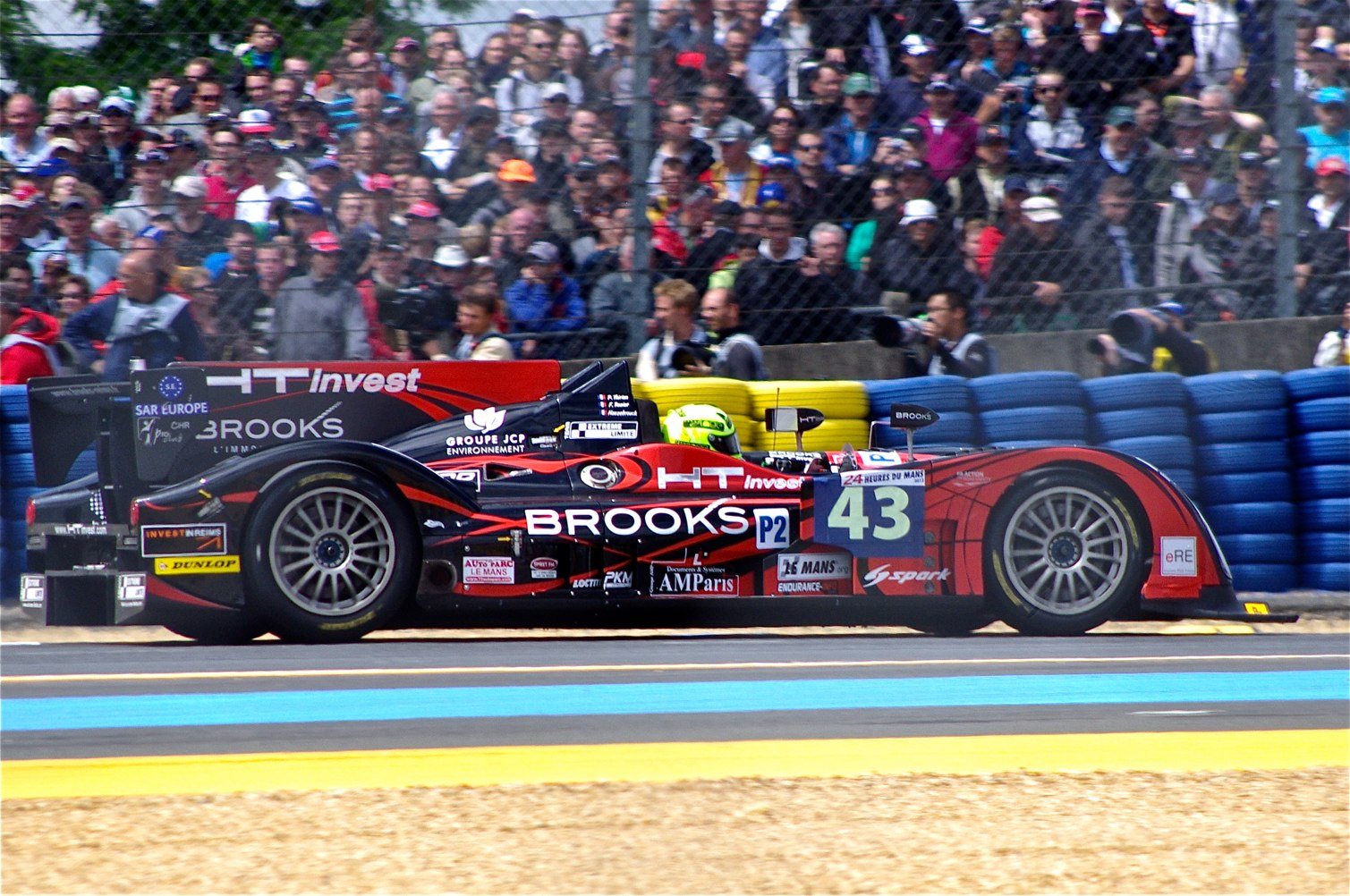
- Category: Le Mans Prototype (LMP2)
- Constructor: Norma Auto Concept
- Designer: Edouard Sézionale
- Predecessor: Norma M2000

Technical specifications
- Chassis: Carbon fibre monocoque
- Length: 4650 mm
- Width: 2000 mm
- Height: 1070 mm
- Wheelbase: 2950 mm
- Engine: Judd HK / BMW P65 3.6 litre V8 mid-engined, longitudinally mounted
- Transmission: Xtrac 6-speed sequential manual
- Weight: 900 kilograms (2,000 lb)
- Tyres: Dunlop

Competition history
- Notable entrants: (France) Pegasus Racing (France) Extreme Limite AM Paris
- Notable drivers: (France) David Zollinger (France) Frédéric da Rocha (France) Julien Schell (Switzerland) Maurice Basso (France) Fabien Rosier (France) Philippe Haezebrouck (France) Jean-René de Fournoux (Portugal) Manuel Mello-Breyner (Portugal) Pedro Mello-Breyner (France) Fabien Thirion (Switzerland) Jean-Marc Luco

The Norma M200P is a Le Mans Prototype built by Norma Auto Concept in 2010.

== Racing history ==
=== 2010 ===
Chassis number 02 was built for the French Pegasus Racing to compete in the 2010 24 Hours of Le Mans. The car was on the reserve list for the race but, when the Dome LMP1 was withdrawn, Pegasus Racing was granted an entry. The car was driven by Julien Schell, Frédéric da Rocha and David Zollinger. Pegasus Racing qualified 28th overall and 10th in the LMP2 class. Julien Schell started the race. The race was cut short after 3 hours, when the Spyker Squadron Spyker C8 tried to rejoin the track and hit the Norma. The gearbox was severely damaged and Xtrac did not have the spare parts to repair it.

=== 2011 ===
For 2011 the 02 chassis was sold to Extreme Limite. Extreme Limite was a regular competitor in the V de V Proto Endurance championship, entering various Normas. The team entered it in the 2011 Le Mans Series season and the 2011 24 Hours of Le Mans. Five different drivers competed in the endurance races in the Le Mans Series. Fabien Rosier ended up highest in the standings with a 9th place.

The Extreme Limite entry was not on the initial entry list for the 2011 24 Hours of Le Mans, but was accepted after the second Signatech entry was withdrawn. The car was driven by Fabien Rosier, Philippe Haezebrouck and Jean-René de Fournoux. The Norma M200P qualified 26th overall and 9th in the LMP2 class. Extreme Limite finished the race but the car was not classified due to electrical problems slowing down the race path.

=== 2012 ===
Extreme Limite entered the Norma M200P in the 2012 24 Hours of Le Mans and the 2012 European Le Mans Series season. In the European Le Mans Series the team only competed in the 6 Hours of Castellet at Circuit Paul Ricard. Extreme Limite finished 8th in the LMP2 class. They eventually were placed 9th in the teams standings.

For the first time in the history of the Norma M200P the car was on the official entry list of the 24 Hours of Le Mans, not the reserve list. The team qualified 33rd overall and 19th in class. In a race with some power steering issues and an exhaust problem the car finished the race and was classified 29th overall and 12th in class.
