= Tata OneCAT =

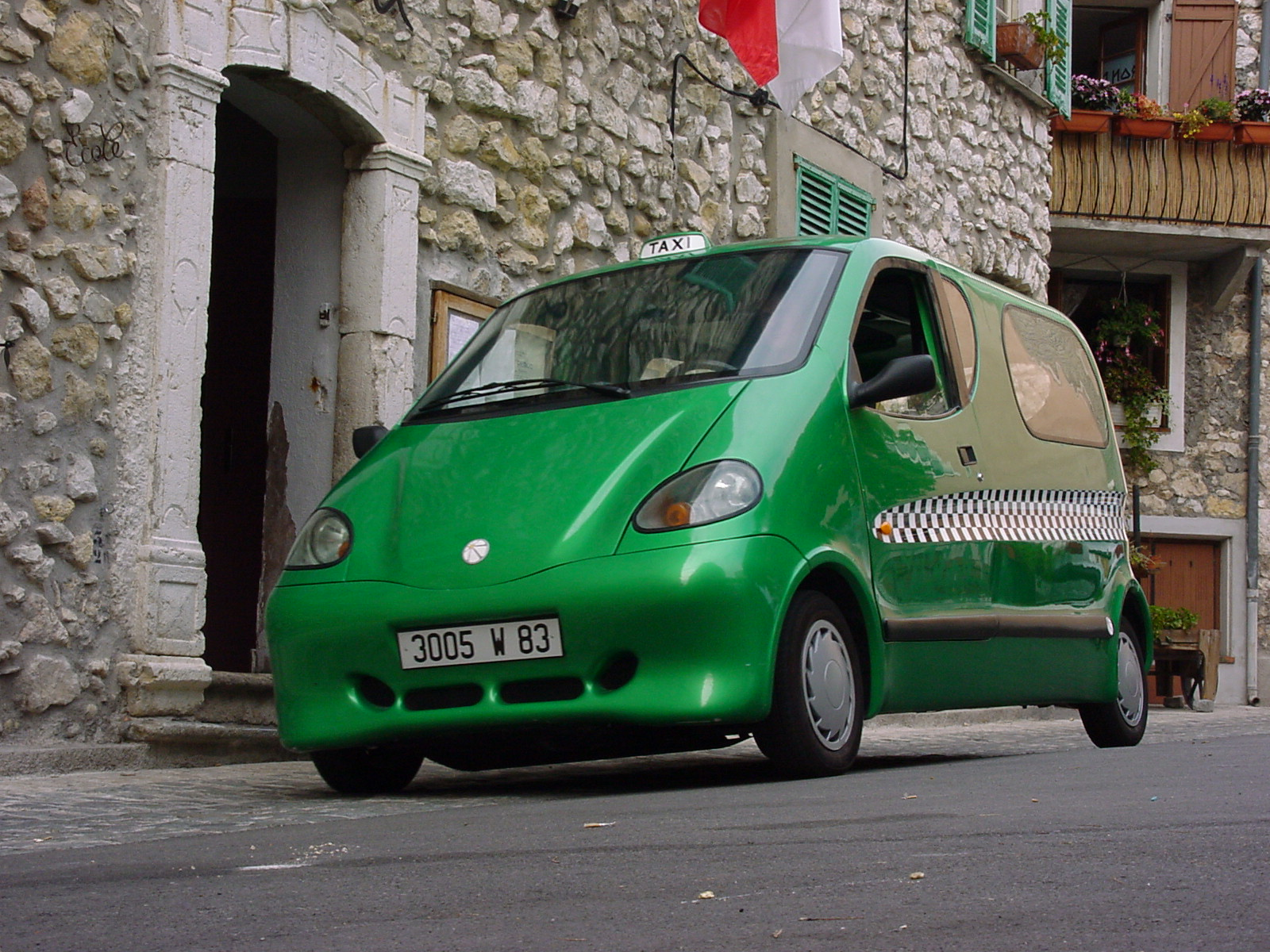
- Tata/MDI OneCAT

Overview
- Manufacturer: Tata Motors

The Tata OneCAT (Compressed Air Technology) was advertised as an upcoming compressed air car in 2008. India's Tata Motors was said to be collaborating with Air engine developer Guy Nègre of MDI to produce the vehicle.

The vehicle contains air tanks that can be filled in four hours by plugging the car into a standard electrical plug. MDI also plans to design a gas station compressor, which would fill the tanks in three minutes.

The OneCAT is a five-seat vehicle with a 200 litre trunk. There is no reliable data on range and top speed available.

As of August 2009, there was no mention of the prototype or planned production on the TATA or MDI homepages. In December 2009 Tata's vice president of engineering systems confirmed that the limited range and low engine temperatures were causing difficulties. Meanwhile, all links, articles and archives relative to MDI have disappeared from Tata's website.

In February 2012, Tata released information that their compressed-air vehicle would debut in August 2012.

In February 2017, a news report claimed the TaTa 'AirPod' would be launched by 2020, but the car has not been launched yet.
