= Shane Lewis (racing driver) =

American racing driver

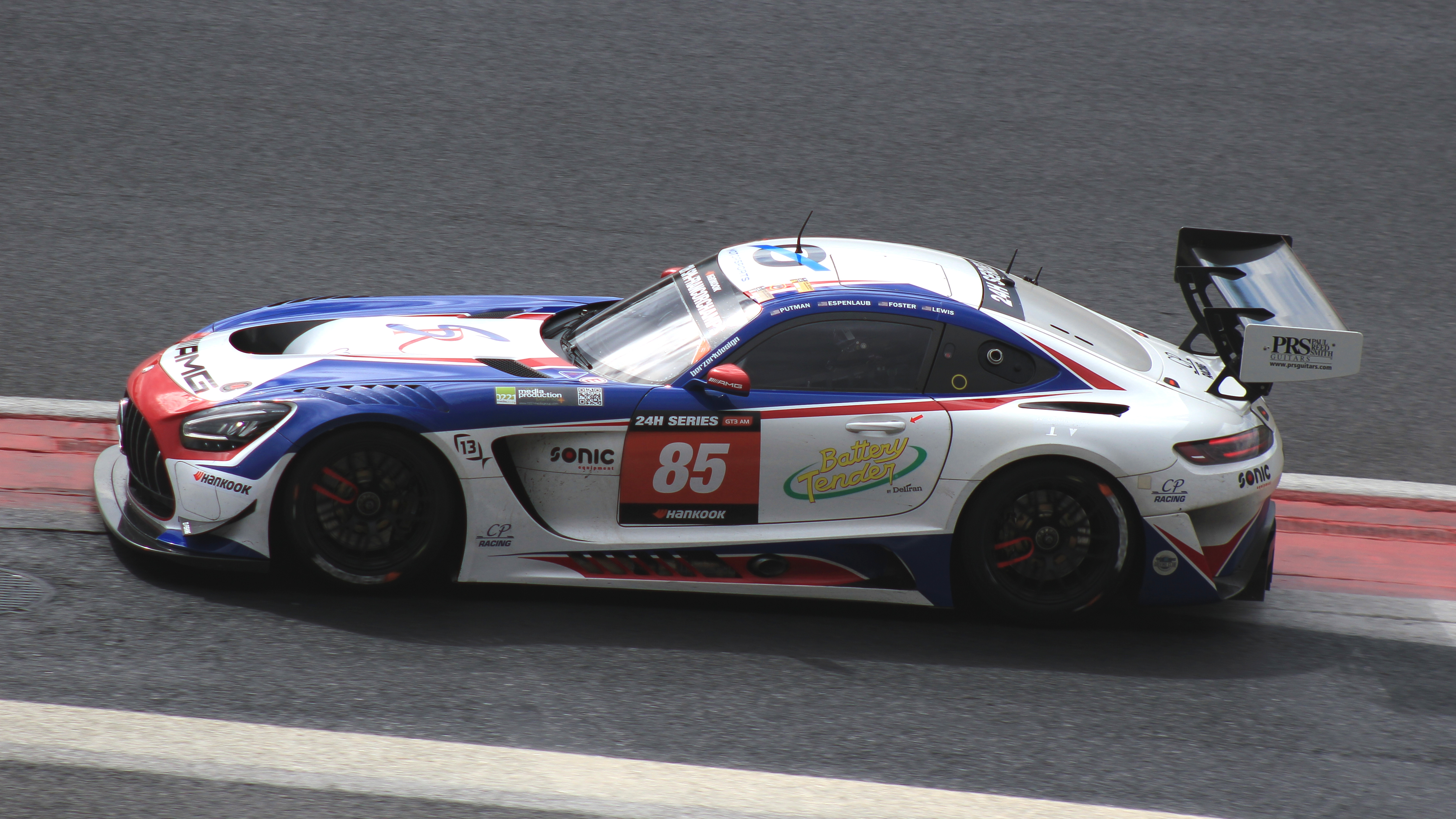
- Nationality: American
- Born: August 8, 1967 (age 59)
- Categorisation: FIA Gold (until 2013); FIA Silver (2014–2017); FIA Bronze (2018–)

Shane Lewis (born August 8, 1967) is an American racing driver who has competed primarily in endurance sports car racing. He also competes in Unlimited Trophy Truck desert racing and short course SXS racing.

== Career ==
Lewis's motorsport career began in 1989 in Southern California. At the end of the year, he won the twentieth edition of the United States Formula Ford Festival.

From 1991 onwards, Lewis started regularly in SCCA and IMSA races. In 1995, he won the IMSA supercar races at Mid-Ohio and Phoenix.

In the 1996 SCCA Pro Racing World Challenge, Lewis finished second in the championship behind Almo Coppelli. In 1997, he began competing in the IMSA GT Championship in the GT1 class. Soon after, he began participating in both Grand-Am Road Racing and American Le Mans Series events. Lewis drove extensively in the Rolex Sports Car Series for the Southard Motorsports Daytona Prototype team, while in American Le Mans he drove for a variety of teams, mostly in GT classes. He secured a total of three race victories between the two series, including the 2013 24 Hours of Daytona in the GX class.

Lewis has also raced in European events, including three editions of the 24 Hours of Le Mans and five of the 24 Hours of the Nürburgring. He has taken victory in class in the 2010 24 Hours of the Nürburgring and the 2013 24 Hours of Dubai and the 24 hours of Daytona.

Lewis has made brief forays into other disciplines of racing, including an attempted NASCAR start in 2002 at Watkins Glen International, an ARCA start in 2001 at Atlanta Motor Speedway, and an Indy Pro series start in 2007 at Homestead-Miami Speedway

Lewis competed and won in the Trans-Am series, where he drove for Robinson Racing.

Lewis currently races in the Creventic 24 hour series and the Nürburgring NLS.

== Racing record ==
=== 24 Hours of Le Mans results ===
Yea	Team	Co-Drivers	Car	Class	Laps	Pos.	Class Pos.
1999	(France) Riley & Scott Europe (France) Solution F	(Italy) Marco Apicella (Sweden) Carl Rosenblad	Riley & Scott Mk III/2	LMP	67	42nd	DNF
2000	(United States) Michael Colucci Racing	(United States) Cort Wagner (United States) Bob Mazzuoccola	Porsche 911 GT3-R	GT	22	46th	DNF
2003	(United States) Risi Competizione	(United States) Butch Leitzinger (United Kingdom) Johnny Mowlem	Ferrari 360 Modena Challenge	GT	138	39th	DNF

=== Complete WeatherTech SportsCar Championship results ===
(key)(Races in bold indicate pole position, Results are overall/class)

Year	Team	Class	Make	Engine	1	2	3	4	5	6	7	8	9	10	11	12	Rank	Points
2014	Alex Job Racing	GTD	Porsche 911 GT America	Porsche 4.0L Flat-6	DAY; 8	SEB	LGA	BEL	WGL	MOS	IMS	ELK	VIR	AUS	PET		65th	26
2014	Turner Motorsport	GTD	BMW Z4 GT3	BMW 4.4 L V8 V8	DAY	SEB; 7	LGA	BEL	WGL	MOS	IMS	ELK	VIR	AUS	PET		65th	26
2015	RG Racing	P	Riley Mk XXVI DP	Dinan (BMW) 5.0 L V8	DAY; 6	SIR	LBH	LGA	DET	WGL	MSP	ELK	COA	PET			27th	26
2021	Gilbert Korthoff Motorsports	GTD	Mercedes-AMG GT3 Evo	Mercedes-AMG M159 6.2 L V8	DAY	SEB	MOH	DET	WGL	WGL; 7	LIM	ELK; 14	LGA	LBH	VIR	PET	70th	186

==== 24 Hours of Daytona results ====
Year	Team	Co-drivers	Car	Class	Laps	Pos.	Class Pos.
1998	(United States) Mosler Automotive	(United States) Vic Rice (United States) Brian Hornkohl (United States) Chris Neville	Mosler Raptor	GT1	169	61st	DNF
1999	(United States) T. C. Klein Racing	(United States) Randy Pobst (United States) Bob Mazzuoccola (United States) Mark Raccaro	BMW M3	GT3	622	13th	5th
2000	(United States) MCR/Aspen Knolls	(United States) Bob Mazzuoccola (United States) Mike Bavaro (United States) Cort Wagner	Porsche 996 GT3-R	GTU	540	30th	DNF
2001	(United States) Pilbeam Racing America	(Belgium) Bruno Lambert (Switzerland) Toni Seiler	Pilbeam MP84	SRPII	216	58th	DNF
2002	(United States) ACP Motorsports	(United States) Kerry Hitt (United States) Jim Briody (United States) Owen Trinkler	Chevrolet Corvette	AGT	287	53rd	DNF
2004	(United States) Southard Motorsports	(United States) George Robinson (United States) Jack Baldwin (United States) Vic Rice (United States) Stephen Southard	Fabcar FDSC/03	DP	359	40th	DNF
2005	(United States) Cegwa Sport/Southard Motorsports	(Poland) Darius Grala (United States) Mark Patterson (United States) Quentin Wahl (United States) Bohdan Kroczek	Fabcar FDSC/03	DP	630	23rd	14th
2006	(United States) Southard Motorsports	(United States) Kris Szekeres (United States) Randy LaJoie (Canada) Tony Burgess	Riley Mk XI	DP	548	38th	19th
2007	(United States) Southard Motorsports	(United States) Randy Ruhlman (United States) Graham Rahal (United States) Elliot Forbes-Robinson	Riley Mk XI	DP	214	62nd	DNF
2008	(United States) Southard Motorsports	(United States) Bill Lester (United States) Ted Christopher (United States) Alex Barron	Riley Mk XI	DP	527	42nd	DNF
2009	(United States) Gotham Competition	(United States) Jerome Jacalone (United States) Joe Jacalone (United States) Randy Pobst (Puerto Rico) Gerardo Bonilla	Porsche 997 GT3 Cup	GT	675	18th	10th
2010	(United States) Autohaus Motorsports	(United States) Peter Collins (France) Romain Iannetta (United States) Richard Zahn	Pontiac GXP.R	GT	125	40th	DNF
2011	(United States) Chris Smith Racing	(United States) Bill Sweedler (United States) Tom Sheehan (United States) Mitch Pagerey	Porsche 997 GT3 Cup	GT	495	35th	19th
2012	(United States) Orbit/GMG	(France) Nicolas Armindo (United States) Bret Curtis (United States) James Sofronas (United States) Lance Wilsey	Porsche 997 GT3 Cup	GT	713	22nd	11th
2013	(United States) Napleton Racing	(Venezuela) Nelson Canache Jr. (United States) David Donohue (United States) Jim Norman	Porsche Cayman S	GX	635	26th	**1st**
2014	(United States) Alex Job Racing	(United States) Cooper MacNeil (United States) Leh Keen (Canada) Louis-Philippe Dumoulin (New Zealand) Shane van Gisbergen	Porsche 911 GT America	GTD	656	26th	8th
2015	(United States) RG Racing	(United States) Robert Gewirtz (United States) Mark Kvamme (China) David Cheng	Riley MkXXVI	P	644	24th	7th

=== NASCAR ===
(key) (Bold – Pole position awarded by qualifying time. Italics – Pole position earned by points standings or practice time. * – Most laps led.)

==== Winston Cup Series ====
Winston Cup Series results
Year	Team	No.	Make	1	2	3	4	5	6	7	8	9	10	11	12	13	14	15	16	17	18	19	20	21	22	23	24	25	26	27	28	29	30	31	32	33	34	35	36	NWCC	Pts	Ref
2002	Otto Motorsports	09	Ford	DAY	CAR	LVS	ATL	DAR	BRI	TEX	MAR	TAL	CAL	RCH	CLT	DOV	POC	MCH	SON	DAY	CHI	NHA	POC	IND	GLN; DNQ	MCH	BRI	DAR	RCH	NHA	DOV	KAN	TAL	CLT	MAR	ATL	CAR	PHO	HOM	NA	-	

=== American open–wheel racing results ===
(key)

==== Indy Lights ====
Year	Team	1	2	3	4	5	6	7	8	9	10	11	12	13	14	15	16	Rank	Points
2007	Michael Crawford Motorsports	HMS; 20	STP1	STP2	INDY	MIL	IMS1	IMS2	IOW	WGL1	WGL2	NSH	MOH	KTY	SNM1	SNM2	CHI	42nd	10
