= Philippe Haezebrouck =

French racing driver

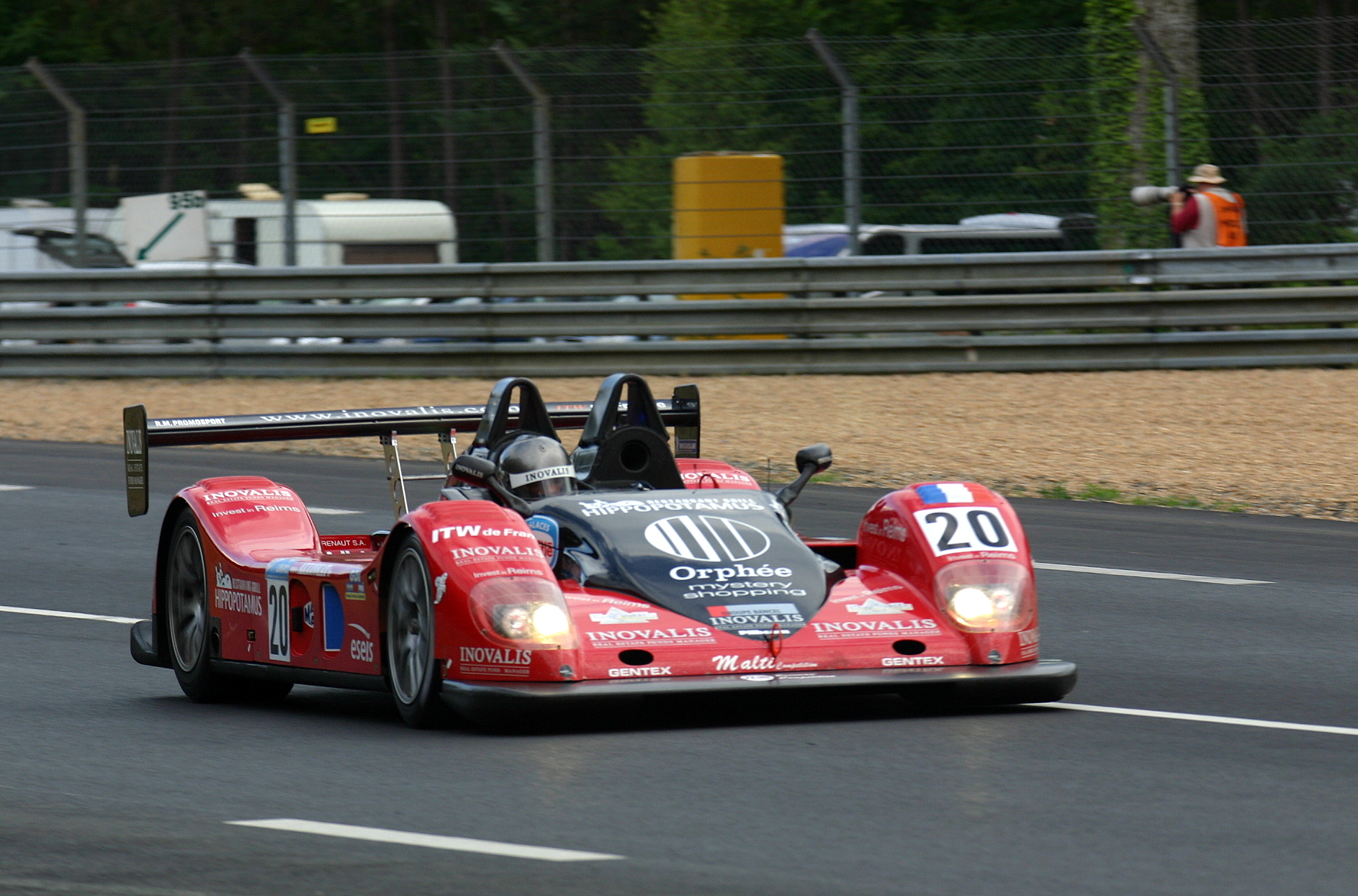
- Haezebrouck at the 2005 24 Hours of Le Mans
- Nationality: (France) French
- Born: 7 November 1954 (age 72) Reims, France

Formula Renault 2.0 NEC career
- Current team: Formula Motorsport
- Categorisation: FIA Silver (until 2013); FIA Bronze (2014–)
- Car number: 94

Philippe Haezebrouck (born 7 November 1954), also known by his pseudonym "Steve Brooks", is a French racing driver from Reims.

== Racing record ==
=== Career summary ===
Season	Series	Team	Races	Wins	Poles	F/Laps	Podiums	Points	Position
1981	French Touring Car Championship		?	0	0	0	0	29	19th
1982	French Touring Car Championship		?	0	0	0	0	3	27th
1987	Porsche 944 Turbo Cup France		1	0	0	0	0	0	NC
1987	World Touring Car Championship	Bavaria Automobiles	1	0	0	0	0	0	NC
1988	European Touring Car Championship	Bavaria Automobiles	1	0	0	0	0	0	NC
2000	Belgian Procar	Ecurie Le Perron	1	0	0	0	0	0	NC
2001	FIA GT Championship - NGT	Freisinger Motorsport	1	0	0	0	0	6	25th
2001	24 Hours of Le Mans - GT	Freisinger Motorsport	1	0	0	0	1	N/A	**2nd**
2002	Grand American Rolex Series - GT	Freisinger Motorsport	1	0	0	0	0	0	NC
2002	Formula Ford France	Promodrive	?	0	0	0	0	0	NC
2004	Le Mans Endurance Series - LMP2	G-Force Racing	2	0	0	0	0	5	19th
2005	French GT Championship	Force One	2	0	0	0	0	1	39th
2005	Le Mans Endurance Series - LMP2	Pir Compétition	1	0	0	0	0	0	NC
2005	24 Hours of Le Mans - LMP2	Pir Compétition	1	0	0	0	0	N/A	DNF
2006	V de V Challenge Endurance Moderne - Proto	Promodrive	?	0	0	0	0	45	19th
2006	24 Hours of Nürburgring - SP6	MSC Rhön	1	0	?	?	0	N/A	4th
2007	V de V Challenge Endurance Moderne - Proto	Promodrive	8	0	0	0	0	11.25	58th
2008	V de V Endurance VHC		2	0	0	0	1	75	22nd
2008	V de V Challenge Endurance Moderne - Proto	LD Autosport	8	1	0	0	5	166.5	**2nd**
2008	24 Hours of Nürburgring - SP7	Peter Schmidt	1	0	0	0	0	N/A	DNF
2009	V de V Challenge Endurance Moderne - Proto	LD Autosport	8	0	0	0	2	94	9th
2009	Formula Le Mans Cup	Applewood - LD Autosport	5	0	0	0	0	9	19th
2010	V de V Challenge Endurance Moderne - Proto	Blue One	8	0	0	0	1	76	10th
2010	Single-seater V de V Challenge	Equipe Palmyr	12	1	0	2	5	452	**1st**
2011	V de V Challenge Endurance Moderne - Proto	LD Autosport	7	0	0	0	1	51.5	17th
2011	Blancpain Endurance Series - GT3 Pro-Am Cup	Graff Racing	1	0	0	0	0	8	21st
2011	24 Hours of Le Mans - LMP2	Extrême Limite AM Paris	1	0	0	0	0	N/A	NC
2011	Single-seater V de V Challenge	Formula Motorsport	18	0	0	0	7	371	4th
2011	Speed EuroSeries		2	0	0	0	2	26	22nd
2012	V de V Challenge Endurance Moderne - Proto	LD Autosport	3	0	0	0	0	22.5	32nd
2012	24 Hours of Le Mans - LMP2	Extrême Limite AM Paris	1	0	0	0	0	N/A	12th
2012	FIA World Endurance Championship - LMP2	Extrême Limite AM Paris	2	0	0	0	0	0	NC
2012	BOSS GP - Masters class	R.D.A./Ryschka Motorsport	6	2	6	1	2	90	**3rd**
2012	Single-seater V de V Challenge	Formula Motorsport	3	0	0	0	0	72	28th
2013	FIA World Endurance Championship - LMP2	Gulf Racing Middle East	1	0	0	0	0	0	NC
2013	24 Hours of Le Mans - LMP2	Gulf Racing Middle East	1	0	0	0	0	N/A	DNF
2013	BOSS GP - Formula class	Signature	4	0	0	0	0	0	NC
2014	BOSS GP - Open	Signature	11	0	0	0	0	150	5th
2014	Blancpain Endurance Series - Gentlemen Trophy	Saintéloc Racing	1	0	0	0	0	12	23rd
2014	24 Hours of Nürburgring - SP7	GetSpeed Performance	1	0	?	?	0	N/A	6th
2015	BOSS GP - Masters class	Reims Developpement Automobile	4	0	0	0	2	74	5th
2015	BOSS GP - Open	Zele Racing	4	0	0	0	2	76	4th
2015	Blancpain Endurance Series - Am	Saintéloc Racing	1	0	0	0	0	2	24th
2015	Renault Sport Trophy - Prestige	Zele Racing	2	0	0	0	0	7	16th
2015	Renault Sport Trophy - Endurance	Zele Racing	2	0	0	0	0	10	19th
2015	24 Hours of Nürburgring - SP-Pro	Kremer Racing	1	0	?	?	1	N/A	**2nd**
2016	Formula Renault 2.0 NEC	Formula Motorsport	4	0	0	0	0	6	29th
2016	Formula Renault 2.0 NEC	Inter Europol Competition	3	0	0	0	0	6	29th
2016	BOSS GP - Formula class	Inter Europol Competition	6	0	0	0	4	108	6th
2016	V de V Challenge Endurance Moderne - Proto	CD Sport	6	0	0	0	0	42.5	23rd
2016	Renault Sport Trophy - Am	R-ace GP	3	0	0	0	0	0	NC†
2016	Renault Sport Trophy - Endurance	R-ace GP	2	0	0	0	0	0	NC†
2016	24 Hours of Nürburgring - SP7	Kremer Racing	1	0	0	0	1	N/A	**3rd**
2017	24H Proto Series - P2	Simpson Motorsport	?	?	?	?	?	?	?
2017	24H Proto Series - P2	Atech - DXB	?	?	?	?	?	?	?
2019	Ultimate Cup Series - Monoplace	Formula Motorsport	6	0	0	0	0	21	24th
2019	BOSS GP - Formula class	Inter Europol Competition	4	0	0	0	0	177	4th
2019	BOSS GP - Formula class	Speed Center	8	0	0	0	0	177	4th
2019	Blancpain GT Series Endurance Cup	3Y Technology	1	0	0	0	0	0	NC
2019	French GT4 Cup - Am	3Y Technology	4	0	0	0	0	3	28th
2019	GT Cup Open Europe	Mirage Racing	2	0	0	0	0	0	33rd
2020	Porsche Carrera Cup France	CLRT	2	0	0	0	0	0	NC
2020	Porsche Supercup	CLRT	4	0	0	0	0	0	23rd
2020	Le Mans Cup - LMP3	Team Virage	1	0	0	0	0	0	NC
2020	24 Hours of Le Mans - GTE Am	Team Project 1	1	0	0	0	0	N/A	16th
2020	24 Hours of Nürburgring - Cup 3	Team Mathol Racing e.V.	1	0	0	0	0	N/A	4th
2021	Supercar Challenge - GT	Domec Racing	6	0	0	0	0	40	13th
2021	Italian Sport Prototype Championship	Luxury Car Racing	12	0	0	0	0	0	NC
2021	24H GT Series - GTX	Vortex V8	1	0	0	0	1	16	19th
2022	Ligier European Series - JS P4	Les Deux Arbres	2	0	0	0	0	8	21st
2022	Supercar Challenge - GT	Domec Racing	10	0	0	0	0	76	9th
2022	Ultimate Cup Series - Group CN	Wolf Racing France	2	0	0	0	0	0	NC
2022	Italian Prototype Championship	Luxury Car Racing	8	0	0	0	0	0	23rd
2022	24 Hours of Nürburgring - Cup 5	Adrenalin Motorsport Team Alzner Automotive	1	0	0	0	1	N/A	**2nd**

† As Haezebrouck was a guest driver, he was ineligible to score points.

=== Complete FIA GT Championship results ===
(key) (Races in bold indicate pole position) (Races in italics indicate fastest lap)

Year	Team	Car	Class	1	2	3	4	5	6	7	8	9	10	11	Pos.	Pts
2001	Freisinger Motorsport	Porsche 911 GT3-RS	GT	MNZ	BRN	MAG	SIL	ZOL	HUN	SPA; 4	A1R	NÜR	JAR	EST	27th	6

=== Complete 24 Hours of Le Mans results ===
(key) (Races in bold indicate pole position) (Races in italics indicate fastest lap)

Year	Team	Co-Drivers	Car	Class	Laps	Pos.	Class Pos.
2001	(Germany) Freisinger Motorsport	(France) Romain Dumas (United States) Gunnar Jeannette	Porsche 911 GT3-RS	GT	282	7th	**2nd**
2005	(France) Pir Competition	(France) Pierre Bruneau (France) Marc Rostan	Pilbeam MP93-JPX	LMP2	32	DNF	DNF
2011	(France) Extrême Limite AM Paris	(France) Fabien Rosier (France) Jean-René De Fournoux	Norma MP200P-Judd-BMW	LMP2	247	NC	NC
2012	(France) Extrême Limite ARIC	(France) Fabien Rosier (France) Philippe Thirion	Norma MP200P-Judd	LMP2	308	29th	12th
2013	(United Arab Emirates) Gulf Racing Middle East	(France) Fabien Giroix (Japan) Keiko Ihara	Lola B12/80-Nissan	LMP2	22	DNF	DNF
2020	(Germany) Team Project 1	(Greece) Andreas Laskaratos (France) Julien Piguet	Porsche 911 RSR	GTE; Am	313	43rd	16th

=== 24 Hours of Daytona ===
(key) (Races in bold indicate pole position) (Races in italics indicate fastest lap)

Year	Team	Co-Drivers	Car	Class	Laps	Pos.	Class Pos.
2002	(Germany) Freisinger Motorsport	(United States) Robert Orcutt (United States) Ross Bleustein (United Kingdom) Rob Croydon	Porsche 996 GT3-RS	GT	579	24th	13th

=== Complete Formula Renault 2.0 NEC results ===
(key) (Races in bold indicate pole position) (Races in italics indicate fastest lap)

Year	Entrant	1	2	3	4	5	6	7	8	9	10	11	12	13	14	15	DC	Points
2016	Formula Motorsport	MNZ; 1	MNZ; 2	SIL; 1	SIL; 2	HUN; 1	HUN; 2	SPA; 1; 23	SPA; 2; 27	ASS; 1; 23	ASS; 2; 24	NÜR; 1	NÜR; 2				29th	6
2016	Inter Europol Competition													HOC; 1; 17	HOC; 2; 20	HOC; 3; 20	29th	6
