= André Ahrlé =

German racing driver (born 1961)

André Michael Ahrlé (born July 27, 1961) is a German former racing driver and entrepreneur. Ahrlé won the 24 Hours of Daytona twice in 1997 in the GTS-2 class and 1999 in the GT2 class. Ahrlé participated in four 24 Hours of Le Mans from 1996 to 1999 with a best overall finish of tenth.

== Career ==
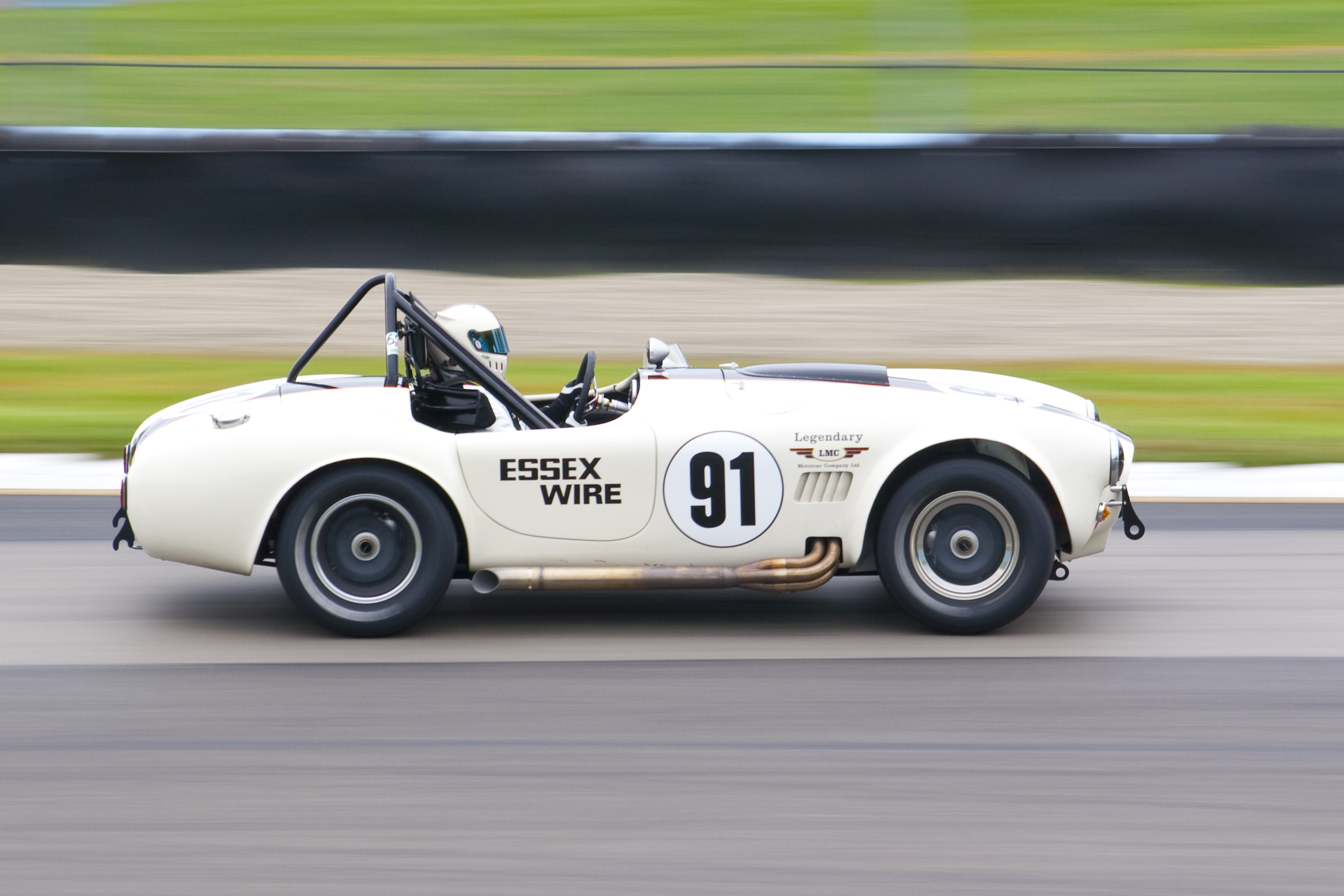
Ahrlé driving a 1965 Shelby Cobra in 2009

Ahrlé was active in GT and sports car racing between 1993 and 2002. His career began in 1993 in the Porsche Carrera Cup Germany and finished the season 13th overall. In 1995, he finished ninth overall in the Porsche Supercup and made his debut at the 1996 24 Hours of Le Mans. He drove a Porsche 911 GT2 for the French racing team Larbre Compétition with teammates Patrick Bourdais and Patrice Goueslard. The trio finished sixth place in the GT2 class and 20th place overall. Ahrlé competed in the 24 Hours of Le Mans four times before retiring from racing. His best overall finish came in 1997, when he finished second in the GT2 class and tenth together with Bruno Eichmann and Andy Pilgrim.

Ahrlé's greatest international success was winning the GT2 class at the 1997 24 Hours of Daytona, again in a Porsche 911 GT2, this time entered by Roock Racing. Ahrlé was part of a four-person team that included Claudia Hürtgen, Patrice Goueslard, and Ralf Kelleners. The quartet finished fourth overall. Ahrlé won the GT2 class in the 1999 24 Hours of Daytona with Roock Racing.

At the beginning of the 2000s, Ahrlé still drove some races in the FIA GT Championship and the American Le Mans Series, and retired from professional racing after the end of the 2002 season.

Ahrlé has participated in vintage racing since 2008, driving a 1965 Shelby Cobra.

== Other ventures ==
Ahrlé was a co-founder of Special Security Services GmbH, a company that provided security services for concerts and sporting events. In 1999, Ahrlé and his partners sold the company to Deutsche Entertainment.

Ahrlé is the chief executive officer of Tetre Rouge Assets, an investment company for vintage racing cars.

== Racing record ==
=== Complete 24 Hours of Le Mans results ===
Year	Team	Co-Drivers	Car	Class	Laps	Pos.	Class Pos.
1996	(France) Larbre Compétition	(France) Patrice Goueslard (France) Patrick Bourdais	Porsche 911 GT2	GT2	284	20th	6th
1997	(Germany) Roock Racing	(Switzerland) Bruno Eichmann (United States) Andy Pilgrim	Porsche 911 GT2	GT2	306	10th	2nd
1998	(Germany) Roock Racing	(United Kingdom) Rob Schirle (United Kingdom) David Warnock	Porsche 911 GT2	GT2	247	22nd	8th
1999	(Germany) Roock Racing	(Germany) Claudia Hürtgen (Belgium) Vincent Vosse	Porsche 911 GT2	GTS	290	20th	8th

=== Complete 24 Hours of Daytona results ===
Year	Team	Co-Drivers	Car	Class	Laps	Pos.	Class Pos.
1996	(France) Larbre Competition	(Czech Republic) Karel Dolejsi (Germany) Bernd Netzeband (Brazil) Andre Lara-Resende	Porsche 911 GT2 Evo	GTS-1	281	DNF	DNF
1997	(Germany) Roock Racing	(France) Patrice Goueslard (Germany) Claudia Hürtgen (Germany) Ralf Kelleners	Porsche 911 GT2	GTS-1	665	4th	1st
1998	(France) Larbre Competition	(France) Christophe Bouchut (France) Patrice Goueslard (Sweden) Carl Rosenblad	Porsche 911 GT1	GT1	667	3rd	2nd
1999	(Germany) Roock Racing	(Germany) Herbert Haupt (Italy) Raffaele Sangiuolo (United Kingdom) David Warnock	Porsche 911 GT2	GT2	634	7th	1st
2000	(France) Larbre Competition	(France) Christophe Bouchut (France) Jean-Luc Chéreau (France) Patrice Goueslard	Porsche 911 GT3-R	GTU	597	DNF	DNF
2002	(Germany) RWS Motorsport	(Austria) Horst Felbermayr (Austria) Horst Felbermayr Jr. (United Kingdom) Paul Knapfield	Porsche 996 GT3-R	GT	335	DNF	DNF
