= 2002 24 Hours of Daytona =

Motor race in Florida, USA

Previous: 2001	Next: 2003
Index: Races | Winners

Track map of Daytona International Speedway

The 2002 Rolex 24 at Daytona was a Grand-Am Rolex Sports Car Series 24-hour endurance sports car race held on February 2–3, 2002 at the Daytona International Speedway road course. The race served as the first round of the 2002 Rolex Sports Car Series. The overall winner and winner of the SRP class was the No. 27 Doran Lista Racing Dallara SP1 driven by Didier Theys, Fredy Lienhart, Max Papis, and Mauro Baldi. The SRP II class was won by the No. 8 Rand Racing/Risi Competizione Lola B2K/40 driven by Anthony Lazzaro, Bill Rand, Terry Borcheller, and Ralf Kelleners. The GTS class was won by the No. 3 Rocketsports Racing Jaguar XKR driven by Paul Gentilozzi, Scott Pruett, Michael Lauer, and Brian Simo. The GT category was won by the No. 66 The Racer's Group Porsche 996 GT3-RS driven by Kevin Buckler, Michael Schrom, Jörg Bergmeister, and Timo Bernhard. Finally, the AGT category was won by the No. 09 Flis Racing Chevrolet Corvette driven by Craig Conway, Doug Goad, Andy Pilgrim, and Mike Ciasulli.

== Race results ==
Class winners in bold.

Pos	Class	No	Team	Drivers	Chassis	Tire	Laps
Pos	Class	No	Team	Drivers	Engine	Tire	Laps
1	**SRP**	**27**	**(United States) Doran Lista Racing**	**(Belgium) Didier Theys (Switzerland) Fredy Lienhard (Italy) Max Papis (Italy) Mauro Baldi**	**Dallara SP1**	G	**716**
1	**SRP**	**27**	**(United States) Doran Lista Racing**	**(Belgium) Didier Theys (Switzerland) Fredy Lienhard (Italy) Max Papis (Italy) Mauro Baldi**	**Judd 4.0 L V10**	G	**716**
2	SRP	36	(United States) Jim Matthews Racing	(United Kingdom) Guy Smith (United States) Scott Sharp (United States) Robby Gordon (United States) Jim Matthews	Riley & Scott Mk III C	G	710
2	SRP	36	(United States) Jim Matthews Racing	(United Kingdom) Guy Smith (United States) Scott Sharp (United States) Robby Gordon (United States) Jim Matthews	Élan 6.0 L V8	G	710
3	**SRP II**	**8**	**(United States) Rand Racing/Risi Competizione**	**(United States) Anthony Lazzaro (United States) Bill Rand (United States) Terry Borcheller (Germany) Ralf Kelleners**	**Lola B2K/40**	D	**695**
3	**SRP II**	**8**	**(United States) Rand Racing/Risi Competizione**	**(United States) Anthony Lazzaro (United States) Bill Rand (United States) Terry Borcheller (Germany) Ralf Kelleners**	**Nissan 3.0 L V6**	D	**695**
4	SRP	38	(United States) Champion Racing	(United Kingdom) Andy Wallace (Germany) Sascha Maassen (United States) Hurley Haywood (Germany) Lucas Luhr	Lola B2K/10	G	681
4	SRP	38	(United States) Champion Racing	(United Kingdom) Andy Wallace (Germany) Sascha Maassen (United States) Hurley Haywood (Germany) Lucas Luhr	Porsche 3.6 L Turbo Flat-6	G	681
5	**GTS**	**3**	**(United States) Rocketsports Racing**	**(United States) Paul Gentilozzi (United States) Scott Pruett (Germany) Michael Lauer (United States) Brian Simo**	**Jaguar XKR**	G	**675**
5	**GTS**	**3**	**(United States) Rocketsports Racing**	**(United States) Paul Gentilozzi (United States) Scott Pruett (Germany) Michael Lauer (United States) Brian Simo**	**Ford 6.3 L V8**	G	**675**
6	SRP II	22	(United States) Archangel Motorsport Services	(United States) Chad Block (United States) Steven Knight (United States) Brian DeVries (United States) Mel Hawkins	Lola B2K/40	D	670
6	SRP II	22	(United States) Archangel Motorsport Services	(United States) Chad Block (United States) Steven Knight (United States) Brian DeVries (United States) Mel Hawkins	Nissan 3.0 L V6	D	670
7	**GT**	**66**	**(United States) The Racer's Group**	**(United States) Kevin Buckler (United States) Michael Schrom (Germany) Jörg Bergmeister (Germany) Timo Bernhard**	**Porsche 996 GT3-RS**	D	**669**
7	**GT**	**66**	**(United States) The Racer's Group**	**(United States) Kevin Buckler (United States) Michael Schrom (Germany) Jörg Bergmeister (Germany) Timo Bernhard**	**Porsche 3.6 L Flat-6**	D	**669**
8	GTS	77	(France) Larbre Compétition	(France) Christophe Bouchut (France) Patrice Goueslard (France) Jean-Luc Chéreau (Sweden) Carl Rosenblad	Chrysler Viper GTS-R	G	665
8	GTS	77	(France) Larbre Compétition	(France) Christophe Bouchut (France) Patrice Goueslard (France) Jean-Luc Chéreau (Sweden) Carl Rosenblad	Chrysler 8.0 L V10	G	665
9	GT	44	(United States) Orbit Racing	(United States) Gary Schultheis (United States) Tony Kester (Canada) Sylvain Tremblay (United States) Selby Wellman	Porsche 996 GT3-RS	D	664
9	GT	44	(United States) Orbit Racing	(United States) Gary Schultheis (United States) Tony Kester (Canada) Sylvain Tremblay (United States) Selby Wellman	Porsche 3.6 L Flat-6	D	664
10	GT	86	(Germany) Freisinger Motorsport	(Portugal) Ni Amorim (France) Romain Dumas (Monaco) Stéphane Ortelli (Germany) Hans Fertl	Porsche 996 GT3-RS	D	661
10	GT	86	(Germany) Freisinger Motorsport	(Portugal) Ni Amorim (France) Romain Dumas (Monaco) Stéphane Ortelli (Germany) Hans Fertl	Porsche 3.6 L Flat-6	D	661
11	GT	68	(United States) The Racer's Group	(United Kingdom) Robert Nearn (United States) Robert Nagel (United States) B. J. Zacharias (United States) Larry Schumacher	Porsche 996 GT3-R	D	657
11	GT	68	(United States) The Racer's Group	(United Kingdom) Robert Nearn (United States) Robert Nagel (United States) B. J. Zacharias (United States) Larry Schumacher	Porsche 3.6 L Flat-6	D	657
12	SRP	63	(United States) Downing/Atlanta Racing	(United States) Charlie Nearburg (United States) Chris Ronson (United States) John Lloyd (United States) Jim Downing	Kudzu DLY	G	654
12	SRP	63	(United States) Downing/Atlanta Racing	(United States) Charlie Nearburg (United States) Chris Ronson (United States) John Lloyd (United States) Jim Downing	Mazda 4-Rotor	G	654
13	GT	24	(France) Perspective Racing	(Portugal) João Barbosa (Belgium) Michel Neugarten (France) Thierry Perrier	Mosler MT900 R	D	653
13	GT	24	(France) Perspective Racing	(Portugal) João Barbosa (Belgium) Michel Neugarten (France) Thierry Perrier	Chevrolet 5.7 L V8	D	653
14	GT	40	(United States) Alegra Motorsports/901 Shop	(United States) Brady Refenning (United States) Catersby Jones (United States) Jake Vargo (United States) Carlos de Quesada	BMW M3 E46	D	649
14	GT	40	(United States) Alegra Motorsports/901 Shop	(United States) Brady Refenning (United States) Catersby Jones (United States) Jake Vargo (United States) Carlos de Quesada	BMW 3.2 L I6	D	649
15	GT	43	(United States) Orbit Racing	(United States) Peter Baron (United States) Kyle Petty (United States) Mike Borkowski (United States) Leo Hindery	Porsche 996 GT3-RS	D	641
15	GT	43	(United States) Orbit Racing	(United States) Peter Baron (United States) Kyle Petty (United States) Mike Borkowski (United States) Leo Hindery	Porsche 3.6 L Flat-6	D	641
16	GT	57	(Germany) Seikel Motorsport	(United States) Hugh Plumb (Canada) Tony Burgess (United States) Philip Collin (Canada) David Shep	Porsche 996 GT3-RS	D	641
16	GT	57	(Germany) Seikel Motorsport	(United States) Hugh Plumb (Canada) Tony Burgess (United States) Philip Collin (Canada) David Shep	Porsche 3.6 L Flat-6	D	641
17	GTS	31	(Germany) Konrad Motorsport	(United States) Charles Slater (Switzerland) Toni Seiler (United Kingdom) Martin Short (United States) Gunnar Jeannette	Saleen S7-R	G	634
17	GTS	31	(Germany) Konrad Motorsport	(United States) Charles Slater (Switzerland) Toni Seiler (United Kingdom) Martin Short (United States) Gunnar Jeannette	Ford 6.9 L V8	G	634
18	GT	67	(United States) The Racer's Group	(United States) Jim Michaelian (Italy) Ludovico Manfredi (United Kingdom) Paul Daniels (United States) Matt Talbert	Porsche 996 GT3-RS	D	618
18	GT	67	(United States) The Racer's Group	(United States) Jim Michaelian (Italy) Ludovico Manfredi (United Kingdom) Paul Daniels (United States) Matt Talbert	Porsche 3.6 L Flat-6	D	618
19	GT	35	(United States) ZIP Racing	(United States) Gerry Green (United States) R. J. Valentine (United States) Jim Walsh (United States) Rick Dilorio	Porsche 996 GT3-R	D	608
19	GT	35	(United States) ZIP Racing	(United States) Gerry Green (United States) R. J. Valentine (United States) Jim Walsh (United States) Rick Dilorio	Porsche 3.6 L Flat-6	D	608
20	GT	04	(United States) Marcos Racing International USA	(Belgium) Stéphane De Groodt (Netherlands) Peter van der Kolk (Netherlands) Pim van Riet (United States) Cougar Jacobsen	Marcos Mantis Plus	D	598
20	GT	04	(United States) Marcos Racing International USA	(Belgium) Stéphane De Groodt (Netherlands) Peter van der Kolk (Netherlands) Pim van Riet (United States) Cougar Jacobsen	Ford 4.6 L V8	D	598
21	GT	72	(United States) Jack Lewis Enterprises Ltd.	(United States) David Murry (United States) Jack Lewis (United States) Keith Fisher (United States) Tom McGlynn	Porsche 996 GT3 Cup	D	592
21	GT	72	(United States) Jack Lewis Enterprises Ltd.	(United States) David Murry (United States) Jack Lewis (United States) Keith Fisher (United States) Tom McGlynn	Porsche 3.6 L Flat-6	D	592
22	**AGT**	**09**	**(United States) Flis Racing**	**(United States) Craig Conway (United States) Doug Goad (United States) Andy Pilgrim (United States) Mike Ciasulli**	**Chevrolet Corvette**	G	**591**
22	**AGT**	**09**	**(United States) Flis Racing**	**(United States) Craig Conway (United States) Doug Goad (United States) Andy Pilgrim (United States) Mike Ciasulli**	**Chevrolet 5.9 L V8**	G	**591**
23 DNF	SRP	37	(United States) Intersport Racing	(United States) Jon Field (United States) Duncan Dayton (United States) Mike Durand (United States) Rick Sutherland	Lola B2K/10	G	590
23 DNF	SRP	37	(United States) Intersport Racing	(United States) Jon Field (United States) Duncan Dayton (United States) Mike Durand (United States) Rick Sutherland	Judd 4.0 L V10	G	590
24	GT	85	(Germany) Freisinger Motorsport	(United States) Robert Orcutt (United States) Ross Bleustein (United Kingdom) Rob Croydon (France) Philippe Haezebrouck	Porsche 996 GT3-RS	D	579
24	GT	85	(Germany) Freisinger Motorsport	(United States) Robert Orcutt (United States) Ross Bleustein (United Kingdom) Rob Croydon (France) Philippe Haezebrouck	Porsche 3.6 L Flat-6	D	579
25	GT	33	(United States) Scuderia Ferrari of Washington	(United States) Cort Wagner (United States) Bill Auberlen (Italy) Constantino Bertuzzi (United States) Derrike Cope	Ferrari 360 Modena	D	572
25	GT	33	(United States) Scuderia Ferrari of Washington	(United States) Cort Wagner (United States) Bill Auberlen (Italy) Constantino Bertuzzi (United States) Derrike Cope	Ferrari 3.6 L V8	D	572
26	GT	98	(Italy) MAC Racing	(France) Pierre Bes (France) Marco Saviozzi (United States) Kurt Thiel (France) David Terrien	Porsche 996 GT3-R	D	569
26	GT	98	(Italy) MAC Racing	(France) Pierre Bes (France) Marco Saviozzi (United States) Kurt Thiel (France) David Terrien	Porsche 3.6 L Flat-6	D	569
27 DNF	GT	96	(Italy) Mastercar SRL	(Italy) Andrea Montermini (Italy) Vincenzo Polli (Italy) Franco Bertoli (Russia) Sergey Zlobin	Ferrari 360 Modena GT	D	551
27 DNF	GT	96	(Italy) Mastercar SRL	(Italy) Andrea Montermini (Italy) Vincenzo Polli (Italy) Franco Bertoli (Russia) Sergey Zlobin	Ferrari 3.6 L V8	D	551
28	GT	10	(United States) Genesis	(United States) Todd Snyder (United States) Rick Fairbanks (United States) Nick Longhi (United States) Emil Assentato	BMW M3 E46	D	547
28	GT	10	(United States) Genesis	(United States) Todd Snyder (United States) Rick Fairbanks (United States) Nick Longhi (United States) Emil Assentato	BMW 3.2 L I6	D	547
29	SRP II	62	(United States) Team Spencer Motorsports	(United States) Dennis Spencer (United States) Barry Waddell (United States) Ryan Hampton (United States) Rich Grupp	Kudzu DLM/FW	D	533
29	SRP II	62	(United States) Team Spencer Motorsports	(United States) Dennis Spencer (United States) Barry Waddell (United States) Ryan Hampton (United States) Rich Grupp	Mazda 3-Rotor	D	533
30	GTS	42	(United States) Team Greeneman	(Republic of Ireland) Tommy Byrne (United States) Pete Peterson (United States) Stephen Earle (United States) Richard Millman	Porsche 996 GT3-RS	G	510
30	GTS	42	(United States) Team Greeneman	(Republic of Ireland) Tommy Byrne (United States) Pete Peterson (United States) Stephen Earle (United States) Richard Millman	Porsche 3.6 L Flat-6	G	510
31	GT	73	(United Kingdom) Team Eurotech	(United Kingdom) Mike Jordan (United Kingdom) Mark Sumpter (United Kingdom) Graeme Langford (United Kingdom) David Warnock	Porsche 996 GT3-R	D	503
31	GT	73	(United Kingdom) Team Eurotech	(United Kingdom) Mike Jordan (United Kingdom) Mark Sumpter (United Kingdom) Graeme Langford (United Kingdom) David Warnock	Porsche 3.6 L Flat-6	D	503
32 DNF	GTS	00	(Canada) Bytzek Motorsports	(Canada) David Empringham (Canada) Klaus Bytzek (Canada) Richard Spenard (Canada) James Holtom	Porsche 911 GT1 Evo	G	499
32 DNF	GTS	00	(Canada) Bytzek Motorsports	(Canada) David Empringham (Canada) Klaus Bytzek (Canada) Richard Spenard (Canada) James Holtom	Porsche 3.6 L Turbo Flat-6	G	499
33 DNF	AGT	46	(United States) Morgan-Dollar Motorsports	(United States) Charles Morgan (United States) Rob Morgan (New Zealand) Andrew Richards (New Zealand) Stephen Richards	Chevrolet Corvette	G	493
33 DNF	AGT	46	(United States) Morgan-Dollar Motorsports	(United States) Charles Morgan (United States) Rob Morgan (New Zealand) Andrew Richards (New Zealand) Stephen Richards	Chevrolet 5.4 L V8	G	493
34	SRP	87	(United States) Sezio Florida Racing Team	(France) Patrice Roussel (France) Georges Forgeois (France) Edouard Sezionale (United States) John Mirro	Norma M2000-02	G	492
34	SRP	87	(United States) Sezio Florida Racing Team	(France) Patrice Roussel (France) Georges Forgeois (France) Edouard Sezionale (United States) John Mirro	Ford 6.0 L V8	G	492
35 DNF	SRP	30	(United States) Intersport Racing	(United States) Joel Field (United States) Larry Oberto (United States) Mark Neuhaus (United States) Clint Field	Lola B2K/10	G	462
35 DNF	SRP	30	(United States) Intersport Racing	(United States) Joel Field (United States) Larry Oberto (United States) Mark Neuhaus (United States) Clint Field	Judd 4.0 L V10	G	462
36 DNF	SRP	13	(United States) Risi Competizione	(Belgium) Eric van de Poele (Australia) David Brabham (Sweden) Stefan Johansson	Ferrari 333 SP	G	455
36 DNF	SRP	13	(United States) Risi Competizione	(Belgium) Eric van de Poele (Australia) David Brabham (Sweden) Stefan Johansson	Ferrari F310E 4.0 L V12	G	455
37	GTS	4	(United Kingdom) Brookspeed Racing	(United Kingdom) Grahame Bryant (United States) Norman Goldrich (United Kingdom) David Gooding (Finland) Kari Maenpaa	Chrysler Viper GTS-R	G	434
37	GTS	4	(United Kingdom) Brookspeed Racing	(United Kingdom) Grahame Bryant (United States) Norman Goldrich (United Kingdom) David Gooding (Finland) Kari Maenpaa	Chrysler 8.0 L V10	G	434
38 DNF	SRP	49	(United Kingdom) Team Ascari	(South Africa) Werner Lupberger (United States) T. J. Bell (Finland) Harri Toivonen	Ascari KZR-1	G	429
38 DNF	SRP	49	(United Kingdom) Team Ascari	(South Africa) Werner Lupberger (United States) T. J. Bell (Finland) Harri Toivonen	Judd 4.0 L V10	G	429
39	GTS	83	(United Kingdom) Graham Nash Motorsport	(United Kingdom) Ian McKellar (Brazil) Thomas Erdos (United States) Ron Johnson (United Kingdom) Bobby Verdon-Roe	Saleen S7-R	G	428
39	GTS	83	(United Kingdom) Graham Nash Motorsport	(United Kingdom) Ian McKellar (Brazil) Thomas Erdos (United States) Ron Johnson (United Kingdom) Bobby Verdon-Roe	Ford 6.9 L V8	G	428
40 DNF	AGT	82	(United States) Dick Greer Racing-Wendy's	(United States) Dick Greer (United States) Jack Willes (United States) Terry Linger (United States) John Finger	Chevrolet Corvette	G	424
40 DNF	AGT	82	(United States) Dick Greer Racing-Wendy's	(United States) Dick Greer (United States) Jack Willes (United States) Terry Linger (United States) John Finger	Chevrolet 5.9 L V8	G	424
41 DNF	GT	56	(Germany) Seikel Motorsport	(Italy) Luca Drudi (Italy) Gabrio Rosa (Italy) Fabio Rosa (Italy) Alex Caffi	Porsche 996 GT3-RS	D	420
41 DNF	GT	56	(Germany) Seikel Motorsport	(Italy) Luca Drudi (Italy) Gabrio Rosa (Italy) Fabio Rosa (Italy) Alex Caffi	Porsche 3.6 L Flat-6	D	420
42 DNF	GTS	7	(Germany) RWS Motorsport	(Italy) Luca Riccitelli (Austria) Dieter Quester (Belgium) Vincent Vosse (United States) Boris Said	Porsche 996 GT3-R	G	404
42 DNF	GTS	7	(Germany) RWS Motorsport	(Italy) Luca Riccitelli (Austria) Dieter Quester (Belgium) Vincent Vosse (United States) Boris Said	Porsche 3.6 L Flat-6	G	404
43	GTS	51	(United States) Team Seattle/Park Place Racing	(United States) Chris Bingham (United States) Peter MacLeod (United States) Wade Gaughran (United States) Vic Rice	Saleen S7-R	G	392
43	GTS	51	(United States) Team Seattle/Park Place Racing	(United States) Chris Bingham (United States) Peter MacLeod (United States) Wade Gaughran (United States) Vic Rice	Ford 6.9 L V8	G	392
44 DNF	SRP	20	(United States) Dyson Racing	(United States) Elliott Forbes-Robinson (United States) Rob Dyson (United States) Chris Dyson (United States) Dorsey Schroeder	Riley & Scott Mk III	G	379
44 DNF	SRP	20	(United States) Dyson Racing	(United States) Elliott Forbes-Robinson (United States) Rob Dyson (United States) Chris Dyson (United States) Dorsey Schroeder	Ford 6.0 L V8	G	379
45 DNF	GT	92	(Switzerland) Swiss GT Racing	(Italy) Mauro Casadei (Italy) Raffaele Sangiuolo (United States) Derek Clark (United States) Jay Wilton	Porsche 996 GT3-R	D	352
45 DNF	GT	92	(Switzerland) Swiss GT Racing	(Italy) Mauro Casadei (Italy) Raffaele Sangiuolo (United States) Derek Clark (United States) Jay Wilton	Porsche 3.6 L Flat-6	D	352
46 DNF	SRP	2	(United States) Crawford Racing	(Netherlands) Jan Lammers (United Kingdom) Johnny Mowlem (United States) Tony Stewart	Crawford SSC2K	G	346
46 DNF	SRP	2	(United States) Crawford Racing	(Netherlands) Jan Lammers (United Kingdom) Johnny Mowlem (United States) Tony Stewart	Judd 4.0 L V10	G	346
47 DNF	GT	79	(United States) J3 Racing	(United States) Mike Fitzgerald (United States) Justin Jackson (Puerto Rico) Manuel Matos (United Kingdom) Marino Franchitti	Porsche 996 GT3-RS	D	343
47 DNF	GT	79	(United States) J3 Racing	(United States) Mike Fitzgerald (United States) Justin Jackson (Puerto Rico) Manuel Matos (United Kingdom) Marino Franchitti	Porsche 3.6 L Flat-6	D	343
48 DNF	GT	9	(Germany) RWS Motorsport	(Austria) Horst Felbermayr (Austria) Horst Felbermayr Jr. (United Kingdom) Paul Knapfield (Germany) André Ahrlé	Porsche 996 GT3-R	D	335
48 DNF	GT	9	(Germany) RWS Motorsport	(Austria) Horst Felbermayr (Austria) Horst Felbermayr Jr. (United Kingdom) Paul Knapfield (Germany) André Ahrlé	Porsche 3.6 L Flat-6	D	335
49 DNF	GTS	08	(Netherlands) Marcos Racing International	(Netherlands) Cor Euser (United Kingdom) Calum Lockie (Netherlands) Duncan Huisman	Marcos Mantara LM600	G	330
49 DNF	GTS	08	(Netherlands) Marcos Racing International	(Netherlands) Cor Euser (United Kingdom) Calum Lockie (Netherlands) Duncan Huisman	Chevrolet 6.9 L V8	G	330
50 DNF	GTS	53	(United States) Team Seattle/Park Place Racing	(Canada) Ross Bentley (Belgium) Bruno Lambert (United States) Don Kitch Jr. (United States) Dave Gaylord	Saleen S7-R	G	311
50 DNF	GTS	53	(United States) Team Seattle/Park Place Racing	(Canada) Ross Bentley (Belgium) Bruno Lambert (United States) Don Kitch Jr. (United States) Dave Gaylord	Ford 6.9 L V8	G	311
51 DNF	GT	39	(United States) Autosport Race Team	(United States) Tom Papadopoulos (United States) David Friedman (United States) Matt Plumb	Porsche 996 GT3-R	D	301
51 DNF	GT	39	(United States) Autosport Race Team	(United States) Tom Papadopoulos (United States) David Friedman (United States) Matt Plumb	Porsche 3.6 L Flat-6	D	301
52 DNF	GTS	12	(United States) K&N Filters Racing	(United States) R. K. Smith (United States) Rodney Mall (United States) Joey Scarallo (United States) Doug Dwyer	Ultima GTR	G	294
52 DNF	GTS	12	(United States) K&N Filters Racing	(United States) R. K. Smith (United States) Rodney Mall (United States) Joey Scarallo (United States) Doug Dwyer	Chevrolet 5.7 L V8	G	294
53 DNF	AGT	19	(United States) ACP Motorsports	(United States) Kerry Hitt (United States) Jim Briody (United States) Owen Trinkler (United States) Shane Lewis (United States) Jim Ludwik	Chevrolet Corvette	G	287
53 DNF	AGT	19	(United States) ACP Motorsports	(United States) Kerry Hitt (United States) Jim Briody (United States) Owen Trinkler (United States) Shane Lewis (United States) Jim Ludwik	Chevrolet 5.8 L V8	G	287
54 DNF	SRP II	21	(United States) Archangel Motorsport Services	(United States) Jeff Clinton (United States) Larry Connor (United States) Jeff Tillman (United States) Curtis Francois	Lola B2K/40	D	285
54 DNF	SRP II	21	(United States) Archangel Motorsport Services	(United States) Jeff Clinton (United States) Larry Connor (United States) Jeff Tillman (United States) Curtis Francois	Nissan 3.0 L V6	D	285
55 DNF	GT	99	(United States) Cirtek Motorsport	(New Zealand) Rob Wilson (United Kingdom) Martyn Konig (United Kingdom) Paul Dawson (United Kingdom) Pete Hannen	Porsche 996 GT3-R	D	284
55 DNF	GT	99	(United States) Cirtek Motorsport	(New Zealand) Rob Wilson (United Kingdom) Martyn Konig (United Kingdom) Paul Dawson (United Kingdom) Pete Hannen	Porsche 3.6 L Flat-6	D	284
56 DNF	AGT	91	(United States) Paladin Racing	(United States) Bill Beilharz (United States) Steve Lisa (United States) Paul Jenkins	Oldsmobile Aurora	G	275
56 DNF	AGT	91	(United States) Paladin Racing	(United States) Bill Beilharz (United States) Steve Lisa (United States) Paul Jenkins	Oldsmobile 5.9 L V8	G	275
57 DNF	SRP	16	(United States) Dyson Racing	(United Kingdom) James Weaver (United States) Butch Leitzinger (United Kingdom) Oliver Gavin	Riley & Scott Mk III	G	265
57 DNF	SRP	16	(United States) Dyson Racing	(United Kingdom) James Weaver (United States) Butch Leitzinger (United Kingdom) Oliver Gavin	Ford 6.0 L V8	G	265
58 DNF	GT	54	(United States) Bell Motorsports	(United States) Brian Cunningham (South Africa) Alan van der Merwe (United States) Andy Petery (United States) Ron Atapattu	BMW M3 E46 GTR	D	246
58 DNF	GT	54	(United States) Bell Motorsports	(United States) Brian Cunningham (South Africa) Alan van der Merwe (United States) Andy Petery (United States) Ron Atapattu	BMW 5.0 L V8	D	246
59 DNF	AGT	60	(United States) Xtreme Racing Group	(United States) Anthony Puleo (Switzerland) Robert Dubler (Germany) Ernst Gschwender (Switzerland) Hans Hauser	Chevrolet Corvette	G	232
59 DNF	AGT	60	(United States) Xtreme Racing Group	(United States) Anthony Puleo (Switzerland) Robert Dubler (Germany) Ernst Gschwender (Switzerland) Hans Hauser	Chevrolet 6.1 L V8	G	232
60	GT	18	(United States) Boston Motorsports Group	(Sri Lanka) Dilantha Malagamuwa (United States) Scott Deware (United Kingdom) Charles Lamb (United Kingdom) Martin Short	Mosler MT900 R	D	224
60	GT	18	(United States) Boston Motorsports Group	(Sri Lanka) Dilantha Malagamuwa (United States) Scott Deware (United Kingdom) Charles Lamb (United Kingdom) Martin Short	Chevrolet 5.7 L V8	D	224
61 DNF	GT	03	(United States) Marcos Racing International USA	(United States) Martin Shuster (United States) Larry Baisden (United States) John Annis (El Salvador) Toto Lassally	Marcos Mantis Plus	D	219
61 DNF	GT	03	(United States) Marcos Racing International USA	(United States) Martin Shuster (United States) Larry Baisden (United States) John Annis (El Salvador) Toto Lassally	Ford 4.6 L V8	D	219
62 DNF	SRP	95	(United States) TRV Motorsport	(United States) Jeret Schroeder (United States) Tom Volk (United States) John Macaluso (United States) John Schneider	Riley & Scott Mk III	G	216
62 DNF	SRP	95	(United States) TRV Motorsport	(United States) Jeret Schroeder (United States) Tom Volk (United States) John Macaluso (United States) John Schneider	Chevrolet 5.0 L V8	G	216
63 DNF	AGT	29	(United States) Sky Blue Racing	(United States) Irv Hoerr (United States) Woodson Duncan (United States) Jack Busch (United States) Darin Brassfield	Ford Mustang	G	196
63 DNF	AGT	29	(United States) Sky Blue Racing	(United States) Irv Hoerr (United States) Woodson Duncan (United States) Jack Busch (United States) Darin Brassfield	Ford 6.1 L V8	G	196
64 DNF	GT	84	(United Kingdom) Graham Nash Motorsport	(United Kingdom) Tom Herridge (United Kingdom) Mike Newton (United Kingdom) Chris Ellis (United Kingdom) Marco Attard	Porsche 996 GT3-R	D	184
64 DNF	GT	84	(United Kingdom) Graham Nash Motorsport	(United Kingdom) Tom Herridge (United Kingdom) Mike Newton (United Kingdom) Chris Ellis (United Kingdom) Marco Attard	Porsche 3.6 L Flat-6	D	184
65 DNF	SRP	74	(United States) Robinson Racing	(United States) Jack Baldwin (United States) Wally Dallenbach Jr. (United States) George Robinson (United States) Mark Simo	Riley & Scott Mk III C	G	170
65 DNF	SRP	74	(United States) Robinson Racing	(United States) Jack Baldwin (United States) Wally Dallenbach Jr. (United States) George Robinson (United States) Mark Simo	Judd 4.0 L V10	G	170
66 DNF	SRP II	89	(Canada) Porschehaus Racing	(Canada) Robert Julian (United States) Lynn Wilson (United States) Mayo T. Smith (United States) Adam Merzon	Lola B2K/40	D	164
66 DNF	SRP II	89	(Canada) Porschehaus Racing	(Canada) Robert Julian (United States) Lynn Wilson (United States) Mayo T. Smith (United States) Adam Merzon	Nissan 3.0 L V6	D	164
67	SRP	78	(United States) Sezio Florida Racing Team	(France) Yannick Roussel (United States) John Mirro (United States) Jon Krolowicz (France) François O'Born (Belgium) Anthony Kumpen	Norma M2000-01	G	160
67	SRP	78	(United States) Sezio Florida Racing Team	(France) Yannick Roussel (United States) John Mirro (United States) Jon Krolowicz (France) François O'Born (Belgium) Anthony Kumpen	Ford 4.0 L V8	G	160
68 DNF	GTS	45	(United States) American Viper Racing	(Netherlands) Mike Hezemans (United States) Simon Gregg (Italy) Stefano Zonca (United States) Marc Bunting	Dodge Viper GTS-R	G	132
68 DNF	GTS	45	(United States) American Viper Racing	(Netherlands) Mike Hezemans (United States) Simon Gregg (Italy) Stefano Zonca (United States) Marc Bunting	Dodge 8.0 L V10	G	132
69 DNF	AGT	90	(United States) Flis Racing	(United States) Kevin Harvick (United States) Rick Carelli (United States) John Metcalf (United States) Dave Liniger	Chevrolet Corvette	G	123
69 DNF	AGT	90	(United States) Flis Racing	(United States) Kevin Harvick (United States) Rick Carelli (United States) John Metcalf (United States) Dave Liniger	Chevrolet 5.9 L V8	G	123
70 DNF	SRP	23	(United Kingdom) Team Ascari	(United Kingdom) Ben Collins (Netherlands) Klaas Zwart (United Kingdom) Christian Vann	Ascari KZR-1	G	116
70 DNF	SRP	23	(United Kingdom) Team Ascari	(United Kingdom) Ben Collins (Netherlands) Klaas Zwart (United Kingdom) Christian Vann	BMW 4.0 L Turbo V8	G	116
71 DNF	SRP II	07	(United States) G&W Motorsports	(United States) Darren Law (United States) Steve Marshall (Italy) Armando Trentini (United States) Cort Wagner	Picchio D-USA	D	107
71 DNF	SRP II	07	(United States) G&W Motorsports	(United States) Darren Law (United States) Steve Marshall (Italy) Armando Trentini (United States) Cort Wagner	BMW 3.0 L I6	D	107
72 DNF	GT	50	(United States) AASCO/Boduck Racing	(United States) Craig Stanton (United States) Andy Hajducky (Japan) Takashi Suzuki (Costa Rica) Javier Quiros	BMW M3 E46 GTR	D	54
72 DNF	GT	50	(United States) AASCO/Boduck Racing	(United States) Craig Stanton (United States) Andy Hajducky (Japan) Takashi Suzuki (Costa Rica) Javier Quiros	BMW 5.0 L V8	D	54
73 DNF	GT	34	(United States) ZIP Racing	(United States) Spencer Pumpelly (United States) Steven Ivankovich (United States) Randy Pobst (United States) Kimberly Hiskey	Porsche 996 GT3-RS	D	15
73 DNF	GT	34	(United States) ZIP Racing	(United States) Spencer Pumpelly (United States) Steven Ivankovich (United States) Randy Pobst (United States) Kimberly Hiskey	Porsche 3.6 L Flat-6	D	15
74 DNF	SRP	06	(United States) Jacobs Motorsports	(United Kingdom) Ian James (United States) Michael Jacobs (United States) John Paul Jr. (United States) Travis Duder (United States) Michael DeFontes	Riley & Scott Mk III	G	0
74 DNF	SRP	06	(United States) Jacobs Motorsports	(United Kingdom) Ian James (United States) Michael Jacobs (United States) John Paul Jr. (United States) Travis Duder (United States) Michael DeFontes	Ford 6.0 L V8	G	0
