= 1998 24 Hours of Daytona =

Previous: 1997	Next: 1999
Index: Races | Winners

Track map of Daytona International Speedway

The 1998 Rolex 24 at Daytona was a 24-hour endurance sports car race held on February 1, 1998 at the Daytona International Speedway road course. The race served as the opening round of the 1998 United States Road Racing Championship. It was the first year that the race was sanctioned by the SCCA.

Victory overall and in the Can-Am class went to the No. 30 Doran/Moretti Racing Ferrari 333 SP driven by Giampiero Moretti, Arie Luyendyk, Mauro Baldi, and Didier Theys. Victory in the GT1 class went to the No. 01 Rohr Motorsport Porsche 911 GT1 driven by Allan McNish, Danny Sullivan, Jörg Müller, Uwe Alzen, and Dirk Müller. The GT2 class was won by the No. 97 Konrad Motorsport Porsche 911 GT2 driven by Toni Seiler, Wido Rössler, Peter Kitchak, Angelo Zadra, and Franz Konrad. Finally, the GT3 class was won by the No. 10 Prototype Technology Group, Inc. BMW M3 E36 driven by Bill Auberlen, Marc Duez, Boris Said, and Peter Cunningham.

== Race results ==
Class winners in bold.

Pos	Class	No	Team	Drivers	Car	Tire	Laps
1	**CA**	**30**	(Italy) **Doran/Moretti Racing**	(Italy) **Giampiero Moretti** (Netherlands) **Arie Luyendyk** (Italy) **Mauro Baldi** (Belgium) **Didier Theys**	**Ferrari 333 SP**	**Y**	**711**
2	**GT1**	**01**	(United States) **Rohr Motorsport**	(United Kingdom) **Allan McNish** (United States) **Danny Sullivan** (Germany) **Jörg Müller** (Germany) **Uwe Alzen** (Germany) **Dirk Müller**	**Porsche 911 GT1 Evo**	**M**	**703**
3	GT1	00	(France) Larbre Compétition	(France) Christophe Bouchut (France) Patrice Goueslard (Sweden) Carl Rosenblad (Germany) André Ahrlé	Porsche 911 GT1	**M**	667
4	**GT2**	**97**	(Austria) **Konrad Motorsport**	(Switzerland) **Toni Seiler** (Germany) **Wido Rössler** (United States) **Peter Kitchak** (Italy) **Angelo Zadra** (Austria) **Franz Konrad**	**Porsche 911 GT2**	**P**	**660**
5	GT2	04	(United States) C. J. Motorsports	(United States) John Morton (Canada) John Graham (Netherlands) Patrick Huisman (Netherlands) Duncan Huisman	Porsche 911 GT2	?	659
6	**GT3**	**10**	(United States) **Prototype Technology Group, Inc.**	(United States) **Bill Auberlen** (Belgium) **Marc Duez** (United States) **Boris Said** (United States) **Peter Cunningham**	**BMW M3 E36**	**Y**	**657**
7	GT3	23	(United States) Team Seattle/Alex Job Racing	(United States) Mike Conte (Belgium) Bruno Lambert (United Kingdom) Nick Holt (United States) Darryl Havens	Porsche 993 Carrera RSR	**P**	639
8	CA	63	(United States) Downing/Atlanta Racing	(Japan) Yojiro Terada (United States) Howard Katz (United States) John O'Steen (United States) Jim Downing (France) Franck Fréon	Kudzu DLM-4	**G**	636
9	GT3	55	(United States) AASCO Performance	(United States) Charles Slater (United States) Tim Ralston (United States) Tom Peterson (Costa Rica) Jorge Trejos	Porsche 911 Carrera RSR	**P**	629
10	GT3	73	(United States) Jack Lewis Enterprises Ltd.	(United States) Jack Lewis (Canada) Tony Burgess (United States) Anthony Lazzaro (United States) Kurt Matthewson	Porsche 993 Carrera RSR	**G**	626
11 DNF	GT1	4	(United States) Tom Gloy Racing	(United States) Mike Borkowski (Brazil) Tony Kanaan (United States) Robbie Buhl	Ford Mustang Cobra	?	624
12	GT3	25	(Germany) RWS-Brun Motorsport	(Austria) Hans-Jörg Hofer (Italy) Luca Riccitelli (Italy) Raffaele Sanguiolo (Germany) Günther Blieninger	Porsche 993 Cup	**M**	624
13	GT3	77	(United States) Grey Cliff Racing	(United States) John Drew (United States) David Friedman (United States) Beran Peter (United States) James Nelson (United States) Mark Greenburg	Porsche 993 Carrera RSR	**G**	622
14	GT2	81	(United Kingdom) Chamberlain Engineering	(United States) Chris Gleason (Australia) Ray Lintott (United States) Matt Turner (United Kingdom) Ashley Ward	Chrysler Viper GTS-R	**G**	619
15 DNF	CA	16	(United States) Dyson Racing	(United Kingdom) James Weaver (United States) Rob Dyson (United States) Dorsey Schroeder (United States) Elliott Forbes-Robinson	Riley & Scott Mk III	**G**	616
16	GT3	7	(United States) Prototype Technology Group, Inc.	(Canada) Ross Bentley (United States) Les Delano (United States) Andy Petery (United States) Derek Hill	BMW M3 E36	**Y**	616
17 DNF	CA	20	(United States) Dyson Racing	(United States) Butch Leitzinger (United States) John Paul Jr. (United Kingdom) Perry McCarthy (United States) Rob Dyson	Riley & Scott Mk III	**G**	615
18	GT3	07	(United States) G&W Motorsports	(United States) Price Cobb (United States) Danny Marshall (United Kingdom) Peter Chambers (Germany) Ulrich Gallade (United Kingdom) Martyn Konig	Porsche 993	?	615
19 DNF	GT1	38	(United States) Champion Motors	(Belgium) Thierry Boutsen (United States) Andy Pilgrim (Germany) Ralf Kelleners	Porsche 911 GT1 Evo	**P**	614
20 DNF	CA	3	(United States) Scandia Engineering	(France) Yannick Dalmas (France) Bob Wollek (Italy) Max Papis (Canada) Ron Fellows	Ferrari 333 SP	**G**	610
21	GT2	21	(Germany) Dener Motorsport Stuttgart Sportscar	(Brazil) André Lara-Resende (Brazil) Régis Schuch (Brazil) Flávio Trindale (Brazil) Maurizio Sandro Sala	Porsche 911 GT2	**P**	604
22	CA	62	(United States) Downing/Atlanta Racing	(United States) John Mirro (United States) Ralph Thomas (United States) Douglas Campbell (United States) Dennis Spencer (United States) Rich Grupp	Kudzu DLM	**G**	591
23	GT3	67	(United States) The Racer's Group	(United States) Chris Ronson (United States) Brian Pelke (United States) Steve Pelke (United States) Bruce Busby	Porsche 911 Carrera RSR	**G**	567
24	GT3	09	(United States) Spirit of Daytona Racing	(United States) Craig Conway (United States) Eric van Cleef (United States) Todd Flis	Mitsubishi Eclipse GSX	**T**	563
25 DNF	CA	95	(United States) TRV Motorsport	(United States) Jeret Schroeder (United States) Tom Volk (United States) Lyn St. James (United States) Pete Halsmer	Kudzu DL-4	**G**	557
26 DNF	CA	39	(United States) Colucci/Matthews Racing	(United States) David Murry (United States) Hurley Haywood (United Kingdom) Derek Bell (United States) Jim Matthews	Riley & Scott Mk III	**P**	550
27	GT1	29	(United States) Overbagh Motor Racing	(Italy) Fabio Rosa (Italy) Giovanni Vigano (Italy) Gabrio Rosa (Italy) Pierangelo Masselli (United States) C. J. Johnson	Chevrolet Camaro	**G**	547
28	GT2	71	(United States) Pettit Racing	(United States) Cameron Worth (United States) Nick Vitucci (United States) Bill Lester (United States) Scott Sansone (United States) Brian Richards	Mazda RX-7 Turbo	**H**	539
29	GT2	69	(Germany) Proton Competition	(Switzerland) Denis Lay (Germany) Gerd Ruch (United States) Will Langhorne (Germany) Gerold Ried	Porsche 911 GT2	?	498
30 DNF	CA	8	(United States) Transatlantic Racing/Support Net Racing	(United States) Johnny O'Connell (United States) Henry Camferdam (United States) Scott Schubot	Riley & Scott Mk III	**D**	497
31	GT1	40	(United States) Rankin Racing, Inc.	(United States) David Rankin (United States) Hank Scott (Canada) Eric Jensen (El Salvador) Toto Lassally (United States) Nort Northam	Chevrolet Camaro	**G**	494
32 DNF	GT1	99	(United States) Panoz-Visteon Racing	(France) Éric Bernard (Australia) David Brabham (United Kingdom) Jamie Davies	Panoz GTR-1	**M**	472
33 DNF	GT3	54	(United States) Bell Motorsports	(United States) Stu Hayner (Ecuador) Henry Taleb (United States) Scott Neuman (United States) Terry Borcheller	BMW M3 E36	**Y**	455
34	GT3	24	(United States) Team Seattle/Alex Job Racing	(United States) Don Kitch Jr. (United States) Byron Sanborn (Italy) Angelo Cilli (United States) Kim Wolfkill	Porsche 911 Carrera RSR	**P**	448
35	GT1	56	Team Argentina	(Argentina) Gaston Aguirre (Argentina) Francisco Castillo (Argentina) Horacio Paolucci (Argentina) Facundo Gilbicella	Oldsmobile Cutlass	**G**	445
36	GT1	87	(United States) John Annis Racing	(United States) John Annis (United States) Lee Hill (United States) Bill Ladoniczki (United States) Steve Ladoniczki (United States) Randy Pobst	Chevrolet Camaro	?	438
37	GT1	35	(United States) McDill Racing	(Italy) Stefano Bucci (Italy) Mauro Casadei (Italy) Francesco Ciani (Italy) Andrea Garbagnati	Chevrolet Camaro	**Y**	437
38 DNF	GT1	0	(Canada) Multimatic Motorsports	(Canada) Scott Maxwell (Canada) Jason Priestley (Canada) David Empringham	Ford Mustang Cobra	**D**	435
39 DNF	GT1	5	(United States) Panoz-Visteon Racing	(United Kingdom) Andy Wallace (United States) Scott Pruett (Brazil) Raul Boesel (United States) Doc Bundy	Panoz GTR-1	**M**	433
40 DNF	CA	28	(United States) Intersport Racing	(United States) Jon Field (United States) Rick Sutherland (United States) Butch Brickell (Italy) Enrico Bertaggia (United States) Alex Padilla	Riley & Scott Mk III	**G**	432
41	CA	51	(United States) Fantasy Junction-Coys Racing	(United States) Bruce Trenery (United States) Spencer Trenery (United Kingdom) Grahame Bryant (United States) Steve Pfeifer (United States) Kent Painter	Cannibal	?	414
42	GT1	89	(United States) Maugeri Motorsports	(United States) Richard Maugeri (United States) Anthony Puleo (United States) Sim Penton (United States) Daniel Urrutia	Chevrolet Camaro	**G**	385
43 DNF	GT3	96	(United States) Olive Garden Racing	(United States) Ronald Zitza (United States) Kevin Wheeler (United States) Mike Davies	Porsche 993	**P**	381
44 DNF	CA	88	(United States) Dollahite Racing	(United States) Anthony Lazzaro (United States) Bill Dollahite (United States) Paul Dallenbach	Spice BDG-02	**P**	371
45 DNF	CA	59	(United States) Intersport Racing	(United States) Simon Gregg (Germany) Oliver Kuttner (United States) Joaquin DeSoto (United States) Tim Holt	Spice SC95	**G**	344
46 DNF	GT3	52	(United States) Team Protosport GT	(United States) Dave Russell (United States) William Stitt (United States) Mark Hillstead (United States) Paul Arnold (Germany) Neil Crilly	Porsche 911 Carrera RSR	**Y**	342
47 DNF	GT3	41	(United States) Technodyne	(United States) Cort Wagner (United States) Chris Cervelli (Germany) Marc Basseng (United States) Kelly Collins	Porsche 993 Carrera RSR	**P**	335
48 DNF	CA	36	(United States) Colucci/Matthews Racing	(Chile) Eliseo Salazar (United States) Jim Pace (United States) Barry Waddell	Riley & Scott Mk III	**P**	300
49	GT3	33	(United States) Phoenix American Motorsport	(United States) Mike Weinberg (United States) Jim Michaelian (United States) Bob Rockwood (United States) Steve McNeely	Pontiac Firebird Formula	**H**	295
50	CA	19	(United States) Davin Racing	(United States) A. J. Smith (United States) Mark Montgomery (United States) Edd Davin	Kudzu DLM	**G**	287
51	GT3	27	(United States) Goldin Brother Racing	(United States) Steve Goldin (United States) John G. Thomas (United States) Todd Vallancourt (United States) Keith Goldin	Mazda RX-7	**H**	277
52	GT3	86	(United States) G&W Motorsports	(United Kingdom) Brian Redman (United States) Steve Marshall (United States) Arthur Urciuoli (Sweden) Robert Amren (United States) Price Cobb	Porsche 993 Carrera RSR	?	272
53 DNF	GT2	50	(United States) Johnson Autosport Racing	(United States) J. Robert Johnson (United States) Tom McGlynn (United States) James Oppenheimer (United States) George Balbach (United States) Erik Johnson	Porsche 911 Turbo	**D**	248
54 DNF	GT2	98	(Austria) Konrad Motorsport	(United States) Larry Schumacher (United Kingdom) Robert Nearn (Austria) Franz Konrad (United States) Nick Ham	Porsche 911 GT2	**P**	245
55 DNF	CA	17	(United States) Doyle-Risi Racing	(South Africa) Wayne Taylor (Belgium) Eric van de Poele (Spain) Fermín Vélez	Ferrari 333 SP	**P**	225
56	GT1	53	(United States) Diablo Racing	(United States) Tom Scheuren (United States) Spencer Pumpelly (United States) Gerry Green (United States) Bobby Jones	Chevrolet Camaro	**G**	195
57 DNF	GT3	57	(United States) Kryderacing	(United States) Reed Kryder (United States) Steve Ahlgrim (United States) Dave Deen (United States) Frank Del Vecchio (United States) Ryan Hampton	Nissan 240SX	?	191
58 DNF	GT1	74	(United States) Robinson Racing	(United States) George Robinson (United States) Jack Baldwin (United States) Irv Hoerr (United States) Jon Gooding	Oldsmobile Aurora	**G**	183
59 DNF	GT3	45	(Belgium) GLPK Racing Leaders	(Belgium) Stéphane Cohen (Belgium) Paul Kumpen (Belgium) Marc Schoonbroodt (Germany) Michael Funke	Porsche 911 GT2	?	182
60 DNF	GT2	90	(Belgium) AD Sport	(Belgium) Kris Wauters (Belgium) Koen Wauters (Belgium) Franco La Rosa (Belgium) Bert Longin (Belgium) Albert Vanierschot	Porsche 911 GT2	**G**	173
61 DNF	GT1	2	(United States) Mosler Automotive	(United States) Shane Lewis (United States) Vic Rice (United States) Brian Hornkohl (United States) Chris Neville	Mosler Raptor	?	169
62 DNF	GT3	37	(United States) GTR Motorsports	(United States) Dave White (United States) Jim Loftis (United States) Bob Strange (United States) Richard Howe	Porsche 968 GTR	**D**	154
63 DNF	GT3	76	(United States) Team A.R.E.	(United States) Mike Doolin (United States) Scott Peeler (United States) John Ruther (United States) Martin Snow	Porsche 993 Carrera RSR	**Y**	154
64 DNF	GT3	68	(United States) The Racer's Group	(United States) Kevin Buckler (United States) Philip Collin (United States) Eric Bretzel (United States) Duncan Dayton	Porsche 993 Carrera RSR	**G**	142
65 DNF	GT3	75	(United States) On the Edge Racing	(United States) Max Schmidt (United States) Chris Bingham (United Kingdom) Nigel Smith (United States) Scott Harrington	Porsche 993 Carrera RSR	?	115
66 DNF	GT2	58	(United States) Broadfoot Racing	(France) Pascal Dro (United States) Martin Shuster (France) Phillipe Lenain	Porsche 944 Turbo	**G**	114
67 DNF	GT3	6	(United States) Prototype Technology Group, Inc.	(United States) Mark Simo (Austria) Dieter Quester (United States) Peter Cunningham	BMW M3 E36	**Y**	87
68 DNF	GT2	05	(United States) Prova Motorsports	(Netherlands) Cor Euser (Japan) Masamitsu Ishihara (Japan) Katsunori Iketani	Porsche 911 GT2	**D**	79
69 DNF	CA	60	(United States) Kopf Precision Race Products	(United States) Shane Donley (United States) Kris Wilson (United States) Tim Moser	Keiler KII	**D**	50
70 DNF	GT1	46	(United Kingdom) Newcastle United Storm Racing	(United Kingdom) Julian Bailey (United Kingdom) Tiff Needell (New Zealand) Craig Baird (United Kingdom) Richard Dean	Lister Storm GTL	**M**	45
71 DNF	GT1	72	(United States) Banks Motorsport	(United States) Tim Banks (United States) Todd Sprinkle (United States) Kerry Hitt	Chevrolet Corvette	?	38
72 DNF	GT3	32	(United States) Phoenix American Motorsport	(United States) John Heinricy (United States) Stu Hayner (United States) Scott Harrington (United States) Don Knowles	Pontiac Firebird Formula	?	9
73 DNF	GT3	44	(Belgium) GLPK Racing Leaders	(Germany) Harald Grohs (Belgium) Hans Willems (Belgium) Vincent Dupont (Belgium) Alfons Taels	Porsche 911	**P**	8
74 DNF	CA	11	(United States) Genesis Racing National Paintball	(United States) Rick Fairbanks (United States) Michael DeFontes (United States) Chuck Goldsborough (United States) Dan Lewis (United States) Mark Newhaus	Hawk MD3R	?	5
DNS	GT2	65	(United States) Saleen/Allen RRR Speedlab	(United States) Steve Saleen (United States) Ron Johnson (United Kingdom) Will Hoy	Saleen S281	?	-
DNS	GT2	15	(United States) Kevin Jeannette	(United States) Jay Cochran (United States) Michel Aouate	Porsche 993	?	-
