= 1999 24 Hours of Daytona =

Previous: 1998	Next: 2000
Index: Races | Winners

Track map of Daytona International Speedway

The 1999 Rolex 24 at Daytona was a 24-hour endurance sports car race held on January 30–31, 1999 at the Daytona International Speedway road course. The race served as the opening round of the 1999 United States Road Racing Championship. It was the second and final year that the race was sanctioned by the SCCA before being taken over by Grand-Am.

Victory overall and in the Can-Am class went to the No. 20 Dyson Racing Riley & Scott Mk III driven by Butch Leitzinger, Andy Wallace, and Elliott Forbes-Robinson. Victory in the GT2 class went to the No. 83 Roock Racing Porsche 911 GT2 driven by André Ahrlé, Raffaele Sangiuolo, David Warnock, and Hubert Haupt. The GT3 class was won by the No. 23 Team Seattle/Alex Job Racing Porsche 993 Carrera RSR driven by Kelly Collins, Cort Wagner, Anthony Lazzaro, and Darryl Havens. Finally, the GTT class was won by the No. 19 SK Group Motorsports Ford Mustang Cobra driven by Kyle McIntyre, Gary Stewart, Andy Petery, Craig Carter, and Les Delano.

== Race results ==
Class winners in bold.

Pos	Class	No	Team	Drivers	Car	Tire	Laps
1	**CA**	**20**	**(United States) Dyson Racing**	**(United States) Butch Leitzinger (United Kingdom) Andy Wallace (United States) Elliott Forbes-Robinson**	**Riley & Scott Mk III-Ford**	**G**	**708**
2	CA	7	(United States) Doyle-Risi Racing	(United Kingdom) Allan McNish (Belgium) Didier de Radiguès (Italy) Max Angelelli (South Africa) Wayne Taylor	Ferrari 333 SP	**P**	706
3	CA	36	(United States) Matthews Racing	(Italy) Max Papis (Sweden) Stefan Johansson (United States) Jimmy Vasser (United States) Jim Matthews	Ferrari 333 SP	**M**	694
4	CA	00	(Switzerland) Autosport Racing	(Switzerland) Enzo Calderari (Italy) Angelo Zadra (Switzerland) Lilian Bryner (Sweden) Carl Rosenblad	Ferrari 333 SP	**P**	679
5	CA	8	(United States) Transatlantic Racing	(Chile) Eliseo Salazar (United States) Duncan Dayton (United States) Henry Camferdam (United States) Scott Schubot	Riley & Scott Mk III-Ford	**G**	643
6	**GT3**	**23**	**(United States) Team Seattle/Alex Job Racing**	**(United States) Kelly Collins (United States) Cort Wagner (United States) Anthony Lazzaro (United States) Darryl Havens**	**Porsche 993 Carrera RSR**	**Y**	**639**
7	**GT2**	**83**	**(Germany) Roock Racing**	**(Germany) André Ahrlé (Italy) Raffaele Sangiuolo (United Kingdom) David Warnock (Germany) Hubert Haupt**	**Porsche 911 GT2**	**Y**	**634**
8	CA	72	(United States) Doran Racing	(Belgium) Didier Theys (Switzerland) Fredy Lienhard (Netherlands) Arie Luyendyk (Italy) Mauro Baldi	Ferrari 333 SP	**M**	632
9	GT3	02	(United States) Reiser/Callas Rennsport	(United States) David Murry (United Kingdom) Johnny Mowlem (Canada) Joel Reiser (United States) Grady Willingham	Porsche 993 Carrera RSR	?	632
10	GT2	99	(United States) Schumacher Racing	(Germany) Dirk Müller (United States) Martin Snow (United States) John O'Steen (United States) Larry Schumacher	Porsche 911 GT2	**M**	626
11	GT3	07	(United States) G&W Motorsports	(United States) Darren Law (United States) Steve Marshall (Netherlands) Patrick Huisman (Canada) Sylvain Tremblay (United States) Danny Marshall	Porsche 911 GT2 Evo	**P**	625
12	GT3	18	(United States) Millennium Motorsports	(United States) David Friedman (United States) Chris Miller (United States) Vic Rice (United States) Geoff Auberlen (United States) Beran Peter	Porsche 911 Carrera RSR	**Y**	623
13	GT3	17	(United States) T. C. Kline Racing	(United States) Shane Lewis (United States) Randy Pobst (United States) Bob Mazzuoccola (United States) Mark Raccaro	BMW M3 E36	**Y**	622
14	GT3	68	(United States) The Racer's Group	(United States) Kevin Buckler (United States) Mike Conte (United Kingdom) Nick Holt (Belgium) Bruno Lambert	Porsche 993 Carrera RSR	**G**	617
15	CA	62	(United States) Downing/Atlanta Racing	(Italy) Ermano Ronchi (United States) Ben Treadway (Italy) Fabio Montani (United States) Dennis Spencer	Kudzu DLM-Mazda	**G**	611
16	GT3	66	(Italy) M.A.C. Racing	(Italy) Massimo Morini (Italy) Angelo Scarpetta (Italy) Luca Cattaneo (Italy) Luciano Tamburini (Italy) Antonio De Castro	Porsche 993 Cup	?	605
17	GT3	54	(United States) Bell Motorsports	(United States) Tony Kester (United States) Matt Drendel (United States) Terry Borcheller (United States) Jim Kenton (United States) Scott Neuman	BMW M3 E36	**Y**	602
18	GT2	2	(United States) Corvette Racing	(Canada) Ron Fellows (United States) Chris Kneifel (United States) John Paul Jr.	Chevrolet Corvette C5-R	**G**	600
19	GT2	77	(Germany) Seikel Motorsport	(New Zealand) Andrew Bagnall (Italy) Renato Mastropietro (Canada) Tony Burgess (Belgium) Michel Neugarten	Porsche 911 GT2	**D**	597
20 DNF	GT2	49	(Germany) Freisinger Motorsport	(Germany) Michael Irmgratz (Austria) Manfred Jurasz (France) Eric van der Vyver (Germany) Klaus Horn	Porsche 911 GT2	**M**	595
21	CA	95	(United States) TRV Motorsport	(United States) Jeret Schroeder (United States) Tom Volk (United States) Peter Debban (United States) R. J. Valentine	Riley & Scott Mk III-Chevrolet	**G**	595
22	CA	16	(United States) Dyson Racing	(United Kingdom) James Weaver (United States) Rob Dyson (United States) Dorsey Schroeder (United States) Stu Hayner	Riley & Scott Mk III-Ford	**G**	593
23	CA	3	(United States) DLW Racing, Inc.	(United States) Hurley Haywood (United States) Don Whittington (United States) Dale Whittington (United States) Danny Sullivan	Riley & Scott Mk III-Ford	**G**	590
24	CA	63	(United States) Downing/Atlanta Racing	(United States) Howard Katz (Japan) Youjirou Terada (United States) Chris Ronson (United States) Jim Downing	Kudzu DLY-Mazda	**G**	586
25	GT2	82	(Germany) Roock Racing	(Monaco) Stéphane Ortelli (Italy) Enrico Bertaggia (Germany) Claudia Hürtgen (United Kingdom) Robert Nearn	Porsche 911 GT2	**Y**	581
26	GT3	44	(United States) Specter Werks Sports	(United States) Jeff Nowicki (United States) R. K. Smith (United States) Rick Mancuso (United States) Tom Murphy (United States) Mike Farmer	Chevrolet Corvette	**H**	578
27	GT3	39	(United States) Pumpelly/Mitchum Motorsports	(United States) Spencer Pumpelly (United States) Chris Mitchum (United States) David Kicak (United States) Bill Lester (France) Pascal Dro	Porsche 993 Carrera RSR	?	575
28	**GTT**	**19**	**(United States) SK Group Motorsports**	**(United States) Kyle McIntyre (United States) Gary Stewart (United States) Andy Petery (United States) Craig Carter (United States) Les Delano**	**Ford Mustang Cobra**	**G**	**550**
29	GT3	73	(United States) Jack Lewis Enterprises Ltd.	(United States) Kevin Wheeler (United States) Jack Lewis (Italy) Ludovico Manfredi (Japan) Kiichi Takahashi (United States) Ron Henriksen	Porsche 911 Carrera RSR	?	540
30	GT2	75	(United States) Pettit Racing	(United States) Cameron Worth (United States) Scott Sansone (United States) Steve Pfeifer (United States) Ryan Hampton	Mazda RX-7	**H**	535
31	CA	47	(United States) RaceStar Motorsports	(United States) Todd Vallancourt (United Kingdom) Ian James (United States) John G. Thomas	Spice SE90-Chevrolet	**G**	528
32	GT3	42	(Italy) Supertech S. B. Racing	(Italy) Pierangelo Masselli (Italy) Marco de Iturbe (Italy) Gianluca de Lorenzi (Italy) Gianni Biava (Italy) Franco Scarpini	Ferrari F355	**P**	517
33	CA	60	(United States) Kopf Precision Race Products	(United States) Kris Wilson (United States) Tim Moser (United States) Barry Waddell	Keiler KII-Ford	**G**	510
34	GT2	55	(Germany) Proton Competition	(Switzerland) Toni Seiler (Germany) Gerold Ried (France) Patrick Vuillaume (Germany) Gerd Ruch	Porsche 911 GT2	**D**	502
35	GT3	27	(United States) Goldin Brothers Racing	(United States) Keith Goldin (United States) Steve Goldin (United States) Scott Finlay (United States) Dave Russell	Mazda RX-7	**H**	484
36	GT3	45	(United States) Bell Motorsports	(United States) Peter Baron (United States) James McCormick (Australia) Barry Graham (United States) Leo Hindery (United States) Brian Till	BMW M3 E36	**Y**	467
37	GT3	89	(United States) Broadfoot Racing	(Germany) Neil Crilly (United States) Caroline Wright (France) Phillipe Lenain (United States) Mike Borkowski (United States) Steve Bove	Porsche 944 Turbo	**D**	465
38	GTT	40	(United States) Rankin Racing	(United States) Hank Scott (El Salvador) Toto Lasally (United States) C. Peter Pope (United States) David Rankin (United States) Richard McDill	Chevrolet Camaro	?	461
39	GT3	09	(United States) Spirit of Daytona Racing	(United States) Craig Conway (United States) Eric van Cleef (United States) Todd Flis	Mitsubishi Eclipse	?	455
40 DNF	GT2	33	(Germany) Konrad Motorsport	(Germany) Altfrid Heger (United States) Peter Kitchak (United States) Charles Slater (Austria) Franz Konrad	Porsche 911 GT2	**D**	452
41	GTT	79	(United States) Maugeri Motorsports	(United States) Richard Maugeri (United States) Anthony Puleo (United States) Sim Penton (Canada) Doug Mills (United States) Ronald Zitza	Chevrolet Camaro	?	418
42 DNF	CA	28	(United States) Intersport Racing	(United States) Jon Field (United States) Ryan Jones (United States) Sam Hornish Jr. (United States) Michael Shank	Lola B98/10-Ford	**G**	399
43	GT2	03	(United States) NP Racing	(United States) Bret Parker (United States) Kevin Allen (United States) Neil Hanneman (United States) Larry Parker	Dodge Viper GTS-R	**D**	390
44 DNF	GT2	48	(Germany) Freisinger Motorsport	(Germany) Wolfgang Kaufmann (France) Michel Ligonnet (United States) Lance Stewart	Porsche 911 GT2	**M**	386
45 DNF	GT3	56	(Germany) Manthey Racing	(Belgium) Hans Willems (Germany) Olaf Manthey (Germany) Marc Gindorf (Germany) Ulrich Gallade (Germany) Ulli Richter	Porsche 993 Carrera RSR	?	377
46	GT2	4	(United States) Corvette Racing	(United States) Scott Sharp (United States) Andy Pilgrim (United States) John Heinricy	Chevrolet Corvette C5-R	**G**	366
47 DNF	CA	15	(United States) Hybrid Racing	(Canada) Ross Bentley (United States) Chris Bingham (France) Didier André (France) Franck Fréon	Riley & Scott Mk III-Ford	**Y**	349
48 DNF	GT3	04	(United States) Schmidt Motorsports	(United States) Max Schmidt (United States) Rusty Schmidt (United States) Jeff Conkel (United States) Scott Harrington	Porsche 993 Carrera RSR	?	343
49	GT3	57	(United States) Kryderacing	(United States) Reed Kryder (France) Christian Heinkélé (United States) Steve Ahlgrim	Nissan 240SX	**G**	341
50	GTT	53	(United States) Diablo Racing	(United States) Tom Scheuren (United States) Mayo T. Smith (United States) John McNaughton (United States) John Halbing III (United States) Bobby Jones	Chevrolet Camaro	**G**	340
51 DNF	GT3	22	(United States) Team Seattle/Alex Job Racing	(United States) Don Kitch Jr. (United States) Kim Wolfkill (United States) John Hill (United States) Wade Gaughran	Porsche 993 Carrera RSR	**Y**	327
52 DNF	GT3	76	(United States) Team A.R.E.	(United States) Peter Argetsinger (United States) Richard Polidori (United States) Steve Hill (Canada) John McCaig	Porsche 993 Carrera RSR	**Y**	326
53 DNF	GT3	24	(United States) Michael Jacobs	(United States) Michael Jacobs (United States) George Biskup (United States) John Steinmetz (United States) Michael DeFontes (United States) Frank Del Vecchio	Ferrari 348	**P**	326
54 DNF	GT3	67	(United States) The Racer's Group	(United States) Steve Pelke (United States) Brian Pelke (United States) Ron Herrerias (United States) Pat DiGiovanni	Porsche 911 Carrera RSR	**G**	312
55 DNF	CA	74	(United States) Robinson Racing	(United States) George Robinson (United States) Jack Baldwin (United States) Irv Hoerr (United States) Jon Gooding	Riley & Scott Mk III-Chevrolet	**G**	299
56 DNF	GT2	81	(United Kingdom) Chamberlain Engineering	(United States) Chris Gleason (Germany) Christian Gläsel (United States) Brian Hornkohl (Netherlands) Hans Hugenholtz	Dodge Viper GTS-R	**D**	297
57	GTT	96	(United States) Entropy Racing	(United States) Gerry Green (United States) Scott Brunk (United States) Rich Bell (United States) Keith Fisher (United States) Tony Tola	Chevrolet Camaro	**G**	273
58 DNF	GTT	87	(United States) John Annis	(United States) John Annis (United States) John Kohler (United States) Bill Ladoniczki (United States) Steve Ladoniczki (United States) Mark Kennedy	Chevrolet Camaro	?	263
59 DNF	GT2	52	(United States) Easton Properties Corp.	(United States) Paul Arnold (United States) William Stitt (Canada) Victor Sifton (United States) Simon Gregg	Acura NSX	**P**	261
60 DNF	GT3	6	(United States) Prototype Technology Group, Inc.	(Austria) Dieter Quester (United States) Boris Said (United States) Peter Cunningham (United States) Mark Simo (United States) Ernie Irvan	BMW M3 E36	**Y**	247
61 DNF	GT2	70	(Netherlands) Marcos Racing	(Netherlands) Cor Euser (Netherlands) Herman Buurman (Netherlands) Peter van der Kolk (United Kingdom) Christian Vann	Marcos LM600	**D**	242
62 DNF	GT3	10	(United States) Prototype Technology Group, Inc.	(United States) Bill Auberlen (United States) Brian Cunningham (United States) Johannes van Overbeek (Germany) Hans-Joachim Stuck	BMW M3 E36	**Y**	238
63 DNF	CA	29	(United States) Intersport Racing	(United States) Sam Brown (United States) Butch Brickell (Canada) Jacek Mucha (United States) John Mirro	Riley & Scott Mk III-Ford	**G**	225
64 DNF	CA	12	(United States) Genesis Racing	(United States) Chuck Goldsborough (United States) Kurt Baumann (United States) Jeff Altenburg (United States) Rick Fairbanks (United States) Anthony Cafik	Hawk MD3R-Chevrolet	?	225
65 DNF	GT2	50	(France) Viper Team Oreca	(Monaco) Olivier Beretta (United States) Tommy Archer (United States) David Donohue	Dodge Viper GTS-R	**M**	188
66 DNF	CA	88	(United States) Dollahite Racing	(United States) Mike Davies (United States) Bill Dollahite (United States) Doc Bundy (United States) Paul Dallenbach	Ferrari 333 SP	**P**	168
67 DNF	GTT	13	(United States) DM Motorsports	(United States) Mark Montgomery (United States) Martin Shuster (United States) Bruce Trenery (United States) Spencer Trenery (United States) Dick Greer	Chevrolet Camaro	?	167
68 DNF	GT2	21	(Switzerland) Haberthur Racing	(Italy) Gabrio Rosa (Italy) Fabio Rosa (Italy) Roberto Mangifesta (Italy) Stefano Zonca	Porsche 911 GT2	**D**	128
69 DNF	CA	78	(France) SBF Racing	(France) Patrice Roussel (France) Edouard Sezionale (France) Sylvain Boulay	Norma M14-Buick	?	128
70 DNF	GT2	08	(United States) G&W Motorsports	(New Zealand) Rob Wilson (United Kingdom) Martyn Konig (United States) Jake Ulrich (United Kingdom) Michael Pickup	Porsche 911 GT2	**D**	89
71 DNF	CA	32	(Germany) Konrad Motorsport	(Netherlands) Jan Lammers (Austria) Franz Konrad (Italy) Vincenzo Sospiri	Lola B98/10-Lotus	**D**	43
72 DNF	GT3	58	(United States) Petersen Racing	(Italy) Angelo Cilli (United States) John Ruther (United States) Tommy Miller (United States) Dale White (United States) Michael Petersen	Porsche 993 Carrera RSR	**Y**	22
73 DNF	GT3	25	(Germany) RWS-Brun Motorsport	(Austria) Hans-Jörg Hofer (Italy) Luca Riccitelli (Germany) Günter Blieninger (Italy) Fabio Mancini	Porsche 993 Carrera RSR	**M**	14
74 DNF	GT3	92	(United States) Reiser/Callas Rennsport	(United Kingdom) Johnny Mowlem (Canada) Joel Reiser (United States) Grady Willingham (United States) David Murry	Porsche 993 Carrera RSR	?	11
75 DNF	GT2	31	(Switzerland) Haberthur Racing	(Italy) Mauro Casadei (Italy) Francesco Ciani (Italy) Stefano Bucci (Italy) Andrea Garbagnati	Porsche 911 GT2	**D**	9
76 DNF	GT3	69	(France) Perspective Racing	(France) Bob Wollek (France) Thierry Perrier (France) Jean-Louis Ricci (France) Gérard Larrousse (France) Jean-Paul Richard	Porsche 993 Carrera RSR	**P**	7
77 DNF	GT3	01	(United States) Greycliff Racing	(United States) James Nelson (United States) John Drew (United States) Beran Peter (United States) Jim Michaelian (United States) Mark Greenberg	Porsche 993 Carrera RSR	?	3
78 DNF	GT3	93	(Ecuador) Saeta Airlines Racing	(Ecuador) Henry Taleb (Ecuador) Jean-Pierre Michelet (Ecuador) Marcelo Darquea (Ecuador) Walter Jimenez	Nissan 240SX	**Y**	0
