= Noël del Bello =

French racing driver (1938–2024)

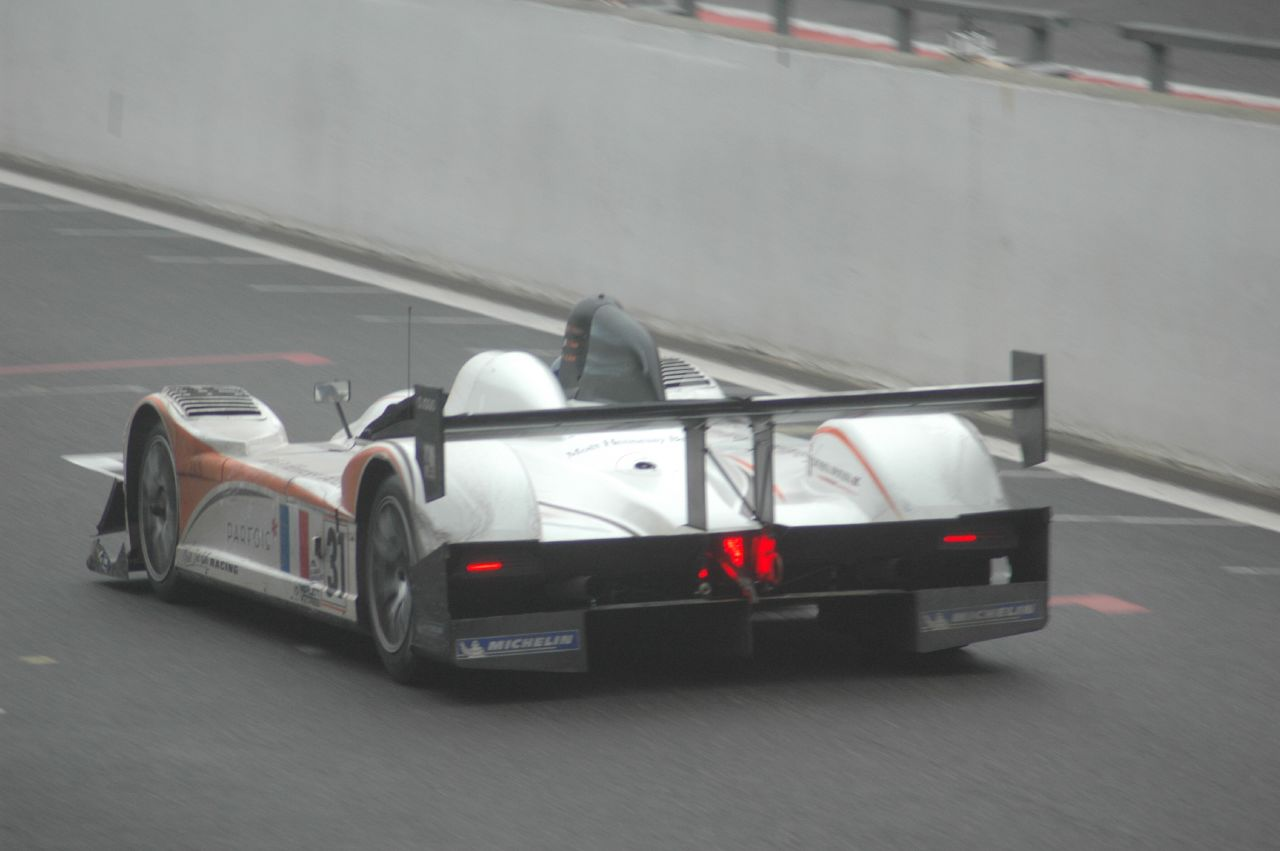
Noel del Bello's Courage C65-Mecachrome at the 2005 1000km of Spa

Noël del Bello (25 December 1942 – 15 April 2024) was a French racing driver. Del Bello was born in Nantua on 25 December 1938, and died on 15 April 2024, at the age of 81.
