= Motor Development International =

French company that designed compressed air-powered car prototypes

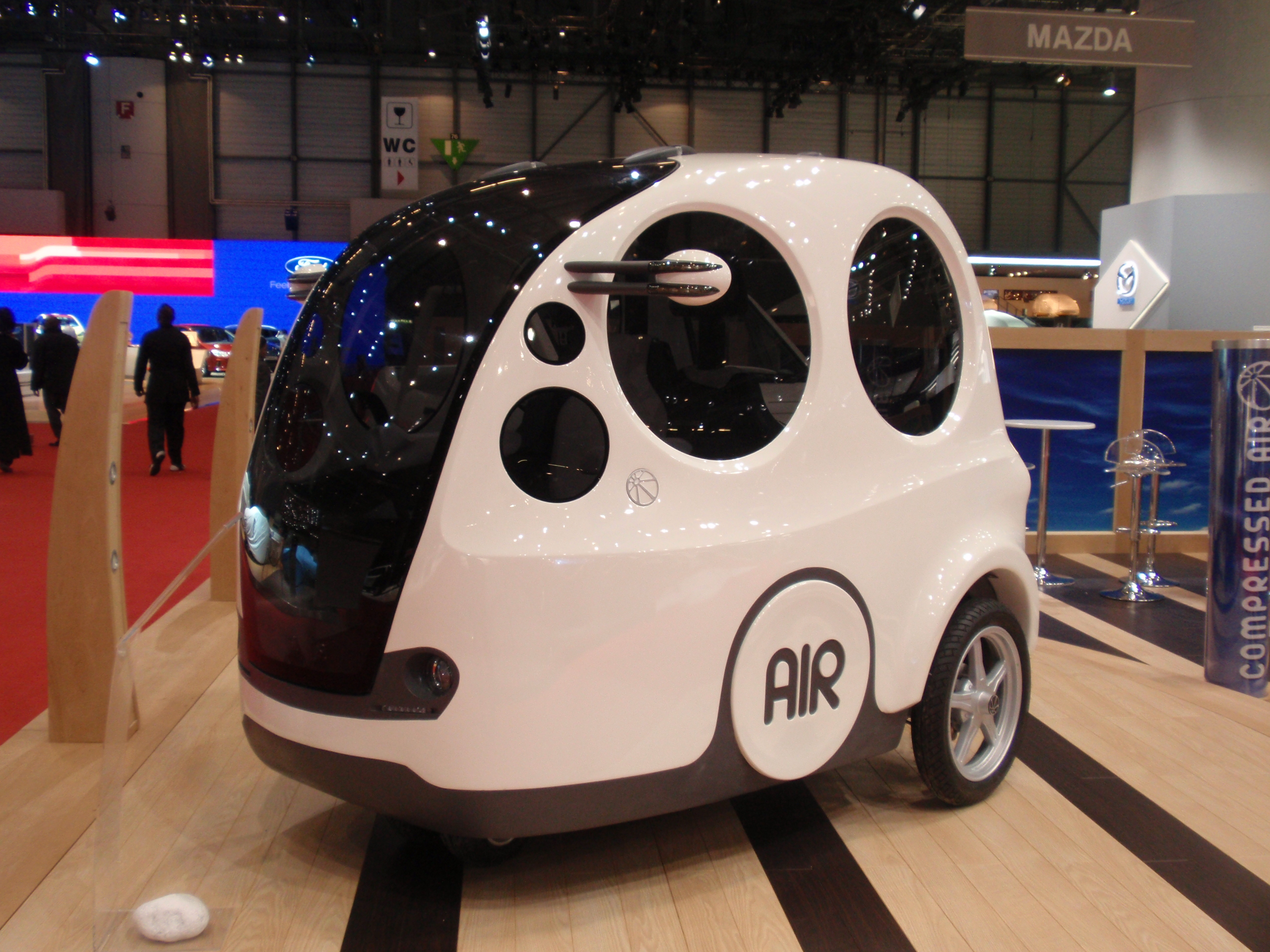
- Type: Private S.A.
- Industry: Automobile industry
- Genre: Car manufacturer
- Founded: 2004; 22 years ago in Luxembourg
- Founder: Guy Nègre
- Defunct: Bankruptcy on January 9, 2026
- Headquarters: Luxembourg City, Luxembourg
- Key people: Guy Nègre; Cyril Nègre
- Products: Compressed air car
- Website: http://mdi.lu/

Motor Development International SA (MDI) was a Franco-Luxembourgish company designing products in both mobility and energy storage using a compressed air engine.

The holding company was declared bankrupt by the Luxembourg court on January 9, 2026.

== Development history ==
Established by former DaimlerChrysler employee Guy Nègre — the Luxembourg company MDI, with its administrative and production departments based in Carros in southeastern France, has developed an environmentally friendly car engine that uses compressed air to push the pistons of the engine and move the car.

== Company history ==
=== 2004–2011 ===
According to MDI, were some fabrication and distribution licenses signed with companies in various countries including France, Germany, Spain, Portugal, Italy, New Zealand, Israel and South Africa. Zero Pollution Motors would like to make MDI vehicles in the United States. MDI Andina S.A wanted to sell the car in Colombia, Peru, Ecuador and Panama. The last one was CATECAR S.A in Switzerland which was about to start the first assembly line in the Bernese Jura, but the project is on hold (as so many others before) due to legal problems with MDI. Catecar purchased rights to produce and market MDI vehicles in Switzerland but MDI failed to produce the required technology. Catecar has now abandoned compressed air and has built prototype EVs.

MDI had also reached an agreement with Tata Motors, which was to produce and sell OneCAT cars in India. Tata Motors announced in May 2012 that they had assessed the design passing phase 1, the "proof of the technical concept" towards full production for the Indian market. Tata has moved onto phase 2, "completing detailed development of the compressed air engine into specific vehicle and stationary applications".

=== 2012 ===
After five years of testing and validation of the concept, MDI-designed engines were said to have been successfully integrated into Tata vehicles, and the air-powered "MiniCat" was promised to be on sale in India before the end of 2012. This was disputed in 2016 by MDI's CEO, Cyril Nègre, who said, "We never said that there will be any MiniCats in India. The deal we have is that Tata Motors has bought the exclusive licence of our Indian technology. But they’re going to produce their own car, not MDI cars — their own cars using our engines.”

=== 2016 ===
Guy Nègre passes away on June 24, 2016. MDI was one of eight finalists in the competition for a grant from the United Nations' Powering The Future We Want program, but ultimately lost to SINTEF.

=== 2017 ===
In February 2017 Dr. Tim Leverton, president and head at Advanced and Product Engineering at Tata revealed that it had completed the first phase of its project and the second stage was started a few years earlier. Tata was at a point of "starting industrialisation" with the first vehicles to be available by 2020. Other reports indicate Tata is also looking at reviving plans for a compressed air version of the Tata Nano, which had previously been under consideration as part of their collaboration with MDI.

=== 2020 ===
No sign of Tata AirCar in production.

=== 2023 ===
All mention of Tata AirCar on their website has been removed.

French companies CQFD AIR SOLUTIONS and MDI PROD are placed in compulsory liquidation.

=== 2026 ===
The holding company was declared bankrupt by the Luxembourg court on January 9, 2026.

== See also ==
- Compressed air car
- Air engine
- Fireless locomotive
