= Norma M2000 =

Sports Prototype race car

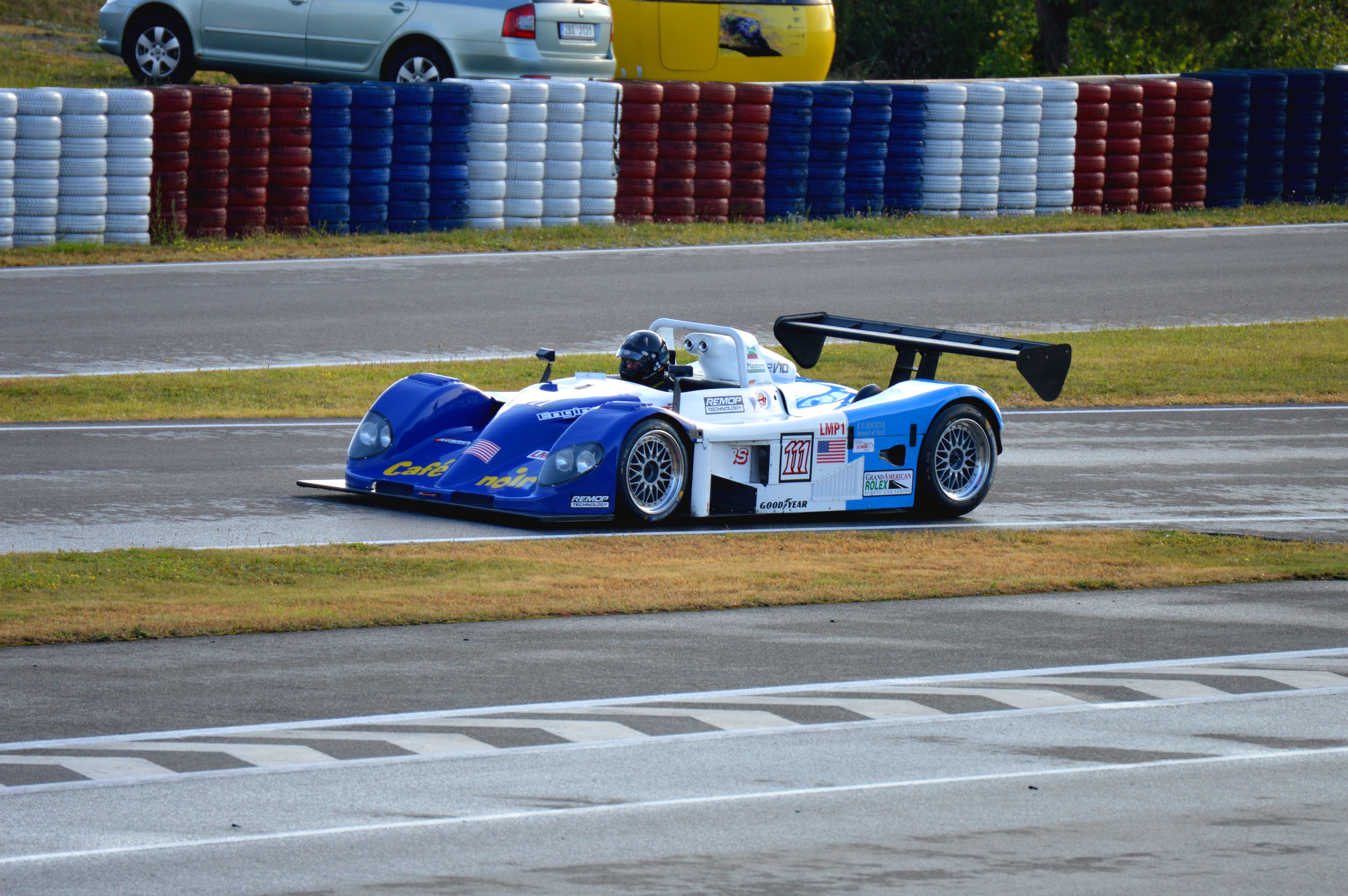
- Category: LMP900/Grand-Am SR/SRP
- Constructor: Norma
- Designers: Norbert Santos, Edouard Sézionale

Technical specifications
- Chassis: Carbon fibre monocoque
- Suspension: Double wishbones, push-rod actuated coil springs over shock absorbers, anti-roll bars
- Length: 4,610 mm (181 in)
- Width: 1,980 mm (78 in)
- Height: 1,020 mm (40 in)
- Axle track: 970 mm (38 in) (front), 770 mm (30 in) (rear)
- Wheelbase: 2,870 mm (113 in)
- Engine: Mader-BMW 4.0 L (240 cu in) 90° DOHC V8 naturally-aspirated mid-engined Ford 6.0 L (370 cu in) 90° DOHC V8 naturally-aspirated mid-engined longitudinally mounted
- Transmission: 6-speed manual
- Power: 500–621 hp (373–463 kW); 300–502 lb⋅ft (407–681 N⋅m)
- Weight: 956 kilograms (2,108 lb)

Competition history
- Debut: 2001 24 Hours of Daytona

The Norma M2000 is a sports prototype race car, designed, developed, and produced by French constructor Norma, for competition in sports car racing, between 2000 and 2003.
