= James Edmunds =

James Edmunds may refer to:

- James E. Edmunds (born 1970), Republican member of the Virginia House of Delegates
- James M. Edmunds (1810–1879), U.S. politician from Michigan
- James R. Edmunds Jr. (1890–1953), American architect
- James Edmunds (British politician) (1882–1962), British Member of Parliament for Cardiff East
- James Edmunds (Home and Away), fictional character from the Australian soap opera Home and Away
