= Frank Slayton =

American politician

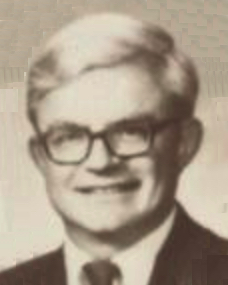

Member of the Virginia House of Delegates
- In office January 12, 1972 – January 13, 1988
- Preceded by: Howard Anderson
- Succeeded by: Mark Hagood
- Constituency: 28th district (1972–1982); 14th district (1982–1983); 60th district (1983–1988)

Personal details
- Born: Franklin Marshall Slayton; August 14, 1932 Richmond, Virginia, U.S.
- Died: October 29, 2013 (aged 81)
- Party: Democratic
- Spouse: Ruth Jean
- Education: University of Virginia

Military service
- Allegiance: United States
- Branch/service: United States Army
- Rank: Lieutenant colonel

Franklin Marshall Slayton (August 14, 1932 – October 29, 2013) was a Virginia lawyer, soldier and Democratic politician who served as a member of the Virginia House of Delegates (part-time) for 15 years, and later as a judge in Halifax County, Virginia.

== Early life ==
After attending the Halifax County public schools, Slayton attended the University of Virginia and University of Virginia Law School, from which he graduated in 1959, as did future U.S. Senator Ted Kennedy, who became a lifelong friend.

== Career ==
After admission to the Virginia bar, Slayton established a practice in South Boston, interrupted by a tour of duty in the U.S. Army, but which he continued for two decades in the Virginia National Guard, serving in the Judge Advocate General Corps and rising to the rank of lieutenant colonel.

Slayton first won election to the House of Delegates in 1972, and won re-election seven times (generally without opposition) until 1987, when 31 year old Republican Mark Hagood thwarted his re-election bid (but would be defeated by Ted Bennett, the former Halifax County Commonwealth's attorney as well as Slayton's law partner) two years later. In the House of Delegates, Slayton aligned with Richard Cranwell, and gained influence on the House Appropriations and Courts and Justice subcommittees.

After his defeat, Slayton used his legal skills to combat the redistricting following the 1990 census, which eliminated the traditional state senate district that included rural Halifax, Brunswick and Meckenburg counties (ironically held for decades by Mark Hagood's great-uncle James D. Hagood then by Howard P. Anderson), and instead associated Halifax county with urban and far more populous Portsmouth. Then, in 1995, Slayton ran as an independent for that senate seat, but despite strength in rural portions, lost to incumbent Louise Lucas. Another legal case that cemented Slayton's reputation in his community was his representation of Riverdale, Halifax County, Virginia businesses against the U.S. Army Corps of Engineers, which led to a multi-million dollar settlement (under seal) for severe flooding of the Dan River in Riverdale, following the corps' tree planting program to limit erosion.

In 1997, his former colleagues appointed Slayton as a Juvenile and Domestic Relations judge, where he served until retiring in 2003. Although Slayton suffered health issues in his final years, he was able to attend the swearing-in of his niece, Kimberley Slayton White, whom he had mentored before her prosecutorial career and who became the first female circuit judge of Virginia's 10th judicial district.

== Personal life ==
Slayton was survived by his wife, Ruth Jean Slayton, three children and many grandchildren.
