= Ted Bennett =

American politician

Member of the Virginia House of Delegates from the 60th district
- In office January 10, 1990 – January 9, 2002
- Preceded by: Mark Hagood
- Succeeded by: Clarke Hogan

Commonwealth's Attorney for Halifax County and South Boston
- In office January 1, 1976 – December 31, 1979
- Preceded by: Garnett Bledsoe
- Succeeded by: Howard P. Anderson Jr.

Personal details
- Born: William Weldon Bennett Jr. December 24, 1940 (age 85) Halifax, Virginia, U.S.
- Party: Democratic
- Education: University of Virginia (BA, JD)
- Occupation: Lawyer; politician

William Weldon "Ted" Bennett Jr. (born December 24, 1940, in Halifax, Virginia) is an American politician. A Democrat, he served in the Virginia House of Delegates 1990–2002, representing the 60th district.

== Early life ==
Bennett was born in Halifax County, Virginia. He attended the University of Virginia, receiving a B.A. degree in 1963 and a J.D. in 1966. He then went into law practice in Halifax County.

== Political career ==
Bennett served one term (1976–80) as Commonwealth's Attorney for Halifax County and the independent city of South Boston.

He was first elected to the House of Delegates in 1989. Bennett was co-chair of the Science and Technology committee 2000–01. He did not run again for the seat in 2001.

On March 13, 2009, Bennett announced that he was running for reelection to his old seat in the 60th district after his Republican successor, Clarke Hogan, announced his own retirement. However, Bennett announced a month later that he was withdrawing from the race.
