= Mark Hagood =

American politician (born 1956)

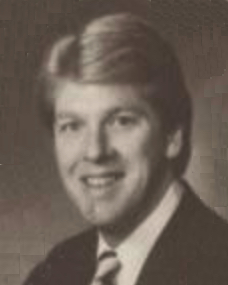
- Official portrait, 1988

Member of the Virginia House of Delegates from the 60th district
- In office January 13, 1988 – January 10, 1990
- Preceded by: Frank Slayton
- Succeeded by: Ted Bennett

Personal details
- Born: Mark William Hagood; June 2, 1956 (age 70) Clover, Virginia, U.S.
- Party: Republican
- Relatives: James D. Hagood (great-uncle)
- Education: University of Richmond

Mark William Hagood (born June 2, 1956) was an American politician who served one term as a Republican member of the Virginia House of Delegates. He was elected in 1987, defeating long-term incumbent Frank Slayton, but lost reelection two years later.

Hagood is the grand-nephew of James D. Hagood, who long served as a member of the state senate.
