= 2000 Grand American Road Racing Championship =

1st season of the racing series organized by Grand-Am

Seasons
- ← 1999 (USRRC) 2001 →

The 2000 Grand American Road Racing Championship was the inaugural season of the Grand American Road Racing Championship run by the Grand American Road Racing Association. The season involved five classes: Sports Racing Prototypes I and II (SR-I and SR-II) and three Grand Touring classes referred to as GTO, GTU, and AGT. 9 races were run from February 5, 2000 to August 17, 2000.

The Grand American Road Racing Championship officially replaced the brief United States Road Racing Championship which had folded during their 1999 season. The Grand American series used similar rules, although the class names were all changed.

== Schedule ==
Rnd	Race	Length	Class	Circuit	Location	Date
1	(United States) Rolex 24 at Daytona	24 Hours	Both	Daytona International Speedway	Daytona, Florida	February 5 February 6
2	(United States) Phoenix Sun Automotive 200	200 Miles	Both	Phoenix International Raceway	Avondale, Arizona	April 22
3	(United States) Nextel 250	250 Miles	Both	Homestead-Miami Speedway	Homestead, Florida	April 30
4	(United States) Dodge Dealers Grand Prix^{†}	150 Miles	SR	Lime Rock Park	Lakeville, Connecticut	May 29
4	(United States) Dodge Dealers Grand Prix^{†}	150 Miles	GT	Lime Rock Park	Lakeville, Connecticut	May 29
5	(United States) U.S. Road Racing Classic	250 Miles	Both	Mid-Ohio Sports Car Course	Lexington, Ohio	June 4
6	(United States) Paul Revere 250	250 Miles	Both	Daytona International Speedway	Daytona, Florida	June 29
7	(United States) Sargento Road America 500	500 Miles	Both	Road America	Elkhart Lake, Wisconsin	July 9
8	(Canada) Le Grand Prix de Trois-Rivières	225 km	Both	Circuit Trois-Rivières	Trois-Rivières, Quebec	July 30
9	(United States) Bosch Sports Car Summerfest	6 Hours	Both	Watkins Glen International	Watkins Glen, New York	August 17

† - Two separate individual races were held for the GT classes and SR classes for an equal distance.

The Grand American Racing Association officially announced an eight race schedule for 2000. Trois-Rivières was added to the schedule in January. The Paul Revere 250 and the Road America 500 were also rounds of the SportsRacing World Cup. Grand-Am intended to include two SportsRacing World Cup events onto their schedule. However, after the initial announcement in 1999, Grand-Am opted instead to not include the European rounds in their championship as the majority of teams were not interested.

== Entry list ==
=== SRI ===
Team	Chassis	Engine	Tyre	No.	Drivers	Rnds.
(Switzerland) Autosport Racing	Ferrari 333 SP	Ferrari F310E 4.0 L V12	P	00	(Switzerland) Enzo Calderari	1
(Switzerland) Autosport Racing	Ferrari 333 SP	Ferrari F310E 4.0 L V12	P	00	(Italy) Angelo Zadra	1
(Switzerland) Autosport Racing	Ferrari 333 SP	Ferrari F310E 4.0 L V12	P	00	(Italy) Marco Zadra	1
(Switzerland) Autosport Racing	Ferrari 333 SP	Ferrari F310E 4.0 L V12	P	00	(Switzerland) Lilian Bryner	1
(Switzerland) Autosport Racing	Ferrari 333 SP	Ferrari F310E 4.0 L V12	P	00	(Sweden) Carl Rosenblad	1
(Canada) Multimatic Motorsports	Lola B98/10	Ford Cosworth XB 2.6 L Turbo V8	P	06	(Canada) Scott Maxwell	1
(Canada) Multimatic Motorsports	Lola B98/10	Ford Cosworth XB 2.6 L Turbo V8	P	06	(Finland) Harri Toivonen	1
(Canada) Multimatic Motorsports	Lola B98/10	Ford Cosworth XB 2.6 L Turbo V8	P	06	(Canada) John Graham	1
(United States) Banshee Racing	Banshee WSC	Ford 4.6 L V8	G	08	(Canada) Ernie Lader	7
(United States) Banshee Racing	Banshee WSC	Ford 4.6 L V8	G	08	(United States) Tony Ave	7
(United States) Brown Motorsports	Spice HC94 (1) Ferrari 333 SP (5)	Chevrolet 5.0 L V8 (1) Ferrari F310E 4.0 L V12 (5)	P	2 9	(United States) Bobby Brown	1, 5
(United States) Brown Motorsports	Spice HC94 (1) Ferrari 333 SP (5)	Chevrolet 5.0 L V8 (1) Ferrari F310E 4.0 L V12 (5)	P	2 9	(United States) Norman Goldrich	1
(United States) Brown Motorsports	Spice HC94 (1) Ferrari 333 SP (5)	Chevrolet 5.0 L V8 (1) Ferrari F310E 4.0 L V12 (5)	P	2 9	(United States) Randy Lenz	1
(United States) Brown Motorsports	Spice HC94 (1) Ferrari 333 SP (5)	Chevrolet 5.0 L V8 (1) Ferrari F310E 4.0 L V12 (5)	P	2 9	(Sweden) Stanley Dickens	5
(United States) Team Cadillac	Cadillac Northstar LMP	Cadillac Northstar 4.0 L Turbo V8	P	5	(Italy) Max Angelelli	1
(United States) Team Cadillac	Cadillac Northstar LMP	Cadillac Northstar 4.0 L Turbo V8	P	5	(South Africa) Wayne Taylor	1
(United States) Team Cadillac	Cadillac Northstar LMP	Cadillac Northstar 4.0 L Turbo V8	P	5	(Belgium) Eric van de Poele	1
(United States) Team Cadillac	Cadillac Northstar LMP	Cadillac Northstar 4.0 L Turbo V8	P	6	(United States) Butch Leitzinger	1
(United States) Team Cadillac	Cadillac Northstar LMP	Cadillac Northstar 4.0 L Turbo V8	P	6	(United Kingdom) Andy Wallace	1
(United States) Team Cadillac	Cadillac Northstar LMP	Cadillac Northstar 4.0 L Turbo V8	P	6	(France) Franck Lagorce	1
(United States) Philip Creighton Motorsport Ltd.	Riley & Scott Mk III (1) Lola B2K/10 (2-8)	Ford (Roush) 6.0 L V8	G	8	(United States) Scott Schubot	1, 3–8
(United States) Philip Creighton Motorsport Ltd.	Riley & Scott Mk III (1) Lola B2K/10 (2-8)	Ford (Roush) 6.0 L V8	G	8	(United States) Henry Camferdam	1
(United States) Philip Creighton Motorsport Ltd.	Riley & Scott Mk III (1) Lola B2K/10 (2-8)	Ford (Roush) 6.0 L V8	G	8	(United States) Duncan Dayton	1
(United States) Philip Creighton Motorsport Ltd.	Riley & Scott Mk III (1) Lola B2K/10 (2-8)	Ford (Roush) 6.0 L V8	G	8	(United Kingdom) John Burton	1
(United States) Philip Creighton Motorsport Ltd.	Riley & Scott Mk III (1) Lola B2K/10 (2-8)	Ford (Roush) 6.0 L V8	G	8	(United Kingdom) Oliver Gavin	3
(United States) Philip Creighton Motorsport Ltd.	Riley & Scott Mk III (1) Lola B2K/10 (2-8)	Ford (Roush) 6.0 L V8	G	8	(United States) Mark Simo	4
(United States) Philip Creighton Motorsport Ltd.	Riley & Scott Mk III (1) Lola B2K/10 (2-8)	Ford (Roush) 6.0 L V8	G	8	(United Kingdom) Andy Wallace	5
(United States) Philip Creighton Motorsport Ltd.	Riley & Scott Mk III (1) Lola B2K/10 (2-8)	Ford (Roush) 6.0 L V8	G	8	(United States) Butch Leitzinger	6–7
(United States) Philip Creighton Motorsport Ltd.	Riley & Scott Mk III (1) Lola B2K/10 (2-8)	Ford (Roush) 6.0 L V8	G	8	(Canada) Claude Bourbonnais	8
(United States) Risi Competizione	Ferrari 333 SP	Ferrari F310E 4.0 L V12	P G	12	(Italy) Mimmo Schiattarella	All
(United States) Risi Competizione	Ferrari 333 SP	Ferrari F310E 4.0 L V12	P G	12	(Germany) Ralf Kelleners	1–6, 8–9
(United States) Risi Competizione	Ferrari 333 SP	Ferrari F310E 4.0 L V12	P G	12	(Italy) Alex Caffi	1
(United States) Risi Competizione	Ferrari 333 SP	Ferrari F310E 4.0 L V12	P G	12	(United Kingdom) Allan McNish	1
(United States) Risi Competizione	Ferrari 333 SP	Ferrari F310E 4.0 L V12	P G	12	(Belgium) Eric van de Poele	7, 9
(United States) Dyson Racing Team	Riley & Scott Mk III	Ford 5.5 L V8	G	16	(United Kingdom) James Weaver	2–9
(United States) Dyson Racing Team	Riley & Scott Mk III	Ford 5.5 L V8	G	16	(United Kingdom) Andy Wallace	2, 6–7, 9
(United States) Dyson Racing Team	Riley & Scott Mk III	Ford 5.5 L V8	G	16	(United States) John Paul, Jr.	3
(United States) Dyson Racing Team	Riley & Scott Mk III	Ford 5.5 L V8	G	16	(United States) Butch Leitzinger	4–5, 8–9
(United States) Dyson Racing Team	Riley & Scott Mk III	Ford-Lincoln 5.5 L V8	G	20	(United States) Elliott Forbes-Robinson	All
(United States) Dyson Racing Team	Riley & Scott Mk III	Ford-Lincoln 5.5 L V8	G	20	(United States) Rob Dyson	1–2, 4, 6–7, 9
(United States) Dyson Racing Team	Riley & Scott Mk III	Ford-Lincoln 5.5 L V8	G	20	(United Kingdom) James Weaver	1
(United States) Dyson Racing Team	Riley & Scott Mk III	Ford-Lincoln 5.5 L V8	G	20	(Italy) Max Papis	1
(United States) Dyson Racing Team	Riley & Scott Mk III	Ford-Lincoln 5.5 L V8	G	20	(United States) John Paul, Jr.	2, 5–9
(United States) Dyson Racing Team	Riley & Scott Mk III	Ford-Lincoln 5.5 L V8	G	20	(Australia) David Besnard	3
(United States) Hybrid Motorsports	Riley & Scott Mk III	Ford 5.1 L V8	Y	17	(United States) Mark Simo	1–3, 6, 9
(United States) Hybrid Motorsports	Riley & Scott Mk III	Ford 5.1 L V8	Y	17	(United States) Chris Bingham	1–3, 6
(United States) Hybrid Motorsports	Riley & Scott Mk III	Ford 5.1 L V8	Y	17	(United States) Boris Said	1
(United States) Hybrid Motorsports	Riley & Scott Mk III	Ford 5.1 L V8	Y	17	(United States) Rick Sutherland	1
(United States) Hybrid Motorsports	Riley & Scott Mk III	Ford 5.1 L V8	Y	17	(Germany) Norman Simon	9
(United States) Hybrid Motorsports	Riley & Scott Mk III	Ford 5.1 L V8	Y	17	(Germany) Michael Lauer	9
(United States) Doran Lista Racing	Ferrari 333 SP	Ferrari F310E 4.0 L V12 (Rd. 1) Judd GV4 4.0 L V10 (Rd. 2-9)	M Y	27	(Belgium) Didier Theys	All
(United States) Doran Lista Racing	Ferrari 333 SP	Ferrari F310E 4.0 L V12 (Rd. 1) Judd GV4 4.0 L V10 (Rd. 2-9)	M Y	27	(Switzerland) Fredy Lienhard	1–2, 4, 7, 9
(United States) Doran Lista Racing	Ferrari 333 SP	Ferrari F310E 4.0 L V12 (Rd. 1) Judd GV4 4.0 L V10 (Rd. 2-9)	M Y	27	(Italy) Mauro Baldi	1, 3, 5, 7
(United States) Doran Lista Racing	Ferrari 333 SP	Ferrari F310E 4.0 L V12 (Rd. 1) Judd GV4 4.0 L V10 (Rd. 2-9)	M Y	27	(Canada) Ross Bentley	1, 6, 8–9
(United States) Intersport Racing	Riley & Scott Mk III	Ford 5.1 L V8	G	29	(United States) John Mirro	1, 5–6
(United States) Intersport Racing	Riley & Scott Mk III	Ford 5.1 L V8	G	29	(United States) Andy Petery	1
(United States) Intersport Racing	Riley & Scott Mk III	Ford 5.1 L V8	G	29	(United States) Craig Carter	1
(United States) Intersport Racing	Riley & Scott Mk III	Ford 5.1 L V8	G	29	(United States) Gerry Green	1
(United States) Intersport Racing	Riley & Scott Mk III	Ford 5.1 L V8	G	29	(United States) Joel Field	4–6
(United States) Intersport Racing	Riley & Scott Mk III	Ford 5.1 L V8	G	29	(United States) Sam Brown	4
(United States) Intersport Racing	Riley & Scott Mk III	Ford 5.1 L V8	G	29	(United States) Jon Field	5
(United States) Intersport Racing	Lola B98/10 (Rd. 1-6) Lola B2K/10 (Rd. 7-9)	Ford 5.1 L V8 (Rd. 1-6) Judd GV4 4.0 L V10 (Rd. 7-9)	G Y	37	(United States) Jon Field	All
(United States) Intersport Racing	Lola B98/10 (Rd. 1-6) Lola B2K/10 (Rd. 7-9)	Ford 5.1 L V8 (Rd. 1-6) Judd GV4 4.0 L V10 (Rd. 7-9)	G Y	37	(United States) Dale Whittington	1–2
(United States) Intersport Racing	Lola B98/10 (Rd. 1-6) Lola B2K/10 (Rd. 7-9)	Ford 5.1 L V8 (Rd. 1-6) Judd GV4 4.0 L V10 (Rd. 7-9)	G Y	37	(United States) Don Whittington	1
(United States) Intersport Racing	Lola B98/10 (Rd. 1-6) Lola B2K/10 (Rd. 7-9)	Ford 5.1 L V8 (Rd. 1-6) Judd GV4 4.0 L V10 (Rd. 7-9)	G Y	37	(United States) Butch Brickell	3
(United States) Intersport Racing	Lola B98/10 (Rd. 1-6) Lola B2K/10 (Rd. 7-9)	Ford 5.1 L V8 (Rd. 1-6) Judd GV4 4.0 L V10 (Rd. 7-9)	G Y	37	(United States) John Mirro	4
(United States) Intersport Racing	Lola B98/10 (Rd. 1-6) Lola B2K/10 (Rd. 7-9)	Ford 5.1 L V8 (Rd. 1-6) Judd GV4 4.0 L V10 (Rd. 7-9)	G Y	37	(United Kingdom) Oliver Gavin	5, 7–9
(Germany) Konrad Motorsport	Lola B98/10	Ford 6.0 L V8	D	31	(Netherlands) Jan Lammers	1
(Germany) Konrad Motorsport	Lola B98/10	Ford 6.0 L V8	D	31	(Germany) Sascha Maassen	1
(Germany) Konrad Motorsport	Lola B98/10	Ford 6.0 L V8	D	31	(Austria) Franz Konrad	1
(United States) Johansson-Matthews Racing	Reynard 2KQ-LM	Judd GV4 4.0L V10	Y	36	(Sweden) Stefan Johansson	1
(United States) Johansson-Matthews Racing	Reynard 2KQ-LM	Judd GV4 4.0L V10	Y	36	(United Kingdom) Guy Smith	1
(United States) Johansson-Matthews Racing	Reynard 2KQ-LM	Judd GV4 4.0L V10	Y	36	(United States) Jim Matthews	1
(United States) Johansson-Matthews Racing	Reynard 2KQ-LM	Judd GV4 4.0L V10	Y	36	(United States) Memo Gidley	1
(United States) Champion Racing	Lola B2K/10	Porsche 3.6 L Turbo Flat-6	M	38	(United States) Dorsey Schroeder	9
(United States) Champion Racing	Lola B2K/10	Porsche 3.6 L Turbo Flat-6	M	38	(France) Bob Wollek	9
(United States) Champion Racing	Lola B2K/10	Porsche 3.6 L Turbo Flat-6	M	38	(Germany) Dirk Müller	9
(Belgium) EBRT/Schroeder Motorsport	Pilbeam MP84	Nissan DOHC 3.0 L V6	D	42	(New Zealand) Rob Wilson	1
(Belgium) EBRT/Schroeder Motorsport	Pilbeam MP84	Nissan DOHC 3.0 L V6	D	42	(United Kingdom) Martin Henderson	1
(Belgium) EBRT/Schroeder Motorsport	Pilbeam MP84	Nissan DOHC 3.0 L V6	D	42	(United Kingdom) Martyn Konig	1
(Belgium) EBRT/Schroeder Motorsport	Pilbeam MP84	Nissan DOHC 3.0 L V6	D	42	(United States) Jake Ulrich	1
(United States) RaceStar Motorsports	Spice SE90	Chevrolet 5.0 L V8	P	47	(United States) Richard McDill	1
(United States) RaceStar Motorsports	Spice SE90	Chevrolet 5.0 L V8	P	47	(United States) Todd Vallancourt	1
(United States) RaceStar Motorsports	Spice SE90	Chevrolet 5.0 L V8	P	47	(United States) John G. Thomas	1
(United States) RaceStar Motorsports	Spice SE90	Chevrolet 5.0 L V8	P	47	(United States) Les Vallarano	1
(United States) RaceStar Motorsports	Spice SE90	Chevrolet 5.0 L V8	P	47	(United States) Ken Stiver	1
(United States) Jacobs Motorsports	Kudzu DLM-4	Chevrolet 5.1 L V8	P	60	(United States) Michael Jacobs	1, 4
(United States) Jacobs Motorsports	Kudzu DLM-4	Chevrolet 5.1 L V8	P	60	(United States) Frank Del Vecchio	1, 4
(United States) Jacobs Motorsports	Kudzu DLM-4	Chevrolet 5.1 L V8	P	60	(United States) Steven Lynn	1
(United States) Jacobs Motorsports	Kudzu DLM-4	Chevrolet 5.1 L V8	P	60	(United States) Ray Snowdon	1
(United States) Jacobs Motorsports	Kudzu DLM-4	Chevrolet 5.1 L V8	P	60	(United States) Steve Algrin	1
(United States) Jacobs Motorsports	Kudzu DLM-4	Chevrolet 5.1 L V8	P	60	(United States) Richard Geck	1
(United States) Downing/Atlanta Racing	Kudzu DLY	Mazda 4-Rotor	G	63	(United States) Jim Downing	1, 3–7, 9
(United States) Downing/Atlanta Racing	Kudzu DLY	Mazda 4-Rotor	G	63	(United States) Steve Pelke	1, 3
(United States) Downing/Atlanta Racing	Kudzu DLY	Mazda 4-Rotor	G	63	(United States) Howard Katz	1, 4, 6–7, 9
(United States) Downing/Atlanta Racing	Kudzu DLY	Mazda 4-Rotor	G	63	(United States) Chris Ronson	1
(United States) Downing/Atlanta Racing	Kudzu DLY	Mazda 4-Rotor	G	63	(United States) A.J. Smith	5, 9
(United States) Robinson Racing	Riley & Scott Mk III	Chevrolet 6.0 L V8 Judd GV4 4.0L V10	G	74	(United States) Jack Baldwin	All
(United States) Robinson Racing	Riley & Scott Mk III	Chevrolet 6.0 L V8 Judd GV4 4.0L V10	G	74	(United States) Irv Hoerr	1–3
(United States) Robinson Racing	Riley & Scott Mk III	Chevrolet 6.0 L V8 Judd GV4 4.0L V10	G	74	(United States) George Robinson	1, 4–9
(United States) Robinson Racing	Riley & Scott Mk III	Chevrolet 6.0 L V8 Judd GV4 4.0L V10	G	74	(United States) Hurley Haywood	1, 7
(France) Sezio Florida Racing	Norma M2000-01	BMW (Mader) 4.0 L V8	P	78	(France) Patrice Roussel	1, 3, 6
(France) Sezio Florida Racing	Norma M2000-01	BMW (Mader) 4.0 L V8	P	78	(France) Edouard Sezionale	1, 3, 6
(France) Sezio Florida Racing	Norma M2000-01	BMW (Mader) 4.0 L V8	P	78	(United States) A.J. Smith	1
(United States) TRV Motorsport	Riley & Scott Mk III	Chevrolet 5.0 L V8	P	95	(United States) Tom Volk	1, 3, 5–7, 9
(United States) TRV Motorsport	Riley & Scott Mk III	Chevrolet 5.0 L V8	P	95	(United States) Barry Waddell	1
(United States) TRV Motorsport	Riley & Scott Mk III	Chevrolet 5.0 L V8	P	95	(United States) Peter Boss	1
(United States) TRV Motorsport	Riley & Scott Mk III	Chevrolet 5.0 L V8	P	95	(United States) Richard Valentine	1
(United States) TRV Motorsport	Riley & Scott Mk III	Chevrolet 5.0 L V8	P	95	(Canada) Ross Bentley	2
(United States) TRV Motorsport	Riley & Scott Mk III	Chevrolet 5.0 L V8	P	95	(United States) Jeret Schroeder	5–7
(United States) TRV Motorsport	Riley & Scott Mk III	Chevrolet 5.0 L V8	P	95	(Italy) Giorgio Vinella	7
(United States) TRV Motorsport	Riley & Scott Mk III	Chevrolet 5.0 L V8	P	95	(United States) Craig Carter	9
(United States) TRV Motorsport	Riley & Scott Mk III	Chevrolet 5.0 L V8	P	95	(United States) Andy Petery	9

=== SRII ===
Team	Chassis	Engine	Tyre	No.	Drivers	Rnds.
(United States) TRP Racing	Lola B2K/40	Nissan 3.0 L V6	Y	6	(United States) Gary Tiller	3, 5–7, 9
(United States) TRP Racing	Lola B2K/40	Nissan 3.0 L V6	Y	6	(United States) Brent Sherman	3
(United States) TRP Racing	Lola B2K/40	Nissan 3.0 L V6	Y	6	(United States) Gary Gibson	5
(United States) TRP Racing	Lola B2K/40	Nissan 3.0 L V6	Y	6	(United States) John Macaluso	6, 8–9
(United States) TRP Racing	Lola B2K/40	Nissan 3.0 L V6	Y	6	(United States) Andy Lally	7
(United States) TRP Racing	Lola B2K/40	Nissan 3.0 L V6	Y	6	(Canada) Paul Macey	8
(United States) TRP Racing	Lola B2K/40	Nissan 3.0 L V6	Y	6	(United States) Buddy Rice	9
(United States) Archangel Motorsport Services	Magnum SC205 (2) Lola B2K/40 (3-9)	Chevrolet 4.5 L V8 (2) Nissan 3.0 L V6 (3-9)	G A	22	(United States) Larry Oberto	2–9
(United States) Archangel Motorsport Services	Magnum SC205 (2) Lola B2K/40 (3-9)	Chevrolet 4.5 L V8 (2) Nissan 3.0 L V6 (3-9)	G A	22	(United States) Ryan Hampton	2–9
(United States) Archangel Motorsport Services	Magnum SC205 (2) Lola B2K/40 (3-9)	Chevrolet 4.5 L V8 (2) Nissan 3.0 L V6 (3-9)	G A	22	(Canada) Paul Macey	7, 9
(Italy) Tampolli Raffaelle Engineering	Tampolli SR2 RTA-99	Alfa Romeo 3.0 L V6	P	51	(Sweden) Niklas Loven	6–7
(Italy) Tampolli Raffaelle Engineering	Tampolli SR2 RTA-99	Alfa Romeo 3.0 L V6	P	51	(United States) B. J. Zacharias	6–7
(Italy) Tampolli Raffaelle Engineering	Tampolli SR2 RTA-99	Alfa Romeo 3.0 L V6	P	52	(Portugal) Bernardo Sá Nogueira	6–7
(Italy) Tampolli Raffaelle Engineering	Tampolli SR2 RTA-99	Alfa Romeo 3.0 L V6	P	52	(Germany) Gustl Spreng	6
(Italy) Tampolli Raffaelle Engineering	Tampolli SR2 RTA-99	Alfa Romeo 3.0 L V6	P	52	(United States) John Hertzog	7
(United States) Team Spencer Motorsports	Kudzu DLM	Mazda 2.0 L 3-Rotor	G	62	(United States) Rich Grupp	2–9
(United States) Team Spencer Motorsports	Kudzu DLM	Mazda 2.0 L 3-Rotor	G	62	(United States) Dennis Spencer	2–9
(United States) Team Spencer Motorsports	Kudzu DLM	Mazda 2.0 L 3-Rotor	G	62	(United States) Ralph Thomas	9
(United Kingdom) Redman Bright	Pilbeam MP84	Nissan 3.0 L V6	A	68	(United Kingdom) Mark Smithson	6–7
(United Kingdom) Redman Bright	Pilbeam MP84	Nissan 3.0 L V6	A	68	(United Kingdom) Peter Owen	6–7
(United Kingdom) Redman Bright	Pilbeam MP84	Nissan 3.0 L V6	A	68	(United Kingdom) Brian Redman	6
(United Kingdom) Redman Bright	Pilbeam MP84	Nissan 3.0 L V6	A	69	(United States) Marc Bunting	6–7
(United Kingdom) Redman Bright	Pilbeam MP84	Nissan 3.0 L V6	A	69	(United States) Chuck Goldsborough	6–7
(United Kingdom) Redman Bright	Pilbeam MP84	Nissan 3.0 L V6	A	69	(Germany) Marc Lauer	7
(United States) Snow/Schumacher Racing	Lola B2K/40	Nissan 3.0 L V6	Y	99	(United States) Martin Snow	2–3, 5–7, 9
(United States) Snow/Schumacher Racing	Lola B2K/40	Nissan 3.0 L V6	Y	99	(United States) Stu Hayner	2, 9
(United States) Snow/Schumacher Racing	Lola B2K/40	Nissan 3.0 L V6	Y	99	(United States) Larry Schumacher	3, 5–7, 9

=== GTO ===
Team	Chassis	Engine	Tyre	No.	Drivers	Rnds.
(Canada) Doncaster Racing	Porsche 993 GT2 R	Porsche 3.6 L Turbo Flat-6	P	0	(Canada) Greg Wilkins	2, 5, 9
(Canada) Doncaster Racing	Porsche 993 GT2 R	Porsche 3.6 L Turbo Flat-6	P	0	(Canada) David Lacey	2, 5, 9
(Canada) Doncaster Racing	Porsche 993 GT2 R	Porsche 3.6 L Turbo Flat-6	P	0	(Canada) Peter Czapka	9
(Germany) Roock Racing (United States) Roock/DM Motorsports	Porsche 993 GT2	Porsche 3.8 L Turbo Flat-6	Y	03	(Germany) Claudia Hürtgen	1
(Germany) Roock Racing (United States) Roock/DM Motorsports	Porsche 993 GT2	Porsche 3.8 L Turbo Flat-6	Y	03	(Germany) Hubert Haupt	1
(Germany) Roock Racing (United States) Roock/DM Motorsports	Porsche 993 GT2	Porsche 3.8 L Turbo Flat-6	Y	03	(Japan) Hisashi Wada	1
(Germany) Roock Racing (United States) Roock/DM Motorsports	Porsche 993 GT2	Porsche 3.8 L Turbo Flat-6	Y	03	(United Kingdom) Robert Nearn	1
(Germany) Roock Racing (United States) Roock/DM Motorsports	Porsche 993 GT2	Porsche 3.8 L Turbo Flat-6	Y	03	(United Kingdom) Nigel Smith	1
(Germany) Roock Racing (United States) Roock/DM Motorsports	Porsche 993 GT2	Porsche 3.8 L Turbo Flat-6	Y	03	(United States) Stephen Earle	1
(Germany) Roock Racing (United States) Roock/DM Motorsports	Porsche 993 GT2	Porsche 3.8 L Turbo Flat-6	Y	04	(United States) Spencer Trenery	1, 9
(Germany) Roock Racing (United States) Roock/DM Motorsports	Porsche 993 GT2	Porsche 3.8 L Turbo Flat-6	Y	04	(United States) Vic Rice	1, 9
(Germany) Roock Racing (United States) Roock/DM Motorsports	Porsche 993 GT2	Porsche 3.8 L Turbo Flat-6	Y	04	(United States) Zak Brown	1
(Germany) Roock Racing (United States) Roock/DM Motorsports	Porsche 993 GT2	Porsche 3.8 L Turbo Flat-6	Y	04	(United Kingdom) David Warnock	1
(Germany) Roock Racing (United States) Roock/DM Motorsports	Porsche 993 GT2	Porsche 3.8 L Turbo Flat-6	Y	04	(United States) Stephen Earle	9
(Germany) Roock Racing (United States) Roock/DM Motorsports	Porsche 993 GT2	Porsche 3.8 L Turbo Flat-6	Y	25	(Germany) Hubert Haupt	9
(Germany) Roock Racing (United States) Roock/DM Motorsports	Porsche 993 GT2	Porsche 3.8 L Turbo Flat-6	Y	25	(United States) Cort Wagner	9
(Germany) Roock Racing (United States) Roock/DM Motorsports	Porsche 993 GT2	Porsche 3.8 L Turbo Flat-6	Y	25	(United States) Mark Montgomery	9
(United States) G & W Motorsports	Porsche 993 GT2 Evo	Porsche 3.6 L Turbo Flat-6	D	07	(United States) Chris Cook	4–5
(United States) G & W Motorsports	Porsche 993 GT2 Evo	Porsche 3.6 L Turbo Flat-6	D	07	(United States) Danny Marshall	4, 6, 8–9
(United States) G & W Motorsports	Porsche 993 GT2 Evo	Porsche 3.6 L Turbo Flat-6	D	07	(United States) Steve Marshall	5–6, 8–9
(United States) G & W Motorsports	Porsche 993 GT2 Evo	Porsche 3.6 L Turbo Flat-6	D	07	(United States) Hurley Haywood	9
(United States) Rocketsports Racing	Jaguar XKR	Ford OHV 4.0 L V8	BF	1	(United States) Paul Gentilozzi	7
(United States) Corvette Racing	Chevrolet Corvette C5-R	Chevrolet 6.0 L V8	G	3	(Canada) Ron Fellows	1
(United States) Corvette Racing	Chevrolet Corvette C5-R	Chevrolet 6.0 L V8	G	3	(United Kingdom) Justin Bell	1
(United States) Corvette Racing	Chevrolet Corvette C5-R	Chevrolet 6.0 L V8	G	3	(United States) Chris Kneifel	1
(United States) Corvette Racing	Chevrolet Corvette C5-R	Chevrolet 6.0 L V8	G	4	(United States) Kelly Collins	1
(United States) Corvette Racing	Chevrolet Corvette C5-R	Chevrolet 6.0 L V8	G	4	(United States) Andy Pilgrim	1
(United States) Corvette Racing	Chevrolet Corvette C5-R	Chevrolet 6.0 L V8	G	4	(France) Franck Fréon	1
(United States) RS Motorsports	Porsche 993 Carrera RSR	Porsche 3.6 L Turbo Flat-6	P	3	(United States) Bob Stefanowicz	9
(United States) RS Motorsports	Porsche 993 Carrera RSR	Porsche 3.6 L Turbo Flat-6	P	3	(United States) Dennis Pavlina	9
(United States) Saleen/Allen Speedlab	Saleen Mustang SR	Ford 5.8 L V8	P	4	(United States) John Kohler	7
(United States) Saleen/Allen Speedlab	Saleen Mustang	Ford 8.0 L V8	P	5	(United States) Terry Borcheller	2–9
(United States) Saleen/Allen Speedlab	Saleen Mustang	Ford 8.0 L V8	P	5	(United States) Ron Johnson	2–9
(Canada) 89 Racing Team	Ford Mustang	Ford 5.8 L V8	D	10	(Canada) Jocelyn Hebert	8
(Canada) 89 Racing Team	Ford Mustang	Ford 5.8 L V8	D	10	(Canada) Pierre Bareil	8
(United States) Jack Cauley Chevrolet	Chevrolet Corvette C5	Chevrolet 7.0 L V8	P	14	(United States) R. K. Smith	1
(United States) Jack Cauley Chevrolet	Chevrolet Corvette C5	Chevrolet 7.0 L V8	P	14	(United States) Jeff Nowicki	1
(United States) Jack Cauley Chevrolet	Chevrolet Corvette C5	Chevrolet 7.0 L V8	P	14	(United States) Bill Lester	1
(United States) Jack Cauley Chevrolet	Chevrolet Corvette C5	Chevrolet 7.0 L V8	P	14	(United States) John Heinricy	1
(United States) Kreider Motorsports	Chevrolet Corvette C4	Chevrolet 5.5 L V8	G	15	(United States) Daniel Urrutia	1, 6
(United States) Kreider Motorsports	Chevrolet Corvette C4	Chevrolet 5.5 L V8	G	15	(Argentina) Gaston Aguirre	1
(United States) Kreider Motorsports	Chevrolet Corvette C4	Chevrolet 5.5 L V8	G	15	(United States) Scott Watkins	1
(United States) Kreider Motorsports	Chevrolet Corvette C4	Chevrolet 5.5 L V8	G	15	(United States) René Villeneuve	1
(United States) Kreider Motorsports	Chevrolet Corvette C4	Chevrolet 5.5 L V8	G	15	(United States) Luis Sereix	6
(United States) Broadfoot/Press Racing (United States) Broadfoot Racing	Porsche 944 Turbo	Porsche 2.8 L Turbo I4	D	25	(United States) Dave Rodenroth	1, 3–6
(United States) Broadfoot/Press Racing (United States) Broadfoot Racing	Porsche 944 Turbo	Porsche 2.8 L Turbo I4	D	25	(United States) Simon Gregg	1
(United States) Broadfoot/Press Racing (United States) Broadfoot Racing	Porsche 944 Turbo	Porsche 2.8 L Turbo I4	D	25	(United States) Mike Borkowski	1
(United States) Broadfoot/Press Racing (United States) Broadfoot Racing	Porsche 944 Turbo	Porsche 2.8 L Turbo I4	D	25	(United States) Mark Montgomery	2–6
(United States) Broadfoot/Press Racing (United States) Broadfoot Racing	Porsche 944 Turbo	Porsche 2.8 L Turbo I4	D	25	(United States) Scott Deware	2
(United States) Broadfoot/Press Racing (United States) Broadfoot Racing	Porsche 944 Turbo	Porsche 2.8 L Turbo I4	D	26	(United States) Scott Bowe	1*
(United States) Broadfoot/Press Racing (United States) Broadfoot Racing	Porsche 944 Turbo	Porsche 2.8 L Turbo I4	D	26	(United States) Simon Gregg	3
(United States) Broadfoot/Press Racing (United States) Broadfoot Racing	Porsche 944 Turbo	Porsche 2.8 L Turbo I4	D	26	(United States) Mathew Jennings	3
(United States) Jacobs Motorsport	Porsche 993 GT2 R	Porsche 3.6 L Turbo Flat-6	P	30	(Colombia) Roberto Nieto	1*
(Germany) Konrad Motorsport	Porsche 993 GT2 R	Porsche 3.6 L Turbo Flat-6	D	32	(Germany) Jürgen von Gartzen	1
(Germany) Konrad Motorsport	Porsche 993 GT2 R	Porsche 3.6 L Turbo Flat-6	D	32	(United States) Charles Slater	1
(Germany) Konrad Motorsport	Porsche 993 GT2 R	Porsche 3.6 L Turbo Flat-6	D	32	(United States) Peter Kitchak	1
(Germany) Konrad Motorsport	Porsche 993 GT2 R	Porsche 3.6 L Turbo Flat-6	D	32	(United Kingdom) Calum Lockie	1
(Germany) Konrad Motorsport	Porsche 993 GT2 R	Porsche 3.6 L Turbo Flat-6	D	32	(Austria) Franz Konrad	1
(Germany) Proton Competition	Porsche 993 GT2	Porsche 3.6 L Turbo Flat-6	Y	38	(Germany) Gerold Ried	1
(Germany) Proton Competition	Porsche 993 GT2	Porsche 3.6 L Turbo Flat-6	Y	38	(Austria) Horst Felbermayr, Sr.	1
(Germany) Proton Competition	Porsche 993 GT2	Porsche 3.6 L Turbo Flat-6	Y	38	(Austria) Horst Felbermayr, Jr.	1
(Germany) Proton Competition	Porsche 993 GT2	Porsche 3.6 L Turbo Flat-6	Y	38	(Germany) Christian Ried	1
(United States) Team Viper West	Dodge Viper GTS-R	Dodge 8.0 L V10	D	45	(South Africa) Stephen Watson	1
(United States) Team Viper West	Dodge Viper GTS-R	Dodge 8.0 L V10	D	45	(United Kingdom) Christian Vann	1
(United States) Team Viper West	Dodge Viper GTS-R	Dodge 8.0 L V10	D	45	(Italy) Raffaele Sangiuolo	1
(United States) Team Viper West	Dodge Viper GTS-R	Dodge 8.0 L V10	D	45	(United States) Allison Duncan	1
(United States) Team Viper West	Dodge Viper GTS-R	Dodge 8.0 L V10	D	46	(United States) Erik Messley	1, 4–9
(United States) Team Viper West	Dodge Viper GTS-R	Dodge 8.0 L V10	D	46	(Switzerland) Toni Seiler	1
(United States) Team Viper West	Dodge Viper GTS-R	Dodge 8.0 L V10	D	46	(Switzerland) Walter Brun	1
(United States) Team Viper West	Dodge Viper GTS-R	Dodge 8.0 L V10	D	46	(United States) Stu Hayner	4–5, 7–9
(United States) Team Viper West	Dodge Viper GTS-R	Dodge 8.0 L V10	D	46	(United States) Marty Miller	6
(Switzerland) Haberthur Racing	Porsche 993 GT2 R	Porsche 3.6 L Turbo Flat-6	D	48	(Italy) Mauro Casadei	1
(Switzerland) Haberthur Racing	Porsche 993 GT2 R	Porsche 3.6 L Turbo Flat-6	D	48	(Italy) Stefano Bucci	1
(Switzerland) Haberthur Racing	Porsche 993 GT2 R	Porsche 3.6 L Turbo Flat-6	D	48	(Italy) Andrea Garbagnati	1
(Switzerland) Haberthur Racing	Porsche 993 GT2 R	Porsche 3.6 L Turbo Flat-6	D	48	(Italy) Renato Mastropietro	1
(Switzerland) Haberthur Racing	Porsche 993 GT2 R	Porsche 3.6 L Turbo Flat-6	D	49	(France) Patrick Vuillaume	1
(Switzerland) Haberthur Racing	Porsche 993 GT2 R	Porsche 3.6 L Turbo Flat-6	D	49	(United States) Ugo Colombo	1
(Switzerland) Haberthur Racing	Porsche 993 GT2 R	Porsche 3.6 L Turbo Flat-6	D	49	(Germany) Dieter Faller	1
(Switzerland) Haberthur Racing	Porsche 993 GT2 R	Porsche 3.6 L Turbo Flat-6	D	49	(Italy) Anssi Muenz	1
(United States) Motech Motorsports	Chevrolet Corvette C4	Chevrolet 5.8 L V8	G	48	(United States) Jim Moyer	5
(United States) Motech Motorsports	Chevrolet Corvette C4	Chevrolet 5.8 L V8	G	48	(United States) David Barnard	5
(United States) Autohaus Harrisburg Inc.	Porsche 968	Porsche 3.0 L I4	D	64	(United States) Todd Sprinkle	1
(United States) Autohaus Harrisburg Inc.	Porsche 968	Porsche 3.0 L I4	D	64	(United States) Harry Kintzi	1
(United States) Autohaus Harrisburg Inc.	Porsche 968	Porsche 3.0 L I4	D	64	(United States) Chad Block	1
(Germany) Freisinger Motorsport	Porsche 993 GT2 R	Porsche 3.8 L Turbo Flat-6	D	72	(Germany) Wolfgang Kaufmann	1
(Germany) Freisinger Motorsport	Porsche 993 GT2 R	Porsche 3.8 L Turbo Flat-6	D	72	(Germany) Ernst Palmberger	1
(Germany) Freisinger Motorsport	Porsche 993 GT2 R	Porsche 3.8 L Turbo Flat-6	D	72	(United States) Lance Stewart	1
(Germany) Freisinger Motorsport	Porsche 993 GT2 R	Porsche 3.8 L Turbo Flat-6	D	73	(Germany) Ulrich Gallade	1
(Germany) Freisinger Motorsport	Porsche 993 GT2 R	Porsche 3.8 L Turbo Flat-6	D	73	(Australia) Ray Lintott	1
(Germany) Freisinger Motorsport	Porsche 993 GT2 R	Porsche 3.8 L Turbo Flat-6	D	73	(Austria) Mandfred Jurasz	1
(Germany) Freisinger Motorsport	Porsche 993 GT2 R	Porsche 3.8 L Turbo Flat-6	D	73	(Germany) Klaus Horn	1
(United States) Free Spirit Motorsports	Porsche 993 GT2	Porsche 3.6 L Turbo Flat-6	P	79	(United States) David Kicak	1, 9
(United States) Free Spirit Motorsports	Porsche 993 GT2	Porsche 3.6 L Turbo Flat-6	P	79	(United States) Arthur Pilla	1, 9
(United States) Free Spirit Motorsports	Porsche 993 GT2	Porsche 3.6 L Turbo Flat-6	P	79	(United States) Scott Burkland	1
(United States) Michael McCann	Dodge Viper GTS-R	Dodge 8.0 L V10	G	82	(United States) Michael McCann	5, 7
(United States) Michael McCann	Dodge Viper GTS-R	Dodge 8.0 L V10	G	82	(United States) Tommy Archer	5
(United States) Michael McCann	Dodge Viper GTS-R	Dodge 8.0 L V10	G	82	(United States) Jim McCann	7
(United States) Michael McCann	Dodge Viper GTS-R	Dodge 8.0 L V10	G	82	(United States) Jeff Altenburg	7
(United Kingdom) Cirtek Motorsport	Porsche 993 GT2	Porsche 3.6 L Turbo Flat-6	D	83	(United Kingdom) David Warnock	1*
(United Kingdom) Cirtek Motorsport	Porsche 993 GT2	Porsche 3.6 L Turbo Flat-6	D	83	(United Kingdom) Robert Schirle	1*
(France) Viper Team Oreca	Dodge Viper GTS-R	Dodge 8.0 L V10	M	91	(Monaco) Olivier Beretta	1
(France) Viper Team Oreca	Dodge Viper GTS-R	Dodge 8.0 L V10	M	91	(Austria) Karl Wendlinger	1
(France) Viper Team Oreca	Dodge Viper GTS-R	Dodge 8.0 L V10	M	91	(France) Dominique Dupuy	1
(France) Viper Team Oreca	Dodge Viper GTS-R	Dodge 8.0 L V10	M	92	(United States) Tommy Archer	1
(France) Viper Team Oreca	Dodge Viper GTS-R	Dodge 8.0 L V10	M	92	(Belgium) Vincent Vosse	1
(France) Viper Team Oreca	Dodge Viper GTS-R	Dodge 8.0 L V10	M	92	(Belgium) Marc Duez	1
(France) Viper Team Oreca	Dodge Viper GTS-R	Dodge 8.0 L V10	M	92	(France) Jean-Philippe Belloc	1
(France) Viper Team Oreca	Dodge Viper GTS-R	Dodge 8.0 L V10	M	93	(United States) David Donohue	1
(France) Viper Team Oreca	Dodge Viper GTS-R	Dodge 8.0 L V10	M	93	(Portugal) Ni Amorim	1
(France) Viper Team Oreca	Dodge Viper GTS-R	Dodge 8.0 L V10	M	93	(France) Jean-Philippe Belloc	1
(France) Viper Team Oreca	Dodge Viper GTS-R	Dodge 8.0 L V10	M	93	(United States) Tommy Archer	1
(United States) Schumacher Racing	Porsche 993 GT2	Porsche 3.6 L Turbo Flat-6	?	99	(United States) Martin Snow	1
(United States) Schumacher Racing	Porsche 993 GT2	Porsche 3.6 L Turbo Flat-6	?	99	(United States) John O'Steen	1
(United States) Schumacher Racing	Porsche 993 GT2	Porsche 3.6 L Turbo Flat-6	?	99	(United States) Stu Hayner	1
(United States) Schumacher Racing	Porsche 993 GT2	Porsche 3.6 L Turbo Flat-6	?	99	(United States) Larry Schumacher	1

=== GTU ===
Team	Chassis	Engine	Tyre	No.	Drivers	Rnds.
(United States) Reiser Callas Rennsport	Porsche 996 GT3-R	Porsche 3.6 L Flat-6	Y	01	(United States) Grady Willingham	1
(United States) Reiser Callas Rennsport	Porsche 996 GT3-R	Porsche 3.6 L Flat-6	Y	01	(United States) Chris Pennington	1
(United States) Reiser Callas Rennsport	Porsche 996 GT3-R	Porsche 3.6 L Flat-6	Y	01	(United States) Joel Reiser	1
(United States) Reiser Callas Rennsport	Porsche 996 GT3-R	Porsche 3.6 L Flat-6	Y	01	(Italy) Simon Sobrero	1
(United States) Reiser Callas Rennsport	Porsche 996 GT3-R	Porsche 3.6 L Flat-6	Y	01	(United States) Craig Stanton	1
(United States) G & W Motorsports	Porsche 993 Carrera RSR	Porsche 3.6 L Flat-6	P	07	(United States) Steve Marshall	1–3
(United States) G & W Motorsports	Porsche 993 Carrera RSR	Porsche 3.6 L Flat-6	P	07	(United States) Danny Marshall	1, 3
(United States) G & W Motorsports	Porsche 993 Carrera RSR	Porsche 3.6 L Flat-6	P	07	(United States) Mike Fitzgerald	1
(United States) G & W Motorsports	Porsche 993 Carrera RSR	Porsche 3.6 L Flat-6	P	07	(United States) Greg Merril	1
(United States) G & W Motorsports	Porsche 993 Carrera RSR	Porsche 3.6 L Flat-6	P	07	(United States) Chris MacAllister	1
(United States) G & W Motorsports	Porsche 993 Carrera RSR	Porsche 3.6 L Flat-6	P	07	(United States) Darren Law	1
(United States) G & W Motorsports	Porsche 993 Carrera RSR	Porsche 3.6 L Flat-6	P	07	(United States) Chris Cook	2
(United States) G & W Motorsports	Porsche 996 GT3-R	Porsche 3.6 L Flat-6	D	80	(United States) John Morton	3–9
(United States) G & W Motorsports	Porsche 996 GT3-R	Porsche 3.6 L Flat-6	D	80	(United States) Michael Schrom	3–5, 7–9
(United States) G & W Motorsports	Porsche 996 GT3-R	Porsche 3.6 L Flat-6	D	80	(United States) Scooter Gabel	6–7
(United States) G & W Motorsports	Porsche 996 GT3-R	Porsche 3.6 L Flat-6	D	80	(United States) Price Cobb	9
(United States) G & W Motorsports	Porsche 996 GT3-R	Porsche 3.6 L Flat-6	M D	81	(United States) Darren Law	1–4, 6–9
(United States) G & W Motorsports	Porsche 996 GT3-R	Porsche 3.6 L Flat-6	M D	81	(Germany) Uwe Alzen	1
(United States) G & W Motorsports	Porsche 996 GT3-R	Porsche 3.6 L Flat-6	M D	81	(Netherlands) Duncan Huisman	1
(United States) G & W Motorsports	Porsche 996 GT3-R	Porsche 3.6 L Flat-6	M D	81	(Netherlands) Patrick Huisman	1
(United States) G & W Motorsports	Porsche 996 GT3-R	Porsche 3.6 L Flat-6	M D	81	(United States) Mike Fitzgerald	2–4, 6–9
(United States) MCR/Aspen Knolls	Porsche 996 GT3-R	Porsche 3.6 L Flat-6	P	2	(United States) Shane Lewis	1
(United States) MCR/Aspen Knolls	Porsche 996 GT3-R	Porsche 3.6 L Flat-6	P	2	(United States) Bob Mazzuoccola	1
(United States) MCR/Aspen Knolls	Porsche 996 GT3-R	Porsche 3.6 L Flat-6	P	2	(United States) Mike Bavaro	1
(United States) MCR/Aspen Knolls	Porsche 996 GT3-R	Porsche 3.6 L Flat-6	P	2	(United States) Cort Wagner	1
(Germany) RWS Motorsport	Porsche 996 GT3-R	Porsche 3.6 L Flat-6	M	7	(Austria) Philipp Peter	1
(Germany) RWS Motorsport	Porsche 996 GT3-R	Porsche 3.6 L Flat-6	M	7	(Belgium) Hans Willems	1
(Germany) RWS Motorsport	Porsche 996 GT3-R	Porsche 3.6 L Flat-6	M	7	(Austria) Hans-Jörg Hofer	1
(Germany) RWS Motorsport	Porsche 996 GT3-R	Porsche 3.6 L Flat-6	M	7	(Austria) Dieter Quester	1
(Germany) RWS Motorsport	Porsche 996 GT3-R	Porsche 3.6 L Flat-6	M	7	(Italy) Luca Riccitelli	1
(United States) Kelly Moss Racing	Porsche 996 GT3-R	Porsche 3.6 L Flat-6	Y	7	(United States) David Murry	9
(United States) Kelly Moss Racing	Porsche 996 GT3-R	Porsche 3.6 L Flat-6	Y	7	(Germany) Lucas Luhr	9
(United States) Kelly Moss Racing	Porsche 996 GT3-R	Porsche 3.6 L Flat-6	Y	7	(United States) Rick Polk	9
(Germany) Jurgen/Alzen Motorsport	Porsche 996 GT3-R	Porsche 3.6 L Flat-6	P	10	(Germany) Ulli Richter	1
(Germany) Jurgen/Alzen Motorsport	Porsche 996 GT3-R	Porsche 3.6 L Flat-6	P	10	(Germany) Wilhelm Kern	1
(Germany) Jurgen/Alzen Motorsport	Porsche 996 GT3-R	Porsche 3.6 L Flat-6	P	10	(Germany) Axel Rohr	1
(Germany) Jurgen/Alzen Motorsport	Porsche 996 GT3-R	Porsche 3.6 L Flat-6	P	10	(Germany) Jürgen Alzen	1
(United States) Genesis Racing	BMW M3 (E36)	BMW 3.2 L I6	Y	10	(United States) Chris Gleason	5
(United States) Genesis Racing	BMW M3 (E36)	BMW 3.2 L I6	Y	10	(United States) Marc Bunting	5
(United States) Genesis Racing	BMW M3 (E36)	BMW 3.2 L I6	Y	50	(United States) Rick Fairbanks	All
(United States) Genesis Racing	BMW M3 (E36)	BMW 3.2 L I6	Y	50	(United States) Bill Auberlen	1–2, 4–6, 9
(United States) Genesis Racing	BMW M3 (E36)	BMW 3.2 L I6	Y	50	(United States) Nick Ham	1
(United States) Genesis Racing	BMW M3 (E36)	BMW 3.2 L I6	Y	50	(United States) Chris Gleason	1
(United States) Genesis Racing	BMW M3 (E36)	BMW 3.2 L I6	Y	50	(United States) Chuck Goldsborough	3
(United States) Genesis Racing	BMW M3 (E36)	BMW 3.2 L I6	Y	50	(United States) Andy Pilgrim	7–8
(United States) Genesis Racing	BMW M3 (E36)	BMW 3.2 L I6	Y	54	(United States) Toney Jennings	7, 9
(United States) Genesis Racing	BMW M3 (E36)	BMW 3.2 L I6	Y	54	(United States) Charles Espenlaub	7
(United States) Genesis Racing	BMW M3 (E36)	BMW 3.2 L I6	Y	54	(United States) Kelly Collins	9
(United States) Genesis Racing	BMW M3 (E36)	BMW 3.2 L I6	Y	55	(United States) Felipe Rezk	1
(United States) Genesis Racing	BMW M3 (E36)	BMW 3.2 L I6	Y	55	(United States) Shareef Malnik	1
(United States) Genesis Racing	BMW M3 (E36)	BMW 3.2 L I6	Y	55	(United States) Dennis Crowley	1
(United States) Genesis Racing	BMW M3 (E36)	BMW 3.2 L I6	Y	55	(United States) Chris Miller	1
(United States) Genesis Racing	BMW M3 (E36)	BMW 3.2 L I6	Y	55	(United States) Andy Pilgrim	2, 5–6
(United States) Genesis Racing	BMW M3 (E36)	BMW 3.2 L I6	Y	55	(United States) Scott Neuman	2
(United States) Genesis Racing	BMW M3 (E36)	BMW 3.2 L I6	Y	55	(United States) Chris Gleason	3
(United States) Genesis Racing	BMW M3 (E36)	BMW 3.2 L I6	Y	55	(United States) Marc Bunting	3
(United States) Genesis Racing	BMW M3 (E36)	BMW 3.2 L I6	Y	55	(United States) Chuck Goldsborough	4–5
(United States) Genesis Racing	BMW M3 (E36)	BMW 3.2 L I6	Y	55	(Germany) Michael Lauer	4
(United States) Genesis Racing	BMW M3 (E36)	BMW 3.2 L I6	Y	55	(United States) Emil Assentato	7
(United States) Genesis Racing	BMW M3 (E36)	BMW 3.2 L I6	Y	55	(United States) Jeff Altenburg	8
(United States) Genesis Racing	BMW M3 (E36)	BMW 3.2 L I6	Y	55	(United States) Adam Burrows	9
(United States) Fordahl Motorsports (United States) Crazy Redhead Racing	Porsche 964 Carrera RSR	Porsche 3.8 L Flat-6	Y	18	(United States) Steve Valentinetti	2, 5, 9
(United States) Fordahl Motorsports (United States) Crazy Redhead Racing	Porsche 964 Carrera RSR	Porsche 3.8 L Flat-6	Y	18	(United States) Kimberly Hiskey	2
(United States) Fordahl Motorsports (United States) Crazy Redhead Racing	Porsche 964 Carrera RSR	Porsche 3.8 L Flat-6	Y	18	(United States) Randy Pobst	5, 9
(United States) Aasco Performance	Porsche 993 Carrera RSR	Porsche 3.8 L Flat-6	Y	21	(United States) Andy Hajducky	1, 4, 7, 9
(United States) Aasco Performance	Porsche 993 Carrera RSR	Porsche 3.8 L Flat-6	Y	21	(United States) Bobby Oneglia	1, 4, 7, 9
(United States) Aasco Performance	Porsche 993 Carrera RSR	Porsche 3.8 L Flat-6	Y	21	(United States) Dave Geremia	1, 7
(United States) Aasco Performance	Porsche 993 Carrera RSR	Porsche 3.8 L Flat-6	Y	21	(United States) John Rutherford	1
(United States) Aasco Performance	Porsche 993 Carrera RSR	Porsche 3.8 L Flat-6	Y	21	(United States) Ken Fengler	1
(United States) Aasco Performance	Porsche 993 Carrera RSR	Porsche 3.8 L Flat-6	Y	21	(United States) Bobby Carradine	1
(United States) Aasco Performance	Porsche 993 Carrera RSR	Porsche 3.8 L Flat-6	Y	21	(United States) Dennis Aase	9
(Germany) SMS Seikel Motor Sport	Porsche 996 GT3-R	Porsche 3.6 L Flat-6	D	22	(United States) Kurt Matthewson	1
(Germany) SMS Seikel Motor Sport	Porsche 996 GT3-R	Porsche 3.6 L Flat-6	D	22	(Canada) Tony Burgess	1
(Germany) SMS Seikel Motor Sport	Porsche 996 GT3-R	Porsche 3.6 L Flat-6	D	22	(Italy) Paolo Rapetti	1
(Germany) SMS Seikel Motor Sport	Porsche 996 GT3-R	Porsche 3.6 L Flat-6	D	22	(Belgium) Michel Neugarten	1
(Germany) SMS Seikel Motor Sport	Porsche 996 GT3-R	Porsche 3.6 L Flat-6	D	22	(Canada) Scott Goodyear	1*
(United States) Alex Job Racing	Porsche 996 GT3-R	Porsche 3.6 L Flat-6	M	23	(United States) Randy Pobst	1
(United States) Alex Job Racing	Porsche 996 GT3-R	Porsche 3.6 L Flat-6	M	23	(Belgium) Bruno Lambert	1
(United States) Alex Job Racing	Porsche 996 GT3-R	Porsche 3.6 L Flat-6	M	23	(United States) Mike Conte	1
(United States) Goldin Brothers Racing	Mazda RX-7	Mazda 13B 2.0 L 3-Rotor	H G	24	(United States) Scott Finlay	1
(United States) Goldin Brothers Racing	Mazda RX-7	Mazda 13B 2.0 L 3-Rotor	H G	24	(United States) Steve Goldin	1
(United States) Goldin Brothers Racing	Mazda RX-7	Mazda 13B 2.0 L 3-Rotor	H G	24	(United States) Keith Goldin	1
(Japan) Yellow Magic	Ferrari F355	Ferrari F129B 3.5 L V8	Y	28	(Japan) Toshio Suzuki	1
(Japan) Yellow Magic	Ferrari F355	Ferrari F129B 3.5 L V8	Y	28	(Sweden) Anders Olofsson	1
(Japan) Yellow Magic	Ferrari F355	Ferrari F129B 3.5 L V8	Y	28	(Japan) Tsuyoshi Takahashi	1
(Japan) Yellow Magic	Ferrari F355	Ferrari F129B 3.5 L V8	Y	28	(Canada) Van Peter Hanson	1
(United States) White Lightning Racing	Porsche 996 GT3-R	Porsche 3.6 L Flat-6	M	30	(United States) Michael Petersen	2*
(United States) White Lightning Racing	Porsche 996 GT3-R	Porsche 3.6 L Flat-6	M	30	(United States) Dale White	2*
(Italy) MAC Racing	Porsche 996 GT3-R	Porsche 3.6 L Flat-6	P	33	(Belgium) Marc Schoonbroodt	1
(Italy) MAC Racing	Porsche 996 GT3-R	Porsche 3.6 L Flat-6	P	33	(Italy) Luciano Tamburini	1
(Italy) MAC Racing	Porsche 996 GT3-R	Porsche 3.6 L Flat-6	P	33	(Italy) Franco Buganè	1
(Italy) MAC Racing	Porsche 996 GT3-R	Porsche 3.6 L Flat-6	P	33	(Denmark) Kurt Thiel	1
(Italy) MAC Racing	Porsche 996 GT3-R	Porsche 3.6 L Flat-6	P	33	(Italy) Roberto Bonuomo	1
(Italy) MAC Racing	Porsche 996 GT3-R	Porsche 3.6 L Flat-6	P	58	(Italy) Massimo Morini	1
(Italy) MAC Racing	Porsche 996 GT3-R	Porsche 3.6 L Flat-6	P	58	(Italy) Antonio De Castro	1
(Italy) MAC Racing	Porsche 996 GT3-R	Porsche 3.6 L Flat-6	P	58	(Italy) Luca Cattaneo	1
(Italy) MAC Racing	Porsche 996 GT3-R	Porsche 3.6 L Flat-6	P	58	(Italy) Renato Bicciato	1
(Italy) MAC Racing	Porsche 996 GT3-R	Porsche 3.6 L Flat-6	P	58	(Italy) Massimo Frigerio	1
(United States) Autohaus Harrisburg Inc. (United States) Pumpelly Racing	Porsche 993 Carrera RSR	Porsche 3.8 L Flat-6 (1, 4) Porsche 3.6 L Flat-6 (5, 9)	G	34	(United States) Spencer Pumpelly	1, 4–5, 9
(United States) Autohaus Harrisburg Inc. (United States) Pumpelly Racing	Porsche 993 Carrera RSR	Porsche 3.8 L Flat-6 (1, 4) Porsche 3.6 L Flat-6 (5, 9)	G	34	(United States) Emil Assentato	1, 4–5, 9
(United States) Autohaus Harrisburg Inc. (United States) Pumpelly Racing	Porsche 993 Carrera RSR	Porsche 3.8 L Flat-6 (1, 4) Porsche 3.6 L Flat-6 (5, 9)	G	34	(United States) John Steinmetz	1
(United States) Autohaus Harrisburg Inc. (United States) Pumpelly Racing	Porsche 993 Carrera RSR	Porsche 3.8 L Flat-6 (1, 4) Porsche 3.6 L Flat-6 (5, 9)	G	34	(United Kingdom) Gregor Fisken	1
(Italy) Franco Scapini Motorsport	Ferrari F355	Ferrari F129B 3.5 L V8	P	35	(Italy) Pierangelo Masselli	1
(Italy) Franco Scapini Motorsport	Ferrari F355	Ferrari F129B 3.5 L V8	P	35	(Italy) Franco Scapini	1
(Italy) Franco Scapini Motorsport	Ferrari F355	Ferrari F129B 3.5 L V8	P	35	(Italy) Ivan Capelli	1
(Italy) Franco Scapini Motorsport	Ferrari F355	Ferrari F129B 3.5 L V8	P	35	(Italy) Erich Prinoth	1
(United States) Swedish Racing	Mazda RX-7	Mazda 2.0 L 3-Rotor	G	38	(United States) Tony Ave	5, 7
(United States) Swedish Racing	Mazda RX-7	Mazda 2.0 L 3-Rotor	G	38	(United States) Lester Fahlgren	5, 7
(United States) Swedish Racing	Mazda RX-7	Mazda 2.0 L 3-Rotor	G	38	(United States) Jay Shuler	7
(Switzerland) L. R. Organisation	Porsche 996 GT3-R	Porsche 3.6 L Flat-6	D	41	(United Kingdom) Peter Hardman	1
(Switzerland) L. R. Organisation	Porsche 996 GT3-R	Porsche 3.6 L Flat-6	D	41	(Switzerland) Philippe Favre	1
(Switzerland) L. R. Organisation	Porsche 996 GT3-R	Porsche 3.6 L Flat-6	D	41	(Belgium) Stanislas De Sadeleer	1
(Switzerland) L. R. Organisation	Porsche 996 GT3-R	Porsche 3.6 L Flat-6	D	41	(Germany) Nicolaus Springer	1
(United States) Orbit	Porsche 996 GT3-R	Porsche 3.6 L Flat-6	D	43	(United States) Peter Baron	9
(United States) Orbit	Porsche 996 GT3-R	Porsche 3.6 L Flat-6	D	43	(United States) Matt Drendel	9
(United States) Orbit	Porsche 996 GT3-R	Porsche 3.6 L Flat-6	D	43	(United States) Gian Luigi Buitoni	9
(United Kingdom) PK Sport	Porsche 996 GT3-R	Porsche 3.6 L Flat-6	D	44	(United Kingdom) Peter Chambers	1
(United Kingdom) PK Sport	Porsche 996 GT3-R	Porsche 3.6 L Flat-6	D	44	(United Kingdom) Paul Fuller	1
(United Kingdom) PK Sport	Porsche 996 GT3-R	Porsche 3.6 L Flat-6	D	44	(United Kingdom) Mike Youles	1
(United Kingdom) PK Sport	Porsche 996 GT3-R	Porsche 3.6 L Flat-6	D	44	(United Kingdom) Marcus Fothergill	1
(United Kingdom) PK Sport	Porsche 996 GT3-R	Porsche 3.6 L Flat-6	D	44	(United Kingdom) Adam Simmons	1
(Puerto Rico) Aponte Bros Racing	Mazda RX-7	Mazda 2.0 L 3-Rotor	G	44	(Puerto Rico) Pascasio Aponte	6–9
(Puerto Rico) Aponte Bros Racing	Mazda RX-7	Mazda 2.0 L 3-Rotor	G	44	(Puerto Rico) Angel Blanc	6–9
(Puerto Rico) Aponte Bros Racing	Mazda RX-7	Mazda 2.0 L 3-Rotor	G	44	(Puerto Rico) Juan Giol	6–7
(United States) Jack Lewis Enterprises	Porsche 964 Carrera RSR	Porsche 3.8 L Flat-6	G	49	(United States) Jack Lewis	4, 7, 9
(United States) Jack Lewis Enterprises	Porsche 964 Carrera RSR	Porsche 3.8 L Flat-6	G	49	(United States) Karl McKeever	4, 7, 9
(United States) Dick Barbour Racing	Porsche 996 GT3-R	Porsche 3.6 L Flat-6	M	51	(Germany) Lucas Luhr	1
(United States) Dick Barbour Racing	Porsche 996 GT3-R	Porsche 3.6 L Flat-6	M	51	(Germany) Dirk Müller	1
(United States) Dick Barbour Racing	Porsche 996 GT3-R	Porsche 3.6 L Flat-6	M	51	(France) Bob Wollek	1
(United States) Safina Racing	BMW M3 (E36)	BMW 3.2 L I6	P Y	52 62	(United States) Joseph Safina	1, 3
(United States) Safina Racing	BMW M3 (E36)	BMW 3.2 L I6	P Y	52 62	(United States) Hugh Plumb	1
(United States) Safina Racing	BMW M3 (E36)	BMW 3.2 L I6	P Y	52 62	(United States) Mark Hillstead	1
(United States) Safina Racing	BMW M3 (E36)	BMW 3.2 L I6	P Y	52 62	(United States) Carlos de Quesada	1
(United States) Safina Racing	BMW M3 (E36)	BMW 3.2 L I6	P Y	52 62	(United States) Ross Bluestein	1
(United States) Safina Racing	BMW M3 (E36)	BMW 3.2 L I6	P Y	52 62	(United States) Scooter Gabel	3
(United States) Bell Motorsports	BMW M3 (E36)	BMW 3.2 L I6	Y	54	(United States) Matt Drendel	1
(United States) Bell Motorsports	BMW M3 (E36)	BMW 3.2 L I6	Y	54	(Germany) Hans-Joachim Stuck	1
(United States) Bell Motorsports	BMW M3 (E36)	BMW 3.2 L I6	Y	54	(United States) Scott Neuman	1
(United States) Bell Motorsports	BMW M3 (E36)	BMW 3.2 L I6	Y	54	(United States) Ron Johnson	1
(United States) Bell Motorsports	BMW M3 (E36)	BMW 3.2 L I6	Y	54	(United States) Peter Cunningham	1
(Switzerland) Haberthur Racing	Porsche 996 GT3-R	Porsche 3.6 L Flat-6	P	56	(Italy) Luca Drudi	1
(Switzerland) Haberthur Racing	Porsche 996 GT3-R	Porsche 3.6 L Flat-6	P	56	(Italy) Fabio Babini	1
(Switzerland) Haberthur Racing	Porsche 996 GT3-R	Porsche 3.6 L Flat-6	P	56	(Italy) Fabio Rosa	1
(Switzerland) Haberthur Racing	Porsche 996 GT3-R	Porsche 3.6 L Flat-6	P	56	(Italy) Gabrio Rosa	1
(Switzerland) Haberthur Racing	Porsche 996 GT3-R	Porsche 3.6 L Flat-6	D	57	(France) Jean-Luc Maury-Laribiére	1
(Switzerland) Haberthur Racing	Porsche 996 GT3-R	Porsche 3.6 L Flat-6	D	57	(France) Pascal Fabre	1
(Switzerland) Haberthur Racing	Porsche 996 GT3-R	Porsche 3.6 L Flat-6	D	57	(France) Bernard Chauvin	1
(Switzerland) Haberthur Racing	Porsche 996 GT3-R	Porsche 3.6 L Flat-6	D	57	(France) Patrick Cruchet	1
(Switzerland) Haberthur Racing	Porsche 996 GT3-R	Porsche 3.6 L Flat-6	D	57	(Canada) Raël	1
(United States) ProTechnik Racing	Porsche 993 (Fabcar)	Porsche 3.8 L Flat-6	G	58	(United States) Sam Shalala	2, 5, 7, 9
(United States) ProTechnik Racing	Porsche 993 (Fabcar)	Porsche 3.8 L Flat-6	G	58	(United States) Lew Bouchier	2, 5, 7, 9
(United States) ProTechnik Racing	Porsche 993 (Fabcar)	Porsche 3.8 L Flat-6	G	58	(United States) Scott Knollenberg	5, 7, 9
(United States) ProTechnik Racing	Porsche 996 GT3-R	Porsche 3.6 L Flat-6	P	93	(United States) Tom McGlynn	5, 7
(United States) ProTechnik Racing	Porsche 996 GT3-R	Porsche 3.6 L Flat-6	P	93	(United States) Jan Rask	5, 7
(United States) Brumos Porsche	Porsche 996 GT3-R	Porsche 3.6 L Flat-6	M	59	(Germany) Jürgen Barth	1
(United States) Brumos Porsche	Porsche 996 GT3-R	Porsche 3.6 L Flat-6	M	59	(France) Roland Bervillé	1
(United States) Brumos Porsche	Porsche 996 GT3-R	Porsche 3.6 L Flat-6	M	59	(France) Michel Ligonnet	1
(United States) Brumos Porsche	Porsche 996 GT3-R	Porsche 3.6 L Flat-6	M	59	(France) Ferdinand de Lesseps	1
(United States) Paragon Motorsports	Porsche 964 Carrera Cup	Porsche 3.4 L Flat-6	P	61	(United States) Keith Fisher	3–5, 9
(United States) Paragon Motorsports	Porsche 964 Carrera Cup	Porsche 3.4 L Flat-6	P	61	(United States) Scott Brunk	3–5, 9
(United States) The Racer's Group	Porsche 996 GT3-R	Porsche 3.6 L Flat-6	P	66	(United States) Don Kitch	1
(United States) The Racer's Group	Porsche 996 GT3-R	Porsche 3.6 L Flat-6	P	66	(United States) Steve Miller	1
(United States) The Racer's Group	Porsche 996 GT3-R	Porsche 3.6 L Flat-6	P	66	(Japan) Kiichi Takahashi	1
(United States) The Racer's Group	Porsche 996 GT3-R	Porsche 3.6 L Flat-6	P	66	(United States) Dave Gaylord	1
(United States) The Racer's Group	Porsche 996 GT3-R	Porsche 3.6 L Flat-6	P	66	(United States) Kevin Buckler	2–9
(United States) The Racer's Group	Porsche 996 GT3-R	Porsche 3.6 L Flat-6	P	66	(United States) Philip Collin	2–9
(United States) The Racer's Group	Porsche 996 GT3-R (1, 5-6, 9) Porsche 993 Carrera RSR (7-8)	Porsche 3.6 L Flat-6	P	67	(United States) Philip Collin	1
(United States) The Racer's Group	Porsche 996 GT3-R (1, 5-6, 9) Porsche 993 Carrera RSR (7-8)	Porsche 3.6 L Flat-6	P	67	(United States) Wade Gaughran	1
(United States) The Racer's Group	Porsche 996 GT3-R (1, 5-6, 9) Porsche 993 Carrera RSR (7-8)	Porsche 3.6 L Flat-6	P	67	(United States) Dale White	1
(United States) The Racer's Group	Porsche 996 GT3-R (1, 5-6, 9) Porsche 993 Carrera RSR (7-8)	Porsche 3.6 L Flat-6	P	67	(United States) Kevin Buckler	1
(United States) The Racer's Group	Porsche 996 GT3-R (1, 5-6, 9) Porsche 993 Carrera RSR (7-8)	Porsche 3.6 L Flat-6	P	67	(United States) Michael Petersen	1
(United States) The Racer's Group	Porsche 996 GT3-R (1, 5-6, 9) Porsche 993 Carrera RSR (7-8)	Porsche 3.6 L Flat-6	P	67	(United States) Jennifer Tumminelli	5, 7
(United States) The Racer's Group	Porsche 996 GT3-R (1, 5-6, 9) Porsche 993 Carrera RSR (7-8)	Porsche 3.6 L Flat-6	P	67	(United States) Robert Nagel	5
(United States) The Racer's Group	Porsche 996 GT3-R (1, 5-6, 9) Porsche 993 Carrera RSR (7-8)	Porsche 3.6 L Flat-6	P	67	(United States) Brad Wurtz	6, 9
(United States) The Racer's Group	Porsche 996 GT3-R (1, 5-6, 9) Porsche 993 Carrera RSR (7-8)	Porsche 3.6 L Flat-6	P	67	(United States) Robert Orcutt	6
(United States) The Racer's Group	Porsche 996 GT3-R (1, 5-6, 9) Porsche 993 Carrera RSR (7-8)	Porsche 3.6 L Flat-6	P	67	(Italy) Ludovico Manfredi	7, 9
(United States) The Racer's Group	Porsche 996 GT3-R (1, 5-6, 9) Porsche 993 Carrera RSR (7-8)	Porsche 3.6 L Flat-6	P	67	(United States) Steve Ariana	7
(United States) The Racer's Group	Porsche 996 GT3-R (1, 5-6, 9) Porsche 993 Carrera RSR (7-8)	Porsche 3.6 L Flat-6	P	67	(Canada) Stephane Roy	8
(United States) The Racer's Group	Porsche 996 GT3-R (1, 5-6, 9) Porsche 993 Carrera RSR (7-8)	Porsche 3.6 L Flat-6	P	67	(Canada) Jean-Francois Dumoulin	8
(United States) The Racer's Group	Porsche 996 GT3-R (1, 5-6, 9) Porsche 993 Carrera RSR (7-8)	Porsche 3.6 L Flat-6	P	67	(United States) George Biskup	9
(United States) The Racer's Group	Porsche 993 Carrera RSR	Porsche 3.6 L Flat-6	P	68	(United States) Ron Herrerias	1
(United States) The Racer's Group	Porsche 993 Carrera RSR	Porsche 3.6 L Flat-6	P	68	(United States) Mike Smith	1
(United States) The Racer's Group	Porsche 993 Carrera RSR	Porsche 3.6 L Flat-6	P	68	(United States) Tom McGlynn	1
(United States) The Racer's Group	Porsche 993 Carrera RSR	Porsche 3.6 L Flat-6	P	68	(Italy) Ludovico Manfredi	1
(United Kingdom) EMKA Racing	Porsche 996 GT3-R	Porsche 3.6 L Flat-6	P	69	(United Kingdom) Derek Bell	1
(United Kingdom) EMKA Racing	Porsche 996 GT3-R	Porsche 3.6 L Flat-6	P	69	(United Kingdom) Tim Sugden	1
(United Kingdom) EMKA Racing	Porsche 996 GT3-R	Porsche 3.6 L Flat-6	P	69	(United Kingdom) Stephen Day	1
(United Kingdom) EMKA Racing	Porsche 996 GT3-R	Porsche 3.6 L Flat-6	P	69	(United Kingdom) Steve O'Rourke	1
(Australia) Skea Racing International	Porsche 996 GT3-R	Porsche 3.6 L Flat-6	P	70	(United States) David Murry	1
(Australia) Skea Racing International	Porsche 996 GT3-R	Porsche 3.6 L Flat-6	P	70	(United States) Lloyd Hawkins	1
(Australia) Skea Racing International	Porsche 996 GT3-R	Porsche 3.6 L Flat-6	P	70	(Australia) Rohan Skea	1
(Australia) Skea Racing International	Porsche 996 GT3-R	Porsche 3.6 L Flat-6	P	70	(United Kingdom) Johnny Mowlem	1
(United States) Auto Sport South Racing	Porsche 993 Carrera RSR	Porsche 3.8 L Flat-6	D	73	(United States) Allan Ziegelman	3, 9
(United States) Auto Sport South Racing	Porsche 993 Carrera RSR	Porsche 3.8 L Flat-6	D	73	(United States) Lance Stewart	3, 9
(United States) Auto Sport South Racing	Porsche 993 Carrera RSR	Porsche 3.8 L Flat-6	D	73	(United States) Joe Foster	3
(United States) Auto Sport South Racing	Porsche 993 Carrera RSR	Porsche 3.8 L Flat-6	D	73	(United States) Peter Argetsinger	9
(United States) Pettit Racing	Mazda RX-7	Mazda 2.0 L 3-Rotor	H	73	(United States) Cameron Worth	5
(United States) Pettit Racing	Mazda RX-7	Mazda 2.0 L 3-Rotor	H	73	(United States) David Schardt	5
(United States) Champion Racing	Porsche 996 GT3-R	Porsche 3.6 L Flat-6	M	75	(United States) Mike Brockman	1
(United States) Champion Racing	Porsche 996 GT3-R	Porsche 3.6 L Flat-6	M	75	(United States) Paul Newman	1
(United States) Champion Racing	Porsche 996 GT3-R	Porsche 3.6 L Flat-6	M	75	(Germany) Michael Lauer	1
(United States) Champion Racing	Porsche 996 GT3-R	Porsche 3.6 L Flat-6	M	75	(United States) Gunnar Jeannette	1
(Canada) RPM Competition	Porsche 993 Carrera RSR	Porsche 3.6 L Flat-6	G	77	(Canada) Fernand LeBlanc	8
(Canada) RPM Competition	Porsche 993 Carrera RSR	Porsche 3.6 L Flat-6	G	77	(Canada) Renald Hamelin	8
(United States) MCR/Nygmatech	Porsche 996 GT3-R	Porsche 3.6 L Flat-6	P	88	(United States) Peter Baron	1
(United States) MCR/Nygmatech	Porsche 996 GT3-R	Porsche 3.6 L Flat-6	P	88	(United States) Gian Luigi Buitoni	1
(United States) MCR/Nygmatech	Porsche 996 GT3-R	Porsche 3.6 L Flat-6	P	88	(United States) Tony Kester	1
(United States) MCR/Nygmatech	Porsche 996 GT3-R	Porsche 3.6 L Flat-6	P	88	(United States) Leo Hindery	1
(United States) MCR/Nygmatech	Porsche 996 GT3-R	Porsche 3.6 L Flat-6	P	88	(United States) Mike Borkowski	1
(United States) MCR/Nygmatech	Porsche 996 GT3-R	Porsche 3.6 L Flat-6	P	89	(United States) James McCormick	1
(United States) MCR/Nygmatech	Porsche 996 GT3-R	Porsche 3.6 L Flat-6	P	89	(United States) Kevin Crowder	1
(United States) MCR/Nygmatech	Porsche 996 GT3-R	Porsche 3.6 L Flat-6	P	89	(United States) Tim Robertson	1
(United States) MCR/Nygmatech	Porsche 996 GT3-R	Porsche 3.6 L Flat-6	P	89	(United States) Kurt Baumann	1
(Canada) Porsche Haus Racing	Porsche 996 GT3 Cup	Porsche 3.6 L Flat-6	P	88	(Canada) Robert Julien	8–9
(Canada) Porsche Haus Racing	Porsche 996 GT3 Cup	Porsche 3.6 L Flat-6	P	88	(Canada) Stephane Veilleux	8
(Canada) Porsche Haus Racing	Porsche 996 GT3 Cup	Porsche 3.6 L Flat-6	P	88	(Canada) Jean-Francois Dumoulin	9
(Canada) Porsche Haus Racing	Porsche 993 Carrera RSR	Porsche 3.8 L Flat-6	P	89	(Canada) Stephane Veilleux	9
(Canada) Porsche Haus Racing	Porsche 993 Carrera RSR	Porsche 3.8 L Flat-6	P	89	(Canada) Denis Tancrede	9
(France) Larbre Compétition	Porsche 996 GT3-R	Porsche 3.6 L Flat-6	M	90	(France) Christophe Bouchut	1
(France) Larbre Compétition	Porsche 996 GT3-R	Porsche 3.6 L Flat-6	M	90	(Germany) André Ahrlé	1
(France) Larbre Compétition	Porsche 996 GT3-R	Porsche 3.6 L Flat-6	M	90	(France) Jean-Luc Chéreau	1
(France) Larbre Compétition	Porsche 996 GT3-R	Porsche 3.6 L Flat-6	M	90	(France) Patrice Goueslard	1
(United States) Millennium Motorsports	Porsche 993 Carrera RSR	Porsche 3.8 L Flat-6	Y	90	(United States) David Friedman	4, 6, 9
(United States) Millennium Motorsports	Porsche 993 Carrera RSR	Porsche 3.8 L Flat-6	Y	90	(United States) Chris Miller	4, 6
(United States) Millennium Motorsports	Porsche 993 Carrera RSR	Porsche 3.8 L Flat-6	Y	90	(United States) Beran Peter	9
(United States) Nucap	Porsche 996 GT3 Cup	Porsche 3.6 L Flat-6	D	96	(United States) Joe Foster	1*
(United States) Schmidt Brothers	Porsche 993 Carrera RSR	Porsche 3.8 L Flat-6	P	97	(United States) Max Schmidt	1
(United States) Schmidt Brothers	Porsche 993 Carrera RSR	Porsche 3.8 L Flat-6	P	97	(United States) Jeff Conkel	1
(United States) Schmidt Brothers	Porsche 993 Carrera RSR	Porsche 3.8 L Flat-6	P	97	(United States) Bob Woodman	1
(United States) Schmidt Brothers	Porsche 993 Carrera RSR	Porsche 3.8 L Flat-6	P	97	(United States) Rusty Schmidt	1
(United States) Gunnar Racing	Porsche 993 Carrera RSR	Porsche 3.8 L Flat-6	D	97	(United States) Joe Policastro, Sr.	6, 9
(United States) Gunnar Racing	Porsche 993 Carrera RSR	Porsche 3.8 L Flat-6	D	97	(United States) Joe Policastro, Jr.	6, 9
(United States) Gunnar Racing	Porsche 993 Carrera RSR	Porsche 3.8 L Flat-6	D	97	(United States) Wayne Jackson	6, 9
(United States) Finstine Racing	Porsche 996 GT3 Cup	Porsche 3.6 L Flat-6	P	98	(United States) Catesby Jones	1*
(United States) Grand Touring Technologies	Porsche 996 GT3 Cup	Porsche 3.6 L Flat-6	Y	98	(United States) Randy Pobst	3, 6
(United States) Grand Touring Technologies	Porsche 996 GT3 Cup	Porsche 3.6 L Flat-6	Y	98	(United States) Kevin Wheeler	3
(United States) Grand Touring Technologies	Porsche 996 GT3 Cup	Porsche 3.6 L Flat-6	Y	98	(United States) Kimberly Hiskey	6
(United States) Grand Touring Technologies	Porsche 996 GT3 Cup	Porsche 3.6 L Flat-6	Y	98	(United States) Ron Zitza	9
(United States) Grand Touring Technologies	Porsche 996 GT3 Cup	Porsche 3.6 L Flat-6	Y	98	(United States) Ian Lacey	9
(United States) Grand Touring Technologies	Porsche 996 GT3 Cup	Porsche 3.6 L Flat-6	Y	98	(United States) Roy Hopkins	9

=== AGT ===
Team	Chassis	Engine	Tyre	No.	Drivers	Rnds.
(United States) Orion Motorsports - Team Chicago	Ford Mustang (Roush)	Ford 5.9 L V8	G	00	(United States) Paul Jenkins	2–7, 9
(United States) Orion Motorsports - Team Chicago	Ford Mustang (Roush)	Ford 5.9 L V8	G	00	(United States) Bruce Nesbitt	2–3, 5–7, 9
(United States) Orion Motorsports - Team Chicago	Ford Mustang (Roush)	Ford 5.9 L V8	G	00	(United States) Eric Curran	4, 9
(United States) Orion Motorsports - Team Chicago	Ford Mustang (Roush)	Ford 5.9 L V8	G	00	(United States) Steve Pelke	7
(United States) Last Lap Restorations	Chevrolet Monte Carlo (Laughlin)	Chevrolet 5.9 L V8	G	04	(United States) John Davis	6
(United States) Last Lap Restorations	Chevrolet Monte Carlo (Laughlin)	Chevrolet 5.9 L V8	G	04	(United States) Bob Hill	6
(United States) The Spirit of Daytona	Chevrolet Camaro (Riggins)	Chevrolet 5.9 L V8	P	09	(United States) Craig Conway	All
(United States) The Spirit of Daytona	Chevrolet Camaro (Riggins)	Chevrolet 5.9 L V8	P	09	(United States) Doug Goad	All
(United States) The Spirit of Daytona	Chevrolet Camaro (Riggins)	Chevrolet 5.9 L V8	P	09	(United States) Troy Flis	1, 9
(United States) The Spirit of Daytona	Chevrolet Camaro (Riggins)	Chevrolet 5.9 L V8	P	09	(United States) Todd Flis	1
(United States) Jack Lewis Enterprises	Ford Thunderbird (Laughlin)	Ford 5.8 L V8	G	7	(United States) John Finger	6
(United States) Jack Lewis Enterprises	Ford Thunderbird (Laughlin)	Ford 5.8 L V8	G	7	(United States) Jack Lewis	6
(United States) Leavy - Hamilton Safe	Chevrolet Camaro (Riley & Scott)	Chevrolet 5.9 L V8	BF	11	(United States) Ken Bupp	6, 9
(United States) Leavy - Hamilton Safe	Chevrolet Camaro (Riley & Scott)	Chevrolet 5.9 L V8	BF	11	(United States) Gary Pile	6
(United States) Leavy - Hamilton Safe	Chevrolet Camaro (Riley & Scott)	Chevrolet 5.9 L V8	BF	11	(Canada) Doug Mills	9
(United States) Leavy - Hamilton Safe	Chevrolet Camaro (Riley & Scott)	Chevrolet 5.9 L V8	BF	11	(United States) Jon Leavy	9
(United States) DM Motorsports	Chevrolet Camaro (Evans)	Chevrolet 6.0 L V8	G	13	(United States) Martin Shuster	1
(United States) DM Motorsports	Chevrolet Camaro (Evans)	Chevrolet 6.0 L V8	G	13	(United States) Mark Montgomery	1
(United States) DM Motorsports	Chevrolet Camaro (Evans)	Chevrolet 6.0 L V8	G	13	(United States) Anthony Puleo	1
(United States) Leavy Racing Enterprises, Inc.	Chevrolet Camaro (Creative)	Chevrolet 5.1 L V8	BF	18 118	(United States) Jon Leavy	3–5, 7–8
(United States) Leavy Racing Enterprises, Inc.	Chevrolet Camaro (Creative)	Chevrolet 5.1 L V8	BF	18 118	(United States) Michael Cohen	3–5
(United States) Leavy Racing Enterprises, Inc.	Chevrolet Camaro (Creative)	Chevrolet 5.1 L V8	BF	18 118	(United States) Ken Bupp	7–8
(United States) Carolina Racing Engines	Chevrolet Camaro (Dillon-Smith)	Chevrolet 6.0 L V8	BF	31	(United States) Gary Smith	9
(United States) Carolina Racing Engines	Chevrolet Camaro (Dillon-Smith)	Chevrolet 6.0 L V8	BF	31	(United States) Albert Ruiz	9
(United States) Rankin Racing	Chevrolet Camaro (Creative)	Chevrolet 5.8 L V8	G	40	(United States) David Rankin	1
(United States) Rankin Racing	Chevrolet Camaro (Creative)	Chevrolet 5.8 L V8	G	40	(The Bahamas) Dorian Foyil	1
(United States) Rankin Racing	Chevrolet Camaro (Creative)	Chevrolet 5.8 L V8	G	40	(El Salvador) Toto Lassally	1
(United States) Rankin Racing	Chevrolet Camaro (Creative)	Chevrolet 5.8 L V8	G	40	(United States) Hank Scott	1
(United States) Rankin Racing	Chevrolet Camaro (Creative)	Chevrolet 5.8 L V8	G	40	(United Kingdom) Ian James	1
(United States) Farrell-Seward Motorsports	Oldsmobile Aurora (Farrell/Seward)	Oldsmobile 5.9 L V8	BF	51	(United States) Glenn Seward	8–9
(United States) Farrell-Seward Motorsports	Oldsmobile Aurora (Farrell/Seward)	Oldsmobile 5.9 L V8	BF	51	(United States) David Galpin	8–9
(United States) Farrell-Seward Motorsports	Oldsmobile Aurora (Farrell/Seward)	Oldsmobile 5.9 L V8	BF	51	(United States) James Yeames	9
(United States) Mark Winkelman	Oldsmobile Cutlass (Howe)	Oldsmobile 5.9 L V8	G	52	(United States) Adam Andretti	1
(United States) Mark Winkelman	Oldsmobile Cutlass (Howe)	Oldsmobile 5.9 L V8	G	52	(United States) Ryan Hampton	1
(United States) Mark Winkelman	Oldsmobile Cutlass (Howe)	Oldsmobile 5.9 L V8	G	52	(United States) Robert Lloyd	1
(United States) Mark Winkelman	Oldsmobile Cutlass (Howe)	Oldsmobile 5.9 L V8	G	52	(United States) John Zouzelka	1
(United States) Diablo Racing	Chevrolet Camaro (Watson)	Chevrolet 5.1 L V8	G	53	(United States) Tom Scheuren	1
(United States) Diablo Racing	Chevrolet Camaro (Watson)	Chevrolet 5.1 L V8	G	53	(United States) Eric Curran	1
(United States) Diablo Racing	Chevrolet Camaro (Watson)	Chevrolet 5.1 L V8	G	53	(United States) Rick Dilorio	1
(United States) Diablo Racing	Chevrolet Camaro (Watson)	Chevrolet 5.1 L V8	G	53	(United States) Todd Snyder	1
(United States) Diablo Racing	Chevrolet Camaro (Watson)	Chevrolet 5.1 L V8	G	53	(United States) Mayo T. Smith	1
(United States) Sancheza Motorsports	Chevrolet Camaro (Weaver)	Chevrolet 5.1 L V8	G	65	(United States) Frank Sanchez	4
(United States) Sancheza Motorsports	Chevrolet Camaro (Weaver)	Chevrolet 5.1 L V8	G	65	(United States) Tony Ave	4
(United States) Dura "Fitted Garage" Motorsport	Chevrolet Camaro (???)	Chevrolet 6.3 L V8	H	71	(United States) Chris Thompson	1, 4–5, 8–9
(United States) Dura "Fitted Garage" Motorsport	Chevrolet Camaro (???)	Chevrolet 6.3 L V8	H	71	(United Kingdom) Michael DeFontes	1, 5, 9
(United States) Dura "Fitted Garage" Motorsport	Chevrolet Camaro (???)	Chevrolet 6.3 L V8	H	71	(United States) Jerry Thompson	1, 9
(United States) Dura "Fitted Garage" Motorsport	Chevrolet Camaro (???)	Chevrolet 6.3 L V8	H	71	(Canada) Doug Mills	4–5, 8
(United States) Dura "Fitted Garage" Motorsport	Chevrolet Camaro (???)	Chevrolet 6.3 L V8	H	71	(United States) Joe Danaher	4
(United States) Doran Lista Racing	Pontiac Grand Prix (Port City)	Pontiac 5.9 L V8	G	77	(United States) Tony Ave	9
(United States) Doran Lista Racing	Pontiac Grand Prix (Port City)	Pontiac 5.9 L V8	G	77	(United States) David Doran	9
(United States) Comer Racing Inc.	Chevrolet Camaro (Bemco)	Chevrolet 6.0 L V8	P	84	(United States) Andy McNeil	All
(United States) Comer Racing Inc.	Chevrolet Camaro (Bemco)	Chevrolet 6.0 L V8	P	84	(Canada) Doug Mills	1–3, 6–7, 9
(United States) Comer Racing Inc.	Chevrolet Camaro (Bemco)	Chevrolet 6.0 L V8	P	84	(United States) John Finger	1
(United States) Comer Racing Inc.	Chevrolet Camaro (Bemco)	Chevrolet 6.0 L V8	P	84	(United States) Richard Maugeri	1
(United States) Comer Racing Inc.	Chevrolet Camaro (Bemco)	Chevrolet 6.0 L V8	P	84	(United States) Ron Zitza	1
(United States) Comer Racing Inc.	Chevrolet Camaro (Bemco)	Chevrolet 6.0 L V8	P	84	(United States) Scott Deware	4–5
(United States) Comer Racing Inc.	Chevrolet Camaro (Bemco)	Chevrolet 6.0 L V8	P	84	(United States) Kerry Hitt	7–8
(United States) Comer Racing Inc.	Chevrolet Camaro (Bemco)	Chevrolet 6.0 L V8	P	84	(United States) Mayo T. Smith	9
(United States) John Annis Racing	Chevrolet Camaro (Bemco) (1) Chevrolet Camaro (Creative) (6)	Chevrolet 5.9 L V8	G	87	(United States) Mark Kennedy	1, 6
(United States) John Annis Racing	Chevrolet Camaro (Bemco) (1) Chevrolet Camaro (Creative) (6)	Chevrolet 5.9 L V8	G	87	(United States) John Annis	1
(United States) John Annis Racing	Chevrolet Camaro (Bemco) (1) Chevrolet Camaro (Creative) (6)	Chevrolet 5.9 L V8	G	87	(United States) Larry Baisden	1
(United States) John Annis Racing	Chevrolet Camaro (Bemco) (1) Chevrolet Camaro (Creative) (6)	Chevrolet 5.9 L V8	G	87	(United States) Bill Ladoniczki	1
(United States) John Annis Racing	Chevrolet Camaro (Bemco) (1) Chevrolet Camaro (Creative) (6)	Chevrolet 5.9 L V8	G	87	(United States) Steve Ladoniczki	1
(United States) John Annis Racing	Chevrolet Camaro (Bemco) (1) Chevrolet Camaro (Creative) (6)	Chevrolet 5.9 L V8	G	87	(United States) Buck Parker	6
(United States) RVO Motorsports	Chevrolet Camaro (Auto Concepts)	Chevrolet 5.7 L V8	G	91	(United States) Roger Schramm	7, 9
(United States) RVO Motorsports	Chevrolet Camaro (Auto Concepts)	Chevrolet 5.7 L V8	G	91	(United States) Werner Frank	7, 9
(United States) RVO Motorsports	Chevrolet Camaro (Auto Concepts)	Chevrolet 5.7 L V8	G	91	(United States) Irv Hoerr	7, 9
(United States) A General Kinetics	Chevrolet Camaro (Dillon)	Chevrolet 6.1 L V8	G	94	(United States) Don Arpin	1, 6
(United States) A General Kinetics	Chevrolet Camaro (Dillon)	Chevrolet 6.1 L V8	G	94	(United States) Paul Jenkins	1
(United States) A General Kinetics	Chevrolet Camaro (Dillon)	Chevrolet 6.1 L V8	G	94	(United States) Steve Lisa	1
(United States) A General Kinetics	Chevrolet Camaro (Dillon)	Chevrolet 6.1 L V8	G	94	(United States) Bill Beilharz	1
(United States) A General Kinetics	Chevrolet Camaro (Dillon)	Chevrolet 6.1 L V8	G	94	(United Kingdom) Mark Reed	1
(United States) A General Kinetics	Chevrolet Camaro (Dillon)	Chevrolet 6.1 L V8	G	94	(United States) Anthony Puleo	6

== Results ==
Overall winners in bold.

Rnd	Circuit	SR Winning Teams	SRII Winning Teams	GTO Winning Teams	GTU Winning Teams	AGT Winning Teams
Rnd	Circuit	SR Winning Drivers	SRII Winning Drivers	GTO Winning Drivers	GTU Winning Drivers	AGT Winning Drivers
1	Daytona	(United States) #20 Dyson Racing Team	No entries	**(France) #91 Viper Team Oreca**	(Switzerland) #56 Haberthur Racing	(United States) #84 Comer Racing Inc.
1	Daytona	(United Kingdom) James Weaver (United States) Rob Dyson (Italy) Max Papis (United States) Elliot Forbes-Robinson	No entries	(Monaco) **Olivier Beretta** (Austria) **Karl Wendlinger** (France) **Dominique Dupuy**	(Italy) Luca Drudi (Italy) Fabio Babini (Italy) Fabio Rosa (Italy) Gabrio Rosa	(United States) John Finger (United States) Doug Mills (United States) Richard Maugeri (United States) Andy McNeil (United States) Ron Zitza
2	Phoenix	**(United States) #74 Robinson Racing**	(United States) #22 Archangel Motorsports Services	(United States) #5 Saleen-Allen Speedlab	(United States) #50 Genesis Racing	(United States) #09 The Spirit of Daytona
2	Phoenix	(United States) **Jack Baldwin** (United States) **Irv Hoerr**	(United States) Larry Oberto (United States) Ryan Hampton	(United States) Ron Johnson (United States) Terry Borcheller	(United States) Rick Fairbanks (United States) Bill Auberlen	(United States) Craig Conway (United States) Doug Goad
3	Homestead	**(United States) #27 Doran Lista Racing**	(United States) #22 Archangel Motorsports Services	(United States) #5 Saleen-Allen Speedlab	(United States) #81 G&W Motorsports	(United States) #118 Leavy Racing Enterprises, Inc.
3	Homestead	(Italy) **Mauro Baldi** (Belgium) **Didier Theys**	(United States) Larry Oberto (United States) Ryan Hampton	(United States) Ron Johnson (United States) Terry Borcheller	(United States) Mike Fitzgerald (United States) Darren Law	(United States) Jon Leavy (United States) Michael Cohen
4^{†}	Lime Rock	**(United States) #16 Dyson Racing Team**	(United States) #22 Archangel Motorsports Services	**(United States) #5 Saleen-Allen Speedlab**	(United States) #50 Genesis Racing	(United States) #09 The Spirit of Daytona
4^{†}	Lime Rock	(United Kingdom) **James Weaver** (United States) **Butch Leitzinger**	(United States) Larry Oberto (United States) Ryan Hampton	**(United States) Ron Johnson** (United States) **Terry Borcheller**	(United States) Rick Fairbanks (United States) Bill Auberlen	(United States) Craig Conway (United States) Doug Goad
5	Mid-Ohio	**(United States) #74 Robinson Racing**	(United States) #22 Archangel Motorsports Services	(Canada) #0 Doncaster Racing	(United States) #81 G&W Motorsports	(United States) #09 The Spirit of Daytona
5	Mid-Ohio	(United States) **Jack Baldwin** **(United States) George Robinson**	(United States) Larry Oberto (United States) Ryan Hampton	(Canada) David Lacey (Canada) Greg Wilkins	(United States) Mike Fitzgerald (United States) Darren Law	(United States) Craig Conway (United States) Doug Goad
6	Daytona	**(United States) #16 Dyson Racing Team**	(United States) #22 Archangel Motorsports Services	(United States) #46 Team Viper West	(United States) #81 G&W Motorsports	(United States) #09 The Spirit of Daytona
6	Daytona	(United Kingdom) **James Weaver** **(United Kingdom) Andy Wallace**	(United States) Larry Oberto (United States) Ryan Hampton	(United States) Erik Messley (United States) Marty Miller	(United States) Mike Fitzgerald (United States) Darren Law	(United States) Craig Conway (United States) Doug Goad
7	Road America	**(United States) #27 Doran Lista Racing**	(United States) #99 Snow/Schumacher Racing	(United States) #5 Saleen-Allen Speedlab	(United States) #81 G&W Motorsports	(United States) #91 RVO Motorsports
7	Road America	(Italy) **Mauro Baldi** **(Switzerland) Fredy Lienhard, Sr** (Belgium) **Didier Theys**	(United States) Martin Snow (United States) Larry Schumacher	(United States) Ron Johnson (United States) Terry Borcheller	(United States) Mike Fitzgerald (United States) Darren Law	(United States) Irv Hoerr (United States) Roger Schramm (United States) Werner Frank
8	Trois-Rivières	**(United States) #16 Dyson Racing Team**	(United States) #22 Archangel Motorsports Services	(United States) #5 Saleen-Allen Speedlab	(United States) #50 Genesis Racing	(United States) #09 The Spirit of Daytona
8	Trois-Rivières	(United Kingdom) **James Weaver** (United States) **Butch Leitzinger**	(United States) Larry Oberto (United States) Ryan Hampton	(United States) Ron Johnson (United States) Terry Borcheller	(United States) Rick Fairbanks (United States) Andy Pilgrim	(United States) Craig Conway (United States) Doug Goad
9	Watkins Glen	**(United States) #16 Dyson Racing Team**	(United States) #62 Team Spencer Motorsports	(United States) #5 Saleen-Allen Speedlab	(United States) #81 G&W Motorsports	(United States) #09 The Spirit of Daytona
9	Watkins Glen	(United Kingdom) **James Weaver** (United States) **Butch Leitzinger** **(United Kingdom) Andy Wallace**	(United States) Dennis Spencer (United States) Rich Grupp (United States) Ralph Thomas	(United States) Ron Johnson (United States) Terry Borcheller	(United States) Mike Fitzgerald (United States) Darren Law	(United States) Craig Conway (United States) Doug Goad (United States) Troy Flis

† - Two separate individual races were held for the GT classes and SR classes for an equal distance.
