= Virginia's 14th House of Delegates district =

Virginia legislative district

Virginia's 14th State House of Delegates district
- District map from the 2023 election
Delegate
| Vivian Watts; D–Fairfax County |
- Demographics: 36% White; 11% Black; 24% Hispanic; 21% Asian; 0% Native American; 0% Hawaiian/Pacific Islander; 1% Other; 5% Multiracial
- Population (2024) • Voting age: 81,737; 18
- Registered voters: 53,608

Virginia's 14th House of Delegates district elects one of 100 seats in the Virginia House of Delegates, the lower house of the state's bicameral legislature. District 14 represents parts of Fairfax County. The seat is currently held by Vivian Watts.

== District officeholders ==
| Years | Delegate | Party | Electoral history |
|---|---|---|---|
| January 12, 1972 – January 13, 1982 | Calvin W. Fowler | Democratic | |
| January 13, 1982 – January 12, 1983 | Frank Slayton | Democratic | |
| January 12, 1983 – January 9, 2002 | Richard Cranwell | Democratic | Majority Leader of the Virginia House of Delegates (1991-2000); Minority Leader of the Virginia House of Delegates (2000–02); Retired after district was gerrymandered |
| January 9, 2002 – January 10, 2024 | Daniel W. Marshall III | Republican | First elected in 2001 (redistricted to the 49th District) |
| January 10, 2024 – present | Vivian Watts | Democratic | Redistricted from the 39th District |

== Electoral history ==
| Date | Election | Candidate | Party | Votes | % |
Virginia House of Delegates, 14th district
| Nov 6, 2001 | General | D W Marshall III | Republican | 11,652 | 60.44 |
| Nov 6, 2001 | General | J E Glaise | Democratic | 7,613 | 39.49 |
| Nov 6, 2001 | General | Write Ins | | 14 | 0.07 |
| Nov 6, 2001 | General | C. Richard Cranwell was redistricted out; seat switched from Democratic to Republican | | | |
| Nov 4, 2003 | General | D W Marshall III | Republican | 6,177 | 99.90 |
| Nov 4, 2003 | General | Write Ins | | 6 | 0.10 |
| Nov 8, 2005 | General | D W Marshall III | Republican | 10,593 | 99.48 |
| Nov 8, 2005 | General | Write Ins | | 55 | 0.52 |
| Nov 6, 2007 | General | D. W. "Danny" Marshall III | Republican | 8,375 | 51.88 |
| Nov 6, 2007 | General | Adam J. Tomer | Democratic | 7,746 | 47.98 |
| Nov 6, 2007 | General | Write Ins | | 22 | 0.13 |
| Nov 3, 2009 | General | D. W. "Danny" Marshall III | Republican | 10,313 | 64.11 |
| Nov 3, 2009 | General | F. Seward Anderson, Jr. | Democratic | 5,755 | 35.77 |
| Nov 3, 2009 | General | Write Ins | | 18 | 0.11 |
| Nov 8, 2011 | General | D. W. "Danny" Marshall III | Republican | 12,921 | 98.89 |
| Nov 8, 2011 | General | Write Ins | | 144 | 1.10 |
| Nov 5, 2013 | General | Daniel Webster Marshall, III | Republican | 12,336 | 58.7 |
| Nov 5, 2013 | General | Gary Price Miller | Democratic | 7,988 | 38.0 |
| Nov 5, 2013 | General | Write Ins | | 20 | 0.1 |
| Nov 3, 2015 | General | Daniel Webster Marshall, III | Republican | 9,821 | 98.4 |
| Nov 3, 2015 | General | Write Ins | | 161 | 1.6 |
| Nov 7, 2017 | General | Daniel Webster Marshall, III | Republican | 15,505 | 96.8 |
| Nov 7, 2017 | General | Write Ins | | 507 | 3.2 |
| Nov 5, 2019 | General | Daniel Webster Marshall, III | Republican | 12,139 | 61.2 |
| Nov 5, 2019 | General | Eric Wayne Stamps | Democratic | 7,654 | 38.6 |
| Nov 5, 2019 | General | Write Ins | | 26 | 0.1 |
| Nov 5, 2019 | General | Daniel Webster Marshall, III | Republican | 12,139 | 61.2 |
| Nov 5, 2019 | General | Eric Wayne Stamps | Democratic | 7,654 | 38.6 |
| Nov 5, 2019 | General | Write Ins | | 26 | 0.1 |
| Nov 2, 2021 | General | Daniel Webster Marshall, III | Republican | 17,750 | 65.6 |
| Nov 2, 2021 | General | Sarah Margaret Deitz | Democratic | 9,286 | 34.3 |
| Nov 2, 2021 | General | Write Ins | | 32 | 0.1 |
| Nov 7, 2023 | General | Vivian E. Watts | Democratic | 13,870 | 69.4 |
| Nov 7, 2023 | General | Curtis L. Wells Jr. | Republican | 6,056 | 30.3 |
| Nov 7, 2023 | General | Write Ins | | 56 | 0.3 |
