= Rolex Sports Car Series =

Former racing series

- Country: North America
- Inaugural season: 2000
- Folded: 2013
- Fate: Merged with the American Le Mans Series to become the IMSA SportsCar Championship
- Prototype classes: DP
- GT classes: GT, GX
- Tyre suppliers: Continental
- Last Drivers' champion: DP: Max Angelelli, Jordan Taylor; GT: Alessandro Balzan; GX: Jim Norman
- Last Makes' champion: DP: Chevrolet/Riley; GT: Ferrari; GX: Mazda
- Last Teams' champion: DP: Chip Ganassi Racing; GT: Scuderia Corsa; GX: BGB Motorsports
- Official website: http://www.grand-am.com

The Rolex Sports Car Series was the premier series run by the Grand American Road Racing Association. It was a North American-based sports car series founded in 2000 under the name Grand American Road Racing Championship to replace the failed United States Road Racing Championship. Rolex took over as series sponsor in 2002.

It ran a mixture of classes of sports prototypes and Grand Touring-style cars. In 2003, the series debuted their custom prototype chassis, known as Daytona Prototypes, named after their premiere event, the Rolex 24 at Daytona.

The series staged the North American Endurance Championship, featuring three of its premier races at Daytona, Watkins Glen, and Indianapolis.

On September 5, 2012, Grand-Am announced that it would be merging the Rolex Sports Car Series with the American Le Mans Series to form a unified road racing championship to be known as United SportsCar Racing, later retitled as the TUDOR United Sports Car Championship. The final Rolex Sports Car Series race was held on September 28, 2013 at Lime Rock Park.

== History ==
Following the failure of the United States Road Racing Championship in 1999, the new Grand American Road Racing Association announced their intentions to adopt a format similar to the one used in the USRRC, centering on the 24 Hours of Daytona. This series was seen as an alternative to the former IMSA GT Championship, which had since been replaced by the American Le Mans Series in 1999. The new series would run two classes of Sports Racing Prototypes identical to the rules used in the new FIA Sportscar Championship in Europe, while Grand Touring-style cars would consist of three classes: GTO for larger production-based race cars, GTU for smaller production-based race cars, and AGT for American tube frame cars. The league would also acquire the Six Hours of Watkins Glen, giving the league a second endurance race alongside the Rolex 24 at Daytona to compete with the ALMS' 12 Hours of Sebring and Petit Le Mans. GTO and GTU would be renamed GTS and GT for 2001 to better match the classes used by the similar American Le Mans Series.

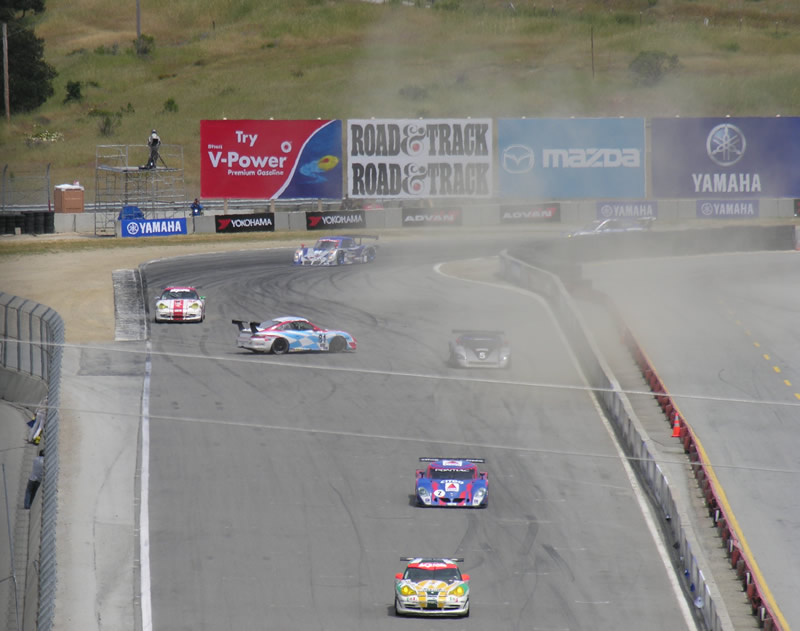
A GT-class Porsche spinning out after navigating a curve at the 2005 Grand-Am Road & Track 250 at Laguna Seca

2003 would see the series go through a radical change, as Daytona Prototypes debuted for the first time to replace both of the Sports Racing Prototype classes. Although SRPs would be allowed to continue until the end of 2003, few were seen while the Daytona Prototypes took over the series. The American GT class was also dissolved with the cars being placed into the similar GTS class.

In 2004, the faster GTS class was abandoned in order to provide a larger gap between the Daytona Prototypes and GT cars. The GTS cars were as fast (if not faster) than the Daytona Prototypes. This meant that the GT class was now the top tier, being joined by the Super Grand Sport (SGS) class moved up from the Grand Am Cup series. This was further streamlined in 2005 with all Grand Touring-style cars being in a single GT class.

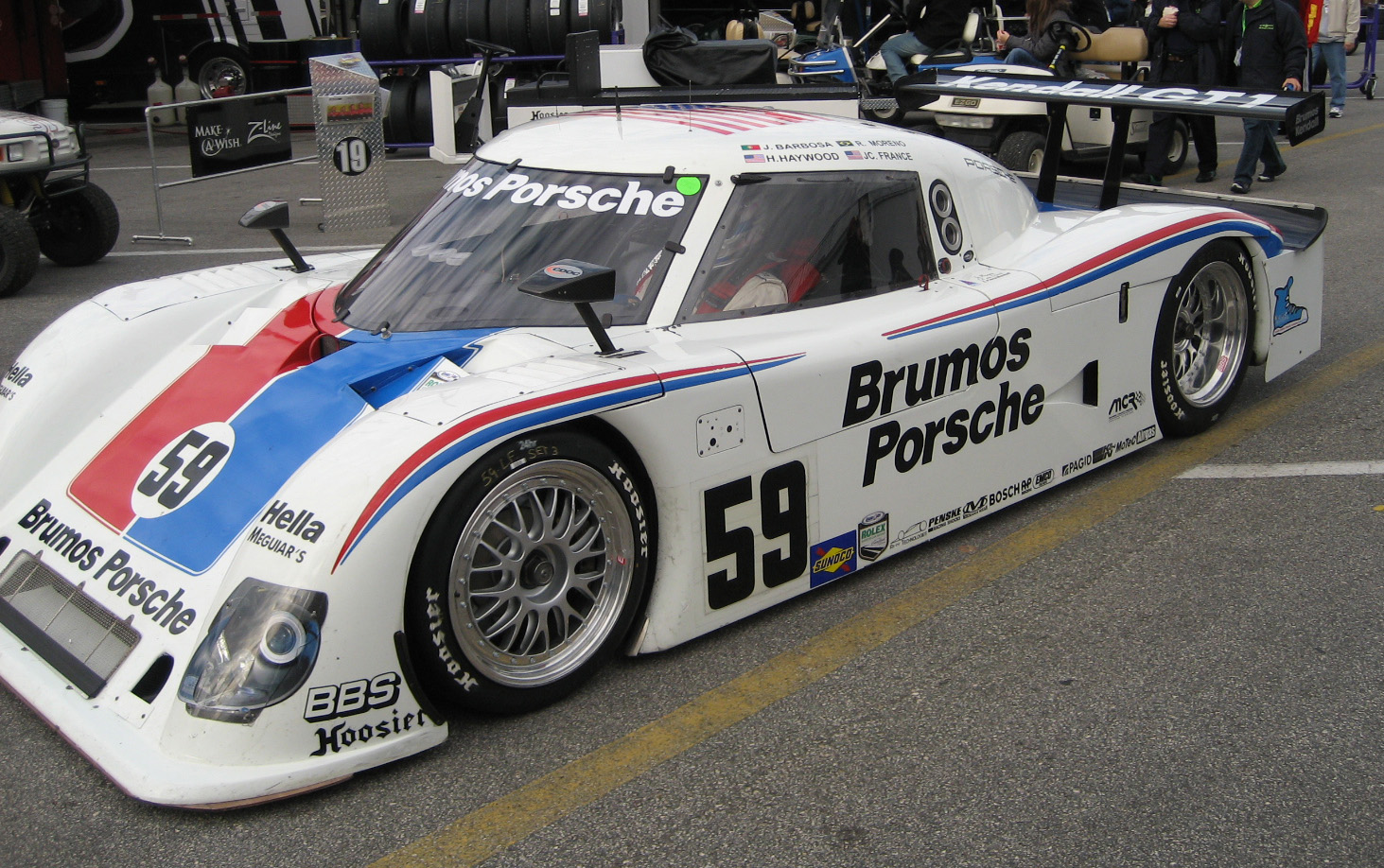
A 2007 Riley MkXI Daytona Prototype seen as the 2007 Rolex 24 At Daytona.

This formula led to the Rolex Sports Car Series having a large number of competitors at most events, mostly due to the ease of use and low cost of the cars in either class while the Grand American Road Racing Association was able to keep the competition equalized.

With such high car counts, Grand-Am has had to split GT and DP races at shorter tracks where it is not feasible to put 50 cars on the track at one instance. In each case, the GT cars race on Saturday, and the DP cars race on Sunday. This split format allows drivers to run both races. Each race is the same distance, as it would be if the two classes were running together. This did however make GT races slightly longer than combined events, since GT cars would likely finish several laps behind the winning prototype and thus not cover the full distance.

When the GT and DP races were combined, the two classes would use a motorcycle racing-style "wave start," a concept from Roger Edmonson, who had been in motorcycle racing before organising the Grand American series with the France family. In this case, the DP cars would take the green flag first, followed, usually 20–30 seconds later (depending on track length) by the GT cars. By starting the cars separately, the organisers hoped for safer starts by having the two classes of cars race separately.

Due to the series' affiliation with NASCAR, many Sprint Cup Series drivers occasionally participated in Rolex Series races, particularly the 24 Hours of Daytona.

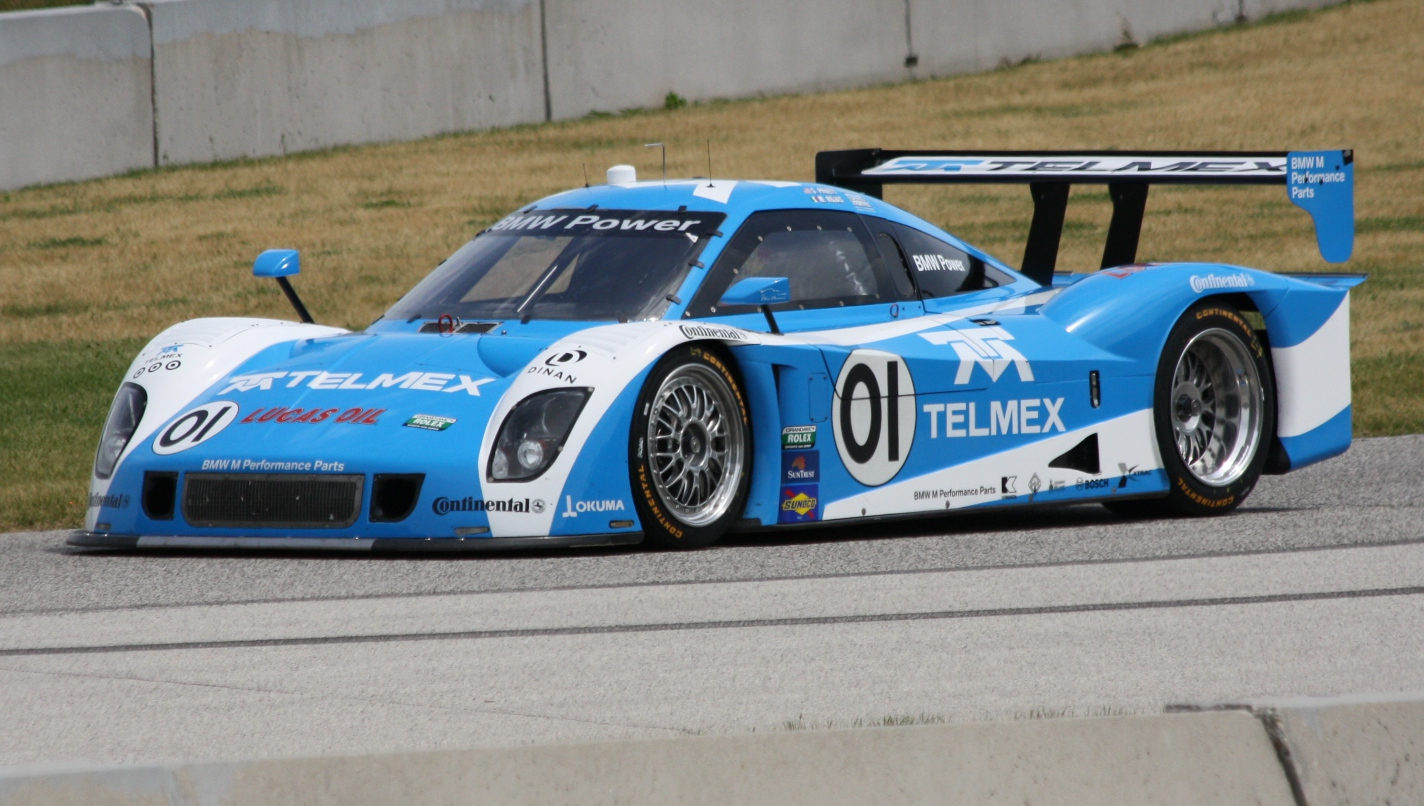
Pruett/Rojas at Road America, champions in 2012

== Tire partner history ==
The tire manufacturers war in Rolex Sports Car Series began in the 2000 season with Michelin, Dunlop, Goodyear, Avon, Pirelli, Hoosier and Yokohama were tire suppliers until 2001 season. Starting in 2002 season, the tire manufacturers war were reduced to just two suppliers as Dunlop and Goodyear were only Grand-Am Rolex Sports Car Series tire manufacturers until 2004 season. As the tire manufacturers war were ended after 2004 season, in 2005 Hoosier Racing Tire took over as official single tire partner of Grand-Am Rolex Sports Car Series that lasted through 2007 season. Started in 2008, Pirelli took over the tire partner role of Grand-Am Rolex Sports Car Series that lasted through 2010 season. As Pirelli confirmed of Grand-Am Rolex Sports Car Series departure to Formula One, GP2 Asia Series and GP2 Series in 2011 after the FIA World Motor Sport Council meeting verdict in Geneva, Switzerland on June 24, 2010, Continental took over the official tire partner role until the series merged into WeatherTech SportsCar Championship in 2014.

== Series champions ==
Season	Classes				
2000	SR	SRII	GTO	GTU	AGT
2000	(United Kingdom) James Weaver	(United States) Ryan Hampton (United States) Larry Oberto	(United States) Terry Borcheller (United States) Ron Johnson	(United States) Mike Fitzgerald	(United States) Doug Mills
2001	SRP	SRPII	GTS	GT	AGT
2001	(United Kingdom) James Weaver	(United States) Andy Lally	(United States) Chris Bingham	(United States) Darren Law	(United States) Craig Conway (United States) Doug Goad
2002	(Belgium) Didier Theys	(United States) Terry Borcheller	(United States) Chris Bingham	(United States) Bill Auberlen (United States) Cort Wagner	(United States) Kerry Hitt
2003	DP	SRPII	GTS		GT
2003	(United States) Terry Borcheller	(United States) Steve Marshall	(United States) Tommy Riggins (United States) Dave Machavern		(United States) Cort Wagner (United States) Brent Martini
2004	DP		GT	SGS	
2004	(Italy) Max Papis (United States) Scott Pruett		(United States) Bill Auberlen	(United States) Andy Lally (United States) Marc Bunting	
2005	DP		GT		
2005	(Italy) Max Angelelli (South Africa) Wayne Taylor		(United States) Craig Stanton		
2006	(Germany) Jörg Bergmeister		(United States) Andy Lally (United States) Marc Bunting		
2007	(United States) Alex Gurney (United States) Jon Fogarty		(Germany) Dirk Werner		
2008	(United States) Scott Pruett (Mexico) Memo Rojas		(United States) Paul Edwards (United States) Kelly Collins		
2009	(United States) Alex Gurney (United States) Jon Fogarty		(United States) Leh Keen (Germany) Dirk Werner		
2010	(United States) Scott Pruett (Mexico) Memo Rojas		(United States) Emil Assentato (United States) Jeff Segal		
2011	(United States) Scott Pruett (Mexico) Memo Rojas		(United States) Leh Keen (United States) Andrew Davis		
2012	(United States) Scott Pruett (Mexico) Memo Rojas		(United States) Emil Assentato (United States) Jeff Segal		
2013	DP		GT		GX
2013	(Italy) Max Angelelli (United States) Jordan Taylor		(Italy) Alessandro Balzan		(United States) Jim Norman

== Television ==
Speed Channel was the near-exclusive broadcaster of the Rolex Sports Car Series and included coverage of the 6 Hours of Watkins Glen and the 24 Hours of Daytona. On August 17, 2013, Fox Sports 1 became the new near-exclusive broadcaster for the Rolex Sports Car Series until 2014 when both Rolex Sports Car Series and American Le Mans Series form United Sports Car Racing.

== See also ==
- Daytona Prototype – the sports prototypes used in the league
- Continental Tire Sports Car Challenge – the league's support series
