= Ryan Hampton (racing driver) =

American racing driver (born 1974)

- Nationality: (United States) American
- Born: April 17, 1974 (age 52) Duarte, California, U.S.

Indy Lights
- Years active: 2002, 2004
- Teams: Ryan Hampton Racing; Brian Stewart Racing
- Starts: 6
- Wins: 1
- Poles: 1
- Best finish: 9th in 2002

Previous series
- 2002, 2004 2000–2002 1996–1999 1996 1994–1995 1992–1993: Indy Lights; Rolex Sports Car Series; USF2000; Formula Continental; SCCA ITB; Karting

Ryan Hampton (born 17 April 1974 in Duarte, California) is an American former Indy Lights driver. Besides racing cars in races he also competed in drift competitions.

== Career ==
Hampton started his karting career in 1992 with the International Kart Federation. After racing touring cars in 1994 and 1995, Hampton made his open-wheel debut in 1996. The racing driver from California competed a Van Diemen in the SCCA Formula Continental class. The young driver also made his debut in the USF2000 in 1996. After failing to qualify at Walt Disney World Speedway his first start was at Phoenix International Raceway. At the Arizona track Hampton failed to finish. Hampton started three more USF2000 races with a best finish of tenth at Watkins Glen International.

Hampton scored his first USF2000 win in 1997. At Charlotte Motor Speedway, North Carolina a fierce battle for the win occurred between Hampton and Matt Sielsky. Hampton made a decisive pass for the win in lap 26 out of thirty. Despite missing the first two races of the season, Hampton ended up sixth in the season standings. For 1998, Hampton was a championship contender in USF2000. Hampton won three races, one at Watkins Glen International and two at Charlotte Motor Speedway. However a devastating final race weekend obliterated his championship hopes. In the first race Hampton suffered car troubles. In the second race Hampton was disqualified as there was a foreign substance discovered on the cars tires in post-race technical inspection. Hampton finished second in the standings. For 1999 Hampton raced a partial season in USF2000. At the end of the season Hampton, and Larry Foyt, attended the Indy Racing League rookie test at Texas Motor Speedway. Hampton passed the rookie test in a Dallara IR9, previously raced by Billy Boat.

=== Grand-Am ===
In 1998, Hampton made his debut in the 24 Hours of Daytona. Hampton joined Kryderacing which entered a Nissan 240SX in the GT3 class. The car failed to finish due to a failed engine. The following year Hampton joined Pettit Racing in a Mazda RX-7. The car finished in thirtieth place overall.

For 2000, Hampton joined Archangel Motorsport Services for the full season in the Rolex Sports Car Series SRPII class. Hampton, and teammate Larry Oberto, first raced a Chevrolet powered Magnum SC205 the team switched to the popular Lola B2K/40. The team scored five class wins and Hampton and Oberto were crowned SRPII class champions. Winning the championship earned him a U.S. F2000 Hall of Fame nomination. The following year Hampton joined Team Spencer Motorsports, again in the SRPII class. Racing a Kudzu Hampton was joined by Rich Grupp and Barry Waddell to score a class win at Watkins Glen International. The Californian remained at Team Spencer Motorsports for 2002 again running a partial schedule.

=== Indy Lights ===
Willing to return to open wheel racing, Hampton founded Ryan Hampton Racing for the Indy Lights. Hampton made his debut at Michigan International Speedway finishing seventh. At Gateway International Raceway the young driver won his first Indy Lights race. Hampton beat Arie Luyendyk Jr. and Ed Carpenter. The California driver lead each lap of the thirty lap race. Hampton made a final appearance in the series in 2004. With sponsorship by Bush-Cheney '04, Hampton started tenth but crashed out of the race.

=== Drifting ===
In 2005, Hampton joined Falken Tire for their second Formula D season. Besides Formula D, Hampton also competed in the Falken Tire 1969 Chevrolet Camaro in D1GP.

== Personal ==
Hampton currently lives in San Antonio, Texas. In his early career Hampton was an instructor at Willow Springs International Motorsports Park, Panoz Racing School and the Bob Bondurant School of High Performance Driving. Hampton is currently employed by Cooper Tire & Rubber Company. The American racing driver is a Citrus College graduate.

== Complete motorsports results ==
=== American Open-Wheel racing results ===
(key) (Races in bold indicate pole position, races in italics indicate fastest race lap)

==== Complete USF2000 National Championship results ====
Year	Entrant	1	2	3	4	5	6	7	8	9	10	11	12	13	14	Pos	Points
1996		WDW; DNQ	STP	PIR	DSC1; 51	MOS	IRP	RIR	WGI1; 10	WGI2; 28	MID; 18	NHS	LVS; DNQ			**N.C.**	**N.C.**
1997	Archangel Motorsport Services	WDW	STP	PIR; 15	DSC1; 5	DSC2; 3	SAV; 10	PPI; 16	CHA1; 1	CHA2; 2	MID; 9	WGI; 34	WGI; 28			**6th**	**133**
1998	Tatuus	WDW; 11	PIR; 4	HMS1; 2	HMS2; 3	WGI; 4	WGI; 1	MID1; 5	MIN; 2	**CHA1**; 1	**CHA2**; 1	MID2; 36	**ATL**; 7	PPI1; 28	PPI2; DSQ	**2nd**	**275**
1999	Archangel Motorsport Services	PIR; 12	CHA1; 32	CHA2; 30	MOS	MOS	MID	ATL	ROA1	ROA2	CTR	MID	PPI; 18	SEB1	SEB2	**30th**	**10**

==== Indy Lights ====
Year	Team	1	2	3	4	5	6	7	8	9	10	11	12	Rank	Points
2002	Ryan Hampton Racing	KAN	NSH	MIS; 7	KTY; 12	**STL**; 1	CHI; 14	TXS; 3						**9th**	**147**
2004	Brian Stewart Racing	HMS	PHX	INDY	KAN	NSH	MIL	MIS	KTY	PPIR	CHI	FON	TXS; 14	**27th**	**16**

=== Sports Car racing ===
==== Rolex Sports Car Series results ====
(key) (Races in bold indicate pole position, Results are overall/class)

Rolex Sports Car Series results
Year	Team	No.	Make	Class	1	2	3	4	5	6	7	8	9	10	11	12	Points
2000	Archangel Motorsport Services	22	Lola	SRPII	DAY1	PIR; 9 / 1	HOM; 7 / 1	LRP; 7 / 1	MOH; 7 / 1	DAY2; 6 / 1	ROA; 7 / 3	CTR; 7 / 1	WAT; 38 / 3				274
2001	Team Spencer Motorsports	62	Kudzu	SRPII	DAY1; 20 / 2	HOM	PIR	WAT; 4 / 1	LRP1	LRP2	MOH	ROA	CTR1	CTR2	DAY2		73
2002	Team Spencer Motorsports	62	Kudzu	SRPII	DAY1; 29 / 3	HOM	CAL	PIR	WAT1	DAY2	WAT2	VIR	CMT	DAY3			30
2003	Ferri Competizione	34	Ferrari	GT	DAY1; 11 / 5	HOM	PIR	BAR	CAL	WAT1	MID	DAY3	WAT2	CMT	VIR	DAY2	26

==== American Le Mans Series results ====
(key) (Races in bold indicate pole position, Results are overall/class)

American Le Mans Series results
Year	Team	No.	Make	Class	1	2	3	4	5	6	7	8	9	10	Points
2002	Team Spencer Motorsports	62	Lola	LMP675	SEB	SON; 25 / 4	MID	ROA	WAS	CTR	MOS	LAG; 32 / 7	MIA	ATL; 45 / 9	18
