= Clarke Hogan =

Virginia politician (born 1969)

Member of the Virginia House of Delegates from the 60th district
- In office January 9, 2002 – January 13, 2010
- Preceded by: Ted Bennett
- Succeeded by: James Edmunds II

Personal details
- Born: July 21, 1969 (age 57) Roanoke Rapids, North Carolina
- Party: Republican
- Spouse: Ellen Gray Maybank
- Children: Richard, Monte, Douglas, Elizabeth
- Education: University of the South
- Occupation: Businessman
- Committees: Agriculture, Chesapeake and Natural Resources; Appropriations; Rules

Clarke N. Hogan (born July 21, 1969, in Roanoke Rapids, North Carolina) is an American politician of the Republican Party. From 2002 to 2010 he was a member of the Virginia House of Delegates. He represented the 60th district in Southside Virginia, consisting of Charlotte and Halifax Counties, plus parts of Nottoway and Prince Edward Counties.

On March 9, 2009, Hogan announced that he would not seek reelection.
