= Crystal Hill, Virginia =

Unincorporated community in Virginia, United States

- Unincorporated community
- Location within Virginia Location within the United States
- Coordinates: 36°51′21″N 78°54′32″W
- Country: United States
- State: Virginia
- County: Halifax
- Elevation: 561 ft (171 m)
- Time zone: UTC-5 (Eastern (EST))
  - Summer (DST): UTC-4 (EDT)
- ZIP code: 24539
- Area code: 434
- GNIS feature ID: 1495446

Crystal Hill is an unincorporated community in Halifax County, Virginia, United States. Crystal Hill is located on State Route 626, 6.3 miles (10.1 km) north of Halifax. Crystal Hill has a post office with ZIP code 24539, which opened on March 6, 1879. Politician Howard P. Anderson was a native of Crystal Hill.
