= Roy B. Davis =

American politician (1887–1960)

Member of the Virginia House of Delegates from the Halifax County district
- In office 1932–1957
- Preceded by: William M. Tuck
- Succeeded by: Howard P. Anderson

Personal details
- Born: November 22, 1887 Paces, Virginia, U.S.
- Died: October 18, 1960 (aged 72) Paces, Virginia, U.S.
- Resting place: Halifax Memorial Gardens
- Party: Democratic
- Spouse: Blanche Crews Tune
- Children: 3
- Occupation: Politician; farmer

Roy B. Davis (November 22, 1887 – October 18, 1960) was an American politician and farmer from Virginia. He served as a member of the Virginia House of Delegates, representing Halifax County from 1932 to 1957.

== Early life ==
Roy B. Davis was born on November 22, 1887, to Ellen (née Kent) and Benjamin Courtland Davis, in Paces, Virginia. He was educated in public and private schools.

== Career ==
Davis was a Democrat and was a member of the Halifax County Democratic Committee since 1931. He was elected in 1931 to serve Halifax County in the Virginia House of Delegates. He served from 1932 until his retirement in 1957. He was a member of the Byrd Organization. He led the special committee on redistricting house and senate districts during the 1951–1952 session. He served as chairman of the privileges and elections committee. In 1955, he served as co-chairman of the hearings about school segregation. He was succeeded by Howard P. Anderson

Davis farmed tobacco in Halifax County with his son Roy Jr. He was president of the Virginia Farm Bureau Federation. He was a member of the board of trustees of Hargrave Military Academy.

== Personal life ==
Davis married Blanche Crews Tune. They had a son and two daughters, Roy Jr., Mrs. Cecil B. Dickson and Mrs. Andrew Todd. He raised his successor in the General Assembly from a young age, Howard P. Anderson. He was chairman of the board of deacons of Mt. Zion Baptist Church.

Davis died of a heart attack on October 18, 1960, at his home in Paces. He was buried in Halifax Memorial Gardens.
