= Danny Marshall =

American politician (born 1952)

Member of the Virginia House of Delegates
- In office January 9, 2002 – January 14, 2026
- Preceded by: Richard Cranwell
- Constituency: 14th district (2002–2024); 49th district (2024–present)

Personal details
- Born: Daniel Webster Marshall III; January 20, 1952 (age 74) Danville, Virginia, U.S.
- Party: Republican
- Spouse: Kaye Hardy Marshall
- Children: Jessica Younginer
- Education: Danville Community College
- Occupation: Businessman (concrete products) race car driver
- Committees: Agriculture, Chesapeake and Natural Resources; Commerce and Labor; Counties, Cities and Towns
- Website: dannymarshall.com

Daniel Webster Marshall III (born January 20, 1952) is an American politician and race car driver. He was a member of the Danville, Virginia city council 2000–2001. He was a Republican member of the Virginia House of Delegates from 2002 to 2026, representing the 49th district, made up of Danville and parts of Henry and Pittsylvania Counties. In February 2025, Marshall announced his decision to not run for re-election.

== Electoral history ==
Date	Election	Candidate	Party	Votes	%
Virginia House of Delegates, 14th district
November 6, 2001	General	D W Marshall III	Republican	11,652	60.44
November 6, 2001	General	J E Glaise	Democratic	7,613	39.49
November 6, 2001	General	Write Ins		14	0.07
November 6, 2001	General	C. Richard Cranwell was redistricted out; seat switched from Democratic to Republican			
November 4, 2003	General	D W Marshall III	Republican	6,177	99.90
November 4, 2003	General	Write Ins		6	0.10
November 8, 2005	General	D W Marshall III	Republican	10,593	99.48
November 8, 2005	General	Write Ins		55	0.52
November 6, 2007	General	D. W. "Danny" Marshall III	Republican	8,375	51.88
November 6, 2007	General	Adam J. Tomer	Democratic	7,746	47.98
November 6, 2007	General	Write Ins		22	0.13
November 3, 2009	General	D. W. "Danny" Marshall III	Republican	10,313	64.11
November 3, 2009	General	F. Seward Anderson, Jr.	Democratic	5,755	35.77
November 3, 2009	General	Write Ins		18	0.11
November 8, 2011	General	D. W. "Danny" Marshall III	Republican	12,921	98.89
November 8, 2011	General	Write Ins		144	1.10
November 5, 2013	General	Daniel Webster Marshall, III	Republican	12,336	58.7
November 5, 2013	General	Gary Price Miller	Democratic	7,988	38
November 5, 2013	General	Mary Scott Martin	Independent	681	3.2
November 5, 2013	General	Write Ins		20	0.1
November 3, 2015	General	Daniel Webster Marshall, III	Republican	9,821	98.4
November 3, 2015	General	Write Ins		161	1.6
November 7, 2017	General	Daniel Webster Marshall, III	Republican	15,505	96.8
November 7, 2017	General	Write Ins		507	3.2
November 3, 2019	General	Daniel Webster Marshall, III	Republican	12,139	61.2
November 3, 2019	General	Eric Wayne Stamps	Democratic	7,654	38.6
November 3, 2019	General	Write Ins		26	0.1
