= Howard P. Anderson =

American politician

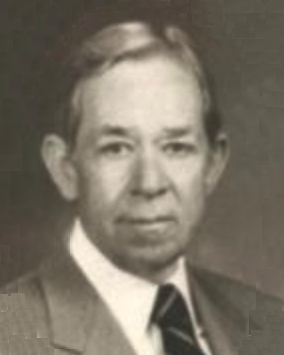

Member of the Virginia Senate from the 18th district
- In office January 12, 1972 – January 8, 1992
- Preceded by: David F. Thornton
- Succeeded by: Louise Lucas

Member of the Virginia House of Delegates for Halifax and South Boston
- In office January 8, 1958 – January 12, 1972
- Preceded by: Roy B. Davis
- Succeeded by: Frank Slayton

Personal details
- Born: Howard Palmer Anderson; May 25, 1915 Crystal Hill, Virginia, U.S.
- Died: November 1, 2000 (aged 85) South Boston, Virginia, U.S.
- Party: Democratic
- Spouse: Mildred Graham Webb (m. 1941; died 1992)
- Education: College of William & Mary; University of Richmond

Military service
- Branch/service: United States Navy
- Years of service: 1942–1946
- Rank: Lieutenant
- Battles/wars: World War II

Howard Palmer Anderson (May 25, 1915 – November 1, 2000) was a Virginia attorney and Democratic Party politician.

== Education, early career and family life ==
Howard Anderson was born in Halifax County, Virginia to Howard Putnam Anderson and the former Nancy Elizabeth Palmer.

He and his brother attended the local public schools. Anderson then attended the College of William and Mary, graduating in 1940. He then held various sales jobs during the next two years, and married his wife Mildred Webb in 1941. They had three sons who survived them, Howard P., John W. and David T. Anderson.

In 1942, during World War II, Anderson enlisted in the U.S. Navy. Commissioned as a Second Lieutenant, he served as a communications officer aboard ships in the Atlantic and Pacific Oceans. After the war ended, Anderson attended the University of Richmond Law School, and graduated in 1948.

== Career ==
Anderson became an FBI agent, and then established his own legal practice in Halifax county in 1950. He was active in the bar association, as well as Halifax School Board, and with the Ruritan Club, Masons, American Legion, Veterans of Foreign Wars and Virginia Farm Bureau.

Beginning in 1958, during the Massive Resistance crisis, Anderson served in the Virginia House of Delegates, representing Halifax County and South Boston, Virginia from 1958 until 1972. He succeeded Roy B. Davis. Anderson won the 35th District seat unopposed in 1957, 1959 and 1961, handily defeated Republicans Flournoy G. Lacks in 1963 and Weldon W. Tuck in 1965 in what had become the 34th District, and was again unopposed in 1967 and 1969.

In 1971, Anderson won election to the Virginia Senate, succeeding Byrd Democrat James D. Hagood in the 18th Senatorial district, comprising not only Halifax County, but also Appomattox, Buckingham, Lunenburg and Prince Edward counties and part of Campbell County, as well as the city of South Boston. Voters re-elected Anderson to the Virginia Senate several times before he announced his upcoming retirement in 1991. However, district boundaries changed significantly, such that he was succeeded by fellow Democrat Louise Lucas of Portsmouth who defeated Republican Frank Ruff in the general election to become the first African American female senator in Virginia.

Anderson also helped pass a Uranium mining moratorium in the Virginia General Assembly halting plans to excavate over 100 million pounds of uranium in Pittsylvania County. This moratorium still stands today, and is the bulwark of the anti-mining resistance within the state of Virginia.

== Death and legacy ==
Anderson died in 2000, survived by his three sons. He is buried at the Baptist cemetery in Halifax, and a local street is named after him.
