= James E. Edmunds =

American politician (born 1970)

James Edmunds

Member of the Virginia House of Delegates from the 60th district district
- In office January 13, 2010 – January 10, 2024
- Preceded by: Clarke Hogan
- Succeeded by: Scott Wyatt (redistricting)

Personal details
- Born: James Easley Edmunds II; July 21, 1970 (age 56) South Boston, Virginia
- Party: Republican
- Spouse: Jennifer Leigh Wilkerson
- Education: Averett University
- Profession: Farmer
- Committees: Agriculture, Chesapeake and Natural Resources; Counties, Cities and Towns; Militia, Police and Public Safety
- Website: www.friendsofjamesedmunds.com

James Easley Edmunds II (born July 21, 1970) is an American politician. He served in the Virginia House of Delegates from 2010 to 2024, representing the 60th district in Southside Virginia. He is a member of the Republican Party.

== Early life and education ==
Edmunds was born in South Boston, Virginia. He graduated from Halifax County High School in 1988, then received a B.S. degree in business administration from Averett University in 1996.

== Political career ==
Edmunds has been a member of the Virginia House of Delegates since 2010, representing the 60th district in Southside Virginia, including Charlotte, Halifax, and Prince Edward Counties and part of Campbell County.Edmunds has served on the House committees on Agriculture, Chesapeake and Natural Resources; Counties, Cities and Towns; and Militia, Police and Public Safety.

His first legislation was to legalize possession of shed antlers.

He also serves on the Virginia Tobacco Region Revitalization Commission.

=== Electoral history ===
Edmunds was elected to the Halifax County Board of Supervisors from the 5th district in 1999, and became vice chair a year later. He was reelected without opposition in 2003 and 2007.

In 2009, Clarke Hogan, Virginia House of Delegates member from the 60th district, announced he would not run for a fifth term. Edmunds received the Republican nomination and was elected unopposed.

Date	Election	Candidate	Party	Votes	%
Halifax County, Virginia Board of Supervisors, District 5
November 4, 2003	General	James E. Edmunds II		893	99.11
November 4, 2003	General	Write Ins		8	0.89
November 6, 2007	General	James E. Edmunds II		884	95.16
November 6, 2007	General	Write Ins		45	4.84
Virginia House of Delegates, 60th district
November 3, 2009	General	James E. Edmunds II	Republican	10,968	96.10
November 3, 2009	General	Write Ins		445	3.89
November 3, 2009	General	Clarke Hogan retired; seat stayed Republican			
November 8, 2011	General	James E. Edmunds II	Republican	13,201	99.09
November 8, 2011	General	Write Ins		121	0.90
