= James R. Edmunds Jr. =

American architect

James Richard Edmunds Jr.
- Born: April 1, 1890
- Died: February 4, 1953 (aged 62)
- Occupation: Architect
- Buildings: art deco Hutzler's Tower Building at 234 North Howard Street, in Baltimore

James Richard Edmunds Jr. (April 1, 1890 – February 4, 1953) was an American architect.

== Biography ==
He was born on April 1, 1890, in Baltimore, Maryland. He received his education at University of Pennsylvania. He worked with Joseph Evans Sperry and was his partner in 1920. He was a member of the American Institute of Architects in 1923 and also the Royal Institute of British Architects. He served as president of the Baltimore Chapter A.I.A. from 1935 to 1936. He was elected to the A.I.A. College of Fellows in 1937. From 1945 to 1947, he served as national A.I.A. president. Edmunds was a consultant to the American Hospital Association, the U.S. Surgeon General, the National Institute of Health, and Children's Rehabilitation Institute. One of Edmund's significant works was the art deco Hutzler's Tower Building at 234 North Howard Street, in Baltimore.

He died on February 4, 1953.
