= Virginia's 60th House of Delegates district =

Virginia legislative district

District map from the 2023 election

Virginia's 60th House of Delegates district elects one of 100 seats in the Virginia House of Delegates, the lower house of Virginia's bicameral state legislature. Formerly located in Southside Virginia, the district was moved to border northeast of Richmond in 2023, as part of a statewide reorganization of the state's legislative districts.

The seat is currently held by Republican James E. Edmunds II.

== Electoral history ==
=== 2001 ===
Republican Clarke Hogan was elected to represent the 60th district.

=== 2009 ===
Hogan decided not to run for re-election, leaving an empty seat for which Republican James R. Edmunds Jr. was the only candidate on the November ballot.

=== 2017 ===
In the November 2017 election, Edmunds was challenged by Democrat Jamaal Johnston.

=== 2019 ===
Edmunds was re-elected with 66% of the vote, defeating first-time candidate Democrat Janie Zimmerman.
