= 1998 Homestead 2 Hours 15 Minutes =

Track map of Homestead–Miami Speedway

The 1998 Homestead 2 Hours 15 Minutes was the second race for the 1998 United States Road Racing Championship season. It took place on May 17, 1998, at Homestead–Miami Speedway.

== Official results ==
Class winners in bold.

Pos	Class	No	Team	Drivers	Chassis	Tyre	Laps
Pos	Class	No	Team	Drivers	Engine	Tyre	Laps
1	**CA**	**16**	**(United States) Dyson Racing**	**(United States) Butch Leitzinger** **(United Kingdom) James Weaver**	**Riley & Scott Mk III**	**G**	**91**
1	**CA**	**16**	**(United States) Dyson Racing**	**(United States) Butch Leitzinger** **(United Kingdom) James Weaver**	**Ford 5.0L V8**	**G**	**91**
2	CA	30	(Italy) Moretti/Doran Racing	(Italy) Giampiero Moretti (Italy) Mauro Baldi	Ferrari 333 SP	**Y**	91
2	CA	30	(Italy) Moretti/Doran Racing	(Italy) Giampiero Moretti (Italy) Mauro Baldi	Ferrari F310E 4.0L V12	**Y**	91
3	**GT1**	**4**	**(United States) Panoz-Visteon Racing**	**(United Kingdom) Andy Wallace** **(United States) Doc Bundy**	**Panoz GTR-1**	**MI**	**90**
3	**GT1**	**4**	**(United States) Panoz-Visteon Racing**	**(United Kingdom) Andy Wallace** **(United States) Doc Bundy**	**Ford (Roush) 6.0 L V8**	**MI**	**90**
4	GT1	38	(United States) Champion Motors	(Belgium) Thierry Boutsen (France) Pierre-Henri Raphanel	Porsche 911 GT1 Evo	**P**	90
4	GT1	38	(United States) Champion Motors	(Belgium) Thierry Boutsen (France) Pierre-Henri Raphanel	Porsche 3.2 L Turbo Flat-6	**P**	90
5	CA	95	(United States) TRV Motorsport	(United States) Jeret Schroeder (United States) Tom Volk	Kudzu DL-4	**G**	86
5	CA	95	(United States) TRV Motorsport	(United States) Jeret Schroeder (United States) Tom Volk	Chevrolet 6.0 L V8	**G**	86
6	CA	63	(United States) Downing/Atlanta	(United States) Chris Ronson (United States) Jim Downing	Kudzu DLM-4	**G**	85
6	CA	63	(United States) Downing/Atlanta	(United States) Chris Ronson (United States) Jim Downing	Mazda R26B 2.6 L 4-Rotor	**G**	85
7	**GT3**	**1**	**(United States) Prototype Technology Group**	**(Canada) Ross Bentley** **(Belgium) Marc Duez**	**BMW M3**	**Y**	**83**
7	**GT3**	**1**	**(United States) Prototype Technology Group**	**(Canada) Ross Bentley** **(Belgium) Marc Duez**	**BMW 3.2 L I6**	**Y**	**83**
8	GT3	10	(United States) Prototype Technology Group	(United States) Boris Said (United States) Mark Simo	BMW M3	**Y**	83
8	GT3	10	(United States) Prototype Technology Group	(United States) Boris Said (United States) Mark Simo	BMW 3.2 L I6	**Y**	83
9	GT1	74	(United States) Robinson Racing	(United States) George Robinson (United States) Jack Baldwin	Oldsmobile Aurora	**G**	83
9	GT1	74	(United States) Robinson Racing	(United States) George Robinson (United States) Jack Baldwin	NorthStar L47 4.0 L V8	**G**	83
10	CA	28	(United States) Intersport Racing	(United States) Jon Field (United States) Butch Brickell	Riley & Scott Mk III	**G**	83
10	CA	28	(United States) Intersport Racing	(United States) Jon Field (United States) Butch Brickell	Ford 5.0 L V8	**G**	83
11	CA	20	(United States) Dyson Racing	(United States) Dorsey Schroeder (United States) Elliott Forbes-Robinson	Riley & Scott Mk III	**G**	82
11	CA	20	(United States) Dyson Racing	(United States) Dorsey Schroeder (United States) Elliott Forbes-Robinson	Ford 5.0 L V8	**G**	82
12 DNF	CA	88	(United States) Dollahite Racing	(United States) Bill Dollahite (United States) Mike Davies	Ferrari 333 SP	**P**	81
12 DNF	CA	88	(United States) Dollahite Racing	(United States) Bill Dollahite (United States) Mike Davies	Ferrari F310E 4.0L V12	**P**	81
13	GT3	55	(United States) AASCO Performance	(United States) Tim Ralston (Costa Rica) Jorge Trejos	Porsche 911 Carrera RSR	**P**	80
13	GT3	55	(United States) AASCO Performance	(United States) Tim Ralston (Costa Rica) Jorge Trejos	Porsche 3.8 L Flat-6	**P**	80
14	CA	39	(United States) Matthews-Colucci Racing	(United States) David Murry (United States) Jim Matthews	Riley & Scott Mk III	**P**	79
14	CA	39	(United States) Matthews-Colucci Racing	(United States) David Murry (United States) Jim Matthews	Ford 5.0 L V8	**P**	79
15	**GT2**	**54**	**(United States) Bell Motorsports**	**(United Kingdom) Andy Pilgrim** **(United States) Scott Newman** **(United States) Terry Borcheller**	**BMW M3**	**Y**	**79**
15	**GT2**	**54**	**(United States) Bell Motorsports**	**(United Kingdom) Andy Pilgrim** **(United States) Scott Newman** **(United States) Terry Borcheller**	**BMW 3.2 L I6**	**Y**	**79**
16	GT3	07	(United States) G&W Motorsports	(United States) Steve Marshall (United States) Danny Marshall	Porsche 911 GT2	**P**	78
16	GT3	07	(United States) G&W Motorsports	(United States) Steve Marshall (United States) Danny Marshall	Porsche 3.6 L Flat-6	**P**	78
17	GT2	75	(United States) Pettit Racing	(United States) Cameron Worth (United States) Scott Sansone	Mazda RX-7	**HO**	77
17	GT2	75	(United States) Pettit Racing	(United States) Cameron Worth (United States) Scott Sansone	Mazda 2.0 L 3-Rotor	**HO**	77
18	GT2	52	(United States) Team Protosport GT	(United States) Dave Russell (United States) William Stitt	Porsche 911 Carrera RSR	**Y**	77
18	GT2	52	(United States) Team Protosport GT	(United States) Dave Russell (United States) William Stitt	Porsche 3.8 L Flat-6	**Y**	77
19	GT1	2	(United States) Mosler Automotive	(United States) Shane Lewis (United Kingdom) Andy Pilgrim	Mosler Raptor	**P**	56
19	GT1	2	(United States) Mosler Automotive	(United States) Shane Lewis (United Kingdom) Andy Pilgrim	Chevrolet 6.3 L V8	**P**	56
20	GT2	27	(United States) Goldin Brothers Racing	(United States) Steve Goldin (United States) Keith Goldin	Mazda RX-7	**HO**	46
20	GT2	27	(United States) Goldin Brothers Racing	(United States) Steve Goldin (United States) Keith Goldin	Mazda 2.0 L 3-Rotor	**HO**	46
21 DNF	GT2	09	(United States) Spirit of Daytona Racing	(United States) Craig Conway (United States) Todd Flis	Mitsubishi Eclipse GSX	**T**	32
21 DNF	GT2	09	(United States) Spirit of Daytona Racing	(United States) Craig Conway (United States) Todd Flis	Mitsubishi 4G63 2.0 L I4	**T**	32
22 DNF	CA	8	(United States) Transatlantic Racing	(United States) Barry Waddell	Riley & Scott Mk III	**D**	22
22 DNF	CA	8	(United States) Transatlantic Racing	(United States) Barry Waddell	Ford 5.0 L V8	**D**	22
23 DNF	CA	12	(United States) Genesis Racing	(United States) Chuck Goldsborough	Hawk MD3R	**G**	5
23 DNF	CA	12	(United States) Genesis Racing	(United States) Chuck Goldsborough	Chevrolet 6.0 L V8	**G**	5
24 DNF	GT3	93	Team Ecuador	(Ecuador) Henry Taleb	Nissan 240SX	?	4
24 DNF	GT3	93	Team Ecuador	(Ecuador) Henry Taleb	Nissan 3.0 L V6	?	4
25 DNF	GT2	69	(Germany) Spreng Enterprises	(Germany) Gustl Spreng	Porsche 993 Carrera	?	4
25 DNF	GT2	69	(Germany) Spreng Enterprises	(Germany) Gustl Spreng	Porsche 3.6 L Turbo Flat-6	?	4
26 DNF	CA	36	(United States) Matthews-Colucci Racing	(United States) Robby McGehee	Riley & Scott Mk III	**P**	3
26 DNF	CA	36	(United States) Matthews-Colucci Racing	(United States) Robby McGehee	Ford 5.0 L V8	**P**	3
27 DNF	CA	29	(United States) Intersport Racing	(United States) Joaquin DeSoto	Spice SC95	**G**	3
27 DNF	CA	29	(United States) Intersport Racing	(United States) Joaquin DeSoto	Oldsmobile Aurora 4.0 L V8	**G**	3

=== Statistics ===
- Pole Position - #16 Dyson Racing - 1:15.178
- Fastest lap - #16 Dyson Racing - 1:18.851
- Average Speed - 89.09 mph
