= 1998 U.S. Road Racing Classic =

Track map of Mid-Ohio Sports Car Course.

The 1998 U.S. Road Racing Classic was the third race for the 1998 United States Road Racing Championship season. It took place on June 14, 1998, at Mid-Ohio Sports Car Course.

== Official results ==
Class winners in bold.

Pos	Class	No	Team	Drivers	Chassis	Tyre	Laps
Pos	Class	No	Team	Drivers	Engine	Tyre	Laps
1	**CA**	**20**	**(United States) Dyson Racing**	**(United States) Dorsey Schroeder** **(United States) Elliott Forbes-Robinson**	**Riley & Scott Mk III**	**G**	**111**
1	**CA**	**20**	**(United States) Dyson Racing**	**(United States) Dorsey Schroeder** **(United States) Elliott Forbes-Robinson**	**Ford 5.0 L V8**	**G**	**111**
2	CA	16	(United States) Dyson Racing	(United States) Butch Leitzinger (United Kingdom) James Weaver	Riley & Scott Mk III	**G**	111
2	CA	16	(United States) Dyson Racing	(United States) Butch Leitzinger (United Kingdom) James Weaver	Ford 5.0L V8	**G**	111
3	**GT1**	**4**	**(United States) Panoz-Visteon Racing**	**(United Kingdom) Andy Wallace** **(United States) Doc Bundy**	**Panoz GTR-1**	**MI**	**111**
3	**GT1**	**4**	**(United States) Panoz-Visteon Racing**	**(United Kingdom) Andy Wallace** **(United States) Doc Bundy**	**Ford (Roush) 6.0 L V8**	**MI**	**111**
4	GT1	5	(United States) Panoz-Visteon Racing	(Brazil) Raul Boesel (France) Eric Bernard	Panoz GTR-1	**MI**	109
4	GT1	5	(United States) Panoz-Visteon Racing	(Brazil) Raul Boesel (France) Eric Bernard	Ford (Roush) 6.0 L V8	**MI**	109
5	CA	8	(United States) Transatlantic Racing	(United States) Henry Camferdam (United States) Scott Schubot	Riley & Scott Mk III	**D**	107
5	CA	8	(United States) Transatlantic Racing	(United States) Henry Camferdam (United States) Scott Schubot	Ford 5.0 L V8	**D**	107
6	GT1	38	(United States) Champion Motors	(Belgium) Thierry Boutsen (France) Bob Wollek	Porsche 911 GT1 Evo	**P**	106
6	GT1	38	(United States) Champion Motors	(Belgium) Thierry Boutsen (France) Bob Wollek	Porsche 3.2 L Turbo Flat-6	**P**	106
7	CA	28	(United States) Intersport Racing	(United States) Jon Field (United States) John Mirro	Riley & Scott Mk III	**G**	105
7	CA	28	(United States) Intersport Racing	(United States) Jon Field (United States) John Mirro	Ford 5.0 L V8	**G**	105
8	GT1	74	(United States) Robinson Racing	(United States) George Robinson (United States) Jack Baldwin	Oldsmobile Aurora	**G**	104
8	GT1	74	(United States) Robinson Racing	(United States) George Robinson (United States) Jack Baldwin	NorthStar L47 4.0 L V8	**G**	104
9	**GT3**	**10**	**(United States) Prototype Technology Group**	**(United States) Boris Said** **(United States) Bill Auberlen**	**BMW M3**	**Y**	**100**
9	**GT3**	**10**	**(United States) Prototype Technology Group**	**(United States) Boris Said** **(United States) Bill Auberlen**	**BMW 3.2 L I6**	**Y**	**100**
10	**GT2**	**99**	**(United States) Schumacher Racing**	**(United States) Larry Schumacher** **(United Kingdom) Andy Pilgrim**	**Porsche 911 GT2**	**P**	**100**
10	**GT2**	**99**	**(United States) Schumacher Racing**	**(United States) Larry Schumacher** **(United Kingdom) Andy Pilgrim**	**Porsche 3.6 L Turbo Flat-6**	**P**	**100**
11	GT3	1	(United States) Prototype Technology Group	(Canada) Ross Bentley (United States) Mark Simo	BMW M3	**Y**	100
11	GT3	1	(United States) Prototype Technology Group	(Canada) Ross Bentley (United States) Mark Simo	BMW 3.2 L I6	**Y**	100
12	CA	63	(United States) Downing/Atlanta	(United States) Shawn Bayliff (United States) Jim Downing	Kudzu DLM-4	**G**	99
12	CA	63	(United States) Downing/Atlanta	(United States) Shawn Bayliff (United States) Jim Downing	Mazda R26B 2.6 L 4-Rotor	**G**	99
13	GT3	23	(United States) Alex Job Racing	(United States) Cort Wagner (United States) Darryl Havens	Porsche 911 Carrera RSR	**P**	99
13	GT3	23	(United States) Alex Job Racing	(United States) Cort Wagner (United States) Darryl Havens	Porsche 3.8 L Flat-6	**P**	99
14	GT3	07	(United States) G&W Motorsports	(United States) Darren Law (United States) Danny Marshall	Porsche 911 GT2	**P**	98
14	GT3	07	(United States) G&W Motorsports	(United States) Darren Law (United States) Danny Marshall	Porsche 3.6 L Flat-6	**P**	98
15	GT3	86	(United States) G&W Motorsports	(United States) Mike Fitzgerald (United States) Steve Marshall	Porsche 911 GT2	**P**	96
15	GT3	86	(United States) G&W Motorsports	(United States) Mike Fitzgerald (United States) Steve Marshall	Porsche 3.6 L Flat-6	**P**	96
16	GT2	75	(United States) Pettit Racing	(United States) Cameron Worth (United States) Scott Sansone	Mazda RX-7	**HO**	94
16	GT2	75	(United States) Pettit Racing	(United States) Cameron Worth (United States) Scott Sansone	Mazda 2.0 L 3-Rotor	**HO**	94
17	GT3	25	(United States) Alex Job Racing	(United States) Don Kitch (United States) Dale White (United States) Michael Peterson	Porsche 911 Carrera RSR	**P**	93
17	GT3	25	(United States) Alex Job Racing	(United States) Don Kitch (United States) Dale White (United States) Michael Peterson	Porsche 3.8 L Flat-6	**P**	93
18	GT2	52	(United States) Team Protosport GT	(United States) Dave Russell (United States) William Stitt	Porsche 911 Carrera RSR	**Y**	92
18	GT2	52	(United States) Team Protosport GT	(United States) Dave Russell (United States) William Stitt	Porsche 3.8 L Flat-6	**Y**	92
19	GT3	21	(United States) Fabcar/Perfect Power	(United States) Philip Collin (United States) Lee Ezell	Porsche 911 Fabcar	?	83
19	GT3	21	(United States) Fabcar/Perfect Power	(United States) Philip Collin (United States) Lee Ezell	Porsche 3.2 L Flat-6	?	83
20	CA	51	(United States) Brown Racing	(United States) Bobby Brown (United States) Jim Martin	Spice HC94	?	72
20	CA	51	(United States) Brown Racing	(United States) Bobby Brown (United States) Jim Martin	Oldsmobile Aurora 4.0 L V8	?	72
21	CA	95	(United States) TRV Motorsport	(United States) Jeret Schroeder (United States) Tom Volk	Kudzu DL-4	**G**	70
21	CA	95	(United States) TRV Motorsport	(United States) Jeret Schroeder (United States) Tom Volk	Chevrolet 6.0 L V8	**G**	70
22	GT3	81	(United States) Swedish Car Specialist	(United States) Lester Fahlgren (United States) Dick Greer	Mazda RX-7	?	68
22	GT3	81	(United States) Swedish Car Specialist	(United States) Lester Fahlgren (United States) Dick Greer	Mazda 2.0 L 3-Rotor	?	68
23	CA	88	(United States) Dollahite Racing	(United States) Bill Dollahite (United States) Mike Davies	Ferrari 333 SP	**P**	65
23	CA	88	(United States) Dollahite Racing	(United States) Bill Dollahite (United States) Mike Davies	Ferrari F310E 4.0L V12	**P**	65
24 DNF	CA	39	(United States) Matthews-Colucci Racing	(United States) Tom Kendall	Riley & Scott Mk III	**P**	59
24 DNF	CA	39	(United States) Matthews-Colucci Racing	(United States) Tom Kendall	Ford 5.0 L V8	**P**	59
25 DNF	CA	36	(United States) Matthews-Colucci Racing	(United States) Jim Matthews (United States) Barry Waddell	Riley & Scott Mk III	**P**	35
25 DNF	CA	36	(United States) Matthews-Colucci Racing	(United States) Jim Matthews (United States) Barry Waddell	Ford 5.0 L V8	**P**	35
26 DNF	GT1	2	(United States) Mosler Automotive	(United States) Shane Lewis	Mosler Raptor	**P**	22
26 DNF	GT1	2	(United States) Mosler Automotive	(United States) Shane Lewis	Chevrolet 6.3 L V8	**P**	22

=== Statistics ===
- Pole Position - #16 Dyson Racing - 1:18.200
- Fastest lap - #4 Panoz-Visteon Racing - 1:18.019
- Average Speed - 99.367 mph
