= 1998 United States Road Racing Championship =

Seasons
- ← 1968 1999 →

The 1998 United States Road Racing Championship season was the inaugural season of the revived United States Road Racing Championship run by the Sports Car Club of America (SCCA) and also the first North American sports car endurance split era. The season involved four classes: Can-Am prototypes and three Grand Touring classes referred to at GT1, GT2, and GT3. Five races were run from January 31, 1998, to August 23, 1998. Champions were declared on September 2nd after the final round at Laguna Seca was cancelled.

== Schedule ==
Rnd	Race	Distance	Circuit	Location	Date
1	(United States) Rolex 24 at Daytona	24 Hours	Daytona International Speedway	Daytona, Florida	January 31; February 1
2	(United States) USRRC Road Racing Extravaganza	2 Hours 15 Minutes	Homestead-Miami Speedway	Homestead, Florida	May 17
3	(United States) U.S. Road Racing Classic	2 Hours 30 Minutes	Mid-Ohio Sports Car Course	Lexington, Ohio	June 14
4	(United States) Sprint PCS Grand Prix of Minnesota	1 Hour 45 Minutes	Minneapolis street circuit	Minneapolis, Minnesota	June 28
5	(United States) First Union 6 Hours of the Glen	6 Hours	Watkins Glen International	Watkins Glen, New York	August 23
C	(United States) Visa Sports Car Championships	2 Hours 30 Minutes	Laguna Seca Raceway	Monterey, California	October 25

There had been plans to hold a race at Laguna Seca in support of the FIA GT championship, but the race joined the IMSA GT Championship schedule instead.

== Entry list ==
=== Can-Am (CA) ===
Team	Chassis	Engine	Tyre	No.	Drivers	Rnds.
(United States) Scandia Enginnering	Ferrari 333 SP	Ferrari F310E 4.0 L V12	G	3	(France) Yannick Dalmas	1
(United States) Scandia Enginnering	Ferrari 333 SP	Ferrari F310E 4.0 L V12	G	3	(France) Bob Wollek	1
(United States) Scandia Enginnering	Ferrari 333 SP	Ferrari F310E 4.0 L V12	G	3	(Italy) Max Papis	1
(United States) Scandia Enginnering	Ferrari 333 SP	Ferrari F310E 4.0 L V12	G	3	(Canada) Ron Fellows	1
(United States) Transatlantic Racing	Riley & Scott Mk III	Ford 5.0 L V8	D	8	(United States) Scott Schubot	All
(United States) Transatlantic Racing	Riley & Scott Mk III	Ford 5.0 L V8	D	8	(United States) Henry Camferdam	1, 3–5
(United States) Transatlantic Racing	Riley & Scott Mk III	Ford 5.0 L V8	D	8	(United States) Johnny O'Connell	1
(United States) Transatlantic Racing	Riley & Scott Mk III	Ford 5.0 L V8	D	8	(United States) Barry Waddell	2
(United States) Transatlantic Racing	Riley & Scott Mk III	Ford 5.0 L V8	D	8	(Australia) David Besnard	5
(United States) Genesis Racing	Hawk MD3R	Mazda ?? (Rd. 1) Chevrolet 6.0 L V8 (Rd. 2)	G	11 12	(United States) Chuck Goldsborough	1–2
(United States) Genesis Racing	Hawk MD3R	Mazda ?? (Rd. 1) Chevrolet 6.0 L V8 (Rd. 2)	G	11 12	(United States) Rick Fairbanks	1–2
(United States) Genesis Racing	Hawk MD3R	Mazda ?? (Rd. 1) Chevrolet 6.0 L V8 (Rd. 2)	G	11 12	(United Kingdom) Michael DeFontes	1
(United States) Genesis Racing	Hawk MD3R	Mazda ?? (Rd. 1) Chevrolet 6.0 L V8 (Rd. 2)	G	11 12	(United States) Dan Lewis	1
(United States) Genesis Racing	Hawk MD3R	Mazda ?? (Rd. 1) Chevrolet 6.0 L V8 (Rd. 2)	G	11 12	(United States) Mark Neuhaus	1
(Italy) Auto Sport Racing	Ferrari 333 SP	Ferrari F310E 4.0 L V12	?	15	(Switzerland) Enzo Calderari	1*
(Italy) Auto Sport Racing	Ferrari 333 SP	Ferrari F310E 4.0 L V12	?	15	(Switzerland) Lilian Bryner	1*
(United States) Dyson Racing	Riley & Scott Mk III	Ford 5.0 L V8	G	16	(United Kingdom) James Weaver	All
(United States) Dyson Racing	Riley & Scott Mk III	Ford 5.0 L V8	G	16	(United States) Elliott Forbes-Robinson	1
(United States) Dyson Racing	Riley & Scott Mk III	Ford 5.0 L V8	G	16	(United States) Rob Dyson	1
(United States) Dyson Racing	Riley & Scott Mk III	Ford 5.0 L V8	G	16	(United States) Dorsey Schroeder	1
(United States) Dyson Racing	Riley & Scott Mk III	Ford 5.0 L V8	G	16	(United States) Butch Leitzinger	2–5
(United States) Dyson Racing	Riley & Scott Mk III	Ford 5.0 L V8	G	20	(United States) Rob Dyson	1
(United States) Dyson Racing	Riley & Scott Mk III	Ford 5.0 L V8	G	20	(United States) John Paul, Jr.	1
(United States) Dyson Racing	Riley & Scott Mk III	Ford 5.0 L V8	G	20	(United Kingdom) Perry McCarthy	1
(United States) Dyson Racing	Riley & Scott Mk III	Ford 5.0 L V8	G	20	(United States) Butch Leitzinger	1
(United States) Dyson Racing	Riley & Scott Mk III	Ford 5.0 L V8	G	20	(United States) Dorsey Schroeder	2–5
(United States) Dyson Racing	Riley & Scott Mk III	Ford 5.0 L V8	G	20	(United States) Elliott Forbes-Robinson	2–4
(United States) Doyle-Risi Racing	Ferrari 333 SP	Ferrari F310E 4.0 L V12	P	17	(South Africa) Wayne Taylor	1
(United States) Doyle-Risi Racing	Ferrari 333 SP	Ferrari F310E 4.0 L V12	P	17	(Belgium) Eric van de Poele	1
(United States) Doyle-Risi Racing	Ferrari 333 SP	Ferrari F310E 4.0 L V12	P	17	(Spain) Fermín Vélez	1
(United States) Davin Racing	Kudzu DLM	Buick 3.0 L V6	G	19	(United States) A.J. Smith	1
(United States) Davin Racing	Kudzu DLM	Buick 3.0 L V6	G	19	(United States) Mark Montgomery	1
(United States) Davin Racing	Kudzu DLM	Buick 3.0 L V6	G	19	(United States) Edd Davin	1
(United States) Intersport Racing	Riley & Scott Mk III	Ford 5.0 L V8	G	28	(United States) Jon Field	1–3, 5
(United States) Intersport Racing	Riley & Scott Mk III	Ford 5.0 L V8	G	28	(United States) Butch Brickell	1–2
(United States) Intersport Racing	Riley & Scott Mk III	Ford 5.0 L V8	G	28	(United States) Rick Sutherland	1, 5
(United States) Intersport Racing	Riley & Scott Mk III	Ford 5.0 L V8	G	28	(Italy) Enrico Bertaggia	1
(United States) Intersport Racing	Riley & Scott Mk III	Ford 5.0 L V8	G	28	(United States) Alex Padilla	1
(United States) Intersport Racing	Riley & Scott Mk III	Ford 5.0 L V8	G	28	(United States) John Mirro	3
(United States) Intersport Racing	Spice SC95 (1-2) Riley & Scott Mk III (5)	Oldsmobile Aurora 4.0 L V8 (1-2) Ford 5.0 L V8 (5)	G	29 59	(United States) Joaquin DeSoto	1–2
(United States) Intersport Racing	Spice SC95 (1-2) Riley & Scott Mk III (5)	Oldsmobile Aurora 4.0 L V8 (1-2) Ford 5.0 L V8 (5)	G	29 59	(United States) Simon Gregg	1
(United States) Intersport Racing	Spice SC95 (1-2) Riley & Scott Mk III (5)	Oldsmobile Aurora 4.0 L V8 (1-2) Ford 5.0 L V8 (5)	G	29 59	(Germany) Oliver Kuttner	1
(United States) Intersport Racing	Spice SC95 (1-2) Riley & Scott Mk III (5)	Oldsmobile Aurora 4.0 L V8 (1-2) Ford 5.0 L V8 (5)	G	29 59	(United States) Tim Holt	1
(United States) Intersport Racing	Spice SC95 (1-2) Riley & Scott Mk III (5)	Oldsmobile Aurora 4.0 L V8 (1-2) Ford 5.0 L V8 (5)	G	29 59	(United States) John Mirro	2
(United States) Intersport Racing	Spice SC95 (1-2) Riley & Scott Mk III (5)	Oldsmobile Aurora 4.0 L V8 (1-2) Ford 5.0 L V8 (5)	G	29 59	(United States) Jacek Mucha	5
(United States) Intersport Racing	Spice SC95 (1-2) Riley & Scott Mk III (5)	Oldsmobile Aurora 4.0 L V8 (1-2) Ford 5.0 L V8 (5)	G	29 59	(United States) Sam Brown	5
(United States) Doran/Moretti Racing	Ferrari 333 SP	Ferrari F310E 4.0 L V12	Y	30	(Italy) Gianpiero Moretti	1–2, 5
(United States) Doran/Moretti Racing	Ferrari 333 SP	Ferrari F310E 4.0 L V12	Y	30	(Italy) Mauro Baldi	1–2, 5
(United States) Doran/Moretti Racing	Ferrari 333 SP	Ferrari F310E 4.0 L V12	Y	30	(Belgium) Didier Theys	1, 5
(United States) Doran/Moretti Racing	Ferrari 333 SP	Ferrari F310E 4.0 L V12	Y	30	(Netherlands) Arie Luyendyk	1
(United States) Matthews-Colucci Racing	Riley & Scott Mk III	Ford 5.0 L V8	P	36	(United States) Barry Waddell	1, 3, 5
(United States) Matthews-Colucci Racing	Riley & Scott Mk III	Ford 5.0 L V8	P	36	(United States) Jim Pace	1
(United States) Matthews-Colucci Racing	Riley & Scott Mk III	Ford 5.0 L V8	P	36	(Chile) Eliseo Salazar	1
(United States) Matthews-Colucci Racing	Riley & Scott Mk III	Ford 5.0 L V8	P	36	(United States) Jim Matthews	2–3, 5
(United States) Matthews-Colucci Racing	Riley & Scott Mk III	Ford 5.0 L V8	P	36	(United States) Robby McGehee	2
(United States) Matthews-Colucci Racing	Riley & Scott Mk III	Ford 5.0 L V8	P	36	(United States) David Murry	2
(United States) Matthews-Colucci Racing	Riley & Scott Mk III	Ford 5.0 L V8	P	36	(United States) Tom Kendall	5
(United States) Matthews-Colucci Racing	Riley & Scott Mk III	Ford 5.0 L V8	P	39	(United States) David Murry	1–3, 5
(United States) Matthews-Colucci Racing	Riley & Scott Mk III	Ford 5.0 L V8	P	39	(United States) Jim Matthews	1–2
(United States) Matthews-Colucci Racing	Riley & Scott Mk III	Ford 5.0 L V8	P	39	(United States) Hurley Haywood	1, 5
(United States) Matthews-Colucci Racing	Riley & Scott Mk III	Ford 5.0 L V8	P	39	(United Kingdom) Derek Bell	1
(United States) Matthews-Colucci Racing	Riley & Scott Mk III	Ford 5.0 L V8	P	39	(United States) Tom Kendall	3
(United States) Matthews-Colucci Racing	Riley & Scott Mk III	Ford 5.0 L V8	P	39	(Sweden) Stefan Johansson	5
(United States) Fantasy Junction-Coys Racing	Cannibal	Chevrolet 6.0 L V8	?	51	(United States) Bruce Trenery	1
(United States) Fantasy Junction-Coys Racing	Cannibal	Chevrolet 6.0 L V8	?	51	(United States) Spencer Trenery	1
(United States) Fantasy Junction-Coys Racing	Cannibal	Chevrolet 6.0 L V8	?	51	(United Kingdom) Grahame Bryant	1
(United States) Fantasy Junction-Coys Racing	Cannibal	Chevrolet 6.0 L V8	?	51	(United States) Steve Pfeifer	1
(United States) Fantasy Junction-Coys Racing	Cannibal	Chevrolet 6.0 L V8	?	51	(United States) Kent Painter	1
(United States) Brown Racing	Spice HC94	Oldsmobile Aurora 4.0 L V8	?	51	(United States) Bobby Brown	3
(United States) Brown Racing	Spice HC94	Oldsmobile Aurora 4.0 L V8	?	51	(United States) Jim Martin	3
(United States) Kopf Precision Race Products	Keiler KII	Ford 5.0 L V8	D	60	(United States) Shane Donley	1
(United States) Kopf Precision Race Products	Keiler KII	Ford 5.0 L V8	D	60	(United States) Kris Wilson	1
(United States) Kopf Precision Race Products	Keiler KII	Ford 5.0 L V8	D	60	(United States) Tim Moser	1
(United States) Downing Atlanta	Kudzu DLM	Mazda 2.0 L 3-Rotor	G	62	(United States) John Mirro	1
(United States) Downing Atlanta	Kudzu DLM	Mazda 2.0 L 3-Rotor	G	62	(United States) Ralph Thomas	1
(United States) Downing Atlanta	Kudzu DLM	Mazda 2.0 L 3-Rotor	G	62	(United States) Douglas Campbell	1
(United States) Downing Atlanta	Kudzu DLM	Mazda 2.0 L 3-Rotor	G	62	(United States) Dennis Spencer	1
(United States) Downing Atlanta	Kudzu DLM	Mazda 2.0 L 3-Rotor	G	62	(United States) Rich Grupp	1
(United States) Downing Atlanta	Kudzu DLM	Mazda 2.0 L 3-Rotor (1) Mazda R26B 2.6 L 4-Rotor (2-5)	G	63	(United States) Jim Downing	1–3, 5
(United States) Downing Atlanta	Kudzu DLM	Mazda 2.0 L 3-Rotor (1) Mazda R26B 2.6 L 4-Rotor (2-5)	G	63	(United States) Howard Katz	1–2, 5
(United States) Downing Atlanta	Kudzu DLM	Mazda 2.0 L 3-Rotor (1) Mazda R26B 2.6 L 4-Rotor (2-5)	G	63	(Japan) Yojiro Terada	1
(United States) Downing Atlanta	Kudzu DLM	Mazda 2.0 L 3-Rotor (1) Mazda R26B 2.6 L 4-Rotor (2-5)	G	63	(United States) John O'Steen	1
(United States) Downing Atlanta	Kudzu DLM	Mazda 2.0 L 3-Rotor (1) Mazda R26B 2.6 L 4-Rotor (2-5)	G	63	(France) Franck Fréon	1
(United States) Downing Atlanta	Kudzu DLM	Mazda 2.0 L 3-Rotor (1) Mazda R26B 2.6 L 4-Rotor (2-5)	G	63	(United States) Shawn Bayliff	3
(United States) Downing Atlanta	Kudzu DLM	Mazda 2.0 L 3-Rotor (1) Mazda R26B 2.6 L 4-Rotor (2-5)	G	63	(United States) Rich Grupp	5
(United States) Dollahite Racing	Spice BDG-02 (Rd. 1) Ferrari 333 SP (Rd. 2-5)	Chevrolet 6.0 L V8 (Rd. 1) Ferrari F310E 4.0 L V12 (Rd. 2-5)	Y	88	(United States) Bill Dollahite	All
(United States) Dollahite Racing	Spice BDG-02 (Rd. 1) Ferrari 333 SP (Rd. 2-5)	Chevrolet 6.0 L V8 (Rd. 1) Ferrari F310E 4.0 L V12 (Rd. 2-5)	Y	88	(United States) Anthony Lazzaro	1
(United States) Dollahite Racing	Spice BDG-02 (Rd. 1) Ferrari 333 SP (Rd. 2-5)	Chevrolet 6.0 L V8 (Rd. 1) Ferrari F310E 4.0 L V12 (Rd. 2-5)	Y	88	(United States) Paul Dallenbach	1
(United States) Dollahite Racing	Spice BDG-02 (Rd. 1) Ferrari 333 SP (Rd. 2-5)	Chevrolet 6.0 L V8 (Rd. 1) Ferrari F310E 4.0 L V12 (Rd. 2-5)	Y	88	(United States) Mike Davies	2–5
(United States) Dollahite Racing	Spice BDG-02 (Rd. 1) Ferrari 333 SP (Rd. 2-5)	Chevrolet 6.0 L V8 (Rd. 1) Ferrari F310E 4.0 L V12 (Rd. 2-5)	Y	88	(Canada) Claude Bourbonnais	5
(United States) Denaba Racing	Kudzu DLM	Buick 4.5L V6	?	92	(United States) A.J. Smith	4–5
(United States) Denaba Racing	Kudzu DLM	Buick 4.5L V6	?	92	(United States) Joaquin DeSoto	4–5
(United States) TRV Motorsport	Kudzu DL-4	Chevrolet 6.0 L V8	G	95	(United States) Jeret Schroeder	All
(United States) TRV Motorsport	Kudzu DL-4	Chevrolet 6.0 L V8	G	95	(United States) Tom Volk	All
(United States) TRV Motorsport	Kudzu DL-4	Chevrolet 6.0 L V8	G	95	(United States) Lyn St. James	1, 5
(United States) TRV Motorsport	Kudzu DL-4	Chevrolet 6.0 L V8	G	95	(United States) Pete Halsmer	1

=== GT1 ===
Team	Chassis	Engine	Tyre	No.	Drivers	Rnds.
(Canada) Multimatic Motorsports	Ford Mustang Cobra GTS1	Ford 4.6 L V8	D	0	(Canada) Scott Maxwell	1
(Canada) Multimatic Motorsports	Ford Mustang Cobra GTS1	Ford 4.6 L V8	D	0	(Canada) Jason Priestley	1
(Canada) Multimatic Motorsports	Ford Mustang Cobra GTS1	Ford 4.6 L V8	D	0	(Canada) David Empringham	1
(France) Larbre Compétition	Porsche 911 GT1	Porsche 9R1 3.2 L Turbo Flat-6	M	00	(France) Christophe Bouchut	1
(France) Larbre Compétition	Porsche 911 GT1	Porsche 9R1 3.2 L Turbo Flat-6	M	00	(France) Patrice Goueslard	1
(France) Larbre Compétition	Porsche 911 GT1	Porsche 9R1 3.2 L Turbo Flat-6	M	00	(Sweden) Carl Rosenblad	1
(France) Larbre Compétition	Porsche 911 GT1	Porsche 9R1 3.2 L Turbo Flat-6	M	00	(Germany) Uwe Alzen	1
(United States) Rohr Motorsport	Porsche 911 GT1 Evo	Porsche 9R1 3.2 L Turbo Flat-6	M	01	(United Kingdom) Allan McNish	1
(United States) Rohr Motorsport	Porsche 911 GT1 Evo	Porsche 9R1 3.2 L Turbo Flat-6	M	01	(United States) Danny Sullivan	1
(United States) Rohr Motorsport	Porsche 911 GT1 Evo	Porsche 9R1 3.2 L Turbo Flat-6	M	01	(Germany) Dirk Müller	1
(United States) Rohr Motorsport	Porsche 911 GT1 Evo	Porsche 9R1 3.2 L Turbo Flat-6	M	01	(Germany) Jörg Müller	1
(United States) Rohr Motorsport	Porsche 911 GT1 Evo	Porsche 9R1 3.2 L Turbo Flat-6	M	01	(Germany) Uwe Alzen	1
(United States) Mosler Automotive	Mosler Raptor	Chevrolet 6.3 L small-block V8	?	2	(United States) Shane Lewis	All
(United States) Mosler Automotive	Mosler Raptor	Chevrolet 6.3 L small-block V8	?	2	(United States) Vic Rice	1, 3–5
(United States) Mosler Automotive	Mosler Raptor	Chevrolet 6.3 L small-block V8	?	2	(United States) Brian Hornkohl	1
(United States) Mosler Automotive	Mosler Raptor	Chevrolet 6.3 L small-block V8	?	2	(United States) Chris Neville	1
(United States) Mosler Automotive	Mosler Raptor	Chevrolet 6.3 L small-block V8	?	2	(United States) Andy Pilgrim	2
(United States) Tom Gloy Racing	Ford Mustang Cobra	Ford V8	?	4	(United States) Mike Borkowski	1
(United States) Tom Gloy Racing	Ford Mustang Cobra	Ford V8	?	4	(Brazil) Tony Kanaan	1
(United States) Tom Gloy Racing	Ford Mustang Cobra	Ford V8	?	4	(United States) Robbie Buhl	1
(United States) Panoz Motorsports (United States) Visteon Panoz Racing Team	Panoz Esperante GTR-1	Ford (Roush) 6.0L V8	M	4 99	(Australia) David Brabham	1, 3, 5
(United States) Panoz Motorsports (United States) Visteon Panoz Racing Team	Panoz Esperante GTR-1	Ford (Roush) 6.0L V8	M	4 99	(France) Éric Bernard	1
(United States) Panoz Motorsports (United States) Visteon Panoz Racing Team	Panoz Esperante GTR-1	Ford (Roush) 6.0L V8	M	4 99	(United Kingdom) Jamie Davies	1
(United States) Panoz Motorsports (United States) Visteon Panoz Racing Team	Panoz Esperante GTR-1	Ford (Roush) 6.0L V8	M	4 99	(United Kingdom) Andy Wallace	2–3, 5
(United States) Panoz Motorsports (United States) Visteon Panoz Racing Team	Panoz Esperante GTR-1	Ford (Roush) 6.0L V8	M	4 99	(United States) Doc Bundy	2, 4
(United States) Panoz Motorsports (United States) Visteon Panoz Racing Team	Panoz Esperante GTR-1	Ford (Roush) 6.0L V8	M	4 99	(United States) Johnny O'Connell	4
(United States) Panoz Motorsports (United States) Visteon Panoz Racing Team	Panoz Esperante GTR-1	Ford (Roush) 6.0L V8	M	5	(Brazil) Raul Boesel	1, 3, 5
(United States) Panoz Motorsports (United States) Visteon Panoz Racing Team	Panoz Esperante GTR-1	Ford (Roush) 6.0L V8	M	5	(United Kingdom) Andy Wallace	1, 5
(United States) Panoz Motorsports (United States) Visteon Panoz Racing Team	Panoz Esperante GTR-1	Ford (Roush) 6.0L V8	M	5	(United States) Scott Pruett	1
(United States) Panoz Motorsports (United States) Visteon Panoz Racing Team	Panoz Esperante GTR-1	Ford (Roush) 6.0L V8	M	5	(United States) Doc Bundy	1
(United States) Panoz Motorsports (United States) Visteon Panoz Racing Team	Panoz Esperante GTR-1	Ford (Roush) 6.0L V8	M	5	(France) Éric Bernard	3, 5
(United States) Overbagh Motor Racing	Chevrolet Camaro	Chevrolet small-block V8	G	29	(Italy) Fabio Rosa	1
(United States) Overbagh Motor Racing	Chevrolet Camaro	Chevrolet small-block V8	G	29	(Italy) Giovanni Viganó	1
(United States) Overbagh Motor Racing	Chevrolet Camaro	Chevrolet small-block V8	G	29	(Italy) Gabrio Rosa	1
(United States) Overbagh Motor Racing	Chevrolet Camaro	Chevrolet small-block V8	G	29	(Italy) Pierangelo Masselli	1
(United States) Overbagh Motor Racing	Chevrolet Camaro	Chevrolet small-block V8	G	29	(United States) C. J. Johnson	1
(United States) McDill Racing	Chevrolet Camaro	Chevrolet small-block V8	Y	35	(Italy) Stefano Bucci	1
(United States) McDill Racing	Chevrolet Camaro	Chevrolet small-block V8	Y	35	(Italy) Mauro Casadei	1
(United States) McDill Racing	Chevrolet Camaro	Chevrolet small-block V8	Y	35	(Italy) Francesco Ciani	1
(United States) McDill Racing	Chevrolet Camaro	Chevrolet small-block V8	Y	35	(Italy) Andrea Garbagnati	1
(United States) Champion Motors	Porsche 911 GT1 Evo	Porsche 9R1 3.2 L Turbo Flat-6	M	38	(Belgium) Thierry Boutsen	All
(United States) Champion Motors	Porsche 911 GT1 Evo	Porsche 9R1 3.2 L Turbo Flat-6	M	38	(Germany) Ralf Kelleners	1, 5
(United States) Champion Motors	Porsche 911 GT1 Evo	Porsche 9R1 3.2 L Turbo Flat-6	M	38	(United States) Andy Pilgrim	1
(United States) Champion Motors	Porsche 911 GT1 Evo	Porsche 9R1 3.2 L Turbo Flat-6	M	38	(France) Pierre-Henri Raphanel	2
(United States) Champion Motors	Porsche 911 GT1 Evo	Porsche 9R1 3.2 L Turbo Flat-6	M	38	(France) Bob Wollek	3–4
(United States) Rankin Racing, Inc.	Chevrolet Camaro	Chevrolet small-block V8	G	40	(United States) David Rankin	1
(United States) Rankin Racing, Inc.	Chevrolet Camaro	Chevrolet small-block V8	G	40	(United States) Hank Scott	1
(United States) Rankin Racing, Inc.	Chevrolet Camaro	Chevrolet small-block V8	G	40	(Canada) Eric Jensen	1
(United States) Rankin Racing, Inc.	Chevrolet Camaro	Chevrolet small-block V8	G	40	(El Salvador) Toto Lassally	1
(United States) Rankin Racing, Inc.	Chevrolet Camaro	Chevrolet small-block V8	G	40	(United States) Nort Northam	1
(United Kingdom) Newcastle United Storm Racing	Lister Storm GTL	Jaguar 7.0 L V12	M	46	(United Kingdom) Julian Bailey	1
(United Kingdom) Newcastle United Storm Racing	Lister Storm GTL	Jaguar 7.0 L V12	M	46	(United Kingdom) Tiff Needell	1
(United Kingdom) Newcastle United Storm Racing	Lister Storm GTL	Jaguar 7.0 L V12	M	46	(New Zealand) Craig Baird	1
(United Kingdom) Newcastle United Storm Racing	Lister Storm GTL	Jaguar 7.0 L V12	M	46	(United Kingdom) Richard Dean	1
(United States) Diablo Racing	Chevrolet Camaro	Chevrolet small-block V8	G	53	(United States) Tom Scheuren	1, 5
(United States) Diablo Racing	Chevrolet Camaro	Chevrolet small-block V8	G	53	(United States) Gerry Green	1, 5
(United States) Diablo Racing	Chevrolet Camaro	Chevrolet small-block V8	G	53	(United States) Bobby Jones	1, 5
(United States) Diablo Racing	Chevrolet Camaro	Chevrolet small-block V8	G	53	(United States) Spencer Pumpelly	1
Team Argentina	Oldsmobile Cutlass	Oldsmobile V8	G	56	(Argentina) Gastón Aguirre	1
Team Argentina	Oldsmobile Cutlass	Oldsmobile V8	G	56	(Argentina) Francisco Castillo	1
Team Argentina	Oldsmobile Cutlass	Oldsmobile V8	G	56	(Argentina) Horacio Paolucci	1
Team Argentina	Oldsmobile Cutlass	Oldsmobile V8	G	56	(Argentina) Facundo Gilbicella	1
(United States) Banks Motorsport	Chevrolet Corvette	Chevrolet V8	?	72	(United States) Tim Banks	1
(United States) Banks Motorsport	Chevrolet Corvette	Chevrolet V8	?	72	(United States) Todd Sprinkle	1
(United States) Banks Motorsport	Chevrolet Corvette	Chevrolet V8	?	72	(United States) Kerry Hitt	1
(United States) Robinson Racing	Oldsmobile Aurora GTS-1	Oldsmobile 4.0 L V8	G	74	(United States) George Robinson	1–3
(United States) Robinson Racing	Oldsmobile Aurora GTS-1	Oldsmobile 4.0 L V8	G	74	(United States) Jack Baldwin	1–3
(United States) Robinson Racing	Oldsmobile Aurora GTS-1	Oldsmobile 4.0 L V8	G	74	(United States) Irv Hoerr	1
(United States) Robinson Racing	Oldsmobile Aurora GTS-1	Oldsmobile 4.0 L V8	G	74	(United States) Jon Gooding	1
(United States) John Annis	Chevrolet Camaro	Chevrolet V8	?	87	(United States) John Annis	1
(United States) John Annis	Chevrolet Camaro	Chevrolet V8	?	87	(United States) Lee Hill	1
(United States) John Annis	Chevrolet Camaro	Chevrolet V8	?	87	(United States) Bill Ladoniczki	1
(United States) John Annis	Chevrolet Camaro	Chevrolet V8	?	87	(United States) Steve Ladoniczki	1
(United States) John Annis	Chevrolet Camaro	Chevrolet V8	?	87	(United States) Randy Pobst	1
(United States) Maugeri Motorsports	Chevrolet Camaro	Chevrolet V8	G	89	(United States) Richard Maugeri	1
(United States) Maugeri Motorsports	Chevrolet Camaro	Chevrolet V8	G	89	(United States) Anthony Puleo	1
(United States) Maugeri Motorsports	Chevrolet Camaro	Chevrolet V8	G	89	(United States) Sim Penton	1
(United States) Maugeri Motorsports	Chevrolet Camaro	Chevrolet V8	G	89	(United States) Daniel Urrutia	1
(United States) Rock Valley Racing	Chevrolet Camaro	Chevrolet V8	G	91	(United States) Roger Schramm	5
(United States) Rock Valley Racing	Chevrolet Camaro	Chevrolet V8	G	91	(United States) Stu Hayner	5

=== GT2 ===
Team	Chassis	Engine	Tyre	No.	Drivers	Rnds.
(Canada) C. J. Motorsports	Porsche 993 GT2 R	Porsche M64/82 3.6 L Turbo Flat-6	G	04	(United States) John Morton	1
(Canada) C. J. Motorsports	Porsche 993 GT2 R	Porsche M64/82 3.6 L Turbo Flat-6	G	04	(Canada) John Graham	1
(Canada) C. J. Motorsports	Porsche 993 GT2 R	Porsche M64/82 3.6 L Turbo Flat-6	G	04	(Netherlands) Patrick Huisman	1
(Canada) C. J. Motorsports	Porsche 993 GT2 R	Porsche M64/82 3.6 L Turbo Flat-6	G	04	(Netherlands) Duncan Huisman	1
(Canada) Prova Motorsports	Porsche 993 GT2	Porsche M64/83 3.6 L Turbo Flat-6	D	05	(Netherlands) Cor Euser	1
(Canada) Prova Motorsports	Porsche 993 GT2	Porsche M64/83 3.6 L Turbo Flat-6	D	05	(Japan) Masamitsu Ishihara	1
(Canada) Prova Motorsports	Porsche 993 GT2	Porsche M64/83 3.6 L Turbo Flat-6	D	05	(Japan) Katsunori Iketani	1
(United States) Spirit of Daytona	Mitsubishi Eclipse GSX	Mitsubishi I4	T	09	(United States) Craig Conway	2
(United States) Spirit of Daytona	Mitsubishi Eclipse GSX	Mitsubishi I4	T	09	(United States) Todd Flis	2
(United States) Prototype Technology Group	BMW M3	BMW S50 3.2 L I6	Y	6	(United States) Peter Cunningham	4
(United States) Prototype Technology Group	BMW M3	BMW S50 3.2 L I6	Y	6	(United States) Brian Simo	4
(United States) Commercial Motorsports	Ford Mustang	??	?	14	(Canada) Rick Bye	1*
(United States) Commercial Motorsports	Ford Mustang	??	?	14	(United States) Tim Zock	1*
(United States) Commercial Motorsports	Ford Mustang	??	?	14	(Canada) Paul Kitchener	1*
(United States) Commercial Motorsports	Ford Mustang	??	?	14	(United States) Grady Willingham	1*
(United States) Kevin Jeannette	Porsche 993 Carrera RSR	Porsche M64/20 3.8L Flat-6	?	15	(United States) Jay Cochran	1
(United States) Kevin Jeannette	Porsche 993 Carrera RSR	Porsche M64/20 3.8L Flat-6	?	15	(France) Michel Aouate	1
(Germany) Dener Motorsport Stuttgart Sportscar	Porsche 993 GT2	Porsche M64/83 3.6 L Turbo Flat-6	P	21	(Brazil) André Lara Resende	1
(Germany) Dener Motorsport Stuttgart Sportscar	Porsche 993 GT2	Porsche M64/83 3.6 L Turbo Flat-6	P	21	(Brazil) Régis Schuch	1
(Germany) Dener Motorsport Stuttgart Sportscar	Porsche 993 GT2	Porsche M64/83 3.6 L Turbo Flat-6	P	21	(Brazil) Flávio Trindale	1
(Germany) Dener Motorsport Stuttgart Sportscar	Porsche 993 GT2	Porsche M64/83 3.6 L Turbo Flat-6	P	21	(Brazil) Maurizio Sandro Sala	1
(United States) Goldin Brothers Racing	Mazda RX-7	Mazda 13B 2.0 L 3-Rotor	H	27	(United States) Steve Goldin	2
(United States) Goldin Brothers Racing	Mazda RX-7	Mazda 13B 2.0 L 3-Rotor	H	27	(United States) Keith Goldin	2
(United States) GTR Motorsports	Porsche 968 GTR	Porsche ??	D	37	(United States) Bob Strange	5
(United States) GTR Motorsports	Porsche 968 GTR	Porsche ??	D	37	(United States) Jim Loftis	5
(United States) GTR Motorsports	Porsche 968 GTR	Porsche ??	D	37	(United States) John Finger	5
(United States) Johnson Autosport Racing	Porsche 993 Carrera RSR	Porsche 3.8L Flat-6	D	50	(United States) J. Robert Johnson	1, 4
(United States) Johnson Autosport Racing	Porsche 993 Carrera RSR	Porsche 3.8L Flat-6	D	50	(United States) Tom McGlynn	1, 4
(United States) Johnson Autosport Racing	Porsche 993 Carrera RSR	Porsche 3.8L Flat-6	D	50	(United States) James Oppenheimer	1
(United States) Johnson Autosport Racing	Porsche 993 Carrera RSR	Porsche 3.8L Flat-6	D	50	(United States) George Balbach	1
(United States) Johnson Autosport Racing	Porsche 993 Carrera RSR	Porsche 3.8L Flat-6	D	50	(United States) Erik Johnson	1
(United States) Team Protosport GT	Porsche 993 Carrera RSR	Porsche M64/20 3.8L Flat-6	Y	52	(United States) William Stitt	2–4
(United States) Team Protosport GT	Porsche 993 Carrera RSR	Porsche M64/20 3.8L Flat-6	Y	52	(United States) Dave Russell	2–4
(United States) Bell Motorsports	BMW M3	BMW S50 3.2 L I6	Y	54	(United States) Scott Newman	2
(United States) Bell Motorsports	BMW M3	BMW S50 3.2 L I6	Y	54	(United States) Andy Pilgrim	2
(United States) Bell Motorsports	BMW M3	BMW S50 3.2 L I6	Y	54	(United States) Terry Borcheller	2
(United States) Broadfoot Racing	Porsche 944 Turbo	Porsche ??	G	58	(France) Pascal Dro	1
(United States) Broadfoot Racing	Porsche 944 Turbo	Porsche ??	G	58	(United States) Martin Shuster	1
(United States) Broadfoot Racing	Porsche 944 Turbo	Porsche ??	G	58	(France) Phillipe Lenain	1
(United States) Saleen/Allen RRR Speedlab	Saleen Mustang SR	Ford 5.8 L V8	?	65	(United States) Steve Saleen	1
(United States) Saleen/Allen RRR Speedlab	Saleen Mustang SR	Ford 5.8 L V8	?	65	(United States) Ron Johnson	1
(United States) Saleen/Allen RRR Speedlab	Saleen Mustang SR	Ford 5.8 L V8	?	65	(United Kingdom) Will Hoy	1
(Germany) Proton Competition	Porsche 993 GT2	Porsche M64/81 3.6 L Turbo Flat-6	P	69	(Switzerland) Denis Lay	1
(Germany) Proton Competition	Porsche 993 GT2	Porsche M64/81 3.6 L Turbo Flat-6	P	69	(Germany) Gerd Ruch	1
(Germany) Proton Competition	Porsche 993 GT2	Porsche M64/81 3.6 L Turbo Flat-6	P	69	(United States) William Langhorne	1
(Germany) Proton Competition	Porsche 993 GT2	Porsche M64/81 3.6 L Turbo Flat-6	P	69	(Germany) Gerold Ried	1
(Germany) Spreng Enterprises	Porsche 993 Carrera RSR	Porsche M64/20 3.8L Flat-6	Y	69	(Germany) Gustl Spreng	2
(Germany) Spreng Enterprises	Porsche 993 Carrera RSR	Porsche M64/20 3.8L Flat-6	Y	69	(United States) Ray Mummery	2
(United States) Pettit Racing (United States) Oppenheimer Racing	Mazda RX-7	Mazda 13B 2.0 L 3-Rotor	H	71 75	(United States) Cameron Worth	All
(United States) Pettit Racing (United States) Oppenheimer Racing	Mazda RX-7	Mazda 13B 2.0 L 3-Rotor	H	71 75	(United States) Scott Sansone	All
(United States) Pettit Racing (United States) Oppenheimer Racing	Mazda RX-7	Mazda 13B 2.0 L 3-Rotor	H	71 75	(United States) Nick Vitucci	1
(United States) Pettit Racing (United States) Oppenheimer Racing	Mazda RX-7	Mazda 13B 2.0 L 3-Rotor	H	71 75	(United States) Bill Lester	1
(United States) Pettit Racing (United States) Oppenheimer Racing	Mazda RX-7	Mazda 13B 2.0 L 3-Rotor	H	71 75	(United States) Brian Richards	1
(United States) Mostly Mazda	Mazda RX-7	Mazda 13B 2.0 L 3-Rotor	?	78	(United States) Brian Richards	5
(United States) Mostly Mazda	Mazda RX-7	Mazda 13B 2.0 L 3-Rotor	?	78	(United Kingdom) Michael DeFontes	5
(United Kingdom) Chamberlain Engineering	Dodge Viper GTS-R	Chrysler EWB 8.0 L V10	G	81	(United States) Chris Gleason	1
(United Kingdom) Chamberlain Engineering	Dodge Viper GTS-R	Chrysler EWB 8.0 L V10	G	81	(Australia) Ray Lintott	1
(United Kingdom) Chamberlain Engineering	Dodge Viper GTS-R	Chrysler EWB 8.0 L V10	G	81	(United States) Matt Turner	1
(United Kingdom) Chamberlain Engineering	Dodge Viper GTS-R	Chrysler EWB 8.0 L V10	G	81	(United Kingdom) Ashley Ward	1
(Belgium) AD Sport	Porsche 993 GT2	Porsche M64 3.6 L Turbo Flat-6	G	90	(Belgium) Kris Wauters	1
(Belgium) AD Sport	Porsche 993 GT2	Porsche M64 3.6 L Turbo Flat-6	G	90	(Belgium) Koen Wauters	1
(Belgium) AD Sport	Porsche 993 GT2	Porsche M64 3.6 L Turbo Flat-6	G	90	(Belgium) Franco La Rosa	1
(Belgium) AD Sport	Porsche 993 GT2	Porsche M64 3.6 L Turbo Flat-6	G	90	(Belgium) Bert Longin	1
(Belgium) AD Sport	Porsche 993 GT2	Porsche M64 3.6 L Turbo Flat-6	G	90	(Belgium) Albert Vanierschot	1
(Germany) Konrad Motorsport	Porsche 993 GT2 R	Porsche M64/81 3.6 L Turbo Flat-6	P	97	(Switzerland) Toni Seiler	1
(Germany) Konrad Motorsport	Porsche 993 GT2 R	Porsche M64/81 3.6 L Turbo Flat-6	P	97	(Germany) Wido Rössler	1
(Germany) Konrad Motorsport	Porsche 993 GT2 R	Porsche M64/81 3.6 L Turbo Flat-6	P	97	(United States) Peter Kitchak	1
(Germany) Konrad Motorsport	Porsche 993 GT2 R	Porsche M64/81 3.6 L Turbo Flat-6	P	97	(Italy) Angelo Zadra	1
(Germany) Konrad Motorsport	Porsche 993 GT2 R	Porsche M64/81 3.6 L Turbo Flat-6	P	97	(Austria) Franz Konrad	1
(Germany) Konrad Motorsport	Porsche 993 GT2	Porsche M64 3.6 L Turbo Flat-6	P	98	(Austria) Franz Konrad	1
(Germany) Konrad Motorsport	Porsche 993 GT2	Porsche M64 3.6 L Turbo Flat-6	P	98	(United Kingdom) Robert Nearn	1
(Germany) Konrad Motorsport	Porsche 993 GT2	Porsche M64 3.6 L Turbo Flat-6	P	98	(United States) Nick Ham	1
(Germany) Konrad Motorsport	Porsche 993 GT2	Porsche M64 3.6 L Turbo Flat-6	P	98	(United States) Larry Schumacher	1
(United States) Schumacher Racing	Porsche 993 GT2	Porsche M64 3.6 L Turbo Flat-6	P	99	(United States) Larry Schumacher	3, 5
(United States) Schumacher Racing	Porsche 993 GT2	Porsche M64 3.6 L Turbo Flat-6	P	99	(United States) Andy Pilgrim	3
(United States) Schumacher Racing	Porsche 993 GT2	Porsche M64 3.6 L Turbo Flat-6	P	99	(United States) John O'Steen	5

=== GT3 ===
Team	Chassis	Engine	Tyre	No.	Drivers	Rnds.
(United States) Firefly Racing	Porsche 993 Carrera RSR	Porsche M64 3.8L Flat-6	?	06	(United States) Rick Polk	4
(United States) Firefly Racing	Porsche 993 Carrera RSR	Porsche M64 3.8L Flat-6	?	06	(United States) 'Trip' Goolsby	4
(United States) Firefly Racing	Porsche 993 Carrera RSR	Porsche M64 3.8L Flat-6	?	26	(United States) Erik Johnson	4
(United States) Firefly Racing	Porsche 993 Carrera RSR	Porsche M64 3.8L Flat-6	?	26	(United States) James Oppenheimer	4
(United States) G & W Motorsports	Porsche 993 Carrera RSR	Porsche M64 3.8L Flat-6	P	07	(United States) Danny Marshall	All
(United States) G & W Motorsports	Porsche 993 Carrera RSR	Porsche M64 3.8L Flat-6	P	07	(United States) Price Cobb	1
(United States) G & W Motorsports	Porsche 993 Carrera RSR	Porsche M64 3.8L Flat-6	P	07	(United Kingdom) Peter Chambers	1
(United States) G & W Motorsports	Porsche 993 Carrera RSR	Porsche M64 3.8L Flat-6	P	07	(Germany) Ulrich Gallade	1
(United States) G & W Motorsports	Porsche 993 Carrera RSR	Porsche M64 3.8L Flat-6	P	07	(United Kingdom) Martyn Konig	1
(United States) G & W Motorsports	Porsche 993 Carrera RSR	Porsche M64 3.8L Flat-6	P	07	(United States) Steve Marshall	2
(United States) G & W Motorsports	Porsche 993 Carrera RSR	Porsche M64 3.8L Flat-6	P	07	(United States) Darren Law	3–5
(United States) G & W Motorsports	Porsche 993 Carrera RSR	Porsche M64 3.8L Flat-6	P	86	(United States) Steve Marshall	1, 3–5
(United States) G & W Motorsports	Porsche 993 Carrera RSR	Porsche M64 3.8L Flat-6	P	86	(United Kingdom) Brian Redman	1
(United States) G & W Motorsports	Porsche 993 Carrera RSR	Porsche M64 3.8L Flat-6	P	86	(United States) Arthur Urciuoli	1
(United States) G & W Motorsports	Porsche 993 Carrera RSR	Porsche M64 3.8L Flat-6	P	86	(Sweden) Robert Amren	1
(United States) G & W Motorsports	Porsche 993 Carrera RSR	Porsche M64 3.8L Flat-6	P	86	(United States) Price Cobb	1
(United States) G & W Motorsports	Porsche 993 Carrera RSR	Porsche M64 3.8L Flat-6	P	86	(United States) Mike Fitzgerald	3
(United States) G & W Motorsports	Porsche 993 Carrera RSR	Porsche M64 3.8L Flat-6	P	86	(United States) Cole Scrogham	4
(United States) G & W Motorsports	Porsche 993 Carrera RSR	Porsche M64 3.8L Flat-6	P	86	(Canada) Sylvain Tremblay	5
(United States) Spirit of Daytona	Mitsubishi Eclipse GSX	Mitsubishi I4	T	09	(United States) Craig Conway	1
(United States) Spirit of Daytona	Mitsubishi Eclipse GSX	Mitsubishi I4	T	09	(United States) Eric van Cleef	1
(United States) Spirit of Daytona	Mitsubishi Eclipse GSX	Mitsubishi I4	T	09	(United States) Todd Flis	1
(United States) Prototype Technology Group	BMW M3 (E36)	BMW S50 3.2 L I6	Y	1	(Canada) Ross Bentley	2–3
(United States) Prototype Technology Group	BMW M3 (E36)	BMW S50 3.2 L I6	Y	1	(Belgium) Marc Duez	2
(United States) Prototype Technology Group	BMW M3 (E36)	BMW S50 3.2 L I6	Y	1	(United States) Mark Simo	3
(United States) Prototype Technology Group	BMW M3 (E36)	BMW S50 3.2 L I6	Y	6	(United States) Peter Cunningham	1, 5
(United States) Prototype Technology Group	BMW M3 (E36)	BMW S50 3.2 L I6	Y	6	(United States) Mark Simo	1
(United States) Prototype Technology Group	BMW M3 (E36)	BMW S50 3.2 L I6	Y	6	(Austria) Dieter Quester	1
(United States) Prototype Technology Group	BMW M3 (E36)	BMW S50 3.2 L I6	Y	6	(Canada) Ross Bentley	5
(United States) Prototype Technology Group	BMW M3 (E36)	BMW S50 3.2 L I6	Y	6	(Belgium) Marc Duez	5
(United States) Prototype Technology Group	BMW M3 (E36)	BMW S50 3.2 L I6	Y	7	(Canada) Ross Bentley	1
(United States) Prototype Technology Group	BMW M3 (E36)	BMW S50 3.2 L I6	Y	7	(United States) Les Delano	1
(United States) Prototype Technology Group	BMW M3 (E36)	BMW S50 3.2 L I6	Y	7	(United States) Andy Petery	1
(United States) Prototype Technology Group	BMW M3 (E36)	BMW S50 3.2 L I6	Y	7	(United States) Derek Hill	1
(United States) Prototype Technology Group	BMW M3 (E36)	BMW S50 3.2 L I6	Y	10	(United States) Boris Said	1–3
(United States) Prototype Technology Group	BMW M3 (E36)	BMW S50 3.2 L I6	Y	10	(United States) Bill Auberlen	1, 2, 3
(United States) Prototype Technology Group	BMW M3 (E36)	BMW S50 3.2 L I6	Y	10	(Belgium) Marc Duez	1
(United States) Prototype Technology Group	BMW M3 (E36)	BMW S50 3.2 L I6	Y	10	(United States) Peter Cunningham	1
(United States) Prototype Technology Group	BMW M3 (E36)	BMW S50 3.2 L I6	Y	10	(United States) Mark Simo	2, 4–5
(United States) Prototype Technology Group	BMW M3 (E36)	BMW S50 3.2 L I6	Y	10	(Canada) Ross Bentley	4
(United States) Prototype Technology Group	BMW M3 (E36)	BMW S50 3.2 L I6	Y	10	(United States) Andy Pilgrim	5
(United States) Fabcar/Perfect Power	Porsche 911 Fabcar	Porsche 3.2 L Flat-6	D	21	(United States) Philip Collin	3
(United States) Fabcar/Perfect Power	Porsche 911 Fabcar	Porsche 3.2 L Flat-6	D	21	(United States) Lee Ezell	3
(United States) Alex Job Racing	Porsche 993 Carrera RSR	Porsche M64 3.8L Flat-6	P	22	(United States) Randy Pobst	5
(United States) Alex Job Racing	Porsche 993 Carrera RSR	Porsche M64 3.8L Flat-6	P	22	(United States) Terry Borcheller	5
(United States) Alex Job Racing	Porsche 993 Carrera RSR	Porsche M64 3.8L Flat-6	P	23	(United States) Darryl Havens	1, 3, 5
(United States) Alex Job Racing	Porsche 993 Carrera RSR	Porsche M64 3.8L Flat-6	P	23	(United States) Mike Conte	1
(United States) Alex Job Racing	Porsche 993 Carrera RSR	Porsche M64 3.8L Flat-6	P	23	(Belgium) Bruno Lambert	1
(United States) Alex Job Racing	Porsche 993 Carrera RSR	Porsche M64 3.8L Flat-6	P	23	(United Kingdom) Nick Holt	1
(United States) Alex Job Racing	Porsche 993 Carrera RSR	Porsche M64 3.8L Flat-6	P	23	(United States) Cort Wagner	3, 5
(United States) Alex Job Racing	Porsche 993 Carrera RSR	Porsche M64 3.8L Flat-6	P	23	(United States) Kelly Collins	5
(United States) Alex Job Racing	Porsche 993 Carrera RSR	Porsche M64 3.8L Flat-6	P	24	(United States) Don Kitch	1
(United States) Alex Job Racing	Porsche 993 Carrera RSR	Porsche M64 3.8L Flat-6	P	24	(United States) Byron Sanborn	1
(United States) Alex Job Racing	Porsche 993 Carrera RSR	Porsche M64 3.8L Flat-6	P	24	(Italy) Angelo Cilli	1
(United States) Alex Job Racing	Porsche 993 Carrera RSR	Porsche M64 3.8L Flat-6	P	24	(United States) Kim Wolfkill	1
(United States) Alex Job Racing	Porsche 993 Carrera RSR	Porsche M64 3.8L Flat-6	P	25	(United States) Dale White	5
(United States) Alex Job Racing	Porsche 993 Carrera RSR	Porsche M64 3.8L Flat-6	P	25	(Italy) Angelo Cilli	5
(United States) Alex Job Racing	Porsche 993 Carrera RSR	Porsche M64 3.8L Flat-6	P	25	(United States) 'Trip' Goolsby	5
(Germany) RWS-Brun Motorsport	Porsche 993 Cup	Porsche M64 3.8L Flat-6	M	25	(Austria) Hans-Jörg Hofer	1
(Germany) RWS-Brun Motorsport	Porsche 993 Cup	Porsche M64 3.8L Flat-6	M	25	(Italy) Luca Riccitelli	1
(Germany) RWS-Brun Motorsport	Porsche 993 Cup	Porsche M64 3.8L Flat-6	M	25	(Italy) Raffaele Sangiuolo	1
(Germany) RWS-Brun Motorsport	Porsche 993 Cup	Porsche M64 3.8L Flat-6	M	25	(Germany) Günther Blieninger	1
(United States) Goldin Brothers Racing	Mazda RX-7	Mazda 13B 2.0 L 3-Rotor	H	27	(United States) Steve Goldin	1
(United States) Goldin Brothers Racing	Mazda RX-7	Mazda 13B 2.0 L 3-Rotor	H	27	(United States) Keith Goldin	1
(United States) Goldin Brothers Racing	Mazda RX-7	Mazda 13B 2.0 L 3-Rotor	H	27	(United States) John G. Thomas	1
(United States) Goldin Brothers Racing	Mazda RX-7	Mazda 13B 2.0 L 3-Rotor	H	27	(United States) Todd Vallancourt	1
(United States) Phoenix American Motorsport	Pontiac Firebird Formula	Pontiac ??	H	32	(United States) John Heinricy	1
(United States) Phoenix American Motorsport	Pontiac Firebird Formula	Pontiac ??	H	32	(United States) Stu Hayner	1
(United States) Phoenix American Motorsport	Pontiac Firebird Formula	Pontiac ??	H	32	(United States) Scott Harrington	1
(United States) Phoenix American Motorsport	Pontiac Firebird Formula	Pontiac ??	H	32	(United States) Don Knowles	1
(United States) Phoenix American Motorsport	Pontiac Firebird Formula	Pontiac ??	H	33	(United States) Mike Weinberg	1, 5
(United States) Phoenix American Motorsport	Pontiac Firebird Formula	Pontiac ??	H	33	(United States) Jim Michealian	1, 5
(United States) Phoenix American Motorsport	Pontiac Firebird Formula	Pontiac ??	H	33	(United States) Steve McNeely	1, 5
(United States) Phoenix American Motorsport	Pontiac Firebird Formula	Pontiac ??	H	33	(United States) Bob Rockwood	1
(United States) GTR Motorsports	Porsche 968 GTR	Porsche ??	D	37	(United States) Dave White	1
(United States) GTR Motorsports	Porsche 968 GTR	Porsche ??	D	37	(United States) Jim Loftis	1
(United States) GTR Motorsports	Porsche 968 GTR	Porsche ??	D	37	(United States) Bob Strange	1
(United States) GTR Motorsports	Porsche 968 GTR	Porsche ??	D	37	(United States) Richard Howe	1
(United States) Technodyne	Porsche 993 Carrera RSR	Porsche M64 3.8L Flat-6	P	41	(United States) Cort Wagner	1
(United States) Technodyne	Porsche 993 Carrera RSR	Porsche M64 3.8L Flat-6	P	41	(United States) Chris Cervelli	1
(United States) Technodyne	Porsche 993 Carrera RSR	Porsche M64 3.8L Flat-6	P	41	(Germany) Marc Basseng	1
(United States) Technodyne	Porsche 993 Carrera RSR	Porsche M64 3.8L Flat-6	P	41	(United States) Kelly Collins	1
(Belgium) GLPK Racing Leaders	Porsche 993 GT2	Porsche Flat-6	P	44	(Germany) Harald Grohs	1
(Belgium) GLPK Racing Leaders	Porsche 993 GT2	Porsche Flat-6	P	44	(Belgium) Hans Willems	1
(Belgium) GLPK Racing Leaders	Porsche 993 GT2	Porsche Flat-6	P	44	(Belgium) Vincent Dupont	1
(Belgium) GLPK Racing Leaders	Porsche 993 GT2	Porsche Flat-6	P	44	(Belgium) Alfons Taels	1
(Belgium) GLPK Racing Leaders	Porsche 993 GT2	Porsche Flat-6	P	45	(Belgium) Stéphane Cohen	1
(Belgium) GLPK Racing Leaders	Porsche 993 GT2	Porsche Flat-6	P	45	(Belgium) Paul Kumpen	1
(Belgium) GLPK Racing Leaders	Porsche 993 GT2	Porsche Flat-6	P	45	(Belgium) Marc Schoonbroodt	1
(Belgium) GLPK Racing Leaders	Porsche 993 GT2	Porsche Flat-6	P	45	(Germany) Michael Funke	1
(United States) Team Protosport GT	Porsche 993 Carrera RSR	Porsche M64 3.8L Flat-6	Y	52	(United States) Dave Russell	1
(United States) Team Protosport GT	Porsche 993 Carrera RSR	Porsche M64 3.8L Flat-6	Y	52	(United States) William Stitt	1
(United States) Team Protosport GT	Porsche 993 Carrera RSR	Porsche M64 3.8L Flat-6	Y	52	(United States) Mark Hillstead	1
(United States) Team Protosport GT	Porsche 993 Carrera RSR	Porsche M64 3.8L Flat-6	Y	52	(United States) Paul Arnold	1
(United States) Team Protosport GT	Porsche 993 Carrera RSR	Porsche M64 3.8L Flat-6	Y	52	(Germany) Neil Crilly	1
(United States) Bell Motorsports	BMW M3 (E36)	BMW S50 3.2 L I6	Y	54	(United States) Stu Hayner	1
(United States) Bell Motorsports	BMW M3 (E36)	BMW S50 3.2 L I6	Y	54	(Ecuador) Henry Taleb	1
(United States) Bell Motorsports	BMW M3 (E36)	BMW S50 3.2 L I6	Y	54	(United States) Scott Neuman	1
(United States) Bell Motorsports	BMW M3 (E36)	BMW S50 3.2 L I6	Y	54	(United States) Terry Borcheller	1
(United States) AASCO Performance	Porsche 993 Carrera RSR	Porsche M64 3.8L Flat-6	P	55	(United States) Tim Ralston	1–2
(United States) AASCO Performance	Porsche 993 Carrera RSR	Porsche M64 3.8L Flat-6	P	55	(Costa Rica) Jorge Trejos	1–2
(United States) AASCO Performance	Porsche 993 Carrera RSR	Porsche M64 3.8L Flat-6	P	55	(United States) Charles Slater	1
(United States) AASCO Performance	Porsche 993 Carrera RSR	Porsche M64 3.8L Flat-6	P	55	(United States) Tom Peterson	1
(United States) Kryderacing	Nissan 240SX	Nissan 2.4 L I4	G	57	(United States) Reed Kryder	1, 5
(United States) Kryderacing	Nissan 240SX	Nissan 2.4 L I4	G	57	(United States) Steve Ahlgrim	1, 5
(United States) Kryderacing	Nissan 240SX	Nissan 2.4 L I4	G	57	(United States) Dave Deen	1
(United States) Kryderacing	Nissan 240SX	Nissan 2.4 L I4	G	57	(United States) Frank Del Vecchio	1
(United States) Kryderacing	Nissan 240SX	Nissan 2.4 L I4	G	57	(United States) Ryan Hampton	1
(United States) Kryderacing	Nissan 240SX	Nissan 2.4 L I4	G	57	(United States) Alistair Oag	5
(United States) The Racer's Group	Porsche 993 Carrera RSR	Porsche M64 3.8L Flat-6	G	67	(United States) Chris Ronson	1
(United States) The Racer's Group	Porsche 993 Carrera RSR	Porsche M64 3.8L Flat-6	G	67	(United States) Brian Pelke	1
(United States) The Racer's Group	Porsche 993 Carrera RSR	Porsche M64 3.8L Flat-6	G	67	(United States) Steve Pelke	1
(United States) The Racer's Group	Porsche 993 Carrera RSR	Porsche M64 3.8L Flat-6	G	67	(United States) Bruce Busby	1
(United States) The Racer's Group	Porsche 993 Carrera RSR	Porsche M64 3.8L Flat-6	G	68	(United States) Kevin Buckler	1
(United States) The Racer's Group	Porsche 993 Carrera RSR	Porsche M64 3.8L Flat-6	G	68	(United States) Philip Collin	1
(United States) The Racer's Group	Porsche 993 Carrera RSR	Porsche M64 3.8L Flat-6	G	68	(United States) Eric Bretzel	1
(United States) The Racer's Group	Porsche 993 Carrera RSR	Porsche M64 3.8L Flat-6	G	68	(United States) Duncan Dayton	1
(United States) Jack Lewis Enterprises	Porsche 993 Carrera RSR	Porsche M64 3.8L Flat-6	G	73	(United States) Jack Lewis	1
(United States) Jack Lewis Enterprises	Porsche 993 Carrera RSR	Porsche M64 3.8L Flat-6	G	73	(Canada) Tony Burgess	1
(United States) Jack Lewis Enterprises	Porsche 993 Carrera RSR	Porsche M64 3.8L Flat-6	G	73	(United States) Anthony Lazzaro	1
(United States) Jack Lewis Enterprises	Porsche 993 Carrera RSR	Porsche M64 3.8L Flat-6	G	73	(United States) Kurt Mathewson	1
(United States) On the Edge Racing	Porsche 993 Carrera RSR	Porsche M64 3.8L Flat-6	G	75	(United States) Max Schmidt	1
(United States) On the Edge Racing	Porsche 993 Carrera RSR	Porsche M64 3.8L Flat-6	G	75	(United States) Chris Bingham	1
(United States) On the Edge Racing	Porsche 993 Carrera RSR	Porsche M64 3.8L Flat-6	G	75	(United Kingdom) Nigel Smith	1
(United States) On the Edge Racing	Porsche 993 Carrera RSR	Porsche M64 3.8L Flat-6	G	75	(United States) Scott Harrington	1
(United States) Team A.R.E.	Porsche 993 Carrera RSR	Porsche M64 3.8L Flat-6	Y	76	(United States) Scott Peeler	1, 5
(United States) Team A.R.E.	Porsche 993 Carrera RSR	Porsche M64 3.8L Flat-6	Y	76	(United States) Mike Doolin	1
(United States) Team A.R.E.	Porsche 993 Carrera RSR	Porsche M64 3.8L Flat-6	Y	76	(United States) John Ruther	1
(United States) Team A.R.E.	Porsche 993 Carrera RSR	Porsche M64 3.8L Flat-6	Y	76	(United States) Martin Snow	1
(United States) Team A.R.E.	Porsche 993 Carrera RSR	Porsche M64 3.8L Flat-6	Y	76	(United States) Peter Argetsinger	5
(United States) Team A.R.E.	Porsche 993 Carrera RSR	Porsche M64 3.8L Flat-6	Y	76	(United States) Richard Polidori	5
(United States) Grey Cliff Racing	Porsche 993 Carrera RSR	Porsche M64 3.8L Flat-6	?	77	(United States) John Drew	1
(United States) Grey Cliff Racing	Porsche 993 Carrera RSR	Porsche M64 3.8L Flat-6	?	77	(United States) David Friedman	1
(United States) Grey Cliff Racing	Porsche 993 Carrera RSR	Porsche M64 3.8L Flat-6	?	77	(United States) Beran Peter	1
(United States) Grey Cliff Racing	Porsche 993 Carrera RSR	Porsche M64 3.8L Flat-6	?	77	(United States) James Nelson	1
(United States) Grey Cliff Racing	Porsche 993 Carrera RSR	Porsche M64 3.8L Flat-6	?	77	(United States) Mark Greenburg	1
(United States) Swedish Car Specialist	Mazda RX-7	Mazda 13B 2.0 L 3-Rotor	G	81	(United States) Lester Fahlgren	3
(United States) Swedish Car Specialist	Mazda RX-7	Mazda 13B 2.0 L 3-Rotor	G	81	(United States) Dick Greer	3
Team Ecuador	Nissan 240SX	Nissan 2.4 L I4	Y	93	(Ecuador) Henry Taleb	2
Team Ecuador	Nissan 240SX	Nissan 2.4 L I4	Y	93	(Italy) Rino Mastronardi	2
(United States) Olive Garden Racing	Porsche 993 Carrera RSR	Porsche M64 3.8L Flat-6	P	96	(United States) Ron Zitza	1
(United States) Olive Garden Racing	Porsche 993 Carrera RSR	Porsche M64 3.8L Flat-6	P	96	(United States) Kevin Wheeler	1
(United States) Olive Garden Racing	Porsche 993 Carrera RSR	Porsche M64 3.8L Flat-6	P	96	(United States) Mike Davies	1
(United States) North American Marien Group	Porsche 993 Carrera RSR	Porsche M64 3.8L Flat-6	G	98	(United States) Spencer Pumpelly	5
(United States) North American Marien Group	Porsche 993 Carrera RSR	Porsche M64 3.8L Flat-6	G	98	(United States) David Kicak	5
(United States) North American Marien Group	Porsche 993 Carrera RSR	Porsche M64 3.8L Flat-6	G	98	(United States) Oma Kimbrough	5

* Was on the entry list but did not participate in the event.

== Season results ==
Overall winners in bold.

Rnd	Circuit	CA Winning Team	GT1 Winning Team	GT2 Winning Team	GT3 Winning Team	Results
Rnd	Circuit	CA Winning Drivers	GT1 Winning Drivers	GT2 Winning Drivers	GT3 Winning Drivers	Results
1	Daytona	**(United States) #30 Doran/Moretti Racing**	(United States) #01 Rohr Motorsport	(Germany) #97 Konrad Motorsport	(United States) #10 PTG	Results
1	Daytona	(Italy) **Gianpiero Moretti** (Italy) **Mauro Baldi** (Netherlands) **Arie Luyendyk** (Belgium) **Didier Theys**	(United States) Danny Sullivan (United Kingdom) Allan McNish (Germany) Jörg Müller (Germany) Uwe Alzen (Germany) Dirk Müller	(Austria) Franz Konrad (Germany) Wido Rössler (Switzerland) Toni Seiler (Italy) Angelo Zadra (United States) Peter Kitchak	(United States) Bill Auberlen (United States) Boris Said (United States) Peter Cunningham (Belgium) Marc Duez	Results
2	Homestead	**(United States) #16 Dyson Racing**	(United States) #4 Panoz-Visteon Racing	(United States) #54 Bell Motorsports	(United States) #1 PTG	Results
2	Homestead	(United States) **Butch Leitzinger** (United Kingdom) **James Weaver**	(United States) Doc Bundy (United Kingdom) Andy Wallace	(United States) Andy Pilgrim (United States) Terry Borcheller (United States) Scott Newman	(Belgium) Marc Duez (Canada) Ross Bentley	Results
3	Mid-Ohio	**(United States) #20 Dyson Racing**	(United States) #4 Panoz-Visteon Racing	(United States) #99 Schumacher Racing	(United States) #10 PTG	Results
3	Mid-Ohio	(United States) **Dorsey Schroeder** (United States) **Elliott Forbes-Robinson**	(Australia) David Brabham (United Kingdom) Andy Wallace	(United States) Larry Schumacher (United States) Andy Pilgrim	(United States) Bill Auberlen (United States) Boris Said	Results
4	Minneapolis	**(United States) #16 Dyson Racing**	(United States) #4 Panoz-Visteon Racing	(United States) #6 PTG	(United States) #10 PTG	Results
4	Minneapolis	(United States) **Butch Leitzinger** (United Kingdom) **James Weaver**	(United States) Doc Bundy (United States) Johnny O'Connell	(United States) Brian Simo (United States) Peter Cunningham	(United States) Mark Simo (Canada) Ross Bentley	Results
5	Watkins Glen	**(United States) #30 Doran/Moretti Racing**	(United States) #38 Champion Motors	(United States) #25 Alex Job Racing	(United States) #22 Alex Job Racing	Results
5	Watkins Glen	(Italy) **Gianpiero Moretti** (Italy) **Mauro Baldi** (Belgium) **Didier Theys**	(Germany) Ralf Kelleners (Belgium) Thierry Boutsen	(United States) Dale White (United States) "Trip" Goolsby (Italy) Angelo Cilli	(United States) Randy Pobst (United States) Terry Borcheller	Results
