= 1998 Grand Prix of Minneapolis =

American motor vehicle race

The 1998 Grand Prix of Minneapolis (formally known as the Sprint PCS Grand Prix of Minnesota) was the fourth race for the 1998 United States Road Racing Championship season. It took place on June 28, 1998, at the Minneapolis Street Circuit.

== Official results ==
Class winners in bold.

| Pos | Class | No | Team | Drivers | Chassis | Tyre | Laps |
| Pos | Class | No | Team | Drivers | Engine | Tyre | Laps |
|---|---|---|---|---|---|---|---|
| 1 | **CA** | **16** | **(United States) Dyson Racing** | **(United States) Butch Leitzinger** **(United Kingdom) James Weaver** | **Riley & Scott Mk III** | **G** | **80** |
| 1 | **CA** | **16** | **(United States) Dyson Racing** | **(United States) Butch Leitzinger** **(United Kingdom) James Weaver** | **Ford 5.0L V8** | **G** | **80** |
| 2 | CA | 20 | (United States) Dyson Racing | (United States) Dorsey Schroeder (United States) Elliott Forbes-Robinson | Riley & Scott Mk III | **G** | 80 |
| 2 | CA | 20 | (United States) Dyson Racing | (United States) Dorsey Schroeder (United States) Elliott Forbes-Robinson | Ford 5.0 L V8 | **G** | 80 |
| 3 | **GT1** | **4** | **(United States) Panoz-Visteon Racing** | **(United States) Johnny O'Connell** **(United States) Doc Bundy** | **Panoz GTR-1** | **MI** | **80** |
| 3 | **GT1** | **4** | **(United States) Panoz-Visteon Racing** | **(United States) Johnny O'Connell** **(United States) Doc Bundy** | **Ford (Roush) 6.0 L V8** | **MI** | **80** |
| 4 | GT1 | 38 | (United States) Champion Motors | (Belgium) Thierry Boutsen (France) Bob Wollek | Porsche 911 GT1 Evo | **P** | 79 |
| 4 | GT1 | 38 | (United States) Champion Motors | (Belgium) Thierry Boutsen (France) Bob Wollek | Porsche 3.2 L Turbo Flat-6 | **P** | 79 |
| 5 | CA | 8 | (United States) Transatlantic Racing | (United States) Henry Camferdam (United States) Scott Schubot | Riley & Scott Mk III | **D** | 77 |
| 5 | CA | 8 | (United States) Transatlantic Racing | (United States) Henry Camferdam (United States) Scott Schubot | Ford 5.0 L V8 | **D** | 77 |
| 6 | GT1 | 2 | (United States) Mosler Automotive | (United States) Vic Rice (United States) Shane Lewis | Mosler Raptor | **P** | 77 |
| 6 | GT1 | 2 | (United States) Mosler Automotive | (United States) Vic Rice (United States) Shane Lewis | Chevrolet 6.3 L V8 | **P** | 77 |
| 7 | CA | 88 | (United States) Dollahite Racing | (United States) Bill Dollahite (United States) Mike Davies | Ferrari 333 SP | **P** | 76 |
| 7 | CA | 88 | (United States) Dollahite Racing | (United States) Bill Dollahite (United States) Mike Davies | Ferrari F310E 4.0L V12 | **P** | 76 |
| 8 | CA | 95 | (United States) TRV Motorsport | (United States) Jeret Schroeder (United States) Tom Volk | Kudzu DL-4 | **G** | 75 |
| 8 | CA | 95 | (United States) TRV Motorsport | (United States) Jeret Schroeder (United States) Tom Volk | Chevrolet 6.0 L V8 | **G** | 75 |
| 9 | **GT3** | **10** | **(United States) Prototype Technology Group** | **(Canada) Ross Bentley** **(United States) Mark Simo** | **BMW M3** | **Y** | **74** |
| 9 | **GT3** | **10** | **(United States) Prototype Technology Group** | **(Canada) Ross Bentley** **(United States) Mark Simo** | **BMW 3.2 L I6** | **Y** | **74** |
| 10 | **GT2** | **6** | **(United States) Prototype Technology Group** | **(United States) Brian Simo** **(United States) Peter Cunningham** | **BMW M3** | **Y** | **74** |
| 10 | **GT2** | **6** | **(United States) Prototype Technology Group** | **(United States) Brian Simo** **(United States) Peter Cunningham** | **BMW 3.2 L I6** | **Y** | **74** |
| 11 | GT3 | 07 | (United States) G&W Motorsports | (United States) Darren Law (United States) Danny Marshall | Porsche 911 GT2 | **P** | 73 |
| 11 | GT3 | 07 | (United States) G&W Motorsports | (United States) Darren Law (United States) Danny Marshall | Porsche 3.6 L Flat-6 | **P** | 73 |
| 12 | CA | 92 | (United States) Denaba Racing | (United States) A.J. Smith (United States) Joaquin DeSoto | Kudzu DLM | ? | 71 |
| 12 | CA | 92 | (United States) Denaba Racing | (United States) A.J. Smith (United States) Joaquin DeSoto | Buick 4.5 L V6 | ? | 71 |
| 13 | GT2 | 52 | (United States) Team Protosport GT | (United States) Dave Russell (United States) William Stitt | Porsche 911 Carrera RSR | **Y** | 70 |
| 13 | GT2 | 52 | (United States) Team Protosport GT | (United States) Dave Russell (United States) William Stitt | Porsche 3.8 L Flat-6 | **Y** | 70 |
| 14 | GT3 | 86 | (United States) G&W Motorsports | (United States) Cole Scrogham (United States) Steve Marshall | Porsche 911 GT2 | **P** | 70 |
| 14 | GT3 | 86 | (United States) G&W Motorsports | (United States) Cole Scrogham (United States) Steve Marshall | Porsche 3.6 L Flat-6 | **P** | 70 |
| 15 | GT2 | 75 | (United States) Oppenheimer Racing | (United States) Cameron Worth (United States) Scott Sansone | Mazda RX-7 | **HO** | 70 |
| 15 | GT2 | 75 | (United States) Oppenheimer Racing | (United States) Cameron Worth (United States) Scott Sansone | Mazda 2.0 L 3-Rotor | **HO** | 70 |
| 16 | GT3 | 26 | (United States) Firefly Racing | (United States) Erik Johnson (United States) James Oppenheimer | Porsche 911 Carrera RSR | ? | 68 |
| 16 | GT3 | 26 | (United States) Firefly Racing | (United States) Erik Johnson (United States) James Oppenheimer | Porsche 3.8 L Flat-6 | ? | 68 |
| 17 | GT3 | 06 | (United States) Firefly Racing | (United States) 'Trip' Goolsby (United States) Rick Polk | Porsche 911 Carrera RSR | ? | 67 |
| 17 | GT3 | 06 | (United States) Firefly Racing | (United States) 'Trip' Goolsby (United States) Rick Polk | Porsche 3.8 L Flat-6 | ? | 67 |
| 18 | GT2 | 50 | (United States) Johnson Autosport | (United States) Tom McGlynn (United States) Robert Johnson | Porsche 911 Turbo | ? | 64 |
| 18 | GT2 | 50 | (United States) Johnson Autosport | (United States) Tom McGlynn (United States) Robert Johnson | Porsche 3.8 L Turbo Flat-6 | ? | 64 |

=== Statistics ===
- Pole Position - #16 Dyson Racing - 1:15.366
- Fastest lap - #16 Dyson Racing - 1:16.083
- Average Speed - 72.79 mph
