= Homestead–Miami Speedway =

Motorsport track in the United States

- Oval (2003–present)
- Location: 1 Ralph Sanchez Speedway Boulevard; Homestead, Florida, United States 33035
- Coordinates: 25°27′07″N 80°24′31″W
- Capacity: 43,000
- FIA Grade: 3E (Note: Homestead–Miami Speedway has a specific Grade 3 licence for its Formula E layout, named as "Grade 3E".)
- Owner: City of Homestead
- Operator: NASCAR (2019–present); International Speedway Corporation (2001–2019); Miami Motorsports (1995–2001)
- Broke ground: August 24, 1993; 33 years ago
- Opened: November 3, 1995; 30 years ago
- Construction cost: US$59 million
- Former names: Miami-Dade Homestead Motorsports Complex (1995–1998)
- Major events: Current: NASCAR Cup Series; Straight Talk Wireless 400 (1999–2003, 2020–2025); Straight Talk Wireless 400 (2004–2019, 2026); NASCAR O'Reilly Auto Parts Series; Hard Rock Bet 300 (1995–2001, 2020–2025); O'Reilly Auto Parts Series Championship Race (2002–2019, 2026); NASCAR Craftsman Truck Series; Baptist Health 200 (1996–2020, 2022–present); Former: Formula E Miami ePrix (2025); IndyCar Series Grand Prix of Miami (1996–2010); Indy Lights (1996–1999, 2003-2010); Toyota Atlantic Championship (1996–1997, 2000); Rolex Sports Car Series; Grand Prix of Miami (1998, 2000–2012); Ferrari Challenge North America (1996, 1998–2001, 2003, 2006–2012, 2015–2017, 2019, 2021, 2023); FR Americas (2020); Trans-Am Series (1996, 1998, 2014–2018); FIA GT Championship (1998–1999); AMA Superbike Championship (1996, 2012)
- Website: homesteadmiamispeedway.com

Oval (2003–present)
- Length: 1.500 mi (2.414 km)
- Banking: Turns: 18–20° Straights: 4°
- Race lap record: 0:24.682 ( (United States) Sam Hornish Jr., Dallara IR-03, 2004, IndyCar)

Formula E Road Course (2025)
- Length: 2.206 mi (3.551 km)
- Turns: 15
- Race lap record: 1:25.821 ( (Germany) Pascal Wehrlein, Porsche 99X Electric, 2025, F-E)

Modified Road Course (1997–present)
- Length: 2.300 mi (3.701 km)
- Turns: 11
- Race lap record: 1:10.791 ( (United Kingdom) James Weaver, Crawford SSC2K, 2002, LMP900)

Original Road Course (1995–present)
- Length: 2.210 mi (3.556 km)
- Turns: 13
- Race lap record: 1:16.495 ( (Germany) Bernd Schneider, Mercedes-Benz CLK LM, 1998, GT1)

Oval (1997–2002)
- Length: 1.5 mi (2.4 km)
- Banking: Turns: 6° Straights: 3°
- Race lap record: 0:26.825 ( (United Kingdom) Dario Franchitti, Reynard 99I, 1999, CART)

Rectangular Quad-Oval (1995–1996)
- Length: 1.527 mi (2.457 km)
- Turns: 4
- Banking: Turns: 6° Straights: 3°
- Race lap record: 0:28.385 ( (Canada) Greg Moore, Reynard 96I, 1996, CART)

Homestead–Miami Speedway (formerly known as the Homestead Motorsports Complex from 1995 to 1998) is a 1.500 mi (2.414 km) oval-shaped intermediate speedway in Homestead, Florida, United States. It has hosted various major auto racing series throughout its existence, including NASCAR, IndyCar, and FIA GT Championship. The facility has a capacity of 43,000 as of 2019. Along with the main oval track, the facility features a road course layout that uses parts of the oval along with a specially designed infield road course. Homestead–Miami Speedway is owned by the city of Homestead, operated by NASCAR, and led by track president Guillermo Santa Cruz.

Seeking a permanent venue for the Grand Prix of Miami, auto racing promoter Ralph Sanchez initiated plans to build a complex in 1991. After numerous failed proposals, the city of Homestead, recovering from the effects of Hurricane Andrew, was able to woo Sanchez into building the permanent complex within the city and was completed by 1995. In the following four years, the city of Homestead and Sanchez made numerous accommodations to then-NASCAR president Bill France Jr. to gain a NASCAR Cup Series race weekend, including the reconfiguration of the track from a rectangle to an oval-shaped track in 1997. In the 2000s, numerous renovations were made to the track, including a second reconfiguration, the installation of SAFER barriers and lights, and other amenities.

== Description ==
=== Configuration ===
The complex's oval layout in its current form is measured at 1.500 mi (2.414 km), with a progressive system of banking of 18–20° in the turns and 4° of banking on the track's straights. The complex also features a 2.3 mi (3.7 km), 11-turn "roval" layout that uses parts of the oval along with a specially designed infield road course. From 1997–2003, the oval layout featured a banking of 6° in the turns and 3° in the straights.

When the complex was first built, it featured a rectangle-shaped layout similar in shape to the Indianapolis Motor Speedway alongside a 2.210 mi (3.557 km), 13-turn road course layout that utilized parts of the rectangle along with specially designed parts of the track that were contained within the track's infield. The rectangle's layout distance was disputed by sanctioning bodies; NASCAR used a length of 1.510 mi (2.430 km), and Championship Auto Racing Teams (CART) used a length of 1.527 mi (2.457 km).

=== Amenities ===
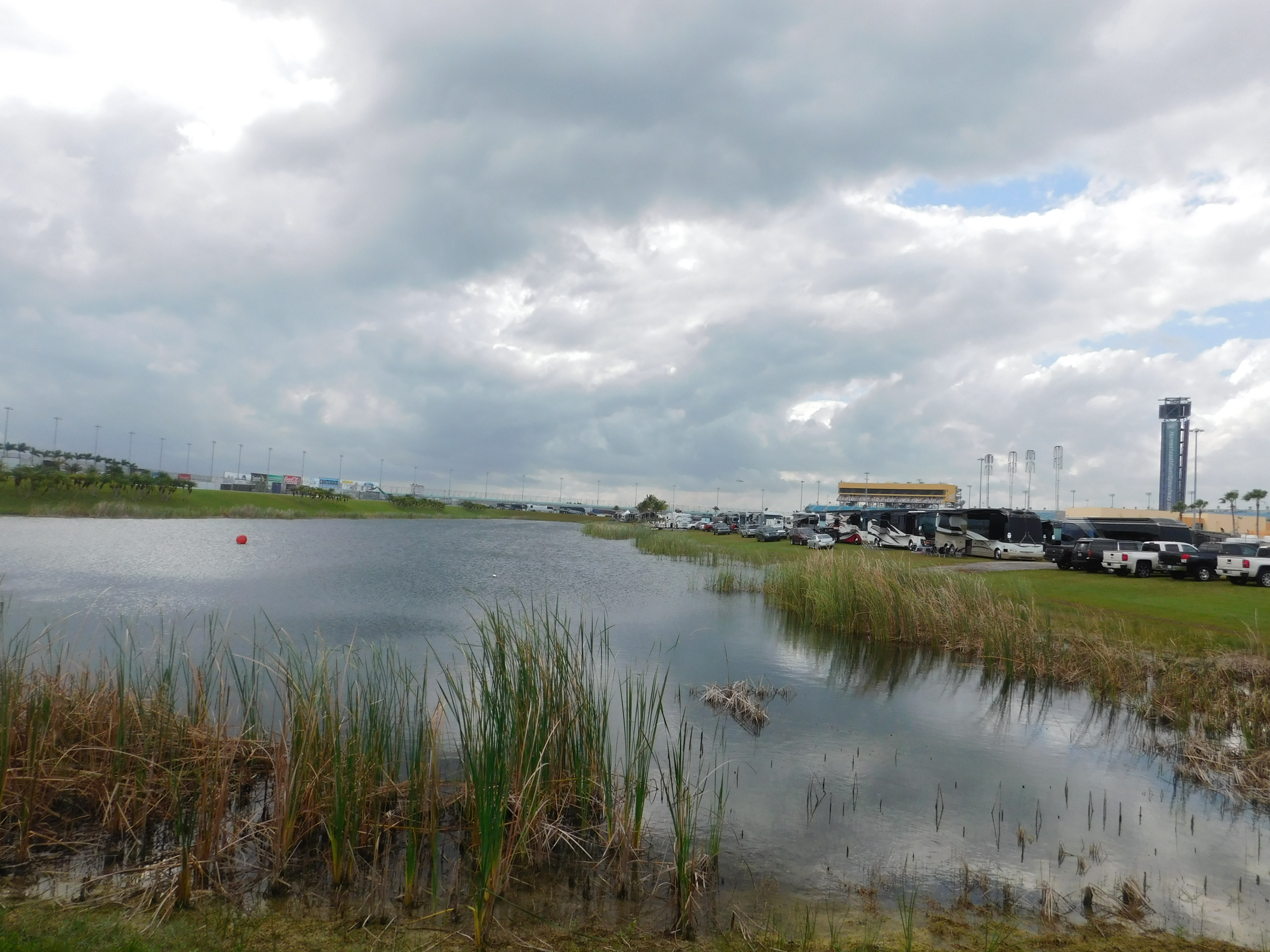
The infield lake at Homestead–Miami Speedway pictured in 2015.

Homestead–Miami Speedway is served by U.S. Route 1 and Florida State Road 821, and covers approximately 650 acres (260 ha) according to the Miami Herald. As of 2019, the facility has a capacity of 43,000 according to Forbes. Within the track's infield is a 90 ft (27 m) deep, 0.5 mi (0.80 km) by 0.125 mi (0.201 km) lake that is occasionally used for fishing tournaments along with a 18,000 square feet (1,700 m^{2}), two-story media center that was constructed in 2008. The facility also features an art deco aesthetic made by Day One that combines "aqua blue, tan, and purple" according to Yahoo Sports' Jay Busbee.

== Track history ==
=== Planning and construction ===
==== Failed Munisport proposal ====
On March 27, 1991, the Miami Herald made public that Grand Prix of Miami promoter Ralph Sanchez sought to build a permanent racing facility in Miami-Dade County, Florida, submitting a bill through the Florida Legislature that proposed that a local tourist tax would expand to let the tax be used to fund motorsports facilities. According to the Herald, he asked for up to $20 million in tax money to build the facility. The bill had passed earlier in the Florida House of Representatives on the 21st. Sanchez wanted to seek out a permanent facility for the Grand Prix of Miami, which had been run as a street course on city streets. Three days after the initial report, the Herald reported that Sanchez was considering a location at Amelia Earhart Park; the plan faced heavy opposition from nearby residents. The bill later passed the Florida Senate in May of that year. In December, Florida legislators voted over a budget proposal of $48.5 million to various sports and events in the Miami area; within the proposal was a plan to give $9 million to Sanchez to build the permanent facility. Sanchez wanted as much as $25 million, but local government leaders cut the amount down. The proposal was approved on the 19th; with the $9 million, Sanchez stated that he aimed to use the money to improve amenities on the street course.

By May 1992, Sanchez began considering a proposal to build a 2.1 mi (3.4 km) racetrack on the Munisport landfill in North Miami, proposing to build the track in two phases. A noise test for nearby residents was conducted the following month, with the proposal receiving mixed, highly polarizing reactions from residents who either supported or opposed the facility. The North Miami City Council approved the proposal on June 26, with Sanchez later stating hopes to host CART IndyCar World Series races. In response, a group of approximately 90 people who opposed the project was formed: the Citizens for the Public Use of Munisport. The group argued that the land was designated to be used as public land according to a referendum voted on by local citizens more than 20 years before the approval. Opposition towards the proposal grew heavily by September, with multiple cities stating their opposition to the project. On October 18, the Herald reported that the Munisport proposal was officially dead, with Sanchez stating to the Herald, "with the opposition mounting in North Miami, we were feeling a little unwanted."

==== Homestead proposal, construction ====
On October 4, in the aftermath of Hurricane Andrew and in midst of the confirmation of the sale of the Villages of Homestead real estate project, Homestead City Manager Alex Muxo stated his hopes to woo Sanchez into building his motorsports complex in Homestead. 11 days later, Muxo stated in a press conference that Sanchez had agreed to build the complex east of the Homestead Sports Complex, with the Metro-Dade Finance Committee promising $11 million for the project. The committee's investment was approved in November, with Sanchez stating that with the approval, "we can start to build almost right away." Another $1.7 million investment was given by the Homestead City Council in February 1993. However, three months later, the project was put into jeopardy when a real estate deal was delayed when Homestead Properties, the owner of approximately 360 acres (150 ha) of prospective land the city of Homestead looked to buy, was sued for alleged misuse of insurance funds. In addition, Sanchez stated in July that "soil conditions and flood criteria requirements" as potential causes for a possible delay.

On July 27, 1993, the Metro-Dade Commission approved the use of $20 million in hotel taxes to invest into the facility, more than half of the budget Sanchez needed for the project; with the approval, Sanchez acquired a total of $20 million for the project. By this point, plans for the facility included 9,000 permanent seats and restaurants. In August, plans for the complex were officially unveiled: the 350-acre (140 ha) complex planned to include two oval tracks and the original road course, with Sanchez hoping to host IndyCar, IMSA, Trans-Am Series, Formula One, and NASCAR races at the facility.

Groundbreaking occurred within the month on the 24th, with NASCAR president Bill France Jr. appearing as a dignitary. Eight days later, construction was halted after numerous environmental groups and agencies pressured Muxo and the city of Homestead to stop clearing land over concerns of a lack of environmental permits. As a result, the $20 million promised by the Metro-Dade Commission was temporarily blocked and the initial announced opening of November 1994 was delayed. On February 24, 1994, Sanchez stated in The Palm Beach Post that he hoped construction would resume the following week; however, new complaints from the Environmental Protection Agency (EPA) and the United States Fish and Wildlife Service arose the following month. In May, construction resumed on the complex after the city of Homestead was able to obtain all the permits needed to resume construction, ending an eight-month delay. Two months later, the projected cost for the project increased by approximately $6 million, leading developers to "temporarily" scale back the project by removing grandstands for the track's first race. The track's first confirmed event was announced in September, with a race weekend highlighted by a NASCAR Busch Series race scheduled to christen the track from November 3–5, 1995.

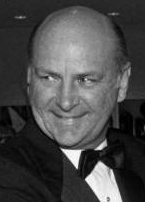
Wayne Huizenga (pictured in the 1980s) offered a $20 million loan to cover the complex's deficits during construction, eventually becoming a minority owner of Miami Motorsports.

Financial troubles continued throughout the end of 1994 and the beginning of 1995. In October, the city of Homestead began to consider selling bonds to finance construction, drafting a sale in December. County oversight was also sought to be greatly increased by November, with the budget for the project approaching $50 million. By April 1995, track developers still owed approximately $11 million to various contractors, with Homestead mayor Ted DeMilly stating in the Miami Herald that "not only don't we have a lot of money, but we have a real time crunch." The following month, businessman Wayne Huizenga offered a $20 million loan to cover the track's remaining deficits in exchange for a minority ownership of the complex. By July, the project's cost increased to an expected $58 million; however, despite the increased costs, the Dade County commission received criticism for not providing bond issues to help fund the track. By the end of the track's initial construction, plans for the track included 65,000 total seats, 70 condominiums, and an oval track layout similar to the layout of the Indianapolis Motor Speedway, with a final projected cost of $59 million (adjusted for inflation, $124,661,498).

=== First years, oval reconfiguration ===
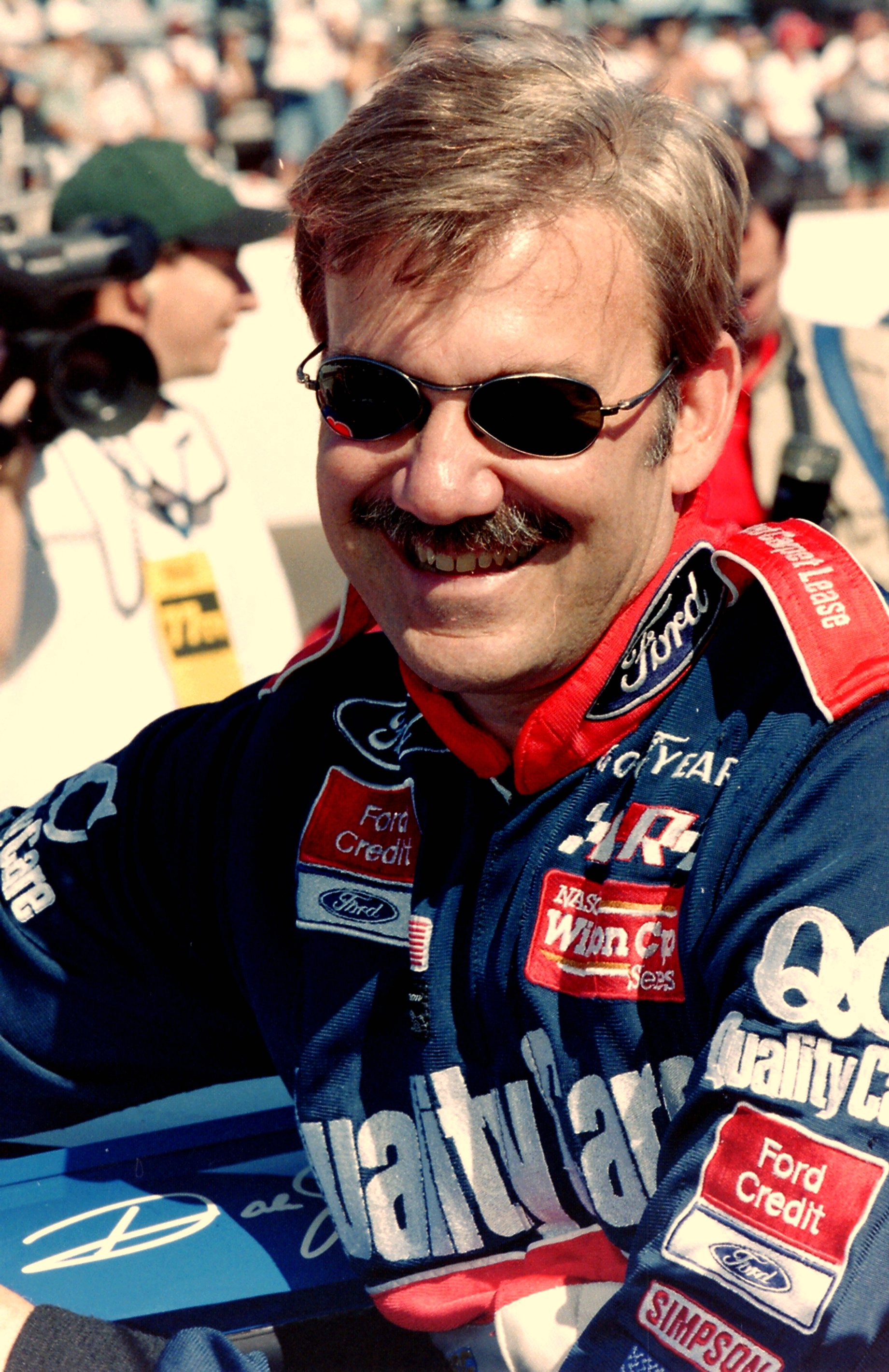
Dale Jarrett (pictured in 1997) won the first major race at the Homestead–Miami Speedway.

The first tire tests on the facility were conducted by Busch Series driver Chad Little on August 9, 1995, with Little praising the track's oval layout. Multi-car tests were run two months later; although consistent praise for the track's oval layout was given, numerous drivers crashed during the session, including one that injured driver Mike Harmon with a fractured left leg. The first race run at the facility on November 4, with Dexter Canipe winning a NASCAR Goody's Dash Series race. The track's first highlight race occurred the following day, with a crowd of 65,000 watching Dale Jarrett win a Busch Series race. After the weekend, the track's surface drew criticism from numerous Busch Series drivers for being too slippery outside of the regular racing line; in response to the criticism, Sanchez pledged to fix the issue by placing down polymer on the track's surface. On March 3, 1996, the complex held its first open-wheel race at the facility, with Jimmy Vasser winning a Championship Auto Racing Teams (CART) event.

After the facility's first CART race weekend, track developers announced the repaving of all four corners due to concerns of a lack of passing, with the corners being widened. The repaving was completed by September of that year; the new track surface drew concerns over the track being too fast for open-wheel racing. After a Busch Series race in November, the track still received criticism by drivers and reporters for a lack of passing. At the same time, Sanchez began initiating plans to obtain a NASCAR Winston Cup Series (now known as the NASCAR Cup Series) date. According to The Tampa Tribune, $17 million worth of renovations were made to the facility in 1996, which focused on adding bathrooms, hospitality centers, and television screens. The following year, Sanchez announced plans in March to reconfigure the rectangle track into an oval-shaped track at a cost of $8 million, with Sanchez stating that if they did not reconfigure the track, "there is no chance we'll get a Winston Cup race." That same month, the facility oversaw its first fatality when NASCAR driver John Nemechek suffered brain injuries from a crash during a NASCAR Truck Series race. Construction on the reconfiguration started on March 24 and was completed by November for the track's annual Busch Series race.

=== Buyout, conflict with city, renovations ===
In further efforts to lure a Winston Cup race, attempts were made to make NASCAR president Bill France Jr. a partner for the Miami Motorsports group that leased the track from the city of Homestead; however, the talks broke down by March 1997. However, by the following month, the city of Homestead voted on changing the lease to allow an option to let the France family purchase Miami Motorsports; it was approved on April 7. By July, talks to convince France Jr. to become a partner of Miami Motorsports resumed, officially announcing on the 23rd that the France family-owned International Speedway Corporation (ISC) and the Roger Penske-owned Penske Motorsports each bought out a 40% share of Miami Motorsports, with Sanchez and Huizenga each retaining 10% ownership. Sanchez stepped down from day-to-day operations in November, with Brian Skuza being appointed as general manager of the track. In March 1998, Sanchez's ownership was bought out, with ISC and Penske Motorsports each increasing their ownership to 45%. In September, Skuza officially announced the confirmation of a Winston Cup Series date for 1999. In order to accommodate a Cup Series race weekend, the facility was upgraded to hold 71,763 permanent seats; an addition of 21,000. In July 1999, the facility underwent a rebranding, with the facility being renamed as the Homestead–Miami Speedway. That same month, ISC bought out Penske Motorsports, with ISC gaining a 90% stake over Miami Motorsports. As part of the move, Skuza was replaced by executive vice president Curtis Gray as president of the track. In September 2001, ISC bought out Huizenga's share of Homestead–Miami Speedway, LLC, taking over full control of the lease.

By 2001, the city of Homestead was reported to have lost $34–51 million on potential profit on the track since 1999 due to the city changing its lease agreements to obtain a Cup Series date, with Miami Herald writer Carl Hiaasen stating that due to the decision to change the city's lease agreement with ISC, "with one baffling stroke of the pen, Homestead agreed that it would take no share of its own speedway's profits, even if the NASCAR races were wildly successful." In response to criticism, Gray stated that the track was not obligated to pay taxes to the city despite a Supreme Court of Florida ruling to end the track's property tax exemption and that the facility was a "viable entity" for the city of Homestead despite the city of Homestead blaming their financial crisis on the track's lease agreement. Gray later stated that critics of the facility and the lease agreement were "misinformed and looking for a scapegoat."

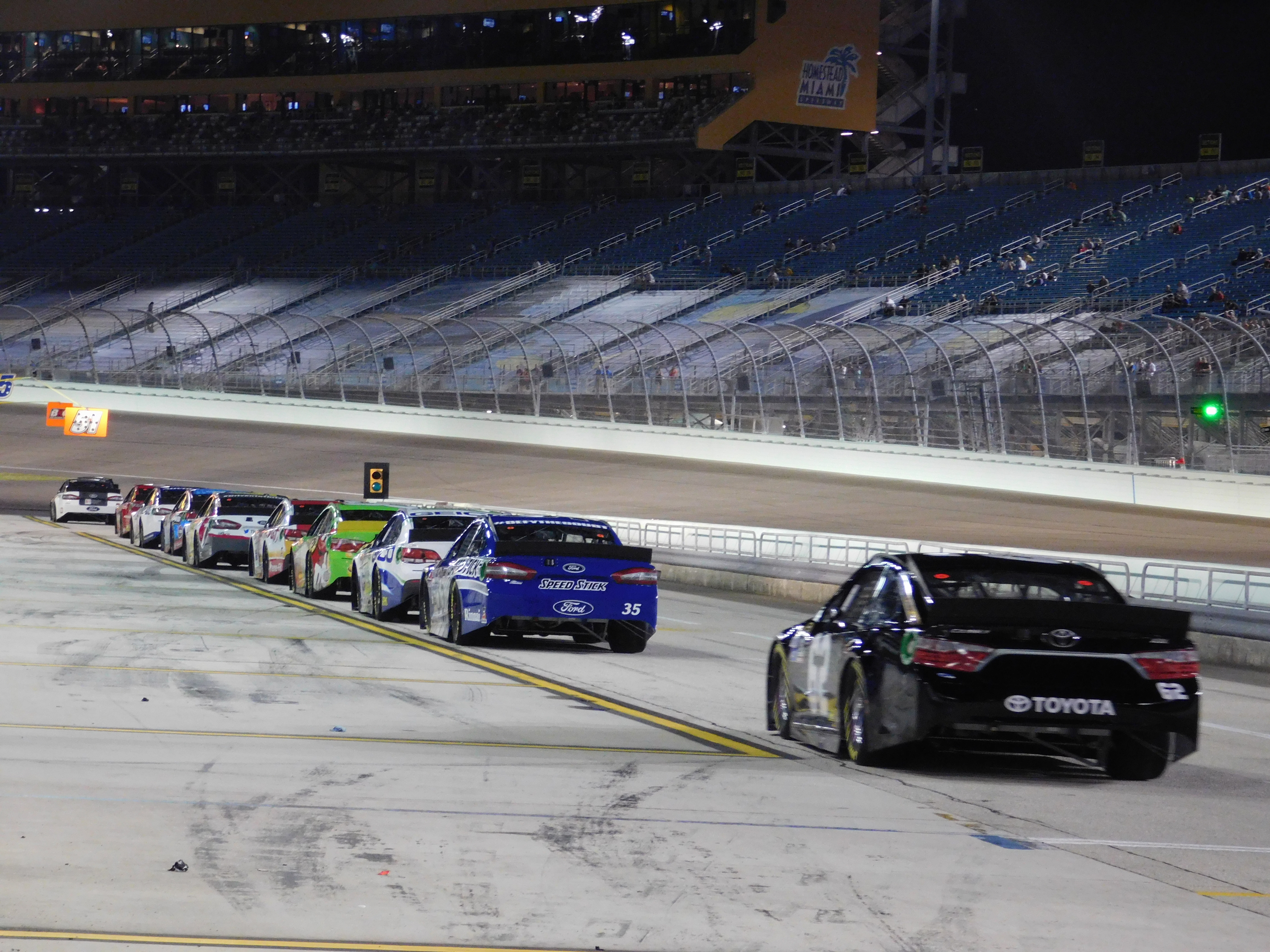
NASCAR cars on pit road during a nighttime qualifying session in 2015. In 2005, the facility installed lights to accommodate racing at nighttime.

In 2002, the facility experienced its second fatality when driver Jeff Clinton was decapitated when he crashed during a practice session for a Grand American Sports Car race. The following year in April, track leaders began considering a reconfiguration to increasing the banking on the track's turns due to complaints from drivers that passing other drivers on the track was too difficult. The $10 million reconfiguration was officially announced the following month, with the track's turns being reconfigured to a variable banking system of 18–20°. Along with the reconfiguration, the addition of soft wall SAFER barriers were announced to increase driver safety. The reconfiguration was completed in time for the 2003 Ford 400 in November and received positive reactions from drivers and NASCAR officials. In 2004, Gray announced his consideration of installing lights to accommodate nighttime racing at the facility. After approval was given by the United States Air Force, the plan was officially confirmed in April 2005 with a budget of approximately $8 million; the project was completed by November. Two months after the announcement, the construction of the $14 million Turn One Tower, a luxury seating section, was announced. In 2006, the track's third fatality occurred when IndyCar driver Paul Dana died in a practice crash for the 2006 Toyota Indy 300. Two years later, track officials announced the construction of a new $8 million media center.

=== Capacity decline, leadership changes ===
In 2009, Gray stepped down from his position as president, with Matthew Becherer being named as Gray's replacement. Two years later, track officials began lobbying for an expansion that would add 12,000 seats and other improvements to the facility. Although the proposal was approved by July of that year, by 2014, the track was reported by ISC to have decreased to 46,000 seats according to Bob Pockrass of Sporting News. By 2019, according to Forbes' Dave Caldwell, the facility decreased its seating capacity to 43,000. That same year, NASCAR bought out ISC in October, taking control of the lease for the track; a month later, Becherer left his position as president, being replaced by senior vice president of operations of Homestead–Miami Speedway, Al Garcia. Garcia retained his position until 2024, when he was replaced by Guillermo Santa Cruz.

== Events ==
=== Racing ===
==== NASCAR ====
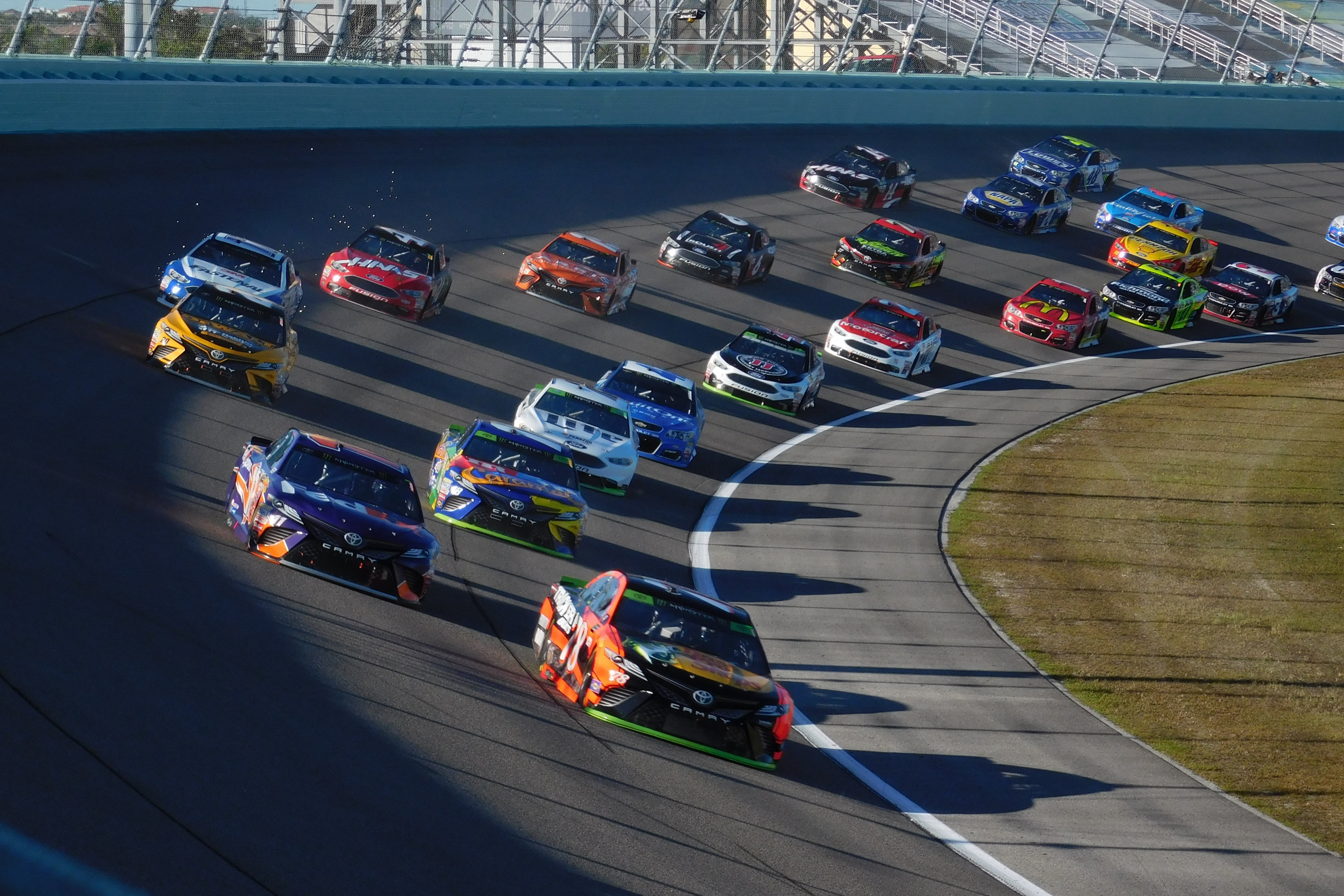
A NASCAR Cup Series race at Homestead–Miami Speedway in 2017.

The track hosts one annual NASCAR weekend, headlined by a NASCAR Cup Series race currently known as the Straight Talk Wireless 400. The event also features support races from the NASCAR O'Reilly Auto Parts Series and NASCAR Craftsman Truck Series, including the Hard Rock Bet 300 and the Baptist Health 200. With the Cup Series being introduced in 1999, the weekend served as the season finale for all three series from 2002 to 2019. In 2020, the finale was moved to NASCAR-owned Phoenix Raceway. However, starting in 2026, the track will again host the season finales for all three series ending a six-year hiatus.

==== Open-wheel racing ====
Starting in 1996, the Grand Prix of Miami was moved from a street course based in Miami to then-named Homestead Motorsports Complex, with Jimmy Vasser winning the first open-wheel event at the facility. Until 2000, the event was sanctioned by Championship Auto Racing Teams (CART); CART failed to renew to 2001, with the Indy Racing League (IRL) taking over sanctioning rights for the event. In 2009, the race moved from being the season opener to the season finale for the IRL. The series failed to renew for the 2011 season, ending a 17-year tenure at the track.

In 2025, Formula E made their debut at the facility for the Miami ePrix, racing on the facility's road course. For the Formula E race, Turn 1 was tightened, and a chicane was added on the backstretch.

==== Other racing events ====
- The Toyota Atlantic Championship raced at the facility in 1996-1997 on the original road course, and in 2000 on the modified road course.
- The Indy Lights series raced at the facility in 1996-1999 and 2003-2010, all on the superspeedway oval.
- The Formula Regional Americas Championship raced at the facility in 2020.
- The FIA GT Championship has made two appearances at the facility, appearing in 1998 and 1999.
- The Trans-Am Series has made occasional appearances since the speedway's inception, with the series last racing at the facility in 2018.

=== Other events and uses ===
- Since 2021, the facility holds an annual Christmas lights drive-thru display that features over one million Christmas lights.

== Layout history ==
Homestead-Miami Speedway Layout History
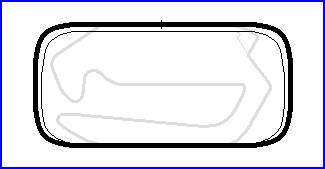
Original Oval (1995–1996)

Speedway (1997–present)

Original Road Course (1995–present)

Modified Road Course (1997–present)

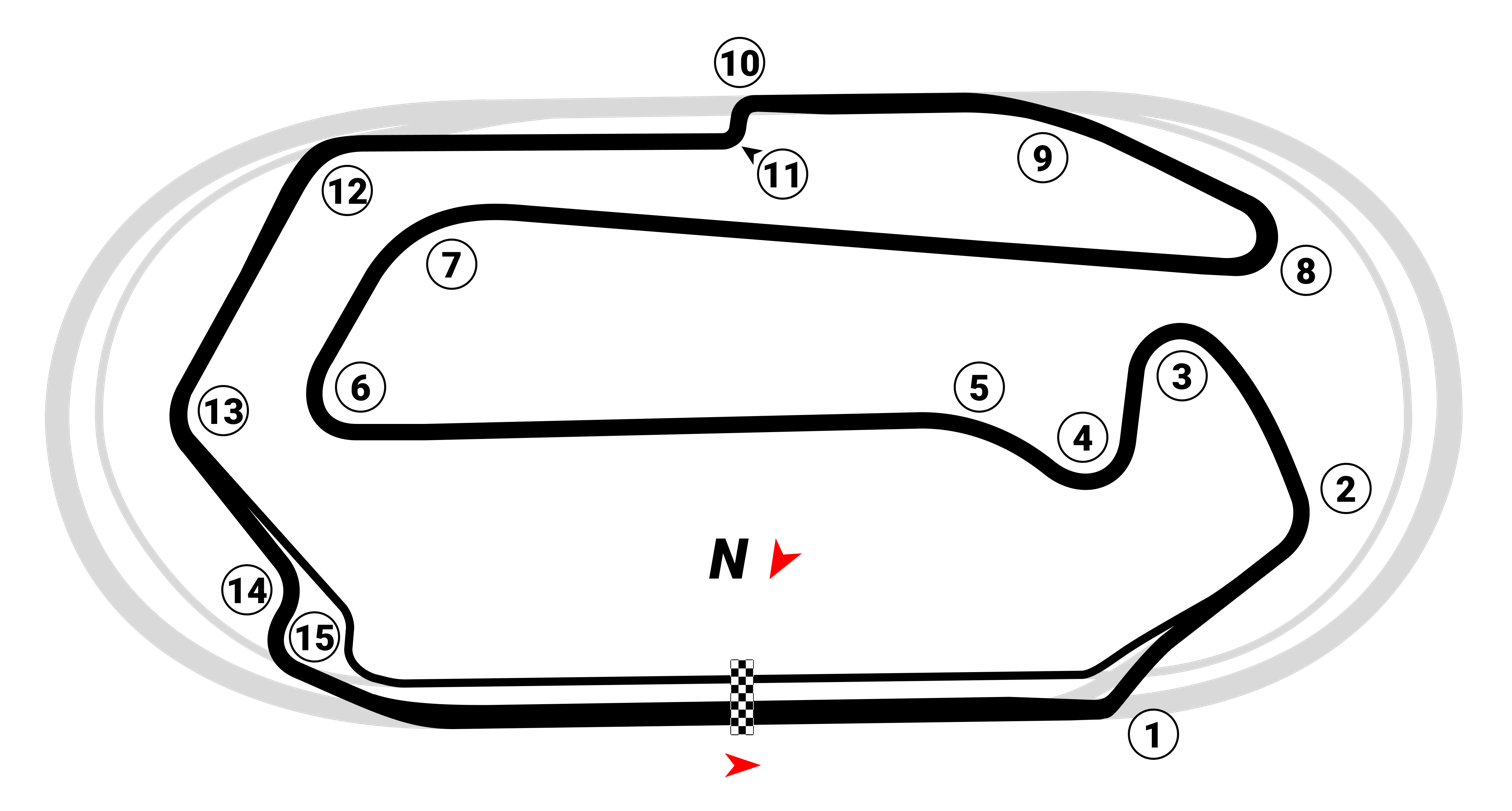
Formula E Road Course (2025)

== Lap records ==
As of February 2026, the fastest official race lap records at Homestead-Miami Speedway are listed as:

Category	Time	Driver	Vehicle	Event
Original Road Course (1995–present): 2.210 mi (3.557 km)
GT1 (Prototype)	1:16.495	Bernd Schneider	Mercedes-Benz CLK LM	1998 FIA GT Homestead 500km
WSC	1:18.851	Butch Leitzinger	Riley & Scott Mk III	1998 Homestead 2 Hours 15 Minutes
Formula Regional	1:22.457	Linus Lundqvist	Ligier JS F3	2020 Homestead FR Americas round
GT2	1:22.597	Karl Wendlinger	Chrysler Viper GTS-R	1999 FIA GT Homestead 3 Hours
Formula Abarth	1:22.828	Antonio Fuoco	Tatuus FA010B	2014 1st Homestead Florida Winter Series round
Superbike	1:23.046	Roger Lee Hayden	Suzuki GSX-R1000	2012 Homestead AMA Pro American Superbike round
Trans-Am	1:24.011	Ron Fellows	Chevrolet Camaro Trans-Am	1996 Homestead Trans-Am round
Barber Pro	1:25.010	Nilton Rossoni	Reynard 98E	1998 Homestead Barber Pro round
Supersport	1:26.066	Jake Gagne	Yamaha YZF-R6	2012 Homestead AMA Pro Daytona Sportbike round
Ferrari Challenge	1:26.540	Cooper MacNeil	Ferrari 488 Challenge Evo	2021 Homestead Ferrari Challenge North America round
Formula 4	1:30.690	Hunter Yeany	Crawford F4-16	2020 Homestead F4 United States round
Modified Road Course (using part of Oval) (1997–present): 2.300 mi (3.701 km)
LMP900	1:10.791	James Weaver	Crawford SSC2K	2002 Nextel 250
DP	1:12.136	Buddy Rice	Coyote CC/09	2009 Gainsco Grand Prix of Miami
LMP675	1:15.804	Brent Sherman	Lola B2K/40	2000 Nextel 250
TA1	1:16.733	Ernie Francis Jr.	Ford Mustang Trans-Am	2018 Homestead Trans-Am round
GT	1:17.039	Steven Ivankovich	Porsche 911 GT3-RS (996)	2002 Nextel 250
GT1 (GTS)	1:17.618	Franz Konrad	Saleen S7-R	2002 Nextel 250
GTO	1:18.584	Terry Borcheller	Saleen Ford Mustang	2000 Nextel 250
American GT	1:18.869	Jack Willes	Chevrolet Corvette	2002 Nextel 250
Formula Abarth	1:19.361	Antonio Fuoco	Tatuus FA010B	2014 2nd Homestead Florida Winter Series round
US F2000	1:19.645	Spencer Pigot	Van Diemen DP08	2011 Homestead US F2000 Winterfest round
Porsche Carrera Cup	1:19.749	Wolf Henzler	Porsche 911 (997) GT3 Cup	2007 Grand Prix of Miami
TA2	1:22.029	Raphael Matos	Chevrolet Camaro Trans-Am	2018 Homestead Trans-Am round
USF Juniors	1:23.3548	Casper Nissen	Tatuus JR-23	2026 Grand Prix of Homestead
Formula 4	1:24.371	Raphael Forcier	Crawford F4-16	2017 Homestead F4 United States round
Oval (2003–present): 1.500 mi (2.414 km)
IndyCar	0:24.6822	Sam Hornish Jr.	Dallara IR-03	2004 Toyota Indy 300
Indy Lights	0:28.4127	Thiago Medeiros	Dallara IPS	2004 Homestead Indy Lights round
NASCAR Cup	0:31.527	Kevin Harvick	Ford Mustang	2019 Ford EcoBoost 400
NASCAR Truck	0:32.480	Justin Haley	Chevrolet Silverado	2018 Ford EcoBoost 200
NASCAR O'Reilly Auto Parts	0:32.593	Cole Custer	Ford Mustang GT	2018 Ford EcoBoost 300
Formula E Road Course (2025): 2.206 mi (3.550 km)
Formula E	1:25.821	Pascal Wehrlein	Porsche 99X Electric	2025 Miami ePrix
Oval (1997–2002): 1.500 mi (2.414 km)
CART	0:26.825	Dario Franchitti	Reynard 99I	1999 Marlboro Grand Prix of Miami
Indy Lights	0:30.271	Shigeaki Hattori	Lola T97/20	1998 Homestead Indy Lights round
Formula Atlantic	0:40.423	Buddy Rice	Swift 008.a	2000 1st Homestead Formula Atlantic round
Barber Pro	0:43.129	Nilton Rossoni	Reynard 98E	2000 Homestead Barber Pro round
Rectangular Quad-Oval (1995–1996): 1.527 mi (2.457 km)
CART	0:28.385	Greg Moore	Reynard 96I	1996 Grand Prix of Miami
Indy Lights	0:32.580	Mark Hotchkis	Lola T93/20	1996 Homestead Indy Lights round
Formula Atlantic	0:41.961	Lee Bentham	Ralt RT41	1996 Homestead Formula Atlantic round
