= Crawford SSC2K =

Prototype race car

- Category: SRP
- Constructor: Crawford
- Designer(s): Andy Scriven

Technical specifications
- Chassis: Carbon fiber and aluminum honeycomb monocoque
- Suspension (front): Double-wishbone, pushrod/rocker design, steering arm with camber and bump steer adjustments, blade adjustable anti-roll bars
- Suspension (rear): Double-wishbone, pushrod/rocker design, blade adjustable anti-roll bars. Geometry options: roll center and anti-squat
- Length: 4,650 mm (183.1 in)
- Width: 2,000 mm (78.7 in)
- Axle track: 1,613 mm (63.5 in) (front); 1,588 mm (62.5 in) (rear)
- Wheelbase: 2,880 mm (113.4 in)
- Engine: Judd GV4 4.0 L (244.1 cu in) 32-valve, DOHC V8, naturally-aspirated, mid-mounted
- Transmission: Crawford-Gemini 6-speed sequential
- Power: > 600 hp (447.4 kW) @ 10,250 rpm (48 mm restrictor); > 350 lb⋅ft (474.5 N⋅m) @ 8500 rpm (48 mm restrictor)
- Weight: 902 kg (1,988.6 lb)
- Tyres: Yokohama

Competition history
- Notable entrants: Doran Racing

The Crawford SSC2K is a purpose-built sports prototype race car, designed, developed and built by American manufacturer Crawford Composites, for the Grand American Road Racing Championship (later Rolex Sports Car Series), between 2001 and 2002.

== Background ==
For the 2001 Grand American Road Racing Championship season Crawford designed and built the Crawford SSC2K. The car was designed by Andy Scriven who joined Crawford in April 1999 after leaving Lola. The GTP sports car was powered by a Judd V10 engine. The car was built for Kevin Doran's racing team, Doran Racing. During the two years the car was contested the car was fitted with various different front end designs. The blunt nose suffered similar issues as experienced by the Reynard 2KQ, the airflow towards the rear end was disrupted. By 2002 Crawford followed Lola B2K/10's example with regard to the aerodynamic design. In the car's second season, the car scored its first win. At Virginia International Raceway Andy Wallace and Chris Dyson won the 500 km race.
