= Ross Bentley =

Canadian racing driver

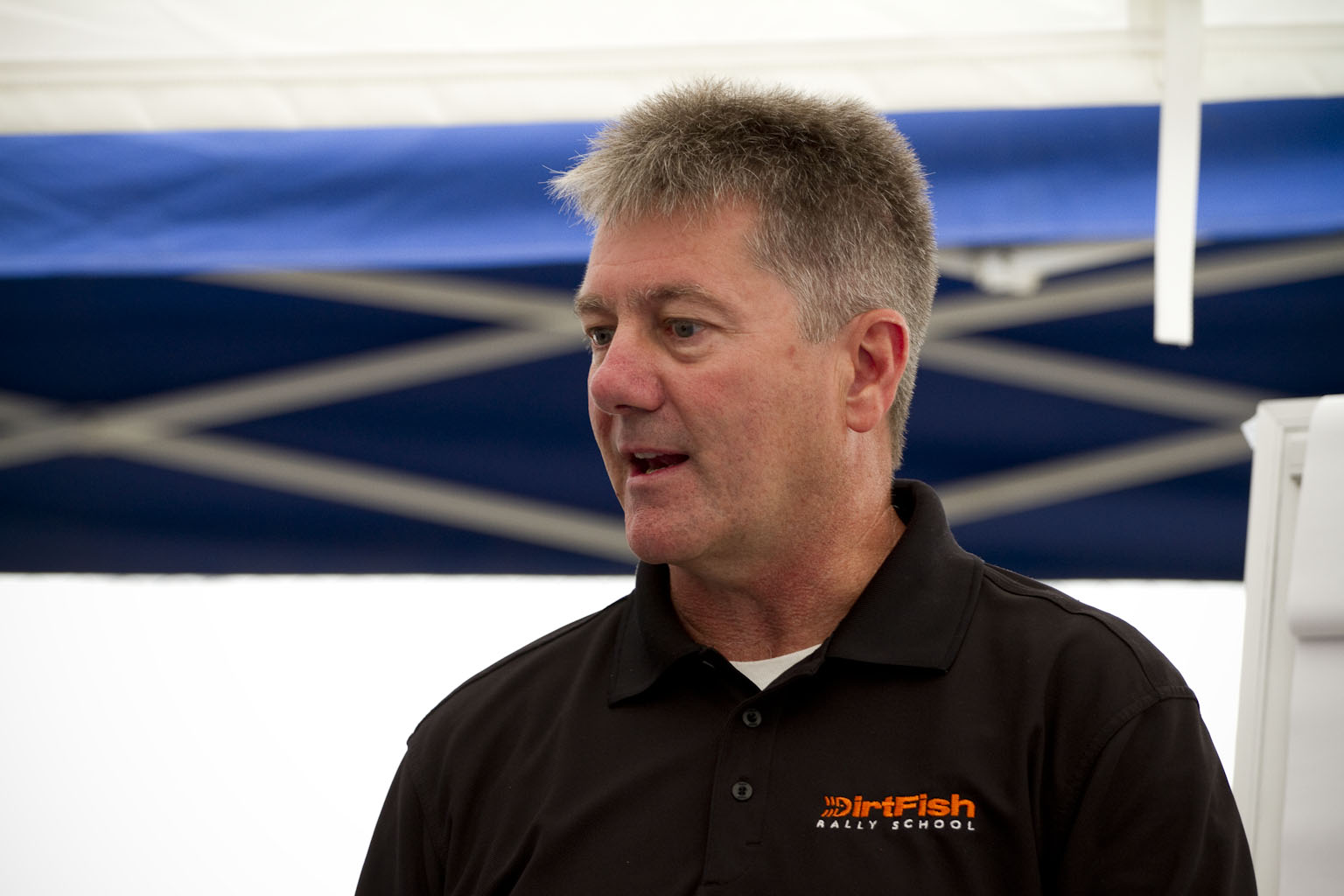
- Bentley with DirtFish Rally School in July 2011
- Nationality: Canadian
- Born: November 4, 1956 (age 70) Vancouver, British Columbia

Rolex Sports Car Series
- Years active: 2000–2005, 2008–2010
- Teams: Prototype Technology Group, Doran Racing, TRV Motorsport, Miracle Motorsports, Park Place Racing, Team Seattle, Essex Racing, The Racers Group, Farnbacher Loles Racing, Bullet Racing
- Starts: 20
- Wins: 1
- Poles: 2
- Best finish: 7th in 2003

Previous series
- 1999, 2002 1998–1999: American Le Mans Series; United States Road Racing Championship

Championship titles
- 1998: United States Road Racing Championship GT3

Champ Car career
- 25 races run over 6 years
- Years active: 1990–1995
- Team(s): Spirit of Vancouver, Dale Coyne Racing
- Best finish: 30th (1992)
- First race: 1990 Molson Indy Vancouver (Vancouver)
- Last race: 1994 Slick 50 200 (Loudon)
Wins	Podiums	Poles
0	0	0

Ross Bentley (born November 4, 1956) is a Canadian performance coach, racing driver, author, and speaker. His performance coaching spans executive/business coaching to sports (athletes and teams in a variety of sports, with a specialty in motorsports).

== Racing career ==
Born in Vancouver, British Columbia, Bentley grew up in a racing household (father was a race mechanic, brother a mechanic and driver) and began driving himself at the age of four. He won 11 amateur racing championships during his early career.

In 1990, Bentley debuted in CART with Spirit of Vancouver, a program that was formed to provide a car for a Vancouverite at the inaugural Molson Indy Vancouver. Bentley returned to the race the following year with Spirit of Vancouver; the effort received support such as pit crew and car from Dale Coyne Racing.

Bentley increased his CART schedule in 1992 with Coyne to include additional races outside of Vancouver, and would run seven races. That year's Vancouver event saw four Canadian drivers including Bentley, who finished 14th while managing a back injury. He continued racing for Coyne in 1993. During the buildup to the Indianapolis 500, Bentley was hospitalized and suffered burns on his hands and neck in a practice crash that caused a fuel regulator to split and pour methanol fuel into the cockpit. Bentley continued driving for Coyne in 1994, when the team brought on Pro Football Hall of Fame running back Walter Payton as a co-owner, but Payton Coyne Racing struggled with performance due to outdated equipment.

A lack of sponsorship forced Bentley out of IndyCar in 1995, prompting him to compete in sports car racing. He competed in the World Sportscar Championship before returning to CART and Payton Coyne at Vancouver, but he failed to make the race after setting the slowest time in qualifying.

Bentley continued his professional career in endurance racing. Bentley won the 1998 United States Road Racing Championship in the GT3 class and the 2003 24 Hours of Daytona in the SRPII Class.

== Off the track ==
Bentley worked as a driving instructor at his Performance Advanced Driving School and a columnist for racing clubs in the 1980s.

Bentley currently owns a consulting business, Bentley Performance Systems, which focuses on improving the performance of individuals, teams and organizations through coaching, workshops and the development of custom-designed programs.

In 1998, Bentley published the first in a series of racing technique and strategy books called Speed Secrets. To date, he has nine books published under the Speed Secrets banner, including Inner Speed Secrets with Ronn Langford and The Complete Driver with Bruce Cleland. He also co-wrote with Bob Bondurant on Race Kart Driving.

In 2017, Bentley released a new title, Performance Pilot (written with professional aviator Phil Wilkes) detailing aviation-specific procedures, techniques, and strategies to help pilots improve their flying performance.

Bentley currently lives with his wife and daughter in Issaquah, Washington, US.

== American open–wheel racing results ==
(key)

=== PPG Indycar Series ===
(key) (Races in bold indicate pole position)

Year	Team	1	2	3	4	5	6	7	8	9	10	11	12	13	14	15	16	17	Rank	Points	Ref
1990	Spirit of Vancouver	PHX	LBH	INDY	MIL	DET	POR	CLE	MEA	TOR	MCH	DEN	VAN; 18	MDO	ROA	NAZ	LAG		**40th**	**0**	
1991	Dale Coyne Racing	SRF	LBH	PHX	INDY	MIL	DET	POR	CLE	MEA	TOR	MCH	DEN	VAN; 13	MDO	ROA	NAZ	LAG	**34th**	**0**	
1992	Dale Coyne Racing	SRF; 11	PHX	LBH	INDY	DET; 20	POR; 17	MIL	NHA	TOR; 14	MCH; 23	CLE; 18	ROA; DNQ	VAN; 14	MDO	NAZ	LAG		**30th**	**2**	
1993	Dale Coyne Racing	SRF; 17	PHX; 12	LBH; 15	INDY; DNQ	MIL; 14	DET; DNQ	POR; 15	CLE; 16	TOR; 25	MCH; 16	NHA	ROA; 17	VAN; 17	MDO; DNQ	NAZ; 22	LAG; DNQ		**32nd**	**1**	
1994	Payton Coyne Racing	SRF	PHX	LBH	INDY; DNQ	MIL; DNQ	DET; DNQ	POR; 22	CLE; 29	TOR; 19	MCH; 19	MDO; DNQ	NHA; 22	VAN; DNQ	ROA; DNS	NAZ; DNQ	LAG; DNQ		**46th**	**0**	
1995	Payton Coyne Racing	MIA	SRF	PHX	LBH	NAZ	INDY	MIL	DET	POR	ROA	TOR	CLE	MCH	MDO	NHA	VAN; DNQ	LAG	NC	-	

== Bibliography ==
- Performance Pilot: Skills, techniques, and strategies to maximize your flying performance, Ross Bentley and Phil Wilkes (2017)
- The Lost Art of High-Performance Driving, Ross Bentley (2017)
- Ultimate Speed Secrets: The Racer's Bible, Ross Bentley (2011)
- Speed Secrets 7: Winning Autocross Techniques, Ross Bentley (2009)
- Speed Secrets 6: The Perfect Driver, Ross Bentley (2007)
- Speed Secrets 5: The Complete Driver, Ross Bentley and Bruce Cleland (2006)
- Speed Secrets 4: Engineering the Driver, Ross Bentley (2005)
- Speed Secrets 3: More Professional Driving Techniques, Ross Bentley (2003)
- Bob Bondurant on Race Kart Driving, Bob Bondurant and Ross Bentley (2002)
- Speed Secrets 2: Inner Speed Secrets: Strategies to Maximize Your Racing Performance, Ross Bentley and Ronn Langford (2000)
- Speed Secrets: Professional Race Driving Techniques, Ross Bentley (1998)

== See also ==
- List of Canadians in Champ Car
