= Spice WSC =

Sports prototype race car

- Category: WSC
- Production: 1994-2000

Technical specifications
- Chassis: carbon fiber/aluminum composite monocoque with carbon fiber-reinforced bodywork
- Suspension: Double wishbones, push-rod actuated coil springs over shock absorbers, anti-roll bar
- Engine: Chevrolet/Ferrari/Oldsmobile 3.4–5.6 L (207.5–341.7 cu in) 90° V8, naturally-aspirated, mid-engined
- Transmission: Hewland VGC 5-speed manual
- Power: 460–700 hp (340–520 kW)

Competition history

The Spice WSC (known under various names, including Spice DR-3, Spice WSC94, Spice HC94, Spice BDG-02, Spice SC95, and the SCI Spice, during its time of development) is a series of sports prototype race cars, designed, developed, and built by various manufacturers, among others the American subsidiary (Spice USA Inc.) of British manufacturer Spice Engineering, to the new World Sports Car regulations, in 1994. It was derived from the Spice SE90C Group C sports car.
