= 1999 United States Road Racing Championship =

Seasons
- ← 1998 2000 (GARRC) →

The 1999 United States Road Racing Championship was the second and final season of the revived United States Road Racing Championship run by the Sports Car Club of America (SCCA). The season involved four classes: Can-Am prototypes and three Grand Touring classes referred to as GT2, GT3, and GTT. Five races were scheduled from January 30, 1999, to October 2, 1999, but the series was cancelled after three rounds on June 6, 1999.

The USRRC season was cancelled due to a lack of competitors, mainly in the premiere Can-Am class. The two cancelled races at the end of the season were to be run in conjunction with the FIA GT Championship, therefore USRRC GT class competitors were allowed to compete in the FIA GT race if they wished, but would not receive points as the champions had already been declared.

The following year, the new Grand American Road Racing Association agreed to take over the series from the SCCA, and renamed it the Grand American Road Racing Championship, eventually becoming the Rolex Sports Car Series.

== Schedule ==
Rnd	Race	Distance	Circuit	Location	Date
1	(United States) Rolex 24 at Daytona	24 Hours	Daytona International Speedway	Daytona, Florida	January 30; January 31
2	(United States) Dodge Dealers Grand Prix	2 Hours 15 Minutes	Lime Rock Park	Lakeville, Connecticut	May 31
3	(United States) U.S. Road Racing Classic	2 Hours 15 Minutes	Mid-Ohio Sports Car Course	Lexington, Ohio	June 6
C	(United States) Sports Car Extravaganza	3 Hours	Homestead-Miami Speedway	Homestead, Florida	September 25
C	(United States) Bosch Sports Car Oktoberfest	6 Hours	Watkins Glen International	Watkins Glen, New York	October 2

Five races were initially scheduled. Lime Rock Park joined the calendar from the IMSA GT series while the Grand Prix of Minnesota was dropped for financial reasons. The events at Lime Rock Park and Mid-Ohio were held in conjunction with the Trans-Am Series while the rounds at Homestead-Miami and Watkins Glen were planned to be joint weekends with the FIA GT championship. After the series was cancelled, GT entries were still allowed to participate in the final two races.

== Entry list ==
=== Can-Am (CA) ===
Team	Chassis	Engine	Tyre	No.	Drivers	Rnds.
(Switzerland) Autosport Racing	Ferrari 333 SP	Ferrari F310E 4.0 L V12	P	00	(Switzerland) Enzo Calderari	1
(Switzerland) Autosport Racing	Ferrari 333 SP	Ferrari F310E 4.0 L V12	P	00	(Italy) Angelo Zadra	1
(Switzerland) Autosport Racing	Ferrari 333 SP	Ferrari F310E 4.0 L V12	P	00	(Switzerland) Lilian Bryner	1
(Switzerland) Autosport Racing	Ferrari 333 SP	Ferrari F310E 4.0 L V12	P	00	(Sweden) Carl Rosenblad	1
(United States) DLW Racing, Inc.	Riley & Scott Mk III	Ford 5.0 L V8	G	3	(United States) Hurley Haywood	1
(United States) DLW Racing, Inc.	Riley & Scott Mk III	Ford 5.0 L V8	G	3	(United States) Don Whittington	1
(United States) DLW Racing, Inc.	Riley & Scott Mk III	Ford 5.0 L V8	G	3	(United States) Dale Whittington	1
(United States) DLW Racing, Inc.	Riley & Scott Mk III	Ford 5.0 L V8	G	3	(United States) Danny Sullivan	1
(United States) Doyle-Risi Racing	Ferrari 333 SP	Ferrari F310E 4.0 L V12	P	7	(United Kingdom) Allan McNish	1
(United States) Doyle-Risi Racing	Ferrari 333 SP	Ferrari F310E 4.0 L V12	P	7	(Belgium) Didier de Radiguès	1
(United States) Doyle-Risi Racing	Ferrari 333 SP	Ferrari F310E 4.0 L V12	P	7	(Italy) Max Angelelli	1
(United States) Doyle-Risi Racing	Ferrari 333 SP	Ferrari F310E 4.0 L V12	P	7	(South Africa) Wayne Taylor	1
(United States) Transatlantic Racing (United States) Supportnet Racing	Riley & Scott Mk III	Ford 5.0 L V8	G	8	(United States) Henry Camferdam	All
(United States) Transatlantic Racing (United States) Supportnet Racing	Riley & Scott Mk III	Ford 5.0 L V8	G	8	(United States) Scott Schubot	All
(United States) Transatlantic Racing (United States) Supportnet Racing	Riley & Scott Mk III	Ford 5.0 L V8	G	8	(Chile) Eliseo Salazar	1
(United States) Transatlantic Racing (United States) Supportnet Racing	Riley & Scott Mk III	Ford 5.0 L V8	G	8	(United States) Duncan Dayton	1
(United States) Genesis Racing	Hawk MD3R	Chevrolet 6.0 L V8	G	12	(United States) Chuck Goldsborough	1
(United States) Genesis Racing	Hawk MD3R	Chevrolet 6.0 L V8	G	12	(United States) Kurt Baumann	1
(United States) Genesis Racing	Hawk MD3R	Chevrolet 6.0 L V8	G	12	(United States) Jeff Altenburg	1
(United States) Genesis Racing	Hawk MD3R	Chevrolet 6.0 L V8	G	12	(United States) Rick Fairbanks	1
(United States) Hybrid R&D	Riley & Scott Mk III	Ford 5.0 L V8	Y	15	(United States) Chris Bingham	1
(United States) Hybrid R&D	Riley & Scott Mk III	Ford 5.0 L V8	Y	15	(Canada) Ross Bentley	1
(United States) Hybrid R&D	Riley & Scott Mk III	Ford 5.0 L V8	Y	15	(France) Didier André	1
(United States) Hybrid R&D	Riley & Scott Mk III	Ford 5.0 L V8	Y	15	(France) Franck Fréon	1
(United States) Dyson Racing	Riley & Scott Mk III	Ford 5.0 L V8	G	16	(United Kingdom) James Weaver	All
(United States) Dyson Racing	Riley & Scott Mk III	Ford 5.0 L V8	G	16	(United States) Rob Dyson	1
(United States) Dyson Racing	Riley & Scott Mk III	Ford 5.0 L V8	G	16	(United States) Dorsey Schroeder	1
(United States) Dyson Racing	Riley & Scott Mk III	Ford 5.0 L V8	G	16	(United States) Stu Hayner	1
(United States) Dyson Racing	Riley & Scott Mk III	Ford 5.0 L V8	G	16	(United Kingdom) Andy Wallace	2–3
(United States) Dyson Racing	Riley & Scott Mk III	Ford 5.0 L V8	G	20	(United States) Butch Leitzinger	All
(United States) Dyson Racing	Riley & Scott Mk III	Ford 5.0 L V8	G	20	(United States) Elliott Forbes-Robinson	All
(United States) Dyson Racing	Riley & Scott Mk III	Ford 5.0 L V8	G	20	(United Kingdom) Andy Wallace	1
(United States) Dyson Racing	Riley & Scott Mk III	Ford 5.0 L V8	G	20	(United States) Rob Dyson	2
(United States) Jacobs Motorsports Ltd.	Courage C41	Chevrolet 5.0 L V8	?	17	(United States) Michael Jacobs	2
(United States) Jacobs Motorsports Ltd.	Courage C41	Chevrolet 5.0 L V8	?	17	(Canada) Jacek Mucha	2
(United States) Jacobs Motorsports Ltd.	Courage C41	Chevrolet 5.0 L V8	?	17	(United States) Frank Del Vecchio	2
(United States) Doran Lista Racing (United States) Doran Matthews Racing	Ferrari 333 SP	Ferrari F310E 4.0 L V12	M	27 72	(Switzerland) Fredy Lienhard	1–2
(United States) Doran Lista Racing (United States) Doran Matthews Racing	Ferrari 333 SP	Ferrari F310E 4.0 L V12	M	27 72	(Belgium) Didier Theys	1–2
(United States) Doran Lista Racing (United States) Doran Matthews Racing	Ferrari 333 SP	Ferrari F310E 4.0 L V12	M	27 72	(Netherlands) Arie Luyendyk	1
(United States) Doran Lista Racing (United States) Doran Matthews Racing	Ferrari 333 SP	Ferrari F310E 4.0 L V12	M	27 72	(Italy) Mauro Baldi	1
(United States) Doran Lista Racing (United States) Doran Matthews Racing	Ferrari 333 SP	Ferrari F310E 4.0 L V12	M	36	(United States) Jim Matthews	1–2
(United States) Doran Lista Racing (United States) Doran Matthews Racing	Ferrari 333 SP	Ferrari F310E 4.0 L V12	M	36	(Italy) Max Papis	1
(United States) Doran Lista Racing (United States) Doran Matthews Racing	Ferrari 333 SP	Ferrari F310E 4.0 L V12	M	36	(Sweden) Stefan Johansson	1
(United States) Doran Lista Racing (United States) Doran Matthews Racing	Ferrari 333 SP	Ferrari F310E 4.0 L V12	M	36	(United States) Jimmy Vasser	1
(United States) Doran Lista Racing (United States) Doran Matthews Racing	Ferrari 333 SP	Ferrari F310E 4.0 L V12	M	36	(Italy) Mauro Baldi	2
(United States) Intersport Wheel Works (United States) Intersport Racing	Lola B98/10	Ford (Roush) 6.0 L V8	G	28	(United States) Jon Field	All
(United States) Intersport Wheel Works (United States) Intersport Racing	Lola B98/10	Ford (Roush) 6.0 L V8	G	28	(United States) Ryan Jones	1, 3
(United States) Intersport Wheel Works (United States) Intersport Racing	Lola B98/10	Ford (Roush) 6.0 L V8	G	28	(United States) Sam Hornish, Jr.	1
(United States) Intersport Wheel Works (United States) Intersport Racing	Lola B98/10	Ford (Roush) 6.0 L V8	G	28	(United States) Michael Shank	1
(United States) Intersport Wheel Works (United States) Intersport Racing	Lola B98/10	Ford (Roush) 6.0 L V8	G	28	(Sweden) Niclas Jönsson	2
(United States) Intersport Wheel Works (United States) Intersport Racing	Riley & Scott Mk III	Ford 5.0 L V8	G	29	(United States) Sam Brown	1–2
(United States) Intersport Wheel Works (United States) Intersport Racing	Riley & Scott Mk III	Ford 5.0 L V8	G	29	(United States) John Mirro	1, 3
(United States) Intersport Wheel Works (United States) Intersport Racing	Riley & Scott Mk III	Ford 5.0 L V8	G	29	(United States) Butch Brickell	1
(United States) Intersport Wheel Works (United States) Intersport Racing	Riley & Scott Mk III	Ford 5.0 L V8	G	29	(Canada) Jacek Mucha	1
(United States) Intersport Wheel Works (United States) Intersport Racing	Riley & Scott Mk III	Ford 5.0 L V8	G	29	(United States) Andy Petery	2
(United States) Intersport Wheel Works (United States) Intersport Racing	Riley & Scott Mk III	Ford 5.0 L V8	G	29	(United States) Simon Gregg	3
(Germany) Konrad Motorsport	Lola B98/10	Lotus 3.5 L Turbo V8	D	32	(Netherlands) Jan Lammers	1
(Germany) Konrad Motorsport	Lola B98/10	Lotus 3.5 L Turbo V8	D	32	(Austria) Franz Konrad	1
(Germany) Konrad Motorsport	Lola B98/10	Lotus 3.5 L Turbo V8	D	32	(Italy) Vincenzo Sospiri	1
(United States) RaceStar Motorsports	Spice SE90	Chevrolet 5.0 L V8	G	47	(United States) Todd Vallancourt	1
(United States) RaceStar Motorsports	Spice SE90	Chevrolet 5.0 L V8	G	47	(United Kingdom) Ian James	1
(United States) RaceStar Motorsports	Spice SE90	Chevrolet 5.0 L V8	G	47	(United States) John G. Thomas	1
(United States) Kopf Precision	Keiler KII	Ford 5.0L V8	G	60	(United States) Kris Wilson	1
(United States) Kopf Precision	Keiler KII	Ford 5.0L V8	G	60	(United States) Tim Moser	1
(United States) Kopf Precision	Keiler KII	Ford 5.0L V8	G	60	(United States) Barry Waddell	1
(United States) Downing/Atlanta	Kudzu DLM	Mazda 2.0 L 3-Rotor	G	62	(Italy) Ermano Ronchi	1
(United States) Downing/Atlanta	Kudzu DLM	Mazda 2.0 L 3-Rotor	G	62	(United States) Ben Treadway	1
(United States) Downing/Atlanta	Kudzu DLM	Mazda 2.0 L 3-Rotor	G	62	(Italy) Fabio Montani	1
(United States) Downing/Atlanta	Kudzu DLM	Mazda 2.0 L 3-Rotor	G	62	(United States) Dennis Spencer	1
(United States) Downing/Atlanta	Kudzu DLY	Mazda R26B 2.6 L 4-Rotor	G	63	(United States) Jim Downing	All
(United States) Downing/Atlanta	Kudzu DLY	Mazda R26B 2.6 L 4-Rotor	G	63	(United States) Howard Katz	1–2
(United States) Downing/Atlanta	Kudzu DLY	Mazda R26B 2.6 L 4-Rotor	G	63	(United States) Chris Ronson	1, 3
(United States) Downing/Atlanta	Kudzu DLY	Mazda R26B 2.6 L 4-Rotor	G	63	(Japan) Yojiro Terada	1
(United States) Robinson Racing	Riley & Scott Mk III	Chevrolet 6.0 L V8	G	74	(United States) George Robinson	1, 3
(United States) Robinson Racing	Riley & Scott Mk III	Chevrolet 6.0 L V8	G	74	(United States) Jack Baldwin	1, 3
(United States) Robinson Racing	Riley & Scott Mk III	Chevrolet 6.0 L V8	G	74	(United States) Irv Hoerr	1
(United States) Robinson Racing	Riley & Scott Mk III	Chevrolet 6.0 L V8	G	74	(United States) Jon Gooding	1
(France) SBF Racing	Norma M14	Buick 4.5 L V8	?	78	(France) Patrice Roussel	1
(France) SBF Racing	Norma M14	Buick 4.5 L V8	?	78	(France) Edouard Sezionale	1
(France) SBF Racing	Norma M14	Buick 4.5 L V8	?	78	(France) Sylvain Boulay	1
(United States) Dollahite Racing	Ferrari 333 SP	Ferrari F310E 4.0 L V12	P	88	(United States) Bill Dollahite	1
(United States) Dollahite Racing	Ferrari 333 SP	Ferrari F310E 4.0 L V12	P	88	(United States) Mike Davies	1
(United States) Dollahite Racing	Ferrari 333 SP	Ferrari F310E 4.0 L V12	P	88	(United States) Doc Bundy	1
(United States) Dollahite Racing	Ferrari 333 SP	Ferrari F310E 4.0 L V12	P	88	(United States) Paul Dallenbach	1
(United States) Executive Auto Sport	Kudzu DLM	Buick 4.5 L V6	?	92	(United States) A. J. Smith	2
(United States) Executive Auto Sport	Kudzu DLM	Buick 4.5 L V6	?	92	(United States) Gerry Green	2
(United States) TRV Motorsport	Riley & Scott Mk III	Chevrolet 6.0 L V8	G	95	(United States) Jeret Schroeder	1
(United States) TRV Motorsport	Riley & Scott Mk III	Chevrolet 6.0 L V8	G	95	(United States) Tom Volk	1
(United States) TRV Motorsport	Riley & Scott Mk III	Chevrolet 6.0 L V8	G	95	(United States) Paul Debban	1
(United States) TRV Motorsport	Riley & Scott Mk III	Chevrolet 6.0 L V8	G	95	(United States) Richard Valentine	1

=== Grand Touring 2 (GT2) ===
Team	Chassis	Engine	Tyre	No.	Drivers	Rnds.
(United States) NP Racing	Dodge Viper GTS-R	Dodge 8.0 L V10	D	03	(United States) Bret Parker	1
(United States) NP Racing	Dodge Viper GTS-R	Dodge 8.0 L V10	D	03	(United States) Kevin Allen	1
(United States) NP Racing	Dodge Viper GTS-R	Dodge 8.0 L V10	D	03	(United States) Neil Hanneman	1
(United States) NP Racing	Dodge Viper GTS-R	Dodge 8.0 L V10	D	03	(United States) Larry E. Parker	1
(United States) G & W Motorsports	Porsche 993 GT2 R	Porsche 3.6 L Turbo Flat-6	D	08	(New Zealand) Rob Wilson	1
(United States) G & W Motorsports	Porsche 993 GT2 R	Porsche 3.6 L Turbo Flat-6	D	08	(United Kingdom) Martyn Konig	1
(United States) G & W Motorsports	Porsche 993 GT2 R	Porsche 3.6 L Turbo Flat-6	D	08	(United States) Jake Ulrich	1
(United States) G & W Motorsports	Porsche 993 GT2 R	Porsche 3.6 L Turbo Flat-6	D	08	(United Kingdom) Michael Pickup	1
(United States) Corvette Racing	Chevrolet Corvette C5-R	Chevrolet 6.0 L V8	G	2	(Canada) Ron Fellows	1
(United States) Corvette Racing	Chevrolet Corvette C5-R	Chevrolet 6.0 L V8	G	2	(United States) Chris Kneifel	1
(United States) Corvette Racing	Chevrolet Corvette C5-R	Chevrolet 6.0 L V8	G	2	(United States) John Paul Jr.	1
(United States) Corvette Racing	Chevrolet Corvette C5-R	Chevrolet 6.0 L V8	G	4	(United States) Scott Sharp	1
(United States) Corvette Racing	Chevrolet Corvette C5-R	Chevrolet 6.0 L V8	G	4	(United States) Andy Pilgrim	1
(United States) Corvette Racing	Chevrolet Corvette C5-R	Chevrolet 6.0 L V8	G	4	(United States) John Heinricy	1
(United States) SSZ Motorcars	SSZ Stradale Mk III	Nissan 3.0L Turbo V6	?	4	(United States) John Engel	2–3
(United States) SSZ Motorcars	SSZ Stradale Mk III	Nissan 3.0L Turbo V6	?	4	(United States) Mark Knepper	2–3
(Switzerland) Haberthur Racing	Porsche 993 GT2 R	Porsche 3.6 L Turbo Flat-6	D	21	(Italy) Gabrio Rosa	1
(Switzerland) Haberthur Racing	Porsche 993 GT2 R	Porsche 3.6 L Turbo Flat-6	D	21	(Italy) Roberto Mangifesta	1
(Switzerland) Haberthur Racing	Porsche 993 GT2 R	Porsche 3.6 L Turbo Flat-6	D	21	(Italy) Stefano Zonca	1
(Switzerland) Haberthur Racing	Porsche 993 GT2 R	Porsche 3.6 L Turbo Flat-6	D	21	(Italy) Fabio Rosa	1
(Switzerland) Haberthur Racing	Porsche 993 GT2 R	Porsche 3.6 L Turbo Flat-6	D	31	(Italy) Mauro Casadei	1
(Switzerland) Haberthur Racing	Porsche 993 GT2 R	Porsche 3.6 L Turbo Flat-6	D	31	(Italy) Francesco Ciani	1
(Switzerland) Haberthur Racing	Porsche 993 GT2 R	Porsche 3.6 L Turbo Flat-6	D	31	(Italy) Stefano Bucci	1
(Switzerland) Haberthur Racing	Porsche 993 GT2 R	Porsche 3.6 L Turbo Flat-6	D	31	(Italy) Andrea Garbagnati	1
(United States) Mosler Automotive	Mosler Intruder	Chevrolet 5.7 L V8	P	30	(France) Loic Depailler	2–3
(United States) Mosler Automotive	Mosler Intruder	Chevrolet 5.7 L V8	P	30	(Canada) Stephane Roy	2–3
(United States) Mosler Automotive	Mosler Intruder	Chevrolet 5.7 L V8	P	30	(Portugal) João Barbosa	2–3
(Germany) Konrad Motorsport	Porsche 993 GT2	Porsche 3.6 L Turbo Flat-6	D	33	(Germany) Altfrid Heger	1
(Germany) Konrad Motorsport	Porsche 993 GT2	Porsche 3.6 L Turbo Flat-6	D	33	(United States) Peter Kitchak	1
(Germany) Konrad Motorsport	Porsche 993 GT2	Porsche 3.6 L Turbo Flat-6	D	33	(United States) Charles Slater	1
(Germany) Konrad Motorsport	Porsche 993 GT2	Porsche 3.6 L Turbo Flat-6	D	33	(Austria) Franz Konrad	1
(Germany) Freisinger Motorsport	Porsche 993 GT2	Porsche 3.6 L Turbo Flat-6	P	48	(Germany) Wolfgang Kaufmann	1
(Germany) Freisinger Motorsport	Porsche 993 GT2	Porsche 3.6 L Turbo Flat-6	P	48	(France) Michel Ligonnet	1
(Germany) Freisinger Motorsport	Porsche 993 GT2	Porsche 3.6 L Turbo Flat-6	P	48	(United States) Lance Stewart	1
(Germany) Freisinger Motorsport	Porsche 993 GT2	Porsche 3.6 L Turbo Flat-6	P	49	(Germany) Michael Irmgratz	1
(Germany) Freisinger Motorsport	Porsche 993 GT2	Porsche 3.6 L Turbo Flat-6	P	49	(Austria) Mandfred Jurasz	1
(Germany) Freisinger Motorsport	Porsche 993 GT2	Porsche 3.6 L Turbo Flat-6	P	49	(France) Eric van der Vyver	1
(Germany) Freisinger Motorsport	Porsche 993 GT2	Porsche 3.6 L Turbo Flat-6	P	49	(Germany) Klaus Horn	1
(France) Viper Team Oreca	Dodge Viper GTS-R	Dodge 8.0 L V10	M	50	(Monaco) Olivier Beretta	1
(France) Viper Team Oreca	Dodge Viper GTS-R	Dodge 8.0 L V10	M	50	(United States) David Donohue	1
(France) Viper Team Oreca	Dodge Viper GTS-R	Dodge 8.0 L V10	M	50	(United States) Tommy Archer	1
(United States) Easton Properties Corp.	Acura NSX-R	Acura ??	P	52	(United States) Paul Arnold	1
(United States) Easton Properties Corp.	Acura NSX-R	Acura ??	P	52	(United States) William Stitt	1
(United States) Easton Properties Corp.	Acura NSX-R	Acura ??	P	52	(Canada) Victor Sifton	1
(United States) Easton Properties Corp.	Acura NSX-R	Acura ??	P	52	(United States) Simon Gregg	1
(Germany) Proton Competition	Porsche 993 GT2	Porsche 3.6 L Turbo Flat-6	D	55	(Switzerland) Toni Seiler	1
(Germany) Proton Competition	Porsche 993 GT2	Porsche 3.6 L Turbo Flat-6	D	55	(Germany) Gerold Ried	1
(Germany) Proton Competition	Porsche 993 GT2	Porsche 3.6 L Turbo Flat-6	D	55	(France) Patrick Vuillaume	1
(Germany) Proton Competition	Porsche 993 GT2	Porsche 3.6 L Turbo Flat-6	D	55	(Germany) Gerd Ruch	1
(Netherlands) Marcos Racing	Marcos Mantara LM600	Chevrolet 5.9 L V8	D	70	(Netherlands) Cor Euser	1
(Netherlands) Marcos Racing	Marcos Mantara LM600	Chevrolet 5.9 L V8	D	70	(Netherlands) Herman Buurman	1
(Netherlands) Marcos Racing	Marcos Mantara LM600	Chevrolet 5.9 L V8	D	70	(Netherlands) Peter van der Kolk	1
(Netherlands) Marcos Racing	Marcos Mantara LM600	Chevrolet 5.9 L V8	D	70	(United Kingdom) Christian Vann	1
(United States) Dura Motorsports	Chevrolet Camaro	Chevrolet 5.7 L V8	H	71	(United Kingdom) Michael DeFontes	3
(United States) Dura Motorsports	Chevrolet Camaro	Chevrolet 5.7 L V8	H	71	(United States) Chris Thompson	3
(United States) Dura Motorsports	Chevrolet Camaro	Chevrolet 5.7 L V8	H	71	(United States) Jerry Thompson	3
(United States) Pettit Racing	Mazda RX-7	Mazda 13B 2.0 L 3-Rotor	H	75	(United States) Cameron Worth	1
(United States) Pettit Racing	Mazda RX-7	Mazda 13B 2.0 L 3-Rotor	H	75	(United States) Scott Sansone	1
(United States) Pettit Racing	Mazda RX-7	Mazda 13B 2.0 L 3-Rotor	H	75	(United States) Steve Pfeifer	1
(United States) Pettit Racing	Mazda RX-7	Mazda 13B 2.0 L 3-Rotor	H	75	(United States) Ryan Hampton	1
(Germany) Seikel Motorsport	Porsche 993 GT2	Porsche 3.6 L Turbo Flat-6	D	77	(New Zealand) Andrew Bagnall	1
(Germany) Seikel Motorsport	Porsche 993 GT2	Porsche 3.6 L Turbo Flat-6	D	77	(Italy) Renato Mastropietro	1
(Germany) Seikel Motorsport	Porsche 993 GT2	Porsche 3.6 L Turbo Flat-6	D	77	(Canada) Tony Burgess	1
(Germany) Seikel Motorsport	Porsche 993 GT2	Porsche 3.6 L Turbo Flat-6	D	77	(Belgium) Michel Neugarten	1
(United States) Extreme Motor Racing	Chevrolet Corvette	Chevrolet 5.7 L V8	G	80	(United States) Glenn Seward	2
(United States) Extreme Motor Racing	Chevrolet Corvette	Chevrolet 5.7 L V8	G	80	(United States) David Galpin	2
(United States) Extreme Motor Racing	Chevrolet Corvette	Chevrolet 5.7 L V8	G	80	(United States) Dean K. Clark	2
(United Kingdom) Chamberlain Engineering	Chrysler Viper GTS-R	Chrysler 8.0 L V10	D	81	(United States) Chris Gleason	1
(United Kingdom) Chamberlain Engineering	Chrysler Viper GTS-R	Chrysler 8.0 L V10	D	81	(Germany) Christian Gläsel	1
(United Kingdom) Chamberlain Engineering	Chrysler Viper GTS-R	Chrysler 8.0 L V10	D	81	(United States) Brian Hornkohl	1
(United Kingdom) Chamberlain Engineering	Chrysler Viper GTS-R	Chrysler 8.0 L V10	D	81	(Netherlands) Hans Hugenholtz	1
(Germany) Roock Racing	Porsche 993 GT2	Porsche 3.8 L Turbo Flat-6	Y	82	(Monaco) Stéphane Ortelli	1
(Germany) Roock Racing	Porsche 993 GT2	Porsche 3.8 L Turbo Flat-6	Y	82	(Italy) Enrico Bertaggia	1
(Germany) Roock Racing	Porsche 993 GT2	Porsche 3.8 L Turbo Flat-6	Y	82	(Germany) Claudia Hürtgen	1
(Germany) Roock Racing	Porsche 993 GT2	Porsche 3.8 L Turbo Flat-6	Y	82	(United Kingdom) Robert Nearn	1
(Germany) Roock Racing	Porsche 993 GT2	Porsche 3.8 L Turbo Flat-6	Y	83	(Germany) André Ahrlé	1
(Germany) Roock Racing	Porsche 993 GT2	Porsche 3.8 L Turbo Flat-6	Y	83	(Italy) Raffaele Sangiuolo	1
(Germany) Roock Racing	Porsche 993 GT2	Porsche 3.8 L Turbo Flat-6	Y	83	(United Kingdom) David Warnock	1
(Germany) Roock Racing	Porsche 993 GT2	Porsche 3.8 L Turbo Flat-6	Y	83	(Germany) Hubert Haupt	1
(United States) Ross Racing	Porsche 993 GT2	Porsche 3.6 L Turbo Flat-6	P	83	(United States) Michael Schrom	2
(United States) Ross Racing	Porsche 993 GT2	Porsche 3.6 L Turbo Flat-6	P	83	(United States) Stephen Earle	2
(United States) Schumacher Racing	Porsche 993 GT2	Porsche 3.6 L Turbo Flat-6	M G	99	(United States) Larry Schumacher	1, 3
(United States) Schumacher Racing	Porsche 993 GT2	Porsche 3.6 L Turbo Flat-6	M G	99	(United States) John O'Steen	1, 3
(United States) Schumacher Racing	Porsche 993 GT2	Porsche 3.6 L Turbo Flat-6	M G	99	(United States) Martin Snow	1
(United States) Schumacher Racing	Porsche 993 GT2	Porsche 3.6 L Turbo Flat-6	M G	99	(Germany) Dirk Müller	1

=== Grand Touring 3 (GT3) ===
Team	Chassis	Engine	Tyre	No.	Drivers	Rnds.
(United States) Greycliff Racing	Porsche 993 Carrera RSR	Porsche 3.8 L Flat-6	?	01	(United States) James Nelson	1
(United States) Greycliff Racing	Porsche 993 Carrera RSR	Porsche 3.8 L Flat-6	?	01	(United States) John Drew	1
(United States) Greycliff Racing	Porsche 993 Carrera RSR	Porsche 3.8 L Flat-6	?	01	(United States) Beran Peter	1
(United States) Greycliff Racing	Porsche 993 Carrera RSR	Porsche 3.8 L Flat-6	?	01	(United States) Jim Michaelian	1
(United States) Greycliff Racing	Porsche 993 Carrera RSR	Porsche 3.8 L Flat-6	?	01	(United States) Mark Greenberg	1
(United States) Reiser/Callas Rennsport	Porsche 993 Carrera RSR	Porsche 3.8 L Flat-6	Y	02	(United States) David Murry	1, 3
(United States) Reiser/Callas Rennsport	Porsche 993 Carrera RSR	Porsche 3.8 L Flat-6	Y	02	(United Kingdom) Johnny Mowlem	1, 3
(United States) Reiser/Callas Rennsport	Porsche 993 Carrera RSR	Porsche 3.8 L Flat-6	Y	02	(United States) Grady Willingham	1
(United States) Reiser/Callas Rennsport	Porsche 993 Carrera RSR	Porsche 3.8 L Flat-6	Y	02	(United States) Joel Reiser	1
(United States) Reiser/Callas Rennsport	Porsche 993 Carrera RSR	Porsche 3.8 L Flat-6	Y	92 03	(United States) Joel Reiser	1, 3
(United States) Reiser/Callas Rennsport	Porsche 993 Carrera RSR	Porsche 3.8 L Flat-6	Y	92 03	(United Kingdom) Johnny Mowlem	1
(United States) Reiser/Callas Rennsport	Porsche 993 Carrera RSR	Porsche 3.8 L Flat-6	Y	92 03	(United States) Grady Willingham	1
(United States) Reiser/Callas Rennsport	Porsche 993 Carrera RSR	Porsche 3.8 L Flat-6	Y	92 03	(United States) David Murry	1
(United States) Reiser/Callas Rennsport	Porsche 993 Carrera RSR	Porsche 3.8 L Flat-6	Y	92 03	(United States) Craig Stanton	3
(United States) Schmidt Motorsports	Porsche 993 Carrera RSR	Porsche 3.8 L Flat-6	?	04	(United States) Max Schmidt	1
(United States) Schmidt Motorsports	Porsche 993 Carrera RSR	Porsche 3.8 L Flat-6	?	04	(United States) Rusty Schmidt	1
(United States) Schmidt Motorsports	Porsche 993 Carrera RSR	Porsche 3.8 L Flat-6	?	04	(United States) Jeff Conkel	1
(United States) Schmidt Motorsports	Porsche 993 Carrera RSR	Porsche 3.8 L Flat-6	?	04	(United States) Scott Harrington	1*
(United States) G & W Motorsports	Porsche 993 Carrera RSR	Porsche 3.8 L Flat-6	P	07	(United States) Darren Law	1, 3
(United States) G & W Motorsports	Porsche 993 Carrera RSR	Porsche 3.8 L Flat-6	P	07	(United States) Steve Marshall	1
(United States) G & W Motorsports	Porsche 993 Carrera RSR	Porsche 3.8 L Flat-6	P	07	(Netherlands) Patrick Huisman	1
(United States) G & W Motorsports	Porsche 993 Carrera RSR	Porsche 3.8 L Flat-6	P	07	(Canada) Sylvain Tremblay	1
(United States) G & W Motorsports	Porsche 993 Carrera RSR	Porsche 3.8 L Flat-6	P	07	(United States) Danny Marshall	1
(United States) G & W Motorsports	Porsche 993 Carrera RSR	Porsche 3.8 L Flat-6	P	07	(United States) Cort Wagner	3
(United States) G & W Motorsports	Porsche 993 Carrera RSR	Porsche 3.8 L Flat-6	P	08	(United States) Steve Marshall	2–3
(United States) G & W Motorsports	Porsche 993 Carrera RSR	Porsche 3.8 L Flat-6	P	08	(United States) Cort Wagner	2
(United States) G & W Motorsports	Porsche 993 Carrera RSR	Porsche 3.8 L Flat-6	P	08	(United States) Danny Marshall	3
(United States) Spirit of Daytona Racing	Mitsubishi Eclipse	Mitsubishi I4	T	09	(United States) Craig Conway	1
(United States) Spirit of Daytona Racing	Mitsubishi Eclipse	Mitsubishi I4	T	09	(United States) Eric van Cleef	1
(United States) Spirit of Daytona Racing	Mitsubishi Eclipse	Mitsubishi I4	T	09	(United States) Todd Flis	1
(United States) Toad Hall Motor Racing	Porsche 993 Carrera RSR	Porsche 3.8 L Flat-6	?	3	(United States) Peter Kitchak	2–3
(United States) Prototype Technology Group	BMW M3 (E36)	BMW 3.2 L I6	Y	6	(United States) Peter Cunningham	1–2
(United States) Prototype Technology Group	BMW M3 (E36)	BMW 3.2 L I6	Y	6	(United States) Mark Simo	1–2
(United States) Prototype Technology Group	BMW M3 (E36)	BMW 3.2 L I6	Y	6	(United States) Boris Said	1
(United States) Prototype Technology Group	BMW M3 (E36)	BMW 3.2 L I6	Y	6	(Austria) Dieter Quester	1
(United States) Prototype Technology Group	BMW M3 (E36)	BMW 3.2 L I6	Y	7	(United States) Brian Cunningham	2
(United States) Prototype Technology Group	BMW M3 (E36)	BMW 3.2 L I6	Y	7	(United States) Johannes van Overbeek	2
(United States) Prototype Technology Group	BMW M3 (E36)	BMW 3.2 L I6	Y	10	(Germany) Hans-Joachim Stuck	1–2
(United States) Prototype Technology Group	BMW M3 (E36)	BMW 3.2 L I6	Y	10	(United States) Bill Auberlen	1
(United States) Prototype Technology Group	BMW M3 (E36)	BMW 3.2 L I6	Y	10	(United States) Brian Cunningham	1
(United States) Prototype Technology Group	BMW M3 (E36)	BMW 3.2 L I6	Y	10	(United States) Johannes van Overbeek	1
(United States) Prototype Technology Group	BMW M3 (E36)	BMW 3.2 L I6	Y	10	(United States) Boris Said	2
(United States) Team Tech Racing	Porsche 911 Supercup	Porsche 3.8 L Flat-6	?	12	(United States) Joe Nonnamaker	3
(United States) Team Tech Racing	Porsche 911 Supercup	Porsche 3.8 L Flat-6	?	12	(United States) Scott Bove	3
(United States) T. C. Kline Racing	BMW M3 (E36)	BMW 3.2 L I6	Y	17	(United States) Shane Lewis	1
(United States) T. C. Kline Racing	BMW M3 (E36)	BMW 3.2 L I6	Y	17	(United States) Randy Pobst	1
(United States) T. C. Kline Racing	BMW M3 (E36)	BMW 3.2 L I6	Y	17	(United States) Bob Mazzuoccola	1
(United States) T. C. Kline Racing	BMW M3 (E36)	BMW 3.2 L I6	Y	17	(United States) Mark Raccaro	1
(United States) Millennium Motorsports	Porsche 993 Carrera RSR	Porsche 3.8 L Flat-6	Y	18 90	(United States) David Friedman	1–2
(United States) Millennium Motorsports	Porsche 993 Carrera RSR	Porsche 3.8 L Flat-6	Y	18 90	(United States) Chris Miller	1
(United States) Millennium Motorsports	Porsche 993 Carrera RSR	Porsche 3.8 L Flat-6	Y	18 90	(United States) Vic Rice	1
(United States) Millennium Motorsports	Porsche 993 Carrera RSR	Porsche 3.8 L Flat-6	Y	18 90	(United States) Geoff Auberlen	1
(United States) Millennium Motorsports	Porsche 993 Carrera RSR	Porsche 3.8 L Flat-6	Y	18 90	(United States) Beran Peter	1
(United States) Millennium Motorsports	Porsche 993 Carrera RSR	Porsche 3.8 L Flat-6	Y	18 90	(United States) Cort Wagner	2
(United States) Alex Job Racing	Porsche 993 Carrera RSR	Porsche 3.8 L Flat-6	Y	22	(United States) Don Kitch	1
(United States) Alex Job Racing	Porsche 993 Carrera RSR	Porsche 3.8 L Flat-6	Y	22	(United States) Kim Wolfkill	1
(United States) Alex Job Racing	Porsche 993 Carrera RSR	Porsche 3.8 L Flat-6	Y	22	(United States) John Hill	1
(United States) Alex Job Racing	Porsche 993 Carrera RSR	Porsche 3.8 L Flat-6	Y	22	(United States) Wade Gaughran	1
(United States) Alex Job Racing	Porsche 993 Carrera RSR	Porsche 3.8 L Flat-6	Y	23	(United States) Kelly Collins	1
(United States) Alex Job Racing	Porsche 993 Carrera RSR	Porsche 3.8 L Flat-6	Y	23	(United States) Cort Wagner	1
(United States) Alex Job Racing	Porsche 993 Carrera RSR	Porsche 3.8 L Flat-6	Y	23	(United States) Anthony Lazzaro	1
(United States) Alex Job Racing	Porsche 993 Carrera RSR	Porsche 3.8 L Flat-6	Y	23	(United States) Darryl Havens	1
(United States) Michael Jacobs	Ferrari 348	Ferrari 3.4 L Tipo F119 V8	P	24	(United States) Michael Jacobs	1
(United States) Michael Jacobs	Ferrari 348	Ferrari 3.4 L Tipo F119 V8	P	24	(United States) George Biskup	1
(United States) Michael Jacobs	Ferrari 348	Ferrari 3.4 L Tipo F119 V8	P	24	(United States) John Steinmetz	1
(United States) Michael Jacobs	Ferrari 348	Ferrari 3.4 L Tipo F119 V8	P	24	(United Kingdom) Michael DeFontes	1
(United States) Michael Jacobs	Ferrari 348	Ferrari 3.4 L Tipo F119 V8	P	24	(United States) Frank Del Vecchio	1
(Germany) RWS-Brun Motorsport	Porsche 993 Carrera RSR	Porsche 3.8 L Flat-6	M	25	(Austria) Hans-Jörg Hofer	1
(Germany) RWS-Brun Motorsport	Porsche 993 Carrera RSR	Porsche 3.8 L Flat-6	M	25	(Italy) Luca Riccitelli	1
(Germany) RWS-Brun Motorsport	Porsche 993 Carrera RSR	Porsche 3.8 L Flat-6	M	25	(Germany) Günther Blieninger	1
(Germany) RWS-Brun Motorsport	Porsche 993 Carrera RSR	Porsche 3.8 L Flat-6	M	25	(Italy) Fabio Mancini	1
(United States) Goldin Brothers Racing	Mazda RX-7	Mazda 13B 2.0 L 3-Rotor	H	27	(United States) Keith Goldin	1
(United States) Goldin Brothers Racing	Mazda RX-7	Mazda 13B 2.0 L 3-Rotor	H	27	(United States) Steve Goldin	1
(United States) Goldin Brothers Racing	Mazda RX-7	Mazda 13B 2.0 L 3-Rotor	H	27	(United States) Scott Finlay	1
(United States) Goldin Brothers Racing	Mazda RX-7	Mazda 13B 2.0 L 3-Rotor	H	27	(United States) Dave Russell	1
(United States) Pumpelly/Mitchum Motorsports (United States) Spencer Pumpelly Racing	Porsche 993 Carrera RSR	Porsche 3.8 L Flat-6	G	39 64	(United States) Spencer Pumpelly	All
(United States) Pumpelly/Mitchum Motorsports (United States) Spencer Pumpelly Racing	Porsche 993 Carrera RSR	Porsche 3.8 L Flat-6	G	39 64	(United States) Chris Mitchum	1
(United States) Pumpelly/Mitchum Motorsports (United States) Spencer Pumpelly Racing	Porsche 993 Carrera RSR	Porsche 3.8 L Flat-6	G	39 64	(United States) David Kicak	1
(United States) Pumpelly/Mitchum Motorsports (United States) Spencer Pumpelly Racing	Porsche 993 Carrera RSR	Porsche 3.8 L Flat-6	G	39 64	(United States) Bill Lester	1
(United States) Pumpelly/Mitchum Motorsports (United States) Spencer Pumpelly Racing	Porsche 993 Carrera RSR	Porsche 3.8 L Flat-6	G	39 64	(France) Pascal Dro	1
(United States) Pumpelly/Mitchum Motorsports (United States) Spencer Pumpelly Racing	Porsche 993 Carrera RSR	Porsche 3.8 L Flat-6	G	39 64	(United States) Josh Rehm	2–3
(Italy) Supertech S. B. Racing	Ferrari F355	Ferrari F129 B/C 3.5 L V8	P	42	(Italy) Pierangelo Masselli	1
(Italy) Supertech S. B. Racing	Ferrari F355	Ferrari F129 B/C 3.5 L V8	P	42	(Italy) Marco De Iturbe	1
(Italy) Supertech S. B. Racing	Ferrari F355	Ferrari F129 B/C 3.5 L V8	P	42	(Italy) Gianluca de Lorenzi	1
(Italy) Supertech S. B. Racing	Ferrari F355	Ferrari F129 B/C 3.5 L V8	P	42	(Italy) Gianni Biava	1
(Italy) Supertech S. B. Racing	Ferrari F355	Ferrari F129 B/C 3.5 L V8	P	42	(Italy) Franco Scapini	1
(United States) Specter Werks Sports	Chevrolet Corvette	Chevrolet ?? V8	H	44	(United States) Jeff Nowicki	1
(United States) Specter Werks Sports	Chevrolet Corvette	Chevrolet ?? V8	H	44	(United States) R. K. Smith	1
(United States) Specter Werks Sports	Chevrolet Corvette	Chevrolet ?? V8	H	44	(United States) Rick Mancuso	1
(United States) Specter Werks Sports	Chevrolet Corvette	Chevrolet ?? V8	H	44	(United States) Tom Murphy	1
(United States) Specter Werks Sports	Chevrolet Corvette	Chevrolet ?? V8	H	44	(United States) Mike Farmer	1
(United States) Bell Motorsports	BMW M3 (E36)	BMW 3.2 L I6	Y	45	(United States) Peter Baron	1
(United States) Bell Motorsports	BMW M3 (E36)	BMW 3.2 L I6	Y	45	(United States) James McCormick	1
(United States) Bell Motorsports	BMW M3 (E36)	BMW 3.2 L I6	Y	45	(Australia) Barry Graham	1
(United States) Bell Motorsports	BMW M3 (E36)	BMW 3.2 L I6	Y	45	(United States) Leo Hindery	1
(United States) Bell Motorsports	BMW M3 (E36)	BMW 3.2 L I6	Y	45	(United States) Brian Till	1
(United States) Bell Motorsports	BMW M3 (E36)	BMW 3.2 L I6	Y	54	(United States) Tony Kester	1
(United States) Bell Motorsports	BMW M3 (E36)	BMW 3.2 L I6	Y	54	(United States) Matt Drendel	1
(United States) Bell Motorsports	BMW M3 (E36)	BMW 3.2 L I6	Y	54	(United States) Terry Borcheller	1
(United States) Bell Motorsports	BMW M3 (E36)	BMW 3.2 L I6	Y	54	(United States) James A. Kenton	1
(United States) Bell Motorsports	BMW M3 (E36)	BMW 3.2 L I6	Y	54	(United States) Scott Neuman	1
(United States) Aspen Knolls Racing	BMW M3 (E36)	BMW 3.2 L I6	Y	51	(United States) Shane Lewis	2–3
(United States) Aspen Knolls Racing	BMW M3 (E36)	BMW 3.2 L I6	Y	51	(United States) Bob Mazzuoccola	2
(United States) Aspen Knolls Racing	BMW M3 (E36)	BMW 3.2 L I6	Y	51	(United States) Andy Pilgrim	3
(Germany) Manthey Racing	Porsche 993 Carrera RSR	Porsche 3.8 L Flat-6	P	56	(Belgium) Hans Willems	1
(Germany) Manthey Racing	Porsche 993 Carrera RSR	Porsche 3.8 L Flat-6	P	56	(Germany) Olaf Manthey	1
(Germany) Manthey Racing	Porsche 993 Carrera RSR	Porsche 3.8 L Flat-6	P	56	(Germany) Marc Gindorf	1
(Germany) Manthey Racing	Porsche 993 Carrera RSR	Porsche 3.8 L Flat-6	P	56	(Germany) Ulrich Gallade	1
(Germany) Manthey Racing	Porsche 993 Carrera RSR	Porsche 3.8 L Flat-6	P	56	(Germany) Ulli Richter	1
(United States) Kryderacing	Nissan 240SX	Nissan ?? V6	G	57	(United States) Reed Kryder	All
(United States) Kryderacing	Nissan 240SX	Nissan ?? V6	G	57	(United States) Steve Ahlgrim	1, 3
(United States) Kryderacing	Nissan 240SX	Nissan ?? V6	G	57	(France) Christian Heinkélé	1
(United States) Kryderacing	Nissan 240SX	Nissan ?? V6	G	57	(United States) John Steinmetz	2
(United States) Paragon Motorsports	Porsche 964 Cup	Porsche 3.6 L Flat-6	P	61	(United States) Keith Fisher	2–3
(United States) Paragon Motorsports	Porsche 964 Cup	Porsche 3.6 L Flat-6	P	61	(United States) Scott Brunk	2–3
(Italy) M.A.C. Racing	Porsche 993 Cup	Porsche 3.8 L Flat-6	?	66	(Italy) Massimo Morini	1
(Italy) M.A.C. Racing	Porsche 993 Cup	Porsche 3.8 L Flat-6	?	66	(Italy) Angelo Scarpetta	1
(Italy) M.A.C. Racing	Porsche 993 Cup	Porsche 3.8 L Flat-6	?	66	(Italy) Luca Cattaneo	1
(Italy) M.A.C. Racing	Porsche 993 Cup	Porsche 3.8 L Flat-6	?	66	(Italy) Luciano Tamburini	1
(Italy) M.A.C. Racing	Porsche 993 Cup	Porsche 3.8 L Flat-6	?	66	(Italy) Antonio De Castro	1
(United States) The Racer's Group	Porsche 993 Carrera RSR	Porsche 3.8 L Flat-6	G	67	(United States) Steve Pelke	1
(United States) The Racer's Group	Porsche 993 Carrera RSR	Porsche 3.8 L Flat-6	G	67	(United States) Brian Pelke	1
(United States) The Racer's Group	Porsche 993 Carrera RSR	Porsche 3.8 L Flat-6	G	67	(United States) Ron Herrerias	1
(United States) The Racer's Group	Porsche 993 Carrera RSR	Porsche 3.8 L Flat-6	G	67	(United States) Pat DiGiovanni	1
(United States) The Racer's Group	Porsche 993 Carrera RSR	Porsche 3.8 L Flat-6	G	68	(United States) Kevin Buckler	1
(United States) The Racer's Group	Porsche 993 Carrera RSR	Porsche 3.8 L Flat-6	G	68	(United States) Mike Conte	1
(United States) The Racer's Group	Porsche 993 Carrera RSR	Porsche 3.8 L Flat-6	G	68	(United Kingdom) Nick Holt	1
(United States) The Racer's Group	Porsche 993 Carrera RSR	Porsche 3.8 L Flat-6	G	68	(Belgium) Bruno Lambert	1
(France) Perspective Racing	Porsche 993 Carrera RSR	Porsche 3.8 L Flat-6	P	69	(France) Bob Wollek	1
(France) Perspective Racing	Porsche 993 Carrera RSR	Porsche 3.8 L Flat-6	P	69	(France) Thierry Perrier	1
(France) Perspective Racing	Porsche 993 Carrera RSR	Porsche 3.8 L Flat-6	P	69	(France) Jean-Louis Ricci	1
(France) Perspective Racing	Porsche 993 Carrera RSR	Porsche 3.8 L Flat-6	P	69	(France) Gérard Larrousse	1
(France) Perspective Racing	Porsche 993 Carrera RSR	Porsche 3.8 L Flat-6	P	69	(France) Jean-Paul Richard	1
(United States) Dura Motorsports	Chevrolet Camaro	Chevrolet 5.7 L V8	?	71	(United Kingdom) Michael DeFontes	2
(United States) Dura Motorsports	Chevrolet Camaro	Chevrolet 5.7 L V8	?	71	(United States) Chris Thompson	2
(United States) Jack Lewis Enterprises (United States) Autosport South	Porsche 993 Carrera RSR	Porsche 3.8 L Flat-6	G	73	(United States) Kevin Wheeler	1
(United States) Jack Lewis Enterprises (United States) Autosport South	Porsche 993 Carrera RSR	Porsche 3.8 L Flat-6	G	73	(United States) Jack Lewis	1
(United States) Jack Lewis Enterprises (United States) Autosport South	Porsche 993 Carrera RSR	Porsche 3.8 L Flat-6	G	73	(Italy) Ludovico Manfredi	1
(United States) Jack Lewis Enterprises (United States) Autosport South	Porsche 993 Carrera RSR	Porsche 3.8 L Flat-6	G	73	(Japan) Kiichi Takahashi	1
(United States) Jack Lewis Enterprises (United States) Autosport South	Porsche 993 Carrera RSR	Porsche 3.8 L Flat-6	G	73	(United States) Ron Henriksen	1
(United States) Team A.R.E.	Porsche 993 Carrera RSR	Porsche 3.8 L Flat-6	Y	76	(United States) Peter Argetsinger	1
(United States) Team A.R.E.	Porsche 993 Carrera RSR	Porsche 3.8 L Flat-6	Y	76	(United States) Richard Polidori	1
(United States) Team A.R.E.	Porsche 993 Carrera RSR	Porsche 3.8 L Flat-6	Y	76	(United States) Steve Hill	1
(United States) Team A.R.E.	Porsche 993 Carrera RSR	Porsche 3.8 L Flat-6	Y	76	(Canada) John McCaig	1
(United States) Fahlgren Racing	Mazda RX-7	Mazda 2.0 L 3-Rotor	?	81	(United States) Lester Fahlgren	3
(United States) Fahlgren Racing	Mazda RX-7	Mazda 2.0 L 3-Rotor	?	81	(United States) Dick Greer	3
(United States) Broadfoot Racing	Porsche 944 Turbo	??	D	39	(Germany) Neil Crilly	1
(United States) Broadfoot Racing	Porsche 944 Turbo	??	D	39	(United States) Caroline Wright	1
(United States) Broadfoot Racing	Porsche 944 Turbo	??	D	39	(France) Phillipe Lenain	1
(United States) Broadfoot Racing	Porsche 944 Turbo	??	D	39	(United States) Mike Borkowski	1
(United States) Broadfoot Racing	Porsche 944 Turbo	??	D	39	(United States) Scott Bove	1
(Ecuador) Saeta Airlines Racing	Nissan 240SX	Nissan ?? V6	Y	93	(Ecuador) Henry Taleb	1
(Ecuador) Saeta Airlines Racing	Nissan 240SX	Nissan ?? V6	Y	93	(Ecuador) Jean-Pierre Michelet	1
(Ecuador) Saeta Airlines Racing	Nissan 240SX	Nissan ?? V6	Y	93	(Ecuador) Marcelo Darquea	1
(Ecuador) Saeta Airlines Racing	Nissan 240SX	Nissan ?? V6	Y	93	(Ecuador) Walter Jimenez	1

=== GTT ===
Team	Chassis	Engine	Tyre	No.	Drivers	Rnds.
(United States) DM Motorsports	Chevrolet Camaro (Evans)	Chevrolet V8	?	13	(United States) Mark Montgomery	1
(United States) DM Motorsports	Chevrolet Camaro (Evans)	Chevrolet V8	?	13	(United States) Martin Shuster	1
(United States) DM Motorsports	Chevrolet Camaro (Evans)	Chevrolet V8	?	13	(United States) Bruce Trenery	1
(United States) DM Motorsports	Chevrolet Camaro (Evans)	Chevrolet V8	?	13	(United States) Dick Greer	1
(United States) DM Motorsports	Chevrolet Camaro (Evans)	Chevrolet V8	?	13	(United States) Spencer Trenery	1
(United States) SK Group Motorsports	Ford Mustang Cobra (Riley & Scott)	Ford V8	G	19	(United States) Kyle McIntyre	1
(United States) SK Group Motorsports	Ford Mustang Cobra (Riley & Scott)	Ford V8	G	19	(United States) Gary Stewart	1
(United States) SK Group Motorsports	Ford Mustang Cobra (Riley & Scott)	Ford V8	G	19	(United States) Andy Petery	1
(United States) SK Group Motorsports	Ford Mustang Cobra (Riley & Scott)	Ford V8	G	19	(United States) Craig Carter	1
(United States) SK Group Motorsports	Ford Mustang Cobra (Riley & Scott)	Ford V8	G	19	(United States) Les Delano	1
(United States) Rankin Racing	Chevrolet Camaro (Creative)	Chevrolet V8	H	40	(United States) Hank Scott	1
(United States) Rankin Racing	Chevrolet Camaro (Creative)	Chevrolet V8	H	40	(El Salvador) Toto Lasally	1
(United States) Rankin Racing	Chevrolet Camaro (Creative)	Chevrolet V8	H	40	(United States) C. Peter Pope	1
(United States) Rankin Racing	Chevrolet Camaro (Creative)	Chevrolet V8	H	40	(United States) David Rankin	1
(United States) Rankin Racing	Chevrolet Camaro (Creative)	Chevrolet V8	H	40	(United States) Richard McDill	1
(United States) Diablo Racing	Chevrolet Camaro (Watson)	Chevrolet V8	G	53	(United States) Tom Scheuren	1
(United States) Diablo Racing	Chevrolet Camaro (Watson)	Chevrolet V8	G	53	(United States) Mayo T. Smith	1
(United States) Diablo Racing	Chevrolet Camaro (Watson)	Chevrolet V8	G	53	(United States) John McNaughton	1
(United States) Diablo Racing	Chevrolet Camaro (Watson)	Chevrolet V8	G	53	(United States) John Halbing III	1
(United States) Diablo Racing	Chevrolet Camaro (Watson)	Chevrolet V8	G	53	(United States) Bobby Jones	1
(United States) Maugeri Motorsports	Chevrolet Camaro (Bemco)	Chevrolet V8	G	79	(United States) Richard Maugeri	1
(United States) Maugeri Motorsports	Chevrolet Camaro (Bemco)	Chevrolet V8	G	79	(United States) Anthony Puleo	1
(United States) Maugeri Motorsports	Chevrolet Camaro (Bemco)	Chevrolet V8	G	79	(United States) Sim Penton	1
(United States) Maugeri Motorsports	Chevrolet Camaro (Bemco)	Chevrolet V8	G	79	(Canada) Doug Mills	1
(United States) Maugeri Motorsports	Chevrolet Camaro (Bemco)	Chevrolet V8	G	79	(United States) Ron Zitza	1
(United States) John Annis	Chevrolet Camaro (Bemco)	Chevrolet V8	?	87	(United States) John Annis	1
(United States) John Annis	Chevrolet Camaro (Bemco)	Chevrolet V8	?	87	(United States) John Kohler	1
(United States) John Annis	Chevrolet Camaro (Bemco)	Chevrolet V8	?	87	(United States) Bill Ladoniczki	1
(United States) John Annis	Chevrolet Camaro (Bemco)	Chevrolet V8	?	87	(United States) Steve Ladoniczki	1
(United States) John Annis	Chevrolet Camaro (Bemco)	Chevrolet V8	?	87	(United States) Mark Kennedy	1
(United States) Entropy Racing	Chevrolet Camaro (Watson)	Chevrolet V8	G	96	(United States) Gerry Green	1
(United States) Entropy Racing	Chevrolet Camaro (Watson)	Chevrolet V8	G	96	(United States) Scott Brunk	1
(United States) Entropy Racing	Chevrolet Camaro (Watson)	Chevrolet V8	G	96	(United States) Rich Bell	1
(United States) Entropy Racing	Chevrolet Camaro (Watson)	Chevrolet V8	G	96	(United States) Keith Fisher	1
(United States) Entropy Racing	Chevrolet Camaro (Watson)	Chevrolet V8	G	96	(United States) Tony Tola	1

* Was on the entry list but did not participate in the event.

== Season results ==
Overall winners in bold.

Rnd	Circuit	CA Winning Team	GT2 Winning Team	GT3 Winning Team	Results
Rnd	Circuit	CA Winning Drivers	GT2 Winning Drivers	GT3 Winning Drivers	Results
1	Daytona	**(United States) #20 Dyson Racing**	(Germany) #83 Roock Racing	(United States) #23 Alex Job Racing	Results
1	Daytona	(United States) **Butch Leitzinger** (United States) **Elliott Forbes-Robinson** (United Kingdom) **Andy Wallace**	(Germany) André Ahrlé (Germany) Hubert Haupt (Italy) Raffaele Sangiuolo (United Kingdom) David Warnock	(United States) Kelly Collins (United States) Cort Wagner (United States) Anthony Lazzaro (United States) Darryl Havens	Results
2	Lime Rock	**(United States) #27 Doran Lista Ferrari**	(United States) #30 Mosler Automotive	(United States) #10 Prototype Technology Group	Results
2	Lime Rock	(Belgium) **Didier Theys** (Switzerland) **Fredy Lienhard, Sr.**	(Canada) Stéphane Roy (France) Loïc Depallier (Portugal) João Barbosa	(Germany) Hans-Joachim Stuck (United States) Boris Said	Results
3	Mid-Ohio	**(United States) #16 Dyson Racing**	(United States) #99 Schumacher Racing	(United States) #02 Reiser/Callas Rennsport	Results
3	Mid-Ohio	(United Kingdom) **James Weaver** (United Kingdom) **Andy Wallace**	(United States) Larry Schumacher (United States) John O'Steen	(United States) David Murry (United Kingdom) Johnny Mowlem	Results
