= 1999 Lime Rock Grand Prix =

Track map of Lime Rock Park.

The 1999 Lime Rock Grand Prix (formally known as the 1999 Dodge Dealers Grand Prix) was the second race of the 1999 United States Road Racing Championship season. It took place on May 31, 1999, at Lime Rock Park.

== Official results ==
Class winners in bold.

Pos	Class	No	Team	Drivers	Chassis	Tyre	Laps
Pos	Class	No	Team	Drivers	Engine	Tyre	Laps
1	**CA**	**27**	**(United States) Doran Lista Ferrari**	**(Switzerland) Fredy Lienhard Sr.** **(Belgium) Didier Theys**	**Ferrari 333 SP**	**MI**	**143**
1	**CA**	**27**	**(United States) Doran Lista Ferrari**	**(Switzerland) Fredy Lienhard Sr.** **(Belgium) Didier Theys**	**Ferrari F310E 4.0L V12**	**MI**	**143**
2	CA	20	(United States) Dyson Racing	(United States) Elliot Forbes-Robinson (United States) Rob Dyson (United States) Butch Leitzinger	Riley & Scott Mk III	**G**	143
2	CA	20	(United States) Dyson Racing	(United States) Elliot Forbes-Robinson (United States) Rob Dyson (United States) Butch Leitzinger	Ford 5.0 L V8	**G**	143
3	CA	8	(United States) Supportnet Racing	(United States) Henry Camferdam (United States) Scott Schubot	Riley & Scott Mk III	**G**	141
3	CA	8	(United States) Supportnet Racing	(United States) Henry Camferdam (United States) Scott Schubot	Ford 5.0 L V8	**G**	141
4	CA	16	(United States) Dyson Racing	(United Kingdom) Andy Wallace (United Kingdom) James Weaver	Riley & Scott Mk III	**G**	136
4	CA	16	(United States) Dyson Racing	(United Kingdom) Andy Wallace (United Kingdom) James Weaver	Ford 5.0L V8	**G**	136
5	CA	28	(United States) Intersport Racing	(United States) Jon Field (Sweden) Niclas Jönsson	Lola B98/10	**G**	133
5	CA	28	(United States) Intersport Racing	(United States) Jon Field (Sweden) Niclas Jönsson	Ford 5.0 L V8	**G**	133
6	**GT2**	**30**	**(United States) Mosler Automotive**	**(France) Loic Depailler** **(Canada) Stephane Roy** **(Portugal) João Barbosa**	**Mosler Intruder**	?	**131**
6	**GT2**	**30**	**(United States) Mosler Automotive**	**(France) Loic Depailler** **(Canada) Stephane Roy** **(Portugal) João Barbosa**	**Chevrolet 5.7 L V8**	?	**131**
7	**GT3**	**10**	**(United States) Prototype Technology Group**	**(United States) Boris Said** **(Germany) Hans-Joachim Stuck**	**BMW M3**	**Y**	**131**
7	**GT3**	**10**	**(United States) Prototype Technology Group**	**(United States) Boris Said** **(Germany) Hans-Joachim Stuck**	**BMW 3.2 L I6**	**Y**	**131**
8	GT3	6	(United States) Prototype Technology Group	(United States) Peter Cunningham (United States) Mark Simo	BMW M3	**Y**	131
8	GT3	6	(United States) Prototype Technology Group	(United States) Peter Cunningham (United States) Mark Simo	BMW 3.2 L I6	**Y**	131
9	GT3	7	(United States) Prototype Technology Group	(United States) Johannes Van Overbeek (United States) Brian Cunningham	BMW M3	**Y**	130
9	GT3	7	(United States) Prototype Technology Group	(United States) Johannes Van Overbeek (United States) Brian Cunningham	BMW 3.2 L I6	**Y**	130
10	GT2	83	(United States) Ross Racing	(United States) Michael Schrom (United States) Stephen Earle	Porsche 911 GT2	?	128
10	GT2	83	(United States) Ross Racing	(United States) Michael Schrom (United States) Stephen Earle	Porsche 3.6 L Turbo Flat-6	?	128
11	GT3	51	(United States) Aspen Knolls Racing	(United States) Shane Lewis (United States) Bob Mazzuoccola	BMW M3	**Y**	126
11	GT3	51	(United States) Aspen Knolls Racing	(United States) Shane Lewis (United States) Bob Mazzuoccola	BMW 3.2 L I6	**Y**	126
12	GT3	90	(United States) Millennium Motorsports	(United States) David Friedman (United States) Cort Wagner	Porsche 911 Carrera RSR	**Y**	125
12	GT3	90	(United States) Millennium Motorsports	(United States) David Friedman (United States) Cort Wagner	Porsche 3.8 L Flat-6	**Y**	125
13	GT3	64	(United States) Spencer Pumpelly Racing	(United States) Spencer Pumpelly (United States) Josh Rehm	Porsche 911 Carrera RSR	?	124
13	GT3	64	(United States) Spencer Pumpelly Racing	(United States) Spencer Pumpelly (United States) Josh Rehm	Porsche 3.8 L Flat-6	?	124
14	GT3	61	(United States) Paragon Motorsports	(United States) Keith Fisher (United States) Scott Brunk	Porsche 964 Cup	**P**	124
14	GT3	61	(United States) Paragon Motorsports	(United States) Keith Fisher (United States) Scott Brunk	Porsche 3.6 L Flat-6	**P**	124
15	GT3	01	(United States) Greycliff/Netts Racing	(United States) Mark Greenberg (United States) John Drew	Porsche 911 Carrera RSR	?	121
15	GT3	01	(United States) Greycliff/Netts Racing	(United States) Mark Greenberg (United States) John Drew	Porsche 3.8 L Flat-6	?	121
16	GT3	08	(United States) G&W Motorsports	(United States) Steve Marshall (United States) Cort Wagner	Porsche 911 Carrera Cup	**D**	121
16	GT3	08	(United States) G&W Motorsports	(United States) Steve Marshall (United States) Cort Wagner	Porsche 3.8 L Flat-6	**D**	121
17	CA	63	(United States) Downing/Atlanta	(United States) Howard Katz (United States) Jim Downing	Kudzu DLY	**G**	120
17	CA	63	(United States) Downing/Atlanta	(United States) Howard Katz (United States) Jim Downing	Mazda R26B 2.6 L 4-Rotor	**G**	120
18	GT3	71	(United States) Dura Motorsports	(United Kingdom) Michael DeFontes (United States) Chris Thompson	Chevrolet Camaro	?	119
18	GT3	71	(United States) Dura Motorsports	(United Kingdom) Michael DeFontes (United States) Chris Thompson	Chevrolet 5.7 L V8	?	119
19	GT3	57	(United States) Kryderacing	(United States) Reed Kryder (United States) John Steinmetz	Nissan 240SX	**G**	116
19	GT3	57	(United States) Kryderacing	(United States) Reed Kryder (United States) John Steinmetz	Nissan ? L V6	**G**	116
20	GT2	80	(United States) Extreme Motor Racing	(United States) Glenn Seward (United States) David Galpin (United States) Dean K. Clark	Chevrolet Corvette	?	114
20	GT2	80	(United States) Extreme Motor Racing	(United States) Glenn Seward (United States) David Galpin (United States) Dean K. Clark	Chevrolet 5.7 L V8	?	114
21	GT2	4	(United States) SSZ Motorcars	(United States) John Engel (United States) Mark Knepper	SSZ Stradale Mk III	?	98
21	GT2	4	(United States) SSZ Motorcars	(United States) John Engel (United States) Mark Knepper	Nissan 3.0L Turbo V6	?	98
22 DNF	CA	92	(United States) Executive Auto Sport	(United States) A.J. Smith (United States) Gerry Green	Kudzu DLM	?	38
22 DNF	CA	92	(United States) Executive Auto Sport	(United States) A.J. Smith (United States) Gerry Green	Buick 4.5 L V6	?	38
23 DNF	CA	36	(United States) Matthews-Colucci Racing	(United States) Jim Matthews	Ferrari 333 SP	**MI**	4
23 DNF	CA	36	(United States) Matthews-Colucci Racing	(United States) Jim Matthews	Ferrari F310E 4.0L V12	**MI**	4
24 DNF	CA	29	(United States) Intersport Racing	(United States) Sam Brown	Riley & Scott Mk III	**G**	1
24 DNF	CA	29	(United States) Intersport Racing	(United States) Sam Brown	Ford 5.0 L V8	**G**	1
25 DNS	GT3	3	(United States) Toad Hall Motor Racing	(United States) Peter Kitchak	Porsche 911 Carrera RSR	?	0
25 DNS	GT3	3	(United States) Toad Hall Motor Racing	(United States) Peter Kitchak	Porsche 3.8 L Flat-6	?	0
26 DNS	CA	17	(United States) Jacobs Motorsports Ltd.	(United States) Michael Jacobs (Canada) Jacek Mucha (United States) Frank Del Vecchio	Courage C41	?	0
26 DNS	CA	17	(United States) Jacobs Motorsports Ltd.	(United States) Michael Jacobs (Canada) Jacek Mucha (United States) Frank Del Vecchio	Chevrolet 5.0 L V8	?	0

=== Statistics ===
- Pole Position - #16 Dyson Racing - 0:50.130
- Fastest lap - #16 Dyson Racing - 0:51.263
- Average Speed - 97.677 mph
