= SSZ Stradale =

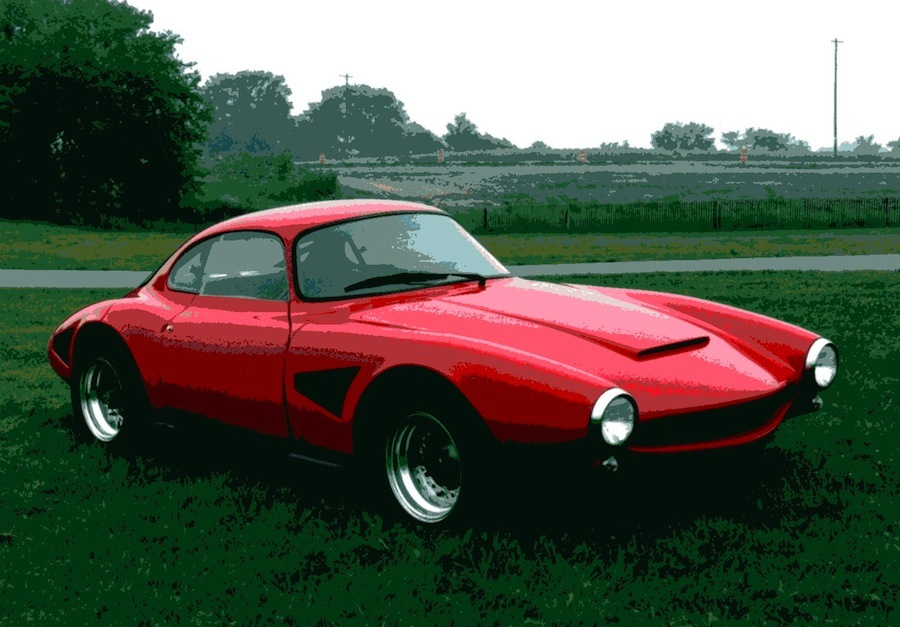
- Stradale Mark 1 street version in 1993

Overview
- Production: 1984-1999

Body and chassis
- Body style: 2-door coupe
- Layout: FR Layout

The SSZ Stradale is an automobile developed by Tom Zatloukal, an Alfa Romeo racer and restorer, that was produced between 1984 and 1999. SSZ stands for Sprint Speciale Zatloukal. Based on the Giulietta SS, the aim was to produce a high-performance version with a lightweight and wider body than the standard production SS.

The original intent had been to produce a one-off vehicle for personal use. The car was well received at Alfa club events and Alfa historian Pat Braden nicknamed the car "The Zatmobile" and published photos in Alfa Owner magazine. A second car was built for Joe Benson, author of the Alfa Romeo Buyers Guide. After several other customers expressed interest in purchasing a car, SSZ Motorcars was formed.

== Prototypes ==
A total of four prototypes were produced on Alfa 101 Sprint Speciale chassis. SSZ P1 has a steel body that is 3 inches (76 mm) wider and 4 inches (100 mm) lower than a standard SS, with a traditional hood and trunk. P2 incorporated a one-piece, fiberglass tilt front, perplex windows, and other lightweight components. The third prototype had tilt front and rear, side air outlets, a new taillight configuration, and an elongated greenhouse. The P4 added a hood scoop, wider wheel wells, and a mono wiper. Only P1 and P2 still exist as the P3 was destroyed during testing and the P4 was disassembled to pattern parts for production cars.

== Mark 1 ==
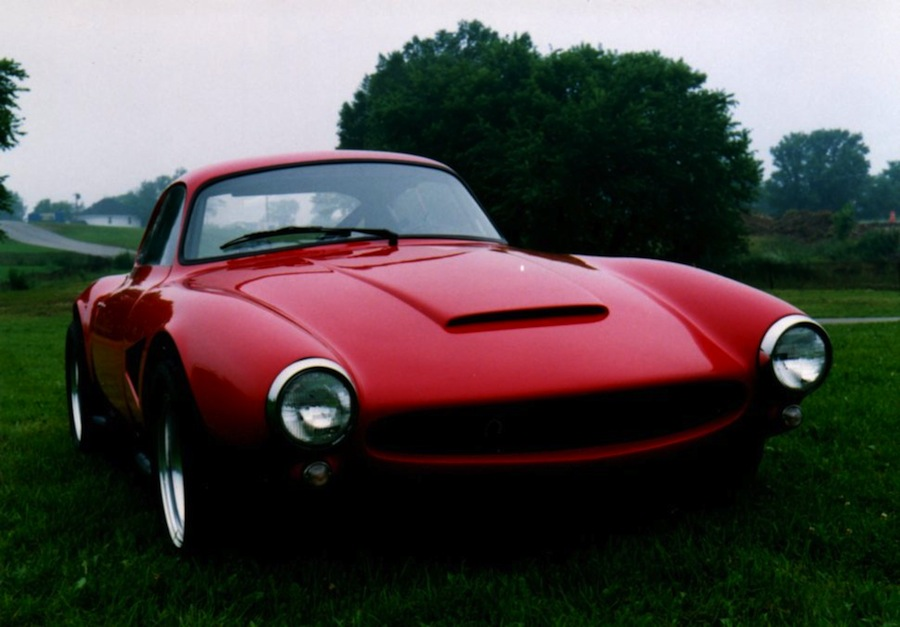
SSZ Stradale Mark 1

The first production SSZ Stradale featured an all-new tubular chassis combined with a Kevlar-reinforced fiberglass body. These cars were powered by an Alfa Romeo 3.0 L V6 engine with a 5-speed overdrive transmission coupled to an adjustable ratio live axle. Standard features included four-wheel 12-inch driver-adjustable brakes, adjustable coil-over suspension, rack and pinion steering, front and rear adjustable sway bars, fuel cell, and a fire system.

== Mark 2 ==
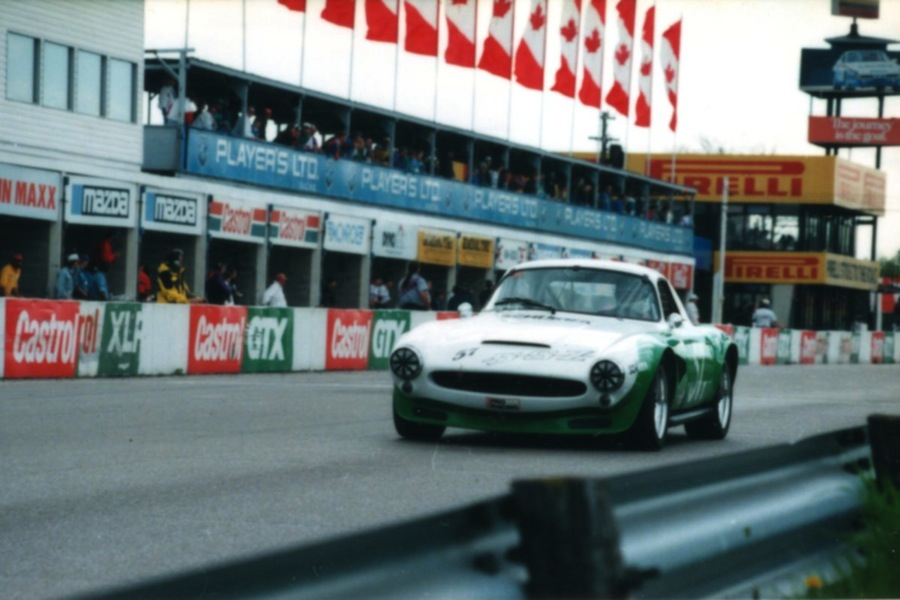
SSZ Stradale Mark 2 as raced on May 21, 1995 at MoSport

Although the chassis and suspension were the same, as the Mark 1 cars, the power was increased to over 500 hp (373 kW) by utilizing a Nissan 3.0 L, four-valve, turbocharged engine. The transmission and rear axle were also upgraded. The body was widened, a front spoiler was added and a new rear clip was incorporated to increase downforce. Five Mark 2 cars are known to have been produced.

== Mark 3 ==
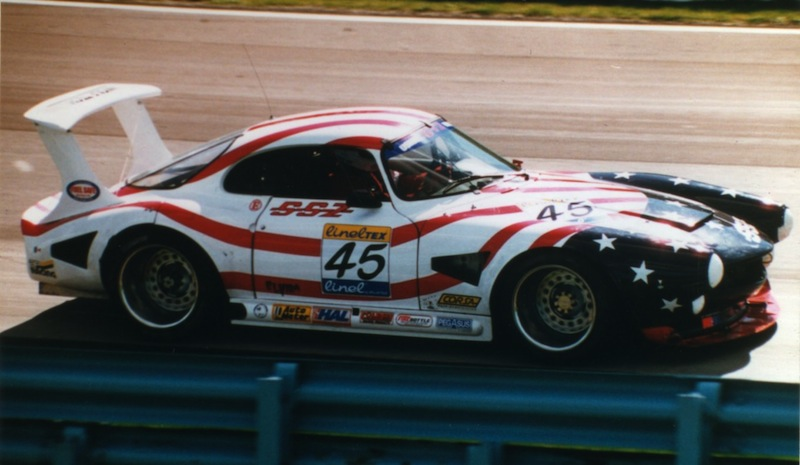
SSZ Stradale Mark 3 as raced at Elkhart Lake, Road America on October 2, 1999

Mark 3 cars were prepared in competition version only. The Electromotive 3.0 L twin-turbo engine developed 1,000 hp (746 kW; 1,014 PS). The cars had independent rear suspension and inboard disc brakes. A full flat bottom with a rear diffuser, air jacks, telemetry, and data acquisition were fitted. The body was wider, longer, and delivered with adjustable front and rear wings. It weighed 2,000 lb (907 kg) in FIA GT2 trim.

== Mark 3.1 ==
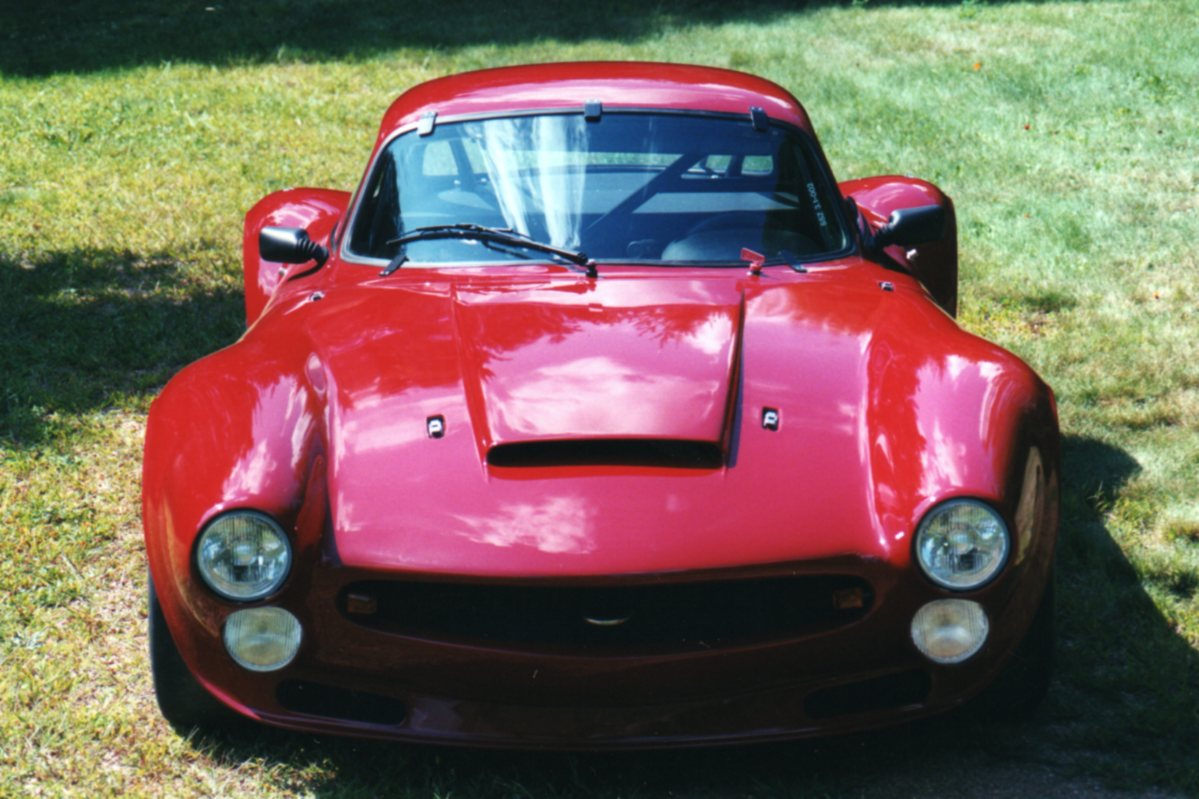
Mark 3, street version

Mark 3.1 cars had the same chassis and body as the 3.0 sans wings. The engines were Chevrolet LS6 aluminum V8s coupled to a Richmond 5-speed. The wheels were changed to a traditional 5-bolt pattern. Like the 3.0, the cars were sold for competition purposes and were available without an engine. Several cars have been converted to street use.

== Mark 4 ==
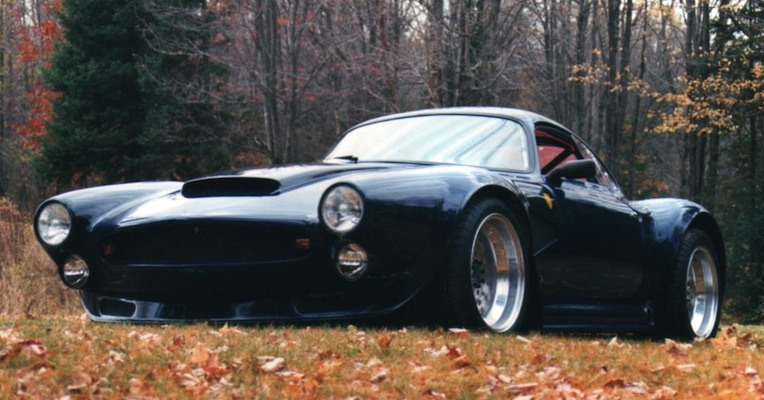
SSZ Stradale Mark 4, street version

These cars were mechanically the same as the 3.1. The body and chassis were 4 inches (100 mm) longer for high-speed stability. Racing development was discontinued at the end of the 1999 season due to upheaval within the sanctioning bodies.

== Racing ==
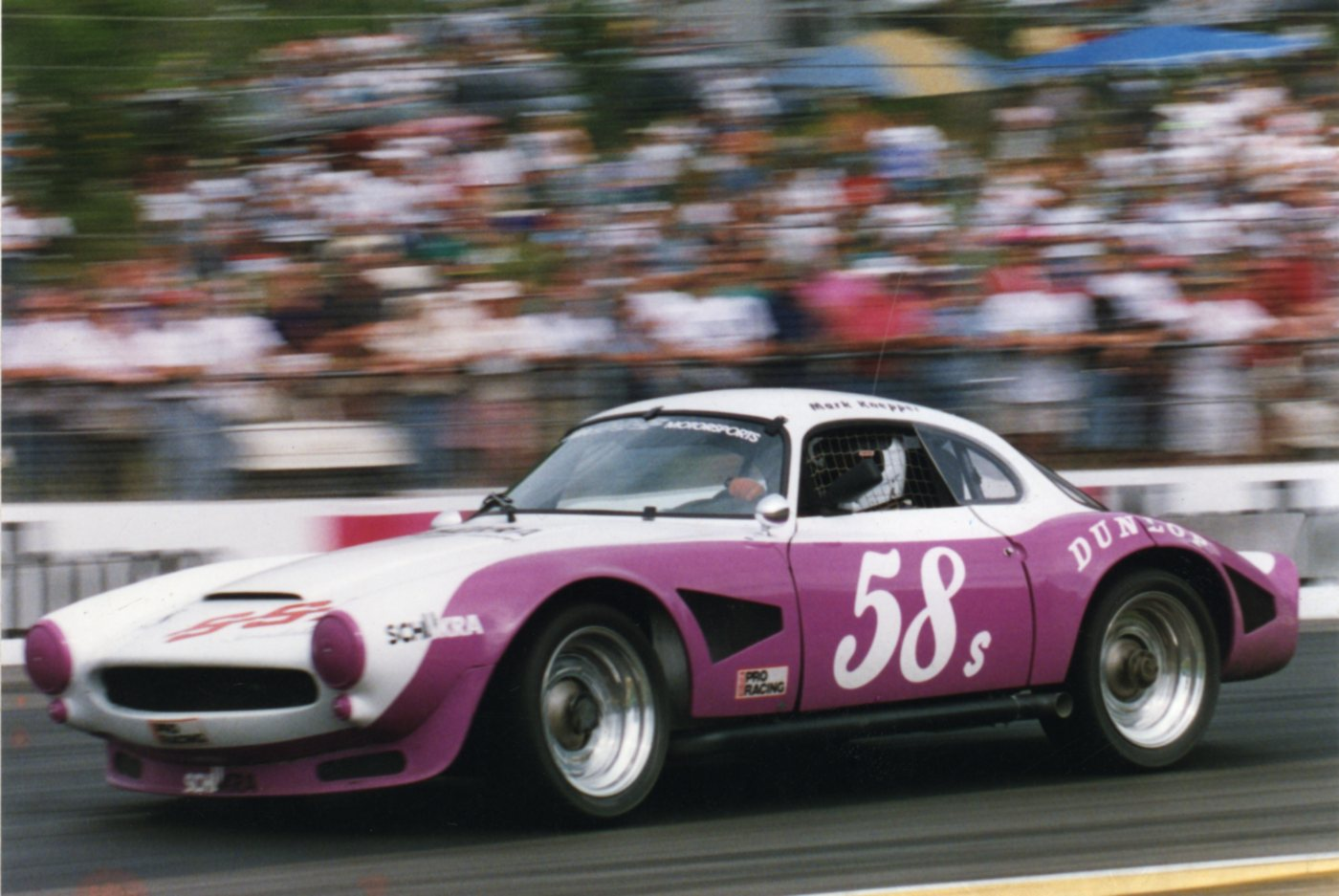
A Mark 2 racing in July 1995

Stradales were campaigned in SCCA, USRRC, FIA GT, World Challenge, and Sports Car. Mark 1 and 2 cars won numerous events in SCCA club racing including the Continental Challenge and 5 track records. Elvira, the first Mk 3 auto, set three track records, had seven wins, and placed fifth in the United States Road Racing Championship. The Stradale competed in oval track, drag race, rally racing, and hill climb events with success.

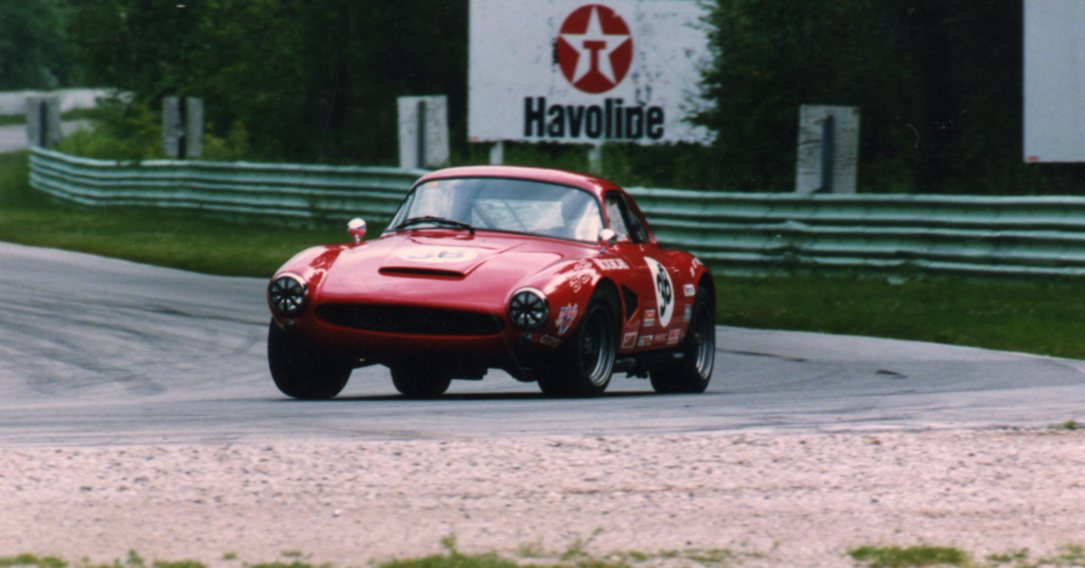
Mark 1, Phil Hill autographed car, raced at Elkhart Lake's Road America on August 20, 1993

== Production Stats ==
Years produced: 1984 - 1999

Model	Number made	Engine	Dimensions
Prototypes	4	Alfa 1.6 liter	
Mark 1	6	Alfa 3.0 liter	Weight 1,850 lb (840 kg) Length 165 in (4,191 mm) Width 64.5 in (1,638 mm) Height 49 in (1,245 mm)
Mark 2	5	Nissan 3.0 liter	Weight 2,150 lb (980 kg) Length 168 in (4,267 mm) Width 67 in (1,702 mm) Height 47.5 in (1,206 mm)
Mark 3	3	Electromotive 3.0 liter	Weight 2,200 lb (1,000 kg) Length 170 in (4,318 mm) Width 72.5 in (1,842 mm) Height 46.5 in (1,181 mm)
Mark 3.1	8	Chevrolet 5.7 liter	Weight 2,200 lb (1,000 kg) Length 170 in (4,318 mm) Width 72.5 in (1,842 mm) Height 46.5 in (1,181 mm)
Mark 4	2	Chevrolet 5.7 liter	Weight 2,200 lb (1,000 kg) Length 174 in (4,420 mm) Width 72.5 in (1,842 mm) Height 46.5 in (1,181 mm)

The SSZ is no longer being produced. The Motorama Auto Museum in Wisconsin features over fifty vintage Alfa Romeos, several SSZ Stradales, prototypes, and other cars from around the world.
