= Chevrolet Camaro (fourth generation) =

Motor vehicle

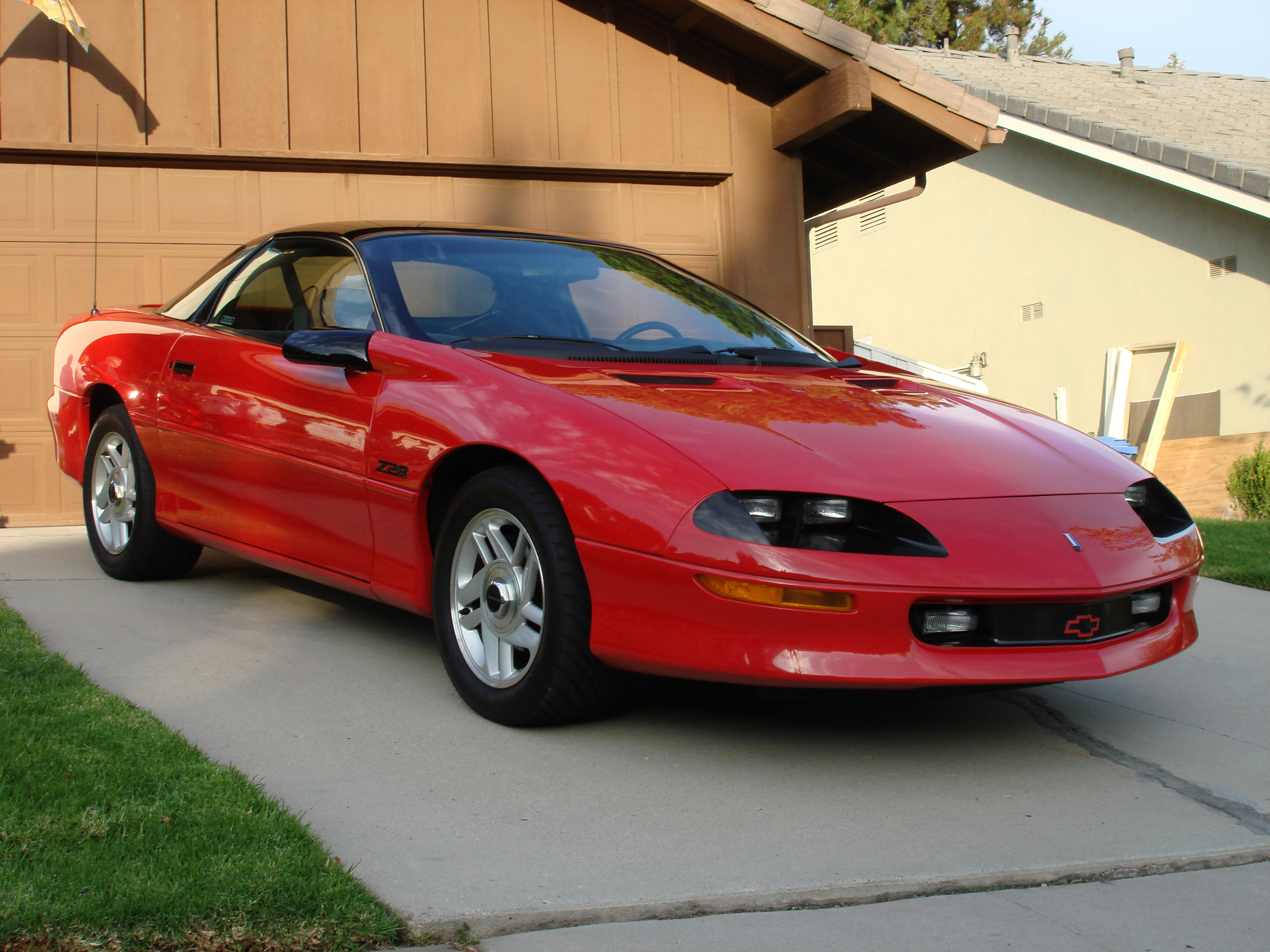
- 1993 Chevrolet Camaro Z28

Overview
- Manufacturer: Chevrolet (General Motors)
- Production: November 1992 – August 27, 2002
- Model years: 1993–2002
- Assembly: Canada: Sainte-Thérèse, Quebec (Sainte-Thérèse Assembly)
- Designer: John Cafaro; Chuck Jordan (1989)

Body and chassis
- Class: Pony car; Muscle car
- Body style: 2-door t-top; 2-door liftback coupé; 2-door convertible
- Layout: Front-engine, rear-wheel drive
- Platform: F-body
- Related: Pontiac Firebird (fourth generation); Callaway SuperNatural Camaro

Powertrain
- Engine: 207 cu in (3.4 L) L32 V6 (160 hp); 231 cu in (3.8 L) L36 V6 (205 hp); 350 cu in (5.7 L) LT1 V8 (275-305 hp); 350 cu in (5.7 L) LT4 V8 (330 hp); 346 cu in (5.7 L) LS1 V8 (305-330 hp)
- Transmission: 4-speed automatic; 5-speed manual; 6-speed manual

Dimensions
- Wheelbase: 101.1 in (2,568 mm)
- Length: 1998–2002: 193.5 in (4,915 mm); 1993–1997: 193.2 in (4,907 mm)
- Width: 74.1 in (1,882 mm)
- Height: 1998–2002 convertible: 51.8 in (1,316 mm); 1998–2002 coupe: 51.2 in (1,300 mm); 1994–1997 convertible: 52.0 in (1,321 mm); 1993–1997 coupe: 51.3 in (1,303 mm)
- Curb weight: 2,954–3,211 lb (1,340–1,456 kg)

Chronology
- Predecessor: Chevrolet Camaro (third generation)
- Successor: Chevrolet Camaro (fifth generation)

The fourth-generation Chevrolet Camaro is a pony car that was produced by American automobile manufacturer General Motors for the 1993 through 2002 model years. It was introduced on an updated F-body platform but retained characteristics of the first-generation car introduced in 1967: two doors, coupe or convertible bodystyles, rear-wheel drive, and a choice of 6-cylinder and V8 engines. The Camaro was revised in 1998 with both exterior and engine changes. General Motors discontinued production of the fourth generation of the Camaro due to slow sales, a deteriorated sports coupé market, and plant overcapacity.

== 1993–1997 ==
=== 1993 ===
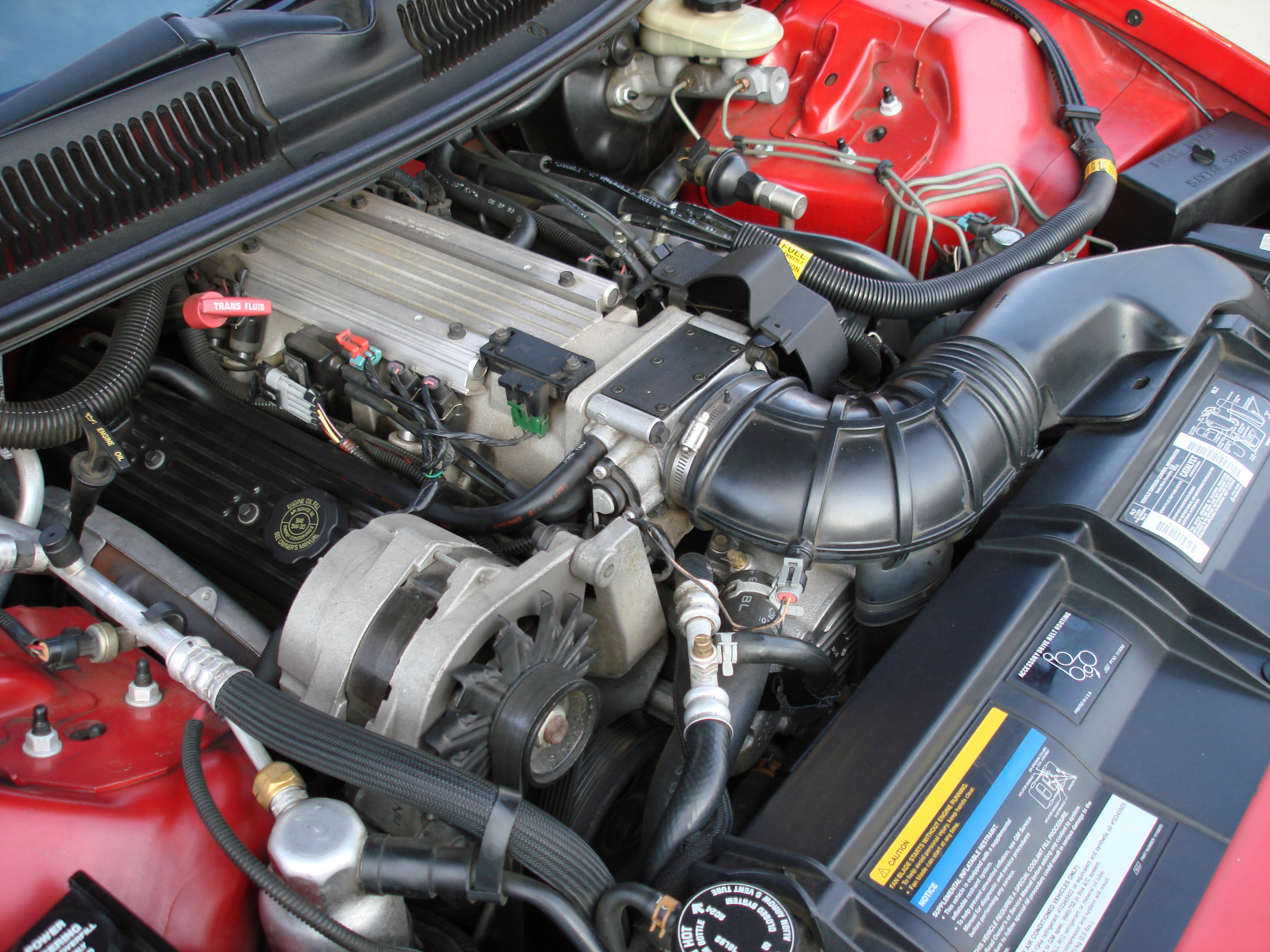
The 5.7-liter LT1 V8 engine

The fourth generation of the Camaro was introduced in January 1993, as a 1993 model. The production was moved from GM's Van Nuys, California assembly plant to Sainte-Thérèse, Quebec, Canada from November 1992. The new design incorporated sheet moulding compound (SMC) made from chopped fiberglass and polyester resin for the roof, hatch, doors, and spoiler. Both the front and rear suspension design was improved over its predecessor. The base models were powered by a 160 hp (119 kW) 3.4 L OHV V6 engine equipped with a 5-speed manual transmission as standard. The 4-speed 4L60 automatic transmission was optional. All models came with a red Chevrolet Bowtie on the grille. 1993 was the only year interior instruments had yellow lettering (this is one way to tell the 1993 models from the 1994 which had white interior instrument lettering).

==== Z/28 ====
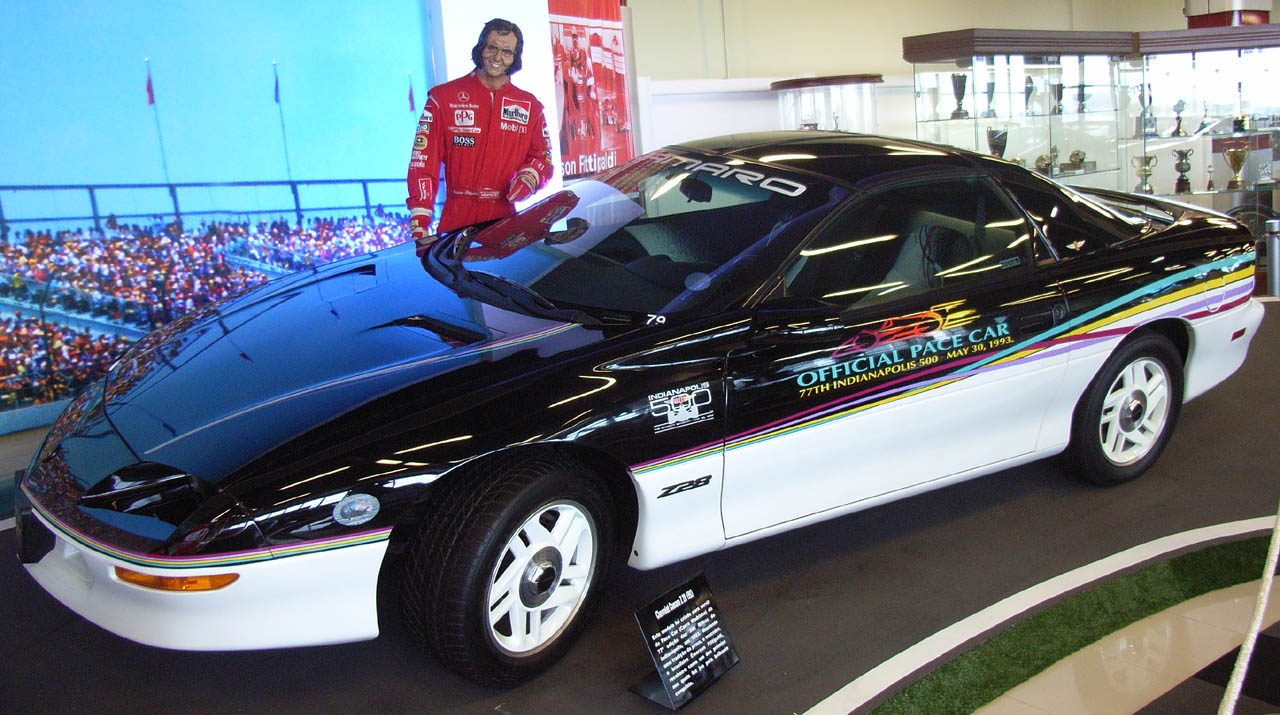
1993 Camaro Z/28 Indianapolis 500 pace car

The high performance Z/28 model came with rectangular dual exhaust tips to distinguish it from the base models. The Z/28 featured the 5.7 L OHV LT1 V8 engine rated at 275 hp (205 kW) and 325 lb⋅ft (441 N⋅m) of torque that had been introduced on the Corvette one year earlier. The V8 engine came standard with a four-speed (4L60) automatic transmission with the Borg-Warner T56 6-speed manual transmission was a no cost option. In 1993, the Camaro Z/28 was selected as the official pace car for the Indianapolis 500. A special "pace car edition" trim was introduced in the same year and featured 'Indy 500' lettering on black and white body color scheme with multicolored pinstriping and white painted wheels. A total of 645 pace car editions were made.

=== 1994 ===
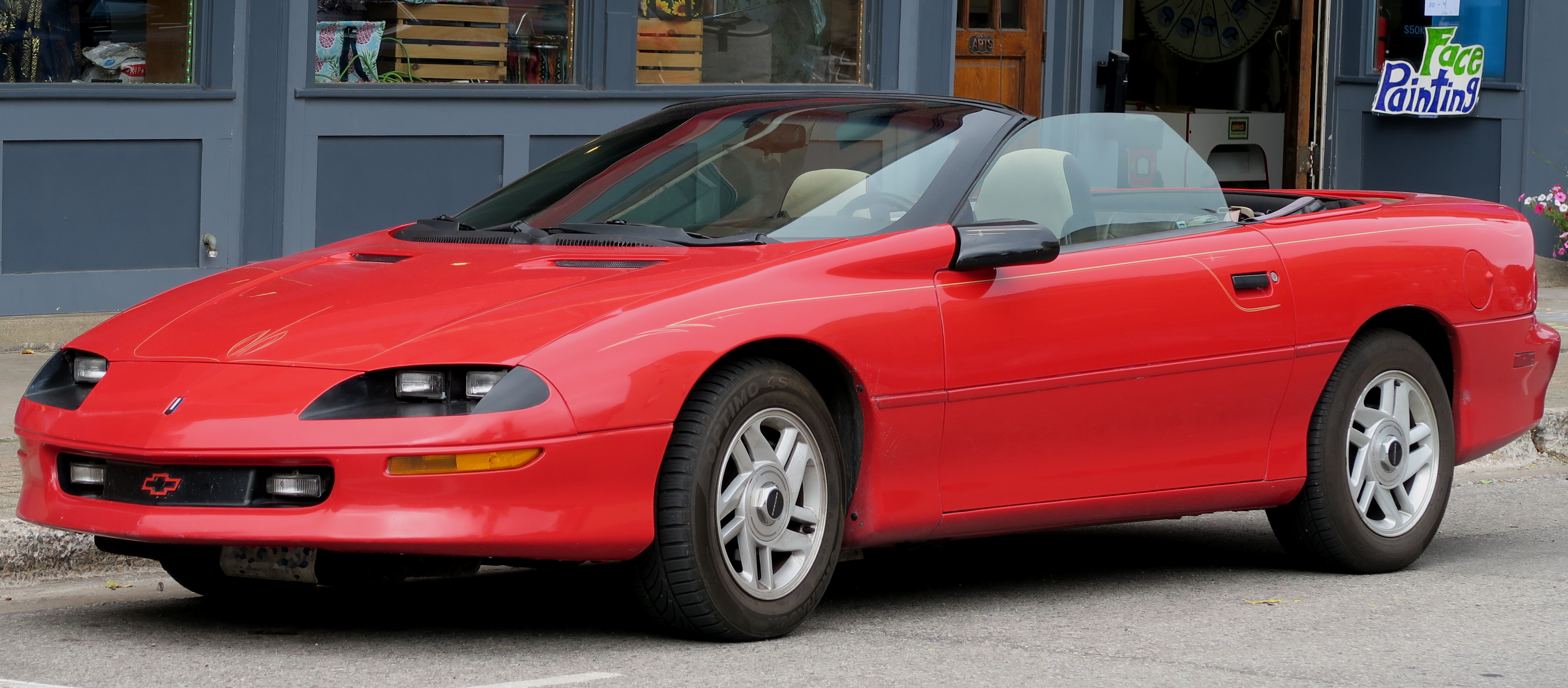
1994 Chevrolet Camaro convertible

The 1994 model year saw the mechanically controlled and operated 4L60 automatic transmission replaced with the electronically operated and controlled 4L60E, which was shared with other GM vehicles with V8s, such as the Tahoe. The on-board computer was modified from dealing only with the engine as in 1993 (ECM), to controlling both the engine and transmission on automatic models (PCM).

The computer in 1993 was run via Speed Density system, which measured engine speed (RPM) and load (MAP in kPa) to compute airflow requirements and then use that against the VE (Volumetric Efficiency) table to closely estimate the amount of fuel to be injected. An Intake Air Temperature (IAT) sensor was also used, as air density changes with temperature. In 1994 however, the computer logic was changed to a Mass Air Flow system. This system uses a Mass Air Flow Sensor placed in front of the throttle body to measure incoming airflow into the motor by using a heated wire sensor in the airstream path, which has heat pulled away from it via the incoming air. The reduced heat is converted into a voltage signal, read by the PCM which interprets that voltage signal as mass flow. The computer uses engine sensors to judge engine conditions and provide the proper fueling off of this mass airflow reading. Another prominent difference between 1993 and 1994 systems is how the programming (or custom tuning) of the computer takes place. In 1993, the computer used a removable Memcal chip essential to run the systems. In 1994, this was swapped to a non-removable reflashable chip, which could be reprogrammed via the Assembly Line Diagnostic Link (ALDL) located underneath the driver's side of the dashboard, next to the center console.

Dashboard gauge graphics were changed from yellow to white. There was also a spot in the gauge cluster reading ASR off. Although GM had intended to install ASR or Acceleration Slip Regulation (called "TCS" by Pontiac) in the 1994 F-body models, it did not make it into production until the following model year. The Z28 received updated front brakes and cooling fans were changed mid-year from a parallel to a series setup. At low RPM, both fans operated on 6 V, but on high RPM, both operated on 12 V. Performance figures for the Z28 include a 0–60 mph acceleration time of 5.7 seconds and quarter-mile times of 14.2 seconds.

=== 1995 ===
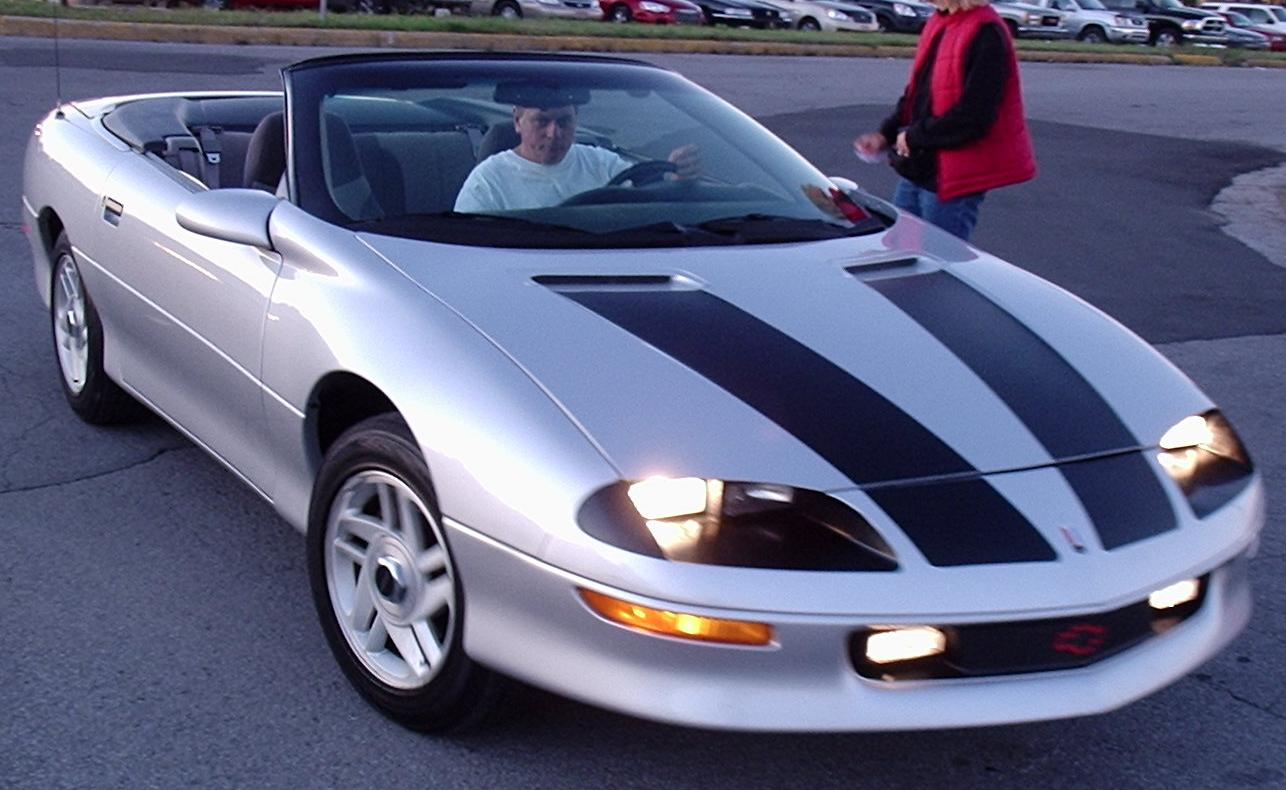
1995 Camaro convertible

In 1995, the 3800 Series II V6 engine joined the 3.4-liter V6 engine offered on the base models thus giving the buyers a choice of two V6 engines for the first time. The 3800 engine had a power output of 200 hp (149 kW) and would eventually replace the 3.4-liter V6 engine. The LT1 V8 had a power output of 275 hp (205 kW). Optional were 17-inch wheels.

=== 1996 ===
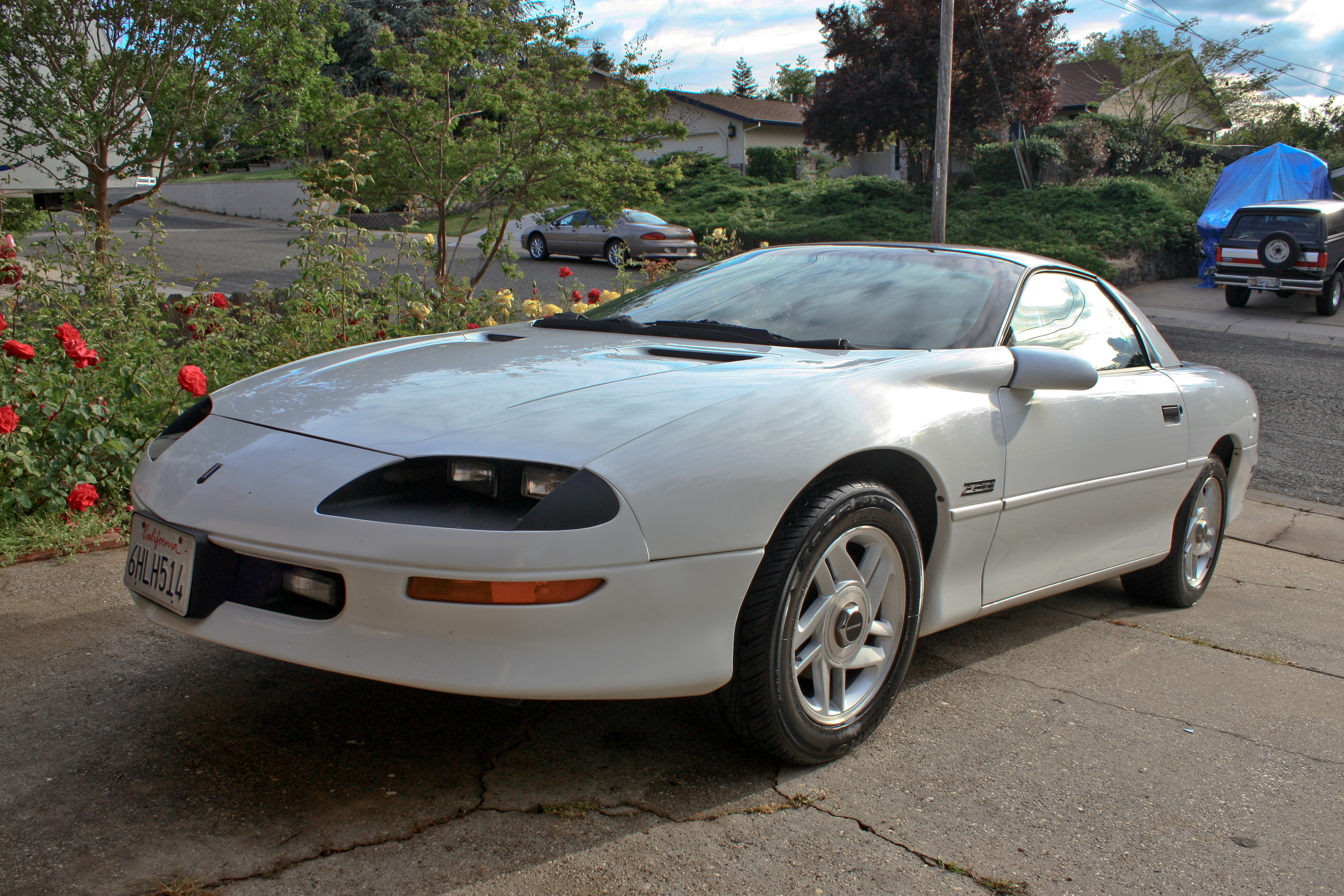
1996 Chevrolet Camaro Z28

The 1996 model year saw minor mechanical revisions and small power gains from the new OBD II-compliant engine controls. All base models were now equipped with the 3800 series II V6 engine rated at 200 hp. Convertible Super Sport cars included 16-inch ZR-1 style wheels, while the 17-inch ZR1-style SS wheels were available on the other SS Camaros. The V6 model had an optional Y87 package that included an Auburn limited-slip differential, better tires, dual exhaust tips, four-wheel disc brakes, a sportier steering ratio, and more aggressive gear ratio in the differential for automatic transmission equipped cars. The high performance variant of the Z28 called the Z28 SS was introduced in collaboration with SLP Engineering with the engine rated at 305 hp (227 kW).

=== 1997 ===
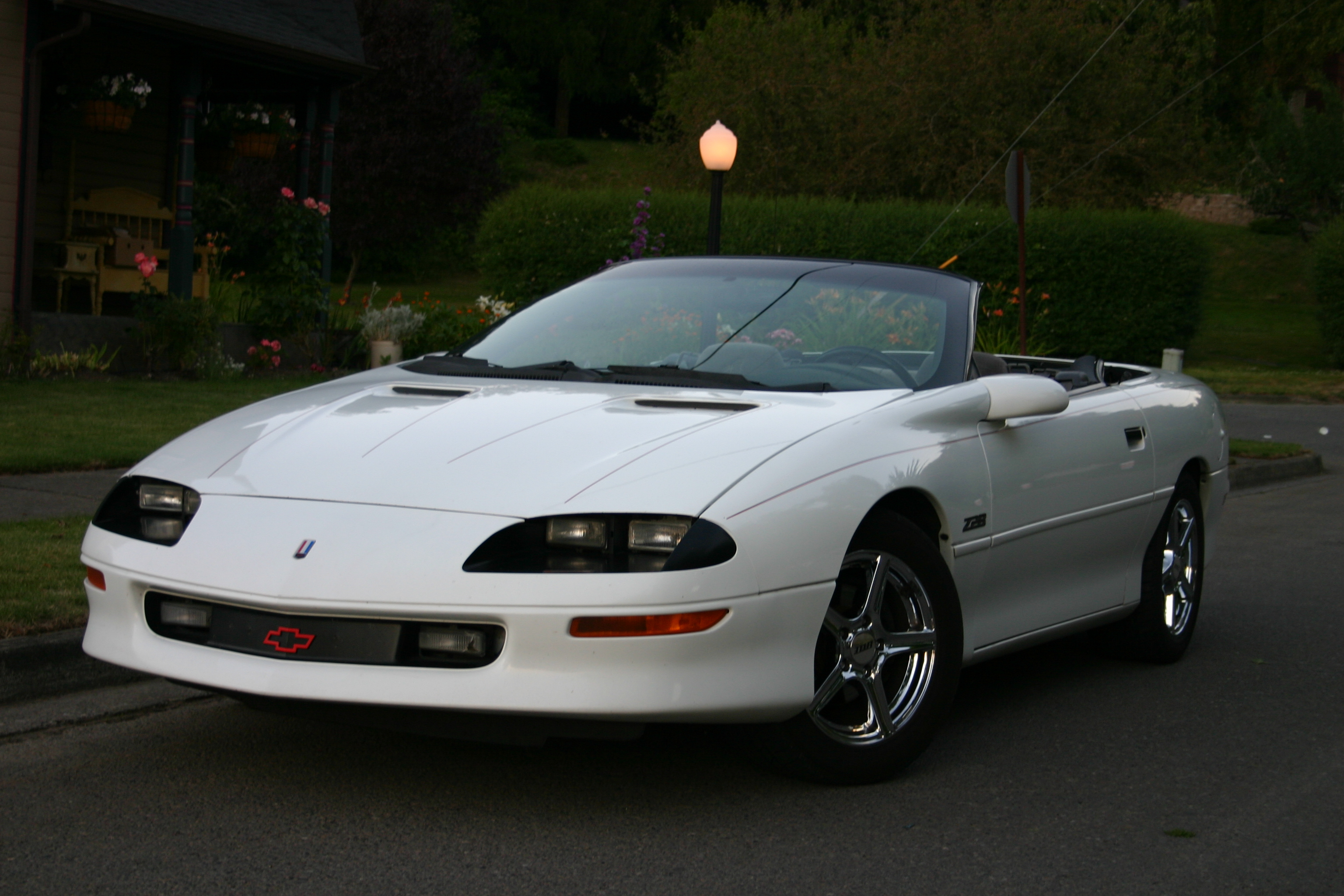
1997 Camaro Z28 convertible

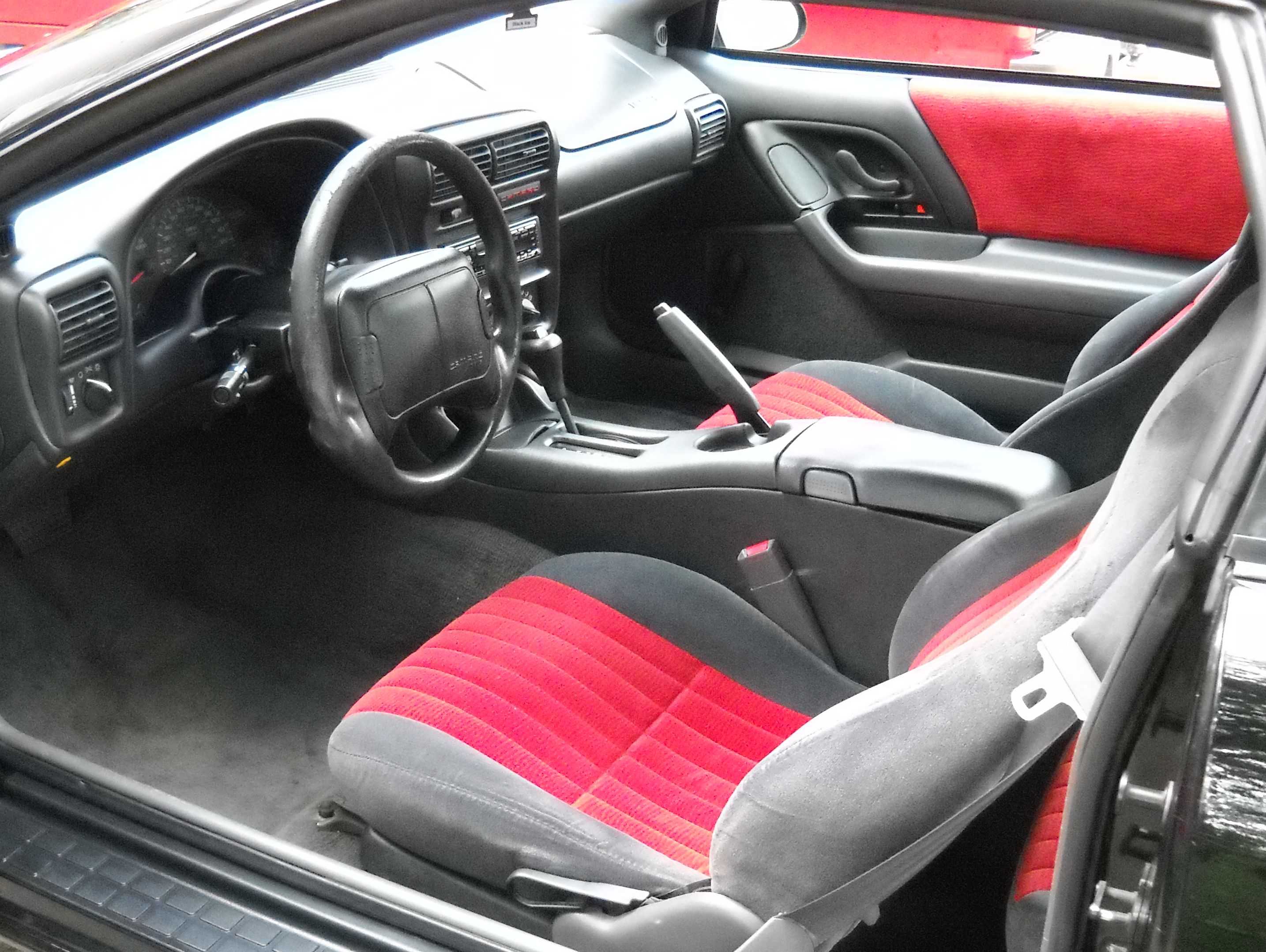
1997 Camaro interior

For the 1997 model year, the Camaro featured a new interior and tri-colored taillights that would be standard on all models from 1997 to 2002. A "30th Anniversary Limited Edition" trim package, commemorating 30 years since the Camaro was introduced, was added to the range which included unique orange stripes on white base paint. It was only available on the Z28, SS, and RS models. A 30th Anniversary Camaro is identified by RPO code Z4C on the trim tag. A total of 979 30th Anniversary models were made in 1997. New five-spoke 16-inch wheels became standard on the Z28 this year (17-inch ZR-1 style on SS coupé models) available in either polished, chrome, or white (only on the 30th Anniversary models), replacing the previous ten-spoke turbine style design.

==== 30th Anniversary LT4 SS ====
An additional 108 30th Anniversary models were modified by SLP Engineering equipment with the LT4 V8 engine having a power output of 330 hp (246 kW) and 340 lb⋅ft (461 N⋅m) of torque. One hundred cars were allocated to the US market while six cars were sold to Canadian buyers. The remaining two were prototypes. These models have the R7T RPO code. The LT4 was the fastest factory-built Camaro available, as well as the most expensive at US$40,000.

== 1998–2002 ==
=== 1998 ===
For the 1998 model year, the Camaro received a facelift and now had a new front clip. This replaced the quartet of square inset headlights. Because of the visual changes, this iteration of the fourth-generation Camaro is colloquially known as the "Catfish Camaro". Replacing the LT1 engine was the all-new 5.67 L (346 cu in) LS1 V8 engine introduced a year prior in the 1997 Corvette, generating 350 hp (261 kW) at the flywheel but marketed as 310 hp (231 kW) in the Camaro as to not deter sales from the Corvette. The new engine featured an aluminum cylinder block with iron sleeves, reducing weight by about 95 lb (43 kg) as compared to the iron block LT1 engine. The changes made to the LS1 compared to the Corvette were the relocation of drive belt accessories to accommodate the Camaro’s engine bay, an oil pan tailored to the F-body, as well as opting for a cable-actuated throttle body, as opposed to the Corvette’s drive-by-wire. 1998 was the only year LS1 powered models had a working coolant temperature gauge. Minor changes were made to the suspension and the brakes were increased in size. Total production for 1998 was 48,495 units.

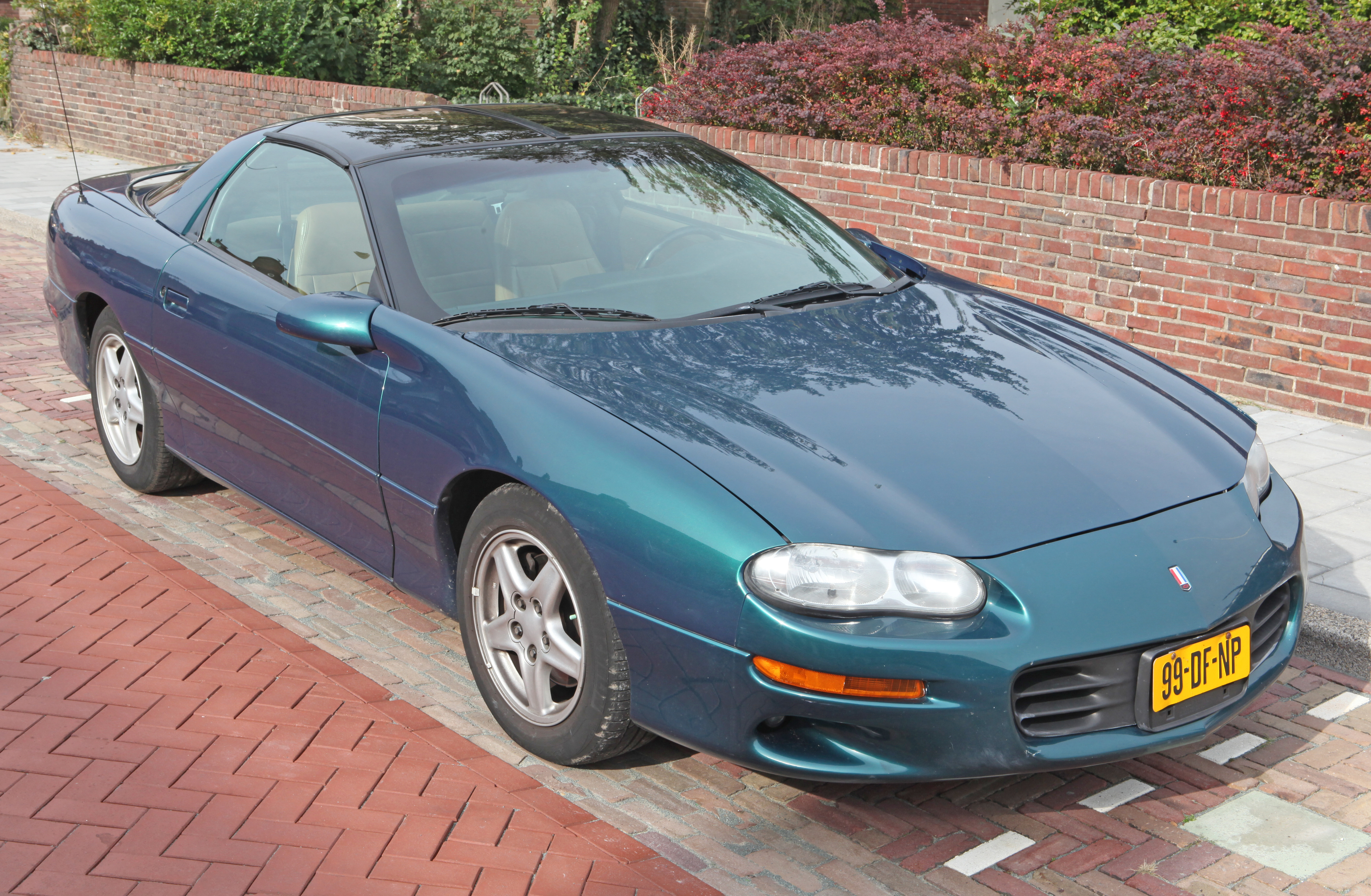
1998 Camaro

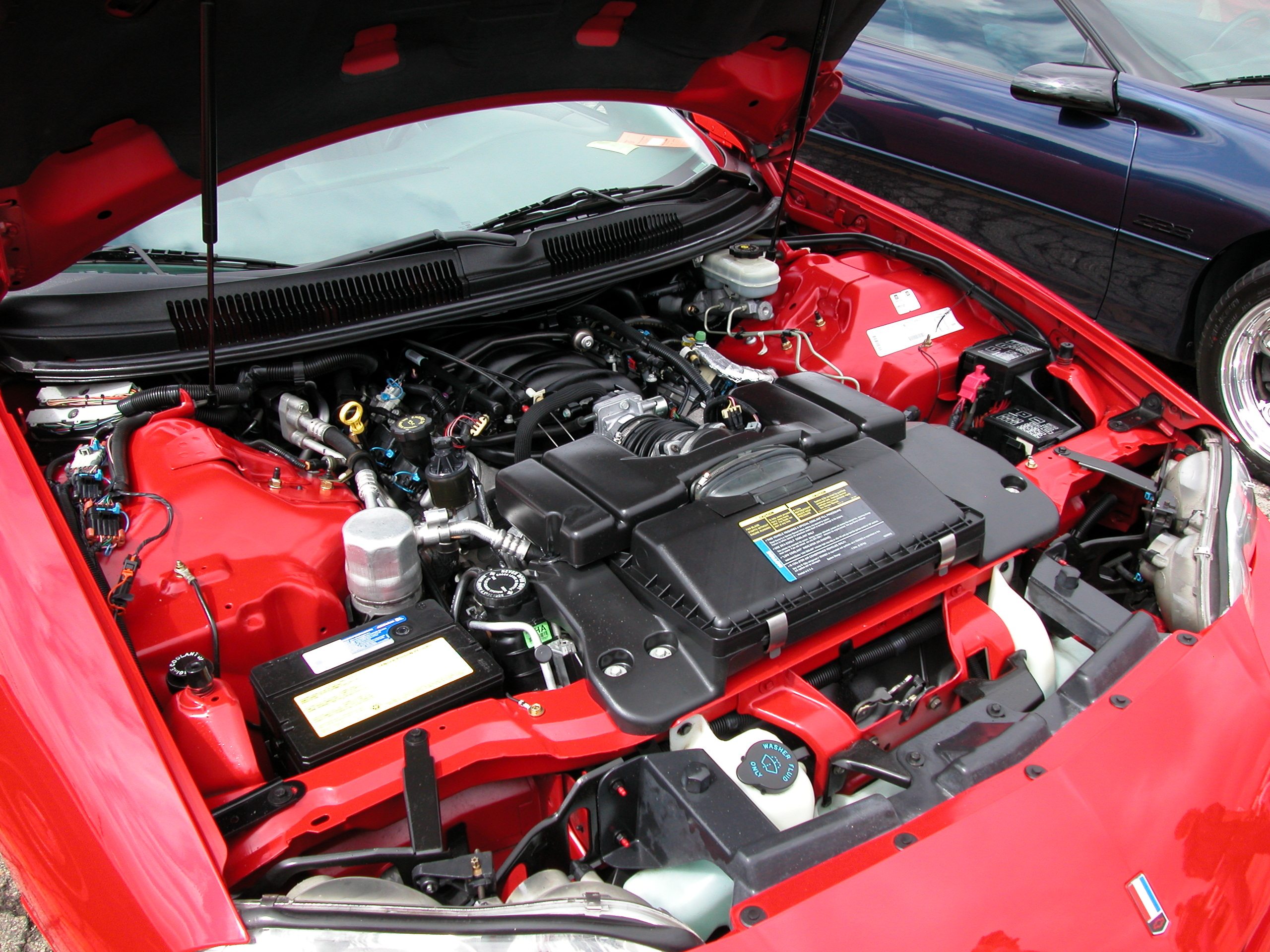
The engine bay of a 1998 Camaro Z28 with the 5.7-liter LS1 V8 engine

=== 1999 ===
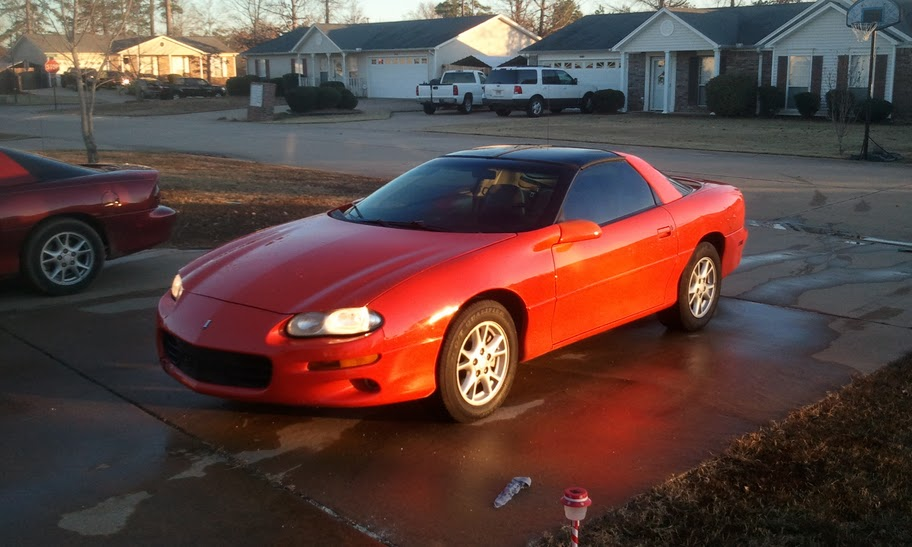
1999 Camaro finished in Hugger Orange

The 1999 model year saw only a few minor changes made to the Camaro. These included the introduction of new colors such as "Hugger Orange". The fuel tanks were now made of plastic with a 16.8 gallon capacity instead of preceding metal units which had a capacity of 15.5 gallons. The valve covers on the LS1 powered models were switched to a center-bolt style, and traction control now became available on the V6 models. A new "oil change" light was added to the instrument cluster as General Motors introduced their early oil-life monitoring systems. A Torsen differential was added for the Z28 and SS models. The 1999 model year was the final RPO 1LE performance option which included factory installed double adjustable Koni shocks, stiffer springs, a larger front and rear anti-roll bars, and stiffer suspension bushings.

=== 2000 ===
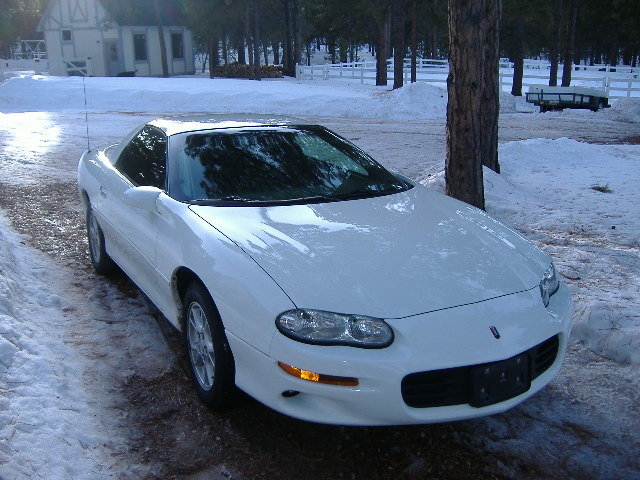
2000 Camaro V6

Changes for 2000 were also largely cosmetic. Monterey Maroon Metallic was added as an optional color, similar to the previously available Medium Patriot Red. The SS was not available in this color. The black exterior color was now renamed Ebony. Previously, all V8 powered models had side mirrors painted in this color. A new four-spoke steering wheel, as found in other GM models of the time, was introduced to replace the two-spoke steering wheel dating to the 1993 models. New ten-spoke 16-inch wheels became available, but the older five-spoke wheels were still optional. The base models came with 16-inch steel wheels with hubcaps. The 3.79 L (231 cu in) V6 and the 5.67 L (346 cu in) LS1 V8 engines continued with no changes.

=== 2001 ===
The 2001 model year was to be the lowest production for the Camaro with 29,009 units. This was partially due to production ending earlier than usual to begin work on the 35th Anniversary models commemorating 35 years of the Camaro. The Z28 and SS models received the intake manifold from the LS6 engine, used on the Z06 from 2001 to 2004 and the first generation of the Cadillac CTS-V from 2004 to 2005. This change also resulted in a revised camshaft profile and removal of the EGR system. Chevrolet also introduced a new slave cylinder for the clutch assembly that was superior to the design of previous years, as well as an LS6 clutch in manual models. Accordingly, the engine power output was increased to 310 hp (231 kW) for the Z28 and 325 hp (242 kW) for the SS, which also added a power steering cooler. SLP Engineering reintroduced the RS model this year, which included rally stripes and stock cold air intake system along with the Z28 take-off exhaust from their SS conversions.

=== 2002 ===
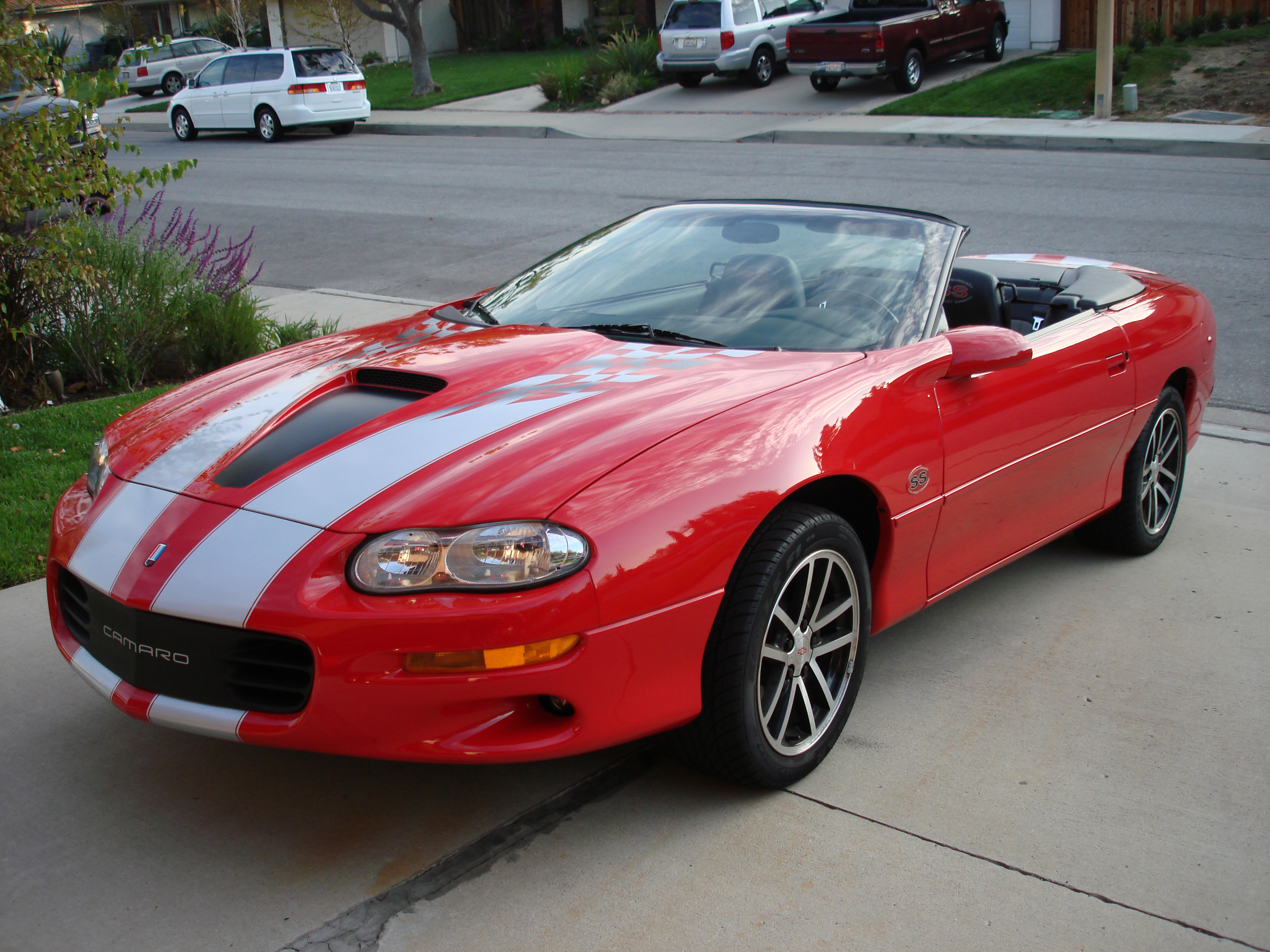
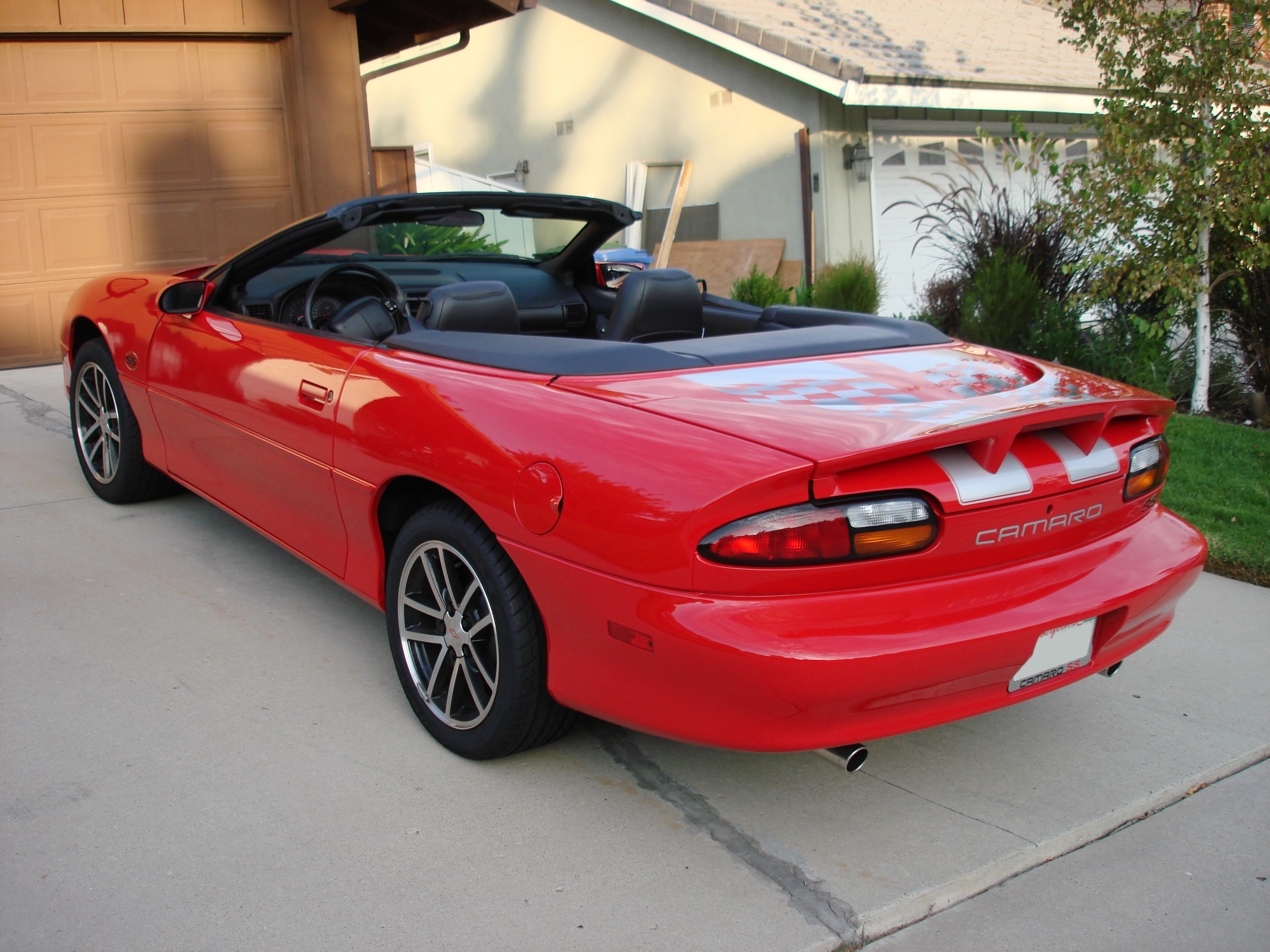
2002 SS 35th Anniversary Edition convertible

The final fourth-generation Camaro was built on 27 August 2002 after which the Boisbriand plant, located in the province of Quebec just outside of Montreal then closed down. Total production for 2002 was 42,098 units.

GM's Performance Division unveiled a Z28 show vehicle at the 2002 Woodward Dream Cruise as a send off for the Camaro's 35-year heritage. It emulated the 1960s and 1970s Penske-Sunoco stock TransAm race team vehicles. The 35th Anniversary trim package was also available for the SS.
