= 2005 12 Hours of Sebring =

Sports car endurance race held at Sebring International Raceway

Track map of the Sebring International Raceway

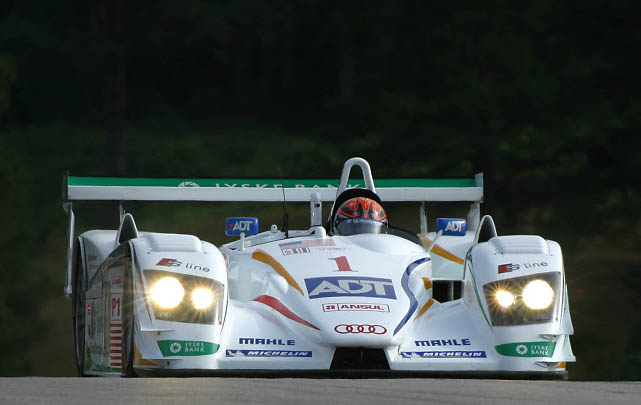
Audi R8

The 2005 12 Hours of Sebring was the 53rd running of this event, and took place on March 19, 2005. The race was sponsored by Mobil 1 and was the opening race of the 2005 American Le Mans Series season run by IMSA.

== Official results ==
Class winners in bold. Cars failing to complete 70% of winner's distance marked as Not Classified (NC).

Pos	Class	No	Team	Drivers	Chassis	Tyre	Laps
Pos	Class	No	Team	Drivers	Engine	Tyre	Laps
1	**LMP1**	**1**	**(United States) ADT Champion Racing**	**(Finland) JJ Lehto (Germany) Marco Werner (Denmark) Tom Kristensen**	**Audi R8**	MI	**361**
1	**LMP1**	**1**	**(United States) ADT Champion Racing**	**(Finland) JJ Lehto (Germany) Marco Werner (Denmark) Tom Kristensen**	**Audi 3.6 L Turbo V8**	MI	**361**
2	LMP1	2	(United States) ADT Champion Racing	(Italy) Emanuele Pirro (Germany) Frank Biela (United Kingdom) Allan McNish	Audi R8	MI	361
2	LMP1	2	(United States) ADT Champion Racing	(Italy) Emanuele Pirro (Germany) Frank Biela (United Kingdom) Allan McNish	Audi 3.6 L Turbo V8	MI	361
3	LMP1	16	(United States) Dyson Racing	(United Kingdom) James Weaver (United Kingdom) Andy Wallace (United States) Butch Leitzinger	MG-Lola EX257	MI	341
3	LMP1	16	(United States) Dyson Racing	(United Kingdom) James Weaver (United Kingdom) Andy Wallace (United States) Butch Leitzinger	MG (AER) XP20 2.0 L Turbo I4	MI	341
4	**GT1**	**57**	**(United Kingdom) Aston Martin Racing**	**(United Kingdom) Darren Turner (Australia) David Brabham (Monaco) Stéphane Ortelli**	**Aston Martin DBR9**	MI	**338**
4	**GT1**	**57**	**(United Kingdom) Aston Martin Racing**	**(United Kingdom) Darren Turner (Australia) David Brabham (Monaco) Stéphane Ortelli**	**Aston Martin 6.0 L V12**	MI	**338**
5	GT1	3	(United States) Corvette Racing	(Canada) Ron Fellows (United States) Johnny O'Connell (Italy) Max Papis	Chevrolet Corvette C6.R	MI	337
5	GT1	3	(United States) Corvette Racing	(Canada) Ron Fellows (United States) Johnny O'Connell (Italy) Max Papis	Chevrolet LS7R 7.0 L V8	MI	337
6	GT1	4	(United States) Corvette Racing	(United Kingdom) Oliver Gavin (Monaco) Olivier Beretta (Denmark) Jan Magnussen	Chevrolet Corvette C6.R	MI	323
6	GT1	4	(United States) Corvette Racing	(United Kingdom) Oliver Gavin (Monaco) Olivier Beretta (Denmark) Jan Magnussen	Chevrolet LS7R 7.0 L V8	MI	323
7	**GT2**	**31**	**(United States) Petersen Motorsports (United States) White Lightning Racing**	**(Germany) Lucas Luhr (Germany) Jörg Bergmeister (United States) Patrick Long**	**Porsche 911 GT3-RSR**	MI	**321**
7	**GT2**	**31**	**(United States) Petersen Motorsports (United States) White Lightning Racing**	**(Germany) Lucas Luhr (Germany) Jörg Bergmeister (United States) Patrick Long**	**Porsche 3.6 L Flat-6**	MI	**321**
8	GT1	63	(United States) ACEMCO Motorsports	(United Kingdom) Johnny Mowlem (United States) Terry Borcheller (Germany) Ralf Kelleners	Saleen S7-R	MI	318
8	GT1	63	(United States) ACEMCO Motorsports	(United Kingdom) Johnny Mowlem (United States) Terry Borcheller (Germany) Ralf Kelleners	Ford 7.0 L V8	MI	318
9	GT1	35	(Italy) Maserati Corse (United States) Risi Competizione	(Italy) Andrea Bertolini (Italy) Fabio Babini (Italy) Fabrizio de Simone	Maserati MC12	P	316
9	GT1	35	(Italy) Maserati Corse (United States) Risi Competizione	(Italy) Andrea Bertolini (Italy) Fabio Babini (Italy) Fabrizio de Simone	Maserati 6.0 L V12	P	316
10	GT1	5	(United States) Pacific Coast Motorsports	(United Kingdom) Ryan Dalziel (United States) Alex Figge (Canada) David Empringham	Chevrolet Corvette C5-R	Y	315
10	GT1	5	(United States) Pacific Coast Motorsports	(United Kingdom) Ryan Dalziel (United States) Alex Figge (Canada) David Empringham	Chevrolet LS7R 7.0 L V8	Y	315
11	GT2	79	(United States) J3 Racing	(United Kingdom) Tim Sugden (Sweden) Niclas Jönsson	Porsche 911 GT3-RSR	P	314
11	GT2	79	(United States) J3 Racing	(United Kingdom) Tim Sugden (Sweden) Niclas Jönsson	Porsche 3.6 L Flat-6	P	314
12	**LMP2**	**10**	**(United States) Miracle Motorsports**	**(United States) Jeff Bucknum (United States) Chris McMurry (United Kingdom) Ian James**	**Courage C65**	KU	**311**
12	**LMP2**	**10**	**(United States) Miracle Motorsports**	**(United States) Jeff Bucknum (United States) Chris McMurry (United Kingdom) Ian James**	**AER P07 2.0 L Turbo I4**	KU	**311**
13	GT2	45	(United States) Flying Lizard Motorsports	(United States) Jon Fogarty (United States) Johannes van Overbeek (United States) Darren Law	Porsche 911 GT3-RSR	MI	311
13	GT2	45	(United States) Flying Lizard Motorsports	(United States) Jon Fogarty (United States) Johannes van Overbeek (United States) Darren Law	Porsche 3.6 L Flat-6	MI	311
14	GT1	71	(United States) Carsport America	(France) Jean-Philippe Belloc (Italy) Michele Rugolo (United States) Tom Weickardt	Dodge Viper GTS-R	P	310
14	GT1	71	(United States) Carsport America	(France) Jean-Philippe Belloc (Italy) Michele Rugolo (United States) Tom Weickardt	Dodge 8.0 L V10	P	310
15	GT1	58	(United Kingdom) Aston Martin Racing	(Netherlands) Peter Kox (Portugal) Pedro Lamy (France) Stéphane Sarrazin	Aston Martin DBR9	MI	303
15	GT1	58	(United Kingdom) Aston Martin Racing	(Netherlands) Peter Kox (Portugal) Pedro Lamy (France) Stéphane Sarrazin	Aston Martin 6.0 L V12	MI	303
16	GT2	66	(United States) TRG	(United States) Tracy Krohn (United States) Michael Cawley (Belgium) Marc Sluszny	Porsche 911 GT3-RSR	MI	297
16	GT2	66	(United States) TRG	(United States) Tracy Krohn (United States) Michael Cawley (Belgium) Marc Sluszny	Porsche 3.6 L Flat-6	MI	297
17	GT2	96	(United Kingdom) IN2 Racing	(Netherlands) Michael Vergers (Denmark) Juan Barazi (United Kingdom) Andrew Thompson	Porsche 911 GT3-RSR	D	278
17	GT2	96	(United Kingdom) IN2 Racing	(Netherlands) Michael Vergers (Denmark) Juan Barazi (United Kingdom) Andrew Thompson	Porsche 3.6 L Flat-6	D	278
18	GT2	34	(United States) ZIP Racing	(United States) Spencer Pumpelly (United States) Andy Lally (United States) Steven Ivankovich	Porsche 911 GT3-R	P	275
18	GT2	34	(United States) ZIP Racing	(United States) Spencer Pumpelly (United States) Andy Lally (United States) Steven Ivankovich	Porsche 3.6 L Flat-6	P	275
19 DNF	LMP1	20	(United States) Dyson Racing	(United States) Chris Dyson (United Kingdom) Guy Smith	MG-Lola EX257	MI	264
19 DNF	LMP1	20	(United States) Dyson Racing	(United States) Chris Dyson (United Kingdom) Guy Smith	MG (AER) XP20 2.0L Turbo I4	MI	264
20 NC	GT2	51	(United States) Panoz Motor Sports	(United States) Gunnar Jeannette (United States) Bryan Sellers (Canada) Scott Maxwell	Panoz Esperante GT-LM	P	239
20 NC	GT2	51	(United States) Panoz Motor Sports	(United States) Gunnar Jeannette (United States) Bryan Sellers (Canada) Scott Maxwell	Ford (Elan) 5.0 L V8	P	239
21 DNF	LMP2	27	(Germany) Kruse Motorsport	(United Kingdom) Ian Mitchell (United Kingdom) Phillip Bennett (Switzerland) Harold Primat	Courage C65	P	238
21 DNF	LMP2	27	(Germany) Kruse Motorsport	(United Kingdom) Ian Mitchell (United Kingdom) Phillip Bennett (Switzerland) Harold Primat	Judd XV675 3.4 L V8	P	238
22 DNF	GT2	43	(United States) BAM!	(Germany) Mike Rockenfeller (Denmark) Martin Jensen (Canada) Tony Burgess	Porsche 911 GT3-RSR	Y	207
22 DNF	GT2	43	(United States) BAM!	(Germany) Mike Rockenfeller (Denmark) Martin Jensen (Canada) Tony Burgess	Porsche 3.6 L Flat-6	Y	207
23 DNF	LMP1	12	(United States) Autocon Motorsports	(United States) Michael Lewis (United States) Tomy Drissi (United States) Bryan Willman	Riley & Scott Mk III C	D	202
23 DNF	LMP1	12	(United States) Autocon Motorsports	(United States) Michael Lewis (United States) Tomy Drissi (United States) Bryan Willman	Elan 6L8 6.0 L V8	D	202
24 DNF	LMP2	37	(United States) Telesis Intersport Racing	(United States) Jon Field (United States) Duncan Dayton (United Kingdom) Gregor Fisken	Lola B05/40	G	166
24 DNF	LMP2	37	(United States) Telesis Intersport Racing	(United States) Jon Field (United States) Duncan Dayton (United Kingdom) Gregor Fisken	AER P07 2.0 L Turbo I4	G	166
25 DNF	GT1	83	(United Kingdom) Graham Nash Motorsport	(United Kingdom) Nigel Smith (United Kingdom) Ricky Cole (United States) Rick Sutherland	Saleen S7-R	P	159
25 DNF	GT1	83	(United Kingdom) Graham Nash Motorsport	(United Kingdom) Nigel Smith (United Kingdom) Ricky Cole (United States) Rick Sutherland	Ford 7.0 L V8	P	159
26 DNF	GT2	41	(United Kingdom) Team LNT	(United Kingdom) Richard Dean (United Kingdom) Patrick Pearce (United Kingdom) Marc Hynes	TVR Tuscan T400R	D	157
26 DNF	GT2	41	(United Kingdom) Team LNT	(United Kingdom) Richard Dean (United Kingdom) Patrick Pearce (United Kingdom) Marc Hynes	TVR Speed Six 4.0 L I6	D	157
27 DNF	GT1	86	(France) Larbre Compétition	(France) Christophe Bouchut (Italy) Fabrizio Gollin (France) Sébastien Bourdais	Ferrari 550-GTS Maranello	MI	155
27 DNF	GT1	86	(France) Larbre Compétition	(France) Christophe Bouchut (Italy) Fabrizio Gollin (France) Sébastien Bourdais	Ferrari 5.9 L V12	MI	155
28 DNF	GT2	40	(United Kingdom) Team LNT	(United Kingdom) Jonny Kane (United Kingdom) Warren Hughes (United Kingdom) Lawrence Tomlinson	TVR Tuscan T400R	D	136
28 DNF	GT2	40	(United Kingdom) Team LNT	(United Kingdom) Jonny Kane (United Kingdom) Warren Hughes (United Kingdom) Lawrence Tomlinson	TVR Speed Six 4.0 L I6	D	136
29 DNF	LMP1	88	(United Kingdom) Rollcentre Racing	(Portugal) João Barbosa (Belgium) Didier Theys (Germany) Michael Krumm	Dallara SP1	MI	130
29 DNF	LMP1	88	(United Kingdom) Rollcentre Racing	(Portugal) João Barbosa (Belgium) Didier Theys (Germany) Michael Krumm	Nissan 3.6 L Turbo V8	MI	130
30 DNF	GT2	50	(United States) Panoz Motor Sports	(United States) Bill Auberlen (United Kingdom) Robin Liddell (Italy) Emanuele Naspetti	Panoz Esperante GT-LM	P	121
30 DNF	GT2	50	(United States) Panoz Motor Sports	(United States) Bill Auberlen (United Kingdom) Robin Liddell (Italy) Emanuele Naspetti	Ford (Elan) 5.0 L V8	P	121
31 DNF	GT2	48	(Netherlands) Spyker Squadron	(Netherlands) Tom Coronel (Netherlands) Donny Crevels (Belgium) Marc Goossens	Spyker C8 Spyder GT2-R	D	121
31 DNF	GT2	48	(Netherlands) Spyker Squadron	(Netherlands) Tom Coronel (Netherlands) Donny Crevels (Belgium) Marc Goossens	Audi (Mader) 3.8 L V8	D	121
32 DNF	GT2	23	(United States) Alex Job Racing	(Germany) Timo Bernhard (Germany) Sascha Maassen (France) Romain Dumas	Porsche 911 GT3-RSR	MI	98
32 DNF	GT2	23	(United States) Alex Job Racing	(Germany) Timo Bernhard (Germany) Sascha Maassen (France) Romain Dumas	Porsche 3.6 L Flat-6	MI	98
33 DNF	LMP2	30	(United States) Telesis Intersport Racing	(United States) Clint Field (United States) Liz Halliday (United Kingdom) Gareth Ridpath	Lola B2K/40	P	62
33 DNF	LMP2	30	(United States) Telesis Intersport Racing	(United States) Clint Field (United States) Liz Halliday (United Kingdom) Gareth Ridpath	Judd XV675 3.4 L V8	P	62
34 DNF	GT2	24	(United States) Alex Job Racing	(United States) Randy Pobst (United States) Ian Baas (United States) Brian Cunningham	Porsche 911 GT3-RSR	MI	62
34 DNF	GT2	24	(United States) Alex Job Racing	(United States) Randy Pobst (United States) Ian Baas (United States) Brian Cunningham	Porsche 3.6 L Flat-6	MI	62
35 DNF	GT2	44	(United States) Flying Lizard Motorsports	(United States) Lonnie Pechnik (United States) David Murry (United States) Seth Neiman	Porsche 911 GT3-RSR	MI	46
35 DNF	GT2	44	(United States) Flying Lizard Motorsports	(United States) Lonnie Pechnik (United States) David Murry (United States) Seth Neiman	Porsche 3.6 L Flat-6	MI	46
36 DNF	GT2	67	(United States) TRG	(Germany) Pierre Ehret (United States) Kevin Buckler (United States) Andrew Davis	Porsche 911 GT3-RSR	MI	21
36 DNF	GT2	67	(United States) TRG	(Germany) Pierre Ehret (United States) Kevin Buckler (United States) Andrew Davis	Porsche 3.6 L Flat-6	MI	21
37 DNF	GT2	47	(Netherlands) Spyker Squadron	(Netherlands) Peter van Merksteijn (Netherlands) Frans Munsterhuis (United Kingdom) Marino Franchitti	Spyker C8 Spyder GT2-R	D	18
37 DNF	GT2	47	(Netherlands) Spyker Squadron	(Netherlands) Peter van Merksteijn (Netherlands) Frans Munsterhuis (United Kingdom) Marino Franchitti	Audi (Mader) 3.8 L V8	D	18
38 DNF	LMP2	15	(United States) Binnie Motorsports	(United States) William Binnie (Canada) Robert Julien (United Kingdom) Adam Sharpe	Lola B05/40	P	11
38 DNF	LMP2	15	(United States) Binnie Motorsports	(United States) William Binnie (Canada) Robert Julien (United Kingdom) Adam Sharpe	Nicholson-McLaren 3.3 L V8	P	11

== Statistics ==
- Pole Position - #1 ADT Champion Racing - Grid set by combined practice times
- Fastest Lap - #1 ADT Champion Racing - 1:48.580
- Distance - 1,335.7 miles (2,149.6 km)
- Average Speed - 111.028 mph (178.682 km/h)

American Le Mans Series
Previous race: None	2005 season	Next race: 2005 Grand Prix of Atlanta
