= Chris Dyson =

American racing driver (born 1978)

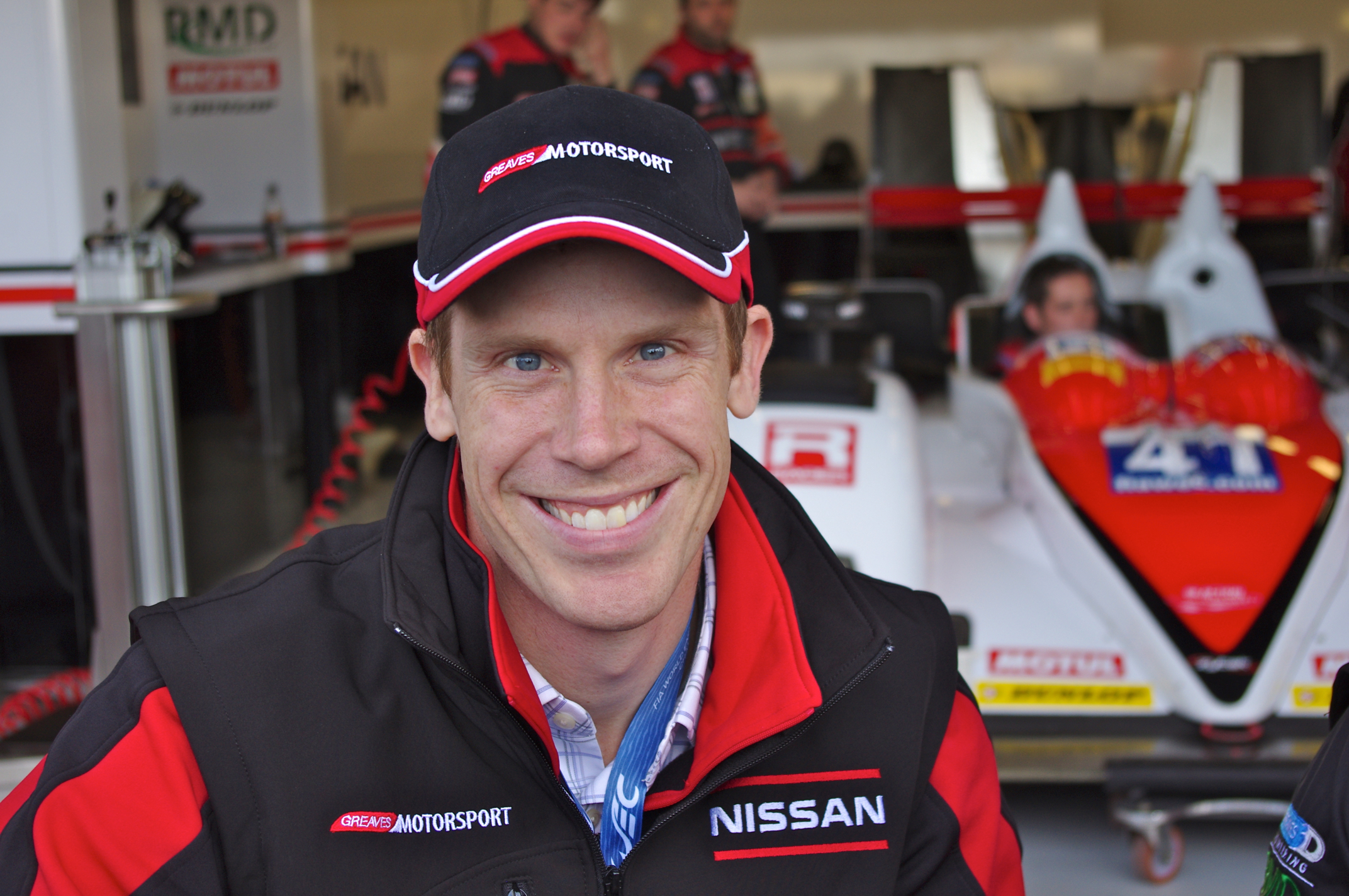
- Nationality: (United States) American
- Born: Christopher Dyson; February 24, 1978 (age 48) Poughkeepsie, New York, U.S.
- Relatives: Rob Dyson (father); Charles Dyson (grandfather); John S. Dyson (uncle)

Trans Am Series career
- Current team: CD Racing
- Categorisation: FIA Gold (until 2016); FIA Silver (2017–)
- Car number: 16
- Starts: 70
- Wins: 24
- Poles: 18
- Best finish: 1 in (2021, 2022, 2023)

Previous series
- Rolex Sports Car Series; Atlantic Championship

Championship titles
- 2003 2011 2021, 2022, 2023: ALMS LMP675; ALMS LMP1; Trans Am Series

24 Hours of Le Mans career
- Years: 2004, 2009, 2014
- Teams: Racing for Holland, RML, Caterham Racing
- Best finish: 7th (2004)

NASCAR O'Reilly Auto Parts Series career
- 2 races run over 2 years
- 2022 position: 67th
- Best finish: 67th (2022)
- First race: 2019 B&L Transport 170 (Mid-Ohio)
- Last race: 2022 Henry 180 (Road America)
| Wins | Top tens | Poles |
|---|---|---|
| 0 | 0 | 0 |
- Statistics up to date as of August 8, 2020.

Christopher Dyson (born February 24, 1978) is an American professional racing driver who competed in the American Le Mans Series for Dyson Racing from 2002 to 2013. He is currently competing in the Trans-Am Series in the TA class under the CD Racing banner where he just clinched his third consecutive TA championship (2021-2023). The son of team owner Rob Dyson, Chris is a two-time ALMS champion, having taken the LMP675 Drivers title in 2003 and earning the LMP1 Championship in 2011. He is the Vice President and Sporting Director of Dyson Racing.

== Racing career ==
=== Early career ===
Dyson began his racing career at the age of 17, competing in the Skip Barber Formula Dodge championship at Lime Rock Park.

Dyson drove in seven Atlantic Championship races in 2004 and 2005, earning a best finish of 4th at Long Beach in 2005.

=== Grand-Am ===
Dyson made his professional racing debut in the 2001 Grand American Road Racing Championship season, driving a Riley & Scott Mk III in the final two races of the season. In 2002, he finished second in the Grand-Am SRP1 points, winning five races.

Dyson has since made sporadic starts in the Rolex Sports Car Series and Continental Tire Sports Car Challenge.

=== American Le Mans Series ===
Dyson with his 2011 LMP1 championship trophy

Having made his American Le Mans Series debut at the 2002 12 Hours of Sebring, Dyson went on to drive full-time in the series one year later, teaming with Andy Wallace in their MG-Lola EX257. Dyson took four wins and the drivers championship in the LMP 675 class.

The 2004 season saw the MG-Lola reclassified into the LMP1 category against the Audi R8s; Dyson and Wallace scored six podiums in eight races together. In 2005, he finished second in the LMP1 drivers' championship, scoring six runner-up finishes.

Dyson finished fifth in driver points in 2006, with a best finish of 2nd at Mosport. Dyson also finished fourth at Laguna Seca with James Weaver, in Weaver's final race. 2007 saw Dyson team with Guy Smith in a Porsche RS Spyder; the pair finished fourth in points.

Dyson finished sixth in points in 2008 and 5th in 2009. In 2010, he finished fourth in LMP1 points and won one race with Guy Smith.

In 2011, despite winning only one race, Dyson and Guy Smith won the LMP1 drivers' championship. In 2012, Dyson kicked off the season with a class victory at the 12 Hours of Sebring, debuting the new Lola B12/60 Mazda with Guy Smith and Steven Kane.

=== 24 Hours of Le Mans ===
Dyson's first start came in the 2004 24 Hours of Le Mans for Jan Lammers' Racing for Holland team with Lammers and Katsutomo Kaneishi, finishing seventh overall and sixth in the LMP1 class. Dyson returned to La Sarthe in the Le Mans for Ray Mallock, retiring after 19 hours.

=== NASCAR ===
In August 2019, Dyson joined DGM Racing to drive their No. 90 car in the NASCAR Xfinity Series' race at the Mid-Ohio Sports Car Course as a road course ringer. He would start 27th and finish 34th after crashing out of the race. Dyson returned to NASCAR in 2022, driving for Emerling-Gase Motorsports in the Xfinity Series event at Road America.

== Awards ==
- Dyson was inducted into the Trans-Am Series Hall of Fame in 2025.

== Motorsports career results ==
=== Complete American Le Mans Series results ===
(key) (Races in bold indicate pole position; results in italics indicate fastest lap)

| Year | Entrant | Class | Chassis | Engine | 1 | 2 | 3 | 4 | 5 | 6 | 7 | 8 | 9 | 10 | 11 | 12 | Rank | Points | Ref |
|---|---|---|---|---|---|---|---|---|---|---|---|---|---|---|---|---|---|---|---|
| 2002 | Dyson Racing Team | LMP900 | Riley & Scott Mk III | Lincoln (Élan) 6.0 L V8 | SEB; 8 | SON; 4 | MID | AME | WAS; 7 | TRO; 6 | MOS | MON | MIA | PET | | | | | |
| 2003 | Dyson Racing | LMP675 | MG-Lola EX257 | MG (AER) XP20 2.0 L Turbo I4 | SEB; 1 | ATL; 3 | SON; 2 | TRO; Ret | MOS; 1 | AME; 1 | MON; Ret | MIA; 1 | PET; 2 | | | | | | |
| 2004 | Dyson Racing | LMP1 | MG-Lola EX257 | MG (AER) XP20 2.0 L Turbo I4 | SEB; Ret | MID; 2 | LIM; 3 | SON; 2 | POR; 3 | MOS; 3 | AME; Ret | PET; 3 | MON; Ret | | | | | | |
| 2005 | Dyson Racing | LMP1 | MG-Lola EX257 | MG (AER) XP20 2.0 L Turbo I4 | SEB; 4† | ATL; 2 | MID; 2 | LIM; 4† | SON; 2 | POR; 2 | AME; 2 | MOS; 4 | PET; 2 | MON; 3 | | | | | |
| 2006 | Dyson Racing | LMP1 | Lola B06/10 | AER P32T 3.6L Turbo V8 | SEB; Ret | TEX; 3 | MID; Ret | LIM; Ret | UTA; 4 | POR; 3 | AME; 5 | MOS; 2 | PET; Ret | MON; 5 | | | 7th | 73 | |
| 2007 | Dyson Racing | LMP2 | Porsche RS Spyder Evo | Porsche MR6 3.4 L V8 | SEB; 6 | STP; 6† | LNB; 5 | TEX; 5 | UTA; 4 | LIM; 4 | MID; 5 | AME; 4 | MOS; 5 | DET; 5 | PET; 2 | MON; 5 | 7th | 124 | |
| 2008 | Dyson Racing | LMP2 | Porsche RS Spyder Evo | Porsche MR6 3.4 L V8 | SEB; 3 | STP; 4 | LNB; 7 | UTA; 6 | LIM; Ret | MID; 5 | AME; 6 | MOS; 7 | DET; 6 | PET; 6 | MON; 5 | | 9th | 101 | |
| 2009 | Dyson Racing Team | LMP2 | Lola B09/86 | Mazda MZR-R 2.0 L Turbo I4 | SEB; Ret | STP; 2 | LBH; 2 | UTA; 3 | LRP; Ret | MOH; Ret | ELK; 4† | MOS; Ret | | | | | 6th | 55 | |
| 2009 | Dyson Racing Team | UNC | Lola B09/86 | Mazda MZR-R 2.0 L Turbo I4 | | | | | | | | | PET; 1 | LAG; 1 | | | NC | - | |
| 2010 | Dyson Racing Team | LMP2 | Lola B09/86 | Mazda MZR-R 2.0 L Turbo I4 | SEB; 3 | | | | | | | | PET; Ret | | | | 4th | 98 | |
| 2010 | Dyson Racing Team | LMP | Lola B09/86 | Mazda MZR-R 2.0 L Turbo I4 | | LNB; 4 | MON; 3 | UTA; 6† | LIM; Ret | MID; 1 | AME; 4 | MOS; 5 | | | | | 4th | 98 | |
| 2011 | Dyson Racing Team | LMP1 | Lola B09/86 | Mazda MZR-R 2.0 L Turbo I4 | SEB; 6 | LNB; 2 | LIM; 1 | MOS; 2 | MID; 2 | AME; 2 | BAL; 2 | MON; 2 | PET; 8† | | | | 1st | 186 | |
| 2012 | Dyson Racing Team | P1 | Lola B12/60 | Mazda MZR-R 2.0 L Turbo I4 (Isobutanol) | SEB; 4 | LBH; 2 | LAG; 2 | LRP; 2 | MOS; 2 | MOH; 2 | ELK; 1 | BAL; 2 | VIR; 2 | PET; 2 | | | 2nd | 186 | |
| 2013 | Dyson Racing Team | P1 | Lola B12/60 | Mazda MZR-R 2.0 L Turbo I4 (Isobutanol) | SEB; Ret | LBH; Ret | LAG; Ret | LRP; 2 | MOS | ELK | BAL; 2 | COA | VIR | PET; 2† | | | 4th | 52 | |

^{†} Did not finish the race but was classified as his car completed more than 70% of the overall winner's race distance.

=== 24 Hours of Le Mans ===
| Year | Team | Co-Drivers | Car | Class | Laps | Pos. | Class Pos. |
|---|---|---|---|---|---|---|---|
| 2004 | (Netherlands) Racing for Holland | (Netherlands) Jan Lammers (Japan) Katsutomo Kaneishi | Dome S101-Judd | LMP1 | 341 | 7th | 6th |
| 2009 | (United Kingdom) RML | (Brazil) Thomas Erdos (United Kingdom) Mike Newton | Lola B08/86-Mazda | LMP2 | 273 | DNF | DNF |
| 2014 | (Malaysia) Caterham Racing | (United Kingdom) Tom Kimber-Smith (United States) Matt McMurry | Zytek Z11SN-Nissan | LMP2 | 329 | 25th | 11th |

=== Complete FIA World Endurance Championship results ===
| Year | Entrant | Class | Car | Engine | 1 | 2 | 3 | 4 | 5 | 6 | 7 | 8 | Rank | Points |
|---|---|---|---|---|---|---|---|---|---|---|---|---|---|---|
| 2013 | Greaves Motorsport | LMP2 | Zytek Z11SN | Nissan VK45DE 4.5 L V8 | SIL; 5 | SPA; DNS | LMS | SÃO | COA; 5 | FUJ | SHA | BHR | 18th | 20 |
| 2019–20 | Team LNT | LMP1 | Ginetta G60-LT-P1 | AER P60C 2.4 L Turbo V6 | SIL | FUJ | SHA | BHR; Ret | COA | SPA | LMS | BHR | 25th | 0 |

=== NASCAR ===
(key) (Bold – Pole position awarded by qualifying time. Italics – Pole position earned by points standings or practice time. * – Most laps led.)

==== Xfinity Series ====
NASCAR Xfinity Series results
| Year | Team | No. | Make | 1 | 2 | 3 | 4 | 5 | 6 | 7 | 8 | 9 | 10 | 11 | 12 | 13 | 14 | 15 | 16 | 17 | 18 | 19 | 20 | 21 | 22 | 23 | 24 | 25 | 26 | 27 | 28 | 29 | 30 | 31 | 32 | 33 | NXSC | Pts | Ref |
|---|---|---|---|---|---|---|---|---|---|---|---|---|---|---|---|---|---|---|---|---|---|---|---|---|---|---|---|---|---|---|---|---|---|---|---|---|---|---|---|
| 2019 | DGM Racing | 90 | Chevy | DAY | ATL | LVS | PHO | CAL | TEX | BRI | RCH | TAL | DOV | CLT | POC | MCH | IOW | CHI | DAY | KEN | NHA | IOW | GLN | MOH; 34 | BRI | ROA | DAR | IND | LVS | RCH | CLT | DOV | KAN | TEX | PHO | HOM | 104th | 0^{1} | |
| 2022 | Emerling-Gase Motorsports | 35 | Toyota | DAY | CAL | LVS | PHO | ATL | COA | RCH | MAR | TAL | DOV | DAR | TEX | CLT | PIR | NSH | ROA; 28 | ATL | NHA | POC | IND | MCH | GLN | DAY | DAR | KAN | BRI | TEX | TAL | CLT | LVS | HOM | MAR | PHO | 67th | 9 | |

^{1} Ineligible for series points

Sporting positions
| Preceded by Jon Field | American Le Mans Series LMP675 champion 2003 | Succeeded by Ian James (LMP2) |
| Preceded by David Brabham; Simon Pagenaud | American Le Mans Series LMP1 champion 2011 with Guy Smith | Succeeded by Klaus Graf; Lucas Luhr (P1) |
