= 2008 Road America 500 =

Track map of Road America.

The 2008 Generac 500 at Road America presented by Time Warner Cable was the seventh round of the 2008 American Le Mans Series season. It took place at Road America, Wisconsin on August 9, 2008.

== Race results ==
Class winners in bold. Cars failing to complete 70% of winner's distance marked as Not Classified (NC).

Pos	Class	No	Team	Drivers	Chassis	Tyre	Laps
Pos	Class	No	Team	Drivers	Engine	Tyre	Laps
1	**LMP1**	**2**	**(United States) Audi Sport North America**	**(Germany) Marco Werner (Germany) Lucas Luhr**	**Audi R10 TDI**	MI	**102**
1	**LMP1**	**2**	**(United States) Audi Sport North America**	**(Germany) Marco Werner (Germany) Lucas Luhr**	**Audi TDI 5.5 L Turbo V12 (Diesel)**	MI	**102**
2	LMP1	1	(United States) Audi Sport North America	(Italy) Emanuele Pirro (Switzerland) Marcel Fässler	Audi R10 TDI	MI	102
2	LMP1	1	(United States) Audi Sport North America	(Italy) Emanuele Pirro (Switzerland) Marcel Fässler	Audi TDI 5.5 L Turbo V12 (Diesel)	MI	102
3	**LMP2**	**9**	**(United States) Patrón Highcroft Racing**	**(United States) Scott Sharp (Australia) David Brabham**	**Acura ARX-01B**	MI	**102**
3	**LMP2**	**9**	**(United States) Patrón Highcroft Racing**	**(United States) Scott Sharp (Australia) David Brabham**	**Acura AL7R 3.4 L V8**	MI	**102**
4	LMP2	7	(United States) Penske Racing	(Germany) Timo Bernhard (France) Romain Dumas	Porsche RS Spyder Evo	MI	102
4	LMP2	7	(United States) Penske Racing	(Germany) Timo Bernhard (France) Romain Dumas	Porsche MR6 3.4 L V8	MI	102
5	LMP2	20	(United States) Dyson Racing	(United States) Butch Leitzinger (United Kingdom) Marino Franchitti	Porsche RS Spyder Evo	MI	102
5	LMP2	20	(United States) Dyson Racing	(United States) Butch Leitzinger (United Kingdom) Marino Franchitti	Porsche MR6 3.4 L V8	MI	102
6	LMP2	6	(United States) Penske Racing	(United States) Patrick Long (Germany) Sascha Maassen	Porsche RS Spyder Evo	MI	102
6	LMP2	6	(United States) Penske Racing	(United States) Patrick Long (Germany) Sascha Maassen	Porsche MR6 3.4 L V8	MI	102
7	LMP1	37	(United States) Intersport Racing	(United States) Jon Field (United States) Clint Field (United States) Richard Berry	Lola B06/10	D	101
7	LMP1	37	(United States) Intersport Racing	(United States) Jon Field (United States) Clint Field (United States) Richard Berry	AER P32C 4.0 L Turbo V8 (E85 ethanol)	D	101
8	LMP2	8	(United States) B-K Motorsports	(United States) Gerardo Bonilla (United Kingdom) Ben Devlin	Lola B07/46	D	100
8	LMP2	8	(United States) B-K Motorsports	(United States) Gerardo Bonilla (United Kingdom) Ben Devlin	Mazda MZR-R 2.0 L Turbo I4 (E85 ethanol)	D	100
9	LMP2	16	(United States) Dyson Racing	(United States) Chris Dyson (United Kingdom) Guy Smith	Porsche RS Spyder Evo	MI	100
9	LMP2	16	(United States) Dyson Racing	(United States) Chris Dyson (United Kingdom) Guy Smith	Porsche MR6 3.4 L V8	MI	100
10	**GT1**	**3**	**(United States) Corvette Racing**	**(United States) Johnny O'Connell (Denmark) Jan Magnussen**	**Chevrolet Corvette C6.R**	MI	**97**
10	**GT1**	**3**	**(United States) Corvette Racing**	**(United States) Johnny O'Connell (Denmark) Jan Magnussen**	**Chevrolet LS7-R 7.0 L V8 (E85 ethanol)**	MI	**97**
11 DNF	LMP2	26	(United States) Andretti Green Racing	(France) Franck Montagny (United Kingdom) James Rossiter	Acura ARX-01B	MI	96
11 DNF	LMP2	26	(United States) Andretti Green Racing	(France) Franck Montagny (United Kingdom) James Rossiter	Acura AL7R 3.4 L V8	MI	96
12	**GT2**	**87**	**(United States) Farnbacher-Loles Motorsports**	**(United Kingdom) Richard Westbrook (Germany) Dirk Werner (United States) Bryce Miller**	**Porsche 997 GT3-RSR**	MI	**96**
12	**GT2**	**87**	**(United States) Farnbacher-Loles Motorsports**	**(United Kingdom) Richard Westbrook (Germany) Dirk Werner (United States) Bryce Miller**	**Porsche 4.0 L Flat-6**	MI	**96**
13	GT2	45	(United States) Flying Lizard Motorsports	(Germany) Jörg Bergmeister (Germany) Wolf Henzler	Porsche 997 GT3-RSR	MI	96
13	GT2	45	(United States) Flying Lizard Motorsports	(Germany) Jörg Bergmeister (Germany) Wolf Henzler	Porsche 4.0 L Flat-6	MI	96
14	GT2	71	(United States) Tafel Racing	(Germany) Dominik Farnbacher (Germany) Dirk Müller	Ferrari F430GT	MI	96
14	GT2	71	(United States) Tafel Racing	(Germany) Dominik Farnbacher (Germany) Dirk Müller	Ferrari 4.0 L V8	MI	96
15	GT2	46	(United States) Flying Lizard Motorsports	(United States) Johannes van Overbeek (France) Patrick Pilet	Porsche 997 GT3-RSR	MI	96
15	GT2	46	(United States) Flying Lizard Motorsports	(United States) Johannes van Overbeek (France) Patrick Pilet	Porsche 4.0 L Flat-6	MI	96
16	GT2	62	(United States) Risi Competizione	(Brazil) Jaime Melo (Finland) Mika Salo	Ferrari F430GT	MI	96
16	GT2	62	(United States) Risi Competizione	(Brazil) Jaime Melo (Finland) Mika Salo	Ferrari 4.0 L V8	MI	96
17	GT1	008	(United States) Bell Motorsports	(United States) Terry Borcheller (United States) Chapman Ducote	Aston Martin DBR9	D	95
17	GT1	008	(United States) Bell Motorsports	(United States) Terry Borcheller (United States) Chapman Ducote	Aston Martin 6.0 L V12	D	95
18	LMP2	66	(United States) de Ferran Motorsports	(Brazil) Gil de Ferran (France) Simon Pagenaud	Acura ARX-01B	MI	94
18	LMP2	66	(United States) de Ferran Motorsports	(Brazil) Gil de Ferran (France) Simon Pagenaud	Acura AL7R 3.4 L V8	MI	94
19	LMP1	30	(United States) Intersport Racing	(United Kingdom) Ryan Lewis (United Kingdom) Gregor Fisken (United States) John Faulkner	Lola B06/10	KU	94
19	LMP1	30	(United States) Intersport Racing	(United Kingdom) Ryan Lewis (United Kingdom) Gregor Fisken (United States) John Faulkner	AER P32C 3.6 L Turbo V8	KU	94
20	GT2	61	(United States) Risi Competizione	(United Kingdom) Rob Bell (United States) Harrison Brix	Ferrari F430GT	MI	94
20	GT2	61	(United States) Risi Competizione	(United Kingdom) Rob Bell (United States) Harrison Brix	Ferrari 4.0 L V8	MI	94
21	GT2	44	(United States) Flying Lizard Motorsports 44	(United States) Darren Law (United States) Seth Neiman	Porsche 997 GT3-RSR	MI	94
21	GT2	44	(United States) Flying Lizard Motorsports 44	(United States) Darren Law (United States) Seth Neiman	Porsche 4.0 L Flat-6	MI	94
22	GT2	18	(Germany) VICI Racing	(Netherlands) Nicky Pastorelli (Netherlands) Francesco Pastorelli (Germany) Marc Basseng	Porsche 997 GT3-RSR	KU	91
22	GT2	18	(Germany) VICI Racing	(Netherlands) Nicky Pastorelli (Netherlands) Francesco Pastorelli (Germany) Marc Basseng	Porsche 4.0 L Flat-6	KU	91
23	GT2	73	(United States) Tafel Racing	(United States) Jim Tafel (United States) Alex Figge	Ferrari F430GT	MI	91
23	GT2	73	(United States) Tafel Racing	(United States) Jim Tafel (United States) Alex Figge	Ferrari 4.0 L V8	MI	91
24	GT2	54	(United States) Black Swan Racing	(United States) Tim Pappas (United States) Anthony Lazzaro	Ford GT-R Mk.VII	FAL	89
24	GT2	54	(United States) Black Swan Racing	(United States) Tim Pappas (United States) Anthony Lazzaro	Ford 5.0 L V8	FAL	89
25 DNF	LMP2	15	(Mexico) Lowe's Fernández Racing	(Mexico) Adrian Fernández (Mexico) Luis Díaz	Acura ARX-01B	MI	88
25 DNF	LMP2	15	(Mexico) Lowe's Fernández Racing	(Mexico) Adrian Fernández (Mexico) Luis Díaz	Acura AL7R 3.4 L V8	MI	88
26 DNF	GT2	007	(United Kingdom) Drayson-Barwell	(United Kingdom) Paul Drayson (United Kingdom) Jonny Cocker	Aston Martin V8 Vantage GT2	D	84
26 DNF	GT2	007	(United Kingdom) Drayson-Barwell	(United Kingdom) Paul Drayson (United Kingdom) Jonny Cocker	Aston Martin 4.5 L V8 (E85 ethanol)	D	84
27	GT2	40	(United States) Robertson Racing	(United States) David Robertson (United States) Andrea Robertson (United States) David Murry	Ford GT-R Mk.VII	D	80
27	GT2	40	(United States) Robertson Racing	(United States) David Robertson (United States) Andrea Robertson (United States) David Murry	Ford 5.0 L V8	D	80
28 DNF	GT1	4	(United States) Corvette Racing	(United Kingdom) Oliver Gavin (Monaco) Olivier Beretta	Chevrolet Corvette C6.R	MI	76
28 DNF	GT1	4	(United States) Corvette Racing	(United Kingdom) Oliver Gavin (Monaco) Olivier Beretta	Chevrolet LS7-R 7.0 L V8 (E85 ethanol)	MI	76
29 DNF	GT2	21	(United States) Panoz Team PTG	(United States) Tom Milner (United States) Tom Sutherland (United States) Joey Hand	Panoz Esperante GT-LM	D	50
29 DNF	GT2	21	(United States) Panoz Team PTG	(United States) Tom Milner (United States) Tom Sutherland (United States) Joey Hand	Ford (Élan) 5.0 L V8	D	50
30 DNF	GT2	11	(United States) Primetime Race Group	(United States) Joel Feinberg (United Kingdom) Chris Hall	Dodge Viper Competition Coupe	HK	47
30 DNF	GT2	11	(United States) Primetime Race Group	(United States) Joel Feinberg (United Kingdom) Chris Hall	Dodge 8.3 L V10	HK	47
31 DNF	LMP1	12	(United States) Autocon Motorsports	(United States) Chris McMurry (United States) Bryan Willman (United States) Michael Lewis	Creation CA07	D	35
31 DNF	LMP1	12	(United States) Autocon Motorsports	(United States) Chris McMurry (United States) Bryan Willman (United States) Michael Lewis	Judd GV5 5.0 L V10	D	35

== Statistics ==
- Pole Position - #1 Audi Sport North America - 1:46.935
- Fastest Lap - #2 Audi Sport North America - 1:48.723
- Average Speed - 134.036 mph (215.710 km/h)

American Le Mans Series
Previous race: 2008 Sports Car Challenge of Mid-Ohio	2008 season	Next race: 2008 Grand Prix of Mosport
