= 2002 Rolex Sports Car Series =

3rd season of the racing series organized by Grand-Am

Seasons
- ← 2001 2003 →

The 2002 Grand American Road Racing Championship was the third season of the Rolex Sports Car Series run by the Grand American Road Racing Association. The season involved five classes: Sports Racing Prototype I and II (SRP-I and SRP-II), Grand Touring Sport (GTS), Grand Touring (GT), and American GT (AGT). 10 races were run from February 2, 2002 to November 10, 2002. Mont-Tremblant replaced Trois-Rivières. California Speedway replaced Lime Rock. Virginia International replaced Road America. The season also was marred by the death of Jeff Clinton during the Nextel 250 race weekend.

== Schedule ==
Rnd	Race	Length/Duration	Circuit	Date
1	Rolex 24 at Daytona	24 Hours	Daytona International Speedway	February 2 February 3
2	Nextel 250	250 Miles	Homestead-Miami Speedway	March 2
3	Grand American 400	400 Miles	California Speedway	March 23
4	United Auto 200	200 Miles	Phoenix International Raceway	April 20
5	Six Hours of the Glen	6 Hours	Watkins Glen International	June 23
6	Paul Revere 250	250 Miles	Daytona International Speedway	July 4
7	Bully Hill Vineyards 250	250 Miles	Watkins Glen International	August 9
8	VIR 500	500 Miles	Virginia International Raceway	September 1
9	6 Hours of Mont-Tremblant	6 Hours	Circuit Mont-Tremblant	September 15
10	The Grand American Finale at Daytona	3 Hours	Daytona International Speedway	November 10

== Results ==
Overall winners in bold.

Rnd	Circuit	SRP Winning Teams	SRPII Winning Teams	GTS Winning Teams	GT Winning Teams	AGT Winning Teams
Rnd	Circuit	SRP Winning Drivers	SRPII Winning Drivers	GTS Winning Drivers	GT Winning Drivers	AGT Winning Drivers
1	Daytona	(United States) **#27 Doran Lista Racing**	(United States) #8 Rand Racing/Risi Competizione	(United States) #3 Rocketsports Racing	(United States) #66 The Racers Group	(United States) #09 Flis Motorsports
1	Daytona	(Belgium) **Didier Theys** (Switzerland) **Fredy Lienhard, Sr.** (Italy) **Max Papis** (Italy) **Mauro Baldi**	(United States) Anthony Lazzaro (United States) Bill Rand (United States) Terry Borcheller (Germany) Ralf Kelleners	(United States) Paul Gentilozzi (United States) Scott Pruett (Germany) Michael Lauer (United States) Brian Simo	(United States) Kevin Buckler (United States) Michael Schrom (Germany) Jörg Bergmeister (Germany) Timo Bernhard	(United States) Craig Conway (United States) Doug Goad (United States) Andy Pilgrim (United States) Mike Ciasulli
2	Homestead	(United States) **#27 Doran Lista Racing**	(United States) #8 Rand Racing/Risi Competizione	(United States) #5 Park Place Racing	(France) #24 Perspective Racing	(United States) #90 Flis Motorsports
2	Homestead	(Belgium) **Didier Theys** (Italy) **Mauro Baldi**	(United States) Anthony Lazzaro (United States) Terry Borcheller (United States) Bill Rand	(United States) Chris Bingham (United States) Lewis Bakes	(France) Thierry Perrier (Portugal) João Barbosa (Belgium) Michel Neugarten	(United States) David Haskell (United States) Mike Ciasulli
3	California	(United States) **#27 Doran Lista Racing**	(United States) #8 Rand Racing/Risi Competizione	(United States) #5 Park Place Racing	(United States) #66 The Racers Group	(United States) #90 Flis Motorsports
3	California	(Belgium) **Didier Theys** (Switzerland) **Fredy Lienhard, Jr.**	(United States) Bill Rand (United States) Terry Borcheller (Germany) Ralf Kelleners	(United States) Chris Bingham (United States) Derek Hill	(United States) Kevin Buckler (United States) Michael Schrom	(United States) Paul Menard (United States) Mike Ciasulli
4	Phoenix	**(United States) #16 Dyson Racing Team**	(United States) #7 Rand Racing/Risi Competizione	(United States) #5 Park Place Racing	(United States) #54 Bell Motorsports	(United States) #90 Flis Motorsports
4	Phoenix	**(United Kingdom) James Weaver** **(United States) Chris Dyson**	(United Kingdom) Marino Franchitti (Sweden) Niclas Jönsson (United States) Bill Rand	(United States) Chris Bingham (United States) Rodney Mall	(United States) Boris Said	(United States) Paul Menard (United States) Jim Briody
5	Watkins Glen	**(United States) #16 Dyson Racing Team**	(United States) #8 Rand Racing/Risi Competizione	(United States) #72 Jack Lewis Enterprises	(United States) #33 Scuderia Ferrari of Washington	(United States) #47 Morgan Dollar Motorsports
5	Watkins Glen	**(United Kingdom) James Weaver** **(United States) Chris Dyson**	(United States) Anthony Lazzaro (United States) Terry Borcheller (Germany) Ralf Kelleners	(United States) Keith Fisher (United States) Jack Lewis	(United States) Cort Wagner (United States) Bill Auberlen	(United States) Rob Morgan (United States) Charles Morgan
6	Daytona	**(United States) #16 Dyson Racing Team**	(United States) #7 Rand Racing/Risi Competizione	(United States) #72 Jack Lewis Enterprises	(United States) #33 Scuderia Ferrari of Washington	(United States) #25 LG Motorsports
6	Daytona	**(United Kingdom) James Weaver** **(United States) Chris Dyson**	(United States) Anthony Lazzaro (United States) Jerry Nadeau	(United States) David Murry (United States) Jack Lewis	(United States) Cort Wagner (United States) Bill Auberlen	(United States) Lou Gigliotti (United States) Doug Goad
7	Watkins Glen	**(United States) #20 Dyson Racing Team**	(United States) #8 Rand Racing/Risi Competizione	(United States) #5 Park Place Racing	(United States) #33 Scuderia Ferrari of Washington	(United States) #48 Heritage Motorsports
7	Watkins Glen	**(United States) Butch Leitzinger** **(United States) Rob Dyson** **(United States) Dorsey Schroeder**	(United States) Anthony Lazzaro (United States) Terry Borcheller	(United States) Chris Bingham (Poland) Darius Grala (Austria) Franz Konrad	(United States) Cort Wagner (United States) Bill Auberlen	(United States) Tommy Riggins (United States) David Machavern
8	Virginia	**(United States) #16 Dyson Racing Team**	(United States) #8 Rand Racing/Risi Competizione	No Entries	(United States) #33 Scuderia Ferrari of Washington	(United States) #19 ACP Motorsports
8	Virginia	**(United Kingdom) Andy Wallace** **(United States) Chris Dyson**	(United States) Anthony Lazzaro (United States) Terry Borcheller	No Entries	(United States) Cort Wagner (United States) Bill Auberlen	(United States) Kerry Hitt (United States) Doug Mills (United States) Owen Trinkler
9	Mont-Tremblant	(United States) **#27 Doran Lista Racing**	(United States) #70 G&W Motorsports	(United States) #67 The Racers Group	(United States) #33 Scuderia Ferrari of Washington	(United States) #29 Sky Blue Racing
9	Mont-Tremblant	(Belgium) **Didier Theys** (Switzerland) **Fredy Lienhard, Jr.** (Switzerland) **Fredy Lienhard, Sr.**	(United States) Darren Law (Italy) Armando Trentini (United States) Andy Lally	(United States) Kevin Buckler (United States) Chris Perot (United States) Michael Schrom	(United States) Cort Wagner (United States) Bill Auberlen	(United States) Eric Curran (United States) Darin Brassfield
10	Daytona	**(United States) #16 Dyson Racing Team**	(United States) #8 Rand Racing	(United Kingdom) #85 Graham Nash Motorsport	(United States) #81 G&W Motorsports	(United States) #46 Morgan Dollar Motorsports
10	Daytona	**(United Kingdom) James Weaver** **(United States) Chris Dyson**	(United States) Anthony Lazzaro (United States) Terry Borcheller	(United Kingdom) Mike Newton (United States) Randolph Watkins	(United States) Darren Law (United States) Brent Martini	(United States) Rob Morgan (United States) Charles Morgan
