= Rob Dyson =

American racing driver

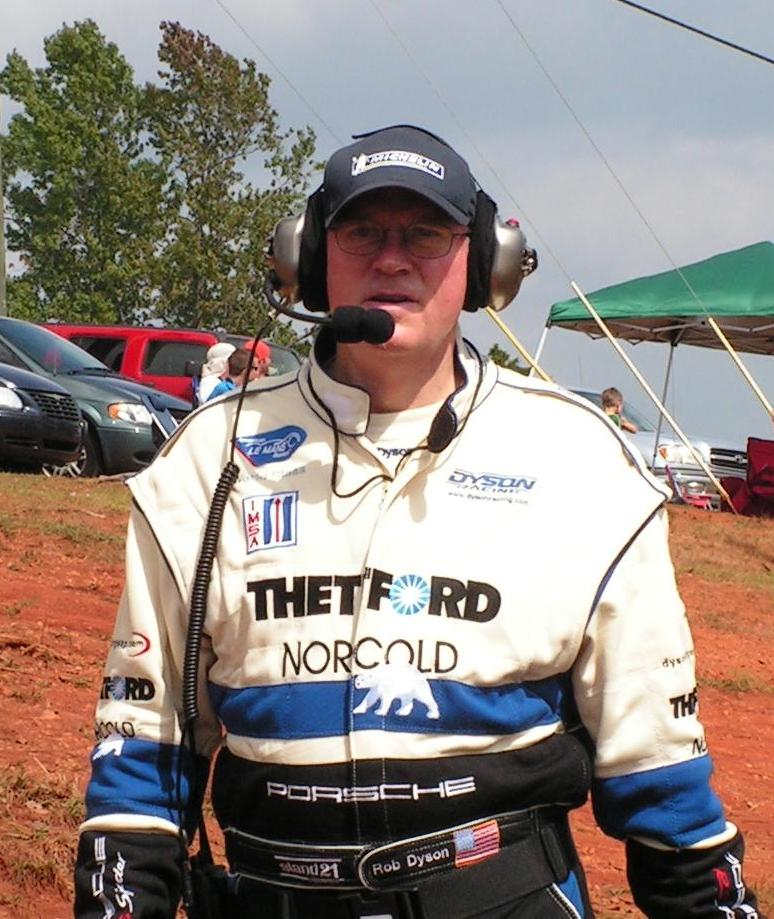
- Dyson at the 2007 Petit Le Mans
- Nationality: (United States) American
- Born: Robert Richard Dyson; June 21, 1946 (age 79)
- Relatives: Chris Dyson (son); Charles Dyson (father); John S. Dyson (brother)

Robert Richard Dyson (born June 21, 1946) is a retired American sports car racing driver and owner of Dyson Racing.

Dyson began competing in amateur SCCA competition in 1974 and began racing professionally in IMSA GTO and the Trans-Am Series in 1982. In 1985, he purchased a Porsche 962 from Bruce Leven and began racing in IMSA GTP. In 1995, his team was the first to run the new Riley & Scott Mk III, refusing to run the Ferrari 333 SP, as he felt it would make the World Sportscar Championship a "spec series" if all major teams were running the car. Dyson and his team with its R&S Mk III won the 1997 24 Hours of Daytona with an "all star" squad of seven drivers including sports car legends James Weaver, Elliott Forbes-Robinson, and Butch Leitzinger. The Dyson team again won the race in 1999, this time without Dyson as one of the drivers. The team later purchased Lola chassis and began racing in the American Le Mans Series, where it currently competes. Dyson retired from full-time racing in 2003 but continued to drive part-time until 2007. Rob's son Chris Dyson drove for the team from 2001 to 2013.

== Racing record ==
=== SCCA National Championship Runoffs ===
Year	Track	Car	Engine	Class	Finish	Start	Status
1977	Road Atlanta	Datsun 510	Datsun	B Sedan	4	5	Running
1978	Road Atlanta	Datsun 200SX	Datsun	B Sedan	5	9	Running
1980	Road Atlanta	Datsun 200SX	Datsun	GT2	17	6	Running
1981	Road Atlanta	Datsun 200SX	Datsun	GT2	1	8	Running
1982	Road Atlanta	Datsun 200SX	Datsun	GT2	7		Running

=== 24 Hours of Le Mans results ===
Year	Team	Co-drivers	Car	Class	Laps	Pos.	Class pos.
1986	(United Kingdom) Liqui Moly Equipe	(Italy) Mauro Baldi (United States) Price Cobb	Porsche 956 GTi	C1	318	9th	7th
