= David Ryan Just =

American economist

David Ryan Just (born December 16, 1974) is an American behavioral economist at Cornell University.

Just received his Ph.D. from University of California, Berkeley, in 2001, after which he joined the Charles H. Dyson School of Applied Economics and Management at Cornell University as an assistant professor; he was appointed professor in 2014.

As of 2018 he had authored or co-authored around 100 peer-reviewed publications and had written a textbook, “Introduction to Behavioral Economics.” Over a dozen of Just's papers with Brian Wansink (formerly professor at Cornell's Dyson School) were retracted.
