= Cornell SC Johnson College of Business =

The Cornell SC Johnson College of Business is Cornell University's business college, which consists of:

- Cornell Johnson Graduate School of Management
- Dyson School of Applied Economics and Management
- Nolan School of Hotel Administration
