= Mark Green (New York politician) =

American lawyer (born 1945)

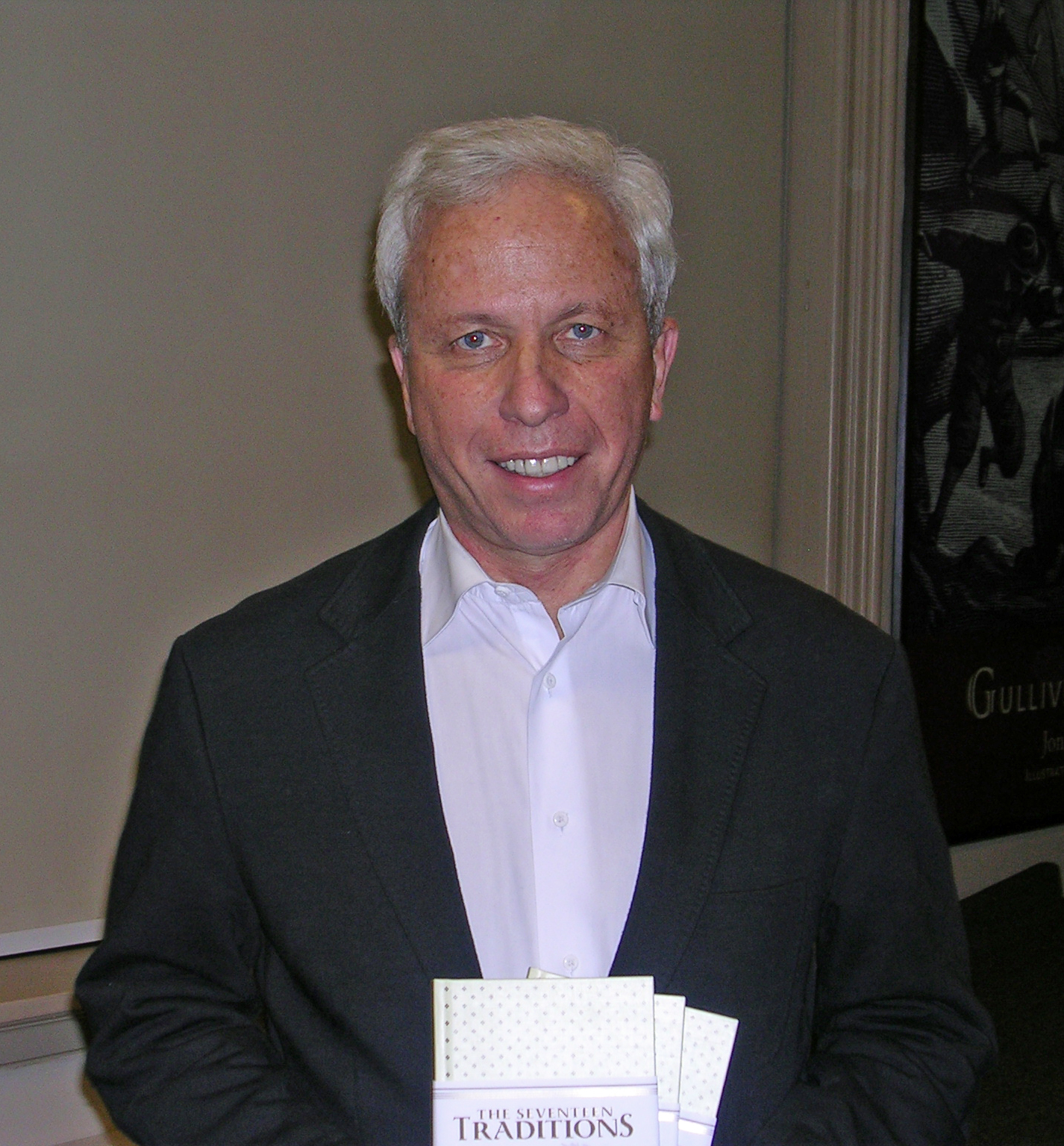
- Green in 2007

1st New York City Public Advocate
- In office January 1, 1994 – December 31, 2001
- Preceded by: Andrew Stein (as President of the New York City Council)
- Succeeded by: Betsy Gotbaum

Personal details
- Born: Mark Joseph Green; March 15, 1945 (age 81) New York City, U.S.
- Party: Democratic
- Spouse(s): Lynn Heineman (divorced); Deni Frand (m. 1977)
- Children: 2
- Relatives: Stephen L. Green (brother)
- Education: Cornell University (BA); Harvard University (JD)

Mark Joseph Green (born March 15, 1945) is an American author, lawyer, and Democratic politician from New York City. Green was New York City Consumer Affairs Commissioner from 1990 to 1993 and the first New York City Public Advocate from 1994 to 2002.

== Early life and education ==
Green was born to a Jewish family in Brooklyn, New York. He lived in Bensonhurst, Brooklyn, until he was three and then moved to Long Island, first to Elmont, New York, and later Great Neck, New York. Both his parents were Republicans; his father was a lawyer and residential apartment landlord and his mother a public-school teacher.

Green graduated from Great Neck South High School in 1963, from Cornell University in 1967 and in 1970 from Harvard Law School, where he was editor-in-chief of the Harvard Civil Rights-Civil Liberties Law Review. He has a brother, the prominent realtor Stephen L. Green, founder of SLGreen Realty Corp.

== Political career ==
=== 1960s – 1970s ===
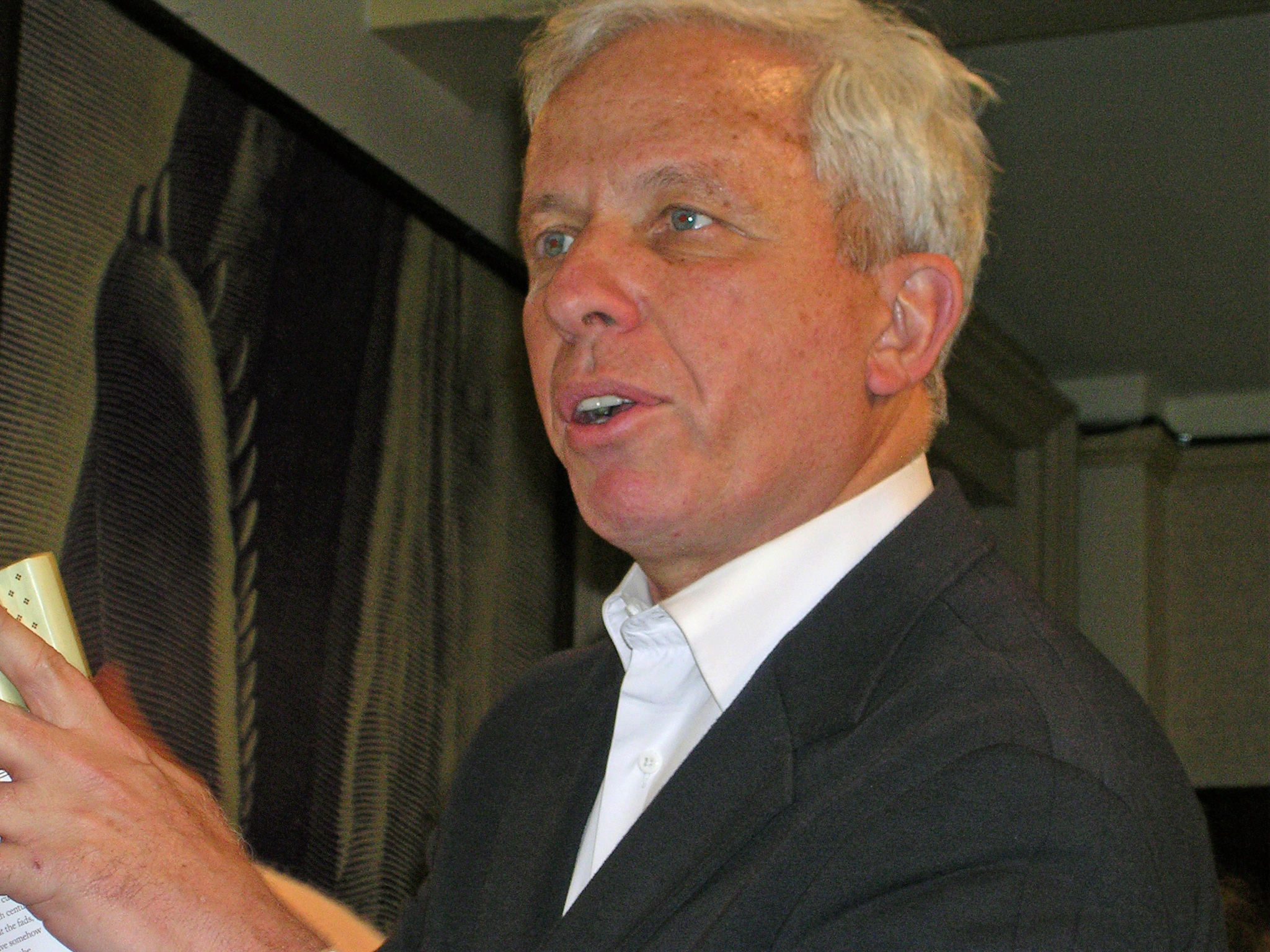
Mark Green delivering a speech

In 1967, Green interned for Jacob Javits, and while in law school in the early 1970s, was a "Nader's Raider" at Ralph Nader's Public Citizen, where he worked on a lawsuit against the Richard Nixon administration after the firing of Watergate special prosecutor Archibald Cox. After law school, Green returned to Washington, D.C., and ran the Congress Watch division of the consumer rights advocacy group Public Citizen from 1977 to 1980. In 1976, he managed former U.S. Attorney General Ramsey Clark's campaign for the Senate seat of James Buckley. Clark came in third, behind Ambassador Daniel Patrick Moynihan and Representative Bella Abzug.

=== 1980s ===
In 1980, Green returned to New York City and won the Democratic primary election to represent the East Side of Manhattan in the House of Representatives; he lost the race to Republican incumbent Bill Green (no relation). In 1981, Green and songwriter Harry Chapin founded the New Democracy Project, a public policy institute in New York City. Green ran it for a 30 years. During the 1984 presidential election, he served as chief speechwriter for Democratic candidate Senator Gary Hart, who ran second in the primaries.

In 1986, Green won the Democratic nomination for the Senate against multimillionaire John Dyson, spending $800,000 to Dyson's self-financed $6,000,000. Dyson remained on the ballot as the candidate of the Liberal Party. Green lost the general election to Republican incumbent Alfonse D'Amato, who was supported by then mayor Ed Koch; Green filed a formal ethics complaint in the Senate Ethics Committee against D'Amato that resulted in D'Amato's being reprimanded by the Senate after media reports suggested that he had exploited his position as chair of the Senate Committee of Banking, Housing, and Urban Affairs to coerce financing of his Senate campaign.

During his Senate campaign, Green refused to accept money from special interest groups' political action committees (PACs) – which had accounted for 25% of all campaign spending in Congressional campaigns in 1984 – denouncing PACs as "legalized bribery." His opinion mirrored the stance of Common Cause, the citizens' lobby that organized to abolish PACs over fears of "special interests" buying votes.

=== 1990s ===
In 1990, Mayor David Dinkins appointed Green Consumer Affairs Commissioner of New York City. Green was elected as the first New York City Public Advocate in 1993 and reelected in 1997. In that office, he led investigations of HMOs, hospitals, and nursing homes that led to fines by the New York State Attorney General.

Green led an effort against tobacco advertising aimed at children, enacting a law banning cigarette vending machines, and released a series of exposés and legal actions against tobacco advertising targeting children—concluding that R. J. Reynolds Tobacco Company was engaged in "commercial child abuse"—that culminated in a 1997 Federal Trade Commission decision that ended the Joe Camel ads. He also create a national campaign "Kick Butts Day" -- launched with President Bill Clinton in Brooklyn in May, 1996 -- that enlisted hundreds of high schools to engage in a variety of local activism on the dangers of teen smoking; he transferred the organization to the Campaign for Tobacco-Free Kids in 1999, which still coordinates the national day of events.

As public advocate, Green first proposed the 311 complaint help line that Mayor Mike Bloomberg later implemented. He wrote laws that matched small donations with multiple city funds, created the Voter Commission, barred stores from charging women more than men for the same services, and prohibited companies from firing female employees merely because they were victims of domestic violence. He organized the mayors of 20 American cities, under the auspices of Mayor Dinkins, to persuade the French manufacturer of RU-486 (mifipristone) to ignore right-wing opposition to this "abortion pill" and begin importing it into the U.S. He worked personally with President Clinton early in his term to persuade the FDA to approve of this non-medical aborticfacient. And he started the city's first web site, NYC.gov, which he later gifted to City Hall, where it is still in use.

One of Green's highest-profile accomplishments was a lawsuit to obtain information about racial profiling in Rudy Giuliani's police force. As Green told the Gotham Gazette, "We sued Mayor Giuliani because he was in deep denial about racial profiling. [After winning the case, we] released an investigation showing a pattern of unpunished misconduct ... [and] the rate that police with substantiated complaints are punished rose from 25 percent to 75 percent." Green was reportedly one of the first public officials to draw attention to racial profiling by the NYPD.

Green ran for the U.S. Senate again in 1998, when D'Amato was seeking a fourth term. Green finished third in the Democratic primary behind the winner, U.S. Representative Charles Schumer, and 1984 Democratic vice presidential nominee Geraldine Ferraro.

In the 2000 campaign, Green praised Nader's work as a consumer advocate but endorsed Democratic nominee Al Gore, who narrowly lost the election to George W. Bush. In 2000, he assisted the successful Senate campaign of First Lady Hillary Clinton, coining the phrase "Listening Tour" to help guide Clinton through a state she hadn't previously lived in. In 2004, Green co-chaired Senator John Kerry's presidential campaign in New York; and he advised Bill Clinton in his decisive 1992 New York presidential primary, who later credited Green with his strategy of campaigning against Gov. Jerry Brown's proposed regressive sales tax as anti-middle class.

=== 2001 campaign for mayor ===
In 2001 Green ran for mayor of New York City and won the Democratic nomination but lost to Republican nominee Michael Bloomberg 50%–48% in the closest NYC mayoral election in a century. Green narrowly defeated Fernando Ferrer in the primary, surviving a negative contest that divided the party. The two other candidates were Council Speaker Peter Vallone and City Comptroller Alan Hevesi.

The September 11, 2001 terrorist attacks occurred on the morning of the Democratic primary and contributed to Green's loss. Bloomberg spent an unprecedented $74 million on his campaign, especially on TV ads and direct mail. Mayor Rudy Giuliani, who was suddenly extremely popular, endorsed Bloomberg.

The Economist wrote, "The billionaire businessman [Bloomberg] is usually seen as one of the post–September 11th winners (if such a word can be so used): he would probably have lost the mayoralty to Mark Green, a leftish Democrat, had the terrorist strike not happened. Yet it is also worth noting that his election probably spared New York City a turbulent period of score-settling over Rudy Giuliani's legacy." Chris Smith wrote in New York Magazine in 2011, "Many old-school Democrats believe that Bloomberg's 2001 victory over Mark Green was a terrorist-provoked, money-soaked aberration."

The Ferrer campaign criticized Green for the actions of supporters in the runoff that were construed as racist, involving literature with New York Post caricatures of Ferrer and Al Sharpton distributed in white enclaves of Brooklyn and Staten Island. An investigation by the district attorney of Kings County, New York, Charles J. Hynes, came to the conclusion that "Mark Green had no knowledge of these events, and that when he learned of them, he repeatedly denounced the distribution of this literature and sought to find out who had engaged in it."

The incident kept Ferrer from endorsing Green and is thought to have diminished minority turnout in the general election, which helped Bloomberg win in an overwhelmingly Democratic city. Green wrote an article about the campaign a decade later in the 9/11 anniversary issue of New York Magazine. He reported that Bloomberg told him in 2002 that "I wouldn't have won" without Ferrer's late campaign opposition to Green.

=== 2006 campaign for New York Attorney General ===
Green ran in the Democratic primary for New York State Attorney General in 2006. He faced former HUD Secretary Andrew Cuomo, former White House Staff Secretary Sean Patrick Maloney, and former lieutenant governor candidate Charles King in the primary. He held several endorsements of note, including former NYC Mayor David Dinkins, Brooklyn Borough President Marty Markowitz, the Sierra Club, the National Organization for Women (NOW), the New York Times, and the New York Daily News.

On September 12, 2006, Green lost to Andrew Cuomo in his bid to secure the Democratic nomination to succeed then-Attorney General Eliot Spitzer.

=== State and city campaign tickets ===
Mark J. Green has appeared on these slates:

- 1986 New York state Democratic ticket
  - Governor: Mario Cuomo
  - Lieutenant Governor: Stan Lundine
  - Comptroller: Herman Badillo
  - Attorney General: Robert Abrams
  - U.S. Senate: Mark J. Green
- 1993 New York City Democratic ticket
  - Mayor: David Dinkins
  - Public Advocate: Mark J. Green
  - Comptroller: Alan Hevesi
- 1997 New York City Democratic ticket
  - Mayor: Ruth Messinger
  - Public Advocate: Mark J. Green
  - Comptroller: Alan Hevesi
- 2001 New York City Democratic ticket
  - Mayor: Mark J. Green
  - Public Advocate: Betsy Gotbaum
  - Comptroller: William Thompson

== Television and radio ==
He was a regular guest on Crossfire on CNN, and also on William F. Buckley's Firing Line, Inside City Hall on NY1, and Hardball with Chris Matthews on MSNBC.

On March 6, 2007, Green's brother, New York real estate magnate Stephen L. Green, purchased majority shares in Air America Radio. Stephen served as chairman, and Mark as president. Stephen sold Air America Radio in 2009 to Charles Kireker. Mark continued as president.

Green was co-host, with Arianna Huffington, of the syndicated talk show 7 Days in America, which aired on the network. from 2007–2009. He was the host of Both Sides Now, nationally syndicated on 200 stations and recorded at WOR710 AM in New York City; the program ended in December 2016.

On February 27, 2017, Green founded and ran the Twitter handle @ShadowingTrump [later renamed ShadowingDC, now with 48,000 followers "to daily debunk Trump and propose progressive alternatives." His "Shadow Cabinet" of 21 included such national progressive leaders as Laurence Tribe as attorney general, Robert Reich as secretary of labor, Diane Ravitch as Education Secretary, Rashad Robinson as "Secretary of Justice Issues", Marielena Hincapie of the National Immigration Law Center as Immigration Secretary. Renamed @ShadowingDC in 2021, it had 68,000 followers by April 2021.

== Personal life ==
Green has been married twice. His first marriage, to Lynn Heineman, whom he married while in law school, lasted 18 months. In 1977, Green married Deni Frand, who later became the director of the New York City office of the liberal interest group People for the American Way and a senior associate at AOL-Time Warner and the Citi Foundation. They have two adult children. and four grandchildren.

== Selected publications ==
- Who Runs Congress? (co-authored with Michael Waldman; 1972)
- Taming the Giant Corporation (co-authored with Ralph Nader and Joel Seligman; 1976)
- There He Goes Again: Ronald Reagan's Reign of Error, co-authored with Gail MacColl, ISBN 0-3947-2171-3 (1983, updated and expanded edition 1987)
- The Consumer Bible (co-authored with Nancy Youman; 1995)
- Selling Out: How Big Corporate Money Buys Elections, Rams through Legislation, and Betrays Our Democracy (2002); ISBN 0-06-052392-1
- The Book on Bush: How George W. Bush (Mis)leads America (co-authored with Eric Alterman; 2004); ISBN 0-670-03273-5
- Bright, Infinite Future: A Generational Memoir on the Progressive Rise (2016); ISBN 1-250-07157-7
- Fake President – Decoding Trump's Gaslighting, Corruption, and General Bullsh*t (with Ralph Nader; 2019) ISBN 9781510751125
- "The Inflection Election:Progress or Fascism in 2024?" (ISBN 978-1-5107-8083-5)

Party political offices
Preceded by Elizabeth Holtzman	Democratic nominee for U.S. Senator from New York (Class 3); 1986	Succeeded by Robert Abrams
Preceded by Ruth Messinger	Democratic nominee for Mayor of New York; 2001	Succeeded by Fernando Ferrer
Political offices
New office	New York City Public Advocate; 1994–2001	Succeeded by Betsy Gotbaum
Preceded by Andrew Stein	President of the New York City Council; 1994–2001	Succeeded by Gifford Miller as Speaker of the New York City Council
