= Stephen L. Green =

American real estate developer (born 1938)

- Born: Stephen Lawrence Green; January 28, 1938 (age 88)
- Education: Hartwick College (BA); Boston College (LLB)
- Occupation: Real estate developer
- Known for: founder of SL Green Realty
- Spouse(s): Sandra Turboff (divorced); Nancy Peck
- Children: 3
- Family: Mark Green (brother)

Signature
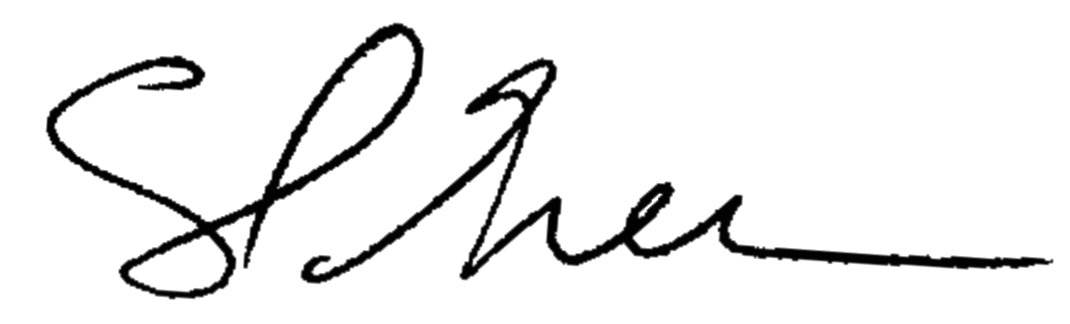

Stephen Lawrence Green (born January 28, 1938) is an American real estate developer. He is the founder and former chairman of SL Green Realty Corp., which claims to be Manhattan’s largest owner of office buildings. He retired in January 2019 and is now chairman emeritus. He has been chairman of the company since 1997. Marc Holliday succeeded him as chairman.

== Early life ==
Green lived in Bensonhurst, Brooklyn, until he was ten and then moved to Nassau County on Long Island. His father was a lawyer and landlord while his mother was a teacher. His parents were both Republicans. He has one brother, seven years his junior, former New York City Public Advocate Mark Green.

Green received a BA from Hartwick College in 1959, and during his time there he was a member of the Alpha Delta Omega fraternity. He received his Bachelor of Laws from Boston College Law School in 1962.

Green worked as an attorney in Houston, Texas, for Vinson & Elkins for several years before starting an import-export firm specializing in the sale of hair products from Asia. He later sold that business and started a travel company that chartered airliners and sold ski vacations in the American West and Europe. Giving this up, he invested in waterfront property in Siesta Key, Florida, and developed real estate, but eventually returned to New York City, where he started investing in loft buildings.

== Career ==
In 1980, Green formed SL Green Properties, Inc. His strategy was to buy Class B office buildings, invest in remodeling their lobbies, facades, and amenity space, and then raise the rents closer to Class A levels as older tenants moved out. This strategy was successful, and SL Green Realty Corp. went public in 1997, trading on the New York Stock Exchange under the stock ticker of SLG. The company was the first REIT to be focused solely on Manhattan office properties. According to the SL Green Realty Corp. website, the company has investment interests in 77 Manhattan office buildings comprising nearly 40 million square feet of space.

In 2007, he bought Air America radio network and appointed his brother Mark Green as the network's president.

== Personal life ==
Green married Sandra Elaine Turboff (now Sandy Garfunkel) on June 21, 1961. They had three sons, Daniel Eric, Gary Michael, and Scott Tucker Green.

Green is married to Nancy Ann Peck, who runs Nancy Peck & Co, an interior design company. Nancy has a son by a previous marriage, Jonathan Peck.

Green is Jewish and participated in the 1985 and 1989 Maccabiah Games in Israel, winning a bronze medal in squash in 1985.

== Philanthropy ==
Green made the lead gift toward fundraising efforts for the $9 million, 20,000-square-foot (1,900 m^{2}) SL Green StreetSquash Center on West 115th Street in Harlem, which opened in 2008.
