= Lynn Perry Wooten =

American academic administrator

9th President of Simmons University
- Incumbent
- Assumed office July 1, 2020
- Preceded by: Helen Drinan

Personal details
- Spouse: David Wooten
- Children: 2
- Education: North Carolina A&T State University; Duke University; University of Michigan

Lynn Perry Wooten is an American academic administrator serving as the 9th president of Simmons University since 2020. She is its first Black president. Wooten was the David J. Nolan Dean and Professor of Management and Organizations at the Charles H. Dyson School of Applied Economics and Management at Cornell University from 2017 to 2020.

== Life ==
Wooten was raised in Philadelphia where she attended an all girls high school. She earned a B.S. in accounting in 1988 from North Carolina A&T State University. She completed a M.B.A. from Duke University Fuqua School of Business in 1990. In 1995, she earned a Ph.D. in business administration from the University of Michigan Ross School of Business. Her dissertation was titled, Strategic Management of Professional Service Firms: Balancing the Demands of Human Resource Management, Client Service, and Financial Performance. Stuart L. Hart was her doctoral advisor.

Wooten was an assistant professor of management at the Warrington College of Business. In 1998, she joined Ross School of Business as a faculty member. She later served as its senior associate dean for student and academic excellence. From 2017 to 2020, Wooten was the David J. Nolan Dean and Professor of Management and Organizations at the Charles H. Dyson School of Applied Economics and Management at Cornell University. On July 1, 2020, she succeeded Helen Drinan as the 9th president of Simmons University. She is its first Black president. Her investiture ceremony was delayed until April 11, 2022, due to the COVID-19 pandemic.

Wooten is married to marketing professor David Wooten. They have two children.
