= Advanced Engine Research =

British auto racing engine manufacturer

Advanced Engine Research, Ltd.
- Type: Private
- Industry: Auto racing
- Founded: 1997
- Headquarters: Basildon, Essex, England
- Products: Racing engines
- Website: aerltd.com

Advanced Engine Research, Ltd. (commonly known by the abbreviation AER) is an auto racing engine manufacturer based in Basildon, Essex, England. Established in 1997, AER has developed winning engines for a number of high-profile international race series in sports car, prototype racing, rallying, touring car, and open wheel racing. They have designed engines derived from road car platforms, but their emphasis is on clean sheet designed engines with a focus on electronics and turbochargers. Their engines have raced in the 24 Hours of Le Mans, the World Endurance Championship (WEC), the European Le Mans Series (ELMS), the IMSA SportsCar Championship, GP3, British Touring Car Championship (BTCC), Nissan/Renault World Series, Grand-Am, Paris Dakar and FIA Sportscar Championship. They have worked with a number of manufacturers including Mazda, Ford, Hyundai, MG/Rover, Nissan, and Toyota. In 2012, AER developed and built Formula One turbo test engines to current rules and in July 2012, AER was chosen as engine partner and supplier to the new GP3 racing series. They currently supply engines for the Indy NXT series.

== Products ==
AER offers a wide variety of technical services for customers, including design and analysis, manufacturing, engine assembly and testing. AER also provides a full package of engineers and personnel for race weekend support as well as electronics through their LifeRacing sister company. LifeRacing develops its own hardware and software including electronic engine controls (ECU), drive-by-wire controllers, and ancillary electronics and has aerospace contracts in addition to its racing activities.

AER has experience in a variety of engine technologies, with particular expertise in racing turbocharged engines. CATIA V5 is used for all component design work and there is an in-house prototyping machine shop with 5 axis machining and transient dynamometer equipment for engine testing.

The company was founded with an accent on its electronic capabilities to allow it to develop engines of a more sophisticated level for manufactures. This merging of electronic and mechanical aspects of engine design led to their first contract in 1997 with Nissan for British Touring Car engines. AER developed the engine in six months. Since 1997, AER has developed a number of different engine families for customers.

=== SR20 ===
Evolution of the Nissan SR20 road car engine tuned for the Supertouring regulations, it was used by Ray Mallock, Ltd. in the works Nissan Primera in the British Touring Car Championship from 1997 to 1999, taking the manufacturers title in 1998 and 1999, and the 1999 drivers title with Laurent Aïello at the wheel.

The engine was also used in the Crawford Racing Nissans in the Swedish Touring Car Championship, taking the title in 2000 with Tommy Rustad. With the demise of Supertouring, the AER-tuned SR20 was used in the short-lived World Series Light, a junior division to the Nissan World Series.

=== P25 ===
The AER P25 3.5 liter V6 is based on the production Nissan VQ35 engine as found in the Nissan 350Z. It was extensively re-engineered, originally for use in the Nissan World Series. The changes include a bespoke dry sump conversion, pistons, connecting rods, crankshaft, camshafts and valve gear. The P25 is used in single seat and sportscar applications with power output to 500 HP.

=== P14 ===
The AER P14 is a V6 engine developed from a production Nissan VQ engine. The P14 was homologated for use in sportscars fitting in the SR2 category of the FIA Sportscar Championship. Engines in this series were required to be at a maximum of 3.0 liters and based on production units.

=== P03/07 ===
Created in 2000, the P03 was AER's first clean sheet engine and was developed for MG/Rover for their Le Mans racing efforts. When they backed away from their Le Mans effort after a year, AER took the engine and developed it into a customer engine, the P07. The P07 was a 2.0 liter inline-4 with a single Garrett turbocharger, producing over 500 HP initially and 550 HP by 2003. The engine ran strongly through 2007 in the American Le Mans Series and Le Mans Series, as well as the 24 Hours of Le Mans, in the LMP2 class. In 2003, Dyson Racing took the ALMS P2 team and driver's (Chris Dyson) championships with their AER-powered MG-Lola EX257.

=== P32T ===
Launched in 2006, the new P32T helped AER move to the top of Le Mans Prototype racing. The P32T V8 engine was a bespoke AER design for LMP1 racing and was a 75 degree twin-turbo V8 originally built as a 3.6 liter in 2006 and 2007 and upgraded to 4.0 liters in 2008, called the P32C. Two Garrett turbochargers helped the engine put out more than 650 HP. A naturally aspirated variant, the P32, was designed with a range of 3.4 – 4.2 liters with the 3.4 liter designed for the 2011 LMP1 rules package. The P32T engine project sprang from a conversation Dyson Racing had with AER and during its first season was reliable and quick, winning numerous pole positions. It ran in LMP1 cars competing at the 24 Hours of Le Mans, the ELMS and ALMS.

The engine was designed to take on Audi’s LMP1 3.6 liter twin turbo and its clean sheet design set new standards for size and weight using Formula One technology and weighed only 114 kg.

Dyson Racing in America and Chamberlain-Synergy Motorsport in Europe initially used the P32T in 2006, while in 2007 Courage Compétition became a customer while Team Cytosport ran Dyson's former AER-powered prototype. In 2008, Intersport Racing ran the engine in their ALMS LMP1 entries and in 2009 and 2010, both Intersport Racing and Autocon ran the AER engine in ALMS P1.

=== MZR-R ===
The P41 was the first Mazda engine that AER had developed, which was accomplished in conjunction with Mazdaspeed for use in LMP2. An in-line four-cylinder single-turbocharged 2.0 liter, the MZR-R was debuted by B-K Motorsports at the 2007 12 Hours of Sebring, and B-K ran it through 2008. Dyson Racing took up the Mazda flag in 2009. The four-cylinder P41 was based on the structure of AER's 3.6 liter twin-turbo P32T V8 engine. In 2010 the P41 was replaced with the new P70 with a new block and cylinder head and increased power for use in LMP1. The engine represented the state of the art in turbocharged engine technology and was designed for the rigors of a 24-hour race. It is the smallest engine in LMP1, but on a per cylinder basis, the engine produces more power than a Formula One engine. In 2011, Dyson Racing swept the championship table in the ALMS P1 category with driver, team and manufacturer championships. Dyson Racing continues to run the engine and for 2013, the engine has been upgraded for wider power and torque curves and is called the P90.

The MZR-R was selected to power the new Indy Lights car that will debut in 2015, it will be badged as a Mazda engine.

=== P60 ===
AER P60 engine

Overview
- Manufacturer: Advanced Engine Research
- Production: 2014–2019

Layout
- Configuration: V6, twin-turbocharged, 90° cylinder angle
- Displacement: 2.0 L (2,000 cc)–2.4 L (2,398 cc)
- Cylinder block material: Aluminium
- Cylinder head material: Aluminium
- Valvetrain: 24-valve (four-valves per cylinder), DOHC

Combustion
- Fuel system: Gasoline direct injection
- Management: Life Racing
- Oil system: Dry sump

Output
- Power output: 500 hp (373 kW; 507 PS)–720 hp (537 kW; 730 PS)

Dimensions
- Dry weight: 115 lb (52 kg)

The P60 was introduced in 2014, in response to new LMP1 regulations brought forth by the Automobile Club de l'Ouest (ACO) for the FIA World Endurance Championship. It was designed with the goal of high efficiency fuel consumption at the forefront. The V6, twin-turbocharged engine has a displacement of 2.0 litres with direct fuel injection and a Life Racing engine control unit. The P60 made its debut in the Kodewa CLM P1/01 at the 2014 6 Hours of Circuit of the Americas. The following year, the engine was also used in the Rebellion Racing Rebellion R-One.

Following the reveal of the SMP Racing BR Engineering BR1 for the 2018–19 FIA World Endurance Championship season, AER announced an updated version, called the P60B. The engine includes updates to the high-pressure fuel system, cylinder head casting, scavenge system/oil tank, ignition system and engine calibration, while also increasing displacement to 2.4 litres. For the 2019–20 FIA World Endurance Championship season, the Team LNT Ginetta G60-LT-P1, was fitted with an upgraded engine focusing on reliability, called the P60C.

== Racing success ==
AER engines have won a number of championships and major races:

=== 1999 ===
- 1999 British Touring Car Championship driver, manufacturer and team championships with Laurent Aiello and Vodafone Nissan Racing (SR20).
- 1999 British Touring Car Championship independents championship with Matt Neal and Team Dynamics (SR20).

=== 2000 ===
- 2000 British Touring Car Championship independents championship with Matt Neal and Team Dynamics (SR20)
- 2000 Swedish Touring Championship driver championship with Tommy Rustad and Elgh Motorsport (SR20).
- 2000 Sports Racing World Cup SRL team championship with Redman Bright (P14).
- 2000 24 Hours of Le Mans LMP675 class winner with Multimatic Motorsports (P14).
- 2000 Grand American Road Racing Championship SRII driver, manufacturer and team championships with Archangel Motorsports (P14).

=== 2001 ===
- 2001 FIA Sportscar Championship SR2 team and drivers championships with SportsRacing Team Sweden and Larry Oberto and Thed Bjork (P14).
- 2001 Grand American Road Racing Championship SRII driver, manufacturer and team championships with Andy Lally and Archangel Motorsports (P14).
- 2001 American Le Mans Series manufacturer champion. (P14).
- 2001 24 Hours of Daytona SRPII class winner with Archangel Motorsports (P41)

=== 2002 ===
- 2002 American Le Mans Series LMP675 driver, manufacturer, and team championships with Jon Field and KnightHawk Racing (P07).
- 2002 12 Hours of Sebring LMP675 class winners of the 12 Hours of Sebring and ten hour Petit Le Mans with Intersport Racing
- 2002 Grand American Road Racing Championship SRPII driver, manufacturer and team championships with Terry Borcheller and Rand Racing (P14).
- 2002 24 Hours of Le Mans: AER powered cars qualified first, second and third in LMP675 (P07)
- 2002 Telefónica World Series by Nissan: AER builds engines and supports 37 cars in Formula Nissan 2000 (P14).

=== 2003 ===
- 2003 FIA Sportscar Championship SR2 team championship with Lucchini Engineering (P14).
- 2003 American Le Mans Series LMP675 team and manufacturer championships with Chris Dyson and Dyson Racing (P07).
- 2003 24 Hours of Daytona SRII class winner with Team Seattle/Essex Racing (P14 engine).
- 2003 12 Hours of Sebring LMP675 class winner with Dyson Racing (P07).
- 2003 Sonoma: first LMP675 car to take pole and win overall in an ALMS race with Dyson Racing (P07).
- 2003 Superfund WorldSeries by Nissan: design, manufacture and track support for Nissan 3.0 liter V6 series.
- 2003 World Series Lights: design, manufacturer and track support for 2.0 liter series.

=== 2004 ===
- 2004 American Le Mans Series LMP675 team championship with Miracle Motorsports (P14 and P07).
- 2004 Le Mans Endurance Series LMP675 team championship with Courage Compétition (P07).
- 2004 Superfund World Series by Nissan: design, manufacture and track support for Nissan 3.0 liter V6 series.
- 2004 World Series Lights: design, manufacture and track support for 2.0 liter series.

=== 2005 ===
- 2005 American Le Mans Series LMP2 driver, manufacturer and team championships with Intersport Racing (P07).
- 2005 European Le Mans Endurance Series LMP2 driver, manufacturer and team championships with Gareth Evans and Chamberlain-Synergy Motorsports (P07).

=== 2006 ===
- 2006 European Le Mans Series LMP2 teams champion with Barazi-Epsilon (P07). AER-powered cars take all the season's poles and wins.
- 2006 24 Hours of Le Mans LMP2 class winner with RML Racing. (P07).

=== 2007 ===
- 2007 European Le Mans Series LMP2 drivers, manufacturer and team championships with RML Racing and Mike Newton and Thomas Erdos.

=== 2009 ===
- 2009 American Le Mans Series LMP2 pole and win at ten-hour Petit Le Mans and Lime Rock race win for Dyson Racing (P70).
- 2009 Asian Le Mans Series two LMP2 wins with Pescarola-Mazda (P70).

=== 2010 ===
- 2010 American Le Mans Series LMP1 win at Mid-Ohio with Dyson Racing. First LMP1 win for Mazda, Dunlop, Castrol and the biofuel Isobutanol (P70).
- 2010 American Le Mans Series first place LMP1 points at ten-hour Petit Le Mans for Intersport Racing (P32T).

=== 2011 ===
- 2011 American Le Mans Series LMP1 driver, manufacturer, and team championships along with the Michelin Green X Challenge championship with Dyson Racing and Chris Dyson and Guy Smith

=== 2012 ===
- 2012 American Le Mans Series Dyson Racing first in ALMS points at the 12 Hours of Sebring and the ten-hour Petit Le Mans (P70).

=== 2019 ===
- 2019 World Endurance Championship|2019 World Endurance Championship SMP Racing 3rd place overall at the LeMans 24 Hours (P60C).
- 2019 IMSA Weathertech Sportscar Championship | Rolex 24 Hours of Daytona 2nd place overall
