= Charles Dyson =

American businessman and philanthropist

Charles Henry Dyson (August 2, 1909 – March 14, 1997) was an American businessman and philanthropist. He was founder of the Dyson Kissner-Moran Corporation founded in 1954 and the Dyson Foundation founded in 1957. He was one of the people listed on Richard Nixon's Enemies List in 1971.

== Career ==
=== Business ===
Dyson began his career in 1932 as an accountant at Price Waterhouse & Company. After a two-year tour as a chartered accountant in England with Price Waterhouse & Company, Dyson was rewarded by being named a manager when he returned to the United States in 1938. He remained with the company until he was recruited to government service for the Lend Lease Program. After the war, he returned to the business world as the Executive Vice President of Finance of the Textron Corporation under its founder, Royal (Roy) Little. In 1949, he moved to Burlington Mills Corporation where he served as vice president and Chief Financial Officer under President Spencer Love. In 1954, he founded the Dyson Corporation (now Dyson Kissner-Moran Corporation), a private investment firm specializing in acquisitions and mergers.

=== Military ===
Dyson was recruited by the Federal government as a civilian to help set up the procurement and record keeping for the Lend Lease Program. At the U.S. declaration of World War II, he was drafted into the same position as a lieutenant in the Army Air Force. During his military service, the War Department assigned him to the Treasury Department to assist the Treasury Secretary, Henry Morgenthau Jr. and Secretary of State, Dean Acheson, at the United Nations Monetary and Financial Conference in Bretton Woods, New Hampshire. The UNMFC was created to set the post-war exchange rates for world currencies, principally the dollar, franc, pound, and the German mark. For his diverse and distinguished service, Dyson was awarded the Distinguished Service Medal.

== Other ventures ==
=== Philanthropy ===
In 1957, Dyson and wife Margaret Dyson (1914–1990) created the Dyson Foundation, one of the wealthiest charities in the United States. In 2004, the foundation had approximately $295,000,000 in assets and awarded over $16.3 million in grants.

A 1930 graduate of New York's Pace University (then the Pace Institute), Dyson has been a generous benefactor for his alma mater. The Dyson College of Arts and Sciences at Pace University and "Dyson Hall" in Pleasantville, NY, are named in his honor.

There is a Margaret M. and Charles H. Dyson Atrium at Cornell University in Sage Hall, part of the Samuel Curtis Johnson Graduate School of Management and a Margaret M. and Charles H. Dyson Center at Marist College, which houses the School of Management and the School of Social and Behavioral Sciences.

In June 2010, Cornell University received a $25 million donation from the Dyson family which would be used to make improvements to the university's School of Applied Economics and Management. In Dyson's honor, the department was renamed the Charles Dyson School of Applied Economics and Management. In addition, some of the funds would also go towards scholarships.

He was elected to the Common Cause National Governing Board in 1973.

== Personal life ==
Dyson and his wife, Margaret MacGregor Dyson, had four children, John Stuart (b. 1943), Robert Richard (b. 1946), Anne Elizabeth (b. 1947), and Peter Lawrence (b. 1951). Charles Dyson died on March 14, 1997. He was 88 years old.
