= John S. Dyson =

American businessman

John Stuart Dyson is a political and business leader in New York. He serves as the chairman of Millbrook Capital Management and has been active in businesses for a number of years. He is an alumnus of Cornell University and holds a master's degree from Princeton University. He was Commissioner of Commerce during the creation of the tourism advertising campaign "I Love New York", by his deputy, William S. Doyle.

== Political career ==
Dyson attended Cornell University's College of Agriculture and Life Sciences, where he was a member of Alpha Delta Phi fraternity. He graduated in 1965. He spent a decade in New York state government, including four years in the Cabinet of Gov. Hugh Carey. In April 1975, Carey appointed Dyson as Commissioner of Agriculture and Markets. In December 1975, Dyson was appointed by Carey to serve as Commissioner of Commerce, which put him in charge of economic development and tourism. While serving as Commerce Commissioner, the "I Love New York" campaign was founded. In 1979, Dyson left the Commerce Department when Carey appointed him Chairman of the New York Power Authority, which runs a series of power plants around New York State, including a large hydroelectric plant in Niagara Falls. Dyson was retained as Power Authority Chairman by Gov. Mario Cuomo and served until 1985.

In 1986, Dyson ran for the Democratic nomination for the U.S. Senate as a moderate Democrat, a race Cuomo encouraged him to undertake. Despite spending over $6 million and being endorsed by several state Democratic leaders, including New York City mayor Ed Koch and city council president Andrew Stein, Dyson lost the Democratic nomination to consumer advocate Mark Green, who only spent about $800,000. However, Dyson remained on the ballot as the nominee of the Liberal Party of New York.

In 1994, Dyson was appointed as Deputy Mayor of New York City by Mayor Rudy Giuliani. As deputy mayor, Dyson was in charge of economic development and finance for the city. He served as deputy mayor until 1996, when he returned to private life. He continued to serve in the Giuliani Administration from 1996 to 2002 in the part-time position of Chairman of the Mayor's Council of Economic Advisors. In the economic advisors chairmanship, Dyson worked on economic issues impacting the city following the September 11 terrorist attacks on the World Trade Center. From 1981 to 2001, Dyson was an appointee of the Governor of New York on the Board of Trustees of Cornell University. He was the primary donor for the Applied Economics and Management program, Charles H. Dyson School of Applied Economics and Management, named after Dyson's father.

=== Electoral history ===
1986 U.S. Senate election in New York
Party	Candidate	Votes	%
Republican	Al D'Amato (incumbent)	2,378,197	56.90%
Democratic	Mark Green	1,723,216	41.23%
Liberal	John S. Dyson	60,099	1.44%
New Alliance	Fred Newman	10,559	0.25%
Socialist Workers	Michael Shur	7,376	0.18%
Total votes		4,179,447	100%
Republican hold			

New York's 28th congressional district election, 1968
Party	Candidate	Votes	%
Republican	Hamilton Fish IV	91,590	48.15%
Democratic	John S. Dyson	86,827	45.64%
Conservative	G. Gordon Liddy	9,414	4.95%
Liberal	Peter Kane Dufault	2,399	1.26%
Total votes		190,230	100%
Republican gain from Democratic			

== Winery business ==
Dyson is the owner of Millbrook Vineyards and Winery in Millbrook, New York, Williams Selyem Winery in the Russian River Valley, California, and Villa Pillo in Tuscany, Italy. In 2020 he sold a minority share of Williams Selyem Winery to Domaine Faiveley, the family-owned Burgundy winemakers.

Party political offices
Preceded by Jacob Javits	Liberal nominee for U.S. Senator from New York (Class 3); 1986	Succeeded by Robert Abrams
