= Dyson School of Applied Economics and Management =

Business school at Cornell University

Charles H. Dyson School of Applied Economics and Management
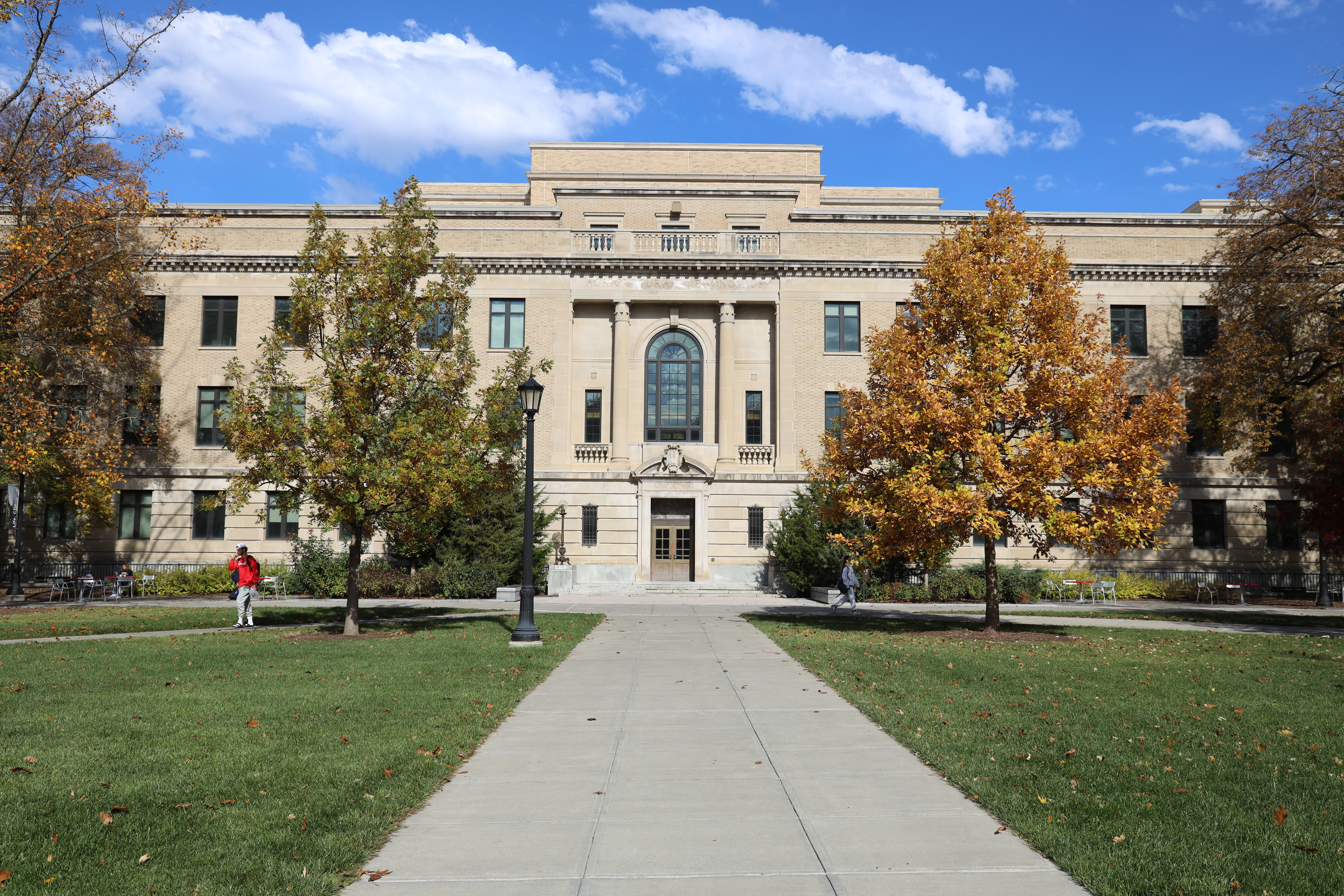
- The Dyson School is primarily housed in Warren Hall.
- Established: 1911
- Affiliations: Cornell University
- Endowment: $62 million
- Faculty: 68
- Undergraduates: 708
- Postgraduates: 107
- Location: Ithaca, New York, USA
- Dean: Jinhua Zhao
- Website: dyson.cornell.edu

The Charles H. Dyson School of Applied Economics and Management is the Department of Applied Economics and Management and one of two undergraduate business colleges within the Cornell SC Johnson College of Business at Cornell University, a private Ivy League university located in Ithaca, New York.

The school was officially named in 2010 after a $25 million gift from John S. Dyson ’65, of Millbrook Capital Management, to establish the department in honor of his father Charles Dyson. The school focuses on business, agribusiness, environmental and resource economics, and international and development economics offering a Bachelor of Science in Applied Economics and Management and three graduate degrees, M.S., M.P.S. and Ph.D, in Applied Economics and Management. As of 2017, the Dyson School has 64 full-time faculty and 17 lecturers or adjunct faculty. In 2015, there were 104 graduate students and 735 undergraduates in the Dyson School.

== Academics ==
The department offers one undergraduate major, Applied Economics and Management, which is an AACSB accredited undergraduate business program. Dyson earned a 2nd-place ranking in Poets & Quants Best Undergraduate Business Programs of 2025. In fact, U.S. News & World Report ranked Dyson's business program #7 in its 2018 rankings of top undergraduate business programs. In addition, BusinessWeek's 2014 "Best Undergraduate Business Schools" rankings placed Cornell as the third best program in the country (a ranking it has held for 3 years). Historically, the program has undergone a series of developments regarding the focus of its studies. Originally conceived as an agriculturally-centered program, it has developed over the years to focus on both resource economics, applied economics, international and development economics, as well as general management.

Undergraduate students may choose one of eleven specializations: Accounting, Agribusiness Management, Applied Economics, Business Analytics, Entrepreneurship, Environment, Energy, and Resource Economics, Finance, Food Industry Management, International Trade and Development, Marketing, and Strategy.

Also, the graduate field of Applied Economics and Management (AEM) in the Charles H. Dyson School of Applied Economics and Management offers 3 degrees: the research-based doctor of philosophy (PhD) degree, master of science (MS) degree, and master of professional studies (MPS) degree. Graduate students may choose from four subject areas: Environmental, Energy, and Resource Economics; Food and Agricultural Economics; International and Development Economics; and Management.

Business school rankings

United States
- USNWR MBA: 9

In the Fall of 2015, the school had 92 incoming freshmen, and approximately 110 transfer students, 45 external transfers and 75 Intra-Cornell transfers. The admittance rate in Fall of 2018 for freshmen, being the most selective at Cornell University, was 2.9%.

== Finances ==
The program is endowed by a $25 million gift from the Dyson family. It also receives annual state appropriations through the SUNY budget. As is the case with all students in the College of Agriculture and Life Sciences, in-state students pay a lower tuition than do out-of-state students. The program is based in Warren Hall which is owned and maintained by New York State. The unit also helps provide farms and businesses in New York with useful information regarding agricultural economics as a part of Cornell's cooperative extension program. The school publishes an annual New York Economic Handbook as well as Extension Bulletins.

== List of deans ==
- Lynn Perry Wooten 2017-2020

== See also ==
- Cornell Johnson Graduate School of Management, Cornell's graduate business school
- Economics
- Glossary of economics
