= Dyson Racing =

Professional sports car racing team

(United States) Dyson Racing
- Founded: 1974
- Team principal(s): Rob Dyson; Michael White
- Current series: Trans-Am Series
- Former series: American Le Mans Series; Rolex Sports Car Series; Can Am; Indy Car; IMSA GT Championship; Pirelli World Challenge
- Drivers' Championships: Chris Dyson; Guy Smith; Butch Leitzinger; Matt McMurry

Dyson Racing is a professional sports car racing team based in Poughkeepsie, New York in the United States. Founded by Rob Dyson in 1974, the team competed successfully in North American sports car racing series, including the IMSA GT Championship and American Le Mans Series.

== Racing History ==
=== SCCA: 1974-82 ===
Team founder Rob Dyson started his racing career in the Sports Car Club of America (SCCA) in 1974 with a Datsun 510 sedan with a pit crew of one: his wife Emilie. He won his first race, a regional at the Watkins Glen road course in New York. He moved up to SCCA nationals in 1977, adding Pat Smith as crew chief and won a national championship in 1981 with a Nissan 200SX.

=== IMSA GTO: 1983-84 ===
Rob Dyson’s first professional race was at Lime Rock Park in Connecticut with a 1983 Firebird. He ran the Firebird in nine races in the International Motorsports Association (IMSA) GTO class and selected Trans Am races with a best finish of third in class at the 1983 Elkhart Lake 500 miler.

Dyson formed a close relationship with Goodyear during this time that began with modest radial tire development and would eventually grow to a full-scale tire support program that would prove essential to the team over an unprecedented 20-year run of success.

=== IMSA GTP: 1985-88 ===
Rob Dyson bought a Porsche 962 (chassis 101) from privateer Bruce Leven. He and co-driver Drake Olson won their first race at Lime Rock Park in May 1985, even though they were running the smaller 2.8-liter engine compared to the other 962s' 3.2-liter engines. The team went on to win two more races with Olson winning the inaugural Porsche Cup of North America. It was the first of four consecutive Porsche Cups for the Dyson team.

The team took home three more IMSA GTP wins in both 1986 and 1987 with Price Cobb placing second in the championship both years. In 1986, Rob Dyson was named Most Improved Driver and Pat Smith Mechanic of the Year. James Weaver joined Dyson Racing in 1987, won his debut race at Road Atlanta with Cobb, and from 1988 onwards the Englishman drove for the team until his retirement twenty years later.

1988 was the year of eight in a row wins for the Nissan GTP ZX Turbo. Dyson Racing had two of the three wins for Porsche that year – at Miami in February and San Antonio in September. The San Antonio win, scored with Dyson's unique 962-DR1 chassis, ended Nissan’s win streak.

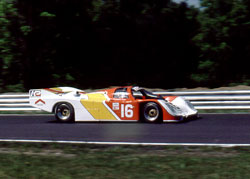
1985 Lime Rock

=== IMSA GTP / Indy Car: 1989 ===
Adding an open-wheel racing program to the IMSA program, James Weaver and John Paul Jr. ran four CART races in a Lola T88/00 Cosworth, with a best finish of eleventh at Long Beach, CA.

Rob Dyson and John Paul Jr. drove the IMSA GTP race at their home track of Lime Rock, CT in their Porsche 962.

=== IMSA GTP: 1990-93 ===
Dyson Racing renewed its partnership with Porsche as Porsche North America's factory-supported team in 1990. Assisted by engine builder Andial and employing improved aerodynamics with the Porsche 962C-148, the team had four podiums and Porsche’s only win of the year at the Tampa, FL race. The Tampa World Challenge race would be the team's final victory in IMSA GTP. The team developed an in-house chassis (DR2) based on the 962C in 1991, but with only limited success the organization felt a regroup was necessary.

Talks with Mazda about a partnership in GTP for 1992 did not bear fruit and the team sat out the entire 1992 IMSA season – the first since 1974 that did not see Rob Dyson behind the wheel. The team resurrected their Porsche 962C-148 for Rob Dyson, James Weaver, Price Cobb and Elliott Forbes-Robinson for the final GTP-era Daytona 24 Hours in February 1993, finishing fifth overall and second in GTP. Keeping the core team employed, Dyson Racing also ran six Firestone Indy Lights races with James Weaver.

=== WSC: 1994-98 ===
Dyson Racing rejoined IMSA to compete in the inaugural World Sportscar Championship (WSC) in 1994. For that season, the team ran a Spice chassis with a production-based Ferrari 348 V8 engine in nine races, with a highlight being a third at Indianapolis Raceway Park. The car had a great sound but was down on power compared to the thoroughbred Ferrari 333SP machines and the team made the decision to be the first to commit to the new Riley & Scott MkIII in 1995.

Using Ford V8 power with engines provided by Lozano Brothers Porting, the team won with the car's third time out at Road Atlanta. James Weaver took the championship down to the season finale at New Orleans, taking pole and the victory (the team's first one-two finish) but early season woes at Daytona and Sebring meant that Weaver finished two points adrift in the championship. The team continued to run two cars in 1996 with three wins and Butch Leitzinger coming in third in the WSC championship. Butch Leitzinger won the IMSA WSC driver titles in 1997 and 1998 and James Weaver won the United States Road Racing Championship (USRRC) Can-Am championship in 1998. 1997 was their best year to date. It started with their first win in the Daytona 24 Hours and ended with six wins total. Butch Leitzinger was first, Elliott Forbes-Robinson second and James Weaver third in the IMSA Drivers’ Championship and the team won its first Team Championship.

=== ALMS & USRRC: 1999 ===
The team competed with its R&S Mk. III-Fords (now with a larger capacity V8) and won titles in two different series again in 1999. Elliott Forbes-Robinson won the inaugural American Le Mans Series (ALMS), while Elliott Forbes-Robinson and Butch Leitzinger shared the shortened USRRC championship and the team won their second Daytona 24 Hour race. The team started the inaugural 1999 ALMS season with a thrilling second-place finish in the 12 Hours of Sebring, the closest finish in that race's history.

=== Grand-Am: 2000-02 ===
The team had committed early to the new Reynard 2KQ chassis to defend their ALMS title but early testing at Daytona showed it far off the pace and the chassis was jettisoned immediately. Dyson Racing resurrected the Riley and Scott Fords and won the inaugural Grand American Road Racing Association (Grand-Am) SR1 Championship with James Weaver. Highlights included a class win at the Daytona 24 Hours and four wins, including the Six Hours of Watkins Glen. The team repeated their 2000 Grand-Am championships in 2001, with six wins and another Team Championship. James Weaver once again claimed the driver's title and Butch Leitzinger came second. The team continued its dominance in its last full year in Grand-Am in 2002 with seven series wins and first in the Team Championship. Chris Dyson, who had made his team debut at the 2001 Watkins Glen International 250, finished second in the 2002 Driver's championship with five wins and claimed Rookie of the Year honors. Despite scoring no points at the Rolex 24 Hours, Dyson missed winning the title by only two points.

All told the team's Riley and Scott MkIII cars claimed thirty-eight victories, with two overall and two class wins at the Daytona 24 Hours, between 1995 and 2002.

== American Le Mans Series ==
=== 2001-02 (Riley & Scott) ===
Seeking the missing jewel in the team's crown, the 12 Hours of Sebring, the team committed to Riley and Scott's latest creation, the Mk3C, in 2001, introducing it at the 12 Hours of Sebring. This coincided with the return of a brace of factory and customer Audi R8s. The Audi showed its superiority from its first race on. A strong drive by James Weaver, Butch Leitzinger and Elliott Forbes-Robinson saw the Dyson Riley and Scott Lincoln finish third overall and ahead of three other Audi R8s at Sebring. The team entered three additional ALMS events in 2001 but the Mk3C could not match the Audis' race-winning pace and the team stopped racing that car at the end of the season.

Shifting back to the venerable R&S Mk3A, Chris Dyson made his ALMS debut at the season-opening 12 Hours of Sebring in 2002, co-driving with Rob Dyson and Dorsey Schroeder. It was Rob Dyson's final IMSA race and appearance in a team car at the 12 Hours of Sebring. Leitzinger, Weaver, and EFR had another strong run at Sebring, finishing 4th in a design entering its 8th season of service.

=== 2002-06 (Lola) ===
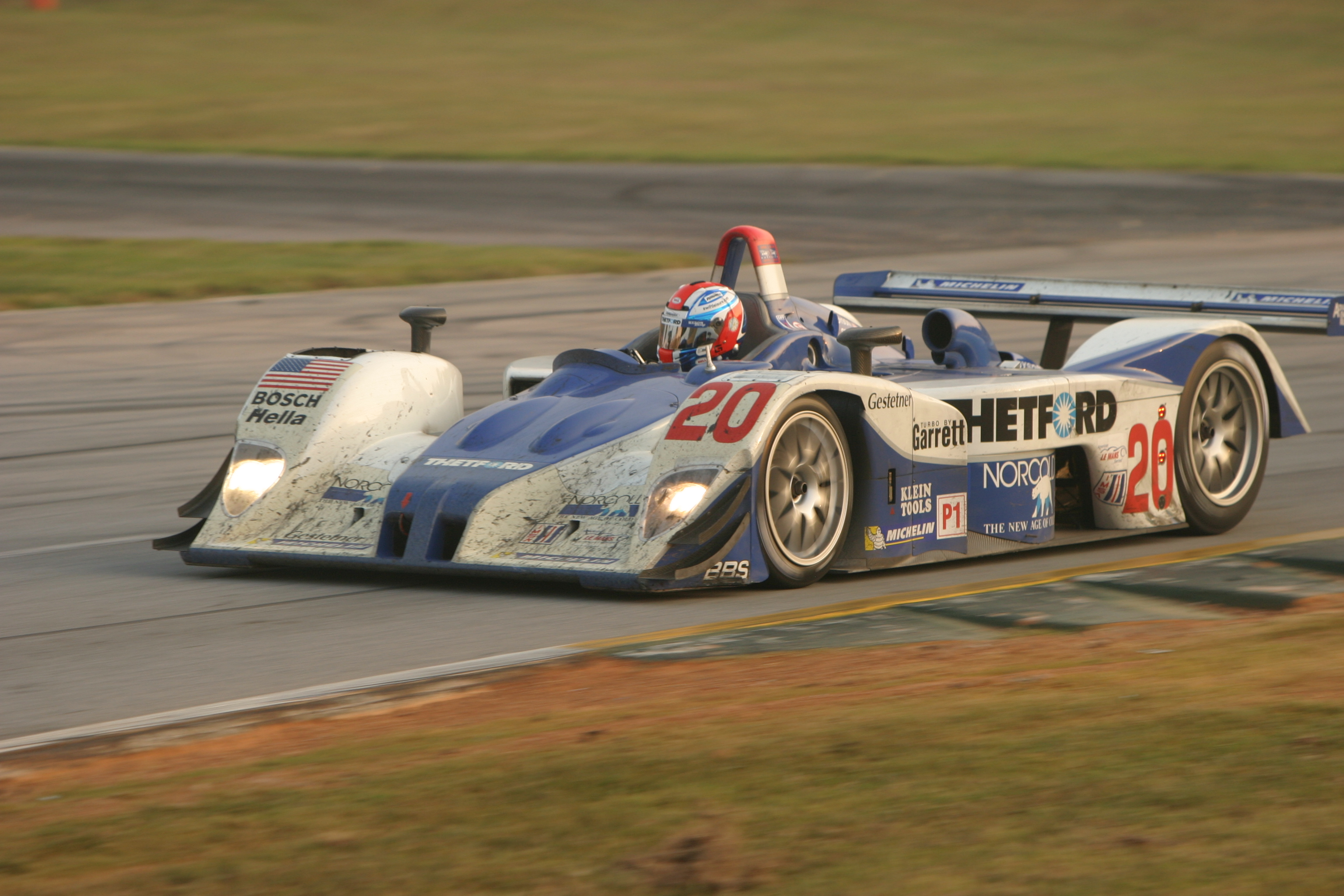
Dyson Racing at Road Atlanta.

Mid-season in 2002, the team introduced the Lola EX257/MG, in preparation for a full-season assault on the LMP675 title in 2003 and once again to win overall IMSA series victories. This was the start of long-term successful partnership with Lola and engine builder Advanced Engine Research (AER). AER/MG took home first in the 2002 LMP675 Engine Manufacturers’ Championship. The "giant-killing" package immediately showed promise and ran in contention for the overall lead with the Audis at the Petit Le Mans.

The 2003 season saw Weaver and Leitzinger scored a triumphant overall win at Sonoma against the larger Audi R8s running in the LMP900 class. It was the first time an LMP675 class car had ever won an ALMS event overall and was also a one-two in class for the team. In total, there were five class wins for the year including the team's first honors at 12 Hours of Sebring for Chris Dyson, Chad Block and Didier de Radigues. By season's end, the team had won the LMP675 team championship, whereas Chris Dyson finished first in the drivers championship.

With a realignment of ALMS regulations, the team moved their two largely unchanged Lola-AERs up to the LMP1 class for 2004. Weaver and Leitzinger took a memorable win at Mosport and the 16 and 20 cars between them accounted for eleven podium finishes. The Portland ALMS race was particularly hard-fought with Chris Dyson holding off reigning LMP1 champion JJ Lehto in the Audi R8 for more than half the race. The team finished the season 2nd in the championship with drivers James Weaver and Butch Leitzinger second and Andy Wallace third in the championship.

In 2005, Dyson Racing once again entered two full-time Lola B01/60-AERs in the ten-race championship. The team had switched to Michelin tires in the offseason. With near-perfect reliability, the team began its 2005 campaign strongly at Sebring and scored its first ALMS LMP1 one-two finish for the team at Mid-Ohio. Weaver and Leitzinger also won at Mosport. The 12 Hours of Sebring marked the first Dyson race for Guy Smith, who from the Petit Le Mans later that year and onwards would continue to co-drive full-time with Chris Dyson. The team finished second behind rivals, Champion Racing in the teams championship with Chris Dyson second in the Drivers Championship.

The team ran the 2006 ALMS season with two new Lola B06/10-AER LMP1 cars against the new diesel-powered Audi R10s which debuted at the 12 Hours of Sebring (Audi ran the older R8s at the next three races before going back to the R10). The team finished second in the LMP1 Championship behind the factory Audi squad. James Weaver finished second in the championship and retired from active competition driving after the season's last race at Mazda Raceway Laguna Seca. He brought the car in first place at each of his pit stops during the Laguna race. The ALMS media guide called him “One of the world’s great racing drivers, no matter which discipline.” He spent twenty of his thirty-year career driving for Dyson Racing and continues to work with the team to this day as a consultant.

=== 2007-08 (Porsche) ===
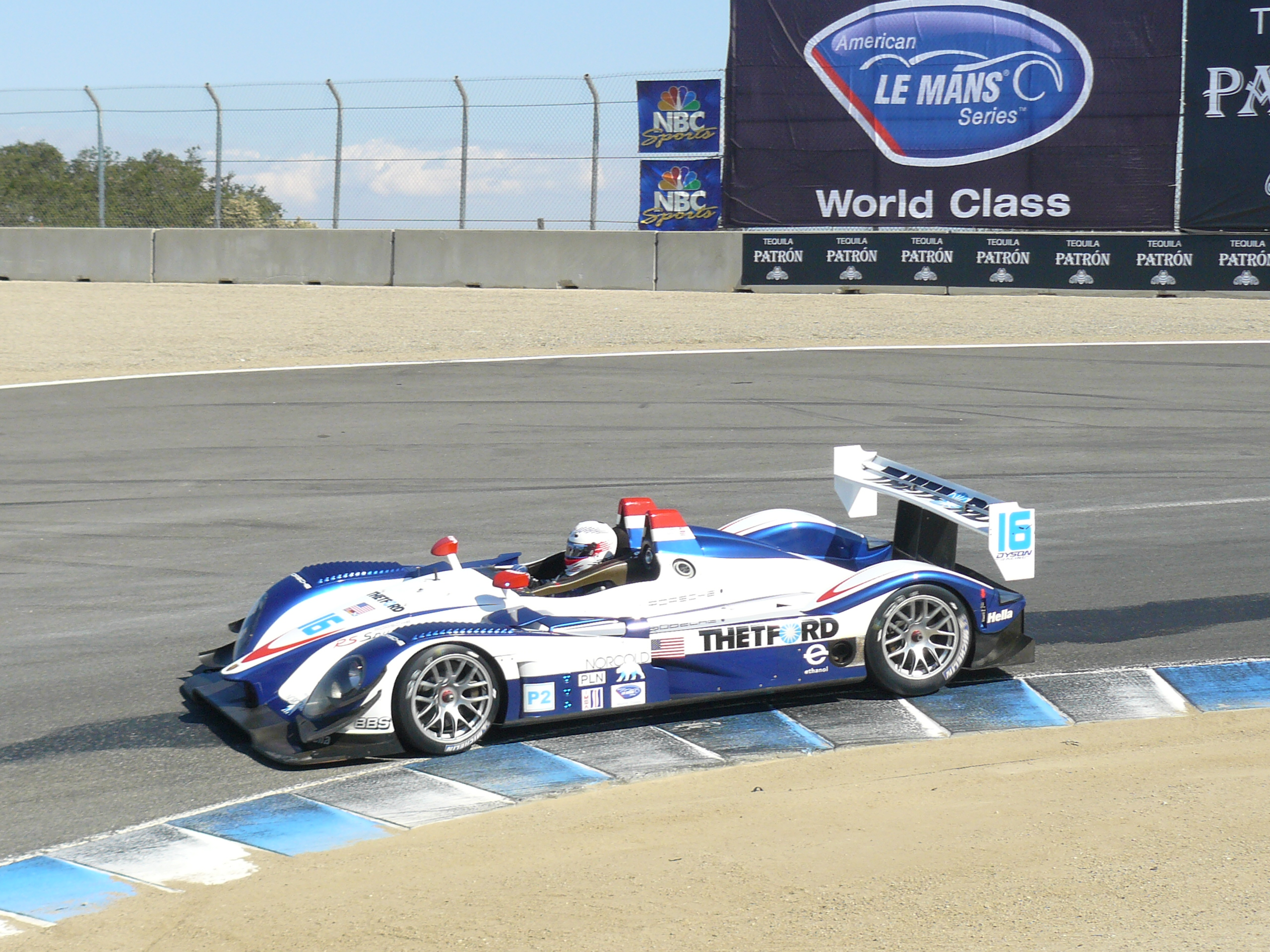
Dyson Racing's RS Spyder competing at Laguna Seca.

In 2007, the team renewed its historic relationship with Porsche and ran two brand new RS Spyders in the LMP2 class. Butch Leitzinger and Andy Wallace finished third in the hotly contested 2007 LMP2 drivers championship, four points ahead of teammates, Chris Dyson and Guy Smith's fourth place. Porsche swept the manufacturers' title, and Dyson Racing claimed 2nd in the team championship behind Penske Racing.

The 2008 season starting off with a strong second and third in class finish at the season-opening 12 Hours of Sebring. At year's end, the team finished third in the team championship and Marino Franchitti and Butch Leitzinger were fifth in the drivers’ standings followed by Chris Dyson and Guy Smith in sixth place. Porsche won the ALMS LMP2 Manufacturers championship by only one point over the four-car Acura effort.

=== 2009-13 (Mazda) ===
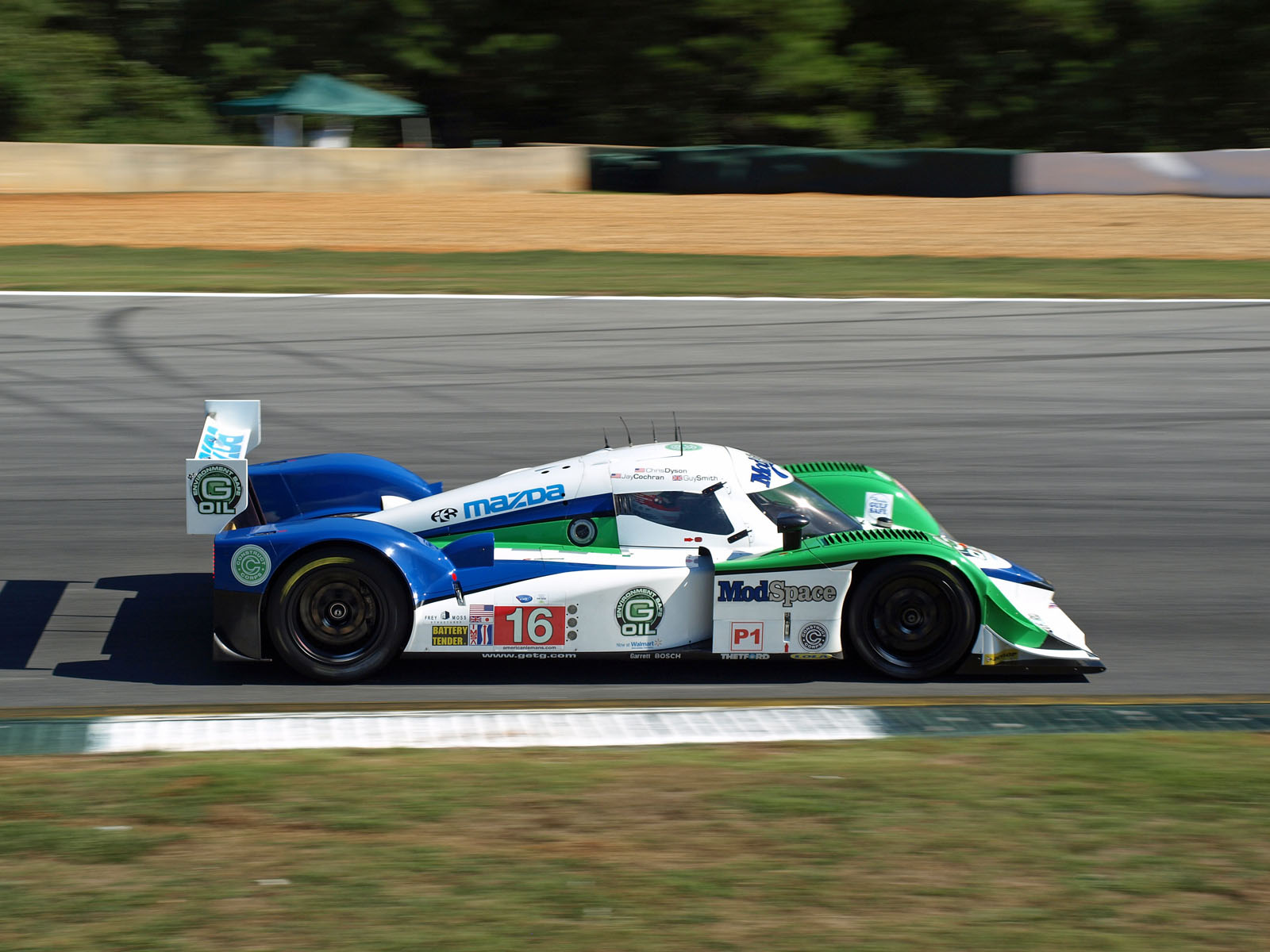
The team's Lola Mazda at 2011 Petit Le Mans.

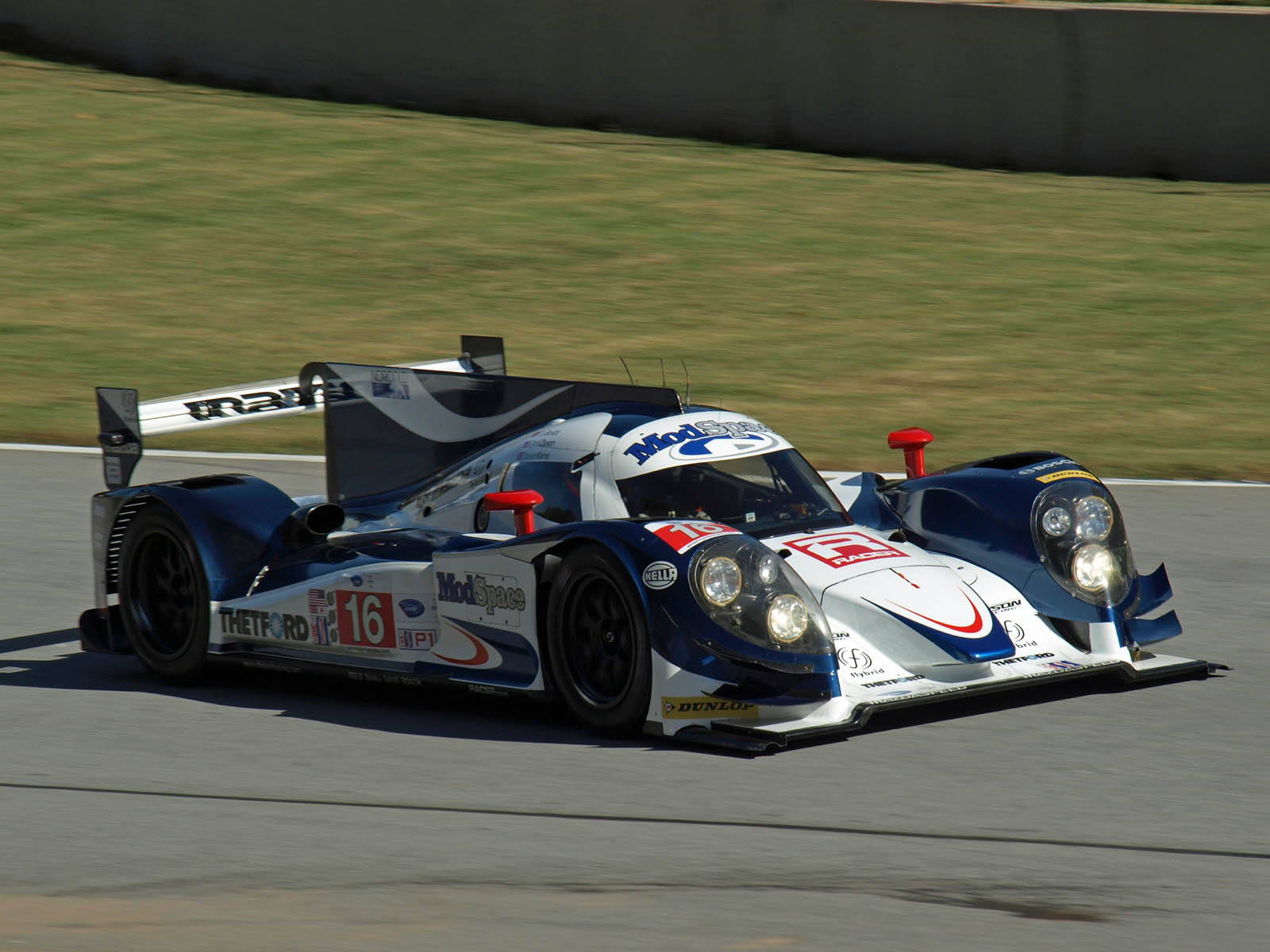
2012 Petit Le Mans.

With Porsche ending its factory support of its ALMS program at the conclusion of the 2008 ALMS season, the Dyson team was fortunate to strike up a partnership with Mazda to campaign two BP / Castrol-sponsored Lola B09/86 LMP2 cars for the 2009 season. This move rekindled the team's long standing relationship with Lola and Advanced Engine Research, who was responsible for the Mazda LMP2 MZR-R powerplant. The team claimed two class victories at Lime Rock Park and at the season ending Petit Le Mans race. The team ended the season 2nd in the team championship behind their main rivals, Fernandez Racing. Drivers Butch Leitzinger and Marino Franchitti finished 2nd in the drivers championship, while Chris Dyson and Guy Smith finished fourth.

The 2010 season saw the LMP1 and LMP2 classes combine to form one LMP class, creating very close competition amongst five distinctly different chassis-engine combinations. The Dyson team, now on Dunlop, was consistently one of the fastest cars on the track and Smith and Dyson put together a strong effort that was belied in the final points tally due to two non-points-scoring finishes. The highlight of the 2010 season was the overall win at Mid-Ohio in August. It was the first overall ALMS victory for Dyson, Mazda, Guy Smith, biofuel IsoButanol, Dunlop tires and Castrol. The team finished 4th in the LMP class championship with Chris Dyson 4th and Guy Smith 6th in the drivers championship.

The foundation laid in 2009 and 2010 came together in 2011. Together with Oryx Racing, the team claimed 5 class victories and 4 overall wins. The team took five pole positions, four fastest race laps and a total of thirteen podium finishes. By the end of the season, Dyson Racing had claimed 5 championship titles: Team Championship; Drivers Championship with Chris Dyson and Guy Smith; Engine Manufacturer with Mazda, the Tire title for Dunlop, plus the 2011 Michelin Green X Challenge.

For the 2012 season, the team, with drivers Dyson and Smith, would return to continue their rivalry with Muscle Milk Pickett Racing. The team would also field the #20 car with several different drivers for eight of the ten-race season. Throughout the season the team's Mazda powered Lolas lacked the outright speed of Muscle Milk's new HPD ARX-03. Mechanical troubles for the HPD, however, would give the Dyson Racing team overall victories at the Grand Prix of Baltimore and the Road America race where they won by 0.083 seconds, setting the record for the closest overall finish in ALMS history. By the end of the season, they would finish 2nd in the LMP1 Teams' Championships with Chris Dyson and Guy Smith 2nd in the Drivers' Championship. Dyson celebrated his 100th ALMS start at Baltimore and the team claimed their 200th podium at Mid-Ohio.

== Pirelli World Challenge ==
The team returned to action later in the 2014 Pirelli World Challenge with a Bentley Continental GT3. Butch Leitzinger entered five rounds and Guy Smith entered two rounds, claiming one win and three podiums. In 2015, Chris Dyson raced full-time, finishing 9th in points with one win and four podiums out of 20 races. Leitzinger entered seven rounds and Smith the other two, scoring a total of three podiums.
