= James Weaver (racing driver) =

British racing driver (born 1955)

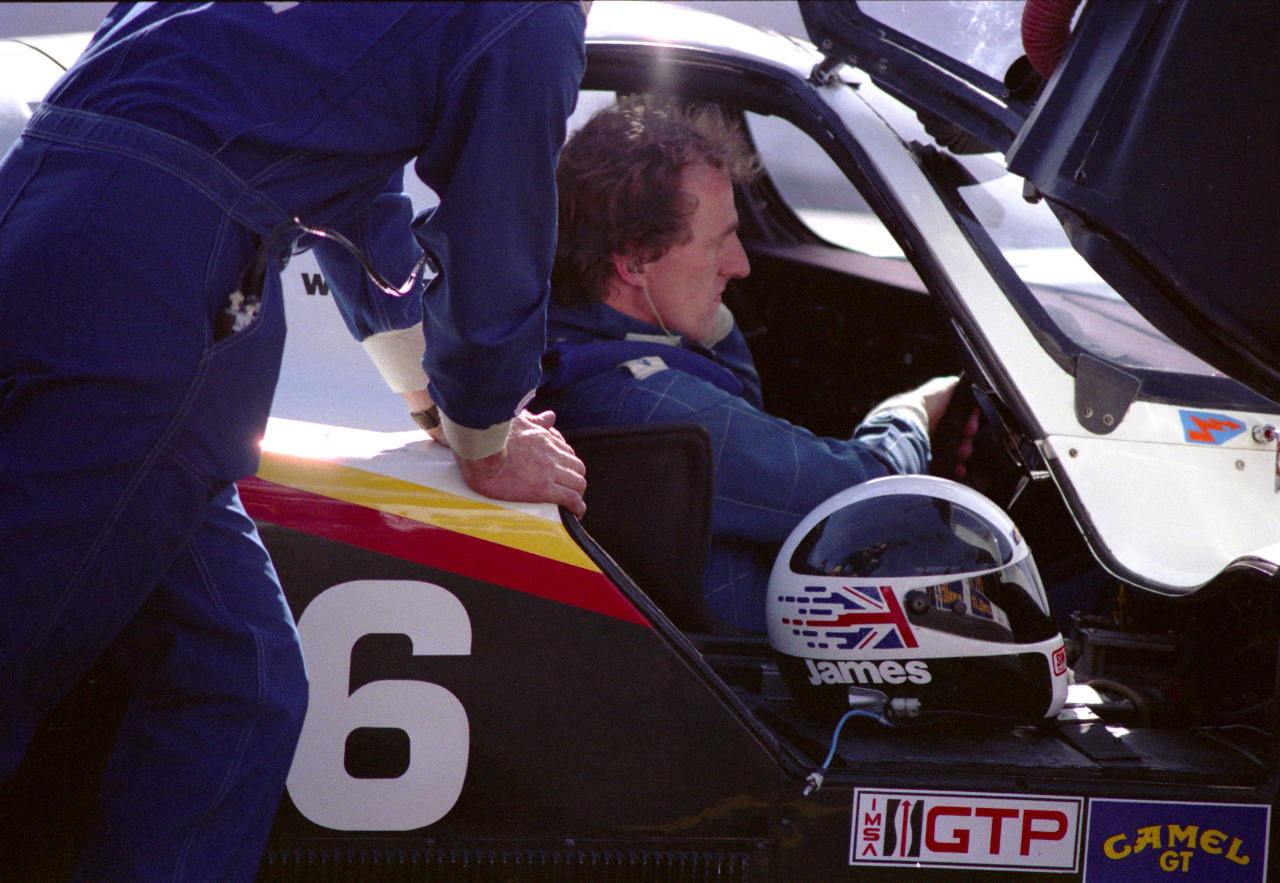
- Weaver in a Porsche 962 at the 1990 IMSA Del Mar Grand Prix
- Nationality: (United Kingdom) British
- Born: James Brian Weaver; 4 March 1955 (age 71) London, England

Championship titles
- 2000–2001 1999 1996: Grand-Am; USRRC; BPR Global GT Series

James Brian Weaver (born 4 March 1955 in London) is a British former racing driver.

In 1978, Weaver started racing in Formula Ford with Scorpion Racing School. He then began his professional career in the European F3. In 1982, he was the Eddie Jordan Racing team's primary driver, but in 1983, he returned to the European F3. He debuted in the British Touring Car Championship in 1989 at the Oulton Park circuit in March that year. He finished second overall in the British Touring Car Championship that year behind the winner John Cleland. He won Class B that year.

In 1987, Weaver joined Dyson Racing, for whom he drove for twenty years. He resulted IMSA GT Championship runner-up in 1995, won the 1998 United States Road Racing Championship and the 2000 and 2001 Rolex Sports Car Series, and collected two vice-championships in the 2004 and 2006 American Le Mans Series.

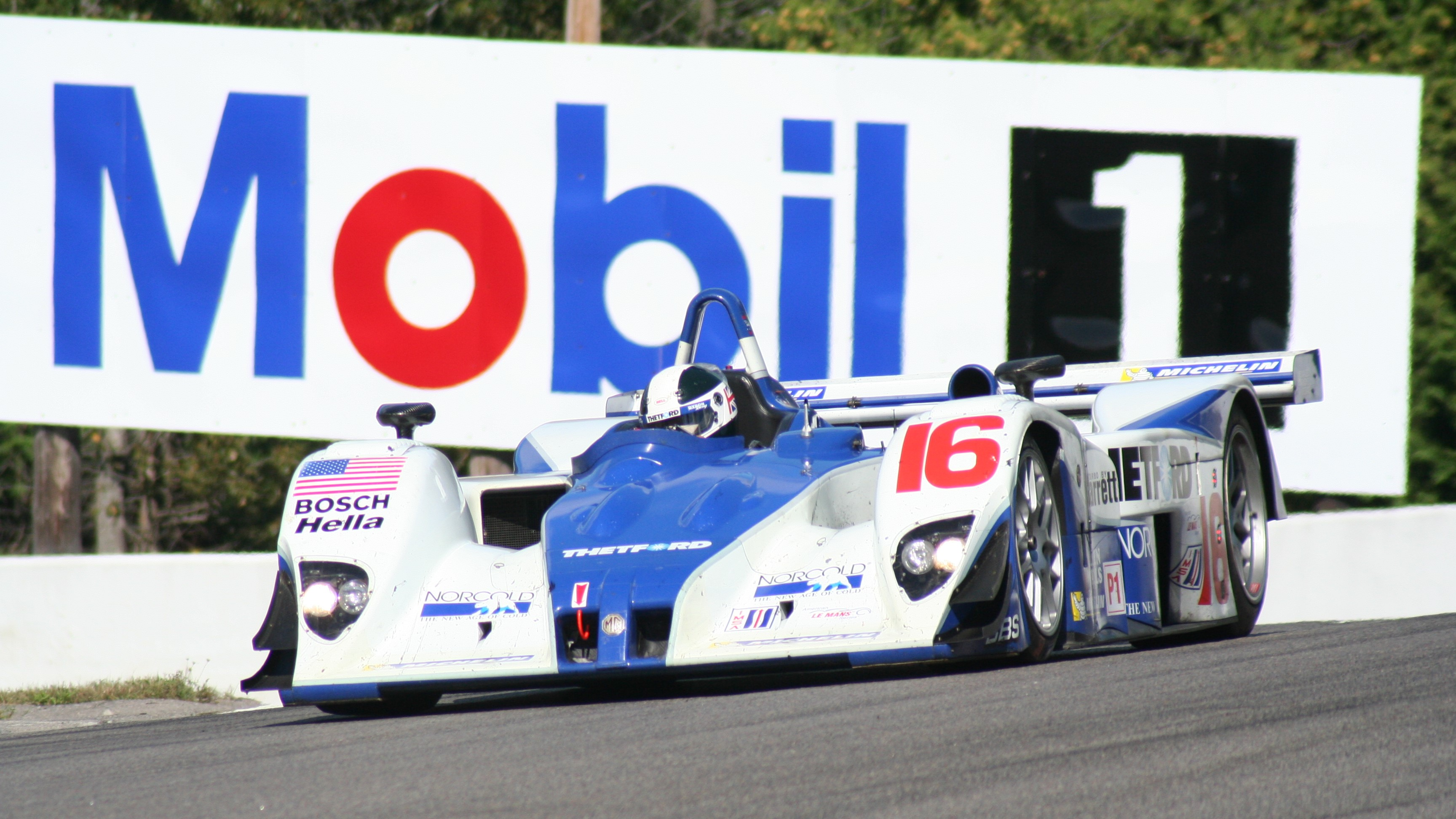
Weaver driving to victory in the 2005 Grand Prix of Mosport in the Dyson Racing MG-Lola EX257

Among his wins, Weaver triumphed at the 1997 24 Hours of Daytona and the 1997, 2000 and 2002 6 Hours of Watkins Glen. He also finished second at the 1985 24 Hours of Le Mans and the 1999 12 Hours of Sebring.

Weaver officially retired after the 2006 American Le Mans Series season.

== Racing record ==
=== Complete British Saloon / Touring Car Championship results ===
(key) (Races in bold indicate pole position – 1984–1990 in class) (Races in italics indicate fastest lap – 1 point awarded ?–1989 in class)

Year	Team	Car	Class	1	2	3	4	5	6	7	8	9	10	11	12	13	14	15	DC	Pts	Class
1984	BMW GB Ltd.	BMW 635CSi	A	DON ovr:8 cls:8	SIL ovr:8 cls:6	**OUL** ovr:1 cls:1	THR; Ret	THR; DNS	SIL ovr:4 cls:4	SNE; Ret	BRH ovr:2 cls:2	BRH ovr:4 cls:4	DON; Ret	SIL ovr:4 cls:4					13th	26	4th
1988	BMW Finance Racing with Mobil 1	BMW M3	B	SIL	OUL; DNS	THR	DON ovr:7‡ cls:1‡	THR	SIL	SIL	BRH	SNE	BRH	BIR; C	DON ovr:12 cls:2	SIL			20th	15	6th
1989	BMW Team Finance	BMW M3	B	**OUL** ovr:6 cls:1	SIL ovr:13 cls:1	**THR** ovr:8 cls:2	**DON** ovr:11 cls:4	**THR** ovr:8 cls:1	**SIL** ovr:13 cls:1	**SIL** ovr:13 cls:1	**BRH** ovr:9 cls:1	SNE ovr:12 cls:1	**BRH** ovr:7 cls:1	**BIR** ovr:11 cls:1	DON ovr:12 cls:1	**SIL** ovr:10 cls:1			**2nd**	**109**	**1st**
1992	Nissan Janspeed Racing	Nissan Primera eGT		SIL	THR	OUL	SNE	BRH	DON; 1	DON; 2	SIL	KNO; 1	KNO; 2	PEM	BRH; 1; 13	BRH; 2; 11	DON; 8	SIL; Ret	22nd	3	

‡ Endurance driver.

=== American Open-Wheel racing results ===
(key)

==== PPG Indycar Series ====
(key) (Races in bold indicate pole position)

Year	Team	1	2	3	4	5	6	7	8	9	10	11	12	13	14	15	Rank	Points	Ref
1989	Dyson Racing	PHX	LBH; 11	INDY	MIL	DET; 22	POR	CLE; 24	MEA	TOR	MCH	POC	MDO	ROA	NAZ	LAG	**30th**	**2**	

=== 24 Hours of Le Mans results ===
Year	Team	Co-drivers	Car	Class	Laps	Pos.	Class pos.
1983	(Japan) Mazdaspeed Co. Ltd.	(United Kingdom) Jeff Allam (United Kingdom) Steve Soper	Mazda 717C	C Jr.	267	18th	**2nd**
1985	(United Kingdom) Richard Lloyd Racing	(United Kingdom) Richard Lloyd (United Kingdom) Jonathan Palmer	Porsche 956 GTi	C1	371	**2nd**	**2nd**
1986	(Japan) Nissan Motorsport	(Japan) Masahiro Hasemi (Japan) Takao Wada	Nissan R85V	C1	285	16th	10th
1987	(United Kingdom) Liqui Moly Equipe	(United States) Price Cobb (United Kingdom) Jonathan Palmer	Porsche 962C GTi	C1	112	DNF	DNF
1989	(United Kingdom) Richard Lloyd Racing	(United Kingdom) Derek Bell (United Kingdom) Tiff Needell	Porsche 962C GTi	C1	339	DNF	DNF
1990	(United Kingdom) Richard Lloyd Racing	(Finland) JJ Lehto (Germany) Manuel Reuter	Porsche 962C GTi	C1	181	DNF	DNF
1991	(Switzerland) Team Salamin Primagaz (Australia) Team Schuppan	(United States) Hurley Haywood (South Africa) Wayne Taylor	Porsche 962C	C2	316	NC	NC
1995	(United Kingdom) PC Automotive Jaguar	(United Kingdom) Tiff Needell (United Kingdom) Richard Piper	Jaguar XJ220	LMGT1	135	DNF	DNF
1996	(United Kingdom) Gulf Racing	(United Kingdom) Ray Bellm (Finland) JJ Lehto	McLaren F1 GTR	LMGT1	323	9th	7th
1997	(United Kingdom) David Price Racing	(United States) Butch Leitzinger (United Kingdom) Andy Wallace	Panoz Esperante GTR-1	LMGT1	236	DNF	DNF
1998	(Germany) Porsche AG	(United States) David Murry (France) Pierre-Henri Raphanel	Porsche LMP1-98	LMP1	218	DNF	DNF
1999	(United Kingdom) Audi Sport UK	(United Kingdom) Perry McCarthy (United Kingdom) Andy Wallace	Audi R8C	LMGTP	198	DNF	DNF

== Sources ==
- http://www.theracesite.com/index.cfm?template=magazine&mag_id=12685

Sporting positions
Preceded by Thomas Bscher; John Nielsen	BPR Global GT Series; Champion; 1996 with: Ray Bellm	Succeeded by Bernd Schneider (FIA GT Championship)
