= 2002 American Le Mans Challenge =

Car racing challenge in Miami, Florida, USA

Bayfront Park circuit (2002)

The 2002 Cadillac American Le Mans Challenge was the ninth round of the 2002 American Le Mans Series season. It took place on a temporary street circuit in Miami, Florida, on October 5, 2002.

== Official results ==
Class winners in bold.

Pos	Class	No	Team	Drivers	Chassis	Tyre	Laps
Pos	Class	No	Team	Drivers	Engine	Tyre	Laps
1	**LMP900**	**1**	**(Germany) Audi Sport North America**	**(Italy) Emanuele Pirro (Germany) Frank Biela**	**Audi R8**	M	**122**
1	**LMP900**	**1**	**(Germany) Audi Sport North America**	**(Italy) Emanuele Pirro (Germany) Frank Biela**	**Audi 3.6L Turbo V8**	M	**122**
2	LMP900	8	(United States) Team Cadillac	(Italy) Max Angelelli (Finland) JJ Lehto	Cadillac Northstar LMP02	M	122
2	LMP900	8	(United States) Team Cadillac	(Italy) Max Angelelli (Finland) JJ Lehto	Cadillac Northstar 4.0L Turbo V8	M	122
3	LMP900	2	(Germany) Audi Sport North America	(Denmark) Tom Kristensen (Italy) Rinaldo Capello	Audi R8	M	122
3	LMP900	2	(Germany) Audi Sport North America	(Denmark) Tom Kristensen (Italy) Rinaldo Capello	Audi 3.6L Turbo V8	M	122
4	LMP900	50	(United States) Panoz Motor Sports	(Australia) David Brabham (Denmark) Jan Magnussen	Panoz LMP01 Evo	M	122
4	LMP900	50	(United States) Panoz Motor Sports	(Australia) David Brabham (Denmark) Jan Magnussen	Élan 6L8 6.0L V8	M	122
5	LMP900	38	(United States) Champion Racing	(United Kingdom) Johnny Herbert (Sweden) Stefan Johansson	Audi R8	M	121
5	LMP900	38	(United States) Champion Racing	(United Kingdom) Johnny Herbert (Sweden) Stefan Johansson	Audi 3.6L Turbo V8	M	121
6	LMP900	36	(United States) Riley & Scott Racing (United States) Jim Matthews Racing	(United States) Tony Ave (Belgium) Marc Goossens	Riley & Scott Mk III C	D	121
6	LMP900	36	(United States) Riley & Scott Racing (United States) Jim Matthews Racing	(United States) Tony Ave (Belgium) Marc Goossens	Élan 6L8 6.0L V8	D	121
7	LMP900	7	(United States) Team Cadillac	(France) Emmanuel Collard (France) Éric Bernard	Cadillac Northstar LMP02	M	120
7	LMP900	7	(United States) Team Cadillac	(France) Emmanuel Collard (France) Éric Bernard	Cadillac Northstar 4.0L Turbo V8	M	120
8	**LMP675**	**11**	**(United States) KnightHawk Racing**	**(Germany) Claudia Hürtgen (United States) Chad Block**	**MG-Lola EX257**	A	**119**
8	**LMP675**	**11**	**(United States) KnightHawk Racing**	**(Germany) Claudia Hürtgen (United States) Chad Block**	**MG (AER) XP20 2.0L Turbo I4**	A	**119**
9	**GTS**	**3**	**(United States) Corvette Racing**	**(Canada) Ron Fellows (United States) Johnny O'Connell**	**Chevrolet Corvette C5-R**	G	**119**
9	**GTS**	**3**	**(United States) Corvette Racing**	**(Canada) Ron Fellows (United States) Johnny O'Connell**	**Chevrolet 7.0L V8**	G	**119**
10	GTS	4	(United States) Corvette Racing	(United States) Andy Pilgrim (United States) Kelly Collins	Chevrolet Corvette C5-R	G	118
10	GTS	4	(United States) Corvette Racing	(United States) Andy Pilgrim (United States) Kelly Collins	Chevrolet 7.0L V8	G	118
11	LMP900	51	(United States) Panoz Motor Sports	(United States) Bryan Herta (United States) Bill Auberlen	Panoz LMP01 Evo	M	118
11	LMP900	51	(United States) Panoz Motor Sports	(United States) Bryan Herta (United States) Bill Auberlen	Élan 6L8 6.0L V8	M	118
12	GTS	33	(United Kingdom) Prodrive	(Czech Republic) Tomáš Enge (Netherlands) Peter Kox	Ferrari 550-GTS Maranello	M	118
12	GTS	33	(United Kingdom) Prodrive	(Czech Republic) Tomáš Enge (Netherlands) Peter Kox	Ferrari 5.9L V12	M	118
13	**GT**	**23**	**(United States) Alex Job Racing**	**(Germany) Sascha Maassen (Germany) Lucas Luhr**	**Porsche 911 GT3-RS**	M	**118**
13	**GT**	**23**	**(United States) Alex Job Racing**	**(Germany) Sascha Maassen (Germany) Lucas Luhr**	**Porsche 3.6L Flat-6**	M	**118**
14	GT	22	(United States) Alex Job Racing	(Germany) Timo Bernhard (Germany) Jörg Bergmeister	Porsche 911 GT3-RS	M	117
14	GT	22	(United States) Alex Job Racing	(Germany) Timo Bernhard (Germany) Jörg Bergmeister	Porsche 3.6L Flat-6	M	117
15	GTS	0	(Italy) Team Olive Garden	(Italy) Mimmo Schiattarella (Italy) Emanuele Naspetti	Ferrari 550 Maranello	M	116
15	GTS	0	(Italy) Team Olive Garden	(Italy) Mimmo Schiattarella (Italy) Emanuele Naspetti	Ferrari 6.0L V12	M	116
16	GT	66	(United States) The Racer's Group	(United States) Kevin Buckler (United States) Brian Cunningham	Porsche 911 GT3-RS	M	115
16	GT	66	(United States) The Racer's Group	(United States) Kevin Buckler (United States) Brian Cunningham	Porsche 3.6L Flat-6	M	115
17	GT	79	(United States) J-3 Racing	(United States) Justin Jackson (United States) Mike Fitzgerald	Porsche 911 GT3-RS	P	112
17	GT	79	(United States) J-3 Racing	(United States) Justin Jackson (United States) Mike Fitzgerald	Porsche 3.6L Flat-6	P	112
18	LMP675	16	(United States) Dyson Racing Team	(United States) Butch Leitzinger (United Kingdom) James Weaver	MG-Lola EX257	G	112
18	LMP675	16	(United States) Dyson Racing Team	(United States) Butch Leitzinger (United Kingdom) James Weaver	MG (AER) XP20 2.0L Turbo I4	G	112
19	LMP675	77	(United States) AB Motorsport	(United States) Jimmy Adams (United States) Joe Blacker (United States) Orlam Sonora	Pilbeam MP84	A	112
19	LMP675	77	(United States) AB Motorsport	(United States) Jimmy Adams (United States) Joe Blacker (United States) Orlam Sonora	Nissan (AER) VQL 3.0L V6	A	112
20	LMP675	13	(United States) Archangel Motorsports	(United Kingdom) Ben Devlin (United States) Bret Arsenault	Lola B2K/40	D	111
20	LMP675	13	(United States) Archangel Motorsports	(United Kingdom) Ben Devlin (United States) Bret Arsenault	Ford (Millington) 2.0L Turbo I4	D	111
21 DNF	GTS	45	(United States) American Viperacing	(United Kingdom) Marino Franchitti (United States) Marc Bunting	Dodge Viper GTS-R	P	109
21 DNF	GTS	45	(United States) American Viperacing	(United Kingdom) Marino Franchitti (United States) Marc Bunting	Dodge 8.0L V10	P	109
22	GTS	25	(Germany) Konrad Motorsport	(United States) Sean Murphy (United States) Charles Slater	Saleen S7-R	P	109
22	GTS	25	(Germany) Konrad Motorsport	(United States) Sean Murphy (United States) Charles Slater	Ford Windsor 7.0L V8	P	109
23	GT	43	(United States) Orbit	(United States) Leo Hindery (United States) Peter Baron	Porsche 911 GT3-RS	M	109
23	GT	43	(United States) Orbit	(United States) Leo Hindery (United States) Peter Baron	Porsche 3.6L Flat-6	M	109
24	GT	42	(United States) Orbit	(United States) Ron Atapattu (United States) Tony Kester	Porsche 911 GT3-RS	M	108
24	GT	42	(United States) Orbit	(United States) Ron Atapattu (United States) Tony Kester	Porsche 3.6L Flat-6	M	108
25	GTS	83	(United Kingdom) Graham Nash Motorsport	(United States) Shane Lewis (United States) Regan Morgan	Saleen S7-R	P	102
25	GTS	83	(United Kingdom) Graham Nash Motorsport	(United States) Shane Lewis (United States) Regan Morgan	Ford Windsor 7.0L V8	P	102
26 DNF	GTS	26	(Germany) Konrad Motorsport	(Austria) Franz Konrad (United States) Terry Borcheller (Switzerland) Toni Seiler	Saleen S7-R	P	100
26 DNF	GTS	26	(Germany) Konrad Motorsport	(Austria) Franz Konrad (United States) Terry Borcheller (Switzerland) Toni Seiler	Ford Windsor 7.0L V8	P	100
27 DNF	LMP675	37	(United States) Intersport	(United States) Jon Field (United States) Mike Durand	MG-Lola EX257	G	94
27 DNF	LMP675	37	(United States) Intersport	(United States) Jon Field (United States) Mike Durand	MG (AER) XP20 2.0L Turbo I4	G	94
28 DNF	LMP675	56	(United States) Team Bucknum Racing	(United States) Jeff Bucknum (United States) Chris McMurry (United States) Bryan Willman	Pilbeam MP84	A	85
28 DNF	LMP675	56	(United States) Team Bucknum Racing	(United States) Jeff Bucknum (United States) Chris McMurry (United States) Bryan Willman	Nissan (AER) VQL 3.0L V6	A	85
29 DNF	LMP900	30	(United States) Intersport	(United States) Clint Field (United States) Mike Neuhaus	Lola B2K/10B	G	61
29 DNF	LMP900	30	(United States) Intersport	(United States) Clint Field (United States) Mike Neuhaus	Judd GV4 4.0L V10	G	61
30 DNF	LMP900	27	(United Kingdom) Chamberlain	(United Kingdom) Christian Vann (Venezuela) Milka Duno	Dome S101	G	47
30 DNF	LMP900	27	(United Kingdom) Chamberlain	(United Kingdom) Christian Vann (Venezuela) Milka Duno	Judd GV4 4.0L V10	G	47
31 DNF	GT	21	(France) Perspective USA Corporation	(France) Thierry Perrier (Belgium) Michel Neugarten (Philippines) Angelo Barretto	Porsche 911 GT3-R	D	38
31 DNF	GT	21	(France) Perspective USA Corporation	(France) Thierry Perrier (Belgium) Michel Neugarten (Philippines) Angelo Barretto	Porsche 3.6L Flat-6	D	38
32 DNF	GT	67	(United States) The Racer's Group	(United States) Michael Schrom (United States) Vic Rice	Porsche 911 GT3-RS	M	24
32 DNF	GT	67	(United States) The Racer's Group	(United States) Michael Schrom (United States) Vic Rice	Porsche 3.6L Turbo Flat-6	M	24
33 DNF	GT	40	(United States) Alegra Motorsports	(United States) Scooter Gabel (United States) Carlos DeQuesada	BMW M3	Y	5
33 DNF	GT	40	(United States) Alegra Motorsports	(United States) Scooter Gabel (United States) Carlos DeQuesada	BMW 3.2L I6	Y	5
34 DNF	GT	10	(United States) Alegra Motorsports	(United States) Chris Gleason (United States) Emil Assentato	BMW M3	Y	3
34 DNF	GT	10	(United States) Alegra Motorsports	(United States) Chris Gleason (United States) Emil Assentato	BMW 3.2L I6	Y	3
35 DNF	GTS	44	(United States) American Viperacing	(United States) Jeff Altenburg (United States) Tom Weickardt	Dodge Viper GTS-R	P	2
35 DNF	GTS	44	(United States) American Viperacing	(United States) Jeff Altenburg (United States) Tom Weickardt	Dodge 8.0L V10	P	2
DNS	GTS	84	(United Kingdom) Graham Nash Motorsport	(Portugal) Pedro Chaves (Brazil) Thomas Erdos	Saleen S7-R	P	-
DNS	GTS	84	(United Kingdom) Graham Nash Motorsport	(Portugal) Pedro Chaves (Brazil) Thomas Erdos	Ford Windsor 7.0L V8	P	-

== Statistics ==
- Pole Position - #1 Audi Sport North America - 1:03.873
- Fastest Lap - #2 Audi Sport North America - 1:05.620
- Distance - 272.323 km
- Average Speed - 98.392 km/h

American Le Mans Series
Previous race: 2002 Monterey Sports Car Championships	2002 season	Next race: 2002 Petit Le Mans
