= 2002 Petit Le Mans =

Sportscar endurance race in Georgia, US

The Track map of Road Atlanta

The 2002 Audi presents Petit Le Mans was the tenth and final round of the 2002 American Le Mans Series season. It took place at Road Atlanta, Georgia, on October 12, 2002.

== Official results ==
Class winners in bold.

Pos	Class	No	Team	Drivers	Chassis	Tyre	Laps
Pos	Class	No	Team	Drivers	Engine	Tyre	Laps
1	**LMP900**	**2**	**(Germany) Audi Sport North America**	**(Denmark) Tom Kristensen (Italy) Rinaldo Capello**	**Audi R8**	M	**394**
1	**LMP900**	**2**	**(Germany) Audi Sport North America**	**(Denmark) Tom Kristensen (Italy) Rinaldo Capello**	**Audi 3.6 L Turbo V8**	M	**394**
2	LMP900	38	(United States) Champion Racing	(United Kingdom) Johnny Herbert (Sweden) Stefan Johansson	Audi R8	M	394
2	LMP900	38	(United States) Champion Racing	(United Kingdom) Johnny Herbert (Sweden) Stefan Johansson	Audi 3.6 L Turbo V8	M	394
3	LMP900	8	(United States) Team Cadillac	(Italy) Max Angelelli (Finland) JJ Lehto	Cadillac Northstar LMP02	M	390
3	LMP900	8	(United States) Team Cadillac	(Italy) Max Angelelli (Finland) JJ Lehto	Cadillac Northstar 4.0 L Turbo V8	M	390
4	LMP900	7	(United States) Team Cadillac	(France) Emmanuel Collard (France) Éric Bernard	Cadillac Northstar LMP02	M	389
4	LMP900	7	(United States) Team Cadillac	(France) Emmanuel Collard (France) Éric Bernard	Cadillac Northstar 4.0 L Turbo V8	M	389
5	LMP900	51	(United States) Panoz Motor Sports	(United States) Bryan Herta (United States) Bill Auberlen (United States) Gunnar Jeannette	Panoz LMP01 Evo	M	380
5	LMP900	51	(United States) Panoz Motor Sports	(United States) Bryan Herta (United States) Bill Auberlen (United States) Gunnar Jeannette	Élan 6L8 6.0 L V8	M	380
6	LMP900	1	(Germany) Audi Sport North America	(Italy) Emanuele Pirro (Germany) Frank Biela	Audi R8	M	376
6	LMP900	1	(Germany) Audi Sport North America	(Italy) Emanuele Pirro (Germany) Frank Biela	Audi 3.6 L Turbo V8	M	376
7	LMP900	50	(United States) Panoz Motor Sports	(Australia) David Brabham (Denmark) Jan Magnussen (United States) David Donohue	Panoz LMP01 Evo	M	372
7	LMP900	50	(United States) Panoz Motor Sports	(Australia) David Brabham (Denmark) Jan Magnussen (United States) David Donohue	Élan 6L8 6.0 L V8	M	372
8	**LMP675**	**37**	**(United States) Intersport**	**(United States) Jon Field (United States) Mike Durand (United States) Duncan Dayton**	**MG-Lola EX257**	G	**366**
8	**LMP675**	**37**	**(United States) Intersport**	**(United States) Jon Field (United States) Mike Durand (United States) Duncan Dayton**	**MG (AER) XP20 2.0 L Turbo I4**	G	**366**
9	**GTS**	**3**	**(United States) Corvette Racing**	**(Canada) Ron Fellows (United States) Johnny O'Connell (United Kingdom) Oliver Gavin**	**Chevrolet Corvette C5-R**	G	**362**
9	**GTS**	**3**	**(United States) Corvette Racing**	**(Canada) Ron Fellows (United States) Johnny O'Connell (United Kingdom) Oliver Gavin**	**Chevrolet 7.0 L V8**	G	**362**
10	GTS	33	(United Kingdom) Prodrive	(Czech Republic) Tomáš Enge (Netherlands) Peter Kox (Switzerland) Alain Menu	Ferrari 550-GTS Maranello	M	361
10	GTS	33	(United Kingdom) Prodrive	(Czech Republic) Tomáš Enge (Netherlands) Peter Kox (Switzerland) Alain Menu	Ferrari 5.9 L V12	M	361
11	GTS	4	(United States) Corvette Racing	(United States) Andy Pilgrim (United States) Kelly Collins (France) Franck Fréon	Chevrolet Corvette C5-R	G	357
11	GTS	4	(United States) Corvette Racing	(United States) Andy Pilgrim (United States) Kelly Collins (France) Franck Fréon	Chevrolet 7.0 L V8	G	357
12	LMP675	13	(United States) Archangel Motorsport Services	(United Kingdom) Ben Devlin (United States) Jason Workman (France) Georges Forgeois	Lola B2K/40	D	351
12	LMP675	13	(United States) Archangel Motorsport Services	(United Kingdom) Ben Devlin (United States) Jason Workman (France) Georges Forgeois	Ford (Millington) 2.0 L Turbo I4	D	351
13	GTS	0	(Italy) Team Olive Garden	(Italy) Mimmo Schiattarella (Italy) Emanuele Naspetti (Italy) Max Papis	Ferrari 550 Maranello	M	351
13	GTS	0	(Italy) Team Olive Garden	(Italy) Mimmo Schiattarella (Italy) Emanuele Naspetti (Italy) Max Papis	Ferrari 6.0 L V12	M	351
14	**GT**	**23**	**(United States) Alex Job Racing**	**(Germany) Sascha Maassen (Germany) Lucas Luhr**	**Porsche 911 GT3-RS**	M	**348**
14	**GT**	**23**	**(United States) Alex Job Racing**	**(Germany) Sascha Maassen (Germany) Lucas Luhr**	**Porsche 3.6 L Flat-6**	M	**348**
15	GT	31	(United States) Petersen Motorsports	(United States) Randy Pobst (United Kingdom) Johnny Mowlem	Porsche 911 GT3-RS	Y	346
15	GT	31	(United States) Petersen Motorsports	(United States) Randy Pobst (United Kingdom) Johnny Mowlem	Porsche 3.6 L Flat-6	Y	346
16	GT	35	(United States) Risi Competizione	(United States) Anthony Lazzaro (Germany) Ralf Kelleners	Ferrari 360 Modena GT	P	344
16	GT	35	(United States) Risi Competizione	(United States) Anthony Lazzaro (Germany) Ralf Kelleners	Ferrari 3.6 L V8	P	344
17	GT	43	(United States) Orbit	(United States) Leo Hindery (United States) Peter Baron (United States) Tony Kester	Porsche 911 GT3-RS	M	341
17	GT	43	(United States) Orbit	(United States) Leo Hindery (United States) Peter Baron (United States) Tony Kester	Porsche 3.6 L Flat-6	M	341
18	GTS	25	(Germany) Konrad Motorsport	(United States) Sean Murphy (United States) Charles Slater (France) Jean-François Yvon	Saleen S7-R	P	332
18	GTS	25	(Germany) Konrad Motorsport	(United States) Sean Murphy (United States) Charles Slater (France) Jean-François Yvon	Ford 7.0 L V8	P	332
19	GT	66	(United States) The Racer's Group	(United States) Kevin Buckler (United States) Brian Cunningham (United States) Michael Schrom	Porsche 911 GT3-RS	M	331
19	GT	66	(United States) The Racer's Group	(United States) Kevin Buckler (United States) Brian Cunningham (United States) Michael Schrom	Porsche 3.6 L Flat-6	M	331
20	LMP900	87	(United States) Sezio Florida Racing Team	(United States) Jeret Schroeder (United States) John Mirro (France) Patrice Roussel	Norma M2000	G	330
20	LMP900	87	(United States) Sezio Florida Racing Team	(United States) Jeret Schroeder (United States) John Mirro (France) Patrice Roussel	Ford (Kinetic) 6.0 L V8	G	330
21	GT	60	(United Kingdom) P.K. Sport	(United States) Joe Foster (Austria) Philipp Peter (Italy) Giovanni Anapoli	Porsche 911 GT3-R	P	330
21	GT	60	(United Kingdom) P.K. Sport	(United States) Joe Foster (Austria) Philipp Peter (Italy) Giovanni Anapoli	Porsche 3.6 L Flat-6	P	330
22	GT	52	(Germany) Seikel Motorsport	(United States) Philip Collin (United States) Grady Willingham (Canada) Tony Burgess	Porsche 911 GT3-RS	Y	327
22	GT	52	(Germany) Seikel Motorsport	(United States) Philip Collin (United States) Grady Willingham (Canada) Tony Burgess	Porsche 3.6 L Flat-6	Y	327
23	GT	40	(United States) Alegra Motorsports	(United States) Scooter Gabel (United States) Carlos DeQuesada (United States) Boris Said	BMW M3	Y	327
23	GT	40	(United States) Alegra Motorsports	(United States) Scooter Gabel (United States) Carlos DeQuesada (United States) Boris Said	BMW 3.2 L I6	Y	327
24	GT	98	(United States) Cirtek Motorsport	(France) Stéphane Ortelli (France) Christophe Bouchut	Porsche 911 GT3-R	D	325
24	GT	98	(United States) Cirtek Motorsport	(France) Stéphane Ortelli (France) Christophe Bouchut	Porsche 3.6 L Flat-6	D	325
25	GTS	26	(Germany) Konrad Motorsport	(Austria) Franz Konrad (United States) Terry Borcheller (Switzerland) Toni Seiler	Saleen S7-R	P	320
25	GTS	26	(Germany) Konrad Motorsport	(Austria) Franz Konrad (United States) Terry Borcheller (Switzerland) Toni Seiler	Ford 7.0 L V8	P	320
26	GT	42	(United States) Orbit	(United States) Joe Policastro Sr. (United States) Joe Policastro Jr. (United States) Gary Schultheis	Porsche 911 GT3-RS	M	317
26	GT	42	(United States) Orbit	(United States) Joe Policastro Sr. (United States) Joe Policastro Jr. (United States) Gary Schultheis	Porsche 3.6 L Flat-6	M	317
27	GT	21	(France) Perspective USA Corporation	(France) Thierry Perrier (France) Boris Derichebourg (Philippines) Angelo Barretto	Porsche 911 GT3-R	D	315
27	GT	21	(France) Perspective USA Corporation	(France) Thierry Perrier (France) Boris Derichebourg (Philippines) Angelo Barretto	Porsche 3.6 L Flat-6	D	315
28 DNF	GTS	45	(United States) American Viperacing	(United Kingdom) Marino Franchitti (Netherlands) Mike Hezemans (Italy) Fabio Babini	Dodge Viper GTS-R	P	296
28 DNF	GTS	45	(United States) American Viperacing	(United Kingdom) Marino Franchitti (Netherlands) Mike Hezemans (Italy) Fabio Babini	Dodge 8.0 L V10	P	296
29	LMP675	55	(United States) Team Bucknum Racing	(United States) John Olsen (Canada) Melanie Paterson (Germany) Pierre Ehret	Pilbeam MP84	A	273
29	LMP675	55	(United States) Team Bucknum Racing	(United States) John Olsen (Canada) Melanie Paterson (Germany) Pierre Ehret	Nissan (AER) VQL 3.0 L V6	A	273
30	LMP675	11	(United States) KnightHawk Racing	(United States) Andy Lally (United States) Chad Block	MG-Lola EX257	A	254
30	LMP675	11	(United States) KnightHawk Racing	(United States) Andy Lally (United States) Chad Block	MG (AER) XP20 2.0 L Turbo I4	A	254
31 DNF	LMP675	56	(United States) Team Bucknum Racing	(United States) Jeff Bucknum (United States) Chris McMurry (United States) Bryan Willman	Pilbeam MP84	A	248
31 DNF	LMP675	56	(United States) Team Bucknum Racing	(United States) Jeff Bucknum (United States) Chris McMurry (United States) Bryan Willman	Nissan (AER) VQL 3.4 L V6	A	248
32 DNF	LMP900	36	(United States) Riley & Scott Racing (United States) Jim Matthews Racing	(United States) Tony Ave (Belgium) Marc Goossens	Riley & Scott Mk III C	D	246
32 DNF	LMP900	36	(United States) Riley & Scott Racing (United States) Jim Matthews Racing	(United States) Tony Ave (Belgium) Marc Goossens	Élan 6L8 6.0 L V8	D	246
33	GT	29	(United Kingdom) Sebah Automotive	(Germany) Jürgen von Gartzen (United Kingdom) Richard Dean (United Kingdom) Bart Hayden	Porsche 911 GT3-R	P	244
33	GT	29	(United Kingdom) Sebah Automotive	(Germany) Jürgen von Gartzen (United Kingdom) Richard Dean (United Kingdom) Bart Hayden	Porsche 3.6 L Flat-6	P	244
34 DNF	GTS	83	(United Kingdom) Graham Nash Motorsport	(United States) Vic Rice (United Kingdom) Shaun Balfe (United Kingdom) Mike Newton	Saleen S7-R	P	221
34 DNF	GTS	83	(United Kingdom) Graham Nash Motorsport	(United States) Vic Rice (United Kingdom) Shaun Balfe (United Kingdom) Mike Newton	Ford 7.0 L V8	P	221
35	LMP900	27	(United Kingdom) Chamberlain	(United Kingdom) Christian Vann (Venezuela) Milka Duno (France) Xavier Pompidou	Dome S101	G	213
35	LMP900	27	(United Kingdom) Chamberlain	(United Kingdom) Christian Vann (Venezuela) Milka Duno (France) Xavier Pompidou	Judd GV4 4.0 L V10	G	213
36 DNF	LMP675	74	(United Kingdom) Archangel Motorsports	(United States) John Mefford (United States) Andrew Davis (South Africa) Earl Goddard	Reynard 01Q	D	190
36 DNF	LMP675	74	(United Kingdom) Archangel Motorsports	(United States) John Mefford (United States) Andrew Davis (South Africa) Earl Goddard	Ford (Nicholson-McLaren) 3.3 L V8	D	190
37 DNF	GT	34	(France) XL Racing	(United States) Craig Stanton (United States) Hugh Plumb (France) Gilles Vannelet	Ferrari 550 Maranello	Y	171
37 DNF	GT	34	(France) XL Racing	(United States) Craig Stanton (United States) Hugh Plumb (France) Gilles Vannelet	Ferrari 5.5 L V12	Y	171
38 DNF	GT	22	(United States) Alex Job Racing	(Germany) Timo Bernhard (Germany) Jörg Bergmeister (Germany) Marc Lieb	Porsche 911 GT3-RS	M	159
38 DNF	GT	22	(United States) Alex Job Racing	(Germany) Timo Bernhard (Germany) Jörg Bergmeister (Germany) Marc Lieb	Porsche 3.6 L Flat-6	M	159
39 DNF	LMP675	16	(United States) Dyson Racing Team	(United States) Butch Leitzinger (United Kingdom) James Weaver (United Kingdom) Andy Wallace	MG-Lola EX257	G	152
39 DNF	LMP675	16	(United States) Dyson Racing Team	(United States) Butch Leitzinger (United Kingdom) James Weaver (United Kingdom) Andy Wallace	MG (AER) XP20 2.0 L Turbo I4	G	152
40 DNF	LMP675	24	(Japan) AutoExe Motorsports	(United States) Jim Downing (Japan) Yojiro Terada (France) Stéphane Daoudi	AutoExe (WR) LMP-02	D	142
40 DNF	LMP675	24	(Japan) AutoExe Motorsports	(United States) Jim Downing (Japan) Yojiro Terada (France) Stéphane Daoudi	Mazda R26B 2.6 L 4-Rotor	D	142
41 DNF	LMP675	15	(United Kingdom) R.N. Motorsport	(Denmark) John Nielsen (Denmark) Casper Elgaard	Reynard 02S	D	133
41 DNF	LMP675	15	(United Kingdom) R.N. Motorsport	(Denmark) John Nielsen (Denmark) Casper Elgaard	Zytek ZG348 3.4 L V8	D	133
42 DNF	GT	10	(United States) Alegra Motorsports	(United States) Chris Gleason (United States) Emil Assentato (United States) Nick Longhi	BMW M3	Y	118
42 DNF	GT	10	(United States) Alegra Motorsports	(United States) Chris Gleason (United States) Emil Assentato (United States) Nick Longhi	BMW 3.2 L I6	Y	118
43 DNF	LMP900	30	(United States) Intersport	(United States) Clint Field (United States) Mike Neuhaus (United States) John Miller	Lola B2K/10B	G	116
43 DNF	LMP900	30	(United States) Intersport	(United States) Clint Field (United States) Mike Neuhaus (United States) John Miller	Judd GV4 4.0 L V10	G	116
44 DNF	GT	79	(United States) J-3 Racing	(United States) Justin Jackson (United States) Mike Fitzgerald (United States) Chris McMurry	Porsche 911 GT3-RS	P	37
44 DNF	GT	79	(United States) J-3 Racing	(United States) Justin Jackson (United States) Mike Fitzgerald (United States) Chris McMurry	Porsche 3.6 L Flat-6	P	37
45 DNF	LMP675	62	(United States) Team Spencer Motorsports	(United States) Rich Grupp (United States) Ryan Hampton (United States) Dennis Spencer	Lola B2K/42	A	29
45 DNF	LMP675	62	(United States) Team Spencer Motorsports	(United States) Rich Grupp (United States) Ryan Hampton (United States) Dennis Spencer	Mazda 1.3 L 2-Rotor	A	29
46 DNF	GTS	44	(United States) American Viperacing	(United States) Marc Buntin (United States) Tom Weickardt (France) Jean-Philippe Belloc	Dodge Viper GTS-R	P	20
46 DNF	GTS	44	(United States) American Viperacing	(United States) Marc Buntin (United States) Tom Weickardt (France) Jean-Philippe Belloc	Dodge 8.0 L V10	P	20
47 DNF	GT	61	(United Kingdom) P.K. Sport	(United Kingdom) Piers Masarati (United Kingdom) Robin Liddell (United Kingdom) Gavin Pickering	Porsche 911 GT3-RS	P	10
47 DNF	GT	61	(United Kingdom) P.K. Sport	(United Kingdom) Piers Masarati (United Kingdom) Robin Liddell (United Kingdom) Gavin Pickering	Porsche 3.6 L Flat-6	P	10
DNS	GTS	84	(United Kingdom) Graham Nash Motorsport	(Brazil) Thomas Erdos (United Kingdom) Robin Liddell (United Kingdom) Rob Barff	Saleen S7-R	P	-
DNS	GTS	84	(United Kingdom) Graham Nash Motorsport	(Brazil) Thomas Erdos (United Kingdom) Robin Liddell (United Kingdom) Rob Barff	Ford 7.0 L V8	P	-

== Statistics ==
- Pole Position - #1 Audi Sport North America - 1:12.343
- Fastest Lap - #1 Audi Sport North America - 1:11.877
- Distance - 1610.567 km
- Average Speed - 170.232 km/h

American Le Mans Series
Previous race: 2002 American Le Mans Challenge	2002 season	Next race: None
