= 2002 Grand Prix of Mosport =

Mosport International Raceway

The 2002 mail2web.com Grand Prix of Mosport was a sports car racing event held at Mosport International Raceway near Bowmanville, Ontario, Canada from August 16 to the 18, 2002. The race was the seventh round of the 2002 American Le Mans Series season, and was the 17th IMSA sanctioned sports car race held at the facility.

== Race ==
The overall race was won by Audi Sport North America's Audi R8 driven by Tom Kristensen and Rinaldo Capello for their third win of the season. Johnny Herbert and Stefan Johansson brought the Champion Racing Audi R8 home for second, while Max Angelelli and JJ Lehto produced Team Cadillac's first podium since 2001 in the Cadillac Northstar LMP02.

The LMP 675 class was won by Team Bucknum Racing's Pilbeam MP84 driven by Jeff Bucknum, Chris McMurry and Bryan Willman. Ontario native and Mosport veteran Ron Fellows along with Corvette Racing teammate Johnny O'Connell drove the Chevrolet Corvette C5-R to victory in the GTS class. The Racer's Group Porsche 911 GT3-RS driven by Kevin Buckler and Brian Cunningham took the GT class win.

The race attracted a crowd of 30,000 and was broadcast on NBC Sports with Rick Benjamin and Bill Adam calling the race.

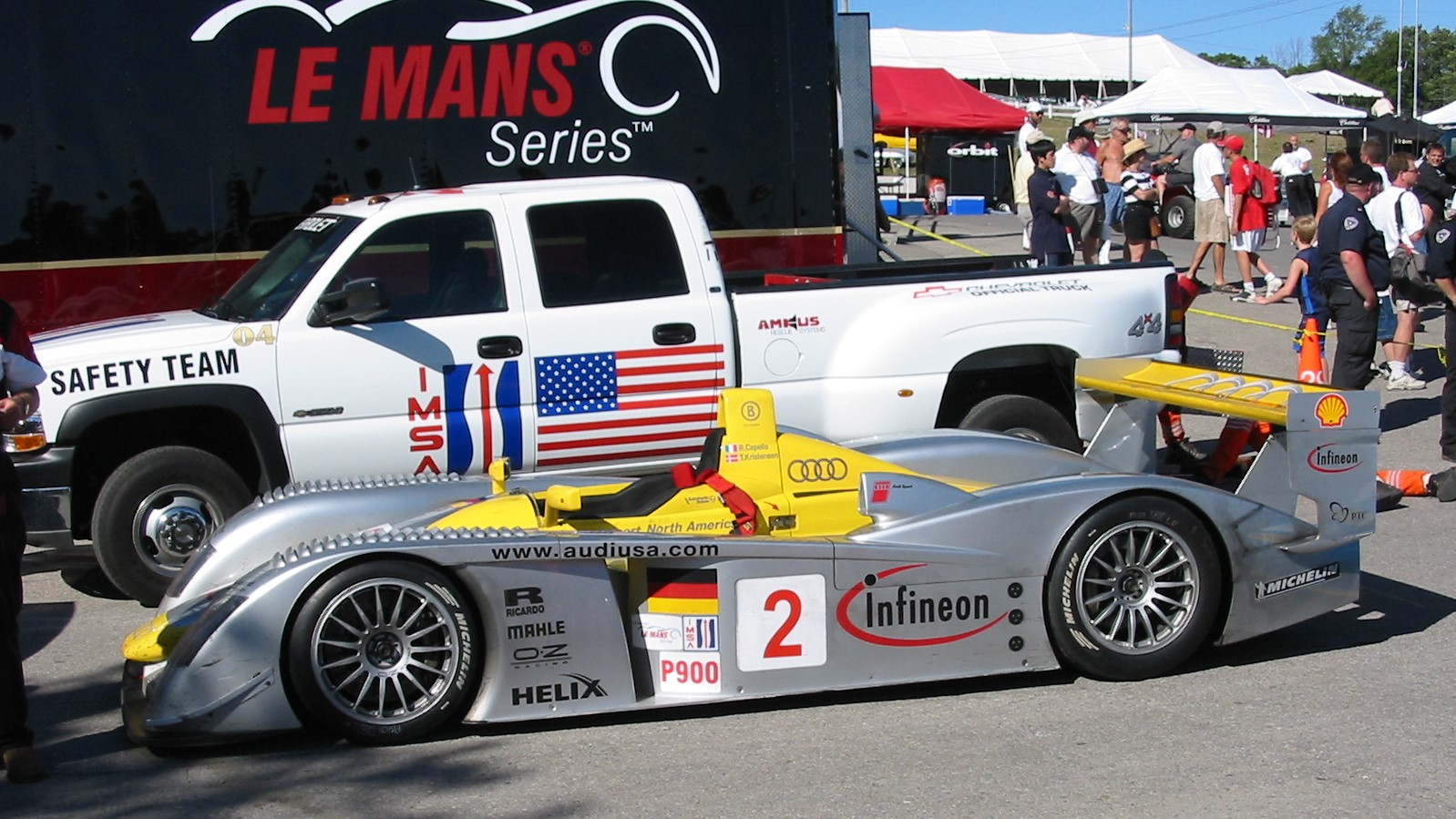
Audi Sport North America Audi R8 - Winner 2002 Grand Prix of Mosport

== Official results ==
Class winners in bold.

Pos	Class	No	Team	Drivers	Chassis	Tyre	Laps
Pos	Class	No	Team	Drivers	Engine	Tyre	Laps
1	**LMP900**	**2**	**(Germany) Audi Sport North America**	**(Denmark) Tom Kristensen (Italy) Rinaldo Capello**	**Audi R8**	M	**121**
1	**LMP900**	**2**	**(Germany) Audi Sport North America**	**(Denmark) Tom Kristensen (Italy) Rinaldo Capello**	**Audi 3.6L Turbo V8**	M	**121**
2	LMP900	38	(United States) Champion Racing	(United Kingdom) Johnny Herbert (Sweden) Stefan Johansson	Audi R8	M	120
2	LMP900	38	(United States) Champion Racing	(United Kingdom) Johnny Herbert (Sweden) Stefan Johansson	Audi 3.6L Turbo V8	M	120
3	LMP900	8	(United States) Team Cadillac	(Italy) Max Angelelli (Finland) JJ Lehto	Cadillac Northstar LMP02	M	119
3	LMP900	8	(United States) Team Cadillac	(Italy) Max Angelelli (Finland) JJ Lehto	Cadillac Northstar 4.0L Turbo V8	M	119
4	LMP900	50	(United States) Panoz Motor Sports	(Australia) David Brabham (Denmark) Jan Magnussen	Panoz LMP01 Evo	M	118
4	LMP900	50	(United States) Panoz Motor Sports	(Australia) David Brabham (Denmark) Jan Magnussen	Élan 6L8 6.0L V8	M	118
5	LMP900	51	(United States) Panoz Motor Sports	(United States) Bryan Herta (United States) Bill Auberlen	Panoz LMP01 Evo	M	118
5	LMP900	51	(United States) Panoz Motor Sports	(United States) Bryan Herta (United States) Bill Auberlen	Élan 6L8 6.0L V8	M	118
6	LMP900	7	(United States) Team Cadillac	(France) Emmanuel Collard (France) Éric Bernard	Cadillac Northstar LMP02	M	118
6	LMP900	7	(United States) Team Cadillac	(France) Emmanuel Collard (France) Éric Bernard	Cadillac Northstar 4.0L Turbo V8	M	118
7	**GTS**	**3**	**(United States) Corvette Racing**	**(Canada) Ron Fellows (United States) Johnny O'Connell**	**Chevrolet Corvette C5-R**	G	**113**
7	**GTS**	**3**	**(United States) Corvette Racing**	**(Canada) Ron Fellows (United States) Johnny O'Connell**	**Chevrolet 7.0L V8**	G	**113**
8	GTS	4	(United States) Corvette Racing	(United States) Andy Pilgrim (United States) Kelly Collins	Chevrolet Corvette C5-R	G	112
8	GTS	4	(United States) Corvette Racing	(United States) Andy Pilgrim (United States) Kelly Collins	Chevrolet 7.0L V8	G	112
9	GTS	26	(Germany) Konrad Motorsport	(Austria) Franz Konrad (United States) Terry Borcheller	Saleen S7-R	P	110
9	GTS	26	(Germany) Konrad Motorsport	(Austria) Franz Konrad (United States) Terry Borcheller	Ford 7.0L V8	P	110
10	LMP900	30	(United States) Intersport	(United States) Clint Field (United States) Mike Neuhaus	Lola B2K/10B	G	108
10	LMP900	30	(United States) Intersport	(United States) Clint Field (United States) Mike Neuhaus	Judd GV4 4.0L V10	G	108
11	**LMP675**	**56**	**(United States) Team Bucknum Racing**	**(United States) Jeff Bucknum (United States) Chris McMurry (United States) Bryan Willman**	**Pilbeam MP84**	A	**107**
11	**LMP675**	**56**	**(United States) Team Bucknum Racing**	**(United States) Jeff Bucknum (United States) Chris McMurry (United States) Bryan Willman**	**Nissan (AER) VQL 3.4L V6**	A	**107**
12	GTS	45	(United States) American Viperacing	(United Kingdom) Marino Franchitti (United States) Marc Bunting	Dodge Viper GTS-R	P	107
12	GTS	45	(United States) American Viperacing	(United Kingdom) Marino Franchitti (United States) Marc Bunting	Dodge 8.0L V10	P	107
13	**GT**	**66**	**(United States) The Racer's Group**	**(United States) Kevin Buckler (United States) Brian Cunningham**	**Porsche 911 GT3-RS**	M	**106**
13	**GT**	**66**	**(United States) The Racer's Group**	**(United States) Kevin Buckler (United States) Brian Cunningham**	**Porsche 3.6L Flat-6**	M	**106**
14	GTS	44	(United States) American Viperacing	(United States) Kevin Allen (United States) Tom Weickardt	Dodge Viper GTS-R	P	104
14	GTS	44	(United States) American Viperacing	(United States) Kevin Allen (United States) Tom Weickardt	Dodge 8.0L V10	P	104
15	GT	43	(United States) Orbit	(United States) Leo Hindery (United States) Peter Baron	Porsche 911 GT3-RS	M	103
15	GT	43	(United States) Orbit	(United States) Leo Hindery (United States) Peter Baron	Porsche 3.6L Flat-6	M	103
16	LMP675	19	(United States) Essex Racing	(Canada) Melanie Paterson (Canada) Ross Bentley	Lola B2K/40	D	103
16	LMP675	19	(United States) Essex Racing	(Canada) Melanie Paterson (Canada) Ross Bentley	Nissan (AER) VQL 3.0L V6	D	103
17	GT	23	(United States) Alex Job Racing	(Germany) Sascha Maassen (Germany) Lucas Luhr	Porsche 911 GT3-RS	M	103
17	GT	23	(United States) Alex Job Racing	(Germany) Sascha Maassen (Germany) Lucas Luhr	Porsche 3.6L Flat-6	M	103
18	GTS	0	(Italy) Team Olive Garden	(Italy) Mimmo Schiattarella (Italy) Emanuele Naspetti	Ferrari 550 Maranello	M	99
18	GTS	0	(Italy) Team Olive Garden	(Italy) Mimmo Schiattarella (Italy) Emanuele Naspetti	Ferrari 6.0L V12	M	99
19 DNF	GT	52	(Germany) Seikel Motorsport	(United States) Hugh Plumb (Canada) Jeffrey Pabst (Canada) Tony Burgess	Porsche 911 GT3-RS	Y	93
19 DNF	GT	52	(Germany) Seikel Motorsport	(United States) Hugh Plumb (Canada) Jeffrey Pabst (Canada) Tony Burgess	Porsche 3.6L Flat-6	Y	93
20 DNF	LMP675	13	(United States) Archangel Motorsports	(Canada) Marc-Antoine Camirand (United Kingdom) Ben Devlin (United States) David Sterenberg	Lola B2K/40	D	91
20 DNF	LMP675	13	(United States) Archangel Motorsports	(Canada) Marc-Antoine Camirand (United Kingdom) Ben Devlin (United States) David Sterenberg	Ford (Millington) 2.0L Turbo I4	D	91
21 DNF	GT	67	(United States) The Racer's Group	(United States) Michael Schrom (United States) Darren Law	Porsche 911 GT3-RS	M	91
21 DNF	GT	67	(United States) The Racer's Group	(United States) Michael Schrom (United States) Darren Law	Porsche 3.6L Turbo Flat-6	M	91
22 DNF	LMP900	1	(Germany) Audi Sport North America	(Italy) Emanuele Pirro (Germany) Frank Biela	Audi R8	M	88
22 DNF	LMP900	1	(Germany) Audi Sport North America	(Italy) Emanuele Pirro (Germany) Frank Biela	Audi 3.6L Turbo V8	M	88
23	GT	22	(United States) Alex Job Racing	(Germany) Timo Bernhard (Germany) Jörg Bergmeister	Porsche 911 GT3-RS	M	85
23	GT	22	(United States) Alex Job Racing	(Germany) Timo Bernhard (Germany) Jörg Bergmeister	Porsche 3.6L Flat-6	M	85
24 DNF	GT	89	(Canada) Porschehaus Racing	(Canada) Robert Julien (United States) Adam Merzon	Porsche 911 GT3-RS	D	25
24 DNF	GT	89	(Canada) Porschehaus Racing	(Canada) Robert Julien (United States) Adam Merzon	Porsche 3.6L Flat-6	D	25
25 DNF	LMP675	11	(United States) KnightHawk Racing	(Germany) Claudia Hürtgen (United States) Steven Knight	MG-Lola EX257	A	59
25 DNF	LMP675	11	(United States) KnightHawk Racing	(Germany) Claudia Hürtgen (United States) Steven Knight	MG (AER) XP20 2.0L Turbo I4	A	59
26 DNF	LMP675	16	(United States) Dyson Racing Team	(United States) Butch Leitzinger (United Kingdom) James Weaver	MG-Lola EX257	G	28
26 DNF	LMP675	16	(United States) Dyson Racing Team	(United States) Butch Leitzinger (United Kingdom) James Weaver	MG (AER) XP20 2.0L Turbo I4	G	28
27 DNF	LMP675	37	(United States) Intersport	(United States) Jon Field (United States) Mike Durand	MG-Lola EX257	G	12
27 DNF	LMP675	37	(United States) Intersport	(United States) Jon Field (United States) Mike Durand	MG (AER) XP20 2.0L Turbo I4	G	12

== Statistics ==
- Pole Position - #1 Audi Sport North America - 1:07.169
- Fastest Lap - #2 Audi Sport North America - 1:09.568
- Distance - 478.843 km
- Average Speed - 173.898 km/h

== Photo Gallery ==
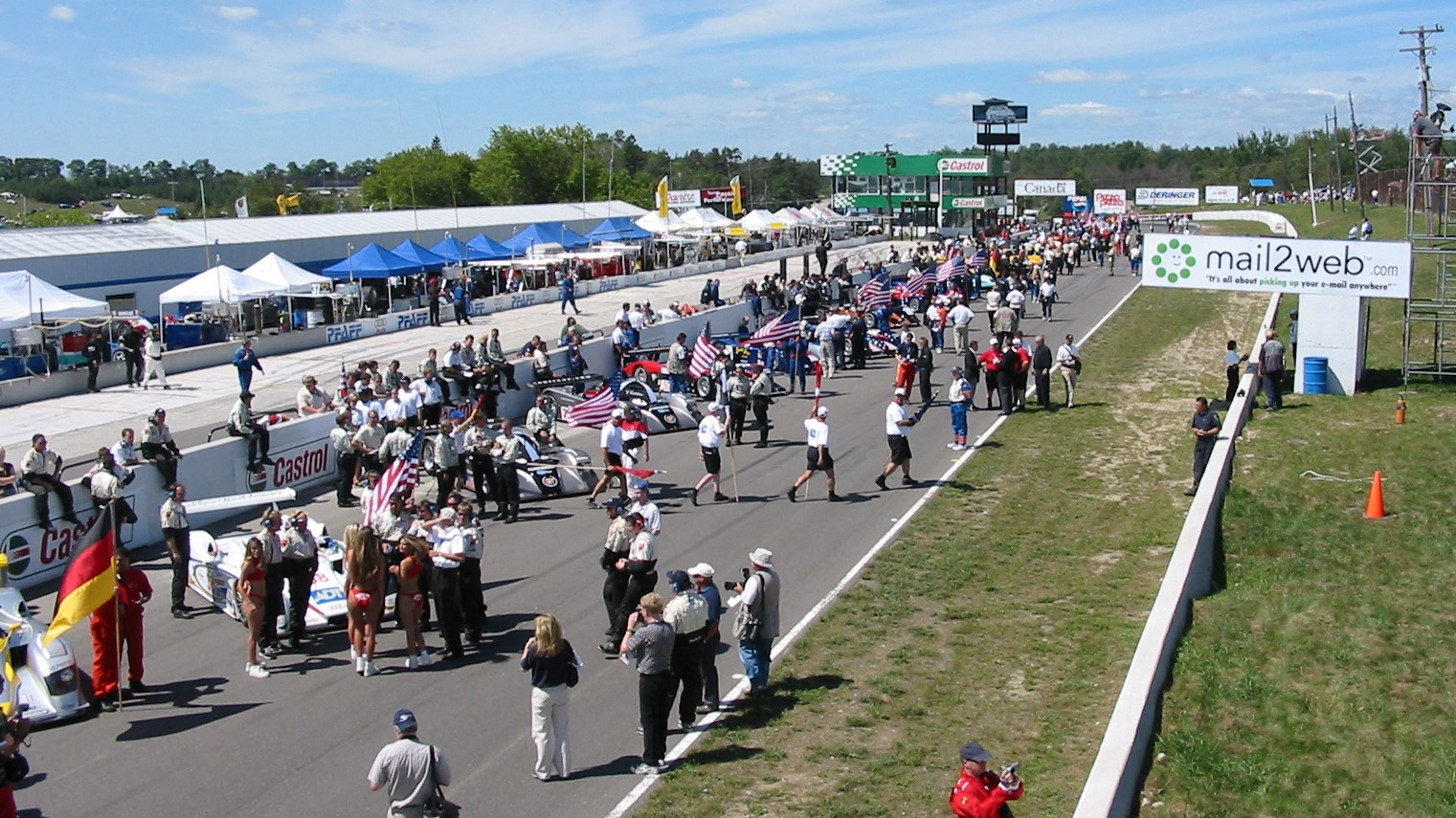
Pre-race grid

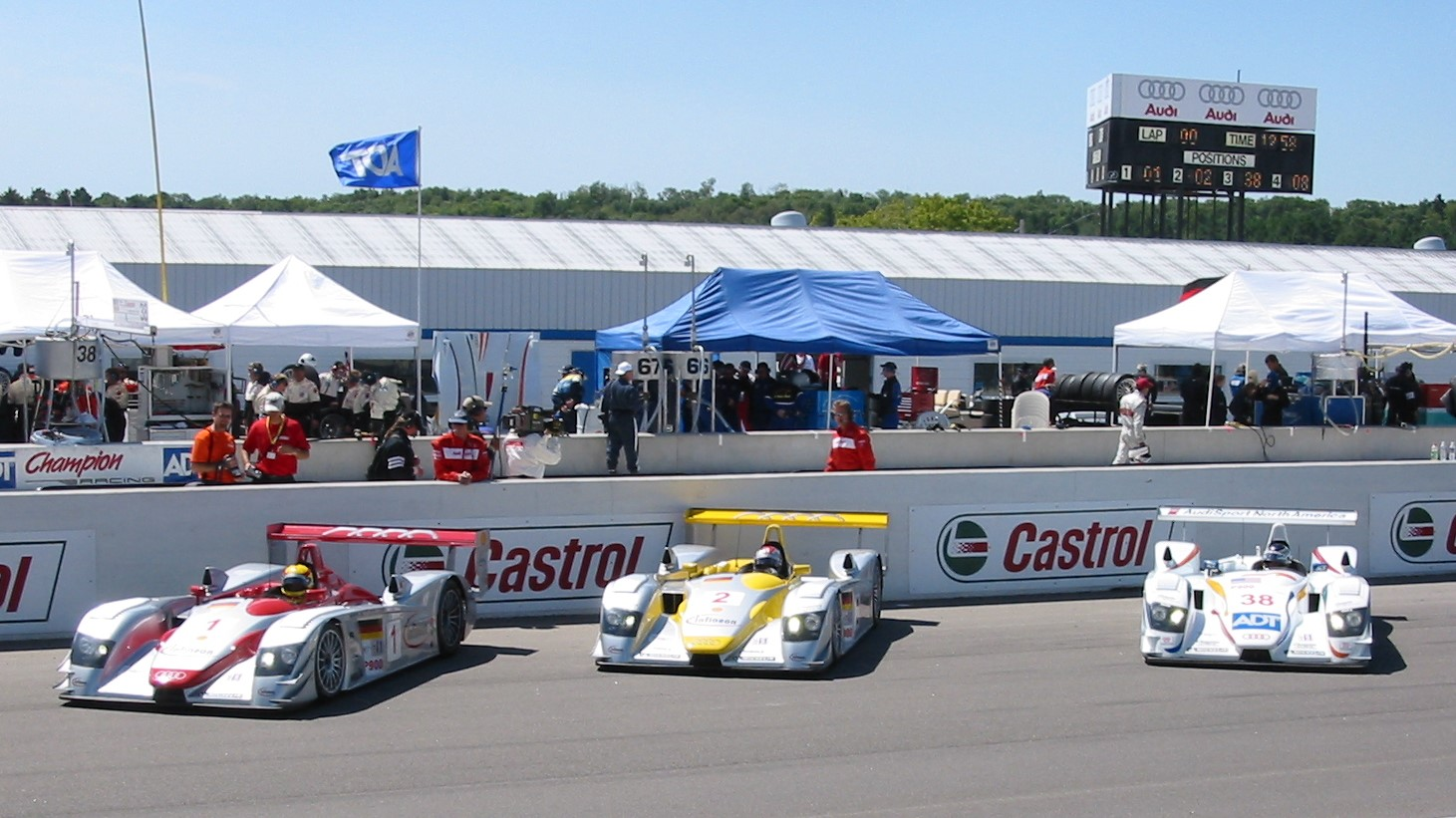
Audi's on the grid

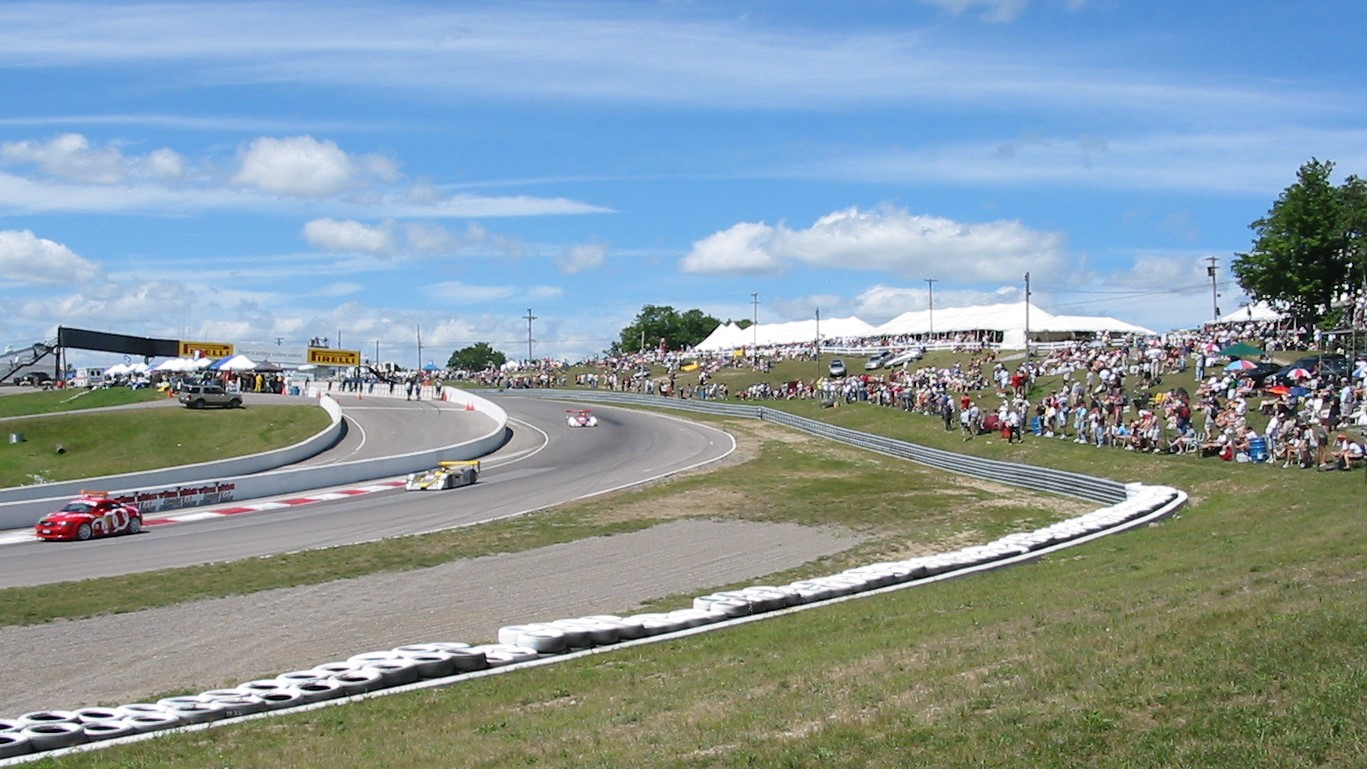
Corner 1 action

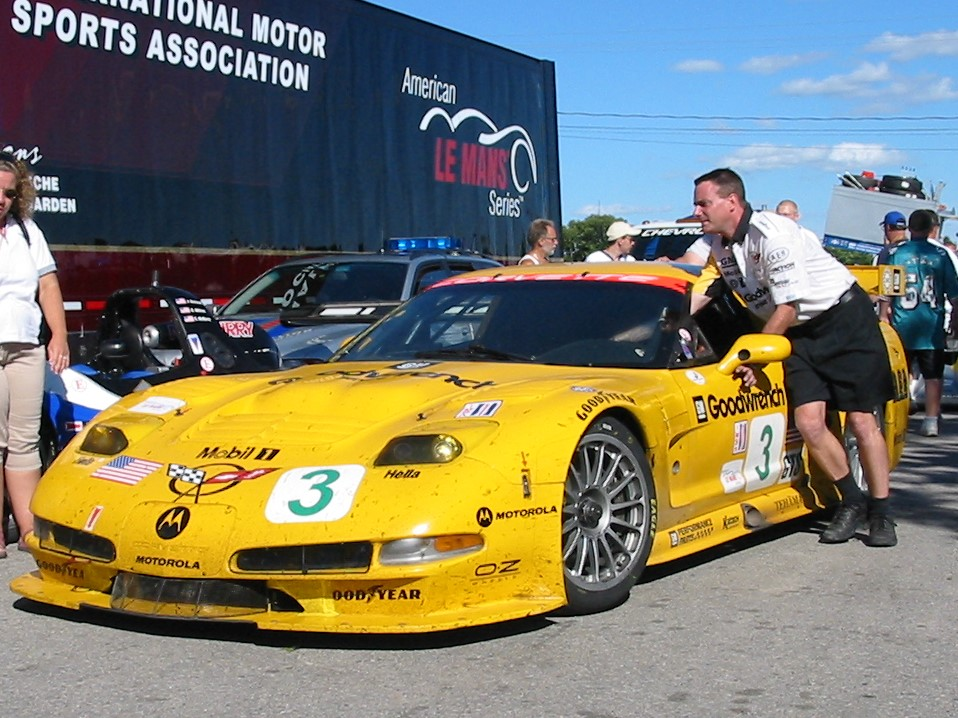
Chevrolet Corvette C5-R - GTS Winner

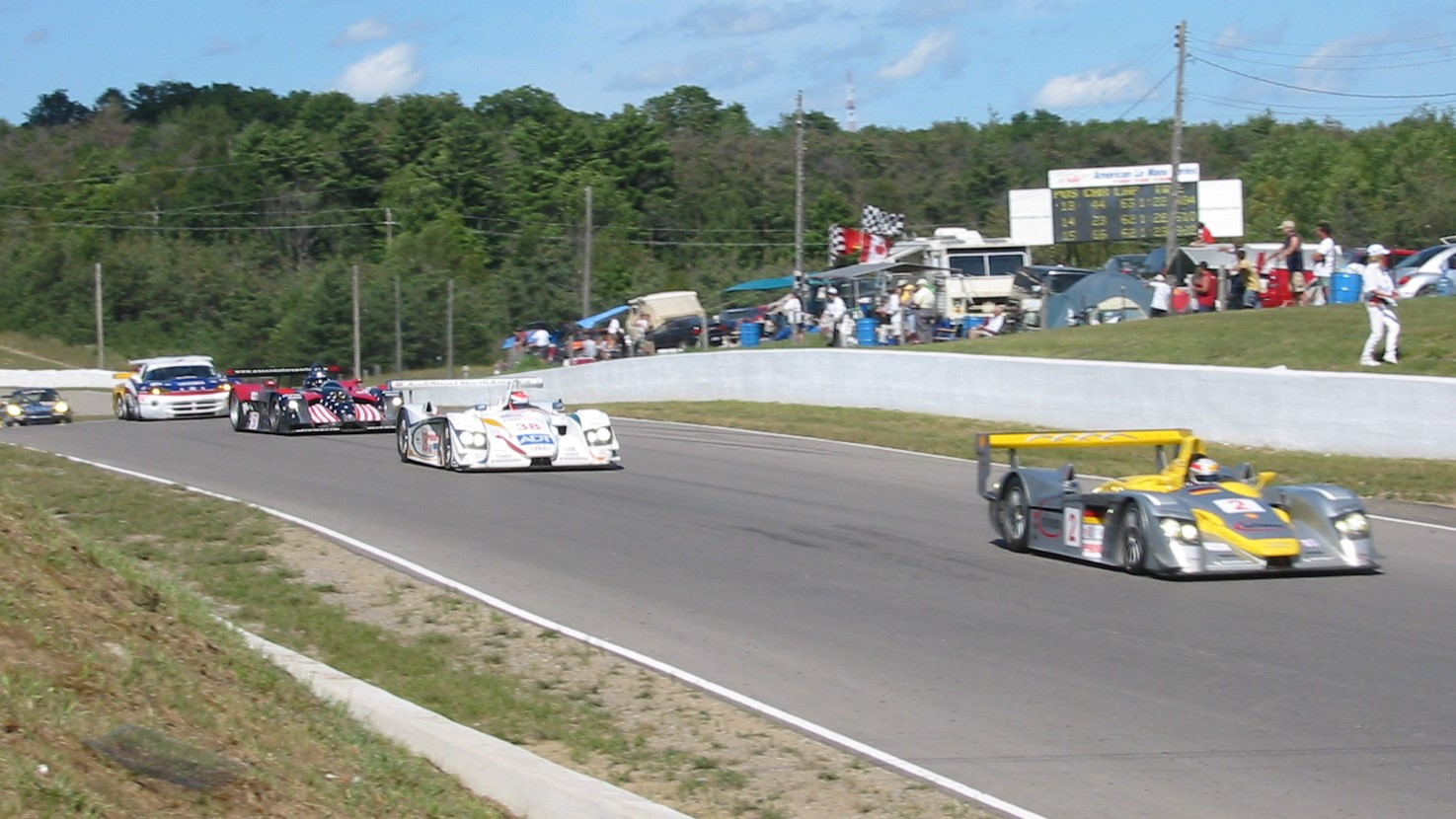
Prototype leaders

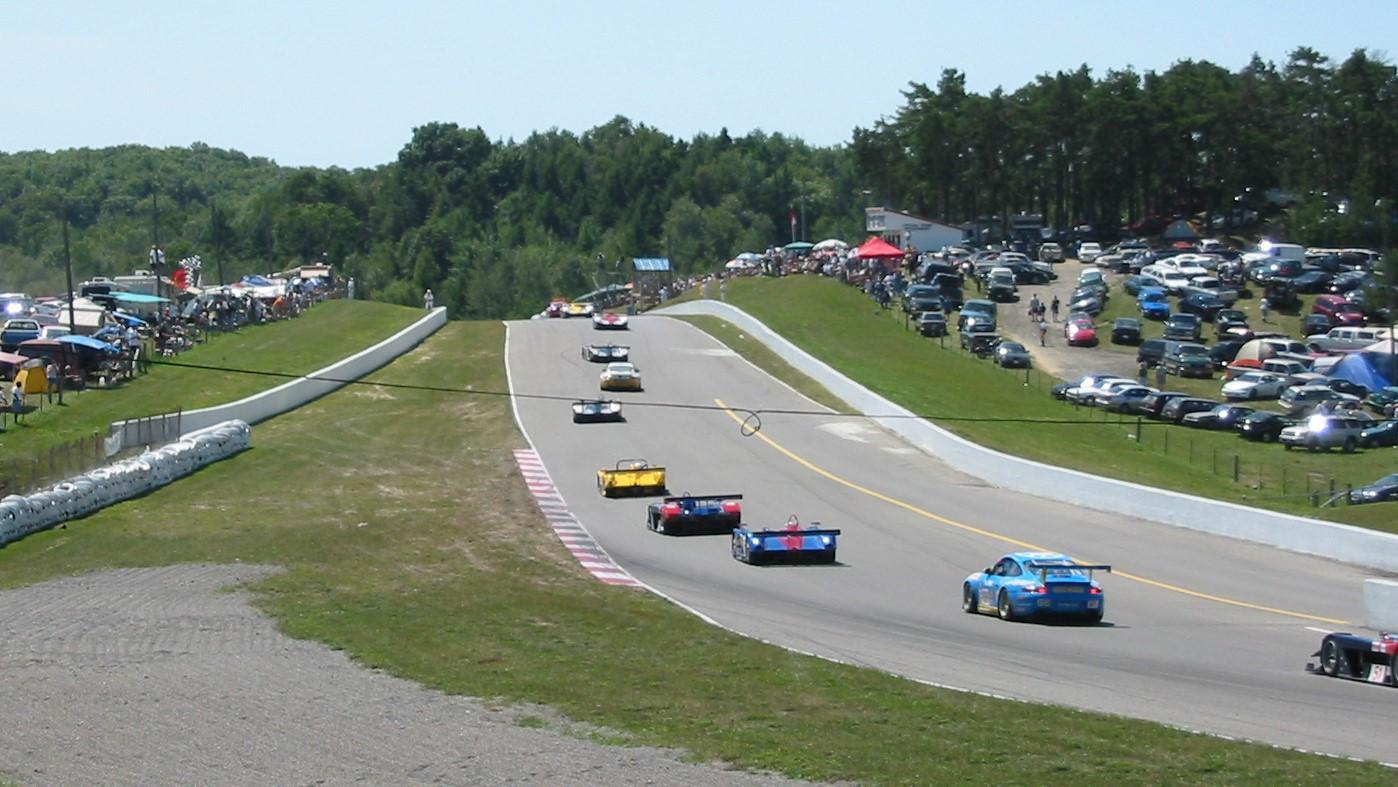
Field approaching Corner 2

American Le Mans Series
Previous race: 2002 Grand Prix de Trois-Rivières	2002 season	Next race: 2002 Monterey Sports Car Championships
