= 2002 Monterey Sports Car Championships =

Track map of Mazda Raceway Laguna Seca

The 2002 Monterey Sports Car Championships was the eighth round of the 2002 American Le Mans Series. It took place at Mazda Raceway Laguna Seca, California, on September 22, 2002.

== Official results ==
Class winners in bold.

Pos	Class	No	Team	Drivers	Chassis	Tyre	Laps
Pos	Class	No	Team	Drivers	Engine	Tyre	Laps
1	**LMP900**	**1**	**(Germany) Audi Sport North America**	**(Italy) Emanuele Pirro (Germany) Frank Biela**	**Audi R8**	M	**112**
1	**LMP900**	**1**	**(Germany) Audi Sport North America**	**(Italy) Emanuele Pirro (Germany) Frank Biela**	**Audi 3.6L Turbo V8**	M	**112**
2	LMP900	38	(United States) Champion Racing	(United Kingdom) Johnny Herbert (Sweden) Stefan Johansson	Audi R8	M	112
2	LMP900	38	(United States) Champion Racing	(United Kingdom) Johnny Herbert (Sweden) Stefan Johansson	Audi 3.6L Turbo V8	M	112
3	LMP900	8	(United States) Team Cadillac	(Italy) Max Angelelli (Finland) JJ Lehto	Cadillac Northstar LMP02	M	111
3	LMP900	8	(United States) Team Cadillac	(Italy) Max Angelelli (Finland) JJ Lehto	Cadillac Northstar 4.0L Turbo V8	M	111
4	LMP900	2	(Germany) Audi Sport North America	(Denmark) Tom Kristensen (Italy) Rinaldo Capello	Audi R8	M	111
4	LMP900	2	(Germany) Audi Sport North America	(Denmark) Tom Kristensen (Italy) Rinaldo Capello	Audi 3.6L Turbo V8	M	111
5	LMP900	50	(United States) Panoz Motor Sports	(Australia) David Brabham (Denmark) Jan Magnussen	Panoz LMP01 Evo	M	110
5	LMP900	50	(United States) Panoz Motor Sports	(Australia) David Brabham (Denmark) Jan Magnussen	Élan 6L8 6.0L V8	M	110
6	LMP900	51	(United States) Panoz Motor Sports	(United States) Bryan Herta (United States) Bill Auberlen	Panoz LMP01 Evo	M	110
6	LMP900	51	(United States) Panoz Motor Sports	(United States) Bryan Herta (United States) Bill Auberlen	Élan 6L8 6.0L V8	M	110
7	**LMP675**	**11**	**(United States) KnightHawk Racing**	**(Germany) Claudia Hürtgen (United States) Steven Knight (United States) Chad Block**	**MG-Lola EX257**	A	**109**
7	**LMP675**	**11**	**(United States) KnightHawk Racing**	**(Germany) Claudia Hürtgen (United States) Steven Knight (United States) Chad Block**	**MG (AER) XP20 2.0L Turbo I4**	A	**109**
8	LMP675	16	(United States) Dyson Racing Team	(United States) Butch Leitzinger (United Kingdom) James Weaver	MG-Lola EX257	G	108
8	LMP675	16	(United States) Dyson Racing Team	(United States) Butch Leitzinger (United Kingdom) James Weaver	MG (AER) XP20 2.0L Turbo I4	G	108
9	LMP675	37	(United States) Intersport	(United States) Jon Field (United States) Rick Sutherland	MG-Lola EX257	G	106
9	LMP675	37	(United States) Intersport	(United States) Jon Field (United States) Rick Sutherland	MG (AER) XP20 2.0L Turbo I4	G	106
10	LMP900	30	(United States) Intersport	(United States) Clint Field (United States) Mark Neuhaus	Lola B2K/10B	G	105
10	LMP900	30	(United States) Intersport	(United States) Clint Field (United States) Mark Neuhaus	Judd GV4 4.0L V10	G	105
11	LMP675	13	(United States) Archangel Motorsports	(United Kingdom) Ben Devlin (United States) Andy Lally	Lola B2K/40	D	105
11	LMP675	13	(United States) Archangel Motorsports	(United Kingdom) Ben Devlin (United States) Andy Lally	Ford (Millington) 2.0L Turbo I4	D	105
12	LMP900	27	(United Kingdom) Chamberlain	(United Kingdom) Christian Vann (Venezuela) Milka Duno	Dome S101	G	104
12	LMP900	27	(United Kingdom) Chamberlain	(United Kingdom) Christian Vann (Venezuela) Milka Duno	Judd GV4 4.0L V10	G	104
13	**GTS**	**33**	**(United Kingdom) Prodrive**	**(Czech Republic) Tomáš Enge (Netherlands) Peter Kox**	**Ferrari 550-GTS Maranello**	M	**104**
13	**GTS**	**33**	**(United Kingdom) Prodrive**	**(Czech Republic) Tomáš Enge (Netherlands) Peter Kox**	**Ferrari 5.9L V12**	M	**104**
14	GTS	26	(Germany) Konrad Motorsport	(Austria) Franz Konrad (United States) Terry Borcheller	Saleen S7-R	P	104
14	GTS	26	(Germany) Konrad Motorsport	(Austria) Franz Konrad (United States) Terry Borcheller	Ford 7.0L V8	P	104
15 DNF	GTS	4	(United States) Corvette Racing	(United States) Andy Pilgrim (United States) Kelly Collins	Chevrolet Corvette C5-R	G	102
15 DNF	GTS	4	(United States) Corvette Racing	(United States) Andy Pilgrim (United States) Kelly Collins	Chevrolet 7.0L V8	G	102
16	**GT**	**23**	**(United States) Alex Job Racing**	**(Germany) Sascha Maassen (Germany) Lucas Luhr**	**Porsche 911 GT3-RS**	M	**100**
16	**GT**	**23**	**(United States) Alex Job Racing**	**(Germany) Sascha Maassen (Germany) Lucas Luhr**	**Porsche 3.6L Flat-6**	M	**100**
17	LMP675	56	(United States) Team Bucknum Racing	(United States) Jeff Bucknum (United States) Chris McMurry (United States) Bryan Willman	Pilbeam MP84	A	100
17	LMP675	56	(United States) Team Bucknum Racing	(United States) Jeff Bucknum (United States) Chris McMurry (United States) Bryan Willman	Nissan (AER) VQL 3.4L V6	A	100
18	LMP675	55	(United States) Team Bucknum Racing	(United States) Bret Arsenault (Germany) Pierre Ehret	Pilbeam MP84	A	99
18	LMP675	55	(United States) Team Bucknum Racing	(United States) Bret Arsenault (Germany) Pierre Ehret	Nissan (AER) VQL 3.0L V6	A	99
19	GT	35	(United States) Risi Competizione	(Germany) Ralf Kelleners (United States) Anthony Lazzaro	Ferrari 360 Modena GT	P	99
19	GT	35	(United States) Risi Competizione	(Germany) Ralf Kelleners (United States) Anthony Lazzaro	Ferrari 3.6L V8	P	99
20	GT	66	(United States) The Racer's Group	(United States) Kevin Buckler (United States) Brian Cunningham	Porsche 911 GT3-RS	M	99
20	GT	66	(United States) The Racer's Group	(United States) Kevin Buckler (United States) Brian Cunningham	Porsche 3.6L Flat-6	M	99
21	GTS	45	(United States) American Viperacing	(United Kingdom) Marino Franchitti (United States) Marc Bunting	Dodge Viper GTS-R	P	97
21	GTS	45	(United States) American Viperacing	(United Kingdom) Marino Franchitti (United States) Marc Bunting	Dodge 8.0L V10	P	97
22	GT	67	(United States) The Racer's Group	(United States) Michael Schrom (United States) Vic Rice	Porsche 911 GT3-RS	M	97
22	GT	67	(United States) The Racer's Group	(United States) Michael Schrom (United States) Vic Rice	Porsche 3.6L Turbo Flat-6	M	97
23	GT	43	(United States) Orbit	(United States) Leo Hindery (United States) Peter Baron	Porsche 911 GT3-RS	M	96
23	GT	43	(United States) Orbit	(United States) Leo Hindery (United States) Peter Baron	Porsche 3.6L Flat-6	M	96
24	GT	52	(Germany) Seikel Motorsport	(United States) Hugh Plumb (New Zealand) Andrew Bagnall (Canada) Tony Burgess	Porsche 911 GT3-RS	Y	96
24	GT	52	(Germany) Seikel Motorsport	(United States) Hugh Plumb (New Zealand) Andrew Bagnall (Canada) Tony Burgess	Porsche 3.6L Flat-6	Y	96
25	GT	22	(United States) Alex Job Racing	(Germany) Timo Bernhard (Germany) Jörg Bergmeister	Porsche 911 GT3-RS	M	96
25	GT	22	(United States) Alex Job Racing	(Germany) Timo Bernhard (Germany) Jörg Bergmeister	Porsche 3.6L Flat-6	M	96
26	GT	83	(United States) Rennwerks Motorsports	(United States) Richard Steranka (United States) Dave Standridge	Porsche 911 GT3-R	D	96
26	GT	83	(United States) Rennwerks Motorsports	(United States) Richard Steranka (United States) Dave Standridge	Porsche 3.6L Flat-6	D	96
27 DNF	GT	79	(United States) J-3 Racing	(United States) Justin Jackson (United States) Mike Fitzgerald	Porsche 911 GT3-RS	P	76
27 DNF	GT	79	(United States) J-3 Racing	(United States) Justin Jackson (United States) Mike Fitzgerald	Porsche 3.6L Flat-6	P	76
28 DNF	LMP900	7	(United States) Team Cadillac	(France) Emmanuel Collard (France) Éric Bernard	Cadillac Northstar LMP02	M	57
28 DNF	LMP900	7	(United States) Team Cadillac	(France) Emmanuel Collard (France) Éric Bernard	Cadillac Northstar 4.0L Turbo V8	M	57
29 DNF	GTS	3	(United States) Corvette Racing	(Canada) Ron Fellows (United States) Johnny O'Connell	Chevrolet Corvette C5-R	G	41
29 DNF	GTS	3	(United States) Corvette Racing	(Canada) Ron Fellows (United States) Johnny O'Connell	Chevrolet 7.0L V8	G	41
30 DNF	GTS	0	(Italy) Team Olive Garden	(Italy) Mimmo Schiattarella (Italy) Emanuele Naspetti	Ferrari 550 Maranello	M	22
30 DNF	GTS	0	(Italy) Team Olive Garden	(Italy) Mimmo Schiattarella (Italy) Emanuele Naspetti	Ferrari 6.0L V12	M	22
31 DNF	GTS	44	(United States) American Viperacing	(United States) Jeff Altenburg (United States) Tom Weickardt	Dodge Viper GTS-R	P	10
31 DNF	GTS	44	(United States) American Viperacing	(United States) Jeff Altenburg (United States) Tom Weickardt	Dodge 8.0L V10	P	10
32 DNF	LMP675	62	(United States) Team Spencer Motorsports	(United States) Dennis Spencer (United States) Rich Grupp (United States) Ryan Hampton	Lola B2K/42	A	9
32 DNF	LMP675	62	(United States) Team Spencer Motorsports	(United States) Dennis Spencer (United States) Rich Grupp (United States) Ryan Hampton	Mazda 1.3L 2-Rotor	A	9

== Statistics ==
- Pole Position - #1 Audi Sport North America - 1:15.765
- Fastest Lap - #2 Audi Sport North America - 1:16.910
- Distance - 403.392 km
- Average Speed - 145.675 km/h

American Le Mans Series
Previous race: 2002 Grand Prix of Mosport	2002 season	Next race: 2002 American Le Mans Challenge
