= Riley & Scott =

American racecar constructor

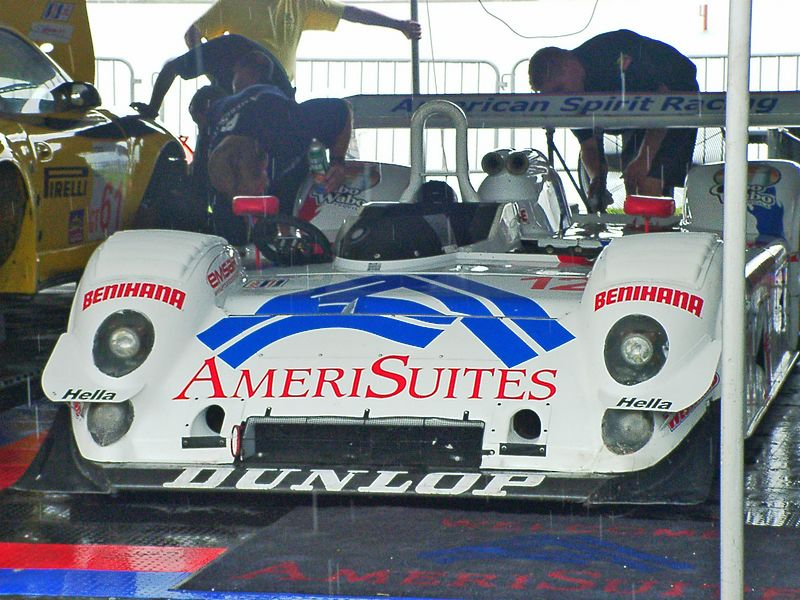
A Riley & Scott Mk III C seen used in the American Le Mans Series in 2003.

Riley & Scott Cars Inc. was an American racing constructor and racing team that primarily provided chassis for various forms of motorsport, but worked primarily in sports car racing. It was founded in 1990 by Bob Riley and Mark Scott.

== History ==
=== Sports car racing ===
Riley & Scott's first program was the development of a chassis for the Trans-Am Series, providing a customer car for numerous competitors. This chassis had much success in the series.

Soon, the company moved to the development of a World Sports Car for the IMSA GT Championship, becoming known as the Mk III. Debuting in 1995, the Mk III went on to win five races in just its debut season. The car eventually earned victories in races such as the 24 Hours of Daytona, and even received customers in Europe for the Sports Racing World Cup as a viable opponent to the Ferrari 333 SP.

At the turn of the 21st century, Riley & Scott expanded their sports car program to include development of the Chevrolet Corvette C5-R for General Motors, then the Cadillac Northstar LMP program as well, using architecture based on their Mk III. The original Mk III itself was also refurbished in 2001, allowing it to continue competition up to 2005.

=== Indy Racing League ===
Riley & Scott was among the new chassis builders selected for the new Indy Racing League in 1997. The MkV IndyCar was competitive out of the box but had few customers because the car was not ready until the 1998 season, by which time most teams had already purchased the competing Dallara or G-Force chassis. A Riley & Scott finished with a 12th-place finish at the 1999 Indianapolis 500. It was eventually replaced by the MkVIII in 2000. Eventual series champion Buddy Lazier took Riley & Scott's sole victory at Phoenix in 2000 before the company withdrew. The Mk VIII was competitive on short ovals but woefully off the pace at Indianapolis and other super-speedways.

=== Sale ===
Reynard Motorsport acquired Riley & Scott in 1999 as part of Reynard's expansion. However, Reynard was not able to survive the expansion as the company went bankrupt in 2001. When Reynard was dissolved, Riley & Scott was dissolved along with it. Co-founder Bob Riley would found his own company, Riley Technologies, to continue construction of various projects in the same year.

== Cars ==
Year	Car	Racing series	Note
1991	Riley & Scott Mk I	Trans-Am Series	Chevrolet body
1997	Riley & Scott Mk II	road car	Hunter, carbon fiber bodywork, roadster, 502 cu in (8.2 L) Chevrolet V8
1995	Riley & Scott Mk III	World Sportscar Championship	
1997	Riley & Scott Mk V	IndyCar Series	
1999	Cadillac Northstar LMP	Le Mans prototype	
2000	Riley & Scott Mk VII	IndyCar Series	
2001	Riley & Scott Mk VIII	Trans-Am Series	Qvale Mangusta body
