= Cadillac Northstar LMP =

Series of Le Mans Prototypes

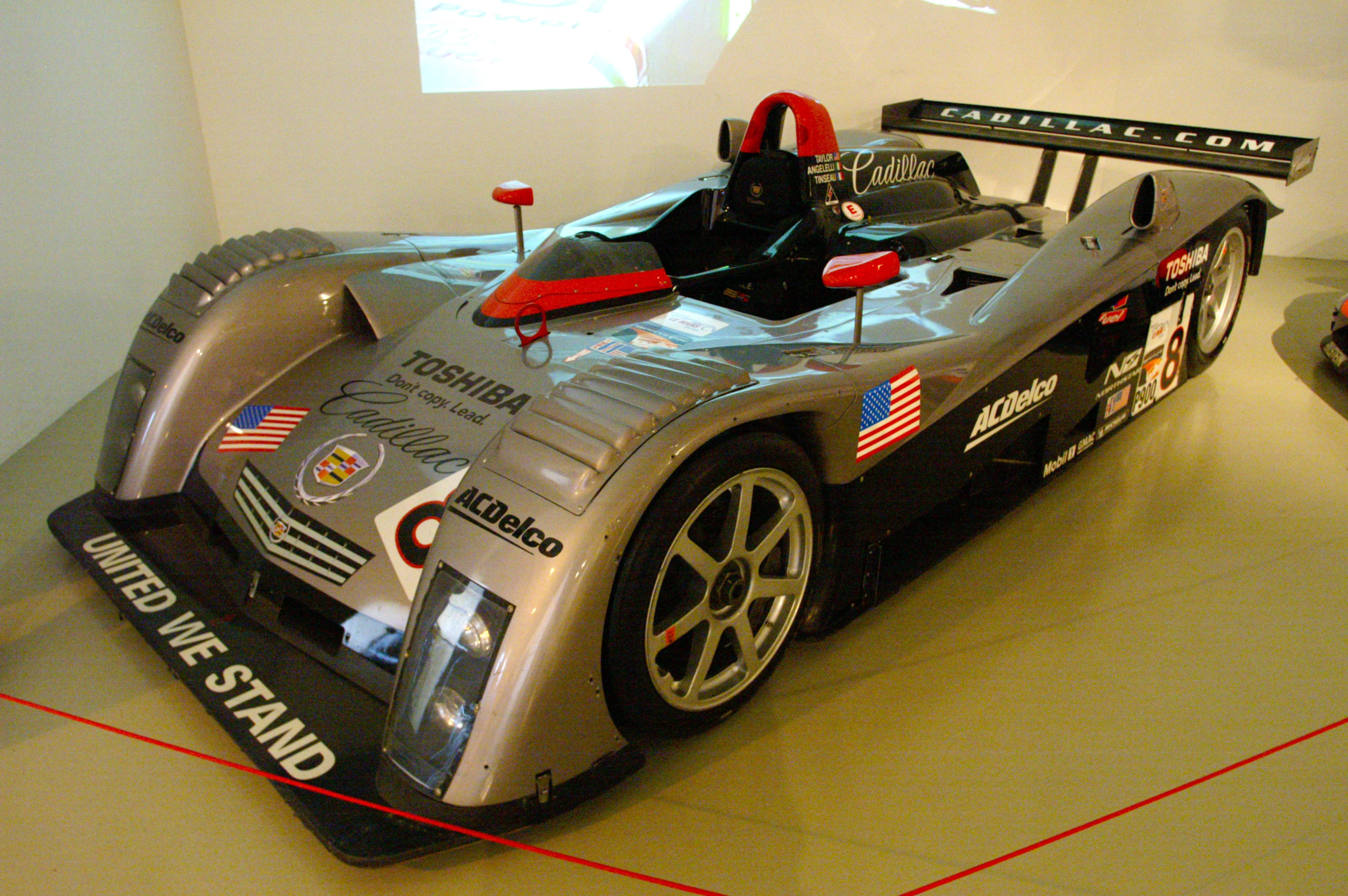
Cadillac Northstar LMP 900 at the Le Mans Museum

The Cadillac Northstar LMP are a series of Le Mans Prototypes built by Cadillac for use in the American Le Mans Series as well as an attempt to return Cadillac to the 24 Hours of Le Mans since they first entered in 1950. The Northstar LMPs were named after the Northstar V8 engines which powered them. The Cadillac project ran from 2000 until 2002 when General Motors decided to cancel the project to concentrate solely on their Chevrolet Corvette program. Cadillac returned to prototype racing in 2017 with the Cadillac DPi-V.R in the WeatherTech SportsCar Championship.

== Development ==
=== 2000 ===
In planning the new Cadillac LMP project, GM turned to Riley & Scott, builders of the successful Mk III chassis. Riley & Scott developed a from-scratch LMP based around a bespoke carbon fiber monocoque. The new design featured elements of Cadillac's new Art & Science design theme such as the functional egg-crate grill on the nose, as well as the addition of large side scoops to feed the turbochargers.

A highly modified 650 hp (485 kW) version of this engine was used by General Motors racing division initially for Indy Racing League competition starting in 1995, then was later used in the Cadillac Northstar LMP program in 2000. Both engines retained the 4.0 L capacity, but the Northstar LMP version was twin-turbocharged. The engine for the Northstar LMP was based on a smaller 4.0 Liter variant of the Northstar used in Cadillacs, known as the L47, used in GM's Oldsmobile Aurora sedan. It had already been adapted for racing in 1995 for use in the Indy Racing League, but was thoroughly modified in order to not only increase power, but increase longevity. McLaren Engines assisted in the development of the new prototype engine, while Ishikawajima-Harima Heavy Industries (IHI) produced twin turbochargers to increase output.

A total of seven monocoques were built, with two going to Team Cadillac in the United States, three to DAMS in France, one assigned as the crash test car (became the show car), and one spare tub that was delivered to GM at the end of the program.

=== 2001 ===
For 2001, the Northstar LMP was evolved in order to make it more competitive against the Audi R8s. Although still based on the Riley & Scott chassis, the bodywork was completely redesigned by Nigel Stroud. A more angular approach was used, especially on the sides of the car, with the sidepods no longer being flat horizontal but instead diving downward towards the front wheel arch. The air cooling ducts were also relocated from the side of the car, and instead placed inside the wheel wells, allowing for air exits from the wheel wells to be added to the new side. The Cadillac-theme grill was also revised, no longer being a functional open piece.

Beyond the bodywork, not much else was changed on the new car, known as the Northstar LMP01. Two of the previous 2000-spec cars were upgraded to the 2001 bodywork, while a third car was built fresh.

=== 2002 ===
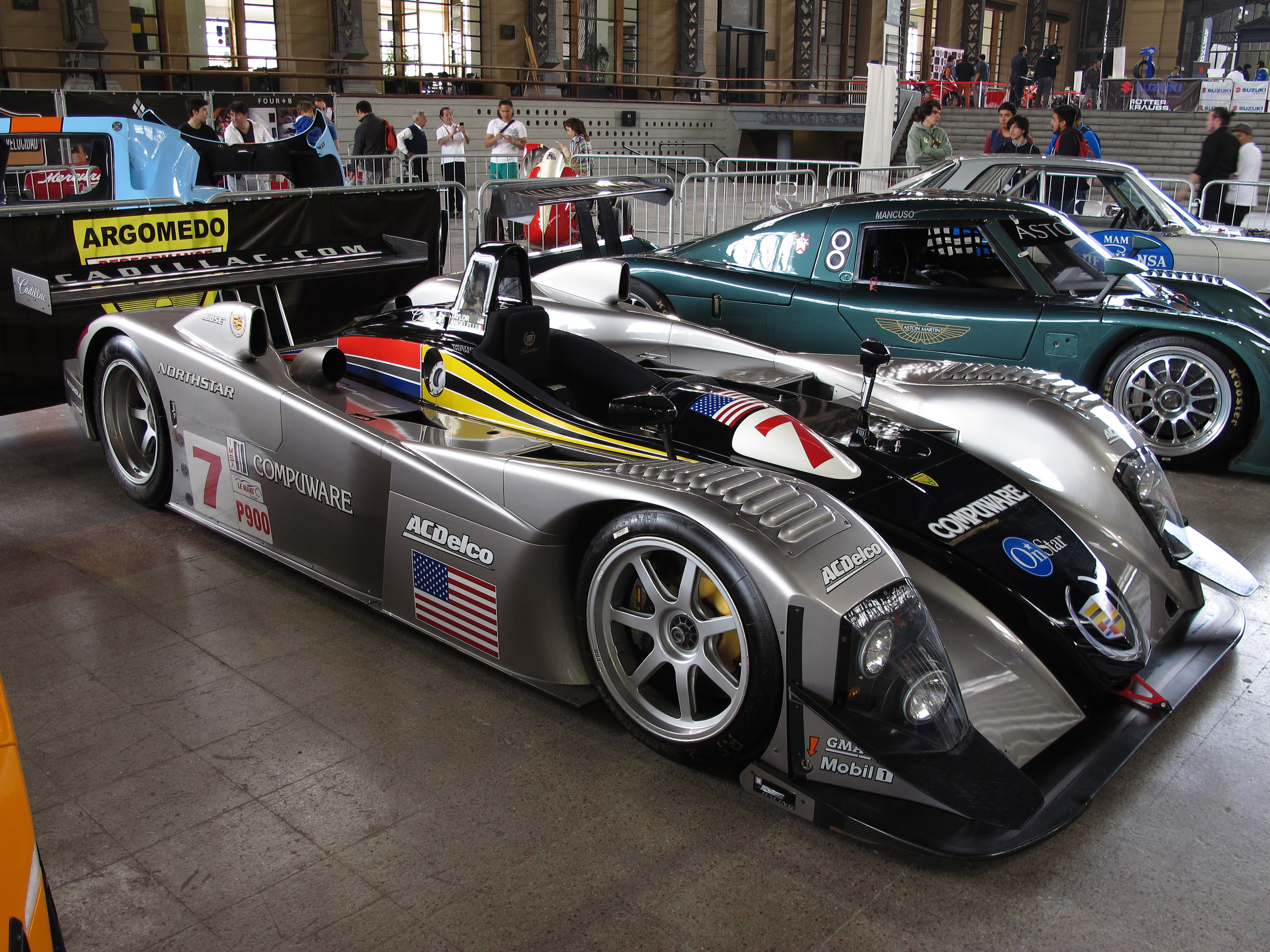
Cadillac Northstar LMP02

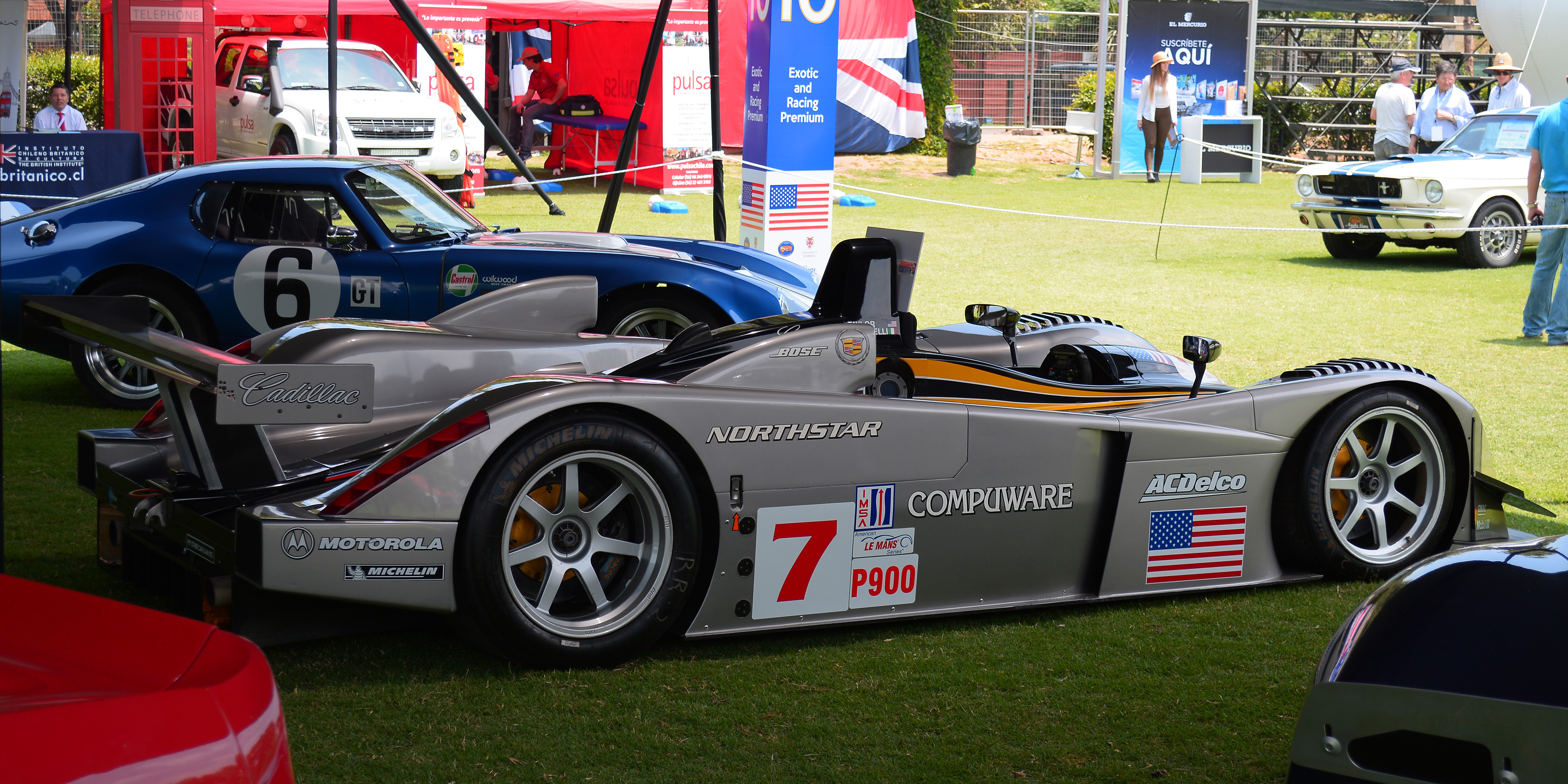
Cadillac Northstar LMP02 rear

Following two years of development of the Northstar V8 engine, Cadillac used 2002 to debut their new custom-built chassis. No longer relying on Riley & Scott, the new Northstar LMP02 was designed by Nigel Stroud to be a completely different machine. Although retaining some of the aerodynamic features of the Northstar LMP01, the new car featured a much more angular design. Among the most noticeable features is the use of a raised footbox in the nose, allowing for a large air intake in the center and no longer employing the use of a stylized grill. The air exits on the side were also closed down to a minimum width, leaving the design much cleaner.

In the engine department, the Northstar V8 was slightly altered, with the use of new Garrett turbochargers replacing the IHI units. A new pneumatic shift system was also employed for the X-Trac gearbox.

A total of three all new chassis were built for the Northstar LMP02.

== Racing history ==
=== 2000 ===
For Cadillac's debut in 2000, GM decided to employ the use of two teams in two different championships in an attempt to maximize their preparation for Le Mans. Riley & Scott would run the factory team in the American Le Mans Series under the name Team Cadillac, while Team DAMS of France would run a customer team in the European Sports Racing World Cup.

For the 24 Hours of Daytona, the first race of the year, Team Cadillac would debut their two cars. Alongside their Chevrolet Corvette teammates, the Northstar LMPs performed well early on, taking second and third in qualifying. During the race the cars ran on pace, although after problems they found themselves nearly 100 laps behind the leading grand tourer cars. Although one car suffered a gearbox failure in the closing moments of the race, both cars were classified as finishers, taking 13th and 14th places. This was followed by the 12 Hours of Sebring, which saw both Team Cadillac and Team DAMS would be entered, with Cadillac running two cars and DAMS one. The teams suffered some difficulties, with the DAMS entry breaking a clutch and one of the Team Cadillac entries being involved in an accident. However, the third Northstar LMP was able to finish the race and take an encouraging sixth place, although it was 29 laps behind the winning Audi R8.

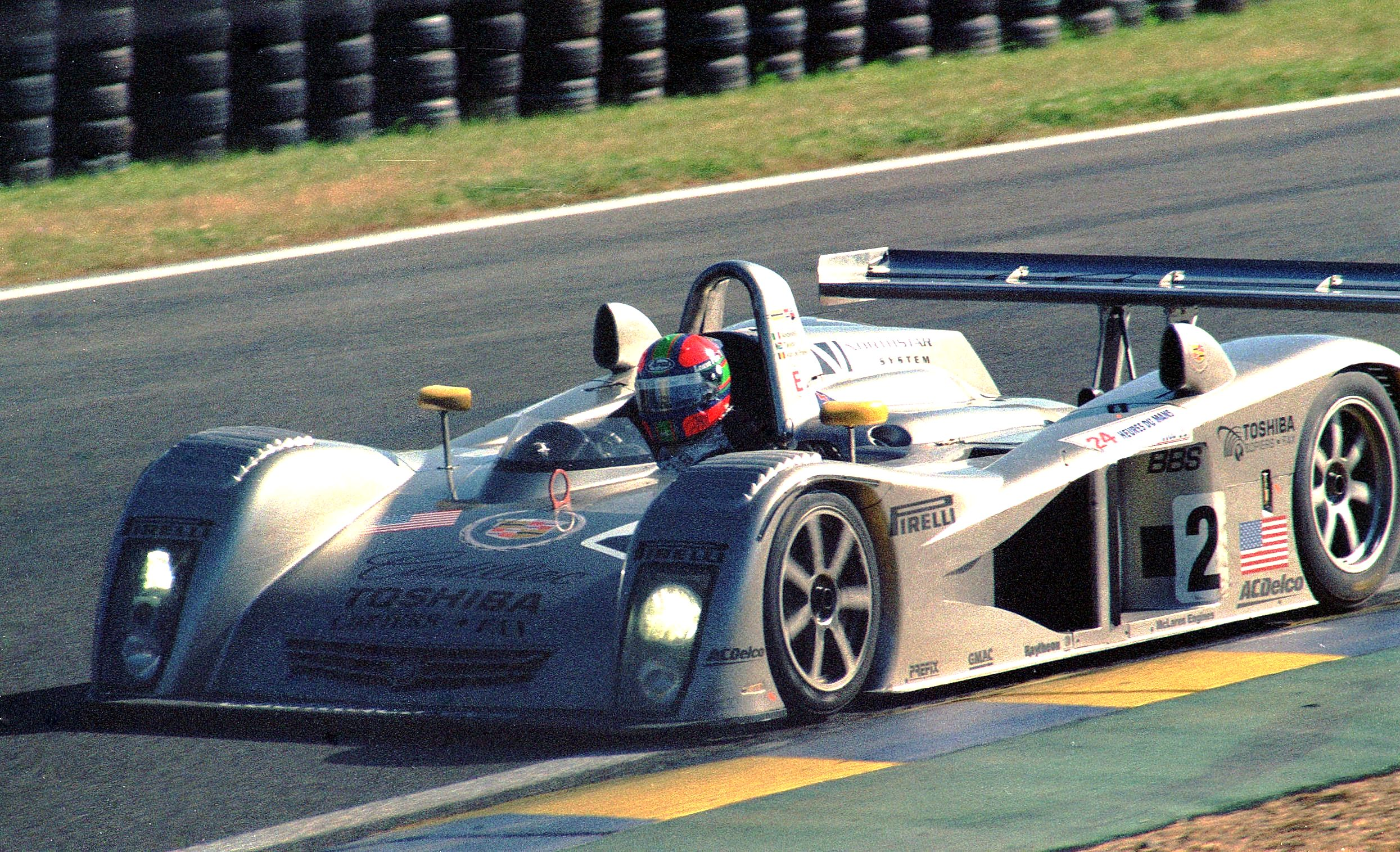
Cadillac Northstar LMP at the 2000 24 Hours of Le Mans

Returning to Europe, DAMS debuted their first two car effort at the initial race of the Sports Racing World Cup. There, the team managed to take home seventh and eighth places, a mere three laps behind the winning Ferrari 333 SP. DAMS would go on to take a fourth-place finish at the next round, although the other team car failed to finish. At this time, the American Le Mans Series was having their first races in Europe. DAMS entered their two car effort in place of Team Cadillac, managing to take fifth at Silverstone Circuit. DAMS would make one more Sports Racing World Cup appearance in May prior to going to Le Mans, where both cars did not finish.

Team Cadillac on the other hand, believing that private testing would be better for the Northstar LMP, would not return to the American Le Mans Series prior to flying to France for the 24 Hours of Le Mans. The cars lacked the pace necessary to compete with the major manufacturers in their class. Although a DAMS entry managed to qualify ninth, the sister car could muster only the 20th fastest lap time. The pace was equally off in the race, and mechanical woes saw only three Northstar LMPs finish, a disappointing 19th, 21st, and 22nd.

Following Le Mans, DAMS participated in the second ALMS event in Europe, again taking fifth place, this time at the Nürburgring. Returning to America, Team Cadillac finally returned to action with a single car at Portland International Raceway, managing eighth place. Petit Le Mans would see DAMS return to the United States as well, with the four car Cadillac effort seeing better results. All cars managed to finish, with the result of 6th, 7th, 8th, and 13th. Team Cadillac would record one final finish for the year at Laguna Seca with a seventh-place finish before the time retired for the season, skipping the Las Vegas round. DAMS made Cadillac's final appearance of the year at the Adelaide Street Circuit in Australia. DAMS would finish a distant 19th and 20th places.

At the end of the season, due to Team Cadillac's private testing, DAMS actually finished higher in the American Le Mans Series championship, taking seventh place over Cadillac's eighth. In addition to this, DAMS points in the Sports Racing World Cup would earn them eighth in that championship.

=== 2001 ===
For the new season, General Motors decided to alter their strategy. Cadillac would prepare solely for the 24 Hours of Le Mans with private testing, with DAMS running only a two-car effort at the race. Team Cadillac would assist in the effort, but then would run the American Le Mans Series only after Le Mans, when testing of the new Northstar LMP01 would be no longer necessary since General Motors was already aware that the all new Northstar LMP02 was in development.

At Le Mans, the DAMS entries showed the speed potential of the Northstar V8s by taking eighth in qualifying, beating out a new Bentley EXP Speed 8, two of the Chrysler LMPs, and the Panoz squad. During the race, one of the Northstar LMP01s was taken out in an early accident, but the sole surviving car managed to improve on the team's performance from last year by taking 15th place.

Now returning to the United States, Team Cadillac began their involvement in the American Le Mans Series season at Sears Point. Both cars suffered problems, and were only able to finish 12th and 24th. Skipping Portland, the Cadillacs returned at Mosport and recorded their best finish ever, taking third and fourth places. After a seven- and eighth-place finish at Mid-Ohio, the cars would take fourth and fifth at Laguna Seca, before finishing the season with another fourth- and fifth-place finish at the Petit Le Mans. Although Cadillac ran only half of the season, the team managed to be tied for fourth in the teams championship that year.

=== 2002 ===
With the all new Northstar LMP02, Team Cadillac prepared once again for the 24 Hours of Le Mans. Team DAMS was no longer involved in the project, leaving the American team to do all development of the new car. Once again the decision was made to concentrate on private testing prior to Le Mans, although this year Cadillac would run the 12 Hours of Sebring.

The year did not start well for the Northstar LMP02 at Sebring. One car suffered a failed electronics system towards the end of the race, while the sole remaining car came home a disappointing 31st. Moving to Le Mans, the Cadillac showed its speed in qualifying once again by taking the eighth and tenth fastest qualifying times, beating out both an Audi and a Bentley. However the race itself saw the Northstar LMP02 show its potential, with both cars running in the top ten for most of the race. Cadillac managed to take home ninth and twelfth places in the end, their best Le Mans result since the start of the program.

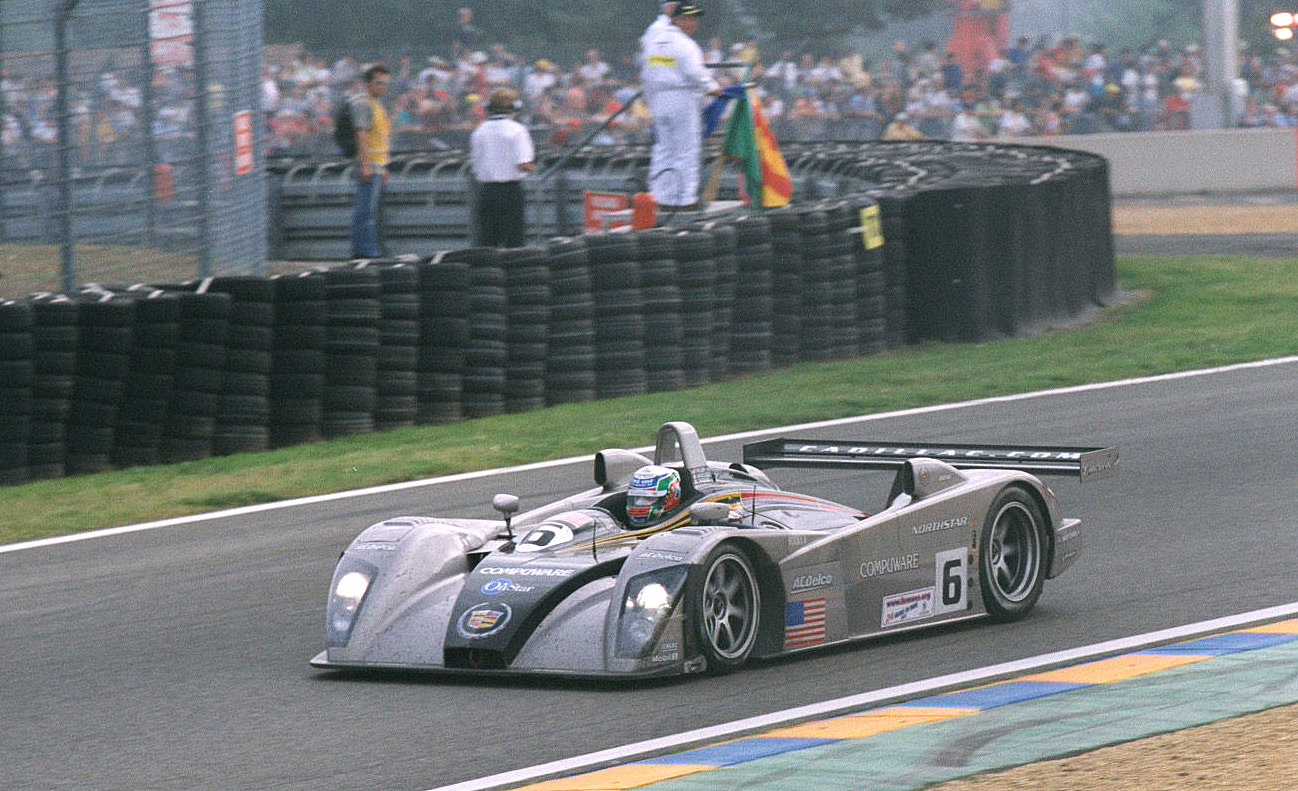
The No. 6 Northstar LMP finished ninth at Le Mans.

Returning to the United States, Cadillac saw competition again in Washington D.C., where the team managed to take a fourth-place finish, only a single lap behind the winners. Skipping Trois-Rivieres, Mosport saw the Northstar LMP02s finish third and sixth, followed by another third at Laguna Seca. Cadillac's best race ever would finally come on the streets of Miami, where the LMP02 of JJ Lehto and Max Angelelli would take second place, a mere fourteen seconds behind the winning Audi. The final race of the year, Petit Le Mans, would see Cadillac coming home in third and fourth. Once again, with only half a season, Cadillac would manage an impressive fifth in the championship.

At the end of 2002, General Motors announced that the Cadillac project would not continue into 2003. Feeling that the Cadillac program had achieved what General Motors believed it was meant to, the project was canceled and GM would move to concentrating solely on their more successful Chevrolet Corvette program. General Motors would not offer any of the Northstar LMPs for sale to privateer customers, instead retaining the cars for themselves.

In 2009 GM decided to sell some of their specialty cars that were featured in the GM Museum. The Cadillac LMP #8 (Chassis #02-002) was for the first time sold to a privateer.

== Chassis history ==
A total of seven Riley & Scott-built Northstar LMP and Northstar LMP01s would be built, while a further three Northstar LMP02s would be built. Team Cadillac and DAMS would be the only teams to run the cars.

#LMP-00-001

- crash test car and show car, never raced

#LMP-00-002

- 2000 (DAMS)

ALMS Sebring: DNF
SRWC Barcelona: 7th
SRWC Monza: 4th
ALMS Silverstone: DNF
SRWC Spa: DNF
Le Mans: DNF

- Damaged in Le Mans fire, replaced by #LMP-00-006

#LMP-00-003

- 2000 (Team Cadillac)

GARRC Daytona: 14th
ALMS Sebring: 6th
Le Mans: 21st
ALMS Petit Le Mans: 8th

#LMP-00-004

- 2000 (Team Cadillac)

GARRC Daytona: 13th
ALMS Sebring: DNF
Le Mans: 22nd
ALMS Portland: 8th
ALMS Petit Le Mans: 7th
ALMS Laguna Seca: 7th

- 2001 (Team Cadillac)

Le Mans: 15th (run by DAMS)
ALMS Sears Point: DNF
ALMS Mosport: 4th
ALMS Mid-Ohio: 7th
ALMS Laguna Seca: 4th
ALMS Petit Le Mans: 4th

#LMP-00-005

- 2000 (DAMS)

SRWC Barcelona: 8th
SRWC Monza: DNF
ALMS Silverstone: 5th
SRWC Spa: DNF
Le Mans: 19th
ALMS Nürburgring: 16th
ALMS Petit Le Mans: 6th
ALMS Adelaide: DNF

#LMP-00-006

- 2000 (DAMS)

ALMS Nürburgring: 5th
ALMS Petit Le Mans: 13th
ALMS Adelaide: DNF

- 2001 (Team Cadillac)

ALMS Sears Point: 12th
ALMS Mosport: 3rd
ALMS Mid-Ohio: 8th
ALMS Laguna Seca: 5th
ALMS Petit Le Mans: 5th

#LMP-00-007

- Spare monocoque delivered to GM at end of program.

#LMP-02-001

- 2002 (Team Cadillac)

ALMS Sebring: DNF

#LMP-02-002

- 2002 (Team Cadillac)

ALMS Sebring: 31st
Le Mans: 9th
ALMS Washington: 4th
ALMS Mosport: 3rd
ALMS Laguna Seca: 3rd
ALMS Miami: 2nd
ALMS Petit Le Mans: 3rd

#LMP-02-003

- 2002 (Team Cadillac)

Le Mans: 12th
ALMS Washington: DNF
ALMS Mosport: 6th
ALMS Laguna Seca: DNF
ALMS Miami: 7th
ALMS Petit Le Mans: 4th

== See also ==
- Northstar engine series
- Cadillac DPi-V.R
