= MG-Lola EX257 =

Le Mans Prototype racing car

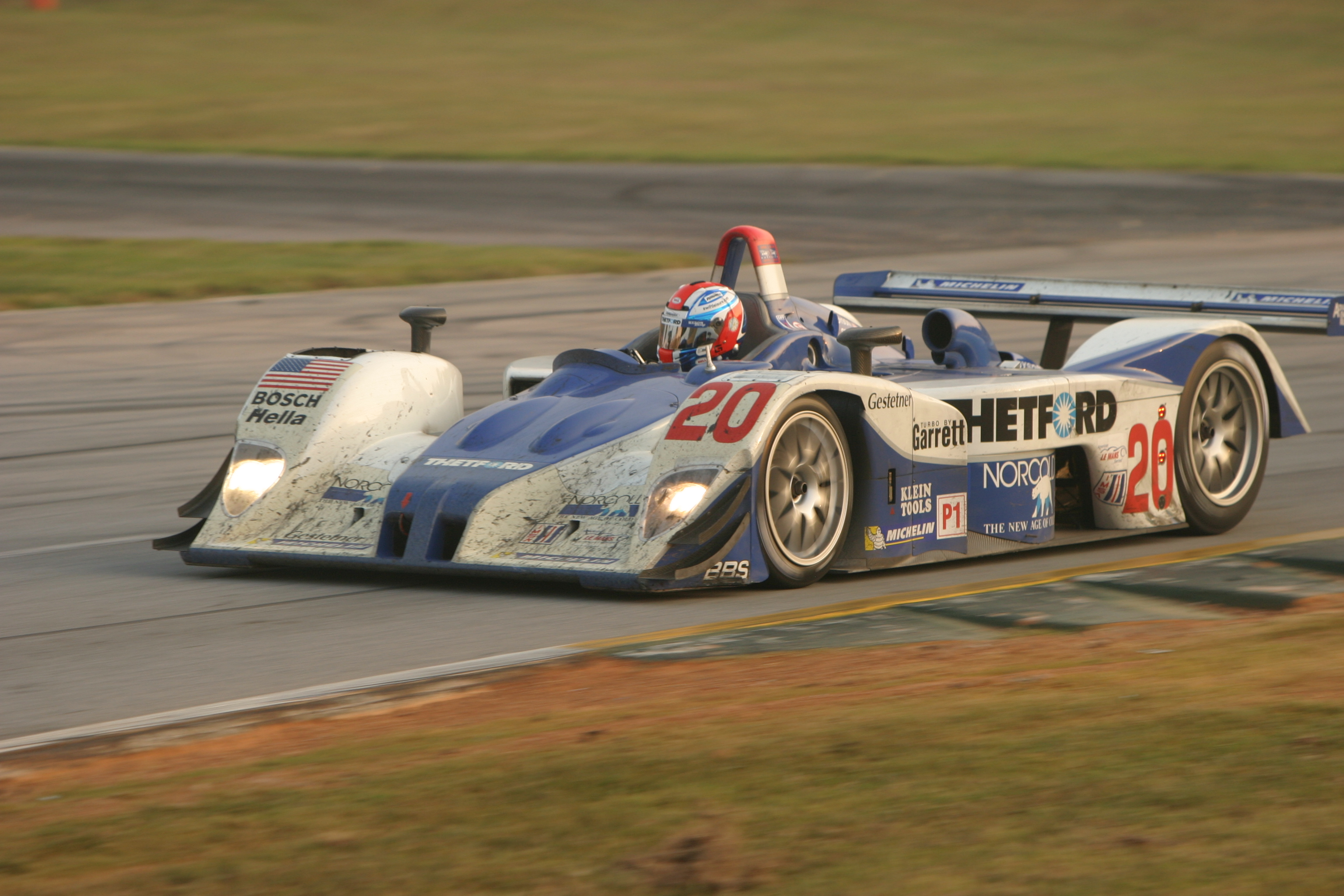
Dyson Racing's MG-Lola EX257 at the 2005 Petit Le Mans.

The MG-Lola EX257 (sometimes referred to as simply MG EX257) is a Le Mans Prototype racing car built by Lola for the MG car company for their attempt to compete again at the 24 Hours of Le Mans in 2001. The car has had many years of mixed success since its introduction, even in privateer hands.

It was Lola's only car built specifically to LMP675 regulations, and was known by their designation as the Lola B01/60. The last EX257 in original specification was retired from racing in 2007.

== Development ==
Following a resurgence for the MG brand in the beginnings of the 21st century, the decision was made to expand the brand into motorsports including touring car and sports car racing. MG had previously had success at the 24 Hours of Le Mans many decades ago, yet had never scored an overall win. At approximately the same time, the Automobile Club de l'Ouest (ACO) had changed the Le Mans Prototype regulations for Le Mans, making it possible for two different classes of prototype to be capable of taking an overall win. This class, known as LMP675, would use smaller turbocharged engines yet would be lighter and more nimble, making it possible for them to compete with the larger, more powerful LMP900 class.

Seeing an opportunity to use a production-based engine in an LMP675 instead of a custom-built engine that would be larger than anything MG had in their production cars at the time, MG decided to enter into this new class in agreement with Lola Cars International. Lola had previously built cars in 2000, known as the B2K/10 and B2K/40, but they were not designed with the LMP675 regulations in mind. Lola would therefore have to build an all-new prototype design that would center on the light weight and small engines of LMP675. Since the B2K/40 was more similar to the LMP675 regulations, many design elements of it were brought over for the new car, which Lola designated B01/60. The front fender design of the B01/60 was nearly identical to that of the B2K/40, but the nose of the car was radically different, incorporating a large square airbox (shaped like an MG grill) in the raised nose. The sidepods were also radically different, using sweeping lines to better manage airflow both in and out of the car. A large single air inlet was placed on the top of the car, slightly off to the side of the cockpit in order to house the turbo inlet. Using a design element borrowed from the Audi R8, a single rollbar was used behind the driver, instead of a long rollbar that covered the entire width of the cockpit. In the rear, the wing was mounted low on the chassis in order to increase overall top speed. In the end, the EX257 was very light at approximately 690 kg at its launch (675 kg being the minimum allowed by the rules).

For an engine, MG turned to Advanced Engine Research (AER) for construction of their engine and Garrett for turbocharging it. Using some elements of MG's production engines, the new 2.0 Litre turbocharged Inline-4 known as the MG XP20 (AER designation P07) came to approximately 500 hp, limited by air restrictors put in place by the ACO to equalize cars.

=== Modifications ===
In 2003, the Intersport Racing team considered that the MG engine was lacking the power necessary for tracks used in the American Le Mans Series. The team transplanted a Judd KV675 naturally aspirated V8 engine in place of the MG XP20. This required the removal of the large turbo inlet, replacing it with an air inlet mounted behind the cockpit. This car, referred to by its Lola designation only due to the loss of the MG engine, had a short career with some success.

== Racing history ==
The new MG-Lola EX257 made its competition debut at the 2001 24 Hours of Le Mans, with two cars being run by MG Sport & Racing Ltd. The new cars showed their pace, qualifying 14th and 17th overall, the fastest two times amongst LMP675. The problems with the LMP675 formula showed their signs early in the race. Although quick even with their small engines, these engines were highly stressed and lacked the capabilities to survive long distances. Following a mere 30 laps, one MG was forced to retire due to exhaust failure. A few hours later, the second MG succumbed to an oil leak, removing MG from competition at the very early stage of the event.

For 2002, the EX257s were offered to customers for the first time. Two American teams, KnightHawk Racing and Intersport Racing, would seize the opportunity and purchase one chassis each, for competition throughout the American Le Mans Series season. Improvements to the EX257 provided greater durability, as shown at Sebring with Intersport taking the LMP675 win and seventh overall, while KnightHawk took third in LMP675. Over the rest of the season, the pair of EX257s dominated the series, taking four more wins. KnightHawk took the LMP675 championship by a single point over Intersport. Also, for the final four races of the season, a third EX257 joined the series, in the hands of Dyson Racing, who managed fifth in the championship although taking part in just a handful of races.

Back at Le Mans, the factory MG team again returned with their two EX257s. Their reliability was improved, as both cars survived further than they had the previous year, although in the end, they still failed to finish. Gearbox problems eliminated one car after 129 laps. The second car was running strong until the final few hours of the race, when the engine let go. The American KnightHawk team also participated, but their car succumbed to fire during the night.

After two years of failing to finish at Le Mans and financial strain on the MG Rover Group, the sports car project was cancelled. However, Lola continued to sell the cars to customers, offering continued technical support along with Advanced Engine Research. In the American Le Mans Series, KnightHawk Racing left; its place was taken by a second Dyson Racing EX257. Both Dyson and Intersport traded wins off during the entire season, with the EX257 winning every race that year to give Dyson the championship. Notably, the #16 Dyson entry, piloted by James Weaver and Butch Leitzinger, took an overall victory at the Infineon Raceway round, the only time an LMP675 car had pulled off an upset over LMP900 competitors. However, Intersport made an unusual decision ahead of the final race, Petit Le Mans, by replacing the turbocharged MG engine with a new naturally aspirated Judd KV675 V8. This forced the team to make some mechanical changes to their car (now referred to as B01/60), but it proved successful as the team went on to take the LMP675 win. Even with this perfect season for the EX257, Le Mans still saw problems. A single entry from Intersport failed to finish yet again, due to an engine failure after a mere 102 laps.

The ACO decided to alter the Le Mans Prototype rules due to the inherent problems of the LMP675 class. The classes were restructured into LMP1 and LMP2, with the MG's moved into the top LMP1 class. Over in Europe, Ray Mallock Ltd. carried on the MG name in the new Le Mans Endurance Series. The car performed well over the short season, finishing every race and achieving a best finish of fifth, earning them a fifth-place finish in the teams' championship. In America, Dyson continued with their two-car squad, while Intersport continued with their Judd-powered entry. The success of the previous year could not be repeated, as Dyson found themselves in the same class as the dominant Audi R8. Although Dyson was able to score an overall victory against the R8s at Mosport, the team had to settle for second in the championship. Intersport's hybrid car, on the other hand, performed poorly, managing to score points in only two races. For Le Mans, both Ray Mallock, Ltd. and Intersport participated, but once again neither car finished. Intersport's car was taken out in an accident, while RML's entry blew its engine during the closing hours of the race.

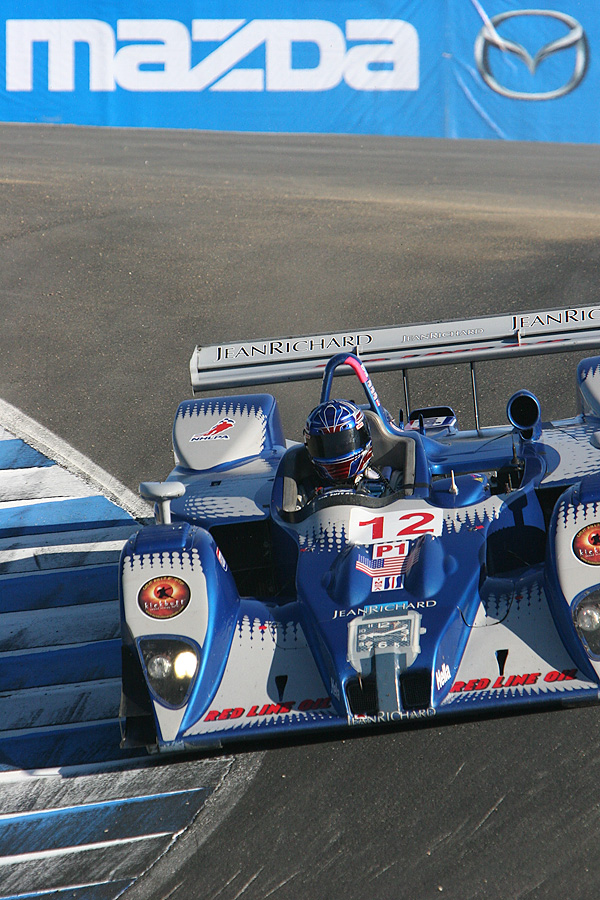
Autocon Motorsport's EX257 in 2006.

Following the dismal performance of Intersport's hybrid B01/60, the car was retired for 2005. This left only the two-car Dyson team in the American Le Mans Series, and RML in the Le Mans Endurance Series. However, RML had made extensive modifications to their car during the off-season, including the addition of a Judd XV675 V8 similar to Intersport's modification, leading to the new car being renamed the MG-Lola EX264. These modifications also meant that the car had been transferred to the LMP2 class, while Dyson's unmodified cars remained in LMP1. Dyson once again suffered against the R8s, although it did manage to take two wins over the season, coming second in the LMP1 championship. In Europe, RML saw better performance against their LMP2 competition, including their first class victory at Istanbul Park, with the team finishing second in the LMP2 championship behind Chamberlain-Synergy Motorsport. However, the MG's greatest success came at Le Mans. Not only did RML manage to score the car's first finish in the race, they also took the LMP2 class victory by a mere four laps ahead of a pair of Paul Belmondo Racing Courage C65's.

For 2006, Dyson Racing decided that the old EX257 was no longer competitive, and purchased newer Lola B06/10s. The two former Dyson EX257s were sold to two teams, Highcroft Racing and Autocon Motorsports, who competed on limited schedules in the American Le Mans Series. Highcroft scored the best result of the season, taking third place overall at Petit Le Mans. Meanwhile, Ray Mallock, Ltd. continued to campaign their EX264, this time using the old MG/AER turbocharged engine once again. Another single victory was achieved by the team at Donington Park, yet again leaving them with second place in the LMP2 championship. At Le Mans however, RML repeated their success. Besides taking another LMP2 class victory, they surpassed their previous record by 38 laps and finished in eighth place overall, a mere 37 laps behind the overall winning Audi R10.

2007 would be the last year the EX257 ever raced. The final original car still in competition, Autocon Motorsport's entry, began the 2007 American Le Mans Series season. However, following three rounds of racing, the team decided to switch to a newer Creation CA06/H after the Grand Prix of Long Beach.

== Chassis history ==
The following is a list of the owners of each EX257 or B01/60 chassis. Intersport's #HU-01 and RML's #HU-03 were the chassis modified to fit a Judd engine. #HU-05 was planned but never built.

#HU-01:

- MG Sport & Racing, Ltd. (2001)
- Intersport Racing (2002–2004)

#HU-02:

- MG Sport & Racing, Ltd. (2001–2002)
- Mike Newton / Ray Mallock Ltd. (2003–2011)

#HU-03:

- MG Sport & Racing, Ltd. (2001–2002)
- Chamberlain Engineering (2003)
- Intersport Racing (2003, under lease)
- Mike Newton (2007 - 2011)
- [For sale at Ascott Collection] (2020)

#HU-04:

- KnightHawk Racing (2002)
- Dyson Racing (2003–2005)
- Autocon Motorsports (2006–2007)

#HU-06:

- Dyson Racing (2002–2005)
- Highcroft Racing (2006)
