= Chevrolet Corvette C5-R =

Grand tourer racing car

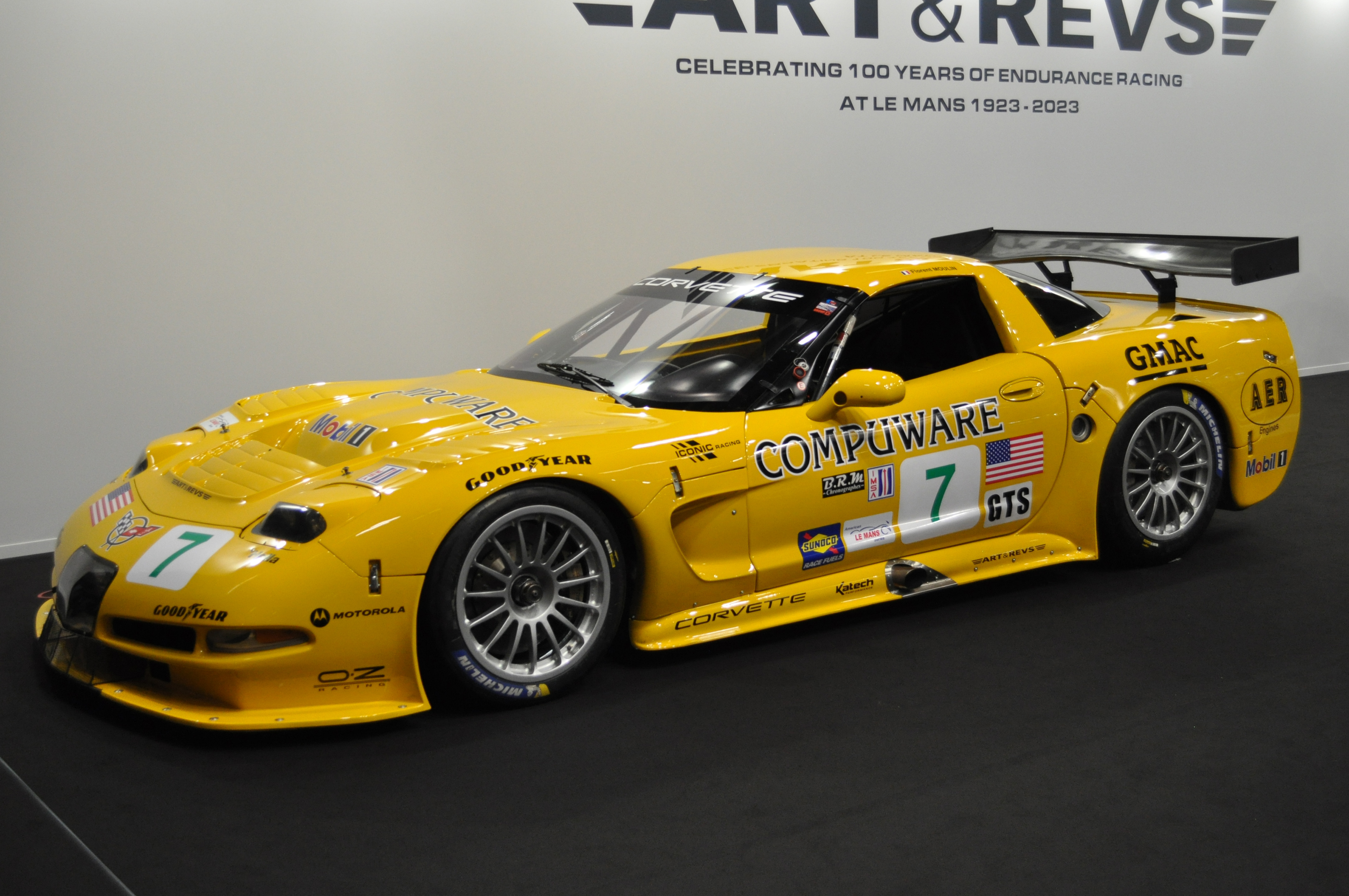
- A Chevrolet Corvette C5-R at the 2023 Rétromobile, Paris, France.
- Category: GT (FIA GT); GTS/GT1 (ALMS); GTO (Grand-Am)
- Constructor: Chevrolet (Pratt Miller)
- Designer: John Cafaro
- Production: Corvette C5
- Successor: Chevrolet Corvette C6.R

Technical specifications
- Chassis: Steel monocoque
- Suspension (front): Double wishbone, fabricated steel upper and lower control arms, coil over adjustable shock absorbers
- Suspension (rear): Double wishbone, fabricated steel upper and lower control arms, coil over adjustable shock absorbers
- Length: 182.8 in (4,643.1 mm)
- Width: 78.7 in (1,999.0 mm)
- Height: 45.8 in (1,163.3 mm)
- Axle track: Front: 74.7 in (1,897.4 mm); Rear: 76.1 in (1,932.9 mm)
- Wheelbase: 104.7 in (2,659.4 mm)
- Engine: Katech LS1.R 5,997 cc (366.0 cu in) (1999); 6,980 cc (425.9 cu in) (2000-2004), V8, 90° Naturally aspirated, front engined, longitudinally mounted
- Transmission: 5 speed manual (1999-2002); 6 speed manual (2002-2003); Xtrac 6 speed sequential (2004)
- Power: 610 hp (455 kW) @ 6200 RPM; 570 ft⋅lbf (773 N⋅m) @ 5600 RPM
- Weight: 2,815 lb (1,276.9 kg)
- Fuel: Elf Racing Fuel
- Lubricants: Mobil 1
- Brakes: AP Racing Carbon ceramic Front: 15 in (381.0 mm); Rear: 14 in (355.6 mm)
- Tires: 1999-2003: Goodyear; 2004: Michelin; Front: 25x12-18 Rear: 28x14-18

Competition history
- Notable entrants: (United States) Corvette Racing
- Notable drivers: (United States) Chris Kneifel (United States) John Paul Jr. (Canada) Ron Fellows (United Kingdom) Justin Bell (United States) Dale Earnhardt (United States) Dale Earnhardt Jr. (United Kingdom) Andy Pilgrim (France) Franck Fréon (United Kingdom) Oliver Gavin (United States) Johnny O'Connell (Italy) Max Papis (Monaco) Olivier Beretta (Denmark) Jan Magnussen
- Debut: 1999 Rolex 24 at Daytona
- First win: 2000 Grand Prix of Texas
- Last win: 2004 Monterey Sports Car Championships*
- Last event: 2004 Monterey Sports Car Championships*; *With factory support, privateers continued using the C5-R after the introduction of the C6.R
Races	Wins	Podiums	Poles
55	31	50	24
- Teams' Championships: 4
- Constructors' Championships: 4
- Drivers' Championships: 3

The Chevrolet Corvette C5-R is a grand touring racing car built by Pratt Miller and Chevrolet for competition in endurance racing. The car is based on the C5 generation of the Chevrolet Corvette sports car, yet is designed purely for motorsports use. It became one of the most successful cars in GT categories, with wins at the 24 Hours of Daytona, 12 Hours of Sebring, and 24 Hours of Le Mans, as well as championships in the American Le Mans Series. The Corvette C5-Rs debuted in 1999 and continues to be raced to this day in vintage racing events, although the C5-R was effectively replaced by the Corvette C6.R in 2005.

== Development ==
The Corvette C5-R was part of a plan by General Motors and their Chevrolet brand to create a factory team to participate in grand touring races not only in North America, but also elsewhere in the world, most notably at the 24 Hours of Le Mans. GM had previously been against approving factory support for Corvette racing programs, although the IMSA GT Championship's Corvette GTPs had seen some support until they ended competition in 1989. With the fifth generation Corvette however, GM chose to show the performance capabilities of the new car by using a more production-based racing car instead of the "in-name-only" Corvette GTP. Their intentions were to take on Dodge and Porsche, who were already running in the category at the time.

General Motors chose the Pratt Miller group of Michigan to build and develop the new racing cars, as well as to organize the racing team in preparation for a debut in 1999. Riley & Scott also assisted in the project, running a second team for a year. Since regulations in place at the time limited the team to using elements of production Corvettes, Pratt Miller and GM used heavily modified road car mules to test out the engine and other equipment that the racing cars were to use.

Later, the actual race chassis were built, sharing only basic key structural elements with the road cars. A firewall was placed immediately behind the driver's seat in the cockpit, eliminating any rear visibility inside the car. A large diffuser and wing were added to the rear, while a splitter and vents on the hood were added to the front. The front headlights were also replaced with protruding permanent units in place of the pop-up headlights on the road car.

The C5-R initially used a 366 ci (6.0 liter) V8 engine based on the road car's LS1. This was replaced with a larger 427 ci (7.0 liter) engine several months later during the 1999 season, and became the standard engine for the C5-R for the rest of its career. Katech Engine Development constructed the C5-Rs engines, although they retained elements of the production LS1 units.

Eleven C5-R chassis were built by Pratt Miller between 1998 and 2004, with ten being used directly by Corvette Racing and one built purely for privateer use. A twelfth car C5-R frame was built, but served merely as a test mule for the C6.R.

=== Modifications ===
As the C5-Rs competed over the years, numerous modifications were carried out in an attempt to improve the C5-R's capabilities against stronger competitors. Among the modifications were changes to the bodywork's aerodynamics in an attempt to increase downforce. The hood design was changed during the 1999 season to replace the small slat vents with a large open gap allowing air to exit more freely from the front grille. The third and fourth chassis built during 2000 were actually different from the initial two, due to being built three inches wider to improve cornering grip.

Later modifications included some technology developed on the C6.R, including air conditioning systems for driver comfort and a rear view camera on the bumper and monitor in the cockpit to overcome the lack of a rear window.

== Racing history ==
=== Corvette Racing ===
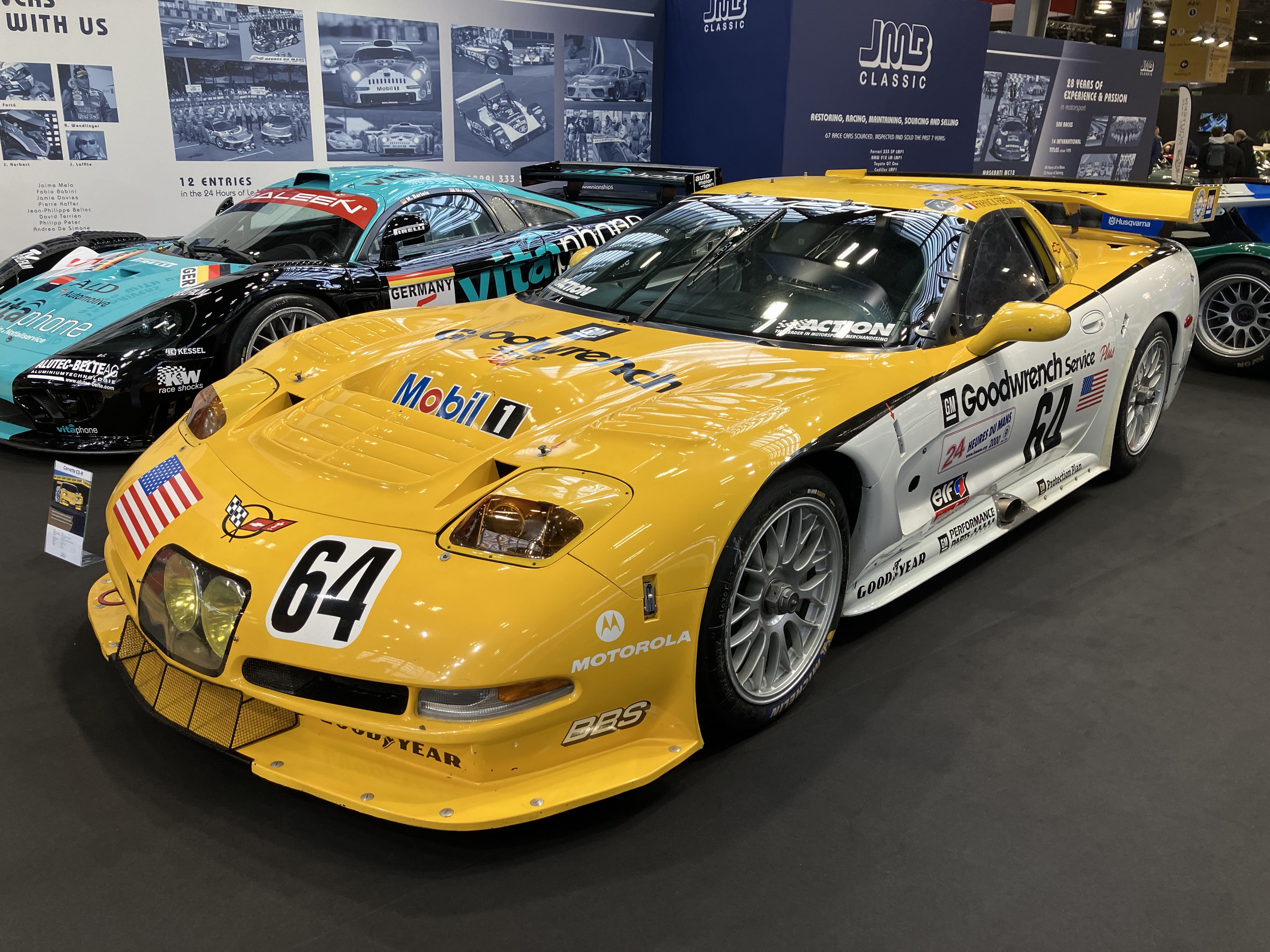
1999 Corvette Racing Pratt Miller C5-R that ran at the 2000 24 Hours of Le Mans

With two cars completed, Corvette Racing entered the 1999 24 Hours of Daytona for the United States Road Racing Championship. The Corvette C5-R of Canadian Ron Fellows and Americans Chris Kneifel and John Paul Jr. managed to finish the endurance event in 18th overall, 34 laps behind the class-winning Porsche. After failures at the 12 Hours of Sebring, Riley & Scott ran a few more rounds of the American Le Mans Series to finish off the year. A lone C5-R finished second in class behind a factory Dodge Viper at Sears Point, and again at Laguna Seca.

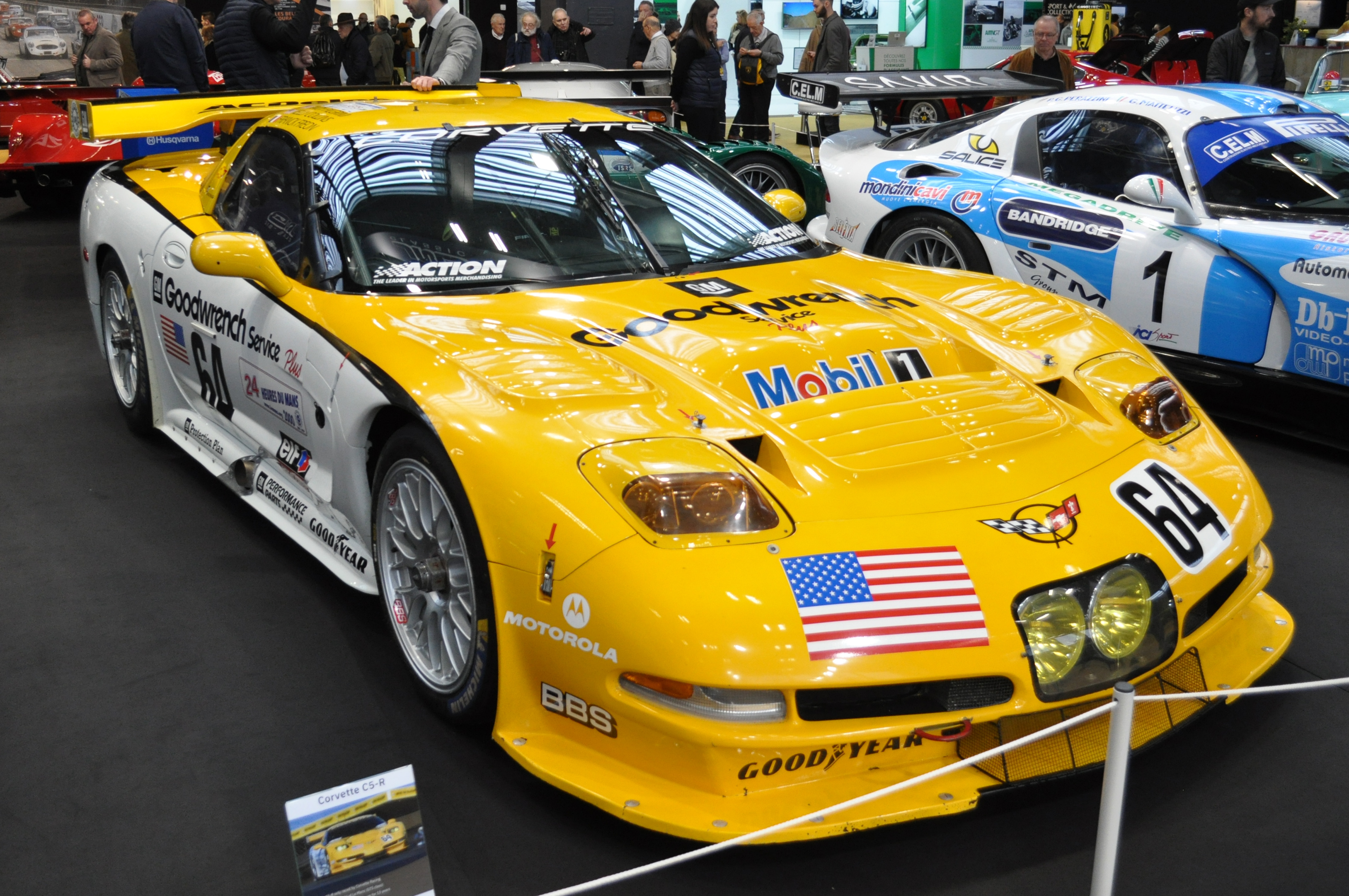
Corvette Racing C5-R at the 2023 Rétromobile exhibition

In 2000, Pratt Miller took over as the sole Corvette team, once again starting the season at Daytona. The Corvette of Fellows and Kneifel, now joined by Brit Justin Bell, greatly improved on their previous result by finishing in second place overall, a minute behind a factory Viper and easily outperforming various prototypes. However the team was not able to match the performance of the Vipers at Sebring, nor at their debut at Le Mans. The team rebounded though, as they earned their first class victories upon returning to the ALMS. The Corvette team managed to upset the Viper squad at Texas as well as the Petit Le Mans. Even though the C5-Rs ran only a partial season, the team earned third place in the GTS class championship.

2001 once again saw improvement at the opening of the season at Daytona. The C5-Rs outlasted the prototypes in the field and earned themselves the overall race victory. The race also saw the first drives by Dale Earnhardt and Earnhardt Jr. in both the 24 Hours and the Corvette C5-R, with their car finishing fourth overall. Feeling that the C5-R was a capable winner anywhere, Pratt Miller ran their first full season of the ALMS and earned six class victories, including their second at the Petit Le Mans. The C5-R also took its first victory at Le Mans, finishing eighth overall and 34 laps ahead of the closest competitor in their class.

Corvette Racing did not return to the 24 Hours of Daytona in 2002 due to rule changes in that event's championship, but they did continue their run in the American Le Mans Series. Corvette won nine out of the ten events, including their first class victory at the 12 Hours of Sebring. Their only loss came to the new Prodrive Ferrari team. Corvette secured their second win at Le Mans in 2002 as well.

2003 saw the first challenge to Corvette Racing's two years of dominance in their class. Prodrive chose to enter their Ferrari 550 GTS' in the full ALMS season as well, and although they were not strong early in the season, they managed to win the last four events of the season, including Petit Le Mans. Corvette Racing was however able to secure their third championship by a mere four points over the Prodrive team. The Ferraris would strike another blow though as they managed to end Corvette Racing's Le Mans streak, an event in which Corvette Racing celebrated the 50th anniversary of the Corvette.

Prodrive did not return to the American Le Mans Series for 2004, allowing Corvette to sweep the entire season and earn their fourth straight championship. Although Prodrive did compete at Le Mans, Corvette Racing was able to avenge their loss and add their third class victory at the event. This season was the final one for the C5-R under the Corvette Racing banner. The development of the C6 generation Corvette for 2005 led to an all-new race car, termed the Corvette C6.R, which the factory team used at the beginning of the 2005 season.

In total, Corvette Racing's C5-Rs would earn 31 class victories in the American Le Mans Series, three class wins at Le Mans, and one overall victory at Daytona.

=== Privateer teams ===
Initially, Corvette C5-Rs were built exclusively for the factory Corvette Racing team. It was not until 2001 that Pratt Miller would enter discussions with teams looking to purchase their own C5-Rs. The British Atomic Kitten Racing squad initially planned to purchase two brand new cars in 2001, but were unable to come to a deal. It was not until 2003 that the first C5-R was sold to an outside team.

==== Selleslagh Racing Team ====
The first C5-R customer was Belgian Patrick Selleslagh, who ran the Selleslagh Racing Team (SRT) in the Belcar championship. The car earned a season's best finish of second place at one of the series' events at Spa. The team also entered the Spa 24 Hours later that year as part of the FIA GT Championship, and managed to finish in 18th place overall.

2004 saw a similar result, with a best finish of second once again at a Spa round, as well as a couple of thirds. 2005 however would see the car take control of the Belcar series, as SRT won the opening round at Zolder. SRT went on to win four more events that season, including the 24 Hours of Zolder, and won the overall BelCar championship. An eighth place was also earned at the Spa 24 Hours.

At the end of 2005, SRT bought a former factory C5-R to complement their existing car. Both entered in the French FFSA GT Championship the next season. SRT managed a season best of second at Nogaro. 2007 saw only one C5-R entered in FFSA GT, earning five third-place finishes. The team's second C5-R would run in the FIA GT Championship's Citation Cup for amateur drivers, winning three races for that category, as well as finishing tenth overall at the Spa 24 Hours.

==== Pacific Coast Motorsports ====
American Tom Figge purchased the second customer C5-R in 2004, although this chassis was not a new car but instead a former factory car. Plans were made to use the car in the 2005 American Le Mans Series season for his Pacific Coast Motorsports squad. Although they were not expected to compete with the factory Corvette Racing team, they struggled against other privateers like ACEMCO Motorsports' Saleen S7-R. The team finished on their class podium only once in seven races before eventually deciding to abandon the series.

==== GLPK-Carsport ====
For the Corvette C5-R's first full entry in the FIA GT Championship, the Belgian-Dutch GLPK-Carsport team purchased another former factory chassis. The team earned two victories in their debut season, at Imola and Zhuhai, as well as a fourth-place finish at the Spa 24 Hours, although this result was later taken away due to disqualification. The two victories aided the team in finishing the season fourth in the teams championship, the highest placed team running only a one car entry.

For 2006, the team chose to move to the Belcar series while their brand new C6.R concentrated on FIA GT. The team won on their debut to the series. In 2007, the Dutch Carsport Holland half of the team separated, leaving PK-Carsport to continue on their own with the C5-R, choosing to return to FIA GT. The team had one of their best finish of the season at the Spa 24 Hours, once again finishing in third place but only three laps behind the winners.

==== PSI Experience ====
Following the departure of Pacific Coast Motorsports from the American Le Mans Series, their car was offered for sale. The Belgian PSI Experience team purchased this car as well as a C6.R for use in 2006, entering both in the FFSA GT Championship. The team's C5-R earned a victory at Lédenon, with French singer David Hallyday part of the driving squad. PSI also entered the Spa 24 Hours, finishing in eleventh overall.

PSI remained in FFSA GT for 2007, once again earning a race victory, this time at Nogaro. The C5-R was also entered in a few rounds of the FIA GT Championship as part of the Citation Cup.

==== Luc Alphand Aventures ====
One of the last C5-Rs sold, an ex-factory chassis was bought by French Olympian Luc Alphand for use in the Le Mans Series in 2006. The car earned two second-place finishes and a third in the five race season, enough to finish third in the championship standings. The team also entered the 24 Hours of Le Mans, finishing third in class behind a factory Corvette C6.R and Aston Martin DBR9.

2007 brought a new C6.R to the team, and both cars were campaigned in the Le Mans Series, but added the FFSA GT Championship to their season. Three second-place finishes were earned in FFSA GT, while the Le Mans Series entries earned only two third-place finishes. The car was entered at Le Mans, finishing 24th.
