= Clint Field =

American racing driver (born 1983)

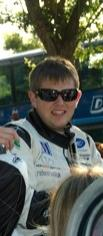
- Field in 2006
- Nationality: (United States) American
- Born: Clinton Richard Field; June 16, 1983 (age 43) Marion, Ohio, U.S.
- Relatives: Jon Field (father)

American Le Mans Series career
- Categorisation: FIA Silver (until 2018); FIA Bronze (2019)
- Years active: 2002–2011
- Teams: Intersport Racing
- Starts: 87
- Wins: 16
- Podiums: 45
- Poles: 13
- Fastest laps: 5
- Best finish: 1st in 2005 (LMP2)

Previous series
- 2000 2001–2002, 2006 2004 2010: BMG Motorola Cup; Rolex Sports Car Series; Le Mans Endurance Series; Intercontinental Le Mans Cup

Championship titles
- 2005: American Le Mans Series - LMP2

Clinton Richard Field (born June 16, 1983) is an American former racing driver who last competed in 2011. Racing for Intersport Racing, a team founded by his father Jon, he won the 2004 24 Hours of Le Mans, the 2005 American Le Mans Series and the 2006 12 Hours of Sebring in LMP2.

== Racing record ==
=== Career summary ===
Season	Series	Team	Races	Wins	Poles	F/Laps	Podiums	Points	Position
2000	BMG Motorola Cup - GS	Briggs Racing	1	0	0	0	0	12	99th
2001	Grand American Road Racing Championship - SRP	Intersport Racing	7	0	0	0	1	229	10th
2002	Rolex Sports Car Series - SRP	Intersport Racing	3	0	0	0	1	79	18th
2002	American Le Mans Series - LMP675	Intersport Racing	3	1	0	0	1	59	15th
2002	American Le Mans Series - LMP900	Intersport Racing	6	0	0	0	0	88	15th
2003	American Le Mans Series - LMP900	Intersport Racing	9	0	0	0	0	46	12th
2003	1000 km of Le Mans - LMP900	Intersport Racing	1	0	0	0	0	N/A	DNF
2004	Le Mans Endurance Series - LMP2	Intersport Racing	1	0	0	0	0	0	NC
2004	24 Hours of Le Mans - LMP2	Intersport Racing	1	1	0	0	1	N/A	**1st**
2004	American Le Mans Series - LMP2	Intersport Racing	9	6	4	2	6	129	**3rd**
2005	American Le Mans Series - LMP2	Intersport Racing	9	5	4	3	5	133	**1st**
2006	24 Hours of Le Mans - LMP2	Intersport Racing	1	0	0	0	0	N/A	4th
2006	American Le Mans Series - LMP2	Intersport Racing	10	3	0	0	8	166	**2nd**
2006	Rolex Sports Car Series - Daytona Prototype	Synergy Racing	1	0	0	0	0	0	NC
2007	American Le Mans Series - LMP1	Intersport Racing	12	0	0	0	5	95	4th
2008	American Le Mans Series - LMP1	Intersport Racing	10	1	0	0	6	103	4th
2009	American Le Mans Series - LMP1	Intersport Racing	10	0	0	0	6	116	3rd
2010	American Le Mans Series - LMP	Intersport Racing	5	0	0	0	1	59	10th
2010	Intercontinental Le Mans Cup - LMP1	Intersport Racing	1	0	0	0	0	0	NC
2011	American Le Mans Series - LMPC	Intersport Racing	1	0	0	0	1	31	13th

=== Complete American Le Mans Series results ===
(key) (Races in bold indicate pole position; results in italics indicate fastest lap)

Year	Team	Class	Make	Engine	1	2	3	4	5	6	7	8	9	10	11	12	Pos.	Points	Ref
2002	Intersport Racing	LMP900	Lola B2K/10B	Judd GV4 4.0 L V10	SEB	SON; 5		ELK; 4			MOS; 7	LGA; 7	MIA; 9	PET; 11			15th	88	
2002	Intersport Racing	LMP675	MG-Lola EX257	MG (AER) XP20 2.0 L Turbo I4			**MDO**; 4		**WAS**; 1	TRO; 4							15th	59	
2003	Intersport Racing	LMP900	Lola B2K/10B	Judd GV4 4.0 L V10	SEB; DSQ	ATL; 5	SON; 6	TRO; 6	MOS; 5	ELK; 5	LGA; 5	MIA; 4	PET; 6				12th	46	
2004	Intersport Racing	LMP2	Lola B2K/40	Judd KV675 3.4 L V8	SEB; 3	MDO; 1	LRP; 5	**SON**; 1	**POR**; 1	**MOS**; 1	ELK; DSQ	**PET**; 1	LGA; 1				3rd	129	
2005	Intersport Racing	LMP2	Lola B2K/40	Judd KV675 3.4 L V8	SEB; 4												1st	133	
2005	Intersport Racing	LMP2	Lola B05/40	AER P07 2.0 L Turbo I4		ATL; 1	MDO; 2	LRP	SON; 1	POR; 1	ELK; 3	MOS; 1	PET; 1	LGA; 5			1st	133	
2006	Intersport Racing	LMP2	Lola B05/40	AER P07 2.0 L Turbo I4	SEB; 1	TEX; 1	MDO; 3	LRP	UTA; 2	POR; 1	ELK; 3	MOS; 3	PET; 3	LGA; 3			2nd	166	
2007	Intersport Racing	LMP1	Creation CA06/H	Judd GV5 S2 5.0 L V10	SEB; 3	STP; 3	LBH; 3	TEX; 3	UTA; 3	LRP; 2	MDO; 5	ELK; 5	MOS; 4				4th	95	
2007	Intersport Racing	LMP1	Lola B06/10	AER P32T 4.0 L Turbo V8										DET; 4	PET; 7	LGA; 7	4th	95	
2008	Intersport Racing	LMP1	Lola B06/10	AER P32C 4.0 L Turbo V8 (E85 ethanol)	SEB; 3	STP; 3	LBH; 4	UTA; 2	LRP; 2	MDO; 5	ELK; 3	MOS; 3	DET; 1	PET; 6	LGA		4th	103	
2009	Intersport Racing	LMP1	Lola B06/10	AER P32C 4.0 L Turbo V8	SEB; 8	STP; 2	LBH; 3	UTA; 3	LRP; 5	MDO; 3	ELK; 3	MOS; 3	PET; 7	LGA; 5			3rd	116	
2010	Intersport Racing	LMP	Lola B06/10	AER P32T 4.0 L Turbo V8	SEB	LBH; 7	LGA; 6	UTA; 7	LRP; 9	MDO; 4	ELK; 6	MOS; 6	PET; 4				10th	59	
2011	Intersport Racing	LMPC	Oreca FLM09	Chevrolet LS3 6.2 L V8	SEB	LBH	LRP	MOS	MDO; 2	ELK	BAL	LGA	PET				13th	31	

^{†} Did not finish the race but was classified as his car completed more than 70% of the overall winner's race distance.

=== Complete Le Mans Series results ===
(key) (Races in bold indicate pole position; results in italics indicate fastest lap)

Year	Entrant	Class	Chassis	Engine	1	2	3	4	Rank	Points
2004	Intersport Racing	LMP2	Lola B2K/40	Judd KV675 3.4 L V8	MNZ; Ret	NÜR	SIL	SPA	NC	0

=== Complete 24 Hours of Le Mans results ===
Year	Team	Co-Drivers	Car	Class	Laps	Pos.	Class Pos.
2004	(United States) Intersport Racing	(United States) William Binnie (United States) Rick Sutherland	Lola B2K/40-AER	LMP2	278	25th	**1st**
2006	(United States) Intersport Racing	(United States) Duncan Dayton (United States) Liz Halliday	Lola B05/40-Judd	LMP2	297	19th	4th
