= 2005 American Le Mans Series =

35th season of the racing series organized by IMSA

Seasons
- ← 2004 2006 →

The 2005 American Le Mans Series season was the 35th season for the IMSA GT Championship, with it being the seventh under the American Le Mans Series moniker. It was a series for Le Mans Prototypes (LMP) and Grand Touring (GT) race cars divided into 4 classes: LMP1, LMP2, GT1, and GT2. It began March 19, 2005 and ended October 16, 2005 after 10 races.

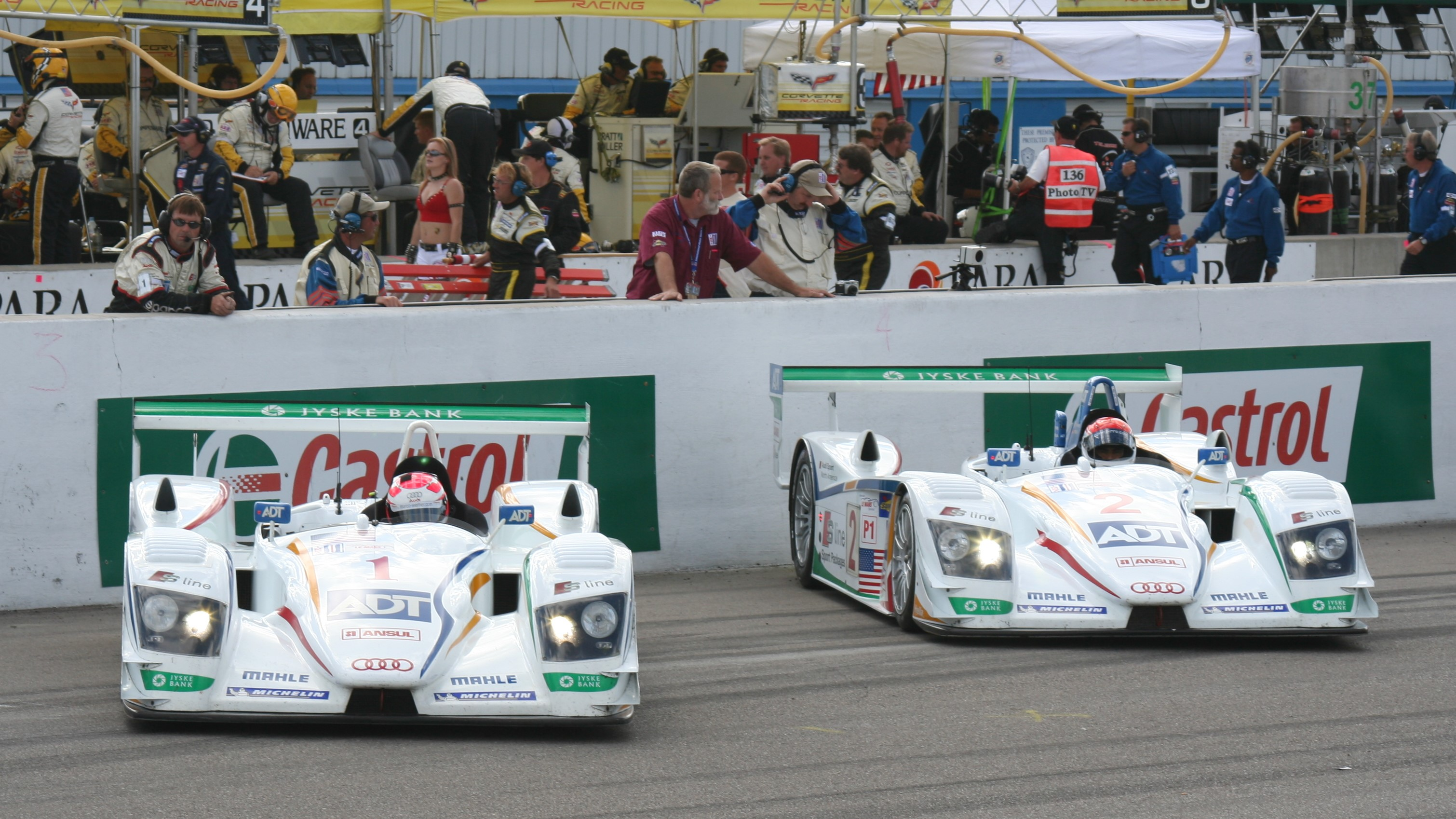
Champion Racing won the LMP1 championship

== Schedule ==
The schedule change from 2004 to 2005 was minimal, with only one event being added to the existing schedule. The Grand Prix of Atlanta returned once more, once again shortly after the 12 Hours of Sebring.

Rnd	Race	Length	Circuit	Location	Date
1	(United States) Mobil 1 12 Hours of Sebring	12 Hours	Sebring Raceway	Sebring, Florida	March 19
2	(United States) Sportsbook.com Grand Prix of Atlanta	2 Hours 45 Minutes	Road Atlanta	Braselton, Georgia	April 17
3	(United States) American Le Mans at Mid-Ohio	2 Hours 45 Minutes	Mid-Ohio	Lexington, Ohio	May 22
4	(United States) New England Grand Prix	2 Hours 45 Minutes	Lime Rock Park	Lakeville, Connecticut	July 4
5	(United States) Infineon Grand Prix of Sonoma	2 Hours 45 Minutes	Infineon Raceway	Sonoma, California	July 17
6	(United States) Portland Grand Prix	2 Hours 45 Minutes	Portland International Raceway	Portland, Oregon	July 30
7	(United States) Generac 500 at Road America	2 Hours 45 Minutes	Road America	Elkhart Lake, Wisconsin	August 21
8	(Canada) Grand Prix of Mosport	2 Hours 45 Minutes	Mosport	Bowmanville, Ontario	September 4
9	(United States) Petit Le Mans	1000 Miles or 10 Hours	Road Atlanta	Braselton, Georgia	October 1
10	(United States) Monterey Sports Car Championships	4 Hours	Mazda Raceway Laguna Seca	Monterey, California	October 16

== Entry list ==
=== Le Mans Prototype 1 (LMP1) ===
Team	Chassis	Engine	Tyre	No.	Drivers	Rnds.
(United States) ADT/Champion Racing	Audi R8	Audi 3.6 L Turbo V8	M	1	(Finland) J.J. Lehto	All
(United States) ADT/Champion Racing	Audi R8	Audi 3.6 L Turbo V8	M	1	(Germany) Marco Werner	All
(United States) ADT/Champion Racing	Audi R8	Audi 3.6 L Turbo V8	M	1	(Denmark) Tom Kristensen	1
(United States) ADT/Champion Racing	Audi R8	Audi 3.6 L Turbo V8	M	2	(Italy) Emanuele Pirro	All
(United States) ADT/Champion Racing	Audi R8	Audi 3.6 L Turbo V8	M	2	(Germany) Frank Biela	All
(United States) ADT/Champion Racing	Audi R8	Audi 3.6 L Turbo V8	M	2	(United Kingdom) Allan McNish	1
(United States) Autocon Motorsports	Riley & Scott Mk III C	Élan 6L8 6.0 L V8	D	12	(United States) Michael Lewis	1, 5–7, 9–10
(United States) Autocon Motorsports	Riley & Scott Mk III C	Élan 6L8 6.0 L V8	D	12	(United States) Bryan Willman	1, 5–7, 9–10
(United States) Autocon Motorsports	Riley & Scott Mk III C	Élan 6L8 6.0 L V8	D	12	(United States) Tomy Drissi	1
(United Kingdom) Zytek Engineering	Zytek 04S	Zytek ZG348 3.4 L V8	M	15	(United Kingdom) Tom Chilton	3, 9–10
(United Kingdom) Zytek Engineering	Zytek 04S	Zytek ZG348 3.4 L V8	M	15	(Japan) Hayanari Shimoda	3, 9–10
(United States) Dyson Racing Team	MG-Lola EX257	MG (AER) XP20 2.0 L Turbo I4	M	16	(United Kingdom) James Weaver	All
(United States) Dyson Racing Team	MG-Lola EX257	MG (AER) XP20 2.0 L Turbo I4	M	16	(United States) Butch Leitzinger	All
(United States) Dyson Racing Team	MG-Lola EX257	MG (AER) XP20 2.0 L Turbo I4	M	16	(United Kingdom) Andy Wallace	1, 9
(United States) Dyson Racing Team	MG-Lola EX257	MG (AER) XP20 2.0 L Turbo I4	M	20	(United States) Chris Dyson	All
(United States) Dyson Racing Team	MG-Lola EX257	MG (AER) XP20 2.0 L Turbo I4	M	20	(United Kingdom) Guy Smith	1, 9
(United States) Dyson Racing Team	MG-Lola EX257	MG (AER) XP20 2.0 L Turbo I4	M	20	(United Kingdom) Andy Wallace	2–8, 10
(United Kingdom) Rollcentre Racing	Dallara SP1	Nissan 3.0 L Turbo V8	M	88	(Portugal) Joăo Barbosa	1
(United Kingdom) Rollcentre Racing	Dallara SP1	Nissan 3.0 L Turbo V8	M	88	(Belgium) Didier Theys	1
(United Kingdom) Rollcentre Racing	Dallara SP1	Nissan 3.0 L Turbo V8	M	88	(Germany) Michael Krumm	1

=== Le Mans Prototype 2 (LMP2) ===
Team	Chassis	Engine	Tyre	No.	Drivers	Rnds.
(United States) Penske Racing	Porsche RS Spyder	Porsche MR6 3.4 L V8	M	6	(Germany) Lucas Luhr	10
(United States) Penske Racing	Porsche RS Spyder	Porsche MR6 3.4 L V8	M	6	(Germany) Sascha Maassen	10
(United States) BAT Competition	Lola B2K/40	Nissan (AER) VQL 3.0 L V6	Y	7	(United States) Bob Woodman	9
(United States) BAT Competition	Lola B2K/40	Nissan (AER) VQL 3.0 L V6	Y	7	(France) Georges Forgeois	9
(United States) BAT Competition	Lola B2K/40	Nissan (AER) VQL 3.0 L V6	Y	7	(United States) Mike Johnson	9
(United States) B-K Motorsports	Courage C65	Mazda R20B 2.0 L 3-Rotor	G	8	(United States) Guy Cosmo	2–10
(United States) B-K Motorsports	Courage C65	Mazda R20B 2.0 L 3-Rotor	G	8	(United States) James Bach	2–10
(United States) B-K Motorsports	Courage C65	Mazda R20B 2.0 L 3-Rotor	G	8	(United States) Elliot Forbes-Robinson	9
(United States) Miracle Motorsports	Courage C65	AER P07 2.0 L Turbo I4	K	10	(United States) Jeff Bucknum	All
(United States) Miracle Motorsports	Courage C65	AER P07 2.0 L Turbo I4	K	10	(United States) Chris McMurry	All
(United States) Miracle Motorsports	Courage C65	AER P07 2.0 L Turbo I4	K	10	(United Kingdom) Ian James	1
(United States) Miracle Motorsports	Courage C65	AER P07 2.0 L Turbo I4	K	10	(United States) John Macaluso	2
(United States) Miracle Motorsports	Courage C65	AER P07 2.0 L Turbo I4	K	10	(United States) James Gue	9–10
(United States) Binnie Motorsports	Lola B05/40	Nicholson-McLaren XB 3.3 L V8	P	15 41	(United States) William Binnie	1, 9
(United States) Binnie Motorsports	Lola B05/40	Nicholson-McLaren XB 3.3 L V8	P	15 41	(Canada) Robert Julien	1
(United States) Binnie Motorsports	Lola B05/40	Nicholson-McLaren XB 3.3 L V8	P	15 41	(United Kingdom) Adam Sharpe	1
(United States) Binnie Motorsports	Lola B05/40	Nicholson-McLaren XB 3.3 L V8	P	15 41	(United Kingdom) Alan Timpany	9
(United States) Binnie Motorsports	Lola B05/40	Nicholson-McLaren XB 3.3 L V8	P	15 41	(United Kingdom) Sam Hancock	9
(United States) Van der Steur Racing	Lola B2K/40	Nissan (AER) VQL 3.0 L V6	D	19	(United Kingdom) Ben Devlin	2–4, 7–10
(United States) Van der Steur Racing	Lola B2K/40	Nissan (AER) VQL 3.0 L V6	D	19	(United States) Gunnar van der Steur	2–4, 7–10
(United States) Van der Steur Racing	Lola B2K/40	Nissan (AER) VQL 3.0 L V6	D	19	(United States) Eric van der Steur	2–3, 8–9
(Germany) Kruse Motorsport	Courage C65	Judd XV675 3.4 L V8	P	27	(Switzerland) Harold Primat	1
(Germany) Kruse Motorsport	Courage C65	Judd XV675 3.4 L V8	P	27	(United Kingdom) Phillip Bennett	1
(Germany) Kruse Motorsport	Courage C65	Judd XV675 3.4 L V8	P	27	(United Kingdom) Ian Mitchell	1
(Switzerland) Horag-Lista Racing	Lola B05/40	Nissan (AER) VQL 3.0 L V6	D	27	(Belgium) Eric van de Poele	9
(Switzerland) Horag-Lista Racing	Lola B05/40	Nissan (AER) VQL 3.0 L V6	D	27	(Belgium) Didier Theys	9
(Switzerland) Horag-Lista Racing	Lola B05/40	Nissan (AER) VQL 3.0 L V6	D	27	(Sweden) Thed Björk	9
(United States) Intersport Racing	Lola B2K/40	Judd KV675 3.4 L V8	P	30	(United States) Clint Field	1
(United States) Intersport Racing	Lola B2K/40	Judd KV675 3.4 L V8	P	30	(United States) Liz Halliday	1
(United States) Intersport Racing	Lola B2K/40	Judd KV675 3.4 L V8	P	30	(United Kingdom) Gareth Ridpath	1
(United States) Intersport Racing	Lola B05/40	AER P07 2.0 L Turbo I4	G	37	(United States) Jon Field	1–3, 9–10
(United States) Intersport Racing	Lola B05/40	AER P07 2.0 L Turbo I4	G	37	(United Kingdom) Gregor Fisken	1, 6
(United States) Intersport Racing	Lola B05/40	AER P07 2.0 L Turbo I4	G	37	(United States) Duncan Dayton	1
(United States) Intersport Racing	Lola B05/40	AER P07 2.0 L Turbo I4	G	37	(United States) Clint Field	2–3, 5–10
(United States) Intersport Racing	Lola B05/40	AER P07 2.0 L Turbo I4	G	37	(United States) Liz Halliday	5, 7–10
(Germany) Barazi-Kruse Motorsport	Courage C65	AER P07 2.0 L Turbo I4	P	30	(Denmark) Juan Barazi	9
(Germany) Barazi-Kruse Motorsport	Courage C65	AER P07 2.0 L Turbo I4	P	30	(United Kingdom) Phillip Bennett	9
(Germany) Barazi-Kruse Motorsport	Courage C65	AER P07 2.0 L Turbo I4	P	30	(United States) Elton Julian	9

=== Grand Touring 1 (GT1) ===
Team	Chassis	Engine	Tyre	No.	Drivers	Rnds.
(United States) Corvette Racing	Chevrolet Corvette C6.R	Chevrolet LS7.R 7.0 L V8	M	3	(Canada) Ron Fellows	All
(United States) Corvette Racing	Chevrolet Corvette C6.R	Chevrolet LS7.R 7.0 L V8	M	3	(United States) Johnny O'Connell	All
(United States) Corvette Racing	Chevrolet Corvette C6.R	Chevrolet LS7.R 7.0 L V8	M	3	(Italy) Max Papis	1, 9
(United States) Corvette Racing	Chevrolet Corvette C6.R	Chevrolet LS7.R 7.0 L V8	M	4	(United Kingdom) Oliver Gavin	All
(United States) Corvette Racing	Chevrolet Corvette C6.R	Chevrolet LS7.R 7.0 L V8	M	4	(Monaco) Olivier Beretta	All
(United States) Corvette Racing	Chevrolet Corvette C6.R	Chevrolet LS7.R 7.0 L V8	M	4	(Denmark) Jan Magnussen	1, 9
(United States) Pacific Coast Motorsports	Chevrolet Corvette C5-R	Chevrolet LS1.R 7.0 L V8	Y	5	(United Kingdom) Ryan Dalziel	1–7
(United States) Pacific Coast Motorsports	Chevrolet Corvette C5-R	Chevrolet LS1.R 7.0 L V8	Y	5	(United States) Alex Figge	1–7
(United States) Pacific Coast Motorsports	Chevrolet Corvette C5-R	Chevrolet LS1.R 7.0 L V8	Y	5	(Canada) David Empringham	1
(Italy) Maserati Corse (United States) Risi Competizione	Maserati MC12	Maserati M144B/2 6.0 L V12	P	35	(Italy) Andrea Bertolini	1–5, 7–10
(Italy) Maserati Corse (United States) Risi Competizione	Maserati MC12	Maserati M144B/2 6.0 L V12	P	35	(Italy) Fabrizio de Simone	1–3, 5–10
(Italy) Maserati Corse (United States) Risi Competizione	Maserati MC12	Maserati M144B/2 6.0 L V12	P	35	(Italy) Fabio Babini	1, 4, 9
(Italy) Maserati Corse (United States) Risi Competizione	Maserati MC12	Maserati M144B/2 6.0 L V12	P	35	(Finland) Mika Salo	6
(United Kingdom) Aston Martin Racing	Aston Martin DBR9	Aston Martin AM04 6.0 L V12	M	57	(United Kingdom) Darren Turner	1, 9–10
(United Kingdom) Aston Martin Racing	Aston Martin DBR9	Aston Martin AM04 6.0 L V12	M	57	(Australia) David Brabham	1, 9–10
(United Kingdom) Aston Martin Racing	Aston Martin DBR9	Aston Martin AM04 6.0 L V12	M	57	(Monaco) Stéphane Ortelli	1
(United Kingdom) Aston Martin Racing	Aston Martin DBR9	Aston Martin AM04 6.0 L V12	M	57	(United Kingdom) Jonny Kane	9
(United Kingdom) Aston Martin Racing	Aston Martin DBR9	Aston Martin AM04 6.0 L V12	M	58	(Netherlands) Peter Kox	1, 9–10
(United Kingdom) Aston Martin Racing	Aston Martin DBR9	Aston Martin AM04 6.0 L V12	M	58	(Portugal) Pedro Lamy	1, 9–10
(United Kingdom) Aston Martin Racing	Aston Martin DBR9	Aston Martin AM04 6.0 L V12	M	58	(France) Stephane Sarrazin	1
(United Kingdom) Aston Martin Racing	Aston Martin DBR9	Aston Martin AM04 6.0 L V12	M	58	(Czech Republic) Tomáš Enge	9
(United States) ACEMCO Motorsports	Saleen S7-R	Ford Windsor 7.0 L V8	M	63	(United Kingdom) Johnny Mowlem	All
(United States) ACEMCO Motorsports	Saleen S7-R	Ford Windsor 7.0 L V8	M	63	(United States) Terry Borcheller	All
(United States) ACEMCO Motorsports	Saleen S7-R	Ford Windsor 7.0 L V8	M	63	(Germany) Ralf Kelleners	1, 9
(United States) Carsport America	Dodge Viper GTS-R	Dodge EWB 8.0 L V10	P	71	(United States) Tom Weickardt	All
(United States) Carsport America	Dodge Viper GTS-R	Dodge EWB 8.0 L V10	P	71	(Italy) Michele Rugolo	All
(United States) Carsport America	Dodge Viper GTS-R	Dodge EWB 8.0 L V10	P	71	(France) Jean-Philippe Belloc	1–2, 8–9
(United Kingdom) Graham Nash Motorsport	Saleen S7-R	Ford Windsor 7.0 L V8	P	83	(United Kingdom) Nigel Smith	1
(United Kingdom) Graham Nash Motorsport	Saleen S7-R	Ford Windsor 7.0 L V8	P	83	(United Kingdom) Ricky Cole	1
(United Kingdom) Graham Nash Motorsport	Saleen S7-R	Ford Windsor 7.0 L V8	P	83	(United States) Rick Sutherland	1
(France) Care Racing - Larbre	Ferrari 550-GTS Maranello	Ferrari F133 A 6.0 L V12	M	86	(France) Christophe Bouchut	1
(France) Care Racing - Larbre	Ferrari 550-GTS Maranello	Ferrari F133 A 6.0 L V12	M	86	(Italy) Fabrizio Gollin	1
(France) Care Racing - Larbre	Ferrari 550-GTS Maranello	Ferrari F133 A 6.0 L V12	M	86	(France) Sébastien Bourdais	1

=== Grand Touring 2 (GT2) ===
Team	Chassis	Engine	Tyre	No.	Drivers	Rnds.
(United States) Alex Job Racing	Porsche 996 GT3-RSR	Porsche 3.6 L Flat-6	M	23	(Germany) Timo Bernhard	All
(United States) Alex Job Racing	Porsche 996 GT3-RSR	Porsche 3.6 L Flat-6	M	23	(France) Romain Dumas	All
(United States) Alex Job Racing	Porsche 996 GT3-RSR	Porsche 3.6 L Flat-6	M	23	(Germany) Sascha Maassen	1
(United States) Alex Job Racing	Porsche 996 GT3-RSR	Porsche 3.6 L Flat-6	M	24	(United States) Ian Baas	All
(United States) Alex Job Racing	Porsche 996 GT3-RSR	Porsche 3.6 L Flat-6	M	24	(United States) Randy Pobst	1–5
(United States) Alex Job Racing	Porsche 996 GT3-RSR	Porsche 3.6 L Flat-6	M	24	(United States) Brian Cunningham	1
(United States) Alex Job Racing	Porsche 996 GT3-RSR	Porsche 3.6 L Flat-6	M	24	(United States) Darren Law	6–8, 10
(United States) Alex Job Racing	Porsche 996 GT3-RSR	Porsche 3.6 L Flat-6	M	24	(France) Emmanuel Collard	9
(United States) Alex Job Racing	Porsche 996 GT3-RSR	Porsche 3.6 L Flat-6	M	24	(Germany) Marcel Tiemann	9
(United States) White Lightning Racing (United States) Petersen Motorsports	Porsche 996 GT3-RSR	Porsche 3.6 L Flat-6	M	31	(Germany) Jörg Bergmeister	All
(United States) White Lightning Racing (United States) Petersen Motorsports	Porsche 996 GT3-RSR	Porsche 3.6 L Flat-6	M	31	(United States) Patrick Long	All
(United States) White Lightning Racing (United States) Petersen Motorsports	Porsche 996 GT3-RSR	Porsche 3.6 L Flat-6	M	31	(Germany) Lucas Lühr	1
(United States) White Lightning Racing (United States) Petersen Motorsports	Porsche 996 GT3-RSR	Porsche 3.6 L Flat-6	M	31	(United States) Craig Stanton	9*
(United States) ZIP Racing	Porsche 996 GT3-R	Porsche 3.6 L Flat-6	P	34	(United States) Spencer Pumpelly	1
(United States) ZIP Racing	Porsche 996 GT3-R	Porsche 3.6 L Flat-6	P	34	(United States) Andy Lally	1
(United States) ZIP Racing	Porsche 996 GT3-R	Porsche 3.6 L Flat-6	P	34	(United States) Steven Ivankovich	1
(United Kingdom) Team LNT - Magic	TVR Tuscan T400R	TVR Speed Six 4.0 L I6	D	40	(United Kingdom) Lawrence Tomlinson	1
(United Kingdom) Team LNT - Magic	TVR Tuscan T400R	TVR Speed Six 4.0 L I6	D	40	(United Kingdom) Jonny Kane	1
(United Kingdom) Team LNT - Magic	TVR Tuscan T400R	TVR Speed Six 4.0 L I6	D	40	(United Kingdom) Warren Hughes	1
(United Kingdom) Team LNT - Magic	TVR Tuscan T400R	TVR Speed Six 4.0 L I6	D	41	(United Kingdom) Richard Dean	1
(United Kingdom) Team LNT - Magic	TVR Tuscan T400R	TVR Speed Six 4.0 L I6	D	41	(United Kingdom) Patrick Pearce	1
(United Kingdom) Team LNT - Magic	TVR Tuscan T400R	TVR Speed Six 4.0 L I6	D	41	(United Kingdom) Marc Hynes	1
(United States) BAM!	Porsche 996 GT3-RSR	Porsche 3.6 L Flat-6	Y	43	(Canada) Tony Burgess	1–3
(United States) BAM!	Porsche 996 GT3-RSR	Porsche 3.6 L Flat-6	Y	43	(Germany) Mike Rockenfeller	1, 3–5, 7–10
(United States) BAM!	Porsche 996 GT3-RSR	Porsche 3.6 L Flat-6	Y	43	(Denmark) Martin Jensen	1, 6, 9
(United States) BAM!	Porsche 996 GT3-RSR	Porsche 3.6 L Flat-6	Y	43	(Germany) Sascha Maassen	2
(United States) BAM!	Porsche 996 GT3-RSR	Porsche 3.6 L Flat-6	Y	43	(Germany) Wolf Henzler	4–10
(United States) Flying Lizard Motorsports	Porsche 996 GT3-RSR	Porsche 3.6 L Flat-6	M	44	(United States) Lonnie Pechnik	All
(United States) Flying Lizard Motorsports	Porsche 996 GT3-RSR	Porsche 3.6 L Flat-6	M	44	(United States) Seth Neiman	All
(United States) Flying Lizard Motorsports	Porsche 996 GT3-RSR	Porsche 3.6 L Flat-6	M	44	(United States) David Murry	1, 8–9
(United States) Flying Lizard Motorsports	Porsche 996 GT3-RSR	Porsche 3.6 L Flat-6	M	45	(United States) Jon Fogarty	All
(United States) Flying Lizard Motorsports	Porsche 996 GT3-RSR	Porsche 3.6 L Flat-6	M	45	(United States) Johannes van Overbeek	All
(United States) Flying Lizard Motorsports	Porsche 996 GT3-RSR	Porsche 3.6 L Flat-6	M	45	(United States) Darren Law	1
(Netherlands) Spyker Squadron	Spyker C8 Spyder GT2-R	Audi (Mader) 3.8 L V8	D	47	(Netherlands) Tom Coronel	1
(Netherlands) Spyker Squadron	Spyker C8 Spyder GT2-R	Audi (Mader) 3.8 L V8	D	47	(Belgium) Marc Goossens	1
(Netherlands) Spyker Squadron	Spyker C8 Spyder GT2-R	Audi (Mader) 3.8 L V8	D	47	(Netherlands) Donny Crevels	1
(Netherlands) Spyker Squadron	Spyker C8 Spyder GT2-R	Audi (Mader) 3.8 L V8	D	48	(Netherlands) Peter Van Merksteijn	1
(Netherlands) Spyker Squadron	Spyker C8 Spyder GT2-R	Audi (Mader) 3.8 L V8	D	48	(Netherlands) Frans Munsterhuis	1
(Netherlands) Spyker Squadron	Spyker C8 Spyder GT2-R	Audi (Mader) 3.8 L V8	D	48	(United Kingdom) Marino Franchitti	1
(United States) Panoz Motor Sports	Panoz Esperante GT-LM	Ford (Elan) 5.0 L V8	P	50	(United Kingdom) Robin Liddell	All
(United States) Panoz Motor Sports	Panoz Esperante GT-LM	Ford (Elan) 5.0 L V8	P	50	(United States) Bill Auberlen	1–5, 7–10
(United States) Panoz Motor Sports	Panoz Esperante GT-LM	Ford (Elan) 5.0 L V8	P	50	(Italy) Emanuele Naspetti	1
(United States) Panoz Motor Sports	Panoz Esperante GT-LM	Ford (Elan) 5.0 L V8	P	50	(United Kingdom) Marino Franchitti	3
(United States) Panoz Motor Sports	Panoz Esperante GT-LM	Ford (Elan) 5.0 L V8	P	50	(United States) Bryan Sellers	6
(United States) Panoz Motor Sports	Panoz Esperante GT-LM	Ford (Elan) 5.0 L V8	P	50	(Canada) Scott Maxwell	9
(United States) Panoz Motor Sports	Panoz Esperante GT-LM	Ford (Elan) 5.0 L V8	P	51	(United States) Bryan Sellers	1–5, 7–10
(United States) Panoz Motor Sports	Panoz Esperante GT-LM	Ford (Elan) 5.0 L V8	P	51	(Canada) Scott Maxwell	1–3
(United States) Panoz Motor Sports	Panoz Esperante GT-LM	Ford (Elan) 5.0 L V8	P	51	(United States) Gunnar Jeannette	1, 9
(United States) Panoz Motor Sports	Panoz Esperante GT-LM	Ford (Elan) 5.0 L V8	P	51	(United Kingdom) Marino Franchitti	4–10
(United States) Panoz Motor Sports	Panoz Esperante GT-LM	Ford (Elan) 5.0 L V8	P	51	(France) Christophe Tinseau	6
(United States) TRG	Porsche 996 GT3-RSR	Porsche 3.6 L Flat-6	M	66	(United States) Michael Cawley	1
(United States) TRG	Porsche 996 GT3-RSR	Porsche 3.6 L Flat-6	M	66	(Belgium) Marc Sluszny	1
(United States) TRG	Porsche 996 GT3-RSR	Porsche 3.6 L Flat-6	M	66	(United States) Tracy Krohn	1
(United States) TRG	Porsche 996 GT3-RSR	Porsche 3.6 L Flat-6	M	67	(Germany) Pierre Ehret	1
(United States) TRG	Porsche 996 GT3-RSR	Porsche 3.6 L Flat-6	M	67	(United States) Kevin Buckler	1
(United States) TRG	Porsche 996 GT3-RSR	Porsche 3.6 L Flat-6	M	67	(United States) Andrew Davis	1
(United States) J-3 Racing	Porsche 996 GT3-RS	Porsche 3.6 L Flat-6	P	78	(United States) Michael Cawley	2
(United States) J-3 Racing	Porsche 996 GT3-RS	Porsche 3.6 L Flat-6	P	78	(United States) Rick Skelton	2
(United States) J-3 Racing	Porsche 996 GT3-RS	Porsche 3.6 L Flat-6	P	78	(Germany) Pierre Ehret	5
(United States) J-3 Racing	Porsche 996 GT3-RS	Porsche 3.6 L Flat-6	P	78	(United States) David Murry	5
(United States) J-3 Racing	Porsche 996 GT3-RS	Porsche 3.6 L Flat-6	P	78	(Canada) Tony Burgess	9
(United States) J-3 Racing	Porsche 996 GT3-RS	Porsche 3.6 L Flat-6	P	78	(United States) Leh Keen	9
(United States) J-3 Racing	Porsche 996 GT3-RS	Porsche 3.6 L Flat-6	P	78	(Italy) Marco Petrini	10
(United States) J-3 Racing	Porsche 996 GT3-RS	Porsche 3.6 L Flat-6	P	78	(Italy) Maurizio Fabris	10
(United States) J-3 Racing	Porsche 996 GT3-RSR	Porsche 3.6 L Flat-6	P	79	(United States) Justin Jackson	All
(United States) J-3 Racing	Porsche 996 GT3-RSR	Porsche 3.6 L Flat-6	P	79	(United Kingdom) Tim Sugden	1, 3–5, 7–10
(United States) J-3 Racing	Porsche 996 GT3-RSR	Porsche 3.6 L Flat-6	P	79	(Sweden) Niclas Jönsson	1–2, 9
(United States) J-3 Racing	Porsche 996 GT3-RSR	Porsche 3.6 L Flat-6	P	79	(United States) Michael Galati	6
(United Kingdom) IN2 Racing	Porsche 996 GT3-RSR	Porsche 3.6 L Flat-6	D	96	(Netherlands) Michael Vergers	1
(United Kingdom) IN2 Racing	Porsche 996 GT3-RSR	Porsche 3.6 L Flat-6	D	96	(Denmark) Juan Barazi	1
(United Kingdom) IN2 Racing	Porsche 996 GT3-RSR	Porsche 3.6 L Flat-6	D	96	(United Kingdom) Andrew Thompson	1

* Was on the entry list but did not participate in the event.

== Season results ==
Overall winner in bold.

Rnd	Circuit	LMP1 Winning Team	LMP2 Winning Team	GT1 Winning Team	GT2 Winning Team	Results
Rnd	Circuit	LMP1 Winning Drivers	LMP2 Winning Drivers	GT1 Winning Drivers	GT2 Winning Drivers	Results
1	Sebring	**(United States) #1 ADT Champion Racing**	(United States) #10 Miracle Motorsports	(United Kingdom) #57 Aston Martin Racing	(United States) #31 Petersen/White Lightning	Results
1	Sebring	**(Finland) JJ Lehto** **(Germany) Marco Werner** **(Denmark) Tom Kristensen**	(United States) Jeff Bucknum (United States) Chris McMurry (United Kingdom) Ian James	(United Kingdom) Darren Turner (Australia) David Brabham (Monaco) Stéphane Ortelli	(Germany) Jörg Bergmeister (United States) Patrick Long (Germany) Lucas Luhr	Results
2	Road Atlanta	**(United States) #1 ADT Champion Racing**	(United States) #37 Telesis Intersport Racing	(United States) #3 Corvette Racing	(United States) #50 Panoz Motorsports	Results
2	Road Atlanta	**(Finland) JJ Lehto** **(Germany) Marco Werner**	(United States) Jon Field (United States) Clint Field	(Canada) Ron Fellows (United States) Johnny O'Connell	(United States) Bill Auberlen (United Kingdom) Robin Liddell	Results
3	Mid-Ohio	**(United States) #16 Dyson Racing**	(United States) #8 B-K Motorsports^{†}	(United States) #3 Corvette Racing	(United States) #23 Alex Job Racing	Results
3	Mid-Ohio	**(United States) Butch Leitzinger** **(United Kingdom) James Weaver**	(United States) James Bach (United States) Guy Cosmo	(Canada) Ron Fellows (United States) Johnny O'Connell	(Germany) Timo Bernhard (France) Romain Dumas	Results
4	Lime Rock	**(United States) #1 ADT Champion Racing**	(United States) #10 Miracle Motorsports	(United States) #4 Corvette Racing	(United States) #23 Alex Job Racing	Results
4	Lime Rock	**(Finland) JJ Lehto** **(Germany) Marco Werner**	(United States) Jeff Bucknum (United States) Chris McMurry	(United Kingdom) Oliver Gavin (Monaco) Olivier Beretta	(Germany) Timo Bernhard (France) Romain Dumas	Results
5	Infineon	**(United States) #2 ADT Champion Racing**	(United States) #37 Intersport Racing	(United States) #3 Corvette Racing	(United States) #23 Alex Job Racing	Results
5	Infineon	**(Germany) Frank Biela** **(Italy) Emanuele Pirro**	(United States) Clint Field (United States) Liz Halliday	(Canada) Ron Fellows (United States) Johnny O'Connell	(Germany) Timo Bernhard (France) Romain Dumas	Results
6	Portland	**(United States) #2 ADT Champion Racing**	(United States) #37 Intersport Racing	(United States) #4 Corvette Racing	(United States) #23 Alex Job Racing	Results
6	Portland	**(Germany) Frank Biela** **(Italy) Emanuele Pirro**	(United Kingdom) Gregor Fisken (United States) Clint Field	(United Kingdom) Oliver Gavin (Monaco) Olivier Beretta	(Germany) Timo Bernhard (France) Romain Dumas	Results
7	Road America	**(United States) #2 ADT Champion Racing**	(United States) #10 Miracle Motorsports	(United States) #4 Corvette Racing	(United States) #31 Petersen/White Lightning	Results
7	Road America	**(Germany) Frank Biela** **(Italy) Emanuele Pirro**	(United States) Jeff Bucknum (United States) Chris McMurry	(United Kingdom) Oliver Gavin (Monaco) Olivier Beretta	(Germany) Jörg Bergmeister (United States) Patrick Long	Results
8	Mosport	**(United States) #16 Dyson Racing**	(United States) #37 Intersport Racing	(United States) #4 Corvette Racing	(United States) #31 Petersen/White Lightning	Results
8	Mosport	**(United States) Butch Leitzinger** **(United Kingdom) James Weaver**	(United States) Clint Field (United States) Liz Halliday	(United Kingdom) Oliver Gavin (Monaco) Olivier Beretta	(Germany) Jörg Bergmeister (United States) Patrick Long	Results
9	Road Atlanta	**(United States) #2 ADT Champion Racing**	(United States) #37 Intersport Racing	(United States) #4 Corvette Racing	(United States) #31 Petersen/White Lightning	Results
9	Road Atlanta	**(Germany) Frank Biela** **(Italy) Emanuele Pirro**	(United States) Jon Field (United States) Clint Field (United States) Liz Halliday	(United Kingdom) Oliver Gavin (Monaco) Olivier Beretta (Denmark) Jan Magnussen	(Germany) Jörg Bergmeister (United States) Patrick Long	Results
10	Laguna Seca	**(United Kingdom) #15 Zytek Engineering**	(United States) #6 Penske Racing	(United States) #4 Corvette Racing	(United States) #31 Petersen/White Lightning	Results
10	Laguna Seca	**(United Kingdom) Tom Chilton** **(Japan) Hayanari Shimoda**	(Germany) Lucas Luhr (Germany) Sascha Maassen	(United Kingdom) Oliver Gavin (Monaco) Olivier Beretta	(Germany) Jörg Bergmeister (United States) Patrick Long	Results

† - The #8 B-K Motorsports entry failed to finish but completed enough laps to score points.

== Championship results ==
Points are awarded to the top 10 finishers in the following order:

- 20-16-13-10-8-6-4-3-2-1

Exceptions were for the 4 Hour Monterey Sports Car Championships was scored in the following order:

- 23-19-16-13-11-9-7-6-5-4

And for the 12 Hours of Sebring and Petit Le Mans which award the top 10 finishers in the following order:

- 26-22-19-16-14-12-10-9-8-7

Cars failing to complete 70% of the winner's distance are not awarded points. Teams only score the points of their highest finishing entry in each race.

=== LMP1 Drivers' Championship ===
Pos.	Driver	Team	SEB (United States)	ATL (United States)	MOH (United States)	LIM (United States)	SON (United States)	POR (United States)	ROA (United States)	MOS (Canada)	ATL (United States)	LAG (United States)	Pts.
1	(Germany) Frank Biela	(United States) ADT/Champion Racing	2	3	3	2	1	1	1	3	1	2	182
1	(Italy) Emanuele Pirro	(United States) ADT/Champion Racing	2	3	3	2	1	1	1	3	1	2	182
2	(United States) Chris Dyson	(United States) Dyson Racing Team	4	2	2	4	2	2	2	4	2	3	154
3	(Finland) J.J. Lehto	(United States) ADT/Champion Racing	1	1	5	1	3	Ret	3	2	3	4	148
3	(Germany) Marco Werner	(United States) ADT/Champion Racing	1	1	5	1	3	Ret	3	2	3	4	148
4	(United Kingdom) Andy Wallace	(United States) Dyson Racing Team	3	2	2	4	2	2	2	4	Ret	3	135
5	(United Kingdom) James Weaver	(United States) Dyson Racing Team	3	4	1	3	4	3	5	1	Ret	5	124
5	(United States) Butch Leitzinger	(United States) Dyson Racing Team	3	4	1	3	4	3	5	1	Ret	5	124
6	(United States) Michael Lewis	(United States) Autocon Motorsports	Ret				Ret	4	4		4	6	45
6	(United States) Bryan Willman	(United States) Autocon Motorsports	Ret				Ret	4	4		4	6	45
7	(United Kingdom) Guy Smith	(United States) Dyson Racing Team	4								2		38
8	(Japan) Hayanari Shimoda	(United Kingdom) Zytek Engineering			4						Ret	1	33
8	(United Kingdom) Tom Chilton	(United Kingdom) Zytek Engineering			4						Ret	1	33
9	(Denmark) Tom Kristensen	(United States) ADT/Champion Racing	1										26
10	(United Kingdom) Allan McNish	(United States) ADT/Champion Racing	2										22
-	(United States) Tomy Drissi	(United States) Autocon Motorsports	Ret										0
-	(Portugal) Joăo Barbosa	(United Kingdom) Rollcentre Racing	Ret										0
-	(Belgium) Didier Theys	(United Kingdom) Rollcentre Racing	Ret										0
-	(Germany) Michael Krumm	(United Kingdom) Rollcentre Racing	Ret										0
Pos.	Driver	Team	SEB (United States)	ATL (United States)	MOH (United States)	LIM (United States)	SON (United States)	POR (United States)	ROA (United States)	MOS (Canada)	ATL (United States)	LAG (United States)	Pts.

=== LMP1 Teams Championship ===
Manufacturers only scored the points for their highest finishing entry in each race. Only full season entries were classified

Pos.	Team	No.	SEB (United States)	ATL (United States)	MOH (United States)	LIM (United States)	SON (United States)	POR (United States)	ROA (United States)	MOS (Canada)	ATL (United States)	LAG (United States)	Pts.
1	(United States) ADT/Champion Racing	1	1	1	5	1	3	Ret	3	2	3	4	200
1	(United States) ADT/Champion Racing	2	2	3	3	2	1	1	1	3	1	2	200
2	(United States) Dyson Racing Team	16	3	4	1	3	4	3	5	1	Ret	5	174
2	(United States) Dyson Racing Team	20	4	2	2	4	2	2	2	4	2	3	174
NC	(United States) Autocon Motorsports	12	Ret				Ret	4	4		4	6	0
NC	(United Kingdom) Zytek Engineering	15			4						Ret	1	0
NC	(United Kingdom) Rollcentre Racing	88	Ret										0
Pos.	Team		SEB (United States)	ATL (United States)	MOH (United States)	LIM (United States)	SON (United States)	POR (United States)	ROA (United States)	MOS (Canada)	ATL (United States)	LAG (United States)	Pts.

=== LMP2 Drivers' Championship ===
Pos.	Driver	Team	SEB (United States)	ATL (United States)	MOH (United States)	LIM (United States)	SON (United States)	POR (United States)	ROA (United States)	MOS (Canada)	ATL (United States)	LAG (United States)	Pts.
1	(United States) Clint Field	(United States) Intersport Racing	Ret	1	2		1	1	Ret	1	1	5	133
2	(United States) Chris McMurry	(United States) Miracle Motorsports	1	Ret	DSQ	1	2	Ret	1	2	Ret	2	117
2	(United States) Jeff Bucknum	(United States) Miracle Motorsports	1	Ret	DSQ	1	2	Ret	1	2	Ret	2	117
3	(United States) Guy Cosmo	(United States) B-K Motorsports		2	1	NC	3	2	Ret	3	2	3	116
3	(United States) James Bach	(United States) B-K Motorsports		2	1	NC	3	2	Ret	3	2	3	116
4	(United States) Liz Halliday	(United States) Intersport Racing	Ret				1		Ret	1	1	5	77
5	(United States) Jon Field	(United States) Intersport Racing	Ret	1	2						1	5	73
6	(United Kingdom) Ben Devlin	(United States) Van der Steur Racing		3	DNS	2			2	Ret	Ret	4	58
7	(United States) Gunnar van der Steur	(United States) Van der Steur Racing		3	DNS	2			2	Ret	Ret	4	45
8	(United Kingdom) Ian James	(United States) Miracle Motorsports	1										26
9	(Germany) Sascha Maassen	(United States) Penske Racing										1	23
9	(Germany) Lucas Luhr	(United States) Penske Racing										1	23
10	(United States) Elliot Forbes-Robinson	(United States) B-K Motorsports									2		22
11	(United Kingdom) Gregor Fisken	(United States) Intersport Racing	Ret					1					20
12	(United States) Mike Johnson	(United States) BAT Competition									3		19
12	(United States) Bob Woodman	(United States) BAT Competition									3		19
12	(France) Georges Forgeois	(United States) BAT Competition									3		19
12	(United States) James Gue	(United States) Miracle Motorsports									Ret	2	19
13	(United States) Eric van der Steur	(United States) Van der Steur Racing		3	DNS					Ret	Ret		13
-	(United Kingdom) Phillip Bennett	(Germany) Kruse Motorsport	Ret										0
-	(United Kingdom) Phillip Bennett	(Germany) Barazi-Kruse Motorsport									Ret		0
-	(United Kingdom) Ian Mitchell	(Germany) Kruse Motorsport	Ret										0
-	(Switzerland) Harold Primat	(Germany) Kruse Motorsport	Ret										0
-	(United States) Duncan Dayton	(United States) Intersport Racing	Ret										0
-	(United Kingdom) Gareth Ridpath	(United States) Intersport Racing	Ret										0
-	(United States) John Macaluso	(United States) Miracle Motorsports		Ret									0
-	(Denmark) Juan Barazi	(Germany) Barazi-Kruse Motorsport									Ret		0
-	(United States) Elton Julian	(Germany) Barazi-Kruse Motorsport									Ret		0
-	(United States) William Binnie	(United States) Binnie Motorsports	DSQ								Ret		0
-	(United Kingdom) Alan Timpany	(United States) Binnie Motorsports									Ret		0
-	(United Kingdom) Sam Hancock	(United States) Binnie Motorsports									Ret		0
-	(Belgium) Eric van de Poele	(Switzerland) Horag-Lista Racing									Ret		0
-	(Belgium) Didier Theys	(Switzerland) Horag-Lista Racing									Ret		0
-	(Canada) Robert Julien	(United States) Binnie Motorsports	DSQ										0
-	(United Kingdom) Adam Sharpe	(United States) Binnie Motorsports	DSQ										0
Pos.	Driver	Team	SEB (United States)	ATL (United States)	MOH (United States)	LIM (United States)	SON (United States)	POR (United States)	ROA (United States)	MOS (Canada)	ATL (United States)	LAG (United States)	Pts.

=== LMP2 Teams Championship ===
Manufacturers only scored the points for their highest finishing entry in each race. Only full season entries were classified

Pos.	Team	No.	SEB (United States)	ATL (United States)	MOH (United States)	LIM (United States)	SON (United States)	POR (United States)	ROA (United States)	MOS (Canada)	ATL (United States)	LAG (United States)	Pts.
1	(United States) Intersport Racing	30	Ret										133
1	(United States) Intersport Racing	37	Ret	1	2		1	1	Ret	1	1	5	133
2	(United States) Miracle Motorsports	10	1	Ret	DSQ	1	2	Ret	1	2	Ret	2	117
3	(United States) B-K Motorsports	8		2	1	NC	3	2	Ret	3	2	3	116
NC	(United States) Van der Steur Racing	19		3	DNS	2			2	Ret	Ret	4	0
NC	(United States) Penske Racing	6										1	0
NC	(United States) BAT Competition	7									3		0
NC	(Germany) Kruse Motorsport	27	Ret										0
NC	(Germany) Barazi-Kruse Motorsport	30									Ret		0
NC	(United States) Binnie Motorsports	15/41	DSQ								Ret		0
NC	(Switzerland) Horag-Lista Racing	27									Ret		0
Pos.	Team		SEB (United States)	ATL (United States)	MOH (United States)	LIM (United States)	SON (United States)	POR (United States)	ROA (United States)	MOS (Canada)	ATL (United States)	LAG (United States)	Pts.

=== GT1 Drivers' Championship ===
Pos.	Driver	Team	SEB (United States)	ATL (United States)	MOH (United States)	LIM (United States)	SON (United States)	POR (United States)	ROA (United States)	MOS (Canada)	ATL (United States)	LAG (United States)	Pts.
1	(United Kingdom) Oliver Gavin	(United States) Corvette Racing	3	2	2	1	2	1	1	1	1	1	196
1	(Monaco) Olivier Beretta	(United States) Corvette Racing	3	2	2	1	2	1	1	1	1	1	196
2	(Canada) Ron Fellows	(United States) Corvette Racing	2	1	1	2	1	2	2	2	6	2	177
2	(United States) Johnny O'Connell	(United States) Corvette Racing	2	1	1	2	1	2	2	2	6	2	177
3	(United States) Terry Borcheller	(United States) ACEMCO Motorsports	4	4	3	3	3	Ret	6	3	3	5	114
3	(United Kingdom) Johnny Mowlem	(United States) ACEMCO Motorsports	4	4	3	3	3	Ret	6	3	3	5	114
4	(United States) Tom Weickardt	(United States) Carsport America	7	6	6	Ret	5	5	4	5	7	6	75
4	(Italy) Michele Rugolo	(United States) Carsport America	7	6	6	Ret	5	5	4	5	7	6	75
5	(United States) Alex Figge	(United States) Pacific Coast Motorsports	6	5	4	5	6	3	5				65
5	(United Kingdom) Ryan Dalziel	(United States) Pacific Coast Motorsports	6	5	4	5	6	3	5				65
6	(Australia) David Brabham	(United Kingdom) Aston Martin Racing	1								2	4	61
6	(United Kingdom) Darren Turner	(United Kingdom) Aston Martin Racing	1								2	4	61
7	(Denmark) Jan Magnussen	(United States) Corvette Racing	3								1		45
8	(Netherlands) Peter Kox	(United Kingdom) Aston Martin Racing	8								5	3	39
8	(Portugal) Pedro Lamy	(United Kingdom) Aston Martin Racing	8								5	3	39
9	(Germany) Ralf Kelleners	(United States) ACEMCO Motorsports	4								3		35
10	(Italy) Max Papis	(United States) Corvette Racing	2								6		34
11	(France) Jean-Philippe Belloc	(United States) Carsport America	7							5	7		28
12	(Monaco) Stéphane Ortelli	(United Kingdom) Aston Martin Racing	1										26
13	(United Kingdom) Jonny Kane	(United Kingdom) Aston Martin Racing									2		22
14	(Czech Republic) Tomáš Enge	(United Kingdom) Aston Martin Racing									5		14
15	(Canada) David Empringham	(United States) Pacific Coast Motorsports	6										12
16	(France) Stephane Sarrazin	(United Kingdom) Aston Martin Racing	8										9
-	(Italy) Andrea Bertolini	(Italy) Maserati Corse	5	3	5	4	4		3	4	4	Ret	0(94)
-	(Italy) Fabrizio de Simone	(Italy) Maserati Corse	5	3	5		4	4	3	4	4	Ret	0(94)
-	(Italy) Fabio Babini	(Italy) Maserati Corse	5			4					4		0(40)
-	(Finland) Mika Salo	(Italy) Maserati Corse						4					0(10)
-	(United Kingdom) Nigel Smith	(United Kingdom) Graham Nash Motorsport	Ret										0
-	(United Kingdom) Ricky Cole	(United Kingdom) Graham Nash Motorsport	Ret										0
-	(United States) Rick Sutherland	(United Kingdom) Graham Nash Motorsport	Ret										0
-	(France) Christophe Bouchut	(France) Care Racing - Larbre	Ret										0
-	(Italy) Fabrizio Gollin	(France) Care Racing - Larbre	Ret										0
-	(France) Sébastien Bourdais	(France) Care Racing - Larbre	Ret										0
Pos.	Driver	Team	SEB (United States)	ATL (United States)	MOH (United States)	LIM (United States)	SON (United States)	POR (United States)	ROA (United States)	MOS (Canada)	ATL (United States)	LAG (United States)	Pts.

Note - Although Maserati Corse was allowed to race the non-homologated Maserati MC12, it was not allowed to score championship points.

=== GT1 Teams Championship ===
Manufacturers only scored the points for their highest finishing entry in each race. Only full season entries were classified

Pos.	Team	No.	SEB (United States)	ATL (United States)	MOH (United States)	LIM (United States)	SON (United States)	POR (United States)	ROA (United States)	MOS (Canada)	ATL (United States)	LAG (United States)	Pts.
1	(United States) Corvette Racing	3	2	1	1	2	1	2	2	2	6	2	211
1	(United States) Corvette Racing	4	3	2	2	1	2	1	1	1	1	1	211
2	(United States) ACEMCO Motorsports	63	4	4	3	3	3	Ret	6	3	3	5	114
3	(United States) Carsport America	71	7	6	6	Ret	5	5	4	5	7	6	75
4	(United States) Pacific Coast Motorsports	5	6	5	4	5	6	3	5				65
NC	(Italy) Maserati Corse	35	5	3	5	4	4	4	3	4	4	Ret	0(104)
NC	(United Kingdom) Aston Martin Racing	57	1								2	4	0
NC	(United Kingdom) Aston Martin Racing	58	8								5	3	0
NC	(United Kingdom) Graham Nash Motorsport	83	Ret										0
NC	(France) Care Racing - Larbre	86	Ret										0
Pos.	Team		SEB (United States)	ATL (United States)	MOH (United States)	LIM (United States)	SON (United States)	POR (United States)	ROA (United States)	MOS (Canada)	ATL (United States)	LAG (United States)	Pts.

=== GT2 Drivers' Championship ===
Pos.	Driver	Team	SEB (United States)	ATL (United States)	MOH (United States)	LIM (United States)	SON (United States)	POR (United States)	ROA (United States)	MOS (Canada)	ATL (United States)	LAG (United States)	Pts.
1	(United States) Patrick Long	(United States) White Lightning Racing	1	3	2	2	2	8	1	1	1	1	179
1	(Germany) Jörg Bergmeister	(United States) White Lightning Racing	1	3	2	2	2	8	1	1	1	1	179
2	(Germany) Timo Bernhard	(United States) Alex Job Racing	Ret	2	1	1	1	1	2	6	4	5	145
2	(France) Romain Dumas	(United States) Alex Job Racing	Ret	2	1	1	1	1	2	6	4	5	145
3	(United States) Johannes van Overbeek	(United States) Flying Lizard Motorsports	3	4	7	3	4	3	3	Ret	3	4	114
3	(United States) Jon Fogarty	(United States) Flying Lizard Motorsports	3	4	7	3	4	3	3	Ret	3	4	114
4	(Germany) Wolf Henzler	(United States) BAM!				9	3	2	4	3	5	3	84
5	(United Kingdom) Robin Liddell	(United States) Panoz Motor Sports	Ret	1	4	8	5	4	5	8	Ret	2	81
6	(United Kingdom) Tim Sugden	(United States) J-3 Racing	2		3	5	6		9	5	6	6	80
7	(Germany) Mike Rockenfeller	(United States) BAM!	Ret		5	9	3		4	3	5	3	76
8	(United States) Justin Jackson	(United States) J-3 Racing		6	3	5	6	6	9	5	6	6	70
9	(United States) Ian Baas	(United States) Alex Job Racing	Ret	5	Ret	4	8	9	6	2	2	Ret	67
10	(United States) Darren Law	(United States) Flying Lizard Motorsports	3										62
10	(United States) Darren Law	(United States) Alex Job Racing						9	6	2	3	Ret	62
11	(United States) Bill Auberlen	(United States) Panoz Motor Sports	Ret	1		8	5		5	8	Ret	2	61
12	(Sweden) Niclas Jönsson	(United States) J-3 Racing	2	6							6		40
12	(United States) Lonnie Pechnik	(United States) Flying Lizard Motorsports	Ret	8	6	7	7	7	8	4	Ret	8	40
12	(United States) Seth Neiman	(United States) Flying Lizard Motorsports	Ret	8	6	7	7	7	8	4	Ret	8	40
13	(United Kingdom) Marino Franchitti	(Netherlands) Spyker Squadron	Ret										39
13	(United Kingdom) Marino Franchitti	(United States) Panoz Motor Sports			4	6	Ret	5	7	7	Ret	7	39
14	(United States) Bryan Sellers	(United States) Panoz Motor Sports	Ret	9	8	6	Ret	4	7	7	Ret	7	36
15	(Denmark) Martin Jensen	(United States) BAM!	Ret					2			5		30
16	(Germany) Lucas Lühr	(United States) White Lightning Racing	1										26
17	(France) Emmanuel Collard	(United States) Alex Job Racing									2		22
17	(Germany) Marcel Tiemann	(United States) Alex Job Racing									2		22
18	(United States) Randy Pobst	(United States) Alex Job Racing	Ret	5	Ret	4	8						21
19	(United States) Michael Cawley	(United States) TRG	4										17
19	(United States) Michael Cawley	(United States) J-3 Racing		10							Ret		17
20	(United States) Tracy Krohn	(United States) TRG	4										16
20	(Belgium) Marc Sluszny	(United States) TRG	4										16
21	(Denmark) Juan Barazi	(United Kingdom) IN2 Racing	5										14
21	(Netherlands) Michael Vergers	(United Kingdom) IN2 Racing	5										14
21	(United Kingdom) Andrew Thompson	(United Kingdom) IN2 Racing	5										14
22	(United States) Steven Ivankovich	(United States) ZIP Racing	6										12
22	(United States) Spencer Pumpelly	(United States) ZIP Racing	6										12
22	(United States) Andy Lally	(United States) ZIP Racing	6										12
22	(Canada) Tony Burgess	(United States) BAM!	Ret	7	5								12
22	(Canada) Tony Burgess	(United States) J-3 Racing									Ret		12
23	(France) Christophe Tinseau	(United States) Panoz Motor Sports						5					8
24	(United States) Michael Galati	(United States) J-3 Racing						6					6
25	(Canada) Scott Maxwell	(United States) Panoz Motor Sports	Ret	9	8						Ret		5
25	(Italy) Marco Petrini	(United States) J-3 Racing										9	5
25	(Italy) Maurizio Fabris	(United States) J-3 Racing										9	5
26	(Germany) Sascha Maassen	(United States) Alex Job Racing	Ret										4
26	(Germany) Sascha Maassen	(United States) BAM!		7									4
27	(United States) Rick Skelton	(United States) J-3 Racing		10									1
-	(United States) David Murry	(United States) Flying Lizard Motorsports	Ret								Ret		0
-	(United States) David Murry	(United States) J-3 Racing					Ret						0
-	(Germany) Pierre Ehret	(United States) TRG	Ret										0
-	(Germany) Pierre Ehret	(United States) J-3 Racing					Ret						0
-	(United States) Gunnar Jeannette	(United States) Panoz Motor Sports	Ret								Ret		0
-	(United Kingdom) Richard Dean	(United Kingdom) Team LNT - Magic	Ret										0
-	(United Kingdom) Patrick Pearce	(United Kingdom) Team LNT - Magic	Ret										0
-	(United Kingdom) Marc Hynes	(United Kingdom) Team LNT - Magic	Ret										0
-	(United Kingdom) Lawrence Tomlinson	(United Kingdom) Team LNT - Magic	Ret										0
-	(United Kingdom) Jonny Kane	(United Kingdom) Team LNT - Magic	Ret										0
-	(United Kingdom) Warren Hughes	(United Kingdom) Team LNT - Magic	Ret										0
-	(Italy) Emanuele Naspetti	(United States) Panoz Motor Sports	Ret										0
-	(Netherlands) Tom Coronel	(Netherlands) Spyker Squadron	Ret										0
-	(Belgium) Marc Goossens	(Netherlands) Spyker Squadron	Ret										0
-	(Netherlands) Donny Crevels	(Netherlands) Spyker Squadron	Ret										0
-	(United States) Brian Cunningham	(United States) Alex Job Racing	Ret										0
-	(United States) Kevin Buckler	(United States) TRG	Ret										0
-	(United States) Andrew Davis	(United States) TRG	Ret										0
-	(Netherlands) Peter Van Merksteijn	(Netherlands) Spyker Squadron	Ret										0
-	(Netherlands) Frans Munsterhuis	(Netherlands) Spyker Squadron	Ret										0
-	(United States) Leh Keen	(United States) J-3 Racing									Ret		0
Pos.	Driver	Team	SEB (United States)	ATL (United States)	MOH (United States)	LIM (United States)	SON (United States)	POR (United States)	ROA (United States)	MOS (Canada)	ATL (United States)	LAG (United States)	Pts.

=== GT2 Teams Championship ===
Manufacturers only scored the points for their highest finishing entry in each race. Only full season entries were classified

Pos.	Team	No.	SEB (United States)	ATL (United States)	MOH (United States)	LIM (United States)	SON (United States)	POR (United States)	ROA (United States)	MOS (Canada)	ATL (United States)	LAG (United States)	Pts.
1	(United States) White Lightning Racing	31	1	3	2	2	2	8	1	1	1	1	179
2	(United States) Alex Job Racing	23	Ret	2	1	1	1	1	2	6	4	5	161
2	(United States) Alex Job Racing	24	Ret	5	Ret	4	8	9	6	2	2	Ret	161
3	(United States) Flying Lizard Motorsports	44	Ret	8	6	7	7	7	8	4	Ret	8	126
3	(United States) Flying Lizard Motorsports	45	3	4	7	3	4	3	3	Ret	3	4	126
4	(United States) BAM!	43	Ret	7	5	9	3	2	4	3	5	3	96
5	(United States) J-3 Racing	78		10			Ret				Ret	9	92
5	(United States) J-3 Racing	79	2	6	3	5	6	6	9	5	6	6	92
6	(United States) Panoz Motor Sports	50	Ret	1	4	8	5	4	5	8	Ret	2	85
6	(United States) Panoz Motor Sports	51	Ret	9	8	6	Ret	5	7	7	Ret	7	85
NC	(United States) TRG	66	4										0
NC	(United States) TRG	67	Ret										0
NC	(United Kingdom) IN2 Racing	96	5										0
NC	(United States) ZIP Racing	34	6										0
NC	(United Kingdom) Team LNT - Magic	40	Ret										0
NC	(United Kingdom) Team LNT - Magic	41	Ret										0
NC	(Netherlands) Spyker Squadron	47	Ret										0
NC	(Netherlands) Spyker Squadron	48	Ret										0
Pos.	Team		SEB (United States)	ATL (United States)	MOH (United States)	LIM (United States)	SON (United States)	POR (United States)	ROA (United States)	MOS (Canada)	ATL (United States)	LAG (United States)	Pts.
