= 2005 Grand Prix of Mosport =

Mosport International Raceway

The 2005 Labour Day Weekend Grand Prix of Mosport was the eighth race for the 2005 American Le Mans Series season and the twentieth IMSA SportsCar Championship race at the facility. It took place on September 4, 2005. The race was won overall by Dyson Racing drivers Butch Leitzinger and James Weaver in a MG-Lola EX257.

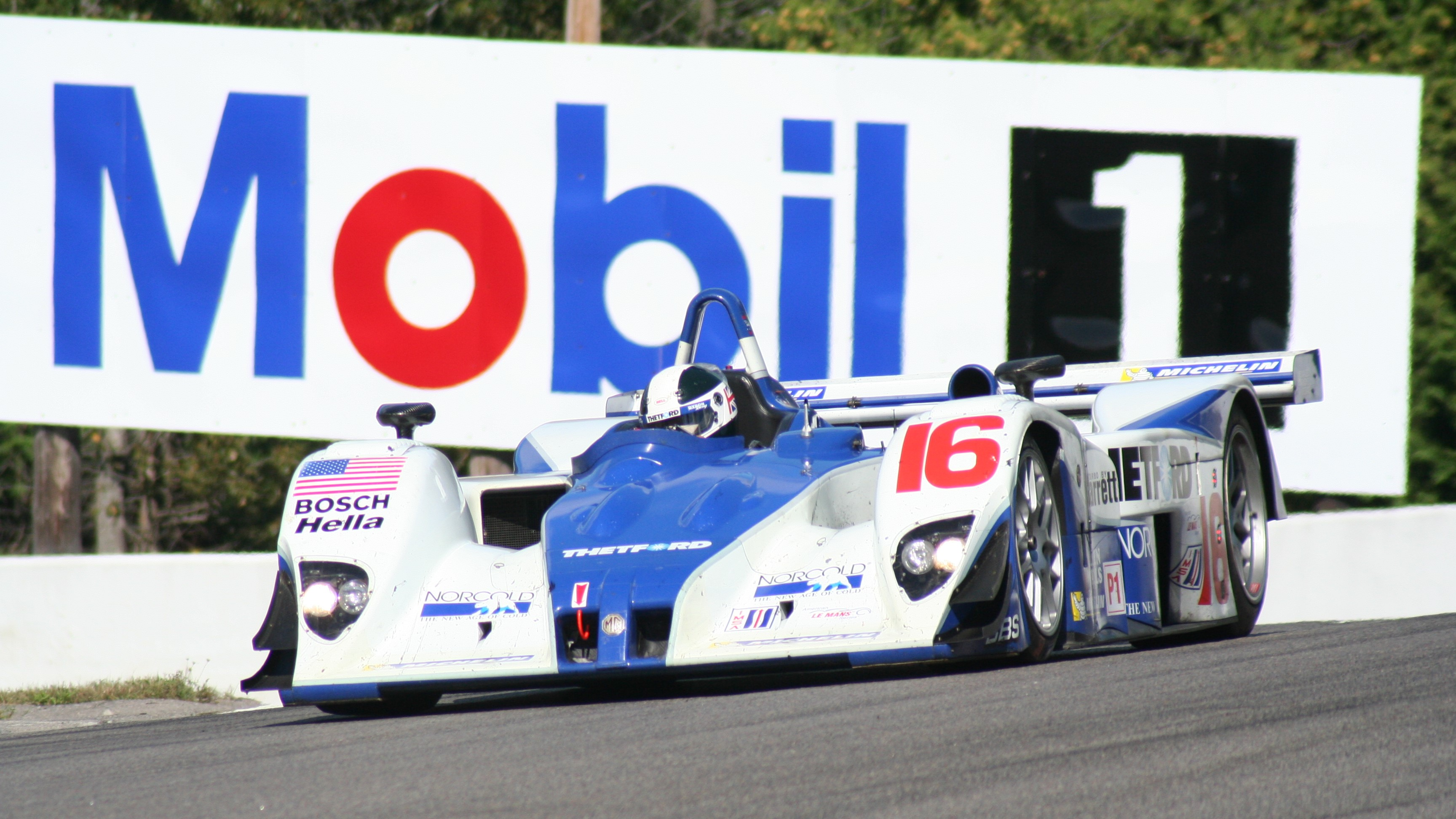
Dyson Racing MG-Lola EX257 - Winner 2005 Grand Prix of Mosport

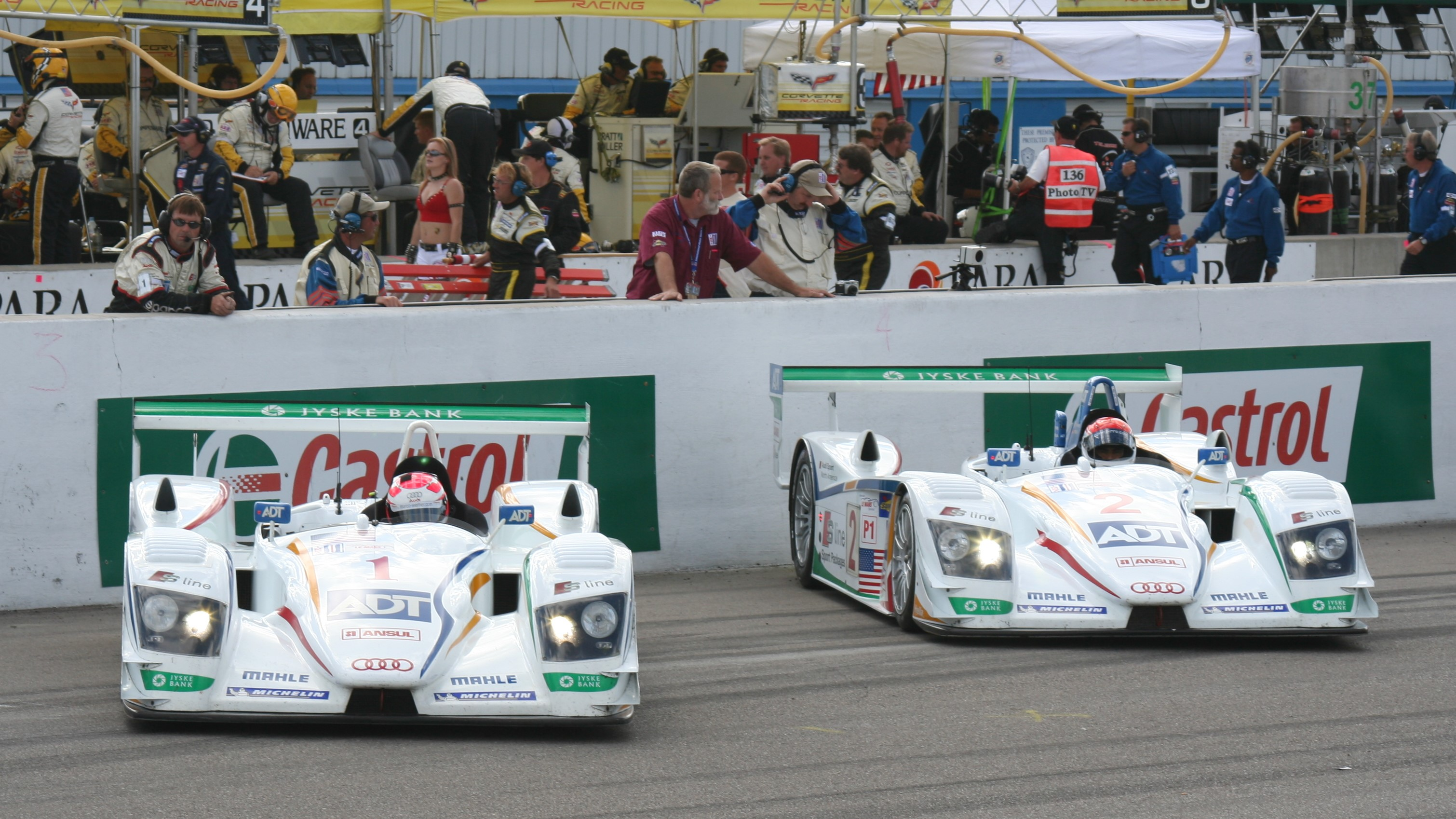
Champion Racing Audi R8s on the starting grid

== Official results ==
Class winners in bold. Cars failing to complete 70% of winner's distance marked as Not Classified (NC).

Pos	Class	No	Team	Drivers	Chassis	Tyre	Laps
Pos	Class	No	Team	Drivers	Engine	Tyre	Laps
1	**LMP1**	**16**	**(United States) Dyson Racing**	**(United States) Butch Leitzinger (United Kingdom) James Weaver**	**MG-Lola EX257**	MI	**127**
1	**LMP1**	**16**	**(United States) Dyson Racing**	**(United States) Butch Leitzinger (United Kingdom) James Weaver**	**MG (AER) XP20 2.0L Turbo I4**	MI	**127**
2	LMP1	1	(United States) ADT Champion Racing	(Germany) Marco Werner (Finland) JJ Lehto	Audi R8	MI	127
2	LMP1	1	(United States) ADT Champion Racing	(Germany) Marco Werner (Finland) JJ Lehto	Audi 3.6L Turbo V8	MI	127
3	LMP1	2	(United States) ADT Champion Racing	(Germany) Frank Biela (Italy) Emanuele Pirro	Audi R8	MI	126
3	LMP1	2	(United States) ADT Champion Racing	(Germany) Frank Biela (Italy) Emanuele Pirro	Audi 3.6L Turbo V8	MI	126
4	LMP1	20	(United States) Dyson Racing	(United States) Chris Dyson (United Kingdom) Andy Wallace	MG-Lola EX257	MI	125
4	LMP1	20	(United States) Dyson Racing	(United States) Chris Dyson (United Kingdom) Andy Wallace	MG (AER) XP20 2.0L Turbo I4	MI	125
5	**LMP2**	**37**	**(United States) Intersport Racing**	**(United States) Clint Field (United Kingdom) Liz Halliday**	**Lola B05/40**	G	**120**
5	**LMP2**	**37**	**(United States) Intersport Racing**	**(United States) Clint Field (United Kingdom) Liz Halliday**	**AER P07 2.0L Turbo I4**	G	**120**
6	**GT1**	**4**	**(United States) Corvette Racing**	**(United Kingdom) Oliver Gavin (Monaco) Olivier Beretta**	**Chevrolet Corvette C6.R**	MI	**119**
6	**GT1**	**4**	**(United States) Corvette Racing**	**(United Kingdom) Oliver Gavin (Monaco) Olivier Beretta**	**Chevrolet 7.0L V8**	MI	**119**
7	GT1	3	(United States) Corvette Racing	(Canada) Ron Fellows (United States) Johnny O'Connell	Chevrolet Corvette C6.R	MI	119
7	GT1	3	(United States) Corvette Racing	(Canada) Ron Fellows (United States) Johnny O'Connell	Chevrolet 7.0L V8	MI	119
8	GT1	63	(United States) ACEMCO Motorsports	(United States) Terry Borcheller (United Kingdom) Johnny Mowlem	Saleen S7-R	MI	119
8	GT1	63	(United States) ACEMCO Motorsports	(United States) Terry Borcheller (United Kingdom) Johnny Mowlem	Ford 7.0L V8	MI	119
9	GT1	35	(Italy) Maserati Corse (United States) Risi Competizione	(Italy) Andrea Bertolini (Italy) Fabrizio de Simone	Maserati MC12	P	118
9	GT1	35	(Italy) Maserati Corse (United States) Risi Competizione	(Italy) Andrea Bertolini (Italy) Fabrizio de Simone	Maserati 6.0L V12	P	118
10	LMP2	10	(United States) Miracle Motorsports	(United States) Jeff Bucknum (United States) Chris McMurry	Courage C65	KU	117
10	LMP2	10	(United States) Miracle Motorsports	(United States) Jeff Bucknum (United States) Chris McMurry	AER P07 2.0L Turbo I4	KU	117
11	LMP2	8	(United States) B-K Motorsports	(United States) Guy Cosmo (United States) James Bach	Courage C65	G	113
11	LMP2	8	(United States) B-K Motorsports	(United States) Guy Cosmo (United States) James Bach	Mazda R20B 2.0L 3-Rotor	G	113
12	GT1	71	(United States) Carsport America	(Italy) Michele Rugolo (United States) Tom Weickardt (France) Jean-Philippe Belloc	Dodge Viper GTS-R	P	112
12	GT1	71	(United States) Carsport America	(Italy) Michele Rugolo (United States) Tom Weickardt (France) Jean-Philippe Belloc	Dodge 8.0L V10	P	112
13	**GT2**	**31**	**(United States) Petersen Motorsports (United States) White Lightning Racing**	**(United States) Patrick Long (Germany) Jörg Bergmeister**	**Porsche 911 GT3-RSR**	MI	**110**
13	**GT2**	**31**	**(United States) Petersen Motorsports (United States) White Lightning Racing**	**(United States) Patrick Long (Germany) Jörg Bergmeister**	**Porsche 3.6L Flat-6**	MI	**110**
14	GT2	24	(United States) Alex Job Racing	(United States) Ian Baas (United States) Darren Law	Porsche 911 GT3-RSR	MI	110
14	GT2	24	(United States) Alex Job Racing	(United States) Ian Baas (United States) Darren Law	Porsche 3.6L Flat-6	MI	110
15	GT2	43	(United States) BAM!	(Germany) Mike Rockenfeller (Germany) Wolf Henzler	Porsche 911 GT3-RSR	Y	109
15	GT2	43	(United States) BAM!	(Germany) Mike Rockenfeller (Germany) Wolf Henzler	Porsche 3.6L Flat-6	Y	109
16	GT2	44	(United States) Flying Lizard Motorsports	(United States) Lonnie Pechnik (United States) Seth Neiman	Porsche 911 GT3-RSR	MI	109
16	GT2	44	(United States) Flying Lizard Motorsports	(United States) Lonnie Pechnik (United States) Seth Neiman	Porsche 3.6L Flat-6	MI	109
17	GT2	79	(United States) J3 Racing	(United States) Justin Jackson (United Kingdom) Tim Sugden	Porsche 911 GT3-RSR	P	108
17	GT2	79	(United States) J3 Racing	(United States) Justin Jackson (United Kingdom) Tim Sugden	Porsche 3.6L Flat-6	P	108
18	GT2	23	(United States) Alex Job Racing	(Germany) Timo Bernhard (France) Romain Dumas	Porsche 911 GT3-RSR	MI	108
18	GT2	23	(United States) Alex Job Racing	(Germany) Timo Bernhard (France) Romain Dumas	Porsche 3.6L Flat-6	MI	108
19	GT2	51	(United States) Panoz Motor Sports	(United States) Bryan Sellers (United Kingdom) Marino Franchitti	Panoz Esperante GT-LM	P	107
19	GT2	51	(United States) Panoz Motor Sports	(United States) Bryan Sellers (United Kingdom) Marino Franchitti	Ford (Élan) 5.0L V8	P	107
20 DNF	GT2	50	(United States) Panoz Motor Sports	(United States) Bill Auberlen (United Kingdom) Robin Liddell	Panoz Esperante GT-LM	P	91
20 DNF	GT2	50	(United States) Panoz Motor Sports	(United States) Bill Auberlen (United Kingdom) Robin Liddell	Ford (Élan) 5.0L V8	P	91
21 DNF	GT2	45	(United States) Flying Lizard Motorsports	(United States) Johannes van Overbeek (United States) Jon Fogarty	Porsche 911 GT3-RSR	MI	68
21 DNF	GT2	45	(United States) Flying Lizard Motorsports	(United States) Johannes van Overbeek (United States) Jon Fogarty	Porsche 3.6L Flat-6	MI	68
22 DNF	LMP2	19	(United States) Van der Steur Racing	(United States) Gunnar van der Steur (United States) Eric van der Steur (United Kingdom) Ben Devlin	Lola B2K/40	D	26
22 DNF	LMP2	19	(United States) Van der Steur Racing	(United States) Gunnar van der Steur (United States) Eric van der Steur (United Kingdom) Ben Devlin	Nissan (AER) 3.0L V6	D	26
FINAL RACE RESULTS

== Statistics ==
- Pole Position - #20 Dyson Racing - 1:07.682
- Fastest Lap - #16 Dyson Racing - 1:08.596
- Distance - 312.293 miles (502.587 km)
- Average Speed - 124.024 mph (199.597 km/h)

American Le Mans Series
Previous race: 2005 Road America 500	2005 season	Next race: 2005 Petit Le Mans
