= 2005 Grand Prix of Sonoma =

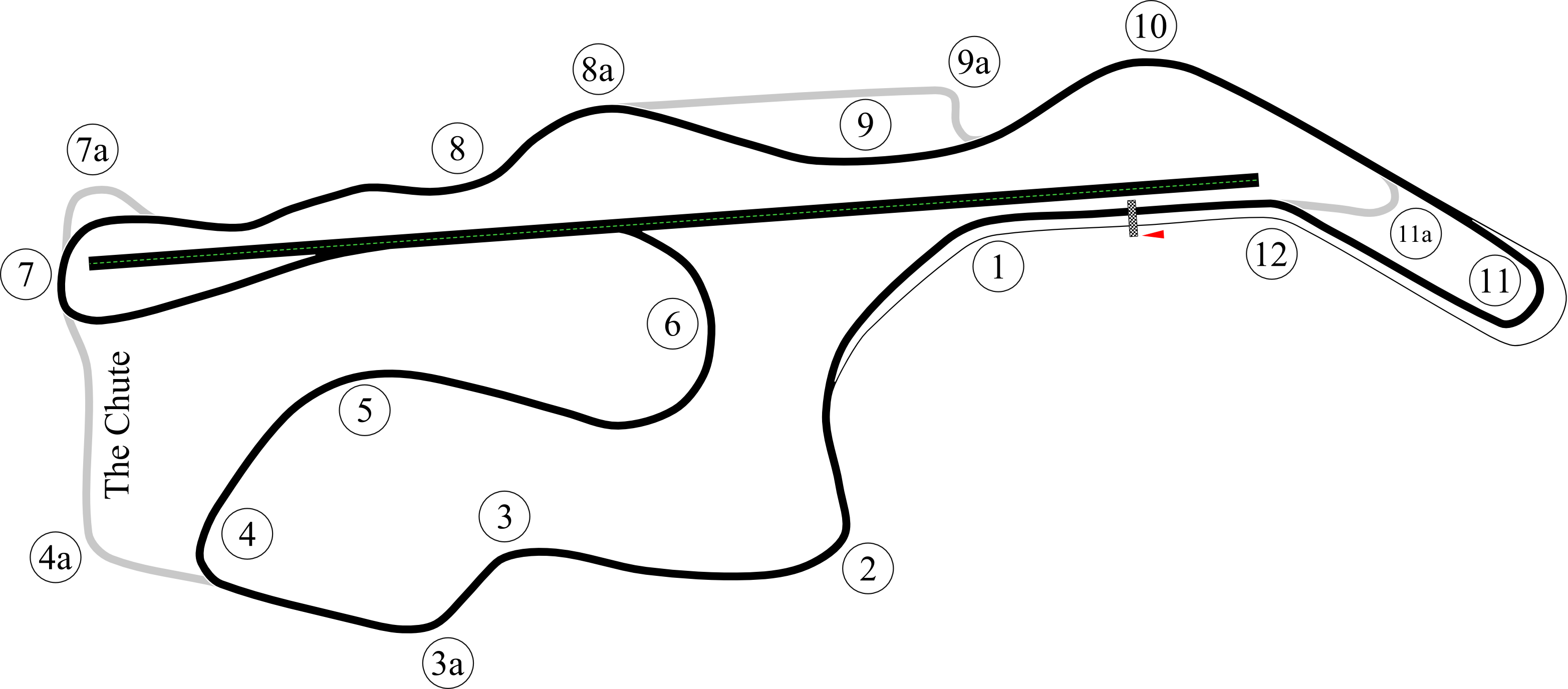
Sonoma Raceway

The 2005 Grand Prix of Sonoma was the fifth race for the 2005 American Le Mans Series season, held at Infineon Raceway. It took place on July 17, 2005. It was the last ALMS race held at Infineon. It was the final ALMS race held at Sonoma, the event being transferred to the Rolex Sports Car Series the following year.

== Official results ==
Class winners in bold. Cars failing to complete 70% of winner's distance marked as Not Classified (NC).

Pos	Class	No	Team	Drivers	Chassis	Tyre	Laps
Pos	Class	No	Team	Drivers	Engine	Tyre	Laps
1	**LMP1**	**2**	**(United States) ADT Champion Racing**	**(Germany) Frank Biela (Italy) Emanuele Pirro**	**Audi R8**	M	**111**
1	**LMP1**	**2**	**(United States) ADT Champion Racing**	**(Germany) Frank Biela (Italy) Emanuele Pirro**	**Audi 3.6L Turbo V8**	M	**111**
2	LMP1	20	(United States) Dyson Racing	(United States) Chris Dyson (United Kingdom) Andy Wallace	MG-Lola EX257	M	111
2	LMP1	20	(United States) Dyson Racing	(United States) Chris Dyson (United Kingdom) Andy Wallace	MG (AER) XP20 2.0L Turbo I4	M	111
3	LMP1	1	(United States) ADT Champion Racing	(Germany) Marco Werner (Finland) JJ Lehto	Audi R8	M	110
3	LMP1	1	(United States) ADT Champion Racing	(Germany) Marco Werner (Finland) JJ Lehto	Audi 3.6L Turbo V8	M	110
4	**LMP2**	**37**	**(United States) Intersport Racing**	**(United States) Clint Field (United Kingdom) Liz Halliday**	**Lola B05/40**	G	**105**
4	**LMP2**	**37**	**(United States) Intersport Racing**	**(United States) Clint Field (United Kingdom) Liz Halliday**	**AER P07 2.0L Turbo I4**	G	**105**
5	LMP1	16	(United States) Dyson Racing	(United States) Butch Leitzinger (United Kingdom) James Weaver	MG-Lola EX257	M	105
5	LMP1	16	(United States) Dyson Racing	(United States) Butch Leitzinger (United Kingdom) James Weaver	MG (AER) XP20 2.0L Turbo I4	M	105
6	LMP2	10	(United States) Miracle Motorsports	(United States) Jeff Bucknum (United States) Chris McMurry	Courage C65	K	105
6	LMP2	10	(United States) Miracle Motorsports	(United States) Jeff Bucknum (United States) Chris McMurry	AER P07 2.0L Turbo I4	K	105
7	**GT1**	**3**	**(United States) Corvette Racing**	**(Canada) Ron Fellows (United States) Johnny O'Connell**	**Chevrolet Corvette C6.R**	M	**104**
7	**GT1**	**3**	**(United States) Corvette Racing**	**(Canada) Ron Fellows (United States) Johnny O'Connell**	**Chevrolet 7.0L V8**	M	**104**
8	GT1	4	(United States) Corvette Racing	(United Kingdom) Oliver Gavin (Monaco) Olivier Beretta	Chevrolet Corvette C6.R	M	104
8	GT1	4	(United States) Corvette Racing	(United Kingdom) Oliver Gavin (Monaco) Olivier Beretta	Chevrolet 7.0L V8	M	104
9	GT1	63	(United States) ACEMCO Motorsports	(United States) Terry Borcheller (United Kingdom) Johnny Mowlem	Saleen S7-R	M	104
9	GT1	63	(United States) ACEMCO Motorsports	(United States) Terry Borcheller (United Kingdom) Johnny Mowlem	Ford 7.0L V8	M	104
10	LMP2	8	(United States) B-K Motorsport	(United States) Guy Cosmo (United States) James Bach	Courage C65	G	102
10	LMP2	8	(United States) B-K Motorsport	(United States) Guy Cosmo (United States) James Bach	Mazda R20B 2.0L 3-Rotor	G	102
11	GT1	35	(Italy) Maserati Corse (United States) Risi Competizione	(Italy) Andrea Bertolini (Italy) Fabrizio de Simone	Maserati MC12	P	102
11	GT1	35	(Italy) Maserati Corse (United States) Risi Competizione	(Italy) Andrea Bertolini (Italy) Fabrizio de Simone	Maserati 6.0L V12	P	102
12	**GT2**	**23**	**(United States) Alex Job Racing**	**(Germany) Timo Bernhard (France) Romain Dumas**	**Porsche 911 GT3-RSR**	M	**100**
12	**GT2**	**23**	**(United States) Alex Job Racing**	**(Germany) Timo Bernhard (France) Romain Dumas**	**Porsche 3.6L Flat-6**	M	**100**
13	GT2	31	(United States) Petersen Motorsports (United States) White Lightning Racing	(Germany) Jörg Bergmeister (United States) Patrick Long	Porsche 911 GT3-RSR	M	99
13	GT2	31	(United States) Petersen Motorsports (United States) White Lightning Racing	(Germany) Jörg Bergmeister (United States) Patrick Long	Porsche 3.6L Flat-6	M	99
14	GT2	43	(United States) BAM!	(Germany) Mike Rockenfeller (Germany) Wolf Henzler	Porsche 911 GT3-RSR	Y	99
14	GT2	43	(United States) BAM!	(Germany) Mike Rockenfeller (Germany) Wolf Henzler	Porsche 3.6L Flat-6	Y	99
15	GT2	45	(United States) Flying Lizard Motorsports	(United States) Johannes van Overbeek (United States) Jon Fogarty	Porsche 911 GT3-RSR	M	98
15	GT2	45	(United States) Flying Lizard Motorsports	(United States) Johannes van Overbeek (United States) Jon Fogarty	Porsche 3.6L Flat-6	M	98
16	GT2	50	(United States) Panoz Motor Sports	(United States) Bill Auberlen (United Kingdom) Robin Liddell	Panoz Esperante GT-LM	P	98
16	GT2	50	(United States) Panoz Motor Sports	(United States) Bill Auberlen (United Kingdom) Robin Liddell	Ford (Elan) 5.0L V8	P	98
17	GT2	79	(United States) J3 Racing	(United States) Justin Jackson (United Kingdom) Tim Sugden	Porsche 911 GT3-RSR	P	97
17	GT2	79	(United States) J3 Racing	(United States) Justin Jackson (United Kingdom) Tim Sugden	Porsche 3.6L Flat-6	P	97
18	GT2	44	(United States) Flying Lizard Motorsports	(United States) Lonnie Pechnik (United States) Seth Neiman	Porsche 911 GT3-RSR	M	96
18	GT2	44	(United States) Flying Lizard Motorsports	(United States) Lonnie Pechnik (United States) Seth Neiman	Porsche 3.6L Flat-6	M	96
19	GT2	24	(United States) Alex Job Racing	(United States) Ian Baas (United States) Randy Pobst	Porsche 911 GT3-RSR	M	96
19	GT2	24	(United States) Alex Job Racing	(United States) Ian Baas (United States) Randy Pobst	Porsche 3.6L Flat-6	M	96
20 DNF	GT1	71	(United States) Carsport America	(Italy) Michele Rugolo (United States) Tom Weickardt	Dodge Viper GTS-R	P	80
20 DNF	GT1	71	(United States) Carsport America	(Italy) Michele Rugolo (United States) Tom Weickardt	Dodge 8.0L V10	P	80
21 DNF	GT1	5	(United States) Pacific Coast Motorsports	(United States) Alex Figge (United Kingdom) Ryan Dalziel	Chevrolet Corvette C5-R	Y	78
21 DNF	GT1	5	(United States) Pacific Coast Motorsports	(United States) Alex Figge (United Kingdom) Ryan Dalziel	Chevrolet 7.0L V8	Y	78
22 DNF	GT2	78	(United States) J3 Racing	(Germany) Pierre Ehret (United States) David Murry	Porsche 911 GT3-RSR	P	47
22 DNF	GT2	78	(United States) J3 Racing	(Germany) Pierre Ehret (United States) David Murry	Porsche 3.6L Flat-6	P	47
23 DNF	GT2	51	(United States) Panoz Motor Sports	(United States) Bryan Sellers (United Kingdom) Marino Franchitti	Panoz Esperante GT-LM	P	39
23 DNF	GT2	51	(United States) Panoz Motor Sports	(United States) Bryan Sellers (United Kingdom) Marino Franchitti	Ford (Elan) 5.0L V8	P	39
24 DNF	LMP1	12	(United States) Autocon Motorsports	(United States) Bryan Willman (United States) Michael Lewis	Riley & Scott Mk III C	D	5
24 DNF	LMP1	12	(United States) Autocon Motorsports	(United States) Bryan Willman (United States) Michael Lewis	Elan 6L8 6.0L V8	D	5

== Statistics ==
- Pole Position - #20 Dyson Racing - 1:21.688
- Fastest Lap - #1 ADT Champion Racing - 1:22.041
- Distance - 280.83 miles (451.95 km)
- Average Speed - 101.395 mph (163.179 km/h)

American Le Mans Series
Previous race: 2005 New England Grand Prix	2005 season	Next race: 2005 Portland Grand Prix
