= 2005 American Le Mans at Mid-Ohio =

The layout of Mid-Ohio Sports Car Course

The 2005 American Le Mans at Mid-Ohio was the third race for the 2005 American Le Mans Series season held at Mid-Ohio sports car course.The event was held on May 22, 2005.

== Official results ==
Class winners in bold. Cars failing to complete 70% of winner's distance marked as Not Classified (NC).

Pos	Class	No	Team	Drivers	Chassis	Tyre	Laps
Pos	Class	No	Team	Drivers	Engine	Tyre	Laps
1	**LMP1**	**16**	**(United States) Dyson Racing**	**(United States) Butch Leitzinger (United Kingdom) James Weaver**	**MG-Lola EX257**	MI	**117**
1	**LMP1**	**16**	**(United States) Dyson Racing**	**(United States) Butch Leitzinger (United Kingdom) James Weaver**	**MG (AER) XP20 2.0L Turbo I4**	MI	**117**
2	LMP1	20	(United States) Dyson Racing	(United States) Chris Dyson (United Kingdom) Andy Wallace	MG-Lola EX257	MI	117
2	LMP1	20	(United States) Dyson Racing	(United States) Chris Dyson (United Kingdom) Andy Wallace	MG (AER) XP20 2.0L Turbo I4	MI	117
3	LMP1	2	(United States) ADT Champion Racing	(Germany) Frank Biela (Italy) Emanuele Pirro	Audi R8	MI	116
3	LMP1	2	(United States) ADT Champion Racing	(Germany) Frank Biela (Italy) Emanuele Pirro	Audi 3.6L Turbo V8	MI	116
4	LMP1	15	(United Kingdom) Zytek Engineering	(United Kingdom) Tom Chilton (Japan) Hayanari Shimoda	Zytek 04S	MI	113
4	LMP1	15	(United Kingdom) Zytek Engineering	(United Kingdom) Tom Chilton (Japan) Hayanari Shimoda	Zytek ZG348 3.4L V8	MI	113
5	**GT1**	**3**	**(United States) Corvette Racing**	**(Canada) Ron Fellows (United States) Johnny O'Connell**	**Chevrolet Corvette C6.R**	MI	**112**
5	**GT1**	**3**	**(United States) Corvette Racing**	**(Canada) Ron Fellows (United States) Johnny O'Connell**	**Chevrolet 7.0L V8**	MI	**112**
6	GT1	4	(United States) Corvette Racing	(United Kingdom) Oliver Gavin (Monaco) Olivier Beretta	Chevrolet Corvette C6.R	MI	112
6	GT1	4	(United States) Corvette Racing	(United Kingdom) Oliver Gavin (Monaco) Olivier Beretta	Chevrolet 7.0L V8	MI	112
7	GT1	63	(United States) ACEMCO Motorsports	(United States) Terry Borcheller (United Kingdom) Johnny Mowlem	Saleen S7-R	MI	112
7	GT1	63	(United States) ACEMCO Motorsports	(United States) Terry Borcheller (United Kingdom) Johnny Mowlem	Ford 7.0L V8	MI	112
8	GT1	5	(United States) Pacific Coast Motorsports	(United States) Alex Figge (United Kingdom) Ryan Dalziel	Chevrolet Corvette C5-R	Y	110
8	GT1	5	(United States) Pacific Coast Motorsports	(United States) Alex Figge (United Kingdom) Ryan Dalziel	Chevrolet 7.0L V8	Y	110
9	**GT2**	**23**	**(United States) Alex Job Racing**	**(Germany) Timo Bernhard (France) Romain Dumas**	**Porsche 911 GT3-RSR**	MI	**109**
9	**GT2**	**23**	**(United States) Alex Job Racing**	**(Germany) Timo Bernhard (France) Romain Dumas**	**Porsche 3.6L Flat-6**	MI	**109**
10	GT2	31	(United States) Petersen Motorsports (United States) White Lightning Racing	(United States) Patrick Long (Germany) Jörg Bergmeister	Porsche 911 GT3-RSR	MI	109
10	GT2	31	(United States) Petersen Motorsports (United States) White Lightning Racing	(United States) Patrick Long (Germany) Jörg Bergmeister	Porsche 3.6L Flat-6	MI	109
11	GT1	35	(Italy) Maserati Corse (United States) Risi Competizione	(Italy) Andrea Bertolini (Italy) Fabrizio de Simone	Maserati MC12	P	109
11	GT1	35	(Italy) Maserati Corse (United States) Risi Competizione	(Italy) Andrea Bertolini (Italy) Fabrizio de Simone	Maserati 6.0L V12	P	109
12	GT2	79	(United States) J3 Racing	(United States) Justin Jackson (United Kingdom) Tim Sugden	Porsche 911 GT3-RSR	P	107
12	GT2	79	(United States) J3 Racing	(United States) Justin Jackson (United Kingdom) Tim Sugden	Porsche 3.6L Flat-6	P	107
13	GT2	50	(United States) Panoz Motor Sports	(United Kingdom) Robin Liddell (United Kingdom) Marino Franchitti	Panoz Esperante GT-LM	P	106
13	GT2	50	(United States) Panoz Motor Sports	(United Kingdom) Robin Liddell (United Kingdom) Marino Franchitti	Ford (Elan) 5.0L V8	P	106
14	**LMP2**	**8**	**(United States) B-K Motorsports**	**(United States) Guy Cosmo (United States) James Bach**	**Courage C65**	G	**105**
14	**LMP2**	**8**	**(United States) B-K Motorsports**	**(United States) Guy Cosmo (United States) James Bach**	**Mazda R20B 2.0L 3-Rotor**	G	**105**
15	GT2	43	(United States) BAM!	(Germany) Mike Rockenfeller (Canada) Tony Burgess	Porsche 911 GT3-RSR	Y	105
15	GT2	43	(United States) BAM!	(Germany) Mike Rockenfeller (Canada) Tony Burgess	Porsche 3.6L Flat-6	Y	105
16	GT2	44	(United States) Flying Lizard Motorsports	(United States) Lonnie Pechnik (United States) Seth Neiman	Porsche 911 GT3-RSR	MI	105
16	GT2	44	(United States) Flying Lizard Motorsports	(United States) Lonnie Pechnik (United States) Seth Neiman	Porsche 3.6L Flat-6	MI	105
17 DNF	GT2	45	(United States) Flying Lizard Motorsports	(United States) Johannes van Overbeek (United States) Jon Fogarty	Porsche 911 GT3-RSR	MI	97
17 DNF	GT2	45	(United States) Flying Lizard Motorsports	(United States) Johannes van Overbeek (United States) Jon Fogarty	Porsche 3.6L Flat-6	MI	97
18	LMP1	1	(United States) ADT Champion Racing	(Germany) Marco Werner (Finland) JJ Lehto	Audi R8	MI	97
18	LMP1	1	(United States) ADT Champion Racing	(Germany) Marco Werner (Finland) JJ Lehto	Audi 3.6L Turbo V8	MI	97
19	GT1	71	(United States) Carsport America	(Italy) Michele Rugolo (United States) Tom Weickardt	Dodge Viper GTS-R	P	96
19	GT1	71	(United States) Carsport America	(Italy) Michele Rugolo (United States) Tom Weickardt	Dodge 8.0L V10	P	96
20 DNF	LMP2	37	(United States) Telesis Intersport Racing	(United States) Jon Field (United States) Clint Field	Lola B05/40	G	85
20 DNF	LMP2	37	(United States) Telesis Intersport Racing	(United States) Jon Field (United States) Clint Field	AER P07 2.0L Turbo I4	G	85
21	GT2	51	(United States) Panoz Motor Sports	(United States) Bryan Sellers (Canada) Scott Maxwell	Panoz Esperante GT-LM	P	85
21	GT2	51	(United States) Panoz Motor Sports	(United States) Bryan Sellers (Canada) Scott Maxwell	Ford (Elan) 5.0L V8	P	85
22 DNF	GT2	24	(United States) Alex Job Racing	(United States) Ian Baas (United States) Randy Pobst	Porsche 911 GT3-RSR	MI	14
22 DNF	GT2	24	(United States) Alex Job Racing	(United States) Ian Baas (United States) Randy Pobst	Porsche 3.6L Flat-6	MI	14
23 DSQ^{†}	LMP2	10	(United States) Miracle Motorsports	(United States) Jeff Bucknum (United States) Chris McMurry	Courage C65	KU	103
23 DSQ^{†}	LMP2	10	(United States) Miracle Motorsports	(United States) Jeff Bucknum (United States) Chris McMurry	AER P07 2.0L Turbo I4	KU	103

† - #10 Miracle Motorsports was disqualified for having a driver in the car over the maximum allowable limit.

== Statistics ==
- Pole Position - #15 Zytek Engineering - 1:11.333
- Fastest Lap - #15 Zytek Engineering - 1:12.592
- Distance - 264.186 miles (425.166 km)
- Average Speed - 91.354 mph (147.020 km/h)

American Le Mans Series
Previous race: 2005 Grand Prix of Atlanta	2005 season	Next race: 2005 New England Grand Prix
