= Marc Sluszny =

Belgian extreme sportsman

Mark Sluszny
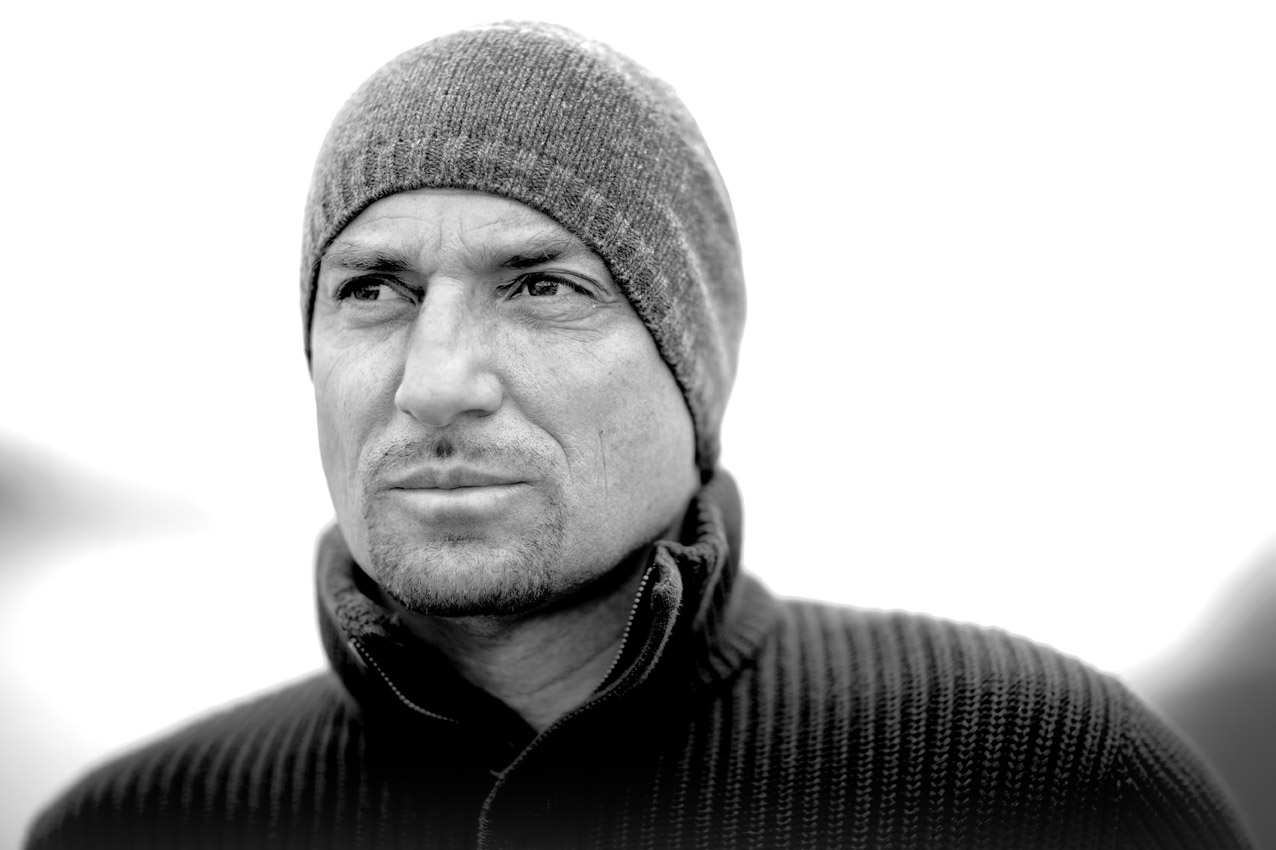
- Born: February 1, 1962
- Died: June 28, 2018

Marc Sluszny (born in Antwerp, February 1, 1962 – June 28, 2018) was an adventurer, sportsman, keynote speaker, mental coach and author. Through extreme sports he searched to overcome his mental and physical boundaries. He broke several records and participated many times in the European and World Championships in different disciplines. During the last few years, Marc focused on coaching executive teams and high-level athletes.

== Career ==
Marc Sluszny competed in a wide range of endurance and extreme sports. He represented Belgium in Davis Cup tennis in 1982 and swam solo across the English Channel in 1988. During the 1990's, he set a high-altitude bungee-jumping record, won the Belgian skysurfing championship, and participated in a Belgian expedition to Annapurna.

In 2000 he broke the Belgian hang gliding record aerobatics. In 2002 he was a member of the Belgian Olympic Fencing Team and finished 8th at the World Championships and 12th at the European Championships per team. As first Belgian ever he participated in the Rolex Sydney-Hobart yacht race. In 2005 he finished several 24-hour auto races, among others Daytona and Nürburgring. In 2006 he flew across the United States from coast to coast with an old-timer seaplane (Lake Buccaneer). In 2007, he broke the altitude record (11,300 m) in a glider above the Andes. In 2008 he was team leader of the first Belgian diving expedition to the wreck of the HMHS Britannic (-120 m).

In 2009 he finished 4th at the World Championships Powerboat racing. In 2011 he was the pilot and captain of the national Belgian bobsleigh team (two- and four-man) and participated in both the World and European Championships. Furthermore, in 2011 the movie Sharkwise was released in the Belgian theaters, a documentary about his diving adventure outside of the cage with the great white shark. In June 2012 he ran down the Belgacom building in Brussels, setting a new world record (15'56) in the vertical run discipline. And in 2013 Marc dived to a depth of 168 meters (on open circuit) in the Blue hole in Dahab (Egypt). During the month of July 2016, Marc was part of a US diving expedition to the sunken liner ship, the SS Andrea Doria (its 60th anniversary).

== Works ==
- 2006: A rush of blood to the head (ISBN 907688630X )
- 2007: Cleared for the option (ISBN 9782803449699 )
- 2008: 40,000 ft above the Andes (ISBN 9789460010378 )
- 2009: De negen levens van Marc Sluszny (Dutch) (ISBN 9789460010293 )
- 2011: SHARKWISE (Sluszny) (ISBN 9789081685313 )
- 2013: Fear Less (ISBN 9789081685399)
- 2016: Pushing The Limits (ISBN 9789491545351)
- 2017: Gedreven (Dutch) (ISBN 9789491545467)

=== Thrillers ===
- 2004: Code zwart (Van Loock & Sluszny) (Dutch)
- 2005: De witte salamander (Van Loock & Sluszny)(Dutch)
- 2006: En garde (Van Loock & Sluszny)(Dutch)
- 2007: De bende (Van Loock & Sluszny)¨(Dutch)
- 2009: Amulet (Van Loock & Sluszny)(Dutch)
- 2011: Het mysterie van de Britannic (Van Loock & Sluszny)(Dutch)

=== Movie ===
- 2011: SHARKWISE this docu-film tells the compelling story of Marc Sluszny's quest to discover the true face of the ocean's most feared predator, the Great White Shark. The movie is narrated by Martin Sheen and directed by Lieven Debrauwer

== Awards ==
- 2004 - Hercule Poirot award, nominated for Code zwart
- 2005 - Diamanten Kogel award, nominated for De witte salamander
- 2011 - Van Gogh award, winner with SHARKWISE
- 2011 - Cannes Independent Film Festival, official selection with SHARKWISE

== Link ==
- Officiële website
- Executive Coaching
- Marc Sluszny Books
