= 2005 Grand Prix of Atlanta =

Track map of Road Atlanta

The 2005 Grand Prix of Atlanta was the second race for the 2005 American Le Mans Series season held at Road Atlanta. It took place on April 17, 2005.

== Official results ==
Class winners in bold. Cars failing to complete 70% of winner's distance marked as Not Classified (NC).

| Pos | Class | No | Team | Drivers | Chassis | Tyre | Laps |
| Pos | Class | No | Team | Drivers | Engine | Tyre | Laps |
|---|---|---|---|---|---|---|---|
| 1 | **LMP1** | **1** | **(United States) ADT Champion Racing** | **(Germany) Marco Werner (Finland) JJ Lehto** | **Audi R8** | MI | **112** |
| 1 | **LMP1** | **1** | **(United States) ADT Champion Racing** | **(Germany) Marco Werner (Finland) JJ Lehto** | **Audi 3.6L Turbo V8** | MI | **112** |
| 2 | LMP1 | 20 | (United States) Dyson Racing | (United States) Chris Dyson (United Kingdom) Andy Wallace | MG-Lola EX257 | MI | 112 |
| 2 | LMP1 | 20 | (United States) Dyson Racing | (United States) Chris Dyson (United Kingdom) Andy Wallace | MG (AER) XP20 2.0L Turbo I4 | MI | 112 |
| 3 | LMP1 | 2 | (United States) ADT Champion Racing | (Germany) Frank Biela (Italy) Emanuele Pirro | Audi R8 | MI | 111 |
| 3 | LMP1 | 2 | (United States) ADT Champion Racing | (Germany) Frank Biela (Italy) Emanuele Pirro | Audi 3.6L Turbo V8 | MI | 111 |
| 4 | **LMP2** | **37** | **(United States) Telesis Intersport Racing** | **(United States) Jon Field (United States) Clint Field** | **Lola B05/40** | G | **108** |
| 4 | **LMP2** | **37** | **(United States) Telesis Intersport Racing** | **(United States) Jon Field (United States) Clint Field** | **AER P07 2.0L Turbo I4** | G | **108** |
| 5 | **GT1** | **3** | **(United States) Corvette Racing** | **(Canada) Ron Fellows (United States) Johnny O'Connell** | **Chevrolet Corvette C6.R** | MI | **108** |
| 5 | **GT1** | **3** | **(United States) Corvette Racing** | **(Canada) Ron Fellows (United States) Johnny O'Connell** | **Chevrolet 7.0L V8** | MI | **108** |
| 6 | GT1 | 4 | (United States) Corvette Racing | (United Kingdom) Oliver Gavin (Monaco) Olivier Beretta | Chevrolet Corvette C6.R | MI | 107 |
| 6 | GT1 | 4 | (United States) Corvette Racing | (United Kingdom) Oliver Gavin (Monaco) Olivier Beretta | Chevrolet 7.0L V8 | MI | 107 |
| 7 | GT1 | 35 | (Italy) Maserati Corse (United States) Risi Competizione | (Italy) Andrea Bertolini (Italy) Fabrizio de Simone | Maserati MC12 | P | 107 |
| 7 | GT1 | 35 | (Italy) Maserati Corse (United States) Risi Competizione | (Italy) Andrea Bertolini (Italy) Fabrizio de Simone | Maserati 6.0L V12 | P | 107 |
| 8 | GT1 | 63 | (United States) ACEMCO Motorsports | (United States) Terry Borcheller (United Kingdom) Johnny Mowlem | Saleen S7-R | MI | 107 |
| 8 | GT1 | 63 | (United States) ACEMCO Motorsports | (United States) Terry Borcheller (United Kingdom) Johnny Mowlem | Ford 7.0L V8 | MI | 107 |
| 9 | GT1 | 5 | (United States) Pacific Coast Motorsports | (United States) Alex Figge (United Kingdom) Ryan Dalziel | Chevrolet Corvette C5-R | Y | 106 |
| 9 | GT1 | 5 | (United States) Pacific Coast Motorsports | (United States) Alex Figge (United Kingdom) Ryan Dalziel | Chevrolet 7.0L V8 | Y | 106 |
| 10 | LMP1 | 16 | (United States) Dyson Racing | (United States) Butch Leitzinger (United Kingdom) James Weaver | MG-Lola EX257 | MI | 105 |
| 10 | LMP1 | 16 | (United States) Dyson Racing | (United States) Butch Leitzinger (United Kingdom) James Weaver | MG (AER) XP20 2.0L Turbo I4 | MI | 105 |
| 11 | **GT2** | **50** | **(United States) Panoz Motor Sports** | **(United States) Bill Auberlen (United Kingdom) Robin Liddell** | **Panoz Esperante GT-LM** | P | **105** |
| 11 | **GT2** | **50** | **(United States) Panoz Motor Sports** | **(United States) Bill Auberlen (United Kingdom) Robin Liddell** | **Ford (Elan) 5.0L V8** | P | **105** |
| 12 | GT2 | 23 | (United States) Alex Job Racing | (Germany) Timo Bernhard (France) Romain Dumas | Porsche 911 GT3-RSR | MI | 105 |
| 12 | GT2 | 23 | (United States) Alex Job Racing | (Germany) Timo Bernhard (France) Romain Dumas | Porsche 3.6L Flat-6 | MI | 105 |
| 13 | GT2 | 31 | (United States) Petersen Motorsports (United States) White Lightning Racing | (Germany) Jörg Bergmeister (United States) Patrick Long | Porsche 911 GT3-RSR | MI | 104 |
| 13 | GT2 | 31 | (United States) Petersen Motorsports (United States) White Lightning Racing | (Germany) Jörg Bergmeister (United States) Patrick Long | Porsche 3.6L Flat-6 | MI | 104 |
| 14 | GT1 | 71 | (United States) Carsport America | (Italy) Michele Rugolo (United States) Tom Weickardt | Dodge Viper GTS-R | P | 103 |
| 14 | GT1 | 71 | (United States) Carsport America | (Italy) Michele Rugolo (United States) Tom Weickardt | Dodge 8.0L V10 | P | 103 |
| 15 | GT2 | 45 | (United States) Flying Lizard Motorsports | (United States) Jon Fogarty (United States) Johannes van Overbeek | Porsche 911 GT3-RSR | MI | 103 |
| 15 | GT2 | 45 | (United States) Flying Lizard Motorsports | (United States) Jon Fogarty (United States) Johannes van Overbeek | Porsche 3.6L Flat-6 | MI | 103 |
| 16 | GT2 | 24 | (United States) Alex Job Racing | (United States) Ian Baas (United States) Randy Pobst | Porsche 911 GT3-RSR | MI | 102 |
| 16 | GT2 | 24 | (United States) Alex Job Racing | (United States) Ian Baas (United States) Randy Pobst | Porsche 3.6L Flat-6 | MI | 102 |
| 17 | LMP2 | 8 | (United States) B-K Motorsports | (United States) Guy Cosmo (United States) James Bach | Courage C65 | G | 102 |
| 17 | LMP2 | 8 | (United States) B-K Motorsports | (United States) Guy Cosmo (United States) James Bach | Mazda R20B 2.0L 3-rotor | G | 102 |
| 18 | GT2 | 79 | (United States) J3 Racing | (United States) Justin Jackson (Sweden) Niclas Jönsson | Porsche 911 GT3-RSR | P | 102 |
| 18 | GT2 | 79 | (United States) J3 Racing | (United States) Justin Jackson (Sweden) Niclas Jönsson | Porsche 3.6L Flat-6 | P | 102 |
| 19 | GT2 | 43 | (United States) BAM! | (Germany) Sascha Maassen (Canada) Tony Burgess | Porsche 911 GT3-RSR | Y | 101 |
| 19 | GT2 | 43 | (United States) BAM! | (Germany) Sascha Maassen (Canada) Tony Burgess | Porsche 3.6L Flat-6 | Y | 101 |
| 20 | GT2 | 44 | (United States) Flying Lizard Motorsports | (United States) Lonnie Pechnik (United States) Seth Neiman | Porsche 911 GT3-RSR | MI | 101 |
| 20 | GT2 | 44 | (United States) Flying Lizard Motorsports | (United States) Lonnie Pechnik (United States) Seth Neiman | Porsche 3.6L Flat-6 | MI | 101 |
| 21 | GT2 | 51 | (United States) Panoz Motor Sports | (United States) Bryan Sellers (Canada) Scott Maxwell | Panoz Esperante GT-LM | P | 92 |
| 21 | GT2 | 51 | (United States) Panoz Motor Sports | (United States) Bryan Sellers (Canada) Scott Maxwell | Ford (Elan) 5.0L V8 | P | 92 |
| 22 | GT2 | 78 | (United States) J3 Racing | (United States) Rick Skelton (United States) Michael Cawley | Porsche 911 GT3-RS | P | 90 |
| 22 | GT2 | 78 | (United States) J3 Racing | (United States) Rick Skelton (United States) Michael Cawley | Porsche 3.6L Flat-6 | P | 90 |
| 23 | LMP2 | 19 | (United States) Van der Steur Racing | (United States) Gunnar van der Steur (United States) Eric van der Steur (United Kingdom) Ben Devlin | Lola B2K/40 | D | 85 |
| 23 | LMP2 | 19 | (United States) Van der Steur Racing | (United States) Gunnar van der Steur (United States) Eric van der Steur (United Kingdom) Ben Devlin | AER (Nissan) 3.0L V6 | D | 85 |
| 24 DNF | LMP2 | 10 | (United States) Miracle Motorsports | (United States) Jeff Bucknum (United States) Chris McMurry (United States) John Macaluso | Courage C65 | KU | 50 |
| 24 DNF | LMP2 | 10 | (United States) Miracle Motorsports | (United States) Jeff Bucknum (United States) Chris McMurry (United States) John Macaluso | AER P07 2.0L Turbo I4 | KU | 50 |

== Statistics ==
- Pole Position - #16 Dyson Racing - 1:11.241
- Fastest Lap - #1 ADT Champion Racing - 1:12.784
- Distance - 284.48 miles (457.83 km)
- Average Speed - 103.162 mph (166.023 km/h)

American Le Mans Series
| Previous race: 2005 12 Hours of Sebring | 2005 season | Next race: 2005 American Le Mans at Mid-Ohio |
