= 2005 Road America 500 =

Track map of Road America.

The 2005 Generac 500 was the seventh race for the 2005 American Le Mans Series season held at Road America. It took place on August 21, 2005.

== Official results ==
Class winners in bold. Cars failing to complete 70% of winner's distance marked as Not Classified (NC).

| Pos | Class | No | Team | Drivers | Chassis | Tyre | Laps |
| Pos | Class | No | Team | Drivers | Engine | Tyre | Laps |
|---|---|---|---|---|---|---|---|
| 1 | **LMP1** | **2** | **(United States) ADT Champion Racing** | **(Germany) Frank Biela (Italy) Emanuele Pirro** | **Audi R8** | MI | **72** |
| 1 | **LMP1** | **2** | **(United States) ADT Champion Racing** | **(Germany) Frank Biela (Italy) Emanuele Pirro** | **Audi 3.6L Turbo V8** | MI | **72** |
| 2 | LMP1 | 20 | (United States) Dyson Racing | (United States) Chris Dyson (United Kingdom) Andy Wallace | MG-Lola EX257 | MI | 72 |
| 2 | LMP1 | 20 | (United States) Dyson Racing | (United States) Chris Dyson (United Kingdom) Andy Wallace | MG (AER) XP20 2.0L Turbo I4 | MI | 72 |
| 3 | LMP1 | 1 | (United States) ADT Champion Racing | (Germany) Marco Werner (Finland) JJ Lehto | Audi R8 | MI | 72 |
| 3 | LMP1 | 1 | (United States) ADT Champion Racing | (Germany) Marco Werner (Finland) JJ Lehto | Audi 3.6L Turbo V8 | MI | 72 |
| 4 | **GT1** | **4** | **(United States) Corvette Racing** | **(United Kingdom) Oliver Gavin (Monaco) Olivier Beretta** | **Chevrolet Corvette C6.R** | MI | **71** |
| 4 | **GT1** | **4** | **(United States) Corvette Racing** | **(United Kingdom) Oliver Gavin (Monaco) Olivier Beretta** | **Chevrolet 7.0L V8** | MI | **71** |
| 5 | GT1 | 3 | (United States) Corvette Racing | (Canada) Ron Fellows (United States) Johnny O'Connell | Chevrolet Corvette C6.R | MI | 71 |
| 5 | GT1 | 3 | (United States) Corvette Racing | (Canada) Ron Fellows (United States) Johnny O'Connell | Chevrolet 7.0L V8 | MI | 71 |
| 6 | **LMP2** | **10** | **(United States) Miracle Motorsports** | **(United States) Jeff Bucknum (United States) Chris McMurry** | **Courage C65** | KU | **69** |
| 6 | **LMP2** | **10** | **(United States) Miracle Motorsports** | **(United States) Jeff Bucknum (United States) Chris McMurry** | **AER P07 2.0L Turbo I4** | KU | **69** |
| 7 | LMP1 | 12 | (United States) Autocon Motorsports | (United States) Bryan Willman (United States) Michael Lewis | Riley & Scott Mk III C | D | 69 |
| 7 | LMP1 | 12 | (United States) Autocon Motorsports | (United States) Bryan Willman (United States) Michael Lewis | Elan 6L8 6.0L V8 | D | 69 |
| 8 | GT1 | 35 | (Italy) Maserati Corse (United States) Risi Competizione | (Italy) Andrea Bertolini (Italy) Fabrizio de Simone | Maserati MC12 | P | 69 |
| 8 | GT1 | 35 | (Italy) Maserati Corse (United States) Risi Competizione | (Italy) Andrea Bertolini (Italy) Fabrizio de Simone | Maserati 6.0L V12 | P | 69 |
| 9 | **GT2** | **31** | **(United States) Petersen Motorsports (United States) White Lightning Racing** | **(United States) Patrick Long (Germany) Jörg Bergmeister** | **Porsche 911 GT3-RSR** | MI | **69** |
| 9 | **GT2** | **31** | **(United States) Petersen Motorsports (United States) White Lightning Racing** | **(United States) Patrick Long (Germany) Jörg Bergmeister** | **Porsche 3.6L Flat-6** | MI | **69** |
| 10 | GT2 | 23 | (United States) Alex Job Racing | (Germany) Timo Bernhard (France) Romain Dumas | Porsche 911 GT3-RSR | MI | 69 |
| 10 | GT2 | 23 | (United States) Alex Job Racing | (Germany) Timo Bernhard (France) Romain Dumas | Porsche 3.6L Flat-6 | MI | 69 |
| 11 | GT2 | 45 | (United States) Flying Lizard Motorsports | (United States) Johannes van Overbeek (United States) Jon Fogarty | Porsche 911 GT3-RSR | MI | 69 |
| 11 | GT2 | 45 | (United States) Flying Lizard Motorsports | (United States) Johannes van Overbeek (United States) Jon Fogarty | Porsche 3.6L Flat-6 | MI | 69 |
| 12 | LMP1 | 16 | (United States) Dyson Racing | (United States) Butch Leitzinger (United Kingdom) James Weaver | MG-Lola EX257 | MI | 68 |
| 12 | LMP1 | 16 | (United States) Dyson Racing | (United States) Butch Leitzinger (United Kingdom) James Weaver | MG (AER) XP20 2.0L Turbo I4 | MI | 68 |
| 13 | GT2 | 43 | (United States) BAM! | (Germany) Mike Rockenfeller (Germany) Wolf Henzler | Porsche 911 GT3-RSR | Y | 68 |
| 13 | GT2 | 43 | (United States) BAM! | (Germany) Mike Rockenfeller (Germany) Wolf Henzler | Porsche 3.6L Flat-6 | Y | 68 |
| 14 | LMP2 | 19 | (United States) Van der Steur Racing | (United States) Gunnar van der Steur (United Kingdom) Ben Devlin | Lola B2K/40 | D | 67 |
| 14 | LMP2 | 19 | (United States) Van der Steur Racing | (United States) Gunnar van der Steur (United Kingdom) Ben Devlin | Nissan (AER) 3.0L V6 | D | 67 |
| 15 | GT2 | 50 | (United States) Panoz Motor Sports | (United States) Bill Auberlen (United Kingdom) Robin Liddell | Panoz Esperante GT-LM | P | 67 |
| 15 | GT2 | 50 | (United States) Panoz Motor Sports | (United States) Bill Auberlen (United Kingdom) Robin Liddell | Ford (Elan) 5.0L V8 | P | 67 |
| 16 | GT2 | 24 | (United States) Alex Job Racing | (United States) Ian Baas (United States) Darren Law | Porsche 911 GT3-RSR | MI | 67 |
| 16 | GT2 | 24 | (United States) Alex Job Racing | (United States) Ian Baas (United States) Darren Law | Porsche 3.6L Flat-6 | MI | 67 |
| 17 | GT2 | 51 | (United States) Panoz Motor Sports | (United States) Bryan Sellers (United Kingdom) Marino Franchitti | Panoz Esperante GT-LM | P | 67 |
| 17 | GT2 | 51 | (United States) Panoz Motor Sports | (United States) Bryan Sellers (United Kingdom) Marino Franchitti | Ford (Elan) 6.0L V8 | P | 67 |
| 18 | GT2 | 44 | (United States) Flying Lizard Motorsports | (United States) Lonnie Pechnik (United States) Seth Neiman | Porsche 911 GT3-RSR | MI | 67 |
| 18 | GT2 | 44 | (United States) Flying Lizard Motorsports | (United States) Lonnie Pechnik (United States) Seth Neiman | Ford (Elan) 5.0L V8 | MI | 67 |
| 19 | GT2 | 79 | (United States) J3 Racing | (United States) Justin Jackson (United Kingdom) Tim Sugden | Porsche 911 GT3-RSR | P | 66 |
| 19 | GT2 | 79 | (United States) J3 Racing | (United States) Justin Jackson (United Kingdom) Tim Sugden | Porsche 3.6L Flat-6 | P | 66 |
| 20 | GT1 | 71 | (United States) Carsport America | (Italy) Michele Rugolo (United States) Tom Weickardt | Dodge Viper GTS-R | P | 66 |
| 20 | GT1 | 71 | (United States) Carsport America | (Italy) Michele Rugolo (United States) Tom Weickardt | Dodge 8.0L V10 | P | 66 |
| 21 DNF | GT1 | 5 | (United States) Pacific Coast Motorsports | (United States) Alex Figge (United Kingdom) Ryan Dalziel | Chevrolet Corvette C5-R | Y | 61 |
| 21 DNF | GT1 | 5 | (United States) Pacific Coast Motorsports | (United States) Alex Figge (United Kingdom) Ryan Dalziel | Chevrolet 7.0L V8 | Y | 61 |
| 22 DNF | GT1 | 63 | (United States) ACEMCO Motorsports | (United States) Terry Borcheller (United Kingdom) Johnny Mowlem | Saleen S7-R | MI | 58 |
| 22 DNF | GT1 | 63 | (United States) ACEMCO Motorsports | (United States) Terry Borcheller (United Kingdom) Johnny Mowlem | Ford 7.0L V8 | MI | 58 |
| 23 DNF | LMP2 | 37 | (United States) Intersport Racing | (United States) Clint Field (United Kingdom) Liz Halliday | Lola B05/40 | G | 13 |
| 23 DNF | LMP2 | 37 | (United States) Intersport Racing | (United States) Clint Field (United Kingdom) Liz Halliday | AER P07 2.0L Turbo I4 | G | 13 |
| 23 DNF | LMP2 | 8 | (United States) B-K Motorsport | (United States) Guy Cosmo (United States) Jamie Bach | Courage C65 | G | 2 |
| 23 DNF | LMP2 | 8 | (United States) B-K Motorsport | (United States) Guy Cosmo (United States) Jamie Bach | Mazda R20B 2.0L 3-Rotor | G | 2 |

== Statistics ==
- Pole Position - #16 Dyson Racing - 1:53.042
- Fastest Lap - #2 ADT Champion Racing - 1:54.569
- Distance - 291.456 miles (469.053 km)
- Average Speed - 105.489 mph (169.768 km/h)

American Le Mans Series
| Previous race: 2005 Portland Grand Prix | 2005 season | Next race: 2005 Grand Prix of Mosport |
