= 2005 New England Grand Prix =

Track map of Lime Rock Park

The 2005 New England Grand Prix was the fourth race for the 2005 American Le Mans Series season held at Lime Rock Park. It took place on July 4, 2005.

== Official results ==
Class winners in bold. Cars failing to complete 70% of winner's distance marked as Not Classified (NC).

Pos	Class	No	Team	Drivers	Chassis	Tyre	Laps
Pos	Class	No	Team	Drivers	Engine	Tyre	Laps
1	**LMP1**	**1**	**(United States) ADT Champion Racing**	**(Germany) Marco Werner (Finland) JJ Lehto**	**Audi R8**	M	**165**
1	**LMP1**	**1**	**(United States) ADT Champion Racing**	**(Germany) Marco Werner (Finland) JJ Lehto**	**Audi 3.6L Turbo V8**	M	**165**
2	LMP1	2	(United States) ADT Champion Racing	(Germany) Frank Biela (Italy) Emanuele Pirro	Audi R8	M	165
2	LMP1	2	(United States) ADT Champion Racing	(Germany) Frank Biela (Italy) Emanuele Pirro	Audi 3.6L Turbo V8	M	165
3	**GT1**	**4**	**(United States) Corvette Racing**	**(United Kingdom) Oliver Gavin (Monaco) Olivier Beretta**	**Chevrolet Corvette C6.R**	M	**159**
3	**GT1**	**4**	**(United States) Corvette Racing**	**(United Kingdom) Oliver Gavin (Monaco) Olivier Beretta**	**Chevrolet 7.0L V8**	M	**159**
4	GT1	3	(United States) Corvette Racing	(Canada) Ron Fellows (United States) Johnny O'Connell	Chevrolet Corvette C6.R	M	157
4	GT1	3	(United States) Corvette Racing	(Canada) Ron Fellows (United States) Johnny O'Connell	Chevrolet 7.0L V8	M	157
5	GT1	63	(United States) ACEMCO Motorsports	(United States) Terry Borcheller (Canada) Johnny Mowlem	Saleen S7-R	M	156
5	GT1	63	(United States) ACEMCO Motorsports	(United States) Terry Borcheller (Canada) Johnny Mowlem	Ford 7.0L V8	M	156
6	GT1	35	(Italy) Maserati Corse (United States) Risi Competizione	(Italy) Andrea Bertolini (Italy) Fabio Babini	Maserati MC12	P	156
6	GT1	35	(Italy) Maserati Corse (United States) Risi Competizione	(Italy) Andrea Bertolini (Italy) Fabio Babini	Maserati 6.0L V12	P	156
7	GT1	5	(United States) Pacific Coast Motorsports	(United States) Alex Figge (United Kingdom) Ryan Dalziel	Chevrolet Corvette C5-R	Y	155
7	GT1	5	(United States) Pacific Coast Motorsports	(United States) Alex Figge (United Kingdom) Ryan Dalziel	Chevrolet 7.0L V8	Y	155
8	**GT2**	**23**	**(United States) Alex Job Racing**	**(Germany) Timo Bernhard (France) Romain Dumas**	**Porsche 911 GT3-RSR**	M	**154**
8	**GT2**	**23**	**(United States) Alex Job Racing**	**(Germany) Timo Bernhard (France) Romain Dumas**	**Porsche 3.6L Flat-6**	M	**154**
9	**LMP2**	**10**	**(United States) Miracle Motorsports**	**(United States) Jeff Bucknum (United States) Chris McMurry**	**Courage C65**	K	**154**
9	**LMP2**	**10**	**(United States) Miracle Motorsports**	**(United States) Jeff Bucknum (United States) Chris McMurry**	**AER P07 2.0L Turbo I4**	K	**154**
10	GT2	31	(United States) Petersen Motorsports (United States) White Lightning Racing	(United States) Patrick Long (Germany) Jörg Bergmeister	Porsche 911 GT3-RSR	M	153
10	GT2	31	(United States) Petersen Motorsports (United States) White Lightning Racing	(United States) Patrick Long (Germany) Jörg Bergmeister	Porsche 3.6L Flat-6	M	153
11	GT2	45	(United States) Flying Lizard Motorsports	(United States) Johannes van Overbeek (United States) Jon Fogarty	Porsche 911 GT3-RSR	M	152
11	GT2	45	(United States) Flying Lizard Motorsports	(United States) Johannes van Overbeek (United States) Jon Fogarty	Porsche 3.6L FLat-6	M	152
12 DNF	LMP1	16	(United States) Dyson Racing	(United States) Butch Leitzinger (United Kingdom) James Weaver	MG-Lola EX257	M	151
12 DNF	LMP1	16	(United States) Dyson Racing	(United States) Butch Leitzinger (United Kingdom) James Weaver	MG (AER) XP20 2.0L Turbo I4	M	151
13	GT2	24	(United States) Alex Job Racing	(United States) Ian Baas (United States) Randy Pobst	Porsche 911 GT3-RSR	M	151
13	GT2	24	(United States) Alex Job Racing	(United States) Ian Baas (United States) Randy Pobst	Porsche 3.6L Flat-6	M	151
14	GT2	79	(United States) J3 Racing	(United States) Justin Jackson (United Kingdom) Tim Sugden	Porsche 911 GT3-RSR	P	150
14	GT2	79	(United States) J3 Racing	(United States) Justin Jackson (United Kingdom) Tim Sugden	Porsche 3.6L Flat-6	P	150
15	GT2	51	(United States) Panoz Motor Sports	(United States) Bryan Sellers (United Kingdom) Marino Franchitti	Panoz Esperante GT-LM	P	150
15	GT2	51	(United States) Panoz Motor Sports	(United States) Bryan Sellers (United Kingdom) Marino Franchitti	Ford (Elan) 5.0L V8	P	150
16	LMP2	19	(United States) Van der Steur Racing	(United States) Gunnar van der Steur (United Kingdom) Ben Devlin	Lola B2K/40	D	148
16	LMP2	19	(United States) Van der Steur Racing	(United States) Gunnar van der Steur (United Kingdom) Ben Devlin	AER (Nissan) 3.0L V6	D	148
17	GT2	44	(United States) Flying Lizard Motorsports	(United States) Lonnie Pechnik (United States) Seth Neiman	Porsche 911 GT3-RSR	M	148
17	GT2	44	(United States) Flying Lizard Motorsports	(United States) Lonnie Pechnik (United States) Seth Neiman	Porsche 3.6L Flat-6	M	148
18	GT2	50	(United States) Panoz Motor Sports	(United States) Bill Auberlen (United Kingdom) Robin Liddell	Panoz Esperante GT-LM	P	148
18	GT2	50	(United States) Panoz Motor Sports	(United States) Bill Auberlen (United Kingdom) Robin Liddell	Ford (Elan) 5.0L V8	P	148
19	GT2	43	(United States) BAM!	(Germany) Mike Rockenfeller (Germany) Wolf Henzler	Porsche 911 GT3-RSR	Y	141
19	GT2	43	(United States) BAM!	(Germany) Mike Rockenfeller (Germany) Wolf Henzler	Porsche 3.6L Flat-6	Y	141
20 DNF	LMP1	20	(United States) Dyson Racing	(United States) Chris Dyson (United Kingdom) Andy Wallace	MG-Lola EX257	M	121
20 DNF	LMP1	20	(United States) Dyson Racing	(United States) Chris Dyson (United Kingdom) Andy Wallace	MG (AER) XP20 2.0L Turbo I4	M	121
21	LMP2	8	(United States) B-K Motorsport	(United States) Guy Cosmo (United States) James Bach	Courage C65	G	114
21	LMP2	8	(United States) B-K Motorsport	(United States) Guy Cosmo (United States) James Bach	Mazda R20B 2.0L 3-Rotor	G	114
22 DNF	GT1	71	(United States) Carsport America	(Italy) Michele Rugolo (United States) Tom Wieckardt	Dodge Viper GTS-R	P	11
22 DNF	GT1	71	(United States) Carsport America	(Italy) Michele Rugolo (United States) Tom Wieckardt	Dodge 8.0L V10	P	11

== Statistics ==
- Pole Position - #1 ADT Champion Racing - 0:46.753
- Fastest Lap - #2 ADT Champion Racing - 0:47.787
- Distance - 254.1 miles (408.9 km)
- Average Speed - 91.953 mph (147.984 km/h)

American Le Mans Series
Previous race: 2005 American Le Mans at Mid-Ohio	2005 season	Next race: 2005 Grand Prix of Sonoma
