= 2005 Portland Grand Prix =

Portland race

Track map of Portland International Raceway

The 2005 Portland Grand Prix was the sixth race for the 2005 American Le Mans Series season held at Portland International Raceway. It took place on July 30, 2005.

== Official results ==
Class winners in bold. Cars failing to complete 70% of winner's distance marked as Not Classified (NC).

Pos	Class	No	Team	Drivers	Chassis	Tyre	Laps
Pos	Class	No	Team	Drivers	Engine	Tyre	Laps
1	**LMP1**	**2**	**(United States) ADT Champion Racing**	**(Germany) Frank Biela (Italy) Emanuele Pirro**	**Audi R8**	M	**137**
1	**LMP1**	**2**	**(United States) ADT Champion Racing**	**(Germany) Frank Biela (Italy) Emanuele Pirro**	**Audi 3.6L Turbo V8**	M	**137**
2	LMP1	20	(United States) Dyson Racing	(United States) Chris Dyson (United Kingdom) Andy Wallace	MG-Lola EX257	M	137
2	LMP1	20	(United States) Dyson Racing	(United States) Chris Dyson (United Kingdom) Andy Wallace	MG (AER) XP20 2.0L Turbo I4	M	137
3	LMP1	16	(United States) Dyson Racing	(United States) Butch Leitzinger (United Kingdom) James Weaver	MG-Lola EX257	M	136
3	LMP1	16	(United States) Dyson Racing	(United States) Butch Leitzinger (United Kingdom) James Weaver	MG (AER) XP20 2.0L Turbo I4	M	136
4	**LMP2**	**37**	**(United States) Intersport Racing**	**(United States) Clint Field (United Kingdom) Gregor Fisken**	**Lola B05/40**	G	**132**
4	**LMP2**	**37**	**(United States) Intersport Racing**	**(United States) Clint Field (United Kingdom) Gregor Fisken**	**AER P07 2.0L Turbo I4**	G	**132**
5	**GT1**	**4**	**(United States) Corvette Racing**	**(United Kingdom) Oliver Gavin (Monaco) Olivier Beretta**	**Chevrolet Corvette C6.R**	M	**131**
5	**GT1**	**4**	**(United States) Corvette Racing**	**(United Kingdom) Oliver Gavin (Monaco) Olivier Beretta**	**Chevrolet 7.0L V8**	M	**131**
6	GT1	3	(United States) Corvette Racing	(Canada) Ron Fellows (United States) Johnny O'Connell	Chevrolet Corvette C6.R	M	131
6	GT1	3	(United States) Corvette Racing	(Canada) Ron Fellows (United States) Johnny O'Connell	Chevrolet 7.0L V8	M	131
7	LMP1	12	(United States) Autocon Motorsports	(United States) Bryan Willman (United States) Michael Lewis	Riley & Scott Mk III C	D	130
7	LMP1	12	(United States) Autocon Motorsports	(United States) Bryan Willman (United States) Michael Lewis	Elan 6L8 6.0L V8	D	130
8	GT1	5	(United States) Pacific Coast Motorsports	(United States) Alex Figge (United Kingdom) Ryan Dalziel	Chevrolet Corvette C5-R	Y	130
8	GT1	5	(United States) Pacific Coast Motorsports	(United States) Alex Figge (United Kingdom) Ryan Dalziel	Chevrolet 7.0L V8	Y	130
9	GT1	35	(Italy) Maserati Corse (United States) Risi Competizione	(Italy) Fabrizio de Simone (Finland) Mika Salo	Maserati MC12	P	129
9	GT1	35	(Italy) Maserati Corse (United States) Risi Competizione	(Italy) Fabrizio de Simone (Finland) Mika Salo	Maserati 6.0L V12	P	129
10	**GT2**	**23**	**(United States) Alex Job Racing**	**(Germany) Timo Bernhard (France) Romain Dumas**	**Porsche 911 GT3-RSR**	M	**125**
10	**GT2**	**23**	**(United States) Alex Job Racing**	**(Germany) Timo Bernhard (France) Romain Dumas**	**Porsche 3.6L Flat-6**	M	**125**
11	GT2	43	(United States) BAM!	(Denmark) Martin Jensen (Germany) Wolf Henzler	Porsche 911 GT3-RSR	Y	124
11	GT2	43	(United States) BAM!	(Denmark) Martin Jensen (Germany) Wolf Henzler	Porsche 3.6L Flat-6	Y	124
12	GT2	45	(United States) Flying Lizard Motorsports	(United States) Johannes van Overbeek (United States) Jon Fogarty	Porsche 911 GT3-RSR	M	124
12	GT2	45	(United States) Flying Lizard Motorsports	(United States) Johannes van Overbeek (United States) Jon Fogarty	Porsche 3.6L Flat-6	M	124
13	GT1	71	(United States) Carsport America	(Italy) Michele Rugolo (United States) Tom Weickardt	Dodge Viper GTS-R	P	123
13	GT1	71	(United States) Carsport America	(Italy) Michele Rugolo (United States) Tom Weickardt	Dodge 8.0L V10	P	123
14	GT2	50	(United States) Panoz Motor Sports	(United States) Bryan Sellers (United Kingdom) Robin Liddell	Panoz Esperante GT-LM	P	123
14	GT2	50	(United States) Panoz Motor Sports	(United States) Bryan Sellers (United Kingdom) Robin Liddell	Ford (Elan) 5.0L V8	P	123
15	GT2	51	(United States) Panoz Motor Sports	(United Kingdom) Marino Franchitti (France) Christophe Tinseau	Panoz Esperante GT-LM	P	122
15	GT2	51	(United States) Panoz Motor Sports	(United Kingdom) Marino Franchitti (France) Christophe Tinseau	Ford (Elan) 5.0L V8	P	122
16	GT2	79	(United States) J3 Racing	(United States) Justin Jackson (United States) Michael Galati	Porsche 911 GT3-RSR	P	120
16	GT2	79	(United States) J3 Racing	(United States) Justin Jackson (United States) Michael Galati	Porsche 3.6L Flat-6	P	120
17	GT2	44	(United States) Flying Lizard Motorsports	(United States) Lonnie Pechnik (United States) Seth Neiman	Porsche 911 GT3-RSR	M	120
17	GT2	44	(United States) Flying Lizard Motorsports	(United States) Lonnie Pechnik (United States) Seth Neiman	Porsche 3.6L Flat-6	M	120
18	LMP2	8	(United States) B-K Motorsport	(United States) Guy Cosmo (United States) Jamie Bach	Courage C65	G	117
18	LMP2	8	(United States) B-K Motorsport	(United States) Guy Cosmo (United States) Jamie Bach	Mazda R20B 2.0L 3-Rotor	G	117
19	GT2	31	(United States) Petersen Motorsports (United States) White Lightning Racing	(United States) Patrick Long (Germany) Jörg Bergmeister	Porsche 911 GT3-RSR	M	113
19	GT2	31	(United States) Petersen Motorsports (United States) White Lightning Racing	(United States) Patrick Long (Germany) Jörg Bergmeister	Porsche 3.6L Flat-6	M	113
20 DNF	GT2	24	(United States) Alex Job Racing	(United States) Ian Baas (United States) Darren Law	Porsche 911 GT3-RSR	M	95
20 DNF	GT2	24	(United States) Alex Job Racing	(United States) Ian Baas (United States) Darren Law	Porsche 3.6L Flat-6	M	95
21 DNF	LMP2	10	(United States) Miracle Motorsports	(United States) Jeff Bucknum (United States) Chris McMurry	Courage C65	K	86
21 DNF	LMP2	10	(United States) Miracle Motorsports	(United States) Jeff Bucknum (United States) Chris McMurry	AER P07 2.0L Turbo I4	K	86
22 DNF	GT1	63	(United States) ACEMCO Motorsports	(United States) Terry Borcheller (United Kingdom) Johnny Mowlem	Saleen S7-R	M	48
22 DNF	GT1	63	(United States) ACEMCO Motorsports	(United States) Terry Borcheller (United Kingdom) Johnny Mowlem	Ford 7.0L V8	M	48
23 DNF	LMP1	1	(United States) ADT Champion Racing	(Germany) Marco Werner (Finland) JJ Lehto	Audi R8	M	48
23 DNF	LMP1	1	(United States) ADT Champion Racing	(Germany) Marco Werner (Finland) JJ Lehto	Audi 3.6L Turbo V8	M	48

== Statistics ==
- Pole Position - #20 Dyson Racing - 1:02.712
- Fastest Lap - #20 Dyson Racing - 1:04.271
- Distance - 269.068 miles (433.023 km)
- Average Speed - 97.78 mph (157.36 km/h)

American Le Mans Series
Previous race: 2005 Grand Prix of Sonoma	2005 season	Next race: 2005 Road America 500
