= 2002 American Le Mans Series =

32nd season of the racing series organized by IMSA

The 2002 American Le Mans Series season was the 32nd season for the IMSA GT Championship, and the fourth under the American Le Mans Series banner. It was a series for Le Mans Prototypes (LMP) and Grand Touring (GT) race cars divided into 4 classes: LMP900, LMP675, GTS, and GT. It began March 16, 2002 and ended October 12, 2002 after 10 races.

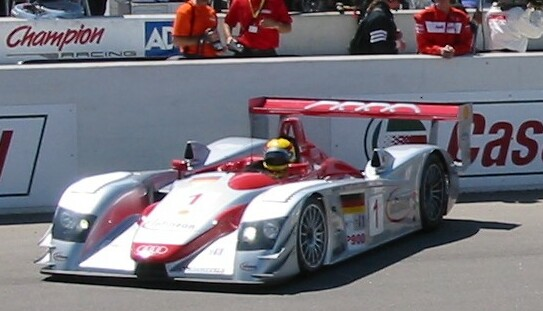
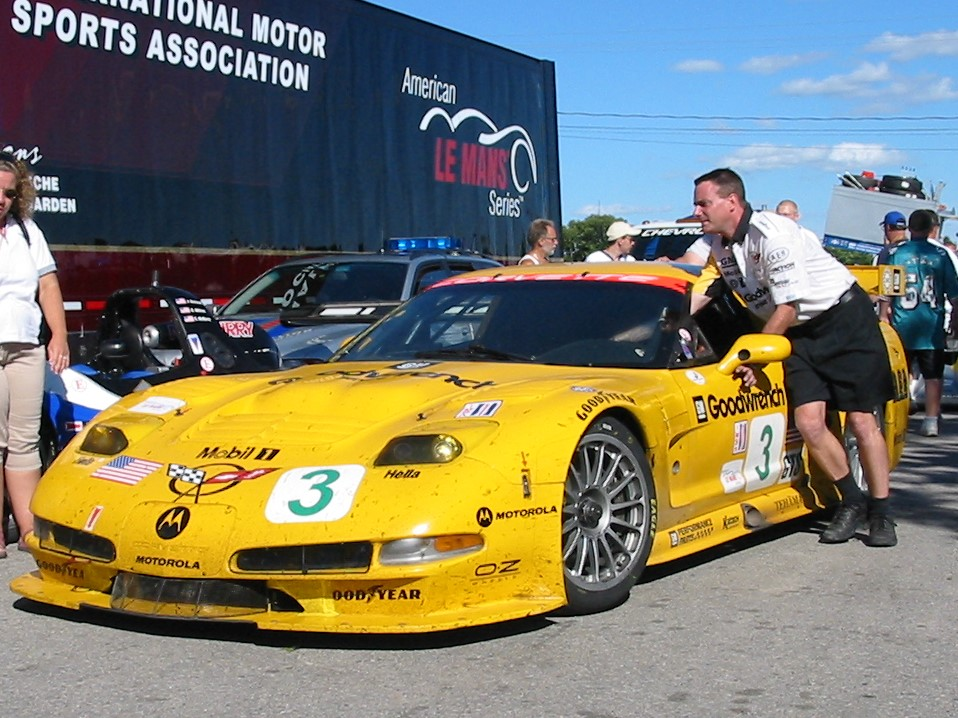
Audi Sport North America won the LMP900 championship. Corvette Racing won the GTS championship.

== Schedule ==
Rnd	Race	Length	Circuit	Location	Date
1	(United States) Mobil 1 12 Hours of Sebring	12 Hours	Sebring International Raceway	Sebring, Florida	March 16
2	(United States) Grand Prix of Sonoma	2 Hours 45 Minutes	Infineon Raceway	Sonoma, California	May 19
3	(United States) American Le Mans at Mid-Ohio	2 Hours 45 Minutes	Mid-Ohio	Lexington, Ohio	June 30
4	(United States) Road America 500	500 Miles or 4 Hours 15 Minutes	Road America	Elkhart Lake, Wisconsin	July 7
5	(United States) Grand Prix of Washington, D.C.	2 Hours 45 Minutes	RFK Stadium street circuit	Washington, D.C.	July 21
6	(Canada) Le Grand Prix de Trois-Rivières	3 Hours	Circuit Trois-Rivières	Trois-Rivières, Quebec	August 3
7	(Canada) mail2web.com Grand Prix of Mosport	2 Hours 45 Minutes	Mosport	Bowmanville, Ontario	August 18
8	(United States) Monterey Sports Car Championships	2 Hours 45 Minutes	Mazda Raceway Laguna Seca	Monterey, California	September 22
9	(United States) Cadillac American Le Mans Challenge	2 Hours 45 Minutes	Bayfront Park	Downtown, Miami, Florida	October 5
10	(United States) Audi presents Petit Le Mans	1000 Miles or 10 Hours	Road Atlanta	Braselton, Georgia	October 12

The following round was planned but later cancelled.

Race	Length	Circuit	Location	Date
(Malaysia) Le Mans Series Race of Champions	6 Hours	Sepang International Circuit	Sepang, Selangor	January 13/November 3

Following the demise of the European Le Mans Series, the two European rounds were dropped from the calendar. There had still been plans for a race of Champions held at Sepang in Malaysia, but this was cancelled. The Series would only race in North America going forward.

The biggest new race was the Grand Prix of Washington, held on a 1.7-mile temporary road racing circuit at the Robert F Kennedy Memorial Stadium on a 10-year contract. Miami would hold an endurance race for the first time since 1993, with the American Le Mans Challenge. A second Canadian race would be held after the Circuit Trois-Rivières switched from the Grand-Am series to ALMS for 2002. The Road America 500 would also switch to ALMS for the 2002 season. The Portland International Raceway and Texas Motor Speedway did not return, leaving the ALMS without any road course ovals on the schedule.

== Entry list ==
=== Le Mans Prototype 900 (LMP900) ===
Team	Chassis	Engine	Tyre	No.	Drivers	Rnds.
(United States) Gunnar Racing	Panoz LMP-1 Roadster-S	Élan 6L8 6.0 L V8	G	00	(United States) Gunnar Jeannette	1
(United States) Gunnar Racing	Panoz LMP-1 Roadster-S	Élan 6L8 6.0 L V8	G	00	(United States) Chad Block	1
(United States) Gunnar Racing	Panoz LMP-1 Roadster-S	Élan 6L8 6.0 L V8	G	00	(United States) Wayne Johnson	1
(Germany) Audi Sport North America	Audi R8	Audi 3.6 L Turbo V8	M	1	(Italy) Emanuele Pirro	1, 3–10
(Germany) Audi Sport North America	Audi R8	Audi 3.6 L Turbo V8	M	1	(Germany) Frank Biela	1, 3–10
(Germany) Audi Sport North America	Audi R8	Audi 3.6 L Turbo V8	M	1	(Denmark) Tom Kristensen	1
(Germany) Audi Sport North America	Audi R8	Audi 3.6 L Turbo V8	M	2	(Italy) Rinaldo Capello	All
(Germany) Audi Sport North America	Audi R8	Audi 3.6 L Turbo V8	M	2	(Italy) Christian Pescatori	1
(Germany) Audi Sport North America	Audi R8	Audi 3.6 L Turbo V8	M	2	(United Kingdom) Johnny Herbert	1
(Germany) Audi Sport North America	Audi R8	Audi 3.6 L Turbo V8	M	2	(Germany) Frank Biela	2
(Germany) Audi Sport North America	Audi R8	Audi 3.6 L Turbo V8	M	2	(Italy) Emanuele Pirro	2
(Germany) Audi Sport North America	Audi R8	Audi 3.6 L Turbo V8	M	2	(Denmark) Tom Kristensen	3–10
(United States) Team Cadillac	Cadillac Northstar LMP02	Cadillac Northstar 4.0 L Turbo V8	M	7	(France) Emmanuel Collard	1, 5, 7–10
(United States) Team Cadillac	Cadillac Northstar LMP02	Cadillac Northstar 4.0 L Turbo V8	M	7	(France) Éric Bernard	1, 5, 7–10
(United States) Team Cadillac	Cadillac Northstar LMP02	Cadillac Northstar 4.0 L Turbo V8	M	7	(Finland) J.J. Lehto	1
(United States) Team Cadillac	Cadillac Northstar LMP02	Cadillac Northstar 4.0 L Turbo V8	M	7	(South Africa) Wayne Taylor	10
(United States) Team Cadillac	Cadillac Northstar LMP02	Cadillac Northstar 4.0 L Turbo V8	M	8	(Italy) Max Angelelli	1, 5, 7–10
(United States) Team Cadillac	Cadillac Northstar LMP02	Cadillac Northstar 4.0 L Turbo V8	M	8	(South Africa) Wayne Taylor	1, 5
(United States) Team Cadillac	Cadillac Northstar LMP02	Cadillac Northstar 4.0 L Turbo V8	M	8	(France) Christophe Tinseau	1, 10
(United States) Team Cadillac	Cadillac Northstar LMP02	Cadillac Northstar 4.0 L Turbo V8	M	8	(Finland) J.J. Lehto	7–10
(United States) Dyson Racing Team	Riley & Scott Mk III	Lincoln (Élan) 6L8 6.0 L V8	G	16	(United Kingdom) James Weaver	1–3, 5–6
(United States) Dyson Racing Team	Riley & Scott Mk III	Lincoln (Élan) 6L8 6.0 L V8	G	16	(United States) Butch Leitzinger	1, 3
(United States) Dyson Racing Team	Riley & Scott Mk III	Lincoln (Élan) 6L8 6.0 L V8	G	16	(United States) Elliot Forbes-Robinson	1
(United States) Dyson Racing Team	Riley & Scott Mk III	Lincoln (Élan) 6L8 6.0 L V8	G	16	(United States) Chris Dyson	2, 5–6
(United States) Dyson Racing Team	Riley & Scott Mk III	Lincoln (Élan) 6L8 6.0 L V8	G	20	(United States) Dorsey Schroeder	1
(United States) Dyson Racing Team	Riley & Scott Mk III	Lincoln (Élan) 6L8 6.0 L V8	G	20	(United States) Chris Dyson	1
(United States) Dyson Racing Team	Riley & Scott Mk III	Lincoln (Élan) 6L8 6.0 L V8	G	20	(United States) Rob Dyson	1
(United States) MBD Sportscar	Panoz LMP07	Mugen MF408S 4.0 L V8	G	17	(Canada) Scott Maxwell	1–4
(United States) MBD Sportscar	Panoz LMP07	Mugen MF408S 4.0 L V8	G	17	(Venezuela) Milka Duno	1–4
(United States) MBD Sportscar	Panoz LMP07	Mugen MF408S 4.0 L V8	G	17	(Canada) John Graham	1
(United States) MBD Sportscar	Panoz LMP07	Mugen MF408S 4.0 L V8	G	18	(Belgium) Didier de Radigues	1–4
(United States) MBD Sportscar	Panoz LMP07	Mugen MF408S 4.0 L V8	G	18	(Belgium) Bruno Lambert	1
(United States) MBD Sportscar	Panoz LMP07	Mugen MF408S 4.0 L V8	G	18	(United States) Rick Sutherland	1
(United States) MBD Sportscar	Panoz LMP07	Mugen MF408S 4.0 L V8	G	18	(Canada) John Graham	2–4
(United Kingdom) Team Ascari	Ascari KZR-1	Judd GV4 4.0 L V10	G	19	(South Africa) Werner Lupberger	1
(United Kingdom) Team Ascari	Ascari KZR-1	Judd GV4 4.0 L V10	G	19	(United States) Timothy Bell	1
(United Kingdom) Team Ascari	Ascari KZR-1	Judd GV4 4.0 L V10	G	19	(Denmark) Kristian Kolby	1
(United Kingdom) Team Ascari	Ascari KZR-1	Judd GV4 4.0 L V10	G	21	(United Kingdom) Ben Collins	1
(United Kingdom) Team Ascari	Ascari KZR-1	Judd GV4 4.0 L V10	G	21	(United Kingdom) Christian Vann	1
(United Kingdom) Team Ascari	Ascari KZR-1	Judd GV4 4.0 L V10	G	21	(United Kingdom) Justin Wilson	1
(United States) Doran Lista Racing	Dallara SP1	Judd GV4 4.0 L V10	Y	27	(Belgium) Didier Theys	1
(United States) Doran Lista Racing	Dallara SP1	Judd GV4 4.0 L V10	Y	27	(Switzerland) Fredy Lienhard	1
(United States) Doran Lista Racing	Dallara SP1	Judd GV4 4.0 L V10	Y	27	(Italy) Mauro Baldi	1
(United Kingdom) Chamberlain	Dome S101	Judd GV4 4.0 L V10	G	27	(United Kingdom) Christian Vann	8–10
(United Kingdom) Chamberlain	Dome S101	Judd GV4 4.0 L V10	G	27	(Venezuela) Milka Duno	8–10
(United Kingdom) Chamberlain	Dome S101	Judd GV4 4.0 L V10	G	27	(France) Xavier Pompidou	10
(United States) Intersport Racing	Lola B2K/10B	Judd GV4 4.0 L V10	G	30	(United States) Mark Neuhaus	1–3, 7–10
(United States) Intersport Racing	Lola B2K/10B	Judd GV4 4.0 L V10	G	30	(United States) John Macaluso	1, 6
(United States) Intersport Racing	Lola B2K/10B	Judd GV4 4.0 L V10	G	30	(United States) Butch Brickell	1
(United States) Intersport Racing	Lola B2K/10B	Judd GV4 4.0 L V10	G	30	(United States) Clint Field	2–4, 7–10
(United States) Intersport Racing	Lola B2K/10B	Judd GV4 4.0 L V10	G	30	(United States) Joel Field	4
(United States) Intersport Racing	Lola B2K/10B	Judd GV4 4.0 L V10	G	30	(United States) Andy Lally	5–6
(United States) Intersport Racing	Lola B2K/10B	Judd GV4 4.0 L V10	G	30	(Venezuela) Milka Duno	5
(United States) Intersport Racing	Lola B2K/10B	Judd GV4 4.0 L V10	G	30	(United States) John Miller	10
(United States) Riley & Scott Racing	Riley & Scott Mk III C	Élan 6L8 6.0 L V8	G	36	(Belgium) Marc Goossens	1, 9–10
(United States) Riley & Scott Racing	Riley & Scott Mk III C	Élan 6L8 6.0 L V8	G	36	(United States) Jim Matthews	1
(United States) Riley & Scott Racing	Riley & Scott Mk III C	Élan 6L8 6.0 L V8	G	36	(United Kingdom) Guy Smith	1
(United States) Riley & Scott Racing	Riley & Scott Mk III C	Élan 6L8 6.0 L V8	G	36	(United States) Tony Ave	9–10
(United States) Champion Racing	Audi R8	Audi 3.6 L Turbo V8	M	38	(Sweden) Stefan Johansson	1, 3–10
(United States) Champion Racing	Audi R8	Audi 3.6 L Turbo V8	M	38	(United Kingdom) Andy Wallace	1
(United States) Champion Racing	Audi R8	Audi 3.6 L Turbo V8	M	38	(Netherlands) Jan Lammers	1
(United States) Champion Racing	Audi R8	Audi 3.6 L Turbo V8	M	38	(United Kingdom) Johnny Herbert	2–10
(United States) Champion Racing	Audi R8	Audi 3.6 L Turbo V8	M	38	(Denmark) Tom Kristensen	2
(United States) Panoz Motor Sports	Panoz LMP-1 Roadster-S	Élan 6L8 6.0 L V8	M	49	(United States) Gunnar Jeannette	2
(United States) Panoz Motor Sports	Panoz LMP-1 Roadster-S	Élan 6L8 6.0 L V8	M	49	(United States) David Donohue	2
(United States) Panoz Motor Sports	Panoz LMP01 Evo	Élan 6L8 6.0 L V8	M	50	(Australia) David Brabham	All
(United States) Panoz Motor Sports	Panoz LMP01 Evo	Élan 6L8 6.0 L V8	M	50	(Denmark) Jan Magnussen	All
(United States) Panoz Motor Sports	Panoz LMP01 Evo	Élan 6L8 6.0 L V8	M	50	(Belgium) Eric van de Poele	1
(United States) Panoz Motor Sports	Panoz LMP01 Evo	Élan 6L8 6.0 L V8	M	50	(United States) David Donohue	10
(United States) Panoz Motor Sports	Panoz LMP01 Evo	Élan 6L8 6.0 L V8	M	51	(United States) Bryan Herta	All
(United States) Panoz Motor Sports	Panoz LMP01 Evo	Élan 6L8 6.0 L V8	M	51	(United States) Bill Auberlen	All
(United States) Panoz Motor Sports	Panoz LMP01 Evo	Élan 6L8 6.0 L V8	M	51	(United States) David Donohue	1
(United States) Panoz Motor Sports	Panoz LMP01 Evo	Élan 6L8 6.0 L V8	M	51	(United States) Gunnar Jeannette	10
(United States) Sezio Florida Racing Team	Norma M2000	Ford (Kinetic) 6.0 L V8	P	87	(United States) John Mirro	1
(United States) Sezio Florida Racing Team	Norma M2000	Ford (Kinetic) 6.0 L V8	P	87	(France) Georges Forgeois	1
(United States) Sezio Florida Racing Team	Norma M2000	Ford (Kinetic) 6.0 L V8	P	87	(France) François O'Born	1

=== Le Mans Prototype 675 (LMP675) ===
Team	Chassis	Engine	Tyre	No.	Drivers	Rnds.
(United States) KnightHawk Racing, LLC	MG-Lola EX257	MG (AER) XP20 2.0 L Turbo I4	A	11	(United States) Steven Knight	1–8, 10
(United States) KnightHawk Racing, LLC	MG-Lola EX257	MG (AER) XP20 2.0 L Turbo I4	A	11	(United States) Andy Lally	1, 10
(United States) KnightHawk Racing, LLC	MG-Lola EX257	MG (AER) XP20 2.0 L Turbo I4	A	11	(United Kingdom) Jonny Kane	1
(United States) KnightHawk Racing, LLC	MG-Lola EX257	MG (AER) XP20 2.0 L Turbo I4	A	11	(United States) Chad Block	2, 4–6, 8–10
(United States) KnightHawk Racing, LLC	MG-Lola EX257	MG (AER) XP20 2.0 L Turbo I4	A	11	(United States) John Fergus	3
(United States) KnightHawk Racing, LLC	MG-Lola EX257	MG (AER) XP20 2.0 L Turbo I4	A	11	(United States) Mel Hawkins	4
(United States) KnightHawk Racing, LLC	MG-Lola EX257	MG (AER) XP20 2.0 L Turbo I4	A	11	(Germany) Claudia Hürtgen	7–9
(United States) Archangel Motorsports	Lola B2K/40	Ford (Millington) 2.0 L Turbo I4	D	13	(United Kingdom) Ben Devlin	2–10
(United States) Archangel Motorsports	Lola B2K/40	Ford (Millington) 2.0 L Turbo I4	D	13	(United States) Dave McEntee	2
(United States) Archangel Motorsports	Lola B2K/40	Ford (Millington) 2.0 L Turbo I4	D	13	(United States) Bret Arsenault	3, 9
(United States) Archangel Motorsports	Lola B2K/40	Ford (Millington) 2.0 L Turbo I4	D	13	(United States) Peter MacLeod	4
(United States) Archangel Motorsports	Lola B2K/40	Ford (Millington) 2.0 L Turbo I4	D	13	(United States) Larry Oberto	4
(United States) Archangel Motorsports	Lola B2K/40	Ford (Millington) 2.0 L Turbo I4	D	13	(United States) Will Langhorne	5
(United States) Archangel Motorsports	Lola B2K/40	Ford (Millington) 2.0 L Turbo I4	D	13	(Canada) Marc-Antoine Camirand	6–7
(United States) Archangel Motorsports	Lola B2K/40	Ford (Millington) 2.0 L Turbo I4	D	13	(United States) David Sterenberg	7
(United States) Archangel Motorsports	Lola B2K/40	Ford (Millington) 2.0 L Turbo I4	D	13	(United States) Andy Lally	8
(United States) Archangel Motorsports	Lola B2K/40	Ford (Millington) 2.0 L Turbo I4	D	13	(United States) Jason Workman	10
(United States) Archangel Motorsports	Lola B2K/40	Ford (Millington) 2.0 L Turbo I4	D	13	(France) Georges Forgeois	10
(United States) Archangel Motorsports	Reynard 01Q	Ford (Nicholson-McLaren) 3.3 L V8	D	74	(South Africa) Earl Goddard	10
(United States) Archangel Motorsports	Reynard 01Q	Ford (Nicholson-McLaren) 3.3 L V8	D	74	(United States) John Mefford	10
(United States) Archangel Motorsports	Reynard 01Q	Ford (Nicholson-McLaren) 3.3 L V8	D	74	(United States) Andrew Davis	10
(United Kingdom) R.N. Motorsports, Ltd.	Reynard 02S	Zytek ZG348 3.4 L V8	D	15	(Denmark) John Nielsen	10
(United Kingdom) R.N. Motorsports, Ltd.	Reynard 02S	Zytek ZG348 3.4 L V8	D	15	(Denmark) Casper Elgaard	10
(United States) Dyson Racing Team	MG-Lola EX257	MG (AER) XP20 2.0 L Turbo I4	G	16	(United Kingdom) James Weaver	7–10
(United States) Dyson Racing Team	MG-Lola EX257	MG (AER) XP20 2.0 L Turbo I4	G	16	(United States) Butch Leitzinger	7–10
(United States) Dyson Racing Team	MG-Lola EX257	MG (AER) XP20 2.0 L Turbo I4	G	16	(United Kingdom) Andy Wallace	10
(United States) Essex Racing	Lola B2K/40	Nissan (AER) VQL 3.0 L V6	D	19	(Canada) Melanie Paterson	6–7
(United States) Essex Racing	Lola B2K/40	Nissan (AER) VQL 3.0 L V6	D	19	(Canada) Paul Fix	6
(United States) Essex Racing	Lola B2K/40	Nissan (AER) VQL 3.0 L V6	D	19	(Canada) Ross Bentley	7
(Japan) AutoExe Motorsports	AutoExe (WR) LMP-02	Mazda R26B 2.6 L 4-Rotor	D	24	(Japan) Yojiro Terada	1, 10
(Japan) AutoExe Motorsports	AutoExe (WR) LMP-02	Mazda R26B 2.6 L 4-Rotor	D	24	(United States) Jim Downing	1, 10
(Japan) AutoExe Motorsports	AutoExe (WR) LMP-02	Mazda R26B 2.6 L 4-Rotor	D	24	(United States) John Fergus	1
(Japan) AutoExe Motorsports	AutoExe (WR) LMP-02	Mazda R26B 2.6 L 4-Rotor	D	24	(France) Stéphane Daoudi	10
(France) Welter Racing	WR LMP02	Peugeot 2.0 L Turbo I4	M	28	(France) Stéphane Daoudi	1
(France) Welter Racing	WR LMP02	Peugeot 2.0 L Turbo I4	M	28	(France) Jean-René de Fournoux	1
(France) Welter Racing	WR LMP02	Peugeot 2.0 L Turbo I4	M	28	(United States) A.J. Smith	1
(United States) Intersport Racing	MG-Lola EX257	MG (AER) XP20 2.0 L Turbo I4	G	30	(United States) Jon Field	All
(United States) Intersport Racing	MG-Lola EX257	MG (AER) XP20 2.0 L Turbo I4	G	30	(United States) Mike Durand	1, 4, 7, 9–10
(United States) Intersport Racing	MG-Lola EX257	MG (AER) XP20 2.0 L Turbo I4	G	30	(United States) Duncan Dayton	1, 10
(United States) Intersport Racing	MG-Lola EX257	MG (AER) XP20 2.0 L Turbo I4	G	30	(United States) Rick Sutherland	2, 8
(United States) Intersport Racing	MG-Lola EX257	MG (AER) XP20 2.0 L Turbo I4	G	30	(United States) Clint Field	3, 5–6
(France) ROC	Reynard 2KQ-LM	Volkswagen HPT 2.0 L Turbo I4	M	40	(United States) Ryan Jones	1
(France) ROC	Reynard 2KQ-LM	Volkswagen HPT 2.0 L Turbo I4	M	40	(United States) Jeff Jones	1
(France) ROC	Reynard 2KQ-LM	Volkswagen HPT 2.0 L Turbo I4	M	40	(United States) Jeffrey Jones	1
(France) Noël del Bello Racing	Reynard 2KQ-LM	Volkswagen HPT 2.0 L Turbo I4	M	41	(Switzerland) Jean-Denis Délétraz	1
(France) Noël del Bello Racing	Reynard 2KQ-LM	Volkswagen HPT 2.0 L Turbo I4	M	41	(United Kingdom) Mark Smithson	1
(France) Noël del Bello Racing	Reynard 2KQ-LM	Volkswagen HPT 2.0 L Turbo I4	M	41	(Switzerland) Christophe Pillon	1
(United States) Team Bucknum Racing	Pilbeam MP84	Nissan (AER) VQL 3.0 L V6	A	55	(United States) Chris McMurry	1–2
(United States) Team Bucknum Racing	Pilbeam MP84	Nissan (AER) VQL 3.0 L V6	A	55	(United States) Bryan Willman	1–2
(United States) Team Bucknum Racing	Pilbeam MP84	Nissan (AER) VQL 3.0 L V6	A	55	(Germany) Pierre Ehret	1, 8, 10
(United States) Team Bucknum Racing	Pilbeam MP84	Nissan (AER) VQL 3.0 L V6	A	55	(United States) Bret Arsenault	8
(United States) Team Bucknum Racing	Pilbeam MP84	Nissan (AER) VQL 3.0 L V6	A	55	(Canada) Melanie Paterson	10
(United States) Team Bucknum Racing	Pilbeam MP84	Nissan (AER) VQL 3.0 L V6	A	55	(United States) John Olsen	10
(United States) Team Bucknum Racing	Pilbeam MP84	Nissan (AER) VQL 3.0 L V6	A	56	(United States) Jeff Bucknum	All
(United States) Team Bucknum Racing	Pilbeam MP84	Nissan (AER) VQL 3.0 L V6	A	56	(United States) Dick Downs	1
(United States) Team Bucknum Racing	Pilbeam MP84	Nissan (AER) VQL 3.0 L V6	A	56	(United States) Allan Ziegelman	1
(United States) Team Bucknum Racing	Pilbeam MP84	Nissan (AER) VQL 3.0 L V6	A	56	(Belgium) Bruno Lambert	2
(United States) Team Bucknum Racing	Pilbeam MP84	Nissan (AER) VQL 3.0 L V6	A	56	(United States) Chris McMurry	3–10
(United States) Team Bucknum Racing	Pilbeam MP84	Nissan (AER) VQL 3.0 L V6	A	56	(United States) Bryan Willman	3–10
(United States) Team Spencer Motorsports	Lola B2K/40	Mazda 1.3 L Turbo 2-Rotor	A	62	(United States) Rich Grupp	1–4, 8, 10
(United States) Team Spencer Motorsports	Lola B2K/40	Mazda 1.3 L Turbo 2-Rotor	A	62	(United States) Ryan Hampton	1–2, 8, 10
(United States) Team Spencer Motorsports	Lola B2K/40	Mazda 1.3 L Turbo 2-Rotor	A	62	(United States) Dennis Spencer	1, 3–4, 8, 10
(Canada) Kyser Racing	Lola B2K/40	Nissan (AER) VQL 3.0 L V6	D	69	(Canada) Kyle Wankum	1
(Canada) Kyser Racing	Lola B2K/40	Nissan (AER) VQL 3.0 L V6	D	69	(United States) Joe Foster	1
(Canada) Kyser Racing	Lola B2K/40	Nissan (AER) VQL 3.0 L V6	D	69	(United States) Doc Bundy	1
(United States) AB Motorsport	Pilbeam MP84	Nissan (AER) VQL 3.0 L V6	A	77	(United States) Jimmy Adams	3–5, 9
(United States) AB Motorsport	Pilbeam MP84	Nissan (AER) VQL 3.0 L V6	A	77	(United States) Joe Blacker	3–5, 9
(United States) AB Motorsport	Pilbeam MP84	Nissan (AER) VQL 3.0 L V6	A	77	(United States) John Burke	4
(United States) AB Motorsport	Pilbeam MP84	Nissan (AER) VQL 3.0 L V6	A	77	(United States) Orlam Sonora	9
(Canada) Porschehaus Racing	Lola B2K/40	Nissan (AER) VQL 3.0 L V6	D	89	(Canada) Stephane Veilleux	1
(Canada) Porschehaus Racing	Lola B2K/40	Nissan (AER) VQL 3.0 L V6	D	89	(Canada) Robert Julien	1
(Canada) Porschehaus Racing	Lola B2K/40	Nissan (AER) VQL 3.0 L V6	D	89	(United States) Adam Merzon	1

=== Grand Touring Sport (GTS) ===
Team	Chassis	Engine	Tyre	No.	Drivers	Rnds.
(Italy) Team Olive Garden	Ferrari 550 Maranello	Ferrari F133 A 6.0 L V12	M	0	(Italy) Mimmo Schiattarella	All
(Italy) Team Olive Garden	Ferrari 550 Maranello	Ferrari F133 A 6.0 L V12	M	0	(Italy) Emanuele Naspetti	All
(Italy) Team Olive Garden	Ferrari 550 Maranello	Ferrari F133 A 6.0 L V12	M	0	(Venezuela) Johnny Cecotto	1
(Italy) Team Olive Garden	Ferrari 550 Maranello	Ferrari F133 A 6.0 L V12	M	0	(Italy) Max Papis	10
(United States) Corvette Racing	Chevrolet Corvette C5-R	Chevrolet LS1.R 7.0 L V8	G	3	(Canada) Ron Fellows	All
(United States) Corvette Racing	Chevrolet Corvette C5-R	Chevrolet LS1.R 7.0 L V8	G	3	(United States) Johnny O'Connell	All
(United States) Corvette Racing	Chevrolet Corvette C5-R	Chevrolet LS1.R 7.0 L V8	G	3	(United Kingdom) Oliver Gavin	1, 10
(United States) Corvette Racing	Chevrolet Corvette C5-R	Chevrolet LS1.R 7.0 L V8	G	4	(United States) Andy Pilgrim	All
(United States) Corvette Racing	Chevrolet Corvette C5-R	Chevrolet LS1.R 7.0 L V8	G	4	(United States) Kelly Collins	All
(United States) Corvette Racing	Chevrolet Corvette C5-R	Chevrolet LS1.R 7.0 L V8	G	4	(France) Franck Fréon	1, 10
(United States) Park Place Racing	Saleen S7-R	Ford Windsor 7.0 L V8	Y	5	(United States) Chris Bingham	1
(United States) Park Place Racing	Saleen S7-R	Ford Windsor 7.0 L V8	Y	5	(United States) Vic Rice	1
(United States) Park Place Racing	Saleen S7-R	Ford Windsor 7.0 L V8	Y	5	(United States) Peter MacLeod	1
(Germany) Konrad Motorsport	Saleen S7-R	Ford Windsor 7.0 L V8	P	25	(United States) Charles Slater	1, 9–10
(Germany) Konrad Motorsport	Saleen S7-R	Ford Windsor 7.0 L V8	P	25	(United Kingdom) Gavin Pickering	1
(Germany) Konrad Motorsport	Saleen S7-R	Ford Windsor 7.0 L V8	P	25	(Switzerland) Walter Brun	1
(Germany) Konrad Motorsport	Saleen S7-R	Ford Windsor 7.0 L V8	P	25	(United States) Sean Murphy	9–10
(Germany) Konrad Motorsport	Saleen S7-R	Ford Windsor 7.0 L V8	P	25	(France) Jean-François Yvon	10
(Germany) Konrad Motorsport	Saleen S7-R	Ford Windsor 7.0 L V8	P	26	(United States) Terry Borcheller	All
(Germany) Konrad Motorsport	Saleen S7-R	Ford Windsor 7.0 L V8	P	26	(Austria) Franz Konrad	All
(Germany) Konrad Motorsport	Saleen S7-R	Ford Windsor 7.0 L V8	P	26	(Switzerland) Toni Seiler	1, 9–10
(United Kingdom) Prodrive	Ferrari 550-GTS Maranello	Ferrari F133 A 6.0 L V12	M	33 77	(Czech Republic) Tomáš Enge	1, 8–10
(United Kingdom) Prodrive	Ferrari 550-GTS Maranello	Ferrari F133 A 6.0 L V12	M	33 77	(Switzerland) Alain Menu	1, 10
(United Kingdom) Prodrive	Ferrari 550-GTS Maranello	Ferrari F133 A 6.0 L V12	M	33 77	(Sweden) Rickard Rydell	1
(United Kingdom) Prodrive	Ferrari 550-GTS Maranello	Ferrari F133 A 6.0 L V12	M	33 77	(Netherlands) Peter Kox	8–10
(United States) American Viperacing	Dodge Viper GTS-R	Dodge EWB 8.0 L V10	P	44	(United States) Tom Weickardt	All
(United States) American Viperacing	Dodge Viper GTS-R	Dodge EWB 8.0 L V10	P	44	(United States) Marc Bunting	1–4
(United States) American Viperacing	Dodge Viper GTS-R	Dodge EWB 8.0 L V10	P	44	(United States) Simon Gregg	1
(United States) American Viperacing	Dodge Viper GTS-R	Dodge EWB 8.0 L V10	P	44	(United States) Tom Grunnah	4
(United States) American Viperacing	Dodge Viper GTS-R	Dodge EWB 8.0 L V10	P	44	(United Kingdom) Marino Franchitti	5
(United States) American Viperacing	Dodge Viper GTS-R	Dodge EWB 8.0 L V10	P	44	(United States) Kevin Allen	6–7
(United States) American Viperacing	Dodge Viper GTS-R	Dodge EWB 8.0 L V10	P	44	(United States) Jeff Altenburg	8–9
(United States) American Viperacing	Dodge Viper GTS-R	Dodge EWB 8.0 L V10	P	44	(France) Jean-Philippe Belloc	10
(United States) American Viperacing	Dodge Viper GTS-R	Dodge EWB 8.0 L V10	P	45	(United States) Shane Lewis	1–5
(United States) American Viperacing	Dodge Viper GTS-R	Dodge EWB 8.0 L V10	P	45	(United States) Norman Goldrich	1
(United States) American Viperacing	Dodge Viper GTS-R	Dodge EWB 8.0 L V10	P	45	(United States) Rick Fairbanks	1
(United States) American Viperacing	Dodge Viper GTS-R	Dodge EWB 8.0 L V10	P	45	(United States) Spencer Trenery	2
(United States) American Viperacing	Dodge Viper GTS-R	Dodge EWB 8.0 L V10	P	45	(United States) Kevin Allen	3
(United States) American Viperacing	Dodge Viper GTS-R	Dodge EWB 8.0 L V10	P	45	(Italy) Gianni Morbidelli	4
(United States) American Viperacing	Dodge Viper GTS-R	Dodge EWB 8.0 L V10	P	45	(United States) Marc Bunting	5–9
(United States) American Viperacing	Dodge Viper GTS-R	Dodge EWB 8.0 L V10	P	45	(United Kingdom) Marino Franchitti	6–10
(United States) American Viperacing	Dodge Viper GTS-R	Dodge EWB 8.0 L V10	P	45	(Netherlands) Mike Hezemans	10
(United States) American Viperacing	Dodge Viper GTS-R	Dodge EWB 8.0 L V10	P	45	(Italy) Fabio Babini	10
(Netherlands) Team Carsport Holland	Chrysler Viper GTS-R	Dodge EWB 8.0 L V10	P	46	(Netherlands) Mike Hezemans	1
(Netherlands) Team Carsport Holland	Chrysler Viper GTS-R	Dodge EWB 8.0 L V10	P	46	(Belgium) Anthony Kumpen	1
(Netherlands) Team Carsport Holland	Chrysler Viper GTS-R	Dodge EWB 8.0 L V10	P	46	(Italy) Luca Cappellari	1
(United Kingdom) Brookspeed	Chrysler Viper GTS-R	Dodge EWB 8.0 L V10	G	48	(United Kingdom) Grahame Bryant	1*
(United Kingdom) Graham Nash Motorsport	Saleen S7-R	Ford Windsor 7.0 L V8	P	83	(Brazil) Thomas Erdos	1
(United Kingdom) Graham Nash Motorsport	Saleen S7-R	Ford Windsor 7.0 L V8	P	83	(United Kingdom) Ian McKellar	1
(United Kingdom) Graham Nash Motorsport	Saleen S7-R	Ford Windsor 7.0 L V8	P	83	(United States) Ron Johnson	1
(United Kingdom) Graham Nash Motorsport	Saleen S7-R	Ford Windsor 7.0 L V8	P	83	(United States) Shane Lewis	9
(United Kingdom) Graham Nash Motorsport	Saleen S7-R	Ford Windsor 7.0 L V8	P	83	(United States) Regan Morgan	9
(United Kingdom) Graham Nash Motorsport	Saleen S7-R	Ford Windsor 7.0 L V8	P	83	(United States) Vic Rice	10
(United Kingdom) Graham Nash Motorsport	Saleen S7-R	Ford Windsor 7.0 L V8	P	83	(United Kingdom) Shaun Balfe	10
(United Kingdom) Graham Nash Motorsport	Saleen S7-R	Ford Windsor 7.0 L V8	P	83	(United Kingdom) Mike Newton	10
(United Kingdom) Graham Nash Motorsport	Saleen S7-R	Ford Windsor 7.0 L V8	P	84	(Brazil) Thomas Erdos	9–10
(United Kingdom) Graham Nash Motorsport	Saleen S7-R	Ford Windsor 7.0 L V8	P	84	(Portugal) Pedro Chaves	9
(United Kingdom) Graham Nash Motorsport	Saleen S7-R	Ford Windsor 7.0 L V8	P	84	(United Kingdom) Robin Liddell	10
(United Kingdom) Graham Nash Motorsport	Saleen S7-R	Ford Windsor 7.0 L V8	P	84	(United Kingdom) Rob Barff	10
(France) Larbre Competition Chereau	Chrysler Viper GTS-R	Dodge EWB 8.0 L V10	M	86	(France) Christophe Bouchut	1
(France) Larbre Competition Chereau	Chrysler Viper GTS-R	Dodge EWB 8.0 L V10	M	86	(Belgium) Vincent Vosse	1

=== Grand Touring (GT) ===
Team	Chassis	Engine	Tyre	No.	Drivers	Rnds.
(Spain) Paco Orti Racing	Porsche 996 GT3-R	Porsche M96/77 3.6 L Flat-6	D	04	(Spain) Paco Orti	10*
(Spain) Paco Orti Racing	Porsche 996 GT3-R	Porsche M96/77 3.6 L Flat-6	D	04	(United States) Cougar Jacobsen	10*
(Spain) Paco Orti Racing	Porsche 996 GT3-R	Porsche M96/77 3.6 L Flat-6	D	04	(Germany) Wolfgang Kaufmann	10*
(United States) Front Porch Racing, Inc.	Porsche 996 GT3-R	Porsche M96/77 3.6 L Flat-6	P	07	(United States) Cory Friedman	5
(United States) Front Porch Racing, Inc.	Porsche 996 GT3-R	Porsche M96/77 3.6 L Flat-6	P	07	(United States) Thomas Soriano	5
(United States) Front Porch Racing, Inc.	Porsche 996 GT3-R	Porsche M96/77 3.6 L Flat-6	P	07	(United States) Dan Arkins	5
(United States) Alegra Motorsports	BMW M3 E46	BMW S54 3.2 L I6	Y	10	(United States) Chris Gleason	5–6, 9–10
(United States) Alegra Motorsports	BMW M3 E46	BMW S54 3.2 L I6	Y	10	(United States) Emil Assentato	5–6, 9–10
(United States) Alegra Motorsports	BMW M3 E46	BMW S54 3.2 L I6	Y	10	(United States) Nick Longhi	10
(United States) Alegra Motorsports	BMW M3 E46	BMW S54 3.2 L I6	Y	40	(United States) Carlos DeQuesada	5–6, 9–10
(United States) Alegra Motorsports	BMW M3 E46	BMW S54 3.2 L I6	Y	40	(United States) Scooter Gabel	5–6, 9–10
(United States) Alegra Motorsports	BMW M3 E46	BMW S54 3.2 L I6	Y	40	(United States) Boris Said	10
(Netherlands) Spyker Squadron	Spyker C8 Double-12R	BMW (Mader) 4.0 L V8	D	12	(Netherlands) Peter Kox	1
(Netherlands) Spyker Squadron	Spyker C8 Double-12R	BMW (Mader) 4.0 L V8	D	12	(Netherlands) Hans Hugenholtz	1
(Netherlands) Spyker Squadron	Spyker C8 Double-12R	BMW (Mader) 4.0 L V8	D	12	(United States) Derek Hill	1
(United States) MCR	Porsche 996 GT3-RS	Porsche M96/77 3.6 L Flat-6	?	12	(United States) Vic Rice	10*
(United States) MCR	Porsche 996 GT3-RS	Porsche M96/77 3.6 L Flat-6	?	12	(United Kingdom) David Gooding	10*
(United States) MCR	Porsche 996 GT3-RS	Porsche M96/77 3.6 L Flat-6	?	12	(United Kingdom) Robert Nearn	10*
(France) Perspective USA Corporation	Porsche 996 GT3-R	Porsche M96/77 3.6 L Flat-6	D	21	(Philippines) Angelo Barretto	9–10
(France) Perspective USA Corporation	Porsche 996 GT3-R	Porsche M96/77 3.6 L Flat-6	D	21	(France) Thierry Perrier	9–10
(France) Perspective USA Corporation	Porsche 996 GT3-R	Porsche M96/77 3.6 L Flat-6	D	21	(Belgium) Michel Neugarten	9
(France) Perspective USA Corporation	Porsche 996 GT3-R	Porsche M96/77 3.6 L Flat-6	D	21	(France) Boris Derichebourg	10
(United States) Alex Job Racing	Porsche 996 GT3-RS	Porsche M96/77 3.6 L Flat-6	M	22	(Germany) Timo Bernhard	All
(United States) Alex Job Racing	Porsche 996 GT3-RS	Porsche M96/77 3.6 L Flat-6	M	22	(Germany) Jörg Bergmeister	All
(United States) Alex Job Racing	Porsche 996 GT3-RS	Porsche M96/77 3.6 L Flat-6	M	22	(Germany) Marc Lieb	1, 10
(United States) Alex Job Racing	Porsche 996 GT3-RS	Porsche M96/77 3.6 L Flat-6	M	23	(Germany) Sascha Maassen	All
(United States) Alex Job Racing	Porsche 996 GT3-RS	Porsche M96/77 3.6 L Flat-6	M	23	(Germany) Lucas Lühr	All
(United Kingdom) Sebah Automotive Limited	Porsche 996 GT3-R	Porsche M96/77 3.6 L Flat-6	D	29	(United Kingdom) Bart Hayden	1
(United Kingdom) Sebah Automotive Limited	Porsche 996 GT3-R	Porsche M96/77 3.6 L Flat-6	D	29	(United States) Stephen Earle	1
(United Kingdom) Sebah Automotive Limited	Porsche 996 GT3-R	Porsche M96/77 3.6 L Flat-6	D	29	(United Kingdom) Mark Griffiths	1
(United Kingdom) Sebah Automotive Limited	Porsche 996 GT3-R	Porsche M96/77 3.6 L Flat-6	D	29	(United Kingdom) Richard Dean	10
(United Kingdom) Sebah Automotive Limited	Porsche 996 GT3-R	Porsche M96/77 3.6 L Flat-6	D	29	(Germany) Jürgen von Gartzen	10
(France) JMB Racing	Ferrari 360 Modena N-GT	Ferrari F131 3.6 L V8	P	31	(Italy) Andrea Montermini	1
(France) JMB Racing	Ferrari 360 Modena N-GT	Ferrari F131 3.6 L V8	P	31	(United States) Peter Argetsinger	1
(France) JMB Racing	Ferrari 360 Modena N-GT	Ferrari F131 3.6 L V8	P	31	(United States) Ryan Hunter-Reay	1
(France) JMB Racing	Ferrari 360 Modena N-GT	Ferrari F131 3.6 L V8	P	32	(Brazil) Oswaldo Negri, Jr.	1
(France) JMB Racing	Ferrari 360 Modena N-GT	Ferrari F131 3.6 L V8	P	32	(United States) Joe Vannini	1
(France) JMB Racing	Ferrari 360 Modena N-GT	Ferrari F131 3.6 L V8	P	32	(Italy) Andrea Garbagnati	1
(United States) Petersen Motorsports	Porsche 996 GT3-RS	Porsche M96/77 3.6 L Flat-6	Y	31	(United States) Randy Pobst	2–4, 10
(United States) Petersen Motorsports	Porsche 996 GT3-RS	Porsche M96/77 3.6 L Flat-6	Y	31	(United Kingdom) Johnny Mowlem	2–4, 10
(United States) MSB Motorsport	Ferrari 360 Modena GT	Ferrari F131 3.6 L V8	G	33	(United Kingdom) Marino Franchitti	1
(United States) MSB Motorsport	Ferrari 360 Modena GT	Ferrari F131 3.6 L V8	G	33	(Germany) Ralf Kelleners	1
(France) XL Racing	Ferrari 550 Maranello	Ferrari F133 A 5.5 L V12	Y	34	(United States) Craig Stanton	4, 10
(France) XL Racing	Ferrari 550 Maranello	Ferrari F133 A 5.5 L V12	Y	34	(Italy) Stefano Buttiero	4
(France) XL Racing	Ferrari 550 Maranello	Ferrari F133 A 5.5 L V12	Y	34	(United States) Hugh Plumb	10
(France) XL Racing	Ferrari 550 Maranello	Ferrari F133 A 5.5 L V12	Y	34	(France) Gilles Vannelet	10
(United States) Risi Competizione	Ferrari 360 Modena GT	Ferrari F131 3.6 L V8	P	35	(United States) Anthony Lazzaro	8, 10
(United States) Risi Competizione	Ferrari 360 Modena GT	Ferrari F131 3.6 L V8	P	35	(Germany) Ralf Kelleners	8, 10
(United States) Orbit	Porsche 996 GT3-RS	Porsche M96/77 3.6 L Flat-6	M	42	(United States) Tony Kester	1–5, 9
(United States) Orbit	Porsche 996 GT3-RS	Porsche M96/77 3.6 L Flat-6	M	42	(United States) Gary Schultheis	1–2, 4–5, 10
(United States) Orbit	Porsche 996 GT3-RS	Porsche M96/77 3.6 L Flat-6	M	42	(United States) Grady Willingham	1
(United States) Orbit	Porsche 996 GT3-RS	Porsche M96/77 3.6 L Flat-6	M	42	(United States) Joe Policastro, Jr.	3, 10
(United States) Orbit	Porsche 996 GT3-RS	Porsche M96/77 3.6 L Flat-6	M	42	(United States) John Lloyd	4
(United States) Orbit	Porsche 996 GT3-RS	Porsche M96/77 3.6 L Flat-6	M	42	(United States) Ron Atapattu	9
(United States) Orbit	Porsche 996 GT3-RS	Porsche M96/77 3.6 L Flat-6	M	42	(United States) Joe Policastro, Sr.	10
(United States) Orbit	Porsche 996 GT3-RS	Porsche M96/77 3.6 L Flat-6	M	43	(United States) Peter Baron	All
(United States) Orbit	Porsche 996 GT3-RS	Porsche M96/77 3.6 L Flat-6	M	43	(United States) Leo Hindery	All
(United States) Orbit	Porsche 996 GT3-RS	Porsche M96/77 3.6 L Flat-6	M	43	(United States) Mike Borkowski	1
(United States) Orbit	Porsche 996 GT3-RS	Porsche M96/77 3.6 L Flat-6	M	43	(United States) Tony Kester	10
(Germany) Seikel Motorsport	Porsche 996 GT3-RS	Porsche M96/77 3.6 L Flat-6	Y	52	(United States) Hugh Plumb	1–2, 4, 7–8
(Germany) Seikel Motorsport	Porsche 996 GT3-RS	Porsche M96/77 3.6 L Flat-6	Y	52	(United States) Philip Collin	1–2, 4, 10
(Germany) Seikel Motorsport	Porsche 996 GT3-RS	Porsche M96/77 3.6 L Flat-6	Y	52	(New Zealand) Andrew Bagnall	1, 8
(Germany) Seikel Motorsport	Porsche 996 GT3-RS	Porsche M96/77 3.6 L Flat-6	Y	52	(Canada) Tony Burgess	2, 4, 7–8, 10
(Germany) Seikel Motorsport	Porsche 996 GT3-RS	Porsche M96/77 3.6 L Flat-6	Y	52	(United States) Jeffrey Pabst	7
(Germany) Seikel Motorsport	Porsche 996 GT3-RS	Porsche M96/77 3.6 L Flat-6	Y	52	(United States) Grady Willingham	10
(Germany) Seikel Motorsport	Porsche 996 GT3-RS	Porsche M96/77 3.6 L Flat-6	Y	53	(Italy) Alex Caffi	1
(Germany) Seikel Motorsport	Porsche 996 GT3-RS	Porsche M96/77 3.6 L Flat-6	Y	53	(Italy) Luca Riccitelli	1
(Germany) Seikel Motorsport	Porsche 996 GT3-RS	Porsche M96/77 3.6 L Flat-6	Y	53	(Italy) Gabrio Rosa	1
(Germany) Freisinger Motorsport	Porsche 996 GT3-RS	Porsche M96/77 3.6 L Flat-6	D	57	(France) Romain Dumas	1
(Germany) Freisinger Motorsport	Porsche 996 GT3-RS	Porsche M96/77 3.6 L Flat-6	D	57	(Portugal) Ni Amorim	1
(Germany) Freisinger Motorsport	Porsche 996 GT3-RS	Porsche M96/77 3.6 L Flat-6	D	57	(Germany) Hans Fertl	1
(Germany) Freisinger Motorsport	Porsche 996 GT3-RS	Porsche M96/77 3.6 L Flat-6	D	58	(United States) Chip Vance	1
(Germany) Freisinger Motorsport	Porsche 996 GT3-RS	Porsche M96/77 3.6 L Flat-6	D	58	(France) Georges Forgeois	1
(Germany) Freisinger Motorsport	Porsche 996 GT3-RS	Porsche M96/77 3.6 L Flat-6	D	58	(United States) Stephen Southard	1
(United Kingdom) P.K. Sport	Porsche 996 GT3-RS	Porsche M96/77 3.6 L Flat-6	P	60	(Italy) Giovanni Anapoli	1, 10
(United Kingdom) P.K. Sport	Porsche 996 GT3-RS	Porsche M96/77 3.6 L Flat-6	P	60	(Italy) Fabio Babini	1
(United Kingdom) P.K. Sport	Porsche 996 GT3-RS	Porsche M96/77 3.6 L Flat-6	P	60	(United Kingdom) Robin Liddell	1
(United Kingdom) P.K. Sport	Porsche 996 GT3-RS	Porsche M96/77 3.6 L Flat-6	P	60	(Austria) Philipp Peter	10
(United Kingdom) P.K. Sport	Porsche 996 GT3-RS	Porsche M96/77 3.6 L Flat-6	P	60	(United States) Joe Foster	10
(United Kingdom) P.K. Sport	Porsche 996 GT3-R	Porsche M96/77 3.6 L Flat-6	P	61	(United Kingdom) Piers Masarati	1, 10
(United Kingdom) P.K. Sport	Porsche 996 GT3-R	Porsche M96/77 3.6 L Flat-6	P	61	(United States) Keith Alexander	1
(United Kingdom) P.K. Sport	Porsche 996 GT3-R	Porsche M96/77 3.6 L Flat-6	P	61	(United Kingdom) Basil Demeroutis	1
(United Kingdom) P.K. Sport	Porsche 996 GT3-R	Porsche M96/77 3.6 L Flat-6	P	61	(United Kingdom) Gavin Pickering	10
(United Kingdom) P.K. Sport	Porsche 996 GT3-R	Porsche M96/77 3.6 L Flat-6	P	61	(United Kingdom) Robin Liddell	10
(United Kingdom) Harlow Motorsport - Ricardo	Porsche 996 GT3-R	Porsche M96/77 3.6 L Flat-6	D	65	(United Kingdom) Terry Rymer	1
(United Kingdom) Harlow Motorsport - Ricardo	Porsche 996 GT3-R	Porsche M96/77 3.6 L Flat-6	D	65	(United Kingdom) Mike Youles	1
(United Kingdom) Harlow Motorsport - Ricardo	Porsche 996 GT3-R	Porsche M96/77 3.6 L Flat-6	D	65	(United Kingdom) Johnny Mowlem	1
(United States) The Racer's Group	Porsche 996 GT3-RS	Porsche M96/77 3.6 L Flat-6	M	66	(United States) Kevin Buckler	All
(United States) The Racer's Group	Porsche 996 GT3-RS	Porsche M96/77 3.6 L Flat-6	M	66	(United States) Michael Schrom	1, 4, 6, 10
(United States) The Racer's Group	Porsche 996 GT3-RS	Porsche M96/77 3.6 L Flat-6	M	66	(United States) Darren Law	1
(United States) The Racer's Group	Porsche 996 GT3-RS	Porsche M96/77 3.6 L Flat-6	M	66	(United Kingdom) Marino Franchitti	2
(United States) The Racer's Group	Porsche 996 GT3-RS	Porsche M96/77 3.6 L Flat-6	M	66	(United States) B. J. Zacharias	3
(United States) The Racer's Group	Porsche 996 GT3-RS	Porsche M96/77 3.6 L Flat-6	M	66	(United States) Brian Cunningham	4–5, 7–10
(United States) The Racer's Group	Porsche 996 GT3-RS	Porsche M96/77 3.6 L Flat-6	M	67	(United States) Larry Schumacher	1
(United States) The Racer's Group	Porsche 996 GT3-RS	Porsche M96/77 3.6 L Flat-6	M	67	(United States) Robert Nagel	1
(United States) The Racer's Group	Porsche 996 GT3-RS	Porsche M96/77 3.6 L Flat-6	M	67	(United States) Jim Pace	1
(United States) The Racer's Group	Porsche 996 GT3-RS	Porsche M96/77 3.6 L Flat-6	M	67	(United States) Vic Rice	2, 8–9
(United States) The Racer's Group	Porsche 996 GT3-RS	Porsche M96/77 3.6 L Flat-6	M	67	(United States) Robert Orcutt	2
(United States) The Racer's Group	Porsche 996 GT3-RS	Porsche M96/77 3.6 L Flat-6	M	67	(United States) Michael Schrom	5, 7–9
(United States) The Racer's Group	Porsche 996 GT3-RS	Porsche M96/77 3.6 L Flat-6	M	67	(United States) Darren Law	5, 7
(United States) Speedsource	Porsche 996 GT3-R	Porsche M96/77 3.6 L Flat-6	D	70	(United States) Selby Wellman	5
(United States) Speedsource	Porsche 996 GT3-R	Porsche M96/77 3.6 L Flat-6	D	70	(United States) Paul Mears, Jr.	5
(United States) Speedsource	Porsche 996 GT3-R	Porsche M96/77 3.6 L Flat-6	D	70	(Canada) Sylvain Tremblay	5
(Italy) MAC Racing SRL	Porsche 996 GT3-R	Porsche M96/77 3.6 L Flat-6	D	72	(United States) Derek Clark	1*
(Italy) MAC Racing SRL	Porsche 996 GT3-R	Porsche M96/77 3.6 L Flat-6	D	72	(Italy) Mauro Casadei	1*
(United States) J3 Racing	Porsche 996 GT3-RS	Porsche M96/77 3.6 L Flat-6	P	79	(United States) Justin Jackson	1–5, 8–10
(United States) J3 Racing	Porsche 996 GT3-RS	Porsche M96/77 3.6 L Flat-6	P	79	(United States) Mike Fitzgerald	1–5, 8–10
(United States) J3 Racing	Porsche 996 GT3-RS	Porsche M96/77 3.6 L Flat-6	P	79	(United States) David Murry	1, 4
(United States) J3 Racing	Porsche 996 GT3-RS	Porsche M96/77 3.6 L Flat-6	P	79	(United States) Chris McMurry	10
(United States) Rennwerks Motorsports	Porsche 996 GT3-R	Porsche M96/77 3.6 L Flat-6	D	83	(United States) Richard Steranka	8
(United States) Rennwerks Motorsports	Porsche 996 GT3-R	Porsche M96/77 3.6 L Flat-6	D	83	(United States) Dave Standridge	8
(United Kingdom) Graham Nash Motorsport	Porsche 996 GT3-R	Porsche M96/77 3.6 L Flat-6	P	84	(Germany) Dino Steiner	1*
(United Kingdom) Graham Nash Motorsport	Porsche 996 GT3-R	Porsche M96/77 3.6 L Flat-6	P	84	(United Kingdom) Chris Ellis	1*
(United Kingdom) Graham Nash Motorsport	Porsche 996 GT3-R	Porsche M96/77 3.6 L Flat-6	P	84	(United Kingdom) Geoff Lister	1*
(France) 917 Racing Team	Porsche 996 GT3-RS	Porsche M96/77 3.6 L Flat-6	M	85	(France) Hervé Clément	1
(France) 917 Racing Team	Porsche 996 GT3-RS	Porsche M96/77 3.6 L Flat-6	M	85	(Germany) André Ahrlé	1
(France) 917 Racing Team	Porsche 996 GT3-RS	Porsche M96/77 3.6 L Flat-6	M	85	(France) Bernard Simmenauer	1
(Canada) Porschehaus Racing	Porsche 996 GT3-R	Porsche M96/77 3.6 L Flat-6	D	88	(Canada) Stephane Veilleux	2, 4–6
(Canada) Porschehaus Racing	Porsche 996 GT3-R	Porsche M96/77 3.6 L Flat-6	D	88	(Canada) Peter Overing	2, 4–5
(Canada) Porschehaus Racing	Porsche 996 GT3-R	Porsche M96/77 3.6 L Flat-6	D	88	(Canada) Jean-Francois Dumoulin	6
(Canada) Porschehaus Racing	Porsche 996 GT3-RS	Porsche M96/77 3.6 L Flat-6	D	89	(United States) Adam Merzon	2–7
(Canada) Porschehaus Racing	Porsche 996 GT3-RS	Porsche M96/77 3.6 L Flat-6	D	89	(Canada) Robert Julien	2–7
(United States) Cirtek Motorsport	Porsche 996 GT3-RS	Porsche M96/77 3.6 L Flat-6	D	98	(United States) Chris Gleason	1*
(United States) Cirtek Motorsport	Porsche 996 GT3-RS	Porsche M96/77 3.6 L Flat-6	D	98	(United Kingdom) Robert Nearn	1*
(United States) Cirtek Motorsport	Porsche 996 GT3-RS	Porsche M96/77 3.6 L Flat-6	D	98	(United States) Larry Schumacher	1*
(United States) Cirtek Motorsport	Porsche 996 GT3-RS	Porsche M96/77 3.6 L Flat-6	D	98	(Monaco) Stéphane Ortelli	10
(United States) Cirtek Motorsport	Porsche 996 GT3-RS	Porsche M96/77 3.6 L Flat-6	D	98	(France) Christophe Bouchut	10
(United States) Cirtek Motorsport	Porsche 996 GT3-R	Porsche M96/77 3.6 L Flat-6	D	99	(New Zealand) Rob Wilson	1
(United States) Cirtek Motorsport	Porsche 996 GT3-R	Porsche M96/77 3.6 L Flat-6	D	99	(United States) Chris Gleason	1
(United States) Cirtek Motorsport	Porsche 996 GT3-R	Porsche M96/77 3.6 L Flat-6	D	99	(United Kingdom) Paul Dawson	1
(United States) Schumacher Racing	Porsche 996 GT3-RS	Porsche M96/77 3.6 L Flat-6	D	99	(United States) Larry Schumacher	2–3, 5
(United States) Schumacher Racing	Porsche 996 GT3-RS	Porsche M96/77 3.6 L Flat-6	D	99	(United States) David Murry	2–3, 5

* Was on the entry list but did not participate in the event.

BMW had planned on entering with Prototype Technology Group and Team Schnitzer running their BMW M3 E46 GTR. However BMW withdrew before the start of the season due to sudden changes in the homologation rules.

== Season results ==
Overall winner in bold.

Rnd	Circuit	LMP900 Winning Team	LMP675 Winning Team	GTS Winning Team	GT Winning Team	Results
Rnd	Circuit	LMP900 Winning Drivers	LMP675 Winning Drivers	GTS Winning Drivers	GT Winning Drivers	Results
1	Sebring	**(Germany) #2 Audi Sport North America**	(United States) #37 Intersport Racing	(United States) #3 Corvette Racing	(United States) #23 Alex Job Racing	Results
1	Sebring	**(Italy) Rinaldo Capello** **(Italy) Christian Pescatori** **(United Kingdom) Johnny Herbert**	(United States) Jon Field (United States) Duncan Dayton (United States) Mike Durand	(Canada) Ron Fellows (United States) Johnny O'Connell (United Kingdom) Oliver Gavin	(Germany) Sascha Maassen (Germany) Lucas Luhr	Results
2	Infineon	**(United States) #50 Panoz Motor Sports**	(United States) #13 Archangel Motorsports	(United States) #3 Corvette Racing	(United States) #23 Alex Job Racing	Results
2	Infineon	**(Australia) David Brabham** **(Denmark) Jan Magnussen**	(United Kingdom) Ben Devlin (United States) Dave McEntee	(Canada) Ron Fellows (United States) Johnny O'Connell	(Germany) Sascha Maassen (Germany) Lucas Luhr	Results
3	Mid-Ohio	**(Germany) #1 Audi Sport North America**	(United States) #56 Team Bucknum Racing	(United States) #3 Corvette Racing	(United States) #66 The Racer's Group	Results
3	Mid-Ohio	**(Germany) Frank Biela** **(Italy) Emanuele Pirro**	(United States) Jeff Bucknum (United States) Chris McMurry (United States) Bryan Willman	(Canada) Ron Fellows (United States) Johnny O'Connell	(United States) Kevin Buckler (United States) B.J. Zacharias	Results
4	Road America	**(Germany) #2 Audi Sport North America**	(United States) #13 Archangel Motorsports	(United States) #4 Corvette Racing	(United States) #22 Alex Job Racing	Results
4	Road America	**(Denmark) Tom Kristensen** **(Italy) Rinaldo Capello**	(United Kingdom) Ben Devlin (United States) Peter MacLeod (United States) Larry Oberto	(United States) Andy Pilgrim (United States) Kelly Collins	(Germany) Timo Bernhard (Germany) Jörg Bergmeister	Results
5	RFK Stadium	**(United States) #50 Panoz Motor Sports**	(United States) #37 Intersport Racing	(United States) #3 Corvette Racing	(United States) #23 Alex Job Racing	Results
5	RFK Stadium	**(Australia) David Brabham** **(Denmark) Jan Magnussen**	(United States) Jon Field (United States) Clint Field	(Canada) Ron Fellows (United States) Johnny O'Connell	(Germany) Sascha Maassen (Germany) Lucas Luhr	Results
6	Trois-Rivières	**(Germany) #2 Audi Sport North America**	(United States) #56 Team Bucknum Racing	(United States) #4 Corvette Racing	(United States) #23 Alex Job Racing	Results
6	Trois-Rivières	**(Denmark) Tom Kristensen** **(Italy) Rinaldo Capello**	(United States) Jeff Bucknum (United States) Chris McMurry (United States) Bryan Willman	(United States) Andy Pilgrim (United States) Kelly Collins	(Germany) Sascha Maassen (Germany) Lucas Luhr	Results
7	Mosport	**(Germany) #2 Audi Sport North America**	(United States) #56 Team Bucknum Racing	(United States) #3 Corvette Racing	(United States) #66 The Racer's Group	Results
7	Mosport	**(Denmark) Tom Kristensen** **(Italy) Rinaldo Capello**	(United States) Jeff Bucknum (United States) Chris McMurry (United States) Bryan Willman	(Canada) Ron Fellows (United States) Johnny O'Connell	(United States) Kevin Buckler (United States) Brian Cunningham	Results
8	Laguna Seca	**(Germany) #1 Audi Sport North America**	(United States) #11 KnightHawk Racing	(United Kingdom) #33 Prodrive	(United States) #23 Alex Job Racing	Results
8	Laguna Seca	**(Germany) Frank Biela** **(Italy) Emanuele Pirro**	(United States) Chad Block (United States) Steve Knight (Germany) Claudia Hürtgen	(Czech Republic) Tomáš Enge (Netherlands) Peter Kox	(Germany) Sascha Maassen (Germany) Lucas Luhr	Results
9	Miami	**(Germany) #1 Audi Sport North America**	(United States) #11 KnightHawk Racing	(United States) #3 Corvette Racing	(United States) #23 Alex Job Racing	Results
9	Miami	**(Germany) Frank Biela** **(Italy) Emanuele Pirro**	(United States) Chad Block (Germany) Claudia Hürtgen	(Canada) Ron Fellows (United States) Johnny O'Connell	(Germany) Sascha Maassen (Germany) Lucas Luhr	Results
10	Road Atlanta	**(Germany) #2 Audi Sport North America**	(United States) #37 Intersport Racing	(United States) #3 Corvette Racing	(United States) #23 Alex Job Racing	Results
10	Road Atlanta	**(Denmark) Tom Kristensen** **(Italy) Rinaldo Capello**	(United States) Jon Field (United States) Duncan Dayton (United States) Michael Durand	(Canada) Ron Fellows (United States) Johnny O'Connell (United Kingdom) Oliver Gavin	(Germany) Sascha Maassen (Germany) Lucas Luhr	Results

== Championship results ==
Points are awarded to the finishers in the following order:

- 25-21-19-17-15-14-13-12-11-10-...

Exceptions being for the 12 Hours of Sebring and Petit Le Mans which awarded in the following order:

- 30-26-24-22-20-19-18-17-16-15-...

Cars failing to complete 70% of the winner's distance are not awarded points. Teams only score the points of their highest finishing entry in each race.

Points systems
Race	1st	2nd	3rd	4th	5th	6th	7th	8th	9th	10th	11th	12th	13th	14th	15th	16th	17th	18th	19th	FQ	Most laps
Normal	25	21	19	17	15	14	13	12	11	10	9	8	7	6	5	4	3	2	1	1	1
1000+ km	30	26	24	22	20	19	18	17	16	15	14	13	12	11	10	9	8	7	6	1	1

=== LMP900 Drivers' Championship ===
Pos.	Driver	Team	SEB (United States)	SON (United States)	MOH (United States)	ROA (United States)	D.C. (United States)	TRO (Canada)	MOS (Canada)	LAG (United States)	MIA (United States)	ATL (United States)	Pts.
1	(Denmark) Tom Kristensen	(Germany) Audi Sport North America	**5**		2	**1**	2	1	1	4	3	1	232
1	(Denmark) Tom Kristensen	(United States) Champion Racing		**2**									232
2	(Italy) Rinaldo Capello	(Germany) Audi Sport North America	1	8	2	**1**	2	1	1	4	3	1	230
3	(Germany) Frank Biela	(Germany) Audi Sport North America	**5**	8	**1**	2	**3**	**2**	**8**	**1**	**1**	**6**	209
4	(Italy) Emanuele Pirro	(Germany) Audi Sport North America	**5**	8	**1**	2	**3**	**2**	**8**	**1**	**1**	**6**	206
4	(United Kingdom) Johnny Herbert	(Germany) Audi Sport North America	1										206
4	(United Kingdom) Johnny Herbert	(United States) Champion Racing		**2**	8	3	5	3	2	2	5	2	206
6	(Australia) David Brabham	(United States) Panoz Motor Sports	15	1	3	7	1	5	4	5	4	7	177
7	(Denmark) Jan Magnussen	(United States) Panoz Motor Sports	15	1	3	7	1	5	4	5	4	7	175
8	(Sweden) Stefan Johansson	(United States) Champion Racing	2		8	3	5	3	2	2	5	2	171
9	(United States) Bill Auberlen	(United States) Panoz Motor Sports	7	3	4	8	6	4	5	6	8	5	161
10	(United States) Bryan Herta	(United States) Panoz Motor Sports	7	3	4	8	6	4	5	6	8	5	153
11	(Italy) Max Angelelli	(United States) Team Cadillac	11				4		3	3	2	3	118
12	(Venezuela) Milka Duno	(United States) MBD Sportscar	14	7	6	5							106
12	(Venezuela) Milka Duno	(United States) Intersport Racing					8						106
12	(Venezuela) Milka Duno	(United Kingdom) Chamberlain								8	10	10	106
13	(Finland) J.J. Lehto	(United States) Team Cadillac	9						3	3	2	3	101
14	(France) Emmanuel Collard	(United States) Team Cadillac	9				9		6	9	7	4	91
15	(United States) Clint Field	(United States) Intersport Racing		5		4			7	7	9	11	88
16	(United Kingdom) James Weaver	(United States) Dyson Racing Team	4	4	5		7	6					83
17	(United States) Mark Neuhaus	(United States) Intersport Racing	16	5	7				7	7	9	11	81
18	(France) Éric Bernard	(United States) Team Cadillac	9				9		6	9	7	4	78
19	(United States) Chris Dyson	(United States) Dyson Racing Team	8	4			7	6					64
20	(Belgium) Marc Goossens	(United States) Riley & Scott Racing	3								6	9	56
21	(Belgium) Didier de Radigues	(United States) MBD Sportscar	13	6	9	6							55
21	(Canada) Scott Maxwell	(United States) MBD Sportscar	14	7	6	5							55
23	(Canada) John Graham	(United States) MBD Sportscar	14	6	9	6							50
24	(United Kingdom) Christian Vann	(United Kingdom) Team Ascari	6										48
24	(United Kingdom) Christian Vann	(United Kingdom) Chamberlain								8	10	10	48
25	(United States) Butch Leitzinger	(United States) Dyson Racing Team	4		5								37
26	(United States) David Donohue	(United States) Panoz Motor Sports	7	DNS								7	36
27	(United States) Gunnar Jeannette	(United States) Gunnar Racing	12										34
27	(United States) Gunnar Jeannette	(United States) Panoz Motor Sports		DNS								5	34
28	(United States) Joel Field	(United States) Intersport Racing			7	4							31
28	(France) Christophe Tinseau	(United States) Team Cadillac	11				4						31
28	(United States) Tony Ave	(United States) Riley & Scott Racing									6	9	31
31	(Italy) Christian Pescatori	(Germany) Audi Sport North America	1										30
32	(Netherlands) Jan Lammers	(United States) Champion Racing	2										27
33	(United Kingdom) Andy Wallace	(United States) Champion Racing	2										26
33	(United States) Andy Lally	(United States) Intersport Racing					8	7					26
35	(United States) Jim Matthews	(United States) Riley & Scott Racing	3										24
35	(United Kingdom) Guy Smith	(United States) Riley & Scott Racing	3										24
37	(United States) Elliot Forbes-Robinson	(United States) Dyson Racing Team	4										22
38	(United Kingdom) Ben Collins	(United Kingdom) Team Ascari	6										20
39	(United Kingdom) Justin Wilson	(United Kingdom) Team Ascari	6										19
40	(United States) Dorsey Schroeder	(United States) Dyson Racing Team	8										18
40	(France) Patrice Roussel	(United States) Sezio Florida Racing Team										8	18
42	(United States) Rob Dyson	(United States) Dyson Racing Team	8										17
42	(United States) John Mirro	(United States) Sezio Florida Racing Team	DNS									8	17
42	(United States) Jeret Schroeder	(United States) Sezio Florida Racing Team										8	17
45	(South Africa) Werner Lupberger	(United Kingdom) Team Ascari	10										16
46	(United States) Timothy Bell	(United Kingdom) Team Ascari	10										15
46	(Denmark) Kristian Kolby	(United Kingdom) Team Ascari	10										15
46	(France) Xavier Pompidou	(United Kingdom) Chamberlain										10	15
49	(South Africa) Wayne Taylor	(United States) Team Cadillac	11										14
49	(United States) John Miller	(United States) Intersport Racing										11	14
51	(United States) Wayne Jackson	(United States) Gunnar Racing	12										13
51	(United States) Chad Block	(United States) Gunnar Racing	12										13
51	(United States) John Macaluso	(United States) Intersport Racing	16					7					13
54	(Belgium) Bruno Lambert	(United States) MBD Sportscar	13										12
54	(United States) Rick Sutherland	(United States) MBD Sportscar	13										12
-	(Belgium) Eric van de Poele	(United States) Panoz Motor Sports	15										0
-	(United States) Butch Brickell	(United States) Intersport Racing	16										0
-	(Belgium) Didier Theys	(United States) Doran Lista Racing	17										0
-	(Switzerland) Fredy Lienhard	(United States) Doran Lista Racing	17										0
-	(Italy) Mauro Baldi	(United States) Doran Lista Racing	17										0
-	(France) Georges Forgeois	(United States) Sezio Florida Racing Team	DNS										0
-	(France) François O'Born	(United States) Sezio Florida Racing Team	DNS										0
Pos.	Driver	Team	SEB (United States)	SON (United States)	MOH (United States)	ROA (United States)	D.C. (United States)	TRO (Canada)	MOS (Canada)	LAG (United States)	MIA (United States)	ATL (United States)	Pts.

==== LMP900 Teams Championship ====
Teams only score the points of their highest finishing entry in each race.

Pos.	Team	No.	SEB (United States)	SON (United States)	MOH (United States)	ROA (United States)	D.C. (United States)	TRO (Canada)	MOS (Canada)	LAG (United States)	MIA (United States)	ATL (United States)	Pts.
1	(Germany) Audi Sport North America	1	**5**	8	**1**	2	**3**	**2**	**8**	**1**	**1**	**6**	243
1	(Germany) Audi Sport North America	2	1		2	**1**	2	1	1	4	3	1	243
2	(United States) Champion Racing	38	2	**2**	8	3	5	3	2	2	5	2	195
3	(United States) Panoz Motor Sports	49		DNS									186
3	(United States) Panoz Motor Sports	50	15	1	3	7	1	5	4	5	4	7	186
3	(United States) Panoz Motor Sports	51	7	3	4	8	6	4	5	6	8	5	186
4	(United States) Intersport Racing	30	16	5	7	4	8	7	7	7	9	11	121
5	(United States) Team Cadillac	7	9				9		6	9	7	4	116
5	(United States) Team Cadillac	8	11				4		3	3	2	3	116
6	(United States) Dyson Racing Team	16	4	4	5		7	6					81
6	(United States) Dyson Racing Team	20	8										81
7	(United States) MBD Sportscar	17	14	7	6	5							55
7	(United States) MBD Sportscar	18	13	6	9	6							55
8	(United States) Riley & Scott Racing	36	3								6	9	54
9	(United Kingdom) Chamberlain	27								8	10	10	37
10	(United Kingdom) Team Ascari	19	10										19
10	(United Kingdom) Team Ascari	21	6										19
11	(United States) Sezio Florida Racing Team	87	DNS									8	17
12	(United States) Gunnar Racing	00	12										13
-	(United States) Doran Lista Racing	27	17										0
Pos.	Team		SEB (United States)	SON (United States)	MOH (United States)	ROA (United States)	D.C. (United States)	TRO (Canada)	MOS (Canada)	LAG (United States)	MIA (United States)	ATL (United States)	Pts.

==== LMP675 Drivers' Championship ====
Bold - Pole position. Q - Fastest Qualifier M - Most laps driven. * - Not awarded points.

Pos.	Driver	Team	SEB (United States)	SON (United States)	MOH (United States)	ROA (United States)	D.C. (United States)	TRO (Canada)	MOS (Canada)	LAG (United States)	MIA (United States)	ATL (United States)	Pts.
1	(United States) Jon Field	(United States) Intersport Racing	1^{M}	3^{MQ}	4^{MQ}	5^{Q}	1^{M}	4^{M}	6^{MQ}	3^{M}	5	1^{M}	214
2	(United Kingdom) Ben Devlin	(United States) Archangel Motorsports		1^{M}	2^{M}	1^{M}	3^{M}	2^{M}	3^{M}	4^{M}	4^{M}	2^{M}	199
3	(United States) Jeff Bucknum	(United States) Team Bucknum Racing	9*	DNS	1	4^{M}	2^{M}	1^{M}	1^{M}	5^{M}	6	5^{M}	168
4	(United States) Chris McMurry	(United States) Team Bucknum Racing	8*	DNS	1^{M}	4	2	1	1	5	6^{M}	5	164
5	(United States) Bryan Willman	(United States) Team Bucknum Racing	8*	DNS	1	4	2	1	1	5	6	5	162
6	(United States) Chad Block	(United States) KnightHawk Racing, LLC		2^{M}		3	4^{M}	5^{Q}		1^{M}	1^{M}	4	134
7	(United States) Steven Knight	(United States) KnightHawk Racing, LLC	4	2	3	3^{M}	4*	5*	4	1			124
8	(United States) Mike Durand	(United States) Intersport Racing	1			5^{M}			6*		5^{M}	1	92
9	(United Kingdom) James Weaver	(United States) Dyson Racing Team							5^{M}	2^{MQ}	2	7^{Q}	79
10	(Germany) Claudia Hürtgen	(United States) KnightHawk Racing, LLC							4^{M}	1	1^{Q}		69
11	(Canada) Melanie Paterson	(United States) Essex Racing						3^{M}	2				66
11	(Canada) Melanie Paterson	(United States) Team Bucknum Racing										3^{M}	66
12	(United States) Andy Lally	(United States) KnightHawk Racing, LLC	4^{M}									4^{M}	63
12	(United States) Andy Lally	(United States) Archangel Motorsports								4			63
13	(United States) Butch Leitzinger	(United States) Dyson Racing Team							5*	2	2^{M}	7	61
14	(United States) Duncan Dayton	(United States) Intersport Racing	1									1	60
15	(United States) Clint Field	(United States) Intersport Racing			4		1	4					59
16	(United States) Jimmy Adams	(United States) AB Motorsport			5^{M}	2	DNS				3^{M}		57
17	(United States) Joe Blacker	(United States) AB Motorsport			5	2	DNS				3		55
18	(United States) Bret Arsenault	(United States) Archangel Motorsports			2						4		53
18	(United States) Bret Arsenault	(United States) Team Bucknum Racing								6^{M}			53
19	(United States) John Fergus	(Japan) AutoExe Motorsports	3^{M}										45
19	(United States) John Fergus	(United States) KnightHawk Racing, LLC			3^{M}								45
20	(United States) Jim Downing	(Japan) AutoExe Motorsports	3									8^{M}	42
21	(Canada) Marc-Antoine Camirand	(United States) Archangel Motorsports						2	3				40
22	(United States) Rick Sutherland	(United States) Intersport Racing		3						3			38
22	(Germany) Pierre Ehret	(United States) Team Bucknum Racing	8*							6		3	38
24	(United States) Rich Grupp	(United States) Team Spencer Motorsports		4	6^{M}	DNS				7^{M}		10^{M}	34
25	(United States) Ryan Jones	(France) ROC	2^{M}										27
26	(United States) Jeff Jones	(France) ROC	2										26
26	(United States) Jeffrey Jones	(France) ROC	2										26
26	(United States) Jason Workman	(United States) Archangel Motorsports										2	26
26	(France) Georges Forgeois	(United States) Archangel Motorsports										2	26
30	(United States) Dave McEntee	(United States) Archangel Motorsports		1									25
30	(United States) Peter MacLeod	(United States) Archangel Motorsports				1							25
30	(United States) Larry Oberto	(United States) Archangel Motorsports				1							25
33	(United States) John Olsen	(United States) Team Bucknum Racing										3	24
34	(United Kingdom) Jonny Kane	(United States) KnightHawk Racing, LLC	4^{Q}										23
35	(United States) John Burke	(United States) AB Motorsport				2^{M}							22
35	(Canada) Ross Bentley	(United States) Essex Racing							2^{M}				22
37	(United States) Doc Bundy	(Canada) Kyser Racing	6^{M}										20
37	(South Africa) Earl Goddard	(United States) Archangel Motorsports										6^{M}	20
39	(Switzerland) Christophe Pillon	(France) Noël del Bello Racing	7^{M}										19
39	(Canada) Kyle Wankum	(Canada) Kyser Racing	6										19
39	(United States) Joe Foster	(Canada) Kyser Racing	6										19
39	(United States) Mel Hawkins	(United States) KnightHawk Racing, LLC				3							19
39	(United States) Will Langhorne	(United States) Archangel Motorsports					3						19
39	(Canada) Paul Fix	(United States) Essex Racing						3					19
39	(United States) David Sterenberg	(United States) Archangel Motorsports							3				19
39	(United States) Orlam Sonora	(United States) AB Motorsport									3		19
39	(United States) John Mefford	(United States) Archangel Motorsports										6	19
39	(United States) Andrew Davis	(United States) Archangel Motorsports										6	19
39	(United Kingdom) Andy Wallace	(United States) Dyson Racing Team										7^{M}	19
50	(Switzerland) Jean-Denis Délétraz	(France) Noël del Bello Racing	7										18
50	(United Kingdom) Mark Smithson	(France) Noël del Bello Racing	7										18
50	(United States) Ryan Hampton	(United States) Team Spencer Motorsports		4^{M}						7*		10*	18
53	(Japan) Yojiro Terada	(Japan) AutoExe Motorsports	3*									8	17
53	(France) Stéphane Daoudi	(France) Welter Racing	5*										17
53	(France) Stéphane Daoudi	(Japan) AutoExe Motorsports										8	17
53	(Denmark) Casper Elgaard	(United Kingdom) R.N. Motorsports, Ltd.										9^{M}	17
56	(Denmark) John Nielsen	(United Kingdom) R.N. Motorsports, Ltd.										9	16
-	(France) Jean-René de Fournoux	(France) Welter Racing	5*										0
-	(United States) A.J. Smith	(France) Welter Racing	5*										0
-	(United States) Dennis Spencer	(United States) Team Spencer Motorsports			6*	DNS				7*		10*	0
-	(United States) Dick Downs	(United States) Team Bucknum Racing	9*										0
-	(United States) Allan Ziegelman	(United States) Team Bucknum Racing	9*										0
-	(Canada) Stephane Veilleux	(Canada) Porschehaus Racing	DNS										0
-	(Canada) Robert Julien	(Canada) Porschehaus Racing	DNS										0
-	(United States) Adam Merzon	(Canada) Porschehaus Racing	DNS										0
-	(Belgium) Bruno Lambert	(United States) Team Bucknum Racing		DNS									0
Pos.	Driver	Team	SEB (United States)	SON (United States)	MOH (United States)	ROA (United States)	D.C. (United States)	TRO (Canada)	MOS (Canada)	LAG (United States)	MIA (United States)	ATL (United States)	Pts.

==== LMP675 Teams Championship ====
Teams only score the points of their highest finishing entry in each race.

Pos.	Team	No.	SEB (United States)	SON (United States)	MOH (United States)	ROA (United States)	D.C. (United States)	TRO (Canada)	MOS (Canada)	LAG (United States)	MIA (United States)	ATL (United States)	Pts.
1	(United States) KnightHawk Racing, LLC	11	**4**	2	3	3	4	**5**	4	1	**1**	4	202
2	(United States) Intersport Racing	37/30	1	**3**	**4**	**5**	**1**	4	**6**	3	5	1	201
3	(United States) Archangel Motorsports	13		1	2	1	3	2	3	4	4	2	190
4	(United States) Team Bucknum Racing	55	8	DNS						6		3	183
4	(United States) Team Bucknum Racing	56	9	DNS	1	4	2	1	1	5	6	5	183
5	(United States) Dyson Racing Team	16							5	**2**	2	**7**	75
6	(United States) Team Spencer Motorsports	62		4	6	DNS				7		10	59
7	(United States) AB Motorsport	77			5	2	DNS				3		55
8	(Japan) AutoExe Motorsports	24	3									8	41
9	(United States) Essex Racing	19						3	2				40
10	(France) ROC	40	2										26
11	(France) Welter Racing	28	5										20
12	(Canada) Kyser Racing	69	6										19
12	(United States) Archangel Motorsports	74										6	19
14	(France) Noël del Bello Racing	41	7										18
14	(United Kingdom) R.N. Motorsports, Ltd.	15										9	16
-	(Canada) Porschehaus Racing	89	DNS										0
Pos.	Team		SEB (United States)	SON (United States)	MOH (United States)	ROA (United States)	D.C. (United States)	TRO (Canada)	MOS (Canada)	LAG (United States)	MIA (United States)	ATL (United States)	Pts.

==== GTS Drivers' Championship ====
Bold - Pole position. Q - Fastest Qualifier M - Most laps driven. * - Not awarded points.

Pos.	Driver	Team	SEB (United States)	SON (United States)	MOH (United States)	ROA (United States)	D.C. (United States)	TRO (Canada)	MOS (Canada)	LAG (United States)	MIA (United States)	ATL (United States)	Pts.
1	(Canada) Ron Fellows	(United States) Corvette Racing	**1^{MQ}**	**1^{MQ}**	**1^{Q}**	**2^{MQ}**	**1^{MQ}**	**2^{Q}**	1^{M}	5^{M}	1	1	254
2	(United States) Johnny O'Connell	(United States) Corvette Racing	**1**	**1**	**1^{M}**	**2**	**1**	**2^{M}**	1	5*	1^{M}	1^{M}	231
3	(United States) Kelly Collins	(United States) Corvette Racing	4^{M}	2^{M}	2^{M}	1	2	1	2	3^{M}	2^{M}	3	225
4	(United States) Andy Pilgrim	(United States) Corvette Racing	4	2	2	1^{M}	2^{M}	1^{M}	2^{M}	3	2	3^{M}	225
5	(United States) Terry Borcheller	(Germany) Konrad Motorsport	2^{M}	3	4^{M}	6^{M}	4^{M}	6^{M}	**3^{MQ}**	2^{M}	**8^{Q}**	6^{M}	174
6	(United States) Marc Bunting	(United States) American Viperacing	9	5^{M}	3^{M}	4^{M}	6^{M}	4^{M}	4	4^{M}	5	9^{M}	154
7	(Italy) Emanuele Naspetti	(Italy) Team Olive Garden	11*	DSQ	5^{M}	3^{M}	3^{M}	3^{M}	6^{M}	6^{M}	4^{M}	4^{M}	147
8	(Austria) Franz Konrad	(Germany) Konrad Motorsport	2	3^{M}	4	6*	4	6*	**3**	2	**8***	6	139
9	(Italy) Mimmo Schiattarella	(Italy) Team Olive Garden	11*	DSQ	5	3	3	3	6	6*	4	4	125
10	(United Kingdom) Marino Franchitti	(United States) American Viperacing					5^{M}	4	4^{M}	4	5^{M}	7	102
11	(United States) Shane Lewis	(United States) American Viperacing	5^{M}	4^{M}	6^{M}	5^{M}	6						98
11	(United States) Shane Lewis	(United Kingdom) Graham Nash Motorsport									7^{M}		98
12	(United States) Tom Weickardt	(United States) American Viperacing	9	5*	3	4	5	5	5	7*	9*	9*	97
13	(Czech Republic) Tomáš Enge	(United Kingdom) Prodrive	6^{M}							**1^{MQ}**	3^{M}	**2^{Q}**	94
14	(United Kingdom) Oliver Gavin	(United States) Corvette Racing	**1**			2						1	81
15	(Netherlands) Peter Kox	(United Kingdom) Prodrive								**1**	3	**2^{M}**	71
16	(Switzerland) Toni Seiler	(Germany) Konrad Motorsport	2								8^{M}	6	58
17	(United States) Kevin Allen	(United States) American Viperacing			6			5^{M}	5^{M}				46
17	(France) Franck Fréon	(United States) Corvette Racing	4									3	46
19	(Switzerland) Alain Menu	(United Kingdom) Prodrive	6									**2**	45
20	(United States) Vic Rice	(United States) Park Place Racing	7										36
20	(United States) Vic Rice	(United Kingdom) Graham Nash Motorsport										8^{M}	36
20	(Netherlands) Mike Hezemans	(Netherlands) Team Carsport Holland	8^{M}										36
20	(Netherlands) Mike Hezemans	(United States) American Viperacing										7	36
22	(United States) Charles Slater	(Germany) Konrad Motorsport	DSQ								6^{M}	5	35
23	(United States) Sean Murphy	(Germany) Konrad Motorsport									6	5	34
24	(France) Christophe Bouchut	(France) Larbre Competition Chereau	3^{M}										25
25	(Belgium) Vincent Vosse	(France) Larbre Competition Chereau	3										24
26	(Italy) Max Papis	(Italy) Team Olive Garden										4	22
27	(France) Jean-François Yvon	(Germany) Konrad Motorsport										5^{M}	21
28	(United States) Rick Fairbanks	(United States) American Viperacing	5										20
28	(United States) Norman Goldrich	(United States) American Viperacing	5										20
30	(United States) Chris Bingham	(United States) Park Place Racing	7^{M}										19
30	(Sweden) Rickard Rydell	(United Kingdom) Prodrive	6										19
30	(Italy) Fabio Babini	(United States) American Viperacing										7^{M}	19
33	(United States) Peter MacLeod	(United States) Park Place Racing	7										18
34	(United States) Simon Gregg	(United States) American Viperacing	9^{M}										17
34	(Belgium) Anthony Kumpen	(Netherlands) Team Carsport Holland	8										17
34	(Italy) Luca Cappellari	(Netherlands) Team Carsport Holland	8										17
34	(United States) Tom Grunnah	(United States) American Viperacing				4							17
34	(United Kingdom) Mike Newton	(United Kingdom) Graham Nash Motorsport										8	17
34	(United Kingdom) Shaun Balfe	(United Kingdom) Graham Nash Motorsport										8	17
40	(Italy) Gianni Morbidelli	(United States) American Viperacing				5							15
40	(United States) Jeff Altenburg	(United States) American Viperacing								7^{M}	9^{M}		15
42	(United States) Regan Morgan	(United Kingdom) Graham Nash Motorsport									7		13
-	(United States) Spencer Trenery	(United States) American Viperacing		4*									0
-	(France) Jean-Philippe Belloc	(United States) American Viperacing										9*	0
-	(Brazil) Thomas Erdos	(United Kingdom) Graham Nash Motorsport	10*								DNS	DNS	0
-	(United Kingdom) Ian McKellar	(United Kingdom) Graham Nash Motorsport	10*										0
-	(United States) Ron Johnson	(United Kingdom) Graham Nash Motorsport	10*										0
-	(Venezuela) Johnny Cecotto	(Italy) Team Olive Garden	11*										0
-	(Portugal) Pedro Chaves	(United Kingdom) Graham Nash Motorsport									DNS		0
-	(United Kingdom) Robin Liddell	(United Kingdom) Graham Nash Motorsport										DNS	0
-	(United Kingdom) Rob Barff	(United Kingdom) Graham Nash Motorsport										DNS	0
-	(United Kingdom) Gavin Pickering	(Germany) Konrad Motorsport	DSQ										0
-	(Switzerland) Walter Brun	(Germany) Konrad Motorsport	DSQ										0
Pos.	Driver	Team	SEB (United States)	SON (United States)	MOH (United States)	ROA (United States)	D.C. (United States)	TRO (Canada)	MOS (Canada)	LAG (United States)	MIA (United States)	ATL (United States)	Pts.

==== GTS Teams Championship ====
Teams only score the points of their highest finishing entry in each race.

Pos.	Team	No.	SEB (United States)	SON (United States)	MOH (United States)	ROA (United States)	D.C. (United States)	TRO (Canada)	MOS (Canada)	LAG (United States)	MIA (United States)	ATL (United States)	Pts.
1	(United States) Corvette Racing	3	**1**	**1**	**1**	**2**	**1**	**2**	1	5	1	1	254
1	(United States) Corvette Racing	4	4	2	2	1	2	1	2	3	2	3	254
2	(Germany) Konrad Motorsport	25	DSQ								6	5	181
2	(Germany) Konrad Motorsport	26	2	3	4	6	4	6	**3**	2	**8**	6	181
3	(United States) American Viperacing	44	9	5	3	4	5	5	5	7	9	9	172
3	(United States) American Viperacing	45	5	4	6	5	6	4	4	4	5	7	172
4	(Italy) Team Olive Garden	0	11	DSQ	5	3	3	3	6	6	4	4	152
5	(United Kingdom) Prodrive	33/77	6							**1**	3	**2**	89
6	(United Kingdom) Graham Nash Motorsport	83	10								7	8	44
6	(United Kingdom) Graham Nash Motorsport	84									DNS	DNS	44
7	(France) Larbre Competition Chereau	86	3										24
8	(United States) Park Place Racing	5	7										18
9	(Netherlands) Team Carsport Holland	46	8										17
Pos.	Team		SEB (United States)	SON (United States)	MOH (United States)	ROA (United States)	D.C. (United States)	TRO (Canada)	MOS (Canada)	LAG (United States)	MIA (United States)	ATL (United States)	Pts.

==== GT Drivers' Championship ====
Bold - Pole position. Q - Fastest Qualifier M - Most laps driven. * - Not awarded points.

Pos.	Driver	Team	SEB (United States)	SON (United States)	MOH (United States)	ROA (United States)	D.C. (United States)	TRO (Canada)	MOS (Canada)	LAG (United States)	MIA (United States)	ATL (United States)	Pts.
1	(Germany) Lucas Lühr	(United States) Alex Job Racing	**1**	1^{M}	**9**	**2^{MQ}**	**1**	**1^{MQ}**	**3^{Q}**	**1^{Q}**	**1^{MQ}**	1	245
1	(Germany) Sascha Maassen	(United States) Alex Job Racing	**1^{MQ}**	1	**9^{MQ}**	**2**	**1^{MQ}**	**1**	**3^{M}**	**1^{M}**	**1**	1^{M}	245
3	(United States) Kevin Buckler	(United States) The Racer's Group	17*	**2^{Q}**	1	3^{M}	2^{M}	3^{M}	1	3	3^{M}	5	193
4	(Germany) Jörg Bergmeister	(United States) Alex Job Racing	9^{M}	3	2^{M}	1	3	2	6^{M}	7	2^{M}	**14^{MQ}**	186
5	(Germany) Timo Bernhard	(United States) Alex Job Racing	9	3^{M}	2	1^{M}	3^{M}	2^{M}	6	7^{M}	2	**14**	185
6	(United States) Peter Baron	(United States) Orbit	6^{M}	5^{M}	6^{M}	6^{M}	12^{M}	5	2^{M}	5^{M}	5^{M}	4^{M}	167
7	(United States) Leo Hindery	(United States) Orbit	6	5	6	6	12	5^{M}	2	5	5	4	159
8	(United States) Brian Cunningham	(United States) The Racer's Group				3	2		1^{M}	3^{M}	3	5^{M}	126
9	(United States) Michael Schrom	(United States) The Racer's Group	17*			3	4	3	5^{M}	4	8^{M}	5	121
10	(United States) Tony Kester	(United States) Orbit	14	6^{M}	7^{M}	5^{M}	6^{M}				6^{M}	4	108
11	(United States) Hugh Plumb	(Germany) Seikel Motorsport	2^{M}	8		4			4^{M}	6			100
11	(United States) Hugh Plumb	(France) XL Racing										13	100
12	(United States) Mike Fitzgerald	(United States) J3 Racing	16*	4^{M}	3^{M}	9^{M}	9^{M}			9^{M}	4^{M}	16*^{M}	93
13	(United States) Justin Jackson	(United States) J3 Racing	16*^{M}	4	3	9	9			9	4	16*	87
14	(Canada) Tony Burgess	(Germany) Seikel Motorsport		8^{M}		4			4	6		7^{M}	80
15	(Canada) Robert Julien	(Canada) Porschehaus Racing		7^{M}	5^{M}	8^{M}	11	8^{M}	7				78
16	(United States) Philip Collin	(Germany) Seikel Motorsport	2	8		4^{M}						7	74
17	(United States) Gary Schultheis	(United States) Orbit	14^{M}	6		5	6					10^{M}	71
18	(United States) Larry Schumacher	(United States) The Racer's Group	4^{M}										66
18	(United States) Larry Schumacher	(United States) Schumacher Racing		10^{M}	4		5						66
19	(United States) Adam Merzon	(Canada) Porschehaus Racing		7	5	8^{M}	11^{M}	8*	7^{M}				65
20	(United Kingdom) Johnny Mowlem	(United Kingdom) Harlow Motorsport - Ricardo	12										64
20	(United Kingdom) Johnny Mowlem	(United States) Petersen Motorsports		9	8^{M}	DSQ						2^{M}	64
21	(United States) David Murry	(United States) J3 Racing	16*			9							55
21	(United States) David Murry	(United States) Schumacher Racing		10	4^{M}		5^{M}						55
22	(United States) Chris Gleason	(United States) Cirtek Motorsport	13										53
22	(United States) Chris Gleason	(United States) Alegra Motorsports					7^{M}	6^{M}			10*^{M}	15^{M}	53
23	(United States) Randy Pobst	(United States) Petersen Motorsports		9^{M}	8	DSQ						2	50
24	(United States) Anthony Lazzaro	(United States) Risi Competizione								2^{M}		3^{M}	47
25	(Germany) Ralf Kelleners	(United States) MSB Motorsport	21*										45
25	(Germany) Ralf Kelleners	(United States) Risi Competizione								2		3	45
26	(Italy) Giovanni Anapoli	(United Kingdom) P.K. Sport	3									6	43
27	(New Zealand) Andrew Bagnall	(Germany) Seikel Motorsport	2							6^{M}			41
28	(United States) Carlos DeQuesada	(United States) Alegra Motorsports					13^{M}	7^{M}			9*^{M}	8	40
29	(United States) Emil Assentato	(United States) Alegra Motorsports					7	6			10*	15	37
30	(United States) Darren Law	(United States) The Racer's Group	17*				4^{M}		5				33
31	(United States) Scooter Gabel	(United States) Alegra Motorsports					13*	7			9*	8^{M}	31
32	(United States) Grady Willingham	(United States) Orbit	14										29
32	(United States) Grady Willingham	(Germany) Seikel Motorsport										7	29
33	(United States) Vic Rice	(United States) The Racer's Group		11^{M}						4^{M}	8*		28
33	(United States) Joe Policastro, Jr.	(United States) Orbit			7							10	28
35	(Germany) Marc Lieb	(United States) Alex Job Racing	9									**14**	27
35	(United States) Craig Stanton	(France) XL Racing				7^{M}						13^{M}	27
37	(United States) B. J. Zacharias	(United States) The Racer's Group			1^{M}								26
38	(Italy) Fabio Babini	(United Kingdom) P.K. Sport	3^{M}										25
39	(United Kingdom) Robin Liddell	(United Kingdom) P.K. Sport	3									17*	24
40	(United States) Robert Nagel	(United States) The Racer's Group	4										22
40	(United States) Jim Pace	(United States) The Racer's Group	4										22
40	(United Kingdom) Marino Franchitti	(United States) MSB Motorsport	21										22
40	(United Kingdom) Marino Franchitti	(United States) The Racer's Group		**2^{M}**									22
43	(United States) Keith Alexander	(United Kingdom) P.K. Sport	5^{M}										21
43	(United Kingdom) Piers Masarati	(United Kingdom) P.K. Sport	5									17*^{M}	21
45	(United Kingdom) Basil Demeroutis	(United Kingdom) P.K. Sport	5										20
45	(United States) Joe Foster	(United Kingdom) P.K. Sport										6^{M}	20
47	(United States) Mike Borkowski	(United States) Orbit	6										19
47	(Germany) André Ahrlé	(France) 917 Racing Team	7^{M}										19
47	(Austria) Philipp Peter	(United Kingdom) P.K. Sport										6	19
50	(Italy) Alex Caffi	(Germany) Seikel Motorsport	8^{M}										18
50	(France) Bernard Simmenauer	(France) 917 Racing Team	7										18
50	(France) Hervé Clément	(France) 917 Racing Team	7										18
50	(Canada) Stephane Veilleux	(Canada) Porschehaus Racing		DNS			DNP	4^{M}					18
54	(Italy) Gabrio Rosa	(Germany) Seikel Motorsport	8										17
54	(Italy) Luca Riccitelli	(Germany) Seikel Motorsport	8										17
54	(Canada) Jean-Francois Dumoulin	(Canada) Porschehaus Racing						4					17
54	(United States) Jeffrey Pabst	(Germany) Seikel Motorsport							4				17
54	(United States) Boris Said	(United States) Alegra Motorsports										8	17
54	(Monaco) Stéphane Ortelli	(United States) Cirtek Motorsport										9^{M}	17
60	(United States) Chip Vance	(Germany) Freisinger Motorsport	10^{M}										16
60	(France) Christophe Bouchut	(United States) Cirtek Motorsport										9	16
62	(Italy) Andrea Garbagnati	(France) JMB Racing	11^{M}										15
62	(United States) Stephen Southard	(Germany) Freisinger Motorsport	10										15
62	(France) Georges Forgeois	(Germany) Freisinger Motorsport	10										15
62	(United States) John Lloyd	(United States) Orbit				5							15
62	(United States) Joe Policastro, Sr.	(United States) Orbit										10	15
62	(France) Boris Derichebourg	(France) Perspective USA										11^{M}	15
68	(United States) Joe Vannini	(France) JMB Racing	11										14
68	(Brazil) Oswaldo Negri, Jr.	(France) JMB Racing	11										14
68	(United Kingdom) Terry Rymer	(United Kingdom) Harlow Motorsport - Ricardo	12^{M}										14
68	(Belgium) Michel Neugarten	(France) Perspective USA									7^{M}		14
68	(United States) Ron Atapattu	(United States) Orbit									6		14
68	(Philippines) Angelo Barretto	(France) Perspective USA									7*	11	14
68	(France) Thierry Perrier	(France) Perspective USA									7*	11	14
68	(United Kingdom) Bart Hayden	(United Kingdom) Sebah	18*									12^{M}	14
76	(United Kingdom) Mike Youles	(United Kingdom) Harlow Motorsport - Ricardo	12										13
76	(New Zealand) Rob Wilson	(United States) Cirtek Motorsport	13^{M}										13
76	(Italy) Stefano Buttiero	(France) XL Racing				7							13
76	(United States) Cory Friedman	(United States) Front Porch Racing, Inc.					8^{M}						13
76	(United States) Dave Standridge	(United States) Rennwerks Motorsports								8^{M}			13
76	(United Kingdom) Richard Dean	(United Kingdom) Sebah										12	13
76	(Germany) Jürgen von Gartzen	(United Kingdom) Sebah										12	13
83	(United States) Thomas Soriano	(United States) Front Porch Racing, Inc.					8						12
83	(United States) Richard Steranka	(United States) Rennwerks Motorsports								8			12
83	(France) Gilles Vannelet	(France) XL Racing										13	12
86	(Netherlands) Peter Kox	(Netherlands) Spyker Squadron	15^{M}										11
86	(United States) Selby Wellman	(United States) Speedsource					10^{M}						11
88	(United States) Derek Hill	(Netherlands) Spyker Squadron	15										10
88	(Netherlands) Hans Hugenholtz	(Netherlands) Spyker Squadron	15										10
88	(United States) Paul Mears, Jr.	(United States) Speedsource					10						10
91	(United States) Robert Orcutt	(United States) The Racer's Group		11									9
92	(Italy) Andrea Montermini	(France) JMB Racing	19*^{M}										1
-	(Canada) Sylvain Tremblay	(United States) Speedsource					10*						0
-	(United Kingdom) Paul Dawson	(United States) Cirtek Motorsport	13*										0
-	(United States) Nick Longhi	(United States) Alegra Motorsports										15*	0
-	(United States) Chris McMurry	(United States) J3 Racing										16*	0
-	(United Kingdom) Gavin Pickering	(United Kingdom) P.K. Sport										17*	0
-	(United Kingdom) Stephen Earle	(United Kingdom) Sebah	18*										0
-	(United Kingdom) Mark Griffiths	(United Kingdom) Sebah	18*										0
-	(United States) Peter Argetsinger	(France) JMB Racing	19*										0
-	(United States) Ryan Hunter-Reay	(France) JMB Racing	19*										0
-	(France) Romain Dumas	(Germany) Freisinger Motorsport	20*										0
-	(Portugal) Ni Amorim	(Germany) Freisinger Motorsport	20*										0
-	(Germany) Hans Fertl	(Germany) Freisinger Motorsport	20*										0
-	(Canada) Peter Overing	(Canada) Porschehaus Racing		DNS			DNP						0
Pos.	Driver	Team	SEB (United States)	SON (United States)	MOH (United States)	ROA (United States)	D.C. (United States)	TRO (Canada)	MOS (Canada)	LAG (United States)	MIA (United States)	ATL (United States)	Pts.

==== GT Teams Championship ====
Teams only score the points of their highest finishing entry in each race.

Pos.	Team	No.	SEB (United States)	SON (United States)	MOH (United States)	ROA (United States)	D.C. (United States)	TRO (Canada)	MOS (Canada)	LAG (United States)	MIA (United States)	ATL (United States)	Pts.
1	(United States) Alex Job Racing	22	9	3	2	1	3	2	6	7	2	**14**	250
1	(United States) Alex Job Racing	23	**1**	1	**9**	**2**	**1**	**1**	**3**	**1**	**1**	1	250
2	(United States) The Racer's Group	66	17	**2**	1	3	2	3	1	3	3	5	210
2	(United States) The Racer's Group	67	4	11			4		5	4	8	DNP	210
3	(United States) Orbit	42	14	6	7	5	6				6	10	165
3	(United States) Orbit	43	6	5	6	6	12	5	2	5	5	4	165
4	(Germany) Seikel Motorsport	52	2	8		4			4	6		7	104
4	(Germany) Seikel Motorsport	53	8										104
5	(United States) J3 Racing	79	16	4	3	9	9			9	4	16	86
6	(Canada) Porschehaus Racing	88		DNS		DNP	DNP	4					79
6	(Canada) Porschehaus Racing	89		7	5	8	11	8	7				79
7	(United States) Alegra Motorsports	10					7	6			10	15	55
7	(United States) Alegra Motorsports	40					13	7			9	8	55
8	(United States) Petersen Motorsports	31		9	8	DSQ						2	49
9	(United States) Risi Competizione	35								2		3	45
10	(United Kingdom) P.K. Sport	60	3									6	43
10	(United Kingdom) P.K. Sport	61	5									17	43
11	(United States) Schumacher Racing	99		10	4		5						42
12	(United States) Cirtek Motorsport	99/98	13									9	28
13	(France) Perspective USA	21									7	11	27
14	(France) XL Racing	34				7						13	25
15	(France) 917 Racing Team	85	7										18
16	(Germany) Freisinger Motorsport	57	20										15
16	(Germany) Freisinger Motorsport	58	10										15
17	(France) JMB Racing	31	19										14
17	(France) JMB Racing	32	11										14
18	(United Kingdom) Harlow Motorsport - Ricardo	65	12										13
18	(United Kingdom) Sebah	29	18									12	13
20	(United States) Front Porch Racing, Inc.	07					8						12
20	(United States) Rennwerks Motorsports	83								8			12
22	(Netherlands) Spyker Squadron	12	15										10
22	(United States) Speedsource	70					10						10
-	(United States) MSB Motorsport	33	21										0
Pos.	Team		SEB (United States)	SON (United States)	MOH (United States)	ROA (United States)	D.C. (United States)	TRO (Canada)	MOS (Canada)	LAG (United States)	MIA (United States)	ATL (United States)	Pts.
