= 2002 Grand Prix de Trois-Rivières =

The 2002 Grand Prix de Trois-Rivières was the sixth round of the 2002 American Le Mans Series season. It took place on a temporary street circuit known as Circuit Trois-Rivières in Quebec, on August 3, 2002.

== Official results ==
Class winners in bold.

| Pos | Class | No | Team | Drivers | Chassis | Tyre | Laps |
| Pos | Class | No | Team | Drivers | Engine | Tyre | Laps |
|---|---|---|---|---|---|---|---|
| 1 | **LMP900** | **2** | **(Germany) Audi Sport North America** | **(Denmark) Tom Kristensen (Italy) Rinaldo Capello** | **Audi R8** | MI | **166** |
| 1 | **LMP900** | **2** | **(Germany) Audi Sport North America** | **(Denmark) Tom Kristensen (Italy) Rinaldo Capello** | **Audi 3.6L Turbo V8** | MI | **166** |
| 2 | LMP900 | 1 | (Germany) Audi Sport North America | (Italy) Emanuele Pirro (Germany) Frank Biela | Audi R8 | MI | 166 |
| 2 | LMP900 | 1 | (Germany) Audi Sport North America | (Italy) Emanuele Pirro (Germany) Frank Biela | Audi 3.6L Turbo V8 | MI | 166 |
| 3 | LMP900 | 38 | (United States) Champion Racing | (United Kingdom) Johnny Herbert (Sweden) Stefan Johansson | Audi R8 | MI | 165 |
| 3 | LMP900 | 38 | (United States) Champion Racing | (United Kingdom) Johnny Herbert (Sweden) Stefan Johansson | Audi 3.6L Turbo V8 | MI | 165 |
| 4 | LMP900 | 51 | (United States) Panoz Motor Sports | (United States) Bryan Herta (United States) Bill Auberlen | Panoz LMP01 Evo | MI | 162 |
| 4 | LMP900 | 51 | (United States) Panoz Motor Sports | (United States) Bryan Herta (United States) Bill Auberlen | Élan 6L8 6.0L V8 | MI | 162 |
| 5 | **GTS** | **4** | **(United States) Corvette Racing** | **(United States) Andy Pilgrim (United States) Kelly Collins** | **Chevrolet Corvette C5-R** | G | **155** |
| 5 | **GTS** | **4** | **(United States) Corvette Racing** | **(United States) Andy Pilgrim (United States) Kelly Collins** | **Chevrolet 7.0L V8** | G | **155** |
| 6 | LMP900 | 50 | (United States) Panoz Motor Sports | (Australia) David Brabham (Denmark) Jan Magnussen | Panoz LMP01 Evo | MI | 154 |
| 6 | LMP900 | 50 | (United States) Panoz Motor Sports | (Australia) David Brabham (Denmark) Jan Magnussen | Élan 6L8 6.0L V8 | MI | 154 |
| 7 | GTS | 3 | (United States) Corvette Racing | (Canada) Ron Fellows (United States) Johnny O'Connell | Chevrolet Corvette C5-R | G | 153 |
| 7 | GTS | 3 | (United States) Corvette Racing | (Canada) Ron Fellows (United States) Johnny O'Connell | Chevrolet 7.0L V8 | G | 153 |
| 8 | GTS | 0 | (Italy) Team Olive Garden | (Italy) Mimmo Schiattarella (Italy) Emanuele Naspetti | Ferrari 550 Maranello | MI | 152 |
| 8 | GTS | 0 | (Italy) Team Olive Garden | (Italy) Mimmo Schiattarella (Italy) Emanuele Naspetti | Ferrari 6.0L V12 | MI | 152 |
| 9 | **GT** | **23** | **(United States) Alex Job Racing** | **(Germany) Sascha Maassen (Germany) Lucas Luhr** | **Porsche 911 GT3-RS** | MI | **151** |
| 9 | **GT** | **23** | **(United States) Alex Job Racing** | **(Germany) Sascha Maassen (Germany) Lucas Luhr** | **Porsche 3.6L Flat-6** | MI | **151** |
| 10 | GT | 22 | (United States) Alex Job Racing | (Germany) Timo Bernhard (Germany) Jörg Bergmeister | Porsche 911 GT3-RS | MI | 151 |
| 10 | GT | 22 | (United States) Alex Job Racing | (Germany) Timo Bernhard (Germany) Jörg Bergmeister | Porsche 3.6L Flat-6 | MI | 151 |
| 11 | LMP900 | 16 | (United States) Dyson Racing Team | (United States) Chris Dyson (United Kingdom) James Weaver | Riley & Scott Mk III | G | 148 |
| 11 | LMP900 | 16 | (United States) Dyson Racing Team | (United States) Chris Dyson (United Kingdom) James Weaver | Lincoln (Élan) 6.0L V8 | G | 148 |
| 12 | GT | 66 | (United States) The Racer's Group | (United States) Kevin Buckler (United States) Michael Shrom | Porsche 911 GT3-RS | MI | 147 |
| 12 | GT | 66 | (United States) The Racer's Group | (United States) Kevin Buckler (United States) Michael Shrom | Porsche 3.6L Flat-6 | MI | 147 |
| 13 | GT | 88 | (Canada) Porschehaus Racing | (Canada) Stephane Veilleux (Canada) Jean-François Dumoulin | Porsche 911 GT3-R | D | 146 |
| 13 | GT | 88 | (Canada) Porschehaus Racing | (Canada) Stephane Veilleux (Canada) Jean-François Dumoulin | Porsche 3.6L Flat-6 | D | 146 |
| 14 | **LMP675** | **56** | **(United States) Team Bucknum Racing** | **(United States) Jeff Bucknum (United States) Chris McMurry (United States) Bryan Willman** | **Pilbeam MP84** | A | **145** |
| 14 | **LMP675** | **56** | **(United States) Team Bucknum Racing** | **(United States) Jeff Bucknum (United States) Chris McMurry (United States) Bryan Willman** | **Nissan (AER) VQL 3.4L V6** | A | **145** |
| 15 DNF | LMP675 | 13 | (United States) Archangel Motorsports | (Canada) Marc-Antoine Camirand (United Kingdom) Ben Devlin | Lola B2K/40 | D | 142 |
| 15 DNF | LMP675 | 13 | (United States) Archangel Motorsports | (Canada) Marc-Antoine Camirand (United Kingdom) Ben Devlin | Ford (Millington) 2.0L Turbo I4 | D | 142 |
| 16 | LMP675 | 19 | (United States) Essex Racing | (Canada) Melanie Paterson (Canada) Paul Fix | Lola B2K/40 | D | 139 |
| 16 | LMP675 | 19 | (United States) Essex Racing | (Canada) Melanie Paterson (Canada) Paul Fix | Nissan (AER) VQL 3.0L V6 | D | 139 |
| 17 | LMP900 | 30 | (United States) Intersport | (United States) Andy Lally (United States) John Macaluso | Lola B2K/10B | G | 132 |
| 17 | LMP900 | 30 | (United States) Intersport | (United States) Andy Lally (United States) John Macaluso | Judd GV4 4.0L V10 | G | 132 |
| 18 | GT | 43 | (United States) Orbit | (United States) Leo Hindery (United States) Peter Baron | Porsche 911 GT3-RS | MI | 117 |
| 18 | GT | 43 | (United States) Orbit | (United States) Leo Hindery (United States) Peter Baron | Porsche 3.6L Flat-6 | MI | 117 |
| 19 | GTS | 45 | (United States) American Viperacing | (United Kingdom) Marino Franchitti (United States) Marc Bunting | Dodge Viper GTS-R | P | 109 |
| 19 | GTS | 45 | (United States) American Viperacing | (United Kingdom) Marino Franchitti (United States) Marc Bunting | Dodge 8.0L V10 | P | 109 |
| 20 DNF | GTS | 44 | (United States) American Viperacing | (United States) Kevin Allen (United States) Tom Weickardt | Dodge Viper GTS-R | P | 95 |
| 20 DNF | GTS | 44 | (United States) American Viperacing | (United States) Kevin Allen (United States) Tom Weickardt | Dodge 8.0L V10 | P | 95 |
| 21 DNF | GT | 10 | (United States) Alegra Motorsports | (United States) Chris Gleason (United States) Emil Assentato | BMW M3 | D | 87 |
| 21 DNF | GT | 10 | (United States) Alegra Motorsports | (United States) Chris Gleason (United States) Emil Assentato | BMW 3.2L I6 | D | 87 |
| 22 DNF | GT | 40 | (United States) Alegra Motorsports | (United States) Scooter Gabel (United States) Carlos DeQuesada | BMW M3 | D | 64 |
| 22 DNF | GT | 40 | (United States) Alegra Motorsports | (United States) Scooter Gabel (United States) Carlos DeQuesada | BMW 3.2L I6 | D | 64 |
| 23 DNF | GTS | 26 | (Germany) Konrad Motorsport | (Austria) Franz Konrad (United States) Terry Borcheller | Saleen S7-R | P | 49 |
| 23 DNF | GTS | 26 | (Germany) Konrad Motorsport | (Austria) Franz Konrad (United States) Terry Borcheller | Ford 7.0L V8 | P | 49 |
| 24 DNF | LMP675 | 37 | (United States) Intersport | (United States) Jon Field (United States) Clint Field | MG-Lola EX257 | G | 29 |
| 24 DNF | LMP675 | 37 | (United States) Intersport | (United States) Jon Field (United States) Clint Field | MG (AER) XP20 2.0L Turbo I4 | G | 29 |
| 25 DNF | GT | 89 | (Canada) Porschehaus Racing | (Canada) Robert Julien (United States) Adam Merzon | Porsche 911 GT3-RS | D | 25 |
| 25 DNF | GT | 89 | (Canada) Porschehaus Racing | (Canada) Robert Julien (United States) Adam Merzon | Porsche 3.6L Flat-6 | D | 25 |
| 26 DNF | LMP675 | 11 | (United States) KnightHawk Racing | (United States) Chad Block (United States) Steven Knight | MG-Lola EX257 | A | 0 |
| 26 DNF | LMP675 | 11 | (United States) KnightHawk Racing | (United States) Chad Block (United States) Steven Knight | MG (AER) XP20 2.0L Turbo I4 | A | 0 |

== Statistics ==
- Pole Position - #1 Audi Sport North America - 0:58.698
- Fastest Lap - #1 Audi Sport North America - 0:59.568
- Distance - 406.337 km
- Average Speed - 135.214 km/h

American Le Mans Series
| Previous race: 2002 Grand Prix of Washington D.C. | 2002 season | Next race: 2002 Grand Prix of Mosport |
