= 2002 Grand Prix of Washington D.C. =

Car race in Washington, D.C.

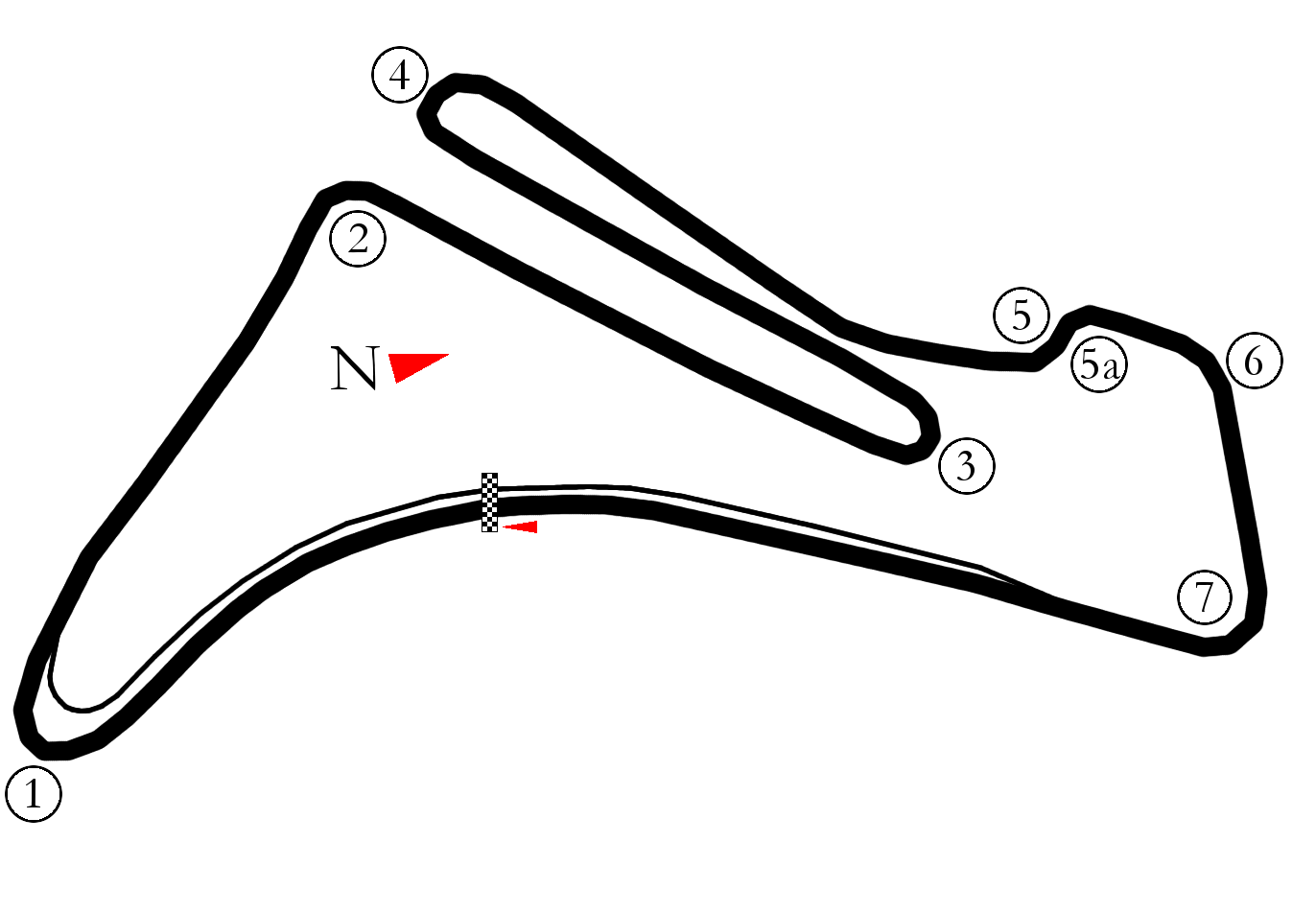
Track map.

The 2002 Cadillac Grand Prix of Washington, D.C. was the fifth round of the 2002 American Le Mans Series season. It took place in a 1.66 mi (2.67 km) temporary street circuit set around the streets and parking lot adjacent to Robert F. Kennedy Memorial Stadium in Washington, D.C., on July 21, 2002.

The venue was not renewed for another season due to complaints from neighbors about noise and the race was the only event of its kind held in Washington. The event was supposed to be a recurring event, as the planners entered into a 10-year contract with the city. Before the 2002 Grand Prix, Washington had not been home to an auto racing event for 80 years, and it would not host another until the 2026 Freedom 250 Grand Prix. However, nine years later in 2011, nearby Baltimore hosted an American Le Mans Series grand prix event, the Baltimore Grand Prix, which took place in the Inner Harbor area of the city along the waterfront. Baltimore went on to host several future events.

== Official results ==
Class winners in bold.

Pos	Class	No	Team	Drivers	Chassis	Tyre	Laps
Pos	Class	No	Team	Drivers	Engine	Tyre	Laps
1	**LMP900**	**50**	**(United States) Panoz Motor Sports**	**(Australia) David Brabham (Denmark) Jan Magnussen**	**Panoz LMP01 Evo**	M	**140**
1	**LMP900**	**50**	**(United States) Panoz Motor Sports**	**(Australia) David Brabham (Denmark) Jan Magnussen**	**Élan 6L8 6.0L V8**	M	**140**
2	LMP900	2	(Germany) Audi Sport North America	(Denmark) Tom Kristensen (Italy) Rinaldo Capello	Audi R8	M	140
2	LMP900	2	(Germany) Audi Sport North America	(Denmark) Tom Kristensen (Italy) Rinaldo Capello	Audi 3.6L Turbo V8	M	140
3	LMP900	1	(Germany) Audi Sport North America	(Italy) Emanuele Pirro (Germany) Frank Biela	Audi R8	M	140
3	LMP900	1	(Germany) Audi Sport North America	(Italy) Emanuele Pirro (Germany) Frank Biela	Audi 3.6L Turbo V8	M	140
4	LMP900	8	(United States) Team Cadillac	(Italy) Max Angelelli (France) Christophe Tinseau	Cadillac Northstar LMP02	M	139
4	LMP900	8	(United States) Team Cadillac	(Italy) Max Angelelli (France) Christophe Tinseau	Cadillac Northstar 4.0L Turbo V8	M	139
5	LMP900	38	(United States) Champion Racing	(United Kingdom) Johnny Herbert (Sweden) Stefan Johansson	Audi R8	M	138
5	LMP900	38	(United States) Champion Racing	(United Kingdom) Johnny Herbert (Sweden) Stefan Johansson	Audi 3.6L Turbo V8	M	138
6	LMP900	51	(United States) Panoz Motor Sports	(United States) Bryan Herta (United States) Bill Auberlen	Panoz LMP01 Evo	M	138
6	LMP900	51	(United States) Panoz Motor Sports	(United States) Bryan Herta (United States) Bill Auberlen	Élan 6L8 6.0L V8	M	138
7	LMP900	16	(United States) Dyson Racing Team	(United States) Chris Dyson (United Kingdom) James Weaver	Riley & Scott Mk III	G	133
7	LMP900	16	(United States) Dyson Racing Team	(United States) Chris Dyson (United Kingdom) James Weaver	Lincoln (Élan) 6.0L V8	G	133
8	**GTS**	**3**	**(United States) Corvette Racing**	**(Canada) Ron Fellows (United States) Johnny O'Connell**	**Chevrolet Corvette C5-R**	G	**131**
8	**GTS**	**3**	**(United States) Corvette Racing**	**(Canada) Ron Fellows (United States) Johnny O'Connell**	**Chevrolet 7.0L V8**	G	**131**
9	GTS	4	(United States) Corvette Racing	(United States) Andy Pilgrim (United States) Kelly Collins	Chevrolet Corvette C5-R	G	130
9	GTS	4	(United States) Corvette Racing	(United States) Andy Pilgrim (United States) Kelly Collins	Chevrolet 7.0L V8	G	130
10	GTS	0	(Italy) Team Olive Garden	(Italy) Mimmo Schiattarella (Italy) Emanuele Naspetti	Ferrari 550 Maranello	M	129
10	GTS	0	(Italy) Team Olive Garden	(Italy) Mimmo Schiattarella (Italy) Emanuele Naspetti	Ferrari 6.0L V12	M	129
11	GTS	26	(Germany) Konrad Motorsport	(Austria) Franz Konrad (United States) Terry Borcheller	Saleen S7-R	P	128
11	GTS	26	(Germany) Konrad Motorsport	(Austria) Franz Konrad (United States) Terry Borcheller	Ford 7.0L V8	P	128
12	**LMP675**	**37**	**(United States) Intersport**	**(United States) Jon Field (United States) Clint Field**	**MG-Lola EX257**	G	**127**
12	**LMP675**	**37**	**(United States) Intersport**	**(United States) Jon Field (United States) Clint Field**	**MG (AER) XP20 2.0L Turbo I4**	G	**127**
13	**GT**	**23**	**(United States) Alex Job Racing**	**(Germany) Sascha Maassen (Germany) Lucas Luhr**	**Porsche 911 GT3-RS**	M	**125**
13	**GT**	**23**	**(United States) Alex Job Racing**	**(Germany) Sascha Maassen (Germany) Lucas Luhr**	**Porsche 3.6L Flat-6**	M	**125**
14	GT	66	(United States) The Racer's Group	(United States) Kevin Buckler (United States) Brian Cunningham	Porsche 911 GT3-RS	M	125
14	GT	66	(United States) The Racer's Group	(United States) Kevin Buckler (United States) Brian Cunningham	Porsche 3.6L Flat-6	M	125
15	GT	22	(United States) Alex Job Racing	(Germany) Timo Bernhard (Germany) Jörg Bergmeister	Porsche 911 GT3-RS	M	125
15	GT	22	(United States) Alex Job Racing	(Germany) Timo Bernhard (Germany) Jörg Bergmeister	Porsche 3.6L Flat-6	M	125
16	GT	67	(United States) The Racer's Group	(United States) Darren Law (United States) Michael Shrom	Porsche 911 GT3-RS	M	124
16	GT	67	(United States) The Racer's Group	(United States) Darren Law (United States) Michael Shrom	Porsche 3.6L Flat-6	M	124
17	GT	99	(United States) Schumacher Racing	(United States) Larry Schumacher (United States) David Murry	Porsche 911 GT3-RS	Y	120
17	GT	99	(United States) Schumacher Racing	(United States) Larry Schumacher (United States) David Murry	Porsche 3.6L Flat-6	Y	120
18	LMP675	56	(United States) Team Bucknum Racing	(United States) Jeff Bucknum (United States) Chris McMurry (United States) Bryan Willman	Pilbeam MP84	A	119
18	LMP675	56	(United States) Team Bucknum Racing	(United States) Jeff Bucknum (United States) Chris McMurry (United States) Bryan Willman	Nissan (AER) VQL 3.4L V6	A	119
19	GT	42	(United States) Orbit	(United States) Tony Kester (United States) Gary Schultheis	Porsche 911 GT3-RS	M	119
19	GT	42	(United States) Orbit	(United States) Tony Kester (United States) Gary Schultheis	Porsche 3.6L Flat-6	M	119
20	GT	10	(United States) Alegra Motorsports	(United States) Chris Gleason (United States) Emil Assentato	BMW M3	D	118
20	GT	10	(United States) Alegra Motorsports	(United States) Chris Gleason (United States) Emil Assentato	BMW 3.2L I6	D	118
21	GT	07	(United States) Front Porch Racing	(United States) Cory Friedman (United States) Thomas Soriano	Porsche 911 GT3-R	P	115
21	GT	07	(United States) Front Porch Racing	(United States) Cory Friedman (United States) Thomas Soriano	Porsche 3.6L Flat-6	P	115
22	LMP675	13	(United States) Archangel Motorsports	(United States) Will Langhorne (United Kingdom) Ben Devlin	Lola B2K/40	D	112
22	LMP675	13	(United States) Archangel Motorsports	(United States) Will Langhorne (United Kingdom) Ben Devlin	Ford (Millington) 2.0L Turbo I4	D	112
23	GTS	44	(United States) American Viperacing	(United Kingdom) Marino Franchitti (United States) Tom Grunnah	Dodge Viper GTS-R	P	108
23	GTS	44	(United States) American Viperacing	(United Kingdom) Marino Franchitti (United States) Tom Grunnah	Dodge 8.0L V10	P	108
24 DNF	GT	79	(United States) J-3 Racing	(United States) Justin Jackson (United States) Mike Fitzgerald	Porsche 911 GT3-RS	D	85
24 DNF	GT	79	(United States) J-3 Racing	(United States) Justin Jackson (United States) Mike Fitzgerald	Porsche 3.6L Flat-6	D	85
25	LMP900	30	(United States) Intersport	(United States) Andy Lally (Venezuela) Milka Duno	Lola B2K/10B	G	82
25	LMP900	30	(United States) Intersport	(United States) Andy Lally (Venezuela) Milka Duno	Judd GV4 4.0L V10	G	82
26 DNF	GT	70	(United States) Speedsource	(United States) Selby Wellman (United States) Paul Mears, Jr. (Canada) Sylvain Tremblay	Porsche 911 GT3-R	D	73
26 DNF	GT	70	(United States) Speedsource	(United States) Selby Wellman (United States) Paul Mears, Jr. (Canada) Sylvain Tremblay	Porsche 3.6L Flat-6	D	73
27 DNF	GT	89	(Canada) Porschehaus Racing	(Canada) Robert Julien (United States) Adam Merzon	Porsche 911 GT3-RS	D	73
27 DNF	GT	89	(Canada) Porschehaus Racing	(Canada) Robert Julien (United States) Adam Merzon	Porsche 3.6L Flat-6	D	73
28 DNF	GT	43	(United States) Orbit	(United States) Leo Hindery (United States) Peter Baron	Porsche 911 GT3-RS	M	52
28 DNF	GT	43	(United States) Orbit	(United States) Leo Hindery (United States) Peter Baron	Porsche 3.6L Flat-6	M	52
29 DNF	LMP900	7	(United States) Team Cadillac	(France) Emmanuel Collard (France) Éric Bernard	Cadillac Northstar LMP02	M	46
29 DNF	LMP900	7	(United States) Team Cadillac	(France) Emmanuel Collard (France) Éric Bernard	Cadillac Northstar 4.0L Turbo V8	M	46
30 DNF	GT	40	(United States) Alegra Motorsports	(United States) Scooter Gabel (United States) Carlos DeQuesada	BMW M3	D	44
30 DNF	GT	40	(United States) Alegra Motorsports	(United States) Scooter Gabel (United States) Carlos DeQuesada	BMW 3.2L I4	D	44
31 DNF	LMP675	11	(United States) KnightHawk Racing	(United States) Chad Block (United States) Steven Knight	MG-Lola EX257	A	36
31 DNF	LMP675	11	(United States) KnightHawk Racing	(United States) Chad Block (United States) Steven Knight	MG (AER) XP20 2.0L Turbo I4	A	36
32 DNF	GTS	45	(United States) American Viperacing	(United States) Shane Lewis (United States) Marc Bunting	Dodge Viper GTS-R	P	34
32 DNF	GTS	45	(United States) American Viperacing	(United States) Shane Lewis (United States) Marc Bunting	Dodge 8.0L V10	P	34
DNS	LMP675	77	(United States) AB Motorsport	(United States) Jimmy Adams (United States) Joe Blacker	Pilbeam MP84	A	-
DNS	LMP675	77	(United States) AB Motorsport	(United States) Jimmy Adams (United States) Joe Blacker	Nissan (AER) VQL 3.0L V6	A	-

== Statistics ==
- Pole Position - #1 Audi Sport North America - 1:03:287
- Fastest Lap - #2 Audi Sport North America - 1:03.883
- Distance - 374.237 km
- Average Speed - 136.052 km/h

American Le Mans Series
Previous race: 2002 Road America 500	2002 season	Next race: 2002 Grand Prix de Trois-Rivières
