= Mail2web =

Email retrieval service

Hostway
- Company type: Private company
- Industry: Internet services
- Founded: Toronto, Ontario (1997)
- Headquarters: Austin, Texas
- Products: Web mail, Mobile services, Microsoft Exchange, Microsoft SharePoint, Internet access
- Website: mail2web.com

Mail2web.com is an e-mail retrieval service "from any computer anywhere in the world" started in 1997 by SoftCom Technology Consulting Inc., a private company based in Toronto, Ontario, Canada. It was conceptualized and developed by Tony Yustein, first CEO and cofounder of the company. The service functions as an email application, such as Mozilla Thunderbird or Microsoft Outlook, but from a web interface.

Mail2web is used by over sixteen million users monthly in over 200 countries. It also provides a Microsoft Exchange service entitled 'mail2web.com Mobile Email' with mobile device capabilities, and a chat service, connecting users to MSN, AOL, Yahoo!, and ICQ Instant Messaging accounts.

Mail2web provides other paid Microsoft Exchange services, some of which have BlackBerry support.
