= Chris Gleason =

American racing driver (1943–2023)

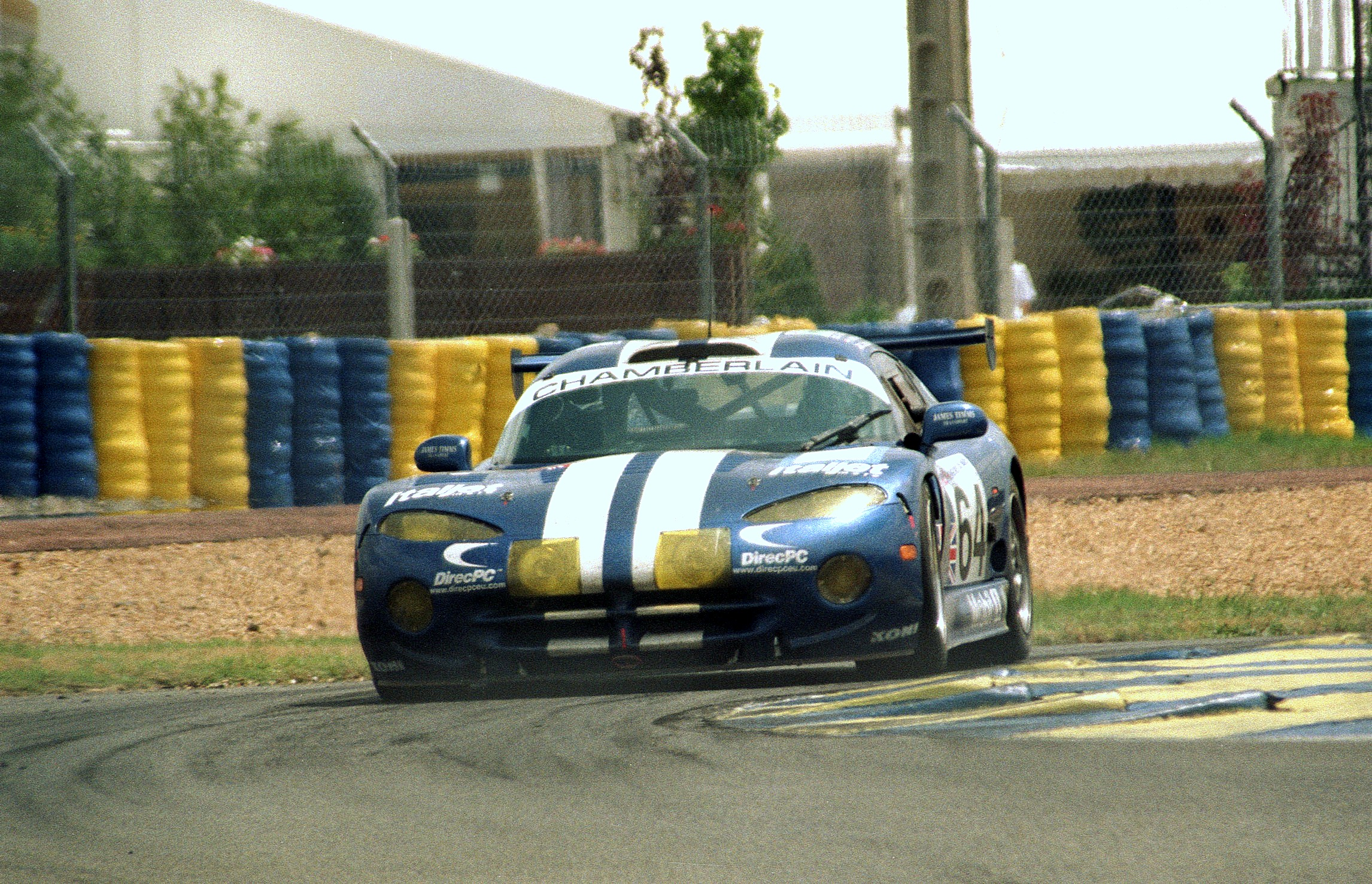
- Gleason driving in the 1997 24 Hours of Le Mans
- Nationality: American
- Born: October 12, 1943 Johnstown, Pennsylvania, U.S.
- Died: February 10, 2023 (aged 79)
- Relatives: Robert Gleason Jr.

Continental Tire Sports Car Challenge
- Years active: 2011
- Teams: APR Motorsport
- Starts: 8
- Wins: 1
- Podiums: 1
- Poles: 0
- Fastest laps: 1
- Best finish: 12th in 2011

24 Hours of Le Mans career
- Years: 1997, 1999, 2001

Chris Gleason (October 12, 1943 – February 10, 2023) was an American racing driver and politician who competed for over 50 years in various forms of racing, including the 24 Hours of Le Mans 3 times.
