= Van der Steur Racing =

American sports car racing team

(United States) van der Steur Racing
- Founded: 2000
- Founder(s): Gunnar van der Steur
- Folded: 2026
- Base: Millville, New Jersey, U.S.
- Former series: American Le Mans Series; GT America Series; GT4 America Series; IMSA SportsCar Championship; Michelin Pilot Challenge; Porsche Carrera Cup North America
- Noted drivers: (United Kingdom) Ben Devlin (France) Valentin Hasse-Clot (United States) Erik van der Steur (United States) Gunnar van der Steur (United States) Rory van der Steur (United States) Spencer Pumpelly
- Website: www.vandersteurracing.com

Van der Steur Racing (VDSR) was an American sports car racing team that competed in the IMSA SportsCar Championship and the Michelin Pilot Challenge.

The team had an ownership stake in New Jersey Motorsports Park, after it purchased assets and ownership interest from Forty7 Motorsports in 2025. In June 2026, van der Steur Racing was sold to YRB Racing, which established the Car Blanche operation in IMSA.

== History ==
=== American Le Mans Series ===
==== 2004–2005 ====
Van der Steur Racing began racing in 2004 with its debut event the 12 Hours of Sebring. Team founder Gunnar van der Steur, his brother Eric and Spencer Pumpelly competed in the LMP2 class with a Lola B2K/40-Nissan. They retired after two laps with a CV joint failure. The rest of the season went similarly, a further three retirements and a switch to Advanced Engine Research (AER) engines not helping improve the reliability of the Lola.

After missing the opening round of the 2005 American Le Mans Series season, van der Steur Racing made its first start at the Grand Prix of Atlanta with the Lola B2K/40 now re-engineered to accommodate the AER P07 engine. The team secured two second-place finishes at Lime Rock and Road America, finishing fourth in the standings.

==== 2006 ====
The team continued to campaign the now ancient Lola B2K/40 into the 2006 ALMS season with Ben Devlin and Gunnar van der Steur. They finished their first race at Houston in fourth in LMP2. Following the race, Gunnar reported that Reliant Park street circuit damaged the Lola chassis. He stated that "[i]t tore this little car to pieces" and said the team replaced some engine components and chassis bolts. They finished the race at Mid-Ohio in fifth of the five class runners. At Lime Rock, the team retired with early on with gearbox issues. After missing the next five rounds, VDSR received the Radical SR9 and completed a shakedown at Summit Point Raceway. They became the development team for the Radical on Kumho Tire, running the AER P07D engine. VDSR entered the Petit Le Mans with drivers with Devlin, Tim Greaves and van der Steur. Qualifying was extremely promising for the debutante Radical, Devlin set a time of 1:13.557 in spite of a brake cooling duct not working properly. However, the race ended shortly after the green flag fell when the AER engine dropped a valve. At the final race of the season at Laguna Seca, the team entered Devlin, Adam Pecorari and van der Steur. In the second hour, the car spun in avoidance of a cone that was kicked onto the racing surface by another competitor, collecting the No. 44 GT2 class Flying Lizard Motorsports Porsche. They retired from the race after completing 100 laps.

==== 2007 ====
2007 was to be the first full season running the Radical SR9 but a preseason crash at Summit Point and a overheating engine at Mid-Ohio delayed their first race to the sixth round at Lime Rock Park. With Pecorari and van der Steur again at the wheel they finished a trouble-free race seventh in class The duo classified eighth in class, 15 laps down at the Sports Car Challenge of Mid-Ohio. The next race they entered was at Mosport where the race ended quickly after six laps when Pecorari had a mechanical issue to the left rear of the Radical and careened into the barriers. The team entered into the season finale at Laguna Seca but withdrew before the weekend began.

==== 2008–2009 ====
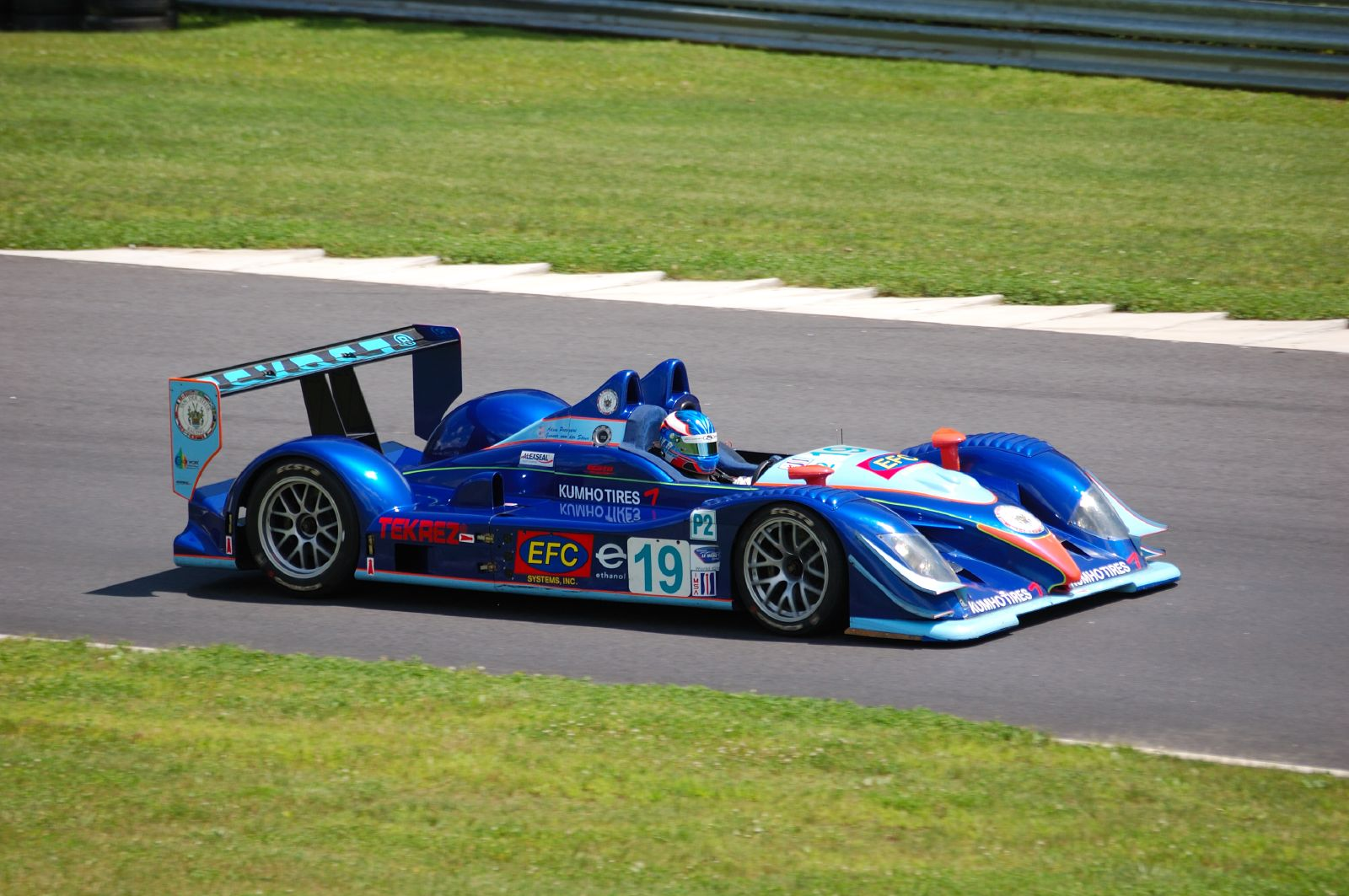
van der Steur Racing's Radical SR9 at the Northeast Grand Prix in 2009

The team only entered one round in 2008, with Robbie Pecorari joining van der Steur at St.Petersburg, where they finished eighth in class. VDSR started the 2009 season at Lime Rock, with Adam Pecorari and van der Steur finishing third in LMP2. Van der Steur reportedly drove back to their shop in Maryland to machine a new suspension component after it broke the previous day, allowing them to take part in the race. At Mid-Ohio, they finished as non-classified after contact with an ALMS Challenge class Porsche. Their next race at Mosport was an unremarkable one, finishing second on the road, before they were disqualified for failing the stall test. The final race of their season at the Petit Le Mans had van der Steur joined by Pecorari brothers (Adam and Robbie). However, they would not appear in any session that weekend and it would be their last entry until 2020.

According to Dailysportscar,

[A] member of the team left the circuit and then realized that she had left her hard card credential in the team trailer. She borrowed someone else’s card to reenter and the person at the gate noticed the discrepancy in the photos. The identification was confiscated and the team fined $500. Apparently, cool heads did not prevail, there was some sort of a standoff and the known ending was that the Van der Steur left the premises at 6 pm yesterday.

=== Michelin Pilot Challenge ===
==== 2020–2022 ====
The team made its return to IMSA competition at the final race of the 2020 Michelin Pilot Challenge season at Sebring in the TCR class. VDSR entered into the full 2021 Michelin Pilot Challenge campaign with the Hyundai Veloster N TCR. Drivers for the season were Denis Dupont and Rory van der Steur, Gunnar's son. They scored a best finish of second at Road America, placing 12th in the standings. For 2022, Tyler Gonzalez joined van der Steur in the Hyundai TCR, finishing as high as third at Laguna Seca.

==== 2023–present ====
For the 2023 Michelin Pilot Challenge season, VDSR stepped up to the GS class with an Aston Martin Vantage AMR GT4 for drivers Austin McCusker and Rory van der Steur. They were involved in a bizarre incident at the Detroit Street Circuit where Robert Megennis attempted to lap van der Steur into the hairpin. However, Megennis's BMW ran into the side of the Aston Martin and went up and over the top of the No. 19 VDSR entry, causing substantial damage to the roof and driver's side of the chassis. A podium finish at Mosport was the highest finish of the season.

In 2024, Rory van der Steur was joined by an assortment of drivers in the No. 19 Aston Martin with three podium finishes, including two runner-ups at Sebring and Mosport. They also teamed up with fellow Aston Martin competitor, Ruckus Racing, for three races. The following year, VDSR again employed a rotation of drivers across the season, yielding mediocre results, with a best finish of 13th at Road America.

=== IMSA SportsCar Championship ===
==== 2025 ====
Van der Steur Racing made its return to the highest level of US endurance racing in 2025 with two ex-Flying Lizard Motorsports Aston Martin Vantage AMR GT3 Evo chassis for the Michelin Endurance Cup (MEC). Drivers for the 24 Hours of Daytona were Valentin Hasse-Clot, Anthony McIntosh, Rory van der Steur and Maxime Robin. On their debut race in the GTD class, VDSR managed a sixth place finish. The team continued in the Endurance Cup unable to match their first result, with three retirements in the next four races. They ended the season 16th in the MEC standings.

==== 2026 ====
Midway through the season, the team announced their discontinuation of the racing program, with their car and entry taken over by YRB Racing.

== Racing record ==
=== Complete American Le Mans Series results ===
(key) (Races in bold indicate pole position; races in italics indicate fastest lap)

| Year | Entrant | Class | No | Chassis | Engine | Tyre | Drivers | 1 | 2 | 3 | 4 | 5 | 6 | 7 | 8 | 9 | 10 | 11 | 12 | Pos. | Pts |
|---|---|---|---|---|---|---|---|---|---|---|---|---|---|---|---|---|---|---|---|---|---|
| 2004 | (United States) Van der Steur Racing | LMP2 | 19 | Lola B2K/40 | Nissan (AER) VQL 3.0 L V6 | **Y** | (United States) Erik van der Steur (United States) Gunnar van der Steur (United States) Spencer Pumpelly (Round 1) (United Kingdom) Ben Devlin (Round 8) | SEB; Ret | MDO; 4 | LIM; Ret | SON | POR | MOS | ELK | PET; Ret | LAG; DNS | | | | 7th | 10 |
| 2005 | (United States) Van der Steur Racing | LMP2 | 19 | Lola B2K/40 | Nissan (AER) VQL 3.0 L V6 | **D** | (United States) Erik van der Steur (Rounds 2–3, 8–9) (United States) Gunnar van der Steur (United Kingdom) Ben Devlin | SEB | ATL; 3 | MDO; DNS | LIM; 2 | SON | POR | ELK; 2 | MOS; Ret | PET; Ret | LAG; 4 | | | 4th | 58 |
| 2006 | (United States) Van der Steur Racing | LMP2 | 19 | Lola B2K/40 (Rounds 2–4); Radical SR9 (Rounds 9–10) | Nissan (AER) VQL 3.0 L V6 (Rounds 2–4); AER P07D 2.0 L Turbo I4 (Rounds 9–10) | **D** **K** | (United States) Gunnar van der Steur (United Kingdom) Ben Devlin (United Kingdom) Tim Greaves (Round 9) (United States) Adam Pecorari (Round 10) | SEB | HOU; 4 | MDO; 5 | LIM; Ret | UTA | POR | ELK | MOS | PET; Ret | LAG; Ret | | | 5th | 18 |
| 2007 | (United States) Van der Steur Racing | LMP2 | 19 | Radical SR9 | AER P07D 2.0 L Turbo I4 | **K** | (United States) Gunnar van der Steur (United States) Adam Pecorari | SEB | STP | LBH | HOU | UTA | LIM; 7 | MDO; 8 | ELK | MOS; Ret | DET | PET | LAG; DNS | 9th | 7 |
| 2008 | (United States) Van der Steur Racing | LMP2 | 19 | Radical SR9 | AER P07D 2.0 L Turbo I4 | **K** | (United States) Gunnar van der Steur (United States) Robbie Pecorari | SEB | STP; 8 | LBH | UTA | LIM | MDO | ELK | MOS | DET | PET | LAG | | 10th | 3 |
| 2009 | (United States) Van der Steur Racing | LMP2 | 19 | Radical SR9 | AER P07D 2.0 L Turbo I4 | **K** | (United States) Gunnar van der Steur (United States) Adam Pecorari (United States) Robbie Pecorari (Round 9) | SEB | STP | LBH | UTA | LIM; 3 | MDO; NC | ELK | MOS; DSQ | PET; DNS | LAG | | | 5th | 13 |

=== Michelin Pilot Challenge results ===
(key) (Races in bold indicate pole position; races in italics indicate fastest lap)

| Year | Entrant | Class | No | Chassis | Engine | Drivers | 1 | 2 | 3 | 4 | 5 | 6 | 7 | 8 | 9 | 10 | 11 | Pos. | Pts |
|---|---|---|---|---|---|---|---|---|---|---|---|---|---|---|---|---|---|---|---|
| 2020 | (United States) van der Steur Racing | TCR | 91 | Hyundai Veloster N TCR | Hyundai Theta II 2.0 L Turbo I4 | (United States) Rory van der Steur (Costa Rica) Danny Formal | DAY | SEB1 | ELK | VIR | ATL1 | MOH | ATL2 | LGA | SEB2; 12 | | | 20th | 19 |
| 2021 | (United States) van der Steur Racing | TCR | 19 | Hyundai Veloster N TCR | Hyundai Theta II 2.0 L Turbo I4 | (United States) Rory van der Steur (Belgium) Denis Dupont | DAY; 8 | SEB; 9 | MOH; 15 | WGI1; 5 | WGI2; 13 | LIM; 13 | ELK; 2 | LGA; 5 | VIR; 9 | ATL; DNS | | 12th | 2030 |
| 2022 | (United States) van der Steur Racing | TCR | 19 | Hyundai Veloster N TCR | Hyundai Theta II 2.0 L Turbo I4 | (United States) Rory van der Steur (United States) Tyler Gonzalez | DAY; 5 | SEB; 6 | LGA; 3 | MOH; 4 | WGI; 12 | MOS; 14 | LIM; 9 | ELK; 8 | VIR; 6 | ATL; 14 | | 9th | 2320 |
| 2023 | (United States) van der Steur Racing | GS | 19 | Aston Martin Vantage AMR GT4 | Aston Martin M177 4.0 L Turbo V8 | (United States) Rory van der Steur (United States) Austin McCuskerr (United States) Wyatt Brichacek (France) Valentin Hasse-Clot | DAY; 12 | SEB; 19 | LGA; 11 | DET; 19 | WGL; 6 | MOS; 3 | LIM; TCR only | ELK; 15 | VIR; 15 | IMS; 12 | ATL; 19 | 12th | 1810 |
| 2023 | (United States) van der Steur Racing | TCR | 90 | Hyundai Veloster N TCR | Hyundai Theta II 2.0 L Turbo I4 | (United States) Rory van der Steur (United States) Luca Mars | DAY | SEB | LGA | DET | WGL | MOS | LIM; 5 | ELK | VIR | IMS | ATL | 16th | 260 |
| 2023 | (United States) van der Steur Racing | TCR | 91 | Hyundai Elantra N TCR | Hyundai Theta II 2.0 L Turbo I4 | (United States) Tyler Maxson (Puerto Rico) Bryan Ortiz | DAY | SEB; 6 | LAG; 5 | DET; GS only | WGL; 3 | MOS; 11 | LIM; 4 | ELK; 7 | VIR; 6 | IND; 6 | ATL; 2 | 6th | 2350 |
| 2024 | (United States) van der Steur Racing | GS | 19 | Aston Martin Vantage AMR GT4 Evo | Aston Martin M177 4.0 L Turbo V8 | (United States) Rory van der Steur (France) Valentin Hasse-Clot (Australia) Scott Andrews (United States) Dominic Starkweather (France) Alexandre Prémat (Costa Rica) Danny Formal | DAY; 11 | SEB; 2 | LAG; 5 | MDO; 22 | WGL; 4 | MOS; 2 | ELK; 3 | VIR; 16 | IND; 15 | ATL; 4 | | 3rd | 2360 |
| 2025 | (United States) van der Steur Racing | GS | 15 | Aston Martin Vantage AMR GT4 Evo | Aston Martin M177 4.0 L Turbo V8 | (United States) Christine Sloss (United States) Ben Sloss (United States) MHP Peters (France) Clément Mateu (United States) Glenn McGee (United States) Rory van der Steur | DAY; 18 | SEB; 22 | LAG; 17 | MDO; 21 | WGL; 14 | MOS; 15 | ELK; 13 | VIR; 20 | IND; 18 | ATL; 25 | | 16th | 1270 |
| 2025 | (United States) van der Steur Racing | GS | 82 | Aston Martin Vantage AMR GT4 Evo | Aston Martin M177 4.0 L Turbo V8 | (United States) Brady Behrman (United States) Sammy Smith | DAY; 17 | SEB | LAG | MDO | WGL | MOS | ELK | VIR | IND | ATL | | 31st | 140 |
| 2026 | (United States) van der Steur Racing 1, 3 (United States) RaceWife Racing 9 | GS | 10 | Aston Martin Vantage AMR GT4 Evo | Aston Martin M177 4.0 L Turbo V8 | (United States) Glenn McGee (United States) Ben Sloss (United States) Christine Sloss | DAY; 29 | SEB | LAG; 21 | MDO | WGL | MOS | ELK | VIR | IND; 22 | ATL | | 36th | 210 |
| 2026 | (United States) Thunder Bunny Racing 1 (United States) van der Steur Racing 2–4 (United States) Car Blanche 5–8 (United States) OORE 9–10 | GS | 66 | Aston Martin Vantage AMR GT4 Evo | Aston Martin M177 4.0 L Turbo V8 | (United States) Trenton Estep (United States) Allen Patten | DAY; 16 | SEB; 14 | LAG; 12 | MDO; 9 | WGL; 5 | MOS; 4 | ELK; 1 | VIR; 22 | IND; 31 | ATL; 20 | | 10th | 1830 |

=== Complete IMSA SportsCar Championship results ===
(key) (Races in bold indicate pole position; races in italics indicate fastest lap)

| Year | Entrant | Class | No | Chassis | Engine | Drivers | 1 | 2 | 3 | 4 | 5 | 6 | 7 | 8 | 9 | 10 | Pos. | Pts |
|---|---|---|---|---|---|---|---|---|---|---|---|---|---|---|---|---|---|---|
| 2025 | (United States) van der Steur Racing | GTD | 19 | Aston Martin Vantage AMR GT3 Evo | Aston Martin M177 4.0 L Turbo V8 | (France) Valentin Hasse-Clot (United States) Anthony McIntosh (United States) Rory van der Steur (France) Maxime Robin (Brazil) Eduardo Barrichello | DAY; 6 | SEB; 17 | LBH | LGA | WGL; 18 | MOS | ELK | VIR | IMS; 15 | ATL; 11 | 18th | 991 |
| 2026 | (United States) van der Steur Racing 1–4 (United States) Car Blanche 6, 8 | GTD | 19 1–4; 68 6, 8 | Aston Martin Vantage AMR GT3 Evo | Aston Martin M177 4.0 L Turbo V8 | (United States) Trenton Estep (United States) Rory van der Steur (United States) Marius Fossard (France) Valentin Hasse-Clot (France) Sébastien Baud (Thailand) Carl Bennett (Australia) Scott Andrews | DAY; 11 | SEB; 13 | LBH; 8 | LGA; 10 | WGL; 3 | MOS | ELK; 3 | VIR | IMS | PET | 14th | 1543 |
