= Ben Devlin (racing driver) =

British racing driver (born 1982)

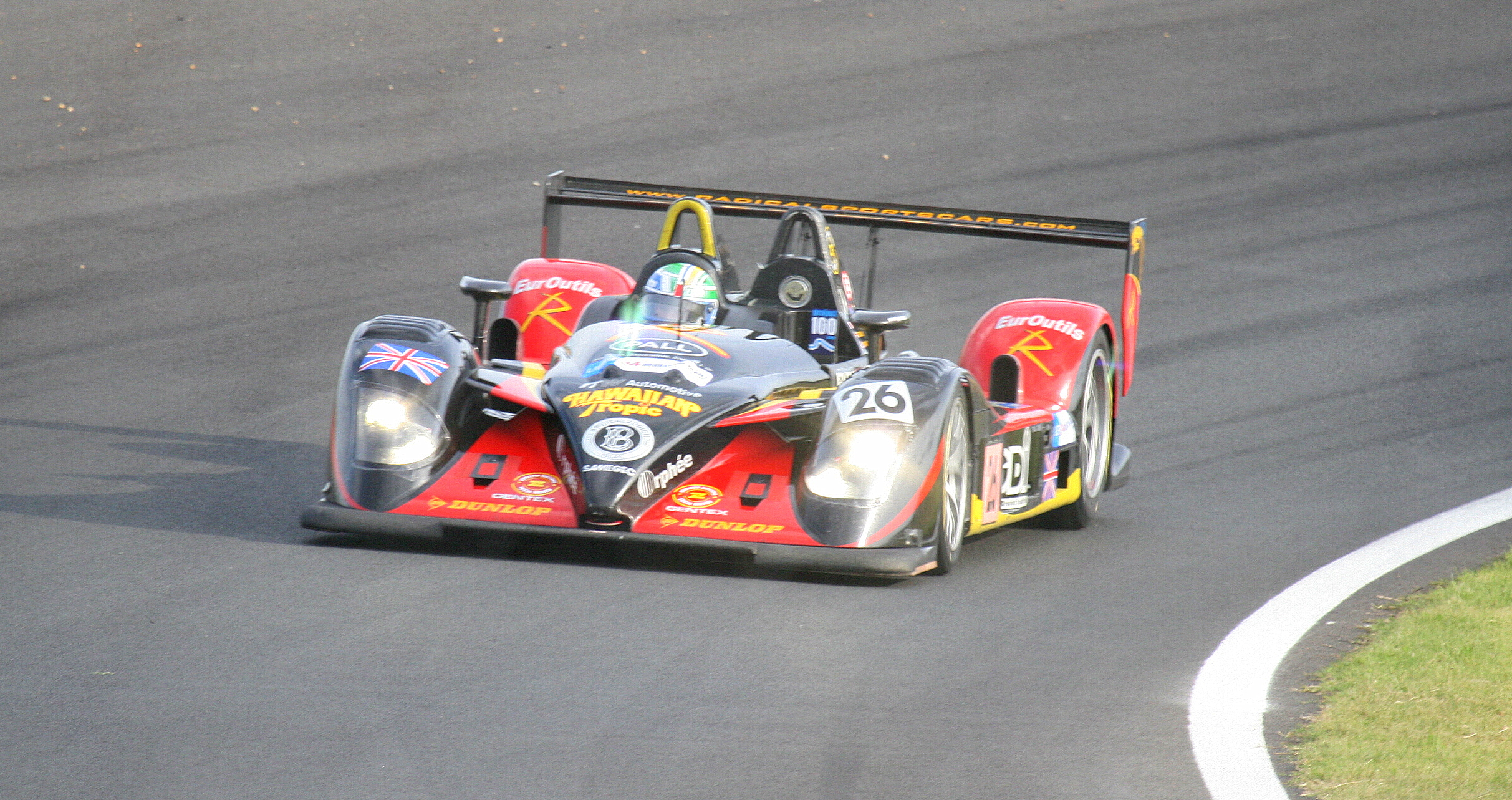
- Devlin in 2008
- Nationality: (United Kingdom) British
- Born: 8 April 1982 (age 44) Norwich, England
- Categorisation: FIA Gold

Benjamin John Devlin (born 8 April 1982) is a British businessman and racing driver. A mainstay of the LMP675 and LMP2 classes of the American Le Mans Series in the 2000s, he went on to become a Mazda factory driver in IMSA's premier prototype category.

== Business ventures ==
In 2010, Devlin and Norwich Slot Racing opened up a purpose-built slot car track in his hometown. Three years later, Devlin became the landlord of Ox and Plough, a pub founded by his grandfather Ted in 1977.

== Racing career ==
Devlin made his car racing debut in 2000, racing in the Autobytel Lotus Sport Elise series, in which he scored a lone win at Snetterton en route to a sixth-place points finish. The following year, Devlin joined Hayles Racing to compete in the GTO class of the British GT Championship, scoring a lone class podium at Donington Park before leaving he series ahead of the eighth race of the season. Moving to America for the rest of the year, Devlin joined Archangel Motorsport Services to race in the final four races of the Grand American Road Racing Championship in SRPII. In those races, Devlin won on debut at Road America and two races later at Watkins Glen, as well as finishing second in the other two races en route to a sixth-place points finish. In late 2001, Devlin also raced with the same team at Petit Le Mans, finishing second in LMP675.

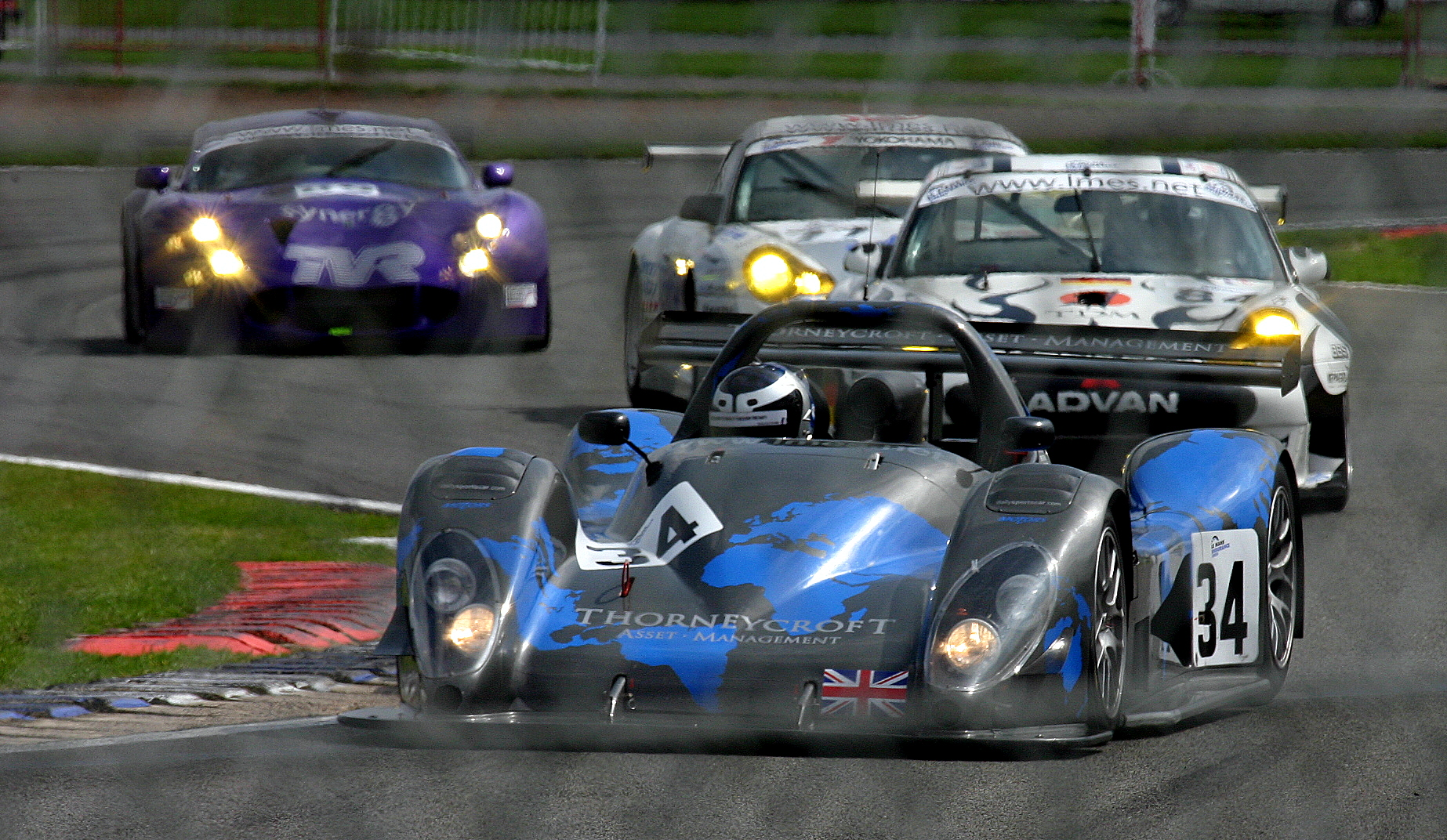
Devlin's K2 Race Pilbeam at the 2004 Silverstone 1000 km.

Returning to Archangel to race in the American Le Mans Series in LMP675 the following year, Devlin won at Sonoma and Road America, as well as five other podiums to secure runner-up honors in class despite missing one race. Devlin then made one-off appearances in the series across the following two years, racing for Marshall Cooke Racing at the 2003 12 Hours of Sebring in LMP675 and for Van der Steur Racing at the 2004 Petit Le Mans in LMP2. During 2004, Devlin also made his debut in the Le Mans Endurance Series for K2 Race Engineering at the 1000 km of Silverstone.

Continuing with Van der Steur Racing for a part-time schedule in the following year's American Le Mans Series, Devlin scored a pair of second-place finishes in class at Lime Rock and Road America, as well as a third-place at Road Atlanta as he ended the year sixth in the LMP2 standings. Remaining with the team for 2006, Devlin scored a best result of fourth at Houston in his first of five starts for the team. During 2006, Devlin also made a one-off return to the Le Mans Series for Team Bruichladdich Radical at the 1000 km of Donington.

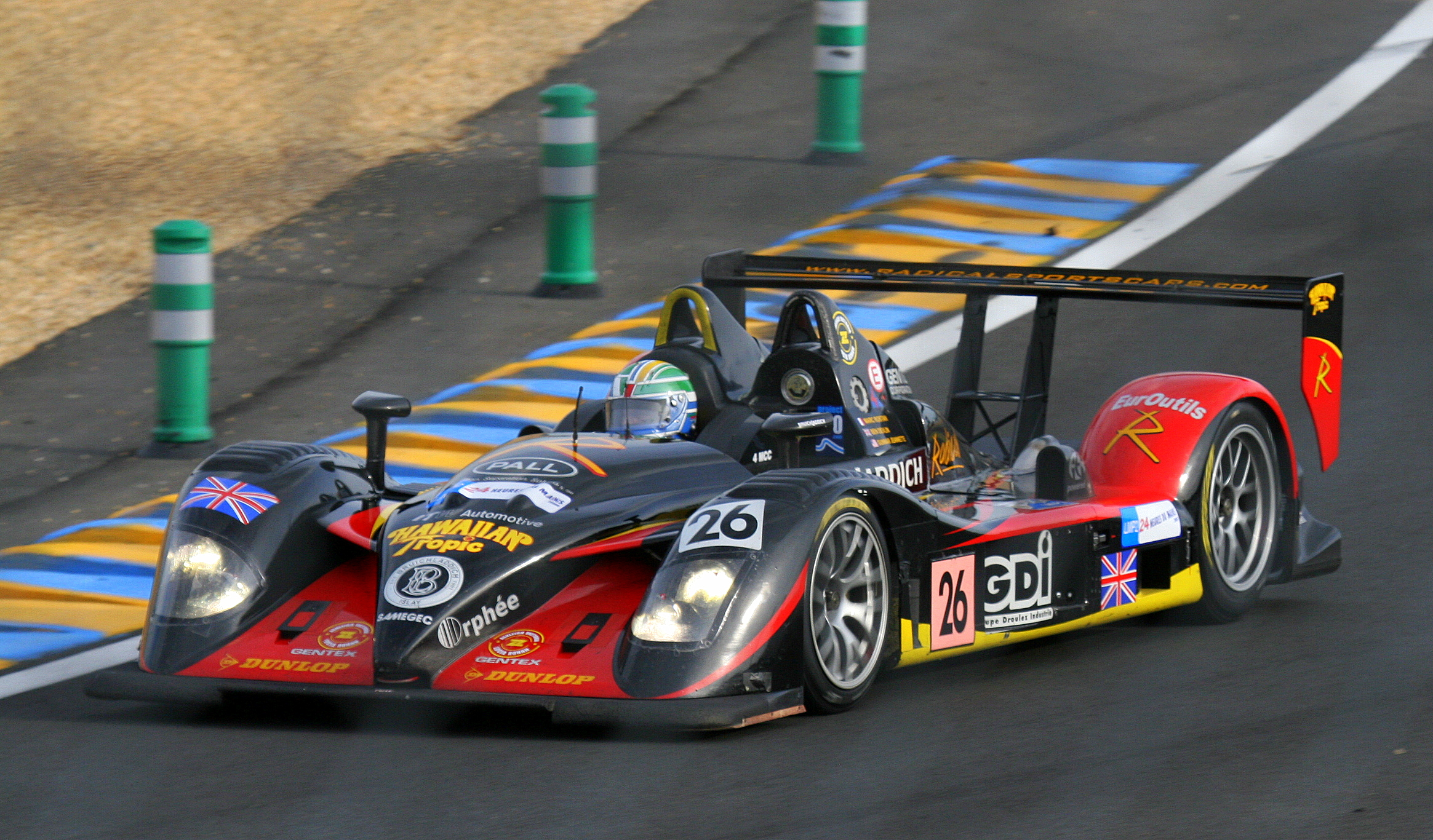
Devlin made his only Le Mans 24h start in 2008 at the wheel of a Bruichladdich Radical LMP2.

Across the following two years, Devlin drove for Mazda-engined B-K Motorsports in the LMP2 class of the American Le Mans Series, scoring a best result of fourth at the 2007 Grand Prix of Mosport and ending both years ninth and 13th in points, before the team ceased operations at the end of 2008. During 2008, Devlin also tested the Lola B08/86 ahead of its debut at that year's Petit Le Mans, as well as racing at the 24 Hours of Le Mans for Team Bruichladdich Radical, finishing sixth in LMP2 in his only start at the event. Joining Dyson Racing Team for select races of the following year's American Le Mans Series, Devlin won at Petit Le Mans and finished second at Laguna Seca to take ninth in the LMP2 standings.

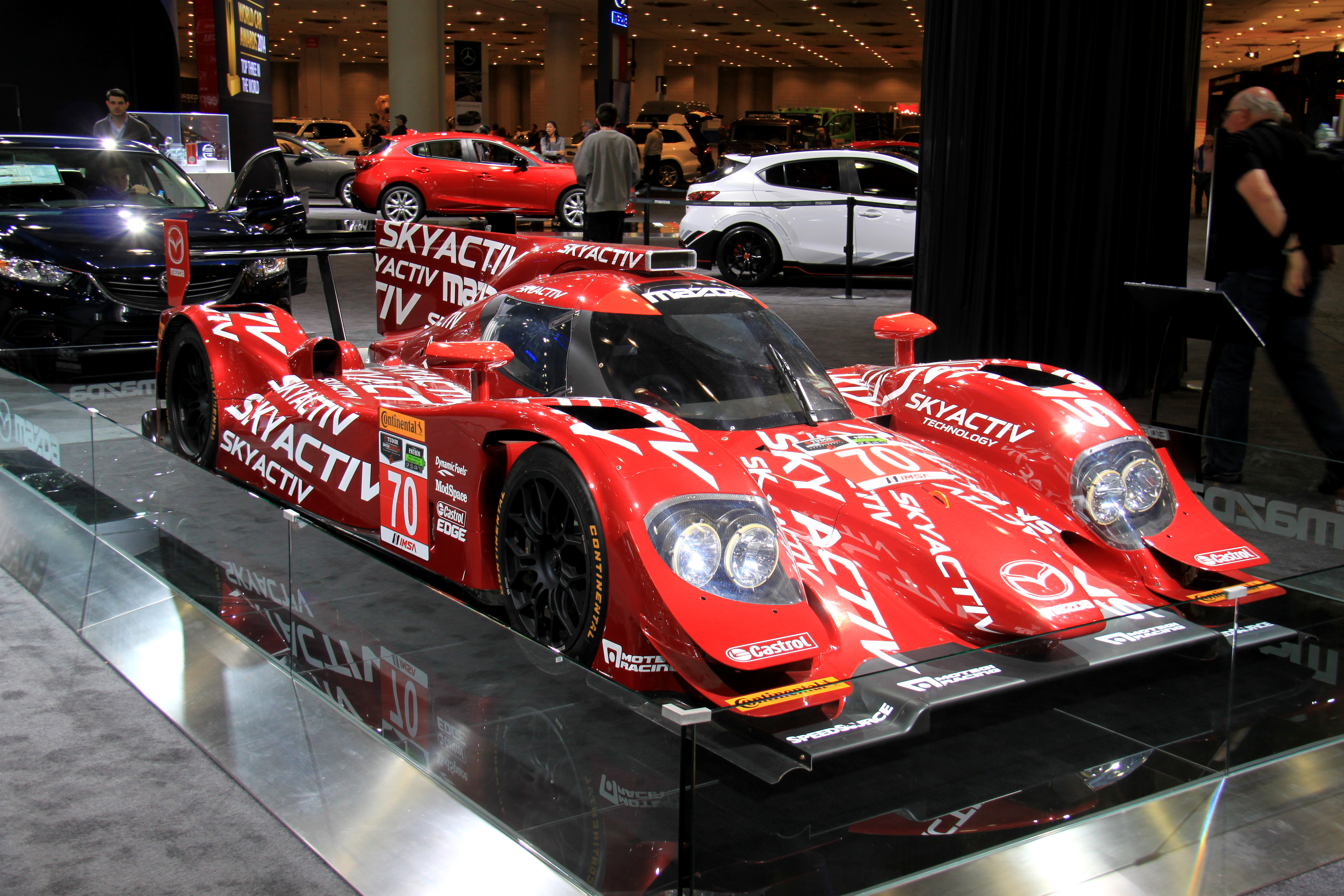
The Skyactiv Mazda Prototype, as raced by Devlin in 2014.

After finishing fourth in LMP1 at the 2010 Petit Le Mans for Intersport Racing, Devlin took a long hiatus from racing, eventually returning for select rounds of the 2014 United SportsCar Championship with Mazda factory outfit SpeedSource in the Prototype class. After scoring a best result of eighth at Petit Le Mans, Devlin returned to the team for a similar program the following year, in which he took a best result of fifth at the 6 Hours of The Glen. Devlin continued on as Mazda brought the Lola B12/80 effort in-house for 2016, in which he also scored a best result of fifth at the 6 Hours of The Glen. Following that, Devlin made a one-off appearance in the 2019 British GT Championship at Snetterton for Multimatic Motorsports in GT4, and also raced in the 2021 6 Hours of The Glen for D3+ Transformers-Dawson Racing in LMP3.

== Racing record ==
=== Racing career summary ===
Season	Series	Team	Races	Wins	Poles	F/Laps	Podiums	Points	Position
2000	Autobytel Lotus Sport Elise		12	1	2	3	3	120	6th
2001	British GT Championship – GTO	Hayles Racing	5	0	0	0	1	28	12th
2001	Grand American Road Racing Championship – SRPII	Archangel Motorsport Services	4	2	0	0	4	147	6th
2001	American Le Mans Series – LMP675	Archangel Motorsports	1	0	0	0	1	26	9th
2002	American Le Mans Series – LMP675	Archangel Motorsports	9	2	0	0	5	199	**2nd**
2003	American Le Mans Series – LMP675	Marshall Cooke Racing	1	0	0	0	0	0	NC
2004	American Le Mans Series – LMP2	Marshall Cooke Racing	0	0	0	0	0	0	NC
2004	American Le Mans Series – LMP2	Van der Steur Racing	1	0	0	0	0	0	NC
2004	Le Mans Endurance Series – LMP2	K2 Race Engineering	1	0	0	0	0	0	NC
2005	American Le Mans Series – LMP2	Van der Steur Racing	6	0	0	0	3	58	6th
2006	American Le Mans Series – LMP2	Van der Steur Racing	5	0	0	0	0	18	10th
2006	Le Mans Series – LMP2	Team Bruichladdich Radical	1	0	0	0	0	0	NC
2007	American Le Mans Series – LMP2	B-K Motorsports	12	0	0	0	0	48	9th
2008	American Le Mans Series – LMP2	B-K Motorsports	8	0	0	0	0	40	13th
2008	24 Hours of Le Mans – LMP2	Team Bruichladdich Radical	1	0	0	0	0	—N/a	6th
2009	American Le Mans Series – LMP2	Dyson Racing Team	3	1	0	0	2	30	9th
2010	American Le Mans Series – LMP	Intersport Racing	1	0	0	0	0	30	15th
2012	American Le Mans Series – LMP2	Dempsey Racing	0	0	0	0	0	0	NC
2014	United SportsCar Championship – Prototype	SpeedSource	3	0	0	0	0	46	39th
2015	United SportsCar Championship – Prototype	SpeedSource	3	0	0	0	0	69	15th
2016	IMSA SportsCar Championship – Prototype	Mazda Motorsports	3	0	0	0	0	70	20th
2019	British GT Championship – GT4 Pro-Am	Multimatic Motorsports	2	0	0	0	0	16	15th
2021	IMSA SportsCar Championship – LMP3	D3+ Transformers-Dawson Racing	1	0	0	0	0	276	28th

=== Complete British GT Championship results ===
(key) (Races in bold indicate pole position) (Races in italics indicate fastest lap)

Year	Team	Car	Class	1	2	3	4	5	6	7	8	9	10	11	12	13	Pos	Points
2001	Hayles Racing	Chrysler Viper GTS-R	GTO	SIL1; Ret	SNE; 8	DON1; 6	OUL; DNS	CRO; 7	ROC; 11	CAS; DNS	BRH1	DON2	KNO	THR	BRH2	SIL2	12th	28
2019	Multimatic Motorsports	Ford Mustang GT4	GT4 Pro-Am	OUL; 1	OUL; 2	SNE; 1; 30	SNE; 2; 25	SIL	DON1	SPA	BRH	DON2					15th	16

=== Complete Grand-Am Rolex Sports Car Series results ===
(key) (Races in bold indicate pole position; results in italics indicate fastest lap)

Year	Team	Class	Make	Engine	1	2	3	4	5	6	7	8	9	10	11	Rank	Points
2001	Archangel Motorsport Services	SRPII	Lola B2K/40	Nissan 3.0 L V6	DAY	MIA	PHX	WGL	LIM	LIM	MOH	ELK; 1	TRO; 2	WGL; 1	DAY; 2	6th	147

=== Complete American Le Mans Series results ===
(key) (Races in bold indicate pole position)

Year	Team	Class	Make	Engine	1	2	3	4	5	6	7	8	9	10	11	12	Rank	Points
2001	Archangel Motorsports	LMP675	Lola B2K/40	Nissan (AER) VQL 3.0L V6	TEX	SEB	DON	JAR	SON	POR	MOS	MOH	MON	PET; 2			9th	26
2002	Archangel Motorsports	LMP675	Lola B2K/40	Ford (Millington) 2.0 L Turbo I4	SEB	SON; 1	MOH; 2	ELK; 1	WAS; 3	TRO; 2	MOS; 3	LGA; 4	MIA; 4	PET; 2			2nd	199
2003	Marshall Cooke Racing	LMP675	Lola B2K/40	Ford (Millington) 2.0 L Turbo I4	SEB; Ret	ATL	SON	TRO	MOS	ELK	LGA	MIA	PET				NC	0
2004	Marshall Cooke Racing	LMP2	Lola B2K/40	Nissan (AER) VQL 3.0L V6	SEB	MOH	LIM	SON	POR	MOS	ELK	PET; DNS					NC	0
2004	Van der Steur Racing	LMP2	Lola B2K/40	Nissan (AER) VQL 3.0L V6								PET; Ret	LGA; DNS				NC	0
2005	Van der Steur Racing	LMP2	Lola B2K/40	Nissan (AER) VQL 3.0L V6	SEB	ATL; 3	MOH; DNS	LIM; 2	SON	POR	ELK; 2	MOS; Ret	PET; Ret	LGA; 4			6th	58
2006	Van der Steur Racing	LMP2	Lola B2K/40	Nissan (AER) VQL 3.0L V6	SEB	TEX; 4	MOH; 5	LIM; Ret	UTA	POR	ELK	MOS					10th	18
2006	Van der Steur Racing	LMP2	Radical SR9	AER P07 2.0L Turbo I4									PET; Ret	LGA; Ret			10th	18
2007	B-K Motorsports	LMP2	Lola B07/46	Mazda MZR-R 2.0L Turbo I4	SEB; Ret	STP; Ret	LBH; 8	TEX; 8	UTA; Ret	LIM; 8	MOH; Ret	ELK; 8	MOS; 4	DET; 6	PET; 7	LGA; 7	9th	48
2008	B-K Motorsports	LMP2	Lola B07/46	Mazda MZR-R 2.0 L Turbo I4 (E85 ethanol)	SEB; DNS	STP; 6	LBH; 8	UTA; 8	LIM; DNS	MOH; 8	ROA; 5	MOS; 9	DET; 7				13th	40
2008	B-K Motorsports	LMP2	Lola B08/86	Mazda MZR-R 2.0 L Turbo I4 (E85 ethanol)										PET; DNS	LAG; 10		13th	40
2009	Dyson Racing Team	LMP2	Lola B08/86	Mazda MZR-R 2.0 L Turbo I4	SEB; Ret	STP	LBH; WD	UTA	LIM	MOH	ROA	MOS	PET; 1				9th	30
2009	Dyson Racing Team	LMP2	Lola B09/86	Mazda MZR-R 2.0 L Turbo I4 (Butanol)										LAG; 2			9th	30
2010	Intersport Racing	LMP	Lola B06/10	AER P32T 4.0 L Turbo V8	SEB	LBH	LAG	UTA	LIM	MOH	ELK	MOS	PET; 4				15th	30
2012	Dempsey Racing	P2	Lola B12/87	Judd-BMW HK 3.6 L V8	SEB	LBH	LAG	LIM	MOS	MOH	ELK; WD	BAL	VIR	PET			NC	0

=== Complete European Le Mans Series results ===
(key) (Races in bold indicate pole position; results in italics indicate fastest lap)

Year	Entrant	Class	Chassis	Engine	1	2	3	4	5	Rank	Points
2004	K2 Race Engineering	LMP2	Pilbeam MP91	Judd KV675 3.4L V8	MNZ	NUR	SIL; Ret	SPA		NC	0
2006	Team Bruichladdich Radical	LMP2	Radical SR9	AER P07 2.0L Turbo I4	IST	SPA	NUR	DON; Ret	JAR	NC	0

=== Complete 24 Hours of Le Mans results ===
Year	Team	Co-Drivers	Car	Class	Laps	Pos.	Class Pos.
2008	(United Kingdom) Team Bruichladdich Radical	(France) Marc Rostan (United States) Gunnar Jeannette	Radical SR9-AER	LMP2	297	31st	6th

=== Complete IMSA SportsCar Championship results ===
(key) (Races in bold indicate pole position; results in italics indicate fastest lap)

Year	Team	Class	Make	Engine	1	2	3	4	5	6	7	8	9	10	11	Pos.	Points
2014	SpeedSource	P	Mazda Prototype	Mazda 2.2 L SKYACTIV-D (SH-VPTS) I4 Turbo (diesel)	DAY	SEB; 11	LBH	LGA	DET	WGL; 13†	MOS	IND	ELK	COA	PET; 8	39th	46
2015	SpeedSource	P	Mazda Prototype	Mazda 2.2 L SKYACTIV-D (SH-VPTS) I4 Turbo (diesel)	DAY; 11	SEB; 11	LBH	LGA	DET	WGL; 5	MOS	ELK	COA	PET		15th	69
2016	Mazda Motorsports	P	Mazda Prototype	Mazda MZ-2.0T 2.0 L I4 Turbo	DAY; 13	SEB; 8	LBH	LAG	DET	WGL; 5	MOS	ELK	COA	PET		20th	70
2021	D3+ Transformers-Dawson Racing	LMP3	Ligier JS P320	Nissan VK56DE 5.6 L V8	DAY	SEB	MOH	WGL; 6	WGL	ELK	PET					28th	276
