= 2001 Grand American Road Racing Championship =

2nd season of the racing series organized by Grand-American

Seasons
- ← 2000 2002 →

The 2001 Grand American Road Racing Championship was the second season of the Grand American Road Racing Championship run by the Grand American Road Racing Association. The season involved five classes: Sports Racing Prototype I and II (SRP-I and SRP-II), Grand Touring Sport (GTS), Grand Touring (GT), and American GT (AGT). 10 races were run from February 3, 2001, to November 3, 2001, with Watkins Glen International gaining a date in August.

== Schedule ==
Some events featured two races of different length, with a break-up of the five competing classes.

Rnd	Race	Length	Class	Circuit	Location	Date
1	(United States) Rolex 24 at Daytona	24 Hours	All	Daytona International Speedway	Daytona, Florida	February 2 February 3
2	(United States) Nextel 250	250 Miles	All	Homestead-Miami Speedway	Homestead, Florida	March 3
3	(United States) Sun Automotive 200	200 Miles	All	Phoenix International Raceway	Avondale, Arizona	April 21
4	(United States) Six Hours of the Glen	6 Hours	All	Watkins Glen International	Watkins Glen, New York	May 20
5	(United States) Dodge Dealers Grand Prix	125 Miles	GTs	Lime Rock Park	Lakeville, Connecticut	May 26
5	(United States) Dodge Dealers Grand Prix	40+45 Minutes	SRPs	Lime Rock Park	Lakeville, Connecticut	May 28
6	(United States) U.S. Road Racing Classic	250 Miles	All	Mid-Ohio Sports Car Course	Lexington, Ohio	June 10
7	(United States) Road America 500	500 Miles	All	Road America	Elkhart Lake, Wisconsin	July 8
8	(Canada) Le Grand Prix de Trois-Rivières	200 km	GT, AGT, SGS	Circuit Trois-Rivières	Trois-Rivières, Quebec	August 4
8	(Canada) Le Grand Prix de Trois-Rivières	225 km	SRPs, GTS	Circuit Trois-Rivières	Trois-Rivières, Quebec	August 5
9	(United States) Bully Hill Vineyards 250	250 Miles	All	Watkins Glen International	Watkins Glen, New York	August 10
10	(United States) Grand-Am Finale	3 Hours	All	Daytona International Speedway	Daytona, Florida	November 3

Grand American Road Racing initially announced 9 races with a final tenth round to be added later. The finale would be a sprint race at Daytona International Speedway. the schedule consisted of the same tracks as the previous season with the only notable change being an additional sprint race at Watkins Glen.

== Entry list ==
=== SRP ===
Team	Chassis	Engine	Tyre	No.	Drivers	Rnds.
(United States) Jacobs Motorsports	Riley & Scott Mk III	Ford 6.0 L V8	G Y	06	(United States) Michael Jacobs	1–2
(United States) Jacobs Motorsports	Riley & Scott Mk III	Ford 6.0 L V8	G Y	06	(United States) Peter Argetsinger	1–2
(United States) Jacobs Motorsports	Riley & Scott Mk III	Ford 6.0 L V8	G Y	06	(United States) Todd Snyder	1
(United States) Jacobs Motorsports	Riley & Scott Mk III	Ford 6.0 L V8	G Y	06	(United States) Nick Longhi	1
(United States) Jacobs Motorsports	Riley & Scott Mk III	Ford 6.0 L V8	G Y	06	(United States) Allan Ziegelman	2
(United States) Jacobs Motorsports	Lola B98/10	Ford 6.0 L V8	Y	45	(United States) Michael Jacobs	1
(United States) Jacobs Motorsports	Lola B98/10	Ford 6.0 L V8	Y	45	(United States) Frank Del Vecchio	1
(United States) Jacobs Motorsports	Lola B98/10	Ford 6.0 L V8	Y	45	(United States) Trevor Hilliar	1
(United States) Jacobs Motorsports	Lola B98/10	Ford 6.0 L V8	Y	45	(United States) Ron Morcek	1
(United States) Jacobs Motorsports	Lola B98/10	Ford 6.0 L V8	Y	45	(United States) Jim Webb	1
(United States) Jacobs Motorsports	Lola B98/10	Ford 6.0 L V8	Y	45	(United States) William Langhorne	1
(United States) Philip Creighton Motorsports	Lola B2K/10	Ford 6.0 L V8	G	4	(United States) Duncan Dayton	1
(United States) Philip Creighton Motorsports	Lola B2K/10	Ford 6.0 L V8	G	4	(United Kingdom) John Burton	1
(United States) Philip Creighton Motorsports	Lola B2K/10	Ford 6.0 L V8	G	4	(United States) Rick Sutherland	1
(United States) Philip Creighton Motorsports	Lola B2K/10	Ford 6.0 L V8	G	4	(United States) Scott Schubot	1
(United States) Miracle Motorsports	Riley & Scott Mk III	Ford 6.0 L V8	G	6	(United States) Brent Sherman	3–4, 7–9
(United States) Miracle Motorsports	Riley & Scott Mk III	Ford 6.0 L V8	G	6	(Canada) Ross Bentley	3–4, 7
(United States) Miracle Motorsports	Riley & Scott Mk III	Ford 6.0 L V8	G	6	(United States) John Macaluso	4, 7–9
(Germany) Konrad Motorsport	Lola B2K/10	Ford 6.0 L V8	G	8	(Austria) Franz Konrad	1–2
(Germany) Konrad Motorsport	Lola B2K/10	Ford 6.0 L V8	G	8	(Australia) Alan Heath	1
(Germany) Konrad Motorsport	Lola B2K/10	Ford 6.0 L V8	G	8	(United States) Charles Slater	1
(Germany) Konrad Motorsport	Lola B2K/10	Ford 6.0 L V8	G	8	(Brazil) Gualter Salles	1
(Germany) Konrad Motorsport	Lola B2K/10	Ford 6.0 L V8	G	8	(United States) John Paul, Jr.	2
(United States) Risi Competizione	Ferrari 333 SP	Ferrari F310E 4.0 L V12	G	12	(Germany) Ralf Kelleners	1
(United States) Risi Competizione	Ferrari 333 SP	Ferrari F310E 4.0 L V12	G	12	(Australia) David Brabham	1
(United States) Risi Competizione	Ferrari 333 SP	Ferrari F310E 4.0 L V12	G	12	(United Kingdom) Allan McNish	1
(United States) Risi Competizione	Ferrari 333 SP	Ferrari F310E 4.0 L V12	G	12	(Belgium) Eric van de Poele	1
(United States) Dyson Racing Team	Riley & Scott Mk III	Ford 6.0 L V8	G	16	(United Kingdom) James Weaver	All
(United States) Dyson Racing Team	Riley & Scott Mk III	Ford 6.0 L V8	G	16	(United States) Butch Leitzinger	All
(United States) Dyson Racing Team	Riley & Scott Mk III	Ford 6.0 L V8	G	16	(United Kingdom) Andy Wallace	1
(United States) Dyson Racing Team	Riley & Scott Mk III	Ford 6.0 L V8	G	20	(United States) Elliott Forbes-Robinson	1, 4–10
(United States) Dyson Racing Team	Riley & Scott Mk III	Ford 6.0 L V8	G	20	(United States) Rob Dyson	1, 4, 9–10
(United States) Dyson Racing Team	Riley & Scott Mk III	Ford 6.0 L V8	G	20	(Italy) Max Papis	1
(United States) Dyson Racing Team	Riley & Scott Mk III	Ford 6.0 L V8	G	20	(Sweden) Niclas Jönsson	1
(United States) Dyson Racing Team	Riley & Scott Mk III	Ford 6.0 L V8	G	20	(United Kingdom) Andy Wallace	4–5
(United States) Dyson Racing Team	Riley & Scott Mk III	Ford 6.0 L V8	G	20	(United States) Dorsey Schroeder	6–8
(United States) Dyson Racing Team	Riley & Scott Mk III	Ford 6.0 L V8	G	20	(United States) Chris Dyson	9–10
(South Africa) Earl Goddard	GMS Durango LMP1	Judd 4.0 L V10	?	24	(South Africa) Earl Goddard	1*
(South Africa) Earl Goddard	GMS Durango LMP1	Judd 4.0 L V10	?	24	(France) Soheil Ayari	1*
(United States) Lista Doran Racing	Crawford SSC2K (1-3) Ferrari 333 SP (4-9) Dallara SP1 (10)	Judd GV4 4.0 L V10	Y	27	(Belgium) Didier Theys	All
(United States) Lista Doran Racing	Crawford SSC2K (1-3) Ferrari 333 SP (4-9) Dallara SP1 (10)	Judd GV4 4.0 L V10	Y	27	(Italy) Mauro Baldi	1–2, 4–7, 9–10
(United States) Lista Doran Racing	Crawford SSC2K (1-3) Ferrari 333 SP (4-9) Dallara SP1 (10)	Judd GV4 4.0 L V10	Y	27	(Switzerland) Fredy Lienhard	1, 3–4, 7
(United States) Lista Doran Racing	Crawford SSC2K (1-3) Ferrari 333 SP (4-9) Dallara SP1 (10)	Judd GV4 4.0 L V10	Y	27	(Canada) Ross Bentley	1, 8
(United States) Intersport Racing	Riley & Scott Mk III	Ford 5.1 L V8	G	28	(United States) Spencer Trenery	1
(United States) Intersport Racing	Riley & Scott Mk III	Ford 5.1 L V8	G	28	(United States) Frank Emmett	1
(United States) Intersport Racing	Riley & Scott Mk III	Ford 5.1 L V8	G	28	(United States) Bruce Trenery	1
(United States) Intersport Racing	Riley & Scott Mk III	Ford 5.1 L V8	G	28	(Belgium) Patrick van Schoote	1
(United States) Intersport Racing	Riley & Scott Mk III	Ford 5.1 L V8	G	28	(United States) Clint Field	2–3, 5–6
(United States) Intersport Racing	Riley & Scott Mk III	Ford 5.1 L V8	G	28	(United States) Joel Field	2–3, 6
(United States) Intersport Racing	Riley & Scott Mk III	Ford 5.1 L V8	G	28	(United States) John Mirro	5
(United States) Intersport Racing	Lola B2K/10	Judd GV4 4.0 L V10	G	37	(United States) Jon Field	All
(United States) Intersport Racing	Lola B2K/10	Judd GV4 4.0 L V10	G	37	(United States) Joel Field	1, 5
(United States) Intersport Racing	Lola B2K/10	Judd GV4 4.0 L V10	G	37	(United States) Clint Field	1, 7, 10
(United States) Intersport Racing	Lola B2K/10	Judd GV4 4.0 L V10	G	37	(Sweden) Carl Rosenblad	1
(United States) Intersport Racing	Lola B2K/10	Judd GV4 4.0 L V10	G	37	(United Kingdom) Oliver Gavin	2–4, 6–9
(United States) Blackforest Motorsports Group	Riley & Scott Mk III	Ford 5.1 L V8	G	28	(United States) Peter Argetsinger	10
(United States) Blackforest Motorsports Group	Riley & Scott Mk III	Ford 5.1 L V8	G	28	(United Kingdom) Ian James	10
(United States) Champion Racing	Lola B2K/10	Porsche 3.6 L Turbo Flat-6	G	38	(United States) Hurley Haywood	1, 10
(United States) Champion Racing	Lola B2K/10	Porsche 3.6 L Turbo Flat-6	G	38	(United States) Dorsey Schroeder	1
(United States) Champion Racing	Lola B2K/10	Porsche 3.6 L Turbo Flat-6	G	38	(France) Bob Wollek	1
(United States) Champion Racing	Lola B2K/10	Porsche 3.6 L Turbo Flat-6	G	38	(Germany) Sascha Maassen	1
(United States) Champion Racing	Lola B2K/10	Porsche 3.6 L Turbo Flat-6	G	38	(United Kingdom) Andy Wallace	10
(Italy) BMS Scuderia Italia	Ferrari 333 SP	Ferrari F310E 4.0 L V12	G	45	(Austria) Philipp Peter	1*
(Italy) BMS Scuderia Italia	Ferrari 333 SP	Ferrari F310E 4.0 L V12	G	45	(Italy) Marco Zadra	1*
(United States) Downing Atlanta	Kudzu DLY	Mazda 4-Rotor	G	63	(United States) Jim Downing	1, 7
(United States) Downing Atlanta	Kudzu DLY	Mazda 4-Rotor	G	63	(United States) Howard Katz	1
(United States) Downing Atlanta	Kudzu DLY	Mazda 4-Rotor	G	63	(United States) Chris Ronson	1
(United States) Downing Atlanta	Kudzu DLY	Mazda 4-Rotor	G	63	(United States) A.J. Smith	1
(United States) Downing Atlanta	Kudzu DLY	Mazda 4-Rotor	G	63	(United States) Jim Pace	7
(United States) Downing Atlanta	Kudzu DLY	Mazda 4-Rotor	G	63	(United States) Barry Waddell	7
(United States) Robinson Racing	Riley & Scott Mk III (1-9) Riley & Scott Mk III C (10)	Judd GV4 4.0 L V10	G	74	(United States) Jack Baldwin	All
(United States) Robinson Racing	Riley & Scott Mk III (1-9) Riley & Scott Mk III C (10)	Judd GV4 4.0 L V10	G	74	(United States) George Robinson	1–9
(United States) Robinson Racing	Riley & Scott Mk III (1-9) Riley & Scott Mk III C (10)	Judd GV4 4.0 L V10	G	74	(United States) Irv Hoerr	1
(United States) Robinson Racing	Riley & Scott Mk III (1-9) Riley & Scott Mk III C (10)	Judd GV4 4.0 L V10	G	74	(United States) Buddy Lazier	1
(United States) Robinson Racing	Riley & Scott Mk III (1-9) Riley & Scott Mk III C (10)	Judd GV4 4.0 L V10	G	74	(United States) Johnny O'Connell	4
(United States) Robinson Racing	Riley & Scott Mk III (1-9) Riley & Scott Mk III C (10)	Judd GV4 4.0 L V10	G	74	(Belgium) Eric van de Poele	7
(United States) Robinson Racing	Riley & Scott Mk III (1-9) Riley & Scott Mk III C (10)	Judd GV4 4.0 L V10	G	74	(United States) Steve Knapp	10
(United States) Sezio Florida Racing Team	Norma M2000-01	Mader (BMW) 4.0 L V8	G	78	(France) Patrice Roussel	1–8, 10
(United States) Sezio Florida Racing Team	Norma M2000-01	Mader (BMW) 4.0 L V8	G	78	(France) Edouard Sezionale	1–8, 10
(United States) Sezio Florida Racing Team	Norma M2000-01	Mader (BMW) 4.0 L V8	G	78	(United States) John Macaluso	1
(United States) Sezio Florida Racing Team	Norma M2000-01	Mader (BMW) 4.0 L V8	G	78	(France) Georges Forgeois	1
(United States) Sezio Florida Racing Team	Norma M2000-01	Mader (BMW) 4.0 L V8	G	78	(United States) John Mirro	4
(United States) Sezio Florida Racing Team	Norma M2000-01	Mader (BMW) 4.0 L V8	G	78	(United States) Rick Fairbanks	7
(United States) Bob Akin Motorsports	Riley & Scott Mk III	Ford 6.0 L V8	Y	83	(Germany) Norman Simon	1
(United States) Bob Akin Motorsports	Riley & Scott Mk III	Ford 6.0 L V8	Y	83	(United States) Mark Simo	1
(United States) Bob Akin Motorsports	Riley & Scott Mk III	Ford 6.0 L V8	Y	83	(United States) Brian DeVries	1
(United States) Bob Akin Motorsports	Riley & Scott Mk III	Ford 6.0 L V8	Y	83	(Germany) Michael Lauer	1
(United States) TRV Motorsport	Riley & Scott Mk III	Chevrolet 5.0 L V8	G	95	(United States) Tom Volk	1–2, 6, 10
(United States) TRV Motorsport	Riley & Scott Mk III	Chevrolet 5.0 L V8	G	95	(United States) Jeret Schroeder	1–2, 10
(United States) TRV Motorsport	Riley & Scott Mk III	Chevrolet 5.0 L V8	G	95	(United States) John Mirro	1
(United States) TRV Motorsport	Riley & Scott Mk III	Chevrolet 5.0 L V8	G	95	(United States) Barry Waddell	1
(United States) TRV Motorsport	Riley & Scott Mk III	Chevrolet 5.0 L V8	G	95	(Canada) Ross Bentley	6

=== SRPII ===
Team	Chassis	Engine	Tyre	No.	Drivers	Rnds.
(United States) TRP Racing	Lola B2K/40	Nissan 3.0 L V6	G	6	(United States) Jeff Bucknum	1
(United States) TRP Racing	Lola B2K/40	Nissan 3.0 L V6	G	6	(United States) Brent Sherman	1
(United States) TRP Racing	Lola B2K/40	Nissan 3.0 L V6	G	6	(United States) Travis Duder	1
(United States) TRP Racing	Lola B2K/40	Nissan 3.0 L V6	G	6	(United States) Gary Tiller	1
(United States) Rand Racing LLC	Lola B2K/40	Nissan 3.0 L V6	G	8	(United States) Anthony Lazzaro	10
(United States) Rand Racing LLC	Lola B2K/40	Nissan 3.0 L V6	G	8	(United States) Terry Borcheller	10*
(United States) Archangel Motorsport Services	Lola B2K/40	Nissan 3.0 L V6	A	21	(United States) Andy Lally	1–6, 10
(United States) Archangel Motorsport Services	Lola B2K/40	Nissan 3.0 L V6	A	21	(Canada) Paul Macey	1–6
(United States) Archangel Motorsport Services	Lola B2K/40	Nissan 3.0 L V6	A	21	(United Kingdom) Martin Henderson	1
(United States) Archangel Motorsport Services	Lola B2K/40	Nissan 3.0 L V6	A	21	(United Kingdom) Peter Seldon	1
(United States) Archangel Motorsport Services	Lola B2K/40	Nissan 3.0 L V6	A	21	(United States) Larry Oberto	4, 7
(United States) Archangel Motorsport Services	Lola B2K/40	Nissan 3.0 L V6	A	21	(United Kingdom) Ben Devlin	7–10
(United States) Archangel Motorsport Services	Lola B2K/40	Nissan 3.0 L V6	A	21	(United States) David Sterenberg	7, 9
(United States) Archangel Motorsport Services	Lola B2K/40	Nissan 3.0 L V6	A	21	(Canada) Jean-Francois Veilleux	8
(United States) Archangel Motorsport Services	Lola B2K/40	Nissan 3.0 L V6	A	22	(United States) Mike Durand	1–8, 9
(United States) Archangel Motorsport Services	Lola B2K/40	Nissan 3.0 L V6	A	22	(United States) Jeff Clinton	1, 3, 6
(United States) Archangel Motorsport Services	Lola B2K/40	Nissan 3.0 L V6	A	22	(United States) Andrew Davis	1
(United States) Archangel Motorsport Services	Lola B2K/40	Nissan 3.0 L V6	A	22	(United States) Tony Dudek	1
(United States) Archangel Motorsport Services	Lola B2K/40	Nissan 3.0 L V6	A	22	(United Kingdom) Nigel Greensall	2
(United States) Archangel Motorsport Services	Lola B2K/40	Nissan 3.0 L V6	A	22	(France) Georges Forgeois	4
(United States) Archangel Motorsport Services	Lola B2K/40	Nissan 3.0 L V6	A	22	(United States) Larry Connor	4
(United States) Archangel Motorsport Services	Lola B2K/40	Nissan 3.0 L V6	A	22	(United States) Howard Katz	5, 7
(United States) Archangel Motorsport Services	Lola B2K/40	Nissan 3.0 L V6	A	22	(United States) Andy Lally	7–9
(United States) Archangel Motorsport Services	Lola B2K/40	Nissan 3.0 L V6	A	22	(United States) Jeff Tillman	9
(United States) Archangel Motorsport Services	Lola B2K/40	Nissan 3.0 L V6	A	22	(United States) Joseph Safina	10
(Canada) Multimatic Motorsports	Lola B2K/40	Nissan 3.0 L V6	D	25	(Canada) Scott Maxwell	6–9
(Canada) Multimatic Motorsports	Lola B2K/40	Nissan 3.0 L V6	D	25	(Canada) Peter Czapka	6–9
(United States) Northstar Racing	Lola B2K/40	Nissan 3.0 L V6	A	26	(United States) Cass Whitehead	1
(United States) Northstar Racing	Lola B2K/40	Nissan 3.0 L V6	A	26	(United States) B. J. Zacharias	1
(United States) Northstar Racing	Lola B2K/40	Nissan 3.0 L V6	A	26	(United States) Jeff Giangrande	1
(United States) Northstar Racing	Lola B2K/40	Nissan 3.0 L V6	A	26	(United Kingdom) Chris Hall	1
(United States) Team Bucknum Racing	Pilbeam MP84	Nissan 3.0 L V6	A	31	(United States) Chris McMurry	10
(United States) Team Bucknum Racing	Pilbeam MP84	Nissan 3.0 L V6	A	31	(United States) Jerry Gillis	10
(United States) Team Bucknum Racing	Pilbeam MP84	Nissan 3.0 L V6	A	31	(United States) Gary Tiller	10
(United States) Pilbeam Racing America	Pilbeam MP84	Nissan 3.0 L V6	A	48	(United States) Shane Lewis	1
(United States) Pilbeam Racing America	Pilbeam MP84	Nissan 3.0 L V6	A	48	(Belgium) Bruno Lambert	1
(United States) Pilbeam Racing America	Pilbeam MP84	Nissan 3.0 L V6	A	48	(Switzerland) Toni Seiler	1
(United States) Pilbeam Racing America	Pilbeam MP84	Nissan 3.0 L V6	A	48	(United States) Jeff Bucknum	7
(United States) Pilbeam Racing America	Pilbeam MP84	Nissan 3.0 L V6	A	48	(United States) Joe Blacker	7
(United States) Pilbeam Racing America	Pilbeam MP84	Nissan 3.0 L V6	A	48	(United States) Dave Dullum	7
(United States) Pilbeam Racing America	Pilbeam MP84	Nissan 3.0 L V6	A	49	(United States) Phil Harris	1*
(United States) Pilbeam Racing America	Pilbeam MP84	Nissan 3.0 L V6	A	49	(United States) Cindi Lux	1*
(United States) Pilbeam Racing America	Pilbeam MP84	Nissan 3.0 L V6	A	49	(United States) Peter Argetsinger	1*
(United Kingdom) Redman Bright	Pilbeam MP84	Nissan 3.0 L V6	A	60	(United Kingdom) Peter Owen	1*
(United Kingdom) Redman Bright	Pilbeam MP84	Nissan 3.0 L V6	A	60	(United Kingdom) Mark Smithson	1*
(United States) Team Spencer Motorsports	Kudzu DLM	Mazda 2.0 L 3-Rotor (1) Mazda 2.0 L 2-Rotor (2, 4, 10)	G	62	(United States) Rich Grupp	1–2, 4, 10
(United States) Team Spencer Motorsports	Kudzu DLM	Mazda 2.0 L 3-Rotor (1) Mazda 2.0 L 2-Rotor (2, 4, 10)	G	62	(United States) Dennis Spencer	1–2, 10
(United States) Team Spencer Motorsports	Kudzu DLM	Mazda 2.0 L 3-Rotor (1) Mazda 2.0 L 2-Rotor (2, 4, 10)	G	62	(United States) Ryan Hampton	1, 4, 10
(United States) Team Spencer Motorsports	Kudzu DLM	Mazda 2.0 L 3-Rotor (1) Mazda 2.0 L 2-Rotor (2, 4, 10)	G	62	(United States) Barry Waddell	4
Sportscar Racing Team Sweden	Lola B2K/40	Nissan 3.0 L V6	A	79	(Sweden) Thed Björk	1
Sportscar Racing Team Sweden	Lola B2K/40	Nissan 3.0 L V6	A	79	(Sweden) Niklas Loven	1
Sportscar Racing Team Sweden	Lola B2K/40	Nissan 3.0 L V6	A	79	(United States) Larry Oberto	1
Sportscar Racing Team Sweden	Lola B2K/40	Nissan 3.0 L V6	A	79	(Sweden) Stanley Dickens	1
(Canada) PorscheHaus Racing	Lola B2K/40	Nissan 3.0 L V6	G	88	(Canada) Stephane Veilleux	2, 4–5, 8
(Canada) PorscheHaus Racing	Lola B2K/40	Nissan 3.0 L V6	G	88	(Canada) Peter Overing	2, 4–5
(Canada) PorscheHaus Racing	Lola B2K/40	Nissan 3.0 L V6	G	88	(Canada) Jean-François Dumoulin	4, 8
(Canada) PorscheHaus Racing	Lola B2K/40	Nissan 3.0 L V6	G	89	(Canada) Greg Pootmans	1–9
(Canada) PorscheHaus Racing	Lola B2K/40	Nissan 3.0 L V6	G	89	(Canada) Bruno St. Jacques	1–9
(Canada) PorscheHaus Racing	Lola B2K/40	Nissan 3.0 L V6	G	89	(Canada) Robert Julian	1, 4
(Canada) PorscheHaus Racing	Lola B2K/40	Nissan 3.0 L V6	G	89	(United States) Bob Woodman	1, 7
(United States) Snow/Schumacher Racing	Lola B2K/40	Nissan 3.0 L V6	A	99	(United States) Martin Snow	1*
(United States) Snow/Schumacher Racing	Lola B2K/40	Nissan 3.0 L V6	A	99	(United States) Larry Schumacher	1*
(United States) Snow/Schumacher Racing	Lola B2K/40	Nissan 3.0 L V6	A	99	(United States) Stu Hayner	1*

=== GTS ===
Team	Chassis	Engine	Tyre	No.	Drivers	Rnds.
(Canada) Bytzek Motorsport	Porsche 911 GT1 Evo	Porsche 3.6 L Turbo Flat-6	D	0	(Canada) Scott Maxwell	1
(Canada) Bytzek Motorsport	Porsche 911 GT1 Evo	Porsche 3.6 L Turbo Flat-6	D	0	(Canada) David Empringham	1
(Canada) Bytzek Motorsport	Porsche 911 GT1 Evo	Porsche 3.6 L Turbo Flat-6	D	0	(Canada) Richard Spenard	1
(Canada) Bytzek Motorsport	Porsche 911 GT1 Evo	Porsche 3.6 L Turbo Flat-6	D	0	(Canada) Klaus Bytzek	1
(Canada) Bytzek Motorsport	Porsche 911 GT1 Evo	Porsche 3.6 L Turbo Flat-6	D	01	(United States) Larry Schumacher	1
(Canada) Bytzek Motorsport	Porsche 911 GT1 Evo	Porsche 3.6 L Turbo Flat-6	D	01	(Canada) Harry Bytzek	1
(Canada) Bytzek Motorsport	Porsche 911 GT1 Evo	Porsche 3.6 L Turbo Flat-6	D	01	(Canada) John Brenner	1
(Canada) Bytzek Motorsport	Porsche 911 GT1 Evo	Porsche 3.6 L Turbo Flat-6	D	01	(Canada) James Holtom	1
(Switzerland) Haberthur Racing	Porsche 993 GT2 R	Porsche 3.6 L Turbo Flat-6	D	03	(Italy) Mauro Casadei	1
(Switzerland) Haberthur Racing	Porsche 993 GT2 R	Porsche 3.6 L Turbo Flat-6	D	03	(Italy) Stefano Bucci	1
(Switzerland) Haberthur Racing	Porsche 993 GT2 R	Porsche 3.6 L Turbo Flat-6	D	03	(Italy) Andrea Garbagnati	1
(Switzerland) Haberthur Racing	Porsche 993 GT2 R	Porsche 3.6 L Turbo Flat-6	D	03	(Switzerland) Manuel Nicolaidis	1
(United States) G & W Motorsports	Porsche 993 GT2	Porsche 3.6 L Turbo Flat-6	D	07	(United States) Steve Marshall	All
(United States) G & W Motorsports	Porsche 993 GT2	Porsche 3.6 L Turbo Flat-6	D	07	(United States) Danny Marshall	1–2
(United States) G & W Motorsports	Porsche 993 GT2	Porsche 3.6 L Turbo Flat-6	D	07	(United States) Johannes van Overbeek	1
(United States) G & W Motorsports	Porsche 993 GT2	Porsche 3.6 L Turbo Flat-6	D	07	(United States) Tim Holt	1
(United States) G & W Motorsports	Porsche 993 GT2	Porsche 3.6 L Turbo Flat-6	D	07	(United States) Michael Schrom	3
(United States) G & W Motorsports	Porsche 993 GT2	Porsche 3.6 L Turbo Flat-6	D	07	(United States) Cort Wagner	4–7, 9–10
(United States) G & W Motorsports	Porsche 993 GT2	Porsche 3.6 L Turbo Flat-6	D	07	(United States) Darren Law	8
(United States) Corvette Racing	Chevrolet Corvette C5-R	Chevrolet 7.0 L V8	G	2	(United States) Johnny O'Connell	1
(United States) Corvette Racing	Chevrolet Corvette C5-R	Chevrolet 7.0 L V8	G	2	(Canada) Ron Fellows	1
(United States) Corvette Racing	Chevrolet Corvette C5-R	Chevrolet 7.0 L V8	G	2	(United States) Chris Kneifel	1
(United States) Corvette Racing	Chevrolet Corvette C5-R	Chevrolet 7.0 L V8	G	2	(France) Franck Fréon	1
(United States) Corvette Racing	Chevrolet Corvette C5-R	Chevrolet 7.0 L V8	G	3	(United States) Dale Earnhardt	1
(United States) Corvette Racing	Chevrolet Corvette C5-R	Chevrolet 7.0 L V8	G	3	(United States) Andy Pilgrim	1
(United States) Corvette Racing	Chevrolet Corvette C5-R	Chevrolet 7.0 L V8	G	3	(United States) Kelly Collins	1
(United States) Corvette Racing	Chevrolet Corvette C5-R	Chevrolet 7.0 L V8	G	3	(United States) Dale Earnhardt Jr.	1
(United States) Rocketsports Racing	Saleen S7-R	Ford 6.9 L V8	G	5	(United States) Paul Gentilozzi	1
(United States) Rocketsports Racing	Saleen S7-R	Ford 6.9 L V8	G	5	(United States) Scott Pruett	1
(United States) Rocketsports Racing	Saleen S7-R	Ford 6.9 L V8	G	5	(United States) John Miller	1
(United States) Rocketsports Racing	Saleen S7-R	Ford 6.9 L V8	G	5	(United States) Anthony Lazzaro	1
(United States) Fordahl Motorsports	Saleen S7-R	Ford 6.9 L V8	Y	5	(United States) Chris Bingham	2–10
(United States) Fordahl Motorsports	Saleen S7-R	Ford 6.9 L V8	Y	5	(United States) Ron Johnson	2–10
(United States) Free Spirit Motorsports	Porsche 993 GT2	Porsche 3.6 L Turbo Flat-6	D	13	(United States) David Kicak	1
(United States) Free Spirit Motorsports	Porsche 993 GT2	Porsche 3.6 L Turbo Flat-6	D	13	(United States) Andrey Kosovych	1
(United States) Free Spirit Motorsports	Porsche 993 GT2	Porsche 3.6 L Turbo Flat-6	D	13	(United States) Scott Burkland	1
(United States) Free Spirit Motorsports	Porsche 993 GT2	Porsche 3.6 L Turbo Flat-6	D	13	(United States) Arthur Pilla	1
(United Kingdom) Chamberlain Motorsports	Dodge Viper GTS-R	Dodge 8.0 L V10	D	15	(United Kingdom) Christian Vann	1
(United Kingdom) Chamberlain Motorsports	Dodge Viper GTS-R	Dodge 8.0 L V10	D	15	(United States) Chris Bingham	1
(United Kingdom) Chamberlain Motorsports	Dodge Viper GTS-R	Dodge 8.0 L V10	D	15	(Japan) Seiji Ara	1
(United Kingdom) Chamberlain Motorsports	Dodge Viper GTS-R	Dodge 8.0 L V10	D	15	(United Kingdom) Robert Nearn	1
(United Kingdom) Chamberlain Motorsports	Dodge Viper GTS-R	Dodge 8.0 L V10	D	114	(Italy) Stefano Zonca	1
(United Kingdom) Chamberlain Motorsports	Dodge Viper GTS-R	Dodge 8.0 L V10	D	114	(Italy) Raffaele Sangiuolo	1
(United Kingdom) Chamberlain Motorsports	Dodge Viper GTS-R	Dodge 8.0 L V10	D	114	(Venezuela) Milka Duno	1
(United Kingdom) Chamberlain Motorsports	Dodge Viper GTS-R	Dodge 8.0 L V10	D	114	(United Kingdom) David Gooding	1
(United States) Tempur Racing	Chevrolet Camaro	Chevrolet 6.3 L V8	H	19	(United States) Frank Del Vecchio	5
(United States) Tempur Racing	Chevrolet Camaro	Chevrolet 6.3 L V8	H	19	(United States) Chris Thompson	5
(Netherlands) Marcos Racing International	Marcos Mantara LM600	Chevrolet 6.9 L V8	D	24	(Netherlands) Cor Euser	1
(Netherlands) Marcos Racing International	Marcos Mantara LM600	Chevrolet 6.9 L V8	D	24	(United Kingdom) Calum Lockie	1
(Netherlands) Marcos Racing International	Marcos Mantara LM600	Chevrolet 6.9 L V8	D	24	(Netherlands) Herman Buurman	1
(Netherlands) Marcos Racing International	Marcos Mantara LM600	Chevrolet 6.9 L V8	D	25	(Spain) Miguel Ángel de Castro	1
(Netherlands) Marcos Racing International	Marcos Mantara LM600	Chevrolet 6.9 L V8	D	25	(Netherlands) Peter van der Kolk	1
(Netherlands) Marcos Racing International	Marcos Mantara LM600	Chevrolet 6.9 L V8	D	25	(El Salvador) Toto Lassally	1
(Italy) Mastercar	Ferrari F355	Ferrari F129B 3.9 L V8	K	30	(Italy) Fabian Peroni	1
(Italy) Mastercar	Ferrari F355	Ferrari F129B 3.9 L V8	K	30	(Sweden) Tony Ring	1
(Italy) Mastercar	Ferrari F355	Ferrari F129B 3.9 L V8	K	30	(Russia) Sergey Zlobin	1
(Italy) Mastercar	Ferrari F355	Ferrari F129B 3.9 L V8	K	30	(Italy) Andrea Montermini	1
(United States) American Viperacing	Dodge Viper GTS-R	Dodge 8.0 L V10	G	45	(United States) Tom Weickardt	6
(United States) American Viperacing	Dodge Viper GTS-R	Dodge 8.0 L V10	G	45	(United States) Gene Martindale	6
(United States) Muzzy Racing	Dodge Viper GTS-R	Dodge 8.0 L V10	G	56	(United States) Ritch Marziale	3, 6
(United States) Muzzy Racing	Dodge Viper GTS-R	Dodge 8.0 L V10	G	56	(United States) Erik Messley	3
(United States) Muzzy Racing	Dodge Viper GTS-R	Dodge 8.0 L V10	G	56	(United States) Jeff Altenburg	6
(Germany) Proton Competition	Porsche 993 GT2	Porsche 3.6 L Turbo Flat-6	Y	69	(Austria) Horst Felbermayr, Sr.	1
(Germany) Proton Competition	Porsche 993 GT2	Porsche 3.6 L Turbo Flat-6	Y	69	(Austria) Horst Felbermayr, Jr.	1
(Germany) Proton Competition	Porsche 993 GT2	Porsche 3.6 L Turbo Flat-6	Y	69	(Germany) Christian Ried	1
(Germany) Proton Competition	Porsche 993 GT2	Porsche 3.6 L Turbo Flat-6	Y	69	(Germany) Gerold Ried	1
(United States) Gunnar Racing	Porsche 996 GT3-R	Porsche 3.6 L Flat-6	D	75	(United States) Gunnar Jeannette	9
(United States) Gunnar Racing	Porsche 996 GT3-R	Porsche 3.6 L Flat-6	D	75	(Canada) Stephen Bartkiw	9
(United States) Gunnar Racing	Porsche 911 GT1 Evo	Porsche 3.6 L Turbo Flat-6	D	76	(United States) Gunnar Jeannette	1
(United States) Gunnar Racing	Porsche 911 GT1 Evo	Porsche 3.6 L Turbo Flat-6	D	76	(United States) Wayne Jackson	1
(United States) Gunnar Racing	Porsche 911 GT1 Evo	Porsche 3.6 L Turbo Flat-6	D	76	(United States) Paul Newman	1
(United States) Gunnar Racing	Porsche 911 GT1 Evo	Porsche 3.6 L Turbo Flat-6	D	76	(United States) Mike Brockman	1
(United States) MCR/K Davis Racing	Porsche 996 GT3 Cup	Porsche 3.6 L Flat-6	D	85	(United States) Keith Alexander	10
(United States) MCR/K Davis Racing	Porsche 996 GT3 Cup	Porsche 3.6 L Flat-6	D	85	(United States) Michael Collucci	10
(United Kingdom) Cirtek Motorsport	Porsche 993 GT2	Porsche 3.6 L Turbo Flat-6	D	91	(United Kingdom) David Warnock	1
(United Kingdom) Cirtek Motorsport	Porsche 993 GT2	Porsche 3.6 L Turbo Flat-6	D	91	(United States) Ugo Colombo	1
(United Kingdom) Cirtek Motorsport	Porsche 993 GT2	Porsche 3.6 L Turbo Flat-6	D	91	(Portugal) Bernardo Sá Nogueira	1
(United Kingdom) Cirtek Motorsport	Porsche 993 GT2	Porsche 3.6 L Turbo Flat-6	D	91	(Australia) Christian D'Agostin	1
(Canada) Xemis Corp	Porsche 993 Carrera 2 (Fabcar)	Porsche 3.6 L Turbo Flat-6	G	91	(Canada) Eric Boisvert	8
(Canada) Xemis Corp	Porsche 993 Carrera 2 (Fabcar)	Porsche 3.6 L Turbo Flat-6	G	91	(Canada) Hugo Guenette	8
(Canada) Xemis Corp	Porsche 993 Carrera 2 (Fabcar)	Porsche 3.6 L Turbo Flat-6	G	93	(Canada) Jacques Guenette	4, 8
(Canada) Xemis Corp	Porsche 993 Carrera 2 (Fabcar)	Porsche 3.6 L Turbo Flat-6	G	93	(Canada) Jacques Guenette, Jr.	8
(United States) Schumacher Racing	Porsche 911 GT1 Evo (2-6) Porsche 993 GT2 (10)	Porsche 3.6 L Turbo Flat-6 (2-6) Porsche 3.2 L Turbo Flat-6 (10)	G	99	(United States) Larry Schumacher	2–6, 10
(United States) Schumacher Racing	Porsche 911 GT1 Evo (2-6) Porsche 993 GT2 (10)	Porsche 3.6 L Turbo Flat-6 (2-6) Porsche 3.2 L Turbo Flat-6 (10)	G	99	(United Kingdom) Robert Nearn	2
(United States) Schumacher Racing	Porsche 911 GT1 Evo (2-6) Porsche 993 GT2 (10)	Porsche 3.6 L Turbo Flat-6 (2-6) Porsche 3.2 L Turbo Flat-6 (10)	G	99	(United States) Martin Snow	3–4, 6
(United States) Schumacher Racing	Porsche 911 GT1 Evo (2-6) Porsche 993 GT2 (10)	Porsche 3.6 L Turbo Flat-6 (2-6) Porsche 3.2 L Turbo Flat-6 (10)	G	99	(United States) Gunnar Jeannette	5
(United States) Schumacher Racing	Porsche 911 GT1 Evo (2-6) Porsche 993 GT2 (10)	Porsche 3.6 L Turbo Flat-6 (2-6) Porsche 3.2 L Turbo Flat-6 (10)	G	99	(Germany) Wolfgang Kaufmann	10

== Results ==
Overall winners in bold.

Rnd	Circuit	SRP Winning Teams	SRPII Winning Teams	GTS Winning Teams	GT Winning Teams	AGT Winning Teams
Rnd	Circuit	SRP Winning Drivers	SRPII Winning Drivers	GTS Winning Drivers	GT Winning Drivers	AGT Winning Drivers
1	Daytona	(United States) #63 Downing Atlanta	(United States) #21 Archangel Motorsport Services	(United States) **#2 Corvette Racing**	(United States) #31 White Lightning Racing	(United States) #11 Hamilton Safe Motorsports
1	Daytona	(United States) Howard Katz (United States) Chris Ronson (United States) A. J. Smith (United States) Jim Downing	(United States) Andy Lally (Canada) Paul Macey (United Kingdom) Martin Henderson (United Kingdom) Peter Seldon	(United States) **Johnny O'Connell** (Canada) **Ron Fellows** (United States) **Chris Kneifel** (France) **Franck Fréon**	(Germany) Christian Menzel (United States) Randy Pobst (United States) Mike Fitzgerald (Germany) Lucas Luhr	(United States) Ken Bupp (United States) Dick Greer (United States) Doug Mills (United States) Simon Gregg
2	Homestead	(United States) **#16 Dyson Racing Team**	(United States) #22 Archangel Motorsport Services	(United States) #5 Fordahl Motorsports	(United States) #54 JET Motorsports	(United States) #09 Team X1-R
2	Homestead	(United Kingdom) **James Weaver** (United States) **Butch Leitzinger**	(United States) Mike Durand (United Kingdom) Nigel Greensall	(United States) Chris Bingham (United States) Ron Johnson	(United States) Toney Jennings (United States) Terry Borcheller	(United States) Craig Conway (United States) Doug Goad
3	Phoenix	(United States) **#37 Intersport Racing**	(Canada) #89 PorscheHaus Racing	(United States) #56 Muzzy Racing	(United States) #15 Fordahl Motorsports	(United States) #09 Team X1-R
3	Phoenix	(United States) **Jon Field** (United Kingdom) **Oliver Gavin**	(Canada) Robert Julien (Canada) Bruno St. Jacques	(United States) Ritch Marziale (United States) Erik Messley	(United States) Randy Pobst (United States) Kimberly Hiskey	(United States) Craig Conway (United States) Doug Goad
4	Watkins Glen	(United States) **#27 Lista Doran Racing**	(United States) #62 Team Spencer Motorsports	(United States) #5 Fordahl Motorsports	(United States) #81 G&W Motorsports	(United States) #09 Team X1-R
4	Watkins Glen	(Belgium) **Didier Theys** (Italy) **Mauro Baldi** (Switzerland) **Fredy Lienhard Sr.**	(United States) Rich Grupp (United States) Ryan Hampton (United States) Barry Waddell	(United States) Chris Bingham (United States) Ron Johnson	(United States) Darren Law (United States) David Murry (United States) Matt Drendel	(United States) Craig Conway (United States) Doug Goad
5^{†}	Lime Rock	(United States) **#16 Dyson Racing Team**	(United States) #22 Archangel Motorsport Services	(United States) #99 Schumacher Racing	(United States) **#54 JET Motorsports**	(United States) #09 Team X1-R
5^{†}	Lime Rock	(United Kingdom) **James Weaver** (United States) **Butch Leitzinger**	(United States) Mike Durand (United States) Howard Katz	(United States) Larry Schumacher (United States) Gunnar Jeannette	(United States) **Toney Jennings** (United States) **Terry Borcheller**	(United States) Craig Conway (United States) Doug Goad
6	Mid-Ohio	(United States) **#37 Intersport Racing**	(United States) #21 Archangel Motorsport Services	(United States) #5 Fordahl Motorsports	(United States) #54 JET Motorsports	(United States) #09 Team X1-R
6	Mid-Ohio	(United States) **Jon Field** (United Kingdom) **Oliver Gavin**	(United States) Andy Lally (Canada) Paul Macey	(United States) Chris Bingham (United States) Ron Johnson	(United States) Toney Jennings (United States) Terry Borcheller	(United States) Craig Conway (United States) Doug Goad
7	Road America	(United States) **#27 Lista Doran Racing**	(United States) #21 Archangel Motorsport Services	(United States) #5 Fordahl Motorsports	(United States) #15 Fordahl Motorsports	(United States) #11 Hamilton Safe Motorsports
7	Road America	(Belgium) **Didier Theys** (Italy) **Mauro Baldi** (Switzerland) **Fredy Lienhard Sr.**	(United Kingdom) Ben Devlin (United States) Larry Oberto (United States) David Sterenberg	(United States) Chris Bingham (United States) Ron Johnson	(United States) Randy Pobst (United States) Kimberly Hiskey	(United States) Ken Bupp (United States) Jon Leavy
8^{†}	Trois-Rivières	(United States) **#16 Dyson Racing Team**	(Canada) #88 PorscheHaus Racing	(United States) #5 Fordahl Motorsports	(United States) **#34 Zip/Pumpelly Racing**	(United States) #09 Team X1-R
8^{†}	Trois-Rivières	(United Kingdom) **James Weaver** (United States) **Butch Leitzinger**	(Canada) Stephane Veilleux (Canada) Jean-Francois Dumoulin (Canada) Peter Overing	(United States) Chris Bingham (United States) Ron Johnson	(United States) **Spencer Pumpelly**	(United States) Craig Conway (United States) Doug Goad
9	Watkins Glen	(United States) **#16 Dyson Racing Team**	(United States) #21 Archangel Motorsport Services	(United States) #5 Fordahl Motorsports	(United States) #45 Orbit Racing	(United States) #84 Comer Racing
9	Watkins Glen	(United Kingdom) **James Weaver** (United States) **Butch Leitzinger**	(United Kingdom) Ben Devlin (United States) David Sterenberg	(United States) Chris Bingham (United States) Ron Johnson	(United States) Kyle Petty (United States) John Andretti	(United States) Jack Willes
10	Daytona	(United States) **#16 Dyson Racing Team**	(United States) #8 Rand Racing LLC	(United States) #5 Fordahl Motorsports	(United States) #15 Fordahl Motorsports	(United States) #09 Team X1-R
10	Daytona	(United Kingdom) **James Weaver** (United States) **Butch Leitzinger**	(United States) Terry Borcheller (United States) Anthony Lazzaro (United States) Bill Rand	(United States) Chris Bingham (United States) Ron Johnson	(United States) Randy Pobst (United States) Kimberly Hiskey	(United States) Craig Conway (United States) Doug Goad

† - Two separate individual races were held.
