= 2004 Monterey Sports Car Championships =

Track map of Mazda Raceway Laguna Seca

The 2004 Monterey Sports Car Championships was the final race for the 2004 American Le Mans Series season and held at Mazda Raceway Laguna Seca. It took place on October 16, 2004.

== Official results ==
Class winners in bold. Cars failing to complete 70% of winner's distance marked as Not Classified (NC).

Pos	Class	No	Team	Drivers	Chassis	Tyre	Laps
Pos	Class	No	Team	Drivers	Engine	Tyre	Laps
1	**LMP1**	**2**	**(United States) ADT Champion Racing**	**(United Kingdom) Johnny Herbert (Switzerland) Pierre Kaffer**	**Audi R8**	M	**169**
1	**LMP1**	**2**	**(United States) ADT Champion Racing**	**(United Kingdom) Johnny Herbert (Switzerland) Pierre Kaffer**	**Audi 3.6L Turbo V8**	M	**169**
2	LMP1	38	(United States) ADT Champion Racing	(Germany) Marco Werner (Finland) JJ Lehto	Audi R8	M	169
2	LMP1	38	(United States) ADT Champion Racing	(Germany) Marco Werner (Finland) JJ Lehto	Audi 3.6L Turbo V8	M	169
3	LMP1	16	(United States) Dyson Racing	(United States) Butch Leitzinger (United Kingdom) James Weaver	MG-Lola EX257	G	168
3	LMP1	16	(United States) Dyson Racing	(United States) Butch Leitzinger (United Kingdom) James Weaver	MG (AER) XP20 2.0L Turbo I4	G	168
4	**GTS**	**3**	**(United States) Corvette Racing**	**(Canada) Ron Fellows (United States) Johnny O'Connell**	**Chevrolet Corvette C5-R**	M	**160**
4	**GTS**	**3**	**(United States) Corvette Racing**	**(Canada) Ron Fellows (United States) Johnny O'Connell**	**Chevrolet LS7r 7.0L V8**	M	**160**
5	GTS	4	(United States) Corvette Racing	(United Kingdom) Oliver Gavin (Monaco) Olivier Beretta	Chevrolet Corvette C5-R	M	160
5	GTS	4	(United States) Corvette Racing	(United Kingdom) Oliver Gavin (Monaco) Olivier Beretta	Chevrolet LS7r 7.0L V8	M	160
6	GTS	63	(United States) ACEMCO Motorsports	(United States) Terry Borcheller (United Kingdom) Johnny Mowlem	Saleen S7-R	P	157
6	GTS	63	(United States) ACEMCO Motorsports	(United States) Terry Borcheller (United Kingdom) Johnny Mowlem	Ford 7.0L V8	P	157
7	**LMP2**	**30**	**(United States) Intersport Racing**	**(United States) Clint Field (United States) Rick Sutherland (United Kingdom) Robin Liddell**	**Lola B2K/40**	P	**157**
7	**LMP2**	**30**	**(United States) Intersport Racing**	**(United States) Clint Field (United States) Rick Sutherland (United Kingdom) Robin Liddell**	**Judd KV675 3.4L V8**	P	**157**
8	**GT**	**24**	**(United States) Alex Job Racing**	**(Germany) Marc Lieb (France) Romain Dumas**	**Porsche 911 GT3-RSR**	M	**154**
8	**GT**	**24**	**(United States) Alex Job Racing**	**(Germany) Marc Lieb (France) Romain Dumas**	**Porsche 3.6L Flat-6**	M	**154**
9	GT	23	(United States) Alex Job Racing	(Germany) Jörg Bergmeister (Germany) Timo Bernhard	Porsche 911 GT3-RSR	M	154
9	GT	23	(United States) Alex Job Racing	(Germany) Jörg Bergmeister (Germany) Timo Bernhard	Porsche 3.6L Flat-6	M	154
10	GT	45	(United States) Flying Lizard Motorsports	(United States) Johannes van Overbeek (United States) Darren Law	Porsche 911 GT3-RSR	M	153
10	GT	45	(United States) Flying Lizard Motorsports	(United States) Johannes van Overbeek (United States) Darren Law	Porsche 3.6L Flat-6	M	153
11	GT	35	(United States) Risi Competizione	(United States) Anthony Lazzaro (Germany) Ralf Kelleners (Italy) Fabrizio de Simone	Ferrari 360 Modena GTC	P	152
11	GT	35	(United States) Risi Competizione	(United States) Anthony Lazzaro (Germany) Ralf Kelleners (Italy) Fabrizio de Simone	Ferrari 3.6L V8	P	152
12	GT	66	(United States) New Century - The Racer's Group	(United States) Patrick Long (United States) Cort Wagner	Porsche 911 GT3-RSR	M	152
12	GT	66	(United States) New Century - The Racer's Group	(United States) Patrick Long (United States) Cort Wagner	Porsche 3.6L Flat-6	M	152
13	GT	31	(United States) White Lightning Racing	(United States) Craig Stanton (United States) David Murry	Porsche 911 GT3-RSR	M	151
13	GT	31	(United States) White Lightning Racing	(United States) Craig Stanton (United States) David Murry	Porsche 3.6L Flat-6	M	151
14	GT	50	(United States) Panoz Motor Sports	(United States) Gunnar Jeannette (United Kingdom) Marino Franchitti	Panoz Esperante GT-LM	P	151
14	GT	50	(United States) Panoz Motor Sports	(United States) Gunnar Jeannette (United Kingdom) Marino Franchitti	Ford (Élan) 5.0L V8	P	151
15	GT	43	(United States) BAM!	(United States) Leo Hindery (Germany) Lucas Luhr (Germany) Sascha Maassen	Porsche 911 GT3-RSR	M	151
15	GT	43	(United States) BAM!	(United States) Leo Hindery (Germany) Lucas Luhr (Germany) Sascha Maassen	Porsche 3.6L Flat-6	M	151
16	GT	79	(United States) J-3 Racing	(United States) Justin Jackson (United Kingdom) Tim Sugden	Porsche 911 GT3-RSR	M	150
16	GT	79	(United States) J-3 Racing	(United States) Justin Jackson (United Kingdom) Tim Sugden	Porsche 3.6L Flat-6	M	150
17	GT	44	(United States) Flying Lizard Motorsports	(United States) Lonnie Pechnik (United States) Seth Neiman (United States) Jon Fogarty	Porsche 911 GT3-RSR	M	150
17	GT	44	(United States) Flying Lizard Motorsports	(United States) Lonnie Pechnik (United States) Seth Neiman (United States) Jon Fogarty	Porsche 3.6L Flat-6	M	150
18	GT	67	(United States) New Century - The Racer's Group	(Canada) Robert Julien (Germany) Pierre Ehret	Porsche 911 GT3-RSR	M	147
18	GT	67	(United States) New Century - The Racer's Group	(Canada) Robert Julien (Germany) Pierre Ehret	Porsche 3.6L Flat-6	M	147
19	LMP2	56	(United States) Miracle Motorsports (United States) Team Bucknum Racing	(United States) Jeff Bucknum (United States) Bryan Willman (United States) Chris McMurry	Lola B2K/40	Y	145
19	LMP2	56	(United States) Miracle Motorsports (United States) Team Bucknum Racing	(United States) Jeff Bucknum (United States) Bryan Willman (United States) Chris McMurry	Nissan (AER) VQL 3.0L V6	Y	145
20 DNF	LMP2	10	(United States) Miracle Motorsports	(United States) Ian James (United States) James Gue	Courage C65	Y	138
20 DNF	LMP2	10	(United States) Miracle Motorsports	(United States) Ian James (United States) James Gue	MG (AER) XP20 2.0L Turbo I4	Y	138
21 DNF	GT	60	(United Kingdom) P.K. Sport	(United States) Liz Halliday (United Kingdom) Piers Masarati	Porsche 911 GT3-RS	Y	108
21 DNF	GT	60	(United Kingdom) P.K. Sport	(United States) Liz Halliday (United Kingdom) Piers Masarati	Porsche 3.6L Flat-6	Y	108
22 DNF	LMP1	37	(United States) Intersport Racing	(United States) Jon Field (United States) Duncan Dayton	Lola B01/60	G	102
22 DNF	LMP1	37	(United States) Intersport Racing	(United States) Jon Field (United States) Duncan Dayton	Judd KV675 3.4L V8	G	102
23 DNF	LMP1	27	(United Kingdom) Creation Autosportif	(United Kingdom) Jamie Campbell-Walter (France) Nicolas Minassian	DBA 03S	D	83
23 DNF	LMP1	27	(United Kingdom) Creation Autosportif	(United Kingdom) Jamie Campbell-Walter (France) Nicolas Minassian	Zytek ZG348 3.4L V8	D	83
24 DNF	LMP1	20	(United States) Dyson Racing	(United States) Chris Dyson (United Kingdom) Andy Wallace	MG-Lola EX257	G	54
24 DNF	LMP1	20	(United States) Dyson Racing	(United States) Chris Dyson (United Kingdom) Andy Wallace	MG (AER) XP20 2.0L Turbo I4	G	54
25 DNF	GTS	71	(United States) Carsport America	(United States) Tom Weickardt (France) Jean-Philippe Belloc	Dodge Viper GTS-R	P	43
25 DNF	GTS	71	(United States) Carsport America	(United States) Tom Weickardt (France) Jean-Philippe Belloc	Dodge 8.0L V10	P	43

== Statistics ==
- Pole Position - #27 Creation Autosportif - 1:15.893
- Fastest Lap - #38 ADT Champion Racing - 1:17.134
- Distance - 378.222 miles (608.689 km)
- Average Speed - 94.221 mph (151.634 km/h)

American Le Mans Series
Previous race: 2004 Petit Le Mans	2004 season	Next race: None
