= 2004 Petit Le Mans =

Sportscar endurance race in Georgia, US

Track map of Road Atlanta

The 2004 Petit Le Mans was the eighth race for the 2004 American Le Mans Series season and held at Road Atlanta. It took place on September 25, 2004.

== Official results ==
Class winners in bold. Cars failing to complete 70% of winner's distance marked as Not Classified (NC).

Pos	Class	No	Team	Drivers	Chassis	Tyre	Laps
Pos	Class	No	Team	Drivers	Engine	Tyre	Laps
1	**LMP1**	**38**	**(United States) ADT Champion Racing**	**(Germany) Marco Werner (Finland) JJ Lehto**	**Audi R8**	M	**394**
1	**LMP1**	**38**	**(United States) ADT Champion Racing**	**(Germany) Marco Werner (Finland) JJ Lehto**	**Audi 3.6 L Turbo V8**	M	**394**
2	LMP1	2	(United States) ADT Champion Racing	(United Kingdom) Johnny Herbert (Switzerland) Pierre Kaffer	Audi R8	M	391
2	LMP1	2	(United States) ADT Champion Racing	(United Kingdom) Johnny Herbert (Switzerland) Pierre Kaffer	Audi 3.6 L Turbo V8	M	391
3	LMP1	20	(United States) Dyson Racing	(United States) Chris Dyson (Netherlands) Jan Lammers	MG-Lola EX257	G	383
3	LMP1	20	(United States) Dyson Racing	(United States) Chris Dyson (Netherlands) Jan Lammers	MG (AER) XP20 2.0 L Turbo I4	G	383
4	**GTS**	**4**	**(United States) Corvette Racing**	**(United Kingdom) Oliver Gavin (Monaco) Olivier Beretta (Denmark) Jan Magnussen**	**Chevrolet Corvette C5-R**	M	**376**
4	**GTS**	**4**	**(United States) Corvette Racing**	**(United Kingdom) Oliver Gavin (Monaco) Olivier Beretta (Denmark) Jan Magnussen**	**Chevrolet LS7R 7.0 L V8**	M	**376**
5	GTS	3	(United States) Corvette Racing	(Canada) Ron Fellows (United States) Johnny O'Connell (Italy) Max Papis	Chevrolet Corvette C5-R	M	375
5	GTS	3	(United States) Corvette Racing	(Canada) Ron Fellows (United States) Johnny O'Connell (Italy) Max Papis	Chevrolet LS7R 7.0 L V8	M	375
6	**LMP2**	**30**	**(United States) Intersport Racing (United States) Citgo Racing**	**(United States) Clint Field (United Kingdom) Robin Liddell (Venezuela) Milka Duno**	**Lola B2K/40**	P	**369**
6	**LMP2**	**30**	**(United States) Intersport Racing (United States) Citgo Racing**	**(United States) Clint Field (United Kingdom) Robin Liddell (Venezuela) Milka Duno**	**Judd KV675 3.4 L V8**	P	**369**
7	**GT**	**23**	**(United States) Alex Job Racing**	**(Germany) Jörg Bergmeister (Germany) Timo Bernhard (Germany) Sascha Maassen**	**Porsche 911 GT3-RSR**	M	**360**
7	**GT**	**23**	**(United States) Alex Job Racing**	**(Germany) Jörg Bergmeister (Germany) Timo Bernhard (Germany) Sascha Maassen**	**Porsche 3.6 L Flat-6**	M	**360**
8	GT	24	(United States) Alex Job Racing	(Germany) Marc Lieb (France) Romain Dumas (Germany) Wolf Henzler	Porsche 911 GT3-RSR	M	360
8	GT	24	(United States) Alex Job Racing	(Germany) Marc Lieb (France) Romain Dumas (Germany) Wolf Henzler	Porsche 3.6 L Flat-6	M	360
9	LMP1	16	(United States) Dyson Racing	(United States) Butch Leitzinger (United Kingdom) James Weaver (United Kingdom) Andy Wallace	MG-Lola EX257	G	357
9	LMP1	16	(United States) Dyson Racing	(United States) Butch Leitzinger (United Kingdom) James Weaver (United Kingdom) Andy Wallace	MG (AER) XP20 2.0 L Turbo I4	G	357
10	GT	31	(United States) White Lightning Racing	(United States) David Murry (United States) Craig Stanton	Porsche 911 GT3-RSR	M	357
10	GT	31	(United States) White Lightning Racing	(United States) David Murry (United States) Craig Stanton	Porsche 3.6 L Flat-6	M	357
11	GT	35	(United States) Risi Competizione	(United States) Anthony Lazzaro (Germany) Ralf Kelleners (Italy) Fabrizio de Simone	Ferrari 360 Modena GTC	P	355
11	GT	35	(United States) Risi Competizione	(United States) Anthony Lazzaro (Germany) Ralf Kelleners (Italy) Fabrizio de Simone	Ferrari 3.6 L V8	P	355
12	GT	45	(United States) Flying Lizard Motorsports	(United States) Johannes van Overbeek (United States) Darren Law (Netherlands) Patrick Huisman	Porsche 911 GT3-RSR	M	353
12	GT	45	(United States) Flying Lizard Motorsports	(United States) Johannes van Overbeek (United States) Darren Law (Netherlands) Patrick Huisman	Porsche 3.6 L Flat-6	M	353
13	GT	43	(United States) BAM!	(United States) Leo Hindery (Germany) Lucas Luhr (United Kingdom) Adam Jones	Porsche 911 GT3-RSR	M	351
13	GT	43	(United States) BAM!	(United States) Leo Hindery (Germany) Lucas Luhr (United Kingdom) Adam Jones	Porsche 3.6 L Flat-6	M	351
14	GT	66	(United States) New Century - The Racer's Group	(United States) Patrick Long (United States) Cort Wagner (Germany) Mike Rockenfeller	Porsche 911 GT3-RSR	M	350
14	GT	66	(United States) New Century - The Racer's Group	(United States) Patrick Long (United States) Cort Wagner (Germany) Mike Rockenfeller	Porsche 3.6 L Flat-6	M	350
15	GT	79	(United States) J-3 Racing	(United States) Justin Jackson (United Kingdom) Tim Sugden (France) Xavier Pompidou	Porsche 911 GT3-RSR	M	350
15	GT	79	(United States) J-3 Racing	(United States) Justin Jackson (United Kingdom) Tim Sugden (France) Xavier Pompidou	Porsche 3.6 L Flat-6	M	350
16	GT	67	(United States) New Century - The Racer's Group	(United States) Philip Collin (Germany) Pierre Ehret (United Kingdom) Robert Nearn	Porsche 911 GT3-RSR	M	349
16	GT	67	(United States) New Century - The Racer's Group	(United States) Philip Collin (Germany) Pierre Ehret (United Kingdom) Robert Nearn	Porsche 3.6 L Flat-6	M	349
17	GT	93	(United Kingdom) Cirtek Motorsport	(France) Christophe Bouchut (France) Stéphane Ortelli	Porsche 911 GT3-RSR	D	348
17	GT	93	(United Kingdom) Cirtek Motorsport	(France) Christophe Bouchut (France) Stéphane Ortelli	Porsche 3.6 L Flat-6	D	348
18	LMP2	13	(United States) Marshall Cooke Racing	(United States) Andy Lally (United States) Spencer Pumpelly (United States) Ryan Eversley	Lola B2K/40	P	339
18	LMP2	13	(United States) Marshall Cooke Racing	(United States) Andy Lally (United States) Spencer Pumpelly (United States) Ryan Eversley	Ford (Millington) 2.0 L Turbo I4	P	339
19	GTS	71	(United States) Carsport America	(United States) Tom Weickardt (France) Jean-Philippe Belloc (Italy) Fabio Babini	Dodge Viper GTS-R	P	339
19	GTS	71	(United States) Carsport America	(United States) Tom Weickardt (France) Jean-Philippe Belloc (Italy) Fabio Babini	Dodge 8.0 L V10	P	339
20	GTS	63	(United States) ACEMCO Motorsports	(United States) Terry Borcheller (United Kingdom) Johnny Mowlem (Portugal) João Barbosa	Saleen S7-R	P	337
20	GTS	63	(United States) ACEMCO Motorsports	(United States) Terry Borcheller (United Kingdom) Johnny Mowlem (Portugal) João Barbosa	Ford 7.0 L V8	P	337
21 DNF	GTS	6	(United States) Krohn-Barbour Racing	(United States) Tracy Krohn (United States) Joe Fox (Canada) Scott Maxwell	Lamborghini Murciélago R-GT	P	313
21 DNF	GTS	6	(United States) Krohn-Barbour Racing	(United States) Tracy Krohn (United States) Joe Fox (Canada) Scott Maxwell	Lamborghini 6.0 L V12	P	313
22 DNF	GT	8	(United States) Foxhill Racing (United States) Comprent Motor Sports	(United States) Andrew Davis (United States) Michael Cawley (United States) Charles Espenlaub	Porsche 911 GT3-RS	P	306
22 DNF	GT	8	(United States) Foxhill Racing (United States) Comprent Motor Sports	(United States) Andrew Davis (United States) Michael Cawley (United States) Charles Espenlaub	Porsche 3.6 L Flat-6	P	306
23	GT	44	(United States) Flying Lizard Motorsports	(United States) Lonnie Pechnik (United States) Seth Neiman (United States) Jon Fogarty	Porsche 911 GT3-RSR	M	284
23	GT	44	(United States) Flying Lizard Motorsports	(United States) Lonnie Pechnik (United States) Seth Neiman (United States) Jon Fogarty	Porsche 3.6 L Flat-6	M	284
24 NC	GT	50	(United States) Panoz Motor Sports	(United States) Gunnar Jeannette (United Kingdom) Marino Franchitti (France) Christophe Tinseau	Panoz Esperante GT-LM	P	264
24 NC	GT	50	(United States) Panoz Motor Sports	(United States) Gunnar Jeannette (United Kingdom) Marino Franchitti (France) Christophe Tinseau	Ford (Élan) 5.0 L V8	P	264
25 DNF	LMP2	56	(United States) Miracle Motorsports (United States) Team Bucknum Racing	(United States) Jeff Bucknum (United States) Chris McMurry (United States) Bryan Willman	Lola B2K/40	Y	209
25 DNF	LMP2	56	(United States) Miracle Motorsports (United States) Team Bucknum Racing	(United States) Jeff Bucknum (United States) Chris McMurry (United States) Bryan Willman	Nissan (AER) VQL 3.0 L V6	Y	209
26 DNF	GTS	5	(United States) Krohn-Barbour Racing	(Netherlands) Peter Kox (Australia) David Brabham (Sweden) Niclas Jönsson	Lamborghini Murciélago R-GT	P	184
26 DNF	GTS	5	(United States) Krohn-Barbour Racing	(Netherlands) Peter Kox (Australia) David Brabham (Sweden) Niclas Jönsson	Lamborghini 6.0 L V12	P	184
27 DNF	LMP1	27	(United Kingdom) Creation Autosportif	(United Kingdom) Jamie Campbell-Walter (France) Nicolas Minassian	DBA 03S	D	130
27 DNF	LMP1	27	(United Kingdom) Creation Autosportif	(United Kingdom) Jamie Campbell-Walter (France) Nicolas Minassian	Zytek ZG348 3.4 L V8	D	130
28 DNF	LMP2	10	(United States) Miracle Motorsports	(United States) Ian James (United States) John Macaluso (United States) James Gue	Courage C65	Y	128
28 DNF	LMP2	10	(United States) Miracle Motorsports	(United States) Ian James (United States) John Macaluso (United States) James Gue	MG (AER) XP20 2.0 L Turbo I4	Y	128
29 DNF	GT	60	(United Kingdom) P.K. Sport	(United States) Liz Halliday (United Kingdom) Piers Masarati (United Kingdom) Ian Donaldson	Porsche 911 GT3-RS	P	127
29 DNF	GT	60	(United Kingdom) P.K. Sport	(United States) Liz Halliday (United Kingdom) Piers Masarati (United Kingdom) Ian Donaldson	Porsche 3.6 L Flat-6	P	127
30 DNF	LMP1	37	(United States) Intersport Racing	(United States) Jon Field (United States) Duncan Dayton (United States) Mike Durand	Lola B01/60	G	120
30 DNF	LMP1	37	(United States) Intersport Racing	(United States) Jon Field (United States) Duncan Dayton (United States) Mike Durand	Judd KV675 3.4 L V8	G	120
31 DNF	LMP2	19	(United States) Van der Steur Racing	(United States) Gunnar van der Steur (United States) Eric van der Steur (United Kingdom) Ben Devlin	Lola B2K/40	Y	107
31 DNF	LMP2	19	(United States) Van der Steur Racing	(United States) Gunnar van der Steur (United States) Eric van der Steur (United Kingdom) Ben Devlin	Nissan (AER) VQL 3.0 L V6	Y	107
32 DNF	GT	92	(United Kingdom) Cirtek Motorsport	(Italy) Andrea Montermini (United Kingdom) Frank Mountain (New Zealand) Rob Wilson	Ferrari 360 Modena GTC	D	64
32 DNF	GT	92	(United Kingdom) Cirtek Motorsport	(Italy) Andrea Montermini (United Kingdom) Frank Mountain (New Zealand) Rob Wilson	Ferrari 3.6 L V8	D	64
33 DNF	LMP1	12	(United States) Autocon Motorsports	(United States) Michael Lewis (United States) Tomy Drissi (Canada) Melanie Paterson	Riley & Scott Mk III C	D	12
33 DNF	LMP1	12	(United States) Autocon Motorsports	(United States) Michael Lewis (United States) Tomy Drissi (Canada) Melanie Paterson	Élan 5.0 L V8	D	12
34 DNF	GT	78	(United States) J-3 Racing (United States) Hyper Sport Competition	(Puerto Rico) Manuel Matos (Mexico) Randy Wars (United States) Rick Skelton	Porsche 911 GT3-RS	M	11
34 DNF	GT	78	(United States) J-3 Racing (United States) Hyper Sport Competition	(Puerto Rico) Manuel Matos (Mexico) Randy Wars (United States) Rick Skelton	Porsche 3.6 L Flat-6	M	11

== Statistics ==
- Pole Position - #16 Dyson Racing - 1:12.136
- Fastest Lap - #38 ADT Champion Racing - 1:13.315
- Distance - 1,000.76 miles (1,610.57 km)
- Average Speed - 104.301 mph (167.856 km/h)

American Le Mans Series
Previous race: 2004 Road America 500	2004 season	Next race: 2004 Monterey Sports Car Championships
