= 2004 12 Hours of Sebring =

Sports car endurance race

Track map of the Sebring International Raceway

The 2004 Mobil 1 12 Hours of Sebring was the 52nd running of this auto racing event, and took place on March 20, 2004. This was also the opening race of the 2004 American Le Mans Series season.

== Official results ==
Class winners in bold. Cars failing to complete 70% of winner's distance marked as Not Classified (NC).

Pos	Class	No	Team	Drivers	Chassis	Tyre	Laps
Pos	Class	No	Team	Drivers	Engine	Tyre	Laps
1	**LMP1**	**28**	**(United Kingdom) Audi Sport UK Team Veloqx**	**(United Kingdom) Allan McNish (Germany) Frank Biela (Germany) Pierre Kaffer**	**Audi R8**	MI	**350**
1	**LMP1**	**28**	**(United Kingdom) Audi Sport UK Team Veloqx**	**(United Kingdom) Allan McNish (Germany) Frank Biela (Germany) Pierre Kaffer**	**Audi 3.6 L Turbo V8**	MI	**350**
2	LMP1	38	(United States) ADT Champion Racing	(Germany) Marco Werner (Italy) Emanuele Pirro (Finland) JJ Lehto	Audi R8	MI	345
2	LMP1	38	(United States) ADT Champion Racing	(Germany) Marco Werner (Italy) Emanuele Pirro (Finland) JJ Lehto	Audi 3.6 L Turbo V8	MI	345
3	LMP1	88	(United Kingdom) Audi Sport UK Team Veloqx	(United Kingdom) Johnny Herbert (United Kingdom) Jamie Davies (United Kingdom) Guy Smith	Audi R8	MI	338
3	LMP1	88	(United Kingdom) Audi Sport UK Team Veloqx	(United Kingdom) Johnny Herbert (United Kingdom) Jamie Davies (United Kingdom) Guy Smith	Audi 3.6 L Turbo V8	MI	338
4	**GTS**	**3**	**(United States) Corvette Racing**	**(Canada) Ron Fellows (United States) Johnny O'Connell (Italy) Max Papis**	**Chevrolet Corvette C5-R**	MI	**329**
4	**GTS**	**3**	**(United States) Corvette Racing**	**(Canada) Ron Fellows (United States) Johnny O'Connell (Italy) Max Papis**	**Chevrolet LS7-R 7.0 L V8**	MI	**329**
5	LMP1	22	(United Kingdom) Rollcentre Racing	(United Kingdom) Martin Short (United Kingdom) Rob Barff (Portugal) João Barbosa	Dallara SP1	D	326
5	LMP1	22	(United Kingdom) Rollcentre Racing	(United Kingdom) Martin Short (United Kingdom) Rob Barff (Portugal) João Barbosa	Judd GV4 4.0 L V10	D	326
6	LMP1	16	(United States) Dyson Racing	(United States) Butch Leitzinger (United Kingdom) Andy Wallace (United Kingdom) James Weaver	MG-Lola EX257	G	323
6	LMP1	16	(United States) Dyson Racing	(United States) Butch Leitzinger (United Kingdom) Andy Wallace (United Kingdom) James Weaver	MG (AER) XP20 2.0 L Turbo I4	G	323
7	LMP1	12	(United States) Autocon Motorsports	(United States) Tomy Drissi (United States) Michael Lewis (United States) Vic Rice	Riley & Scott Mk III C	D	321
7	LMP1	12	(United States) Autocon Motorsports	(United States) Tomy Drissi (United States) Michael Lewis (United States) Vic Rice	Lincoln (Élan) 5.0 L V8	D	321
8	**GT**	**23**	**(United States) Alex Job Racing**	**(Germany) Timo Bernhard (Germany) Sascha Maassen**	**Porsche 911 GT3-RSR**	MI	**317**
8	**GT**	**23**	**(United States) Alex Job Racing**	**(Germany) Timo Bernhard (Germany) Sascha Maassen**	**Porsche 3.6 L Flat-6**	MI	**317**
9	LMP1	86	(France) Larbre Compétition (United States) Panoz Motor Sports	(France) Christophe Bouchut (France) Jean-Luc Blanchemain (France) Roland Bervillé	Panoz GTP	MI	317
9	LMP1	86	(France) Larbre Compétition (United States) Panoz Motor Sports	(France) Christophe Bouchut (France) Jean-Luc Blanchemain (France) Roland Bervillé	Élan 6L8 6.0 L V8	MI	317
10	GT	24	(United States) Alex Job Racing	(Germany) Lucas Luhr (France) Romain Dumas (Germany) Marc Lieb	Porsche 911 GT3-RSR	MI	317
10	GT	24	(United States) Alex Job Racing	(Germany) Lucas Luhr (France) Romain Dumas (Germany) Marc Lieb	Porsche 3.6L Flat-6	MI	317
11	GT	31	(United States) White Lightning Racing	(United States) David Murry (United States) Craig Stanton	Porsche 911 GT3-RS	MI	311
11	GT	31	(United States) White Lightning Racing	(United States) David Murry (United States) Craig Stanton	Porsche 3.6 L Flat-6	MI	311
12	GT	45	(United States) Flying Lizard Motorsports	(United States) Johannes van Overbeek (United States) Darren Law (United States) Jon Fogarty	Porsche 911 GT3-RSR	MI	311
12	GT	45	(United States) Flying Lizard Motorsports	(United States) Johannes van Overbeek (United States) Darren Law (United States) Jon Fogarty	Porsche 3.6 L Flat-6	MI	311
13	GT	43	(United States) BAM!	(Germany) Mike Rockenfeller (United States) Peter Baron (United States) Leo Hindery	Porsche 911 GT3-RS	MI	309
13	GT	43	(United States) BAM!	(Germany) Mike Rockenfeller (United States) Peter Baron (United States) Leo Hindery	Porsche 3.6 L Flat-6	MI	309
14	GT	79	(United States) J3 Racing	(United States) Justin Jackson (United States) Brian Cunningham (United Kingdom) Tim Sugden	Porsche 911 GT3-RSR	MI	307
14	GT	79	(United States) J3 Racing	(United States) Justin Jackson (United States) Brian Cunningham (United Kingdom) Tim Sugden	Porsche 3.6 L Flat-6	MI	307
15	GTS	25	(Netherlands) Barron Connor Racing	(United States) Danny Sullivan (Netherlands) John Bosch (Italy) Thomas Biagi	Ferrari 575-GTC Maranello	P	307
15	GTS	25	(Netherlands) Barron Connor Racing	(United States) Danny Sullivan (Netherlands) John Bosch (Italy) Thomas Biagi	Ferrari 6.0 L V12	P	307
16	GT	35	(United States) Risi Competizione	(United States) Anthony Lazzaro (Germany) Ralf Kelleners (Italy) Matteo Bobbi	Ferrari 360 Modena GTC	P	304
16	GT	35	(United States) Risi Competizione	(United States) Anthony Lazzaro (Germany) Ralf Kelleners (Italy) Matteo Bobbi	Ferrari 3.6 L V8	P	304
17	LMP1	37	(United States) Intersport Racing	(United States) Jon Field (United States) Duncan Dayton (United States) Larry Connor	Lola B01/60	G	302
17	LMP1	37	(United States) Intersport Racing	(United States) Jon Field (United States) Duncan Dayton (United States) Larry Connor	Judd KV675 3.4 L V8	G	302
18	GT	66	(United States) New Century - The Racer's Group	(United States) Patrick Long (United States) Cort Wagner (United States) Kelly Collins	Porsche 911 GT3-RSR	MI	302
18	GT	66	(United States) New Century - The Racer's Group	(United States) Patrick Long (United States) Cort Wagner (United States) Kelly Collins	Porsche 3.6 L Flat-6	MI	302
19	GT	68	(United States) The Racer's Group	(United Kingdom) Piers Masarati (United Kingdom) Gregor Fisken (United Kingdom) Ian Donaldson	Porsche 911 GT3-RS	MI	299
19	GT	68	(United States) The Racer's Group	(United Kingdom) Piers Masarati (United Kingdom) Gregor Fisken (United Kingdom) Ian Donaldson	Porsche 3.6 L Flat-6	MI	299
20	GT	49	(United Kingdom) Morgan Works Racing Team	(New Zealand) Neil Cunningham (United Kingdom) Keith Ahlers (United Kingdom) Adam Sharpe	Morgan Aero 8-R	Y	281
20	GT	49	(United Kingdom) Morgan Works Racing Team	(New Zealand) Neil Cunningham (United Kingdom) Keith Ahlers (United Kingdom) Adam Sharpe	BMW (Mader) 4.5 L V8	Y	281
21	GT	78	(United States) J3 Racing	(United States) Dorsey Porter Jr. (United States) Romeo Kapudija (Sweden) Niclas Jönsson	Porsche 911 GT3-RS	MI	275
21	GT	78	(United States) J3 Racing	(United States) Dorsey Porter Jr. (United States) Romeo Kapudija (Sweden) Niclas Jönsson	Porsche 3.6 L Flat-6	MI	275
22	LMP1	15	(United States) Citgo Racing (United Kingdom) Taurus Racing	(Venezuela) Milka Duno (United Kingdom) Justin Wilson (United Kingdom) Phil Andrews	Lola B2K/10	D	270
22	LMP1	15	(United States) Citgo Racing (United Kingdom) Taurus Racing	(Venezuela) Milka Duno (United Kingdom) Justin Wilson (United Kingdom) Phil Andrews	Judd GV4 4.0 L V10	D	270
23	**LMP2**	**10**	**(United States) American Spirit Racing (United States) Miracle Motorsports**	**(United Kingdom) Ian James (United States) John Macaluso (United States) Mike Borkowski**	**Lola B2K/40**	P	**264**
23	**LMP2**	**10**	**(United States) American Spirit Racing (United States) Miracle Motorsports**	**(United Kingdom) Ian James (United States) John Macaluso (United States) Mike Borkowski**	**Nissan (AER) VQL 3.0 L V6**	P	**264**
24	GT	91	(United Kingdom) Chamberlain-Synergy Motorsport	(United Kingdom) Christopher Stockton (United Kingdom) Gareth Evans (United Kingdom) Amanda Stretton	TVR Tuscan T400R	D	262
24	GT	91	(United Kingdom) Chamberlain-Synergy Motorsport	(United Kingdom) Christopher Stockton (United Kingdom) Gareth Evans (United Kingdom) Amanda Stretton	TVR Speed Six 4.0 L I6	D	262
25	GTS	63	(United States) ACEMCO Motorsports	(United States) Terry Borcheller (United Kingdom) Johnny Mowlem (Australia) David Brabham	Saleen S7-R	P	257
25	GTS	63	(United States) ACEMCO Motorsports	(United States) Terry Borcheller (United Kingdom) Johnny Mowlem (Australia) David Brabham	Ford 7.0 L V8	P	257
26	LMP2	7	(United States) Rand Racing	(United States) Bill Rand (United States) James Gue (United States) Mike Fitzgerald	Lola B2K/40	Y	248
26	LMP2	7	(United States) Rand Racing	(United States) Bill Rand (United States) James Gue (United States) Mike Fitzgerald	Nissan (AER) VQL 3.0 L V6	Y	248
27 NC	LMP2	30	(United States) Intersport Racing	(United States) William Binnie (United States) Clint Field (United States) Rick Sutherland	Lola B2K/40	P	232
27 NC	LMP2	30	(United States) Intersport Racing	(United States) William Binnie (United States) Clint Field (United States) Rick Sutherland	Judd KV675 3.4 L V8	P	232
28 DNF	GT	32	(United Kingdom) Cirtek Motorsport	(New Zealand) Rob Wilson (United Kingdom) Frank Mountain (United Kingdom) Robert Brooks	Porsche 911 GT3-RSR	D	215
28 DNF	GT	32	(United Kingdom) Cirtek Motorsport	(New Zealand) Rob Wilson (United Kingdom) Frank Mountain (United Kingdom) Robert Brooks	Porsche 3.6 L Flat-6	D	215
29 DNF	GT	61	(United Kingdom) P.K. Sport	(Italy) Alex Caffi (United Kingdom) David Warnock (United States) Tracy Krohn	Porsche 911 GT3-RS	P	214
29 DNF	GT	61	(United Kingdom) P.K. Sport	(Italy) Alex Caffi (United Kingdom) David Warnock (United States) Tracy Krohn	Porsche 3.6 L Flat-6	P	214
30 DNF	LMP2	56	(United States) Team Bucknum Racing	(United States) Jeff Bucknum (United States) Chris McMurry (United States) Bryan Willman	Pilbeam MP91	D	181
30 DNF	LMP2	56	(United States) Team Bucknum Racing	(United States) Jeff Bucknum (United States) Chris McMurry (United States) Bryan Willman	Nissan (AER) VQL 3.0 L V6	D	181
31 DNF	GT	60	(United Kingdom) P.K. Sport	(United Kingdom) Robin Liddell (United States) Hugh Plumb (United States) Peter Boss	Porsche 911 GT3-RS	P	167
31 DNF	GT	60	(United Kingdom) P.K. Sport	(United Kingdom) Robin Liddell (United States) Hugh Plumb (United States) Peter Boss	Porsche 3.6 L Flat-6	P	167
32 DNF	GTS	71	(United States) Carsport America	(United States) Tom Weickardt (United States) Kevin Allen (France) Jean-Philippe Belloc	Dodge Viper GTS-R	P	121
32 DNF	GTS	71	(United States) Carsport America	(United States) Tom Weickardt (United States) Kevin Allen (France) Jean-Philippe Belloc	Dodge 8.0 L V10	P	121
33 DNF	GT	92	(United Kingdom) Chamberlain-Synergy Motorsport	(United Kingdom) Bob Berridge (United Kingdom) Lee Caroline (United Kingdom) Michael Caine	TVR Tuscan T400R	D	120
33 DNF	GT	92	(United Kingdom) Chamberlain-Synergy Motorsport	(United Kingdom) Bob Berridge (United Kingdom) Lee Caroline (United Kingdom) Michael Caine	TVR Speed Six 4.0 L I6	D	120
34 DNF	LMP2	11	(United States) American Spirit Racing (United States) Miracle Motorsports	(United States) Bobby Sak (United States) Jason Workman (United States) Scott Bradley	Lola B2K/40	P	108
34 DNF	LMP2	11	(United States) American Spirit Racing (United States) Miracle Motorsports	(United States) Bobby Sak (United States) Jason Workman (United States) Scott Bradley	Nissan (AER) VQL 3.0 L V6	P	108
35 DNF	LMP1	20	(United Kingdom) Dyson Racing	(United Kingdom) Chris Dyson (Netherlands) Jan Lammers (Belgium) Didier de Radigues	MG-Lola EX257	G	106
35 DNF	LMP1	20	(United Kingdom) Dyson Racing	(United Kingdom) Chris Dyson (Netherlands) Jan Lammers (Belgium) Didier de Radigues	MG (AER) XP20 2.0 L Turbo I4	G	106
36 DNF	GTS	26	(Netherlands) Barron Connor Racing	(Netherlands) Mike Hezemans (France) Ange Barde (Switzerland) Jean-Denis Délétraz	Ferrari 575-GTC Maranello	P	101
36 DNF	GTS	26	(Netherlands) Barron Connor Racing	(Netherlands) Mike Hezemans (France) Ange Barde (Switzerland) Jean-Denis Délétraz	Ferrari 6.0 L V12	P	101
37 DNF	GT	44	(United States) Flying Lizard Motorsports	(United States) Lonnie Pechnik (United States) Seth Neiman (United States) Peter Cunningham	Porsche 911 GT3-RS	MI	100
37 DNF	GT	44	(United States) Flying Lizard Motorsports	(United States) Lonnie Pechnik (United States) Seth Neiman (United States) Peter Cunningham	Porsche 3.6 L Flat-6	MI	100
38 DNF	GT	67	(United States) New Century - The Racer's Group	(United States) Marc Bunting (Germany) Pierre Ehret (United States) Jim Matthews	Porsche 911 GT3-RSR	MI	94
38 DNF	GT	67	(United States) New Century - The Racer's Group	(United States) Marc Bunting (Germany) Pierre Ehret (United States) Jim Matthews	Porsche 3.6 L Flat-6	MI	94
39 DNF	GTS	4	(United States) Corvette Racing	(United Kingdom) Oliver Gavin (Monaco) Olivier Beretta (Denmark) Jan Magnussen	Chevrolet Corvette C5-R	MI	83
39 DNF	GTS	4	(United States) Corvette Racing	(United Kingdom) Oliver Gavin (Monaco) Olivier Beretta (Denmark) Jan Magnussen	Chevrolet LS7-R 7.0L V8	MI	83
40 DNF	LMP1	33	(United States) Intersport Racing	(United States) Mike Durand (United States) Chad Block (France) Georges Forgeois	Riley & Scott Mk III C	G	62
40 DNF	LMP1	33	(United States) Intersport Racing	(United States) Mike Durand (United States) Chad Block (France) Georges Forgeois	Élan 6L8 6.0 L V8	G	62
41 DNF	GT	52	(Germany) Seikel Motorsport	(United States) Philip Collin (United States) Grady Willingham (Canada) Tony Burgess	Porsche 911 GT3-RS	Y	47
41 DNF	GT	52	(Germany) Seikel Motorsport	(United States) Philip Collin (United States) Grady Willingham (Canada) Tony Burgess	Porsche 3.6 L Flat-6	Y	47
42 DNF	LMP2	8	(United States) Rand Racing	(United States) Derek Hill (United States) Andy Lally (United Kingdom) Marino Franchitti	Lola B2K/40	Y	12
42 DNF	LMP2	8	(United States) Rand Racing	(United States) Derek Hill (United States) Andy Lally (United Kingdom) Marino Franchitti	Nissan (AER) VQL 3.0 L V6	Y	12
43 DNF	LMP1	50	(United Kingdom) Team Elite	(United States) Jay Cochran (United States) Ed Zabinski (Republic of Ireland) Damien Faulkner	Lotus Elise GT1	D	7
43 DNF	LMP1	50	(United Kingdom) Team Elite	(United States) Jay Cochran (United States) Ed Zabinski (Republic of Ireland) Damien Faulkner	Chevrolet LT5 6.0 L V8	D	7
44 DNF	LMP2	19	(United States) Van der Steur Racing	(United States) Gunnar van der Steur (United States) Spencer Pumpelly (United States) Eric van der Steur	Lola B2K/40	Y	2
44 DNF	LMP2	19	(United States) Van der Steur Racing	(United States) Gunnar van der Steur (United States) Spencer Pumpelly (United States) Eric van der Steur	Nissan (AER) VQL 3.0 L V6	Y	2

== Statistics ==
- Pole Position - #38 ADT Champion Racing - 1:48.710
- Fastest Lap - #38 ADT Champion Racing 1:49.443
- Distance - 1,295 miles (2,084 km)
- Average Speed - 107.711 mph (173.344 km/h)

American Le Mans Series
Previous race: None	2004 season	Next race: 2004 American Le Mans at Mid-Ohio
