= Lola B2K/40 =

Prototype race car

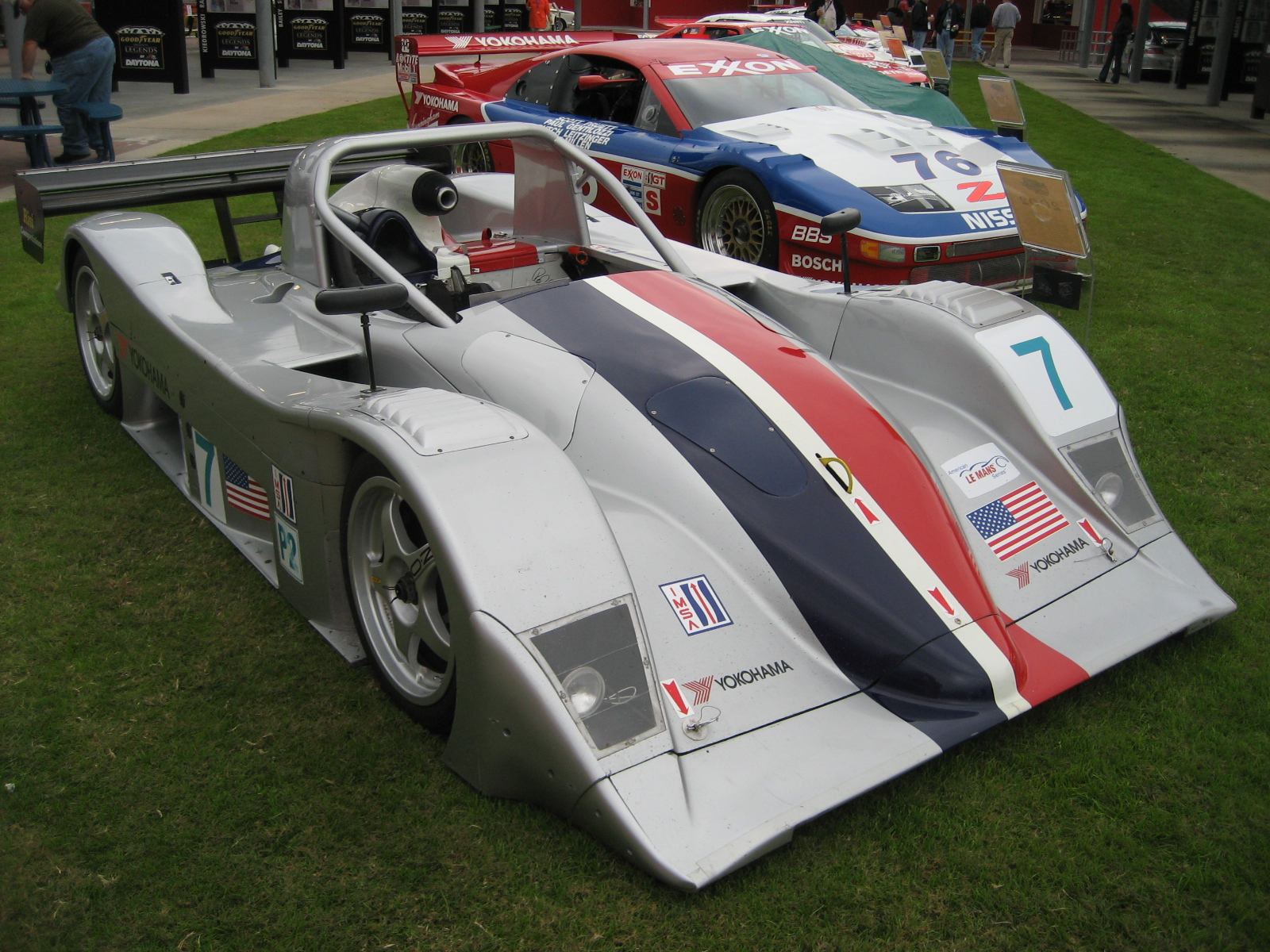
A B2K/40 formerly used by Rand Racing

The Lola B2K/40 was a Le Mans Prototype developed in 2000 by Lola Cars International as a cheaper, smaller, and lighter alternative to the similar Lola B2K/10. Although specifically designed to compete in the SR2 class of the Sports Racing World Cup and Grand American Road Racing Championship, it would later be adapted to the LMP675 and LMP2 classes for the 24 Hours of Le Mans and American Le Mans Series. This design was replaced in 2005 by the Lola B05/40 and would last be used in competition in 2006.

== Development ==
Although the B2K/40 shared some mechanical elements with the larger B2K/10, the design was more simplified for the sake of ease of use. Unlike the raised footbox B2K/10 and large protruding nose caused by this footbox, the B2K/40 would employ a simplified footbox and a flattened nose, although it still featured a raised element in the middle to help air flow between the cockpit and fenders. The fenders themselves were also much simpler, using a narrow wedge shape instead of the sweeping curves of the B2K/10. Intakes for the radiators would be placed inside the fenders, instead of on the outer edge as on the B2K/10. A single air intake underneath the rollbar would be employed for feeding the engine, although the B2K/40 employed a cylindrical nacelle instead of the large scoop that was sometimes used on the B2K/10. Some later chassis employed turbocharged engines, which required the addition of an intake for the turbocharger. Various designs were used over the years.

For an engine, the chosen Lola unit was a small, production based V6 that was stipulated by SR2 class rules. Advanced Engine Research had an agreement with Nissan to modify their production VQ 3.0 Litre V6 for use in the SR2 class. However, as a customer car, the AER-Nissan unit was not put into all cars, and other engines have been used over the chassis' lifetime. Such choices included a Mazda turbocharged 2-rotor, a Judd V8, a Porsche Flat-6, and a Ford turbocharged Inline-4 developed by Millington.

A total of sixteen B2K/40s were built.

== Racing history ==
Debuting during the middle of the 2000 season, the first B2K/40s were delivered to various customers in the Grand American Road Racing Championship and American Le Mans Series in North American, and Sports Racing World Cup in Europe. Snow/Schumacher Racing, Archangel Motorsports and TRP Racing would run the USRRC season, while KnightHawk Racing and Phillips Motorsports would run ALMS with Snow/Schumacher Racing making two appearances at the end of the season. SportsRacing Team Sweden would be the only B2K/40 runner in the Sports Racing World Cup. The B2K/40s would perform well in the USRRC series, gaining five class wins, four for Archangel and one for Snow/Schumacher, and earning Archangel the SR2 class championship. In the ALMS, Snow/Schumacher would take a best result of 11th at Petit Le Mans, while SportsRacing Team Sweden would take a single win in the final round of the Sports Racing World Cup. However, the best achievement of the season would be at the 24 Hours of Le Mans, where Multimatic Motorsports took the LMP675 class win, finishing 25th overall and one of only two competitors in its class to finish.

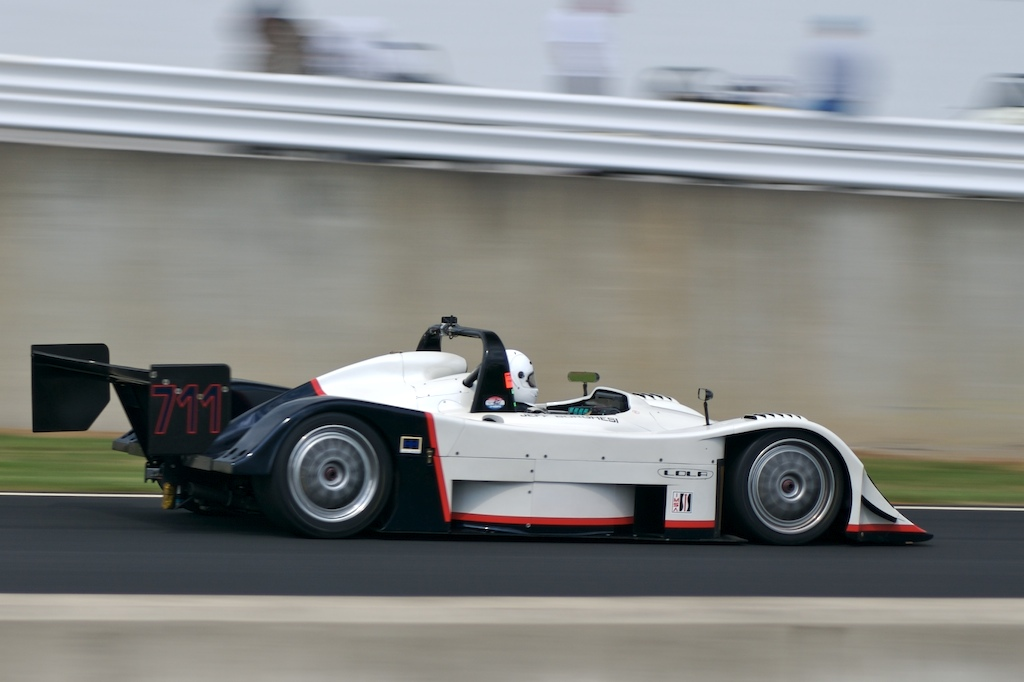
Another B2K/40 in use in Historic Sportscar Racing

For 2001, the number of B2K/40s in competition would nearly double. USRRC saw the return of Snow/Schumacher, Archangel, and TRP while gaining Northstar Racing, Porschehaus Racing, followed by Multimatic Motorsports and Rand Racing. The ALMS would see only Roock-KnightHawk Racing competing regularly in the new LMP675 class, while the Sports Racing World Cup (now renamed the FIA Sportscar Championship) would see SportsRacing Team Sweden running alone again. USRRC was another dominant year for the B2K/40 with another nine class wins, six for championship winner Archangel, two for Porschehaus, and one for Rand Racing. In Europe, SportsRacing Team Sweden would take four class victories and also take the SR2 championship. KnightHawk would be unable to score a single win in the ALMS season, although they did manage to take second in the LMP675 championship. They were also the only team to enter the 24 Hours of Le Mans, where they failed to finish.

2002 would begin to see continued success for the B2K/40. The USRRC series would see only Rand Racing-Risi Competizione as consistent competitors, with Porschehaus and Archangel Motorsports only making occasional appearances. Although Rand-Risi would be amongst the few SR2 class competitors in the series, they were able to score nine wins and take the championship. However the American Le Mans Series would see a boost in competitors Archangel Motorsports moved to the series, joining occasional runners Spencer Motorsports, Essex Racing, and Kyser Racing. Archangel would take two class victories and finish third in the LMP675 championship. SportsRacing Team Sweden would continue to be the only European squad, but would not be able to repeat their previous success, finishing third in the championship without a single win.

2003 began to see a decline in results for the B2K/40. The Grand American Road Racing Association was beginning a shift towards their Daytona Prototype class, and rule restrictions left the SR2 class uncompetitive. This meant a handful of teams participated in only a select number of races. Team Essex would win class at the 24 Hours of Daytona while G&W Motorsports would win at Virginia International Raceway, earning them the championship due to points earned running a Picchio chassis in the class earlier that season. Essex Racing would be the only competitor in the American Le Mans Series, finishing third in the LMP675 championship yet not earning a single win. SportsRacing Team Sweden's B2K/40 would also not return to the FIA Sportscar Championship.

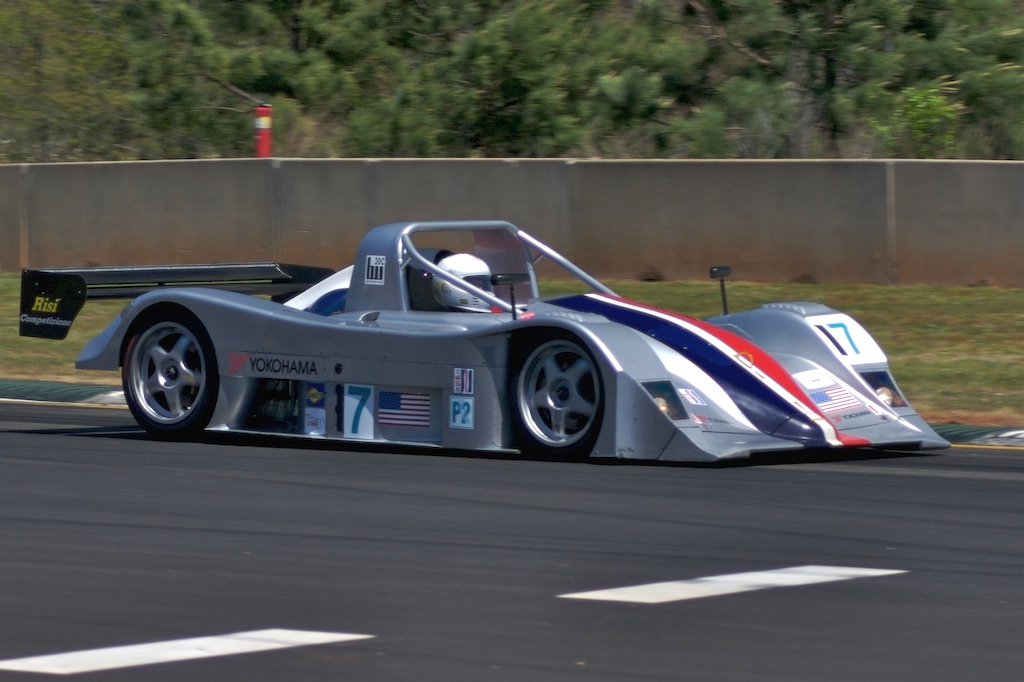
The Rand B2K/40 in use

2004 would see the end of the SR2 class in the USRRC as well as the cancellation of the FIA Sportscar Championship, leaving the American Le Mans Series and new Le Mans Endurance Series as the only area of competition for the B2K/40. Miracle Motorsports, Intersport Racing, Marshall Cooke Race Car Company, and Van der Steur Racing would all regularly compete in the ALMS season, joined by Rand Racing for the 12 Hours of Sebring. B2K/40s would win eight races in the LMP2 class, with six for Intersport and three for Miracle, although it would be Miracle Motorsports who would win the championship, aided by their second car, a Courage C65. Tracsport would be the only competitor in the Le Mans Endurance Series, scoring a best finish of third in class and taking third in the championship. Intersport Racing would also go to the 24 Hours of Le Mans and successfully take the class victory, again one of only two LMP2 class competitors to finish.

For 2005, a change in regulations for the 24 Hours of Le Mans and Le Mans Endurance Series would make the B2K/40 obsolete, while at the same time the new B05/40 was being launched as its replacement. In the American Le Mans Series, the B2K/40 would still be allowed. Van der Steur Racing would be the only consistent competitor, with BAT Competition appearing for a few select races and Intersport running their car for one last time at the 12 Hours of Sebring before upgrading to a B05/40. The team would finish a distant fourth in the LMP2 championship. Van der Steur, strapped for cash, would continue with their B2K/40 into 2006 at select races before finally upgrading to a Radical SR9.
