= 2004 American Le Mans at Mid-Ohio =

The layout of Mid-Ohio Sports Car Course

The 2004 American Le Mans at Mid-Ohio was the second race for the 2004 American Le Mans Series season held at Mid-Ohio sports car course. It took place on June 27, 2004.

== Official results ==
Class winners in bold. Cars failing to complete 70% of winner's distance marked as Not Classified (NC).

Pos	Class	No	Team	Drivers	Chassis	Tyre	Laps
Pos	Class	No	Team	Drivers	Engine	Tyre	Laps
1	**LMP1**	**38**	**(United States) ADT Champion Racing**	**(Germany) Marco Werner (Finland) JJ Lehto**	**Audi R8**	MI	**124**
1	**LMP1**	**38**	**(United States) ADT Champion Racing**	**(Germany) Marco Werner (Finland) JJ Lehto**	**Audi 3.6L Turbo V8**	MI	**124**
2	LMP1	20	(United States) Dyson Racing	(United States) Chris Dyson (United Kingdom) Andy Wallace	MG-Lola EX257	G	123
2	LMP1	20	(United States) Dyson Racing	(United States) Chris Dyson (United Kingdom) Andy Wallace	MG (AER) XP20 2.0L Turbo I4	G	123
3	**GTS**	**3**	**(United States) Corvette Racing**	**(Canada) Ron Fellows (United States) Johnny O'Connell**	**Chevrolet Corvette C5-R**	MI	**118**
3	**GTS**	**3**	**(United States) Corvette Racing**	**(Canada) Ron Fellows (United States) Johnny O'Connell**	**Chevrolet LS7-R 7.0L V8**	MI	**118**
4	GTS	4	(United States) Corvette Racing	(United Kingdom) Oliver Gavin (Monaco) Olivier Beretta	Chevrolet Corvette C5-R	MI	118
4	GTS	4	(United States) Corvette Racing	(United Kingdom) Oliver Gavin (Monaco) Olivier Beretta	Chevrolet LS7-R 7.0L V8	MI	118
5	**LMP2**	**30**	**(United States) Intersport Racing**	**(United States) Clint Field (United Kingdom) Robin Liddell**	**Lola B2K/40**	P	**116**
5	**LMP2**	**30**	**(United States) Intersport Racing**	**(United States) Clint Field (United Kingdom) Robin Liddell**	**Judd KV675 3.4L V8**	P	**116**
6	GTS	63	(United States) ACEMCO Motorsports	(United States) Terry Borcheller (United Kingdom) Johnny Mowlem	Saleen S7-R	P	113
6	GTS	63	(United States) ACEMCO Motorsports	(United States) Terry Borcheller (United Kingdom) Johnny Mowlem	Ford 7.0L V8	P	113
7	GTS	5	(United States) Krohn-Barbour Racing	(Australia) David Brabham (Netherlands) Peter Kox	Lamborghini Murcielago R-GT	P	113
7	GTS	5	(United States) Krohn-Barbour Racing	(Australia) David Brabham (Netherlands) Peter Kox	Lamborghini 6.0L V12	P	113
8	**GT**	**45**	**(United States) Flying Lizard Motorsports**	**(United States) Johannes van Overbeek (United States) Darren Law**	**Porsche 911 GT3-RSR**	MI	**113**
8	**GT**	**45**	**(United States) Flying Lizard Motorsports**	**(United States) Johannes van Overbeek (United States) Darren Law**	**Porsche 3.6L Flat-6**	MI	**113**
9	GT	23	(United States) Alex Job Racing	(Germany) Timo Bernhard (Germany) Jörg Bergmeister	Porsche 911 GT3-RSR	MI	113
9	GT	23	(United States) Alex Job Racing	(Germany) Timo Bernhard (Germany) Jörg Bergmeister	Porsche 3.6L Flat-6	MI	113
10	GT	31	(United States) White Lightning Racing	(United States) Craig Stanton (United States) David Murry	Porsche 911 GT3-RSR	MI	112
10	GT	31	(United States) White Lightning Racing	(United States) Craig Stanton (United States) David Murry	Porsche 3.6L Flat-6	MI	112
11	GT	66	(United States) New Century - The Racer's Group	(United States) Cort Wagner (United States) Patrick Long	Porsche 911 GT3-RSR	MI	112
11	GT	66	(United States) New Century - The Racer's Group	(United States) Cort Wagner (United States) Patrick Long	Porsche 3.6L Flat-6	MI	112
12	LMP2	13	(United States) Marshall Cooke Race Car Company	(United States) Andy Lally (United States) Ryan Eversley	Lola B2K/40	A	111
12	LMP2	13	(United States) Marshall Cooke Race Car Company	(United States) Andy Lally (United States) Ryan Eversley	Ford (Millington) 2.0L Turbo I4	A	111
13	GT	67	(United States) New Century - The Racer's Group	(United States) Jim Matthews (Germany) Pierre Ehret	Porsche 911 GT3-RSR	MI	110
13	GT	67	(United States) New Century - The Racer's Group	(United States) Jim Matthews (Germany) Pierre Ehret	Porsche 3.6L Flat-6	MI	110
14	GT	60	(United Kingdom) P.K. Sport	(United States) Hugh Plumb (United States) Peter Boss	Porsche 911 GT3-RS	P	109
14	GT	60	(United Kingdom) P.K. Sport	(United States) Hugh Plumb (United States) Peter Boss	Porsche 3.6L Flat-6	P	109
15	GT	24	(United States) Alex Job Racing	(Germany) Marc Lieb (France) Romain Dumas	Porsche 911 GT3-RSR	MI	108
15	GT	24	(United States) Alex Job Racing	(Germany) Marc Lieb (France) Romain Dumas	Porsche 3.6L Flat-6	MI	108
16	GT	43	(United States) BAM!	(United States) Leo Hindery (United States) Peter Baron	Porsche 911 GT3-RSR	MI	107
16	GT	43	(United States) BAM!	(United States) Leo Hindery (United States) Peter Baron	Porsche 3.6L Flat-6	MI	107
17	LMP2	10	(United States) Miracle Motorsports	(United States) Ian James (United States) James Gue	Lola B2K/40	Y	106
17	LMP2	10	(United States) Miracle Motorsports	(United States) Ian James (United States) James Gue	Nissan (AER) VQL 3.0L V6	Y	106
18	LMP2	19	(United States) Van der Steur Racing	(United States) Gunnar van der Steur (United States) Eric van der Steur	Lola B2K/40	Y	103
18	LMP2	19	(United States) Van der Steur Racing	(United States) Gunnar van der Steur (United States) Eric van der Steur	Nissan (AER) VQL 3.0L V6	Y	103
19	GT	44	(United States) Flying Lizard Motorsports	(United States) Lonnie Pechnik (United States) Seth Neiman	Porsche 911 GT3-RS	MI	99
19	GT	44	(United States) Flying Lizard Motorsports	(United States) Lonnie Pechnik (United States) Seth Neiman	Porsche 3.6L Flat-6	MI	99
20 NC	LMP1	37	(United States) Intersport Racing	(United States) Jon Field (United States) Duncan Dayton	Lola B01/60	G	80
20 NC	LMP1	37	(United States) Intersport Racing	(United States) Jon Field (United States) Duncan Dayton	Judd KV675 3.4L V8	G	80
21 DNF	GT	79	(United States) J3 Racing	(United States) Justin Jackson (United Kingdom) Tim Sugden	Porsche 911 GT3-RSR	MI	76
21 DNF	GT	79	(United States) J3 Racing	(United States) Justin Jackson (United Kingdom) Tim Sugden	Porsche 3.6L Flat-6	MI	76
22 DNF	GT	50	(United States) Panoz Motor Sports	(United States) Gunnar Jeannette (Belgium) David Saelens	Panoz Esperante GT-LM	P	69
22 DNF	GT	50	(United States) Panoz Motor Sports	(United States) Gunnar Jeannette (Belgium) David Saelens	Ford (Élan) 5.0L V8	P	69
23 DNF	GT	35	(United States) Risi Competizione	(United States) Anthony Lazzaro (Germany) Ralf Kelleners	Ferrari 360 Modena GTC	P	53
23 DNF	GT	35	(United States) Risi Competizione	(United States) Anthony Lazzaro (Germany) Ralf Kelleners	Ferrari 3.6L V8	P	53
24 DNF	LMP1	16	(United States) Dyson Racing	(United States) Butch Leitzinger (United Kingdom) James Weaver	MG-Lola EX257	G	0
24 DNF	LMP1	16	(United States) Dyson Racing	(United States) Butch Leitzinger (United Kingdom) James Weaver	MG (AER) XP20 2.0L Turbo I4	G	0
25 DNF	LMP2	56	(United States) Team Bucknum Racing	(United States) Jeff Bucknum (United States) Bryan Willman (United States) Chris McMurry	Pilbeam MP91	D	0
25 DNF	LMP2	56	(United States) Team Bucknum Racing	(United States) Jeff Bucknum (United States) Bryan Willman (United States) Chris McMurry	Willman 3.4L V6	D	0

== Statistics ==
- Pole Position - #16 Dyson Racing - 1:12.123
- Fastest Lap - #38 ADT Champion Racing - 1:14.636
- Distance - 279.992 miles (450.603 km)
- Average Speed - 101.672 mph (163.625 km/h)

American Le Mans Series
Previous race: 2004 12 Hours of Sebring	2004 season	Next race: 2004 New England Grand Prix
