= 2004 New England Grand Prix =

Track map of Lime Rock Park

The 2004 New England Grand Prix was the third race for the 2004 American Le Mans Series season held at Lime Rock Park. It took place on July 5, 2004.

== Official results ==
Class winners in bold. Cars failing to complete 70% of winner's distance marked as Not Classified (NC).

Pos	Class	No	Team	Drivers	Chassis	Tyre	Laps
Pos	Class	No	Team	Drivers	Engine	Tyre	Laps
1	**LMP1**	**38**	**(United States) ADT Champion Racing**	**(Germany) Marco Werner (Finland) JJ Lehto**	**Audi R8**	M	**165**
1	**LMP1**	**38**	**(United States) ADT Champion Racing**	**(Germany) Marco Werner (Finland) JJ Lehto**	**Audi 3.6L Turbo V8**	M	**165**
2	LMP1	16	(United States) Dyson Racing	(United States) Butch Leitzinger (United Kingdom) James Weaver	MG-Lola EX257	G	165
2	LMP1	16	(United States) Dyson Racing	(United States) Butch Leitzinger (United Kingdom) James Weaver	MG (AER) XP20 2.0L Turbo I4	G	165
3	LMP1	20	(United States) Dyson Racing	(United States) Chris Dyson (United Kingdom) Andy Wallace	MG-Lola EX257	G	163
3	LMP1	20	(United States) Dyson Racing	(United States) Chris Dyson (United Kingdom) Andy Wallace	MG (AER) XP20 2.0L Turbo I4	G	163
4	**GTS**	**4**	**(United States) Corvette Racing**	**(United Kingdom) Oliver Gavin (Monaco) Olivier Beretta**	**Chevrolet Corvette C5-R**	M	**160**
4	**GTS**	**4**	**(United States) Corvette Racing**	**(United Kingdom) Oliver Gavin (Monaco) Olivier Beretta**	**Chevrolet LS7-R 7.0L V8**	M	**160**
5	GTS	3	(United States) Corvette Racing	(Canada) Ron Fellows (United States) Johnny O'Connell	Chevrolet Corvette C5-R	M	160
5	GTS	3	(United States) Corvette Racing	(Canada) Ron Fellows (United States) Johnny O'Connell	Chevrolet LS7-R 7.0L V8	M	160
6	GTS	63	(United States) ACEMCO Motorsports	(United States) Terry Borcheller (United Kingdom) Johnny Mowlem	Saleen S7-R	P	159
6	GTS	63	(United States) ACEMCO Motorsports	(United States) Terry Borcheller (United Kingdom) Johnny Mowlem	Ford 7.0L V8	P	159
7	**GT**	**35**	**(United States) Risi Competizione**	**(Germany) Ralf Kelleners (United States) Anthony Lazzaro**	**Ferrari 360 Modena GTC**	P	**155**
7	**GT**	**35**	**(United States) Risi Competizione**	**(Germany) Ralf Kelleners (United States) Anthony Lazzaro**	**Ferrari 3.6L V8**	P	**155**
8	GT	45	(United States) Flying Lizard Motorsports	(United States) Johannes van Overbeek (United States) Darren Law	Porsche 911 GT3-RSR	M	154
8	GT	45	(United States) Flying Lizard Motorsports	(United States) Johannes van Overbeek (United States) Darren Law	Porsche 3.6L Flat-6	M	154
9	GT	24	(United States) Alex Job Racing	(Germany) Marc Lieb (France) Romain Dumas	Porsche 911 GT3-RSR	M	154
9	GT	24	(United States) Alex Job Racing	(Germany) Marc Lieb (France) Romain Dumas	Porsche 3.6L Flat-6	M	154
10	GT	79	(United States) J-3 Racing	(United States) Justin Jackson (United Kingdom) Tim Sugden	Porsche 911 GT3-RSR	M	153
10	GT	79	(United States) J-3 Racing	(United States) Justin Jackson (United Kingdom) Tim Sugden	Porsche 3.6L Flat-6	M	153
11	GT	31	(United States) White Lightning Racing	(United States) David Murry (United States) Craig Stanton	Porsche 911 GT3-RSR	M	152
11	GT	31	(United States) White Lightning Racing	(United States) David Murry (United States) Craig Stanton	Porsche 3.6L Flat-6	M	152
12	**LMP2**	**10**	**(United States) Miracle Motorsports**	**(United States) Ian James (United States) James Gue**	**Lola B2K/40**	Y	**151**
12	**LMP2**	**10**	**(United States) Miracle Motorsports**	**(United States) Ian James (United States) James Gue**	**Nissan (AER) VQL 3.0L V6**	Y	**151**
13	GT	66	(United States) New Century - The Racer's Group	(United States) Cort Wagner (United States) Patrick Long	Porsche 911 GT3-RSR	M	150
13	GT	66	(United States) New Century - The Racer's Group	(United States) Cort Wagner (United States) Patrick Long	Porsche 3.6L Flat-6	M	150
14	GTS	71	(United States) Carsport America	(United States) Tom Weickardt (France) Jean-Philippe Belloc	Dodge Viper GTS-R	P	149
14	GTS	71	(United States) Carsport America	(United States) Tom Weickardt (France) Jean-Philippe Belloc	Dodge 8.0L V10	P	149
15	GT	44	(United States) Flying Lizard Motorsports	(United States) Lonnie Pechnik (United States) Seth Neiman	Porsche 911 GT3-RSR	M	147
15	GT	44	(United States) Flying Lizard Motorsports	(United States) Lonnie Pechnik (United States) Seth Neiman	Porsche 3.6L Flat-6	M	147
16	GT	60	(United Kingdom) P.K. Sport	(United States) Hugh Plumb (United States) Peter Boss	Porsche 911 GT3-RS	P	147
16	GT	60	(United Kingdom) P.K. Sport	(United States) Hugh Plumb (United States) Peter Boss	Porsche 3.6L Flat-6	P	147
17	LMP2	13	(United States) Marshall Cooke Race Car Company	(United States) Andy Lally (United States) Ryan Eversley	Lola B2K/40	A	143
17	LMP2	13	(United States) Marshall Cooke Race Car Company	(United States) Andy Lally (United States) Ryan Eversley	Ford (Millington) 2.0L Turbo I4	A	143
18	GT	67	(United States) New Century - The Racer's Group	(United States) Jim Matthews (Germany) Pierre Ehret	Porsche 911 GT3-RSR	M	142
18	GT	67	(United States) New Century - The Racer's Group	(United States) Jim Matthews (Germany) Pierre Ehret	Porsche 3.6L Flat-6	M	142
19	GT	23	(United States) Alex Job Racing	(Germany) Jörg Bergmeister (Germany) Timo Bernhard	Porsche 911 GT3-RSR	M	139
19	GT	23	(United States) Alex Job Racing	(Germany) Jörg Bergmeister (Germany) Timo Bernhard	Porsche 3.6L Flat-6	M	139
20	GT	78	(United States) J-3 Racing	(Mexico) Randy Wars (Canada) Melanie Paterson	Porsche 911 GT3-RS	M	130
20	GT	78	(United States) J-3 Racing	(Mexico) Randy Wars (Canada) Melanie Paterson	Porsche 3.6L Flat-6	M	130
21 NC	GTS	5	(United States) Krohn-Barbour Racing	(Netherlands) Peter Kox (Australia) David Brabham	Lamborghini Murcielago R-GT	P	103
21 NC	GTS	5	(United States) Krohn-Barbour Racing	(Netherlands) Peter Kox (Australia) David Brabham	Lamborghini 6.0L V12	P	103
22 DNF	LMP2	56	(United States) Team Bucknum Racing	(United States) Jeff Bucknum (United States) Bryan Willman (United States) Chris McMurry	Pilbeam MP91	D	96
22 DNF	LMP2	56	(United States) Team Bucknum Racing	(United States) Jeff Bucknum (United States) Bryan Willman (United States) Chris McMurry	Nissan (AER) VQL 3.0L V6	D	96
23 DNF	LMP2	19	(United States) Van der Steur Racing	(United States) Gunnar van der Steur (United States) Eric van der Steur	Lola B2K/40	Y	88
23 DNF	LMP2	19	(United States) Van der Steur Racing	(United States) Gunnar van der Steur (United States) Eric van der Steur	Nissan (AER) VQL 3.0L V6	Y	88
24 DNF	LMP1	37	(United States) Intersport Racing	(United States) Duncan Dayton (United States) Jon Field	Lola B01/60	G	73
24 DNF	LMP1	37	(United States) Intersport Racing	(United States) Duncan Dayton (United States) Jon Field	Judd KV675 3.4L V8	G	73
25 DNF	LMP2	30	(United States) Intersport Racing	(United States) Clint Field (United States) Mike Durand	Lola B2K/40	P	55
25 DNF	LMP2	30	(United States) Intersport Racing	(United States) Clint Field (United States) Mike Durand	Judd KV675 3.4L V8	P	55
26 DNF	GT	50	(United States) Panoz Motor Sports	(United States) Gunnar Jeannette (United States) Kelly Collins	Panoz Esperante GT-LM	P	13
26 DNF	GT	50	(United States) Panoz Motor Sports	(United States) Gunnar Jeannette (United States) Kelly Collins	Ford (Élan) 5.0L V8	P	13
27 DNF	GT	43	(United States) BAM!	(Germany) Lucas Luhr (United States) Leo Hindery	Porsche 911 GT3-RSR	M	1
27 DNF	GT	43	(United States) BAM!	(Germany) Lucas Luhr (United States) Leo Hindery	Porsche 3.6L Flat-6	M	1

== Statistics ==
- Pole Position - #16 Dyson Racing - 47.962
- Fastest Lap - #16 Dyson Racing - 49.059
- Distance - 254.1 miles (408.9 km)
- Average Speed - 92.346 mph (148.616 km/h)

American Le Mans Series
Previous race: 2004 American Le Mans at Mid-Ohio	2004 season	Next race: 2004 Grand Prix of Sonoma
