= 2004 Road America 500 =

Track map of Road America.

The 2004 Road America 500 was the seventh race for the 2004 American Le Mans Series season. It took place on August 22, 2004.

== Official results ==
Class winners in bold. Cars failing to complete 70% of winner's distance marked as Not Classified (NC).

Pos	Class	No	Team	Drivers	Chassis	Tyre	Laps
Pos	Class	No	Team	Drivers	Engine	Tyre	Laps
1	**LMP1**	**38**	**(United States) ADT Champion Racing**	**(Germany) Marco Werner (Finland) JJ Lehto**	**Audi R8**	MI	**80**
1	**LMP1**	**38**	**(United States) ADT Champion Racing**	**(Germany) Marco Werner (Finland) JJ Lehto**	**Audi 3.6L Turbo V8**	MI	**80**
2	LMP1	37	(United States) Intersport Racing	(United States) Jon Field (United States) Duncan Dayton	Lola B01/60	G	79
2	LMP1	37	(United States) Intersport Racing	(United States) Jon Field (United States) Duncan Dayton	Judd KV675 3.4L V8	G	79
3	**GTS**	**4**	**(United States) Corvette Racing**	**(United Kingdom) Oliver Gavin (Monaco) Olivier Beretta**	**Chevrolet Corvette C5-R**	MI	**77**
3	**GTS**	**4**	**(United States) Corvette Racing**	**(United Kingdom) Oliver Gavin (Monaco) Olivier Beretta**	**Chevrolet 7.0L V8**	MI	**77**
4	GTS	3	(United States) Corvette Racing	(Canada) Ron Fellows (United States) Johnny O'Connell	Chevrolet Corvette C5-R	MI	77
4	GTS	3	(United States) Corvette Racing	(Canada) Ron Fellows (United States) Johnny O'Connell	Chevrolet 7.0L V8	MI	77
5	**LMP2**	**10**	**(United States) Miracle Motorsports**	**(United States) Ian James (United States) James Gue**	**Courage C65**	Y	**75**
5	**LMP2**	**10**	**(United States) Miracle Motorsports**	**(United States) Ian James (United States) James Gue**	**MG (AER) XP20 2.0L Turbo I4**	Y	**75**
6	GTS	63	(United States) ACEMCO Motorsports	(United States) Terry Borcheller (United Kingdom) Johnny Mowlem	Saleen S7-R	P	73
6	GTS	63	(United States) ACEMCO Motorsports	(United States) Terry Borcheller (United Kingdom) Johnny Mowlem	Ford 7.0L V8	P	73
7	**GT**	**23**	**(United States) Alex Job Racing**	**(Germany) Jörg Bergmeister (Germany) Timo Bernhard**	**Porsche 911 GT3-RSR**	MI	**73**
7	**GT**	**23**	**(United States) Alex Job Racing**	**(Germany) Jörg Bergmeister (Germany) Timo Bernhard**	**Porsche 3.6L Flat-6**	MI	**73**
8	GT	31	(United States) White Lightning Racing	(United States) David Murry (United States) Craig Stanton	Porsche 911 GT3-RSR	MI	73
8	GT	31	(United States) White Lightning Racing	(United States) David Murry (United States) Craig Stanton	Porsche 3.6L Flat-6	MI	73
9	GT	45	(United States) Flying Lizard Motorsports	(United States) Johannes van Overbeek (United States) Darren Law	Porsche 911 GT3-RSR	MI	73
9	GT	45	(United States) Flying Lizard Motorsports	(United States) Johannes van Overbeek (United States) Darren Law	Porsche 3.6L Flat-6	MI	73
10	GT	66	(United States) New Century - The Racer's Group	(United States) Patrick Long (United States) Cort Wagner	Porsche 911 GT3-RSR	MI	72
10	GT	66	(United States) New Century - The Racer's Group	(United States) Patrick Long (United States) Cort Wagner	Porsche 3.6L Flat-6	MI	72
11	GT	79	(United States) J-3 Racing	(United States) Justin Jackson (United Kingdom) Tim Sugden	Porsche 911 GT3-RSR	MI	72
11	GT	79	(United States) J-3 Racing	(United States) Justin Jackson (United Kingdom) Tim Sugden	Porsche 3.6L Flat-6	MI	72
12	GT	44	(United States) Flying Lizard Motorsports	(United States) Lonnie Pechnik (United States) Seth Neiman	Porsche 911 GT3-RSR	MI	71
12	GT	44	(United States) Flying Lizard Motorsports	(United States) Lonnie Pechnik (United States) Seth Neiman	Porsche 3.6L Flat-6	MI	71
13	GT	43	(United States) BAM!	(United States) Leo Hindery (Germany) Sascha Maassen	Porsche 911 GT3-RSR	MI	71
13	GT	43	(United States) BAM!	(United States) Leo Hindery (Germany) Sascha Maassen	Porsche 3.6L Flat-6	MI	71
14	GT	67	(United States) New Century - The Racer's Group	(United States) Philip Collin (Germany) Pierre Ehret	Porsche 911 GT3-RSR	MI	70
14	GT	67	(United States) New Century - The Racer's Group	(United States) Philip Collin (Germany) Pierre Ehret	Porsche 3.6L Flat-6	MI	70
15	GTS	71	(United States) Carsport America	(United States) Tom Weickardt (France) Jean-Philippe Belloc	Dodge Viper GTS-R	P	61
15	GTS	71	(United States) Carsport America	(United States) Tom Weickardt (France) Jean-Philippe Belloc	Dodge 8.0L V10	P	61
16	LMP2	11	(United States) Miracle Motorsports	(United States) John Macaluso (United States) Mike Borkowski	Lola B2K/40	Y	60
16	LMP2	11	(United States) Miracle Motorsports	(United States) John Macaluso (United States) Mike Borkowski	Nissan (AER) 3.0L V6	Y	60
17 DNF	GT	50	(United States) Panoz Motor Sports	(United States) Gunnar Jeannette (Belgium) David Saelens	Panoz Esperante GT-LM	P	51
17 DNF	GT	50	(United States) Panoz Motor Sports	(United States) Gunnar Jeannette (Belgium) David Saelens	Ford (Elan) 5.0L V8	P	51
18 DNF	GT	24	(United States) Alex Job Racing	(Germany) Marc Lieb (France) Romain Dumas	Porsche 911 GT3-RSR	MI	46
18 DNF	GT	24	(United States) Alex Job Racing	(Germany) Marc Lieb (France) Romain Dumas	Porsche 3.6L Flat-6	MI	46
19 DNF	LMP1	16	(United States) Dyson Racing	(United States) Butch Leitzinger (United Kingdom) James Weaver	MG-Lola EX257	G	30
19 DNF	LMP1	16	(United States) Dyson Racing	(United States) Butch Leitzinger (United Kingdom) James Weaver	MG (AER) XP20 2.0L Turbo I4	G	30
20 DNF	LMP1	20	(United States) Dyson Racing	(United States) Chris Dyson (United Kingdom) Andy Wallace	MG-Lola EX257	G	13
20 DNF	LMP1	20	(United States) Dyson Racing	(United States) Chris Dyson (United Kingdom) Andy Wallace	MG (AER) XP20 2.0L Turbo I4	G	13
21 DNF	LMP2	56	(United States) Team Bucknum Racing	(United States) Jeff Bucknum (United States) Chris McMurry (United States) Bryan Willman	Pilbeam MP91	D	11
21 DNF	LMP2	56	(United States) Team Bucknum Racing	(United States) Jeff Bucknum (United States) Chris McMurry (United States) Bryan Willman	Willman 3.4L V6	D	11
22 DSQ^{†}	LMP2	30	(United States) Intersport Racing	(United States) Clint Field (United Kingdom) Robin Liddell	Lola B2K/40	P	11
22 DSQ^{†}	LMP2	30	(United States) Intersport Racing	(United States) Clint Field (United Kingdom) Robin Liddell	Judd KV675 3.4L V8	P	11

† - #30 was disqualified for receiving outside assistance on the race course.

== Statistics ==
- Pole Position - #16 Dyson Racing - 1:51.893
- Fastest Lap - #38 ADT Champion Racing - 1:54.050
- Distance - 323.84 miles (521.17 km)
- Average Speed - 116.767 mph (187.918 km/h)

American Le Mans Series
Previous race: 2004 Grand Prix of Mosport	2004 season	Next race: 2004 Petit Le Mans
