= 2004 American Le Mans Series =

34th season of the racing series organized by IMSA

Seasons
- ← 2003 2005 →

The 2004 American Le Mans Series season was the 34th season for the IMSA GT Championship, and the sixth under the American Le Mans Series banner. It was a series for Le Mans Prototypes (LMP) and Grand Touring (GT) race cars divided into 4 classes: LMP1, LMP2, GTS, and GT. It began March 20, 2004 and ended October 16, 2004 after 9 races.

== Schedule ==
Rnd	Race	Length	Circuit	Location	Date
1	(United States) Mobil 1 12 Hours of Sebring	12 Hours	Sebring Raceway	Sebring, Florida	March 20
2	(United States) American Le Mans at Mid-Ohio	2 Hours 45 Minutes	Mid-Ohio	Lexington, Ohio	June 27
3	(United States) New England Grand Prix	2 Hours 45 Minutes	Lime Rock Park	Lakeville, Connecticut	July 5
4	(United States) Infineon Grand Prix of Sonoma	2 Hours 45 Minutes	Infineon Raceway	Sonoma, California	July 18
5	(United States) Portland Grand Prix	2 Hours 45 Minutes	Portland International Raceway	Portland, Oregon	July 25
6	(Canada) Toronto Grand Prix of Mosport	2 Hours 45 Minutes	Mosport	Bowmanville, Ontario	August 8
7	(United States) Road America 500	2 Hours 45 Minutes	Road America	Elkhart Lake, Wisconsin	August 22
8	(United States) Chevy presents Petit Le Mans	1000 Miles or 10 Hours	Road Atlanta	Braselton, Georgia	September 25
9	(United States) Audi Sports Car Championships	4 Hours	Mazda Raceway Laguna Seca	Monterey, California	October 16

=== Schedule changes ===
The ALMS held its first-ever event in the Northeastern United States with an Independence Day weekend event at Lime Rock Park. The series will also return to Portland for the first time since 2001, as well as return to Mid-Ohio, which was dropped after the 2002 season. Trois-Rivières was dropped after new Quebec anti-tobacco legislation made holding the race unfeasible. Mosport became the only race outside of the United States. Miami was also dropped from the calendar after the CART Series collapsed at the end of 2003. The Grand Prix of Atlanta was dropped as it was only introduced as a replacement for cancelled races. Laguna Seca would hold the season finale and had its distance increased to 4 hours.

== Entry list ==
=== Le Mans Prototype 1 (LMP1) ===
Team	Chassis	Engine	Tyre	No.	Drivers	Rnds.
(United States) Champion Racing	Audi R8	Audi 3.6 L Turbo V8	M	2	(United Kingdom) Johnny Herbert	8–9
(United States) Champion Racing	Audi R8	Audi 3.6 L Turbo V8	M	2	(Germany) Pierre Kaffer	8–9
(United States) Champion Racing	Audi R8	Audi 3.6 L Turbo V8	M	38	(Finland) J.J. Lehto	All
(United States) Champion Racing	Audi R8	Audi 3.6 L Turbo V8	M	38	(Germany) Marco Werner	All
(United States) Champion Racing	Audi R8	Audi 3.6 L Turbo V8	M	38	(Italy) Emanuele Pirro	1
(United States) Autocon Motorsports	Riley & Scott Mk III C	Lincoln (Élan) 5.0 L V8	D	12	(United States) Tomy Drissi	1, 8
(United States) Autocon Motorsports	Riley & Scott Mk III C	Lincoln (Élan) 5.0 L V8	D	12	(United States) Michael Lewis	1, 8
(United States) Autocon Motorsports	Riley & Scott Mk III C	Lincoln (Élan) 5.0 L V8	D	12	(United States) Vic Rice	1
(United States) Autocon Motorsports	Riley & Scott Mk III C	Lincoln (Élan) 5.0 L V8	D	12	(Canada) Melanie Paterson	8
(United Kingdom) Taurus Racing	Lola B2K/10	Judd GV4 4.0 L V10	D	15	(United Kingdom) Justin Wilson	1
(United Kingdom) Taurus Racing	Lola B2K/10	Judd GV4 4.0 L V10	D	15	(United Kingdom) Phil Andrews	1
(United Kingdom) Taurus Racing	Lola B2K/10	Judd GV4 4.0 L V10	D	15	(Venezuela) Milka Duno	1
(United States) Dyson Racing Team	MG-Lola EX257	MG (AER) XP20 2.0 L Turbo I4	G	16	(United Kingdom) James Weaver	All
(United States) Dyson Racing Team	MG-Lola EX257	MG (AER) XP20 2.0 L Turbo I4	G	16	(United States) Butch Leitzinger	All
(United States) Dyson Racing Team	MG-Lola EX257	MG (AER) XP20 2.0 L Turbo I4	G	16	(United Kingdom) Andy Wallace	1, 8
(United States) Dyson Racing Team	MG-Lola EX257	MG (AER) XP20 2.0 L Turbo I4	G	20	(United States) Chris Dyson	All
(United States) Dyson Racing Team	MG-Lola EX257	MG (AER) XP20 2.0 L Turbo I4	G	20	(Netherlands) Jan Lammers	1, 8
(United States) Dyson Racing Team	MG-Lola EX257	MG (AER) XP20 2.0 L Turbo I4	G	20	(Belgium) Didier de Radigues	1
(United States) Dyson Racing Team	MG-Lola EX257	MG (AER) XP20 2.0 L Turbo I4	G	20	(United Kingdom) Andy Wallace	2–7, 9
(United Kingdom) Rollcentre Racing	Dallara SP1	Judd GV4 4.0 L V10	D	22	(Portugal) Joăo Barbosa	1
(United Kingdom) Rollcentre Racing	Dallara SP1	Judd GV4 4.0 L V10	D	22	(United Kingdom) Rob Barff	1
(United Kingdom) Rollcentre Racing	Dallara SP1	Judd GV4 4.0 L V10	D	22	(United Kingdom) Martin Short	1
(United Kingdom) Creation Autosportif	DBA 03S	Zytek ZG348 3.4 L V8	D	27	(France) Nicolas Minassian	8–9
(United Kingdom) Creation Autosportif	DBA 03S	Zytek ZG348 3.4 L V8	D	27	(United Kingdom) Jamie Campbell-Walter	8–9
(United Kingdom) Audi Sport UK Team Veloqx	Audi R8	Audi 3.6 L Turbo V8	M	28	(United Kingdom) Allan McNish	1
(United Kingdom) Audi Sport UK Team Veloqx	Audi R8	Audi 3.6 L Turbo V8	M	28	(Germany) Frank Biela	1
(United Kingdom) Audi Sport UK Team Veloqx	Audi R8	Audi 3.6 L Turbo V8	M	28	(Germany) Pierre Kaffer	1
(United Kingdom) Audi Sport UK Team Veloqx	Audi R8	Audi 3.6 L Turbo V8	M	88	(United Kingdom) Johnny Herbert	1
(United Kingdom) Audi Sport UK Team Veloqx	Audi R8	Audi 3.6 L Turbo V8	M	88	(United Kingdom) Jamie Davies	1
(United Kingdom) Audi Sport UK Team Veloqx	Audi R8	Audi 3.6 L Turbo V8	M	88	(United Kingdom) Guy Smith	1
(United States) Intersport Racing	Riley & Scott Mk III C	Élan 6L8 6.0 L V8	G	33	(United States) Mike Durand	1
(United States) Intersport Racing	Riley & Scott Mk III C	Élan 6L8 6.0 L V8	G	33	(United States) Chad Block	1
(United States) Intersport Racing	Riley & Scott Mk III C	Élan 6L8 6.0 L V8	G	33	(France) Georges Forgeois	1
(United States) Intersport Racing	Lola B01/60	Judd KV675 3.4 L V8	G	37	(United States) Jon Field	1–4, 6–9
(United States) Intersport Racing	Lola B01/60	Judd KV675 3.4 L V8	G	37	(United States) Duncan Dayton	1–4, 7–9
(United States) Intersport Racing	Lola B01/60	Judd KV675 3.4 L V8	G	37	(United States) Larry Connor	1
(United States) Intersport Racing	Lola B01/60	Judd KV675 3.4 L V8	G	37	(Sweden) Niclas Jönsson	6
(United States) Intersport Racing	Lola B01/60	Judd KV675 3.4 L V8	G	37	(United States) Mike Durand	8
(United Kingdom) Team Elite	Lotus Elise GT1	Chevrolet LT5 6.0 L V8	D	50	(United States) Jay Cochran	1
(United Kingdom) Team Elite	Lotus Elise GT1	Chevrolet LT5 6.0 L V8	D	50	(United States) Ed Zabinski	1
(United Kingdom) Team Elite	Lotus Elise GT1	Chevrolet LT5 6.0 L V8	D	50	(Republic of Ireland) Damien Faulkner	1
(France) Larbre Compétition	Panoz GTP	Élan 6L8 6.0 L V8	M	86	(France) Christophe Bouchut	1
(France) Larbre Compétition	Panoz GTP	Élan 6L8 6.0 L V8	M	86	(France) Jean-Luc Blanchemain	1
(France) Larbre Compétition	Panoz GTP	Élan 6L8 6.0 L V8	M	86	(France) Roland Bervillé	1

=== Le Mans Prototype 2 (LMP2) ===
Team	Chassis	Engine	Tyre	No.	Drivers	Rnds.
(United States) Rand Racing	Lola B2K/40	Nissan (AER) VQL 3.0 L V6	Y	7	(United States) Bill Rand	1
(United States) Rand Racing	Lola B2K/40	Nissan (AER) VQL 3.0 L V6	Y	7	(United States) Mike Fitzgerald	1
(United States) Rand Racing	Lola B2K/40	Nissan (AER) VQL 3.0 L V6	Y	7	(United States) James Gue	1
(United States) Rand Racing	Lola B2K/40	Nissan (AER) VQL 3.0 L V6	Y	8	(United Kingdom) Marino Franchitti	1
(United States) Rand Racing	Lola B2K/40	Nissan (AER) VQL 3.0 L V6	Y	8	(United States) Derek Hill	1
(United States) Rand Racing	Lola B2K/40	Nissan (AER) VQL 3.0 L V6	Y	8	(United States) Andy Lally	1
(United States) Marshall Cooke Racing	Lola B2K/40	Ford (Millington) 2.0 L Turbo I4	P	7	(United States) Jason Workman	8
(United States) Marshall Cooke Racing	Lola B2K/40	Ford (Millington) 2.0 L Turbo I4	P	7	(United Kingdom) Ben Devlin	8
(United States) Marshall Cooke Racing	Lola B2K/40	Ford (Millington) 2.0 L Turbo I4	P	7	(United States) Rich Grupp	8
(United States) Marshall Cooke Racing	Lola B2K/40	Ford (Millington) 2.0 L Turbo I4	P	13	(United States) Andy Lally	8
(United States) Marshall Cooke Racing	Lola B2K/40	Ford (Millington) 2.0 L Turbo I4	P	13	(United States) Spencer Pumpelly	8
(United States) Marshall Cooke Racing	Lola B2K/40	Ford (Millington) 2.0 L Turbo I4	P	13	(United States) Ryan Eversley	8
(United States) American Spirit Racing (United States) Miracle Motorsports	Lola B2K/40 (1–6) Courage C65 (7–9)	Nissan (AER) VQL 3.0 L V6 (1–6) MG (AER) XP20 2.0 L Turbo I4 (7–9)	PY	10	(United Kingdom) Ian James	All
(United States) American Spirit Racing (United States) Miracle Motorsports	Lola B2K/40 (1–6) Courage C65 (7–9)	Nissan (AER) VQL 3.0 L V6 (1–6) MG (AER) XP20 2.0 L Turbo I4 (7–9)	PY	10	(United States) John Macaluso	1, 5–6, 8–9
(United States) American Spirit Racing (United States) Miracle Motorsports	Lola B2K/40 (1–6) Courage C65 (7–9)	Nissan (AER) VQL 3.0 L V6 (1–6) MG (AER) XP20 2.0 L Turbo I4 (7–9)	PY	10	(United States) Mike Borkowski	1
(United States) American Spirit Racing (United States) Miracle Motorsports	Lola B2K/40 (1–6) Courage C65 (7–9)	Nissan (AER) VQL 3.0 L V6 (1–6) MG (AER) XP20 2.0 L Turbo I4 (7–9)	PY	10	(United States) James Gue	2–9
(United States) American Spirit Racing (United States) Miracle Motorsports	Lola B2K/40	Nissan (AER) VQL 3.0 L V6	PY	11	(United States) Jason Workman	1
(United States) American Spirit Racing (United States) Miracle Motorsports	Lola B2K/40	Nissan (AER) VQL 3.0 L V6	PY	11	(United States) Scott Bradley	1
(United States) American Spirit Racing (United States) Miracle Motorsports	Lola B2K/40	Nissan (AER) VQL 3.0 L V6	PY	11	(United States) Bobby Sak	1
(United States) American Spirit Racing (United States) Miracle Motorsports	Lola B2K/40	Nissan (AER) VQL 3.0 L V6	PY	11	(United States) John Macaluso	7
(United States) American Spirit Racing (United States) Miracle Motorsports	Lola B2K/40	Nissan (AER) VQL 3.0 L V6	PY	11	(United States) Mike Borkowski	7
(United States) American Spirit Racing (United States) Miracle Motorsports	Lola B2K/40	Nissan (AER) VQL 3.0 L V6	PY	56	(United States) Jeff Bucknum	8–9
(United States) American Spirit Racing (United States) Miracle Motorsports	Lola B2K/40	Nissan (AER) VQL 3.0 L V6	PY	56	(United States) Chris McMurry	8–9
(United States) American Spirit Racing (United States) Miracle Motorsports	Lola B2K/40	Nissan (AER) VQL 3.0 L V6	PY	56	(United States) Bryan Willman	8–9
(United States) Race Car Company	Lola B2K/40	Ford (Millington) 2.0 L Turbo I4	A	13	(United States) Andy Lally	2–3
(United States) Race Car Company	Lola B2K/40	Ford (Millington) 2.0 L Turbo I4	A	13	(United States) Ryan Eversley	2–3
(United States) Van der Steur Racing	Lola B2K/40	Nissan (AER) VQL 3.0 L V6	Y	19	(United States) Gunnar van der Steur	1–3, 8–9
(United States) Van der Steur Racing	Lola B2K/40	Nissan (AER) VQL 3.0 L V6	Y	19	(United States) Erik van der Steur	1–3, 8–9
(United States) Van der Steur Racing	Lola B2K/40	Nissan (AER) VQL 3.0 L V6	Y	19	(United States) Spencer Pumpelly	1*
(United States) Van der Steur Racing	Lola B2K/40	Nissan (AER) VQL 3.0 L V6	Y	19	(United Kingdom) Ben Devlin	8–9
(United States) Intersport Racing	Lola B2K/40	Judd KV675 3.4 L V8	P	30	(United States) Clint Field	All
(United States) Intersport Racing	Lola B2K/40	Judd KV675 3.4 L V8	P	30	(United States) Rick Sutherland	1, 9
(United States) Intersport Racing	Lola B2K/40	Judd KV675 3.4 L V8	P	30	(United Kingdom) William Binnie	1
(United States) Intersport Racing	Lola B2K/40	Judd KV675 3.4 L V8	P	30	(United Kingdom) Robin Liddell	2, 4–9
(United States) Intersport Racing	Lola B2K/40	Judd KV675 3.4 L V8	P	30	(United States) Mike Durand	3
(United States) Intersport Racing	Lola B2K/40	Judd KV675 3.4 L V8	P	30	(United States) Jon Field	4–5
(United States) Intersport Racing	Lola B2K/40	Judd KV675 3.4 L V8	P	30	(Venezuela) Milka Duno	8
(United States) Team Bucknum Racing	Pilbeam MP91	Willman (JPX) 3.4 L V6	D	56	(United States) Jeff Bucknum	1–7
(United States) Team Bucknum Racing	Pilbeam MP91	Willman (JPX) 3.4 L V6	D	56	(United States) Chris McMurry	1–7
(United States) Team Bucknum Racing	Pilbeam MP91	Willman (JPX) 3.4 L V6	D	56	(United States) Bryan Willman	1–7

=== Grand Touring Sport (GTS) ===
Team	Chassis	Engine	Tyre	No.	Drivers	Rnds.
(United States) Corvette Racing	Chevrolet Corvette C5-R	Chevrolet LS1 7.0L V8	M	3	(Canada) Ron Fellows	All
(United States) Corvette Racing	Chevrolet Corvette C5-R	Chevrolet LS1 7.0L V8	M	3	(United States) Johnny O'Connell	All
(United States) Corvette Racing	Chevrolet Corvette C5-R	Chevrolet LS1 7.0L V8	M	3	(Italy) Max Papis	1, 8
(United States) Corvette Racing	Chevrolet Corvette C5-R	Chevrolet LS1 7.0L V8	M	4	(United Kingdom) Oliver Gavin	All
(United States) Corvette Racing	Chevrolet Corvette C5-R	Chevrolet LS1 7.0L V8	M	4	(Monaco) Olivier Beretta	All
(United States) Corvette Racing	Chevrolet Corvette C5-R	Chevrolet LS1 7.0L V8	M	4	(Denmark) Jan Magnussen	1, 8
(United States) Corvette Racing	Chevrolet Corvette C5-R	Chevrolet LS1 7.0L V8	M	8	(United States) Boris Said	4
(United States) Corvette Racing	Chevrolet Corvette C5-R	Chevrolet LS1 7.0L V8	M	8	(United States) Dale Earnhardt Jr.	4
(United States) Krohn-Barbour Racing	Lamborghini Murciélago R-GT	Lamborghini L535 6.0 L V12	P	5	(Netherlands) Peter Kox	2–6, 8
(United States) Krohn-Barbour Racing	Lamborghini Murciélago R-GT	Lamborghini L535 6.0 L V12	P	5	(Australia) David Brabham	2–6, 8
(United States) Krohn-Barbour Racing	Lamborghini Murciélago R-GT	Lamborghini L535 6.0 L V12	P	5	(Sweden) Niclas Jönsson	8
(United States) Krohn-Barbour Racing	Lamborghini Murciélago R-GT	Lamborghini L535 6.0 L V12	P	6	(United States) Tracy Krohn	2–6, 8
(United States) Krohn-Barbour Racing	Lamborghini Murciélago R-GT	Lamborghini L535 6.0 L V12	P	6	(Canada) Scott Maxwell	2–3, 6, 8
(United States) Krohn-Barbour Racing	Lamborghini Murciélago R-GT	Lamborghini L535 6.0 L V12	P	6	(United States) David McEntee	4
(United States) Krohn-Barbour Racing	Lamborghini Murciélago R-GT	Lamborghini L535 6.0 L V12	P	6	(Sweden) Niclas Jönsson	5
(United States) Krohn-Barbour Racing	Lamborghini Murciélago R-GT	Lamborghini L535 6.0 L V12	P	6	(United States) Joe Fox	8
(Netherlands) Barron Connor Racing	Ferrari 575-GTC Maranello	Ferrari F133 GT 6.0 L V12	P	25	(United States) Danny Sullivan	1
(Netherlands) Barron Connor Racing	Ferrari 575-GTC Maranello	Ferrari F133 GT 6.0 L V12	P	25	(Netherlands) John Bosch	1
(Netherlands) Barron Connor Racing	Ferrari 575-GTC Maranello	Ferrari F133 GT 6.0 L V12	P	25	(Italy) Thomas Biagi	1
(Netherlands) Barron Connor Racing	Ferrari 575-GTC Maranello	Ferrari F133 GT 6.0 L V12	P	26	(Netherlands) Mike Hezemans	1
(Netherlands) Barron Connor Racing	Ferrari 575-GTC Maranello	Ferrari F133 GT 6.0 L V12	P	26	(Switzerland) Jean-Denis Delétraz	1
(Netherlands) Barron Connor Racing	Ferrari 575-GTC Maranello	Ferrari F133 GT 6.0 L V12	P	26	(France) Ange Barde	1
(United States) ACEMCO Motorsports	Saleen S7-R	Ford Windsor 7.0 L V8	P	63	(United States) Terry Borcheller	All
(United States) ACEMCO Motorsports	Saleen S7-R	Ford Windsor 7.0 L V8	P	63	(United Kingdom) Johnny Mowlem	All
(United States) ACEMCO Motorsports	Saleen S7-R	Ford Windsor 7.0 L V8	P	63	(Australia) David Brabham	1
(United States) ACEMCO Motorsports	Saleen S7-R	Ford Windsor 7.0 L V8	P	63	(Portugal) Joăo Barbosa	8
(United States) Carsport America	Dodge Viper GTS-R	Dodge EWB 8.0 L V10	P	71	(France) Jean-Philippe Belloc	All
(United States) Carsport America	Dodge Viper GTS-R	Dodge EWB 8.0 L V10	P	71	(United States) Tom Weickardt	All
(United States) Carsport America	Dodge Viper GTS-R	Dodge EWB 8.0 L V10	P	71	(United States) Kevin Allen	1
(United States) Carsport America	Dodge Viper GTS-R	Dodge EWB 8.0 L V10	P	71	(Italy) Fabio Babini	8

=== Grand Touring (GT) ===
Team	Chassis	Engine	Tyre	No.	Drivers	Rnds.
(United States) Foxhill Racing (United States) Comprent Motor Sports	Porsche 996 GT3-RS	Porsche M96/77 3.6 L Flat-6	D	8	(United States) Andrew Davis	8
(United States) Foxhill Racing (United States) Comprent Motor Sports	Porsche 996 GT3-RS	Porsche M96/77 3.6 L Flat-6	D	8	(United States) Michael Cawley	8
(United States) Foxhill Racing (United States) Comprent Motor Sports	Porsche 996 GT3-RS	Porsche M96/77 3.6 L Flat-6	D	8	(United States) Charles Espenlaub	8
(United States) Alex Job Racing	Porsche 996 GT3-RSR	Porsche M96/77 3.6 L Flat-6	M	23	(Germany) Timo Bernhard	All
(United States) Alex Job Racing	Porsche 996 GT3-RSR	Porsche M96/77 3.6 L Flat-6	M	23	(Germany) Jörg Bergmeister	All
(United States) Alex Job Racing	Porsche 996 GT3-RSR	Porsche M96/77 3.6 L Flat-6	M	23	(Germany) Sascha Maassen	1, 8
(United States) Alex Job Racing	Porsche 996 GT3-RSR	Porsche M96/77 3.6 L Flat-6	M	24	(France) Romain Dumas	All
(United States) Alex Job Racing	Porsche 996 GT3-RSR	Porsche M96/77 3.6 L Flat-6	M	24	(Germany) Marc Lieb	All
(United States) Alex Job Racing	Porsche 996 GT3-RSR	Porsche M96/77 3.6 L Flat-6	M	24	(Germany) Lucas Lühr	1
(United States) Alex Job Racing	Porsche 996 GT3-RSR	Porsche M96/77 3.6 L Flat-6	M	24	(Germany) Wolf Henzler	8
(United States) White Lightning Racing	Porsche 996 GT3-RS (1) Porsche 996 GT3-RSR (2–9)	Porsche M96/77 3.6 L Flat-6	M	31	(United States) David Murry	All
(United States) White Lightning Racing	Porsche 996 GT3-RS (1) Porsche 996 GT3-RSR (2–9)	Porsche M96/77 3.6 L Flat-6	M	31	(United States) Craig Stanton	All
(United Kingdom) Cirtek Motorsport	Porsche 996 GT3-RSR	Porsche M96/77 3.6 L Flat-6	D	32/92	(New Zealand) Rob Wilson	1, 8
(United Kingdom) Cirtek Motorsport	Porsche 996 GT3-RSR	Porsche M96/77 3.6 L Flat-6	D	32/92	(United Kingdom) Frank Mountain	1, 8
(United Kingdom) Cirtek Motorsport	Porsche 996 GT3-RSR	Porsche M96/77 3.6 L Flat-6	D	32/92	(United Kingdom) Robert Brooks	1
(United Kingdom) Cirtek Motorsport	Porsche 996 GT3-RSR	Porsche M96/77 3.6 L Flat-6	D	32/92	(Italy) Andrea Montermini	8
(United Kingdom) Cirtek Motorsport	Ferrari 360 Modena GTC	Ferrari F131 3.6 L V8	D	92	(France) Christophe Bouchut	8
(United Kingdom) Cirtek Motorsport	Ferrari 360 Modena GTC	Ferrari F131 3.6 L V8	D	92	(Monaco) Stéphane Ortelli	8
(United States) Risi Competizione	Ferrari 360 Modena GTC	Ferrari F131 3.6 L V8	P	35	(Germany) Ralf Kelleners	1–6, 8–9
(United States) Risi Competizione	Ferrari 360 Modena GTC	Ferrari F131 3.6 L V8	P	35	(United States) Anthony Lazzaro	1–6, 8–9
(United States) Risi Competizione	Ferrari 360 Modena GTC	Ferrari F131 3.6 L V8	P	35	(Italy) Matteo Bobbi	1
(United States) Risi Competizione	Ferrari 360 Modena GTC	Ferrari F131 3.6 L V8	P	35	(Italy) Fabrizio de Simone	8
(United States) BAM! British American Motorsport	Porsche 996 GT3-RS (1) Porsche 996 GT3-RSR (2–9)	Porsche M96/77 3.6 L Flat-6	M	43	(United States) Leo Hindery	All
(United States) BAM! British American Motorsport	Porsche 996 GT3-RS (1) Porsche 996 GT3-RSR (2–9)	Porsche M96/77 3.6 L Flat-6	M	43	(United States) Peter Baron	1–2
(United States) BAM! British American Motorsport	Porsche 996 GT3-RS (1) Porsche 996 GT3-RSR (2–9)	Porsche M96/77 3.6 L Flat-6	M	43	(Germany) Mike Rockenfeller	1
(United States) BAM! British American Motorsport	Porsche 996 GT3-RS (1) Porsche 996 GT3-RSR (2–9)	Porsche M96/77 3.6 L Flat-6	M	43	(Germany) Lucas Lühr	3–5, 8–9
(United States) BAM! British American Motorsport	Porsche 996 GT3-RS (1) Porsche 996 GT3-RSR (2–9)	Porsche M96/77 3.6 L Flat-6	M	43	(Germany) Sascha Maassen	6–7, 9
(United States) BAM! British American Motorsport	Porsche 996 GT3-RS (1) Porsche 996 GT3-RSR (2–9)	Porsche M96/77 3.6 L Flat-6	M	43	(United Kingdom) Adam Jones	8
(United States) Flying Lizard Motorsports	Porsche 996 GT3-RS (1–2) Porsche 996 GT3-RSR (3–9)	Porsche M96/77 3.6 L Flat-6	M	44	(United States) Lonnie Pechnik	All
(United States) Flying Lizard Motorsports	Porsche 996 GT3-RS (1–2) Porsche 996 GT3-RSR (3–9)	Porsche M96/77 3.6 L Flat-6	M	44	(United States) Seth Neiman	All
(United States) Flying Lizard Motorsports	Porsche 996 GT3-RS (1–2) Porsche 996 GT3-RSR (3–9)	Porsche M96/77 3.6 L Flat-6	M	44	(United States) Peter Cunningham	1
(United States) Flying Lizard Motorsports	Porsche 996 GT3-RS (1–2) Porsche 996 GT3-RSR (3–9)	Porsche M96/77 3.6 L Flat-6	M	44	(United States) Jon Fogarty	8
(United States) Flying Lizard Motorsports	Porsche 996 GT3-RSR	Porsche M96/77 3.6 L Flat-6	M	45	(United States) Johannes van Overbeek	All
(United States) Flying Lizard Motorsports	Porsche 996 GT3-RSR	Porsche M96/77 3.6 L Flat-6	M	45	(United States) Darren Law	All
(United States) Flying Lizard Motorsports	Porsche 996 GT3-RSR	Porsche M96/77 3.6 L Flat-6	M	45	(United States) Jon Fogarty	1
(United States) Flying Lizard Motorsports	Porsche 996 GT3-RSR	Porsche M96/77 3.6 L Flat-6	M	45	(Netherlands) Patrick Huisman	8
(United Kingdom) Morgan Works Racing Team	Morgan Aero 8-R	BMW (Mader) M62TUB44 4.5 L V8	Y	49	(New Zealand) Neil Cunningham	1
(United Kingdom) Morgan Works Racing Team	Morgan Aero 8-R	BMW (Mader) M62TUB44 4.5 L V8	Y	49	(United Kingdom) Keith Ahlers	1
(United Kingdom) Morgan Works Racing Team	Morgan Aero 8-R	BMW (Mader) M62TUB44 4.5 L V8	Y	49	(United Kingdom) Adam Sharpe	1
(United States) Panoz Motor Sports	Panoz Esperante GT-LM	Ford (Elan) Cammer 5.0 L V8	P	50	(United States) Gunnar Jeannette	2–9
(United States) Panoz Motor Sports	Panoz Esperante GT-LM	Ford (Elan) Cammer 5.0 L V8	P	50	(Belgium) David Saelens	2, 4, 6–7
(United States) Panoz Motor Sports	Panoz Esperante GT-LM	Ford (Elan) Cammer 5.0 L V8	P	50	(United States) Kelly Collins	3, 5
(United States) Panoz Motor Sports	Panoz Esperante GT-LM	Ford (Elan) Cammer 5.0 L V8	P	50	(United Kingdom) Marino Franchitti	8–9
(United States) Panoz Motor Sports	Panoz Esperante GT-LM	Ford (Elan) Cammer 5.0 L V8	P	50	(France) Christophe Tinseau	8
(Germany) Seikel Motorsport	Porsche 996 GT3-RS	Porsche M96/77 3.6 L Flat-6	Y	52	(Canada) Tony Burgess	1, 8*
(Germany) Seikel Motorsport	Porsche 996 GT3-RS	Porsche M96/77 3.6 L Flat-6	Y	52	(United States) Grady Willingham	1, 8*
(Germany) Seikel Motorsport	Porsche 996 GT3-RS	Porsche M96/77 3.6 L Flat-6	Y	52	(United States) Philip Collin	1
(United Kingdom) P.K. Sport	Porsche 996 GT3-RS	Porsche M96/77 3.6 L Flat-6	P	60	(United States) Hugh Plumb	1–5
(United Kingdom) P.K. Sport	Porsche 996 GT3-RS	Porsche M96/77 3.6 L Flat-6	P	60	(United States) Peter Boss	1–5
(United Kingdom) P.K. Sport	Porsche 996 GT3-RS	Porsche M96/77 3.6 L Flat-6	P	60	(United Kingdom) Robin Liddell	1
(United Kingdom) P.K. Sport	Porsche 996 GT3-RS	Porsche M96/77 3.6 L Flat-6	P	60	(United Kingdom) Piers Masarati	6, 8–9
(United Kingdom) P.K. Sport	Porsche 996 GT3-RS	Porsche M96/77 3.6 L Flat-6	P	60	(Canada) Tony Burgess	6
(United Kingdom) P.K. Sport	Porsche 996 GT3-RS	Porsche M96/77 3.6 L Flat-6	P	60	(United States) Liz Halliday	8–9
(United Kingdom) P.K. Sport	Porsche 996 GT3-RS	Porsche M96/77 3.6 L Flat-6	P	60	(United Kingdom) Ian Donaldson	8
(United Kingdom) P.K. Sport	Porsche 996 GT3-RS	Porsche M96/77 3.6 L Flat-6	P	61	(Italy) Alex Caffi	1
(United Kingdom) P.K. Sport	Porsche 996 GT3-RS	Porsche M96/77 3.6 L Flat-6	P	61	(United Kingdom) David Warnock	1
(United Kingdom) P.K. Sport	Porsche 996 GT3-RS	Porsche M96/77 3.6 L Flat-6	P	61	(United States) Tracy Krohn	1
(United States) New Century/The Racer's Group	Porsche 996 GT3-RSR	Porsche M96/77 3.6 L Flat-6	M	66	(United States) Patrick Long	All
(United States) New Century/The Racer's Group	Porsche 996 GT3-RSR	Porsche M96/77 3.6 L Flat-6	M	66	(United States) Cort Wagner	All
(United States) New Century/The Racer's Group	Porsche 996 GT3-RSR	Porsche M96/77 3.6 L Flat-6	M	66	(United States) Kelly Collins	1
(United States) New Century/The Racer's Group	Porsche 996 GT3-RSR	Porsche M96/77 3.6 L Flat-6	M	66	(Germany) Mike Rockenfeller	8
(United States) New Century/The Racer's Group	Porsche 996 GT3-RSR	Porsche M96/77 3.6 L Flat-6	M	67	(Germany) Pierre Ehret	1–5, 7–9
(United States) New Century/The Racer's Group	Porsche 996 GT3-RSR	Porsche M96/77 3.6 L Flat-6	M	67	(United States) Jim Matthews	1–5, 7–9
(United States) New Century/The Racer's Group	Porsche 996 GT3-RSR	Porsche M96/77 3.6 L Flat-6	M	67	(United States) Marc Bunting	1
(United States) New Century/The Racer's Group	Porsche 996 GT3-RSR	Porsche M96/77 3.6 L Flat-6	M	67	(United States) Philip Collin	7–8
(United States) New Century/The Racer's Group	Porsche 996 GT3-RSR	Porsche M96/77 3.6 L Flat-6	M	67	(United Kingdom) Robert Nearn	8
(United States) New Century/The Racer's Group	Porsche 996 GT3-RSR	Porsche M96/77 3.6 L Flat-6	M	67	(Canada) Robert Julien	9
(United States) New Century/The Racer's Group	Porsche 996 GT3-RS	Porsche M96/77 3.6 L Flat-6	M	68	(United Kingdom) Piers Masarati	1
(United States) New Century/The Racer's Group	Porsche 996 GT3-RS	Porsche M96/77 3.6 L Flat-6	M	68	(United Kingdom) Gregor Fisken	1
(United States) New Century/The Racer's Group	Porsche 996 GT3-RS	Porsche M96/77 3.6 L Flat-6	M	68	(United Kingdom) Ian Donaldson	1
(United States) J-3 Racing	Porsche 996 GT3-RS	Porsche M96/77 3.6 L Flat-6	M	78	(United States) Romeo Kapudija	1
(United States) J-3 Racing	Porsche 996 GT3-RS	Porsche M96/77 3.6 L Flat-6	M	78	(Sweden) Niclas Jönsson	1
(United States) J-3 Racing	Porsche 996 GT3-RS	Porsche M96/77 3.6 L Flat-6	M	78	(United States) Dorsey Porter, Jr.	1
(United States) J-3 Racing	Porsche 996 GT3-RS	Porsche M96/77 3.6 L Flat-6	M	78	(Mexico) Randy Wars	3, 8
(United States) J-3 Racing	Porsche 996 GT3-RS	Porsche M96/77 3.6 L Flat-6	M	78	(Canada) Melanie Paterson	3
(United States) J-3 Racing	Porsche 996 GT3-RS	Porsche M96/77 3.6 L Flat-6	M	78	(Puerto Rico) Manuel Matos	8
(United States) J-3 Racing	Porsche 996 GT3-RS	Porsche M96/77 3.6 L Flat-6	M	78	(United States) Rick Skelton	8
(United States) J-3 Racing	Porsche 996 GT3-RSR	Porsche M96/77 3.6 L Flat-6	M	79	(United States) Justin Jackson	All
(United States) J-3 Racing	Porsche 996 GT3-RSR	Porsche M96/77 3.6 L Flat-6	M	79	(United Kingdom) Tim Sugden	All
(United States) J-3 Racing	Porsche 996 GT3-RSR	Porsche M96/77 3.6 L Flat-6	M	79	(United States) Brian Cunningham	1
(United States) J-3 Racing	Porsche 996 GT3-RSR	Porsche M96/77 3.6 L Flat-6	M	79	(France) Xavier Pompidou	8
(United Kingdom) Chamberlain-Synergy Motorsport	TVR Tuscan T400R	TVR Speed Six 4.0 L I6	D	91	(United Kingdom) Christopher Stockton	1
(United Kingdom) Chamberlain-Synergy Motorsport	TVR Tuscan T400R	TVR Speed Six 4.0 L I6	D	91	(United Kingdom) Gareth Evans	1
(United Kingdom) Chamberlain-Synergy Motorsport	TVR Tuscan T400R	TVR Speed Six 4.0 L I6	D	91	(United Kingdom) Amanda Stretton	1
(United Kingdom) Chamberlain-Synergy Motorsport	TVR Tuscan T400R	TVR Speed Six 4.0 L I6	D	92	(United Kingdom) Bob Berridge	1
(United Kingdom) Chamberlain-Synergy Motorsport	TVR Tuscan T400R	TVR Speed Six 4.0 L I6	D	92	(United Kingdom) Lee Caroline	1
(United Kingdom) Chamberlain-Synergy Motorsport	TVR Tuscan T400R	TVR Speed Six 4.0 L I6	D	92	(United Kingdom) Michael Caine	1

* Was on the entry list but did not participate in the event.

== Season results ==
Overall winner in bold.

Rnd	Circuit	LMP1 Winning Team	LMP2 Winning Team	GTS Winning Team	GT Winning Team	Results
Rnd	Circuit	LMP1 Winning Drivers	LMP2 Winning Drivers	GTS Winning Drivers	GT Winning Drivers	Results
1	Sebring	**(United Kingdom) #28 Audi Sport UK Veloqx**	(United States) #10 American Spirit Racing	(United States) #3 Corvette Racing	(United States) #23 Alex Job Racing	Results
1	Sebring	**(United Kingdom) Allan McNish** **(Germany) Frank Biela** **(Germany) Pierre Kaffer**	(United Kingdom) Ian James (United States) Mike Borkowski (United States) John Macaluso	(Canada) Ron Fellows (United States) Johnny O'Connell (Italy) Max Papis	(Germany) Timo Bernhard (Germany) Sascha Maassen	Results
2	Mid-Ohio	**(United States) #38 ADT Champion Racing**	(United States) #30 Intersport Racing	(United States) #3 Corvette Racing	(United States) #45 Flying Lizard Motorsports	Results
2	Mid-Ohio	**(Germany) Marco Werner** **(Finland) JJ Lehto**	(United States) Clint Field (United Kingdom) Robin Liddell	(Canada) Ron Fellows (United States) Johnny O'Connell	(United States) Darren Law (United States) Johannes van Overbeek	Results
3	Lime Rock	**(United States) #38 ADT Champion Racing**	(United States) #10 Miracle Motorsports	(United States) #4 Corvette Racing	(United States) #35 Risi Competizione	Results
3	Lime Rock	**(Germany) Marco Werner** **(Finland) JJ Lehto**	(United Kingdom) Ian James (United States) James Gue	(United Kingdom) Oliver Gavin (Monaco) Olivier Beretta	(Germany) Ralf Kelleners (United States) Anthony Lazzaro	Results
4	Infineon	**(United States) #38 ADT Champion Racing**	(United States) #30 Intersport Racing	(United States) #3 Corvette Racing	(United States) #23 Alex Job Racing	Results
4	Infineon	**(Germany) Marco Werner** **(Finland) JJ Lehto**	(United States) Jon Field (United States) Clint Field (United Kingdom) Robin Liddell	(Canada) Ron Fellows (United States) Johnny O'Connell	(Germany) Timo Bernhard (Germany) Jörg Bergmeister	Results
5	Portland	**(United States) #38 ADT Champion Racing**	(United States) #30 Intersport Racing	(United States) #3 Corvette Racing	(United States) #24 Alex Job Racing	Results
5	Portland	**(Germany) Marco Werner** **(Finland) JJ Lehto**	(United States) Jon Field (United States) Clint Field (United Kingdom) Robin Liddell	(Canada) Ron Fellows (United States) Johnny O'Connell	(France) Romain Dumas (Germany) Marc Lieb	Results
6	Mosport	**(United States) #16 Dyson Racing**	(United States) #30 Intersport Racing	(United States) #4 Corvette Racing	(United States) #23 Alex Job Racing	Results
6	Mosport	**(United States) Butch Leitzinger** **(United Kingdom) James Weaver**	(United States) Clint Field (United Kingdom) Robin Liddell	(United Kingdom) Oliver Gavin (Monaco) Olivier Beretta	(Germany) Jörg Bergmeister (Germany) Timo Bernhard	Results
7	Road America	**(United States) #38 ADT Champion Racing**	(United States) #10 Miracle Motorsports	(United States) #4 Corvette Racing	(United States) #23 Alex Job Racing	Results
7	Road America	**(Germany) Marco Werner** **(Finland) JJ Lehto**	(United Kingdom) Ian James (United States) James Gue	(United Kingdom) Oliver Gavin (Monaco) Olivier Beretta	(Germany) Jörg Bergmeister (Germany) Timo Bernhard	Results
8	Road Atlanta	**(United States) #38 ADT Champion Racing**	(United States) #30 Intersport Racing	(United States) #4 Corvette Racing	(United States) #23 Alex Job Racing	Results
8	Road Atlanta	**(Germany) Marco Werner** **(Finland) JJ Lehto**	(United States) Clint Field (United Kingdom) Robin Liddell (Venezuela) Milka Duno	(United Kingdom) Oliver Gavin (Monaco) Olivier Beretta (Denmark) Jan Magnussen	(Germany) Jörg Bergmeister (Germany) Timo Bernhard (Germany) Sascha Maassen	Results
9	Laguna Seca	**(United States) #2 ADT Champion Racing**	(United States) #30 Intersport Racing	(United States) #3 Corvette Racing	(United States) #24 Alex Job Racing	Results
9	Laguna Seca	**(United Kingdom) Johnny Herbert** **(Germany) Pierre Kaffer**	(United States) Clint Field (United States) Rick Sutherland (United Kingdom) Robin Liddell	(Canada) Ron Fellows (United States) Johnny O'Connell	(Germany) Marc Lieb (France) Romain Dumas	Results

== Championship results ==
Points are awarded to the top 10 finishers in the following order:

- 20-16-13-10-8-6-4-3-2-1

Exceptions were for the 4 Hour Monterey Sports Car Championships was scored in the following order:

- 23-19-16-13-11-9-7-6-5-4

And for the 12 Hours of Sebring and Petit Le Mans which award the top 10 finishers in the following order:

- 26-22-19-16-14-12-10-9-8-7

Cars failing to complete 70% of the winner's distance are not awarded points. Teams only score the points of their highest finishing entry in each race.

=== LMP1 Drivers' Championship ===
Pos.	Driver	Team	SEB (United States)	MOH (United States)	LIM (United States)	SON (United States)	POR (United States)	MOS (Canada)	ROA (United States)	ATL (United States)	LAG (United States)	Pts.
1	(Germany) Marco Werner	(United States) Champion Racing	2	1	1	1	1	2	1	1	2	183
1	(Finland) J.J. Lehto	(United States) Champion Racing	2	1	1	1	1	2	1	1	2	183
2	(United Kingdom) James Weaver	(United States) Dyson Racing Team	5	Ret	2	3	2	1	Ret	4	3	111
2	(United States) Butch Leitzinger	(United States) Dyson Racing Team	5	Ret	2	3	2	1	Ret	4	3	111
3	(United Kingdom) Andy Wallace	(United States) Dyson Racing Team	5	2	3	2	3	3	Ret	4	Ret	101
4	(United States) Chris Dyson	(United States) Dyson Racing Team	Ret	2	3	2	3	3	Ret	3	Ret	90
5	(Germany) Pierre Kaffer	(United Kingdom) Audi Sport UK	1									71
5	(Germany) Pierre Kaffer	(United States) Champion Racing								2	1	71
6	(United Kingdom) Johnny Herbert	(United Kingdom) Audi Sport UK	3									64
6	(United Kingdom) Johnny Herbert	(United States) Champion Racing								2	1	64
7	(Germany) Frank Biela	(United Kingdom) Audi Sport UK	1									26
7	(United Kingdom) Allan McNish	(United Kingdom) Audi Sport UK	1									26
8	(United States) Jon Field	(United States) Intersport Racing	8	NC	Ret	DNS	DNP	Ret	2	Ret	Ret	25
8	(United States) Duncan Dayton	(United States) Intersport Racing	8	NC	Ret	DNS	DNP		2	Ret	Ret	25
9	(Italy) Emanuele Pirro	(United States) Champion Racing	2									22
10	(United Kingdom) Jamie Davies	(United Kingdom) Audi Sport UK	3									19
10	(United Kingdom) Guy Smith	(United Kingdom) Audi Sport UK	3									19
10	(Netherlands) Jan Lammers	(United States) Dyson Racing Team	Ret							3		19
12	(United Kingdom) Martin Short	(United Kingdom) Rollcentre Racing	4									16
12	(United Kingdom) Rob Barff	(United Kingdom) Rollcentre Racing	4									16
12	(Portugal) Joăo Barbosa	(United Kingdom) Rollcentre Racing	4									16
13	(United States) Michael Lewis	(United States) Autocon Motorsports	6							Ret		12
13	(United States) Tomy Drissi	(United States) Autocon Motorsports	6							Ret		12
13	(United States) Vic Rice	(United States) Autocon Motorsports	6									12
14	(France) Christophe Bouchut	(France) Larbre Compétition	7									10
14	(France) Jean-Luc Blanchemain	(France) Larbre Compétition	7									10
14	(France) Roland Bervillé	(France) Larbre Compétition	7									10
15	(United States) Larry Connor	(United States) Intersport Racing	8									9
16	(Venezuela) Milka Duno	(United Kingdom) Taurus Sports Racing	9									8
16	(United Kingdom) Phil Andrews	(United Kingdom) Taurus Sports Racing	9									8
16	(United Kingdom) Justin Wilson	(United Kingdom) Taurus Sports Racing	9									8
-	(United States) Mike Durand	(United States) Intersport Racing	Ret							Ret		0
-	(France) Nicolas Minassian	(United Kingdom) Creation Autosportif								Ret	Ret	0
-	(United Kingdom) Jamie Campbell-Walter	(United Kingdom) Creation Autosportif								Ret	Ret	0
-	(Belgium) Didier de Radiguès	(United States) Dyson Racing Team	Ret									0
-	(United States) Chad Block	(United States) Intersport Racing	Ret									0
-	(France) Georges Forgeois	(United States) Intersport Racing	Ret									0
-	(United States) Jay Cochran	(United Kingdom) Team Elite	Ret									0
-	(United States) Ed Zabinski	(United Kingdom) Team Elite	Ret									0
-	(Republic of Ireland) Damien Faulkner	(United Kingdom) Team Elite	Ret									0
-	(Sweden) Niclas Jönsson	(United States) Intersport Racing						Ret				0
-	(Canada) Melanie Paterson	(United States) Autocon Motorsports								Ret		0
Pos.	Driver	Team	SEB (United States)	MOH (United States)	LIM (United States)	SON (United States)	POR (United States)	MOS (Canada)	ROA (United States)	ATL (United States)	LAG (United States)	Pts.

=== LMP1 Teams Championship ===
Manufacturers only scored the points for their highest finishing entry in each race. Only full season entries classified

Pos.	Team	No.	SEB (United States)	MOH (United States)	LIM (United States)	SON (United States)	POR (United States)	MOS (Canada)	ROA (United States)	ATL (United States)	LAG (United States)	Pts.
1	(United States) Champion Racing	2								2	1	183
1	(United States) Champion Racing	38	2	1	1	1	1	2	1	1	2	183
2	(United States) Dyson Racing Team	16	5	Ret	2	3	2	1	Ret	4	3	133
2	(United States) Dyson Racing Team	20	Ret	2	3	2	3	3	Ret	3	Ret	133
3	(United States) Intersport Racing	33	Ret									25
3	(United States) Intersport Racing	37	8	NC	Ret	DNS	DNP	Ret	2	Ret	Ret	25
NC	(United Kingdom) Audi Sport UK	28	1									0
NC	(United Kingdom) Audi Sport UK	88	3									0
NC	(United Kingdom) Rollcentre Racing	22	4									0
NC	(United States) Autocon Motorsports	12	6							Ret		0
NC	(France) Larbre Compétition	86	7									0
NC	(United Kingdom) Taurus Sports Racing	15	9									0
NC	(United Kingdom) Creation Autosportif	27								Ret	Ret	0
NC	(United Kingdom) Team Elite	50	Ret									0
Pos.	Team		SEB (United States)	MOH (United States)	LIM (United States)	SON (United States)	POR (United States)	MOS (Canada)	ROA (United States)	ATL (United States)	LAG (United States)	Pts.

=== LMP2 Drivers' Championship ===
Pos.	Driver	Team	SEB (United States)	MOH (United States)	LIM (United States)	SON (United States)	POR (United States)	MOS (Canada)	ROA (United States)	ATL (United States)	LAG (United States)	Pts.
1	(United Kingdom) Ian James	(United States) Miracle Motorsports	1	3	1	2	2	2	1	Ret	3	143
2	(United States) James Gue	(United States) Rand Racing	2									139
2	(United States) James Gue	(United States) Miracle Motorsports		3	1	2	2	2	1	Ret	3	139
3	(United States) Clint Field	(United States) Intersport Racing	NC	1	Ret	1	1	1	DSQ	1	1	129
3	(United Kingdom) Robin Liddell	(United States) Intersport Racing		1		1	1	1	DSQ	1	1	129
4	(United States) John Macaluso	(United States) Miracle Motorsports	1				2	2	2	Ret		74
5	(United States) Andy Lally	(United States) Rand Racing	Ret									54
5	(United States) Andy Lally	(United States) Race Car Company		2	2							54
5	(United States) Andy Lally	(United States) Marshall Cooke Racing								2		54
5	(United States) Ryan Eversley	(United States) Race Car Company		2	2							54
5	(United States) Ryan Eversley	(United States) Marshall Cooke Racing								2		54
6	(United States) Mike Borkowski	(United States) Miracle Motorsports	1						2			42
7	(United States) Jon Field	(United States) Intersport Racing				1	1					40
8	(United States) Bryan Willman	(United States) Team Bucknum Racing	Ret	Ret	Ret	3	Ret	DNS	Ret	Ret	2	32
8	(United States) Jeff Bucknum	(United States) Team Bucknum Racing	Ret	Ret	Ret	3	Ret	DNS	Ret	Ret	2	32
8	(United States) Chris McMurry	(United States) Team Bucknum Racing	Ret	Ret	Ret	3		DNS	Ret	Ret	2	32
9	(Venezuela) Milka Duno	(United States) Intersport Racing								1		26
10	(United States) Rick Sutherland	(United States) Intersport Racing	NC								1	23
11	(United States) Mike Fitzgerald	(United States) Rand Racing	2									22
11	(United States) Bill Rand	(United States) Rand Racing	2									22
11	(United States) Spencer Pumpelly	(United States) Marshall Cooke Racing								2		22
13	(United States) Erik van der Steur	(United States) Van der Steur Racing	Ret	4	Ret					Ret	DNS	10
13	(United States) Gunnar van der Steur	(United States) Van der Steur Racing	Ret	4	Ret					Ret	DNS	10
-	(United Kingdom) William Binnie	(United States) Intersport Racing	NC									0
-	(United States) Jason Workman	(United States) American Spirit Racing	Ret									0
-	(United States) Jason Workman	(United States) Marshall Cooke Racing								DNS		0
-	(United States) Scott Bradley	(United States) American Spirit Racing	Ret									0
-	(United States) Bobby Sak	(United States) American Spirit Racing	Ret									0
-	(United Kingdom) Marino Franchitti	(United States) Rand Racing	Ret									0
-	(United States) Derek Hill	(United States) Rand Racing	Ret									0
-	(United States) Mike Durand	(United States) Intersport Racing			Ret							0
-	(United Kingdom) Ben Devlin	(United States) Van der Steur Racing								Ret	DNS	0
-	(United States) Rich Grupp	(United States) Marshall Cooke Racing								DNS		0
Pos.	Driver	Team	SEB (United States)	MOH (United States)	LIM (United States)	SON (United States)	POR (United States)	MOS (Canada)	ROA (United States)	ATL (United States)	LAG (United States)	Pts.

=== LMP2 Teams Championship ===
Manufacturers only scored the points for their highest finishing entry in each race. Only full season entries were classified

Pos.	Team	No.	SEB (United States)	MOH (United States)	LIM (United States)	SON (United States)	POR (United States)	MOS (Canada)	ROA (United States)	ATL (United States)	LAG (United States)	Pts.
1	(United States) Miracle Motorsports (United States) American Spirit Racing	10	1	3	1	2	2	2	1	Ret	3	146
1	(United States) Miracle Motorsports (United States) American Spirit Racing	11	Ret						2			146
1	(United States) Miracle Motorsports (United States) American Spirit Racing	56								Ret	2	146
2	(United States) Intersport Racing	30	NC	1	Ret	1	1	1	DSQ	1	1	129
3	(United States) Team Bucknum Racing	56	Ret	Ret	Ret	3	Ret	DNS	Ret			13
NC	(United States) Race Car Company	13		2	2							0
NC	(United States) Rand Racing	7	2									0
NC	(United States) Rand Racing	8	Ret									0
NC	(United States) Marshall Cooke Racing	7								DNS		0
NC	(United States) Marshall Cooke Racing	13								2		0
NC	(United States) Van der Steur Racing	19	Ret	4	Ret					Ret	DNS	0
Pos.	Team		SEB (United States)	MOH (United States)	LIM (United States)	SON (United States)	POR (United States)	MOS (Canada)	ROA (United States)	ATL (United States)	LAG (United States)	Pts.

=== GTS Drivers' Championship ===
Pos.	Driver	Team	SEB (United States)	MOH (United States)	LIM (United States)	SON (United States)	POR (United States)	MOS (Canada)	ROA (United States)	ATL (United States)	LAG (United States)	Pts.
1	(Canada) Ron Fellows	(United States) Corvette Racing	1	1	2	1	1	2	2	2	1	179
1	(United States) Johnny O'Connell	(United States) Corvette Racing	1	1	2	1	1	2	2	2	1	179
2	(United Kingdom) Oliver Gavin	(United States) Corvette Racing	Ret	2	1	3	2	1	1	1	2	150
2	(Monaco) Olivier Beretta	(United States) Corvette Racing	Ret	2	1	3	2	1	1	1	2	150
3	(United States) Terry Borcheller	(United States) ACEMCO Motorsports	3	3	3	DSQ	3	3	3	4	3	116
3	(United Kingdom) Johnny Mowlem	(United States) ACEMCO Motorsports	3	3	3	DSQ	3	3	3	4	3	116
4	(United States) Tom Weickardt	(United States) Carsport America	Ret	DNS	4	4	DNS	4	4	3	Ret	59
4	(France) Jean-Philippe Belloc	(United States) Carsport America	Ret	DNS	4	4	DNS	4	4	3	Ret	59
5	(Italy) Max Papis	(United States) Corvette Racing	1							2		48
6	(United States) Tracy Krohn	(United States) Krohn-Barbour Racing		DNS	DNP	2	4	DNS		5		40
7	(Australia) David Brabham	(United States) ACEMCO Motorsports	3									29
7	(Australia) David Brabham	(United States) Krohn-Barbour Racing		4	NC	Ret	Ret	DNS		Ret		29
8	(Denmark) Jan Magnussen	(United States) Corvette Racing	Ret							1		26
9	(Netherlands) John Bosch	(Netherlands) Barron Connor Racing	2									22
9	(United States) Danny Sullivan	(Netherlands) Barron Connor Racing	2									22
9	(Italy) Thomas Biagi	(Netherlands) Barron Connor Racing	2									22
10	(Italy) Fabio Babini	(United States) Carsport America								3		19
11	(United States) David McEntee	(United States) Krohn-Barbour Racing				2						16
11	(Portugal) Joăo Barbosa	(United States) ACEMCO Motorsports								4		16
13	(Canada) Scott Maxwell	(United States) Krohn-Barbour Racing		DNS	DNP			DNS		5		14
13	(United States) Joe Fox	(United States) Krohn-Barbour Racing								5		14
14	(Netherlands) Peter Kox	(United States) Krohn-Barbour Racing		4	NC	Ret	Ret	DNS		Ret		10
14	(Sweden) Niclas Jönsson	(United States) Krohn-Barbour Racing					4			Ret		10
-	(United States) Kevin Allen	(United States) Carsport America	Ret									0
-	(Netherlands) Mike Hezemans	(Netherlands) Barron Connor Racing	Ret									0
-	(Switzerland) Jean-Denis Delétraz	(Netherlands) Barron Connor Racing	Ret									0
-	(France) Ange Barde	(Netherlands) Barron Connor Racing	Ret									0
-	(United States) Boris Said	(United States) Corvette Racing				DNS						0
-	(United States) Dale Earnhardt Jr.	(United States) Corvette Racing				DNS						0
Pos.	Driver	Team	SEB (United States)	MOH (United States)	LIM (United States)	SON (United States)	POR (United States)	MOS (Canada)	ROA (United States)	ATL (United States)	LAG (United States)	Pts.

=== GTS Teams Championship ===
Manufacturers only scored the points for their highest finishing entry in each race. Only full season entries were classified

Pos.	Team	No.	SEB (United States)	MOH (United States)	LIM (United States)	SON (United States)	POR (United States)	MOS (Canada)	ROA (United States)	ATL (United States)	LAG (United States)	Pts.
1	(United States) Corvette Racing	3	1	1	2	1	1	2	2	2	1	195
1	(United States) Corvette Racing	4	Ret	2	1	3	2	1	1	1	2	195
1	(United States) Corvette Racing	8				DNS						195
2	(United States) ACEMCO Motorsports	63	3	3	3	DSQ	3	3	3	4	3	116
3	(United States) Carsport America	71	Ret	DNS	4	4	DNS	4	4	3	Ret	59
4	(United States) Krohn-Barbour Racing	5		4	NC	Ret	Ret	DNS		Ret		50
4	(United States) Krohn-Barbour Racing	6		DNS	DNP	2	4	DNS		5		50
NC	(Netherlands) Barron Connor Racing	25	2									0
NC	(Netherlands) Barron Connor Racing	26	Ret									0
Pos.	Team		SEB (United States)	MOH (United States)	LIM (United States)	SON (United States)	POR (United States)	MOS (Canada)	ROA (United States)	ATL (United States)	LAG (United States)	Pts.

=== GT Drivers' Championship ===
Pos.	Driver	Team	SEB (United States)	MOH (United States)	LIM (United States)	SON (United States)	POR (United States)	MOS (Canada)	ROA (United States)	ATL (United States)	LAG (United States)	Pts.
1	(Germany) Timo Bernhard	(United States) Alex Job Racing	1	2	10	1	4	1	1	1	2	158
2	(United States) Johannes Van Overbeek	(United States) Flying Lizard Motorsports	4	1	2	2	2	3	3	5	3	140
2	(United States) Darren Law	(United States) Flying Lizard Motorsports	4	1	2	2	2	3	3	5	3	140
3	(Germany) Jörg Bergmeister	(United States) Alex Job Racing		2	10	1	4	1	1	1	2	132
4	(France) Romain Dumas	(United States) Alex Job Racing	2	7	3	3	1	11	Ret	2	1	117
4	(Germany) Marc Lieb	(United States) Alex Job Racing	2	7	3	3	1	11	Ret	2	1	117
5	(United States) Craig Stanton	(United States) White Lightning Racing	3	3	5	10	3	2	2	3	6	114
5	(United States) David Murry	(United States) White Lightning Racing	3	3	5	10	3	2	2	3	6	114
6	(United States) Cort Wagner	(United States) The Racer's Group	8	4	6	5	5	5	4	7	5	80
6	(United States) Patrick Long	(United States) The Racer's Group	8	4	6	5	5	5	4	7	5	80
7	(Germany) Ralf Kelleners	(United States) Risi Competizione	7	Ret	1	4	Ret	4		4	4	79
7	(United States) Anthony Lazzaro	(United States) Risi Competizione	7	Ret	1	4	Ret	4		4	4	79
8	(Germany) Sascha Maassen	(United States) Alex Job Racing	1							1		64
8	(Germany) Sascha Maassen	(United States) BAM!						9	7		8	64
9	(United States) Justin Jackson	(United States) J-3 Racing	6	Ret	4	6	7	7	5	8	9	58
9	(United Kingdom) Tim Sugden	(United States) J-3 Racing	6	Ret	4	6	7	7	5	8	9	58
10	(United States) Leo Hindery	(United States) BAM!	5	8	Ret	Ret	Ret	9	7	6	8	41
11	(Germany) Lucas Lühr	(United States) Alex Job Racing	2									40
11	(Germany) Lucas Lühr	(United States) BAM!			Ret	Ret	Ret			6	8	40
12	(United States) Seth Neiman	(United States) Flying Lizard Motorsports	Ret	9	7	8	6	6	6	12	10	31
12	(United States) Lonnie Pechnik	(United States) Flying Lizard Motorsports	Ret	9	7	8	6	6	6	12	10	31
13	(Italy) Fabrizio De Simone	(United States) Risi Competizione								4	4	29
14	(Germany) Mike Rockenfeller	(United States) BAM!	5									24
14	(Germany) Mike Rockenfeller	(United States) The Racer's Group								7		24
15	(Germany) Pierre Ehret	(United States) The Racer's Group	Ret	5	9	Ret	9		8	9	11	23
16	(Germany) Wolf Henzler	(United States) Alex Job Racing								2		22
17	(United States) Jon Fogarty	(United States) Flying Lizard Motorsports	4							12	10	20
18	(United States) Peter Baron	(United States) BAM!	5	8								17
19	(United States) Hugh Plumb	(United Kingdom) P.K. Sport	Ret	6	8	7	8					16
19	(United States) Peter Boss	(United Kingdom) P.K. Sport	Ret	6	8	7	8					16
20	(Netherlands) Patrick Huisman	(United States) Flying Lizard Motorsports								5		14
21	(United Kingdom) Adam Jones	(United States) BAM!								6		12
21	(United States) Brian Cunningham	(United States) J-3 Racing	6									12
21	(United States) Jim Matthews	(United States) The Racer's Group	Ret	5	9	Ret	9					12
21	(United States) Gunnar Jeannette	(United States) Panoz Motor Sports		Ret	Ret	9	Ret	8	Ret	13	7	12
25	(United States) Philip Collin	(Germany) Seikel Motorsport	Ret									11
25	(United States) Philip Collin	(United States) The Racer's Group							8	9		11
26	(Italy) Matteo Bobbi	(United States) Risi Competizione	7									10
27	(France) Xavier Pompidou	(United States) J-3 Racing								8		9
27	(United States) Kelly Collins	(United States) The Racer's Group	8									9
27	(United States) Kelly Collins	(United States) Panoz Motor Sports			Ret		Ret					9
27	(United Kingdom) Piers Masarati	(United States) The Racer's Group	9									9
27	(United Kingdom) Piers Masarati	(United Kingdom) P.K. Sport						10		Ret	Ret	9
30	(United Kingdom) Robert Nearn	(United States) The Racer's Group								9		8
30	(United Kingdom) Ian Donaldson	(United States) The Racer's Group	9									8
30	(United Kingdom) Ian Donaldson	(United Kingdom) P.K. Sport								Ret		8
30	(United Kingdom) Gregor Fisken	(United States) The Racer's Group	9									8
32	(France) Christophe Bouchut	(United Kingdom) Cirtek Motorsport								10		7
32	(Monaco) Stéphane Ortelli	(United Kingdom) Cirtek Motorsport								10		7
33	(United Kingdom) Adam Sharpe	(United Kingdom) Morgan Works Racing Team	10									7
33	(New Zealand) Neil Cunningham	(United Kingdom) Morgan Works Racing Team	10									7
33	(United Kingdom) Keith Ahlers	(United Kingdom) Morgan Works Racing Team	10									7
33	(United Kingdom) Marino Franchitti	(United States) Panoz Motor Sports								13	7	7
35	(Belgium) David Saelens	(United States) Panoz Motor Sports		Ret		9		8	Ret			5
36	(Canada) Tony Burgess	(Germany) Seikel Motorsport	Ret									1
36	(Canada) Tony Burgess	(United Kingdom) P.K. Sport						10				1
-	(United States) Romeo Kapudija	(United States) J-3 Racing	11									0
-	(Sweden) Niclas Jönsson	(United States) J-3 Racing	11									0
-	(United States) Dorsey Porter, Jr.	(United States) J-3 Racing	11									0
-	(Mexico) Randy Wars	(United States) J-3 Racing			11					Ret		0
-	(Canada) Melanie Paterson	(United States) J-3 Racing			11							0
-	(United States) Andrew Davis	(United States) Foxhill Racing								11		0
-	(United States) Michael Cawley	(United States) Foxhill Racing								11		0
-	(United States) Charles Espenlaub	(United States) Foxhill Racing								11		0
-	(Canada) Robert Julien	(United States) The Racer's Group									11	0
-	(United Kingdom) Christopher Stockton	(United Kingdom) Chamberlain-Synergy Motorsport	12									0
-	(United Kingdom) Gareth Evans	(United Kingdom) Chamberlain-Synergy Motorsport	12									0
-	(United Kingdom) Amanda Stretton	(United Kingdom) Chamberlain-Synergy Motorsport	12									0
-	(France) Christophe Tinseau	(United States) Panoz Motor Sports								13		0
-	(New Zealand) Rob Wilson	(United Kingdom) Cirtek Motorsport	Ret							Ret		0
-	(United Kingdom) Frank Mountain	(United Kingdom) Cirtek Motorsport	Ret							Ret		0
-	(United Kingdom) Robert Brooks	(United Kingdom) Cirtek Motorsport	Ret									0
-	(Italy) Alex Caffi	(United Kingdom) P.K. Sport	Ret									0
-	(United Kingdom) David Warnock	(United Kingdom) P.K. Sport	Ret									0
-	(United States) Tracy Krohn	(United Kingdom) P.K. Sport	Ret									0
-	(United Kingdom) Robin Liddell	(United Kingdom) P.K. Sport	Ret									0
-	(United Kingdom) Bob Berridge	(United Kingdom) Chamberlain-Synergy Motorsport	Ret									0
-	(United Kingdom) Lee Caroline	(United Kingdom) Chamberlain-Synergy Motorsport	Ret									0
-	(United Kingdom) Michael Caine	(United Kingdom) Chamberlain-Synergy Motorsport	Ret									0
-	(United States) Peter Cunningham	(United States) Flying Lizard Motorsports	Ret									0
-	(United States) Marc Bunting	(United States) The Racer's Group	Ret									0
-	(United States) Grady Willingham	(Germany) Seikel Motorsport	Ret									0
-	(United States) Liz Halliday	(United Kingdom) P.K. Sport								Ret	Ret	0
-	(Italy) Andrea Montermini	(United Kingdom) Cirtek Motorsport								Ret		0
-	(Puerto Rico) Manuel Matos	(United States) J-3 Racing								Ret		0
-	(United States) Rick Skelton	(United States) J-3 Racing								Ret		0
Pos.	Driver	Team	SEB (United States)	MOH (United States)	LIM (United States)	SON (United States)	POR (United States)	MOS (Canada)	ROA (United States)	ATL (United States)	LAG (United States)	Pts.

=== GT Teams Championship ===
Manufacturers only scored the points for their highest finishing entry in each race. Only full season entries were classified

Pos.	Team	No.	SEB (United States)	MOH (United States)	LIM (United States)	SON (United States)	POR (United States)	MOS (Canada)	ROA (United States)	ATL (United States)	LAG (United States)	Pts.
1	(United States) Alex Job Racing	23	1	2	10	1	4	1	1	1	2	184
1	(United States) Alex Job Racing	24	2	7	3	3	1	11	Ret	2	1	184
2	(United States) Flying Lizard Motorsports	44	Ret	9	7	8	6	6	6	12	10	140
2	(United States) Flying Lizard Motorsports	45	4	1	2	2	2	3	3	5	3	140
3	(United States) White Lightning Racing	31	3	3	5	10	3	2	2	3	6	114
4	(United States) The Racer's Group	66	8	4	6	5	5	5	4	7	5	80
4	(United States) The Racer's Group	67	Ret	5	9	Ret			8	9	11	80
4	(United States) The Racer's Group	68	9									80
5	(United States) Risi Competizione	35	7	Ret	1	4	Ret	4		4	4	79
6	(United States) J-3 Racing	78	11		11		DNS			Ret		58
6	(United States) J-3 Racing	79	6	Ret	4	6	7	7	5	8	9	58
7	(United States) BAM!	43	5	8	Ret	Ret	Ret	9	7	6	8	41
8	(United Kingdom) P.K. Sport	60	Ret	6	8	7	8	10		Ret	Ret	17
8	(United Kingdom) P.K. Sport	61	Ret									17
9	(United States) Panoz Motor Sports	50		Ret	Ret	9	Ret	8	Ret	13	7	12
NC	(United Kingdom) Morgan Works Racing Team	49	10									0
NC	(United Kingdom) Cirtek Motorsport	32	Ret									0
NC	(United Kingdom) Cirtek Motorsport	92	Ret							10		0
NC	(United States) Foxhill Racing	8								11		0
NC	(United Kingdom) Chamberlain-Synergy Motorsport	91	12									0
NC	(United Kingdom) Chamberlain-Synergy Motorsport	92	Ret									0
NC	(Germany) Seikel Motorsport	52	Ret									0
Pos.	Team		SEB (United States)	MOH (United States)	LIM (United States)	SON (United States)	POR (United States)	MOS (Canada)	ROA (United States)	ATL (United States)	LAG (United States)	Pts.
