= 2004 Portland Grand Prix =

Fifth race for the 2004 American Le Mans Series season

Track map of Portland International Raceway

The 2004 Portland Grand Prix was the fifth race for the 2004 American Le Mans Series season held at Portland International Raceway. It took place on July 25, 2004.

== Official results ==
Class winners in bold. Cars failing to complete 70% of winner's distance marked as Not Classified (NC).

Pos	Class	No	Team	Drivers	Chassis	Tyre	Laps
Pos	Class	No	Team	Drivers	Engine	Tyre	Laps
1	**LMP1**	**38**	**(United States) ADT Champion Racing**	**(Germany) Marco Werner (Finland) JJ Lehto**	**Audi R8**	MI	**141**
1	**LMP1**	**38**	**(United States) ADT Champion Racing**	**(Germany) Marco Werner (Finland) JJ Lehto**	**Audi 3.6L Turbo V8**	MI	**141**
2	LMP1	16	(United States) Dyson Racing	(United States) Butch Leitzinger (United Kingdom) James Weaver	MG-Lola EX257	G	141
2	LMP1	16	(United States) Dyson Racing	(United States) Butch Leitzinger (United Kingdom) James Weaver	MG (AER) XP20 2.0L Turbo I4	G	141
3	**GTS**	**3**	**(United States) Corvette Racing**	**(Canada) Ron Fellows (United States) Johnny O'Connell**	**Chevrolet Corvette C5-R**	MI	**135**
3	**GTS**	**3**	**(United States) Corvette Racing**	**(Canada) Ron Fellows (United States) Johnny O'Connell**	**Chevrolet 7.0L V8**	MI	**135**
4	GTS	4	(United States) Corvette Racing	(United Kingdom) Oliver Gavin (Monaco) Olivier Beretta	Chevrolet Corvette C5-R	MI	133
4	GTS	4	(United States) Corvette Racing	(United Kingdom) Oliver Gavin (Monaco) Olivier Beretta	Chevrolet 7.0L V8	MI	133
5	**LMP2**	**30**	**(United States) Intersport Racing**	**(United States) Jon Field (United States) Clint Field (United Kingdom) Robin Liddell**	**Lola B2K/40**	P	**129**
5	**LMP2**	**30**	**(United States) Intersport Racing**	**(United States) Jon Field (United States) Clint Field (United Kingdom) Robin Liddell**	**Judd KV675 3.4L V8**	P	**129**
6	LMP1	20	(United States) Dyson Racing	(United States) Chris Dyson (United Kingdom) Andy Wallace	MG-Lola EX257	G	129
6	LMP1	20	(United States) Dyson Racing	(United States) Chris Dyson (United Kingdom) Andy Wallace	MG (AER) XP20 2.0L Turbo I4	G	129
7	**GT**	**24**	**(United States) Alex Job Racing**	**(Germany) Marc Lieb (France) Romain Dumas**	**Porsche 911 GT3-RSR**	MI	**128**
7	**GT**	**24**	**(United States) Alex Job Racing**	**(Germany) Marc Lieb (France) Romain Dumas**	**Porsche 3.6L Flat-6**	MI	**128**
8	GT	45	(United States) Flying Lizard Motorsports	(United States) Johannes van Overbeek (United States) Darren Law	Porsche 911 GT3-RSR	MI	128
8	GT	45	(United States) Flying Lizard Motorsports	(United States) Johannes van Overbeek (United States) Darren Law	Porsche 3.6L Flat-6	MI	128
9	GT	31	(United States) White Lightning Racing	(United States) David Murry (United States) Craig Stanton	Porsche 911 GT3-RSR	MI	127
9	GT	31	(United States) White Lightning Racing	(United States) David Murry (United States) Craig Stanton	Porsche 3.6L Flat-6	MI	127
10	GT	23	(United States) Alex Job Racing	(Germany) Jörg Bergmeister (Germany) Timo Bernhard	Porsche 911 GT3-RSR	MI	127
10	GT	23	(United States) Alex Job Racing	(Germany) Jörg Bergmeister (Germany) Timo Bernhard	Porsche 3.6L Flat-6	MI	127
11	GT	66	(United States) New Century - The Racer's Group	(United States) Patrick Long (United States) Cort Wagner	Porsche 911 GT3-RSR	MI	127
11	GT	66	(United States) New Century - The Racer's Group	(United States) Patrick Long (United States) Cort Wagner	Porsche 3.6L Flat-6	MI	127
12	GT	44	(United States) Flying Lizard Motorsports	(United States) Seth Neiman (United States) Lonnie Pechnik	Porsche 911 GT3-RSR	MI	124
12	GT	44	(United States) Flying Lizard Motorsports	(United States) Seth Neiman (United States) Lonnie Pechnik	Porsche 3.6L Flat-6	MI	124
13	GT	79	(United States) J-3 Racing	(United States) Justin Jackson (United Kingdom) Tim Sugden	Porsche 911 GT3-RSR	MI	124
13	GT	79	(United States) J-3 Racing	(United States) Justin Jackson (United Kingdom) Tim Sugden	Porsche 3.6L Flat-6	MI	124
14	GT	60	(United Kingdom) P.K. Sport	(United States) Peter Boss (United States) Hugh Plumb	Porsche 911 GT3-RS	P	123
14	GT	60	(United Kingdom) P.K. Sport	(United States) Peter Boss (United States) Hugh Plumb	Porsche 3.6L Flat-6	P	123
15	GT	67	(United States) New Century - The Racer's Group	(United States) Jim Matthews (Germany) Pierre Ehret	Porsche 911 GT3-RSR	MI	119
15	GT	67	(United States) New Century - The Racer's Group	(United States) Jim Matthews (Germany) Pierre Ehret	Porsche 3.6L Flat-6	MI	119
16	GTS	63	(United States) ACEMCO Motorsports	(United States) Terry Borcheller (United Kingdom) Johnny Mowlem	Saleen S7-R	P	113
16	GTS	63	(United States) ACEMCO Motorsports	(United States) Terry Borcheller (United Kingdom) Johnny Mowlem	Ford 7.0L V8	P	113
17	LMP2	10	(United States) Miracle Motorsports	(United States) Ian James (United States) James Gue (United States) John Macaluso	Lola B2K/40	Y	112
17	LMP2	10	(United States) Miracle Motorsports	(United States) Ian James (United States) James Gue (United States) John Macaluso	Nissan (AER) 3.0L V6	Y	112
18 DNF	GTS	6	(United States) Krohn-Barbour Racing	(United States) Tracy Krohn (Sweden) Niclas Jönsson	Lamborghini Murcielago R-GT	P	103
18 DNF	GTS	6	(United States) Krohn-Barbour Racing	(United States) Tracy Krohn (Sweden) Niclas Jönsson	Lamborghini 6.0L V12	P	103
19 DNF	GTS	5	(United States) Krohn-Barbour Racing	(Netherlands) Peter Kox (Australia) David Brabham	Lamborghini Murcielago R-GT	P	91
19 DNF	GTS	5	(United States) Krohn-Barbour Racing	(Netherlands) Peter Kox (Australia) David Brabham	Lamborghini 6.0L V12	P	91
20 DNF	GT	43	(United States) BAM!	(United States) Leo Hindery (Germany) Marc Lieb	Porsche 911 GT3-RSR	MI	83
20 DNF	GT	43	(United States) BAM!	(United States) Leo Hindery (Germany) Marc Lieb	Porsche 3.6L Flat-6	MI	83
21 DNF	LMP2	56	(United States) Team Bucknum Racing	(United States) Jeff Bucknum (United States) Bryan Willman	Pilbeam MP91	D	56
21 DNF	LMP2	56	(United States) Team Bucknum Racing	(United States) Jeff Bucknum (United States) Bryan Willman	Nissan (AER) 3.0L V6	D	56
22 DNF	GT	35	(United States) Risi Competizione	(United States) Anthony Lazzaro (Germany) Ralf Kelleners	Ferrari 360 Modena GTC	P	36
22 DNF	GT	35	(United States) Risi Competizione	(United States) Anthony Lazzaro (Germany) Ralf Kelleners	Ferrari 3.6L V8	P	36
23 DNF	GT	50	(United States) Panoz Motor Sports	(United States) Gunnar Jeannette (United States) Kelly Collins	Panoz Esperante GT-LM	P	27
23 DNF	GT	50	(United States) Panoz Motor Sports	(United States) Gunnar Jeannette (United States) Kelly Collins	Ford (Elan) 5.0L V8	P	27

== Statistics ==
- Pole Position - #20 Dyson Racing - 1:04.750
- Fastest Lap - #38 ADT Champion Racing - 1:05.129
- Distance - 274.104 miles (441.128 km)
- Average Speed - 99.082 mph (159.457 km/h)

American Le Mans Series
Previous race: 2004 Grand Prix of Sonoma	2004 season	Next race: 2004 Grand Prix of Mosport
