= 2004 Grand Prix of Sonoma =

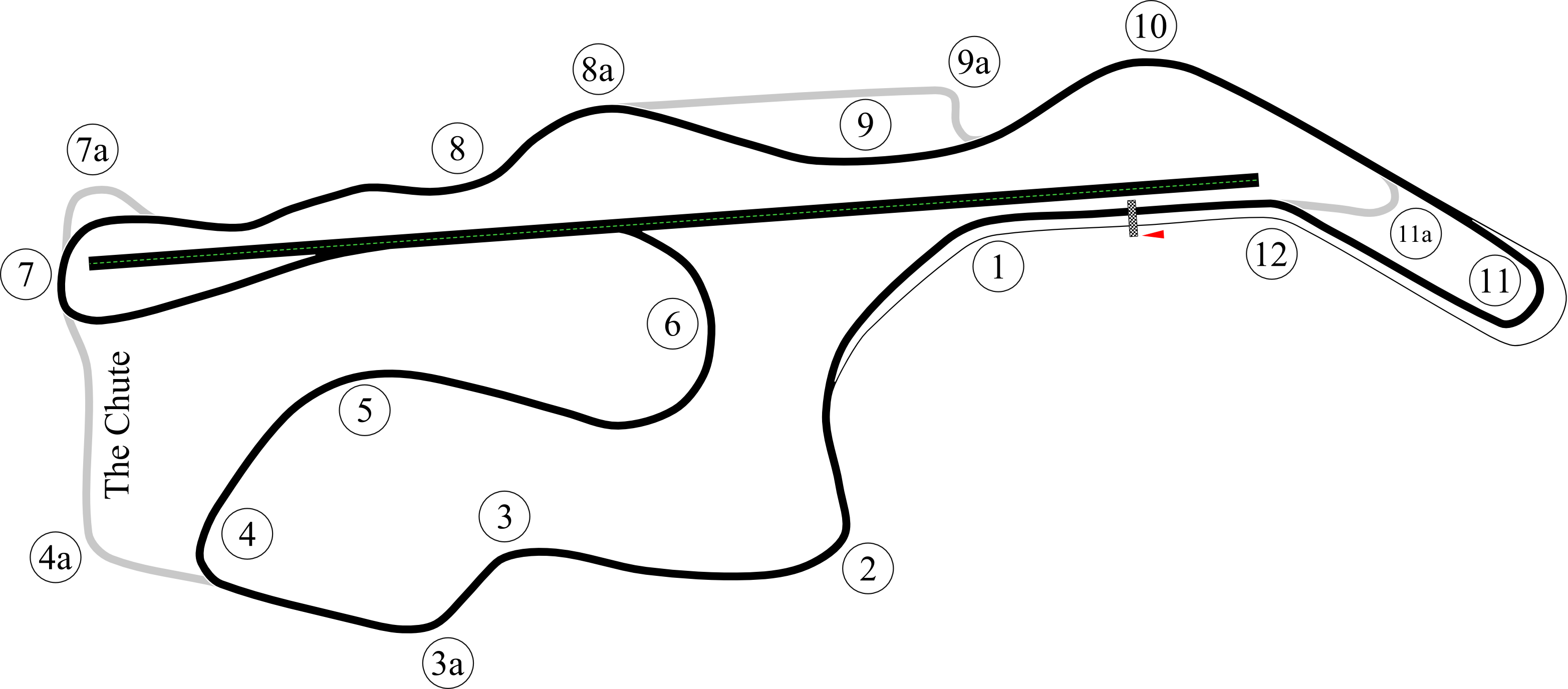
Sonoma Raceway

The 2004 Grand Prix of Sonoma was the fourth race for the 2004 American Le Mans Series season held at Infineon Raceway. It took place on July 18, 2004.

This race saw Corvette Racing enter a third Corvette C5-R for Dale Earnhardt Jr. and co-driven by Boris Said. The car was successfully qualified but in warm-up the morning of the race, Earnhardt Jr. went off course and collided with a barrier, causing a rupture of a fuel line. The broken fuel line was sparked when the car came to a stop and caused the car to be engulfed in flames, with Earnhardt Jr. inside dazed by the accident and unable to get himself out immediately. Once Earnhardt Jr. was able to become aware of his situation and rescue crews were able to arrive, Earnhardt Jr. was successfully pulled from the burning vehicle. He received second and third degree burns to his neck, chest, and legs, partially due to not wearing a fire-retardant balaclava with his helmet.

The Corvette C5-R was burned beyond repair and did not race. The Corvette Racing team quickly examined the car and found that there was no design flaw in their fuel system. At the end of the 2004 ALMS season, Corvette Racing restored the car (Chassis No. C5-009) to its 2003 Le Mans specification and sold it to a collector.

Earnhardt Jr. was forced to return to the Nextel Cup Series unable to complete full races as he underwent treatment, being relieved the next two races by Martin Truex Jr. and John Andretti.

== Official results ==
Class winners in bold. Cars failing to complete 70% of winner's distance marked as Not Classified (NC).

| Pos | Class | No | Team | Drivers | Chassis | Tyre | Laps |
| Pos | Class | No | Team | Drivers | Engine | Tyre | Laps |
|---|---|---|---|---|---|---|---|
| 1 | **LMP1** | **38** | **(United States) ADT Champion Racing** | **(Germany) Marco Werner (Finland) JJ Lehto** | **Audi R8** | M | **107** |
| 1 | **LMP1** | **38** | **(United States) ADT Champion Racing** | **(Germany) Marco Werner (Finland) JJ Lehto** | **Audi 3.6L Turbo V8** | M | **107** |
| 2 | LMP1 | 20 | (United States) Dyson Racing | (United States) Chris Dyson (United Kingdom) Andy Wallace | MG-Lola EX257 | G | 107 |
| 2 | LMP1 | 20 | (United States) Dyson Racing | (United States) Chris Dyson (United Kingdom) Andy Wallace | MG (AER) XP20 2.0L Turbo I4 | G | 107 |
| 3 | LMP1 | 16 | (United States) Dyson Racing | (United States) Butch Leitzinger (United Kingdom) James Weaver | MG-Lola EX257 | G | 104 |
| 3 | LMP1 | 16 | (United States) Dyson Racing | (United States) Butch Leitzinger (United Kingdom) James Weaver | MG (AER) XP20 2.0L Turbo I4 | G | 104 |
| 4 | **GTS** | **3** | **(United States) Corvette Racing** | **(Canada) Ron Fellows (United States) Johnny O'Connell** | **Chevrolet Corvette C5-R** | M | **102** |
| 4 | **GTS** | **3** | **(United States) Corvette Racing** | **(Canada) Ron Fellows (United States) Johnny O'Connell** | **Chevrolet LS7-R 7.0L V8** | M | **102** |
| 5 | **LMP2** | **30** | **(United States) Intersport Racing** | **(United States) Jon Field (United States) Clint Field (United Kingdom) Robin Liddell** | **Lola B2K/40** | P | **102** |
| 5 | **LMP2** | **30** | **(United States) Intersport Racing** | **(United States) Jon Field (United States) Clint Field (United Kingdom) Robin Liddell** | **Judd KV675 3.4L V8** | P | **102** |
| 6 | LMP2 | 10 | (United States) Miracle Motorsports | (United States) Ian James (United States) James Gue | Lola B2K/40 | Y | 100 |
| 6 | LMP2 | 10 | (United States) Miracle Motorsports | (United States) Ian James (United States) James Gue | Nissan (AER) VQL 3.0L V6 | Y | 100 |
| 7 | LMP2 | 56 | (United States) Team Bucknum Racing | (United States) Jeff Bucknum (United States) Bryan Willman (United States) Chris McMurry | Pilbeam MP91 | D | 98 |
| 7 | LMP2 | 56 | (United States) Team Bucknum Racing | (United States) Jeff Bucknum (United States) Bryan Willman (United States) Chris McMurry | Nissan (AER) VQL 3.0L V6 | D | 98 |
| 8 | **GT** | **23** | **(United States) Alex Job Racing** | **(Germany) Jörg Bergmeister (Germany) Timo Bernhard** | **Porsche 911 GT3-RSR** | M | **98** |
| 8 | **GT** | **23** | **(United States) Alex Job Racing** | **(Germany) Jörg Bergmeister (Germany) Timo Bernhard** | **Porsche 3.6L Flat-6** | M | **98** |
| 9 | GT | 45 | (United States) Flying Lizard Motorsports | (United States) Johannes van Overbeek (United States) Darren Law | Porsche 911 GT3-RSR | M | 98 |
| 9 | GT | 45 | (United States) Flying Lizard Motorsports | (United States) Johannes van Overbeek (United States) Darren Law | Porsche 3.6L Flat-6 | M | 98 |
| 10 | GT | 24 | (United States) Alex Job Racing | (Germany) Marc Lieb (France) Romain Dumas | Porsche 911 GT3-RSR | M | 98 |
| 10 | GT | 24 | (United States) Alex Job Racing | (Germany) Marc Lieb (France) Romain Dumas | Porsche 3.6L Flat-6 | M | 98 |
| 11 | GT | 35 | (United States) Risi Competizione | (United States) Anthony Lazzaro (Germany) Ralf Kelleners | Ferrari 360 Modena GTC | P | 97 |
| 11 | GT | 35 | (United States) Risi Competizione | (United States) Anthony Lazzaro (Germany) Ralf Kelleners | Ferrari 3.6L V8 | P | 97 |
| 12 | GT | 66 | (United States) New Century - The Racer's Group | (United States) Patrick Long (United States) Cort Wagner | Porsche 911 GT3-RSR | M | 96 |
| 12 | GT | 66 | (United States) New Century - The Racer's Group | (United States) Patrick Long (United States) Cort Wagner | Porsche 3.6L Flat-6 | M | 96 |
| 13 | GT | 79 | (United States) J-3 Racing | (United States) Justin Jackson (United Kingdom) Tim Sugden | Porsche 911 GT3-RSR | M | 95 |
| 13 | GT | 79 | (United States) J-3 Racing | (United States) Justin Jackson (United Kingdom) Tim Sugden | Porsche 3.6L Flat-6 | M | 95 |
| 14 | GT | 60 | (United Kingdom) P.K. Sport | (United States) Hugh Plumb (United States) Peter Boss | Porsche 911 GT3-RS | P | 92 |
| 14 | GT | 60 | (United Kingdom) P.K. Sport | (United States) Hugh Plumb (United States) Peter Boss | Porsche 3.6L Flat-6 | P | 92 |
| 15 | GT | 44 | (United States) Flying Lizard Motorsports | (United States) Seth Neiman (United States) Lonnie Pechnik | Porsche 911 GT3-RSR | M | 92 |
| 15 | GT | 44 | (United States) Flying Lizard Motorsports | (United States) Seth Neiman (United States) Lonnie Pechnik | Porsche 3.6L Flat-6 | M | 92 |
| 16 | GTS | 6 | (United States) Krohn-Barbour Racing | (United States) Tracy Krohn (United States) David McEntee | Lamborghini Murciélago R-GT | P | 90 |
| 16 | GTS | 6 | (United States) Krohn-Barbour Racing | (United States) Tracy Krohn (United States) David McEntee | Lamborghini 6.0L V12 | P | 90 |
| 17 | GT | 50 | (United States) Panoz Motor Sports | (United States) Gunnar Jeannette (Belgium) David Saelens | Panoz Esperante GT-LM | P | 88 |
| 17 | GT | 50 | (United States) Panoz Motor Sports | (United States) Gunnar Jeannette (Belgium) David Saelens | Ford (Élan) 5.0L V8 | P | 88 |
| 18 | GTS | 4 | (United States) Corvette Racing | (United Kingdom) Oliver Gavin (Monaco) Olivier Beretta | Chevrolet Corvette C5-R | M | 86 |
| 18 | GTS | 4 | (United States) Corvette Racing | (United Kingdom) Oliver Gavin (Monaco) Olivier Beretta | Chevrolet LS7-R 7.0L V8 | M | 86 |
| 19 | GT | 31 | (United States) White Lightning Racing | (United States) Craig Stanton (United States) David Murry | Porsche 911 GT3-RSR | M | 85 |
| 19 | GT | 31 | (United States) White Lightning Racing | (United States) Craig Stanton (United States) David Murry | Porsche 3.6L Flat-6 | M | 85 |
| 20 | GTS | 71 | (United States) Carsport America | (United States) Tom Weickardt (France) Jean-Philippe Belloc | Dodge Viper GTS-R | P | 75 |
| 20 | GTS | 71 | (United States) Carsport America | (United States) Tom Weickardt (France) Jean-Philippe Belloc | Dodge 8.0L V10 | P | 75 |
| 21 DNF | GT | 67 | (United States) New Century - The Racer's Group | (United States) Jim Matthews (Germany) Pierre Ehret | Porsche 911 GT3-RSR | M | 52 |
| 21 DNF | GT | 67 | (United States) New Century - The Racer's Group | (United States) Jim Matthews (Germany) Pierre Ehret | Porsche 3.6L Flat-6 | M | 52 |
| 22 DNF | GTS | 5 | (United States) Krohn-Barbour Racing | (Netherlands) Peter Kox (Australia) David Brabham | Lamborghini Murciélago R-GT | P | 15 |
| 22 DNF | GTS | 5 | (United States) Krohn-Barbour Racing | (Netherlands) Peter Kox (Australia) David Brabham | Lamborghini 6.0L V12 | P | 15 |
| 23 DNF | GT | 43 | (United States) BAM! | (United States) Leo Hindery (Germany) Lucas Luhr | Porsche 911 GT3-RSR | M | 15 |
| 23 DNF | GT | 43 | (United States) BAM! | (United States) Leo Hindery (Germany) Lucas Luhr | Porsche 3.6L Flat-6 | M | 15 |
| 24 DSQ | GTS | 63 | (United States) ACEMCO Motorsports | (United States) Terry Borcheller (United Kingdom) Johnny Mowlem | Saleen S7-R | P | 58 |
| 24 DSQ | GTS | 63 | (United States) ACEMCO Motorsports | (United States) Terry Borcheller (United Kingdom) Johnny Mowlem | Ford 7.0L V8 | P | 58 |
| DNS | GTS | 8 | (United States) Corvette Racing | (United States) Dale Earnhardt Jr. (United States) Boris Said | Chevrolet Corvette C5-R | M | - |
| DNS | GTS | 8 | (United States) Corvette Racing | (United States) Dale Earnhardt Jr. (United States) Boris Said | Chevrolet LS7-R 7.0L V8 | M | - |

== Statistics ==
- Pole Position - #38 ADT Champion Racing - 1:22.320
- Fastest Lap - #38 ADT Champion Racing - 1:23.656
- Distance - 270.71 miles (435.67 km)
- Average Speed - 98.082 mph (157.848 km/h)

American Le Mans Series
| Previous race: 2004 New England Grand Prix | 2004 season | Next race: 2004 Portland Grand Prix |
