= 2004 Grand Prix of Mosport =

Motor racing meeting

Mosport International Raceway

The 2004 Toronto Grand Prix of Mosport was an American Le Mans Series professional sports car race held at Mosport International Raceway near Bowmanville, Ontario, Canada from August 6 to the 8, 2004. It was the sixth race of the 2004 American Le Mans Series season and the 19th IMSA sanctioned sports car race held at the facility.

== Race ==
The LMP1 and overall race victory went to Dyson Racing drivers Butch Leitzinger and James Weaver for their first victory of the season in the MG-Lola EX257. After winning the previous four rounds, ADT Champion Racing drivers Marco Werner and JJ Lehto finished second in the Audi R8, with the second Dyson Racing entry of Chris Dyson and Andy Wallace finishing third.

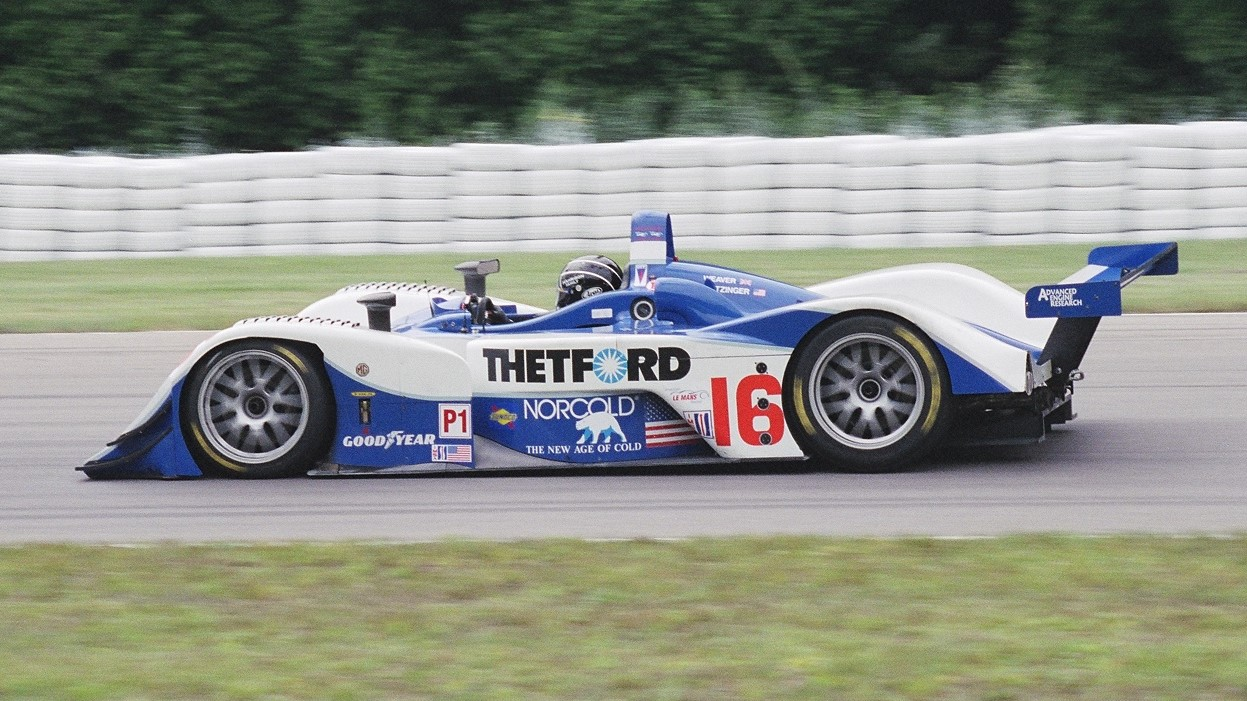
Dyson Racing MG-Lola EX257 - Winner 2004 Grand Prix of Mosport

The GTS class win went to Corvette Racing's Oliver Gavin and Olivier Beretta in the Chevrolet Corvette C5-R, with Intersport Racing's Clint Field and Robin Liddell taking the LMP2 victory in the Lola B2K/40. Alex Job Racing drivers Jörg Bergmeister and Timo Bernhard won the GT class in a Porsche 911 GT3-RSR.

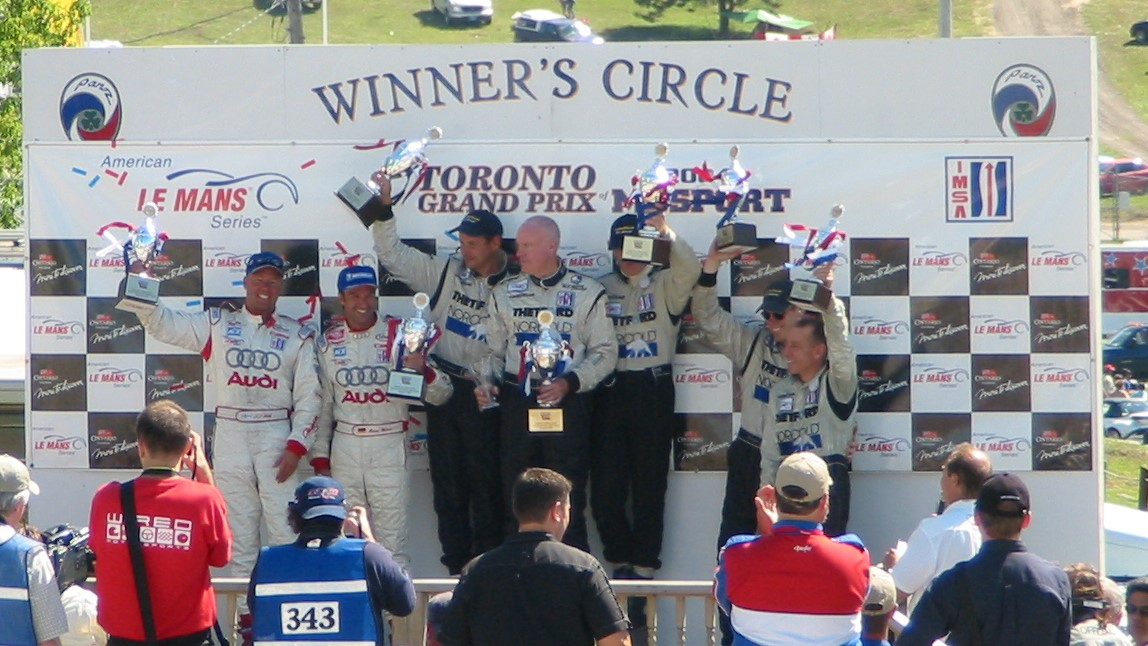
Winners Podium

The race was broadcast across North America on CBS Sports with Ralph Sheheen and Bill Adam calling the race.

== Official results ==
Class winners in bold. Cars failing to complete 70% of winner's distance marked as Not Classified (NC).

Pos	Class	No	Team	Drivers	Chassis	Tyre	Laps
Pos	Class	No	Team	Drivers	Engine	Tyre	Laps
1	**LMP1**	**16**	**(United States) Dyson Racing**	**(United States) Butch Leitzinger (United Kingdom) James Weaver**	**MG-Lola EX257**	G	**137**
1	**LMP1**	**16**	**(United States) Dyson Racing**	**(United States) Butch Leitzinger (United Kingdom) James Weaver**	**MG (AER) XP20 2.0L Turbo I4**	G	**137**
2	LMP1	38	(United States) ADT Champion Racing	(Germany) Marco Werner (Finland) JJ Lehto	Audi R8	MI	137
2	LMP1	38	(United States) ADT Champion Racing	(Germany) Marco Werner (Finland) JJ Lehto	Audi 3.6L Turbo V8	MI	137
3	LMP1	20	(United States) Dyson Racing	(United States) Chris Dyson (United Kingdom) Andy Wallace	MG-Lola EX257	G	135
3	LMP1	20	(United States) Dyson Racing	(United States) Chris Dyson (United Kingdom) Andy Wallace	MG (AER) XP20 2.0L Turbo I4	G	135
4	**GTS**	**4**	**(United States) Corvette Racing**	**(United Kingdom) Oliver Gavin (Monaco) Olivier Beretta**	**Chevrolet Corvette C5-R**	MI	**129**
4	**GTS**	**4**	**(United States) Corvette Racing**	**(United Kingdom) Oliver Gavin (Monaco) Olivier Beretta**	**Chevrolet 7.0L V8**	MI	**129**
5	GTS	3	(United States) Corvette Racing	(Canada) Ron Fellows (United States) Johnny O'Connell	Chevrolet Corvette C5-R	MI	129
5	GTS	3	(United States) Corvette Racing	(Canada) Ron Fellows (United States) Johnny O'Connell	Chevrolet 7.0L V8	MI	129
6	**LMP2**	**30**	**(United States) Intersport Racing**	**(United States) Clint Field (United Kingdom) Robin Liddell**	**Lola B2K/40**	P	**127**
6	**LMP2**	**30**	**(United States) Intersport Racing**	**(United States) Clint Field (United Kingdom) Robin Liddell**	**Judd KV675 3.4L V8**	P	**127**
7	GTS	63	(United States) ACEMCO Motorsports	(United States) Terry Borcheller (United Kingdom) Johnny Mowlem	Saleen S7-R	P	125
7	GTS	63	(United States) ACEMCO Motorsports	(United States) Terry Borcheller (United Kingdom) Johnny Mowlem	Ford 7.0L V8	P	125
8	**GT**	**23**	**(United States) Alex Job Racing**	**(Germany) Jörg Bergmeister (Germany) Timo Bernhard**	**Porsche 911 GT3-RSR**	MI	**120**
8	**GT**	**23**	**(United States) Alex Job Racing**	**(Germany) Jörg Bergmeister (Germany) Timo Bernhard**	**Porsche 3.6L Flat-6**	MI	**120**
9	GT	31	(United States) White Lightning Racing	(United States) David Murry (United States) Craig Stanton	Porsche 911 GT3-RSR	MI	120
9	GT	31	(United States) White Lightning Racing	(United States) David Murry (United States) Craig Stanton	Porsche 3.6L Flat-6	MI	120
10	GT	45	(United States) Flying Lizard Motorsports	(United States) Johannes van Overbeek (United States) Darren Law	Porsche 911 GT3-RSR	MI	120
10	GT	45	(United States) Flying Lizard Motorsports	(United States) Johannes van Overbeek (United States) Darren Law	Porsche 3.6L Flat-6	MI	120
11	GT	35	(United States) Risi Competizione	(United States) Anthony Lazzaro (Germany) Ralf Kelleners	Ferrari 360 Modena GTC	P	119
11	GT	35	(United States) Risi Competizione	(United States) Anthony Lazzaro (Germany) Ralf Kelleners	Ferrari 3.6L V8	P	119
12	GT	66	(United States) New Century – The Racer's Group	(United States) Patrick Long (United States) Cort Wagner	Porsche 911 GT3-RSR	MI	119
12	GT	66	(United States) New Century – The Racer's Group	(United States) Patrick Long (United States) Cort Wagner	Porsche 3.6L Flat-6	MI	119
13	GT	44	(United States) Flying Lizard Motorsports	(United States) Lonnie Pechnik (United States) Seth Neiman	Porsche 911 GT3-RSR	MI	118
13	GT	44	(United States) Flying Lizard Motorsports	(United States) Lonnie Pechnik (United States) Seth Neiman	Porsche 3.6L Flat-6	MI	118
14	GT	79	(United States) J-3 Racing	(United States) Justin Jackson (United Kingdom) Tim Sugden	Porsche 911 GT3-RSR	MI	117
14	GT	79	(United States) J-3 Racing	(United States) Justin Jackson (United Kingdom) Tim Sugden	Porsche 3.6L Flat-6	MI	117
15	GT	50	(United States) Panoz Motor Sports	(United States) Gunnar Jeannette (Belgium) David Saelens	Panoz Esperante GT-LM	P	116
15	GT	50	(United States) Panoz Motor Sports	(United States) Gunnar Jeannette (Belgium) David Saelens	Ford (Elan) 5.0L V8	P	116
16	GT	43	(United States) BAM!	(United States) Leo Hindery (Germany) Sascha Maassen	Porsche 911 GT3-RSR	MI	116
16	GT	43	(United States) BAM!	(United States) Leo Hindery (Germany) Sascha Maassen	Porsche 3.6L Flat-6	MI	116
17	GTS	71	(United States) Carsport America	(United States) Tom Weickardt (France) Jean-Philippe Belloc	Dodge Viper GTS-R	P	116
17	GTS	71	(United States) Carsport America	(United States) Tom Weickardt (France) Jean-Philippe Belloc	Dodge 8.0L V10	P	116
18	GT	60	(United Kingdom) P.K. Sport	(Canada) Tony Burgess (United Kingdom) Piers Masarati	Porsche 911 GT3-RS	P	116
18	GT	60	(United Kingdom) P.K. Sport	(Canada) Tony Burgess (United Kingdom) Piers Masarati	Porsche 3.6L Flat-6	P	116
19	LMP2	10	(United States) Miracle Motorsports	(United States) Ian James (United States) James Gue (United States) John Macaluso	Lola B2K/40	Y	111
19	LMP2	10	(United States) Miracle Motorsports	(United States) Ian James (United States) James Gue (United States) John Macaluso	Nissan (AER) 3.0L V6	Y	111
20	GT	24	(United States) Alex Job Racing	(Germany) Marc Lieb (France) Romain Dumas	Porsche 911 GT3-RSR	MI	96
20	GT	24	(United States) Alex Job Racing	(Germany) Marc Lieb (France) Romain Dumas	Porsche 3.6L Flat-6	MI	96
21 DNF	LMP1	37	(United States) Intersport Racing	(United States) Jon Field (Sweden) Niclas Jönsson	Lola B01/60	G	17
21 DNF	LMP1	37	(United States) Intersport Racing	(United States) Jon Field (Sweden) Niclas Jönsson	Judd KV675 3.4L V8	G	17
FINAL RACE RESULTS

== Statistics ==
- Pole position – #16 Dyson Racing - 1:07.430
- Fastest lap – #16 Dyson Racing - 1:09.088
- Distance – 336.883 miles (542.161 km)
- Average speed – 122.065 mph (196.445 km/h)

American Le Mans Series
Previous race: 2004 Portland Grand Prix	2004 season	Next race: 2004 Road America 500
