= Jeff Bucknum =

American race car driver

- Nationality: (United States) American
- Born: July 12, 1966 (age 60) Glendale, California, U.S.
- Relatives: Ronnie Bucknum (father)

IRL IndyCar Series
- Years active: 2005-2006
- Teams: Dreyer & Reinbold Racing; Hemelgarn Racing; A. J. Foyt Enterprises
- Starts: 11
- Wins: 0
- Poles: 0
- Best finish: 20th in 2006

Previous series
- 2001-2005 1998-1999 1995-1996: American Le Mans Series; Star Mazda West; Barber Dodge Pro Series

Jeff Bucknum (born July 12, 1966, in Glendale, California) is an American race car driver. Jeff is the son of Formula One and Championship Car racer Ronnie Bucknum.

Bucknum competed in four Indy Racing League IndyCar Series races in 2005, including the Indianapolis 500, with a best finish of tenth at Infineon Raceway. He also drove a car in the LMP2 class of the American Le Mans Series where he placed second in series points in 2005.

In 2006, Bucknum teamed up with Ron Hemelgarn for his second Indy 500 appearance, in which he had the honor of being the month's first qualifier, but was involved in a second-lap crash and finished 32nd. It was announced on July 12, 2006, that Bucknum would drive for the remainder of the IndyCar season for Foyt Enterprises. He finished three of the six races that he drove for Foyt in 2006 and finished no better than 13th.

== Racing record ==
=== SCCA National Championship Runoffs ===
Year	Track	Car	Engine	Class	Finish	Start	Status
1998	Mid-Ohio	Star	Mazda	Formula Mazda	DSQ	1	Disqualified

=== 24 Hours of Le Mans results ===
Year	Team	Co-Drivers	Car	Class	Laps	Pos.	Class Pos.
2003	(United States) Team Bucknum Racing	(United States) Bryan Willman (United States) Chris McMurry	Pilbeam MP91-JPX	LMP675	27	DNF	DNF

=== Complete American Open Wheel Racing results ===
(key)

==== IRL IndyCar Series ====
Year	Team	Chassis	No.	Engine	1	2	3	4	5	6	7	8	9	10	11	12	13	14	15	16	17	Rank	Points	Ref
2005	Dreyer & Reinbold Racing	Dallara IR-05	44	Honda HI5R V8	HMS	PHX	STP	MOT; 22	INDY; 22	TXS	RIR	KAN	NSH	MIL	MIS	KTY	PPIR					25th	63	
2005	A. J. Foyt Enterprises	Dallara IR-05	14	Chevrolet Indy V8														SNM; 10	CHI	WGL; 11	FON	25th	63	
2006	Hemelgarn Racing	Dallara IR-05	92	Honda HI6R V8	HMS	STP	MOT	INDY; 32	WGL	TXS	RIR	KAN										20th	97	
2006	A. J. Foyt Enterprises	Dallara IR-05	14	Honda HI6R V8									NSH; 18	MIL; 13	MIS; 14	KTY; 13	SNM; 18	CHI; 17				20th	97	

==== Indy 500 ====
Year	Chassis	Engine	Start	Finish	Team
2005	Dallara	Honda	21	22	D & R
2006	Dallara	Honda	22	32	Hemelgarn
