= Craig Stanton =

American racing driver

Craig George Stanton (born October 31, 1960, in Hollywood, California) is an American race car driver and bicyclist. Stanton won the Grand-Am Koni Challenge championship in 2004 in the GS class, and then won the Grand-Am Rolex Series championship in 2005 in the GT class. Stanton also works as a driving coach.

As of 2013, Stanton is driving various Porsches in Grand-Am, ALMS, and World-Challenge this year, participating in all major North American tin-top pro series. Additionally, Stanton will continue coaching amateur and professional drivers.

== Early career ==
Stanton started his racing career by spending ten years on a motocross bike. He went on to start racing cars in 1986, with the help of his brother, Mark. During Stanton's first full season as an amateur, he drove in 49 races. During his second season, he drove in 41 races. The two brothers won nine championships in amateur road racing before Stanton made the transition to become a professional.

== Road racing ==
In 2004, Stanton won his first championship as a professional. Driving for TheRaceSite.com, Stanton won the GS class of the Koni Challenge series. During that year, Stanton had six class wins in his Porsche 996. That year, Stanton was also named the 2004 Rising Star.

To follow up his first professional championship, Stanton moved on to the Grand-Am Rolex Sportscar series. There, he won a championship in a GT class Porsche GT3 Cup car with Synergy Racing.

Most recently, Stanton raced a Porsche Carrera Cup car in 2010 and 2011 in the Grand-Am Rolex Sportscar series with Magnus Racing. Together with team owner John Potter, the drivers captured four podium finishes during the two years. Stanton also raced with Potter in 2008 and 2009 as part of the TRG team in a Porsche GT3 Cup car.

== Other racing ==
In addition to driving Porsche Carrera Cup cars, Stanton has also competed in USAC and NASCAR. Stanton has raced in the SCORE off-road series, and is particularly fond of off-road racing.

== Personal life ==
Stanton was born on October 31, 1960, in Hollywood, California. While he was growing up, Stanton's mom owned a gift shop in Glendale, and his dad taught auto shop, math, and electronics at the high school level. Stanton took advantage of the California landscape and started surfing and skiing by the time he was ten years old.

Stanton has one brother, Mark, who is two years younger. Mark supported Stanton during his amateur racing career, and the two often went to the track together. Mark later went on to become a pyrotechnician and worked in special effects for movie studios. Stanton and Mark recently began working together on developing the new Evosport Engineering race car.

Stanton is an Eagle Scout, and has dyslexia. In high school, Stanton raced bicycles, and still competes in one 24-hour mountain bike race each year (usually either the 24 Hours of Moab or 24 Hours of Temecula).
