= Leo Hindery =

American businessman (1947–2025)

Leo Hindery Jr.
- Born: October 31, 1947; Springfield, Illinois, U.S.
- Died: September 2025 (aged 77); Zurich, Switzerland
- Education: Seattle University; Stanford University
- Occupations: InterMedia Partners, Trine Acquisition Corp.
- Known for: Businessman, author, political activist, philanthropist
- Spouses: Mary Hermann (divorced); Deborah Bailey (divorced); Patti Wheeler (m. 2005)
- Children: 1

Leo Joseph Hindery Jr. (October 31, 1947 – September 17 or 18, 2025) was an American businessman, fund manager, author, and political activist.

== Background ==
Hindery was born in Springfield, Illinois, on October 31, 1947, and was brought up in Tacoma, Washington. He earned a bachelor's degree from Seattle University and an MBA from Stanford University.

== Career ==
Hindery began his business career San Francisco. In 1988, he founded and ran as managing partner InterMedia Partners, a series of media industry investment funds. In November 1999, Hindery was named chairman and CEO of GlobalCenter Inc., a major Internet services company which fourteen months later merged into Exodus Communications, Inc.

He was chairman and CEO of Trine Acquisition Corp., a NYSE-listed SPAC which went public in March 2019 and went effective with its merger with Desktop Metal, Inc. (NYSE: DM) in early 2021, and of a follow-on NYSE-listed SPAC under the Trine name that went public in the third quarter of 2021 and returned funds to its public investors in the second quarter of 2023.

Following this merger, until October 2004, he was the founding chairman and CEO of The YES Network, the regional television home of the New York Yankees, after which he reconstituted and ran InterMedia Partners until the founding of Trine.

In February 1997 he was named president and CEO of Tele-Communications, Inc. (TCI), then the world's largest cable television system operator. In March 1999, TCI merged into AT&T Corporation and Hindery became president and CEO of AT&T Broadband.

He was a member of the Council on Foreign Relations. He was a member of the Hall of Fame of the Minority Media & Telecommunications Council, co-chair of the Task Force on Jobs Creation and was the founder of Jobs First 2012. He was also a director of Hemisphere Media Group, Inc.

Hindery was a member of the Cable Industry Hall of Fame, was formerly chairman of the National Cable Television Association and of C-SPAN, and has been recognized as one of the cable industry's "25 Most Influential Executives Over the Past 25 Years".

He was co-founder along with Russian Federation Council Chairman Sergey Mironov of Transatlantic Partners Against AIDS (TPAA) and recipient of the Asia Society's Founders Award for his efforts in the international fight against AIDS, tuberculosis, and malaria. From 2005 through 2007, Hindery was Democrat-appointed vice chair of the Presidential & Congressional HELP Commission which made recommendations to Congress for the reform of U.S. foreign assistance.

== Personal life and death ==
=== Family ===
Hindery's first two marriages, to Mary Hermann and Deborah Bailey, ended in divorce. He had a daughter from his second marriage. In 2005, he married Patti Wheeler, with whom he lived in Cornelius, North Carolina.

=== Motorsports ===
Hindery was the chairman of Port Imperial Racing Associates, the organizer of the proposed Grand Prix of America Formula 1 race to be held at the Port Imperial Street Circuit in New Jersey, United States. The race was included in the Formula 1 calendar for 2013, 2014 and 2015 but was ultimately cancelled due to a lack of funding.

A retired race car driver, Hindery's racing résumé included a Class win at the 24 Hours of Le Mans (24 Heures du Mans) in 2005 and a Class second-place finish in 2003. He is a member of the NASCAR Winston West Hall of Fame.

=== Politics ===
Hindery was active in the Democratic Party. In 2004, his name was floated as a possible successor to Terry McAuliffe as head of the Democratic National Committee. He was Senior Economic Policy Advisor for presidential candidate John Edwards from December 2006 until February 2008. In 2008 Hindery was an economic and trade advisor to then-presidential candidate Barack Obama, and in 2012 was an economic policy surrogate for President Obama. On the withdrawal of Bill Richardson as nominee for Secretary of Commerce on January 4, 2009, it was suggested that he might be a suitable replacement.

Hindery endorsed Democratic candidate Hillary Clinton in the 2016 U.S. presidential election.

=== Death ===
Hindery suffered from chronic pain in later years, and died by assisted suicide in Zurich, Switzerland, in September 2025, at the age of 77. Hindery’s chronic pain was thought to be caused by many unsuccessful surgeries.

== 24 Hours of Le Mans results ==
Year	Team	Co-Drivers	Car	Class	Laps	Pos.	Class Pos.
2002	(United States) Orbit Racing	(United States) Peter Baron (United States) Anthony Kester	Porsche 911 GT3-RS	GT	165	DNF	DNF
2003	(United States) Orbit Racing	(United States) Peter Baron (Germany) Marc Lieb	Porsche 911 GT3-RS	GT	314	17th	2nd
2004	(United States) Orbit Racing (United States) BAM!	(Germany) Marc Lieb (Germany) Mike Rockenfeller	Porsche 911 GT3-RS	GT	223	DNF	DNF
2005	(United States) Alex Job Racing (United States) BAM! Motorsport	(Germany) Marc Lieb (Germany) Mike Rockenfeller	Porsche 911 GT3-RSR	GT2	332	10th	1st

== Awards ==
- Hindery was inducted in the West Coast Stock Car Hall of Fame in 2021.

== Books ==
- It Takes a CEO ISBN 0-7432-6985-3
- The Biggest Game of All ISBN 0-7432-2900-2.
