= 2003 Petit Le Mans =

Sportscar endurance race in Georgia, US

The Track map of Road Atlanta

The 2003 Petit Le Mans was the ninth and final race in the 2003 American Le Mans Series season and was held at Road Atlanta. It took place on October 18, 2003.

== Official results ==
Class winners in bold. Cars failing to complete 70% of winner's distance marked as Not Classified (NC).

| Pos | Class | No | Team | Drivers | Chassis | Tyre | Laps |
| Pos | Class | No | Team | Drivers | Engine | Tyre | Laps |
|---|---|---|---|---|---|---|---|
| 1 | **LMP900** | **38** | **(United States) ADT Champion Racing** | **(Finland) JJ Lehto (United Kingdom) Johnny Herbert** | **Audi R8** | M | **394** |
| 1 | **LMP900** | **38** | **(United States) ADT Champion Racing** | **(Finland) JJ Lehto (United Kingdom) Johnny Herbert** | **Audi 3.6 L Turbo V8** | M | **394** |
| 2 | LMP900 | 10 | (United States) JML Team Panoz | (Monaco) Olivier Beretta (Belgium) David Saelens (Italy) Max Papis | Panoz LMP01 Evo | M | 386 |
| 2 | LMP900 | 10 | (United States) JML Team Panoz | (Monaco) Olivier Beretta (Belgium) David Saelens (Italy) Max Papis | Élan 6L8 6.0 L V8 | M | 386 |
| 3 | LMP900 | 1 | (Germany) Infineon Team Joest | (Germany) Frank Biela (Germany) Marco Werner | Audi R8 | M | 385 |
| 3 | LMP900 | 1 | (Germany) Infineon Team Joest | (Germany) Frank Biela (Germany) Marco Werner | Audi 3.6 L Turbo V8 | M | 385 |
| 4 | LMP900 | 11 | (United States) JML Team Panoz | (Canada) Scott Maxwell (United States) Gunnar Jeannette (Switzerland) Benjamin Leuenberger | Panoz LMP01 Evo | M | 379 |
| 4 | LMP900 | 11 | (United States) JML Team Panoz | (Canada) Scott Maxwell (United States) Gunnar Jeannette (Switzerland) Benjamin Leuenberger | Élan 6L8 6.0L V8 | M | 379 |
| 5 | **GTS** | **88** | **(United Kingdom) Prodrive** | **(Switzerland) Alain Menu (Netherlands) Peter Kox (Czech Republic) Tomáš Enge** | **Ferrari 550-GTS Maranello** | M | **375** |
| 5 | **GTS** | **88** | **(United Kingdom) Prodrive** | **(Switzerland) Alain Menu (Netherlands) Peter Kox (Czech Republic) Tomáš Enge** | **Ferrari 5.9 L V12** | M | **375** |
| 6 | GTS | 80 | (United Kingdom) Prodrive | (Australia) David Brabham (Denmark) Jan Magnussen (United Kingdom) Anthony Davidson | Ferrari 550-GTS Maranello | M | 375 |
| 6 | GTS | 80 | (United Kingdom) Prodrive | (Australia) David Brabham (Denmark) Jan Magnussen (United Kingdom) Anthony Davidson | Ferrari 5.9 L V12 | M | 375 |
| 7 | GTS | 4 | (United States) Corvette Racing | (United Kingdom) Oliver Gavin (United States) Kelly Collins (United States) Andy Pilgrim | Chevrolet Corvette C5-R | G | 366 |
| 7 | GTS | 4 | (United States) Corvette Racing | (United Kingdom) Oliver Gavin (United States) Kelly Collins (United States) Andy Pilgrim | Chevrolet LS7r 7.0 L V8 | G | 366 |
| 8 | **GT** | **24** | **(United States) Alex Job Racing** | **(Germany) Timo Bernhard (Germany) Jörg Bergmeister (France) Romain Dumas** | **Porsche 911 GT3-RS** | M | **360** |
| 8 | **GT** | **24** | **(United States) Alex Job Racing** | **(Germany) Timo Bernhard (Germany) Jörg Bergmeister (France) Romain Dumas** | **Porsche 3.6 L Flat-6** | M | **360** |
| 9 | GT | 23 | (United States) Alex Job Racing | (Germany) Sascha Maassen (Germany) Lucas Luhr | Porsche 911 GT3-RS | M | 360 |
| 9 | GT | 23 | (United States) Alex Job Racing | (Germany) Sascha Maassen (Germany) Lucas Luhr | Porsche 3.6 L Flat-6 | M | 360 |
| 10 | LMP900 | 12 | (United States) American Spirit Racing | (United States) Mike Lewis (United States) Tomy Drissi (Canada) Melanie Paterson | Riley & Scott Mk III C | D | 360 |
| 10 | LMP900 | 12 | (United States) American Spirit Racing | (United States) Mike Lewis (United States) Tomy Drissi (Canada) Melanie Paterson | Lincoln 5.0 L V8 | D | 360 |
| 11 | GTS | 08 | (United Kingdom) Prodrive | (Switzerland) Frédéric Dor (Netherlands) Jan Lammers (France) Jérôme Policand | Ferrari 550-GTS Maranello | M | 357 |
| 11 | GTS | 08 | (United Kingdom) Prodrive | (Switzerland) Frédéric Dor (Netherlands) Jan Lammers (France) Jérôme Policand | Ferrari 5.9 L V12 | M | 357 |
| 12 | **LMP675** | **37** | **(United States) Intersport Racing** | **(United States) Jon Field (United States) Duncan Dayton (United States) Larry Connor** | **Lola B01/60** | G | **357** |
| 12 | **LMP675** | **37** | **(United States) Intersport Racing** | **(United States) Jon Field (United States) Duncan Dayton (United States) Larry Connor** | **Judd KV675 3.4 L V8** | G | **357** |
| 13 | GT | 35 | (United States) Risi Competizione | (Germany) Ralf Kelleners (United States) Anthony Lazzaro | Ferrari 360 Modena GT | M | 355 |
| 13 | GT | 35 | (United States) Risi Competizione | (Germany) Ralf Kelleners (United States) Anthony Lazzaro | Ferrari 3.6 L V8 | M | 355 |
| 14 | GTS | 3 | (United States) Corvette Racing | (Canada) Ron Fellows (United States) Johnny O'Connell (France) Franck Fréon | Chevrolet Corvette C5-R | G | 353 |
| 14 | GTS | 3 | (United States) Corvette Racing | (Canada) Ron Fellows (United States) Johnny O'Connell (France) Franck Fréon | Chevrolet 7.0 L V8 | G | 353 |
| 15 | GT | 66 | (United States) The Racer's Group | (United States) Kevin Buckler (United States) Cort Wagner (United States) Patrick Long | Porsche 911 GT3-RS | M | 352 |
| 15 | GT | 66 | (United States) The Racer's Group | (United States) Kevin Buckler (United States) Cort Wagner (United States) Patrick Long | Porsche 3.6 L Flat-6 | M | 352 |
| 16 | GT | 79 | (United States) J3 Racing | (United States) Justin Jackson (United States) David Murray (United States) Brian Cunningham | Porsche 911 GT3-RS | M | 351 |
| 16 | GT | 79 | (United States) J3 Racing | (United States) Justin Jackson (United States) David Murray (United States) Brian Cunningham | Porsche 3.6 L Flat-6 | M | 351 |
| 17 | GT | 6 | (United States) Yokohama/ADVAN (United States) Prototype Technology Group (PTG) | (United States) Bill Auberlen (United States) Boris Said (Germany) Hans-Joachim Stuck | BMW M3 GTR | Y | 350 |
| 17 | GT | 6 | (United States) Yokohama/ADVAN (United States) Prototype Technology Group (PTG) | (United States) Bill Auberlen (United States) Boris Said (Germany) Hans-Joachim Stuck | BMW 3.2 L I6 | Y | 350 |
| 18 | GT | 63 | (United States) ACEMCO Motorsports | (United States) Terry Borcheller (United States) Darren Law (United States) Shane Lewis | Ferrari 360 Modena GT | Y | 350 |
| 18 | GT | 63 | (United States) ACEMCO Motorsports | (United States) Terry Borcheller (United States) Darren Law (United States) Shane Lewis | Ferrari 3.6 L V8 | Y | 350 |
| 19 | GT | 60 | (United Kingdom) PK Sport | (United Kingdom) Robin Liddell (Italy) Alex Caffi (United Kingdom) David Warnock | Porsche 911 GT3-RS | P | 344 |
| 19 | GT | 60 | (United Kingdom) PK Sport | (United Kingdom) Robin Liddell (Italy) Alex Caffi (United Kingdom) David Warnock | Porsche 3.6 L Flat-6 | P | 344 |
| 20 | GT | 42 | (United States) Orbit Racing | (United States) Randy Pobst (United States) Joe Policastro (United States) Joe Policastro Jr. | Porsche 911 GT3-RS | M | 342 |
| 20 | GT | 42 | (United States) Orbit Racing | (United States) Randy Pobst (United States) Joe Policastro (United States) Joe Policastro Jr. | Porsche 3.6 L Flat-6 | M | 342 |
| 21 | LMP675 | 20 | (United States) Dyson Racing | (United States) Chris Dyson (Belgium) Didier de Radigues (United States) Chad Block | MG-Lola EX257 | M | 320 |
| 21 | LMP675 | 20 | (United States) Dyson Racing | (United States) Chris Dyson (Belgium) Didier de Radigues (United States) Chad Block | MG (AER) XP20 2.0 L Turbo I4 | M | 320 |
| 22 | LMP675 | 64 | (United States) Downing Atlanta, Inc. | (United States) Jim Downing (Japan) Yojiro Terada (United States) Howard Katz | WR LM2001 | D | 318 |
| 22 | LMP675 | 64 | (United States) Downing Atlanta, Inc. | (United States) Jim Downing (Japan) Yojiro Terada (United States) Howard Katz | Mazda R26B 4-rotor | D | 318 |
| 23 DNF | GT | 43 | (United States) Orbit Racing | (United States) Leo Hindery (United States) Peter Baron (Germany) Mike Rockenfeller | Porsche 911 GT3-RS | M | 313 |
| 23 DNF | GT | 43 | (United States) Orbit Racing | (United States) Leo Hindery (United States) Peter Baron (Germany) Mike Rockenfeller | Porsche 3.6 L Flat-6 | M | 313 |
| 24 | GT | 61 | (United States) PK Sport | (United States) Vic Rice (United States) John Groom (United States) Romeo Kapudija (United States) Ron Attapatu | Porsche 911 GT3-RS | P | 300 |
| 24 | GT | 61 | (United States) PK Sport | (United States) Vic Rice (United States) John Groom (United States) Romeo Kapudija (United States) Ron Attapatu | Porsche 3.6 L Flat-6 | P | 300 |
| 25 DNF | LMP675 | 18 | (United States) Essex Racing | (United States) Andrew Davis (United States) Jason Workman (United States) Scott Bradley | Lola B2K/40 | P | 286 |
| 25 DNF | LMP675 | 18 | (United States) Essex Racing | (United States) Andrew Davis (United States) Jason Workman (United States) Scott Bradley | Nissan (AER) VQL 3.0 L V6 | P | 286 |
| 26 | GT | 89 | (United States) Inline Cunningham Racing | (Brazil) Oswaldo Negri, Jr. (United States) Burt Frisselle | Porsche 911 GT3-RS | Y | 280 |
| 26 | GT | 89 | (United States) Inline Cunningham Racing | (Brazil) Oswaldo Negri, Jr. (United States) Burt Frisselle | Porsche 3.6 L Flat-6 | Y | 280 |
| 27 DNF | GTS | 71 | (United States) Carsport America | (United States) Tom Wieckardt (France) Jean-Philippe Belloc (France) Éric Cayrolle | Dodge Viper GTS-R | P | 239 |
| 27 DNF | GTS | 71 | (United States) Carsport America | (United States) Tom Wieckardt (France) Jean-Philippe Belloc (France) Éric Cayrolle | Dodge 8.0 L V10 | P | 239 |
| 28 DNF | GT | 68 | (United States) The Racer's Group | (United States) Chris Gleason (Germany) Pierre Ehret (United States) Marc Bunting | Porsche 911 GT3-RS | M | 217 |
| 28 DNF | GT | 68 | (United States) The Racer's Group | (United States) Chris Gleason (Germany) Pierre Ehret (United States) Marc Bunting | Porsche 3.6 L Flat-6 | M | 217 |
| 29 DNF | LMP675 | 56 | (United States) Team Bucknum Racing | (United States) Bryan Willman (United States) Chris McMurry (United States) Alan Rudolph | Pilbeam MP91 | D | 194 |
| 29 DNF | LMP675 | 56 | (United States) Team Bucknum Racing | (United States) Bryan Willman (United States) Chris McMurry (United States) Alan Rudolph | Willman 6 (JPX) 3.4 L V6 | D | 194 |
| 30 DNF | GT | 03 | (United States) Hyper Sport Competition | (United States) Joe Foster (United States) Brad Nyberg (United States) Rick Skelton | Panoz Esperante GT-LM | P | 186 |
| 30 DNF | GT | 03 | (United States) Hyper Sport Competition | (United States) Joe Foster (United States) Brad Nyberg (United States) Rick Skelton | Ford (Elan) 5.0 L V8 | P | 186 |
| 31 DNF | GT | 52 | (Germany) Seikel Motorsport | (Canada) Tony Burgess (United States) Philip Collin (New Zealand) Andrew Bagnall | Porsche 911 GT3-RS | Y | 159 |
| 31 DNF | GT | 52 | (Germany) Seikel Motorsport | (Canada) Tony Burgess (United States) Philip Collin (New Zealand) Andrew Bagnall | Porsche 3.6 L Flat-6 | Y | 159 |
| 32 DNF | GT | 67 | (United States) The Racer's Group | (United States) Tom Nastasi (United States) Jeff Zwart | Porsche 911 GT3-RS | M | 129 |
| 32 DNF | GT | 67 | (United States) The Racer's Group | (United States) Tom Nastasi (United States) Jeff Zwart | Porsche 3.6 L Flat-6 | M | 129 |
| 33 DNF | LMP900 | 30 | (United States) Intersport Racing | (United States) Clint Field (United States) Michael Durand (United States) Larry Oberto | Riley & Scott Mk III C | D | 73 |
| 33 DNF | LMP900 | 30 | (United States) Intersport Racing | (United States) Clint Field (United States) Michael Durand (United States) Larry Oberto | Élan 6L8 6.0 L V8 | D | 73 |
| 34 DNF | GT | 31 | (United States) Petersen Motorsports (United States) White Lightning Racing | (United Kingdom) Johnny Mowlem (United States) Craig Stanton (United States) Michael Petersen | Porsche 911 GT3-RS | M | 35 |
| 34 DNF | GT | 31 | (United States) Petersen Motorsports (United States) White Lightning Racing | (United Kingdom) Johnny Mowlem (United States) Craig Stanton (United States) Michael Petersen | Porsche 3.6 L Flat-6 | M | 35 |
| 35 DNF | GTS | 0 | (Italy) Team Olive Garden | (Italy) Mimmo Schiattarella (Italy) Emanuele Naspetti (Switzerland) Joël Camathias | Ferrari 550 Maranello | M | 28 |
| 35 DNF | GTS | 0 | (Italy) Team Olive Garden | (Italy) Mimmo Schiattarella (Italy) Emanuele Naspetti (Switzerland) Joël Camathias | Ferrari 6.0 L V12 | M | 28 |
| 36 DNF | LMP675 | 16 | (United States) Dyson Racing | (United Kingdom) James Weaver (United Kingdom) Andy Wallace (United States) Butch Leitzinger | MG-Lola EX257 | M | 6 |
| 36 DNF | LMP675 | 16 | (United States) Dyson Racing | (United Kingdom) James Weaver (United Kingdom) Andy Wallace (United States) Butch Leitzinger | MG (AER) XP20 2.0 L Turbo I4 | M | 6 |
| DNS | GT | 28 | (United States) JMB Racing USA | (France) Stéphane Grégoire (United States) Stephen Earle (United States) Phillip Shearer | Ferrari 360 Modena GT | P | - |
| DNS | GT | 28 | (United States) JMB Racing USA | (France) Stéphane Grégoire (United States) Stephen Earle (United States) Phillip Shearer | Ferrari 3.6 L V8 | P | - |

== Statistics ==
- Pole Position - #1 Infineon Team Joest - 1:11.738
- Fastest Lap - #38 Champion Racing - 1:12.624
- Distance - 1,000.76 miles (1,610.57 km)
- Average Speed - 105.126 mph (169.184 km/h)

American Le Mans Series
| Previous race: 2003 Grand Prix Americas | 2003 season | Next race: none |
