= New England 200 =

New England 200 may refer to:

- Lakes Region 200, a NASCAR Nationwide Series race held at New Hampshire Motor Speedway
- UNOH 175, a NASCAR Camping World Truck Series race held at New Hampshire Motor Speedway in 2001 and 2002
- New Hampshire Indy 225, an Indycar Series race held at New Hampshire Motor Speedway
