= 2003 Grand Prix Americas (ALMS) =

Bayfront Park circuit (2003)

The 2003 Grand Prix Americas was the eighth race of the 2003 American Le Mans Series season. It took place on a temporary street circuit in Miami, Florida on September 27, 2003.

The race was scheduled for 2 hours and 45 minutes, but was ended several minutes early due to heavy rains causing multiple accidents.

== Official results ==
Class winners in bold. Cars failing to complete 75% of winner's distance marked as Not Classified (NC).

Pos	Class	No	Team	Drivers	Chassis	Tyre	Laps
Pos	Class	No	Team	Drivers	Engine	Tyre	Laps
1	**LMP900**	**38**	**(United States) ADT Champion Racing**	**(United Kingdom) Johnny Herbert (Finland) JJ Lehto**	**Audi R8**	MI	**157**
1	**LMP900**	**38**	**(United States) ADT Champion Racing**	**(United Kingdom) Johnny Herbert (Finland) JJ Lehto**	**Audi 3.6L Turbo V8**	MI	**157**
2	LMP900	1	(Germany) Infineon Team Joest	(Germany) Marco Werner (Germany) Frank Biela	Audi R8	MI	157
2	LMP900	1	(Germany) Infineon Team Joest	(Germany) Marco Werner (Germany) Frank Biela	Audi 3.6L Turbo V8	MI	157
3	LMP900	10	(United States) JML Team Panoz	(Monaco) Olivier Beretta (Belgium) David Saelens	Panoz LMP01 Evo	MI	155
3	LMP900	10	(United States) JML Team Panoz	(Monaco) Olivier Beretta (Belgium) David Saelens	Élan 6L8 6.0L V8	MI	155
4	**GTS**	**80**	**(United Kingdom) Prodrive**	**(Australia) David Brabham (United Kingdom) Darren Turner**	**Ferrari 550-GTS Maranello**	MI	**154**
4	**GTS**	**80**	**(United Kingdom) Prodrive**	**(Australia) David Brabham (United Kingdom) Darren Turner**	**Ferrari 5.9L V12**	MI	**154**
5	GTS	88	(United Kingdom) Prodrive	(Czech Republic) Tomáš Enge (Netherlands) Peter Kox	Ferrari 550-GTS Maranello	MI	154
5	GTS	88	(United Kingdom) Prodrive	(Czech Republic) Tomáš Enge (Netherlands) Peter Kox	Ferrari 5.9L V12	MI	154
6	**LMP675**	**20**	**(United States) Dyson Racing**	**(United States) Chris Dyson (United Kingdom) Andy Wallace**	**MG-Lola EX257**	G	**152**
6	**LMP675**	**20**	**(United States) Dyson Racing**	**(United States) Chris Dyson (United Kingdom) Andy Wallace**	**MG (AER) XP20 2.0L Turbo I4**	G	**152**
7	**GT**	**23**	**(United States) Alex Job Racing**	**(Germany) Lucas Luhr (Germany) Sascha Maassen**	**Porsche 911 GT3-RS**	MI	**151**
7	**GT**	**23**	**(United States) Alex Job Racing**	**(Germany) Lucas Luhr (Germany) Sascha Maassen**	**Porsche 3.6L Flat-6**	MI	**151**
8	LMP675	16	(United States) Dyson Racing	(United States) Butch Leitzinger (United Kingdom) James Weaver	MG-Lola EX257	G	150
8	LMP675	16	(United States) Dyson Racing	(United States) Butch Leitzinger (United Kingdom) James Weaver	MG (AER) XP20 2.0L Turbo I4	G	150
9	GT	35	(United States) Risi Competizione	(United States) Anthony Lazzaro (Germany) Ralf Kelleners	Ferrari 360 Modena GTC	MI	150
9	GT	35	(United States) Risi Competizione	(United States) Anthony Lazzaro (Germany) Ralf Kelleners	Ferrari 3.6L V8	MI	150
10	GT	60	(United Kingdom) P.K. Sport	(United Kingdom) Robin Liddell (Italy) Alex Caffi	Porsche 911 GT3-RS	P	149
10	GT	60	(United Kingdom) P.K. Sport	(United Kingdom) Robin Liddell (Italy) Alex Caffi	Porsche 3.6L Flat-6	P	149
11	LMP900	30	(United States) Intersport Racing	(United States) Clint Field (United States) Mike Durand	Riley & Scott Mk III C	D	149
11	LMP900	30	(United States) Intersport Racing	(United States) Clint Field (United States) Mike Durand	Élan 6L8 6.0L V8	D	149
12	LMP900	12	(United States) American Spirit Racing	(United States) Michael Lewis (United States) Tomy Drissi	Riley & Scott Mk III C	D	148
12	LMP900	12	(United States) American Spirit Racing	(United States) Michael Lewis (United States) Tomy Drissi	Lincoln (Élan) 5.0L V8	D	148
13	GT	31	(United States) Petersen Motorsports (United States) White Lightning Racing	(United States) Craig Stanton (United Kingdom) Johnny Mowlem	Porsche 911 GT3-RS	MI	148
13	GT	31	(United States) Petersen Motorsports (United States) White Lightning Racing	(United States) Craig Stanton (United Kingdom) Johnny Mowlem	Porsche 3.6L Flat-6	MI	148
14	GT	28	(United States) JMB Racing USA	(France) Stéphane Grégoire (Chile) Eliseo Salazar	Ferrari 360 Modena GTC	P	146
14	GT	28	(United States) JMB Racing USA	(France) Stéphane Grégoire (Chile) Eliseo Salazar	Ferrari 3.6L V8	P	146
15	GTS	0	(Italy) Team Olive Garden	(Italy) Emanuele Naspetti (Italy) Mimmo Schiattarella	Ferrari 550 Maranello	P	145
15	GTS	0	(Italy) Team Olive Garden	(Italy) Emanuele Naspetti (Italy) Mimmo Schiattarella	Ferrari 6.0L V12	P	145
16 DNF	GT	24	(United States) Alex Job Racing	(Germany) Jörg Bergmeister (Germany) Timo Bernhard	Porsche 911 GT3-RS	MI	143
16 DNF	GT	24	(United States) Alex Job Racing	(Germany) Jörg Bergmeister (Germany) Timo Bernhard	Porsche 3.6L Flat-6	MI	143
17	GT	33	(United States) ZIP Racing	(United States) Andy Lally (United States) Spencer Pumpelly (United States) Romeo Kapudija	Porsche 911 GT3-RS	D	143
17	GT	33	(United States) ZIP Racing	(United States) Andy Lally (United States) Spencer Pumpelly (United States) Romeo Kapudija	Porsche 3.6L Flat-6	D	143
18	GT	63	(United States) ACEMCO Motorsports	(United States) Terry Borcheller (United States) Shane Lewis	Ferrari 360 Modena GTC	Y	143
18	GT	63	(United States) ACEMCO Motorsports	(United States) Terry Borcheller (United States) Shane Lewis	Ferrari 3.6L V8	Y	143
19	LMP675	18	(United States) Essex Racing	(United States) Scott Bradley (United States) Jason Workman	Lola B2K/40	P	142
19	LMP675	18	(United States) Essex Racing	(United States) Scott Bradley (United States) Jason Workman	Nissan (AER) VQL 3.0L V6	P	142
20	LMP675	37	(United States) Intersport Racing	(United States) Jon Field (United States) Duncan Dayton	MG-Lola EX257	G	142
20	LMP675	37	(United States) Intersport Racing	(United States) Jon Field (United States) Duncan Dayton	MG (AER) XP20 2.0L Turbo I4	G	142
21	GT	66	(United States) The Racer's Group	(United States) Kevin Buckler (United States) Cort Wagner	Porsche 911 GT3-RS	MI	142
21	GT	66	(United States) The Racer's Group	(United States) Kevin Buckler (United States) Cort Wagner	Porsche 3.6L Flat-6	MI	142
22	GT	42	(United States) Orbit Racing	(United States) Joe Policastro (United States) Joe Policastro Jr.	Porsche 911 GT3-RS	MI	138
22	GT	42	(United States) Orbit Racing	(United States) Joe Policastro (United States) Joe Policastro Jr.	Porsche 3.6L Flat-6	MI	138
23	GT	67	(United States) The Racer's Group	(United States) Jeff Zwart (Germany) Pierre Ehret	Porsche 911 GT3-RS	MI	136
23	GT	67	(United States) The Racer's Group	(United States) Jeff Zwart (Germany) Pierre Ehret	Porsche 3.6L Flat-6	MI	136
24 DNF	LMP900	11	(United States) JML Team Panoz	(Canada) Scott Maxwell (United States) Gunnar Jeannette	Panoz LMP01 Evo	MI	135
24 DNF	LMP900	11	(United States) JML Team Panoz	(Canada) Scott Maxwell (United States) Gunnar Jeannette	Élan 6L8 6.0L V8	MI	135
25 DNF	GT	29	(United States) JMB Racing USA	(United States) Stephen Earle (United States) Mark Neuhaus	Ferrari 360 Modena GTC	P	133
25 DNF	GT	29	(United States) JMB Racing USA	(United States) Stephen Earle (United States) Mark Neuhaus	Ferrari 3.6L V8	P	133
26	GT	68	(United States) The Racer's Group	(United States) Marc Bunting (United States) Chris Gleason	Porsche 911 GT3-RS	MI	125
26	GT	68	(United States) The Racer's Group	(United States) Marc Bunting (United States) Chris Gleason	Porsche 3.6L Flat-6	MI	125
27	GTS	3	(United States) Corvette Racing	(Canada) Ron Fellows (United States) Johnny O'Connell	Chevrolet Corvette C5-R	G	122
27	GTS	3	(United States) Corvette Racing	(Canada) Ron Fellows (United States) Johnny O'Connell	Chevrolet 7.0L V8	G	122
28 NC	GT	79	(United States) J3 Racing	(United States) David Murry (United States) Justin Jackson	Porsche 911 GT3-RS	MI	113
28 NC	GT	79	(United States) J3 Racing	(United States) David Murry (United States) Justin Jackson	Porsche 3.6L Flat-6	MI	113
29 DNF	GT	61	(United Kingdom) P.K. Sport	(United Kingdom) David Warnock (United States) Ron Atapattu	Porsche 911 GT3-R	P	107
29 DNF	GT	61	(United Kingdom) P.K. Sport	(United Kingdom) David Warnock (United States) Ron Atapattu	Porsche 3.6L Flat-6	P	107
30 DNF	GT	03	(United States) Hyper Sport	(United States) Rick Skelton (United States) Brad Nyberg	Panoz Esperante GT-LM	P	68
30 DNF	GT	03	(United States) Hyper Sport	(United States) Rick Skelton (United States) Brad Nyberg	Élan 5.0L V8	P	68
31 DNF	GTS	2	(Germany) Konrad Motorsport	(Austria) Franz Konrad (United Kingdom) Richard Nearn	Saleen S7-R	D	62
31 DNF	GTS	2	(Germany) Konrad Motorsport	(Austria) Franz Konrad (United Kingdom) Richard Nearn	Ford 7.0L V8	D	62
32 DNF	GT	40	(United States) Alegra Motorsports	(United States) Bill Auberlen (Sweden) Niclas Jönsson	BMW M3	Y	58
32 DNF	GT	40	(United States) Alegra Motorsports	(United States) Bill Auberlen (Sweden) Niclas Jönsson	BMW 3.2L I6	Y	58
33 DNF	GT	43	(United States) Orbit Racing	(Germany) Marc Lieb (United States) Peter Baron	Porsche 911 GT3-RS	MI	41
33 DNF	GT	43	(United States) Orbit Racing	(Germany) Marc Lieb (United States) Peter Baron	Porsche 3.6L Flat-6	MI	41
34 DNF	LMP675	56	(United States) Team Bucknum Racing	(United States) Jeff Bucknum (United States) Bryan Willman (United States) Chris McMurry	Pilbeam MP91	D	40
34 DNF	LMP675	56	(United States) Team Bucknum Racing	(United States) Jeff Bucknum (United States) Bryan Willman (United States) Chris McMurry	Willman (JPX) 3.4L V6	D	40
35 DNF	GTS	71	(United States) Carsport America	(United States) Tom Weickardt (France) Jean-Philippe Belloc	Dodge Viper GTS-R	P	16
35 DNF	GTS	71	(United States) Carsport America	(United States) Tom Weickardt (France) Jean-Philippe Belloc	Dodge 8.0L V10	P	16
36 DNF	GT	41	(United States) Alegra Motorsports	(United States) Ross Bluestein (Puerto Rico) Carlos DeQuesada	BMW M3	Y	15
36 DNF	GT	41	(United States) Alegra Motorsports	(United States) Ross Bluestein (Puerto Rico) Carlos DeQuesada	BMW 3.2L I6	Y	15
DNS	GTS	4	(United States) Corvette Racing	(United States) Kelly Collins (United Kingdom) Oliver Gavin	Chevrolet Corvette C5-R	G	-
DNS	GTS	4	(United States) Corvette Racing	(United States) Kelly Collins (United Kingdom) Oliver Gavin	Chevrolet 7.0L V8	G	-

== Statistics ==
- Pole Position - #38 ADT Champion Racing - 0:47.848
- Fastest Lap - #38 ADT Champion Racing - 0:49.260
- Distance - 290.567 km
- Average Speed - 107.544 km/h

American Le Mans Series
Previous race: 2003 Monterey Sports Car Championships	2003 season	Next race: 2003 Petit Le Mans
