= Scott Bradley =

Scott Bradley may refer to:

- Scott Bradley (composer) (1891–1977), American composer, pianist, and conductor
- Scott Bradley (baseball) (born 1960), American baseball catcher
- Scott Bradley (politician) (born 1952), American politician and university administrator from Utah
- Scott Bradley (racing driver) (born 1976), American racing driver

== See also ==
- Scott Bradlee (born 1981), American musician
