= 2003 American Le Mans Series =

33rd season of the racing series organized by IMSA

Seasons
- ← 2002 2004 →

The 2003 American Le Mans Series season was the fifth season for the IMSA American Le Mans Series, and the 33rd overall season of the IMSA GT Championship. It was a series for Le Mans Prototypes (LMP) and Grand Touring (GT) race cars divided into 4 classes: LMP900, LMP675, GTS, and GT. It began March 15, 2003, and ended October 18, 2003, after nine races.

Dyson Racing's overall win at Sonoma Raceway was the first time in ALMS history that the overall win was captured by a vehicle not from the LMP900 class.

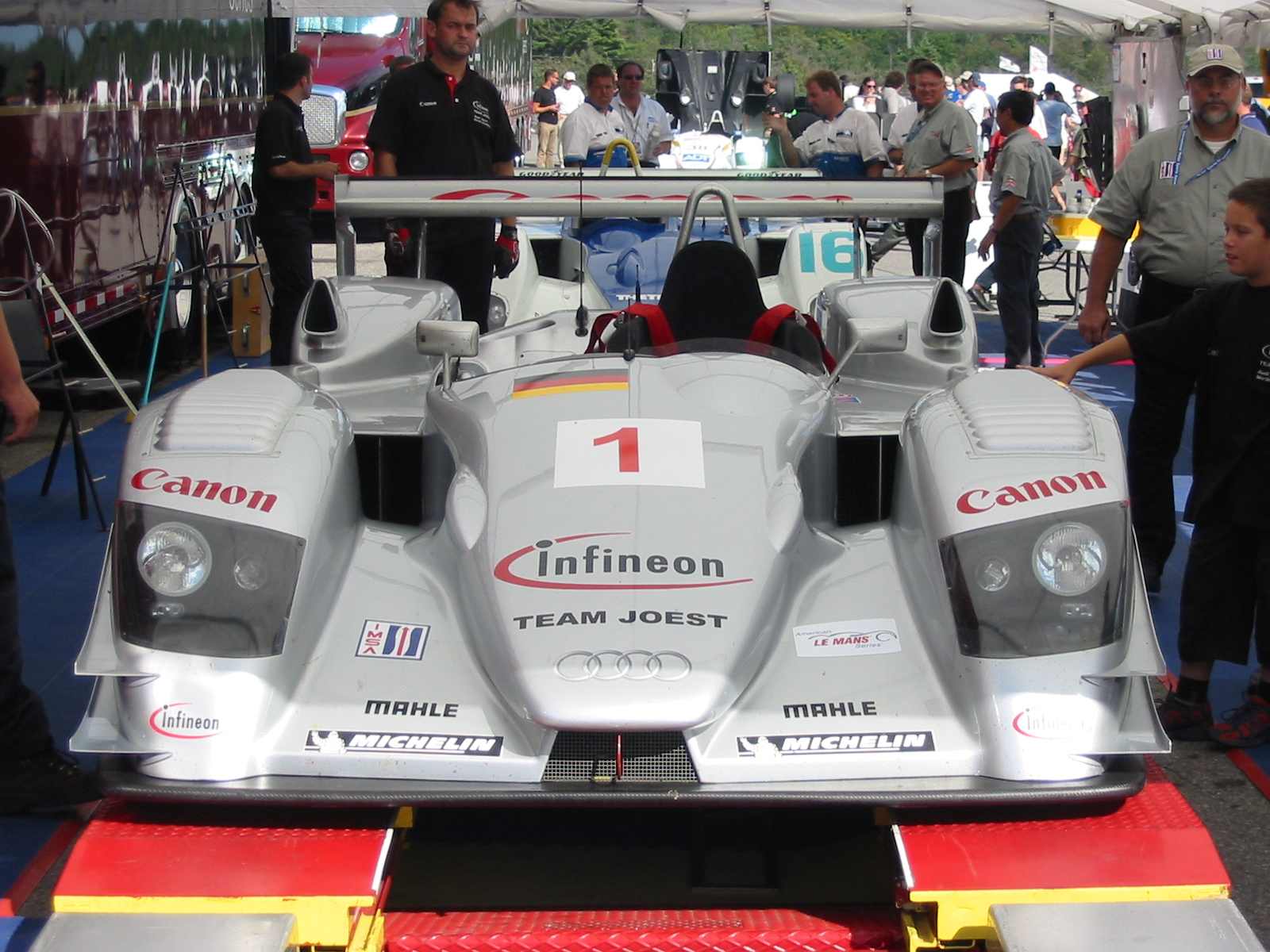
Team Joest won the LMP900 championship

== Schedule ==
Rnd	Race	Length	Circuit	Location	Date
1	(United States) Mobil 1 12 Hours of Sebring	12 Hours	Sebring International Raceway	Sebring, Florida	March 15
2	(United States) Chevy Grand Prix of Atlanta	2 Hours 45 Minutes	Road Atlanta	Braselton, Georgia	June 29
3	(United States) Infineon Grand Prix of Sonoma	2 Hours 45 Minutes	Sonoma Raceway	Sonoma, California	July 27
4	(Canada) Le Grand Prix de Trois-Rivières	3 Hours	Circuit Trois-Rivières	Trois-Rivières, Quebec	August 3
5	(Canada) Toronto Grand Prix of Mosport	2 Hours 45 Minutes	Mosport	Bowmanville, Ontario	August 17
6	(United States) Road America 500	2 Hours 45 Minutes	Road America	Elkhart Lake, Wisconsin	August 24
7	(United States) Fry's Electronics Sports Car Championships	2 Hours 45 Minutes	Mazda Raceway Laguna Seca	Monterey, California	September 7
8	(United States) Grand Prix Americas	2 Hours 45 Minutes	Bayfront Park	Downtown, Miami, Florida	September 27
9	(United States) Petit Le Mans	1000 Miles or 10 Hours	Road Atlanta	Braselton, Georgia	October 18

Races that were planned but later cancelled.

Race	Length	Circuit	Location	Date	Cancellation reason
Mexico City	6 Hours	Autódromo Hermanos Rodríguez	Mexico City	April 5	Financial issues
(European Union) European event	N/A	N/A	Europe	Late May	No viable candidate
(United States) Grand Prix of Washington, D.C.	2 Hours 45 Minutes	RFK Stadium street circuit	Washington, D.C.	June 29	Operational problems

=== Schedule changes ===
The ALMS originally announced an 11-round schedule with the highlights being planned races in Europe and Mexico. The planned European round was to be at a premier European facility in mid to late May, between the time of the traditional pre-practice for the 24 Hours of Le Mans and the actual running of the Le Mans 24-hour race in mid-June. The European round would be dropped as no viable candidates could be found as "The combination of many European tracks experiencing serious financial challenges, coupled with the general state of European sports car racing has prevented us from confirming an acceptable arrangement for the American Le Mans Series and its participants."

Just before the season began, the ALMS announced that the races in Mexico and Washington, DC had both been cancelled due to ongoing problems with the race organizers. the Grand Prix of Atlanta returned for the first time since 1999 to replace the cancelled events.

Road America was reduced from 500 miles to 2 hours and 45 minutes to bring in line with the rest of the schedule, and Mid-Ohio Sports Car Course did not return for 2003.

== Entry list ==
=== Le Mans Prototype 900 (LMP900) ===
Team	Chassis	Engine	Tyre	No.	Drivers	Rnds.
(United Kingdom) Team Nasamax	Reynard 01Q	Cosworth XDE 2.7 L Turbo V8 (Bio-ethanol)	G	01	(United States) Bryan Herta	1
(United Kingdom) Team Nasamax	Reynard 01Q	Cosworth XDE 2.7 L Turbo V8 (Bio-ethanol)	G	01	(Canada) Robbie Stirling	1
(United Kingdom) Team Nasamax	Reynard 01Q	Cosworth XDE 2.7 L Turbo V8 (Bio-ethanol)	G	01	(France) Romain Dumas	1
(Germany) Infineon Team Joest	Audi R8	Audi 3.6 L Turbo V8	M	1	(Germany) Frank Biela	All
(Germany) Infineon Team Joest	Audi R8	Audi 3.6 L Turbo V8	M	1	(Germany) Marco Werner	All
(Germany) Infineon Team Joest	Audi R8	Audi 3.6 L Turbo V8	M	1	(Austria) Philipp Peter	1
(United Kingdom) Lister Storm Racing	Lister Storm LMP	Chevrolet LS1 6.0 L V8	D	6	(United Kingdom) Jamie Campbell-Walter	1
(United Kingdom) Lister Storm Racing	Lister Storm LMP	Chevrolet LS1 6.0 L V8	D	6	(United Kingdom) Ian MacKellar	1
(United Kingdom) Team Bentley	Bentley Speed 8	Bentley 4.0 L Turbo V8	M	7	(Denmark) Tom Kristensen	1
(United Kingdom) Team Bentley	Bentley Speed 8	Bentley 4.0 L Turbo V8	M	7	(United Kingdom) Guy Smith	1
(United Kingdom) Team Bentley	Bentley Speed 8	Bentley 4.0 L Turbo V8	M	7	(Italy) Rinaldo Capello	1
(United Kingdom) Team Bentley	Bentley Speed 8	Bentley 4.0 L Turbo V8	M	8	(United Kingdom) Johnny Herbert	1
(United Kingdom) Team Bentley	Bentley Speed 8	Bentley 4.0 L Turbo V8	M	8	(Australia) David Brabham	1
(United Kingdom) Team Bentley	Bentley Speed 8	Bentley 4.0 L Turbo V8	M	8	(United Kingdom) Mark Blundell	1
(United Kingdom) Audi Sport UK	Audi R8	Audi 3.6 L Turbo V8	M	9	(Finland) Mika Salo	1
(United Kingdom) Audi Sport UK	Audi R8	Audi 3.6 L Turbo V8	M	9	(United Kingdom) Jonny Kane	1
(United Kingdom) Audi Sport UK	Audi R8	Audi 3.6 L Turbo V8	M	9	(United Kingdom) Perry McCarthy	1
(United States) JML Team Panoz	Panoz LMP01 Evo	Élan 6L8 6.0L V8	M	10	(Monaco) Olivier Beretta	All
(United States) JML Team Panoz	Panoz LMP01 Evo	Élan 6L8 6.0L V8	M	10	(Italy) Max Papis	1–2, 9
(United States) JML Team Panoz	Panoz LMP01 Evo	Élan 6L8 6.0L V8	M	10	(United States) Gunnar Jeannette	1, 3
(United States) JML Team Panoz	Panoz LMP01 Evo	Élan 6L8 6.0L V8	M	10	(Belgium) David Saelens	4–9
(United States) JML Team Panoz	Panoz LMP01 Evo	Élan 6L8 6.0L V8	M	11	(Canada) Scott Maxwell	1, 4–5, 8–9
(United States) JML Team Panoz	Panoz LMP01 Evo	Élan 6L8 6.0L V8	M	11	(Switzerland) Benjamin Leuenberger	1, 3, 6–7, 9
(United States) JML Team Panoz	Panoz LMP01 Evo	Élan 6L8 6.0L V8	M	11	(Canada) John Graham	1
(United States) JML Team Panoz	Panoz LMP01 Evo	Élan 6L8 6.0L V8	M	11	(Belgium) David Saelens	2–3
(United States) JML Team Panoz	Panoz LMP01 Evo	Élan 6L8 6.0L V8	M	11	(United States) Gunnar Jeannette	2, 4–9
(United States) American Spirit Racing	Riley & Scott Mk III C	Lincoln (Élan) 5.0 L V8	D	12	(United States) Michael Lewis	All
(United States) American Spirit Racing	Riley & Scott Mk III C	Lincoln (Élan) 5.0 L V8	D	12	(United States) Tomy Drissi	All
(United States) American Spirit Racing	Riley & Scott Mk III C	Lincoln (Élan) 5.0 L V8	D	12	(United States) Guy Cosmo	1
(United States) American Spirit Racing	Riley & Scott Mk III C	Lincoln (Élan) 5.0 L V8	D	12	(Canada) Melanie Paterson	9
(United States) Doran Lista Racing	Dallara SP1	Judd GV4 4.0 L V10	M	27	(Belgium) Didier Theys	1–3
(United States) Doran Lista Racing	Dallara SP1	Judd GV4 4.0 L V10	M	27	(Belgium) Eric van de Poele	1–2
(United States) Doran Lista Racing	Dallara SP1	Judd GV4 4.0 L V10	M	27	(Switzerland) Fredy Lienhard	1
(United States) Doran Lista Racing	Dallara SP1	Judd GV4 4.0 L V10	M	27	(United States) Bill Auberlen	3
(United States) Intersport Racing	Lola B2K/10B	Judd GV4 4.0 L V10	G	30	(United States) Clint Field	All
(United States) Intersport Racing	Lola B2K/10B	Judd GV4 4.0 L V10	G	30	(United States) Rick Sutherland	1, 3, 6–7
(United States) Intersport Racing	Lola B2K/10B	Judd GV4 4.0 L V10	G	30	(United States) John Macaluso	1
(United States) Intersport Racing	Lola B2K/10B	Judd GV4 4.0 L V10	G	30	(United States) Mike Durand	2, 4, 8–9
(United States) Intersport Racing	Lola B2K/10B	Judd GV4 4.0 L V10	G	30	(France) Georges Forgeois	5
(United States) Intersport Racing	Lola B2K/10B	Judd GV4 4.0 L V10	G	30	(United States) Larry Oberto	9
(United States) Jim Matthews Racing	Riley & Scott Mk III C	Ford (Yates) 6.0 L V8	M	36	(United States) Jim Matthews	1
(United States) Jim Matthews Racing	Riley & Scott Mk III C	Ford (Yates) 6.0 L V8	M	36	(Belgium) Marc Goossens	1
(United States) Jim Matthews Racing	Riley & Scott Mk III C	Ford (Yates) 6.0 L V8	M	36	(Denmark) Jan Magnussen	1
(United States) Champion Racing	Audi R8	Audi 3.6 L Turbo V8	M	38	(Finland) J.J. Lehto	All
(United States) Champion Racing	Audi R8	Audi 3.6 L Turbo V8	M	38	(Sweden) Stefan Johansson	1, 9*
(United States) Champion Racing	Audi R8	Audi 3.6 L Turbo V8	M	38	(Italy) Emanuele Pirro	1
(United States) Champion Racing	Audi R8	Audi 3.6 L Turbo V8	M	38	(United Kingdom) Johnny Herbert	2–9
(United Kingdom) Taurus Sports Racing	Lola B2K/10B	Judd GV4 4.0 L V10	D	77	(United Kingdom) Phil Andrews	1
(United Kingdom) Taurus Sports Racing	Lola B2K/10B	Judd GV4 4.0 L V10	D	77	(United Kingdom) Justin Keen	1
(United Kingdom) Taurus Sports Racing	Lola B2K/10B	Judd GV4 4.0 L V10	D	77	(United States) Larry Oberto	1
(United States) Sezio Florida Racing Team	Norma M2000	Ford (Kinetic) 6.0 L V8	D	87	(United States) Allen Ziegelman	1
(United States) Sezio Florida Racing Team	Norma M2000	Ford (Kinetic) 6.0 L V8	D	87	(France) Patrice Roussel	1
(United States) Sezio Florida Racing Team	Norma M2000	Ford (Kinetic) 6.0 L V8	D	87	(United Kingdom) Ian James	1

=== Le Mans Prototype 675 (LMP675) ===
Team	Chassis	Engine	Tyre	No.	Drivers	Rnds.
(United Kingdom) RN Motorsports	DBA4 03S	Zytek ZG348 3.4 L V8	D	15	(Japan) Hayanari Shimoda	1
(United Kingdom) RN Motorsports	DBA4 03S	Zytek ZG348 3.4 L V8	D	15	(Denmark) John Nielsen	1
(United States) Dyson Racing Team	MG-Lola EX257	MG (AER) XP20 2.0 L Turbo I4	G	16	(United Kingdom) James Weaver	All
(United States) Dyson Racing Team	MG-Lola EX257	MG (AER) XP20 2.0 L Turbo I4	G	16	(United States) Butch Leitzinger	All
(United States) Dyson Racing Team	MG-Lola EX257	MG (AER) XP20 2.0 L Turbo I4	G	16	(United Kingdom) Andy Wallace	1, 9
(United States) Dyson Racing Team	MG-Lola EX257	MG (AER) XP20 2.0 L Turbo I4	G	20	(United States) Chris Dyson	All
(United States) Dyson Racing Team	MG-Lola EX257	MG (AER) XP20 2.0 L Turbo I4	G	20	(Belgium) Didier de Radiguès	1, 9
(United States) Dyson Racing Team	MG-Lola EX257	MG (AER) XP20 2.0 L Turbo I4	G	20	(United States) Chad Block	1, 9
(United States) Dyson Racing Team	MG-Lola EX257	MG (AER) XP20 2.0 L Turbo I4	G	20	(United Kingdom) Andy Wallace	2–8
(United States) Marshall Cooke Racing	Lola B2K/40	Ford (Millington) 2.0 L Turbo I4	P	18	(United Kingdom) Ben Devlin	1
(United States) Marshall Cooke Racing	Lola B2K/40	Ford (Millington) 2.0 L Turbo I4	P	18	(United States) Jason Workman	1
(United States) Marshall Cooke Racing	Lola B2K/40	Ford (Millington) 2.0 L Turbo I4	P	18	(Canada) Melanie Paterson	1
(United States) Essex Racing	Lola B2K/40	Nissan (AER) VQL 3.0L V6	P	18	(United States) Jason Workman	2–9
(United States) Essex Racing	Lola B2K/40	Nissan (AER) VQL 3.0L V6	P	18	(Canada) Melanie Paterson	2, 4–5
(United States) Essex Racing	Lola B2K/40	Nissan (AER) VQL 3.0L V6	P	18	(Canada) David McEntee	3
(United States) Essex Racing	Lola B2K/40	Nissan (AER) VQL 3.0L V6	P	18	(United States) James Gue	6
(United States) Essex Racing	Lola B2K/40	Nissan (AER) VQL 3.0L V6	P	18	(United States) Scott Bradley	7–9
(United States) Essex Racing	Lola B2K/40	Nissan (AER) VQL 3.0L V6	P	18	(United States) Andrew Davis	9
(United States) Intersport Racing	MG-Lola EX257 (1-8) Lola B01/60 (9)	MG (AER) XP20 2.0 L Turbo I4 (1-8) Judd KV675 3.4 L V8 (9)	G	37	(United States) Jon Field	All
(United States) Intersport Racing	MG-Lola EX257 (1-8) Lola B01/60 (9)	MG (AER) XP20 2.0 L Turbo I4 (1-8) Judd KV675 3.4 L V8 (9)	G	37	(United States) Duncan Dayton	All
(United States) Intersport Racing	MG-Lola EX257 (1-8) Lola B01/60 (9)	MG (AER) XP20 2.0 L Turbo I4 (1-8) Judd KV675 3.4 L V8 (9)	G	37	(United States) Mike Durand	1
(United States) Intersport Racing	MG-Lola EX257 (1-8) Lola B01/60 (9)	MG (AER) XP20 2.0 L Turbo I4 (1-8) Judd KV675 3.4 L V8 (9)	G	37	(United States) Larry Connor	9
(United States) Team Bucknum Racing	Pilbeam MP91	Willman (JPX) 3.4 L V6	D	56	(United States) Bryan Willman	All
(United States) Team Bucknum Racing	Pilbeam MP91	Willman (JPX) 3.4 L V6	D	56	(United States) Chris McMurry	All
(United States) Team Bucknum Racing	Pilbeam MP91	Willman (JPX) 3.4 L V6	D	56	(United States) Jeff Bucknum	1–8
(United States) Team Bucknum Racing	Pilbeam MP91	Willman (JPX) 3.4 L V6	D	56	(United States) Alan Rudolph	9
(United States) Downing-Atlanta Inc.	WR LMP02	Mazda R26B 2.6L 4-Rotor	D	64	(United States) Jim Downing	2, 6, 9
(United States) Downing-Atlanta Inc.	WR LMP02	Mazda R26B 2.6L 4-Rotor	D	64	(United States) Howard Katz	2, 6, 9
(United States) Downing-Atlanta Inc.	WR LMP02	Mazda R26B 2.6L 4-Rotor	D	64	(Japan) Yojiro Terada	9
(United States) AB Motorsport	Pilbeam MP84	Nissan (AER) VQL 3.0L V6	A	77	(United States) Joe Blacker	2
(United States) AB Motorsport	Pilbeam MP84	Nissan (AER) VQL 3.0L V6	A	77	(United States) John Burke	2

=== Grand Touring Sport (GTS) ===
Team	Chassis	Engine	Tyre	No.	Drivers	Rnds.
(Italy) Team Olive Garden	Ferrari 550 Maranello	Ferrari 6.0 L V12	P	0	(Italy) Emanuele Naspetti	All
(Italy) Team Olive Garden	Ferrari 550 Maranello	Ferrari 6.0 L V12	P	0	(Italy) Mimmo Schiattarella	1–6, 8–9
(Italy) Team Olive Garden	Ferrari 550 Maranello	Ferrari 6.0 L V12	P	0	(Venezuela) Johnny Cecotto	1
(Italy) Team Olive Garden	Ferrari 550 Maranello	Ferrari 6.0 L V12	P	0	(United States) Bill Auberlen	7
(Italy) Team Olive Garden	Ferrari 550 Maranello	Ferrari 6.0 L V12	P	0	(Switzerland) Joël Camathias	9
(United Kingdom) Prodrive	Ferrari 550-GTS Maranello	Ferrari 5.9L V12	M	08	(Netherlands) Jan Lammers	9
(United Kingdom) Prodrive	Ferrari 550-GTS Maranello	Ferrari 5.9L V12	M	08	(France) Jérôme Policand	9
(United Kingdom) Prodrive	Ferrari 550-GTS Maranello	Ferrari 5.9L V12	M	08	(Switzerland) Frédéric Dor	9
(United Kingdom) Prodrive	Ferrari 550-GTS Maranello	Ferrari 5.9L V12	M	80	(United Kingdom) Darren Turner	1, 8
(United Kingdom) Prodrive	Ferrari 550-GTS Maranello	Ferrari 5.9L V12	M	80	(United Kingdom) Anthony Davidson	1, 9
(United Kingdom) Prodrive	Ferrari 550-GTS Maranello	Ferrari 5.9L V12	M	80	(United Kingdom) Kelvin Burt	1
(United Kingdom) Prodrive	Ferrari 550-GTS Maranello	Ferrari 5.9L V12	M	80	(France) Jérôme Policand	2
(United Kingdom) Prodrive	Ferrari 550-GTS Maranello	Ferrari 5.9L V12	M	80	(United States) Danica Patrick	2
(United Kingdom) Prodrive	Ferrari 550-GTS Maranello	Ferrari 5.9L V12	M	80	(Australia) David Brabham	3–9
(United Kingdom) Prodrive	Ferrari 550-GTS Maranello	Ferrari 5.9L V12	M	80	(Denmark) Jan Magnussen	3–7, 9
(United Kingdom) Prodrive	Ferrari 550-GTS Maranello	Ferrari 5.9L V12	M	88	(Czech Republic) Tomáš Enge	All
(United Kingdom) Prodrive	Ferrari 550-GTS Maranello	Ferrari 5.9L V12	M	88	(Netherlands) Peter Kox	All
(United Kingdom) Prodrive	Ferrari 550-GTS Maranello	Ferrari 5.9L V12	M	88	(United Kingdom) Jamie Davies	1
(United Kingdom) Prodrive	Ferrari 550-GTS Maranello	Ferrari 5.9L V12	M	88	(Switzerland) Alain Menu	9
(Germany) Konrad Motorsport	Saleen S7-R	Ford 7.0L V8	D	2	(Austria) Franz Konrad	1, 5–6, 8
(Germany) Konrad Motorsport	Saleen S7-R	Ford 7.0L V8	D	2	(United Kingdom) Robert Nearn	1, 8
(Germany) Konrad Motorsport	Saleen S7-R	Ford 7.0L V8	D	2	(Switzerland) Toni Seiler	1
(Germany) Konrad Motorsport	Saleen S7-R	Ford 7.0L V8	D	2	(United States) Mark Neuhaus	5–6
(Germany) Konrad Motorsport	Saleen S7-R	Ford 7.0L V8	D	2	(Austria) Walter Lechner Jr.	5
(Germany) Konrad Motorsport	Saleen S7-R	Ford 7.0L V8	D	2	(Germany) Wolfgang Kaufmann	6
(United States) Corvette Racing	Chevrolet Corvette C5-R	Chevrolet 7.0 L V8	G	3	(Canada) Ron Fellows	All
(United States) Corvette Racing	Chevrolet Corvette C5-R	Chevrolet 7.0 L V8	G	3	(United States) Johnny O'Connell	All
(United States) Corvette Racing	Chevrolet Corvette C5-R	Chevrolet 7.0 L V8	G	3	(France) Franck Fréon	1, 9
(United States) Corvette Racing	Chevrolet Corvette C5-R	Chevrolet 7.0 L V8	G	4	(United Kingdom) Oliver Gavin	All
(United States) Corvette Racing	Chevrolet Corvette C5-R	Chevrolet 7.0 L V8	G	4	(United States) Kelly Collins	All
(United States) Corvette Racing	Chevrolet Corvette C5-R	Chevrolet 7.0 L V8	G	4	(United States) Andy Pilgrim	1, 9
(United States) Carsport America	Pagani Zonda GR (1) Dodge Viper GTS-R (6)	Mercedes-AMG 6.3 L V12 (1) Dodge 8.0L V10 (6)	P	17	(Netherlands) Mike Hezemans	1
(United States) Carsport America	Pagani Zonda GR (1) Dodge Viper GTS-R (6)	Mercedes-AMG 6.3 L V12 (1) Dodge 8.0L V10 (6)	P	17	(Belgium) Anthony Kumpen	1
(United States) Carsport America	Pagani Zonda GR (1) Dodge Viper GTS-R (6)	Mercedes-AMG 6.3 L V12 (1) Dodge 8.0L V10 (6)	P	17	(United States) Tom Weickardt	6
(United States) Carsport America	Pagani Zonda GR (1) Dodge Viper GTS-R (6)	Mercedes-AMG 6.3 L V12 (1) Dodge 8.0L V10 (6)	P	17	(United States) Joe Ellis	6
(United States) Carsport America	Pagani Zonda GR (1) Dodge Viper GTS-R (6)	Mercedes-AMG 6.3 L V12 (1) Dodge 8.0L V10 (6)	P	17	(United States) Romeo Kapudija	6
(United States) Carsport America	Dodge Viper GTS-R	Dodge 8.0L V10	P	71	(France) Jean-Philippe Belloc	1–3, 5–9
(United States) Carsport America	Dodge Viper GTS-R	Dodge 8.0L V10	P	71	(United States) Tom Weickardt	1–2, 5, 7–9
(United States) Carsport America	Dodge Viper GTS-R	Dodge 8.0L V10	P	71	(United States) Jeff Altenburg	1, 6
(United States) Carsport America	Dodge Viper GTS-R	Dodge 8.0L V10	P	71	(Canada) Aaron Povoledo	3
(United States) Carsport America	Dodge Viper GTS-R	Dodge 8.0L V10	P	71	(France) Éric Cayrolle	9
(United Kingdom) Graham Nash Motorsport	Saleen S7-R	Ford 7.0L V8	D	83	(Brazil) Thomas Erdos	1
(United Kingdom) Graham Nash Motorsport	Saleen S7-R	Ford 7.0L V8	D	83	(Portugal) Pedro Chaves	1
(United Kingdom) Graham Nash Motorsport	Saleen S7-R	Ford 7.0L V8	D	83	(United Kingdom) Gavin Pickering	1

=== Grand Touring (GT) ===
Team	Chassis	Engine	Tyre	No.	Drivers	Rnds.
(United States) Hyper Sport	Porsche 996 GT3-RS (1) Panoz Esperante GT-LM (2-9)	Porsche 3.6 L Flat-6 (1) Ford (Elan) 5.0 L V8 (2-9)	P	03	(United States) Brad Nyberg	1–4, 7–9
(United States) Hyper Sport	Porsche 996 GT3-RS (1) Panoz Esperante GT-LM (2-9)	Porsche 3.6 L Flat-6 (1) Ford (Elan) 5.0 L V8 (2-9)	P	03	(United States) Rick Skelton	1–4, 7–9
(United States) Hyper Sport	Porsche 996 GT3-RS (1) Panoz Esperante GT-LM (2-9)	Porsche 3.6 L Flat-6 (1) Ford (Elan) 5.0 L V8 (2-9)	P	03	(United States) Joe Foster	1–4, 7, 9
(Germany) RWS-Yukos Motorsport	Porsche 996 GT3-R	Porsche 3.6 L Flat-6	P	07	(Austria) Walter Lechner, Jr.	1
(Germany) RWS-Yukos Motorsport	Porsche 996 GT3-R	Porsche 3.6 L Flat-6	P	07	(France) Stéphane Daoudi	1
(Germany) RWS-Yukos Motorsport	Porsche 996 GT3-R	Porsche 3.6 L Flat-6	P	07	(Russia) Nikolai Fomenko	1
(United States) MCR	Chevrolet Corvette C5-RGT	Chevrolet LS1 7.0 L V8	?	5	(United States) Bob Mazzuoccola	1*
(United States) MCR	Chevrolet Corvette C5-RGT	Chevrolet LS1 7.0 L V8	?	5	(United States) Shane Lewis	1*
(United States) Yokohama/ADVAN	BMW M3 E46	BMW 3.2 L I6	Y	6	(United States) Bill Auberlen	9
(United States) Yokohama/ADVAN	BMW M3 E46	BMW 3.2 L I6	Y	6	(United States) Boris Said	9
(United States) Yokohama/ADVAN	BMW M3 E46	BMW 3.2 L I6	Y	6	(Germany) Hans-Joachim Stuck	9
(France) Perspective Racing	Porsche 996 GT3-RS	Porsche 3.6 L Flat-6	D	21	(France) Thierry Perrier	1*
(France) Perspective Racing	Porsche 996 GT3-RS	Porsche 3.6 L Flat-6	D	21	(Philippines) Angelo Barretto	1*
(France) Perspective Racing	Porsche 996 GT3-RS	Porsche 3.6 L Flat-6	D	21	(Belgium) Michel Neugarten	1*
(United States) Alex Job Racing	Porsche 996 GT3-RS	Porsche 3.6 L Flat-6	M	23	(Germany) Sascha Maassen	All
(United States) Alex Job Racing	Porsche 996 GT3-RS	Porsche 3.6 L Flat-6	M	23	(Germany) Lucas Lühr	All
(United States) Alex Job Racing	Porsche 996 GT3-RS	Porsche 3.6 L Flat-6	M	24	(Germany) Timo Bernhard	All
(United States) Alex Job Racing	Porsche 996 GT3-RS	Porsche 3.6 L Flat-6	M	24	(Germany) Jörg Bergmeister	All
(United States) Alex Job Racing	Porsche 996 GT3-RS	Porsche 3.6 L Flat-6	M	24	(France) Romain Dumas	9
(United States) JMB Racing USA	Ferrari 360 Modena N-GT	Ferrari 3.6 L V8	P	28	(France) Stéphane Grégoire	All
(United States) JMB Racing USA	Ferrari 360 Modena N-GT	Ferrari 3.6 L V8	P	28	(Italy) Christian Pescatori	1, 4
(United States) JMB Racing USA	Ferrari 360 Modena N-GT	Ferrari 3.6 L V8	P	28	(Italy) Fabio Babini	1
(United States) JMB Racing USA	Ferrari 360 Modena N-GT	Ferrari 3.6 L V8	P	28	(Chile) Eliseo Salazar	2–3, 5, 7–8
(United States) JMB Racing USA	Ferrari 360 Modena N-GT	Ferrari 3.6 L V8	P	28	(Switzerland) Iradj Alexander	5–7
(United States) JMB Racing USA	Ferrari 360 Modena N-GT	Ferrari 3.6 L V8	P	28	(United States) Stephen Earle	9
(United States) JMB Racing USA	Ferrari 360 Modena N-GT	Ferrari 3.6 L V8	P	28	(United States) Philip Shearer	9
(United States) JMB Racing USA	Ferrari 360 Modena N-GT	Ferrari 3.6 L V8	P	29	(Italy) Andrea Garbagnati	1, 3
(United States) JMB Racing USA	Ferrari 360 Modena N-GT	Ferrari 3.6 L V8	P	29	(Italy) Ludovico Manfredi	1, 3
(United States) JMB Racing USA	Ferrari 360 Modena N-GT	Ferrari 3.6 L V8	P	29	(United States) Stephen Earle	1, 7–8
(United States) JMB Racing USA	Ferrari 360 Modena N-GT	Ferrari 3.6 L V8	P	29	(Netherlands) Peter Kutemann	5–6
(United States) JMB Racing USA	Ferrari 360 Modena N-GT	Ferrari 3.6 L V8	P	29	(France) Antoine Gosse	5
(United States) JMB Racing USA	Ferrari 360 Modena N-GT	Ferrari 3.6 L V8	P	29	(United States) Philip Shearer	6
(United States) JMB Racing USA	Ferrari 360 Modena N-GT	Ferrari 3.6 L V8	P	29	(United States) Mark Neuhaus	7–8
(United States) White Lightning (United States) Petersen Motorsports	Porsche 996 GT3-RS	Porsche 3.6 L Flat-6	M	31	(United Kingdom) Johnny Mowlem	1, 3, 6–9
(United States) White Lightning (United States) Petersen Motorsports	Porsche 996 GT3-RS	Porsche 3.6 L Flat-6	M	31	(United States) Craig Stanton	1, 3, 6–9
(United States) White Lightning (United States) Petersen Motorsports	Porsche 996 GT3-RS	Porsche 3.6 L Flat-6	M	31	(Sweden) Niclas Jönsson	1
(United States) White Lightning (United States) Petersen Motorsports	Porsche 996 GT3-RS	Porsche 3.6 L Flat-6	M	31	(United States) Michael Petersen	9
(United States) Ferri Competizione	Ferrari 360 Modena GT	Ferrari 3.6 L V8	P	32	(Italy) Andrea Bertolini	5
(United States) Ferri Competizione	Ferrari 360 Modena GT	Ferrari 3.6 L V8	P	32	(Italy) Mauro Baldi	5
(United States) ZIP Racing	Porsche 996 GT3-RS	Porsche 3.6 L Flat-6	D	33	(United States) Spencer Pumpelly	1–4, 6–8
(United States) ZIP Racing	Porsche 996 GT3-RS	Porsche 3.6 L Flat-6	D	33	(United States) Andy Lally	1–4, 6–8
(United States) ZIP Racing	Porsche 996 GT3-RS	Porsche 3.6 L Flat-6	D	33	(United States) Steven Ivankovich	1
(United States) ZIP Racing	Porsche 996 GT3-RS	Porsche 3.6 L Flat-6	D	33	(United States) Romeo Kapudija	8
(United States) ZIP Racing	Porsche 996 GT3-RS	Porsche 3.6 L Flat-6	D	39	(United States) Emil Assentato	1
(United States) ZIP Racing	Porsche 996 GT3-RS	Porsche 3.6 L Flat-6	D	39	(United States) Nick Longhi	1
(United States) ZIP Racing	Porsche 996 GT3-RS	Porsche 3.6 L Flat-6	D	39	(United States) Brent Sherman	1
(United States) Risi Competizione	Ferrari 360 Modena GT	Ferrari 3.6 L V8	M	34	(United Kingdom) Marino Franchitti	1
(United States) Risi Competizione	Ferrari 360 Modena GT	Ferrari 3.6 L V8	M	34	(United Kingdom) Kevin McGarrity	1
(United States) Risi Competizione	Ferrari 360 Modena GT	Ferrari 3.6 L V8	M	34	(United Kingdom) Phillip Bennett	1
(United States) Risi Competizione	Ferrari 360 Modena GT	Ferrari 3.6 L V8	M	35	(Germany) Ralf Kelleners	All
(United States) Risi Competizione	Ferrari 360 Modena GT	Ferrari 3.6 L V8	M	35	(United States) Anthony Lazzaro	All
(United States) Risi Competizione	Ferrari 360 Modena GT	Ferrari 3.6 L V8	M	35	(United States) Terry Borcheller	1
(United States) Alegra Motorsports	BMW M3 E46	BMW 3.2 L I6	Y	40	(United States) Boris Said	1
(United States) Alegra Motorsports	BMW M3 E46	BMW 3.2 L I6	Y	40	(United States) Catersby Jones	1
(United States) Alegra Motorsports	BMW M3 E46	BMW 3.2 L I6	Y	40	(United States) Carlos DeQuesada	1
(United States) Alegra Motorsports	BMW M3 E46	BMW 3.2 L I6	Y	40	(United States) Bill Auberlen	8
(United States) Alegra Motorsports	BMW M3 E46	BMW 3.2 L I6	Y	40	(Sweden) Niclas Jönsson	8
(United States) Alegra Motorsports	BMW M3 E46	BMW 3.2 L I6	Y	41	(United States) Ross Bluestein	8
(United States) Alegra Motorsports	BMW M3 E46	BMW 3.2 L I6	Y	41	(United States) Carlos DeQuesada	8
(United Kingdom) DeWALT Racesport Salisbury	TVR Tuscan T400R	TVR Speed Six 4.0 L I6	D	41	(United Kingdom) Rob Barff	1
(United Kingdom) DeWALT Racesport Salisbury	TVR Tuscan T400R	TVR Speed Six 4.0 L I6	D	41	(United Kingdom) Richard Hay	1
(United Kingdom) DeWALT Racesport Salisbury	TVR Tuscan T400R	TVR Speed Six 4.0 L I6	D	41	(United Kingdom) Richard Stanton	1
(United States) Orbit	Porsche 996 GT3-RS	Porsche 3.6 L Flat-6	M	42	(United States) Joe Policastro, Sr.	1–3, 6–9
(United States) Orbit	Porsche 996 GT3-RS	Porsche 3.6 L Flat-6	M	42	(United States) Joe Policastro, Jr.	1–3, 6–9
(United States) Orbit	Porsche 996 GT3-RS	Porsche 3.6 L Flat-6	M	42	(United States) Mike Fitzgerald	1
(United States) Orbit	Porsche 996 GT3-RS	Porsche 3.6 L Flat-6	M	42	(United States) Leo Hindery	6
(United States) Orbit	Porsche 996 GT3-RS	Porsche 3.6 L Flat-6	M	42	(United States) Randy Pobst	9
(United States) Orbit	Porsche 996 GT3-RS	Porsche 3.6 L Flat-6	M	43	(United States) Peter Baron	All
(United States) Orbit	Porsche 996 GT3-RS	Porsche 3.6 L Flat-6	M	43	(United States) Leo Hindery	1-3, 7, 9
(United States) Orbit	Porsche 996 GT3-RS	Porsche 3.6 L Flat-6	M	43	(Germany) Marc Lieb	1, 4–6, 8
(United States) Orbit	Porsche 996 GT3-RS	Porsche 3.6 L Flat-6	M	43	(Germany) Mike Rockenfeller	9
(Netherlands) Spyker Squadron	Spyker C8 Double-12R	BMW (Mader) 4.0 L V8	D	48	(Germany) Norman Simon	1
(Netherlands) Spyker Squadron	Spyker C8 Double-12R	BMW (Mader) 4.0 L V8	D	48	(Netherlands) Hans Hugenholtz	1
(Netherlands) Spyker Squadron	Spyker C8 Double-12R	BMW (Mader) 4.0 L V8	D	48	(Belgium) Patrick van Schoote	1
(Germany) Seikel Motorsport	Porsche 996 GT3-RS	Porsche 3.6 L Flat-6	Y	52	(United States) Philip Collin	1–2, 6, 9
(Germany) Seikel Motorsport	Porsche 996 GT3-RS	Porsche 3.6 L Flat-6	Y	52	(United States) John Lloyd	1, 6
(Germany) Seikel Motorsport	Porsche 996 GT3-RS	Porsche 3.6 L Flat-6	Y	52	(Canada) David Shep	1, 5
(Germany) Seikel Motorsport	Porsche 996 GT3-RS	Porsche 3.6 L Flat-6	Y	52	(Canada) Tony Burgess	2, 5
(Germany) Seikel Motorsport	Porsche 996 GT3-RS	Porsche 3.6 L Flat-6	Y	52	(New Zealand) Andrew Bagnall	9
(Germany) Seikel Motorsport	Porsche 996 GT3-RS	Porsche 3.6 L Flat-6	Y	53	(Italy) Alex Caffi	1
(Germany) Seikel Motorsport	Porsche 996 GT3-RS	Porsche 3.6 L Flat-6	Y	53	(Italy) Gabrio Rosa	1
(Germany) Seikel Motorsport	Porsche 996 GT3-RS	Porsche 3.6 L Flat-6	Y	53	(Switzerland) Andrea Chiesa	1
(United Kingdom) P.K. Sport	Porsche 996 GT3-R	Porsche 3.6 L Flat-6	P	60	(United Kingdom) Robin Liddell	All
(United Kingdom) P.K. Sport	Porsche 996 GT3-R	Porsche 3.6 L Flat-6	P	60	(United Kingdom) David Warnock	1, 9
(United Kingdom) P.K. Sport	Porsche 996 GT3-R	Porsche 3.6 L Flat-6	P	60	(United Kingdom) Piers Masarati	1
(United Kingdom) P.K. Sport	Porsche 996 GT3-R	Porsche 3.6 L Flat-6	P	60	(France) Jean-Philippe Belloc	2
(United Kingdom) P.K. Sport	Porsche 996 GT3-R	Porsche 3.6 L Flat-6	P	60	(Australia) Alex Davison	3–4, 6
(United Kingdom) P.K. Sport	Porsche 996 GT3-R	Porsche 3.6 L Flat-6	P	60	(United States) Vic Rice	5
(United Kingdom) P.K. Sport	Porsche 996 GT3-R	Porsche 3.6 L Flat-6	P	60	(Italy) Alex Caffi	7–9
(United Kingdom) P.K. Sport	Porsche 996 GT3-R	Porsche 3.6 L Flat-6	P	61	(United Kingdom) Ian Donaldson	1
(United Kingdom) P.K. Sport	Porsche 996 GT3-R	Porsche 3.6 L Flat-6	P	61	(United Kingdom) Bart Hayden	1
(United Kingdom) P.K. Sport	Porsche 996 GT3-R	Porsche 3.6 L Flat-6	P	61	(United Kingdom) Gregor Fisken	1
(United Kingdom) P.K. Sport	Porsche 996 GT3-R	Porsche 3.6 L Flat-6	P	61	(United States) Vic Rice	2–4, 6–7, 9
(United Kingdom) P.K. Sport	Porsche 996 GT3-R	Porsche 3.6 L Flat-6	P	61	(United Kingdom) Piers Masarati	2, 5–6
(United Kingdom) P.K. Sport	Porsche 996 GT3-R	Porsche 3.6 L Flat-6	P	61	(United States) Keith Alexander	3
(United Kingdom) P.K. Sport	Porsche 996 GT3-R	Porsche 3.6 L Flat-6	P	61	(United States) Spencer Trenery	4
(United Kingdom) P.K. Sport	Porsche 996 GT3-R	Porsche 3.6 L Flat-6	P	61	(Canada) John Graham	5
(United Kingdom) P.K. Sport	Porsche 996 GT3-R	Porsche 3.6 L Flat-6	P	61	(United Kingdom) David Warnock	7–8
(United Kingdom) P.K. Sport	Porsche 996 GT3-R	Porsche 3.6 L Flat-6	P	61	(United States) Ron Atapattu	8
(United Kingdom) P.K. Sport	Porsche 996 GT3-R	Porsche 3.6 L Flat-6	P	61	(United States) Romeo Kapudija	9
(United Kingdom) P.K. Sport	Porsche 996 GT3-R	Porsche 3.6 L Flat-6	P	61	(United States) Jon Groom	9
(United States) ACEMCO Motorsports	Ferrari 360 Modena GT	Ferrari 3.6 L V8	Y	63	(United States) Shane Lewis	All
(United States) ACEMCO Motorsports	Ferrari 360 Modena GT	Ferrari 3.6 L V8	Y	63	(United States) Andrew Davis	1–2
(United States) ACEMCO Motorsports	Ferrari 360 Modena GT	Ferrari 3.6 L V8	Y	63	(United States) B. J. Zacharias	1
(United States) ACEMCO Motorsports	Ferrari 360 Modena GT	Ferrari 3.6 L V8	Y	63	(United States) Terry Borcheller	3–9
(United States) ACEMCO Motorsports	Ferrari 360 Modena GT	Ferrari 3.6 L V8	Y	63	(United States) Darren Law	9
(United States) The Racer's Group	Porsche 996 GT3-RS	Porsche 3.6 L Flat-6	M	66	(United States) Kevin Buckler	All
(United States) The Racer's Group	Porsche 996 GT3-RS	Porsche 3.6 L Flat-6	M	66	(United States) Jim Pace	1
(United States) The Racer's Group	Porsche 996 GT3-RS	Porsche 3.6 L Flat-6	M	66	(Chile) Eliseo Salazar	1
(United States) The Racer's Group	Porsche 996 GT3-RS	Porsche 3.6 L Flat-6	M	66	(United States) Cort Wagner	2–9
(United States) The Racer's Group	Porsche 996 GT3-RS	Porsche 3.6 L Flat-6	M	66	(United States) Patrick Long	9
(United States) The Racer's Group	Porsche 996 GT3-RS	Porsche 3.6 L Flat-6	M	67	(United States) Michael Schrom	1–7
(United States) The Racer's Group	Porsche 996 GT3-RS	Porsche 3.6 L Flat-6	M	67	(Germany) Pierre Ehret	1–3, 6–8
(United States) The Racer's Group	Porsche 996 GT3-RS	Porsche 3.6 L Flat-6	M	67	(United States) Vic Rice	1
(United States) The Racer's Group	Porsche 996 GT3-RS	Porsche 3.6 L Flat-6	M	67	(United States) Marc Bunting	2
(United States) The Racer's Group	Porsche 996 GT3-RS	Porsche 3.6 L Flat-6	M	67	(Canada) Jean-Francois Dumoulin	4
(United States) The Racer's Group	Porsche 996 GT3-RS	Porsche 3.6 L Flat-6	M	67	(United States) Jeffrey Pabst	5
(United States) The Racer's Group	Porsche 996 GT3-RS	Porsche 3.6 L Flat-6	M	67	(United States) Jeff Zwart	8–9
(United States) The Racer's Group	Porsche 996 GT3-RS	Porsche 3.6 L Flat-6	M	67	(United States) Tom Nastasi	9
(United States) The Racer's Group	Porsche 996 GT3-RS	Porsche 3.6 L Flat-6	M	67	(United States) David Donner	9
(United States) The Racer's Group	Porsche 996 GT3-RS	Porsche 3.6 L Flat-6	M	68	(United States) Marc Bunting	All
(United States) The Racer's Group	Porsche 996 GT3-RS	Porsche 3.6 L Flat-6	M	68	(United States) Chris Gleason	All
(United States) The Racer's Group	Porsche 996 GT3-RS	Porsche 3.6 L Flat-6	M	68	(United States) Cort Wagner	1
(United States) The Racer's Group	Porsche 996 GT3-RS	Porsche 3.6 L Flat-6	M	68	(Germany) Pierre Ehret	9
(Germany) T2M Motorsport	Porsche 996 GT3-R	Porsche 3.6 L Flat-6	D	78	(France) Georges Forgeois	1
(Germany) T2M Motorsport	Porsche 996 GT3-R	Porsche 3.6 L Flat-6	D	78	(United States) Derek Clark	1
(Germany) T2M Motorsport	Porsche 996 GT3-R	Porsche 3.6 L Flat-6	D	78	(United States) Chip Vance	1
(United States) J-3 Racing	Porsche 996 GT3-RS	Porsche 3.6 L Flat-6	M	79	(United States) David Murry	All
(United States) J-3 Racing	Porsche 996 GT3-RS	Porsche 3.6 L Flat-6	M	79	(United States) Justin Jackson	All
(United States) J-3 Racing	Porsche 996 GT3-RS	Porsche 3.6 L Flat-6	M	79	(United States) Brian Cunningham	1, 9
(United States) Inline Cunningham Racing	Porsche 996 GT3-RS	Porsche 3.6 L Flat-6	Y	89	(Brazil) Oswaldo Negri, Jr.	3–4, 7, 9
(United States) Inline Cunningham Racing	Porsche 996 GT3-RS	Porsche 3.6 L Flat-6	Y	89	(United States) Scott Bader	3–4
(United States) Inline Cunningham Racing	Porsche 996 GT3-RS	Porsche 3.6 L Flat-6	Y	89	(United States) Burt Frisselle	7, 9
(United States) Inline Cunningham Racing	Porsche 996 GT3-RS	Porsche 3.6 L Flat-6	Y	89	(United States) Spencer Pumpelly	9*
(United States) Vici Racing	Lamborghini Diablo GTR	Lamborghini 6.0 L V12	P	90	(Germany) Ronny Meixner	1*
(United States) Vici Racing	Lamborghini Diablo GTR	Lamborghini 6.0 L V12	P	90	(United States) Joseph Safina	1*
(United States) Vici Racing	Lamborghini Diablo GTR	Lamborghini 6.0 L V12	P	90	(United States) Cristiano Piquet	1*

* Was on the entry list but did not participate in the event.

== Season results ==
Overall winner in bold.

Rnd	Circuit	LMP900 Winning Team	LMP675 Winning Team	GTS Winning Team	GT Winning Team	Results
Rnd	Circuit	LMP900 Winning Drivers	LMP675 Winning Drivers	GTS Winning Drivers	GT Winning Drivers	Results
1	Sebring	**(Germany) #1 Infineon Team Joest**	(United States) #20 Dyson Racing	(United States) #3 Corvette Racing	(United States) #23 Alex Job Racing	Results
1	Sebring	**(Germany) Frank Biela** **(Germany) Marco Werner** **(Austria) Philipp Peter**	(Belgium) Didier de Radiguès (United States) Chad Block (United States) Chris Dyson	(Canada) Ron Fellows (United States) Johnny O'Connell (France) Franck Fréon	(Germany) Sascha Maassen (Germany) Lucas Luhr	Results
2	Road Atlanta	**(United States) #38 ADT Champion Racing**	(United States) #37 Intersport Racing	(United States) #4 Corvette Racing	(United States) #24 Alex Job Racing	Results
2	Road Atlanta	**(Finland) JJ Lehto** **(United Kingdom) Johnny Herbert**	(United States) Duncan Dayton (United States) Jon Field	(United States) Kelly Collins (United Kingdom) Oliver Gavin	(Germany) Jörg Bergmeister (Germany) Timo Bernhard	Results
3	Sonoma	(Germany) #1 Infineon Team Joest	**(United States) #16 Dyson Racing**	(United States) #3 Corvette Racing	(United States) #23 Alex Job Racing	Results
3	Sonoma	(Germany) Frank Biela (Germany) Marco Werner	**(United States) Butch Leitzinger** **(United Kingdom) James Weaver**	(Canada) Ron Fellows (United States) Johnny O'Connell	(Germany) Sascha Maassen (Germany) Lucas Luhr	Results
4	Trois-Rivières	**(Germany) #1 Infineon Team Joest**	(United States) #37 Intersport Racing	(United States) #4 Corvette Racing	(United States) #23 Alex Job Racing	Results
4	Trois-Rivières	**(Germany) Frank Biela** **(Germany) Marco Werner**	(United States) Jon Field (United States) Duncan Dayton	(United States) Kelly Collins (United Kingdom) Oliver Gavin	(Germany) Sascha Maassen (Germany) Lucas Luhr	Results
5	Mosport	**(Germany) #1 Infineon Team Joest**	(United States) #20 Dyson Racing	(United States) #3 Corvette Racing	(United States) #24 Alex Job Racing	Results
5	Mosport	**(Germany) Frank Biela** **(Germany) Marco Werner**	(United Kingdom) Andy Wallace (United States) Chris Dyson	(Canada) Ron Fellows (United States) Johnny O'Connell	(Germany) Jörg Bergmeister (Germany) Timo Bernhard	Results
6	Road America	**(United States) #38 ADT Champion Racing**	(United States) #20 Dyson Racing	(United Kingdom) #80 Prodrive	(United States) #31 Petersen/White Lightning	Results
6	Road America	**(Finland) JJ Lehto** **(United Kingdom) Johnny Herbert**	(United Kingdom) Andy Wallace (United States) Chris Dyson	(Denmark) Jan Magnussen (Australia) David Brabham	(United States) Craig Stanton (United Kingdom) Johnny Mowlem	Results
7	Laguna Seca	**(Germany) #1 Infineon Team Joest**	(United States) #16 Dyson Racing	(United Kingdom) #80 Prodrive	(United States) #23 Alex Job Racing	Results
7	Laguna Seca	**(Germany) Frank Biela** **(Germany) Marco Werner**	(United States) Butch Leitzinger (United Kingdom) James Weaver	(Denmark) Jan Magnussen (Australia) David Brabham	(Germany) Sascha Maassen (Germany) Lucas Luhr	Results
8	Miami	**(United States) #38 ADT Champion Racing**	(United States) #20 Dyson Racing	(United Kingdom) #80 Prodrive	(United States) #23 Alex Job Racing	Results
8	Miami	**(Finland) JJ Lehto** **(United Kingdom) Johnny Herbert**	(United Kingdom) Andy Wallace (United States) Chris Dyson	(United Kingdom) Darren Turner (Australia) David Brabham	(Germany) Sascha Maassen (Germany) Lucas Luhr	Results
9	Road Atlanta	**(United States) #38 ADT Champion Racing**	(United States) #37 Intersport Racing	(United Kingdom) #88 Prodrive	(United States) #24 Alex Job Racing	Results
9	Road Atlanta	**(Finland) JJ Lehto** **(United Kingdom) Johnny Herbert**	(United States) Jon Field (United States) Duncan Dayton (United States) Larry Connor	(Switzerland) Alain Menu (Czech Republic) Tomáš Enge (Netherlands) Peter Kox	(Germany) Jörg Bergmeister (Germany) Timo Bernhard (France) Romain Dumas	Results

== Championship results ==
Points are awarded to the top 10 finishers in the following order:

- 20-16-13-10-8-6-4-3-2-1

Exceptions being for the 12 Hours of Sebring and Petit Le Mans which award the top 10 finishers in the following order:

- 26-22-19-16-14-12-10-9-8-7

Cars failing to complete 70% of the winner's distance are not awarded points. Teams only score the points of their highest finishing entry in each race.

Points systems
Race	1st	2nd	3rd	4th	5th	6th	7th	8th	9th	10th
Normal	20	16	13	10	8	6	4	3	2	1
1000+ km	26	22	19	16	14	12	10	9	8	7

=== LMP900 Drivers' Championship ===
Pos.	Driver	Team	SEB (United States)	ATL (United States)	SON (United States)	TRO (Canada)	MOS (Canada)	ROA (United States)	LAG (United States)	MIA (United States)	ATL (United States)	Pts.
1	(Germany) Frank Biela	(Germany) Infineon Team Joest	1	2	1	1	1	3	1	2	3	170
1	(Germany) Marco Werner	(Germany) Infineon Team Joest	1	2	1	1	1	3	1	2	3	170
3	(Finland) J.J. Lehto	(United States) Champion Racing	2	1	2	2	4	1	3	1	1	163
4	(United Kingdom) Johnny Herbert	(United Kingdom) Team Bentley	3									160
4	(United Kingdom) Johnny Herbert	(United States) Champion Racing		1	2	2	4	1	3	1	1	160
5	(Monaco) Olivier Beretta	(United States) JML Team Panoz	5	4	4	3	3	2	2	3	2	127
6	(Belgium) David Saelens	(United States) JML Team Panoz		Ret	5	3	3	2	2	3	2	101
7	(United States) Gunnar Jeannette	(United States) JML Team Panoz	5	Ret	4	4	2	4	DNS	6	4	82
8	(United States) Michael Lewis	(United States) American Spirit Racing	9	6	Ret	5	Ret	6	4	5	5	60
8	(United States) Tomy Drissi	(United States) American Spirit Racing	9	6	Ret	5	Ret	6	4	5	5	60
10	(Canada) Scott Maxwell	(United States) JML Team Panoz	8			4	2			6	4	57
11	(United States) Clint Field	(United States) Intersport Racing	DSQ	5	6	6	Ret	5	5	4	Ret	46
11	(Italy) Max Papis	(United States) JML Team Panoz	5	4							2	46
13	(Switzerland) Benjamin Leuenberger	(United States) JML Team Panoz	8		5			4	DNS		4	43
14	(Belgium) Didier Theys	(United States) Doran Lista Racing	7	3	3							36
15	(Austria) Philipp Peter	(Germany) Infineon Team Joest	1									26
16	(United States) Mike Durand	(United States) Intersport Racing		5		6				4	Ret	24
17	(Belgium) Eric van de Poele	(United States) Doran Lista Racing	7	3								23
18	(Italy) Emanuele Pirro	(United States) Champion Racing	2									22
18	(Sweden) Stefan Johansson	(United States) Champion Racing	2									22
18	(United States) Rick Sutherland	(United States) Intersport Racing	DSQ		6			5	5			22
21	(Australia) David Brabham	(United Kingdom) Team Bentley	3									19
21	(United Kingdom) Mark Blundell	(United Kingdom) Team Bentley	3									19
23	(Denmark) Tom Kristensen	(United Kingdom) Team Bentley	4									16
23	(United Kingdom) Guy Smith	(United Kingdom) Team Bentley	4									16
23	(Italy) Rinaldo Capello	(United Kingdom) Team Bentley	4									16
26	(Canada) Melanie Paterson	(United States) American Spirit Racing									5	14
27	(United States) Bill Auberlen	(United States) Doran Lista Racing			3							13
28	(Finland) Mika Salo	(United Kingdom) Audi Sport UK	6									12
28	(United Kingdom) Jonny Kane	(United Kingdom) Audi Sport UK	6									12
28	(United Kingdom) Perry McCarthy	(United Kingdom) Audi Sport UK	6									12
31	(Switzerland) Fredy Lienhard	(United States) Doran Lista Racing	7									10
32	(Canada) John Graham	(United States) JML Team Panoz	8									9
33	(United States) Guy Cosmo	(United States) American Spirit Racing	9									8
34	(United States) Larry Oberto	(United Kingdom) Taurus Sports Racing	10								Ret	7
34	(United Kingdom) Phil Andrews	(United Kingdom) Taurus Sports Racing	10									7
34	(United Kingdom) Justin Keen	(United Kingdom) Taurus Sports Racing	10									7
-	(United States) Jim Matthews	(United States) Jim Matthews Racing	Ret									0
-	(Belgium) Marc Goossens	(United States) Jim Matthews Racing	Ret									0
-	(Denmark) Jan Magnussen	(United States) Jim Matthews Racing	Ret									0
-	(United States) Allen Ziegelman	(United States) Sezio Florida Racing Team	Ret									0
-	(France) Patrice Roussel	(United States) Sezio Florida Racing Team	Ret									0
-	(United Kingdom) Ian James	(United States) Sezio Florida Racing Team	Ret									0
-	(United States) Bryan Herta	(United Kingdom) Team Nasamax	Ret									0
-	(Canada) Robbie Stirling	(United Kingdom) Team Nasamax	Ret									0
-	(France) Romain Dumas	(United Kingdom) Team Nasamax	Ret									0
-	(United Kingdom) Jamie Campbell-Walter	(United Kingdom) Lister Storm Racing	Ret									0
-	(United Kingdom) Ian MacKellar	(United Kingdom) Lister Storm Racing	Ret									0
-	(France) Georges Forgeois	(United States) Intersport Racing					Ret					0
-	(United States) John Macaluso	(United States) Intersport Racing	DSQ									0
Pos.	Driver	Team	SEB (United States)	ATL (United States)	SON (United States)	TRO (Canada)	MOS (Canada)	ROA (United States)	LAG (United States)	MIA (United States)	ATL (United States)	Pts.

=== LMP900 Teams Championship ===
Teams only score the points of their highest finishing entry in each race.

Pos.	Team	No.	SEB (United States)	ATL (United States)	SON (United States)	TRO (Canada)	MOS (Canada)	ROA (United States)	LAG (United States)	MIA (United States)	ATL (United States)	Pts.
1	(Germany) Infineon Team Joest	1	1	2	1	1	1	3	1	2	3	170
2	(United States) Champion Racing	38	2	1	2	2	4	1	3	1	1	163
3	(United States) JML Team Panoz	10	5	4	4	3	3	2	2	3	2	130
3	(United States) JML Team Panoz	11	8	Ret	5	4	2	4	DNS	6	4	130
4	(United States) American Spirit Racing	12	9	6	Ret	5	Ret	6	4	5	5	60
5	(United States) Intersport Racing	30	DSQ	5	6	6	Ret	5	5	4	Ret	46
6	(United States) Doran Lista Racing	27	7	3	3							36
7	(United Kingdom) Team Bentley	7	3									19
7	(United Kingdom) Team Bentley	8	4									19
8	(United Kingdom) Audi Sport UK	9	6									12
9	(United Kingdom) Taurus Sports Racing	77	10									7
-	(United States) Jim Matthews Racing	36	Ret									0
-	(United States) Sezio Florida Racing Team	87	Ret									0
-	(United Kingdom) Team Nasamax	01	Ret									0
-	(United Kingdom) Lister Storm Racing	6	Ret									0
Pos.	Team		SEB (United States)	ATL (United States)	SON (United States)	TRO (Canada)	MOS (Canada)	ROA (United States)	LAG (United States)	MIA (United States)	ATL (United States)	Pts.

==== LMP675 Drivers' Championship ====
Pos.	Driver	Team	SEB (United States)	ATL (United States)	SON (United States)	TRO (Canada)	MOS (Canada)	ROA (United States)	LAG (United States)	MIA (United States)	ATL (United States)	Pts.
1	(United States) Chris Dyson	(United States) Dyson Racing Team	1	3	2	Ret	1	1	Ret	1	2	137
2	(United States) Jon Field	(United States) Intersport Racing	2	1	DNS	1	Ret	4	3	4	1	121
2	(United States) Duncan Dayton	(United States) Intersport Racing	2	1	DNS	1	Ret	4	3	4	1	121
4	(United States) Jason Workman	(United States) Marshall Cooke Racing	Ret									108
4	(United States) Jason Workman	(United States) Essex Racing		5	3	2	4	2	2	3	4	108
5	(United Kingdom) Andy Wallace	(United States) Dyson Racing Team	Ret	3	2	Ret	1	1	Ret	1	Ret	89
6	(United Kingdom) James Weaver	(United States) Dyson Racing Team	Ret	2	1	Ret	3	Ret	1	2	Ret	85
6	(United States) Butch Leitzinger	(United States) Dyson Racing Team	Ret	2	1	Ret	3	Ret	1	2	Ret	85
8	(Belgium) Didier de Radiguès	(United States) Dyson Racing Team	1								2	48
8	(United States) Chad Block	(United States) Dyson Racing Team	1								2	48
10	(United States) Scott Bradley	(United States) Essex Racing							2	3	4	45
11	(United States) Howard Katz	(United States) Downing-Atlanta Inc.		4				3			3	42
11	(United States) Jim Downing	(United States) Downing-Atlanta Inc.		4				3			3	42
13	(Canada) Melanie Paterson	(United States) Marshall Cooke Racing	Ret									34
13	(Canada) Melanie Paterson	(United States) Essex Racing		5		2	4					34
14	(United States) Larry Connor	(United States) Intersport Racing									1	26
15	(United States) Bryan Willman	(United States) Team Bucknum Racing	Ret	Ret	Ret	Ret	2	5	Ret	Ret	Ret	24
15	(United States) Chris McMurry	(United States) Team Bucknum Racing	Ret	Ret	Ret	Ret	2	5	Ret	Ret	Ret	24
15	(United States) Jeff Bucknum	(United States) Team Bucknum Racing	Ret	Ret	Ret	Ret	2	5	Ret	Ret		24
18	(United States) Mike Durand	(United States) Intersport Racing	2									22
19	(Japan) Yojiro Terada	(United States) Downing-Atlanta Inc.									3	19
20	(United States) James Gue	(United States) Essex Racing						2				16
20	(United States) Andrew Davis	(United States) Essex Racing									4	16
22	(Canada) David McEntee	(United States) Essex Racing			3							13
-	(Japan) Hayanari Shimoda	(United Kingdom) RN Motorsports	Ret									0
-	(Denmark) John Nielsen	(United Kingdom) RN Motorsports	Ret									0
-	(United Kingdom) Ben Devlin	(United States) Marshall Cooke Racing	Ret									0
-	(United States) Joe Blacker	(United States) AB Motorsport		Ret								0
-	(United States) John Burke	(United States) AB Motorsport		Ret								0
-	(United States) Alan Rudolph	(United States) Team Bucknum Racing									Ret	0
Pos.	Driver	Team	SEB (United States)	ATL (United States)	SON (United States)	TRO (Canada)	MOS (Canada)	ROA (United States)	LAG (United States)	MIA (United States)	ATL (United States)	Pts.

==== LMP675 Teams Championship ====
Teams only score the points of their highest finishing entry in each race.

Pos.	Team	No.	SEB (United States)	ATL (United States)	SON (United States)	TRO (Canada)	MOS (Canada)	ROA (United States)	LAG (United States)	MIA (United States)	ATL (United States)	Pts.
1	(United States) Dyson Racing Team	16	Ret	2	1	Ret	3	Ret	1	2	Ret	164
1	(United States) Dyson Racing Team	20	1	3	2	Ret	1	1	Ret	1	2	164
2	(United States) Intersport Racing	37	2	1	DNS	1	Ret	4	3	4	1	121
3	(United States) Essex Racing	18		5	3	2	4	2	2	3	4	108
4	(United States) Downing-Atlanta Inc.	64		4				3			3	42
5	(United States) Team Bucknum Racing	56	Ret	Ret	Ret	Ret	2	5	Ret	Ret	Ret	24
-	(United States) Marshall Cooke Racing	18	Ret									0
-	(United Kingdom) RN Motorsports	15	Ret									0
-	(United States) AB Motorsport	77		Ret								0
Pos.	Team		SEB (United States)	ATL (United States)	SON (United States)	TRO (Canada)	MOS (Canada)	ROA (United States)	LAG (United States)	MIA (United States)	ATL (United States)	Pts.

==== GTS Drivers' Championship ====
Pos.	Driver	Team	SEB (United States)	ATL (United States)	SON (United States)	TRO (Canada)	MOS (Canada)	ROA (United States)	LAG (United States)	MIA (United States)	ATL (United States)	Pts.
1	(Canada) Ron Fellows	(United States) Corvette Racing	1	3	1	2	1	2	2	4	5	151
1	(United States) Johnny O'Connell	(United States) Corvette Racing	1	3	1	2	1	2	2	4	5	151
3	(Australia) David Brabham	(United Kingdom) Prodrive			3	4	3	1	1	1	2	118
4	(United Kingdom) Oliver Gavin	(United States) Corvette Racing	3	1	2	1	Ret	5	3	DNS	3	115
4	(United States) Kelly Collins	(United States) Corvette Racing	3	1	2	1	Ret	5	3	DNS	3	115
6	(Denmark) Jan Magnussen	(United Kingdom) Prodrive			3	4	3	1	1		2	98
7	(Czech Republic) Tomáš Enge	(United Kingdom) Prodrive	Ret	2	4	Ret	2	3	DSQ	2	1	97
7	(Netherlands) Peter Kox	(United Kingdom) Prodrive	Ret	2	4	Ret	2	3	DSQ	2	1	97
9	(Italy) Emanuele Naspetti	(Italy) Team Olive Garden	Ret	5	5	3	4	4	4	3	Ret	72
10	(Italy) Mimmo Schiattarella	(Italy) Team Olive Garden	Ret	5	5	3	4	4	4	3	Ret	62
11	(United Kingdom) Anthony Davidson	(United Kingdom) Prodrive	2								2	44
12	(United Kingdom) Darren Turner	(United Kingdom) Prodrive	2							1		42
13	(France) Franck Fréon	(United States) Corvette Racing	1								5	40
14	(France) Jean-Philippe Belloc	(United States) Carsport America	4	DNS	6		5	DNS	5	Ret	Ret	38
14	(United States) Andy Pilgrim	(United States) Corvette Racing	3								3	38
16	(United States) Tom Weickardt	(United States) Carsport America	4	DNS	DNP		5	7	5	Ret	Ret	36
17	(France) Jérôme Policand	(United Kingdom) Prodrive		4							4	26
17	(Switzerland) Alain Menu	(United Kingdom) Prodrive									1	26
19	(United Kingdom) Kelvin Burt	(United Kingdom) Prodrive	2									22
20	(United States) Jeff Altenburg	(United States) Carsport America	4		DNP			DNS				16
20	(Switzerland) Frédéric Dor	(United Kingdom) Prodrive									4	16
20	(Netherlands) Jan Lammers	(United Kingdom) Prodrive									4	16
23	(United States) Danica Patrick	(United Kingdom) Prodrive		4								10
23	(United States) Bill Auberlen	(Italy) Team Olive Garden										10
25	(Canada) Aaron Povoledo	(United States) Carsport America			6							6
25	(Austria) Franz Konrad	(Germany) Konrad Motorsport	Ret					6		Ret		6
25	(Germany) Wolfgang Kaufmann	(Germany) Konrad Motorsport						6				6
28	(United States) Joe Ellis	(United States) Carsport America						7				4
28	(United States) Romeo Kapudija	(United States) Carsport America						7				4
-	(United Kingdom) Robert Nearn	(Germany) Konrad Motorsport	Ret							Ret		0
-	(Switzerland) Toni Seiler	(Germany) Konrad Motorsport	Ret									0
-	(United Kingdom) Jamie Davies	(United Kingdom) Prodrive	Ret									0
-	(Brazil) Thomas Erdos	(United Kingdom) Graham Nash Motorsport	Ret									0
-	(Portugal) Pedro Chaves	(United Kingdom) Graham Nash Motorsport	Ret									0
-	(United Kingdom) Gavin Pickering	(United Kingdom) Graham Nash Motorsport	Ret									0
-	(Venezuela) Johnny Cecotto	(Italy) Team Olive Garden	Ret									0
-	(Netherlands) Mike Hezemans	(United States) Carsport America	Ret									0
-	(Belgium) Anthony Kumpen	(United States) Carsport America	Ret									0
-	(United States) Mark Neuhaus	(Germany) Konrad Motorsport					Ret					0
-	(Austria) Walter Lechner Jr.	(Germany) Konrad Motorsport					Ret					0
-	(France) Éric Cayrolle	(United States) Carsport America									Ret	0
-	(Switzerland) Joël Camathias	(Italy) Team Olive Garden									Ret	0
Pos.	Driver	Team	SEB (United States)	ATL (United States)	SON (United States)	TRO (Canada)	MOS (Canada)	ROA (United States)	LAG (United States)	MIA (United States)	ATL (United States)	Pts.

==== GTS Teams Championship ====
Teams only score the points of their highest finishing entry in each race.

Pos.	Team	No.	SEB (United States)	ATL (United States)	SON (United States)	TRO (Canada)	MOS (Canada)	ROA (United States)	LAG (United States)	MIA (United States)	ATL (United States)	Pts.
1	(United States) Corvette Racing	3	1	3	1	2	1	2	2	4	5	167
1	(United States) Corvette Racing	4	3	1	2	1	Ret	5	3	DNS	3	167
2	(United Kingdom) Prodrive	08									4	163
2	(United Kingdom) Prodrive	80	2	4	3	4	3	1	1	1	2	163
2	(United Kingdom) Prodrive	88	Ret	2	4	Ret	2	3	DSQ	2	1	163
3	(Italy) Team Olive Garden	0	Ret	5	5	3	4	4	4	3	Ret	72
4	(United States) Carsport America	17	Ret		DNP		DNP	Ret	DNP			42
4	(United States) Carsport America	71	4	DNS	6		5	DNS	5	Ret	Ret	42
5	(Germany) Konrad Motorsport	2	Ret				Ret	6		Ret		6
-	(United Kingdom) Graham Nash Motorsport	83	Ret									0
Pos.	Team		SEB (United States)	ATL (United States)	SON (United States)	TRO (Canada)	MOS (Canada)	ROA (United States)	LAG (United States)	MIA (United States)	ATL (United States)	Pts.

==== GT Drivers' Championship ====
Pos.	Driver	Team	SEB (United States)	ATL (United States)	SON (United States)	TRO (Canada)	MOS (Canada)	ROA (United States)	LAG (United States)	MIA (United States)	ATL (United States)	Pts.
1	(Germany) Sascha Maassen	(United States) Alex Job Racing	1	2	1	1	4	4	1	1	2	164
1	(Germany) Lucas Lühr	(United States) Alex Job Racing	1	2	1	1	4	4	1	1	2	164
3	(Germany) Timo Bernhard	(United States) Alex Job Racing	5	1	2	Ret	1	Ret	9	6	1	104
3	(Germany) Jörg Bergmeister	(United States) Alex Job Racing	5	1	2	Ret	1	Ret	9	6	1	104
5	(Germany) Ralf Kelleners	(United States) Risi Competizione	Ret	Ret	3	2	2	Ret	2	2	3	96
5	(United States) Anthony Lazzaro	(United States) Risi Competizione	Ret	Ret	3	2	2	Ret	2	2	3	96
7	(United States) Cort Wagner	(United States) The Racer's Group	6	3	4	Ret	Ret	2	5	9	4	77
8	(United States) Kevin Buckler	(United States) The Racer's Group	8	3	4	Ret	Ret	2	5	9	4	74
9	(United Kingdom) Johnny Mowlem	(United States) Petersen Motorsports	2		5			1	3	4	Ret	73
9	(United States) Craig Stanton	(United States) Petersen Motorsports	2		5			1	3	4	Ret	73
11	(Italy) Alex Caffi	(Germany) Seikel Motorsport	3									51
11	(Italy) Alex Caffi	(United Kingdom) P.K. Sport							4	3	8	51
11	(United States) Justin Jackson	(United States) J-3 Racing	Ret	4	6	3	6	9	Ret	Ret	5	51
11	(United States) David Murry	(United States) J-3 Racing	Ret	4	6	3	6	9	Ret	Ret	5	51
14	(United Kingdom) Robin Liddell	(United Kingdom) P.K. Sport	Ret	6	Ret	Ret	5	Ret	4	3	8	46
15	(United States) Shane Lewis	(United States) ACEMCO Motorsports	Ret	5	13	4	8	8	7	8	7	41
16	(France) Stéphane Grégoire	(United States) JMB Racing USA	4	8	11	Ret	10	Ret	6	5	Ret	34
17	(United States) Terry Borcheller	(United States) Risi Competizione	Ret									33
17	(United States) Terry Borcheller	(United States) ACEMCO Motorsports			13	4	8	8	7	8	7	33
18	(United States) Spencer Pumpelly	(United States) ZIP Racing	10	Ret	Ret	5		3	Ret	7	Ret	32
18	(United States) Andy Lally	(United States) ZIP Racing	10	Ret	Ret	5		3	Ret	7	Ret	32
20	(United States) Peter Baron	(United States) Orbit	Ret	10	7	7	3		14	Ret	10	29
21	(France) Romain Dumas	(United States) Alex Job Racing									1	26
22	(Sweden) Niclas Jönsson	(United States) Petersen Motorsports	2									22
22	(Sweden) Niclas Jönsson	(United States) Alegra Motorsports								Ret		22
23	(United States) Marc Bunting	(United States) The Racer's Group	6	11	14	8	9	7	8	Ret		21
23	(United States) Chris Gleason	(United States) The Racer's Group	6	Ret	14	8	9	7	8	Ret		21
23	(Chile) Eliseo Salazar	(United States) The Racer's Group	8									21
23	(Chile) Eliseo Salazar	(United States) JMB Racing USA		8	11	Ret	10		6	5		21
23	(United States) Joe Policastro	(United States) Orbit	9	9	9			11	11	10	9	21
23	(United States) Jay Policastro	(United States) Orbit	9	9	9			11	11	10	9	21
28	(Italy) Gabrio Rosa	(Germany) Seikel Motorsport	3									19
28	(Switzerland) Andrea Chiesa	(Germany) Seikel Motorsport	3									19
30	(Germany) Marc Lieb	(United States) Orbit	Ret			7	3	Ret		Ret		17
31	(Italy) Fabio Babini	(United States) JMB Racing USA	4									16
31	(Italy) Christian Pescatori	(United States) JMB Racing USA	4			Ret						16
31	(United States) Patrick Long	(United States) The Racer's Group									4	16
34	(Switzerland) Iradj Alexander	(United States) JMB Racing USA					10	Ret	6			15
35	(United States) Brian Cunningham	(United States) J-3 Racing	Ret								5	14
36	(United States) Vic Rice	(United States) The Racer's Group	11									13
36	(United States) Vic Rice	(United Kingdom) P.K. Sport		7	12	Ret	5	10	12		11	13
37	(United States) Michael Schrom	(United States) The Racer's Group	11	11	8	Ret	11	5	10			12
37	(Germany) Pierre Ehret	(United States) The Racer's Group	11	11	8			5	10	11	Ret	12
37	(United States) Leo Hindery	(United States) Orbit	Ret	10	7			11	14		10	12
37	(United States) Bill Auberlen	(United States) Alegra Motorsports								Ret		12
37	(United States) Bill Auberlen	(United States) Yokohama/ADVAN									6	12
37	(Germany) Hans-Joachim Stuck	(United States) Yokohama/ADVAN									6	12
37	(United States) Boris Said	(United States) Alegra Motorsports	Ret									12
37	(United States) Boris Said	(United States) Yokohama/ADVAN									6	12
43	(United Kingdom) Rob Barff	(United Kingdom) Racesport Salisbury	7									10
43	(United Kingdom) Richard Hay	(United Kingdom) Racesport Salisbury	7									10
43	(United Kingdom) Richard Stanton	(United Kingdom) Racesport Salisbury	7									10
43	(United States) Darren Law	(United States) ACEMCO Motorsports									7	10
47	(United States) Jim Pace	(United States) The Racer's Group	8									9
47	(United Kingdom) David Warnock	(United Kingdom) P.K. Sport	Ret						12	Ret	8	9
49	(United States) Mike Fitzgerald	(United States) Orbit	9									8
49	(United States) Andrew Davis	(United States) ACEMCO Motorsports	Ret	5								8
49	(United States) Randy Pobst	(United States) Orbit									9	8
52	(Brazil) Oswaldo Negri, Jr.	(United States) Inline Cunningham Racing			10	6			Ret		12	7
52	(United States) Scott Bader	(United States) Inline Cunningham Racing			10	6						7
52	(United States) Steven Ivankovich	(United States) ZIP Racing	10									7
52	(Germany) Mike Rockenfeller	(United States) Orbit									10	7
56	(France) Jean-Philippe Belloc	(United Kingdom) P.K. Sport		6								6
56	(United States) Philip Collin	(Germany) Seikel Motorsport	13	12				6			Ret	6
56	(United States) John Lloyd	(Germany) Seikel Motorsport	13					6				6
59	(United Kingdom) Piers Masarati	(United Kingdom) P.K. Sport	Ret	7			12	10				5
60	(Italy) Mauro Baldi	(United States) Ferri Competizione					7					4
60	(Italy) Andrea Bertolini	(United States) Ferri Competizione					7					4
60	(United States) Romeo Kapudija	(United States) ZIP Racing								7		4
60	(United States) Romeo Kapudija	(United Kingdom) P.K. Sport									11	4
-	(United States) Jeff Zwart	(United States) The Racer's Group								11	Ret	0
-	(Canada) Jeffrey Pabst	(United States) The Racer's Group					11					0
-	(United States) Jon Groom	(United Kingdom) P.K. Sport									11	0
-	(United States) Stephen Earle	(United States) JMB Racing USA	12						13	Ret	Ret	0
-	(Italy) Andrea Garbagnati	(United States) JMB Racing USA	12		Ret							0
-	(Italy) Ludovico Manfredi	(United States) JMB Racing USA	12		Ret							0
-	(Canada) Tony Burgess	(Germany) Seikel Motorsport		12			Ret				Ret	0
-	(United States) Burt Frisselle	(United States) Inline Cunningham Racing							Ret		12	0
-	(United States) Keith Alexander	(United Kingdom) P.K. Sport			12							0
-	(Canada) John Graham	(United Kingdom) P.K. Sport					12					0
-	(Canada) David Shep	(Germany) Seikel Motorsport	13				Ret					0
-	(Netherlands) Peter Kutemann	(United States) JMB Racing USA					13	Ret				0
-	(United States) Mark Neuhaus	(United States) JMB Racing USA							13	Ret		0
-	(France) Antoine Gosse	(United States) JMB Racing USA					13					0
-	(United States) Brad Nyberg	(United States) Hyper Sport	Ret	Ret	Ret	DNS			Ret	Ret	Ret	0
-	(United States) Rick Skelton	(United States) Hyper Sport	Ret	Ret	Ret	DNS			Ret	Ret	Ret	0
-	(United States) Joe Foster	(United States) Hyper Sport	Ret	Ret	Ret	DNS			Ret		Ret	0
-	(Australia) Alex Davison	(United Kingdom) P.K. Sport			Ret	Ret		Ret				0
-	(United States) Carlos DeQuesada	(United States) Alegra Motorsports	Ret							Ret		0
-	(United States) Philip Shearer	(United States) JMB Racing USA						Ret			Ret	0
-	(France) Georges Forgeois	(Germany) T2M Motorsport	Ret									0
-	(United States) Derek Clark	(Germany) T2M Motorsport	Ret									0
-	(United States) Chip Vance	(Germany) T2M Motorsport	Ret									0
-	(United Kingdom) Marino Franchitti	(United States) Risi Competizione	Ret									0
-	(United Kingdom) Kevin McGarrity	(United States) Risi Competizione	Ret									0
-	(United Kingdom) Ian Donaldson	(United Kingdom) P.K. Sport	Ret									0
-	(United Kingdom) Bart Hayden	(United Kingdom) P.K. Sport	Ret									0
-	(United Kingdom) Gregor Fisken	(United Kingdom) P.K. Sport	Ret									0
-	(United States) B. J. Zacharias	(United States) ACEMCO Motorsports	Ret									0
-	(United States) Catersby Jones	(United States) Alegra Motorsports	Ret									0
-	(Germany) Norman Simon	(Netherlands) Spyker Squadron	Ret									0
-	(Netherlands) Hans Hugenholtz	(Netherlands) Spyker Squadron	Ret									0
-	(Belgium) Patrick van Schoote	(Netherlands) Spyker Squadron	Ret									0
-	(Austria) Walter Lechner, Jr.	(Germany) RWS-Yukos Motorsport	Ret									0
-	(France) Stéphane Daoudi	(Germany) RWS-Yukos Motorsport	Ret									0
-	(Russia) Nikolai Fomenko	(Germany) RWS-Yukos Motorsport	Ret									0
-	(Canada) Jean-Francois Dumoulin	(United States) The Racer's Group				Ret						0
-	(United States) Ron Atapattu	(United Kingdom) P.K. Sport								Ret		0
-	(United States) Ross Bluestein	(United States) Alegra Motorsports								Ret		0
-	(New Zealand) Andrew Bagnall	(Germany) Seikel Motorsport									Ret	0
-	(United States) Tom Nastasi	(United States) The Racer's Group									Ret	0
-	(United States) David Donner	(United States) The Racer's Group									Ret	0
-	(United States) Michael Petersen	(United States) Petersen Motorsports									Ret	0
-	(United States) Emil Assentato	(United States) ZIP Racing	DNS									0
-	(United States) Nick Longhi	(United States) ZIP Racing	DNS									0
-	(United States) Brent Sherman	(United States) ZIP Racing	DNS									0
Pos.	Driver	Team	SEB (United States)	ATL (United States)	SON (United States)	TRO (Canada)	MOS (Canada)	ROA (United States)	LAG (United States)	MIA (United States)	ATL (United States)	Pts.

==== GT Teams Championship ====
Teams only score the points of their highest finishing entry in each race.

Pos.	Team	No.	SEB (United States)	ATL (United States)	SON (United States)	TRO (Canada)	MOS (Canada)	ROA (United States)	LAG (United States)	MIA (United States)	ATL (United States)	Pts.
1	(United States) Alex Job Racing	23	1	2	1	1	4	4	1	1	2	182
1	(United States) Alex Job Racing	24	5	1	2	Ret	1	Ret	9	6	1	182
2	(United States) Risi Competizione	34	Ret									96
2	(United States) Risi Competizione	35	Ret	Ret	3	2	2	Ret	2	2	3	96
3	(United States) The Racer's Group	66	8	3	4	Ret	Ret	2	5	9	4	79
3	(United States) The Racer's Group	67	11	11	8	Ret	11	5	10	11	Ret	79
3	(United States) The Racer's Group	68	6	Ret	14	8	9	7	8	13	Ret	79
4	(United States) Petersen Motorsports	31	2		5			1	3	4	Ret	73
5	(United States) J-3 Racing	79	Ret	4	6	3	6	9	Ret	14	5	51
6	(United Kingdom) P.K. Sport	60	Ret	6	Ret	Ret	5	Ret	4	3	8	47
6	(United Kingdom) P.K. Sport	61	Ret	7	12	Ret	12	10	12	Ret	11	47
7	(United States) ACEMCO Motorsports	63	Ret	5	13	4	8	8	7	8	7	41
8	(United States) Orbit	42	9	9	9			11	11	10	9	40
8	(United States) Orbit	43	Ret	10	7	7	3	Ret	14	Ret	10	40
9	(United States) JMB Racing USA	28	4	8	11	Ret	10	Ret	6	5	DNS	34
9	(United States) JMB Racing USA	29	12		Ret		13	Ret	13	12		34
9	(United States) ZIP Racing	33	10	Ret	Ret	5		3	Ret	7		32
9	(United States) ZIP Racing	39	DNS									32
11	(Germany) Seikel Motorsport	52	13	12			Ret	6			Ret	25
11	(Germany) Seikel Motorsport	53	3									25
12	(United States) Yokohama/ADVAN	6									6	12
13	(United Kingdom) Racesport Salisbury	41	7									10
14	(United States) Inline Cunningham Racing	89			10	6			Ret		12	7
15	(United States) Ferri Competizione	32					7					4
-	(United States) Hyper Sport	03	Ret	Ret	Ret	DNS			Ret	Ret	Ret	0
-	(United States) Alegra Motorsports	40	Ret							Ret		0
-	(United States) Alegra Motorsports	41								Ret		0
-	(Germany) T2M Motorsport	78	Ret									0
-	(Netherlands) Spyker Squadron	48	Ret									0
-	(Germany) RWS-Yukos Motorsport	07	Ret									0
Pos.	Team		SEB (United States)	ATL (United States)	SON (United States)	TRO (Canada)	MOS (Canada)	ROA (United States)	LAG (United States)	MIA (United States)	ATL (United States)	Pts.
