= New Hampshire Indy 225 =

IndyCar race at New Hampshire Motor Speedway

IndyCar Series
- Venue: New Hampshire Motor Speedway
- First race: 1992
- First ICS race: 1996
- Last race: 2011
- Distance: 238.05 mi (383.10 km)
- Laps: 225
- Previous names: New England 200 (1992-1993, 1995); Slick-50 200 (1994); True Value 200 (1996); Pennzoil 200 (1997); New England Indy 200 (1998); MoveThatBlock.com Indy 225 (2011)
- Most wins (driver): no repeat winners
- Most wins (team): Team Menard (2)

The New Hampshire Indy 225 was an IndyCar race at the New Hampshire Motor Speedway in Loudon, New Hampshire. It was held as a CART Champ Car event from 1992 until 1995, switching to the Indy Racing League for the 1996–97 season. On June 21, 2010, it was announced that the IndyCar Series would return to New Hampshire for the 2011 season. When the IndyCar Series returned to New Hampshire Motor Speedway the race was scheduled to be 225 laps. A Firestone Indy Lights and NASCAR Whelen Modified Tour race accompanied the feature. The race did not return for the 2012 IndyCar Series season.

== Race results ==
| Season | Date | Driver | Team | Chassis | Engine | Race Distance | | Race Time | Average Speed (mph) | Report | Ref |
| Season | Date | Driver | Team | Chassis | Engine | Laps | Miles (km) | Race Time | Average Speed (mph) | Report | Ref |
CART PPG Indy Car World Series
| 1992 | July 5 | (United States) Bobby Rahal | Rahal/Hogan Racing | Lola | Chevrolet-Ilmor | 200 | 211.6 (340.537) | 1:35:00 | 133.621 | Report | |
| 1993 | August 8 | (United Kingdom) Nigel Mansell | Newman/Haas Racing | Lola | Ford-Cosworth | 200 | 211.6 (340.537) | 1:37:33 | 130.148 | Report | |
| 1994 | August 21 | (United States) Al Unser Jr. | Penske Racing | Penske | Mercedes-Benz-Ilmor | 200 | 211.6 (340.537) | 1:43:31 | 122.635 | Report | |
| 1995 | August 20 | (Brazil) André Ribeiro | Tasman Motorsports | Reynard | Honda | 200 | 211.6 (340.537) | 1:34:36 | 134.203 | Report | |
IndyCar Series
| 1996-97 | Aug 18, 1996 | (United States) Scott Sharp* | A. J. Foyt Enterprises | Lola | Ford-Cosworth | 200 | 211.6 (340.537) | 1:36:58 | 130.934 | Report | |
| 1996-97 | Aug 17, 1997 | (United States) Robbie Buhl | Team Menard | G-Force | Oldsmobile | 200 | 211.6 (340.537) | 1:46:51 | 118.829 | Report | |
| 1998 | June 28 | (United States) Tony Stewart | Team Menard | Dallara | Oldsmobile | 200 | 211.6 (340.537) | 1:51:30 | 113.861 | Report | |
| 1999 – 2010 | Not held | | | | | | | | | | |
| 2011 | August 14 | (United States) Ryan Hunter-Reay | Andretti Autosport | Dallara | Honda | 215* | 227.47 (366.077) | 1:58:02 | 112.03 | Report | |

=== Race recaps ===
- 1996: Scott Sharp won his first career Indycar race, and won the first race for owner A. J. Foyt since the 1981 Pocono 500. Tony Stewart had led 165 laps and had a nearly three-lap lead over second place, but coasted into the pits with 18 laps to go. Scott Sharp took over the lead, and stretched his fuel to the finish.
- 2011: Indy-style racing returned to New Hampshire after a 13-year sabbatical. The race was scheduled for 225 laps / 238.05 miles. Rain affected the race, bringing out the caution on two lengthy occasions. With 5 laps to go, officials attempted to restart the race and finish under green. The track, however, was too moist for racing, and Danica Patrick immediately spun on the frontstretch, which led to a controversial five-car pileup. Officials accepted blame for the decision, and reverted final scoring back to the previous standings prior to the restart attempt. The official race distance was 215 laps / 227.47 miles.

== Indy Lights ==
| Season | Date | Winning driver | Ref |
CART-sanctioned Lights race winners
| 1992 | July 5 | (Mexico) Adrián Fernández | |
| 1993 | August 8 | (United Kingdom) Steve Robertson | |
| 1994 | August 21 | (Canada) Greg Moore | |
| 1995 | August 20 | (Canada) Greg Moore | |
IndyCar-sanctioned Lights race winners
| 2011 | August 14 | (United States) Josef Newgarden | |

== USF2000 ==
| Season | Date | Winning driver |
USAC FF2000 Eastern Division Championship
| 1993 | August 22 | (United States) Chris Simmons |
USAC FF2000 National Championship
| 1994 | August 20 | (United States) Chris Simmons |
USF2000 National Championship
| 1995 | August 19 | (United States) Jeret Schroeder |
| 1996 | August 18 | (Canada) Bruno Bianchi |

== Whelen Modified Tour (Indy weekend only) ==
Since 1994, the NASCAR Whelen Modified Tour has joined the open-wheel card, typically racing as part of the Indy weekend. The series usually participates in all major race weekends at the circuit.

| Season | Date | Winning driver |
|---|---|---|
| 1994 | August 21 | (United States) Steve Park |
| 1995 | August 20 | (United States) Mike Stefanik |
| 1996 | August 18 | (United States) Tony Hirschman |
| 1997 | August 16 | (United States) Jan Leaty |
| 1998 | June 28 | (United States) Mike Stefanik |
| 2011 | August 13 | (United States) Mike Stefanik |
