= Bruno Bianchi (racing driver) =

Canadian former racing driver

Bruno Bianchi is a Canadian former racing driver. Bianchi won races in Formula Ford 1600 in Canada and Formula Ford 2000 in USA. After his racing career, Bianchi was an engineer at Bombardier Inc. and Bell Helicopter and Airbus.

== Racing career ==
Bianchi, racing out of Lachenaie, Quebec, started in the 1989 season of the Quebec Formula Ford championship at Mosport Park, Ontario, Canada in his Swift DB3. Bianchi competed the full season in 1990 in a Swift DB3. Two third places, at Mosport Park and Circuit Mont-Tremblant, were his best results. He secured the fourteenth place in the championship standings. The Canadian returned in 1991 and 1992 finishing tenth both years.

In 1993, Bianchi scored one win and another five podium finished to secure the third place in the Canadian Formula Ford championship. His sole race win came at Mosport Park. He returned in a Van Diemen the following year again claiming third place in the series.

After a partial schedule in 1994, Bianchi first race in CND Formula Ford 2000 in 1995. Bianchi won all three races he entered. Bianchi also entered his first USF2000 races. At New Hampshire International Speedway he claimed a third place. One year later, he won the race supporting the New Hampshire Indy 225. In 1996, Bianchi scored an impressive sixth place in the high ranking championship.

Summary:

1995 – 1997 SCCA/USAC F2000 National USA Championship KeyMotorsport; Van Diemen RF94. 2 pole positions, 5 top 10 finish, 2 top 3 finish, 1 win, 6th overall out of 75 entries.

1990 – 1995 Esso Protec/BFGoodich F1600 National Canadian Championship KeyMotorsport & BIMOR; Van Diemen & Swift . 10 pole positions, 20 top 5 finish, 8 top 3 finish, 3rd overall out of 83 entries. Named Rookie-of –the-Year; Year-end Speed Award.

1989 Spénard David F2000 Racing School Championship 1 win, 6th overall out of 35 entries, Named Rookie-of –the-Year.

1985 – 1988 Quebec & Canadian 2-stroke 100cc karting Championships 4th overall out of 25 entries in the Quebec Championship, 3rd overall out of 30 entries in the Canadian Championship.

== Complete motorsports results ==
=== American Open-Wheel racing results ===
(key) (Races in bold indicate pole position, races in italics indicate fastest race lap)

==== USF2000 National Championship ====
Year	Entrant	1	2	3	4	5	6	7	8	9	10	11	12	Pos	Points
1995	Key Motorsport	PIR1	PIR2	IRP; 25	RIR; 17	WGI; 42	MOH1; 10	NHS; 3	ATL1; 19	ATL2; 21	MOH1			???	???
1996	Key Motorsport	**WDW**; 4	**STP**; 14	PIR; 7	DSC1; 6	MOS; 4	IRP; 2	RIR; 24	WGI1; 35	WGI2; 31	MOH; 7	NHS; 1	LVS	**6th**	**149**

== Personal life ==
In 1998, Bianchi achieved a bachelor's degree from the Université du Québec in mechanical engineering. He then-on joined the Ordre des ingénieurs du Québec. In 2001, he achieved a master's degree in the same field of study from the Université de Sherbrooke. Following his graduation, Bianchi joined Bombardier Aerospace.
