= 1995 U.S. F2000 National Championship =

Car racing competition

1990-1994 United States Formula Ford 2000 National Championship season

Seasons
- ← -5 -3 →

The 1995 United States Formula Ford 2000 National Championship was the first USF2000 national championship sanctioned by the Tony George and U.S.A.C. The championship was formed after the purchase of the United States Auto Club F2000 series from P&P Promotions co-founder Doug Powell and Race Director, Jim Sanchez.

== Race calendar and results ==
Round	Circuit	Location	Date	Pole position	Fastest lap	Winner
1	Phoenix International Raceway	(United States) Avondale, Arizona	May 5	(Canada) Christian Vandal		(United States) Lance Norick
2	Phoenix International Raceway	(United States) Avondale, Arizona	May 6	(Canada) Christian Vandal		(United States) Memo Gidley
3	Indianapolis Raceway Park	(United States) Brownsburg, Indiana	May 28	(United States) Memo Gidley		(United States) Memo Gidley
4	Richmond International Raceway	(United States) Richmond, Virginia	June 17	(United States) Scott Bradley		(United States) Jimmy Chianis
5	Watkins Glen International	(United States) Watkins Glen, New York	June 25	(United States) Scott Bradley		(United States) Jeret Schroeder
6	Mid-Ohio Sports Car Course	(United States) Lexington, Ohio	August 12	(United States)		(United States) Memo Gidley
7	New Hampshire Motor Speedway	(United States) Loudon, New Hampshire	August 19	(United States) Jeret Schroeder		(United States) Jeret Schroeder
8	Road Atlanta	(United States) Braselton, Georgia	August 26	(United States) Chris Fahan		(United States) Jeret Schroeder
9	Road Atlanta	(United States) Braselton, Georgia	August 27	(United States) Memo Gidley		(Canada) Christian Vandal
10	Mid-Ohio Sports Car Course	(United States) Lexington, Ohio	October 8	(United States) Memo Gidley		(United States) Jeret Schroeder

== Drivers' Championship ==
Color	Result
Gold	Winner
Silver	2nd place
Bronze	3rd place
Green	4th & 5th place
Light Blue	6th–10th place
Dark Blue	11th place or lower
Purple	Did not finish
Red	Did not qualify (DNQ)
Brown	Withdrawn (Wth)
Black	Disqualified (DSQ)
White	Did not start (DNS)
Blank	Did not participate (DNP)
Blank	Driver replacement (Rpl)
Blank	Injured (Inj)
Blank	No race held (NH)

Pos	Driver	PIR		500	RIR	WGL	MOH	NHS	ATL		MOH	Points
1	(United States) Jeret Schroeder	5	43	4		1	4	1	1	3	1	203
2	(United States) Memo Gidley	46	1	1	4	43	1	2	6	2	7	196
3	(United States) Jimmy Chianis	2	2	19	1	6	60	4	3	7	30	160
4	(Canada) Christian Vandal	45	46	5	15	4	7	9	2	1	3	151
5	(United States) David Pook	3	39	7	2	3	3	12	13	11	19	138
6	(United States) Aaron Hsu	6	3	9	31	22	33	14	5	4	6	114
7	(United States) Duncan Dayton	7	6	3	7	14	8	7	12	DNS		110
8	(United States) John Fillipakis	36	10	2	3	16	5					84
9	(United States) Tim Duit	50	4	13	5	9	54	11	27	12	29	80
10	(United States) Joaquim DeSoto	38	8	14	26	5	52	8	9	DNS	9	78
	(United States) Mark Abel					18						
	(United States) Bryce Ambraziunas	44	13	18	14	46	16	27	21	20	21	
	(United States) Mike Andersen					20	2					
	(United States) Jeff Beck	40	17	DNQ	19		19				10	
	(United States) Frank Bernstein	37	31			11	32	34				
	(Canada) Bruno Bianchi			25	17	42	10	3	19	21		
	(United States) Steve Blaschak					21	57					
	(United States) Scott Bradley	15	41	DNQ	16	45	17	19			8	
	(United States) David Burkett	18	23									
	(United States) Shane Carrico	31	22	16					16	14		
	(United States) John Church	17	18				12				28	
	(United States) Larry Connor	39	12	8	8	44	11	13	25	23		
	(United States) Alan Cutler	43	27									
	(United States) Mike Dillard	11	11	20	13	27	26	22				
	(United States) Steve Djelebian				27	31	28					
	(United States) Ken Dromm	25	44	DNQ	18	32	39					
	(United States) Richard Eanes	10	50	6	24	10	51		15	9	40	
	(United States) Chris Fahan					2	21		8	DNS		
	(United States) Michael Fitzgerald	48	40	10	10	7	6				25	
	(United States) George Frazier	20	14			37						
	(United States) Marcelo Gaffoglio	51	16	11			58		24	15		
	(Canada) Jean-Francois Gaulin	24	42			19	30		11	18		
	(United States) Jon Groom	28	35	17	23	26	36	23	14	17		
	(United States) David Hall					38						
	(United States) Rick Hayward					12	14				11	
	(United States) Trevor Hilliar					36	31	33				
	(United States) Rusty Husband	16	26									
	(United States) Kent Jones					40		35				
	(United States) Steve Keister				11	23	30					
	(United States) Jaret Lozano	4	7	27								
	(United States) Dennis Macchio					24						
	(United States) Jeff McCusker			DNQ	20	15	48	16	32	16	18	
	(United States) Tim Minor				29		25				20	
	(Brazil) Zak Morioka			15	9	41	53	28	4	26	15	
	(Canada) Jacek Mucha		23			21			24	25		
	(United States) Lance Norick	1	20	26	12	25	44	18	23	22	14	
	(United States) Greg Pootmans	42	15									
	(United States) Scott Rubenzer										12	
	(United States) Ric Rushton	22	30	12	6	30	24	6	22	8	26	
	(United States) Thane Sellers	12	51			13	9					
	(United States) Anders Sterner					8						
	(United States) David Stromeyer					29	38	31				
	(United States) Gary Swanander	35	33		32							
	(Romania) Otmar Szafnauer			DNQ								
	(United States) Richard Taylor			DNQ		35		25				
	(United States) David Webb	13	9		22	39						
	(United States) Gary Weyhrich	8	36	24			22	26				
	(United States) Bill Wiedner			DNQ			18					
	(United States) Bob Wright					17						
	(United States) Brad Wright					34	40					
