= Scott Bradley (racing driver) =

American racing driver (born 1976)

- Nationality: (United States) American
- Born: October 14, 1976 (age 50) Mountain View, California, U.S.
- Retired: 2005

SPEED World Challenge
- Years active: 2002-2005
- Teams: Mazdaspeed; Circuit City
- Starts: 29
- Wins: 0
- Poles: 0
- Fastest laps: 0
- Best finish: 20th in 2005

Previous series
- 2003-2004 2000-2001 1999 1998 1995-1996 1994 1993 1990-1992: American Le Mans Series; Star Mazda; Skip Barber Formula Dodge; Formula Continental; USF2000; Formula Continental; Skip Barber Formula Ford; Karting

Championship titles
- 2001: Star Mazda

Scott Bradley (born October 14, 1976, in Mountain View, California) is an American former racing driver. Bradley won the 2001 Star Mazda championship. Bradley also competed in USF2000, American Le Mans Series among other series.

== Racing career ==
Scott Bradley began racing go-karts with the IKF in 1990 at the age of fourteen. In 1993, Bradley made his single seater debut. After completing the Skip Barber Racing School, he raced in the Skip Barber Racing School Formula Ford before moving into Formula Continental. For 1995, Bradley stepped up to the professional USF2000. He scored a pole position at Watkins Glen International but failed to finish the race. His best race result was an eighth place at Mid-Ohio Sports Car Course. The following year, Bradley moved to DSTP Motorsports, where he improved his best result to seventh, at Richmond International Raceway. In October 1996 Bradley tested a Formula Renault car for Redgrave Racing. Despite impressing several teams, he failed to put together a budget for the 1997 season leaving him without a drive.

In 1998, Bradley returned to the racing track running selected SCCA Formula Continental races. In 1999, Bradley ran a partial Formula Dodge Western Race Series schedule. Bradley finished on the podium twice, at Willow Springs Raceway and Las Vegas Motor Speedway. Bradley ran full-time in the Star Mazda series in 2000. Racing with World Speed Motorsports, he scored his first podium at Sonoma Raceway. He finished fourth in his inaugural championship. He returned to the series in 2001. Bradley won races at Texas Motor Speedway and Mazda Raceway Laguna Seca. He secured the championship over Marc De Vellis with a two-point advantage.

Bradley continued with Mazda the following years in the SPEED World Challenge Touring Car division. Racing a Mazda Protege, he scored one pole position in 2002. In 2005, he raced a Mazda 6 in the class without major results. In the American Le Mans Series Bradley joined Essex Racing. With teammate Jason Workman the team scored two podium finished, at the 2003 Grand Prix Americas and 2003 Monterey Sports Car Championships.

Failing to secure a full-time race seat, Bradley ended his professional racing career. In 2005, he joined the Star Race Cars as Sales and Marketing Manager.

== Complete motorsports results ==
=== American Open-Wheel racing results ===
(key) (Races in bold indicate pole position, races in italics indicate fastest race lap)

==== USF2000 National Championship results ====
Year	Entrant	1	2	3	4	5	6	7	8	9	10	11	12	Pos	Points
1995		PIR1; 15	PIR2; 41	IRP; DNQ	RIR; 16	**WGI**; 45	MOH1; 17	NHS; 19	ATL1; DNS	ATL2; DNS	MOH1; 8			???	???
1996	DSTP Motorsport	WDW; 11	STP; 21	PIR; 13	DSC1; 35	MOS; 13	IRP; 19	RIR; 7	WGI1	WGI2	MOH	NHS	LVS	???	???

==== Star Mazda Championship ====
Year	Team	1	2	3	4	5	6	7	8	9	Rank	Points
1999		SEB	ATL	PPI	SON	POR	TOP	LV; 26			**N.C.**	**N.C.**
2000	World Speed Motorsports	AMS; 5	SON; 2	MOS; 4	TEX; 5	POR; 6	ATL; 5	LAG; 6	LV; 5		**4th**	**262**
2001	World Speed Motorsports	TEX; 1	SEB; 2	SON; 4	**POR**; 8	MOS; 3	**LS1**; 1	ATL; 6	LS2; 10		**1st**	**289**
2002	Lightspeed	SEB	SON	PPI	MOH	ROA	WAS	MOS; 6	LS2	ATL	**N.C.**	**N.C.**
