= Jeff Zwart =

American film director

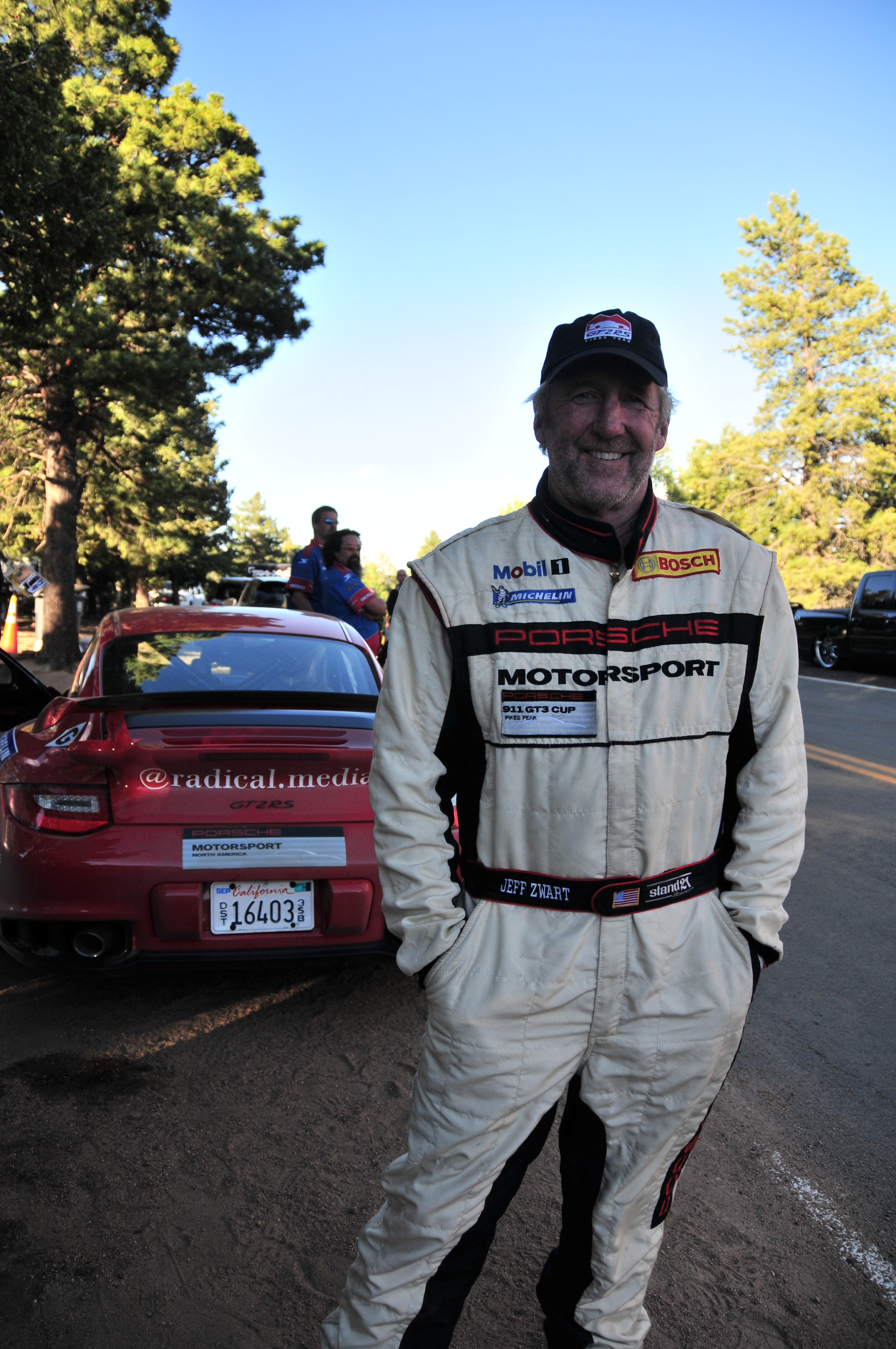
Jeff Zwart in 2011

Jeffrey Robert Zwart (born 24 May 1955) is an American commercial film director, racer, photographer, with clients that include Porsche, BMW, Cadillac, General Motors, Hyundai, Ford and more.

== Life and career ==
Zwart was born in Long Beach, California, and learned to drive in his father’s 1964 Porsche 901, chassis number 35. Growing up next door to his childhood friend and future automotive designer, Freeman Thomas, the two shared a lifelong obsession with automobiles and Porsches in particular. In high school, Zwart worked as a veterinary assistant in order to save enough money to eventually purchase a yellow Porsche 914/6. In 1997, he ran that same 914/6 in the 10,000 mile, 25 day, Panama to Alaska Rally winning second place overall. In 1979, after graduating from the Art Center College of Design in Pasadena, California, he began work as a still photographer shooting Road & Track Magazine covers, calendars, and article photos.

In 1989, following an American Photography Magazine cover story on Zwart’s automotive photography work, he was given the opportunity to direct television commercials. He joined Jon Kamen and Frank Scherma to form RadicalMedia.

Zwart has published three books in collaboration with David Bull Publishing and is a monthly contributor to the Porsche Club of America’s Panorama magazine.

== Racing career ==
Zwart's Porsche 906 on display at Petersen Museum.

Zwart started road racing Formula Fords during the mid-1980s on the West Coast of the United States which led to an interest in rallying. In 1989 and 1990 he drove a Mazda in the US Pro Rally Championship, eventually winning the Open Class National Championship. Zwart also competed in the New Zealand round of the World Rally Championship driving a Mitsubishi EVO in 1993.

Zwart became 2nd place in the 1997 Panama-Alaska race, driving his 1970 Porsche 914/6.

Zwart is noted for his wins at the Pikes Peak International Hill Climb in Colorado. In 1994, he entered the event with a Porsche and won the Open Class Championship. This success led to a number of programs; driving 10 different Porsches resulting in 8 different class championships over a period of 14 years, including his 2015 win in the Time Attack Class. In 2011, he competed in what was essentially a production street car, a Porsche 997 GT2 RS. The accomplishment of driving the Porsche from Southern California to the famous hill climb in Colorado and successfully racing at Pikes Peak was highlighted in the short film “Porsche, the Road to Pikes Peak,” directed by Will Roegge.

== Awards and honors ==
- Pikes Peak Hill Climb Museum Hall of Fame (2018)

== Books ==
- Porsche 917x17: The Cars and Drivers in Studio, ISBN 978-1-935007-04-3, Hardcover with slipcase, 13"x11", 264 pages, Published in 2009
- Three Points of Contact, ISBN 978-1-893618-99-2, Hardcover with slipcase, 13"x11", 152 pages, Published in 2008
- Porsche Rennsport, 1-893618-69-2, Hardcover with slipcase, 15"x10", 192 pages, published 2006
