= 1996 BPR 4 Hours of Spa =

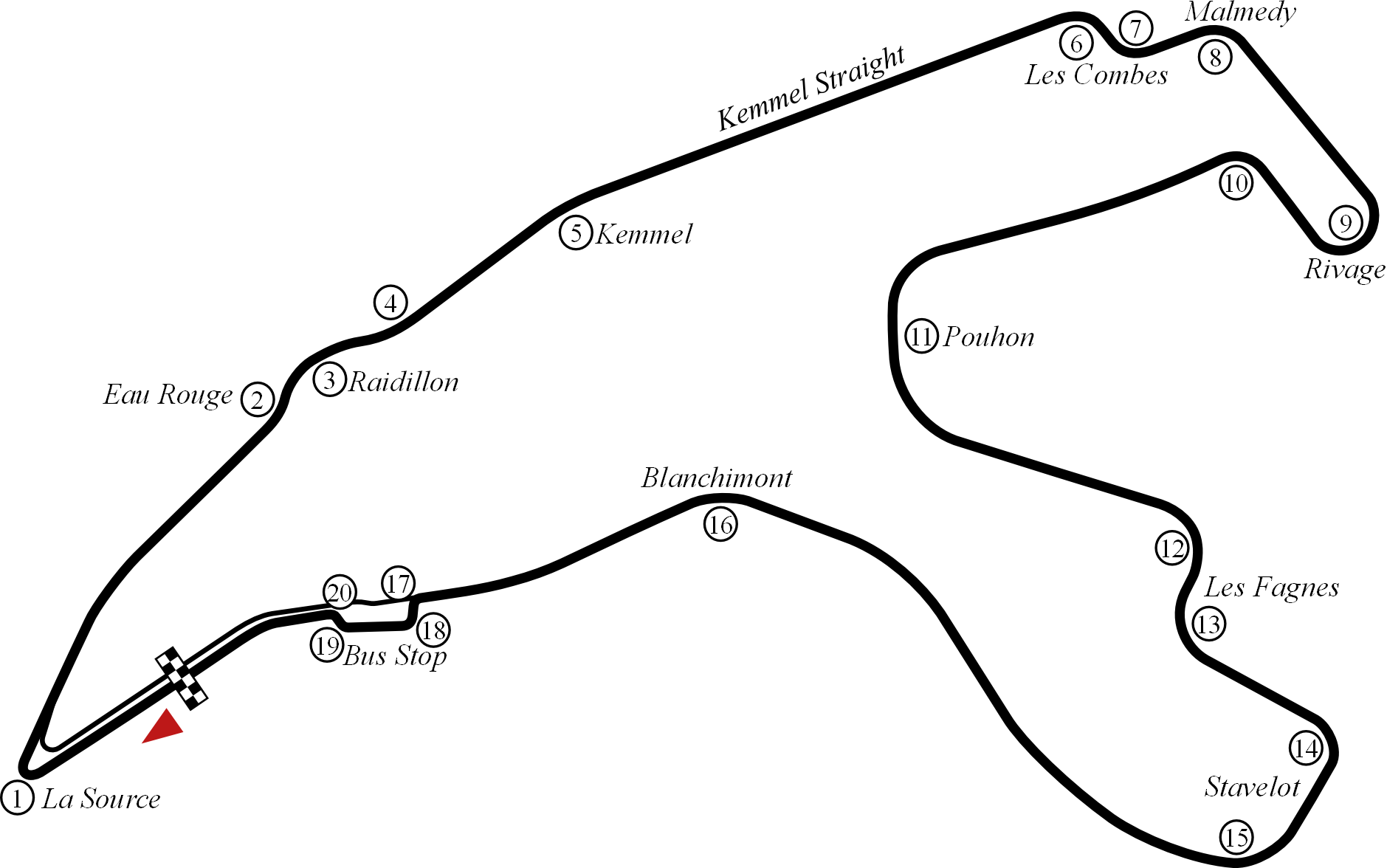
Layout of the Circuit de Spa-Francorchamps (1995–2003)

The 1996 BPR 4 Hours of Spa was the ninth round of the 1996 BPR Global GT Series season. It was run at the Circuit de Spa-Francorchamps on 22 September 1996.

== Official results ==
Class winners in bold. Cars failing to complete 75% of winner's distance marked as Not Classified (NC).

Pos	Class	No	Team	Drivers	Chassis	Tyre	Laps
Pos	Class	No	Team	Drivers	Engine	Tyre	Laps
1	**GT1**	**35**	**(Germany) Porsche AG**	**(Belgium) Thierry Boutsen (Germany) Hans-Joachim Stuck**	**Porsche 911 GT1**	**MI**	**100**
1	**GT1**	**35**	**(Germany) Porsche AG**	**(Belgium) Thierry Boutsen (Germany) Hans-Joachim Stuck**	**Porsche 3.2L Turbo Flat-6**	**MI**	**100**
2	GT1	2	(United Kingdom) Gulf Racing (United Kingdom) GTC Competition	(United Kingdom) James Weaver (United Kingdom) Ray Bellm	McLaren F1 GTR	**MI**	99
2	GT1	2	(United Kingdom) Gulf Racing (United Kingdom) GTC Competition	(United Kingdom) James Weaver (United Kingdom) Ray Bellm	BMW S70 6.1L V12	**MI**	99
3	GT1	1	(United Kingdom) West Competition (United Kingdom) David Price Racing	(Denmark) John Nielsen (Germany) Thomas Bscher	McLaren F1 GTR	**MI**	98
3	GT1	1	(United Kingdom) West Competition (United Kingdom) David Price Racing	(Denmark) John Nielsen (Germany) Thomas Bscher	BMW S70 6.1L V12	**MI**	98
4	GT1	27	(Italy) Ennea Igol	(Sweden) Anders Olofsson (Italy) Luciano della Noce (Italy) Max Angelelli	Ferrari F40 GTE	**P**	98
4	GT1	27	(Italy) Ennea Igol	(Sweden) Anders Olofsson (Italy) Luciano della Noce (Italy) Max Angelelli	Ferrari F120B 3.5L Turbo V8	**P**	98
5	GT1	22	(Netherlands) Lotus Racing Team	(Netherlands) Jan Lammers (United Kingdom) Andy Wallace	Lotus Esprit V8	**MI**	98
5	GT1	22	(Netherlands) Lotus Racing Team	(Netherlands) Jan Lammers (United Kingdom) Andy Wallace	Lotus Type-918 3.5L Turbo V8	**MI**	98
6	GT1	28	(Italy) Ennea Igol	(France) Jean-Marc Gounon (France) Éric Bernard (France) Paul Belmondo	Ferrari F40 GTE	**P**	96
6	GT1	28	(Italy) Ennea Igol	(France) Jean-Marc Gounon (France) Éric Bernard (France) Paul Belmondo	Ferrari F120B 3.5L Turbo V8	**P**	96
7	**GT2**	**27**	**(Germany) Roock Racing**	**(Germany) Ralf Kelleners (Switzerland) Bruno Eichmann (Germany) Gerd Ruch**	**Porsche 911 GT2**	**MI**	**96**
7	**GT2**	**27**	**(Germany) Roock Racing**	**(Germany) Ralf Kelleners (Switzerland) Bruno Eichmann (Germany) Gerd Ruch**	**Porsche 3.6L Turbo Flat-6**	**MI**	**96**
8	GT2	83	(Netherlands) Marcos Racing International	(Netherlands) Cor Euser (France) Ferdinand de Lesseps (Brazil) Thomas Erdos	Marcos LM600	**D**	95
8	GT2	83	(Netherlands) Marcos Racing International	(Netherlands) Cor Euser (France) Ferdinand de Lesseps (Brazil) Thomas Erdos	Chevrolet 6.0L V8	**D**	95
9	GT1	17	(France) Viper Team Oreca	(France) Philippe Gache (France) Éric Hélary	Chrysler Viper GTS-R	**MI**	93
9	GT1	17	(France) Viper Team Oreca	(France) Philippe Gache (France) Éric Hélary	Chrysler 8.0L V10	**MI**	93
10	GT2	65	(Germany) Roock Racing	(Italy) Stefano Buttiero (France) Guy Martinolle (France) Jean-Claude Lagniez	Porsche 911 GT2	**MI**	93
10	GT2	65	(Germany) Roock Racing	(Italy) Stefano Buttiero (France) Guy Martinolle (France) Jean-Claude Lagniez	Porsche 3.6L Turbo Flat-6	**MI**	93
11	GT2	107	(Austria) Konrad Motorsport	(Switzerland) Toni Seiler (Germany) Wido Rössler	Porsche 911 GT2	**MI**	93
11	GT2	107	(Austria) Konrad Motorsport	(Switzerland) Toni Seiler (Germany) Wido Rössler	Porsche 3.6L Turbo Flat-6	**MI**	93
12	GT2	99	(Switzerland) Elf Haberthur Racing	(Belgium) Frédéric Bouvy (Switzerland) Loris Kessel (Belgium) Michel Neugarten	Porsche 911 GT2	**P**	93
12	GT2	99	(Switzerland) Elf Haberthur Racing	(Belgium) Frédéric Bouvy (Switzerland) Loris Kessel (Belgium) Michel Neugarten	Porsche 3.6L Turbo Flat-6	**P**	93
13	GT2	55	(Switzerland) Stadler Motorsport	(Switzerland) Lilian Bryner (Switzerland) Enzo Calderari (Germany) Ulli Richter	Porsche 911 GT2	**P**	92
13	GT2	55	(Switzerland) Stadler Motorsport	(Switzerland) Lilian Bryner (Switzerland) Enzo Calderari (Germany) Ulli Richter	Porsche 3.6L Turbo Flat-6	**P**	92
14	GT2	90	(Italy) Angelo Zadra	(Italy) Angelo Zadra (Italy) Maurizio Monforte	Porsche 911 GT2	**G**	91
14	GT2	90	(Italy) Angelo Zadra	(Italy) Angelo Zadra (Italy) Maurizio Monforte	Porsche 3.6L Turbo Flat-6	**G**	91
15	GT2	77	(Germany) Seikel Motorsport	(Austria) Manfred Jurasz (Germany) Peter Seikel (Germany) Fred Rosterg	Porsche 911 GT2	**P**	91
15	GT2	77	(Germany) Seikel Motorsport	(Austria) Manfred Jurasz (Germany) Peter Seikel (Germany) Fred Rosterg	Porsche 3.6L Turbo Flat-6	**P**	91
16	GT2	84	(Italy) Promosport Italia	(Italy) Renato Mastropietro (Italy) Vincenzo Polli (Italy) Andrea Barenghi	Porsche 911 GT2	**P**	91
16	GT2	84	(Italy) Promosport Italia	(Italy) Renato Mastropietro (Italy) Vincenzo Polli (Italy) Andrea Barenghi	Porsche 3.6L Turbo Flat-6	**P**	91
17	GT1	16	(Austria) Karl Augustin	(Austria) Karl Augustin (Germany) Ernst Gschwender (Austria) Horst Felbermayr	Porsche 911 Carrera Cup	**P**	90
17	GT1	16	(Austria) Karl Augustin	(Austria) Karl Augustin (Germany) Ernst Gschwender (Austria) Horst Felbermayr	Porsche 3.6L Turbo Flat-6	**P**	90
18	GT2	93	(United Kingdom) Parr Motorsport (United Kingdom) New Hardware	(United Kingdom) Hugh Price (Germany) John Robinson (United Kingdom) Peter Owen	Porsche 911 GT2	**P**	90
18	GT2	93	(United Kingdom) Parr Motorsport (United Kingdom) New Hardware	(United Kingdom) Hugh Price (Germany) John Robinson (United Kingdom) Peter Owen	Porsche 3.6L Turbo Flat-6	**P**	90
19	GT2	52	(Germany) Krauß Rennsporttechnik	(Germany) Bernhard Müller (Germany) Michael Trunk	Porsche 911 GT2	**P**	89
19	GT2	52	(Germany) Krauß Rennsporttechnik	(Germany) Bernhard Müller (Germany) Michael Trunk	Porsche 3.6L Turbo Flat-6	**P**	89
20	GT1	32	(France) Viper Team Oreca	(Monaco) Olivier Beretta (France) Alain Ferté	Chrysler Viper GTS-R	**MI**	98
20	GT1	32	(France) Viper Team Oreca	(Monaco) Olivier Beretta (France) Alain Ferté	Chrysler 8.0L V10	**MI**	98
21	GT1	8	(France) BBA Compétition	(France) Jean-Luc Maury-Laribière (Netherlands) Hans Hugenholtz (Belgium) Jean-Paul Libert	McLaren F1 GTR	**D**	88
21	GT1	8	(France) BBA Compétition	(France) Jean-Luc Maury-Laribière (Netherlands) Hans Hugenholtz (Belgium) Jean-Paul Libert	BMW S70 6.1L V12	**D**	88
22	GT2	111	(United Kingdom) Chamberlain	(United Kingdom) Geoff Lister (United Kingdom) John Greasley (United Kingdom) Gerard MacQuillan	Porsche 911 GT2	?	87
22	GT2	111	(United Kingdom) Chamberlain	(United Kingdom) Geoff Lister (United Kingdom) John Greasley (United Kingdom) Gerard MacQuillan	Porsche 3.6L Turbo Flat-6	?	87
23	GT2	85	(Italy) Gian Luigi Locatelli	(Italy) Gian Luigi Locatelli (Italy) Leonardo Maddalena	Porsche 993 Carerra Cup	**P**	87
23	GT2	85	(Italy) Gian Luigi Locatelli	(Italy) Gian Luigi Locatelli (Italy) Leonardo Maddalena	Porsche 3.8L Flat-6	**P**	87
24	GT1	42	Porsche Club of Belgium	(Belgium) Eddy van der Pluym (Belgium) Leo van Sande	Porsche 911 GT2 Evo	**P**	87
24	GT1	42	Porsche Club of Belgium	(Belgium) Eddy van der Pluym (Belgium) Leo van Sande	Porsche 3.6L Turbo Flat-6	**P**	87
25	GT2	73	(United Kingdom) Charles Morgan	(United Kingdom) Charles Morgan (United Kingdom) William Wykeham (United Kingdom) Steve Lawrence	Morgan Plus 8 GTR	**D**	87
25	GT2	73	(United Kingdom) Charles Morgan	(United Kingdom) Charles Morgan (United Kingdom) William Wykeham (United Kingdom) Steve Lawrence	Rover 5.0L V8	**D**	87
26	GT1	31	(Germany) Hartmann Motorsport	(Germany) Helmut Pfeifer (Germany) Thomas Fritsch	Ferrari F40	?	84
26	GT1	31	(Germany) Hartmann Motorsport	(Germany) Helmut Pfeifer (Germany) Thomas Fritsch	Ferrari 3.0L Turbo V8	?	84
27 DNF	GT1	6	(United Kingdom) Gulf Racing (United Kingdom) GTC Competition	(France) Pierre-Henri Raphanel (United Kingdom) Lindsay Owen-Jones	McLaren F1 GTR	**MI**	86
27 DNF	GT1	6	(United Kingdom) Gulf Racing (United Kingdom) GTC Competition	(France) Pierre-Henri Raphanel (United Kingdom) Lindsay Owen-Jones	BMW S70 6.1L V12	**MI**	86
28 DNF	GT1	49	(Germany) Freisinger Motorsport	(Germany) Wolfgang Kaufmann (France) Olivier Grouillard	Porsche 911 GT2 Evo	**G**	85
28 DNF	GT1	49	(Germany) Freisinger Motorsport	(Germany) Wolfgang Kaufmann (France) Olivier Grouillard	Porsche 3.6L Turbo Flat-6	**G**	85
29 DNF	GT2	88	(Austria) Konrad Motorsport	(France) Bob Wollek (France) Stéphane Ortelli (Austria) Franz Konrad	Porsche 911 GT2	**MI**	69
29 DNF	GT2	88	(Austria) Konrad Motorsport	(France) Bob Wollek (France) Stéphane Ortelli (Austria) Franz Konrad	Renault PRV 3.0L Turbo V6	**MI**	69
30 DNF	GT2	95	(Belgium) European Luigi Racing	(Belgium) José Close (France) Philippe Smaniotto	Dodge Viper RT/10	**D**	34
30 DNF	GT2	95	(Belgium) European Luigi Racing	(Belgium) José Close (France) Philippe Smaniotto	Dodge 8.0L V10	**D**	34
31 DNF	GT2	69	(Germany) Proton Competition	(France) Patrick Vuillaume (Netherlands) Harm Lagaay (Germany) Gerold Ried	Porsche 911 GT2	**P**	31
31 DNF	GT2	69	(Germany) Proton Competition	(France) Patrick Vuillaume (Netherlands) Harm Lagaay (Germany) Gerold Ried	Porsche 3.6L Turbo Flat-6	**P**	31
32 DNF	GT2	50	(Switzerland) Stadler Motorsport	(Switzerland) Uwe Sick (Italy) Luigino Pagotto	Porsche 911 GT2	**P**	30
32 DNF	GT2	50	(Switzerland) Stadler Motorsport	(Switzerland) Uwe Sick (Italy) Luigino Pagotto	Porsche 3.6L Turbo Flat-6	**P**	30
33 DNF	GT1	21	(Netherlands) Lotus Racing Team	(Netherlands) Mike Hezemans (United Kingdom) Alex Portman	Lotus Esprit V8	**MI**	24
33 DNF	GT1	21	(Netherlands) Lotus Racing Team	(Netherlands) Mike Hezemans (United Kingdom) Alex Portman	Lotus 3.5L Turbo V8	**MI**	24
34 DNF	GT2	59	(France) Raymond Touroul	(France) Didier Ortion (France) Jean-Claude Barthe (France) Jean-Louis Ricci	Porsche 993 Carrera Cup	**MI**	20
34 DNF	GT2	59	(France) Raymond Touroul	(France) Didier Ortion (France) Jean-Claude Barthe (France) Jean-Louis Ricci	Porsche 3.8L Flat-6	**MI**	20
35 DNF	GT1	26	(United Kingdom) Lister Storm	(United Kingdom) Geoff Lees (United Kingdom) Tiff Needell	Lister Storm GTS	**MI**	19
35 DNF	GT1	26	(United Kingdom) Lister Storm	(United Kingdom) Geoff Lees (United Kingdom) Tiff Needell	Jaguar 7.0L V12	**MI**	19
36 DNF	GT2	78	(Germany) Procar Racing Service GmbH	(Austria) Helmut König (Germany) Harald Becker	Porsche 911 GT2	?	10
36 DNF	GT2	78	(Germany) Procar Racing Service GmbH	(Austria) Helmut König (Germany) Harald Becker	Porsche 3.6L Turbo Flat-6	?	10
DNS	GT2	106	(Germany) Roock Racing	(France) Jean-Pierre Jabouille (France) François Lafon (France) Jean-Marc Smadja	Porsche 911 GT2	**MI**	-
DNS	GT2	106	(Germany) Roock Racing	(France) Jean-Pierre Jabouille (France) François Lafon (France) Jean-Marc Smadja	Porsche 3.6L Turbo Flat-6	**MI**	-
DSQ	GT2	64	(United Kingdom) Lanzante Motorsport	(United Kingdom) Soames Langton (United States) Paul Burdell	Porsche 911 GT2	**MI**	94
DSQ	GT2	64	(United Kingdom) Lanzante Motorsport	(United Kingdom) Soames Langton (United States) Paul Burdell	Porsche 3.6L Turbo Flat-6	**MI**	94

== Statistics ==
- Pole Position - (Belgium) Thierry Boutsen (#35 Porsche AG) - 2:13.857
- Fastest Lap - (Belgium) Thierry Boutsen (#35 Porsche AG) - 2:16.978

BPR Global GT Series
Previous race: Brands Hatch	1996 season	Next race: Nogaro
