= Chrissie Neil =

Scottish motor rally racing driver

Chrissie Neil (1927-1991) was a prominent motor rally racing driver from Glasgow, Scotland. Chrissie Neil followed her sister, Andy Neil into motor racing, acting as her as navigator once she had passed her driving test. The two sisters were able to procure a Morgan sports car after Peter Morgan (son of H.F.S. Morgan, the chairman of Morgan Motor Company) personally saw them racing. Together, they raced and competed in the RAC Rally 1953 driving the Morgan Plus 4. In 1954, they competed in the Monte Carlo Rally, driving a Standard Vanguard and they also competed here in 1955 and 1956. Chrissie entered the Monte Carlo Rally alone in 1958.
