= Andy Neil =

Andy Neil may refer to:

- Andy Neil (footballer)
- Andy Neil (racing driver)

== See also ==
- Andrew Neil, Scottish journalist and broadcaster
