= Andy Neil (racing driver) =

Andy Neil (1924–2004), also known as Annie or Innes, was a prominent motor rally racing driver from Glasgow, Scotland. She learned to drive from running her Dad’s pig farm and her sister, Chrissie Neil joined her as navigator after she had also passed her driving test. The two sisters were able to procure a Morgan sports car after Peter Morgan (son of H.F.S. Morgan, the chairman of Morgan Motor Company) personally saw them racing. Together, they raced and competed in the RAC Rally 1953 driving the Morgan Plus 4. In 1954, they competed in the Monte Carlo Rally, driving a Standard Vanguard and they also competed here in 1955 and 1956. After retiring from racing, Andy worked in sales. Chrissie entered the Monte Carlo Rally alone in 1958.

Neil married Francis D. Dundas, also a motor rally driver in 1956 in St. Margaret's Church, Tollcross, Glasgow.
