= 1996 BPR 4 Hours of Brands Hatch =

Motor racing event

Layout of the Brands Hatch (1988-1998)

The 1996 BPR 4 Hours of Brands Hatch was the eighth round of the 1996 BPR Global GT Series season.

== Results ==
Class winners in bold. Cars failing to complete 75% of winner's distance marked as Not Classified (NC).

Pos	Class	No	Team	Drivers	Chassis	Tyre	Laps
Pos	Class	No	Team	Drivers	Engine	Tyre	Laps
1	**GT1**	**35**	**(Germany) Porsche AG**	**(Germany) Hans-Joachim Stuck (Belgium) Thierry Boutsen**	**Porsche 911 GT1**	**MI**	**166**
1	**GT1**	**35**	**(Germany) Porsche AG**	**(Germany) Hans-Joachim Stuck (Belgium) Thierry Boutsen**	Porsche 3.2L Turbo Flat-6	**MI**	**166**
2	GT1	3	(United Kingdom) Harrods Mach One Racing (United Kingdom) David Price Racing	(United Kingdom) Andy Wallace (France) Olivier Grouillard	McLaren F1 GTR	**G**	165
2	GT1	3	(United Kingdom) Harrods Mach One Racing (United Kingdom) David Price Racing	(United Kingdom) Andy Wallace (France) Olivier Grouillard	BMW S70 6.1L V12	**G**	165
3	GT1	6	(United Kingdom) Gulf Racing (United Kingdom) GTC Competition	(France) Pierre-Henri Raphanel (United Kingdom) Lindsay Owen-Jones	McLaren F1 GTR	**MI**	164
3	GT1	6	(United Kingdom) Gulf Racing (United Kingdom) GTC Competition	(France) Pierre-Henri Raphanel (United Kingdom) Lindsay Owen-Jones	BMW S70 6.1L V12	**MI**	164
4	GT1	1	(United Kingdom) West Competition (United Kingdom) David Price Racing	(Denmark) John Nielsen (Germany) Thomas Bscher	McLaren F1 GTR	**G**	164
4	GT1	1	(United Kingdom) West Competition (United Kingdom) David Price Racing	(Denmark) John Nielsen (Germany) Thomas Bscher	BMW S70 6.1L V12	**G**	164
5	GT1	27	(Italy) Ennea/Igol	(Sweden) Anders Olofsson (Italy) Luciano della Noce	Ferrari F40 GTE	**P**	161
5	GT1	27	(Italy) Ennea/Igol	(Sweden) Anders Olofsson (Italy) Luciano della Noce	Ferrari F120B 3.5L Turbo V8	**P**	161
6	**GT2**	**88**	**(Germany) Konrad Motorsport**	**(Austria) Franz Konrad (France) Bob Wollek (France) Stéphane Ortelli**	**Porsche 911 GT2**	**MI**	**158**
6	**GT2**	**88**	**(Germany) Konrad Motorsport**	**(Austria) Franz Konrad (France) Bob Wollek (France) Stéphane Ortelli**	Porsche 3.6L Turbo Flat-6	**MI**	**158**
7	GT2	83	(Netherlands) Marcos Racing International	(Netherlands) Cor Euser (France) Ferdinand de Lesseps (Brazil) Thomas Erdos	Marcos LM600	**D**	158
7	GT2	83	(Netherlands) Marcos Racing International	(Netherlands) Cor Euser (France) Ferdinand de Lesseps (Brazil) Thomas Erdos	Chevrolet 6.0L V8	**D**	158
8	GT1	32	(France) Viper Team Oreca	(Monaco) Olivier Beretta (United Kingdom) Justin Bell	Chrysler Viper GTS-R	**MI**	156
8	GT1	32	(France) Viper Team Oreca	(Monaco) Olivier Beretta (United Kingdom) Justin Bell	Chrysler 356-T6 8.0L V10	**MI**	156
9	GT2	56	(Germany) Roock Racing	(Switzerland) Bruno Eichmann (Germany) Gerd Ruch (Germany) Ralf Kelleners	Porsche 911 GT2	**MI**	156
9	GT2	56	(Germany) Roock Racing	(Switzerland) Bruno Eichmann (Germany) Gerd Ruch (Germany) Ralf Kelleners	Porsche 3.6L Turbo Flat-6	**MI**	156
10	GT2	55	(Switzerland) Stadler Motorsport	(Switzerland) Lilian Bryner (Switzerland) Enzo Calderari	Porsche 911 GT2	**P**	153
10	GT2	55	(Switzerland) Stadler Motorsport	(Switzerland) Lilian Bryner (Switzerland) Enzo Calderari	Porsche 3.6L Turbo Flat-6	**P**	153
11	GT2	106	(Germany) Roock Racing	(France) François Lafon (France) Jean-Marc Smadja (France) Jean-Pierre Jarier	Porsche 911 GT2	**MI**	152
11	GT2	106	(Germany) Roock Racing	(France) François Lafon (France) Jean-Marc Smadja (France) Jean-Pierre Jarier	Porsche 3.6L Turbo Flat-6	**MI**	152
12	GT2	90	(Italy) Angelo Zadra	(Italy) Angelo Zadra (Italy) Maurizio Monforte (Italy) Luca Drudi	Porsche 911 GT2	**G**	151
12	GT2	90	(Italy) Angelo Zadra	(Italy) Angelo Zadra (Italy) Maurizio Monforte (Italy) Luca Drudi	Porsche 3.6L Turbo Flat-6	**G**	151
13	GT2	52	(Germany) Krauß Rennsporttechnik	(Germany) Bernhard Müller (Germany) Michael Trunk	Porsche 911 GT2	**P**	150
13	GT2	52	(Germany) Krauß Rennsporttechnik	(Germany) Bernhard Müller (Germany) Michael Trunk	Porsche 3.6L Turbo Flat-6	**P**	150
14	GT2	93	(United Kingdom) Parr Motorsport (United Kingdom) New Hardware	(United Kingdom) Hugh Price (United Kingdom) John Robinson (United Kingdom) Peter Owen	Porsche 911 GT2	**P**	148
14	GT2	93	(United Kingdom) Parr Motorsport (United Kingdom) New Hardware	(United Kingdom) Hugh Price (United Kingdom) John Robinson (United Kingdom) Peter Owen	Porsche 3.6L Turbo Flat-6	**P**	148
15	GT2	105	(Germany) Repsol Kremer	(Spain) Alfonso de Orleans (Spain) Joaquin Folch (France) Christophe Bouchut	Porsche 911 GT2	**G**	145
15	GT2	105	(Germany) Repsol Kremer	(Spain) Alfonso de Orleans (Spain) Joaquin Folch (France) Christophe Bouchut	Porsche 3.6L Turbo Flat-6	**G**	145
16	GT2	77	(Germany) Seikel Motorsport	(Czech Republic) Karel Dolejší (Germany) Peter Seikel (United Kingdom) Peter Chambers	Porsche 911 GT2	**P**	144
16	GT2	77	(Germany) Seikel Motorsport	(Czech Republic) Karel Dolejší (Germany) Peter Seikel (United Kingdom) Peter Chambers	Porsche 3.6L Turbo Flat-6	**P**	144
17	GT2	100	(France) Jérôme Brarda	(France) Jérôme Brarda (Netherlands) Erik Henriksen (France) Gérard Paillet	Porsche 911 Carrera RS	**P**	132
17	GT2	100	(France) Jérôme Brarda	(France) Jérôme Brarda (Netherlands) Erik Henriksen (France) Gérard Paillet	Porsche 3.6L Flat-6	**P**	132
18	GT2	73	(United Kingdom) Charles Morgan	(United Kingdom) William Wykeham (United Kingdom) Joel Wykeham (United Kingdom) Steve Lawrence	Morgan Plus 8 GTR	**D**	132
18	GT2	73	(United Kingdom) Charles Morgan	(United Kingdom) William Wykeham (United Kingdom) Joel Wykeham (United Kingdom) Steve Lawrence	Rover 5.0L V8	**D**	132
19	GT2	69	(Germany) Proton Competition	(France) Patrick Vuillaume (Germany) Gerold Ried	Porsche 911 GT2	**P**	125
19	GT2	69	(Germany) Proton Competition	(France) Patrick Vuillaume (Germany) Gerold Ried	Porsche 3.6L Turbo Flat-6	**P**	125
20 DNF	GT2	107	(Germany) Konrad Motorsport	(Switzerland) Toni Seiler (United Kingdom) Robert Nearn (Netherlands) Bert Ploeg	Porsche 911 GT2	**MI**	142
20 DNF	GT2	107	(Germany) Konrad Motorsport	(Switzerland) Toni Seiler (United Kingdom) Robert Nearn (Netherlands) Bert Ploeg	Porsche 3.6L Turbo Flat-6	**MI**	142
21 DNF	GT1	2	(United Kingdom) Gulf Racing (United Kingdom) GTC Motorsport	(United Kingdom) James Weaver (United Kingdom) Ray Bellm	McLaren F1 GTR	**MI**	141
21 DNF	GT1	2	(United Kingdom) Gulf Racing (United Kingdom) GTC Motorsport	(United Kingdom) James Weaver (United Kingdom) Ray Bellm	BMW S70 6.1L V12	**MI**	141
22 DNF	GT2	65	(Germany) Roock Racing	(France) Guy Martinolle (France) Jean-Claude Lagniez (United Kingdom) Andy Pilgrim	Porsche 911 GT2	**MI**	136
22 DNF	GT2	65	(Germany) Roock Racing	(France) Guy Martinolle (France) Jean-Claude Lagniez (United Kingdom) Andy Pilgrim	Porsche 3.6L Turbo Flat-6	**MI**	136
23 DNF	GT2	75	(United Kingdom) Agusta Racing Team	(Italy) Rocky Agusta (Italy) Almo Coppelli	Callaway Corvette GT-LM	**D**	127
23 DNF	GT2	75	(United Kingdom) Agusta Racing Team	(Italy) Rocky Agusta (Italy) Almo Coppelli	Chevrolet LT1 6.2L V8	**D**	127
24 DNF	GT2	101	(United Kingdom) John Greasley	(United Kingdom) John Greasley (United Kingdom) John Morrison	Porsche 911 GT2	?	113
24 DNF	GT2	101	(United Kingdom) John Greasley	(United Kingdom) John Greasley (United Kingdom) John Morrison	Porsche 3.6L Turbo Flat-6	?	113
25 DNF	GT2	89	(United Kingdom) Team Marcos	(United Kingdom) Robert Schirle (United Kingdom) Andy Purvis (United Kingdom) David Warnock	Marcos LM600	**D**	112
25 DNF	GT2	89	(United Kingdom) Team Marcos	(United Kingdom) Robert Schirle (United Kingdom) Andy Purvis (United Kingdom) David Warnock	Chevrolet 6.0L V8	**D**	112
26 DNF	GT1	14	(Germany) Repsol Kremer	(France) Christophe Bouchut (Spain) Thomas Saldaña	Porsche 911 GT2 Evo	**G**	88
26 DNF	GT1	14	(Germany) Repsol Kremer	(France) Christophe Bouchut (Spain) Thomas Saldaña	Porsche M64/83 3.6L Turbo Flat-6	**G**	88
27 DNF	GT1	16	(Austria) Karl Augustin	(Austria) Karl Augustin (Austria) Stefan Roitmayer (Austria) Johannes Huber	Porsche 911 Carrera Cup	**G**	85
27 DNF	GT1	16	(Austria) Karl Augustin	(Austria) Karl Augustin (Austria) Stefan Roitmayer (Austria) Johannes Huber	Porsche 3.6L Flat-6	**G**	85
28 DNF	GT1	26	(United Kingdom) Lister Storm	(United Kingdom) Geoff Lees (United Kingdom) Tiff Needell	Lister Storm GTS	**MI**	84
28 DNF	GT1	26	(United Kingdom) Lister Storm	(United Kingdom) Geoff Lees (United Kingdom) Tiff Needell	Jaguar 7.0L V12	**MI**	84
29 DNF	GT2	96	(France) Larbre Compétition	(France) Patrice Goueslard (Germany) André Ahrlé	Porsche 911 GT2	**P**	78
29 DNF	GT2	96	(France) Larbre Compétition	(France) Patrice Goueslard (Germany) André Ahrlé	Porsche 3.6L Turbo Flat-6	**P**	78
30 DNF	GT1	23	(United Kingdom) Geoff Lister	(United Kingdom) Geoff Lister (United Kingdom) Win Percy (United Kingdom) John Williams	Jaguar XJ220	**A**	76
30 DNF	GT1	23	(United Kingdom) Geoff Lister	(United Kingdom) Geoff Lister (United Kingdom) Win Percy (United Kingdom) John Williams	Jaguar JV6 3.5L Turbo V6	**A**	76
31 DNF	GT1	21	(United Kingdom) Lotus Racing Team	(United Kingdom) Alex Portman (Netherlands) Mike Hezemans	Lotus Esprit V8	**MI**	71
31 DNF	GT1	21	(United Kingdom) Lotus Racing Team	(United Kingdom) Alex Portman (Netherlands) Mike Hezemans	Lotus 918 3.5L Turbo V8	**MI**	71
32 DNF	GT2	60	(Germany) Oberbayern Motorsport	(Germany) Jürgen von Gartzen (Germany) Detlef Hübner (Netherlands) Patrick Huisman	Porsche 911 GT2	**P**	71
32 DNF	GT2	60	(Germany) Oberbayern Motorsport	(Germany) Jürgen von Gartzen (Germany) Detlef Hübner (Netherlands) Patrick Huisman	Porsche 3.6L Turbo Flat-6	**P**	71
33 DNF	GT2	95	(Belgium) European Luigi Racing	(Belgium) José Close (Germany) Wolfgang Haugg (France) Philippe Smaniotto	Dodge Viper RT/10	**D**	68
33 DNF	GT2	95	(Belgium) European Luigi Racing	(Belgium) José Close (Germany) Wolfgang Haugg (France) Philippe Smaniotto	Dodge 8.0L V10	**D**	68
34 DNF	GT2	85	(Italy) Gian Luigi Locatelli	(Italy) Gian Luigi Locatelli (Italy) Leonardo Maddalena	Porsche 993 Carrera Cup	**P**	45
34 DNF	GT2	85	(Italy) Gian Luigi Locatelli	(Italy) Gian Luigi Locatelli (Italy) Leonardo Maddalena	Porsche 3.6L Flat-6	**P**	45
35 DNF	GT2	50	(Switzerland) Stadler Motorsport	(Switzerland) Uwe Sick (Italy) Renato Mastropietro	Porsche 911 GT2	**P**	39
35 DNF	GT2	50	(Switzerland) Stadler Motorsport	(Switzerland) Uwe Sick (Italy) Renato Mastropietro	Porsche 3.6L Turbo Flat-6	**P**	39
36 DNF	GT2	78	(Germany) Seikel Motorsport	(Austria) Helmut König (Austria) Harald Becker	Porsche 911 GT2	**P**	34
36 DNF	GT2	78	(Germany) Seikel Motorsport	(Austria) Helmut König (Austria) Harald Becker	Porsche 3.6L Turbo Flat-6	**P**	34
37 DNF	GT2	94	(United Kingdom) TVR	(United Kingdom) Mark Hales (United Kingdom) Phil Andrews	TVR Cerbera	**D**	27
37 DNF	GT2	94	(United Kingdom) TVR	(United Kingdom) Mark Hales (United Kingdom) Phil Andrews	TVR Speed Six 4.5L I6	**D**	27
38 DNF	GT1	22	(United Kingdom) Lotus Racing Team	(Netherlands) Jan Lammers (United Kingdom) Chris Goodwin	Lotus Esprit V8	**MI**	25
38 DNF	GT1	22	(United Kingdom) Lotus Racing Team	(Netherlands) Jan Lammers (United Kingdom) Chris Goodwin	Lotus 3.5L Turbo V8	**MI**	25
39 DNF	GT1	17	(France) Viper Team Oreca	(France) Éric Hélary (France) Philippe Gache	Chrysler Viper GTS-R	**MI**	24
39 DNF	GT1	17	(France) Viper Team Oreca	(France) Éric Hélary (France) Philippe Gache	Dodge 356-T6 8.0L V10	**MI**	24
40 DNF	GT2	92	(United Kingdom) Parr Motorsport (United Kingdom) New Hardware	(Italy) Stefano Buttiero (France) Michel Ligonnet (United Kingdom) David Saunders	Porsche 911 GT2	**P**	19
40 DNF	GT2	92	(United Kingdom) Parr Motorsport (United Kingdom) New Hardware	(Italy) Stefano Buttiero (France) Michel Ligonnet (United Kingdom) David Saunders	Porsche 3.6L Turbo Flat-6	**P**	19
41 DNF	GT2	66	(United Kingdom) Steve O'Rourke	(United Kingdom) Steve O'Rourke (United Kingdom) Guy Holmes	Porsche 911 GT2	**D**	2
41 DNF	GT2	66	(United Kingdom) Steve O'Rourke	(United Kingdom) Steve O'Rourke (United Kingdom) Guy Holmes	Porsche 3.6L Turbo Flat-6	**D**	2
42 DNF	GT2	87	(Germany) RWS Brun Motorsport	(Italy) Raffaele Sangiuolo (Germany) Gottfried Rampl (United Kingdom) Jonathan Baker	Porsche 911 GT2	**P**	2
42 DNF	GT2	87	(Germany) RWS Brun Motorsport	(Italy) Raffaele Sangiuolo (Germany) Gottfried Rampl (United Kingdom) Jonathan Baker	Porsche 3.6L Turbo Flat-6	**P**	2
DNS	GT2	64	(United Kingdom) Lanzante Motorsport	(United States) Paul Burdell (United Kingdom) Soames Langton	Porsche 911 GT2	**MI**	-
DNS	GT2	64	(United Kingdom) Lanzante Motorsport	(United States) Paul Burdell (United Kingdom) Soames Langton	Porsche 3.6L Turbo Flat-6	**MI**	-
DNS	GT2	53	(Switzerland) Yellow Racing	(France) Christian Heinkélé (France) François O'Born (Switzerland) Henri-Louis Maunoir	Ferrari F355	**MI**	-
DNS	GT2	53	(Switzerland) Yellow Racing	(France) Christian Heinkélé (France) François O'Born (Switzerland) Henri-Louis Maunoir	Ferrari F129B 3.5L V8	**MI**	-

== Statistics ==
- Pole Position - (Belgium) Thierry Boutsen (#35 Porsche AG) - 1:51.512
- Fastest Lap - (Germany) Hans-Joachim Stuck (#35 Porsche AG) - 1:52.653
