= Charles Morgan (automaker) =

English businessman (born 1951)

- Born: 29 July 1951
- Occupation: Businessman
- Known for: Morgan Motor Company (managing director)

Charles Peter Henry Morgan (born 29 July 1951) is the former managing director of the Morgan Motor Company, a UK car manufacturer.

The grandson of the founder of the company, H.F.S. Morgan, and the son of the company's former chairman Peter Morgan, Charles Morgan, who had been educated at Oundle public school in the 1960s, joined the family firm full-time in 1985. Previously he had worked for ten years as a news cameraman for ITN and then briefly in the publishing industry. After the Morgan Motor Company was featured on the BBC's Troubleshooter in 1991, he obtained an MBA. In 2013, he was removed as Morgan's managing director and continued as strategy director until October 2013, when he was voted off the company's board. He remains a minority shareholder.

Morgan and the company and other family shareholders promptly sued each other.

In 2019, Morgan and the family sold their entire interest in the company to InvestIndustrial.

== Bibliography ==
- Morgan, Charles; Bowden, Gregory Houston (2008). Morgan 100 Years: The Official History of the World's Greatest Sports Car. Michael O'Mara Books. ISBN 978-1-84317-267-3.
