= Porsche 911 GT2 =

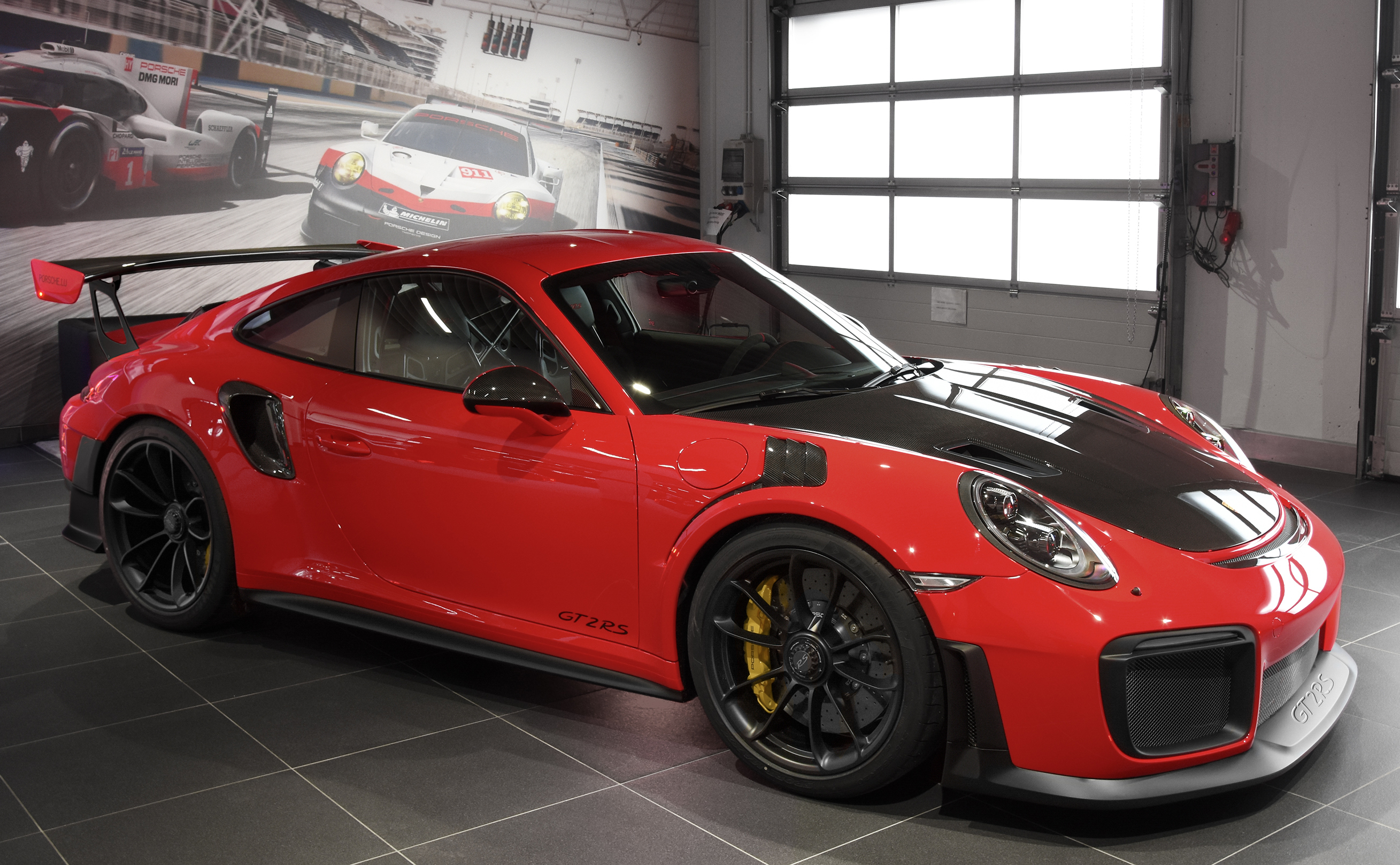
- Porsche 911 GT2 RS (991)

Overview
- Manufacturer: Porsche
- Production: 1993–2019
- Assembly: Germany: Stuttgart, Baden-Württemberg
- Designer: Pinky Lai; Harm Lagaay; Michael Mauer

Body and chassis
- Class: Sports car (S)
- Body style: 2-door coupé
- Layout: Rear-engine, rear-wheel-drive
- Related: Porsche 911 GT3; Porsche 911 Turbo

The Porsche 911 GT2 is a high-performance, track-focused sports car built by the German automobile manufacturer Porsche from 1993 to 2019, and since 2010 as the GT2 RS. It is based on the 911 Turbo, and uses a similar twin-turbocharged engine, but features numerous upgrades, including engine enhancements, larger brakes, and stiffer suspension calibration. The GT2 is significantly lighter than the Turbo due to its use of rear-wheel-drive instead of an all-wheel-drive system and the reduction or removal of interior components. As a result, the GT2 (now GT2 RS) is the most expensive and fastest model among the 911 lineup.

== 993 generation ==
993
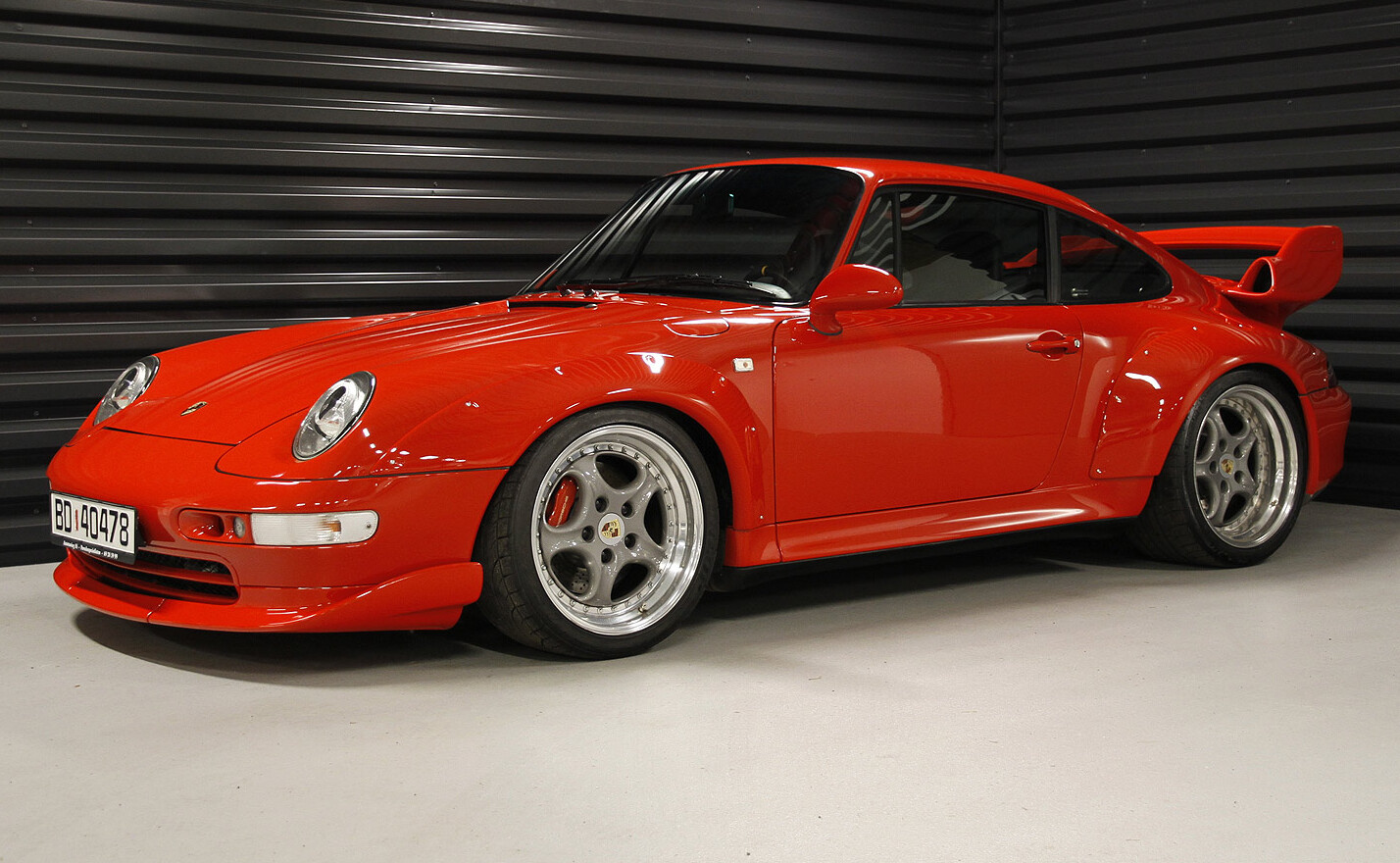

Overview
- Production: 1993–1998

Powertrain
- Engine: 3.6 L twin-turbocharged Porsche M64.60 Flat-6 Engine
- Power output: 316–331 kW (430–450 PS; 424–444 hp)
- Transmission: 6-speed manual

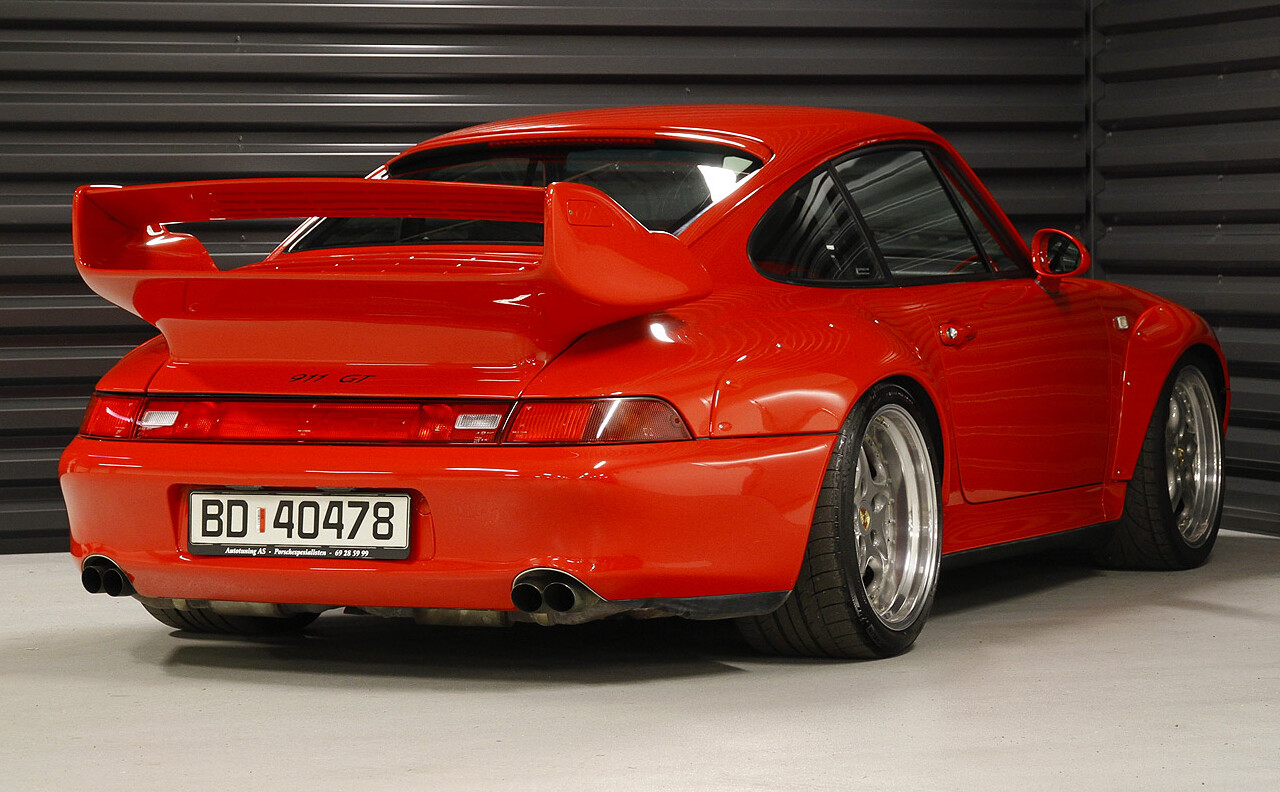
Rear view

The 993 GT2 was initially built in order to meet homologation requirements for GT2 class racing. Because the cars were built to meet the GT2 class regulations, the road cars were named accordingly (but badged as the 911 GT). The 993 GT2 featured widened plastic fenders and a larger rear wing with air scoops in the struts for improved engine cooling. The 993 GT2's original 3.6 L (220 cu in) engine generated a maximum power output of 316 kW (430 PS; 424 hp); in 1998 it was upgraded to 331 kW (450 PS; 444 hp). 57 road cars were built (thirteen of which were right-hand drive).

=== Technical specifications ===
- Configuration: Air-cooled twin-turbocharged 2 valves per cylinder Porsche flat-six engine
- Displacement: 3,600 cc (3.6 L; 219.7 cu in)
- Bore × stroke: 100 mm (3.94 in) × 76.4 mm (3.01 in)
- Maximum power: 316–331 kW (430–450 PS; 424–444 hp) at 6,000 rpm
- Specific power: 93.25 kW/L (2.05 hp/cu in)
- Maximum torque: 586 N⋅m (432 lb⋅ft) at 3,500 rpm (1998 MY)
- Specific torque: 162.7 N⋅m/L (1.97 lb⋅ft/cu in)
- Length: 4,245 mm (167.1 in)
- Width: 1,855 mm (73.0 in)
- Height: 1,270 mm (50.0 in)
- Wheelbase: 2,272 mm (89.4 in)
- Front track: 1,475 mm (58.1 in)
- Rear track: 1,550 mm (61.0 in)
- Curb weight: 1,295 kg (2,855 lb)
- Power-to-weight ratio: 259.2 W/kg (6.34 lb/hp)
- Top speed: 301 km/h (187 mph)
- 0–97 km/h (60 mph): 3.9 seconds
- 0–161 km/h (100 mph): 8.7 seconds
- 1/4 mile (402 m): 12.1 seconds at 188 km/h (117 mph)

== 996 generation ==
996
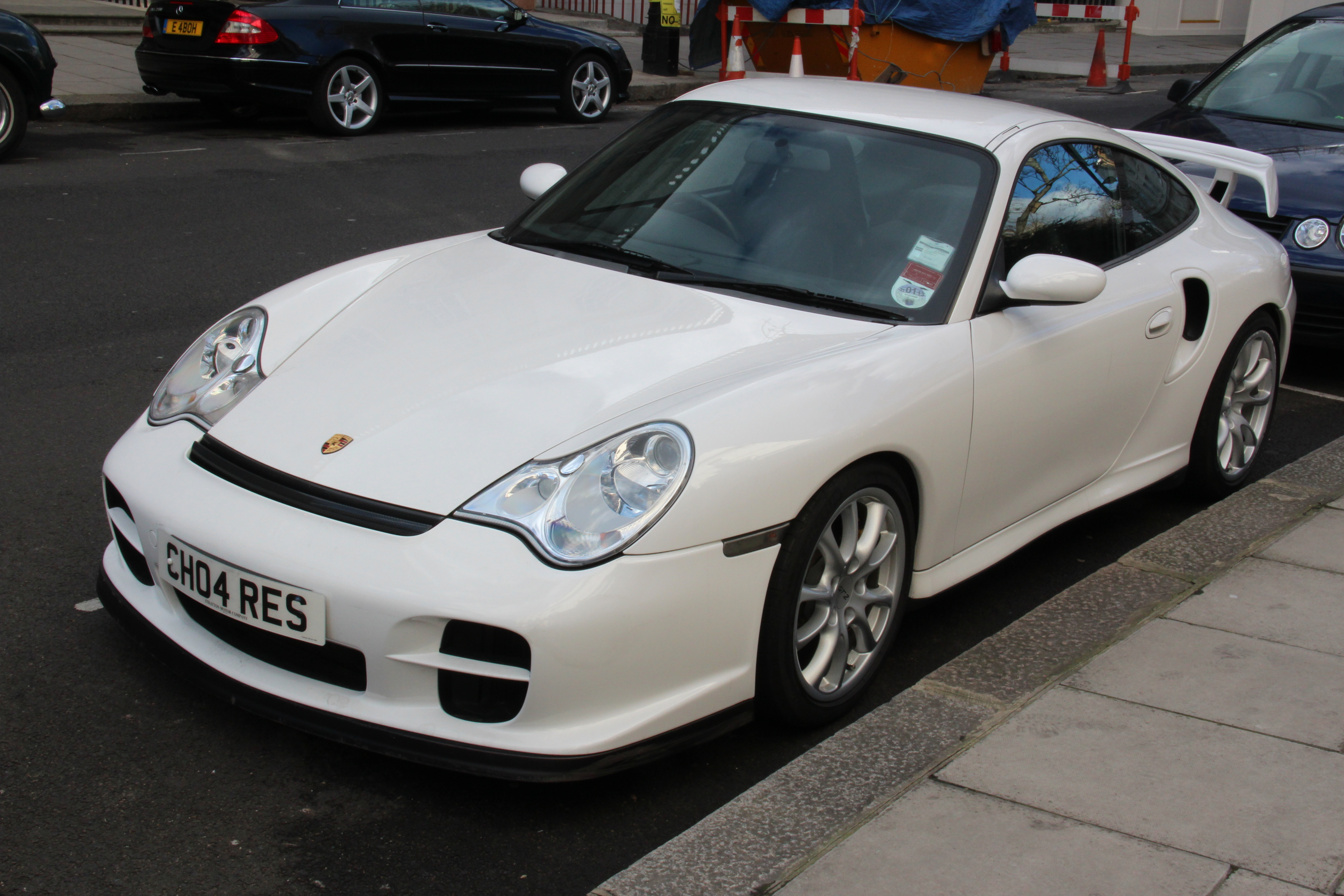

Overview
- Production: 2001–2005

Powertrain
- Engine: 3.6 L twin-turbocharged Porsche M96.70s Flat-6 Engine
- Power output: 340–355 kW (462–483 PS; 456–476 hp)
- Transmission: 6-speed manual

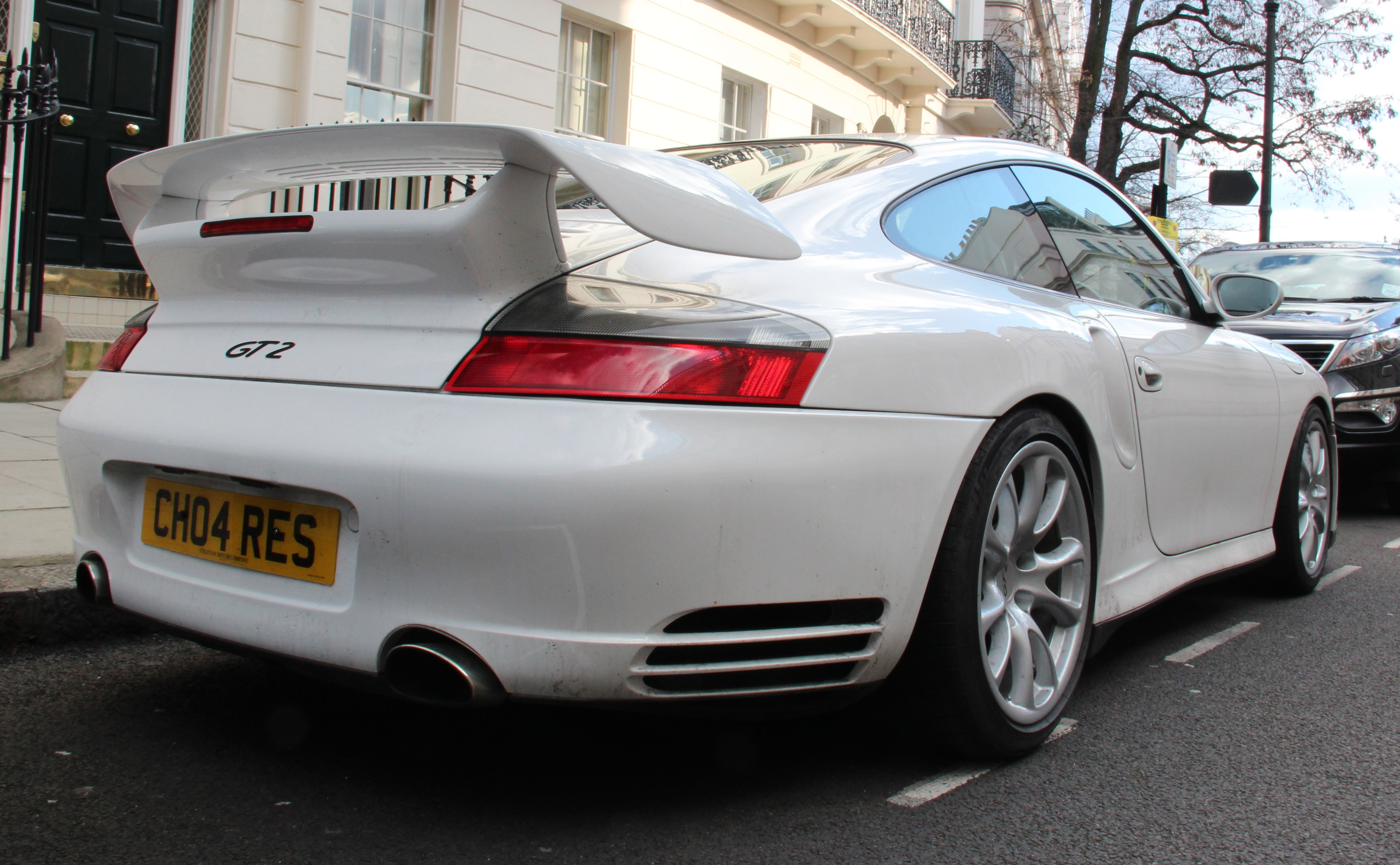
Rear view

In 1999, the 993 was replaced with the new 996 model. The new GT2 took two years to develop and during that time, Porsche decided to abandon the GT2 for motorsports use, instead concentrating on competing in Le Mans GT class racing with the new naturally aspirated 911 GT3.

Developed primarily as a road car in contrast to its predecessor, the new GT2 featured a twin-turbocharged version of the GT3's 3.6 L (220 cu in) flat-six engine. It generated a maximum output of 340 kW (462 PS; 456 hp), which was later increased to 355 kW (483 PS; 476 hp). Like the 993 GT2, the body of the 996 GT2 differed significantly from those of other 996 variants; major differences included wider fenders, a more aggressively shaped nose, and a large rear wing.

According to road testing performed by Car and Driver magazine, the GT2 suffers from hardly any turbo lag. Despite a 10-millimeter reduction in ride height from the 911 Turbo, the drag coefficient is slightly higher — Cd=0.34 vs. the Turbo's 0.33 — due to the fixed rear wing.

=== Technical specifications ===
- Configuration: Water-cooled twin-turbocharged Porsche flat-six engine
- Valvetrain: DOHC 4 valves per cylinder
- Displacement: 3,600 cc (3.6 L; 219.7 cu in)
- Bore × stroke: 100 mm (3.94 in) × 76.4 mm (3.01 in)
- Compression ratio: 9.4:1
- Maximum power: 355 kW (483 PS; 476 hp) at 5,700 rpm
- Specific power: 98.31 kW/L (2.16 hp/cu in)
- Maximum torque: 640 N⋅m (472 lb⋅ft) at 3,500 rpm
- Specific torque: 177.78 N⋅m/L (2.15 lb⋅ft/cu in)
- Length: 4,450 mm (175.2 in)
- Width: 1,830 mm (72.0 in)
- Height: 1,275 mm (50.2 in)
- Wheelbase: 2,355 mm (92.7 in)
- Front track: 1,485 mm (58.5 in)
- Rear track: 1,520 mm (59.8 in)
- Curb weight: 1,430 kg (3,153 lb)
- Drag coefficient: 0.34 $\scriptstyle C_\mathrm d\,$
- Fuel capacity: 89 L (24 US gal)
- Power-to-weight ratio: 248.3 W/kg (6.63 lb/hp)
- Top speed: 319 km/h (198 mph)
- 0–100 km/h (62 mph): 4.1 seconds–3.9 seconds
- 0–200 km/h (124 mph): 13.9 seconds–12.2 seconds
- 1/4 mile (402 m): 12.1 seconds

== 997 generation ==
997
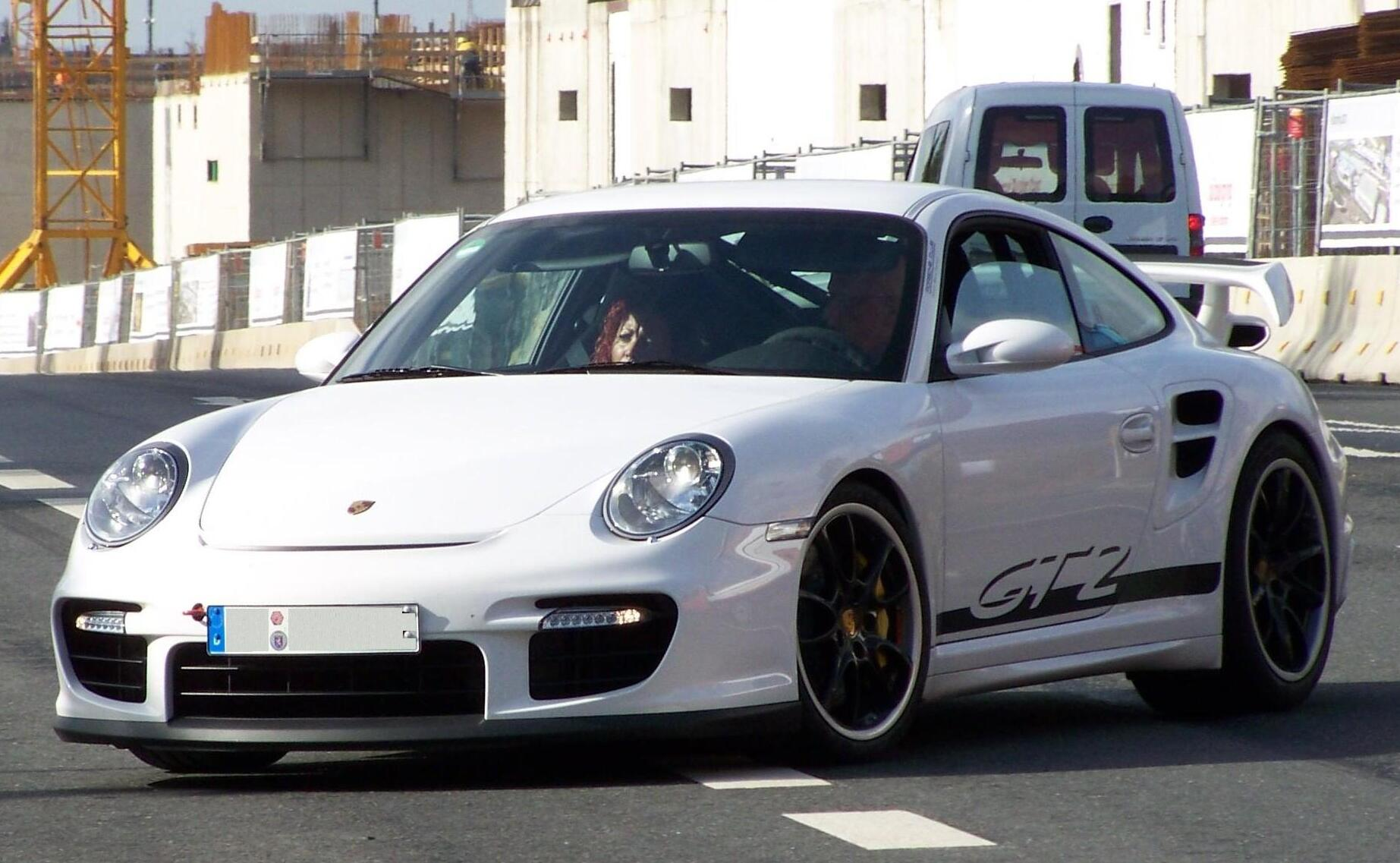

Overview
- Production: 2007–2012

Powertrain
- Engine: 3.6 L twin-turbocharged Porsche M97.70s Flat-6 Engine
- Power output: 390 kW (530 PS; 523 hp) (GT2); 456 kW (620 PS; 612 hp) (GT2 RS)
- Transmission: 6-speed manual

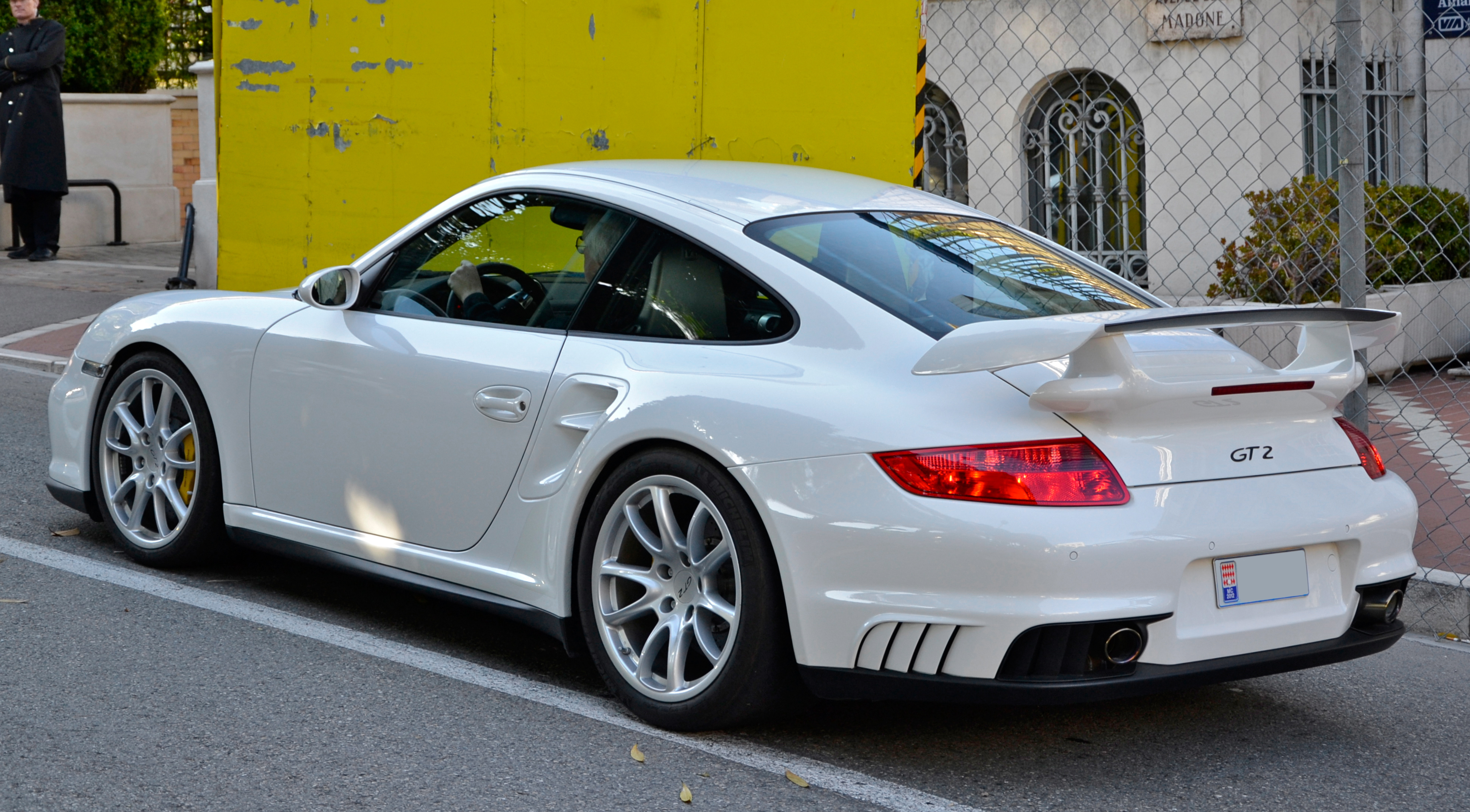
Rear view

The 996 GT2 was superseded by the 997 GT2 in 2007 after a brief hiatus, with cars arriving at dealerships in November 2007 after an official launch at the 62nd Frankfurt Motor Show.

The GT2's engine was based on the 3.6 L (220 cu in) flat-6 engine as seen on the Turbo, but featured two variable geometry turbochargers. The engine generated a maximum power output of 390 kW (530 PS; 523 hp) at 6,500 rpm and 680 N⋅m (502 lb⋅ft) of torque at 2,200 rpm. The GT2 accelerated from 0 to 100 km/h (62 mph) in 3.6 seconds and on to 200 km/h (124 mph) in 10.6 seconds, and had a maximum top speed of 328 km/h (204 mph). This made it the third Porsche production road car to exceed the 322 km/h (200 mph) barrier, with the exception of the 1998 911 GT1 (of which only 20 units were produced for street use, solely to satisfy ACO homologation requirements for racing).

The American automotive magazine Motor Trend tested a 2008 Porsche 911 GT2 and achieved a 0–60 mph (0–97 km/h) acceleration time of 3.4 seconds, and a quarter mile time of 11.4 seconds at 127.9 mph (205.8 km/h). The GT2 also recorded a braking distance from 60 to 0 mph of 98 feet (30 m), and 1.10g of lateral grip.

The appearance of the 997 GT2 once again differed from its sister car, the 997 Turbo. It had a revised front lip, a newly designed rear wing with two small air inlets on either side, and a revised rear bumper featuring titanium exhaust pipes and shark fin outlets.

German Porsche test driver Walter Röhrl lapped the Nürburgring Nordschleife on a public day in 7 minutes, 32 seconds in the 997 GT2.

A total of 194 units were sold in the United States and 19 units in Canada.

=== Technical specifications ===
Technical specifications of the standard 997 GT2:

- Configuration: Water-cooled twin-turbocharged Porsche flat-six engine
- Displacement: 3,600 cc (220 cu in); 4 valves per cylinder
- Bore × stroke: 100 mm (3.94 in) × 76.4 mm (3.01 in)
- Compression ratio: 9.4:1
- Maximum power: 390 kW (530 PS; 523 hp) at 6,500 rpm
- Specific power: 109.8 kW/L (2.41 hp/cu in)
- Maximum torque: 685 N⋅m (505 lb⋅ft) at 2,200 rpm (continuing to 4,500 rpm due to VTG effects)
- Specific torque: 190.3 N⋅m/L (2.30 lb⋅ft/cu in)
- Front brakes: Ventilated carbon ceramic discs with 6-piston monobloc aluminum fixed calipers & ABS
- Rear brakes: Ventilated carbon ceramic discs with 4-piston monobloc aluminum fixed calipers & ABS
- Length: 4,469 mm (175.9 in)
- Width: 1,852 mm (72.9 in)
- Height: 1,285 mm (50.6 in)
- Wheelbase: 2,350 mm (92.5 in)
- Curb weight: 1,438 kg (3,170 lb)
- Drag coefficient: 0.32 $\scriptstyle C_\mathrm d\,$
- Fuel tank capacity: 67 L (18 US gal)
- Luggage Area Volume: 0.1 m^{3} (3.5 cu ft)
- Power-to-weight ratio: 275.0 W/kg (5.98 lb/hp)
- Top speed: 328 km/h (204 mph)
- 0–100 km/h (62 mph): 3.9 seconds
- 0–200 km/h (124 mph): 9.8 seconds

=== Tests performed by American automobile magazine ===
- 0-30 mph (48 km/h): 1.2 seconds
- 0-60 mph (97 km/h): 3.4 seconds
- 0-100 mph (161 km/h): 7.4 seconds
- 0-150 mph (241 km/h): 15.9 seconds
- 0-186 mph (300 km/h): 34.0 seconds
- 1/4 mile (402 m): 11.4 seconds at 205.84 km/h (127.9 mph)

=== 997 GT2 RS ===
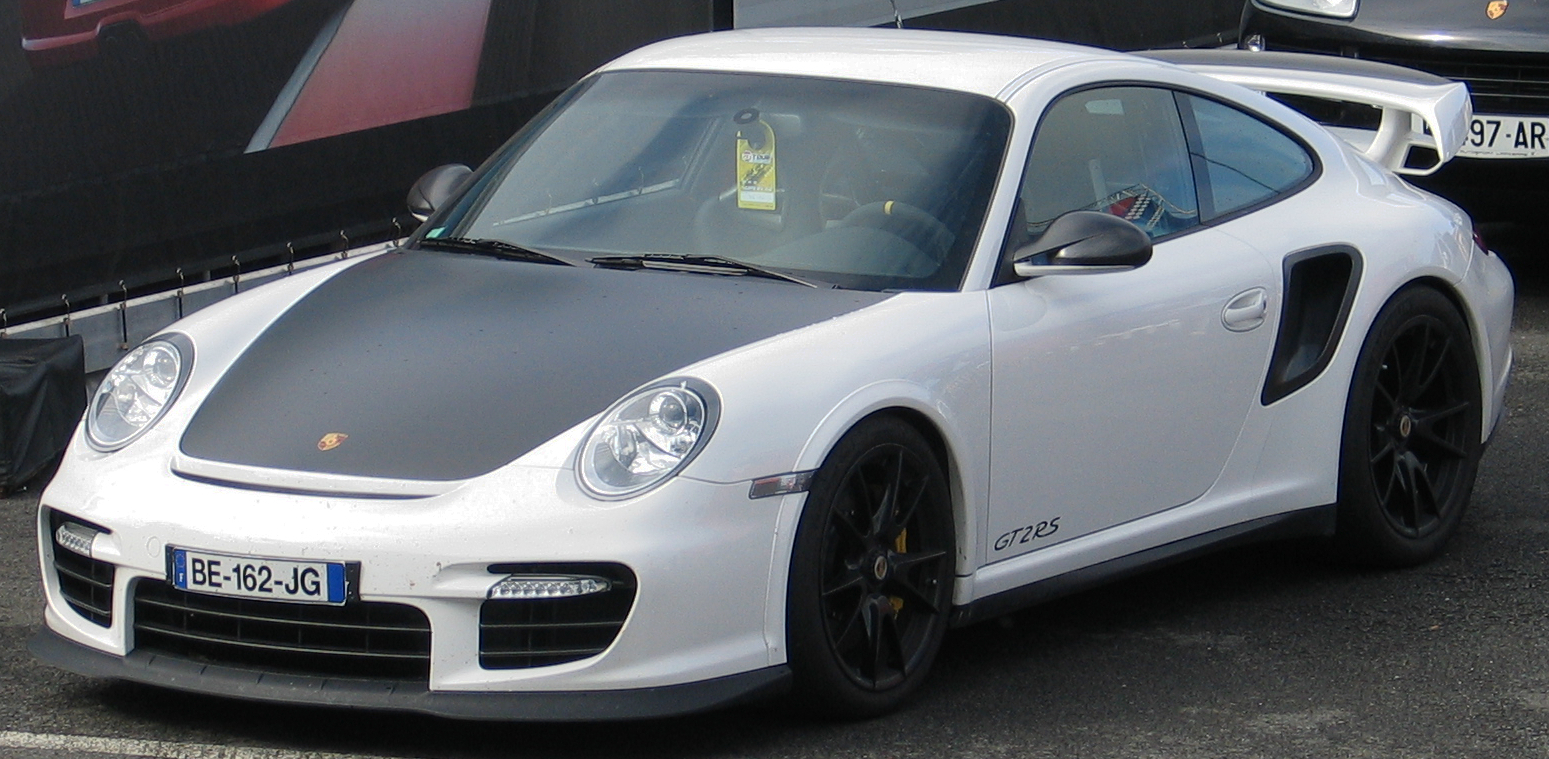
2010 Porsche 911 997 GT2 RS

On 4 May 2010, an RS variant was announced to German dealers in Leipzig. The GT2 RS weighs 70 kg (154 lb) less than the GT2, and the engine generates a maximum power output of 456 kW (620 PS; 612 hp) and 700 N⋅m (516 lb⋅ft) of torque. This allows for a top speed of 330 km/h (205 mph) and a 0–97 km/h (0–60 mph) acceleration time of 3.3 seconds.

According to the then Porsche Motorsports manager Andreas Preuninger, the RS was conceived around 2007 as a skunk-works effort. The 727 code number selected for the project corresponds to one of the Nissan GT-R's lap times around the Nürburgring's Nordschleife. When the dust settled, Porsche claimed that test driver Timo Kluck had supposedly eclipsed that target by nine seconds. Porsche produced only 500 units of the 997 GT2 RS globally.

== 991 generation ==
991 (GT2 RS)

Overview
- Production: June 2017–2019
- Model years: 2018–2020

Powertrain
- Engine: 3.8 L twin-turbocharged Porsche MDH.NA flat-6
- Power output: 515 kW (700 PS; 691 hp), 553 lb⋅ft (750 N⋅m)
- Transmission: 7-speed PDK

Dimensions
- Wheelbase: 2,453 mm (97 in)
- Length: 4,549 mm (179 in)
- Width: 1,880 mm (74 in)
- Height: 1,297 mm (51 in)
- Curb weight: 1,470 kg (3,241 lb)

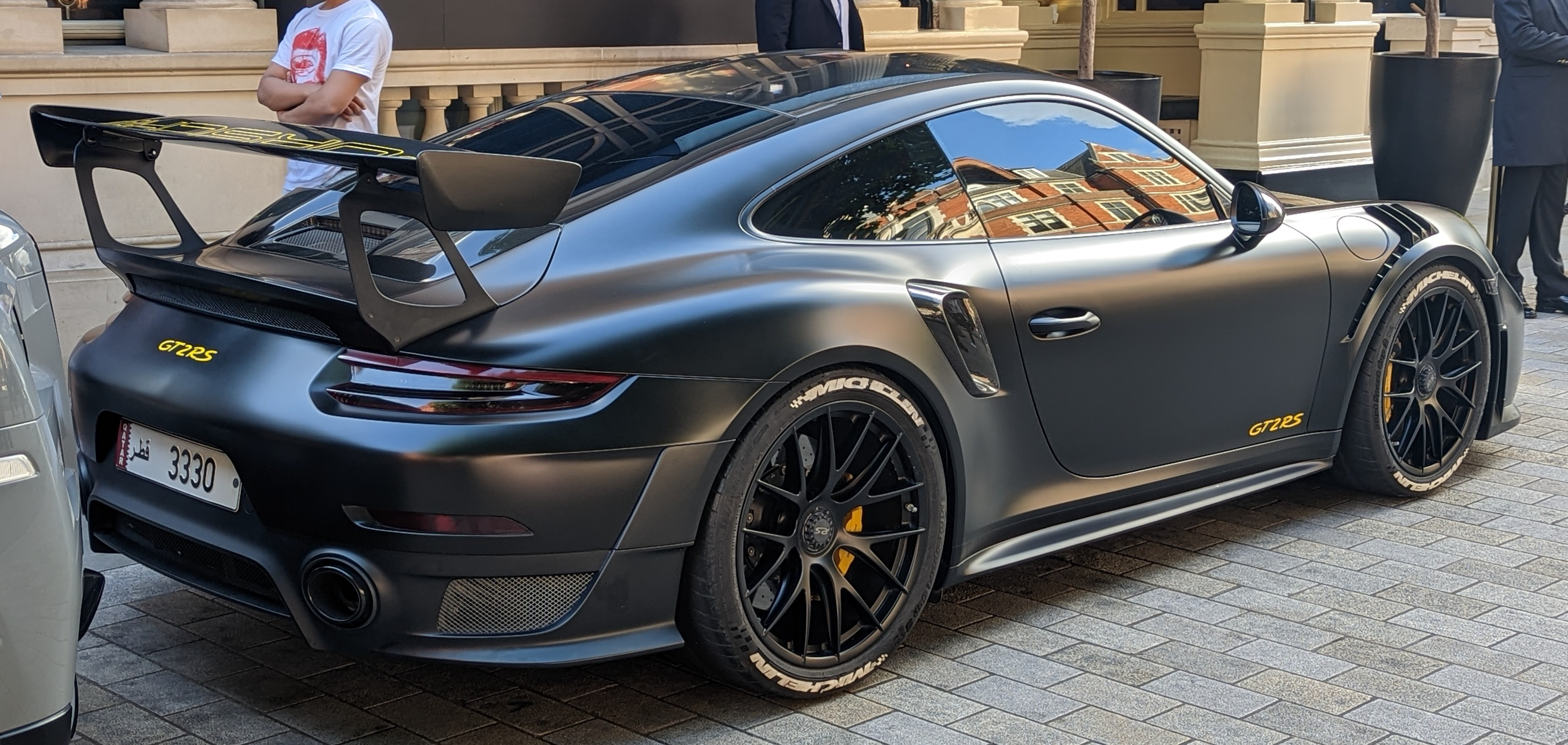
Porsche 911 GT2 RS with Qatar plates in London.

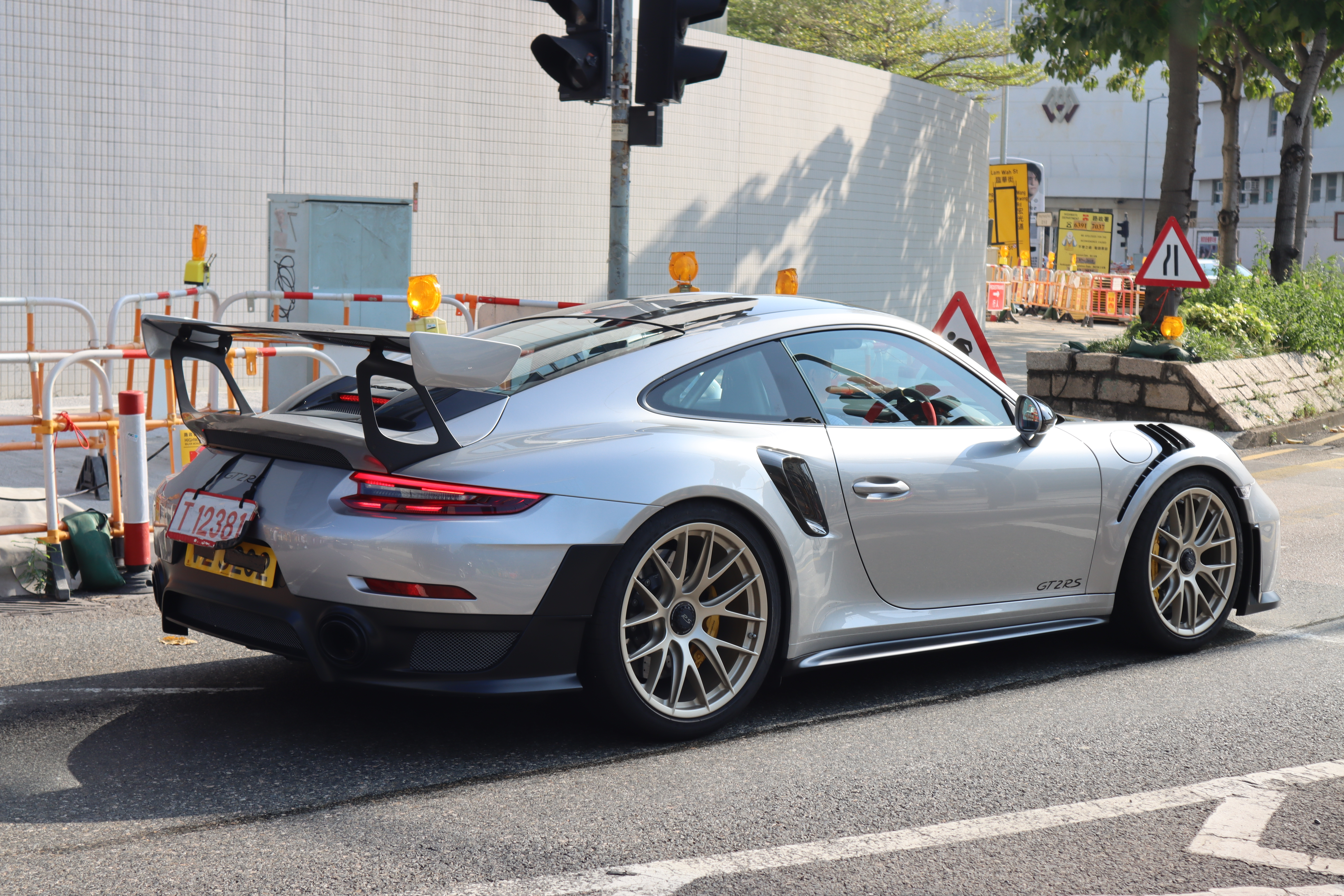
Rear view

The 991 GT2 RS was initially unveiled at the Xbox 2017 E3 briefing along with the announcement of the Forza Motorsport 7 video game where it was revealed as the cover car as well as being included as a playable vehicle.

The car was officially launched by Porsche at the 2017 Goodwood Festival of Speed along with the introduction of the 911 Turbo S Exclusive Series. The 991 GT2 RS is powered by a 3.8 L twin-turbocharged flat-6 engine that has a maximum power output of 515 kW (700 PS; 691 hp) at 7,000 rpm and 750 N⋅m (553 lb⋅ft) of torque, making it the most powerful production 911 variant ever built. Unlike the previous GT2 versions, this car is fitted with a 7-speed PDK transmission to handle the excessive torque produced from the engine. Porsche claims that the car will accelerate from 0–97 km/h (0–60 mph) in 2.7 seconds, and has a top speed of 340 km/h (211 mph).

The car has a roof made of magnesium, front lid, front and rear wings and boot lid made of carbon-fibre, front and rear apron made of lightweight polyurethane, rear and side windows made of polycarbonate and an exhaust system made of titanium. Porsche claims that the car has a wet weight of 1,470 kg (3,241 lb).

A Weissach package option is available, which reduces weight by 30 kg (66 lb), courtesy of the additional use of carbon-fibre and titanium parts. This includes the roof, the anti-roll bars, and the coupling rods on both axles being made out of carbon-fibre, while the roll cage is made from titanium. The package also includes a set of magnesium wheels specially made by BBS. The car was available in the United States from early 2018.

A production run of 1,000 units was planned.

The production run of the GT2 RS was to end by February 2019 but four units were lost in transit to Brazil due to the sinking of the ship Grande America on which the cars were on board in March 2019. Porsche decided to restart production to reproduce the lost cars.

In late September 2017, the 911 GT2 RS driven by Porsche test driver Lars Kern set a 6:47.3 minute lap time around the Nürburgring Nordschleife, averaging a speed of 184.11 km/h (114.40 mph). This made it the fastest production car lap time recorded on the track at the time.

In 2018, Warren Luff at the wheel of the GT2 RS (without the Weissach package) set the fastest production lap record at The Bend Motorsport Park with a lap time of 3:24.079 minutes around the 7.77 km GT layout.

On 25 October 2018, a 6:40.33 minute lap time around the Nürburgring Nordschleife was set by Porsche test driver Lars Kern in a 911 GT2 RS MR prepared by Porsche-owned Manthey Racing, surpassing the previous record holder—an unmodified Lamborghini Aventador SVJ—that had deprived the GT2 RS of its record in July 2018.

In 2019 Porsche set further production lap records with the car at various North American circuits: 1:24.88 minutes at Road Atlanta, 2:15.17 minutes at Road America and 1:22.36 minutes at Canadian Tire Motorsport Park.

=== Technical specifications ===
Technical specifications of the 2018 991.2 GT2 RS:

- Configuration: Water-cooled twin-turbocharged Porsche flat-six engine
- Displacement: 3,800 cc (232 cu in); 4 valves per cylinder
- Bore × stroke: 102.0 mm (4.02 in) × 77.5 mm (3.05 in)
- Compression ratio: 9.0:1
- Redline: 7,000 rpm (rev limiter 7,200 rpm)
- Maximum power: 700 PS (515 kW; 690 hp) at 7,000 rpm
- Specific power: 135.5 kW/litre
- Maximum torque: 750 N⋅m (553 lbf⋅ft) at 2,200-4,500 rpm
- Specific torque: 197.4 N·m/litre
- Transmission: 7-speed PDK
- Front brakes: 410 mm ventilated carbon ceramic discs with 6-piston monobloc aluminum fixed calipers & ABS
- Rear brakes: 390 mm ventilated carbon ceramic discs with 4-piston monobloc aluminum fixed calipers & ABS
- Wheels and Tyres (front): 9.5J × 20 ET50, 265/35 ZR20
- Wheels and Tyres (rear): 12.5J × 21 ET48, 325/30 ZR21
- Length: 4,549 mm (179.1 in)
- Width: 1,880 mm (74.0 in)
- Height: 1,297 mm (51.1 in)
- Wheelbase: 2,453 mm (96.6 in)
- Front track: 1,558 mm (61.3 in)
- Rear track: 1,557 mm (61.3 in)
- Curb weight: 1,470 kg (3,241 lb) (DIN)
- Power-to-weight ratio: 350.3 W/kg
- Fuel tank capacity: 64 L (17 US gal)
- Luggage Area Volume: 115 L (4.1 cu ft)
- Drag coefficient: 0.35 $\scriptstyle C_\mathrm d\,$
- Top speed: 340 km/h (211 mph)
- 0–97 km/h (60 mph): 2.7 seconds
- 0–100 km/h (62 mph): 2.8 seconds
- 0–160 km/h (99 mph): 5.8 seconds
- 0–200 km/h (124 mph): 8.3 seconds
- 0–300 km/h (186 mph): 22.1 seconds
- 80–120 km/h (50–75 mph): 1.5 seconds
- 100–200 km/h (62–124 mph): 5.5 seconds
- 1/4 mile (402 m): 10.5 seconds
- Turning radius: 11.1 metre

=== GT2 RS Clubsport ===
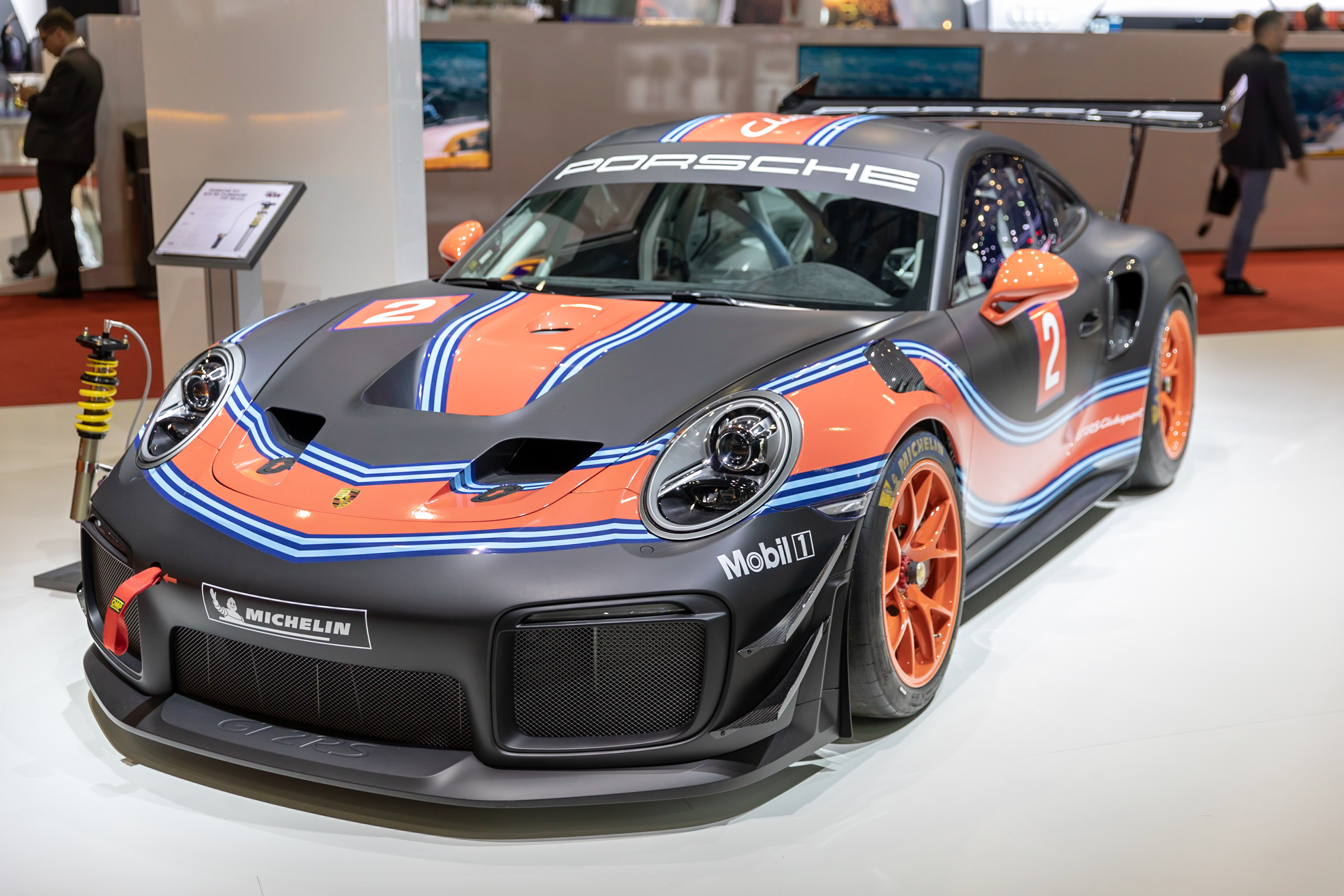
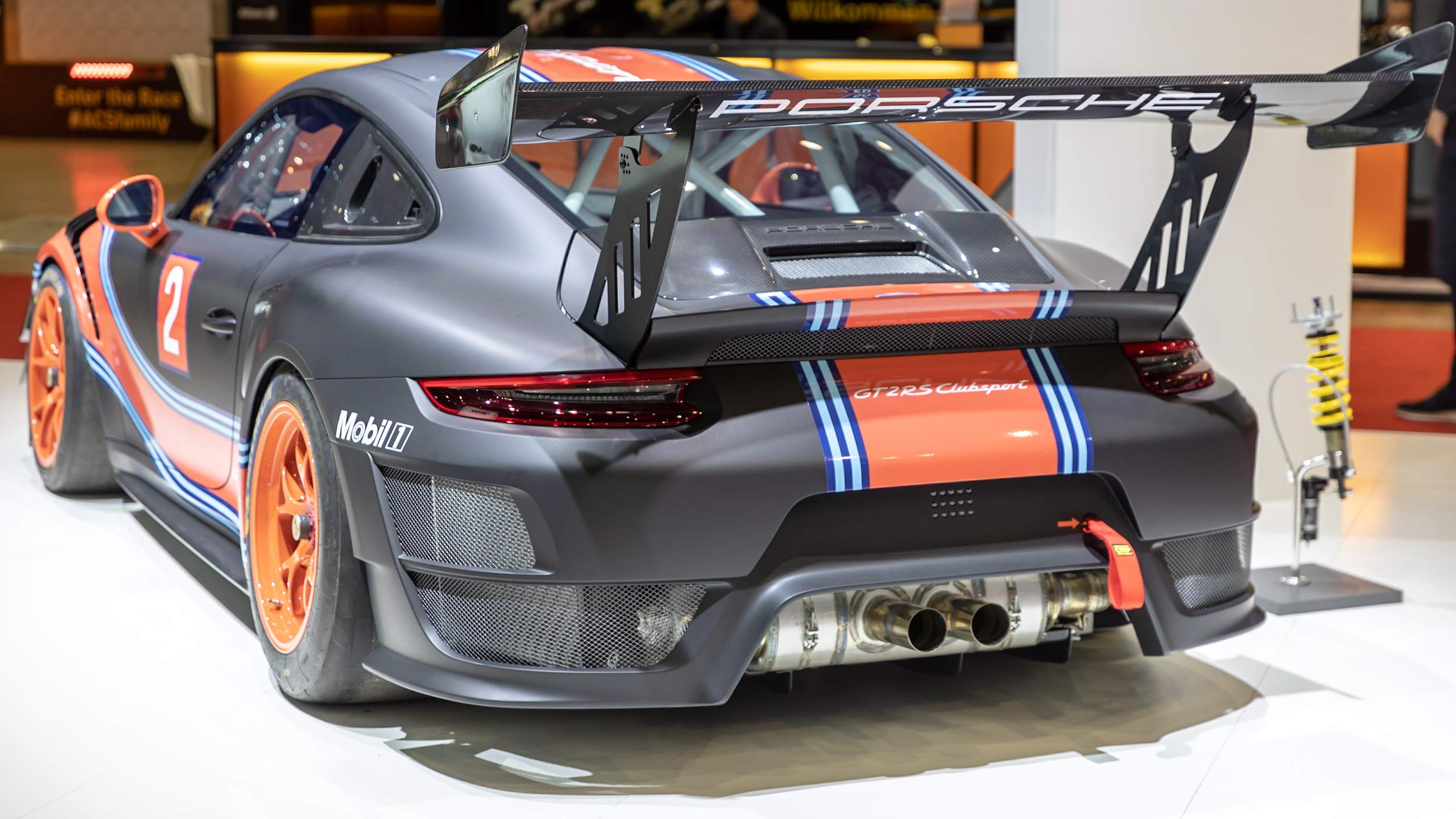
991 GT2 RS Clubsport

Introduced at the 2018 LA Auto Show, the GT2 RS Clubsport is the track-only variant of the GT2 RS. New aerodynamic elements increase downforce of the car while removal of non essential components decrease weight further. Notable exterior changes include a larger motor sport oriented rear wing made from carbon fibre shared with the GT3 R, larger front air intakes with integrated LED day time running lights, carbon fibre roof with an integrated escape hatch in case of a crash, carbon fibre engine cover and bonnet along with a racing fuel cell and a new race exhaust system.

The interior is race oriented and notable changes include an FIA-approved roll cage, a single racing bucket seat and a race steering wheel made from carbon fibre with an integrated colour display shared with the GT3 R. The car weighs a total of 1,390 kg (3,064 lb), 80 kg (176 lb) less than the GT2 RS road car.

The engine and transmission remain the same as the GT2 RS while new safety features include a PSM stability management system and an ABS system, both of which are manually controlled by rotary dials present on the centre console. The GT2 RS Clubsport comes with 18-inch centre lock forged alloy wheels wrapped in Michelin racing slicks and are shared with the GT3 R race car. Production of the Clubsport is limited to 200 units.

The SRO Motorsports Group announced a one make series featuring the GT2 RS Clubsport which was held in July 2019 at the 24 Hours of Spa Weekend. Previously, the Clubsport made its track debut at the Bathurst 12 Hour event held in the January of that same year.

== Motorsports ==
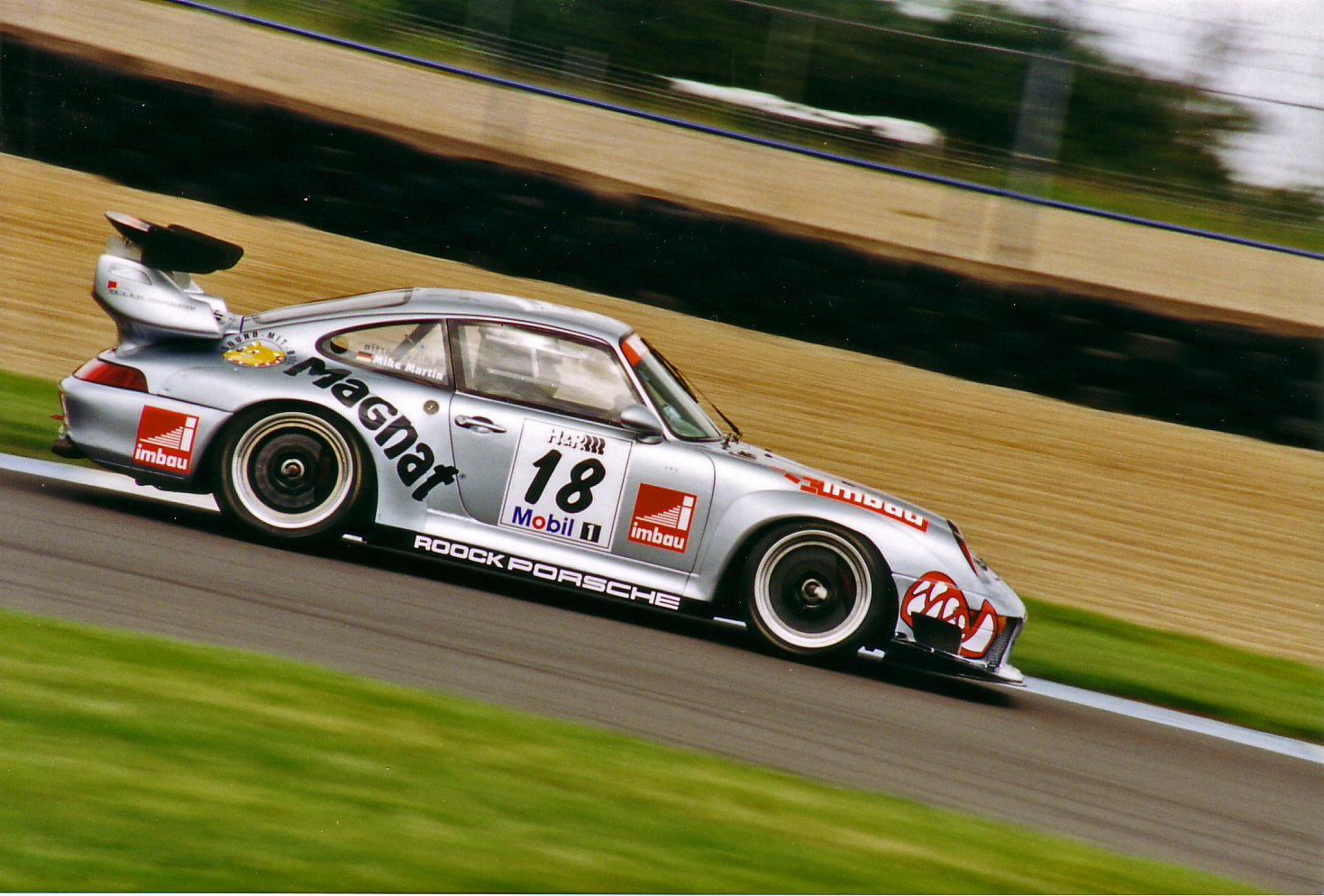
Roock Racing Porsche 993 GT2 at Donington in 1997

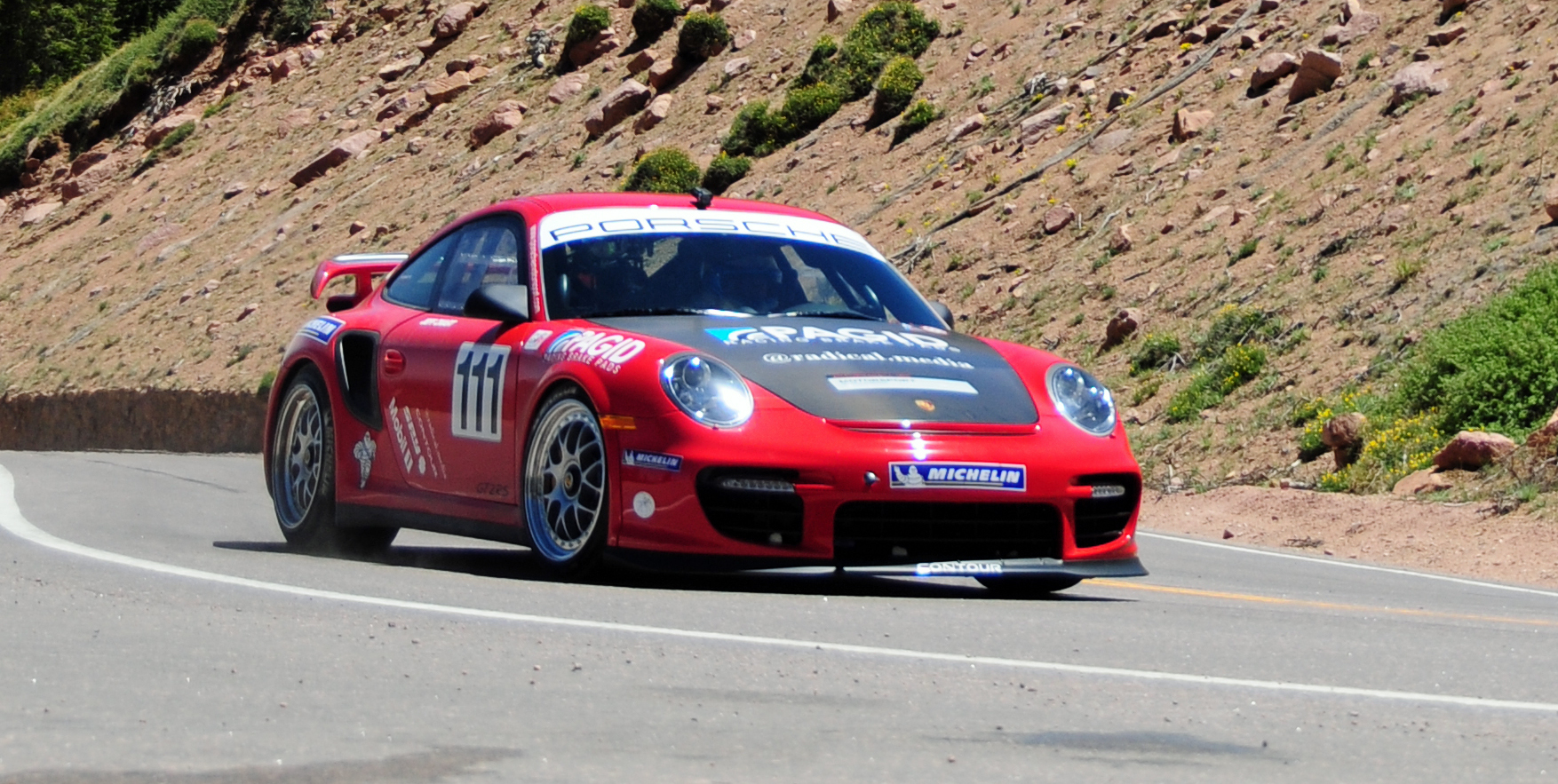
Jeff Zwart with the Porsche 997 GT2 RS during the 2011 Pikes Peak International Hill Climb

The Porsche GT2 comes from a long line of 911 Porsche Turbo racing cars in international motorsports. Starting with the 1974 911 Carrera turbo for Group 5 racing, followed by the 934 (a racing version of the 930) for Group 4 racing, then the famous Porsche 935 which dominated Group 5 and IMSA racing through 1984. In 1986 a Porsche 961 (racing version of the 959) would be created with little racing success but a leap forward in technology and development such as AWD, 4 valves per cylinder and water-cooled heads (which first appeared in the 1978 Porsche 935 Moby-Dick, used in the Porsche 956/962 Group C prototypes and then in the 959/961). In 1993, Porsche had experimented with the extensively modified turbo 964, named the Turbo S LM-GT. Seeing the car's potential to be fast and reliable, as well as customer demand for a car to replace the 964 Carrera RSRs, Porsche chose to develop the turbocharged 993 for customer use.

The 993 GT2 race car featured a stripped interior, integrated rollcage for safety, minor adjustments to the bodywork and wings in order to decrease weight as well as increase downforce, and wider fenders to handle racing slicks. The suspension was modified to improve racing performance, while the engine was slightly tweaked for endurance. Twin KKK turbochargers, fitted with required air restrictors, allowed for 335.7 kW (450 hp).

At the same time, Porsche also developed a GT2 Evo, able to race in the GT1 category. The Evo saw an increase in power to 447.6 kW (600 hp) through the use of larger turbochargers. Other modifications included a new, higher-mounted rear wing, larger fenders to house the wider tires allowed in the GT1 class, and a decrease in weight to 1,100 kg (2,425 lb). The GT2 Evo was short-lived, however, as Porsche decided to replace it with the purpose-built 911 GT1 in 1996.

The GT2 and GT2 Evo were initially campaigned in the BPR Global GT Series as well as several other smaller national series, and earned seven wins in their class out of eleven rounds during their first full BPR season in 1996, as well as a class victory in the 1996 and 1997 24 Hours of Le Mans. In the new FIA GT Championship that year, although Porsche faced factory-backed competition from Chrysler, the 911 GT2s managed to win three races. By 1998, however, the capabilities of the GT2 were unable to combat the increased number of Chrysler Viper GTS-Rs in the series, earning only a single victory.

By 1999, the GT2s had been largely overpowered by the Vipers, as well as newcomers Lister. Despite this, a GT2 prepared by Roock Racing managed to win the GT2 class at the 24 Hours of Daytona. An increase in engine displacement to 3.8 liters in 2000 was unable to help Porsche, and support for the project ended. Porsche chose instead to concentrate on the new N-GT category with the GT3-R that same year. GT2s continued to be used by private teams until 2004.

With the launch of the 996 generation GT2, several privateers attempted to continue on the motorsports history by building their own racing versions. Belgian PSI Motorsports' 996 Bi-Turbo and German A-Level Engineering's 996 GT2-R were used with moderate success in national series such as the Spanish GT Championship and Belcar.

=== Modern GT2 ===
Porsche became the first manufacturer to commit to the new SRO GT2 category launched in 2018, with the Porsche 911 GT2 RS Clubsport. The car has since competed in GT Sports Club America in 2020 and in the GT2 European Series from 2021 onward. An Evo kit for the car was introduced in 2023.
