= H. F. S. Morgan =

English sports car manufacturer (1881–1959)

Henry "Harry" Morgan
- Born: Henry Frederick Stanley Morgan; August 1881; Moreton Jeffries, Herefordshire, England
- Died: 1959 (aged 77–78); Malvern, Worcestershire, England
- Occupation: Automobile manufacturer
- Spouse: (Hilda) Ruth Day
- Children: Peter Morgan
- Parent(s): Prebendary (Henry) George Morgan (1852–1936); Florence Williams

Henry Frederick Stanley Morgan (1881–1959), known as HFS, was an English sports car manufacturer and founder of the Morgan Motor Company (MMC) and its chairman from 1937 until his death in 1959.

== Biography ==
Henry 'Harry' Morgan was born in Moreton Jeffries Rectory, Stoke Lacy, Herefordshire, where his father, Prebendary H. George Morgan, was the local curate, and spent his early years there along with his three younger sisters, Frieda, Ethel and Dorothy. He attended Marlborough School but suffered from poor health possibly caused by malnutrition and was withdrawn by his parents and sent to Italy to recover. On returning he went to the Crystal Palace School of Engineering in Sydenham London and then joined the Great Western Railway company as an apprentice. It was during this period that he survived a brake failure while driving a hired 3½ hp Benz on a 1 in 6 gradient between Bromyard and Hereford. Paternal joy over his survival may have been slightly tempered by the resulting £28 repair bill received by his father. In 1902 with the help of a gift from his godfather he bought his first car, a Star.

He left the GWR in late 1904 and with his friend Leslie Bacon opened a motor sales and servicing garage in Malvern Link in May 1905 with agencies for Darracq and Wolseley cars. As well as this, he ran early bus services between Malvern Link and Malvern Wells, and later to Gloucester, with a 10 hp (7.5 kW; 10 PS) Wolseley. The bus service was a failure, so Morgan switched to hire cars.

In 1908, he bought a 7 hp (5.2 kW; 7.1 PS) Peugeot twin cylinder engine intending to build himself a motor cycle, but changed his mind and used it to power his first car, which he made in 1909 with help from William Stephenson-Peach, the father of friends, and the engineering master at Malvern College, where Morgan was allowed use of the well equipped workshop. The three-wheel car had a backbone chassis, one seat, and coil spring independent front suspension, unusual at the time.

With financial help from his father and his wife, the car was put into production at premises in Malvern Link adjacent to Chestnut Lodge, the house his father had bought him, and three single-seaters exhibited at the 1910 Motor Show at Olympia in London. In spite of great interest being shown, only a few orders were taken, and he decided that a two-seater was needed to meet the market demands. This was built in 1911, displayed at the 1911 Motor Cycle Show. An agency was taken up by the Harrods department store in London, with a selling price of £65. The Morgan became the only car ever to appear in a shop window at Harrods.

As a way of boosting sales a policy of involvement in motor sport, often with Morgan himself driving (sometimes joined by his wife), was established. This began as early as 1912, when Morgan set out to win the trophy offered by The Light Car & Cyclecar for greatest distance covered in an hour, at Brooklands. The single-seater covered 55 mi (89 km), only to be narrowly beaten by a GWK; Morgan returned later the same year, reaching nearly 60 mi (97 km). Morgan also won the "very tough" ACU Six Days' Trial in 1913.

Sales grew steadily up to the outbreak of World War I. Although some car manufacture continued, the factory was turned over mainly to munitions, and the factory was extended.

Post-war the company prospered, and in 1921 HFS was able to buy a Rolls-Royce car, with body built by Morgan, and in 1925 moved to a larger house, Fern Lodge.

HFS married a vicar's daughter, (Hilda) Ruth Day, in 1912. Their son Peter, born 1919, would in turn become chairman of the company.
