= Morgan Plus 8 =

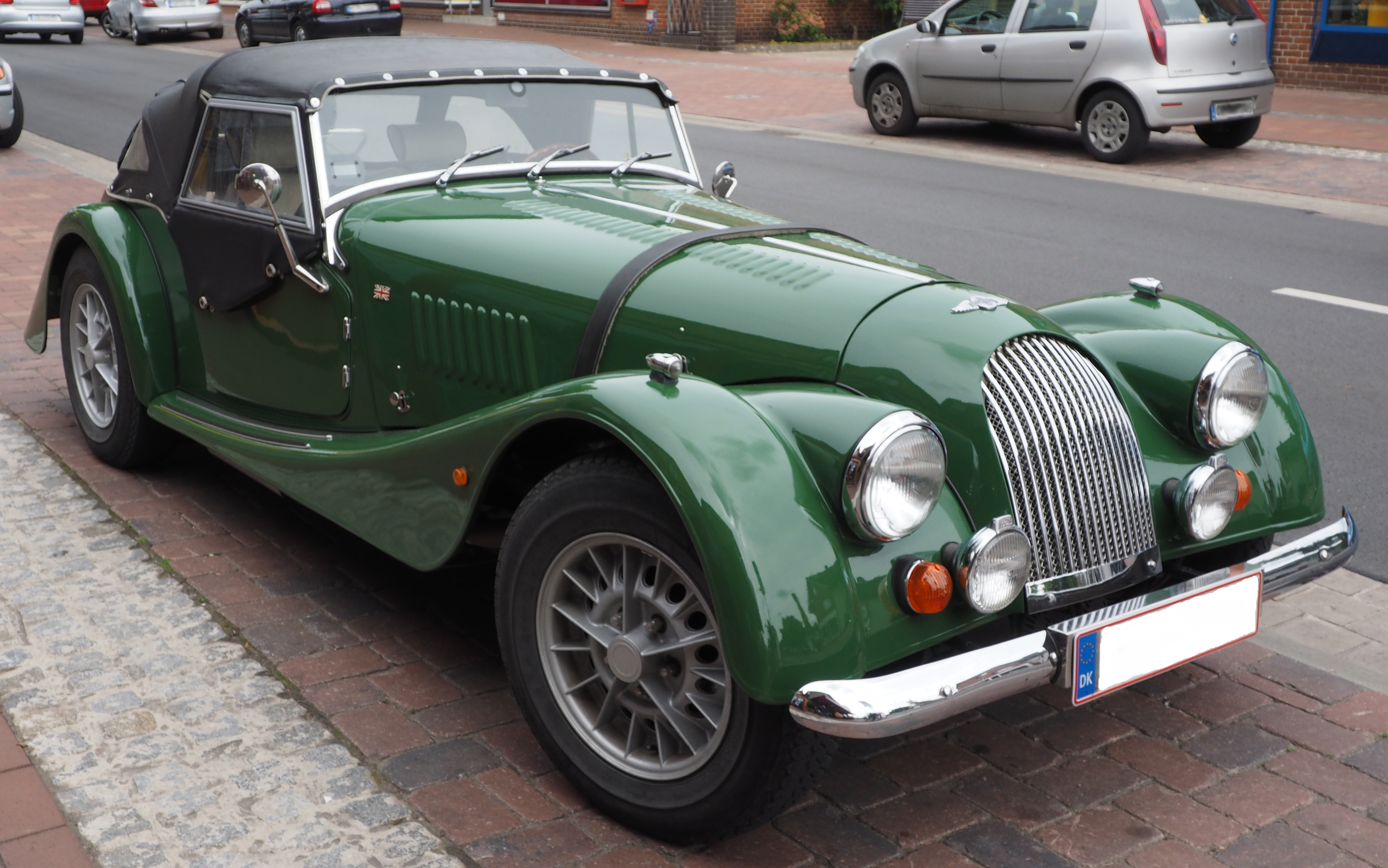
- Morgan Plus 8

Overview
- Manufacturer: Morgan Motor Company
- Production: 1968–2004; 2012–2018
- Assembly: Malvern, Worcestershire, England, United Kingdom

Body and chassis
- Class: Sports car
- Body style: 2-door roadster
- Layout: FR layout
- Related: Morgan 4/4; Morgan +4

Powertrain
- Engine: Rover V8 OHV; 3.5L Rover V8; 3.9L Rover V8; 4.6L Rover V8; BMW V8 DOHC; 4.8L BMW V8
- Transmission: 4-speed manual (1968–77); 5-speed manual (1977–2004); 6-speed manual (2012–2018); 6-speed automatic (2012–2018; Optional)

Dimensions
- Wheelbase: 98 in (2,489 mm)
- Length: 146 in (3,708 mm)
- Width: 57.5–67.0 in (1,460–1,702 mm)
- Height: 52 in (1,321 mm)
- Kerb weight: 1,876 lb (851 kg)

Chronology
- Successor: Morgan Plus Six

The Morgan Plus 8 is a sports car built by British car maker Morgan from 1968 to 2004 and again in revised form between 2012 and 2018. Its instant and enduring popularity has been credited with saving the company and keeping the company famous during the 36 years of its manufacture. Among Morgan enthusiasts, it is deeply associated with Peter Morgan, the owner-chairman behind its design.

== Design ==
The development of the Plus 8 was led by Maurice Owen, an engineer taken on specifically for the role. The Plus 8 prototype was based on a modified chassis from the Plus 4, altered to accept the Rover alloy block 215 cu in (3.5 L) V8, purchased from GM-Buick in 1967. Plus 4's Moss gearbox was carried over and the Salisbury 7HA axle was uprated with a limited-slip differential. The chassis was developed in stages to accommodate gearbox changes in 1973 and 1976, 1995 the body widened in 1976 to accommodate the widened chassis and the wings widened to accommodate larger tyres to handle the increasing power and trend for lower profile and wider tyres. The original 1968 Plus 8 was 57 inches (1,400 mm) wide and the last was 64 inches (1,600 mm) (with an optional "widebody" at 67 inches (1,700 mm)) From the 1960s and (according to all auto magazines) through the 1980s for acceleration between 20-80mph, the Plus Eight was the fastest-accelerating UK production car. To this day, early Plus 8s are frequently the winners in the 1960-1970 class in the UK.

In 2002, Morgan created a "LeMans Edition" with similar exterior feature to the 1960s Plus 4 LeMans winner. In 2003, Morgan created a 35th year "Anniversary Edition" of the Plus 8. The 35th Anniversary model was built in 100 examples and has a walnut dashboard, mesh behind the grille bars, a "LeMans style" gear knob, and a badge on the rear panel. The original brochure also referenced the fact that the Plus 8 was to be discontinued the following year.

Following the discontinuation of the Rover V8, production of Plus 8 ended in 2004. A revised Aero, powered by a 4.8-litre BMW N62B48 V8 engine, was placed on an Aero chassis, with Aero 8 suspension, axles, brakes, steering, gearbox, and altered wings was introduced in 2012, They also called this model "Plus 8" and it was sold concurrently with the Aero 8 from that date until the elimination of the Aero line-up in 2020.

In 2014, Morgan created another edition called the Plus 8 'Speedster' models based on the later Aero configuration noted above. It began as a limited edition, but production was not limited to the originally advertised 60 examples. This limited run forwent the traditional roof in favour of a small fly screen and hidden roll bars behind the front seats. Pitched as an entry-level Plus 8 model, they went on sale for £69,999.

== Engines ==
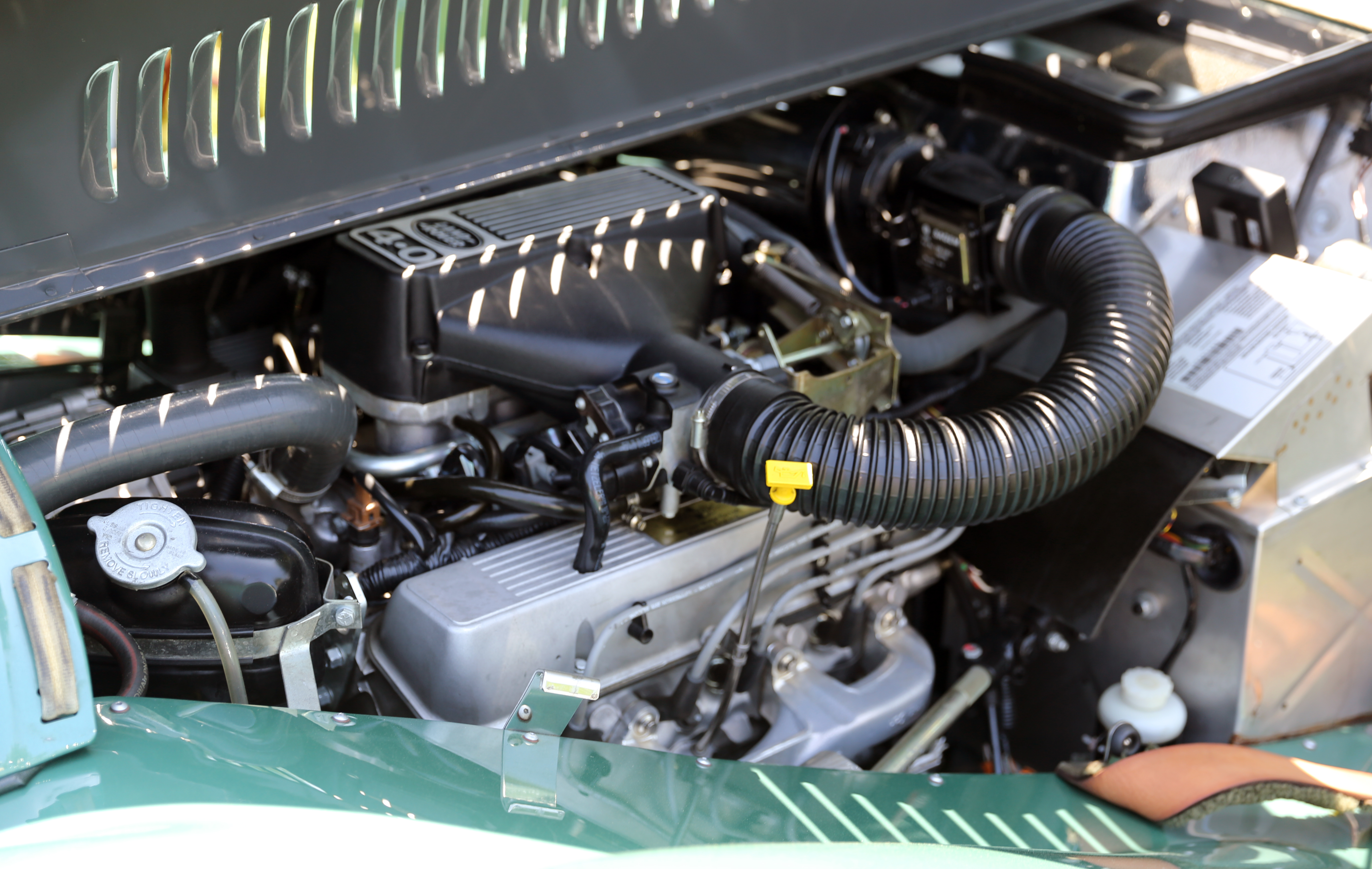
4.0 litre V8 engine in a 2003 Morgan Plus 8 35th Anniversary Edition

The original Plus 8 engines were Rover V8s that became available when fitted to the P5B saloon. Morgan was actually the first of a succession of sports car makers – including the likes of TVR and Marcos – to use the engine.

The prototype Plus 8 (identifiable by two small bonnet bulges near the centre bonnet hinge) used a Buick 215 V8 engine but the production Plus 8 was launched in 1968 using Rover's production engine, a re-engineered version of the Buick 215 motor (renamed the 3.5 L by Rover) with a compression of 10.5:1 originally fuelled by two SU HS6 carburettors. The high 10.5:1 CR was only usable because 5* (101 octane) petrol was then still available. By 1973, the Rover 3500 saloon was available with a manual 4 speed gearbox and this engine/gearbox configuration was adopted by Morgan although the compression dropped to 9.25:1 with a resulting drop in power. With the adoption of an improved version of the engine developed for the Rover SD1 in 1977, compression increased to 9.35:1 and power increased slightly. After 1981 the engine was fueled by two Stromberg CD175 carburettors, which increased the power as the SUs were not a perfect match for the engine. There is a substantial leap in power if the earlier mentioned carbs are swapped out for a Holley 390 or, preferably, a Weber/Edelbrock/Carter 500.

At the end of 1983, the company offered an EFI version using a Bosch L-Jetronic based system. With the added power, up to 204 bhp (152 kW; 207 PS), and low weight. Contemporary magazine road tests noted its performance relative to Porches up to 90 mph (140 km/h). Power output declined in subsequent years until the end of production in 2004. From 1990 a 3.9-litre version of the engine (marketed by Rover as a "4.0") fitted with the Lucas 14CUX fuel injection system was produced. Rover/Land Rover-engined Plus 8 models between 1976 (SD1) and the GEMS system can be modified to generate greater power, drawing on the British, American and Australian aftermarkets.

In 1996, the Rover 4.6 L engine became an option, still using the Lucas 14CU fuel injection system. From 1998 the overseas model began to use the GEMS fuelling system and by 2000 all Morgan Plus 8s were fuelled by the GEMS system as used on the Range Rover P38A between 1994 and 1999.

On the 2012 Geneva Motor Show, Morgan introduced a new edition of the Plus 8 roadster, powered by a 4.8-litre BMW V8 engine. At the same show, Morgan also introduced an electric version of the Plus 8 roadster – called the Plus E – which is powered by a Zytek 70 kW (94 bhp) 300Nm electric motor.

== United States sales ==
For almost two decades during the 1950s and 1960s, North America took the greater bulk of Morgan production. Popularity in the UK and Europe had greatly fallen during that era. The era ended with the advent of the strong emission and structural laws. Luckily, the failure of the modern looking +4+ and the arrival of the powerful Plus 8 rekindled interest in the home market in the whole line.

In the US, a way was found to keep importing Morgans after 1974. From 1974 to 1992, all imported Morgans (of which 98 percent were Plus 8s) to the United States were converted to run on propane as fuel to pass U.S. emissions regulations.

When the Rover Group re-certified their V8 engine for use in the Range Rover SUV sold in the U.S., Morgan made a petrol-powered +8 available with the same engine in the same tune and with the same anti-emission devices. As safety regulations continue to change, Morgan was again challenged in 2006 to meet the new structural requirements announced by the NHTSA in 2000. A request for an exemption to the law on airbags was refused and the importation of traditional (classic) Morgans ceased.

== Gearboxes ==
- 1968–1972 Moss gearbox, a 4-speed manual transmission with synchromesh 2nd, 3rd, and 4th
- 1972–1977 Rover 3500s, 4-speed all-synchromesh manual transmission used in the Rover 3500S saloon
- 1977–1995 Rover LT77, 5-speed all-synchromesh manual transmission
- 1995–2004 Rover R380, 5-speed all-synchromesh manual transmission
- 2012 6-speed manual transmission (6-speed automatic transmission optional)

== Gallery ==
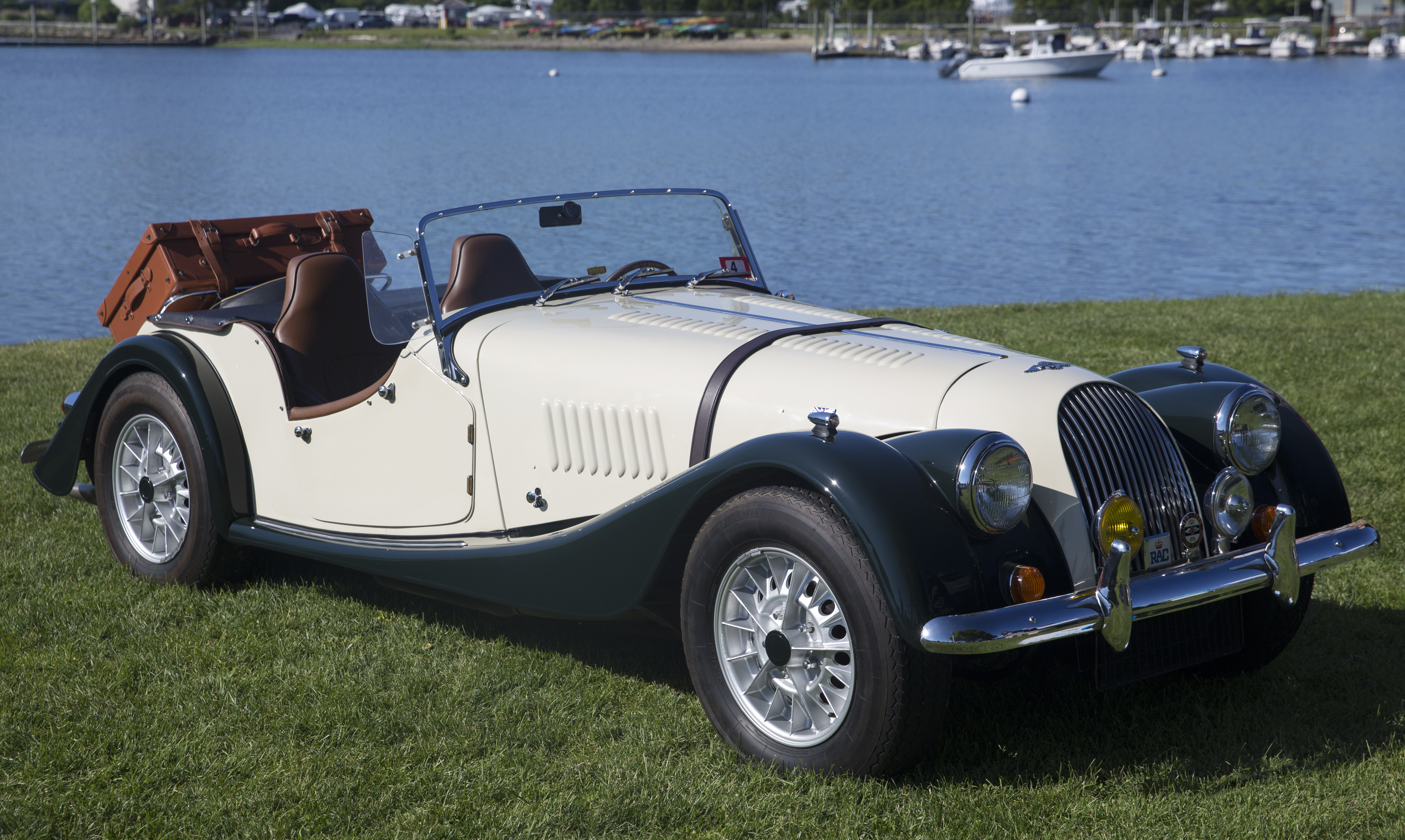
1971 model

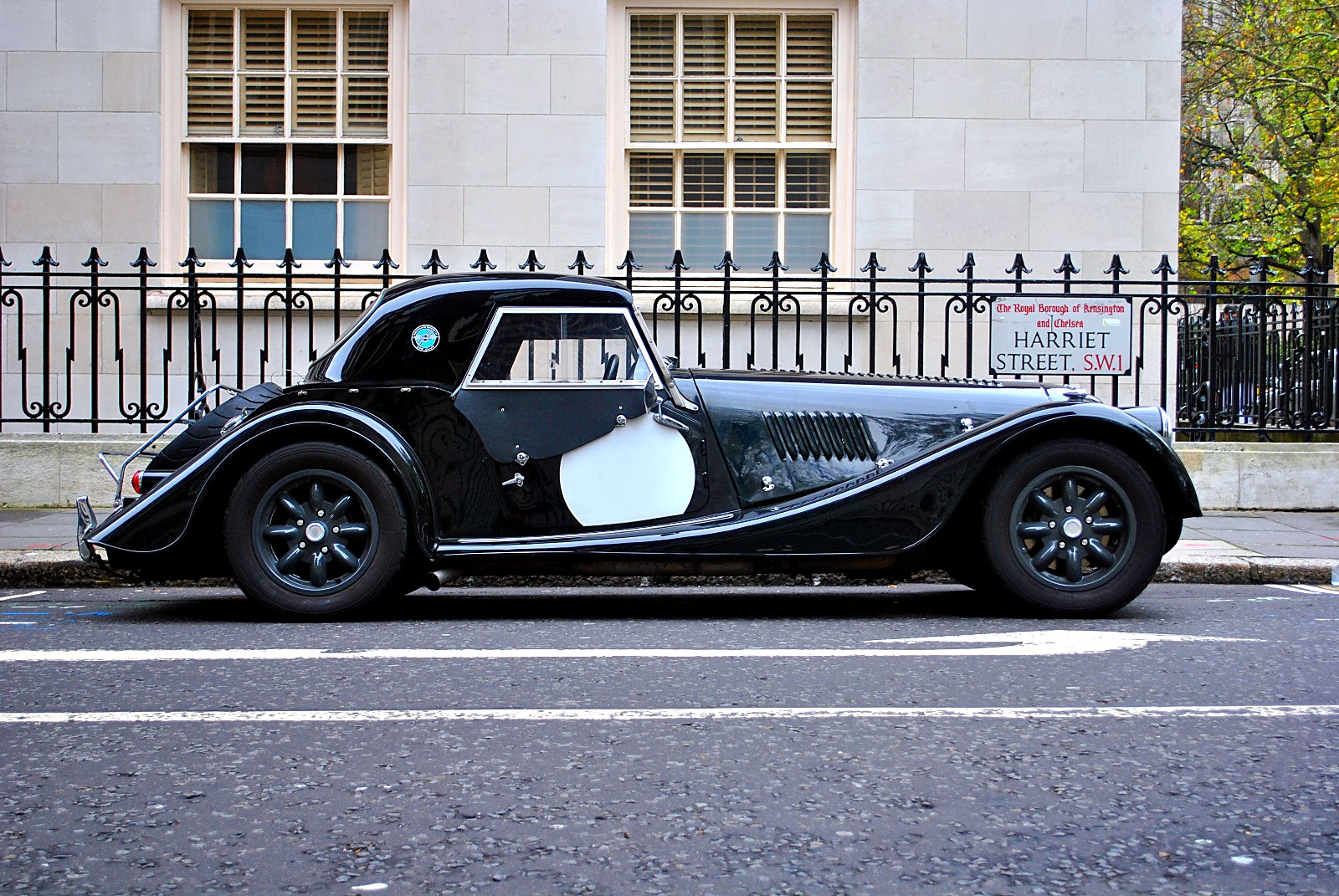
1976 model, with the uncommon hardtop and aftermarket Minilite wheels

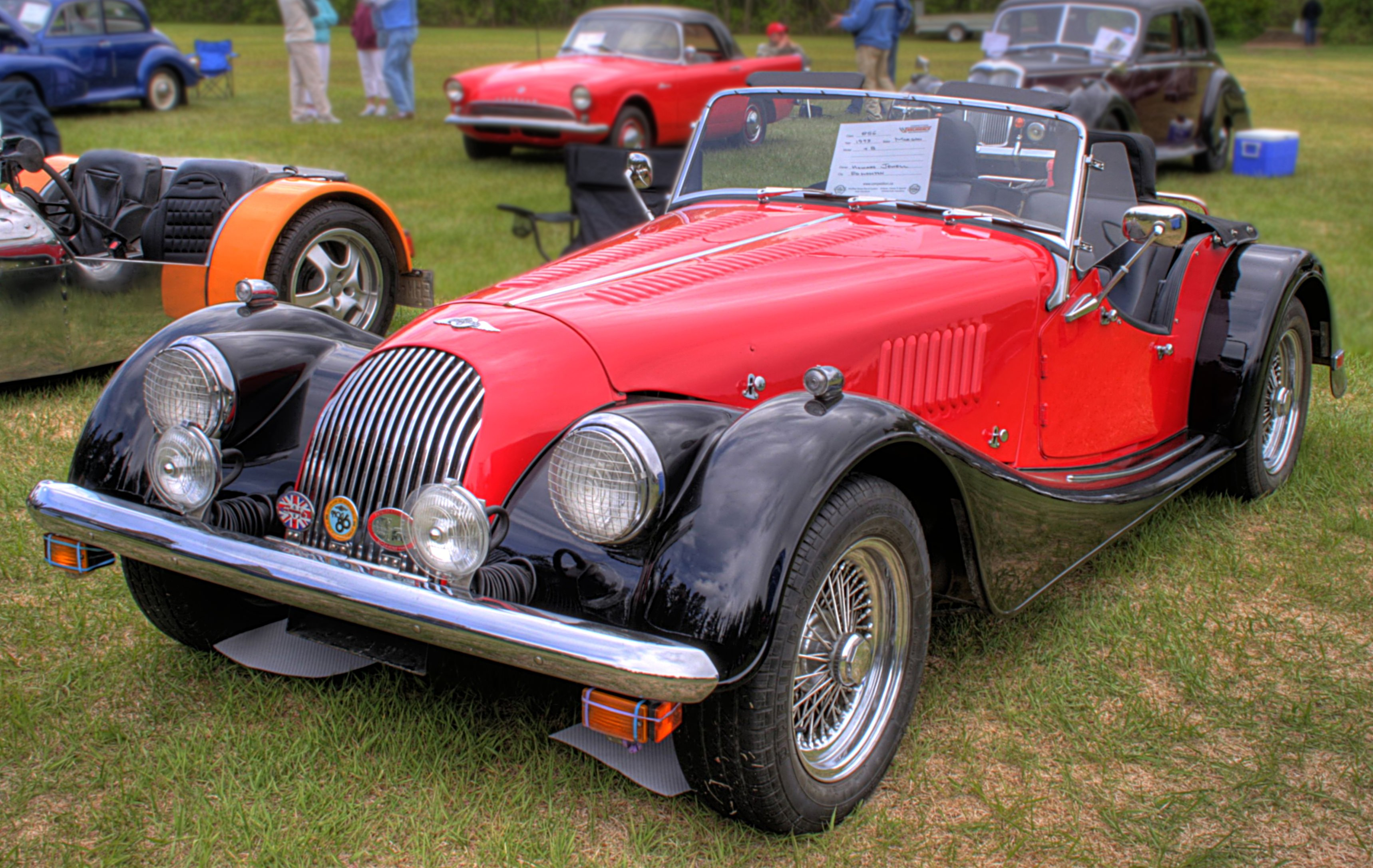
1993 model

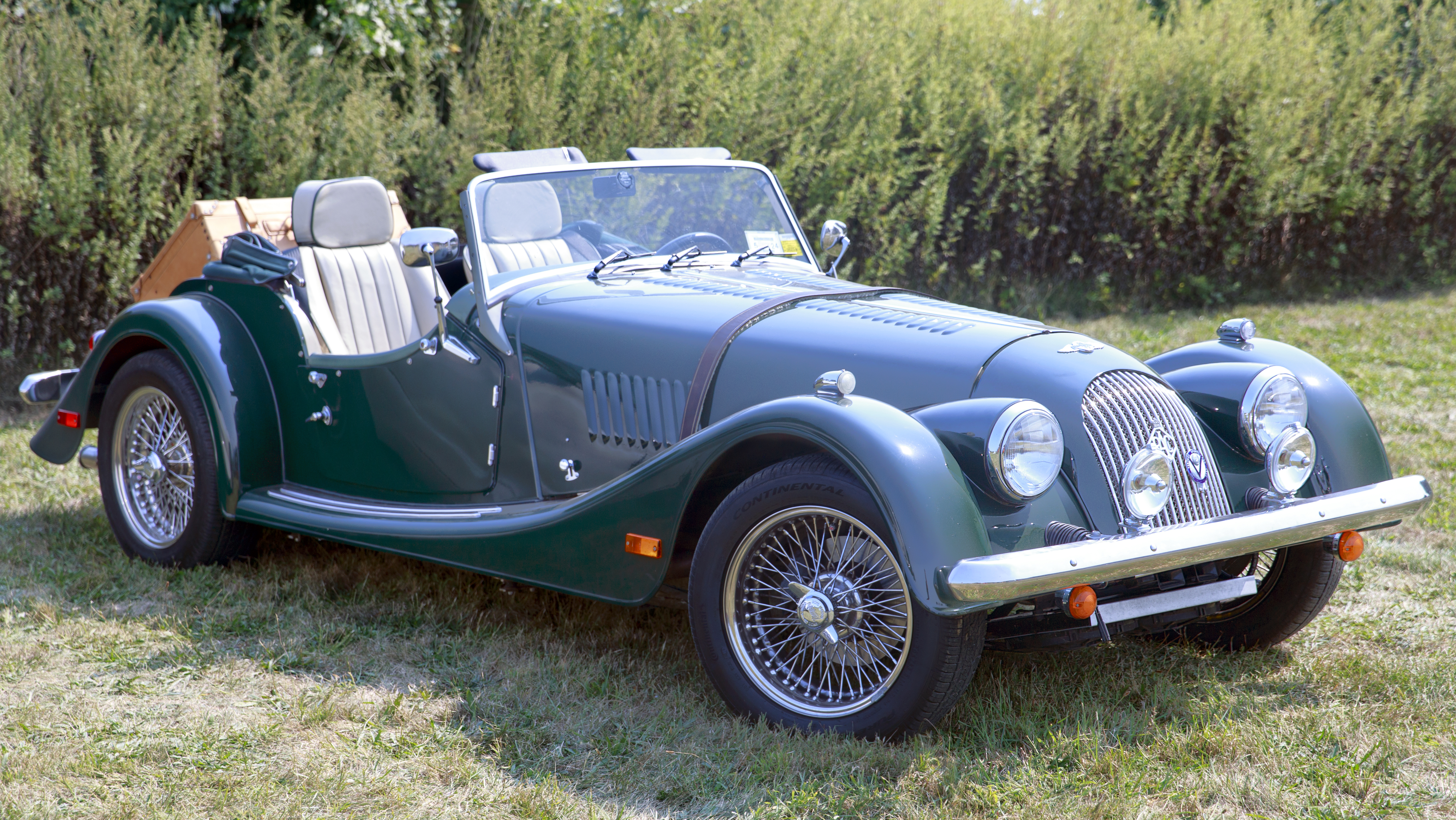
2003 35th Anniversary model (US market)

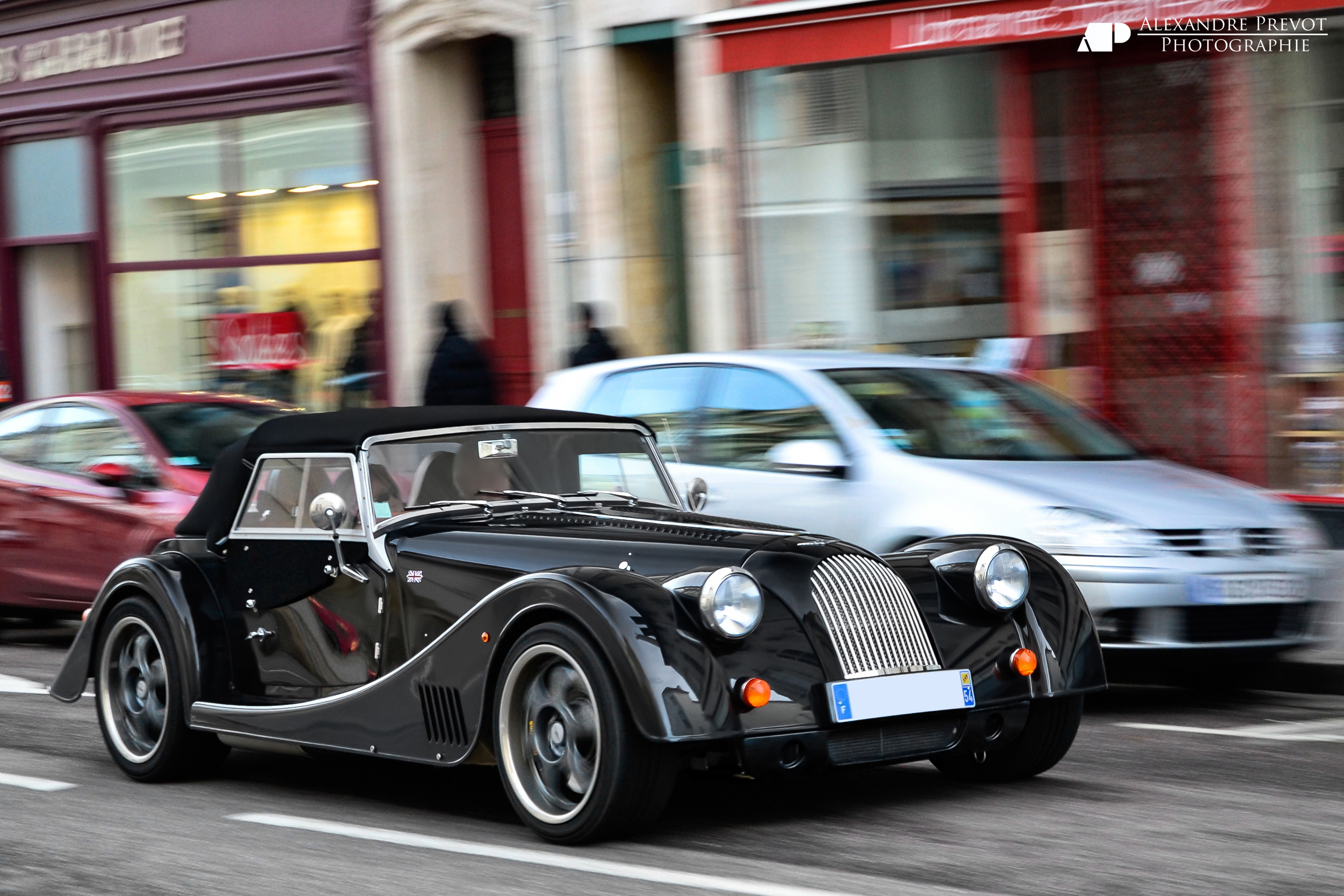
2012–2013 model

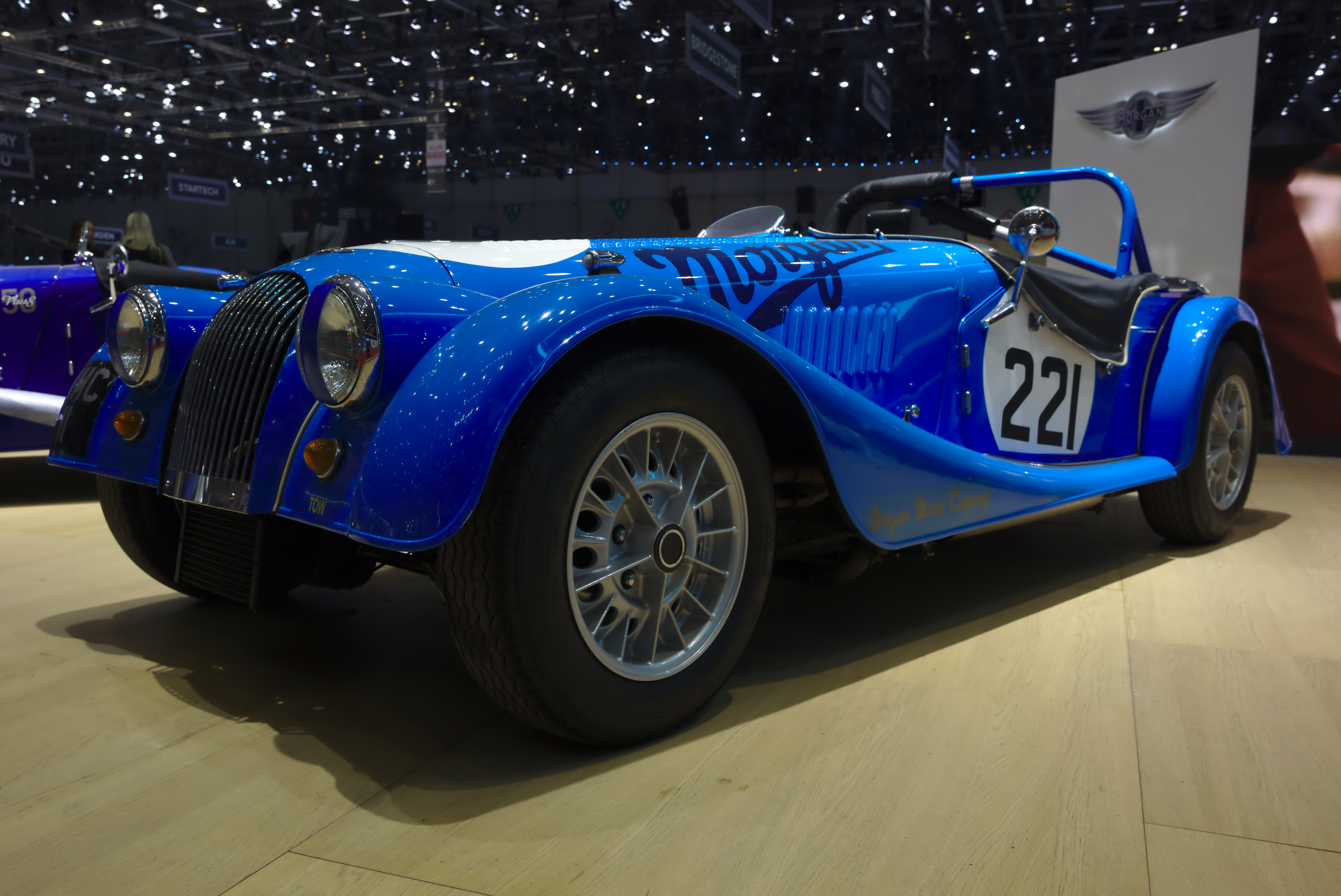
50th Anniversary Edition MMC 11" at the Geneva Motorshow 2018
