= Morgan +4 =

Morgan Plus 4
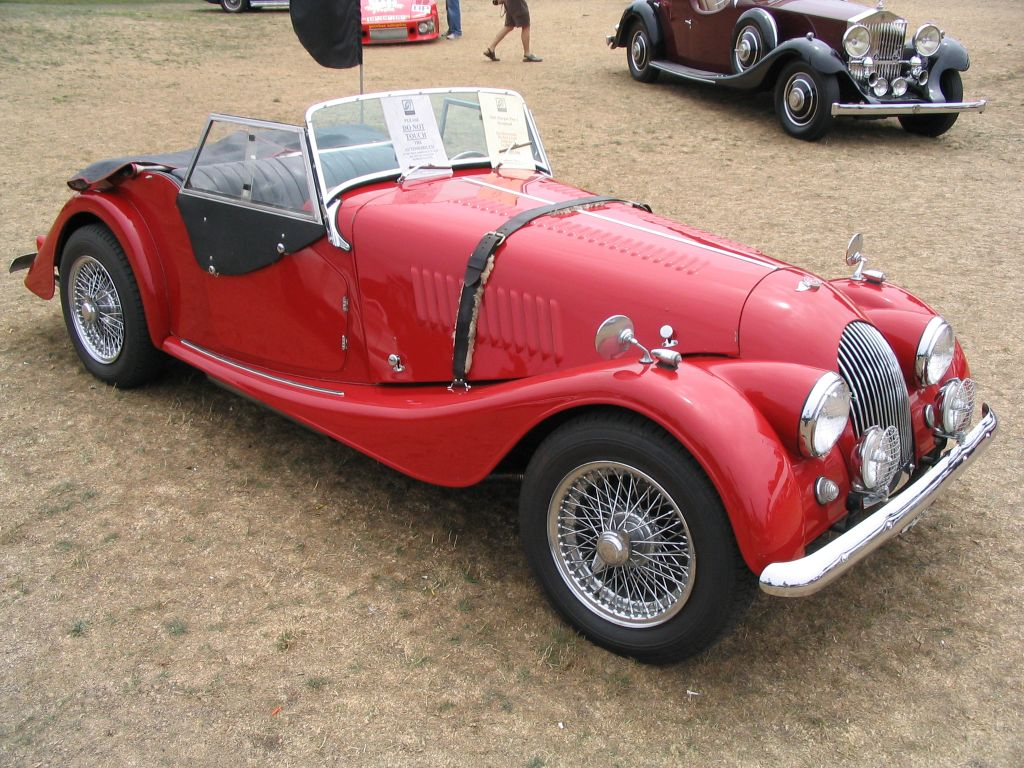
- 1963 Morgan Plus 4

Overview
- Manufacturer: Morgan Motor Company
- Production: 1950–1969; 4,584 produced 1985–2000; 2005–2020
- Assembly: Malvern, Worcestershire, England, United Kingdom

Body and chassis
- Class: Sports car
- Body style: 2-door convertible
- Layout: Front mid-engine, rear-wheel drive
- Related: Morgan 4/4; Morgan Plus 8

Powertrain
- Engine: 1991 cc Triumph OHV I4; 1994 cc Rover M16i DOHC I4; 1994 cc Rover T16 DOHC I4; 1995 cc Fiat DOHC I4; 1999 cc Ford Duratec 20 DOHC I4; 2088 cc Standard OHV I4; 2138 cc Triumph OHV I4

Dimensions
- Wheelbase: 96 in (2,438 mm)
- Length: 145 in (3,683 mm)
- Width: 56 in (1,422 mm)
- Height: 52 in (1,321 mm)
- Curb weight: 1,848 lb (838 kg); 1,848 lb (838 kg) (Super Sports)

Chronology
- Successor: Morgan Plus Four

The Morgan Plus 4 is a sports car produced by the Morgan Motor Company. It is a more powerful and, in the case of the earlier cars, a slightly longer version of the company's previous 4/4 model. Plus 4 production ran from 1950 to 1969. It was revived in 1985 and filled the gap between the 4/4 and the Plus 8 until 2000. It was again produced from 2005 until it was replaced in 2020 by the "all new" Plus Four built on a bonded aluminium platform.

== History ==
=== First series ===
After World War II Morgan re-introduced their 4/4 model fitted with a 1267 cc Standard engine. This continued in production until it was replaced by the larger Plus 4 announced at the 1950 Earl's Court Motor Show. The Plus 4 at its introduction was fitted with a 2088 cc Standard Vanguard engine installed on a widened and strengthened 4/4 chassis with a wheelbase lengthened by 4 in (102 mm). Hydraulic brakes, initially all drum, were fitted for the first time on a Morgan.

In 1953 a higher performance version was announced with the 1991 cc, 90 bhp (67 kW) straight-four engine as used in the Triumph TR2 (a development of the Vanguard motor). The 68 bhp (51 kW) Vanguard engine continued to be available until late in 1956. Beginning in very late 1953, the radiator grille was now surrounded by a cowl that blended into the bonnet; initial cars received an interim version which only curved backwards at the top (nineteen examples were built of this design), followed by a transition version using the final cowled design which also curves backwards at the sides coupled with lower-mounted headlamps. The final design, with higher mounted headlight pods and the badge above the grille appeared sometime in 1954; flat radiator cars were frequently returned to the factory to have the front updated, along with various technical upgrades. Front disc brakes became an option in 1959 and were standardised in 1960. From 1956 the 1991 cc 100 bhp (75 kW), Triumph TR3 engine was used and from 1962 the engine was the Triumph TR4 unit, which increased displacement to 2138 cc. The bonnet of the Triumph-engined Plus 4 fitted so closely to the engine that there was no room for an air filter.

In 1955 the less powerful 4/4 model re-appeared in phase II form. The 96 in (2,438 mm) wheelbase of the Plus 4 was adopted by the 4/4 when it reappeared, after which the two models were for most purposes the same length and width.

Body styles available were a 2-seat sports, 4-seat sports, and more luxurious drophead coupé (DHC). A 4-seater version of the drophead coupé was available in 1954–1956 only; due to the complexity of the build, Morgan lost money on every one of these cars (which can be recognized by having a regular boot with a lid) and the type was discontinued after 51 examples had left the factory gates. In total, 556 examples of the various drophead coupés were built between 1950 and January 1969; 117 of them were early, flatnose designs. In 1963 a fibreglass bodied coupé called Morgan +4+ was announced, but only 26 were built. Production of the Plus 4 ended in 1969, after supplies of the Triumph engine had dried up.

A TR3 engined two seater car was tested by the British magazine The Motor in 1958. It was found to have had a top speed of 100.3 mph (161.4 km/h) and could accelerate from 0-60 mph (97 km/h) in 9.7 seconds. A fuel consumption of 27.1 miles per imperial gallon (10.4 L/100 km; 22.6 mpg_{‑US}) was recorded. The test car cost £1017 including taxes of £340.

Following the success of the LawrenceTune modified example at Le Mans in 1962 a higher performance version, the Plus 4 Super Sports, was available from 1962 with a tuned engine and a "low-line" lightweight, aluminium body. Just over 100 were built. The then Swiss Morgan Importer, Rolf Wehrlin in Aesch/BL, developed a coupé version of the Morgan +4. To make up for the extra weight of the body, the engine was fitted with a Judson supercharger.

=== Second series ===
In 1985, the +4 name was brought back on a version equipped with the 2-litre version of Fiat's Twin Cam engine, coupled to the gearbox and clutch from the Plus 8. This model was only built until 1988, when it was replaced by Rover's M16i unit and matching five-speed manual transmission. Still of two litres, power increased from 122 to 138 hp (91 to 103 kW). For export markets, a catalyzed version with 131 hp (98 kW) was also on offer. In 1992, the +4 switched to using the wider chassis of the Plus 8, providing an additional 4 inches (10 cm) of width in the cabin. At the same time, the M16 was replaced by the updated T16 engine. This specification remained until Plus Four production was again halted in 2000. The second series of the +4 underwent 114 design changes, including galvanising the steel chassis from 1995, while the steel wings were changed for superformed aluminium units in 1998. While some changes were necessary to gain European Type Approval, others were dictated by customers, such as the addition of a long-door variant in 1997.

=== Third series ===
In late 2004, the +4 returned, now powered by the Ford (Mazda) Duratec engine - again of two litres displacement. Power was 145 hp (108 kW) at the time of introduction; later this was increased to 154 hp (115 kW). Production ended in 2020 in favour of the new CX-series Morgan Plus Four.

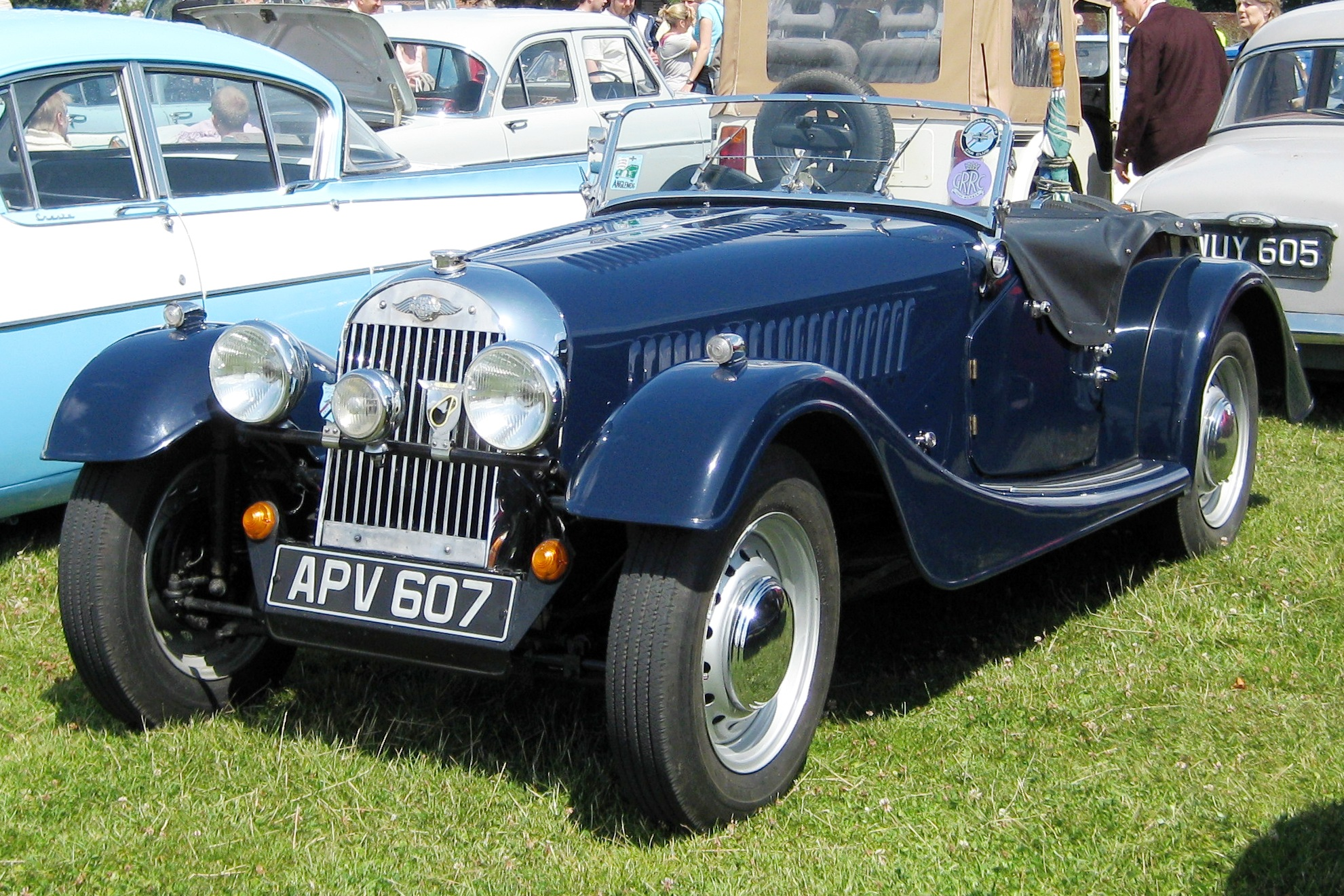
1951 Morgan Plus 4 (flat radiator)

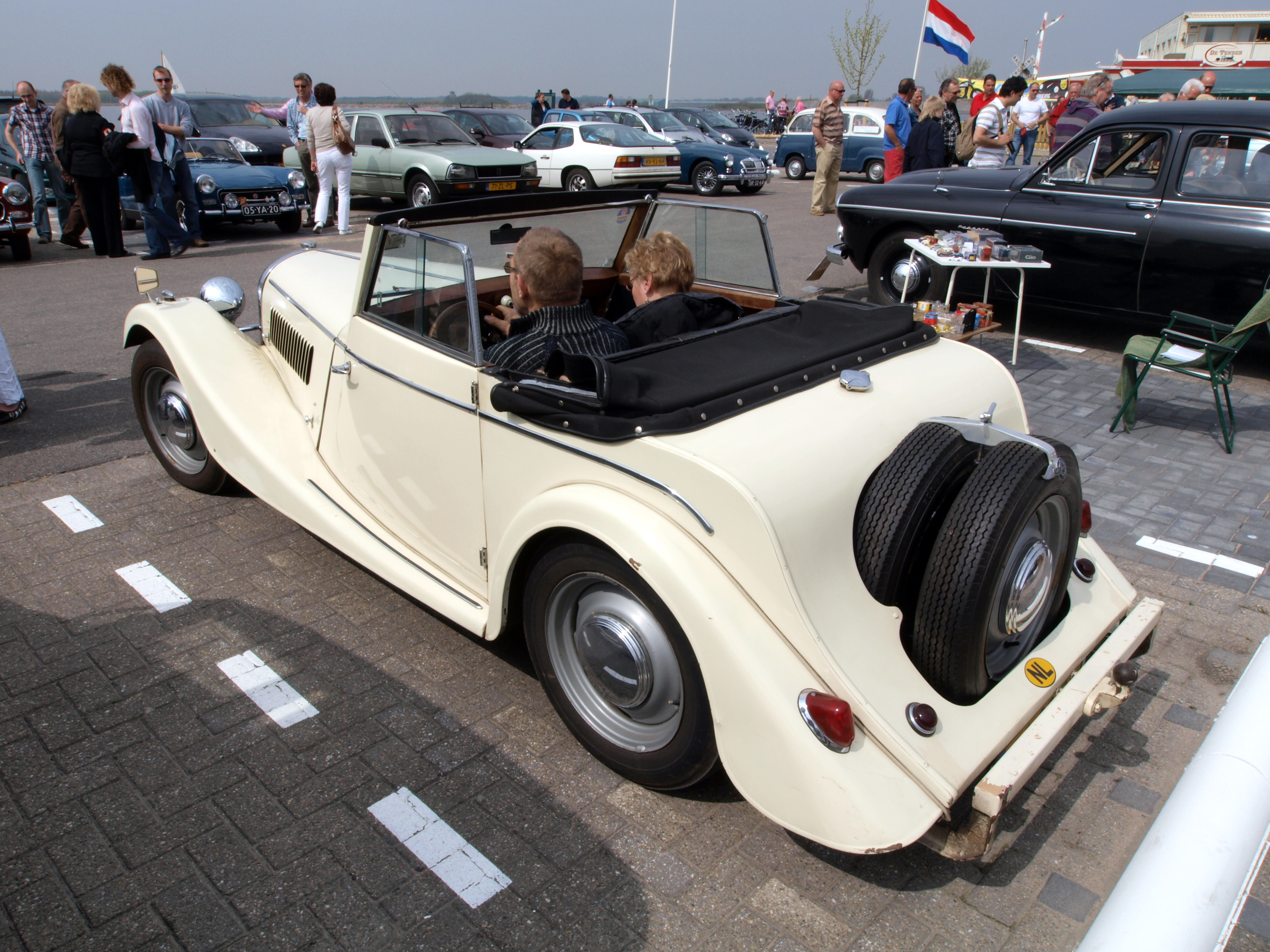
1952 Morgan +4 2-seater Drophead Coupé - early DHCs have twin spares at the rear

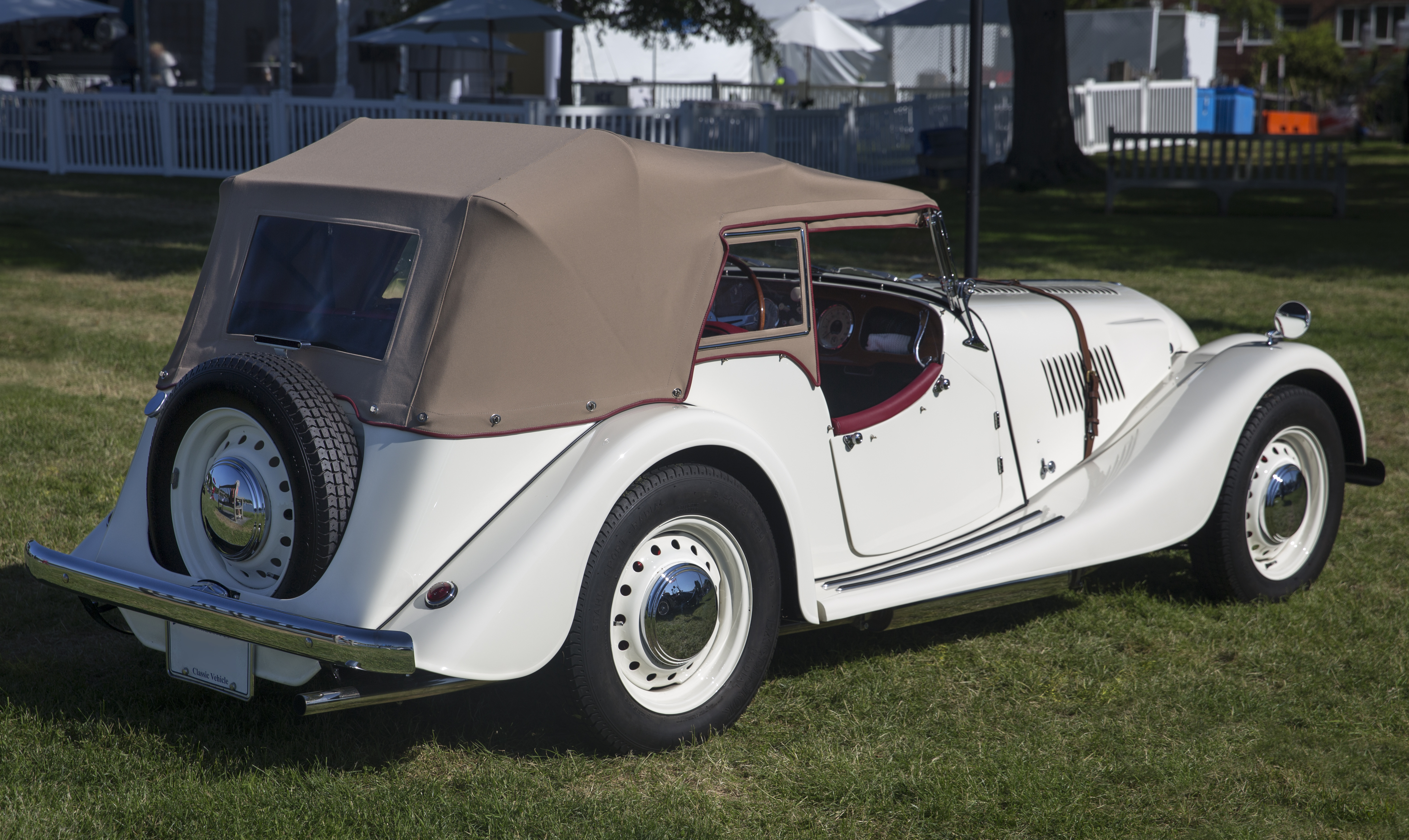
1957 Morgan +4 4-Seater

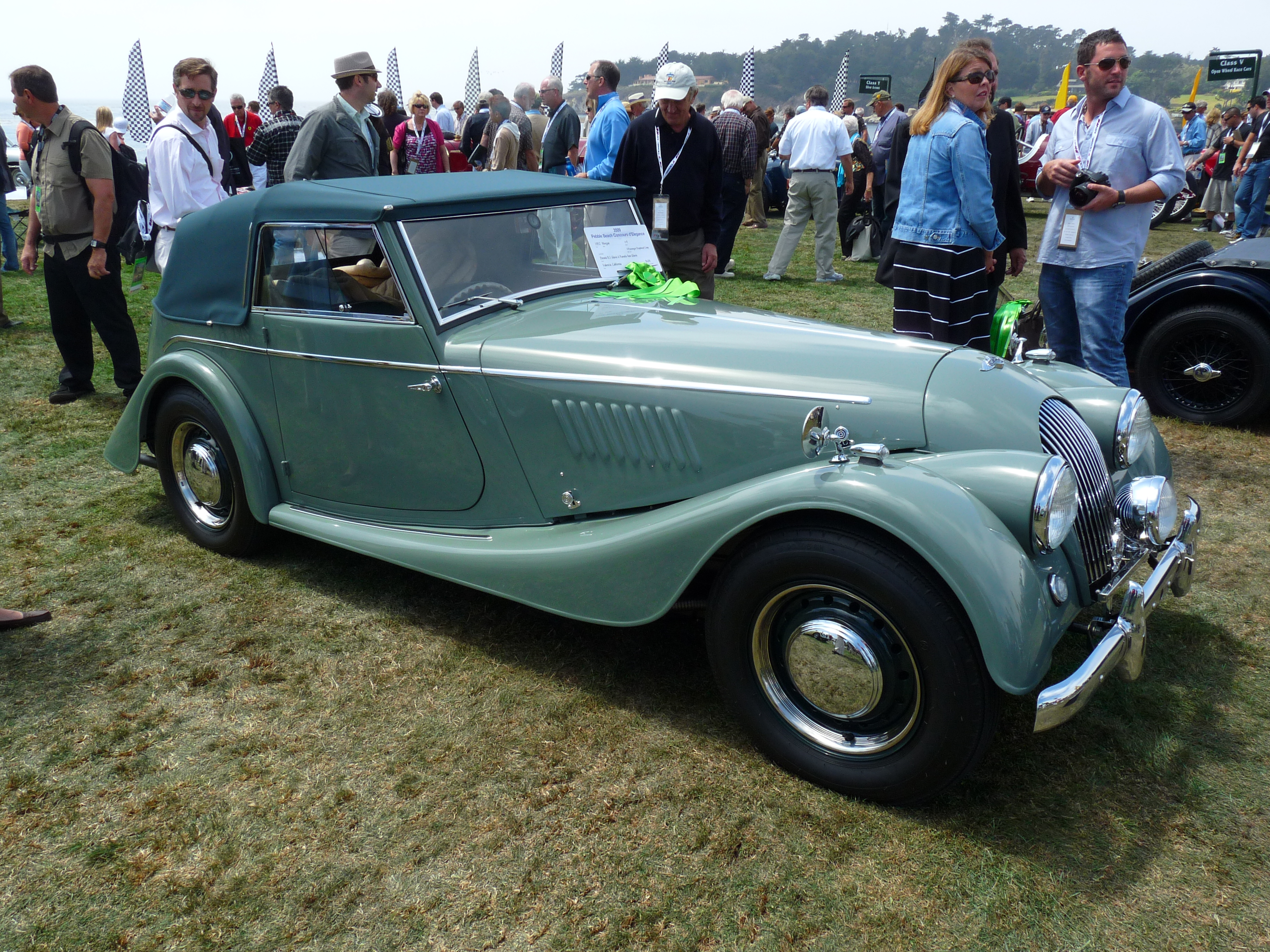
1953 Morgan +4 4-passenger Drophead Coupé - this is the initial prototype from 1953, although it was retrofitted with the new rounded cowl in 1954

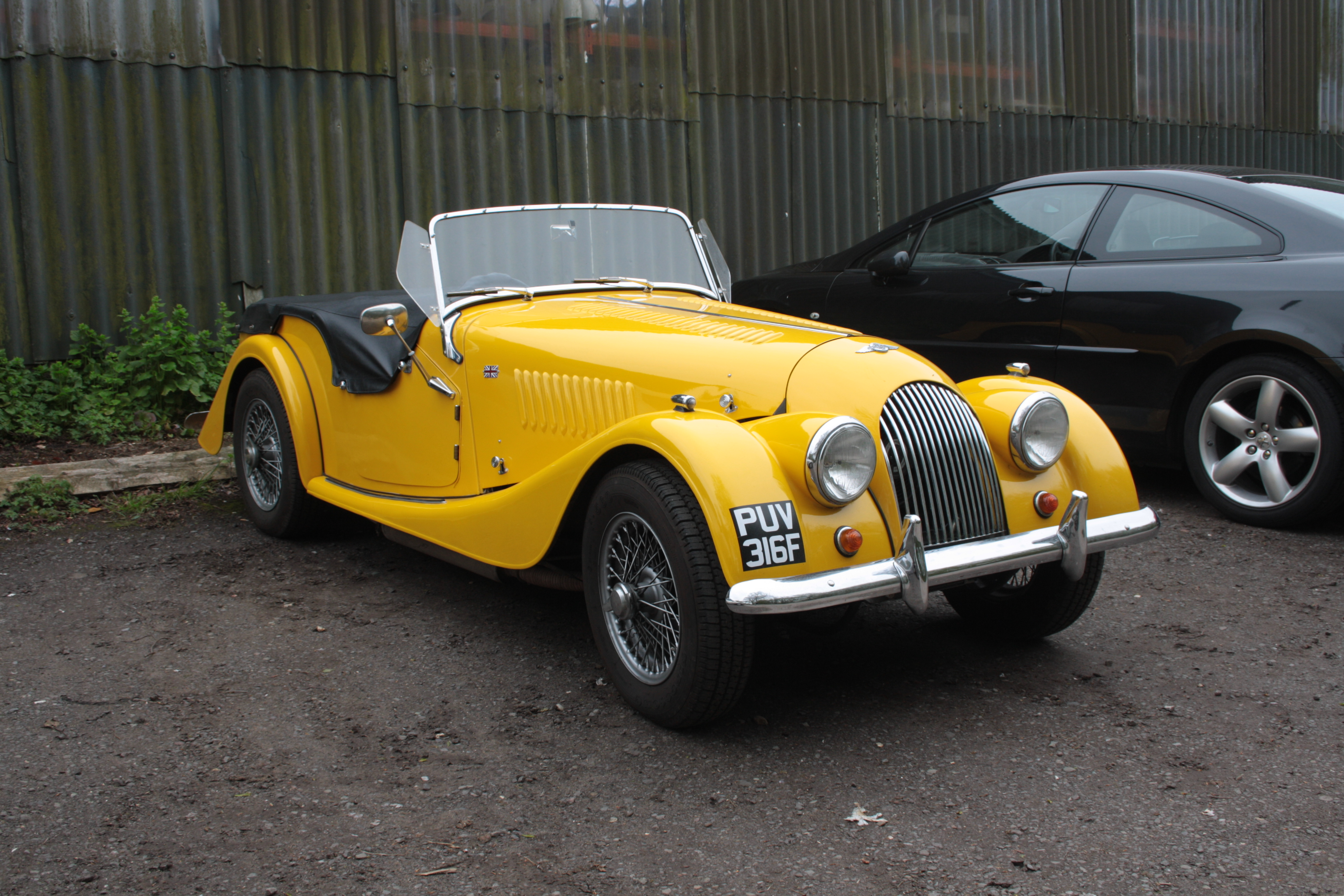
1967 Morgan Car +4 (UK)

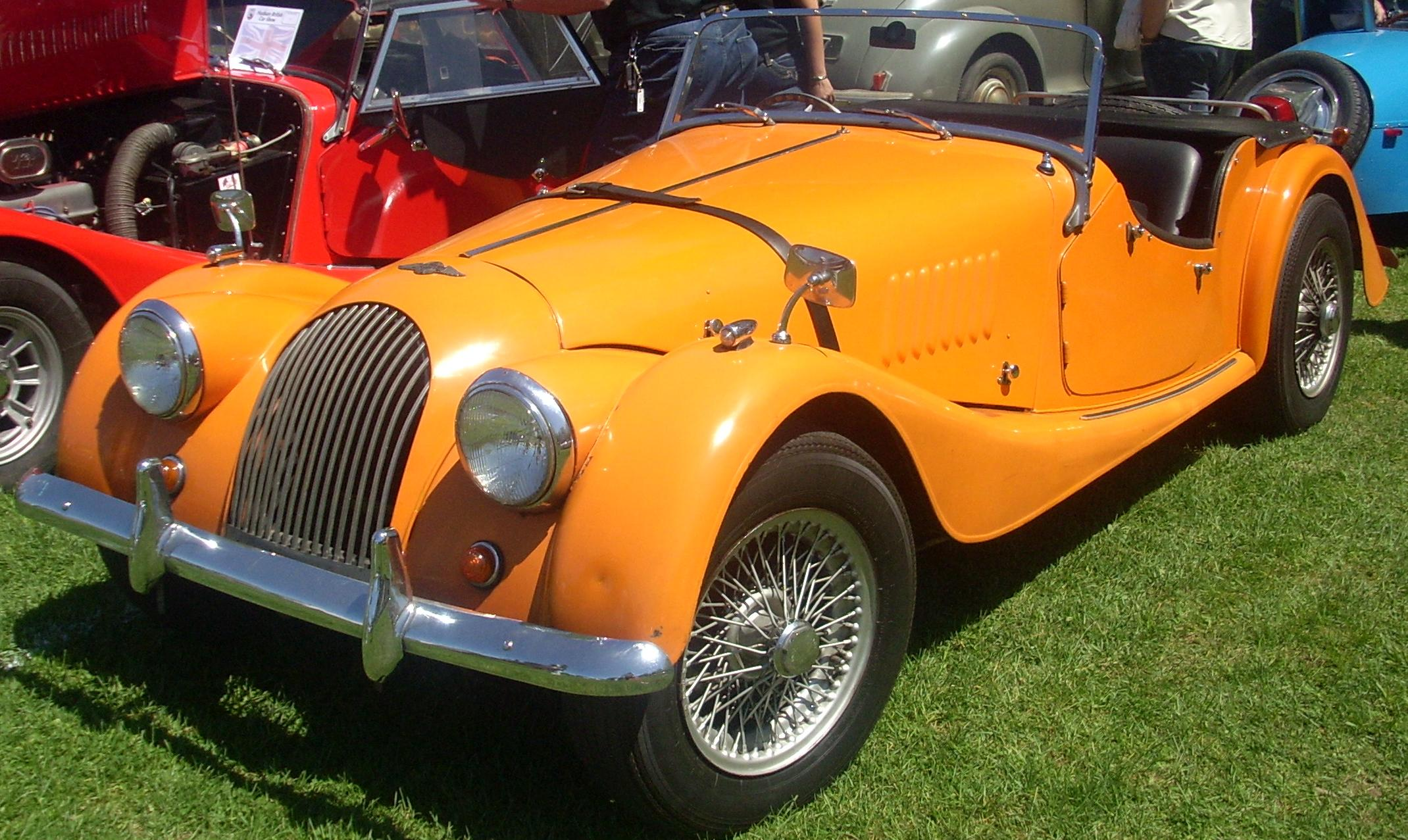
1970 Morgan +4 (North America)

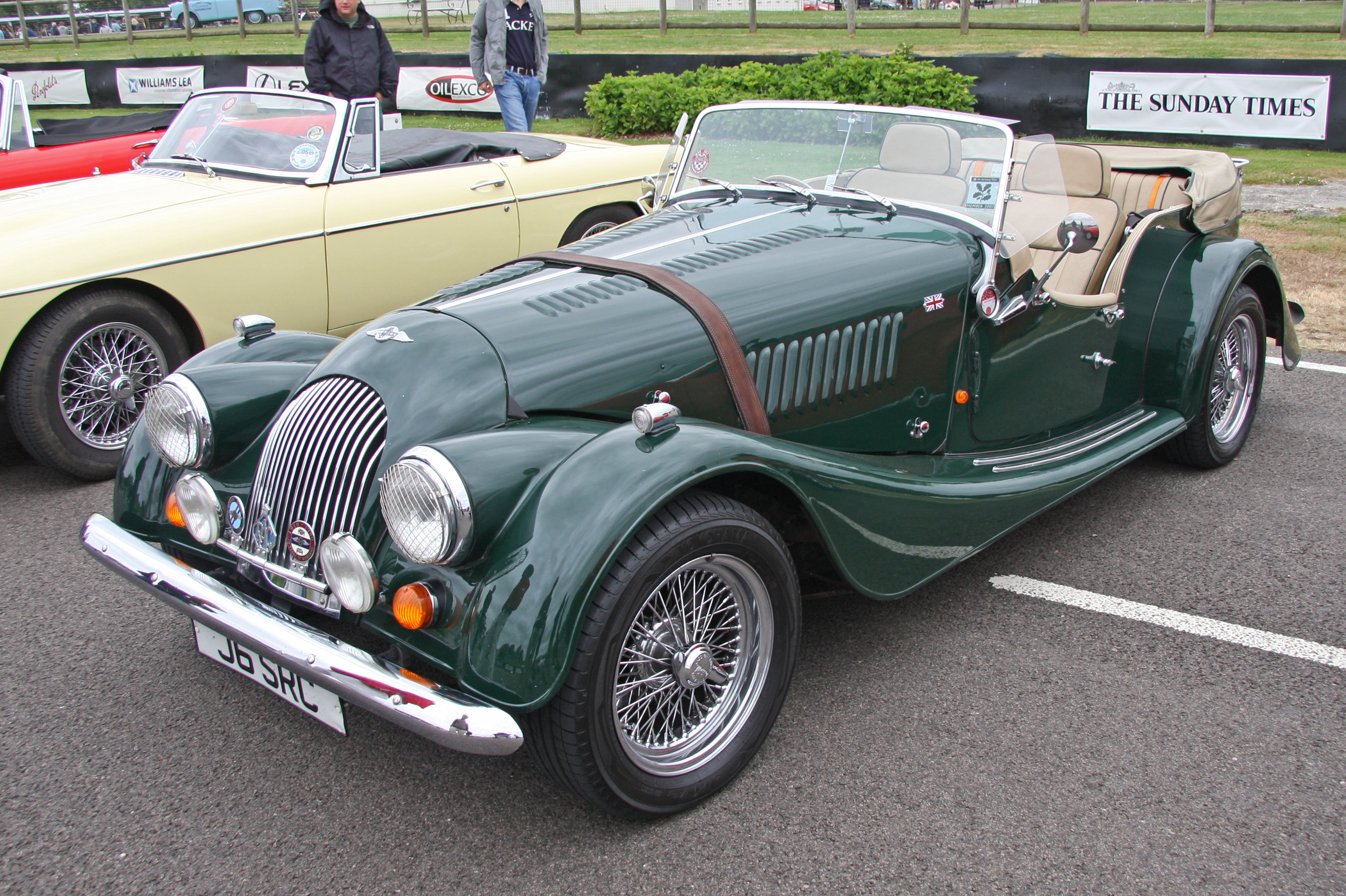
1993 Morgan Plus 4 Four Seater

== Competition use ==
Four-wheel Morgan cars have been used in competition since HFS Morgan drove the prototype 4-4 in the MCC Exeter Trial in December 1935. Plus 4 highlights include:

Chris Lawrence and Richard Shepherd-Barron won the 1601-2000cc GT class at the 1962 24 Hours of Le Mans driving a Plus Four. The class winning car, chassis number 4840, was originally registered XRX 1 in 1961, then changed to TOK 258 from late 1961 through mid-1964 (at least different 4 Morgans have carried the TOK 258 registration number). It was sold by Chris Lawrence to A. Dence in 1964 and the registration was changed to JHX 142B.

In 1964 Chris Lawrence and John Sprinzel (Sprinzel LawrenceTune Racing; SLR) developed a streamlined aluminum coupé body for racing. The first SLR was fitted to a Triumph TR4 chassis, but the final three were fitted to Morgan +4s.

From February 1966 to November 1966 Morgan produced the two-seater +4 Competition model, of which only 42 were built. It is estimated that only approximately 11 of these still exist today. The Morgan +4 Competition model was approximately 10% more expensive than the standard +4. The Competition model had a low-line steel body, similar to the Morgan "Super Sports" aluminum body, and generally came with a Derrington four branch exhaust manifold, Derrington competition steering wheel, 72-spoke wire wheels, Armstrong select-a-ride electrically adjustable rear shock absorbers, and the 2.2-litre twin SU carburetor TR4 engine.

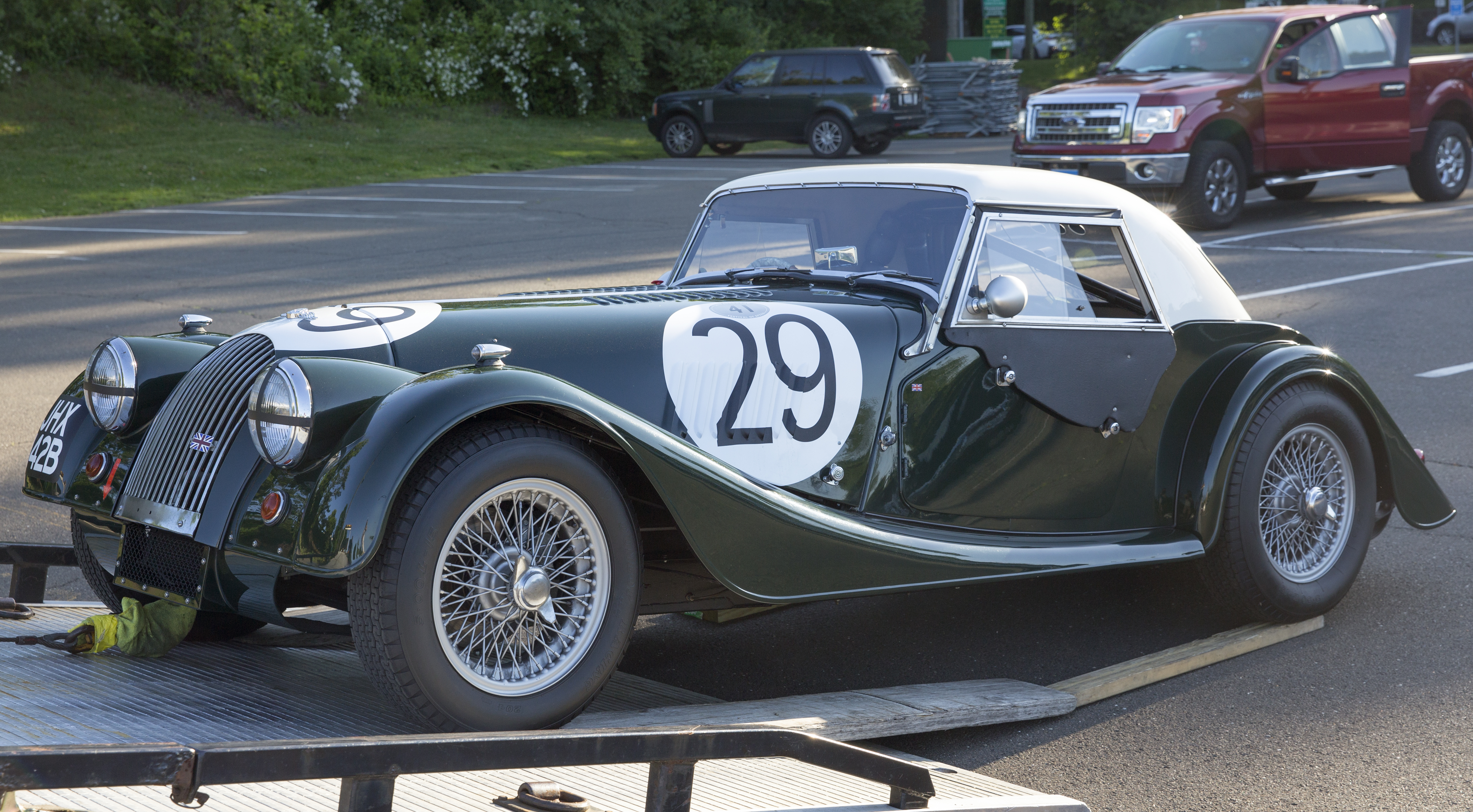
The 1962 Le Mans class-winning Morgan +4

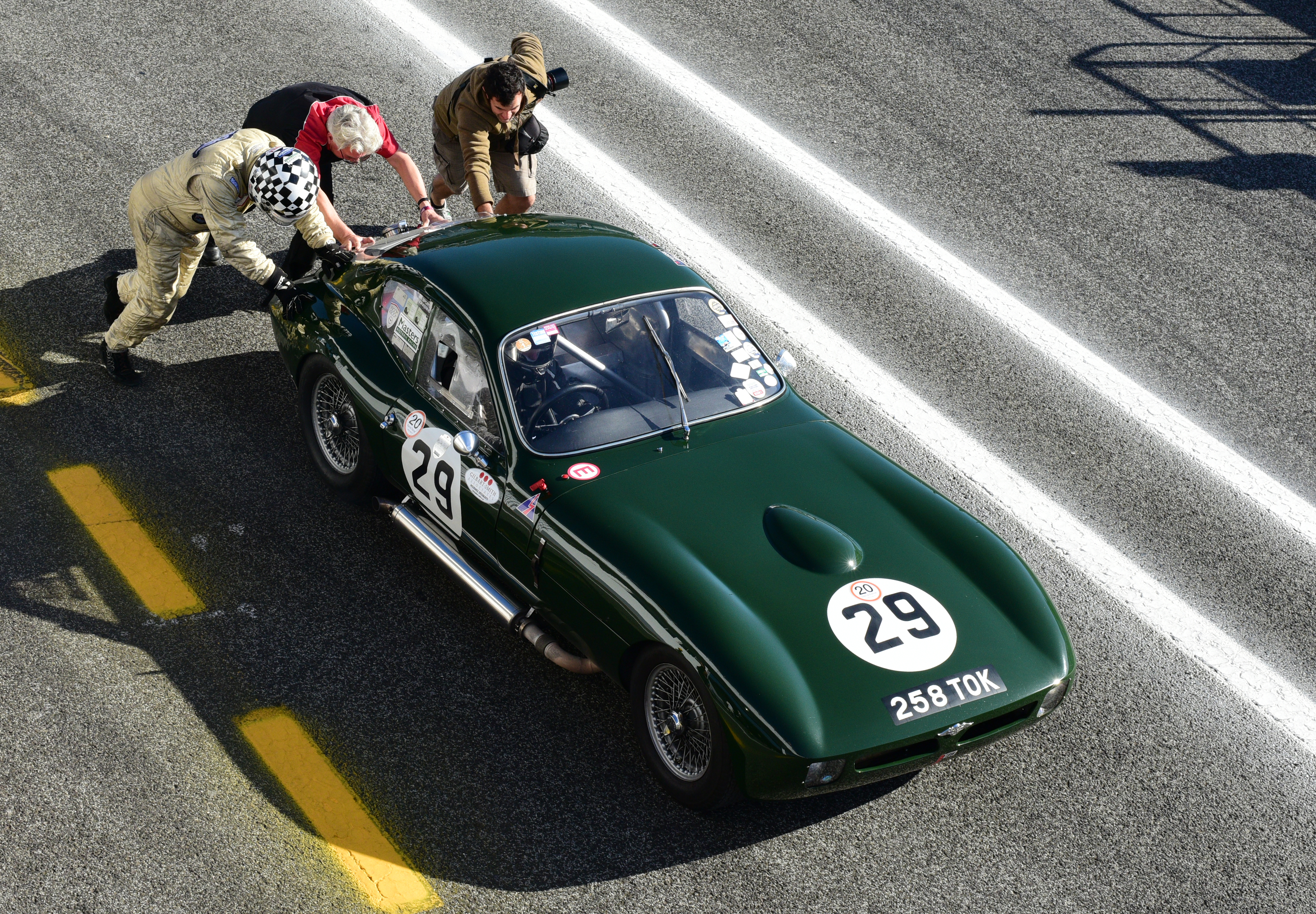
The streamlined Morgan +4 SLR

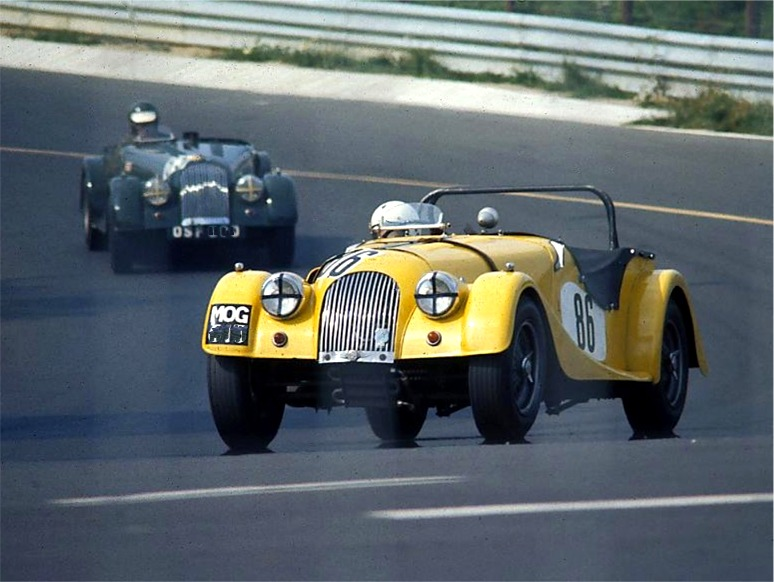
Two Plus Fours being raced at the 1976 Oldtimer-GP at Nürburgring; the Plus Four has been popular in vintage racing since its inception

== Appearances in popular culture ==
In the film The War of the Roses, Barbara Rose (Kathleen Turner) buys her husband (Michael Douglas) a 1960 +4. After their marriage sours, she destroys the Morgan by crushing it under her GMC Jimmy.

The wealthy heiress and debutante who is the subject of the Frank Zappa song "Florentine Pogen" drives "a '59 Morgan."

In Agatha Christie's Marple (TV show: season 2, Ep. 3) a red Morgan +4 is driven by one of the main characters. Of the car she says: "My husband gave it to me. I've always wanted one."

== See also ==
Morgan +4+
