= Morgan Plus Four =

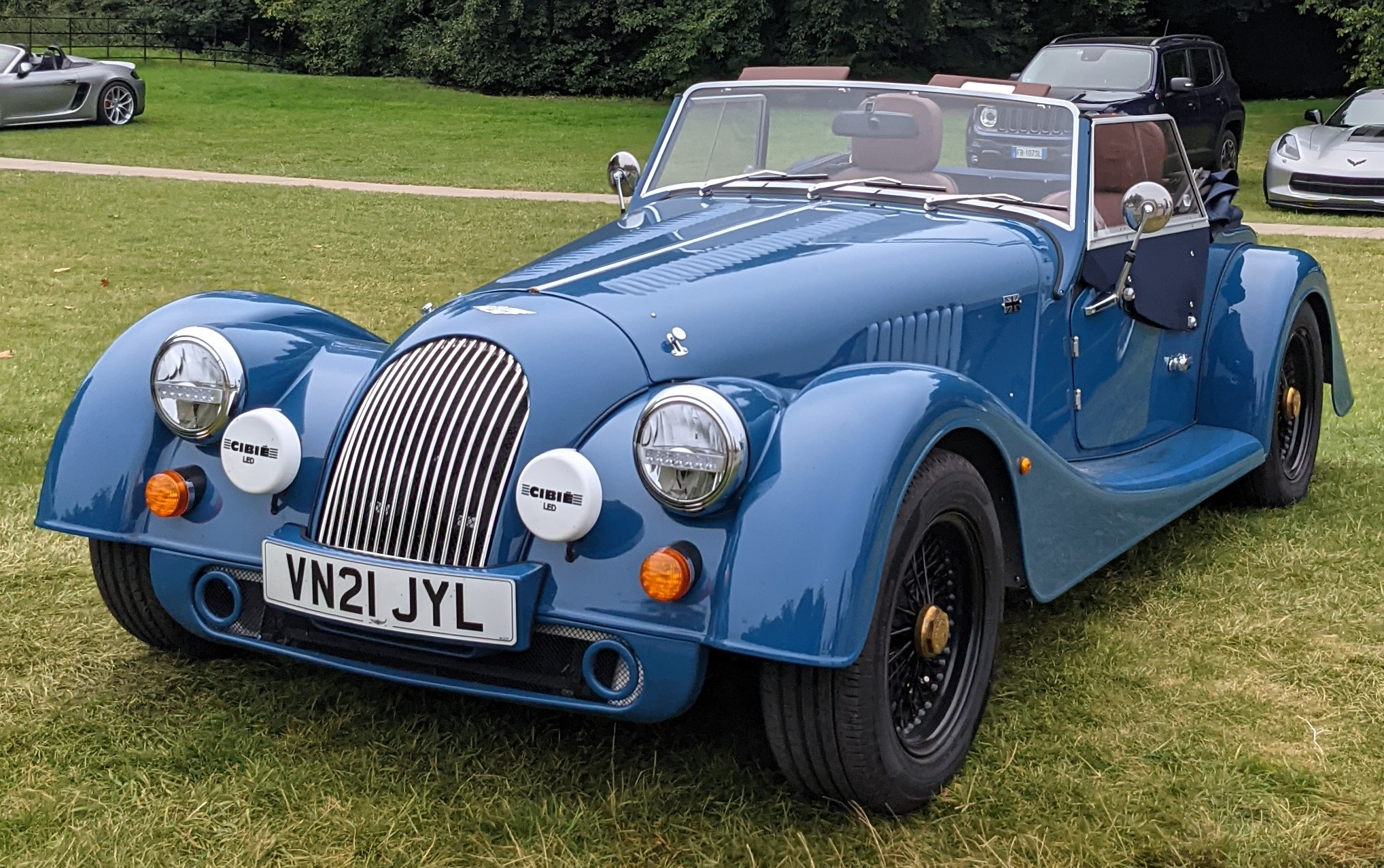

Overview
- Manufacturer: Morgan Motor Company
- Production: 2020–present
- Assembly: United Kingdom: Malvern, Worcestershire, England

Body and chassis
- Class: Sports car (S)
- Body style: Roadster
- Layout: FR layout
- Platform: CX-Generation

Powertrain
- Engine: 2.0L B48 turbo I4
- Power output: 259 PS (190 kW; 255 hp)
- Transmission: 6-Speed Manual; 8-Speed ZF 8HP Automatic

Dimensions
- Length: 3,830 mm (150.79 in)
- Width: 1,650 mm (64.96 in)
- Height: 1,250 mm (49.21 in)
- Kerb weight: 1,009 kg (2,224.46 lb) (Automatic); 1,013 kg (2,233.28 lb) (Manual)

Chronology
- Predecessor: Morgan +4

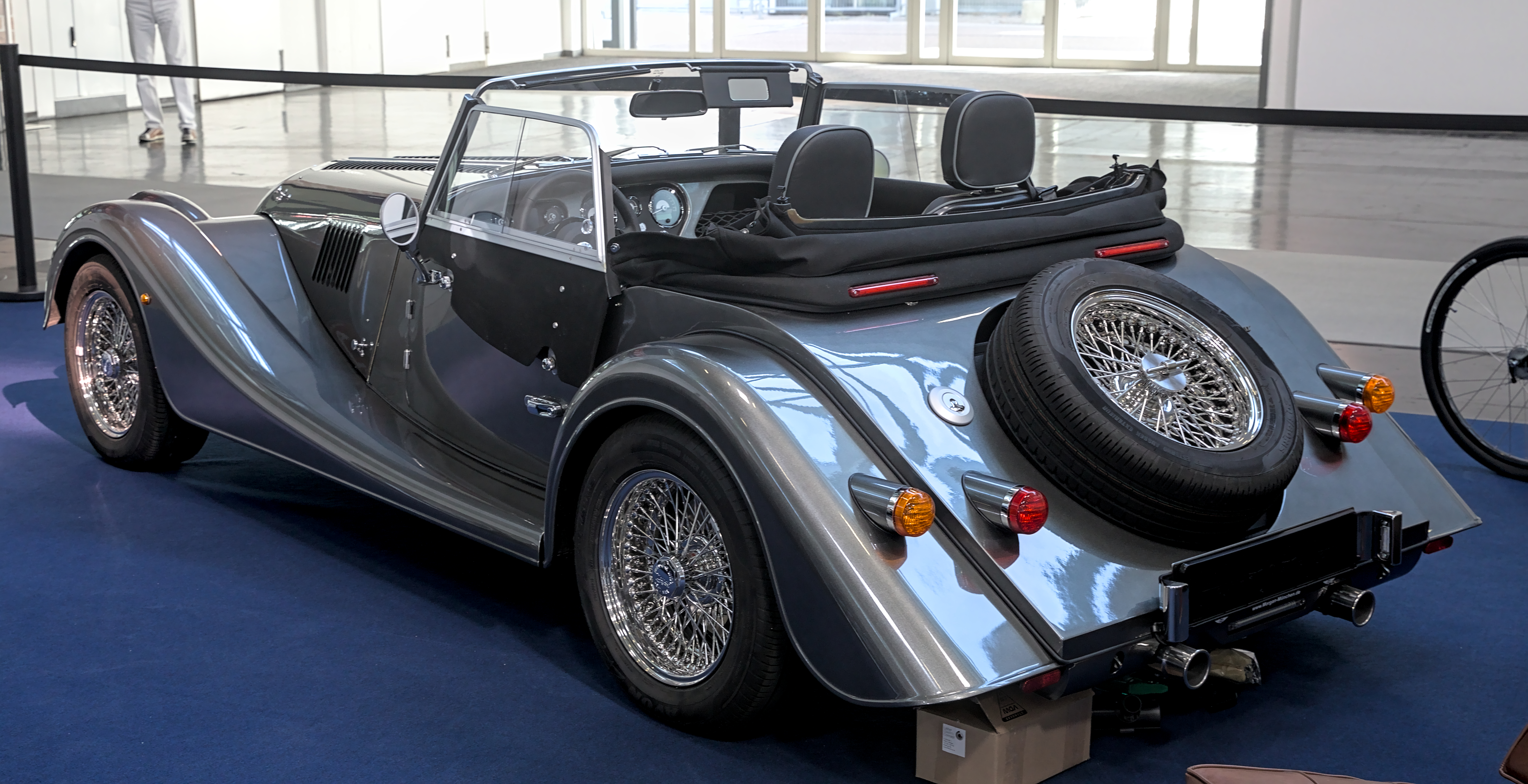
Rear view

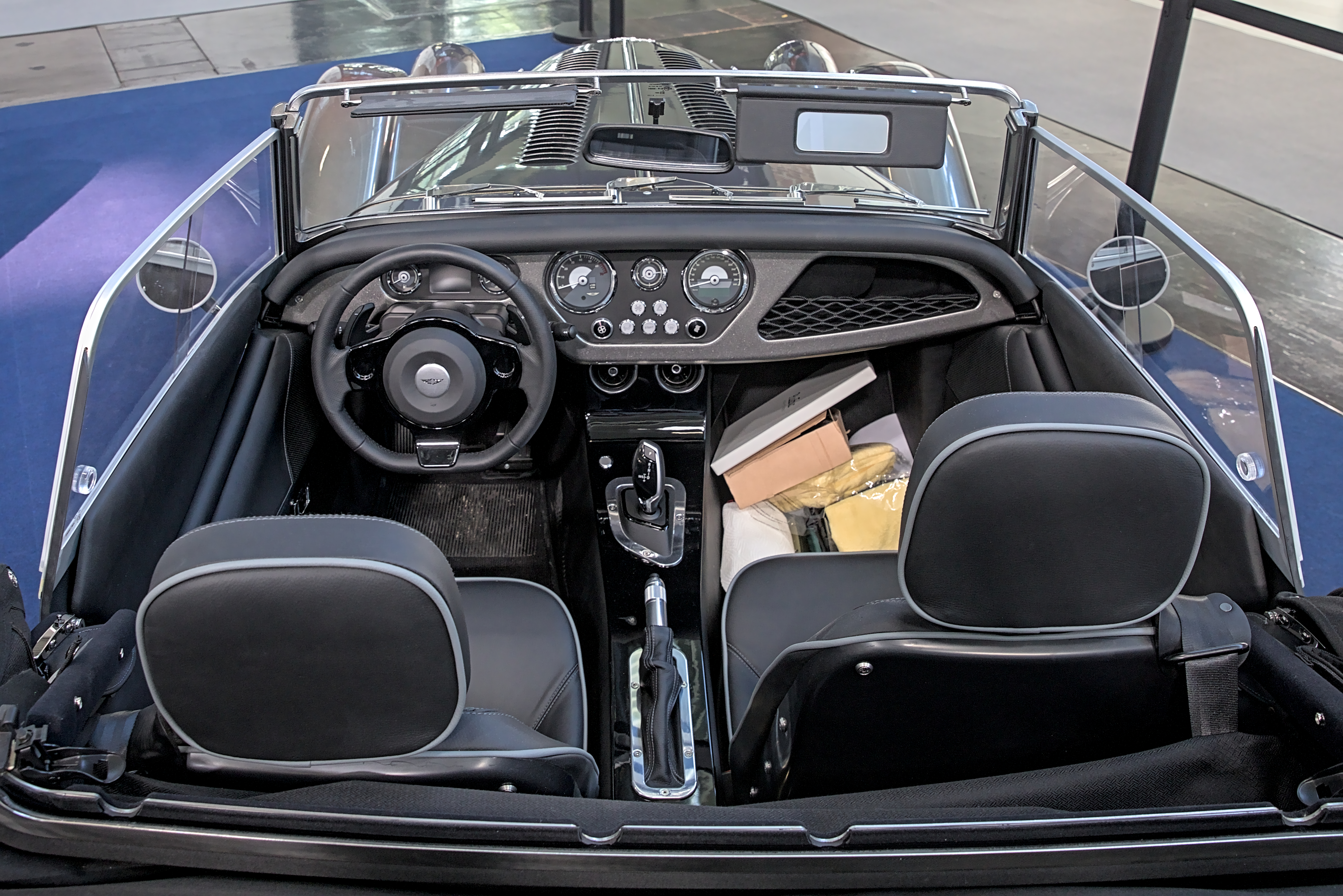
Interior

The Morgan Plus Four is a roadster produced by the British car manufacturer Morgan from 2020. The Plus Four replaces the Morgan +4, which was produced intermittently between 1950 and 2020.

== Introduction ==
The Plus Four was to be presented at the Geneva Motor Show in March 2020, but its appearance was cancelled due to the COVID-19 pandemic; it was revealed online on 3 March 2020.

== Specifications ==
The Plus Four is the second model, after the Plus Six, to be developed on Morgan's new bonded aluminium "CX-Generation" platform but, like its predecessor, it is assembled with an ash timber frame. It is powered by an original 1,998 cc (2.0 L; 121.9 cu in) BMW TwinPower petrol engine producing 259 PS (190 kW; 255 hp) and 350 N⋅m (258 lb⋅ft) of torque when combined with the 6-speed manual transmission and 400 N⋅m (295 lb⋅ft) of torque with the 8-speed automatic transmission.

== United States sales ==
Morgan announced that after the Plus Four would be sold at the company's twelve United States dealerships for the 2025 model year. Under a federal 'replica car' rule via the Fixing America's Surface Transportation Act, sales will be limited to 325 cars per year in order to legally circumvent federal safety rules, although the vehicle would still have to comply with lighting and emissions regulations. Only the automatic transmission will be available for US buyers, as the manual will require a different calibration to meet California Air Resources Board emission standards. The Plus Four will not be available in Canada due to homologation rules.
