= Morgan +4+ =

Morgan Plus 4 Plus
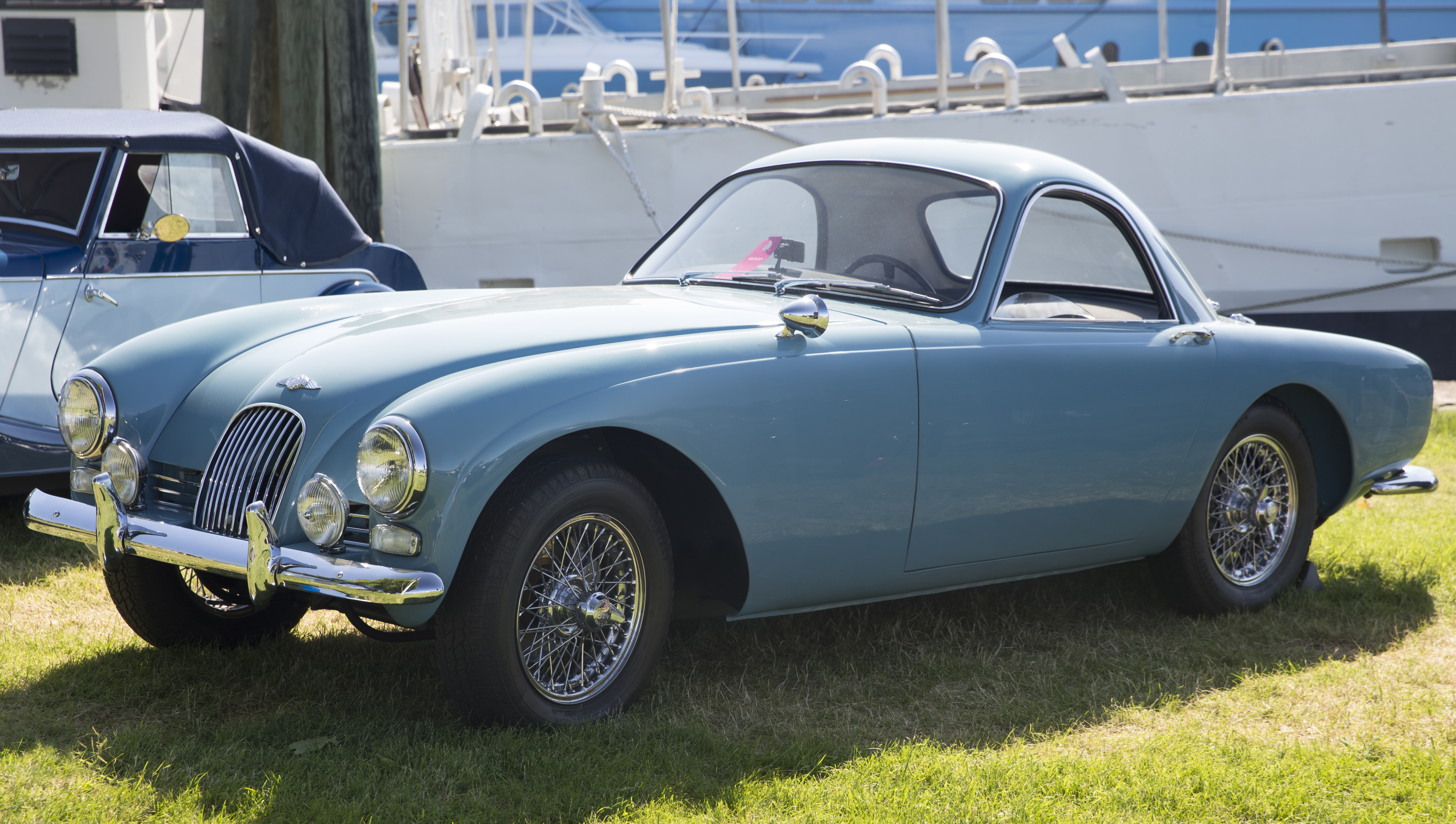

Overview
- Manufacturer: Morgan Motor Company
- Production: 1964-1967; 26 produced

Body and chassis
- Class: front-engined Sports car
- Body style: 2-door coupé

Powertrain
- Engine: 2138 cc Triumph TR4AI4

Dimensions
- Wheelbase: 96 in (2,438 mm)
- Length: 149 in (3,785 mm)
- Width: 63 in (1,600 mm)
- Height: 51 in (1,295 mm)

The Morgan Plus 4 Plus or +4+ was an attempt by the Morgan Motor Company to modernize the bodywork. Announced at the 1963 Earls Court Motor Show, only 26 were built, due to poor sales, in spite of its performance.

The equipment may have varied between cars, but were typically mechanically similar to a Morgan +4 of the same year. It had the straight-four, pushrod engine of a Triumph TR4A, giving 110 hp (82 kW). The transmission was a four-speed with synchromesh on the top three gears. It also shared the suspension with the +4: In front, it had sliding king pins tilted 17 degrees from the vertical, a development of Morgan's original, 1910 design. This was lubricated by grease and by engine oil released by a button under the clutch pedal. It had very firm coil springs and bottoming coils instead of rubber pads. The rear has conventional leaf springs with solid rear axle. There was no perceptible body lean, even when cornering very hard. It had disc brakes in front, drums in the rear, with no power assist. The frame was made up of Z section steel rails with structural plywood floor, extended by steel tubes in front.

The closed envelope two seat body was thin streamlined fibreglass with fixed top and all glass windows, wind-ups on the sides, giving it a weight of 1800 pounds (816 kg) and a top speed of around 115 mph (185 km/h) (compared to 111 mph (179 km/h) for the heavier, less streamlined TR4A). Performance was better than +4, because the fibreglass kept the weight low in spite of more interior space, and the more modern shape had less air drag. Sound insulation was limited, but leg room was unusually generous.

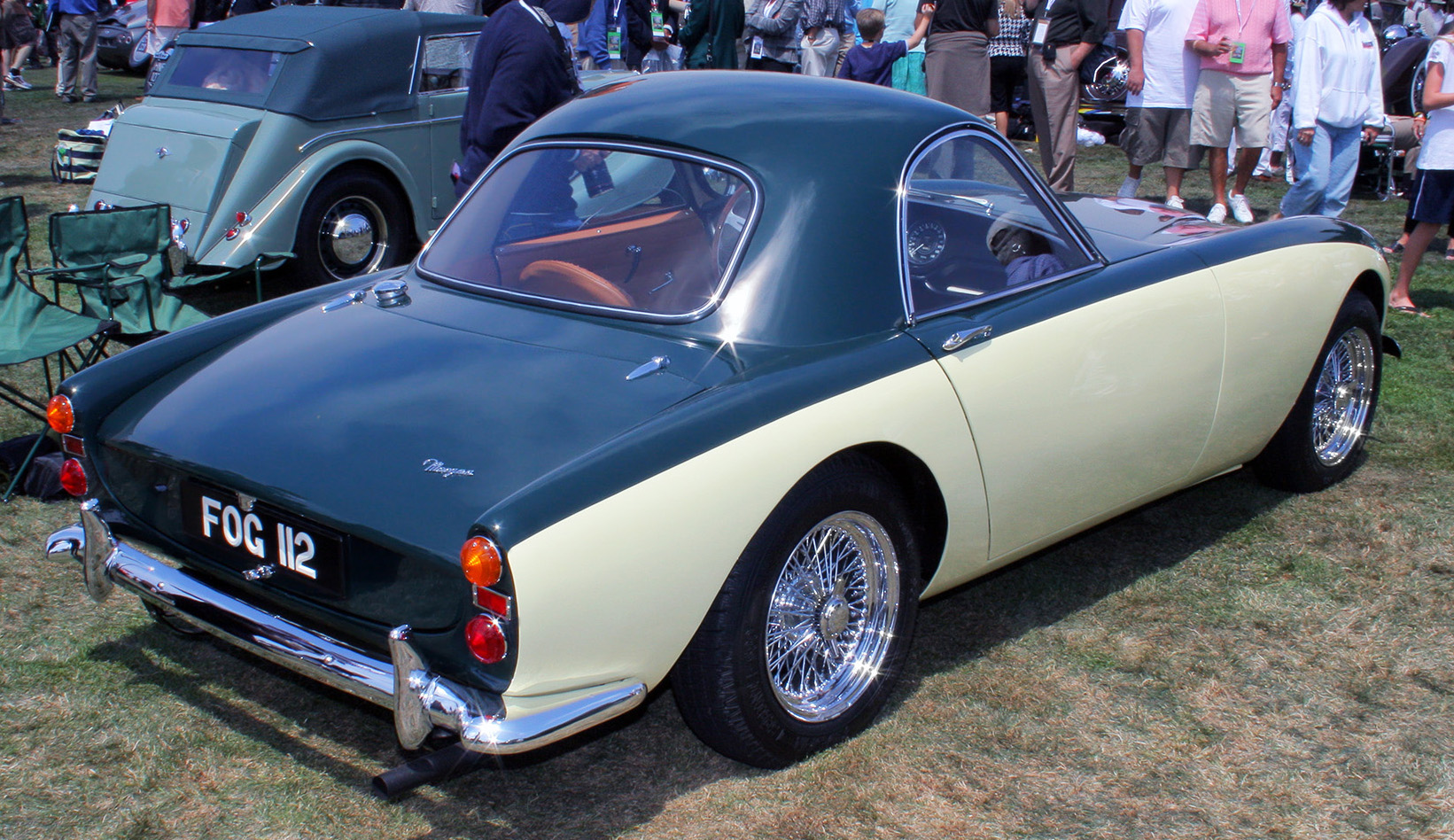
Morgan Plus 4 Plus
