= Morgan 4/4 =

Roadster

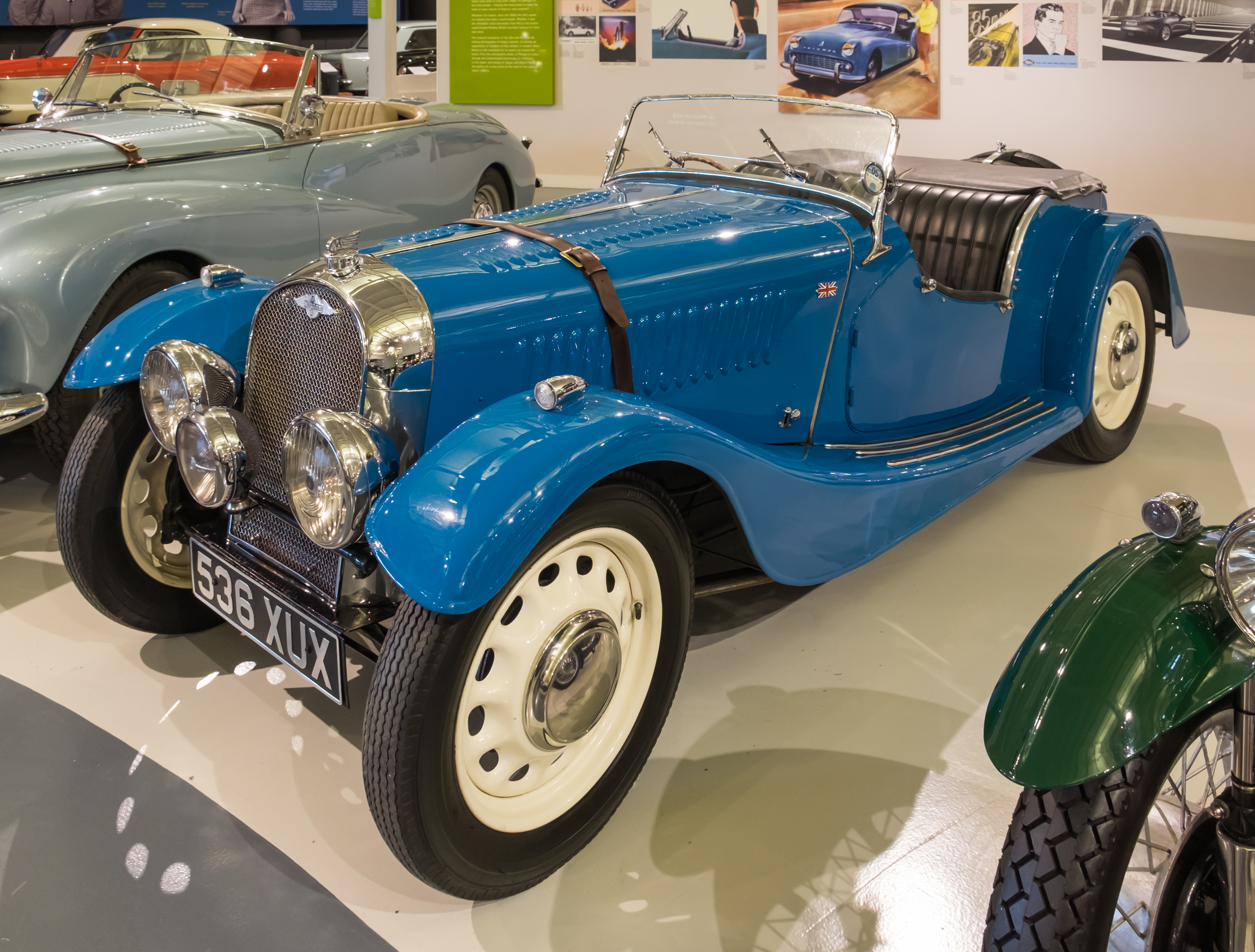
- A 1939 Morgan 4/4

Overview
- Manufacturer: Morgan Motor Company
- Production: 1936–2018
- Assembly: United Kingdom: Malvern, Worcestershire, England

Body and chassis
- Class: Front mid-engined Sports car
- Body style: 2-door roadster
- Related: Morgan +4

Powertrain
- Engine: 1.1 lite Coventry Climax; 1.8 litre Ford engine 1.6 litre Ford Sigma engine

The Morgan 4/4 is a British motor car which was produced by the Morgan Motor Company from 1936 to 2018. It was Morgan's first car with four wheels, the name indicating that the model has four wheels and four cylinders (earlier Morgans had been three-wheelers, typically with V-twin engines). Early publicity and advertising material variously referred to the model as "4/4", "4-4", "Four Four", and similar names, but from the outset the factory designation was always "4/4".

Apart from a break during World War II (and the period March 1951 to September 1955), the 4/4 was in continuous production from its debut in 1936 until 2018. This span of 73 years was one of the longest production periods of any car in history. Engine capacity has increased from the 1,122 cc Coventry Climax engine in 1936 to a 1.8-litre Ford engine in 2004. From 2009 until the model was discontinued in 2018 a 1.6-litre Ford Sigma engine was fitted. Power has ranged from 34 to 125 bhp (25 to 93 kW) over the decades.

== 4/4 Two-Seater ==
Morgan 4/4 Series I
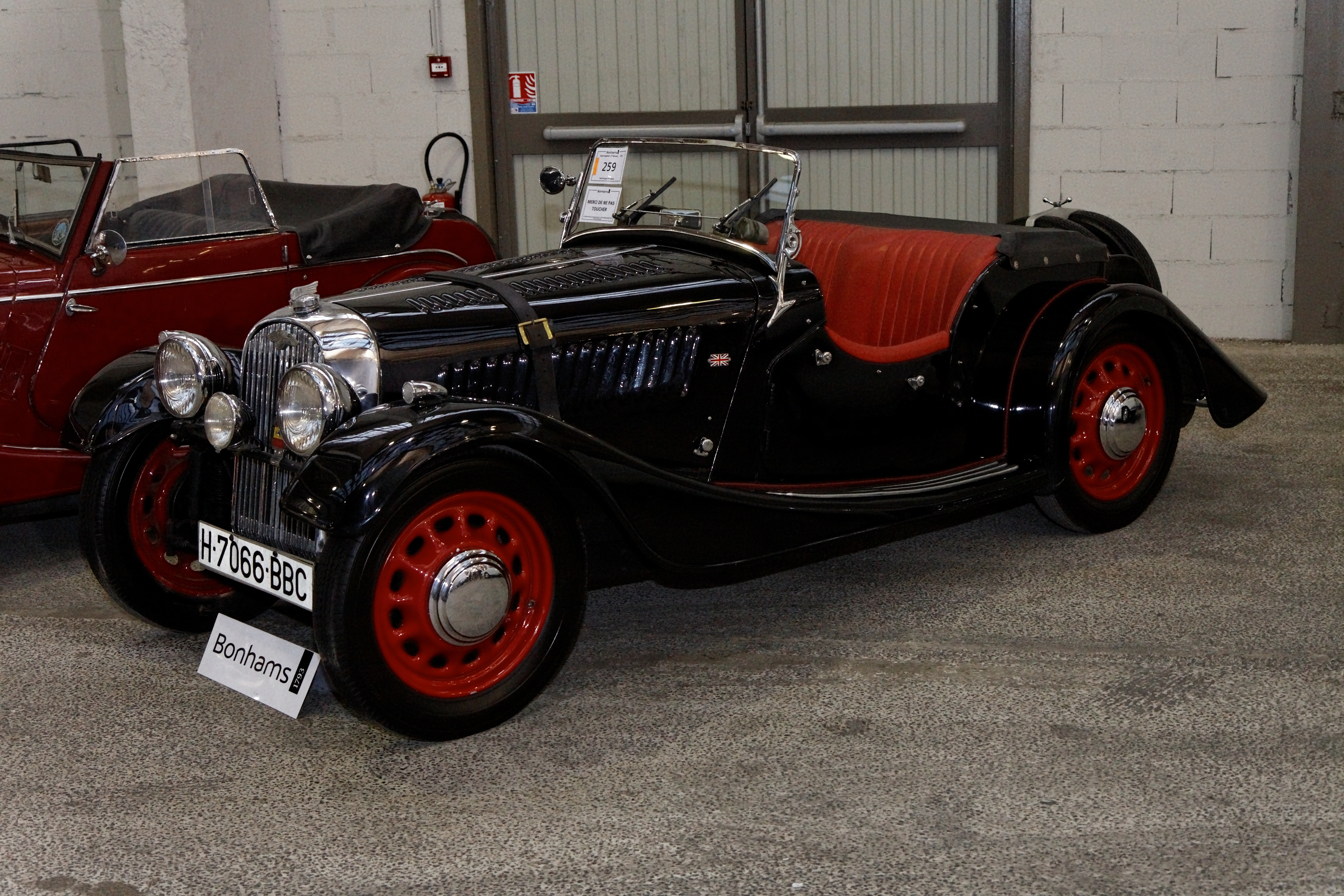
- Morgan 4/4 Sports two-seater, 1947

Overview
- Production: 1936–1950; 1,720 made

Powertrain
- Engine: 1.1 L Coventry Climax I4; 1.2 L Standard I4

Dimensions
- Wheelbase: 92 in (2,337 mm)

The original open two-seater 4/4 was introduced in 1936 and became the most popular of the three body options available. 663 were built by 1939 and 249 more from 1946 to 1950, representing 53% of the overall production.

For the first years, the car had a 1,122cc Coventry Climax engine with 34 bhp (25 kW), superseded from 1939 by a Standard Special 1,267cc overhead valve engine with 38.8 bhp (29 kW). A four-speed Meadows gearbox was used until 1938, then a Moss gearbox.

=== 4/4 Four-Seater ===
The four-seat version was introduced in 1937; 99 examples were built by 1939 and a further 140 from 1946 to 1950.

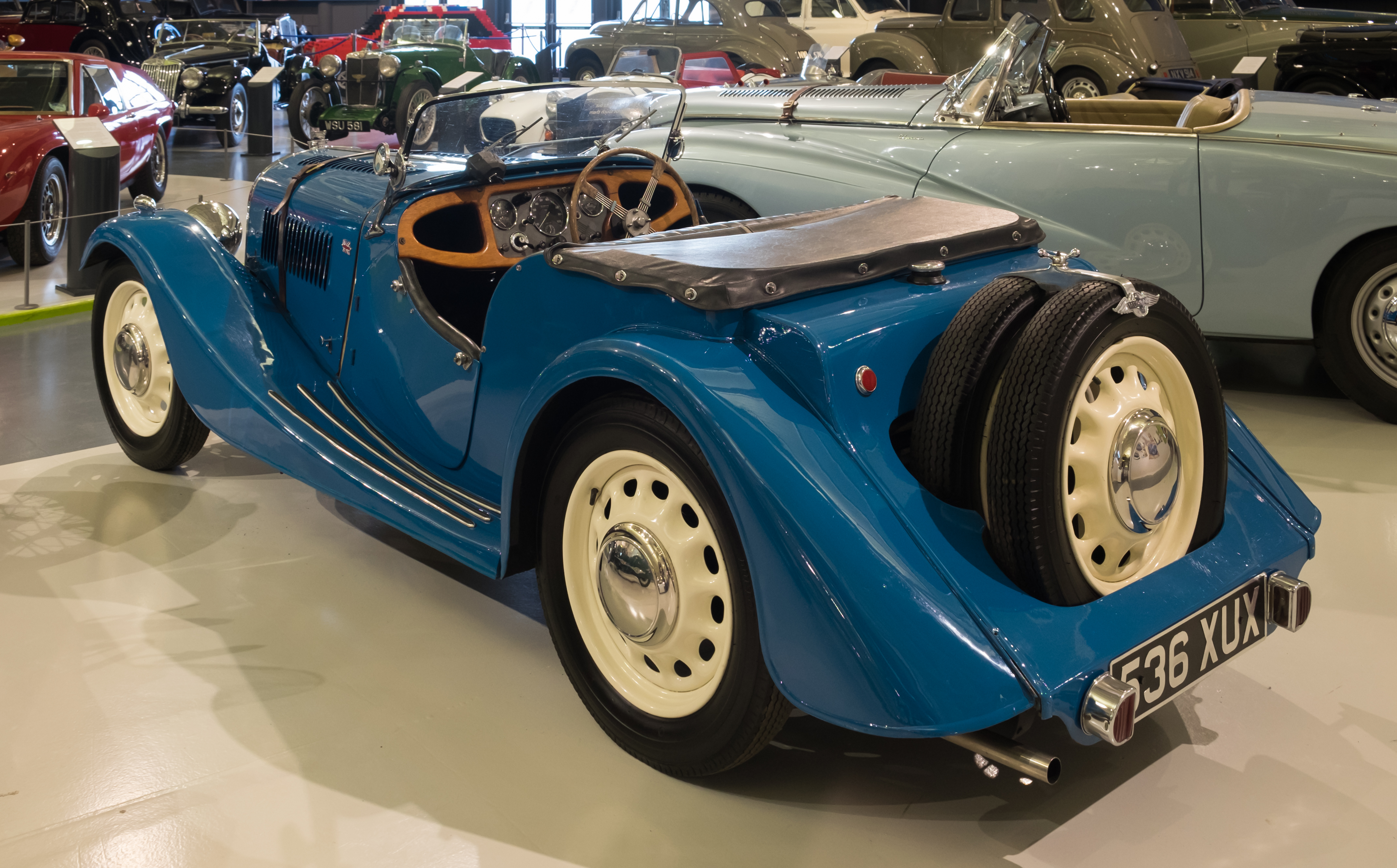
1939 Morgan 4/4

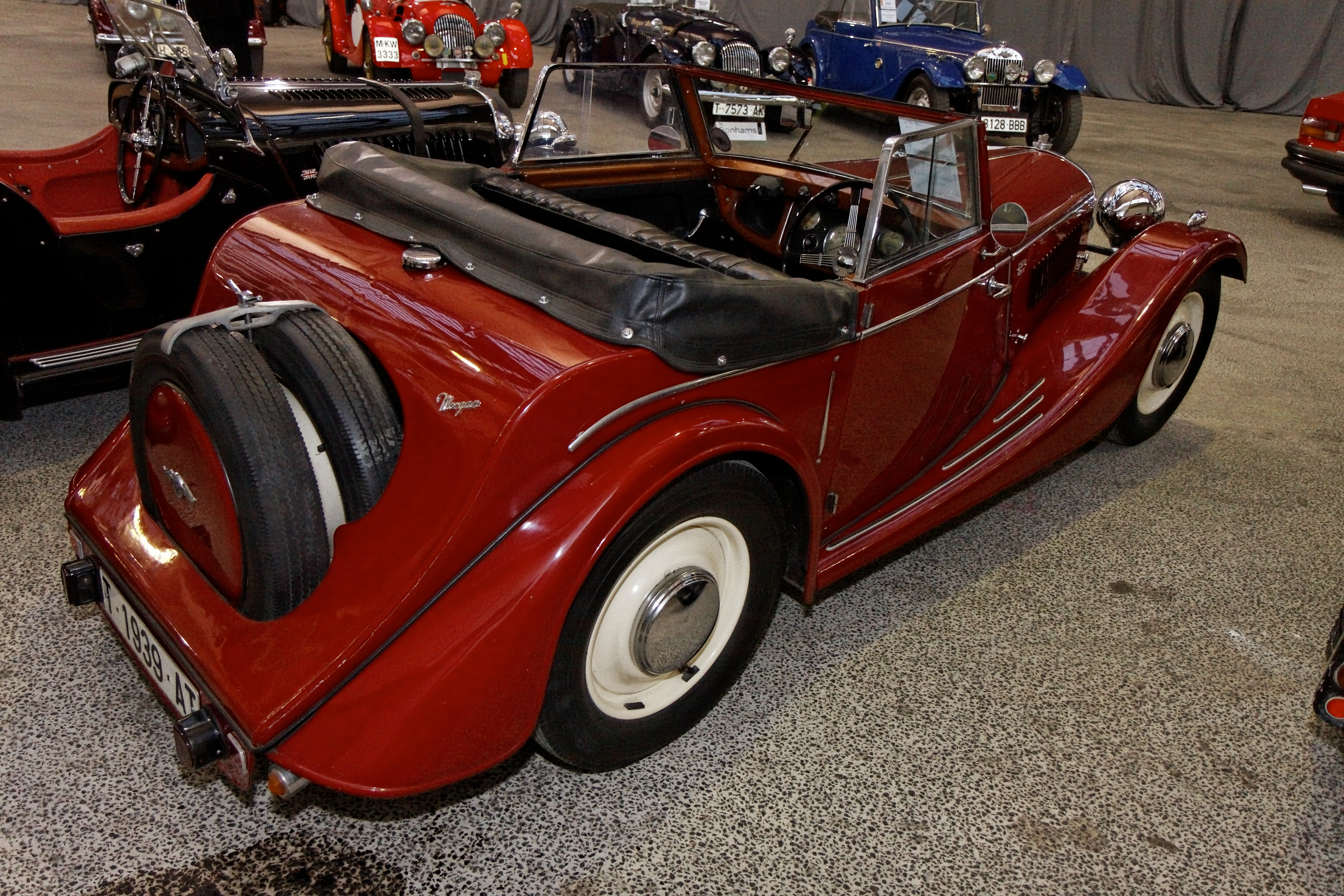
Rear view of 1939 Drophead Coupé

=== 4/4 Drophead Coupé ===
The Drophead Coupé was introduced in 1938 with 58 built by 1939 and another 106 from 1946 to 1950. This has a better folding roof and permanent window frames, along with certain other creature comforts.

== 4/4 Series II ==
Morgan 4/4 Series II
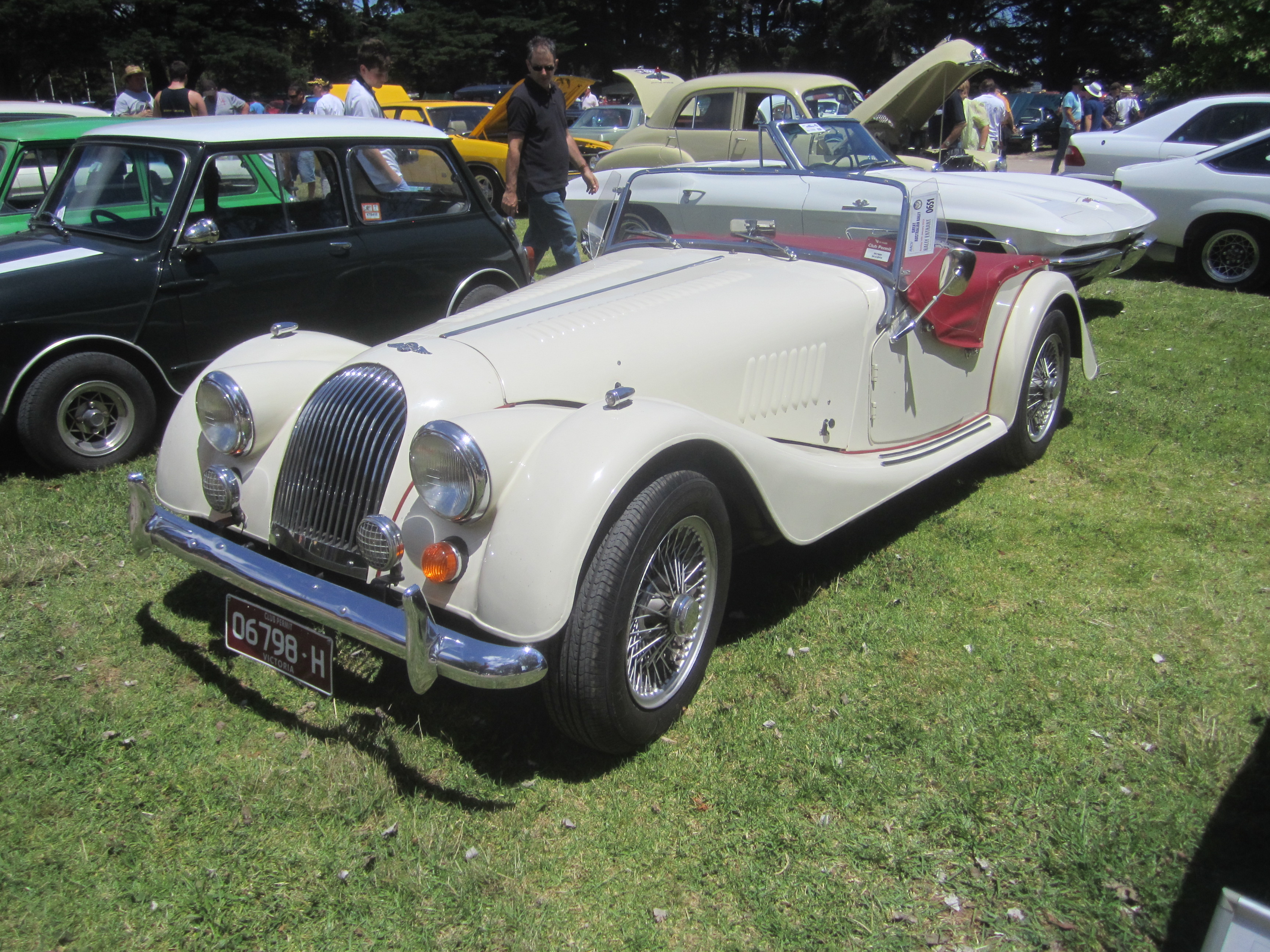

Overview
- Production: 1955–1960; 386 made

Powertrain
- Engine: 1,172 cc Ford 10HP SV I4

Dimensions
- Wheelbase: 96 in (2,438 mm)
- Length: 144 in (3,658 mm)
- Width: 56 in (1,422 mm)
- Height: 49 in (1,245 mm)

The Series II was introduced in 1955 with 386 built by October 1960. Although very similar in appearance to the model it replaced, it was virtually a new car with a chassis based on the one used in the Morgan Plus 4. The traditional independent front suspension using sliding pillars and coil springs was fitted with a rigid axle and semi-elliptic leaf springs at the rear. Disc wheels were fitted as standard items.

A side-valve 1,172 cc Ford 100E engine was used with a Ford three-speed gearbox. The engine produced 36 bhp (27 kW). Hydraulic brakes with 9 in (229 mm) drums were fitted. It was also available in 40 bhp (30 kW) 'Competition' form with Aquaplane head conversion, twin S.U. carburettors, and an improved gearshift linkage.

Inside there was a bench seat back and individual squabs covered in PVC, with leather as an option, and rubber floor covering. A heater was available as an option as was a rev counter and more surprisingly, direction indicators.

In 1956, The Motor magazine tested a Series II and recorded a top speed of 75.3 mph (121.2 km/h), acceleration from 0-60 mph (97 km/h) in 26.9 seconds and a fuel consumption of 35.1 miles per imperial gallon (8.0 L/100 km; 29.2 mpg_{‑US}). The test car cost £713 including taxes.

== 4/4 Series III ==
Morgan 4/4 Series III

Overview
- Production: 1960–1961; 58 made

Powertrain
- Engine: 997 cc Ford Anglia I4

The short-lived Series III was introduced in October 1960 and 58 were built by November 1961 when the Series IV arrived. The chassis was essentially the same as that used on the Series II but the track was increased by 2 inches (50mm). Hydraulic shock absorbers replaced the old Hartford friction type.

A 39 bhp (29 kW; 40 PS) overhead valve 997cc Ford Anglia 105E engine and Ford four-speed gearbox were used.

== 4/4 Series IV ==
Morgan 4/4 Series IV

Overview
- Production: 1961–1963; 114 made

Powertrain
- Engine: 1.3 L Ford Straight-4

Dimensions
- Wheelbase: 96 in (2,438 mm)
- Length: 150 in (3,810 mm)
- Width: 56 in (1,422 mm)
- Height: 48 in (1,219 mm)

The Series IV introduced October 1961 with 114 built by March 1963 had a 62 bhp, 1340 cc, Ford Classic 109E engine and Ford four-speed gearbox. Front 11 in (279 mm) disc brakes were now fitted.

The Motor magazine tested a Series IV in 1962 and found it had a top speed of 80.3 mph (129.2 km/h), acceleration from 0-60 mph (97 km/h) in 18.6 seconds and a touring fuel consumption of 32.0 miles per imperial gallon (8.8 L/100 km; 26.6 mpg_{‑US}). The test car cost £729 including taxes on the home market.

== 4/4 Series V ==
Morgan 4/4 Series V
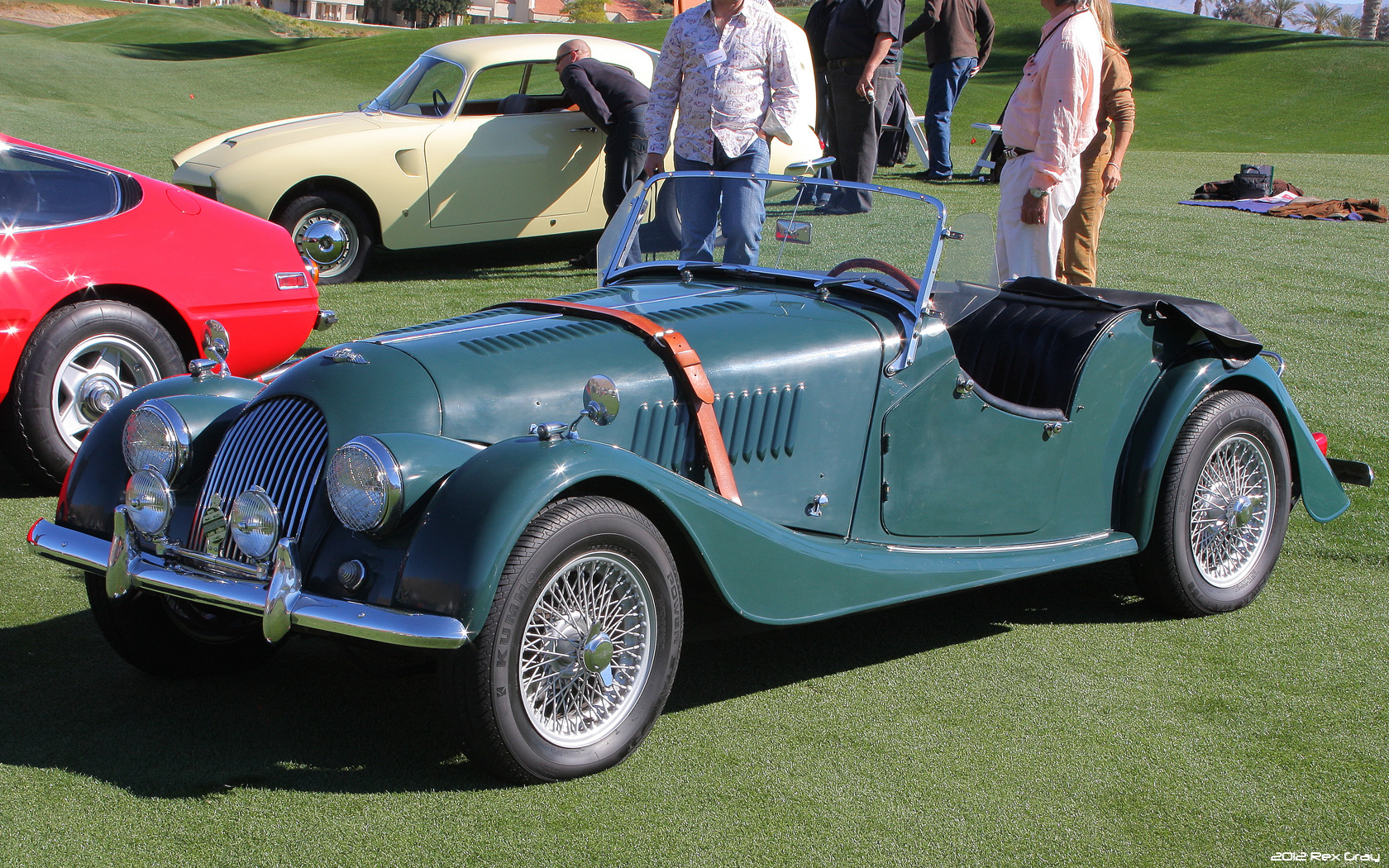

Overview
- Production: 1963–1968; 639 made

Powertrain
- Engine: 1.5 L Ford Straight-4

The Series V was introduced in February 1963 with 639 built by March 1968.

A 65 bhp, 1498cc, Ford Cortina 116E engine and Ford four-speed gearbox were used.

== 4/4 1600 ==
Morgan 4/4 1600
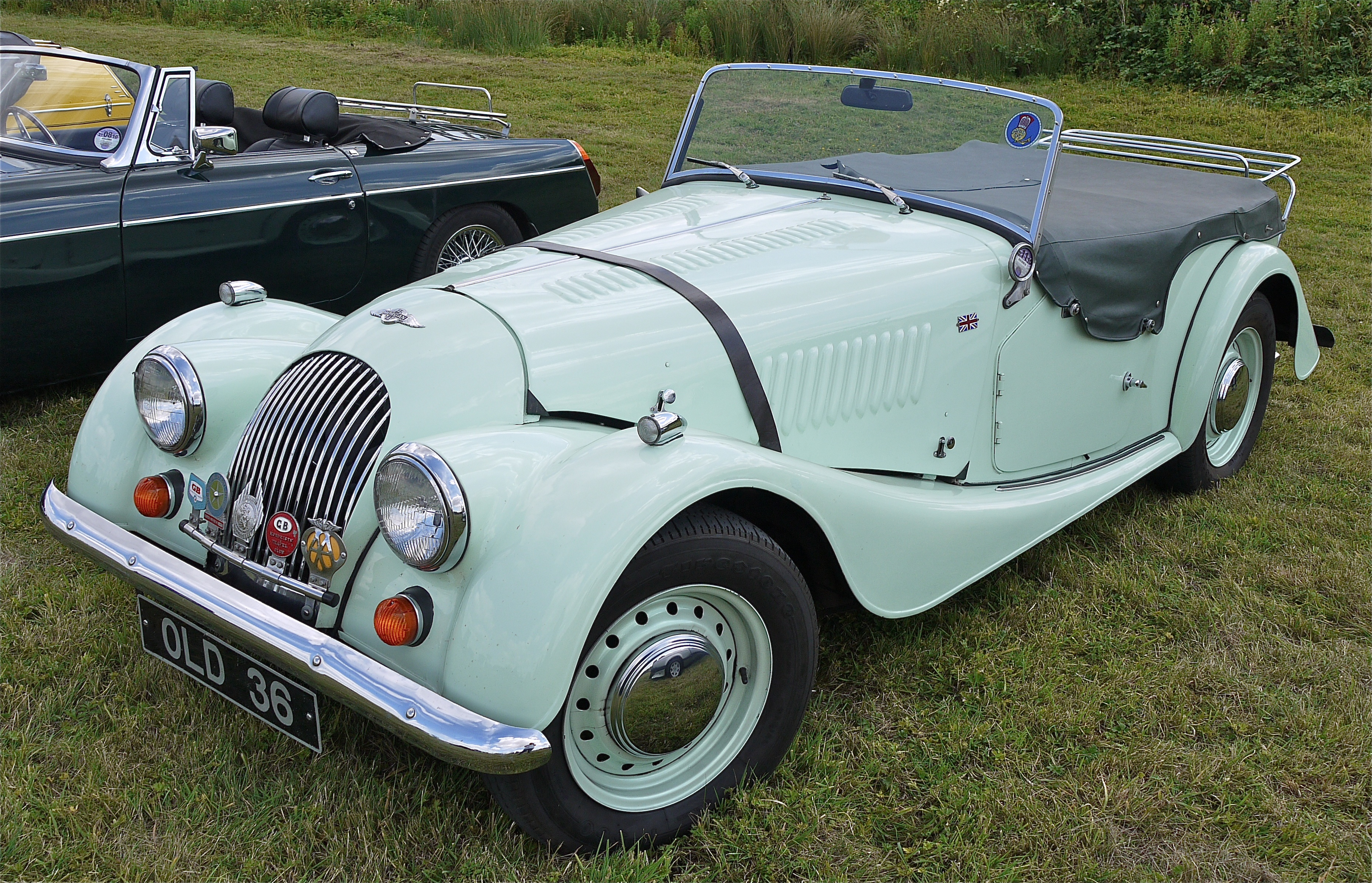

Overview
- Production: 1968–1993; 5448 made

Powertrain
- Engine: 1584 cc Fiat DOHC I4; 1597 cc Ford CVH SOHC I4; 1599 cc Ford Kent OHV I4

The car was further updated in 1968 to become the 1600 with two- and four-seat open bodies available. The 4/4 1600 also benefitted from minor improvements to the body, including door handles from the Land Rover.

=== Ford Kent Crossflow engine ===
The 4/4 1600 was introduced in February 1968 fitted with a variety of Ford 1599 cc Kent engines of type 2737E (70 bhp), type 2737GT (95.5 bhp) and type 2265E (95.5 bhp) from 1971 and a Ford four-speed gearbox. Detail improvements took place over the years, with fluted taillights introduced in 1971 and three (rather than two) windscreen wipers being installed from 1976 on. Safety improvements include dual circuit brakes, a padded dashboard, and a cable-operated clutch; these all appeared in 1971.

A total of 3513 were built by March 1982.

=== Fiat Twin-Cam engine ===
The Morgan 4/4 1600 TC was introduced in November 1981. Offered as a more powerful alternative to the Ford-engined variants, this was fitted with a 97 bhp (72 kW), 1584 cc Fiat twin-cam engine and five-speed Fiat gearbox.

96 were built by November 1985. Morgan also went on to install the 2-litre version of the Fiat Twin Cam in the new Plus Four, from 1985.

=== Ford CVH engine ===
Introduced in March 1982 with a Ford 1597 cc CVH engine and Ford four-speed gearbox until 1984, after which it was replaced with the five-speed gearbox from the Ford Sierra. The 4/4 received the Plus Four's wider wings beginning in 1985. From 1986 steering was changed from the original cam and peg to a Gemmer recirculating ball system.

1652 were built by November 1991.

=== Ford CVH EFI engine ===
From November 1991, a 100 bhp (75 kW) Ford 1597 cc CVH engine with electronic fuel injection was used. 187 were built by January 1993, when the 1800 version was introduced.

== 4/4 1800 ==
Morgan 4/4 1800
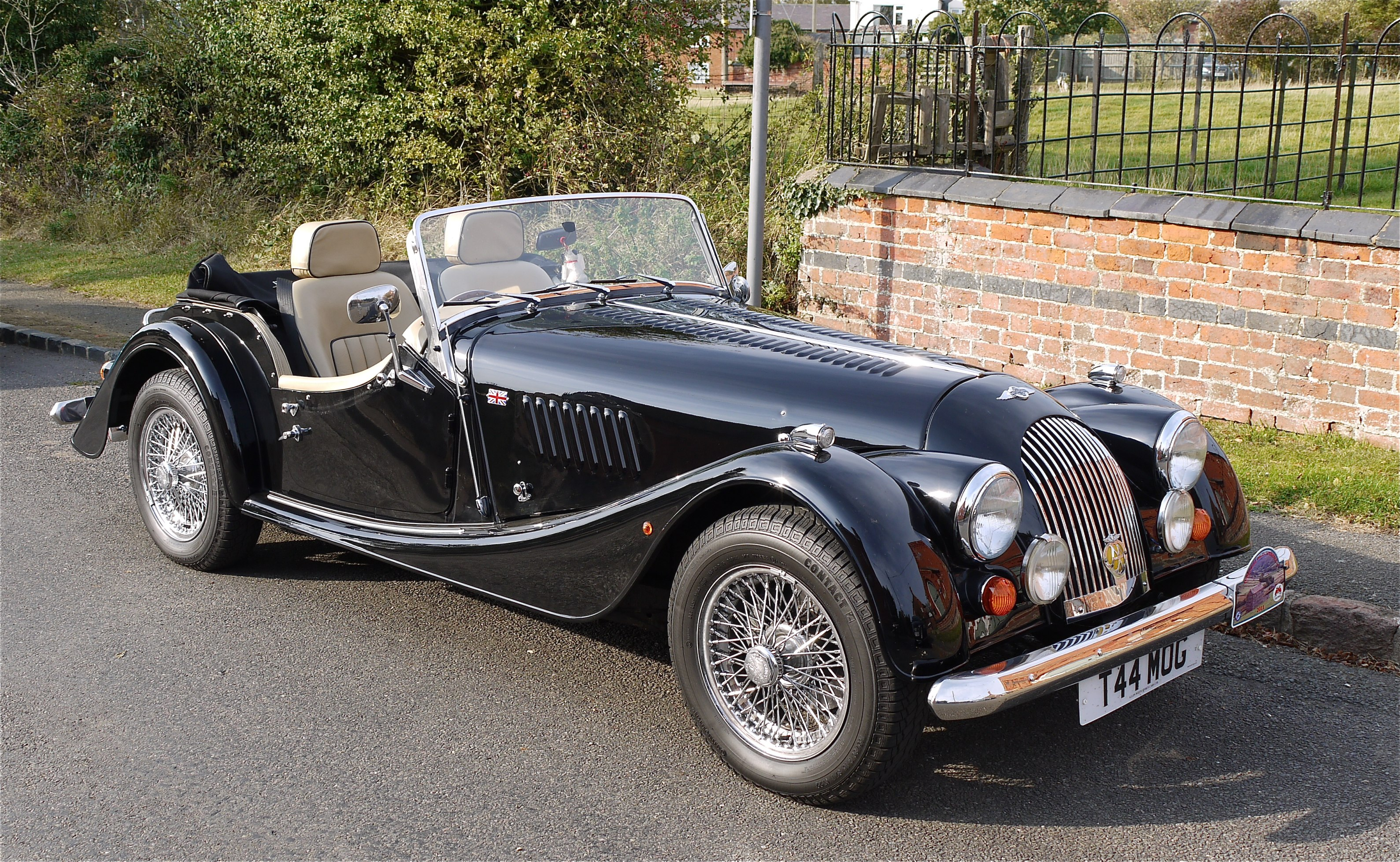
- 1999 Morgan 4/4 1800

Overview
- Production: 1993–2009

Powertrain
- Engine: 1,796 cc Zetec R I4; 1,798 cc Duratec I4

=== Ford Zetec engine ===
Starting in April 1993, the Morgan 4/4 used a 114 bhp (85 kW; 116 PS) Ford 1,796cc 16-valve Zetec R engine.

==== Runabout ====
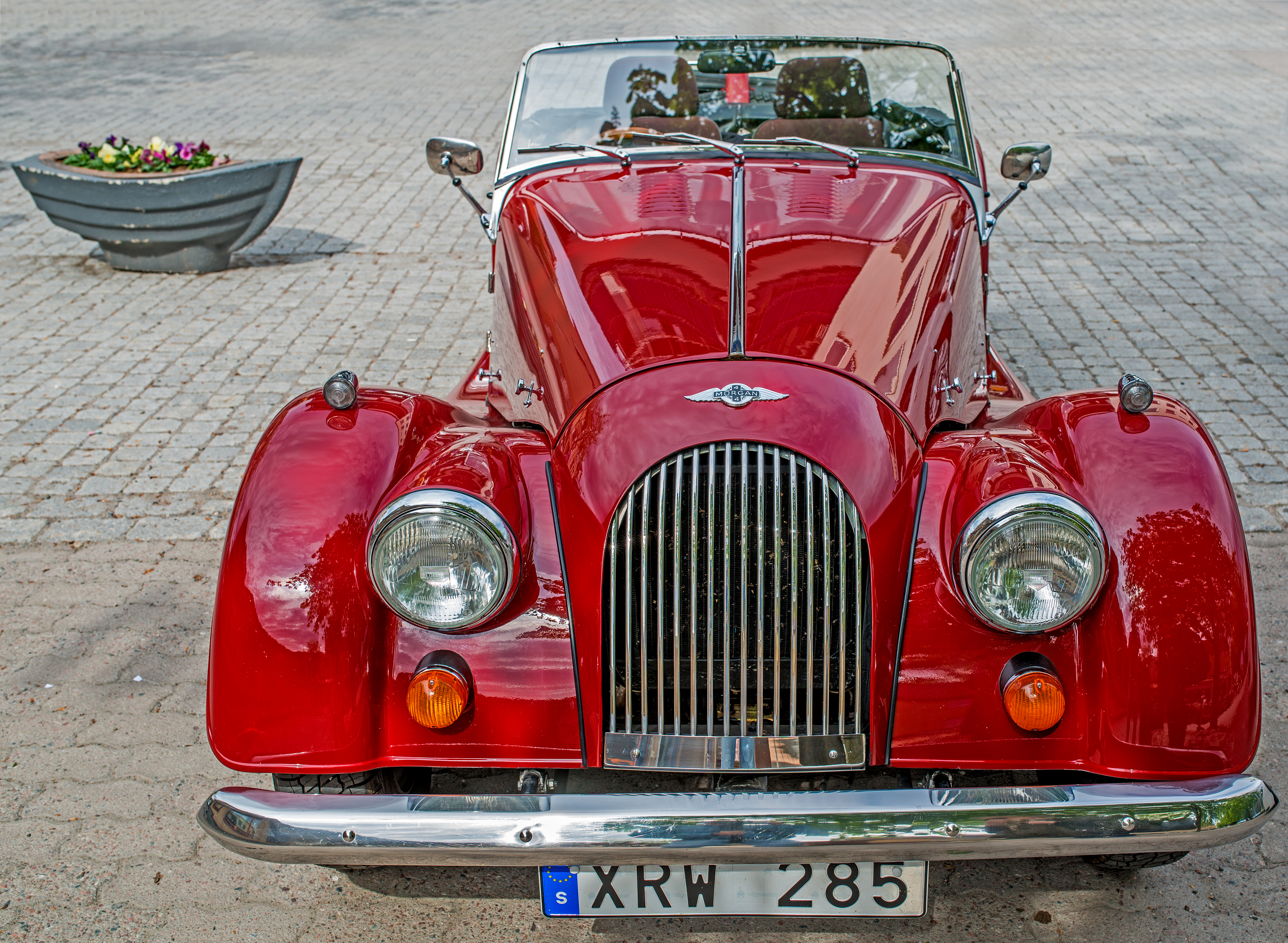
Morgan Runabout in Dark Red; note fewer louvres

In 2003, Morgan launched a new entry-level model named the Runabout based on the 4/4. It was available in three standard colours only, with a standard no-option specification. The Runabout could be recognised by the reduced number of bonnet louvres.

=== Ford Duratec engine ===
From 2006 to 2009, the 4/4 sported a 125 bhp (93 kW) Ford Duratec 1,798 cc 16-valve all-alloy engine of Mazda origins. On these models the exhaust is on the right side. In January 2006, a "70th Anniversary Special edition" was presented, celebrating 70 years having passed since the introduction of the 4/4. This received black paint and special wheels, similar to those used on the original "flat-rad" Morgan. 142 were planned to be made. In spite of seventy years of production, the accumulated figure had not yet reached 10,000 in 2006.

== 4/4 1.6 Litre (2009–2018) ==
Morgan 4/4 1.6 Litre
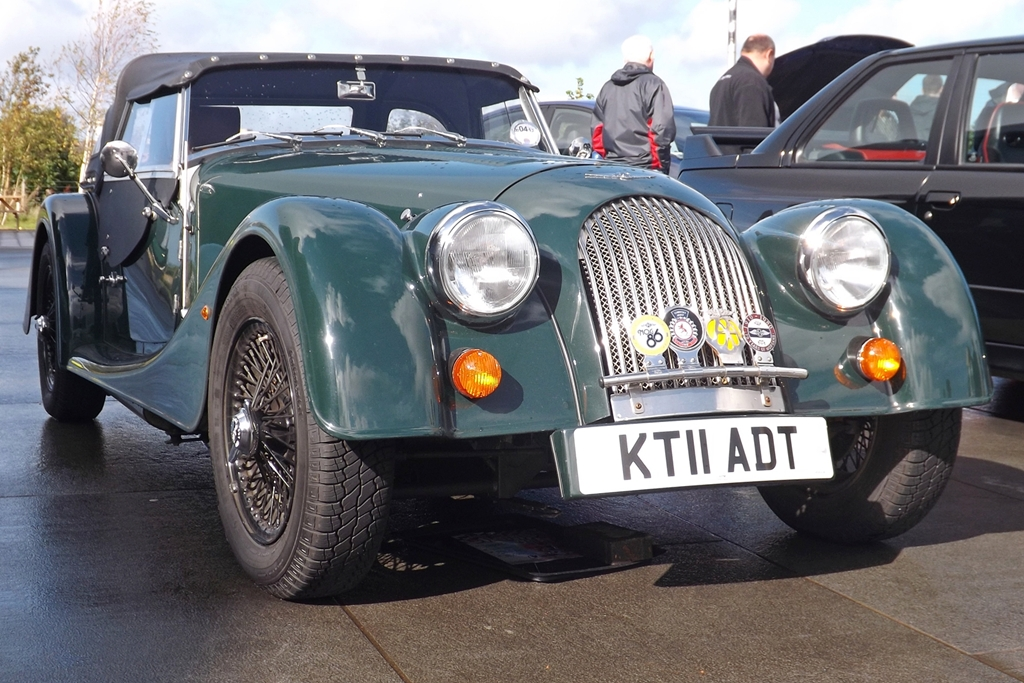

Overview
- Production: 2009–2018

Powertrain
- Engine: 1,595 cc Sigma 416 I4

Dimensions
- Length: 4,010 mm (158 in)
- Width: 1,630 mm (64 in)
- Curb weight: 795 kg (1,753 lb)

From 2009 to 2018, the Ford Sigma engine was used. This model displaces 1,595 cc and produces 110 bhp (82 kW), enough for a 185 km/h (115 mph) top speed. The engine drives the rear wheels via a five-speed manual gearbox. Initially, a Ford gearbox was used, then from 2012 a Mazda unit was fitted.
