= Evo (magazine) =

British automobile magazine

- Cover of the November 2024 issue
- Editor: Stuart Gallagher
- Categories: Automobile
- Frequency: Monthly (United Kingdom & India); Bimonthly (Poland & France)
- Total circulation: 17,310 (2023)
- First issue: November 1998; 27 years ago
- Company: Carwow
- Country: United Kingdom
- Language: English, Polish, French
- Website: evo.co.uk evomagazine.pl evoindia.com

Evo is a British automobile magazine dedicated to performance cars, from hot hatches to supercars, published by Carwow.

== History ==
In 1995, then Harpenden-based farmer and property developer Harry Metcalfe had become involved in car tests for magazine publishers, after he purchased the first Maserati Ghibli Cup in 1994, through which he had made contacts into the motoring media. After EMAP decided to integrate specialist magazine Performance Car into Car magazine in 1998, Metcalfe and motoring journalist John Barker began forming plans to fill what they saw as a gap in the specialist motoring magazine market.

Metcalfe formed the business and would run the business side, with Barker joined by writers including Richard Meaden, David Vivian and Peter Tomalin all holding a minority share. Metcalfe created a business plan based on potentially selling his family holiday home in Wales, and although turned down for a loan for the business, he initially financed the three month launch period through a £275,000 loan originally designated to fund a grain storage shed on his farm. Employing a research group, the original name was proposed by them to be Roadsport Magazine (also the name of a hill climbing journal). At a group brain storming session one day, after pointing out that there was a mobile phone company called Orange and a magazine called Red - neither of which included what they did in the title, but had an association with their market - whilst flicking through Autocar magazine Metcalfe suggested Evo based on seeing a Maserati Quattroporte Evoluzione in the future cars section. After proving successful in branding, the name stuck.

The first issue of Evo was produced in November 1998, and after the publication of the third issue in January 1999 - the Car Of The Year edition - the business was cash flow positive, with a worldwide readership of 30,000. Later writers included Henry Catchpole, Jethro Bovingdon, Russell Bulgin and Chris Harris. Evo was aimed, created and edited to be a virtual maverick car club, with typical stunts including buying and driving an original Audi Quattro to the launch of the Audi TT in Italy, and the forming of a supercar pool including a Ferrari F40.

Conscious that the business's success was bound to a single 13x a year publication, Metcalfe was approached by Future Publishing to sell the business. Conscious of the Evo-gang and approach that had been created, Metcalfe asked the Sales Director to approach his friend Felix Dennis about a counter bid. Dennis Publishing acquired the title in April 2001, with a readership of 40,000.

Dennis Publishing enabled the magazine to reduce its costs in both printing, distribution as well as IT; as well as increasing subscriptions and distribution, especially overseas licensing. The online Evo Forum at the point of takeover was consuming over half of the IT infrastructure costs, but not producing any revenue. Unable to form a positive business plan, the Evo Forum was shut down. Metcalfe continued as editorial director of Evo in Dennis' growing Automotive division, which included Auto Express, then the later purchases of Octane magazine and Land Rover Monthly as well as the new launches Carbuyer and DrivingElectric.

Dennis' automotive publishing division was spun-off as independent company called Autovia in 2021.

Autovia was acquired by automotive online marketplace and content company Carwow in February 2024.

== Profile ==
Evo is now published 12 times a year, with Stuart Gallagher the current editor, with former editors including Peter Tomalin, John Barker and Richard Meaden. Owned by Dennis Publishing and going by the tag-line "The thrill of driving", Evo attempts to immerse the reader in the driving experience of any particular car, and all other aspects are considered secondary to this all emotive 'drive'. While hard data is accumulated in the form of lap-times (for which Evo regularly uses Bedford Autodrome), cornering speeds, and straight-line performance figures, the subjective nature of the driving experience is the paramount factor by which cars are graded by Evo.

Many prominent members of the automotive industry and celebrity automotive enthusiasts have made contributions to Evo, including Gordon Murray, Jeff Daniels, and occasionally Rowan Atkinson. Other contributors are John Simister, Ian Fraser, Martin Buckley, David Yu, Tony Bailey, Paul Bailey, Simon George and Richard Porter.

There are also international editions of Evo for France, Italy, Singapore, Croatia, Czech Republic, Greece, Turkey, Philippines, Malaysia, Thailand, Ukraine, India, Spain and the Middle East They are a little different from the original, and feature more localized content relevant to the respective countries. Editors & writers of the international editions are usually invited for test drives by many performance car companies, from major marques such as Porsche, to small supercar builders such as Pagani and Gumpert.

== Other contributors ==
In addition to the names above, Evo occasionally makes reference to the term 'friends of Evo'. Some of these individuals submit contributions to the magazine, in the form of submissions outlining their experience with their own motorcars. Current such vehicles include the Porsche Carrera GT, Pagani Zonda and Lamborghini Murciélago LP640. This is a slightly different take on the 'fleet' theme often adopted by motoring publications, as the vehicles featured are often press-demonstrators.

== Evo Car of the Year ==
Evo is famous for their year-ending Car of the Year issue, inherited from Evo's predecessor publication Performance Car. Members of the Evo staff take the top performance cars, released to market for the year, to public locations suited to high-performance driving and evaluation. For most years there is also a circuit test. Scotland, Wales, France, Italy, and Portugal are some of the featured locations for the Evo Car of the Year.

Pickup scheme goes like very good results in first drive yields invitation to small group test and very good results in that yields invitation to Car of the Year. Occasionally a particularly excellent first drive impression guarantees a Car of the Year invitation.

1998

- 1 Porsche 911 Carrera 2 (996.1)
- 2 Lotus Elise Sport 135 (S1)
- 3 Ferrari F355 F1
- 4 Subaru Impreza Turbo (GC8)
- 5 Caterham 7 Clubsport 1.8
- 6 Jaguar XKR (X100)
- 7 Mazda MX-5 1.8S (NA.1)
- 8 BMW M Coupé
- 9 Alfa Romeo GTV 3.0 24v
- 10 Audi S4 (B5/8D)

1999

- 1 Porsche 911 GT3 (996.1)
- 2 Ferrari 360 Modena
- 3 Subaru Impreza RB5 (GC8)
- 4 BMW M5 (E39)
- 5 Peugeot 306 Rallye
- 6 Aston Martin DB7 Vantage
- 7 Porsche Boxster S (986)
- 8 Audi A6 4.2 V8 Quattro (C5/4B)
- 9 Nissan Skyline GT-R V-Spec (R34)
- 9 Bentley Arnage Red Label
- 11 Lotus Esprit Sport 350
- 12 Fiat Punto Sporting

2000

- 1 Porsche 911 Turbo (996.1)
- 2 Lamborghini Diablo 6.0 VT
- 3 Subaru Impreza P1 (GC8)
- 4 Lotus 340R
- 5 Vauxhall VX220

2001

- 1 Pagani Zonda C12 S
- 2 BMW M3 (E46)
- 3 Lamborghini Murcielago
- 4 TVR Tamora
- 5 Porsche 911 Carrera (996.2)
- 6 Lotus Elise (S2)
- 7 Aston Martin Vanquish (2001)
- 8 Ruf R Turbo
- 9 Mitsubishi Evo VII
- 10 Mini Cooper (R50)
- 11 Renault Clio 172
- 12 Mercedes SL 500 (R230)

2002

- 1 Honda NSX-R (NA2)
- 2 Porsche 911 Carrera 4S (996.2)
- 3 Ferrari 575M Maranello
- 4 Mercedes-Benz SL55 AMG (R230)
- 5 Lotus Elise 111S (S2)
- 6 Mini Cooper S (R53)
- 7 Mitsubishi Lancer Evolution VII FQ-300
- 8 Nissan 350Z
- 9 Renaultsport Clio 172 Cup (X65)
- 10 Jaguar XKR-R (X100)
- 11 Subaru Impreza STi PPP (GDB)
- 12 Ford Focus RS (C170)

2003

- 1 Porsche 911 GT3 (996.2)
- 2 Lamborghini Gallardo
- 3 Renaultsport Clio V6 255 (X65)
- 4 Ferrari 360 Challenge Stradale
- 5 Noble M12 GTO-3R

2004

- 1 Porsche 911 Carrera S (997.1)
- 2 Lotus Exige (S2)
- 3 Renaultsport Clio 182 Cup (X65)
- 4 Porsche Boxster (987)
- 5 Lotus Elise 111R (S2)
- 6 Subaru Impreza WRX STI Litchfield Type 25 (GDB)
- 7 Volkswagen Golf GTI (A5/1K)
- 8 Mini Cooper S Works 210 (R53)
- 9 Mitsubishi Lancer Evolution VIII MR FQ-340
- 10 Maserati GranSport
- 11 Mercedes-Benz SLK350 (R171)
- 12 Vauxhall VXR220
- 13 Vauxhall Monaro VXR
- 14 Ariel Atom
- 15 Audi RS6 Plus (C5/4B)

2005

- 1 Ford GT
- 2 Ferrari F430
- 3 Renaultsport Clio 182 Trophy (X65)
- 4 Lamborghini Gallardo SE
- 5 BMW M3 CS (E46)
- 6 Porsche Cayman S (987)
- 7 Aston Martin V8 Vantage (2005)
- 8 BMW M6 (E63)
- 9 Mercedes-Benz SLK55 AMG (R171)
- 10 TVR Sagaris

2006

- 1 Ferrari 599 GTB Fiorano
- 2 Porsche 911 GT3 (997.1)
- 3 Lamborghini Murcielago LP640
- 4 Chevrolet Corvette Z06 (C6)
- 5 Lotus Elise S (S2)
- 6 Jaguar XKR (X150)
- 7 Renaultsport Mégane 230 (X84)
- 8 Mercedes-Benz CLS63 AMG (C219)
- 9 Aston Martin DB9 Sports Pack

2007

- 1 Porsche 911 GT3 RS (997.1)
- 2 Ferrari F430 Scuderia
- 3 Audi R8 (Type 42)
- 4 Mercedes-Benz CLK63 AMG Black Series
- 5 BMW M3 Coupe (E92)
- 6 Honda Civic Type R (FD2)
- 7 Lamborghini Gallardo Superleggera
- 8 Nissan 350Z
- 9 Lotus 2-Eleven
- 10 Mini Cooper S Works (R56)
- 11 Vauxhall VXR8
- 12 Aston Martin DBS

2008

- 1 Nissan GT-R
- 2 Lamborghini Gallardo LP560-4
- 3 Porsche 911 GT2 (997.1)
- 4 Renaultsport Megane R26.R (X84)
- 5 Alfa Romeo 8C Competizione
- 6 Maserati GranTurismo S (M145)
- 7 Aston Martin V8 Vantage (2005)

2009

- 1 Lotus Evora
- 2 Porsche 911 GT3 (997.2)
- 3 Noble M600
- 4 Lamborghini Murcielago LP670-4 SuperVeloce
- 5 Renaultsport Clio 200 Cup (X85)
- 6 Lamborghini Gallardo Balboni
- 7 Aston Martin V12 Vantage
- 8 Ford Focus RS (C307)
- 9 Jaguar XFR (X250)
- 10 Ferrari California
- 11 Mazda MX-5 2.0i Sport (NC.2)
- 12 Volkswagen Scirocco R
- 13 Artega GT

2010

- 1 Porsche 911 GT3 RS (997.2)
- 2 Ferrari 458 Italia
- 3 Porsche 911 GT2 RS (997.2)
- 4 Lexus LFA
- 5 Mercedes-Benz SLS AMG
- 6 Audi R8 V10 Spyder (Type 42)
- 7 Lotus Evora S
- 8 Lamborghini Gallardo LP 570-4 Superleggera
- 9 Ford Focus RS500

2011

- 1 Porsche 911 GT3 RS 4.0 (997.2)
- 2 McLaren MP4-12C
- 3 BMW 1-Series M Coupe (E82)
- 4 Porsche Cayman R (987.2)
- 5 Lotus Elise Club Racer (S2)

2012

- 1= Pagani Huayra (a first-ever tie for eCoty)
- 1= Lotus Exige S V6 (a first-ever tie for eCoty)
- 3 Porsche Boxster S (981)
- 4 McLaren MP4-12C (MY2012)
- 5 Porsche 911 Carrera S (991.1)
- 6 BMW M135i (F20)

2013

- 1 Porsche 911 GT3 (991.1)
- 2 Ferrari F12berlinetta
- 3 Mercedes-Benz SLS AMG Black Series
- 4 Aston Martin V12 Vantage S (2005)
- 5 Audi R8 V10 plus (Type 42)
- 6 Mini John Cooper Works GP (R53)
- 7 Porsche Cayman S (981)
- 8 Alfa Romeo 4C

2014

- 1 Ferrari 458 Speciale
- 2 Jaguar F-Type R Coupé
- 3 Porsche Cayman GTS (981)
- 4 Volkswagen Golf R (A7/5G)
- 5 Renaultsport Megane 275 Trophy-R (X95)
- 6 BMW i8
- 7 McLaren 650S Spider
- 8 Aston Martin Vanquish (2012)
- 9 BMW M3 (F80)
- 10 Audi S1 (8X)

2015

- 1 Porsche Cayman GT4 (981)
- 2 McLaren 675LT
- 3 Porsche 911 GT3 RS (991.1)
- 4 Ferrari 488 GTB
- 5 Lamborghini Aventador LP750-4 SuperVeloce
- 6 Lotus Evora 400
- 7 Chevrolet Camaro Z/28 (Mk V)
- 8 SEAT Leon Cupra Ultimate Sub8 (5F)
- 9 Mercedes-AMG GT S (C190)
- 10 Honda Civic Type R (FK2)
- 11 Peugeot 308 GTi 270 by Peugeot Sport (T9)

2016

- 1 Porsche 911 R
- 2 Volkswagen Golf GTI Clubsport S (A7/5G)
- 3 McLaren 570S
- 4 Honda NSX (NC1) & Audi R8 V10 Plus (Type 4S) (tie)
- 6 BMW M4 GTS (F82) & Alfa Romeo Giulia Quadrifoglio (tie)
- 8 Lamborghini Huracan LP580-2
- 9 Aston Martin Vantage GT8 (2005)
- 10 Ford Focus RS (C346)
- 11 Mercedes-AMG C63 S Coupe (W205)
- 12 BMW M2 (F87)

2017 (Only year that EVO changed the format for "Car of the Year")

- Supermini: Peugeot 208 GTi by Peugeot Sport (A9)
- Hot Hatch: Honda Civic Type R (FK8)
- Sports Saloon: Alfa Romeo Giulia Veloce
- Supersaloon: Alfa Romeo Giulia Quadrifoglio
- Sports Car: Lotus Elise Sport 220 (S3)
- Coupe: BMW M4 Competition Package (F82)
- SUV: Porsche Macan GTS (95B)
- GT: Bentley Continental GT (Mk III)
- Supercar: McLaren 720S
- Hypercar: Bugatti Chiron
- Overall: McLaren 720S

2018

- 1 McLaren 600LT
- 2 Alpine A110 (2017)
- 3 Porsche 911 GT2 RS (991.2)
- 4 Ford Fiesta ST (B479)
- 5 BMW M2 Competition (F87)
- 6 Ferrari 488 Pista
- 7 Volkswagen Up! GTI
- 8 Renaultsport Mégane 300 Trophy (XFB)

2019

- 1 Porsche 718 Cayman GT4 (982)
- 2 Mercedes-AMG GT R Pro (C190)
- 3 Mercedes-AMG A45 S (W177)
- 4 Jaguar XE SV Project 8 Touring
- 5 Renaultsport Mégane 300 Trophy-R (XFB)
- 6 Morgan Plus Six

2020

- 1 BMW M2 CS (F87)
- 2 McLaren 765LT
- 3 Lamborghini Huracán Evo RWD
- 4 Toyota GR Yaris (XP210)
- 5 Ferrari F8 Tributo
- 6 Honda Civic Type R (FK8 facelift)
- 7 Porsche 718 Cayman GTS 4.0 (982)
- 8 Porsche 911 Turbo S (992.1)

2021

- 1 BMW M5 CS (F90)
- 2 Lamborghini Huracán STO
- 3 Porsche 911 GT3 Touring (992.1)
- 4= BMW M3 Competition (G80)
- 4= Honda Civic Type R Limited (FK8 facelift)
- 6 Hyundai I20 N (BC3)
- 7 Aston Martin Vantage F1 Edition (2018)
- 8 Ferrari SF90 Stradale

2022

- 1 Maserati MC20
- 2 Toyota GR86 (ZN8)
- 3= Ferrari 296 GTB
- 3= McLaren Artura
- 5 Porsche 718 Cayman GT4 RS (982)
- 6 Audi R8 Performance RWD (Type 4S)
- 7 BMW M4 CSL (G82)
- 8 Mercedes-AMG SL55 (R232)

2023

- 1 Porsche 911 GT3 RS (992.1)
- 2 Alpine A110R (2017)
- 3 McLaren 750S
- 4 Lamborghini Huracán Sterrato
- 5 Honda Civic Type R (FL5)
- 6 BMW M3 CS (G80)
- 7 Porsche 911 Carrera T (992.1)
- 8 Aston Martin DB12
- 9 Maserati GranTurismo Trofeo (M189)

2024

- 1 Porsche 911 S/T (992.1)
- 2 Mazda MX-5 RF 2.0 (ND.2)
- 3 McLaren Artura Spider
- 4 Aston Martin Vantage (2018)
- 5 Audi RS6 Avant GT (C8/5G)
- 6 Toyota GR Yaris (XP210)
- 7 BMW M4 CS (G82)
- 8 Morgan Plus Four
- 9 Ford Mustang Dark Horse (S650)

2025

- 1 Lamborghini Revuelto
- 2 Porsche 911 GT3 (992.2)
- 3 Alpine A110 R Ultime
- 4 Ferrari 12Cilindri
- 5 BMW M2 CS (G87)
- 6 Morgan Supersport
- 7 Maserati GT2 Stradale
- 8 Chevrolet Corvette E-Ray (C8)
- 9 Aston Martin Vanquish (2024)
- 10 Land Rover Defender Octa
- 11 Mercedes-AMG GT63 Pro (C192)
- 12 Audi RS3 Sportback (8Y)
