= Carwow =

Online car retail company

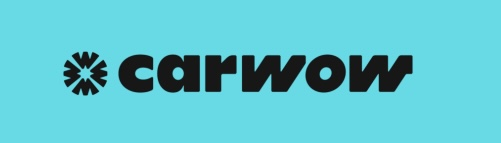
- Company type: Private
- Available in: English
- Founded: 2011; 15 years ago
- Headquarters: London, United Kingdom
- Area served: Worldwide
- Owners: Balderton Capital, Episode 1 Ventures
- Founders: James Hind, Alexandra Margolis, David Santoro
- Key people: John Veichmanis (CEO)
- Industry: Automotive
- Website: https://www.carwow.co.uk/
- Current status: Active

Carwow

YouTube information
- Channel: Carwow
- Years active: 2016-present
- Genre: Car Reviews
- Subscribers: 10.0 million
- Views: 4.6 billion
- Last updated: March 2025

Carwow is an online marketplace for buying and selling cars. It uses the reverse marketplace model to remove the need for customers to negotiate with dealers when buying or selling their cars. When buying a new car, users choose the car they want, along with the various specifications and features, and then receive offers directly from dealers. When selling a car, users upload some basic details about their car (such as the registration number, mileage, and some photos), after which different car dealers are invited to bid to buy the car directly from them. It also provides information to prospective purchasers and gives feedback on rogue dealers. The company has a YouTube page, run by motoring journalist and Carwow's chief content officer Mat Watson, where different cars are reviewed.

The company has partnered with the RAC as part of RAC Cars' ‘search, buy, sell’ website.

Carwow was co-founded by James Hind, Alexandra Margolis, and David Santoro and launched in May 2013. Carwow’s investors include Balderton Capital, Episode 1 Ventures, Samos Investments, and Accel Partners. The company had sold over 20,000 cars valued at £550 million by January 2016.

== History ==
The company was originally launched in 2010 as a car research site, Carbuzz. It offered aggregated expert reviews, user reviews, statistics, videos and images to help consumers looking to purchase a new car find the best vehicle for their taste, budget and requirements.

In May 2013, it was re-launched as a car-buying platform. The company then raised £1.3m in venture capital finance from Balderton Capital, Episode 1 Ventures and Samos Investments, and several angel investors, including Alex Chesterman and Simon Murdoch, in February 2014 to fund growth.

In 2014, its investors provided a further £4.6m of capital so the company could 'expand the team further, roll out above-the-line advertising campaigns and start exploring new markets'.

In August 2015, following a complaint from a competitor, the Advertising Standards Authority found that the competitor "had been providing the same service since 2003", and therefore, the ASA "told Carwow not to claim that they were the first or only company to offer the advertised service."

In January 2016, Carwow raised a further £12.5m in a Series B funding round led by Accel Partners.

A £6m TV advertising campaign for Carwow was launched in December 2015, voiced by actor Michael Gambon.

In August 2019, Carwow announced a £25 million strategic funding round led by German car manufacturer Daimler (now Mercedes-Benz Group). Daimler executive Axel Harries will also sit on the Carwow board of directors.

In June 2021, Carwow acquired Wizzle, a consumer-to-business car-buying platform founded by entrepreneur Sebastien Duval. Wizzle was rebranded Sell Your Car, allowing Carwow to grow the business significantly by entering the used car market.

In 2022, Volvo Cars acquired a minority stake in the company.

In November 2022, Carwow cut nearly a fifth of its total staff due to economic concerns. Around 70 staff members were released across the UK, Spain and Germany.

As of 14 February 2025, Carwow has multiple YouTube channels in various languages, presented by Mat Watson (or Daniel Hohmeyer for the German channel), with a combined total of 10 million subscribers and over 4.5 billion views on the English main channel.

In 2022, ITV invested in a partnership with Carwow in return for advertising inventory across ITV’s channels and ITV Hub (now ITVX). ITV acquired a minority stake in Carwow, valued at £2.5 million in return for advertising inventory, as part of a media for equity scheme, with an option to invest a further £2.5 million.

In 2024, Carwow acquired Autovia, the publisher of former Dennis Publishing magazines Auto Express, Evo, DrivingElectric and Carbuyer.

In 2026, Carwow appointed a new chief technology officer (CTO) as it looks to improve its AI product innovation. Carwow also added a General Counsel to its executive team.
