= Morgan Midsummer =

2024 roadster by Morgan and Pininfarina

- A 2024 Midsummer on display.

Overview
- Manufacturer: Morgan Motor Company
- Production: 2024–present 59 units planned (50 roadsters and 9 coupés)
- Assembly: United Kingdom: Malvern, Worcestershire
- Designer: Pininfarina

Body and chassis
- Class: Barchetta
- Body style: 2-door roadster; 2-door coupé
- Layout: Front-engine, rear-wheel-drive
- Platform: CX-generation aluminum
- Related: Morgan Plus Six

Powertrain
- Engine: 3.0 L I6 - T (petrol)
- Transmission: 8-speed ZF 8HP automatic

Dimensions
- Length: 3,830 mm (150.8 in)
- Width: 1,650 mm (65.0 in)
- Height: 1,250 mm (49.2 in)
- Kerb weight: 1,000 kg (2,205 lb)

The Morgan Midsummer is a limited-production roadster manufactured by the Morgan Motor Company in collaboration with Italian design firm Pininfarina. Production began in 2024, with a total of only fifty units planned.

== History ==
In November 2023, the chief executive officer (CEO) of Morgan Motor Company announced a forthcoming collaboration with Pininfarina in a company press release. The Midsummer was officially unveiled on 16 May 2024, with Morgan confirming that production would be limited to fifty units. All vehicles were sold prior to the announcement of the pricing. In October 2024, Morgan announced the completion of the first two production models.

According to an interview with Pininfarina's chief creative officer (CCO), the partnership originated in 2022, when design teams from both companies met at a pub.

In June 2026, Morgan announced a coupé variant of the Midsummer, limited to just 9 cars. The coupé is technically identical to the roadster, it features different bodywork and dimensions.

=== Design ===
Most of the vehicle's bodywork is made of aluminum paneling with a wooden trim surrounding the cockpit. As a barchetta, the Midsummer lacks a roof and windscreen.

== Specifications ==
The Midsummer is built on the same CX-Generation aluminium platform used in the Morgan Plus Six.
