= Renault Mégane RS =

High performance version of the Renault Mégane

Renault Mégane Renault Sport
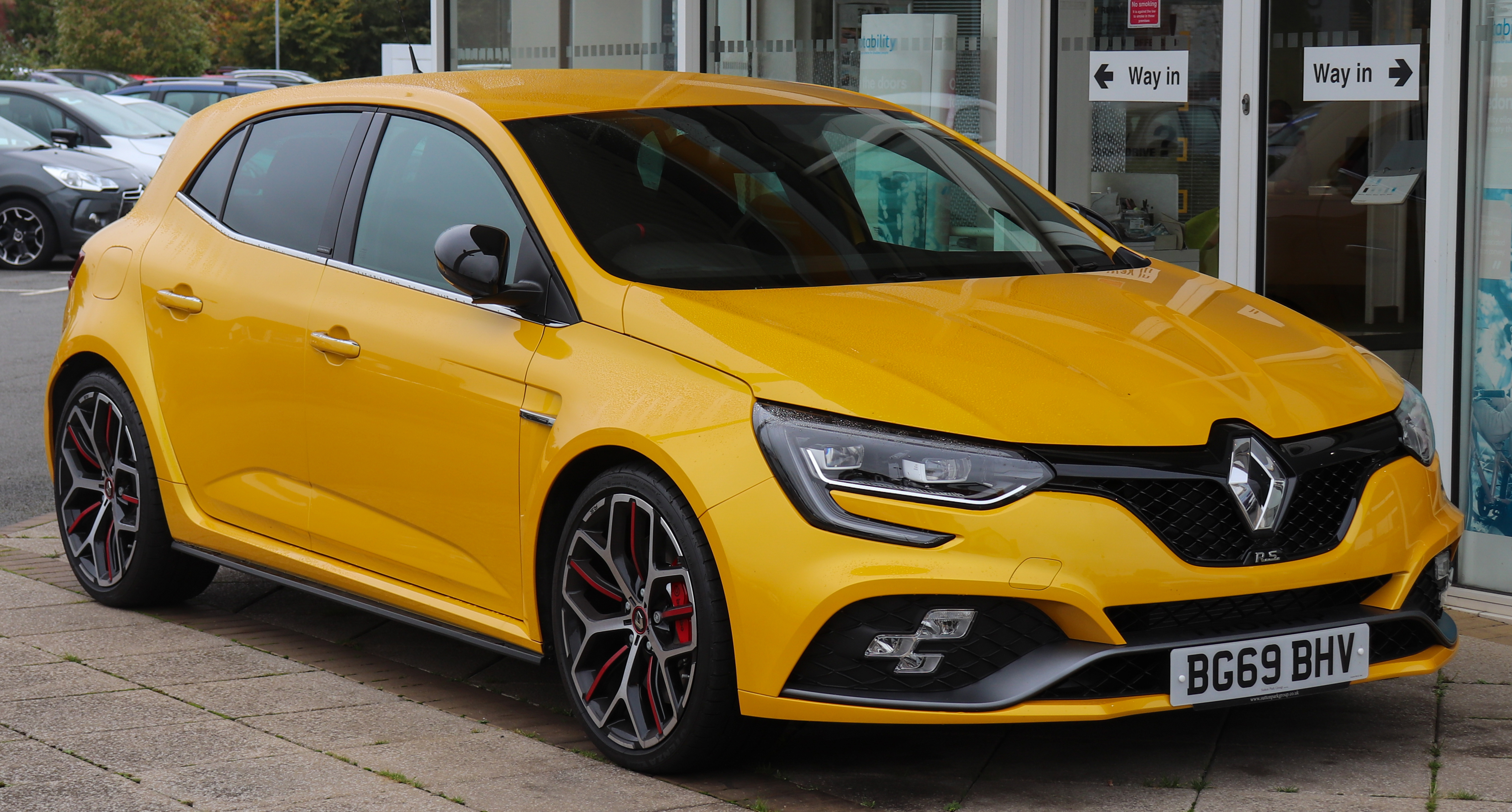

Overview
- Manufacturer: Renault Sport
- Production: 2004–2023

Body and chassis
- Class: Sport compact
- Body style: 3-door hatchback (2004–2016); 5-door hatchback (2004–2009, 2017–2023)
- Layout: Front-engine, front-wheel drive; Rear mid-engine, rear-wheel drive (Mégane Trophy only)
- Related: Renault Mégane

Chronology
- Predecessor: Clio V6 Renault Sport

The Renault Mégane Renault Sport (alternatively Renault Mégane RS) was a series of high-performance hatchback models based on the Renault Mégane, produced from 2004 by the high-performance subsidiary company Renault Sport for its parent company Alpine, a subsidiary of Renault, until December 2023. The Mégane RS won awards such as "Best hot hatch" from What car? (2010–2014), "Highest placed non-supercar" in Evo's annual Car of the Year test 2011 and "Best hot hatch" from Top Gear.

== Mégane Renault Sport I (based on Second generation Mégane; 2004–2009) ==
First generation
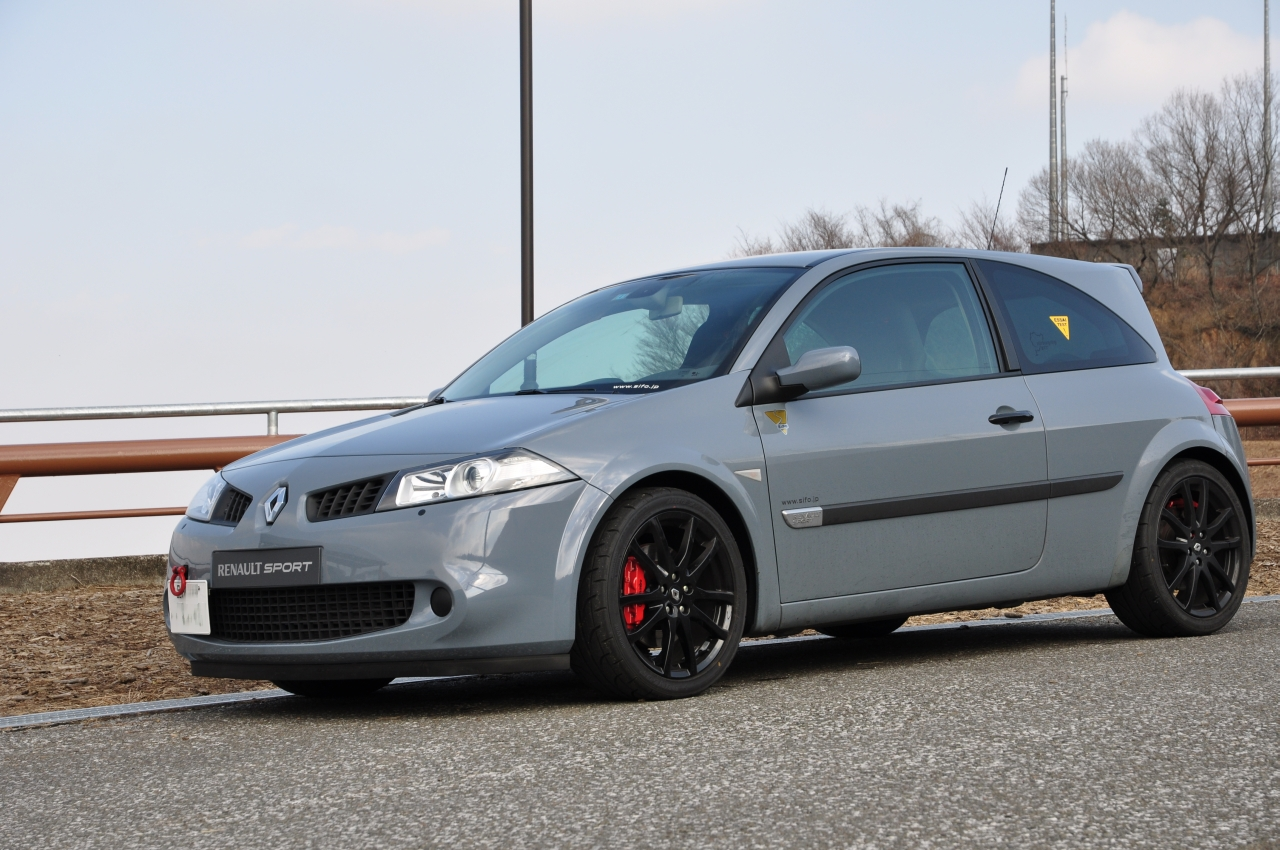
- Renault Mégane RS R26.R

Overview
- Production: 2004–2009
- Assembly: Spain: Palencia (Renault España); France: Dieppe (Alpine Cars)

Powertrain
- Engine: Petrol: 2.0-litre Renault F4RT turbocharged I4; 3.5-litre Nissan V4Y V6 (Mégane Trophy); Diesel: 2.0-litre Renault-Nissan Alliance M9R I4 (Facelift models)
- Transmission: 6-speed manual; 6-speed sequential manual (Mégane trophy)

Dimensions
- Wheelbase: 2,625 mm (103.3 in)
- Length: 4,228 mm (166.5 in)
- Width: 1,777 mm (70.0 in)
- Height: 1,437 mm (56.6 in)
- Kerb weight: 1,232–1,697 kg (2,716–3,741 lb)

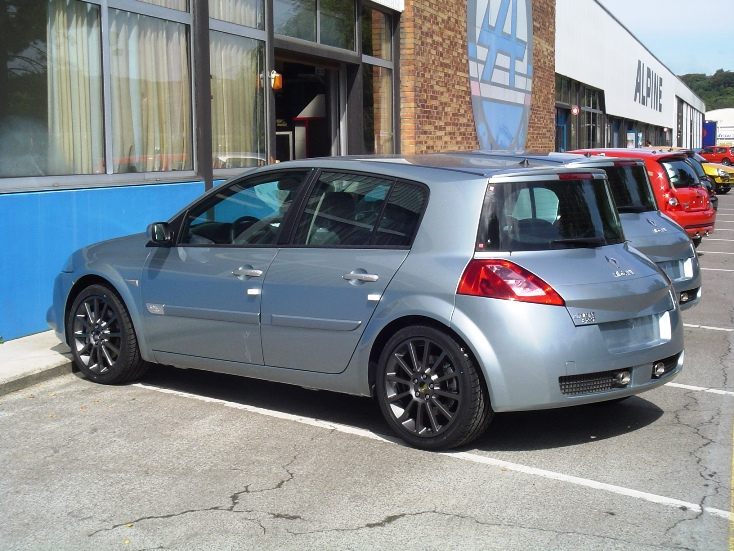
Rear view (5-door hatchback)

The first generation Mégane RS was introduced in September 2004 and is based on the Renault Mégane II small family car. The Mégane II RS was available in three-door and five-door hatchback versions, both with the same engine and was built at Renault's Dieppe factory by using body shells made in Palencia, Spain. The Mégane Renault Sport 225 uses double-axis strut suspension with independent steering axis at the front and an electric power steering.

=== Engine and performance ===
The RS uses a turbocharged 2.0-litre petrol engine that produces 225 PS (165 kW; 222 bhp), allowing the car to achieve 0–100 km/h in 6.5 seconds (0–60 mph in 6.5 seconds), with a top speed of about 240 km/h (149 mph). Ninety percent of the engine's torque is available from 2,000 rpm until redline. A twin-scroll turbocharger minimizes turbo lag, especially when throttle is applied at over 2,000 rpm. The turbocharge functions at 1,800 rpm. The transmission is a six-speed manual. Renault's claimed combined economy is 8.8 L/100 km (32 mpg_{‑imp}; 27 mpg_{‑US}).

In a 2004 road test by Mexican car magazine Automóvil Panamericano, the engine developed a peak output of 247 hp (184 kW; 250 PS).

=== Equipment ===
The Mégane Renault Sport has a speed-limiter, which prevents the car from passing a user-determined speed. It can be disabled or recalled with a button-press, and is set in the same way as the cruise control.

The Mégane RS is equipped with leather/cloth seats, seat belts with red stitching, 18-inch alloy wheels, dual sunroof, eight airbags and xenon headlights with headlight washers and Brembo brake discs.

Other features include automatic double optic headlights, 18-inch alloy wheels, air conditioning, ABS with EBD and electronic stability control.

The Lux models feature metallic paint, hands free Renault card, electronic folding mirrors, tyre pressure monitor, electronic front and rear windows, climate control, leather upholstery, 4x15W RDS radio with CD-MP3 player and 6 speakers, front carpet mats, electronic rear view mirror, rear spoiler (petrol engine models only) and 18-inch alloy wheels over the base model.

=== Renault Sport 225 Cup (2005–2009) ===
Introduced in 2005, the Megane Renault Sport 225 Cup includes the Cup Chassis option, which adds drilled brake discs, red front and rear brake calipers and increased brake master cylinder diameter, different 18-inch wheels plus revised stiffened steering. Other features include carbon grey interior upholstery with silver stitching.

The car is 10 kg (22 lb) lighter than the 225 Sport Hatch.

The handling improvements featured on the Cup were made to the standard Mégane, beginning in late 2005.

=== Facelift ===
The Mégane RS received a facelift in July 2006. The facelifted model introduced new safety features and minor exterior changes such as new tapered headlights, a revised front grille and bumpers along with translucent taillights.

=== Renault Sport 230 Renault F1 Team R26 (2006–2009) ===
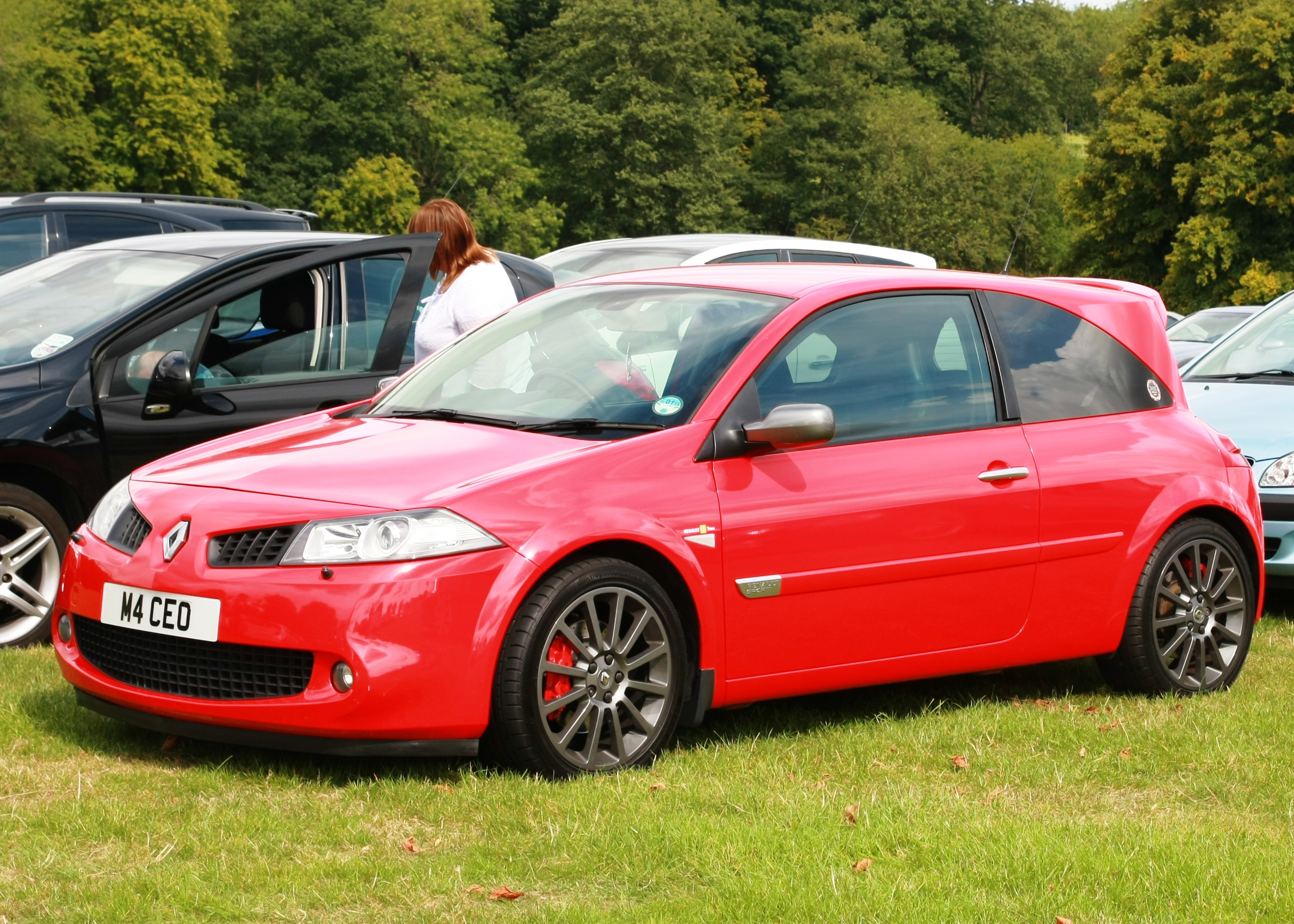
Renault Sport 230 Renault F1 Team R26

The Megane Renault Sport 230 Renault F1 Team R26 is a version that commemorates the success of Renault in the Formula 1 World Championship with the 2005 and 2006 Constructors' and Drivers' Championship titles and is named after the 2006 F1 car (R26). It is based on the facelifted Mégane RS.

The engine is rated at 227 hp (230 PS; 169 kW) at 5,500 rpm and 310 N⋅m (229 lb⋅ft) at 3,000 rpm. It incorporates the improved version of the Cup Chassis package now with a limited slip differential fitted for the first time in addition to 18-inch Anthracite spoked alloy wheels with Michelin Pilot Sport 2 235/40 R18 tires, Brembo front and rear red brake calipers and an increased brake master cylinder diameter, plus revised stiffened steering. Other features include a sport exhaust, Recaro seats, climate control, 4x15-watt RDS radio single CD/MP3 player with 6 speakers, Renault F1 decals, numbered plaque, limited slip differential and a rear spoiler. The car has a kerb weight of 1,355 kg (2,987 lb).

=== Renault Sport dCi 175 (2007–2009) ===
The Megane Renault Sport dCi 175 is a version with a 2.0-litre (1,997 cc) diesel engine. Engine is rated at 173 hp (129 kW; 175 PS) at 3,750 rpm and 360 N⋅m (270 lb⋅ft) at 2,000 rpm.

The Cup Chassis option (available for dCi 175 Lux) includes tyre pressure monitor deletion, 18-inch anthracite alloy wheels with 225/45R18 Continental SportContact 2 tires, retuned dampers and spring rates, disconnectable ESP and anthracite coloured door mirror housings.

The Sport Hatch version includes Recaro front seats, making the vehicle 20 kg (44 lb) lighter.

=== Renault Sport 230 Renault F1 Team R26.R (2009) ===
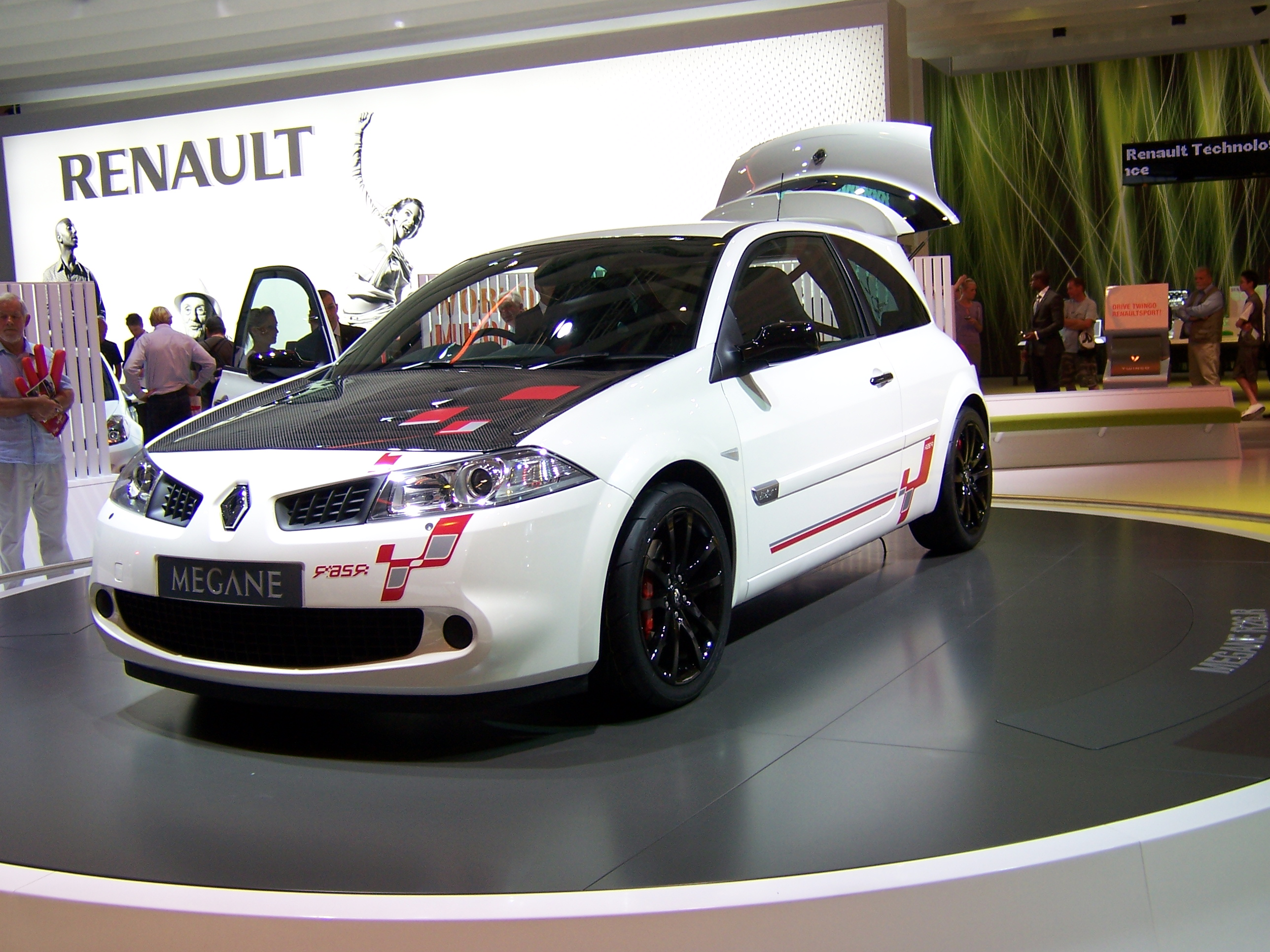
R26.R

The R26.R is based on the Mégane Renault Sport 230 F1 Team R26, but it is 123 kg (271 lb) lighter. Weight reduction is achieved via the removal of the rear seats and seat belts, passenger airbag and curtain airbags (the driver's airbag remains), climate control (air conditioning remains as standard), rear wash/wipe and heated rear window, front fog lamps, headlamp washers, radio/CD player and most of the soundproofing.

Other features include a carbon fibre bonnet, polycarbonate tailgate and rear side windows, Sabelt seats with carbon fibre shell and aluminium base, 6-point harnesses, a rear spoiler, optional roll cage and an optional titanium exhaust.

New parts include new front springs (14 mm/100 kg), new rear springs (16.2 mm/100 kg), recalibrated shock absorber settings, grooved brake discs, new alloy wheels are fitted with a different offset increasing the track by 4 mm (0.2 in), optional Toyo Proxes R888 225/40R18 tyres (Michelin Pilot Sport 2 235/40R18 standard) and stiffer lower arm bushes.

450 vehicles were made with 230 destined for the UK market. The car went on sale in October 2008 for £22,990. The car was unveiled at The 2008 British International Motor Show.

=== Safety ===
It received the first five-star Euro NCAP safety rating in the segment. The Renault Sport models include: six airbags, electronic stability control, traction control and a key-card in the centre console to reduce knee injury. The seatbelts feature pre-tensioners that will tighten the belts immediately after impact.

=== Renault Sport Mégane Trophy ===
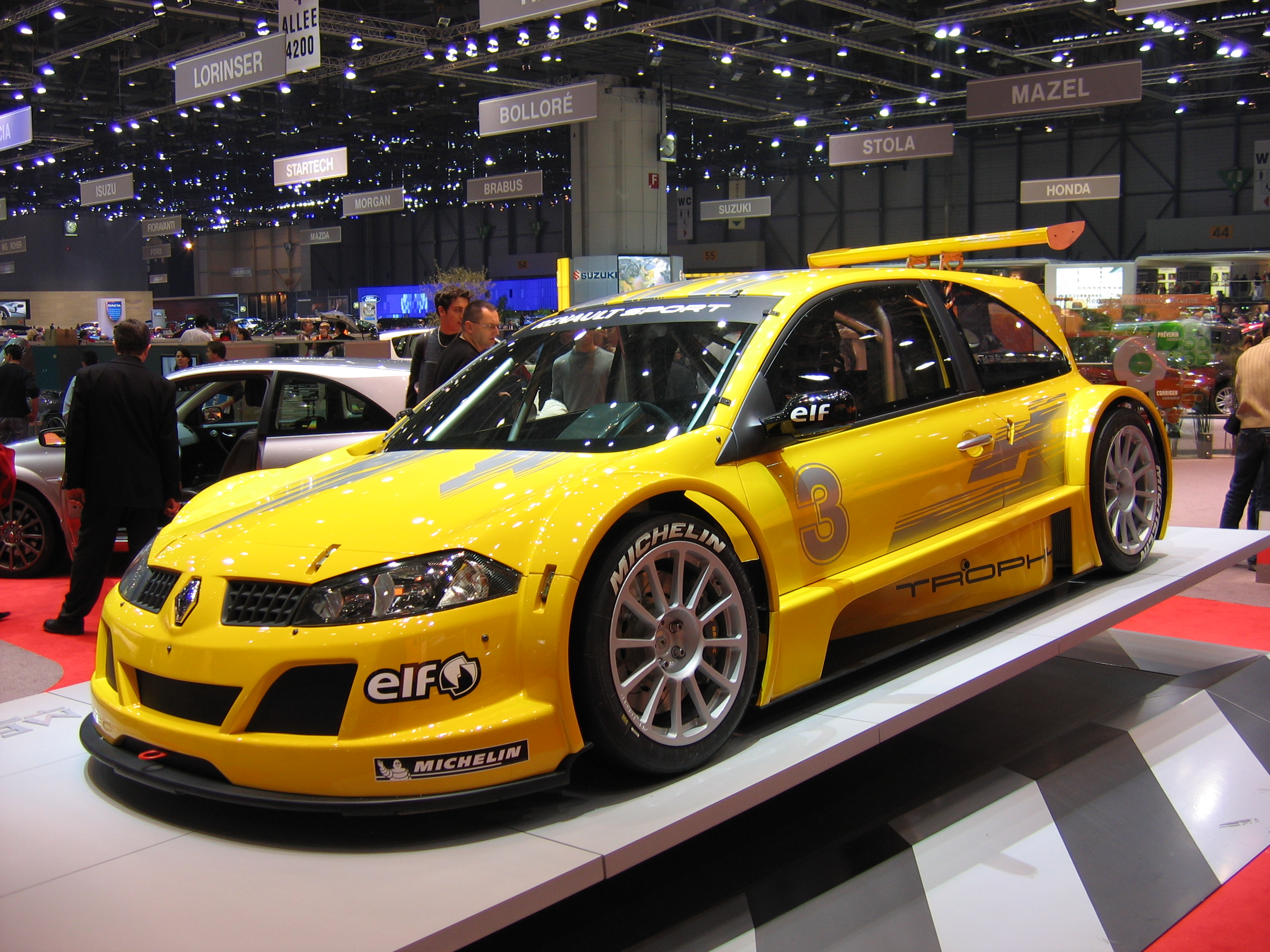
Renault Sport Mégane Trophy

The Renault Sport Mégane Trophy is a racing version of the Mégane RS, which includes a tube frame chassis with glass fibre body keeping just visual resemblance to the road legal Mégane. The RS Trophy uses the considerably modified Renault Vel Satis V4Y 3.5-litre V6 engine (which is a rebadged VQ35DE of the Nissan VQ engine family) featuring a dry sump lubrication system rated at 325 hp (242 kW; 330 PS) at 7,000 rpm and 390 N⋅m (288 lb⋅ft) at 4,500 rpm. The engine together with Sadev 6-speed sequential gearbox is placed longitudinally behind the cockpit.

The Renault Sport Mégane Trophy is not road legal and was intended to be used for competition only in the Renault Eurocup, but cars also race in events like the Belgian Touring Car Series and the Dubai 24 Hour.

The second generation was shown at the 2008 Paris Motor Show and was used in the Renault Eurocup starting from the 2009 season.

=== Engines ===
==== Road models ====
- 2004–2009 Mégane RS: 2.0 L turbocharged 16-valve I4, 225 PS (165 kW)
- 2006 Mégane RS 225 F1: 2.0 L turbocharged 16-valve I4, 225 PS (165 kW)
- 2006–2009 Mégane RS 230 Renault F1 Team R26: 2.0 L turbocharged 16-valve I4, 230 PS (169 kW)
- 2006–2009 Mégane RS dCi 175: 2.0 L turbocharged 16-valve I4, 173 PS (127 kW)
- 2009 Mégane RS R26.R: 2.0L turbocharged 16-valve I4, 230 PS (169 kW)

==== Race models ====
- 2005–2008 Mégane Trophy: 3.5 L 24-valve V6, 330 PS (243 kW)

== Mégane Renault Sport II (based on Third generation Mégane; 2010–2016) ==
Second generation
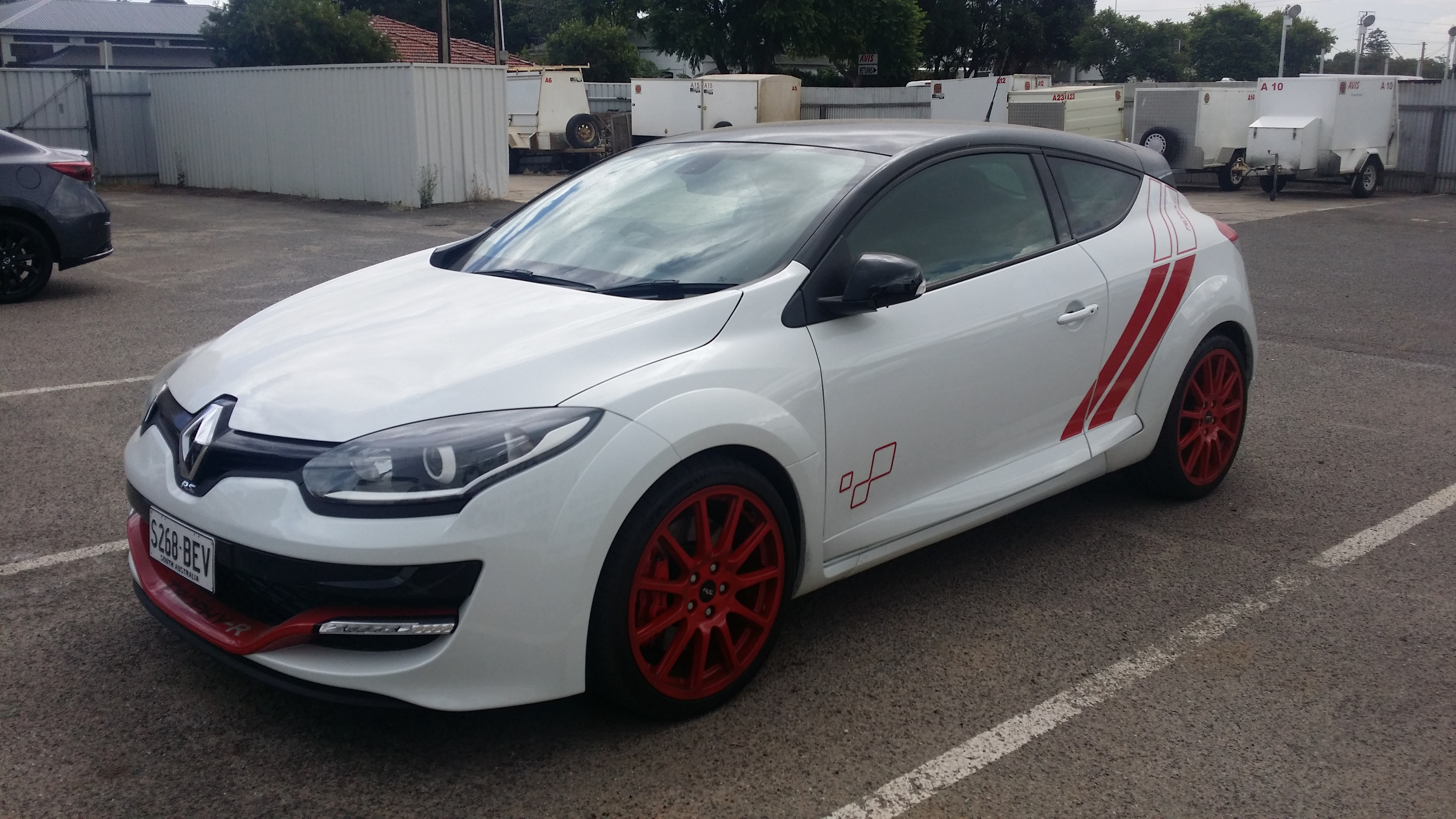
- Renault Mégane RS 275 Trophy R (post-facelift)

Overview
- Production: 2010–2016
- Assembly: Spain: Palencia; France: Dieppe

Powertrain
- Engine: Petrol: 2.0 L Renault Sport F4Rt turbo I4; 3.5 L Nismo V4Y V6 (Mégane Trophy)
- Transmission: 6-speed manual; 6-speed sequential manual (Mégane Trophy)

Dimensions
- Length: 4,299 mm (169.3 in)
- Width: 1,848 mm (72.8 in)
- Height: 1,435 mm (56.5 in)
- Kerb weight: 1,387–1,280 kg (3,058–2,822 lb)

=== Mégane Renault Sport 250 (2010) ===
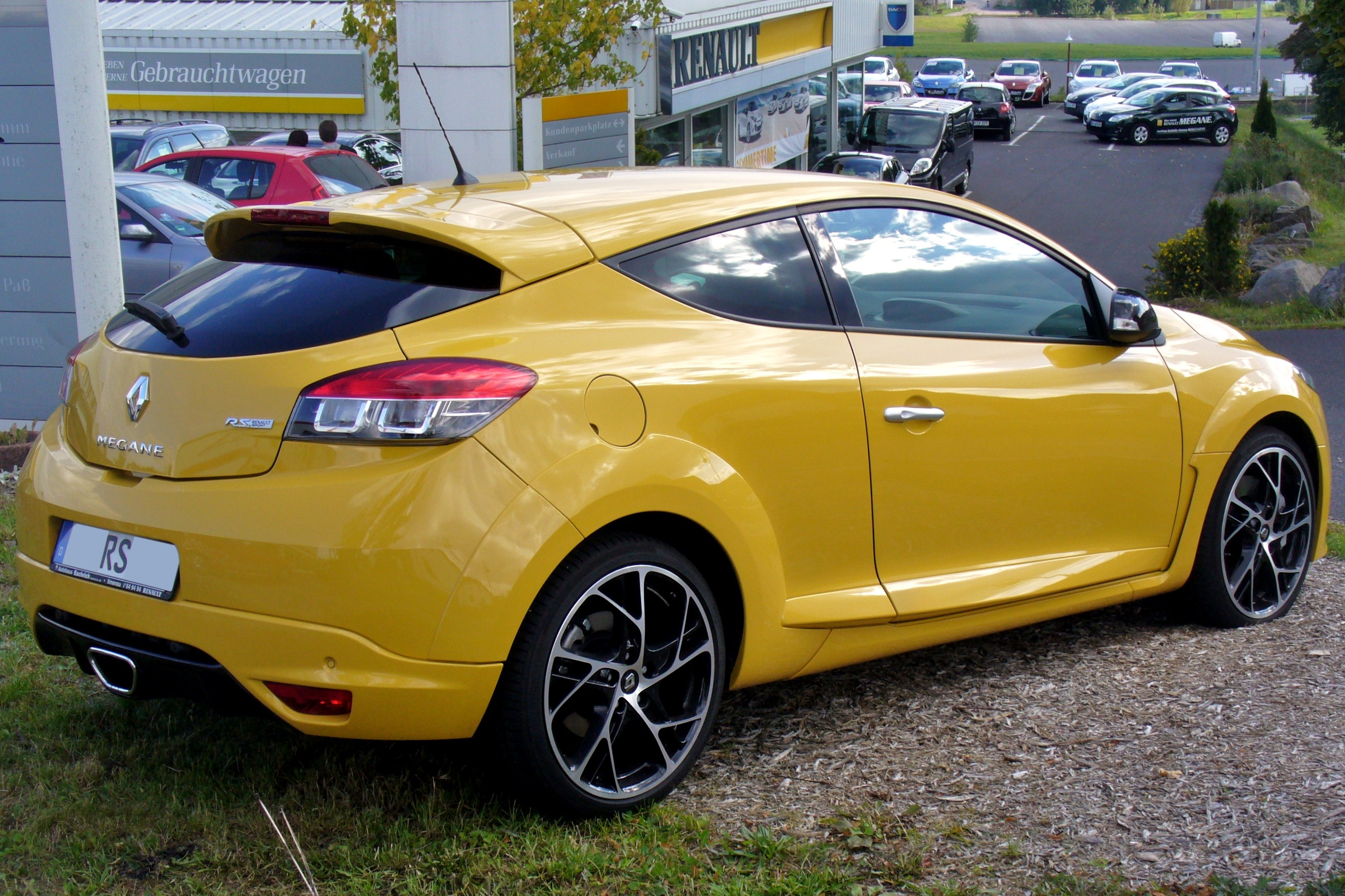
Rear view (pre-facelift)

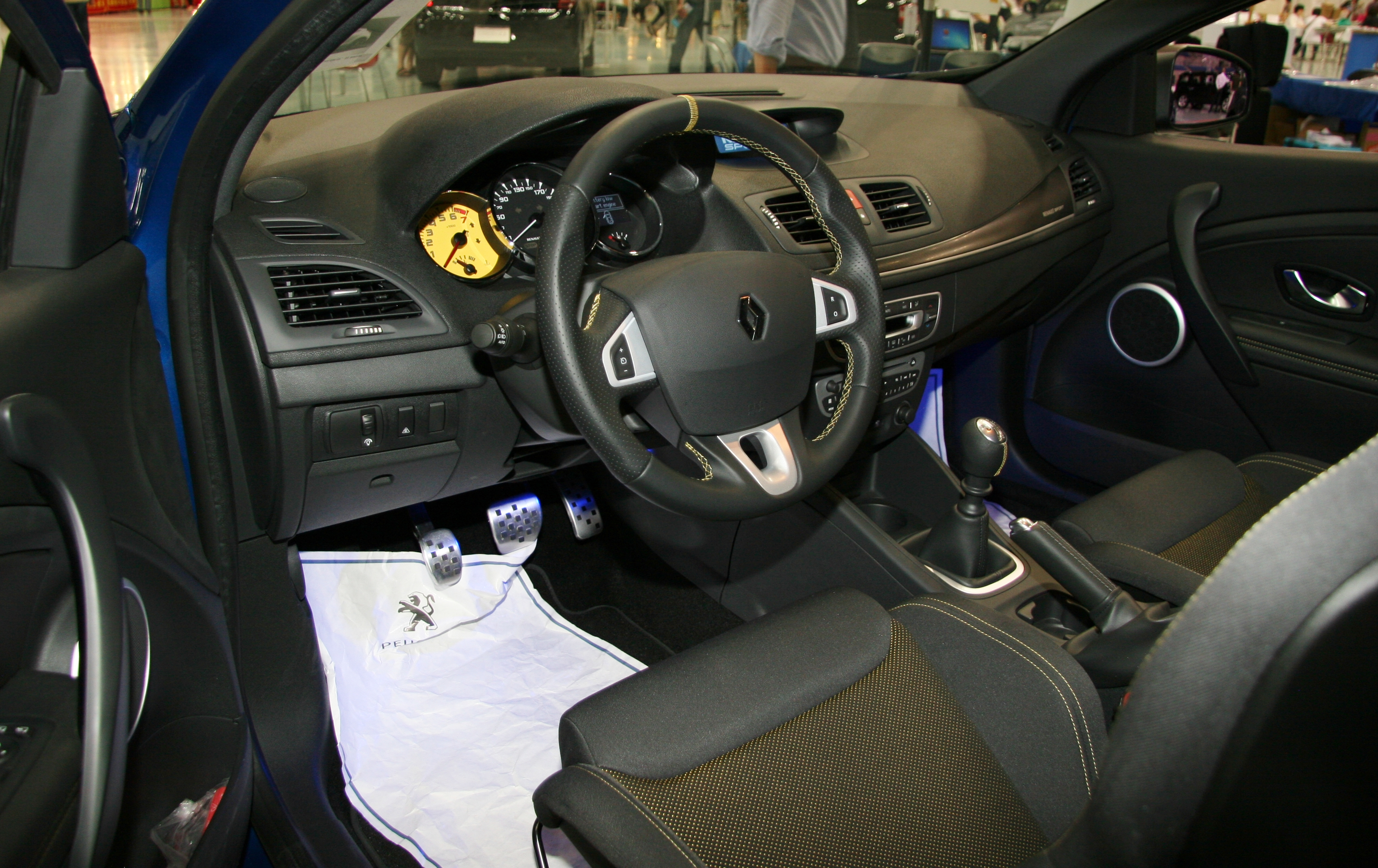
Interior

The Megane Renault Sport 250 features a 2.0-litre twin-scroll turbo 4-cylinder F4Rt engine rated at 247 bhp (184 kW; 250 PS) at 5,500 rpm and 340 N⋅m (251 lb⋅ft) of torque at 3,000 rpm with a 6-speed manual gearbox, Brembo front brakes, front splitter, extended sills and wheel arches, rear diffuser with central exhaust pipe, and 18-inch alloy wheels wearing 225/40R18 tyres. Aluminum pedals, a Renault Sport steering wheel with thumb grips, analog rev counter and sport seats with extra lateral complete the interior. Other features include front LED daytime running lights and bi-xenon headlights.

The 250 Cup variant contains a number of sharpened performance features including a stiffer chassis, track focused suspension, a limited slip differential and a slightly lighter gross weight. The Cup is differentiated visually with painted red brake calipers, instead of the silver calipers for the normal Sport. 18x8.25" "Ax-l" alloy wheels are fitted with wider 235/40R18 tyres, while 19x8.25" "Steev" wheels were available as an option with 235/35R19 tyres.

In Australia, the Megane R.S. was only sold in Cup form, though the features resemble that of the luxury model sold in Europe with the only options being front parking sensors and bi-xenon directional headlights. A Cup Trophée model was offered above that, which included a number of extra inclusions like fabric Recaro Sportster CS seats, proximity key replacing remote key, tyre pressure monitoring, upgraded stereo, grey body highlights instead of black (except for Lunar Grey), electrically folding mirrors, and the 19-inch Steev wheels. 18-inch Ax-l wheels and black body highlights were available as no-cost options. Leather Recaro seats, xenons headlamps and front parking sensors were available at additional cost.

The second generation Mégane Renault Sport 250 was unveiled at the 2009 Geneva Motor Show.

=== Mégane R.S. 265 Trophy (2011) ===
In June 2011, Renault Sport unveiled a limited edition variant of the Mégane III R.S. called the Mégane R.S. 265 Trophy. The Megane R.S. 265 Trophy uses the same 2.0-litre four-cylinder engine as the standard R.S. but due to modifications such as a new air intake and higher turbo pressure (from 1.15 to 1.35 bar (16.7 to 19.6 psi)) it gains an extra 15 hp, increasing the power output to 261 bhp (195 kW; 265 PS) and 360 N⋅m (266 lb⋅ft) of torque. The car can accelerate from 0–100 km/h in six seconds and goes on to a top speed of 254 km/h (157 mph). It is recognizable from a model-specific decoration such as Trophy stickers on the doors, a new spoiler and specific 19″ rims with R.S. center caps. It comes in a model-specific metallic yellow (Jaune Sirius) but is also available in more low-key colors such as white (Blanc Glacier), black (Noir Étoilé) and gray (Gris Cassiopée).

The Mégane R.S. 265 Trophy set a Nurburgring laptime of 8 minutes and 8 seconds, beating the record previously held by the Mégane R26.R by 9 seconds.

Production was limited to 500 units.

=== Renault Sport Mégane R.S. 265 (2012–2013) ===
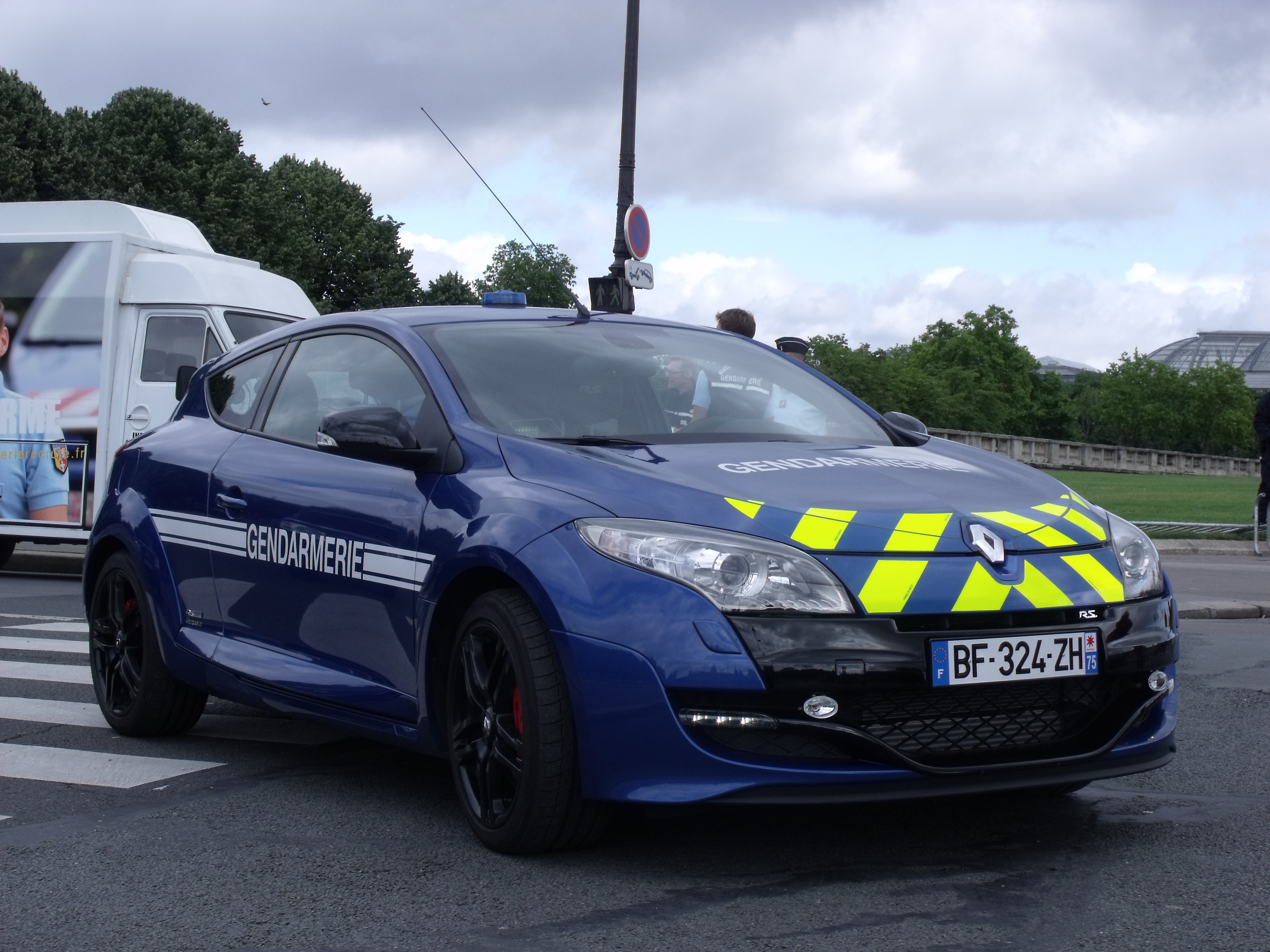
The Mégane R.S. 265 in use of the Gendarmerie Nationale (French National Police)

Renault introduced the updates on the Trophy model to the standard Megane R.S. in 2011 replacing the Mégane R.S. 250. The car was a result of Renault winning a tender from the Gendarmerie National for a new high speed pursuit vehicle with a power output requirement of 261 bhp. In addition to supplying the updated car to the police, Renault introduced it for the general public as well.

The car retained the updated engine from the Trophy version rated at 261 bhp (195 kW; 265 PS) and offers the same "Cup" and "Sport" versions like the Mégane R.S. model. Changes include Piano Black interior highlights and wider LED daytime running lights with 6 LEDs per side rather than the 3 LEDs found in the RS250. The 18" wheels were changed to a new design called "Tibor", while the 19" wheels carried over from the 250. Extreme Blue and Sport Yellow were dropped as colour options.

The new exterior package introduced on the 265 was the 'Red Design Pack' which includes red striping on front blade, rear diffuser and side protection mouldings, rear parking camera with front parking sensors, Visio System lane departure warning and auto high/low beam headlights.

The Cup Chassis Pack available on the 265 consists of 18-inch matt black alloys with 235/40 R18 95Y Michelin Sport 2 tyres, slotted brake discs, limited slip differential, red brake calipers, stiffer springs/dampers and anti-roll bars.

In Australia, the Cup and Cup Trophée models were replaced with the Cup, Cup+ and Trophy+ with slightly more flexible specification levels.

=== Red Bull RB7 and RB8 Edition (2012–2013) ===
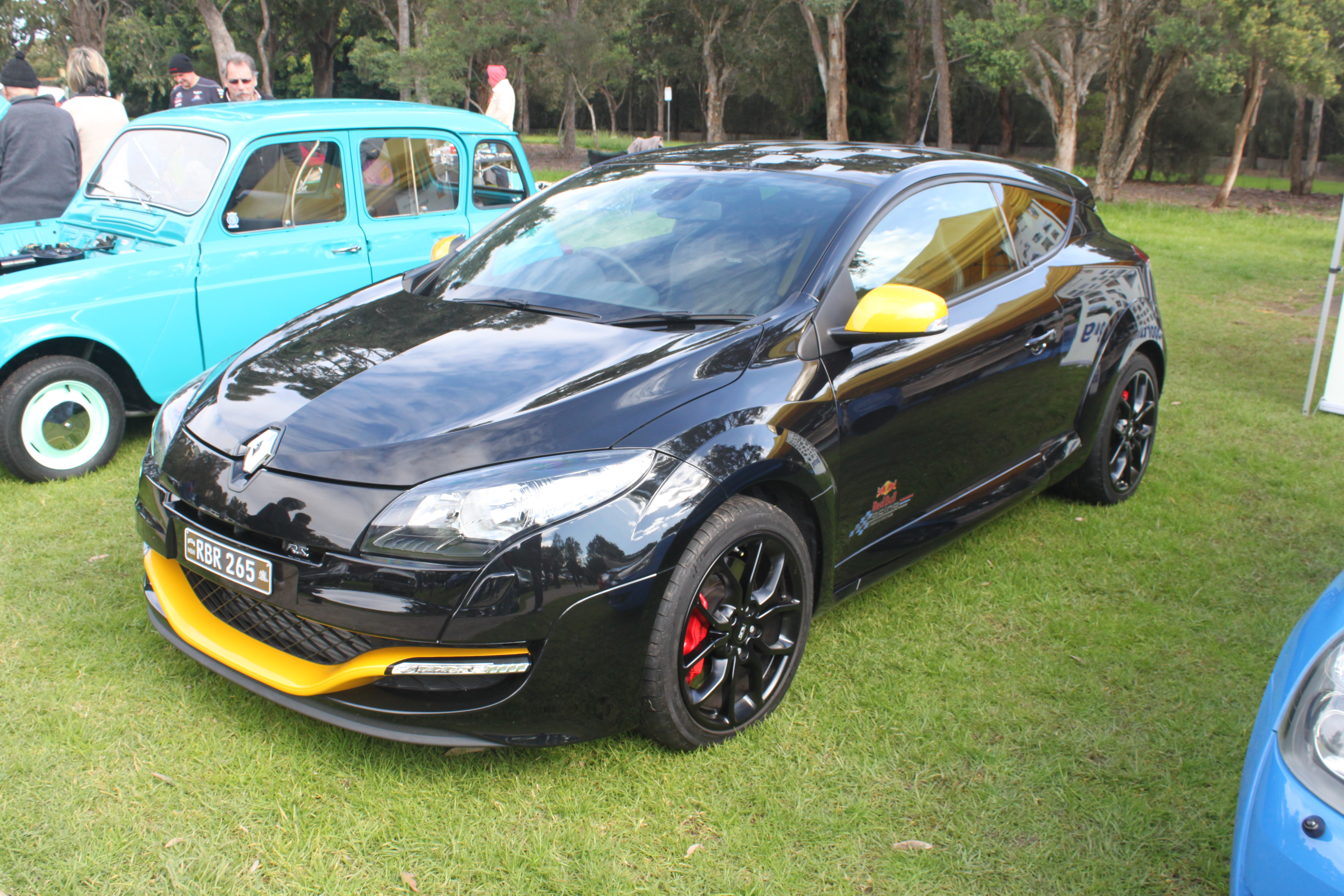
Renault Sport Mégane 265 Cup Red Bull RB7 Edition

The Red Bull RB7 and RB8 Editions were based on the Mégane R.S. 265 Cup trim and was unveiled in 2012 and 2013 respectively to celebrate the wins of the Renault Red Bull F1 team. The models featured various optional equipment as standard along with unique Etoilé Black body colour (for the RB7) with yellow trim pieces and Twilight Blue exterior colour with silver trim pieces (for the RB8). Other features include Red Bull decals (with additional chequiered flag decal for the RB7 Edition), 19-inch Steeve wheels, red Brembo brake calipers, limited slip differential, Bridgestone Potenza tyres, leather Recaro bucket seats and a Renault Sport monitor which displays vital track day information G-Force and laptime data. Production of the RB7 was limited to 522 units of which 51 were destined for the Australian market while production of the RB8 was limited to 120 units of which 30 were destined for the UK market.

=== Facelift (2014–2017) ===
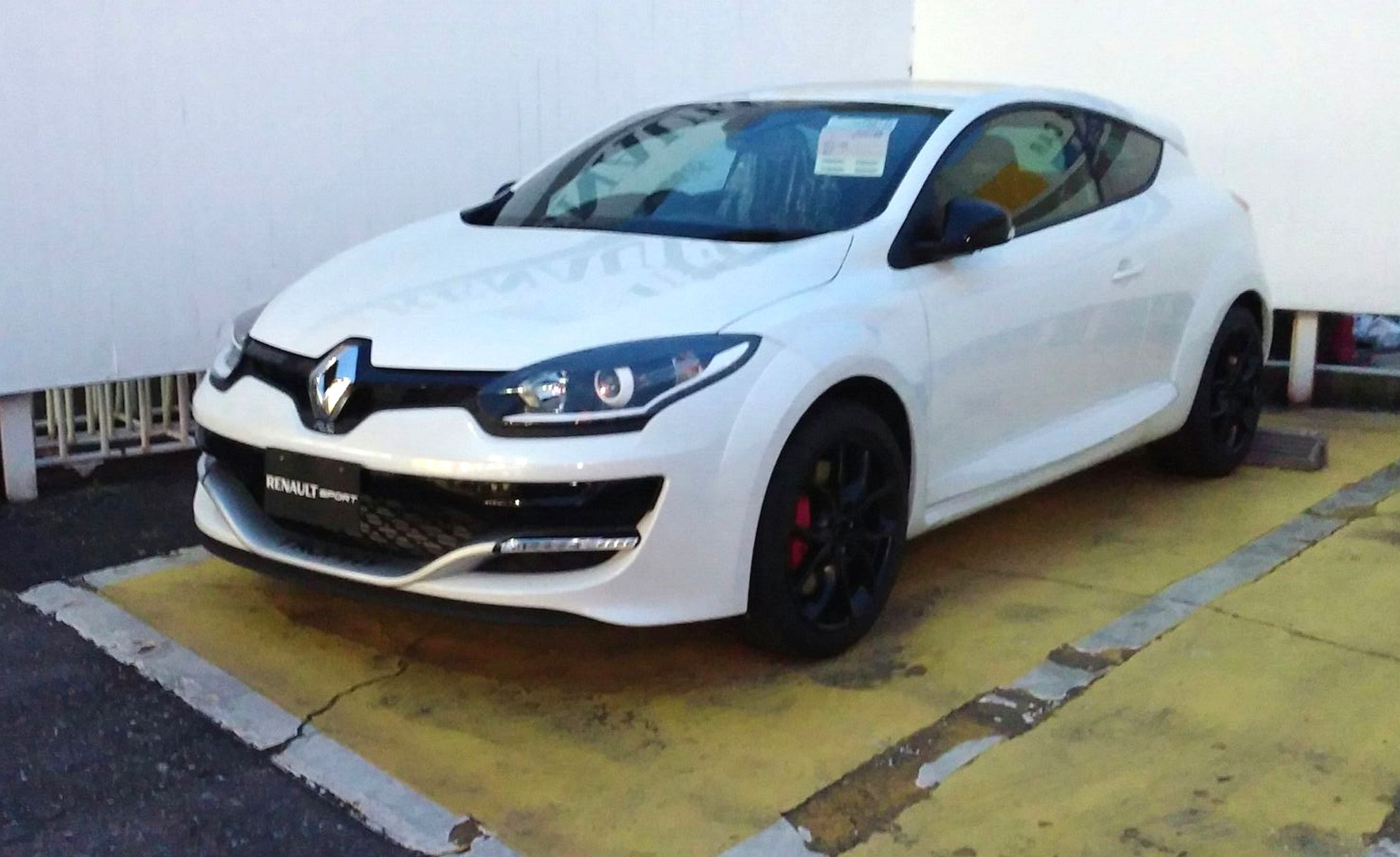
Renault Mégane R.S. (post-facelift)

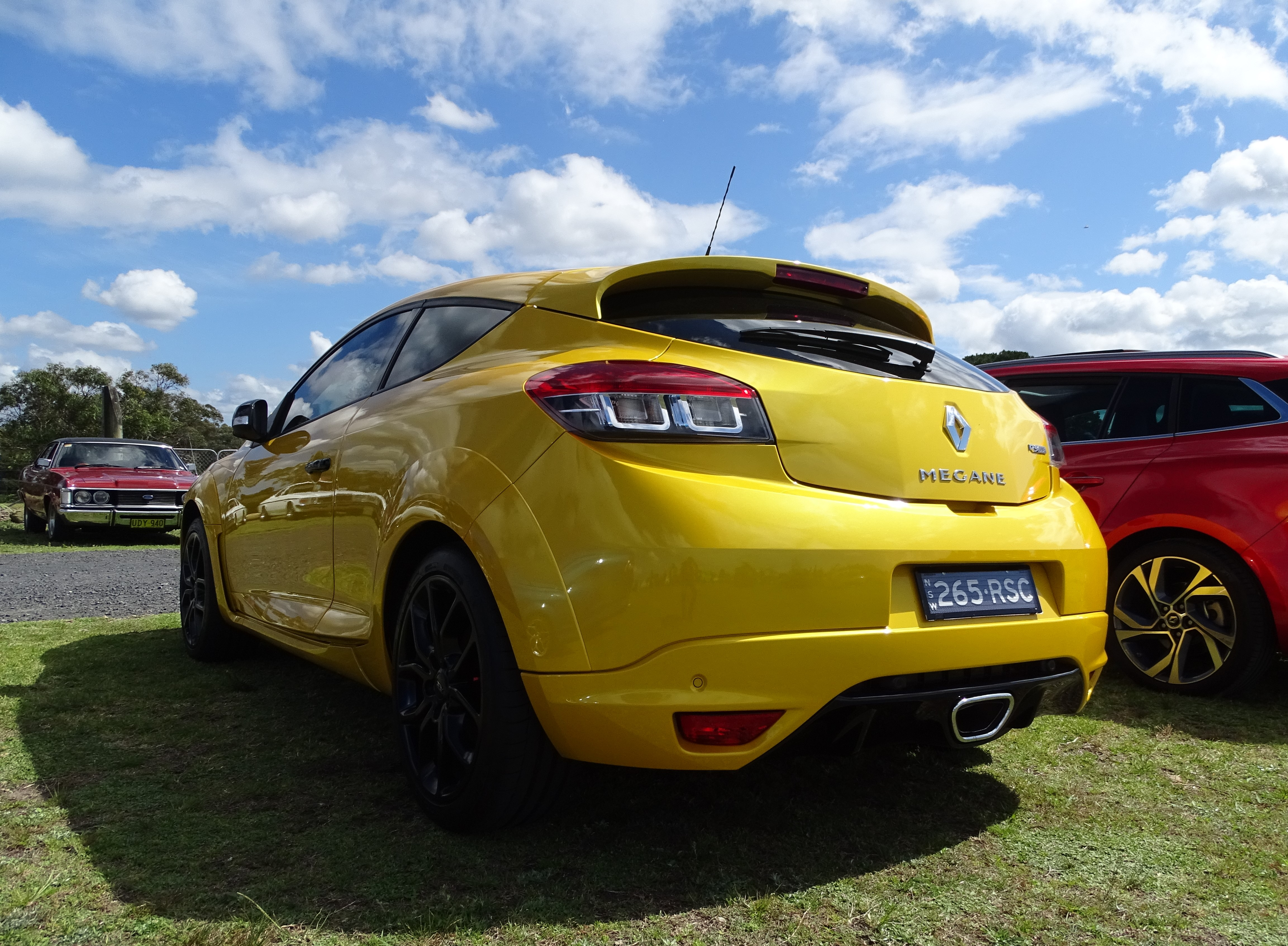
Rear view (post-facelift)

The Mégane R.S. received a facelift in 2014 featuring design cues from the rest of the Renault lineup at the time. Exterior changes include a new front grille with a pronounced Renault badge, revised front and rear bumpers, revised headlights and a new hood. The car was only available in a single trim with an optional cup chassis package which included limited slip differential and a firmer suspension setup. Interior updates included Renault's R-Link infotainment system which was criticised for its joystick control. No mechanical changes were made in the facelift.

=== Renault Sport Mégane 275 Trophy & Trophy-R (2014–2017) ===
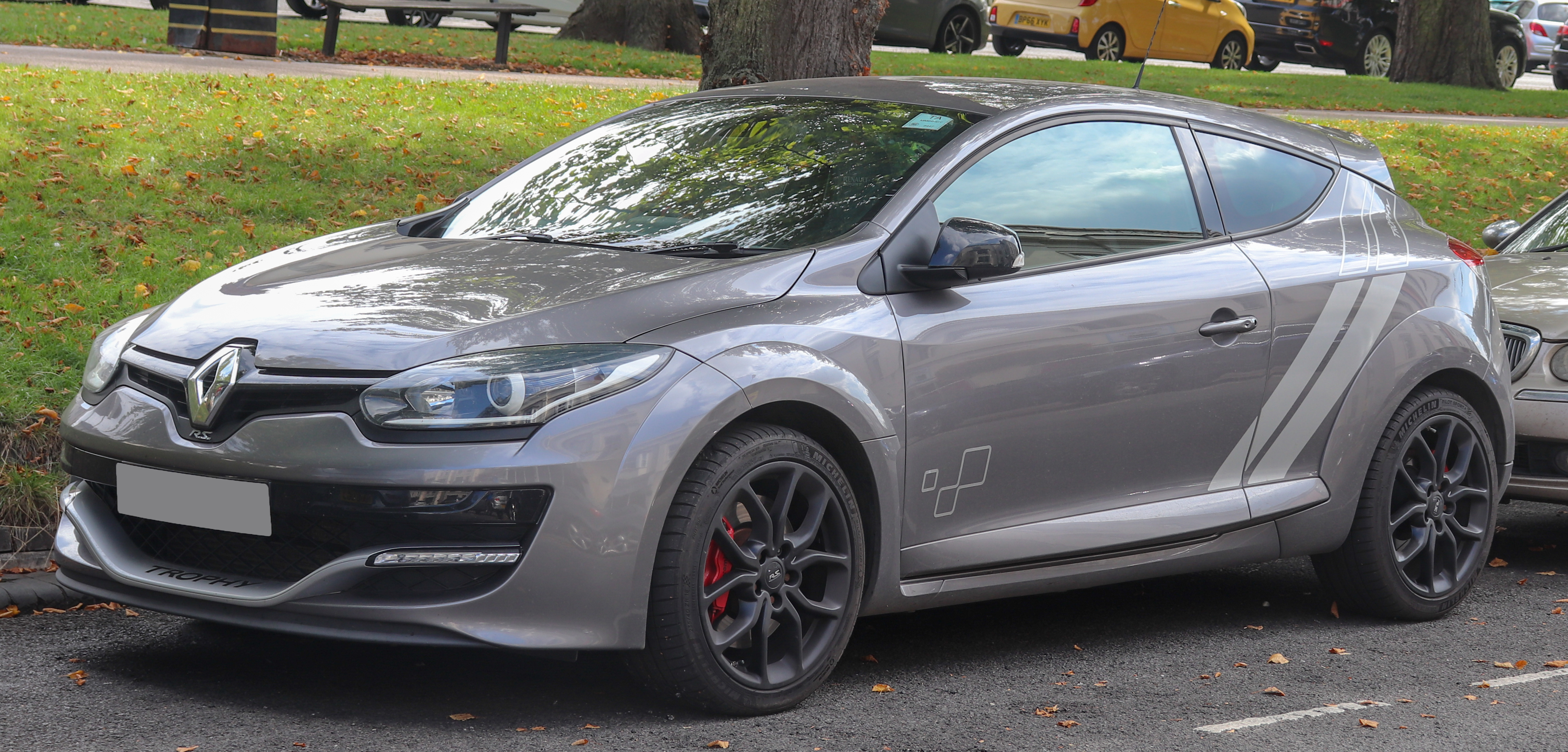
Renault Mégane R.S. 275 Trophy

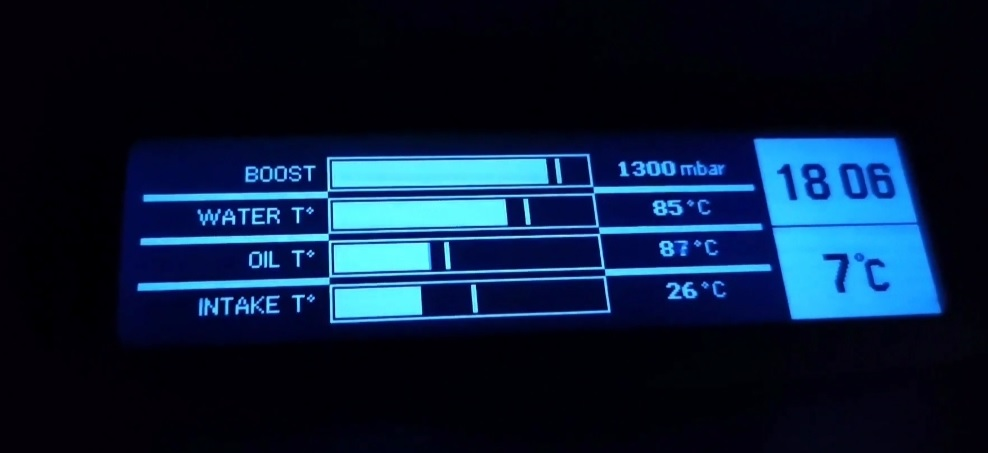
R.S. monitor

In response to SEAT setting a new record for a Front-wheel drive production car at the Nürburgring race track with the Leon Cupra 280 at 7:58.4, Renault developed the 275 Trophy-R to retake the title a few weeks after. With Laurent Hurgon driving, the record was reclaimed with a Nürburgring lap time of 7:54.36. The Mégane R.S. 275 Trophy-R features an Akrapovič titanium exhaust system increasing the power output to 271 bhp (201 kW; 273 PS) at 5,500 rpm while the torque is unchanged at 360 N⋅m (266 lbf⋅ft) at 3,000 rpm. Other changes include Öhlins dampers with Allevard composite coil springs and 19-inch Speedline Turini wheels with Michelin Pilot Sport Cup 2 tyres. A lithium battery results in additional weight saving of 16 kg. The front brakes are changed to a 350mm 2 piece floating rotor (up 10mm) while using the same calipers and rear brakes. On the interior, the sound deadening is removed, as well as the air conditioning, stereo, sat nav and back seats in place of which a rear brace is fitted in place. The front seats are Recaro "pole position" fixed polycarbonate bucket seats trimmed with leather and Alcantara with Sabelt race harness belts fitted. The total weight saving of all the changes amounts to a 101 kg (223 lb) loss, bringing kerb weight down to 1,280 kg (2,820 lb), 7.5 L/100 km (38 mpg_{‑imp}; 31 mpg_{‑US}) and 174 g/km of CO_{2}/km. The Mégane R.S. 275 Trophy-R also set new track records of several others circuits such as the Suzuka circuit, Fuji International Speedway and the Tsukuba circuit.

==== Australian special editions ====
2011 Monaco Grand Prix Limited Edition – This model was limited to 50 units and came in a Pearlescent White exterior colour with Piano Black accents on the side mirrors, rear diffuser and fog-lamp surrounds. Other exterior features include a panoramic roof, 19-inch wheels, red Brembo brake calipers, and bixenon directional headlamps. On the interior, it featured a black and white leather upholstery with white trim on the centre console, dashboard and door handles. The seat and the floor mats feature special Monaco GP stitching.

2012 Australian GP Edition – This model featured a gloss black exterior colour with matching 19-inch Steev alloy wheels along with contrasting red Brembo brake calipers. Other exterior features include a fixed glass roof and bixenon headlights. On the interior, the car features black leather Recaro bucket seats, satellite navigation system with 3D audio player, climate control and a special plaque signifying the build number of the car. Production was limited to 50 units and the car went on sale in March 2012.

2012 Trophy 8:08 – Based on the Mégane R.S. 265, this model was limited to 100 units. It was built to cebrate Renault's lap record at the Nurburgring and only came in Liquid Yellow and Pearl White exterior colours. Other changes included 19-inch gloss black alloy wheels with red rim, leather trimmed Recaro front bucket seats and Bridgestone Potenza RE050A tyres also used by record setting car.

2014 R.S. Sport Limited Edition – The R.S. Sport Limited Edition was launched in March 2014 and was limited to 50 units. It is based on the Mégane R.S. Sport package which does not have limited slip differential. The engine is the same 2.0-litre four cylinder unit as present in other variants of the Mégane R.S. but was equipped with a start/stop system for increased fuel efficiency. The interior was equipped with basic features such as cloth seats, manual air conditioning, parking sensors and Bluetooth phone connectivity along with six airbags. The variant also features Renault Sport Monitor System which lets the driver choose between various driving modes with additional settings for throttle response. The R.S. Sport Limited Edition was available in an exclusive Pacific Blue exterior colour along with silver 18-inch alloy wheels.

=== Variants ===
Petrol engine
Model	Displacement	Type code	Power	Torque	Top speed	0–100 km/h (0–62 mph) (s)
2.0 Turbo RS 250	1,998 cc (121.9 cu in)	F4RT	250 PS (184 kW; 247 bhp) at 5,500 rpm	340 N⋅m (251 lb⋅ft) at 3,000 rpm	250 km/h (155 mph)	6.1
2.0 Turbo RS 265	1,998 cc (121.9 cu in)	F4RT	265 PS (195 kW; 261 bhp) at 5,500 rpm	360 N⋅m (266 lb⋅ft) at 3,000 rpm	255 km/h (158 mph)	6.0
2.0 Turbo RS 275 Trophy	1,998 cc (121.9 cu in)	F4RT	273 PS (201 kW; 271 bhp) at 5,500 rpm	360 N⋅m (266 lb⋅ft) at 3,000 rpm	255 km/h (158 mph)	6.0
2.0 Turbo RS 275 Trophy-R	1,998 cc (121.9 cu in)	F4RT	273 PS (201 kW; 271 bhp) at 5,500 rpm	360 N⋅m (266 lb⋅ft) at 3,000 rpm	255 km/h (158 mph)	5.9

=== Motorsports ===
==== Mégane Trophy ====
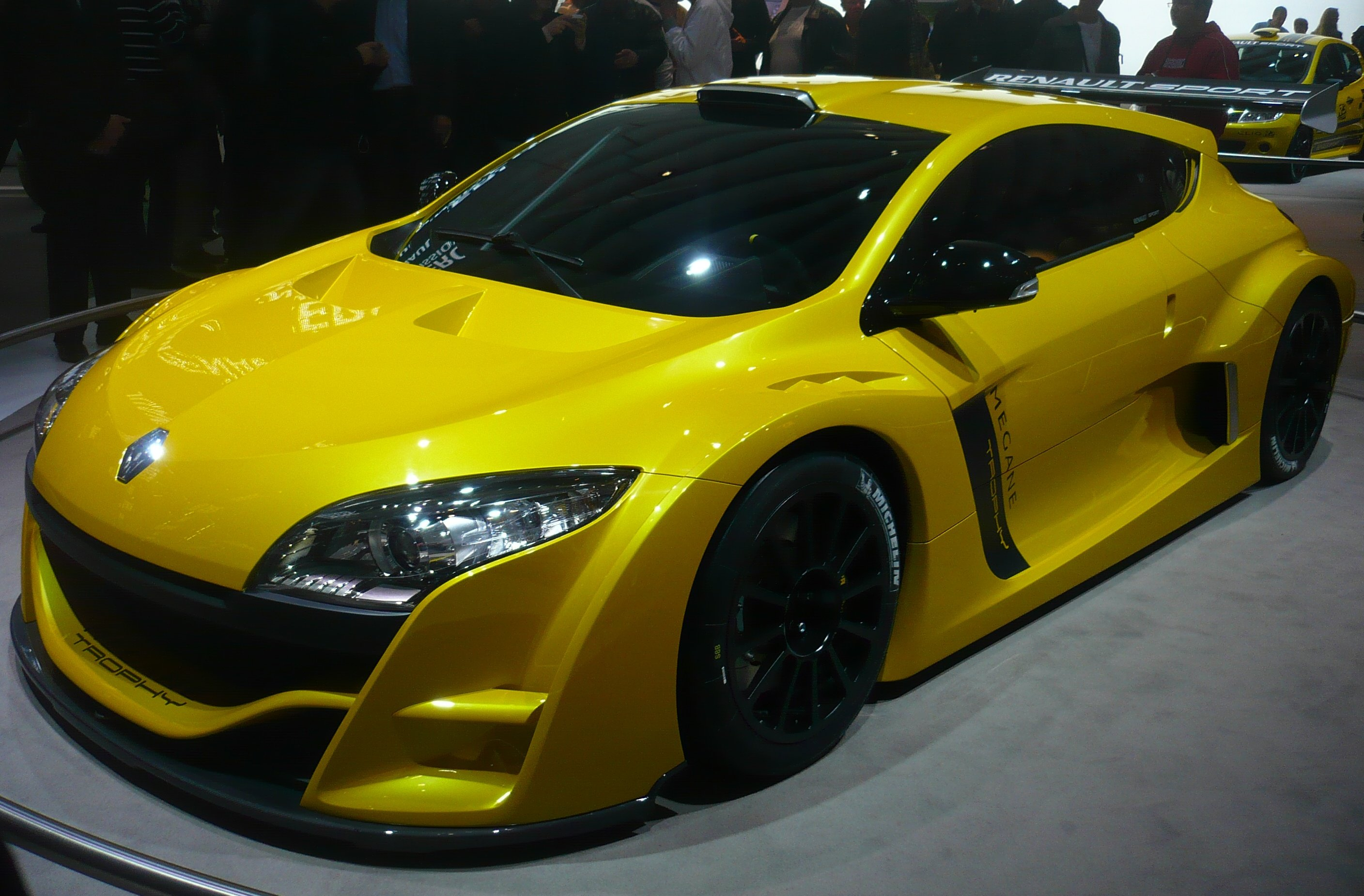
Renault Mégane Trophy

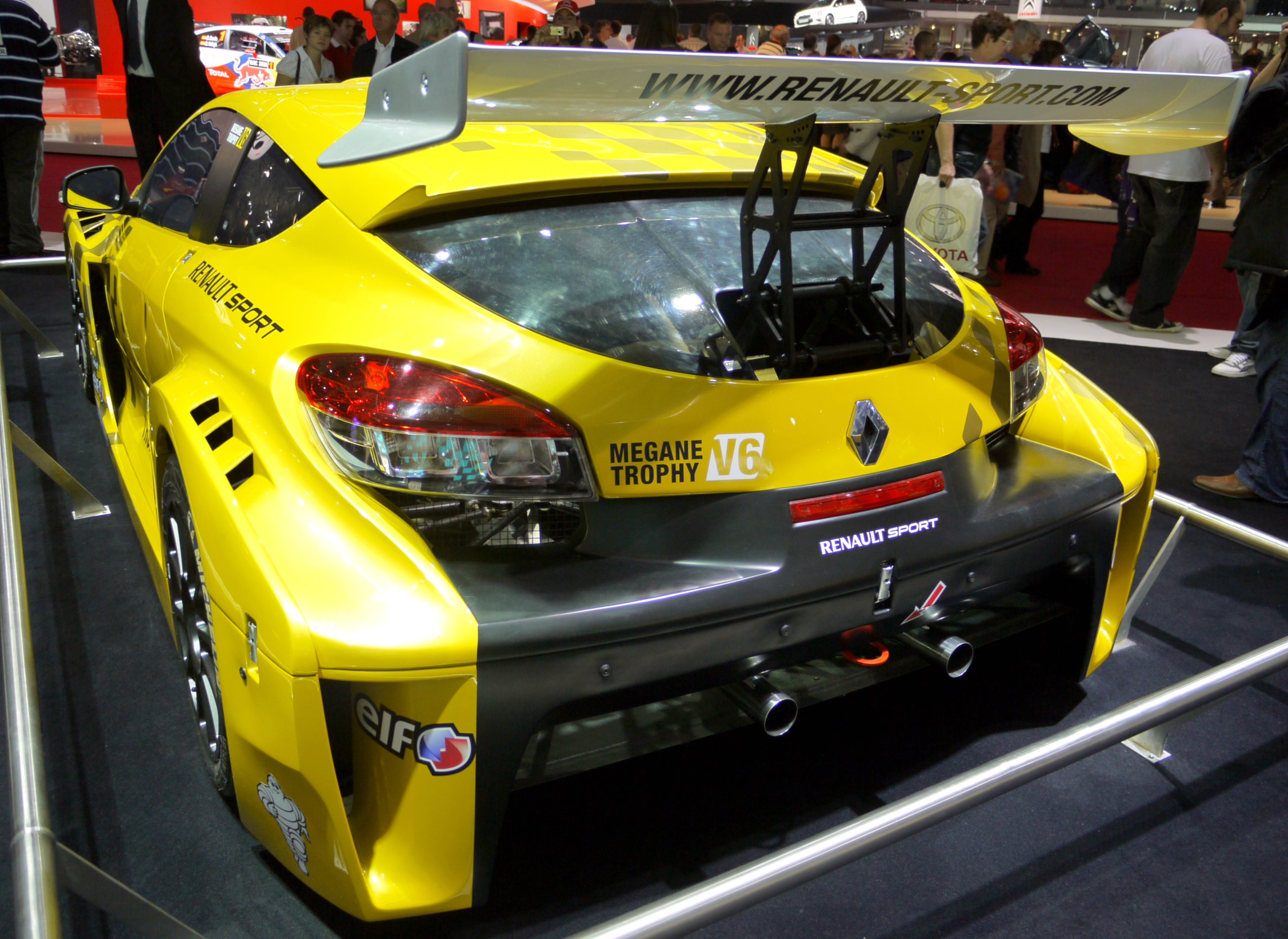
rear view

The Mégane Trophy based on the second generation Mégane R.S. Trophy was unveiled in 2009, sharing only visual appearance with its road legal counterpart. The car was destined to compete in the European Mégane Trophy race series for privateer race teams.

The Trophy features a composite body with a space frame chassis and a mid-mounted 3.5-litre Nissan-Renault V6 engine rated at 326 hp (243 kW; 331 PS) and 390 N⋅m (288 lb⋅ft) mated to a 6-speed sequential transmission driving the rear wheels. The suspension system has full adjustable dampers. The only resemblance to the road car are the headlights and taillights along with the windscreens. The composite body and other weight saving measures result in a dry weight of 980 kg (2,161 lb).

== Mégane Renault Sport III (based on Fourth generation Mégane; 2017–2023) ==
Third generation
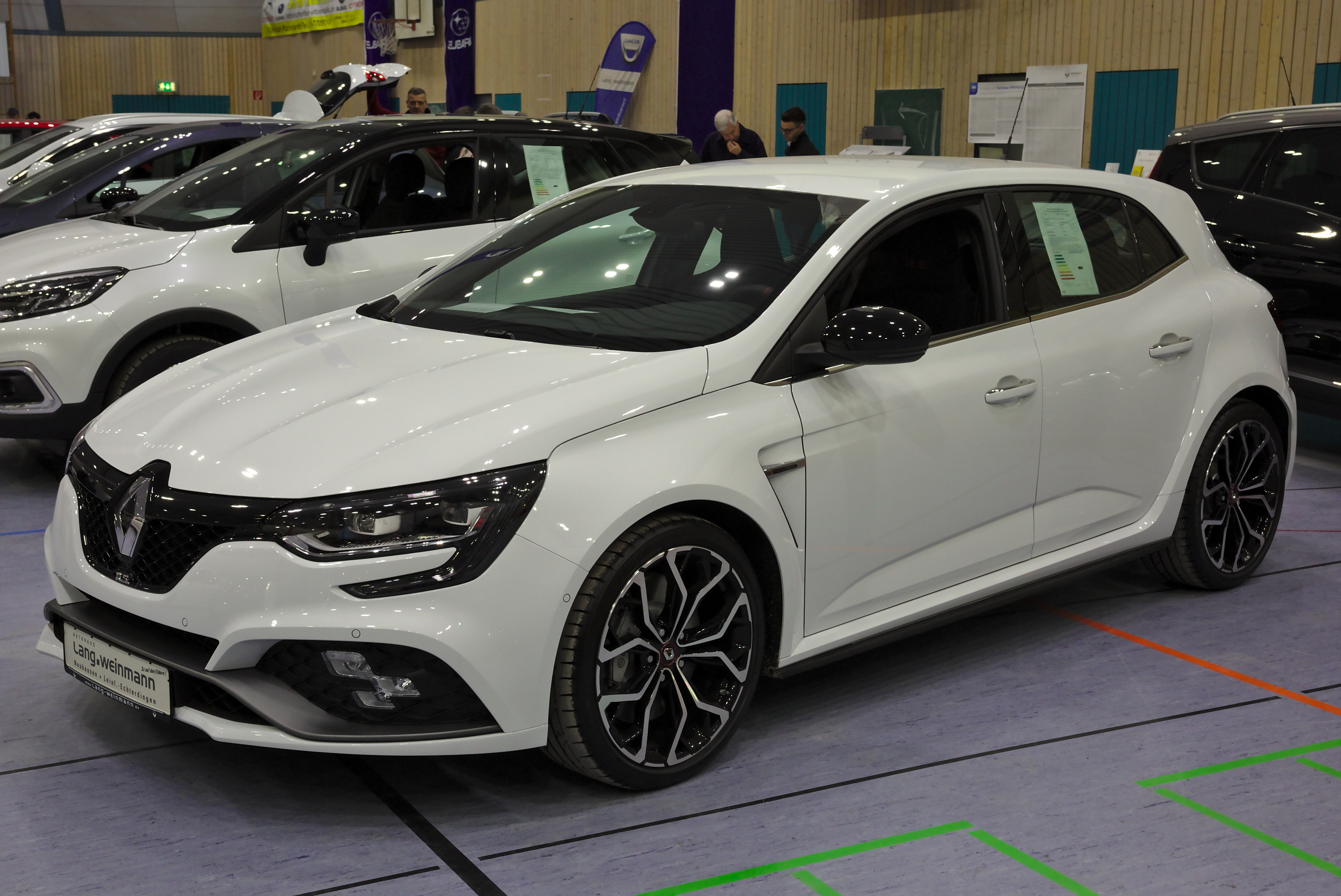
- Renault Mégane R.S. 280 Cup

Overview
- Production: 2017–2023
- Assembly: Palencia, Spain

Powertrain
- Engine: Petrol: 1.8 litres (110 cubic inches) turbocharged Nissan MR18DDT (badged as Renault M5Pt) TCe I4
- Transmission: 6-speed manual; 6-speed EDC dual-clutch

Dimensions
- Wheelbase: 2,669 mm (105.1 in)
- Length: 4,372 mm (172.1 in)
- Width: 1,847 mm (72.7 in)
- Height: 1,445 mm (56.9 in)
- Kerb weight: 1,407–1,430 kg (3,102–3,153 lb)

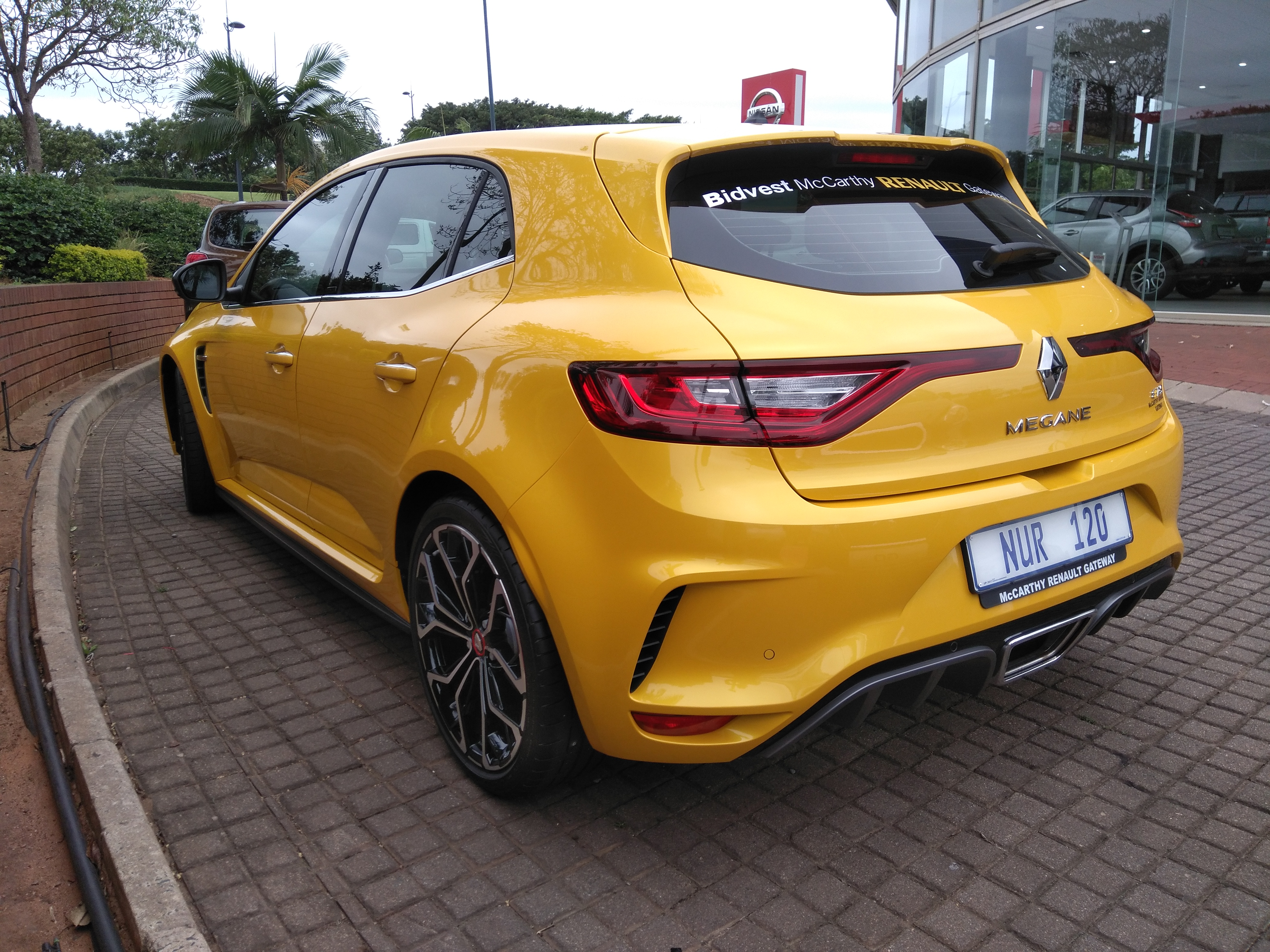
Rear view

The third generation of the Renault Megane R.S. is based on the 4th generation of the Mégane and was introduced at the 2017 Frankfurt Motor Show. It is available in 3 trims: 280-Sport, 280-Cup and 300-Trophy. The Mégane R.S. is only available in 5-door hatchback bodystyle and was developed with the assistance of Renault F1 team driver Nico Hulkenberg.

All feature a similar turbocharged 1.8-litre inline-4 engine (to a varying rate of tune) shared with the Alpine A110, and as standard a four-wheel steering system to improve handling, though this was removed to save weight in the Trophy-R. Five selectable drive-modes are available, namely Comfort, Neutral, Sport, Race and Personal (which is a customisable driving mode).

The gearbox choices are either a 6-speed manual gearbox or a 6-speed Efficient Dual Clutch (EDC) gearbox with paddle shifters and launch control (which can be activated by holding both of the shifter paddles).

The interior features a portrait style infotainment system and red graphical display on the digital tachometer flanked by analogue fuel and water temperature gauges. The infotainment system supports AppleCarPlay and Android Auto. An engine revving sound is played through the speakers when the driver opens the door of the car. Red stitching with RS badges are standard on the interior and the Trophy model adds an Alcantara-suede trim on the steering wheel. Recaro sports seats are optional equipment. Buyers have the choice to have a carbon fibre weave or an Alcantara trim.

The suspension system has struts up front and a torsion beam at the rear, but its front configuration has new geometry and retains Renault Sport's PerfoHub technology, which reduces kingpin angle offset and resists torque and bump steer. The system uses fluid-filled shock absorbers commonly found on rally cars on the lower end of the suspension struts and is called a damper within a damper system by the manufacturer.

The entry-level 280 Sport, features a torque-vectoring system of braking the inner wheels during a turn, to further improve turn-in; and a passive double damping suspension system.

The 280 Cup trim is similar to the 280 Sport trim, but adds a mechanical Torsen limited-slip-differential to the front wheels along with a 10% stiffer suspension setup. 19-inch wheels with Bridgestone tyres and lightweight brakes with aluminium hubs and red calipers are optional.

The 300 Trophy is similar to the 280 Cup, but has even firmer suspension, a lightweight DESS (Dual-Energy Storage System) battery, a different cylinder head and turbocharger with a higher-performance engine tune for more power, 300 PS (221 kW). Torque figure is increased to 420 N⋅m (310 lb⋅ft), lowered to 400 N⋅m (295 lb⋅ft) for cars with a manual gearbox.

=== Trim levels ===
==== Road models ====
Petrol engine
Model	Displacement	Type code	Power	Torque	Top speed	0–100 km/h (0–62 mph) (s)
1.8 R.S. 280 Sport and Cup	1,798 cc (109.7 cu in)	TCe M5P	206 kW (280 PS; 276 hp)	390 N⋅m (288 lb⋅ft) at 2,400–4,800 rpm	255 km/h (158 mph)	5.8
1.8 R.S. 300 Trophy	1,798 cc (109.7 cu in)	TCe M5P	221 kW (300 PS; 296 hp)	420 N⋅m (310 lb⋅ft) at 3,200–4,800 rpm	255 km/h (158 mph)	5.7
1.8 R.S. 300 Trophy-R	1,798 cc (109.7 cu in)	TCe M5P	221 kW (300 PS; 296 hp)	400 N⋅m (295 lb⋅ft) at 3,200–4,800 rpm	265 km/h (165 mph)	5.4

Source: Top Gear Magazine

=== 4-wheel steering ===
A four-wheel steering system called the "4Control" is standard on the Mégane RS which uses electronic actuators to turn the rear wheels synchronised with the front wheels.

Depending on the speed, the system may turn the rear wheels up to 2.7 degrees in the opposite direction to the front wheels or can turn the rear wheels up to 1 degree in the same direction as the front wheels.

Changeover happens at 60 km/h (37 mph) in Normal driving (all modes other than Race). The rear wheels are turned in the opposite direction to the front at up to 60 km/h (37 mph) and makes a tighter turning circle. When the speedo swings past 60, they turn in the same direction as the fronts to virtually extend the wheelbase for better motorway driving stability.

In Race mode, changeover happens at a much higher 100 km/h (62 mph) allowing tighter cornering at higher speeds.

=== Facelift (2021) ===
In 2020, the facelifted Megane RS was introduced for the 2021 model year.

The trim levels were revised and the 280-Sport model was removed, bringing the engine power output to 300 hp (221 kW) for all facelifted Megane RS models. Buyers could choose between the 300-Sport and the 300-Trophy, equipped similarly to the pre-facelift models.

On the outside, the facelifted Megane RS came with new LED headlights and different-looking taillights. Inside, the instrument panel was now fully digital and the infotainment system used a new software. The climate controls were also changed and now featured separate temperature displays on the temperature control dials. The ambient lighting was removed from the rear door cards.
