= Carbuyer =

British automotive reviews website

- Website type: Automotive Reviews
- Available in: English
- Headquarters: London, United Kingdom
- Owner: Carwow
- Website: www.carbuyer.co.uk
- Commercial: Yes
- Registration: None
- Launched: 29 October 2010; 15 years ago
- Current status: Active

Carbuyer is a web publication that offers car reviews, news and advice for the British car buyers, with a focus on new rather than used cars. It was launched by Dennis Publishing in 2010, and was first published on 29 October 2010. It is intended primarily for consumers rather than auto enthusiasts. The site includes facts and figures from CAP HPI, allowing visitors to access specifications for every new model on sale.

Carbuyer produces its own video car reviews, which are published on the website and on its YouTube channel. Richard Ingram, Nicola Hume, Sara Damergi, James Batchelor, Ginny Buckley, Mat Watson and Rebecca Jackson have all presented Carbuyer video car reviews.

The website allows motorists to submit reviews of their own cars which are then published as an accompaniment to the in-depth reviews from Carbuyer's expert journalists.

The website was short listed for Launch 2011 at the AOP Awards 2011, and then won Product Development of the Year (Consumer) at the PPA Data & Digital Publishing Awards 2011. It was also awarded the Plain English Campaign's Internet Crystal Mark in August 2011.

In January 2014, Carbuyer refreshed its image with a new logo, new video graphics and website design. Carbuyer began publishing a quarterly print magazine and has also published a book Carbuyer's Top 100 Family Cars. In January 2014, Carbuyer launched its first ever television commercial.

In 2021, Carbuyer and the rest of Dennis Publishing's automotive assets were spun-off as independent company called Autovia, which also published Auto Express, evo, DrivingElectric and Octane. In 2024, the remaining Autovia brands, including Carbuyer, Auto Express, evo and DrivingElectric, were purchased by Carwow.

== Journalists and photographers ==
- Paul Barker: editor
- Andy Goodwin: managing editor
- Charlie Harvey: content editor
- Tom Gumbrell: content editor
- Steve Walker: head of digital content

Road test team

- Richard Ingram
- Alex Ingram
- Dean Gibson

== Cars of the Year ==
- 2011: Kia Sportage
- 2012: Hyundai i30
- 2013: Dacia Duster
- 2014: Hyundai i10
- 2015: Citroën C4 Cactus
- 2016: Peugeot 3008
- 2017: Peugeot 3008
- 2018: Ford Fiesta
- 2019: Ford Fiesta
- 2020: Renault Clio
- 2021: Kia Sorento
- 2022: Hyundai Tucson
- 2023: Kia Niro
- 2024: BYD Dolphin
- 2025: Dacia Duster

== See also ==
- Auto Express
- Evo
