= Morgan Supersport =

2025 sports car by the Morgan Motor Company

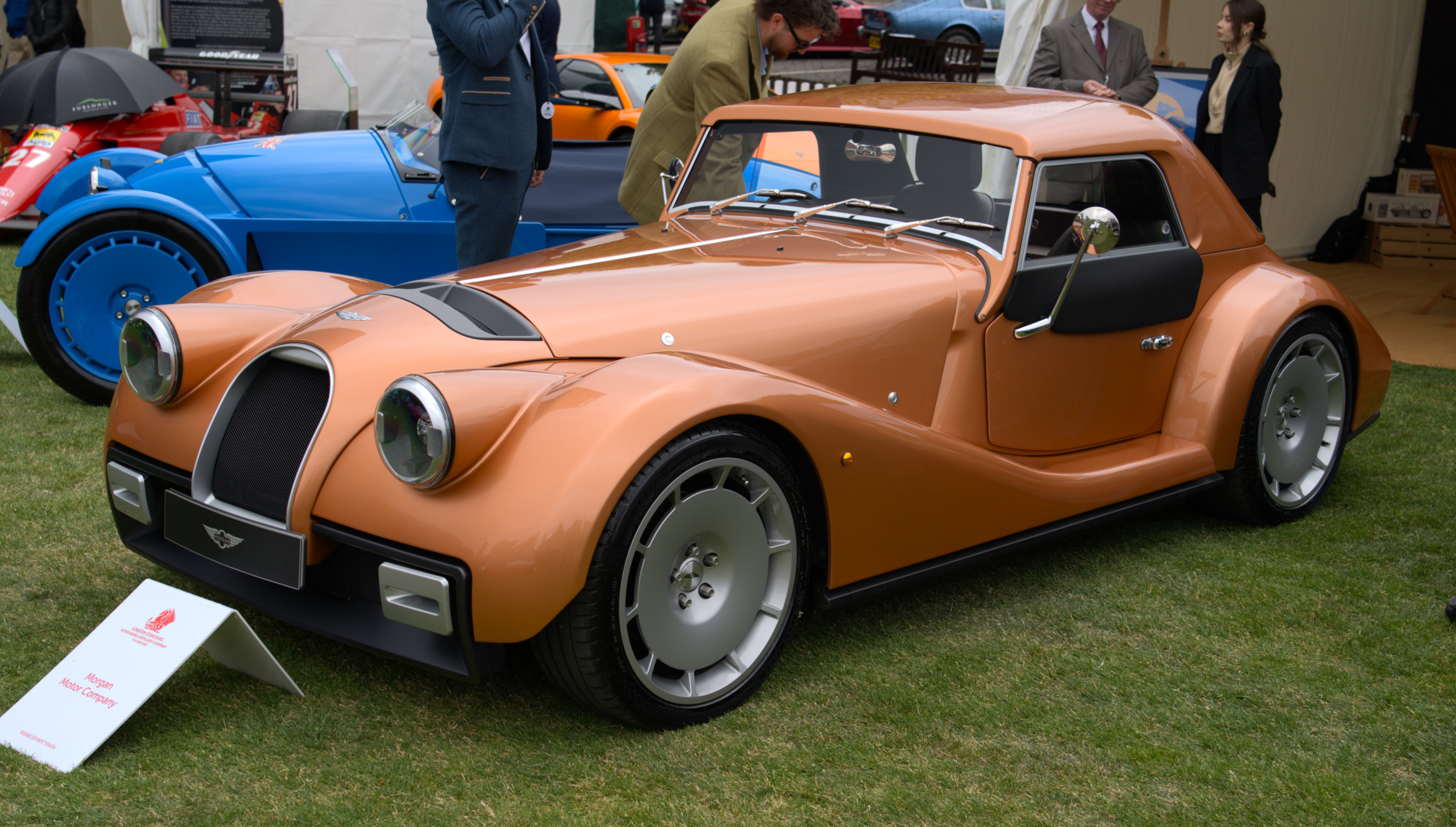

Overview
- Manufacturer: Morgan Motor Company
- Production: 2025–present
- Assembly: United Kingdom: Malvern, Worcestershire, England

Body and chassis
- Class: Sports car
- Body style: 2-door roadster
- Layout: FR layout
- Platform: CX-Generation aluminium platform

Powertrain
- Engine: 2,998 cc BMW B58B30 turbo I6
- Power output: 250 kW (335 hp; 340 PS)
- Transmission: 8-speed ZF 8HP automatic

Dimensions
- Length: 4,110 mm (161.8 in)
- Width: 1,805 mm (71.1 in)
- Height: 1,290 mm (50.8 in)
- Kerb weight: 1,170 kg (2,579 lb) dry

Chronology
- Predecessor: Morgan Plus Six

The Morgan Supersport is a sports car produced by the Morgan Motor Company. It is a two-door hardtop roadster with a front-engine, rear-wheel-drive layout.

== History ==
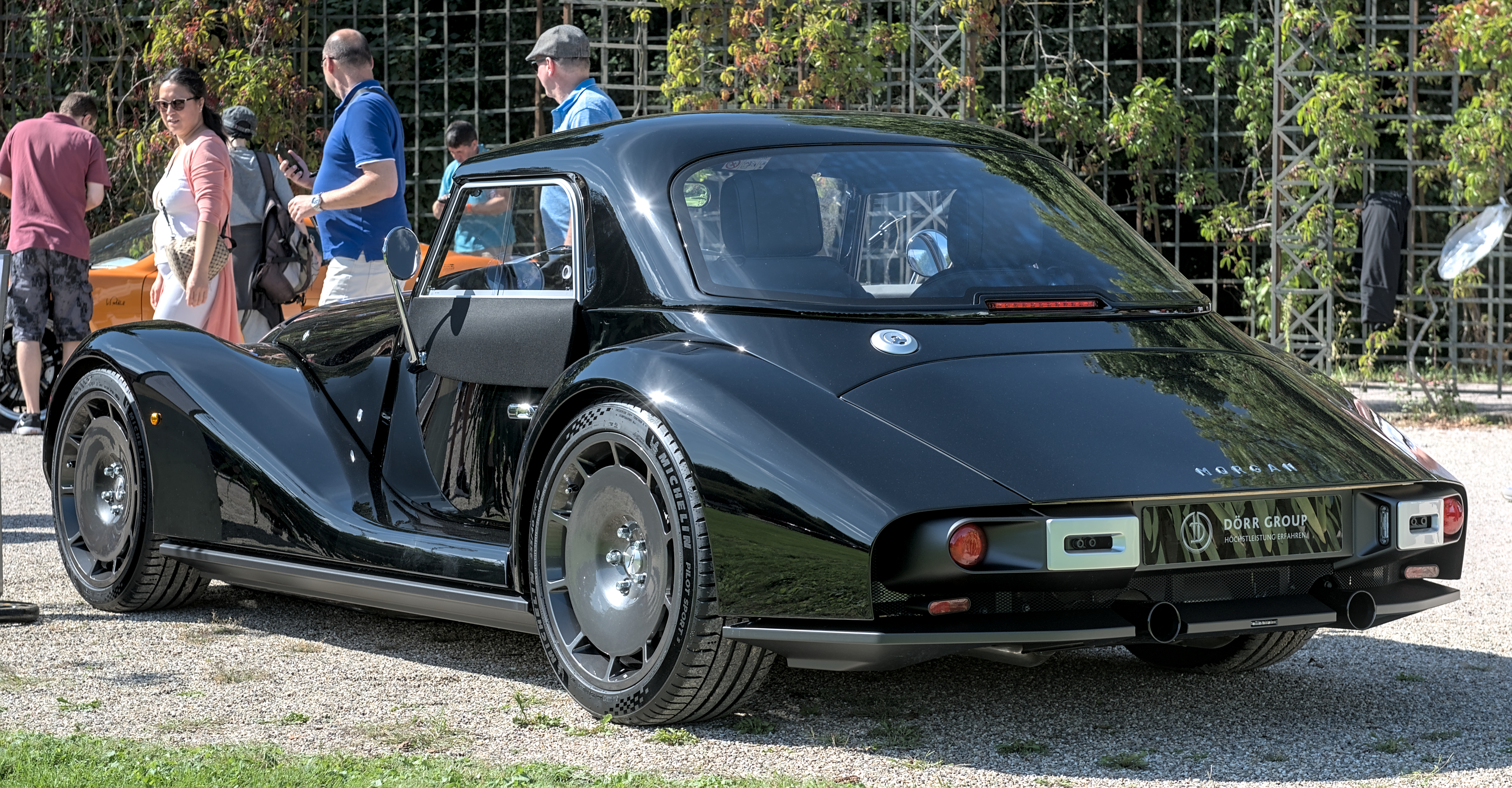
Rear view

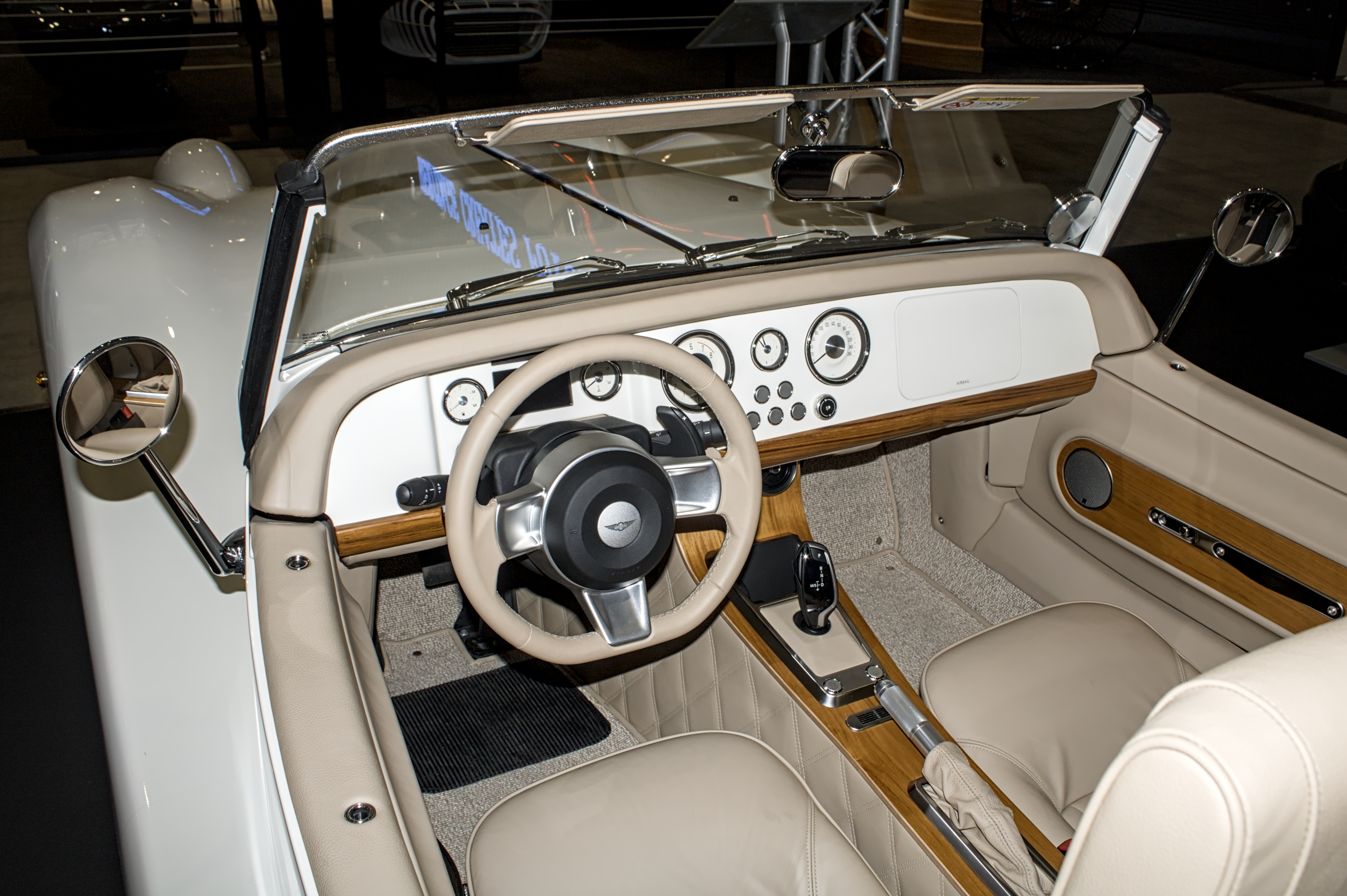
Interior

In autumn 2024, the manufacturer announced that it would cease production of the Morgan Plus Six in 2025. The successor model, the Morgan Supersport, was finally presented in March 2025. Sales began in the United Kingdom at the same time.

== Specifications ==
The design of the Supersport is a further development of the Midsummer special model based on the Plus Six, introduced in summer 2024. Technically, the Supersport is based on a further developed platform (CXV) of the predecessor model. The body is handcrafted from aluminium. The roof is available as either a carbon fibre composite hardtop or a mohair folding roof. The Supersport has removable side windows and a boot. Compared to the Plus Six, the car is longer, wider and taller, but the wheelbase is the same. The manufacturer states the kerb weight as 1,170 kg (2,580 lb).

The Supersport is powered by the B58 six-cylinder inline petrol engine familiar from the predecessor model. It achieves a maximum output of 250 kW (340 hp) and a maximum torque of 500 Nm. The vehicle is said to accelerate from 0 to 60 mph in 3.9 seconds, and the top speed is stated as 166 mph (267 km/h). An 8-speed automatic transmission from ZF transmits the power to the rear wheels.

=== Supersport 400 ===
In April 2026, Morgan announced a high-performance version of the Supersport, with the engine tuned to produce 402bhp, over the 335bhp of the standard model, alongside a number of chassis and visual upgrades, marking the most expensive and powerful model ever produced by the company.
