= Auto Express =

British motoring magazine

- Cover of issue 1856 (6–12 November 2024)
- Editor: Phil McNamara
- Former editors: Steve Fowler, Graham Hope, David Johns, Paul Barker
- Categories: Automobile magazine
- Frequency: Weekly
- Total circulation: 31,166 (December 2022) (2022)
- First issue: 1988
- Company: Carwow
- Country: United Kingdom
- Based in: London
- Language: English
- Website: www.autoexpress.co.uk
- ISSN: 0954-8866

Auto Express is a weekly motoring magazine sold in the United Kingdom published by Carwow Group. The current editor as of August 2026 is Phil McNamara.

== History and profile ==
Cover of 28 August 2002 issue, showing previous logo and design based on Auto Bild.

Launched in September 1988 by Express Newspapers, its 1,000th issue was published on 20 February 2008. Its only weekly competitor in Britain is Autocar. Auto Express is the biggest selling motoring magazine in Britain, with a circulation of 31,166. The Auto Express website receives between 3 and 4 million visits per month.

Auto Express is known for its in-depth reviews, road tests and group tests of the latest new cars, as well as for its news coverage on the cars and consumer motoring issues. There is also a wide variety of other content in the print magazine and on the website from long term tests and product tests to used car buying guides, opinion columns and features. Auto Express is also known for its spy shots and speculative illustrations of forthcoming cars.

It has sister magazines in France: Auto Plus, and Germany: Auto Bild, as well as in other countries around Europe, which follow the same design and format. In the UK Auto Express is part of the Carwow Studio group of automotive media brands that includes Carbuyer, Driving Electric and Evo, as well as the Driver Power survey.

== Driver Power ==
Since April 2001, Auto Express has published the J.D. Power rivalling "Driver Power" car customer satisfaction survey, which shows the best and worst cars to own that year according to motorists who own them. In 2022, the Kia XCeed was the top rated car in Driver Power and Porsche was the top manufacturer.

== Real-World Road Test ==
In February 2023, Auto Express launched the Real-World Road Test; a test that sees groups of two or three new cars subjected to a rigorous assessment processes focused on car buyers' needs. The test considers the merits of each car, not only the way that it drives, but also every aspect important to owners, from the space inside to the usability of infotainment systems. Equally importantly, it gives a clear indication of how much car buyers can expect to pay to buy and run the car.

== Sell My Car ==
In September 2024, Auto Express launched its own "Sell my car" service providing consumers with the option of selling their car directly to the Carwow Group network of over 5,500 verified UK car dealers. The service on the Auto Express website works by providing a car valuation and giving users the option of listing the car for sale. Once listed the car is made available for the dealer network to bid on and the car owner is presented with the highest bid, which they can accept or reject. If the bid is accepted, payment is transferred and the car is collected free of charge.

== Ownership ==
In 2021, Auto Express and the rest of Dennis Publishing's automotive assets were spun-off as independent company called Autovia. In 2024, Autovia were purchased by the Carwow Group. The former Autovia brands sit under the Carwow Studio division as part of the Carwow Group.

== Car of the Year ==
- 2000 Skoda Fabia
- 2001 Mini Hatch
- 2002 Honda Jazz
- 2003 Volvo XC90
- 2004 Fiat Panda
- 2005 Ford Focus
- 2006 Citroen C4
- 2007 Ford Mondeo
- 2008 Jaguar XF
- 2009 Ford Fiesta
- 2010 Skoda Yeti
- 2011 Range Rover Evoque
- 2012 Toyota GT86
- 2013 SEAT Leon
- 2014 Mini Hatch
- 2015 Volvo XC90
- 2016 Mercedes-Benz E-Class
- 2017 Land Rover Discovery
- 2018 Jaguar I-Pace
- 2019 Tesla Model 3
- 2020 Skoda Octavia
- 2021 Hyundai Ioniq 5
- 2022 Nissan Ariya
- 2023 Hyundai Kona
- 2024 Citroen C3
