= Morgan Plus Six =

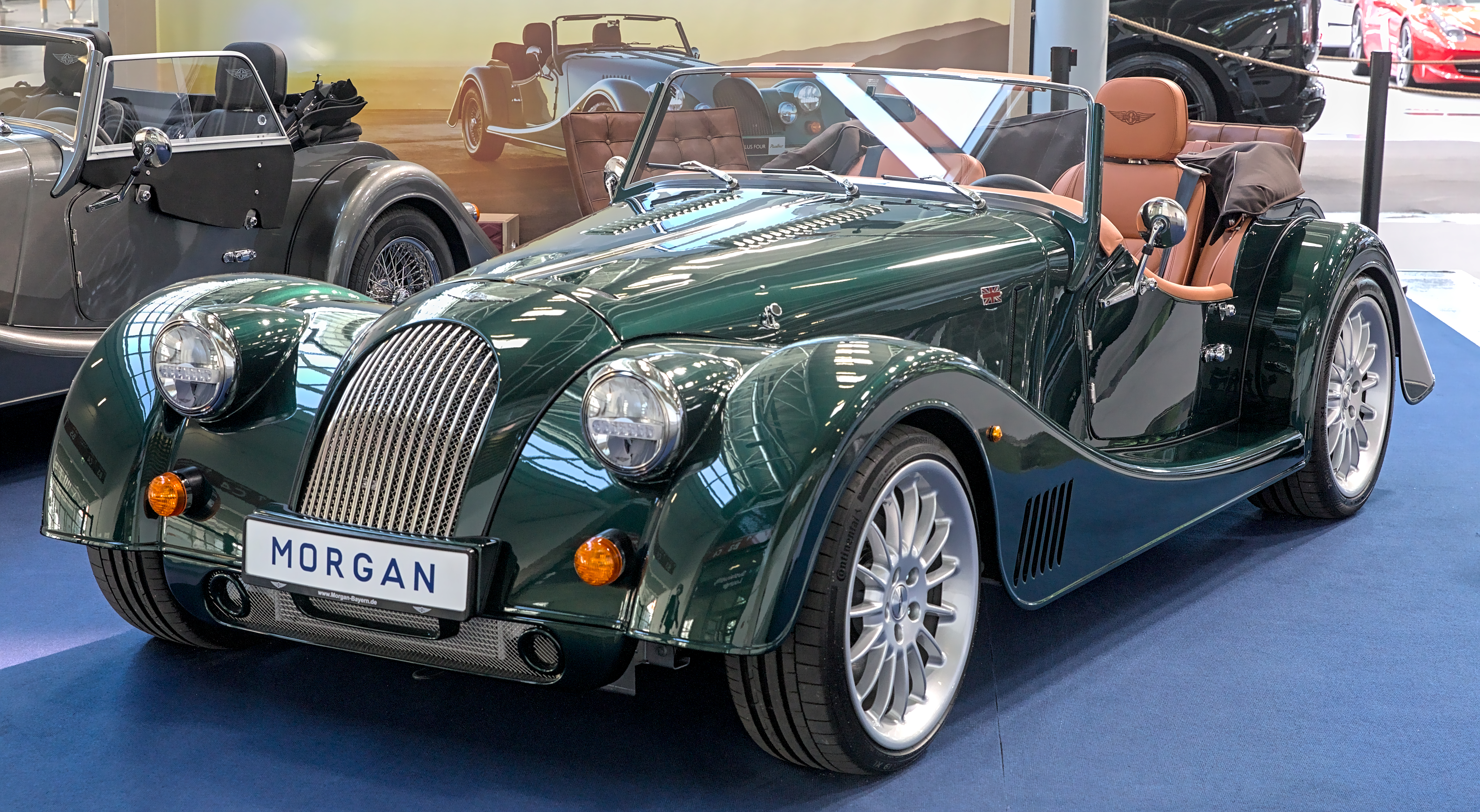

Overview
- Manufacturer: Morgan Motor Company
- Production: 2019–2025
- Assembly: United Kingdom: Malvern, Worcestershire, England

Body and chassis
- Class: Sports car
- Body style: 2-door roadster
- Layout: Front mid-engine, rear-wheel-drive
- Platform: CX-Generation aluminium platform

Powertrain
- Engine: 2,998 cc BMW B58B30 turbo I6
- Power output: 250 kW (335 hp; 340 PS)
- Transmission: 8-speed ZF 8HP automatic

Dimensions
- Length: 3,910 mm (153.9 in)
- Width: 1,745 mm (68.7 in)
- Height: 1,280 mm (50.4 in)
- Kerb weight: 1,075 kg (2,370 lb) dry

Chronology
- Predecessor: Morgan Plus 8
- Successor: Morgan Supersport

The Morgan Plus Six is a sports car produced by the Morgan Motor Company from 2019 to 2025. It is a two-door roadster with a front-engine, rear-wheel-drive layout that replaced the Morgan Plus 8.

== History ==
=== Launch ===
After the Morgan Plus 8 was discontinued in 2018, Morgan presented its successor, the Plus Six, at the 89th Geneva Motor Show in March 2019. Compared to the old platform, the Plus Six features a new glued aluminium platform, with the torsional rigidity increased by 100% and the weight of the new basic structure reduced by 100 kg (220 lb). The body still sits on an ash wood frame, which has been significantly reinforced compared to the previous series.

At the launch, the roadster was available in two colours - Emerald and Moonstone.

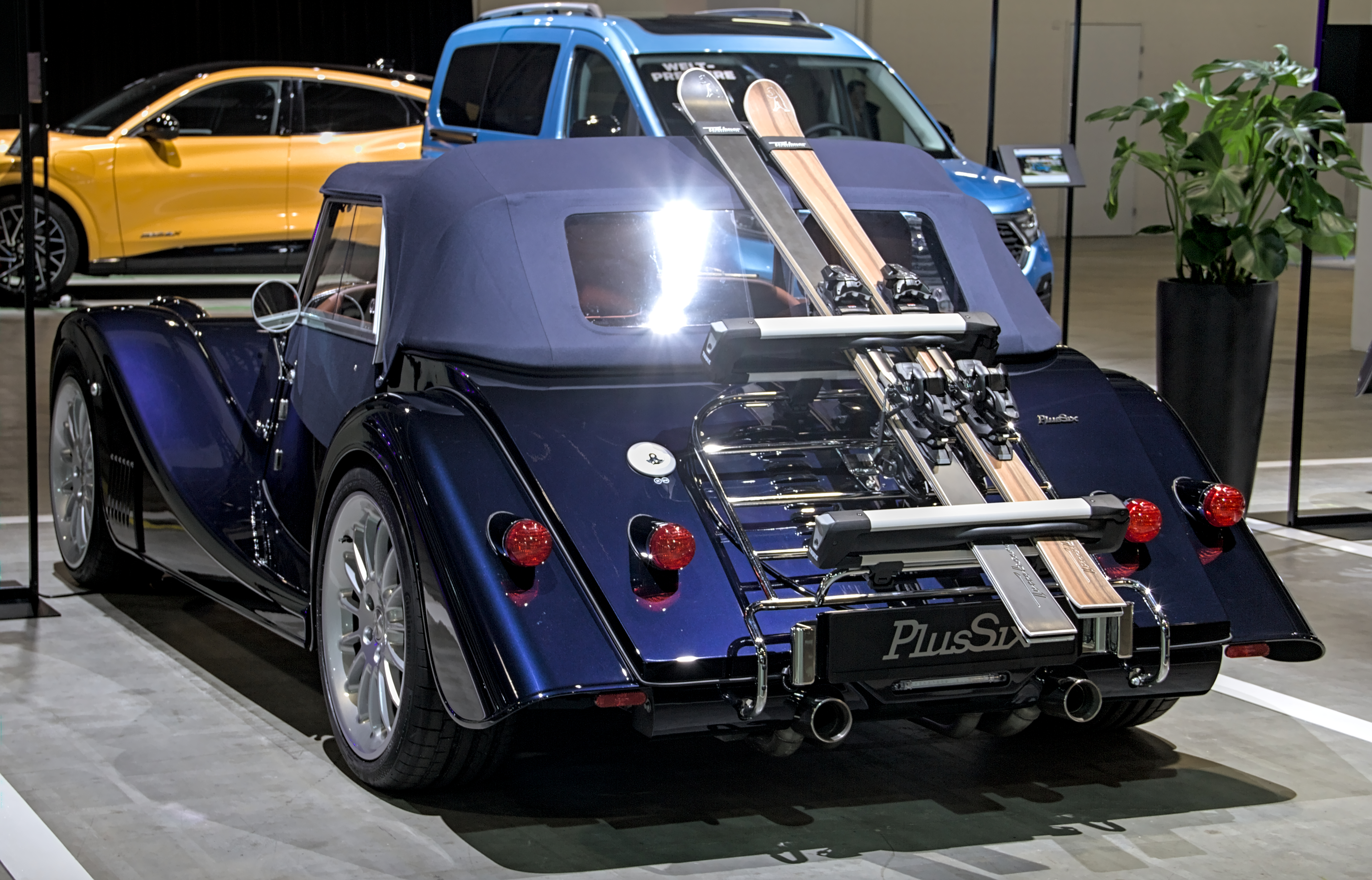
Rear view

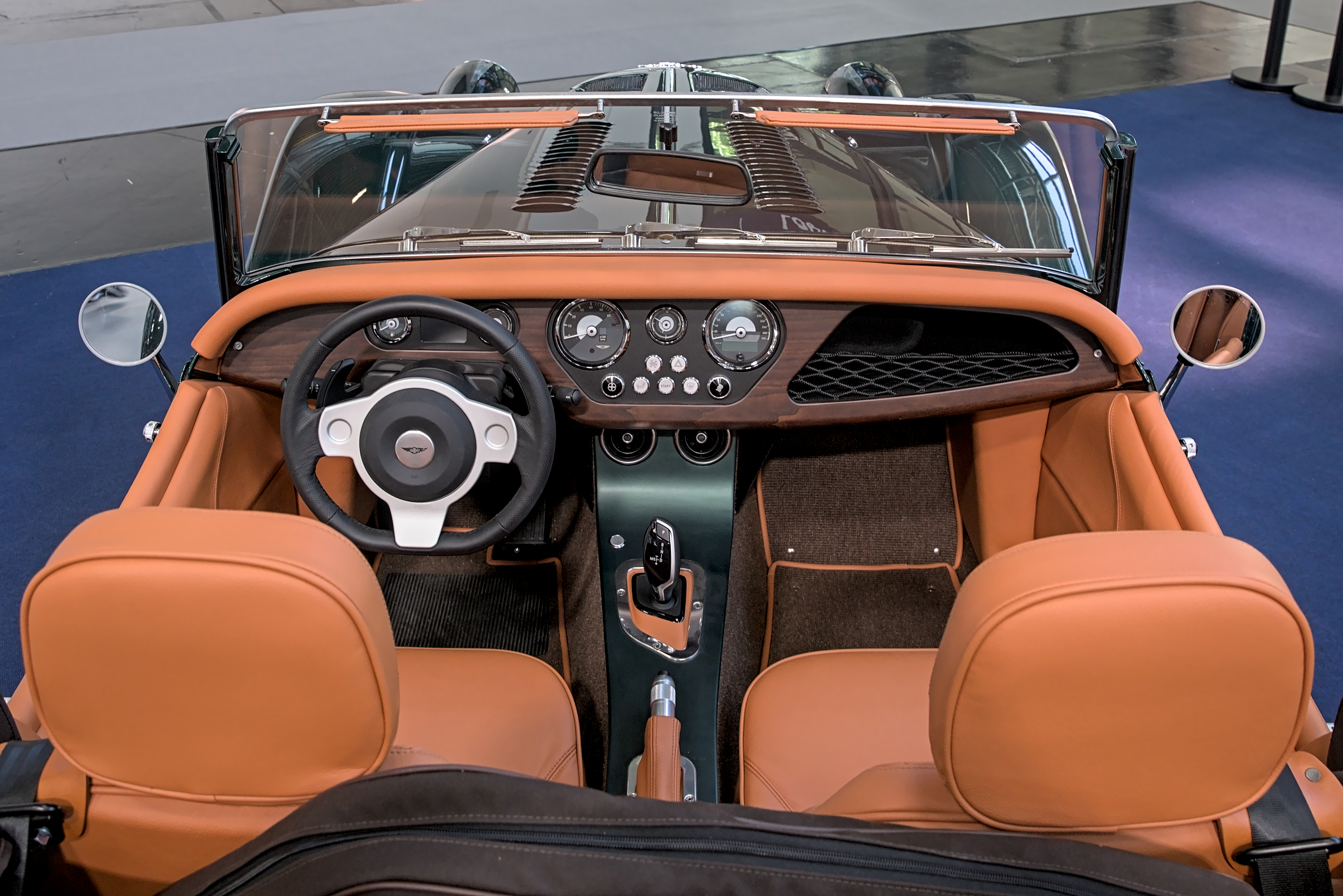
Interior

=== 2022 update ===
In November 2022, the series received technical updates, including a new brake system and a revised interior. In collaboration with Pininfarina, the special model Midsummer was created, limited to 50 units, which was presented in May 2024 and had its public premiere at the Goodwood Festival of Speed in July 2024. It is a Barchetta without a traditional windscreen.

Before production of the Plus Six was discontinued in 2025, Morgan presented the special model Pinnacle, limited to 30 units, to conclude the series in October 2024. The successor model is the Morgan Supersport, which was presented in March 2025.

== Specifications ==
The Plus Six features a new bonded aluminium platform called "CX-Generation," combined with a wooden frame. This design increases torsional rigidity by 100% compared to the previous aluminium platform used in other Morgan models. Additionally, they extended the wheelbase by 20 mm (0.79 in) and reconfigured the interior to provide more space.

The Plus Six is powered by the 335 hp (250 kW; 340 PS) BMW B58 in-line six-cylinder petrol engine and is notably the first model from Morgan equipped with a turbocharger from the factory. The vehicle accelerates from 0 to 100 km/h (62 mph) in 4.2 seconds and the top speed is given as 267 km/h (166 mph).
