= Morgan Motor Company =

British motor vehicle manufacturer

Morgan Motor Company Limited

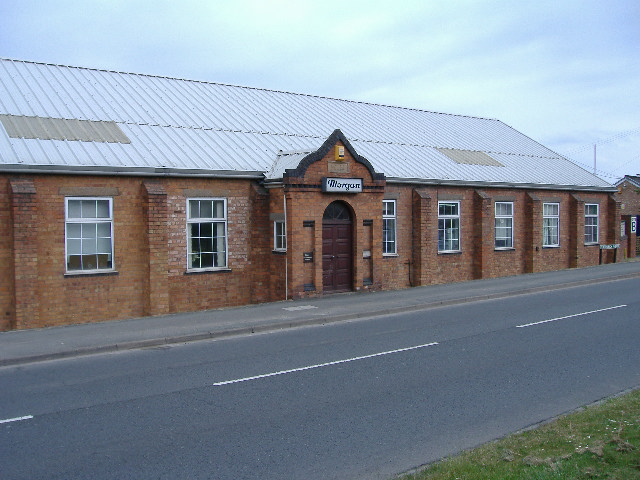
- The Morgan factory on Pickersleigh Road, Malvern
- Formerly: Morgan Technologies Limited (2010–2018)
- Type: Private
- Industry: Motoring
- Founded: 1910; 116 years ago
- Founder: H. F. S. Morgan
- Headquarters: Malvern, Worcestershire, United Kingdom
- Key people: H. George Morgan (Chairman; 1910–1933); H.F.S. Morgan (Chairman; 1910–1959); Peter Morgan (Chairman; 1959–2003); Alan Garnett (Chairman; 2003–2006); Andrew Duncan (Chairman; 2013–2016); Dominic Riley (Chairman; 2016–2019); Steve Morris (Chairman; 2019–2022); Lawrence Price (Chairman; 2023–2025); Matthew Hole (Managing Director; 2024–present); Stephen Armstrong (Non-executive Chairman; 2025–present)
- Products: Motor cars
- Revenue: (All divisions) £26 million (UK Companies House 2015 Financials)
- Owner: Investindustrial; Morgan family
- Number of employees: 250 (Miscellany, April 2023)
- Website: morgan-motor.com

Morgan Motor Company Limited is a British motor car manufacturer majority-owned by European investment group InvestIndustrial. Morgan was founded in 1910 by Henry Frederick Stanley Morgan. The company is based in Malvern Link, an area of Malvern, and employs approximately 220 people. As of September 2025, the company manufactures 630 cars per year.

Morgan cars are unusual in that wood (from the ash tree) has been used in their construction for a century and is still used in the 21st century for framing the body shell. An Experience Centre and museum have exhibits about the company's history from Edwardian times until the present day, developments in automobile technology, and a display of its most prominent historical models. There are also guided tours of the factory, an on-site dealership, and a restaurant

== Company history ==
H.F.S. Morgan quit the Great Western Railway in 1904 and co-founded a motor sales and servicing garage in Malvern Link. In 1909, he designed and built a car for his own use. Previously, he developed the first independent front suspension in the engineering shop of Malvern College. He began production a year later, and the company prospered. Production of three-wheelers approached 1000 by World War I and quickly resumed with both racing and touring models. Morgan's first four-wheeler arrived in 1935, and the company phased out three-wheelers in 1952. Morgan continued to run it until his death in 1959 at age 77.

In 1990, the company was the subject of a critique by Sir John Harvey-Jones for his television programme Troubleshooter. Harvey-Jones recommended modernising production and clearing the order backlog. The company rejected the advice, arguing that traditional techniques were part of the appeal of the company, and that a waiting list helped the company deal with recessions and preserved their exclusivity. Sales increased as a result of the programme and the company prospered. Sir John said he was very pleased to have been proven wrong in Morgan's case.

Peter Morgan, son of HFS, ran the company until a few years before his death in 2003. Alan Garnett, a non-family director, replaced him as chairman from 2003 to 2006. After Garnett's resignation, the company established a four-man management team.

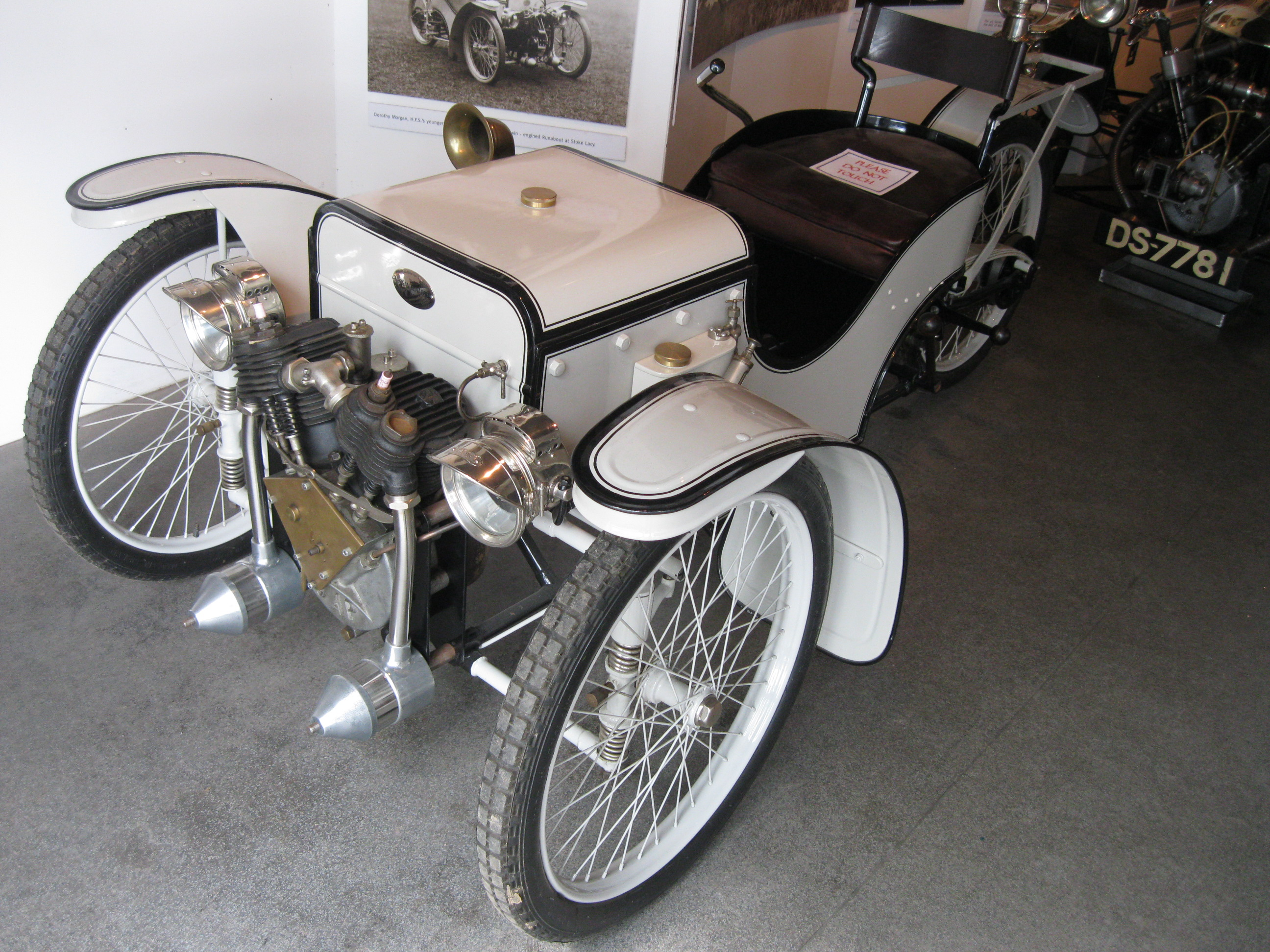
Single-seat Morgan Runabout, similar to HFS Morgan's 1909 car

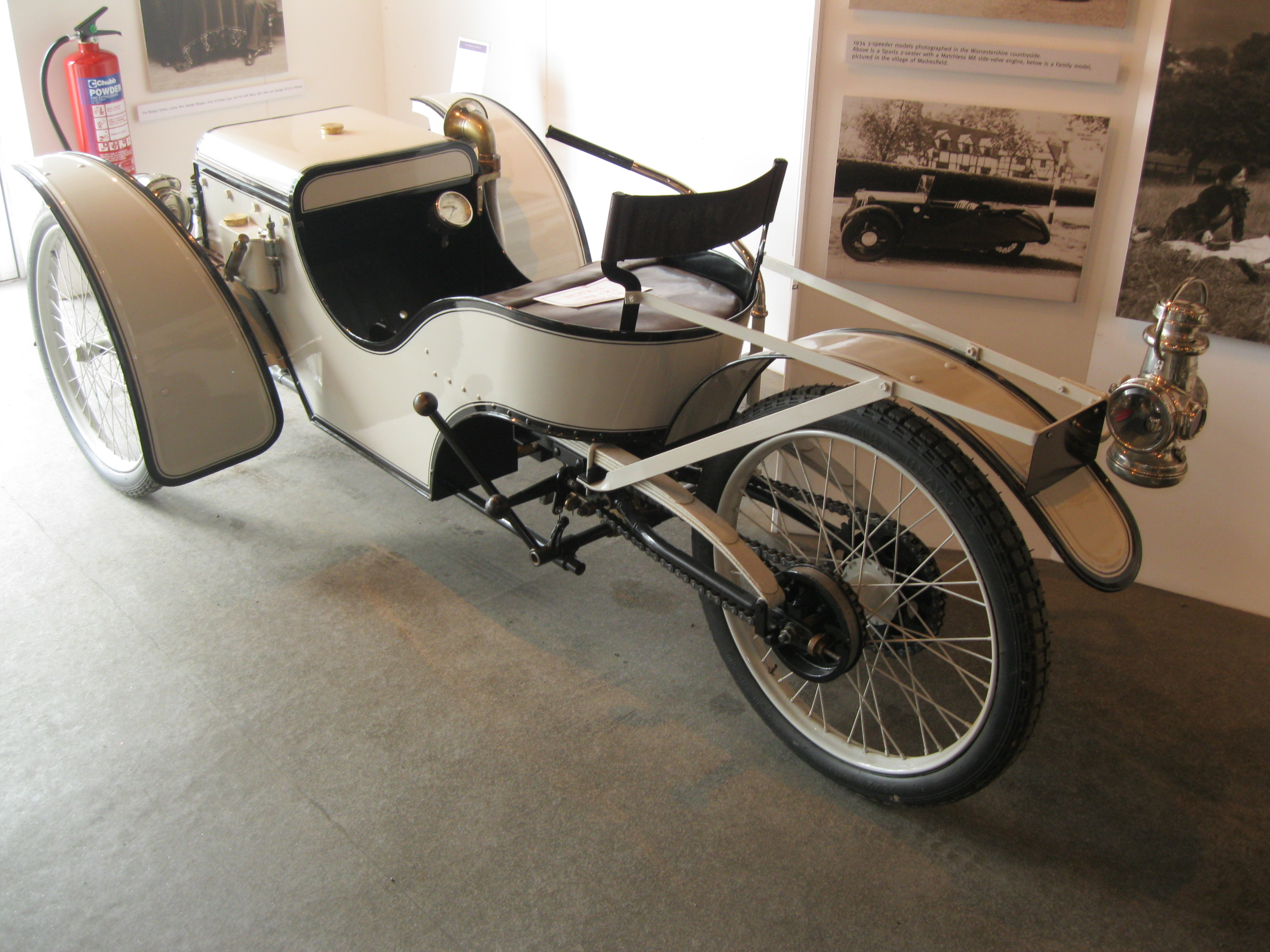
Rear view, showing swingarm rear suspension

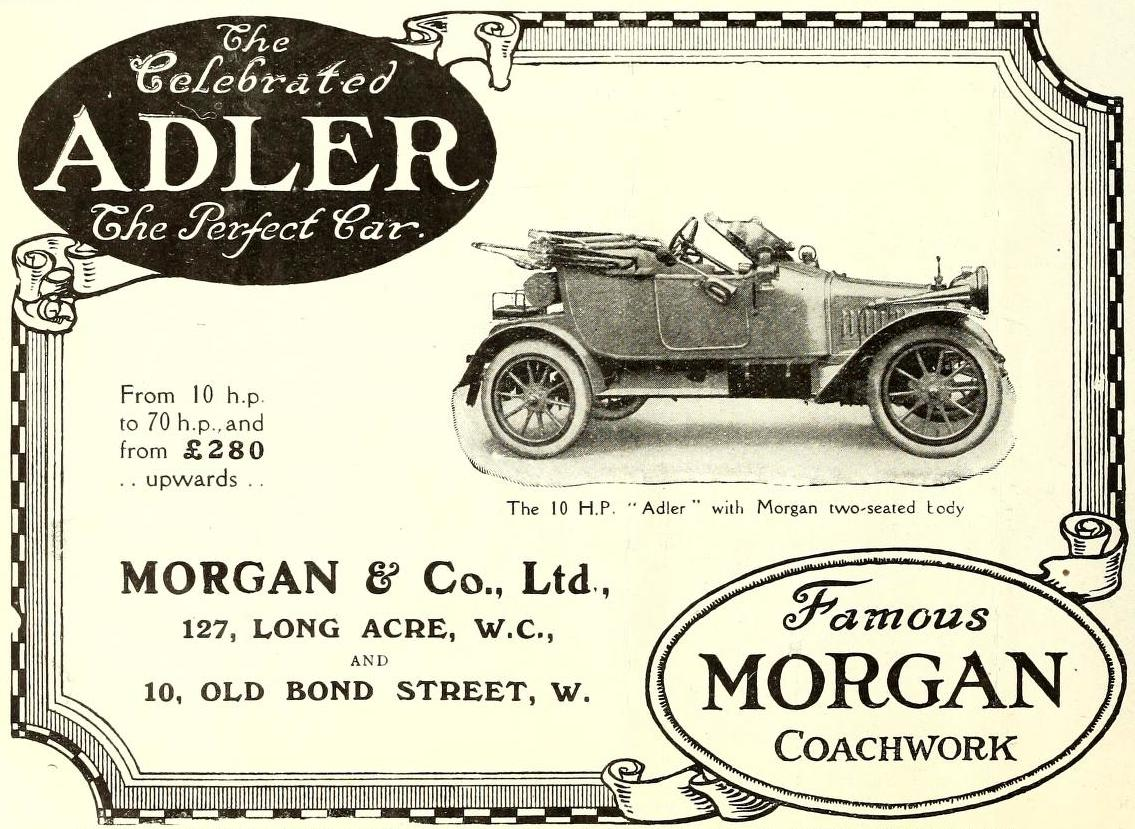
Advert for Morgan's four-wheel "Adler", from The Aeroplane, 15 August 1912

This team included Charles Morgan (son of Peter), Matthew Parkin, Tim Whitworth, and Steve Morris; in 2010, after Parkin's resignation, Charles Morgan was named managing director. In 2010, the MMC became dormant, and all assets were sold to a new company called Morgan Technologies for an unpaid 15 million, which took over all the former assets of the Morgan Motor Company, Aero Racing, the Morgan M3W Company, and all other companies bearing the Morgan name. This cured the negative equity that had occurred during Charles Morgan's tenure. UK Company House

In January 2013, Morgan was removed as managing director and replaced by Morris, but continued as strategy director until October 2013, when he was removed as both an employee and a member of the board of directors.

At the end of 2013, the shareholders appointed Andrew Duncan, a local solicitor and very close friend of the late Peter Morgan, as chairman. In 2016, he resigned as chairman and company director and was replaced as chairman by a new director, Dominic Riley.

In January 2016, the company was once again UK government funded by a £6 million grant by the British Government after a series of visits from UK politicians and Royals. In August 2018, the name of Morgan Technologies, was allowed to change its name back to The Morgan Motor Company while the original company, founded by HFS Morgan in 1957, had its name changed to a numbered company and accordingly registered at UK Companies House.

For most of its history, the company was owned by the Morgan family. A press release dated 5 March 2019 announced the acquisition of a majority stake in Morgan Motor Company Ltd by the Italian investment group InvestIndustrial. Though it was announced that as a part of InvestIndustrial's investment, management and staff were rewarded with shares in the company, this appears nowhere in the information registered at Companies House. And though it was also announced that the Morgan family retained a minority shareholding and would continue to be involved in the company this does not appear on any statement filed with Companies House.

In October 2024, it was announced that Matthew Hole would assume the position of managing director, taking over from former CEO, Massimo Fumarola. Matthew's previous position in the company was as chief technology officer, having joined the company in 2021.

In February 2025, the company appointed Stephen Armstrong as its non-executive Chairman, replacing the great-grandson of HFS Morgan, Lawrence Price.

== Early cars: three-wheelers and 4/4s ==
Early cars were two-seat or four-seat three-wheelers and are therefore considered cyclecars. Three-wheeled vehicles avoided the British car tax by being classified as motorcycles. Competition from small cars like the Austin 7 and the original Morris Minor, with comparable economy and price and better comfort, made cyclecars less attractive.

=== V-Twin three-wheelers (1911–1939) ===
H. F. S. Morgan's first car design was a single-seat three-wheeled runabout, which was fabricated for his personal use in 1908, with help from William Stephenson-Peach, the father of friends, and the engineering master at Malvern College. Powered by a 7 hp (5.2 kW; 7.1 PS) Peugeot twin-cylinder engine (from an abandoned motorcycle project), the car had a backbone chassis, an idea retained for all following Morgan three-wheelers, and used as little material and labour as Morgan could manage. A single-seat three-wheeler with coil-spring independent front suspension, unusual at the time, the driveshaft ran through the backbone tube to a two-speed transmission (with no reverse), and chain drive to each of the rear wheels. The steering was by tiller, and it had band brakes. It also had no body.

With financial help from his father and his wife, the car went into production at premises in Pickersleigh Road, Malvern Link. Three single-seater cars were exhibited at the 1910 Motor Show at Olympia in London. Despite strong interest, only a few orders were taken, and Morgan decided a two-seater was needed to meet market demand. It was built in 1911 and added a bonnet, windscreen, wheel steering, and crank starting; it was displayed at the 1911 Motor Cycle Show. An agency was taken up by the Harrods department store in London, with a selling price of £65. The Morgan became the only car ever to appear in a shop window at Harrods.

Interest in his runabout led him to patent his design and begin production. While he initially showed single-seat and two-seat versions of his runabout at the 1911 Olympia Motor Exhibition, he was convinced at the exhibition that there would be greater demand for a two-seat model. The Morgan Motor Company was registered as a private limited company only in 1912 with H.F.S. Morgan as managing director and his father, who had invested in his son's business, as its first chairman.

In 1912, Morgan set out to win the trophy offered by The Light Car & Cyclecar for greatest distance covered in an hour, at Brooklands. The single-seater covered 55 mi (89 km), only to be narrowly beaten by a GWK; Morgan returned later the same year, reaching nearly 60 mi (97 km).

Morgan established its reputation via competition such as winning the 1913 Cyclecar Grand Prix at Amiens in France, driven by W. G. McMinnies, with an average speed of 42 mph (68 km/h) for the 163 mi (262 km) distance. This became the basis for the 'Grand Prix' model of 1913 to 1926, from which evolved the 'Aero', and 'Sports' models. Morgan himself won the "very tough" ACU Six Days' Trial in 1913, in the sidecar class. The same year, the company entered the MCC reliability trial, which it continued to do until 1975.

Racing success led to demand the company proved unable to meet.

These models used air-cooled or liquid-cooled variations of motorcycle engines. The engine was placed ahead of the axis of the front wheels in a chassis made of steel tubes brazed into cast lugs.

After the First World War, the company introduced an easily changed rear wheel, which customers had been seeking for several years. The 1921 Popular, powered by an 8 hp (6.0 kW; 8.1 PS) JAP and bodied in poplar, sold for £150. It was a sales success, the price dropping to £128, and the name changing to Standard, by 1923, when a Blackburne engine was also available. The Grand Prix was priced £155, and the Family (with two notional child seats behind the front bench, setting a standard 2+2s would follow for generations) was £148 with air-cooled engine, or £158 with water-cooled engine. The Anzani-powered Aero was also available, for £148. MAG engines were also optional.

Morgan's racing efforts suffered a blow in 1924, when E. B. Ware's JAP-engined car rolled at the JCC 200 mi (320 km) at Brooklands; Ware was seriously hurt, leading to a ban on three-wheelers competing as cars.

Electric headlamps were made available in 1924, at an £8 cost. The Popular, powered by a 976 cc (59.6 cu in) engine, sold for £110, the 1,098 cc (67 cu in) Aero for £148, and the one-seater £160.

Like motorcycles, Morgans had hand throttles, Bowden-wire control mechanisms, and drip lubrication.

Racing Morgans included Harold Beart's 1,096 cc (66.9 cu in) Blackburne-engined special, with 3.33:1 top gear and a 43 lb (20 kg) streamlined body, which covered 91.48 mi (147.22 km) in a one-hour trial at Brooklands, with a peak speed of over 100 mph (160 km/h).

In 1925, the Standard's price had dropped to £95, and the Aero £130, compared to £149 for an Austin Chummy. Electric lighting by dynamo became standard that year.

Front-wheel brakes and electric start (a £10 option) became available in 1927, while the Standard's price fell to £89, complete with a double-thickness windscreen and "electric hooter". By year's end, the Standard was even cheaper, £85, while the new Super Sports debuted, with an overhead valve JAP 10/40 water-cooled vee-twin, priced £155. The 10/40 engine was also available in the Aero, at £132, while a more sedate air-cooled JAP-powered Aero went for £119. The Family was priced at £102 (air-cooled) or £112 (water-cooled). These new, lower prices persisted through 1928. They would be lower still in 1929: the Standard and Family at £87 10s, the Aero £110, and the Super Sports £145. In 1933, the Family was priced at only £80.

Morgan's racing programme in 1927 earned the marque eleven gold medals and three silvers from fourteen entrants at MCC's London-Edinburgh Trials alone. The team was joined by Clive Lones and C. T. Jay, who won the 1929 Cyclecar Grand Prix at Brooklands, driving a 750 cc (46 cu in) Morgan-JAP, with an average speed of 64.7 mph (104.1 km/h). And in 1930, Gwenda Stewart turned in a speed of 113 mph (182 km/h) in a race-tuned Super Sports.

Morgan three-wheelers benefitted from an annual tax of just £4, half the tax on the Austin 7, provided they remained under 8 cwt.

Morgans were also licence-built in France by Darmont.

By 1930, however, inexpensive four-wheeled cars were proliferating, led by the £100 Ford Popular. Morgan, and partner George Goodall, countered by putting the 8 hp (6.0 kW; 8.1 PS) 933 cc (56.9 cu in) and 10 hp (7.5 kW; 10 PS) 1,172 cc (71.5 cu in) Ford engine in their own cars.

Morgan's last vee-twins were powered by Matchless engines displacing 990 cc (60 cu in); they were delivered to Australia after the Second World War.

The vee-twin models were not returned to production after World War II.

The Morgan Three Wheeler Club was formed in 1945.

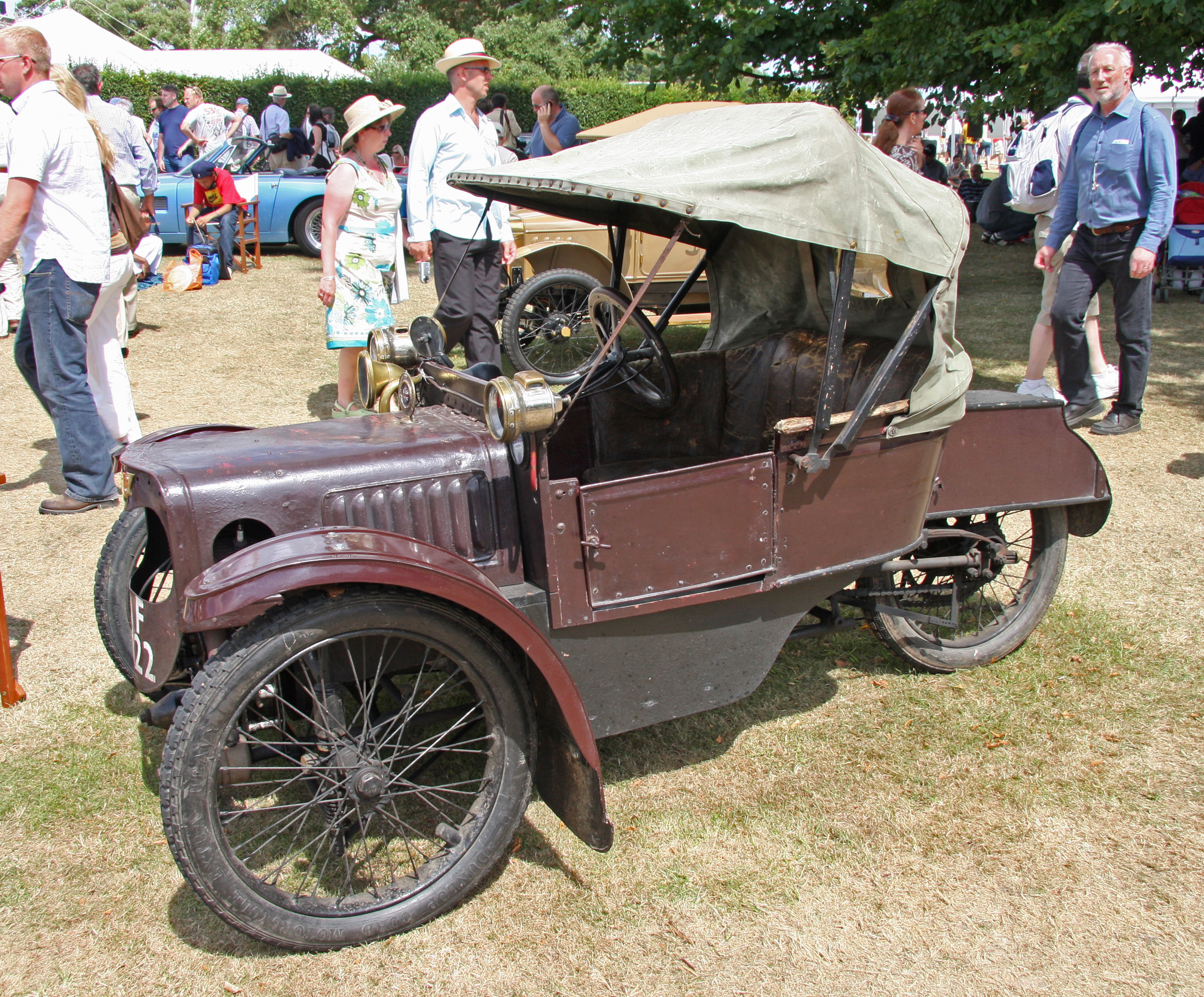
1912 Morgan Runabout Deluxe

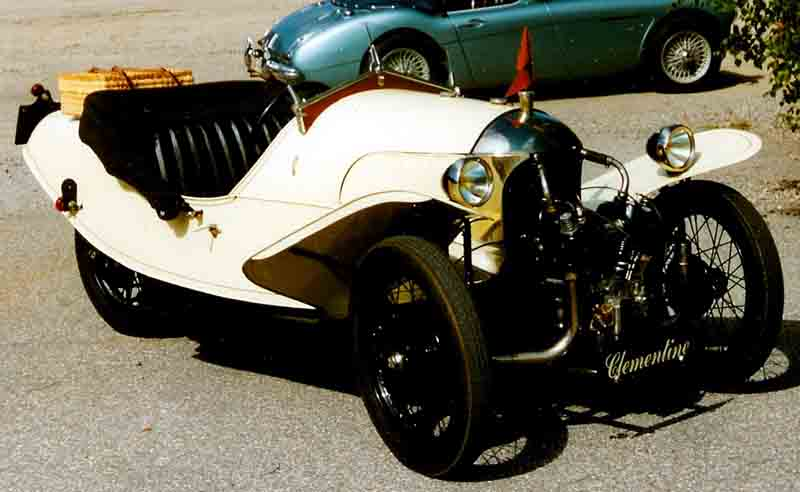
1926 Morgan Aero 2-seater Sports

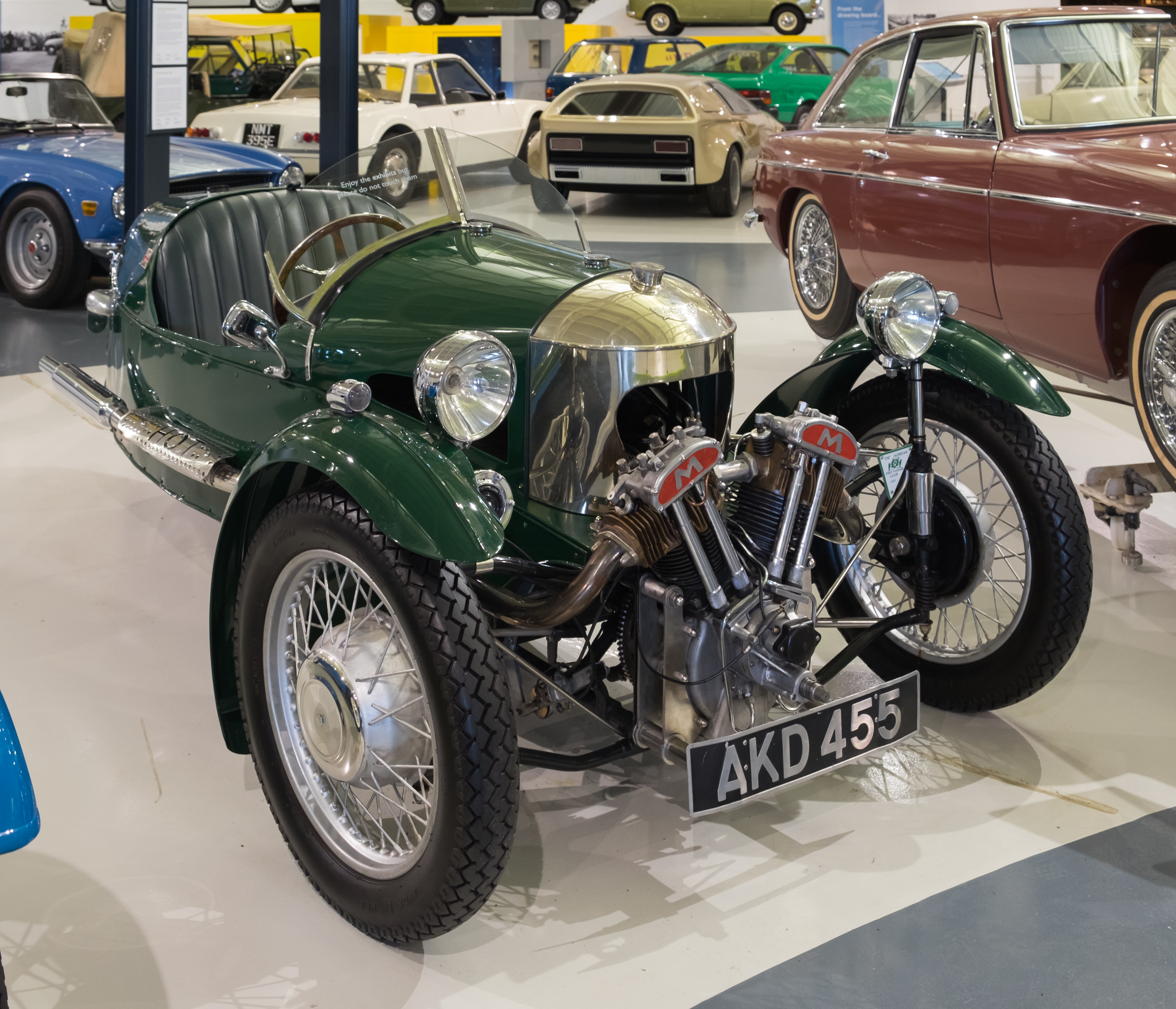
1935 Super Sports

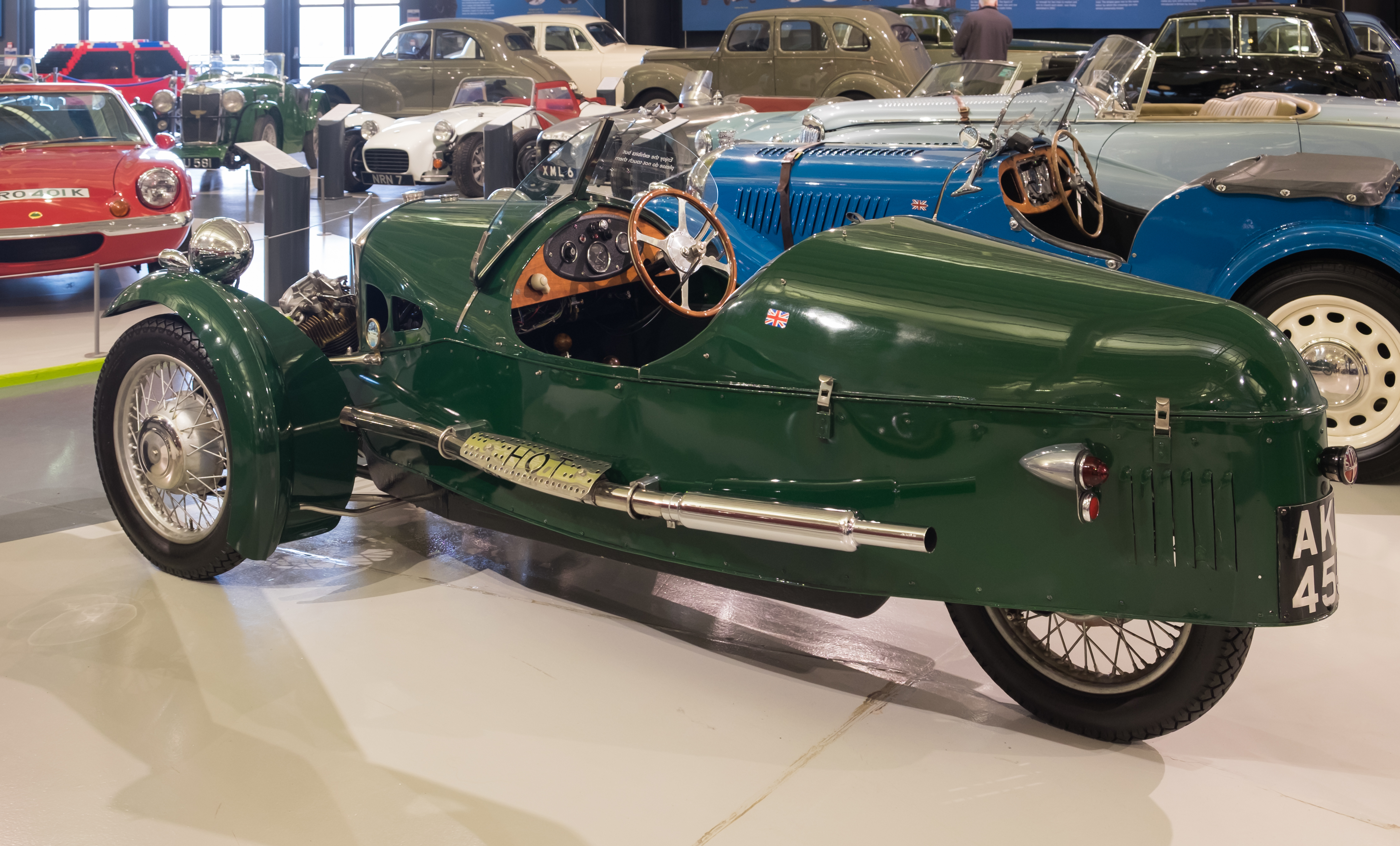
1935 Super Sports

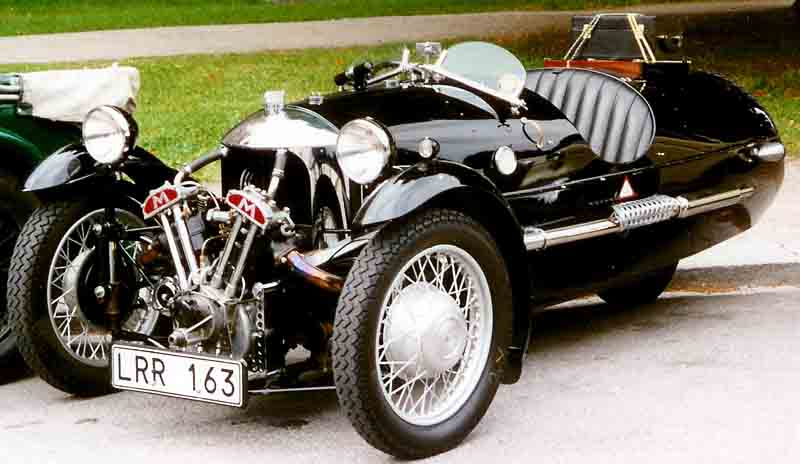
1937 Morgan Super Sports

=== F-Series three-wheelers (1932–1952) ===
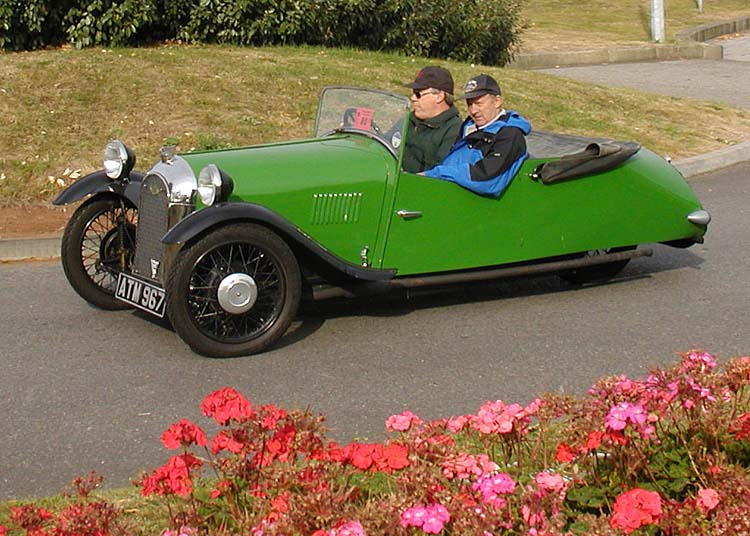
1936 Morgan F4 Open Tourer

The Morgan F-4 was introduced in 1933 at the Olympia Motor Cycle Show. The F-4 had a new pressed-steel chassis the four-cylinder Ford Sidevalve engine used in the Model Y, and a four-seat body. The F-4 was supplemented by the two-seat F-2 in 1935 and the more sporting F Super, with cycle-type wings and louvred bonnet tops, in 1937. Production of the Ford-engined three-wheelers continued until 1952.

=== 4/4 ===
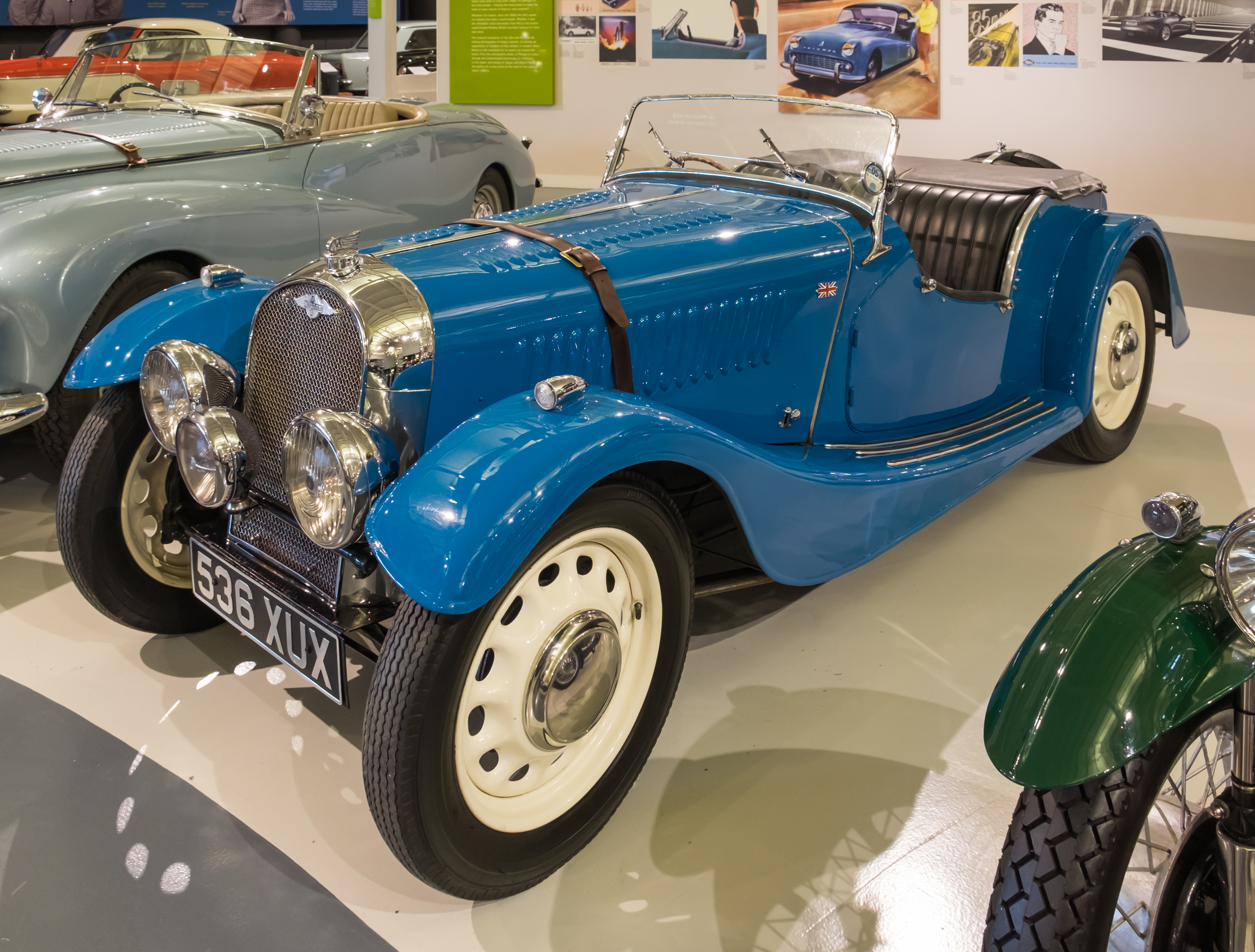
1939 Morgan 4/4 Series I

Morgan's first four-wheeler, designated by the factory as the 4/4 because it had a four-cylinder engine and four wheels, was released to the public in 1936. Powered by a 34 hp (25 kW; 34 PS) 1,122 cc (68.5 cu in) Coventry Climax engine, and carrying a pair of rear-mounted spare wheels, the new two-seater 4/4 sold for 185 guineas (£194 5s). It proved popular, and a four-place model was added in 1937, joined by a £236 drophead in 1938.

Coventry Climax eventually ceased making engines available, so Morgan switched to a tuned 1,267 cc (77.3 cu in) Standard Motor Company Ten, producing 39 hp (29 kW; 40 PS).

In 1938, a 4/4 was entered at Le Mans. This led to production of factory replicas, with fold-down windscreen, cycle fenders (mudguards), smaller-displacement engine, and single spare wheels, with a price of £250.

== Post-war cars ==
=== Morgan +4 ===
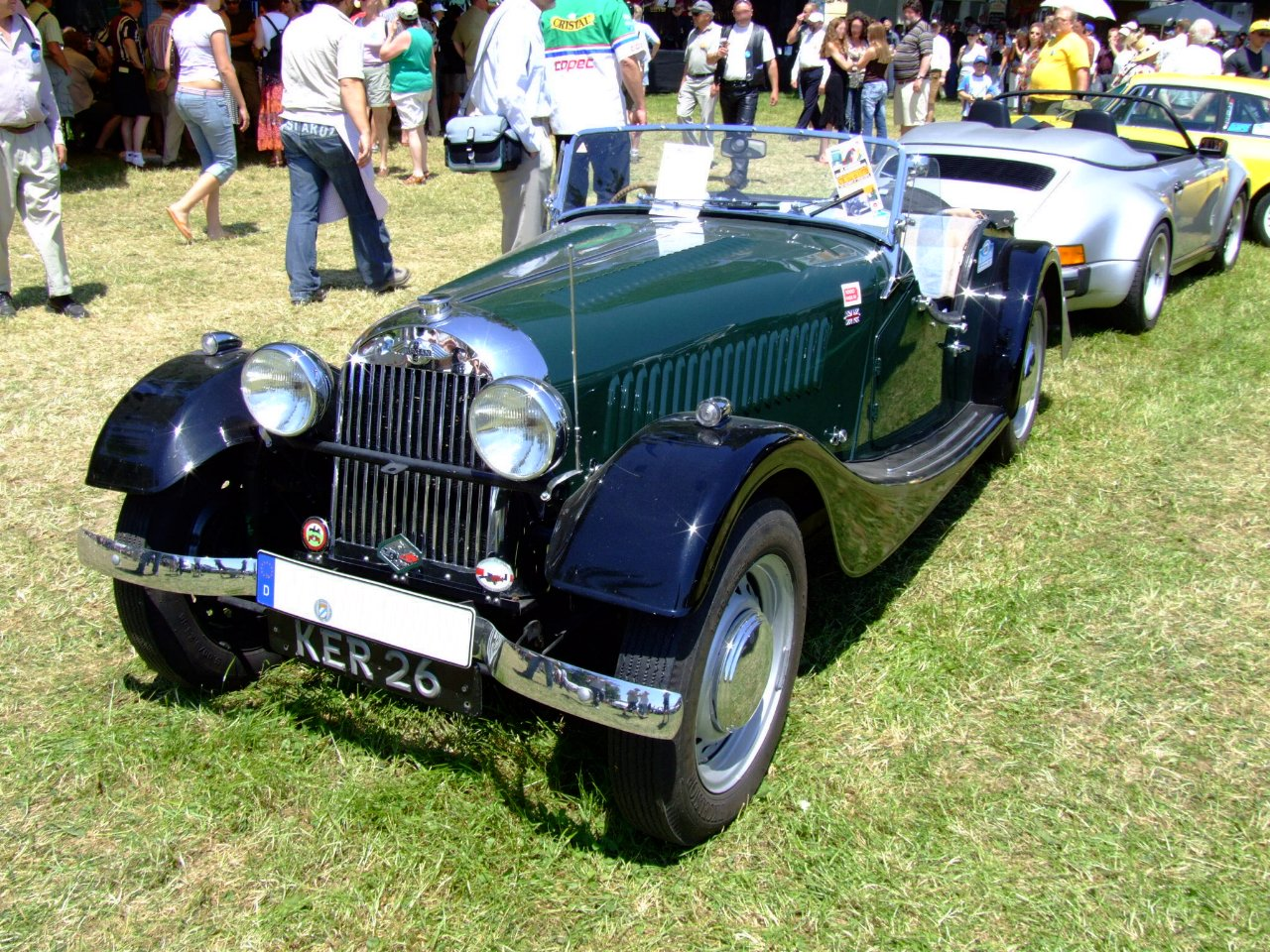
1952 "flat radiator" +4

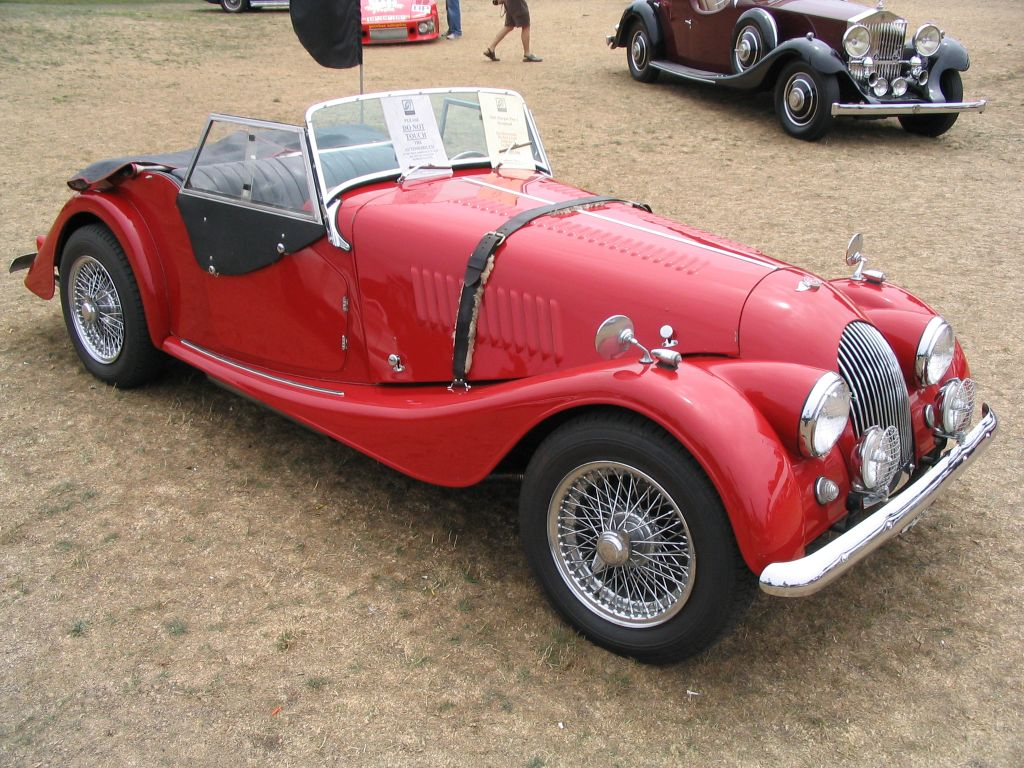
1963 +4

The Morgan +4 was introduced in 1950 as a larger-engined ("plus") car than the 4/4. The +4 initially used the 2,088 cc (127.4 cu in) Standard Vanguard engine and at introduction sold for £625 (two-seater) or £723 (coupé).

The +4 used Triumph TR2 (in 1953), TR3 (1956), or TR4A engines (until 1969). Plus 4 production was suspended in 1969 but brought back in 1985 with a Fiat engine (1985–1988) and then a 4-cylinder Rover engine (1988–2000). Production was again suspended and the Plus 4 returned once more in 2004 with a 155 bhp (116 kW; 157 PS) Ford 4-cylinder.

From October 1965 to April 1967 Morgan produced the two-seat +4 Competition, of which only 42 were built, about 11 of which survive.

A limited edition Plus 4 was re-introduced in 2014 as the Plus 4 Super Sports. Only 60 cars were made available, all right-hand-drive.

==== Morgan +4+ ====
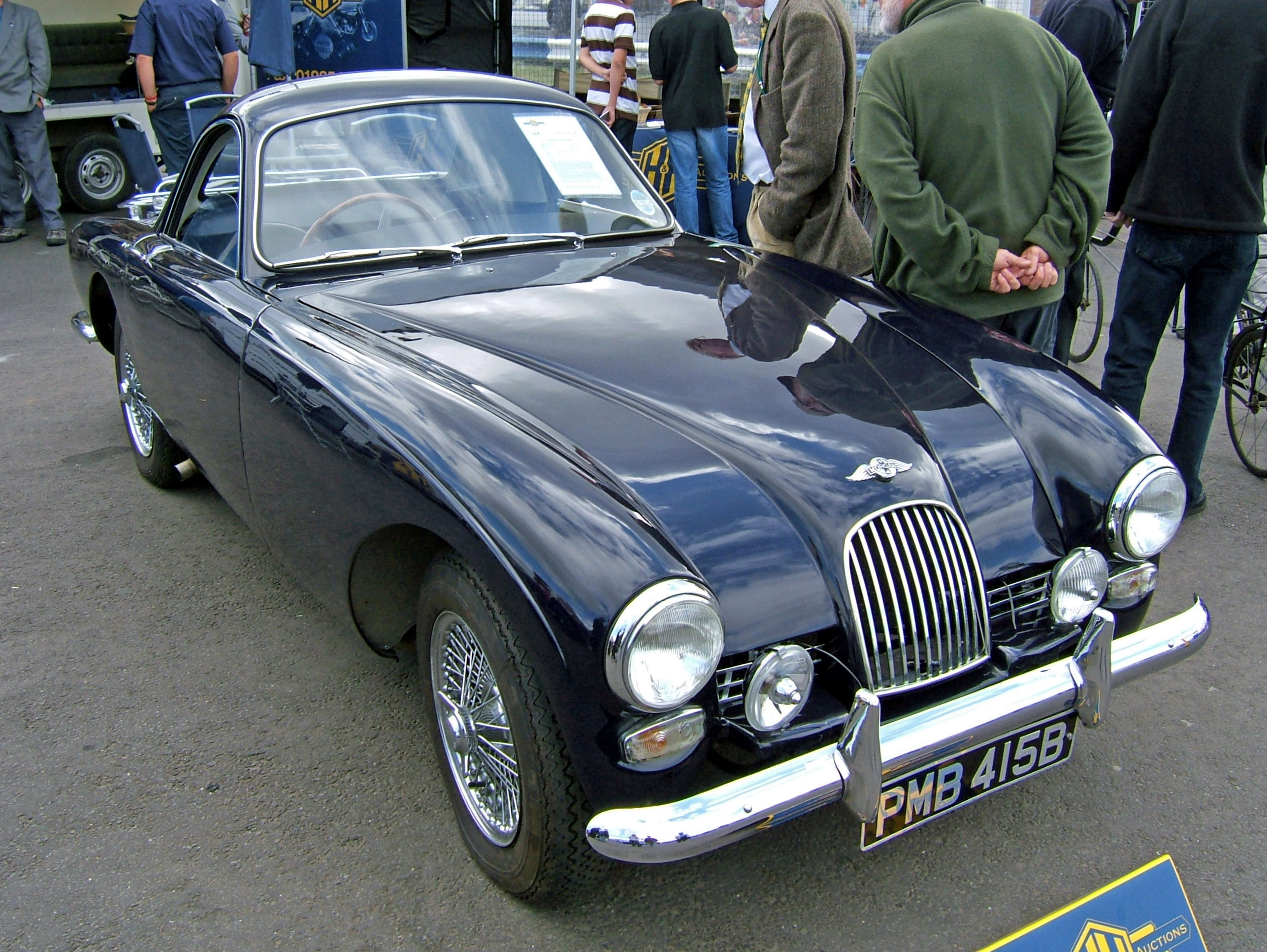
Morgan Plus 4 Plus

A version of the +4, the +4+, was made from 1964 to 1967 with a fibreglass coupé body. The light weight and reduced drag improved the performance of the +4+ over the standard +4 in every aspect. However, traditional Morgan enthusiasts did not embrace this departure from Morgan custom, and mainstream enthusiasts did not embrace the seemingly archaic +4 chassis. Fifty were planned, but only 26 were built.

=== Morgan 4/4 ===
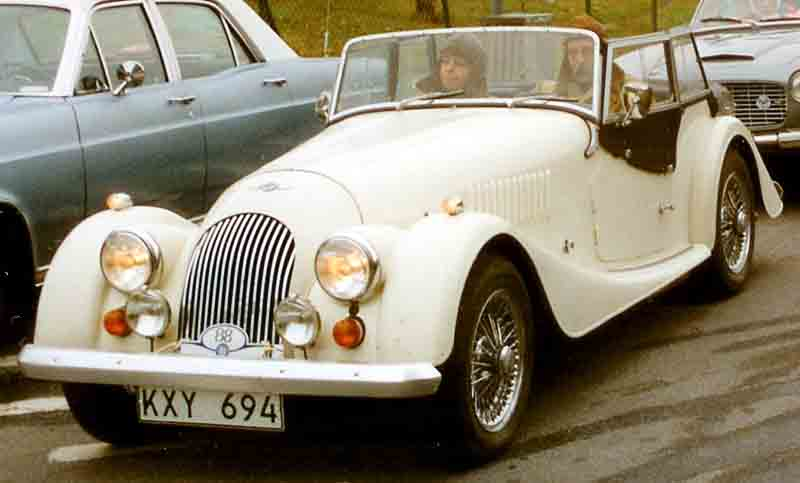
1974 Morgan 4/4

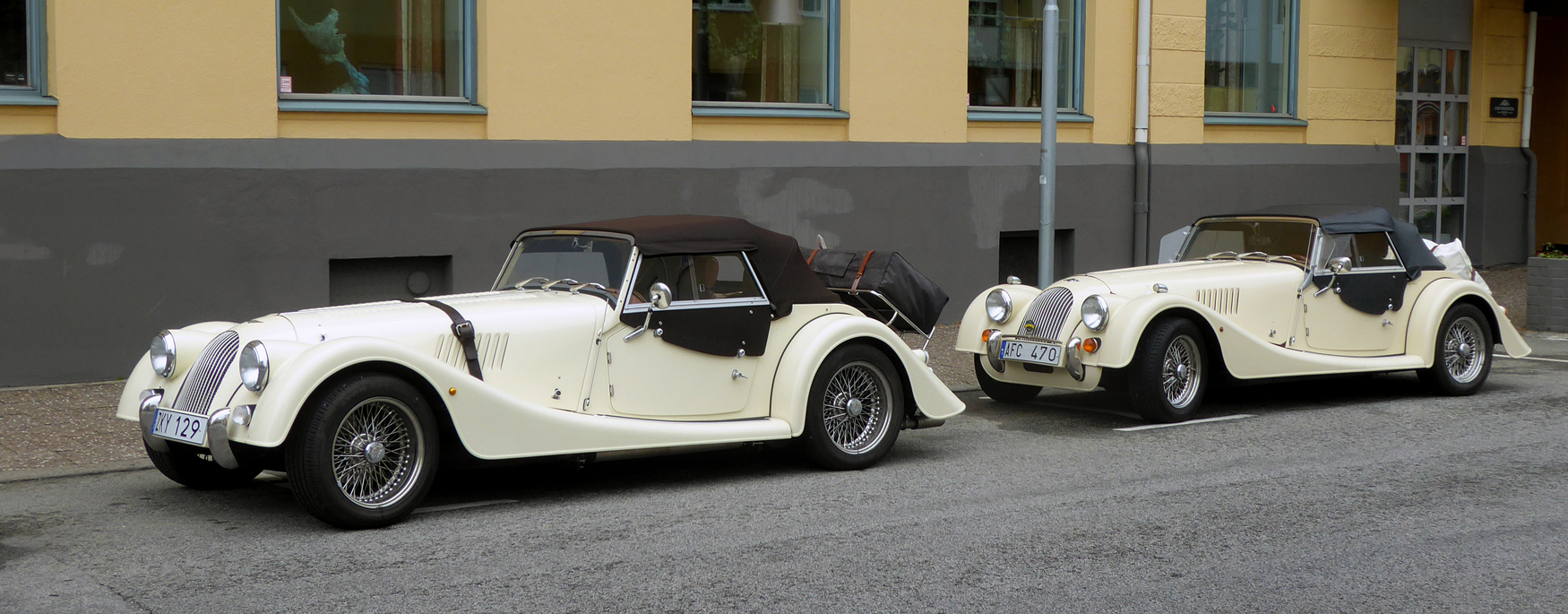
Morgans in Ystad 2019.

Production of the 4/4 was halted during World War II but resumed afterwards. Production halted again in 1951 when the Standard engine ceased to be available but resumed in 1955 when a suitable replacement, the side-valve 1,172 cc Ford 100E engine was found.

Apart from these breaks the 4/4 was in continuous production from its debut until 2018. Engine capacity increased from the 1,122 cc Coventry Climax engine in 1936 to a 1.8-litre Ford engine in 2004. From 2009 until the model was discontinued in 2018 a 1.6-litre Ford Sigma engine was fitted. Power has ranged from 34 to 125 bhp (25 to 93 kW) over the decades.

=== Morgan +8 ===
Faced with the decreasing availability of large four-cylinder engines for use in their +4 models, Morgan began to install the recently available Rover V8 engine in their cars in 1968, giving these cars the model designation "+8".

The engine displacement jumped from the 2.1 litres of the Triumph TR4 engine to 3.5, then 3.9 (1990), 4.0 (1998–2004), and with an optional 4.6-litre engine (1996–2000) all based on the same Land Rover block. However, this V8 was no heavier than the Triumph engine. These features made the +8 accelerate much more quickly than the early +4 and also improved its road-holding capability.

Horsepower (143–204 bhp), weight and performance varied with emission and structural laws through its history. Thus powered, the car could accelerate from 0–60 mph in 5.6 seconds. In its final form, the GEMS Land Rover V8 produced 190 hp (140 kW).

=== Roadster ===
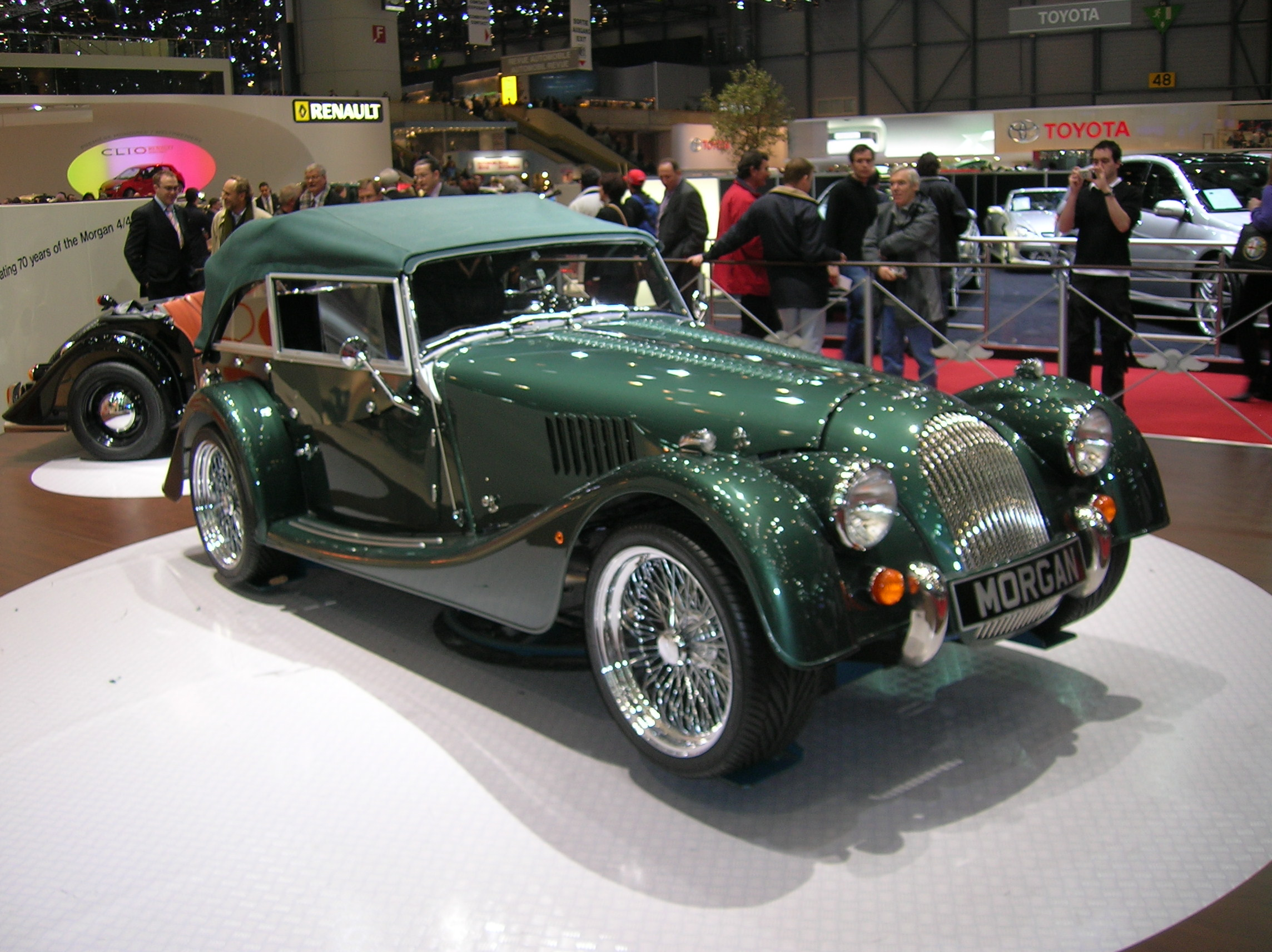
Roadster at the 2006 Geneva Motorshow

In 2004, Morgan came out with a traditional styled model to replace the departing Plus 8. The Mk I Roadsters with the Ford UK Mondeo V6 produced 223 bhp (166 kW, 226 PS) at 6150 rev/min. It had a Getrag gearbox with direct drive in 5th with a 3.08 axle ratio. Later Marks had a Ford gearbox with direct drive in 4th with a 3.73 axle ratio. The overall gearing is virtually the same. The later Roadsters were powered by a Ford UK Mondeo V6 producing 204 bhp (152 kW; 207 PS). In 2007, the Mondeo engine was replaced by a US-specification version of the same engine in the Roadster II. In 2011–12, the engine was replaced by the 3.7 Duratec Cyclone engine and output increased to 280 bhp (209 kW; 284 PS). The company calls this latest model the Roadster 3.7.

=== Morgan Aero 8 (Series I-V) ===
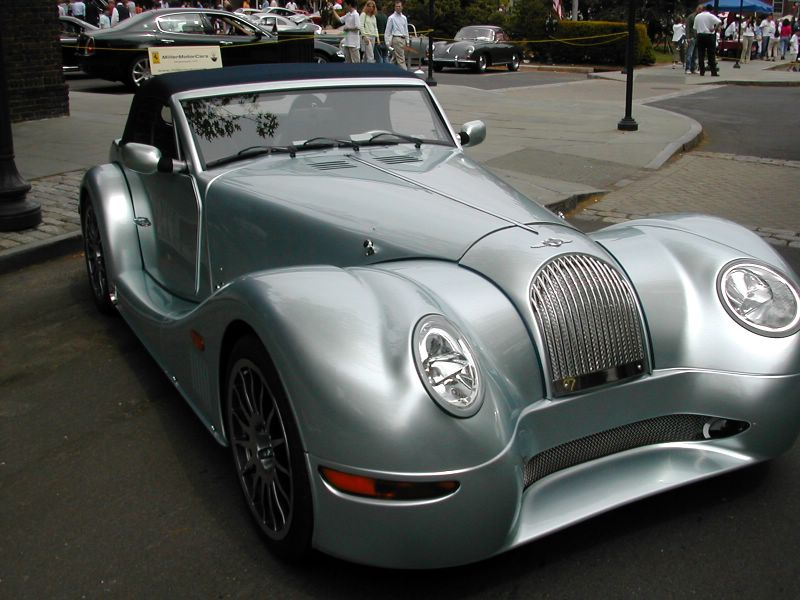
A Modern Morgan Aero 8 at the Scarsdale Concours

In 2000, the Morgan Aero 8 was introduced and, as always, the wooden body substructure was ash. (Contrary to popular myth, however, the chassis is metal; aluminium for the Aero 8.) The Aero 8, with a BMW V8 engine in a car weighing less than a BMW Z4 and considerably less than a BMW M3, (though more than traditional Morgans) is even faster than the Plus 8, delivering what Autoweek magazine termed supercar performance. The newest Aero 8 (series V), presented in March 2015, puts out 367 hp (274 kW) at 6100 rpm with the company suggesting a top speed of over 170 mph (270 km/h). Due to the Aero 8's light weight it can do 0–62 mph (100 km/h) in 4.5 seconds.

During its customer production lifetime (2002–2009), the Aero was configured in five official versions, (I, II, III, IV, the Aero America and V) with mild variations in styling, engines, transmissions, braking and suspension. The company cancelled the model in 2009 but relaunched it in 2015 for 2016 deliveries. The year of highest production for any Aero variation was 2002.

=== Morgan AeroMax ===
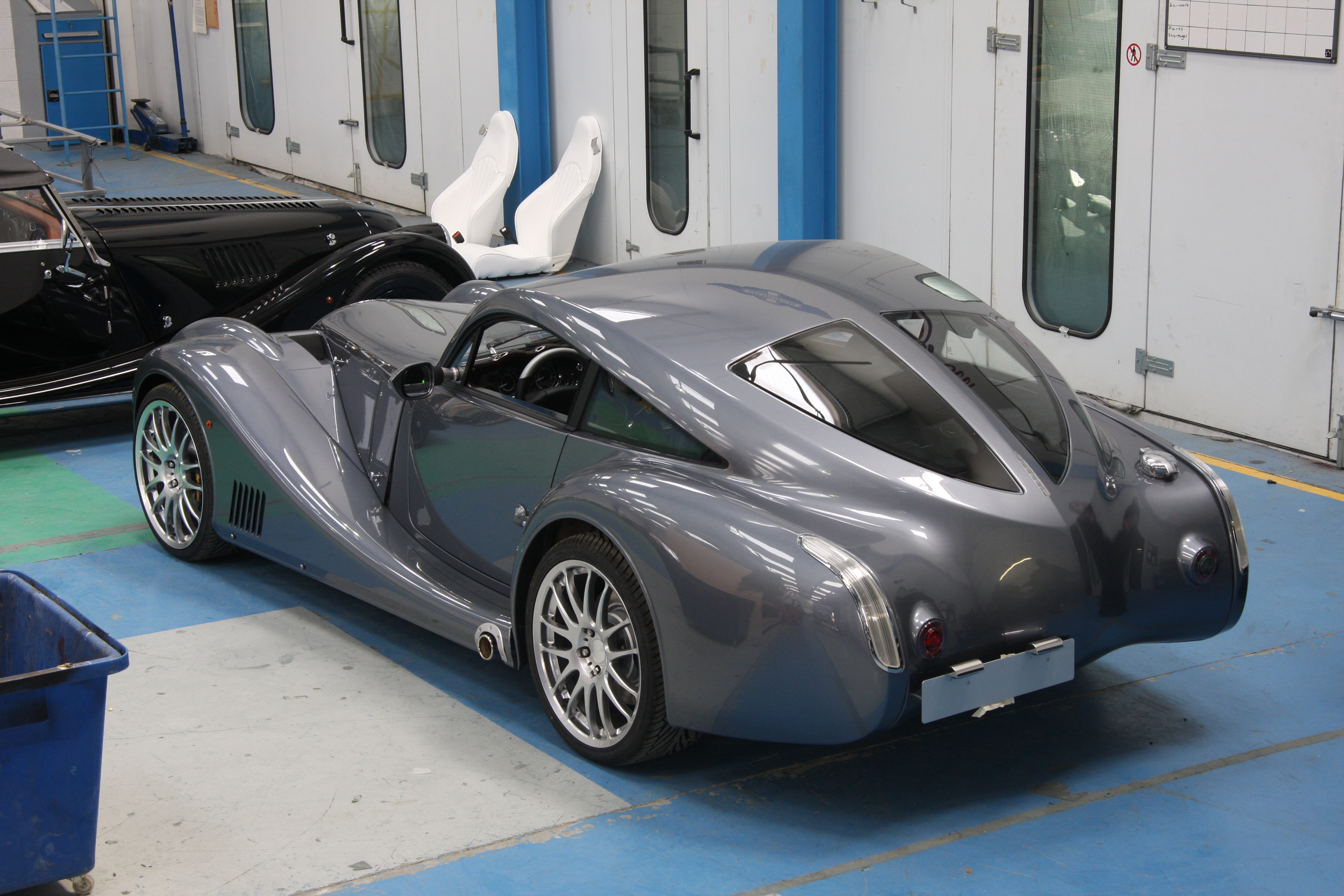
Morgan AeroMax, showing distinct boat tail rear

The Aero was followed by the Aeromax, a limited edition of 100 units produced between 2008 and early 2010. The Aeromax was a coupé variation of the Aero 8. Customers have included Richard Hammond, Rowan Atkinson and Paul O'Grady.

=== Morgan Aero SuperSports ===
The Morgan Aero SuperSports is a targa-roofed version of the AeroMax, sharing its bonded aluminium chassis and lower bodywork with the coupe. It was launched at the 2009 Pebble Beach car show in California. Its cancellation was announced in March 2015.

=== Morgan Aero Coupé ===
The Morgan Aero Coupé is a hard top version of the Aero SuperSports, sharing its bonded aluminium chassis, bodywork, suspension and engine. It was launched at the end of 2011. It is not available in the United States. Its cancellation was announced in March 2015.

=== Morgan Plus 8 ===
The new Morgan Plus 8 is a classic body version of the Aero SuperSports and Aero Coupé, sharing their bonded aluminium chassis, bodywork, suspension and engine. It was launched at the end of 2011. It is not available in the United States. In 2019, Morgan announced its cancellation.

=== Morgan Plus E ===
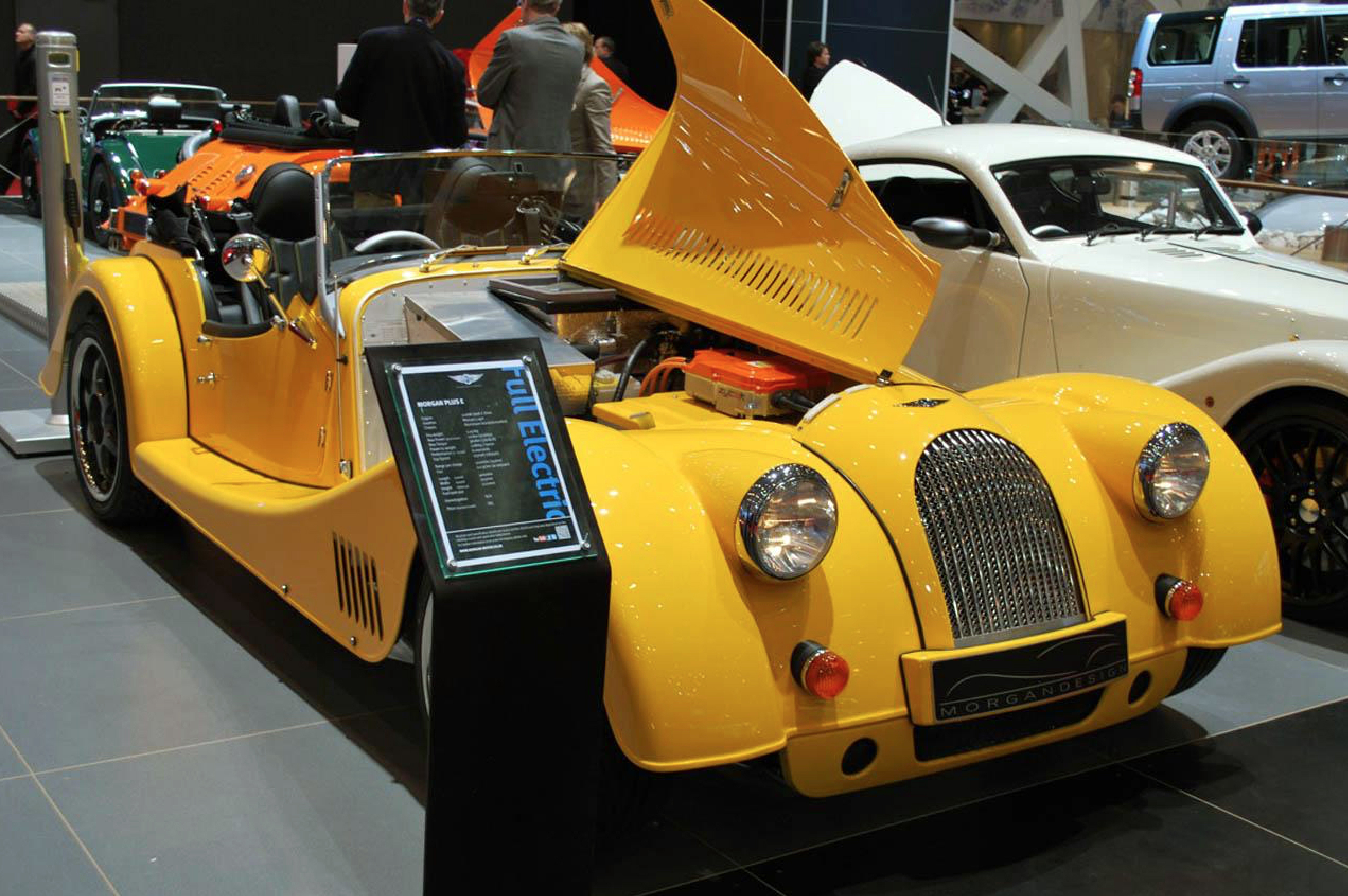
Morgan Plus E

The Morgan Plus E is an electric version of a classical Morgan, a joint project of Morgan with Zytek and Radshape (Radshape Sheet Metal Ltd.), funded by the UK government. It was displayed at the 2012 Geneva Motor Show. It has never been produced and the project was abandoned.

=== Morgan Eva GT ===
Based on the same chassis as the Aero Supersports, the Eva GT would have been a 2+2 grand tourer, and as such it would be longer in the body. The Eva GT would use BMW N54 twin-turbo straight-6 producing 302 bhp, Euro-6 emissions compliant. Shown at Pebble Beach in clay in 2010 and expected to go on sale in 2012, deposits have been taken since 2010. At the end of 2011, Morgan announced that it would use new magnesium technology for the body and therefore it would not be represented until 2014 with deliveries after that. In 2013 dealers confirmed that the EvaGT had been cancelled.

=== Morgan 3-Wheeler ===
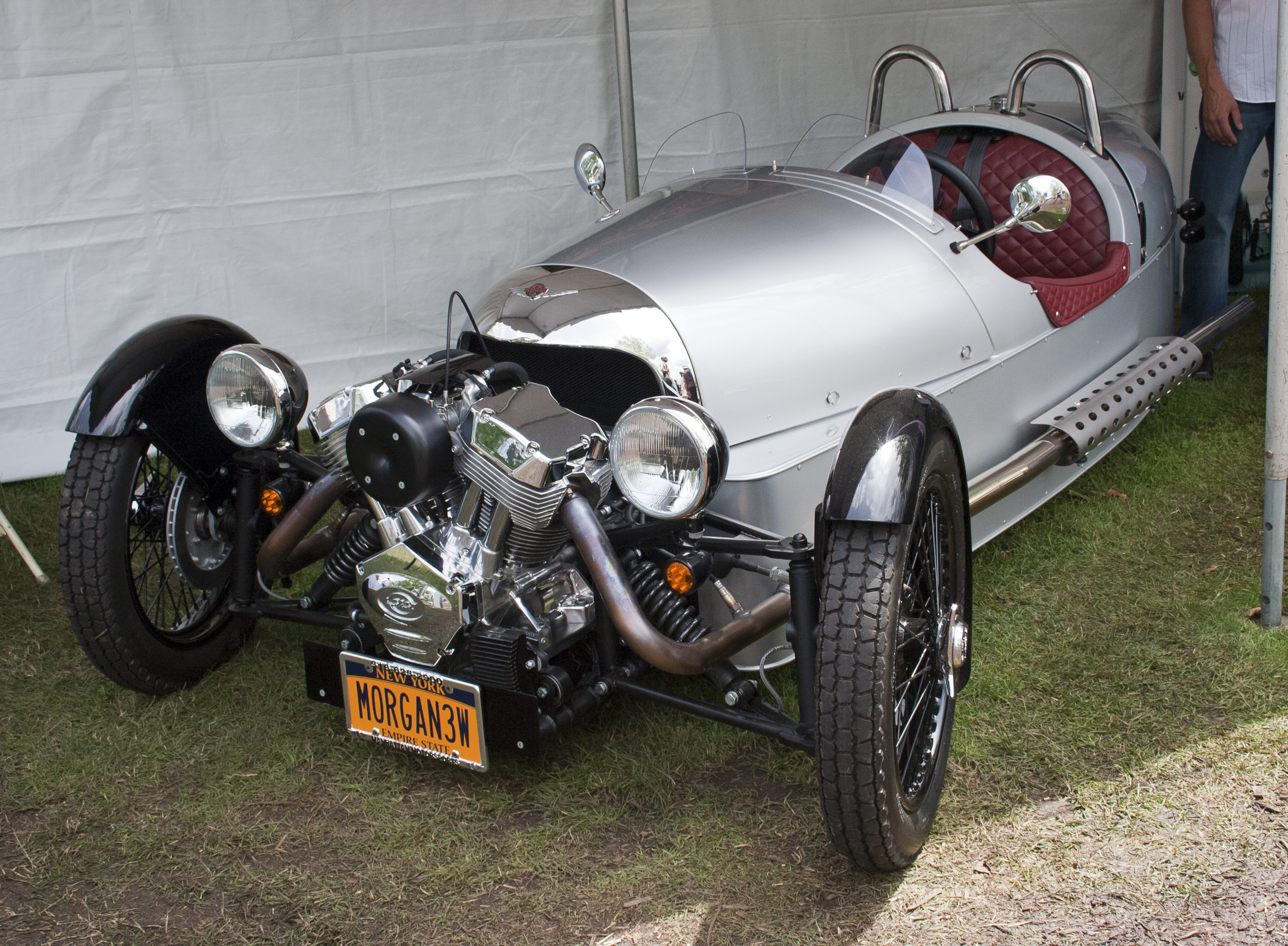
Morgan 3-wheeler (2012)

The Morgan Motor Company announced that they would launch the "3 Wheeler" in 2011 at the Geneva Motor Show. The 3 Wheeler was initially said to have a Harley-Davidson Screaming Eagle V-twin engine and a Mazda 5-speed manual transmission, and was estimated to deliver 115 hp (86 kW) at the rear wheel. However, the prototype that was shown at Geneva had an S&S engine. Production three-wheelers turned out to have S&S engines. The kerb weight was originally estimated to be less than 500 kg (1,102 lb), but the final weight was tested at 550 kg (1,213 lb). The acceleration from zero to 60 mph (97 km/h) was estimated by Morgan as 4.5 seconds, with an (estimated) top speed of 115 mph (185 km/h). The three-wheeler is to be homologated as a motorcycle in the United States. The company states that 850 deposits have been taken since the announcement in 2011. Customer deliveries began in Europe in February 2012. US deliveries were not expected before June 2012, when the first imported three-wheeler was displayed in New York City and at the Greenwich Concours d'Elegance. The Morgan 3 Wheeler was featured in a Series 18 episode of UK motoring show Top Gear where presenter Richard Hammond selected the Morgan 3 Wheeler in a comparison of track-day cars. The 3 Wheeler won the "Not-A-Car of the Year 2011" in Top Gear magazine.

=== Morgan SP1 ===
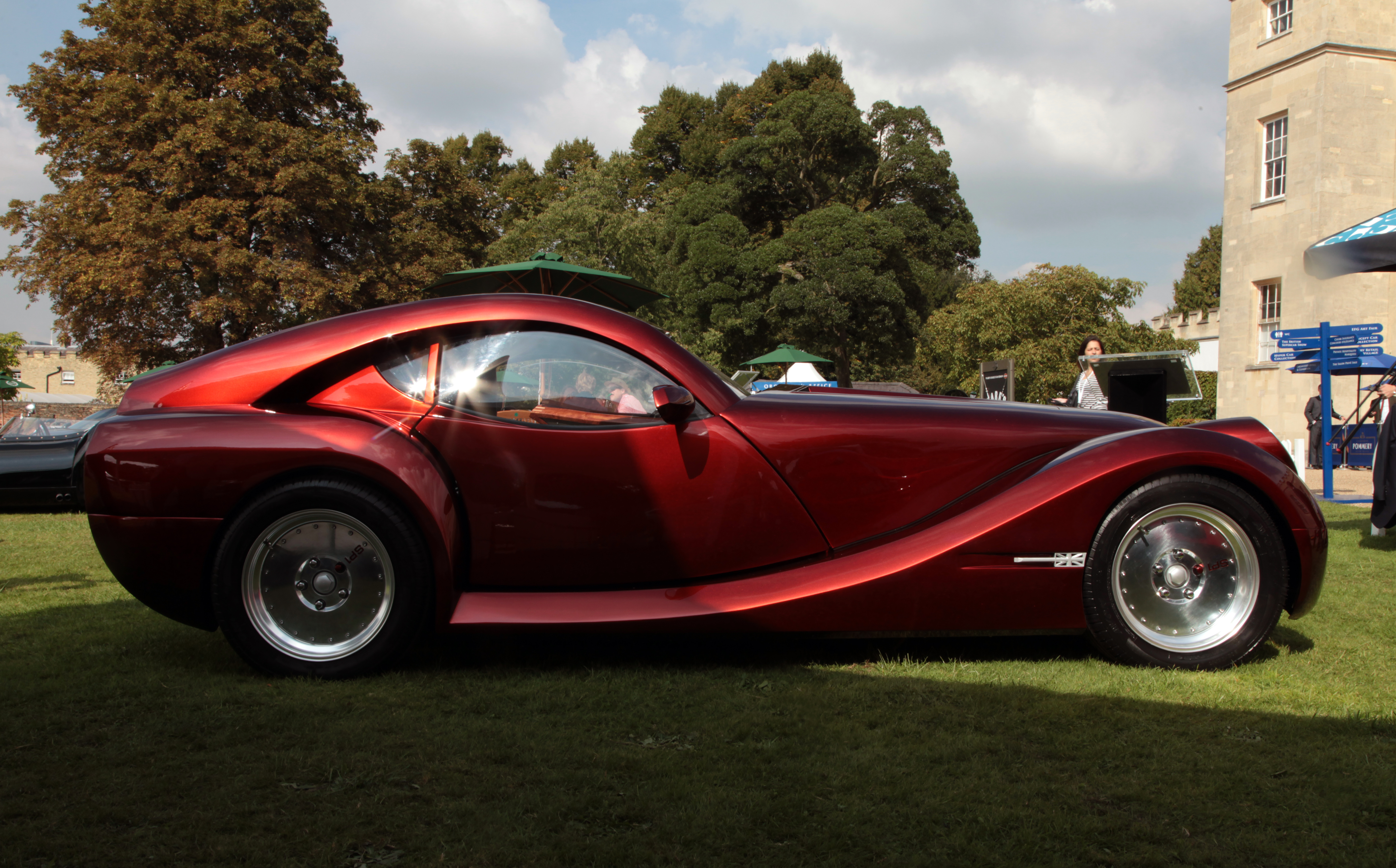
Morgan SP1

In September 2014, Morgan introduced the Morgan SP1 as well as its newly formed Special Projects division. The one-off coupe uses the same Ford 3.7L V6 as in the Morgan Roadster. The exterior is inspired by Morgan's LIFEcar concept and its egg-crate wooden frame is made of ash and African Bubinga red hardwood.

=== Morgan Plus Six ===
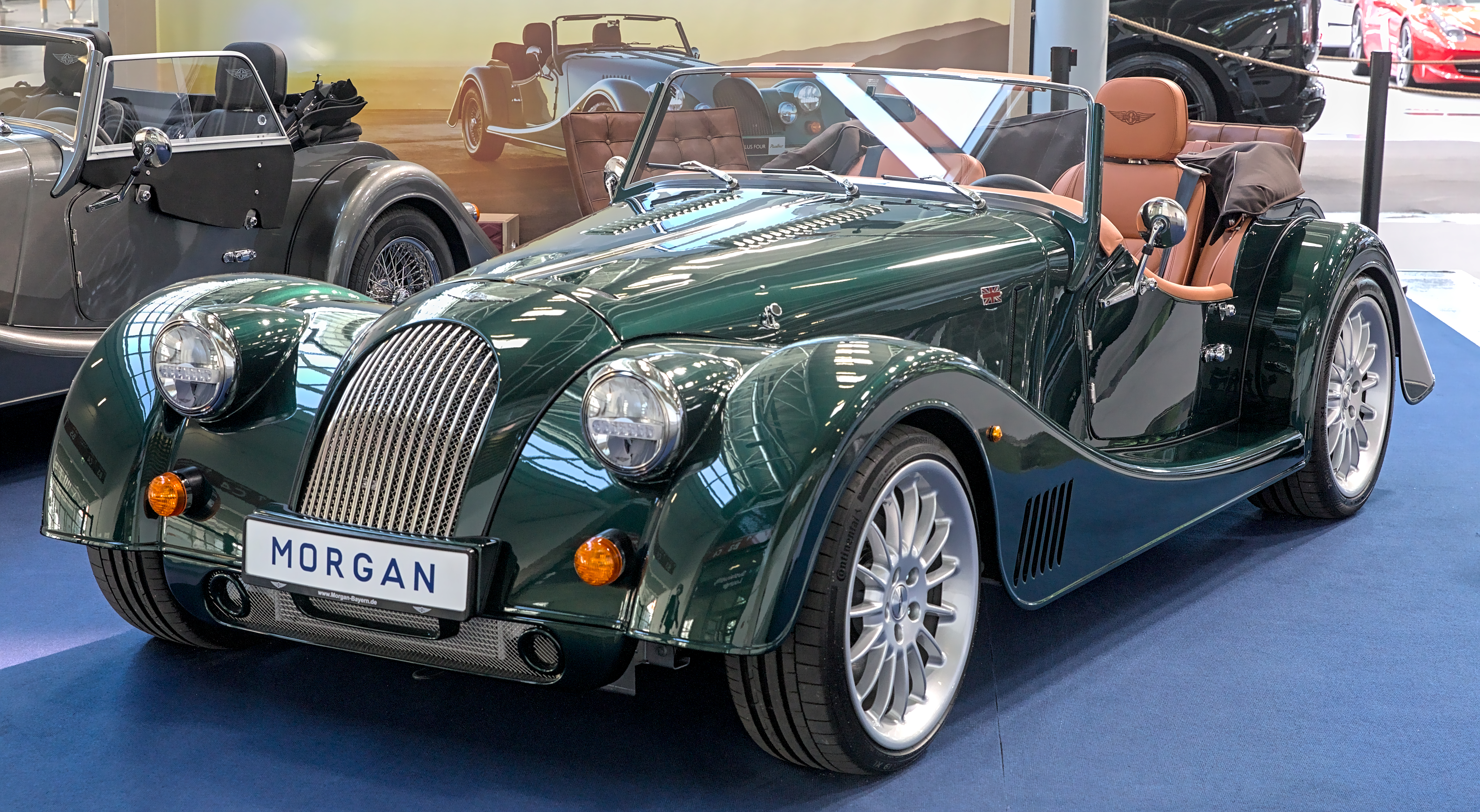
Morgan Plus Six

The Morgan Plus Six was announced in March 2019 at the Geneva Motor Show. Instead of the traditional Morgan ladder frame and sliding-pillar suspension, it has a new bonded aluminium chassis and all-independent suspension design, with double wishbones at the front and a multi-link system for the rear. The Plus Six is powered by a BMW B58 turbocharged in-line six-cylinder petrol engine, producing 335 bhp, coupled to an eight-speed ZF automatic transmission.

=== Morgan Plus Four ===
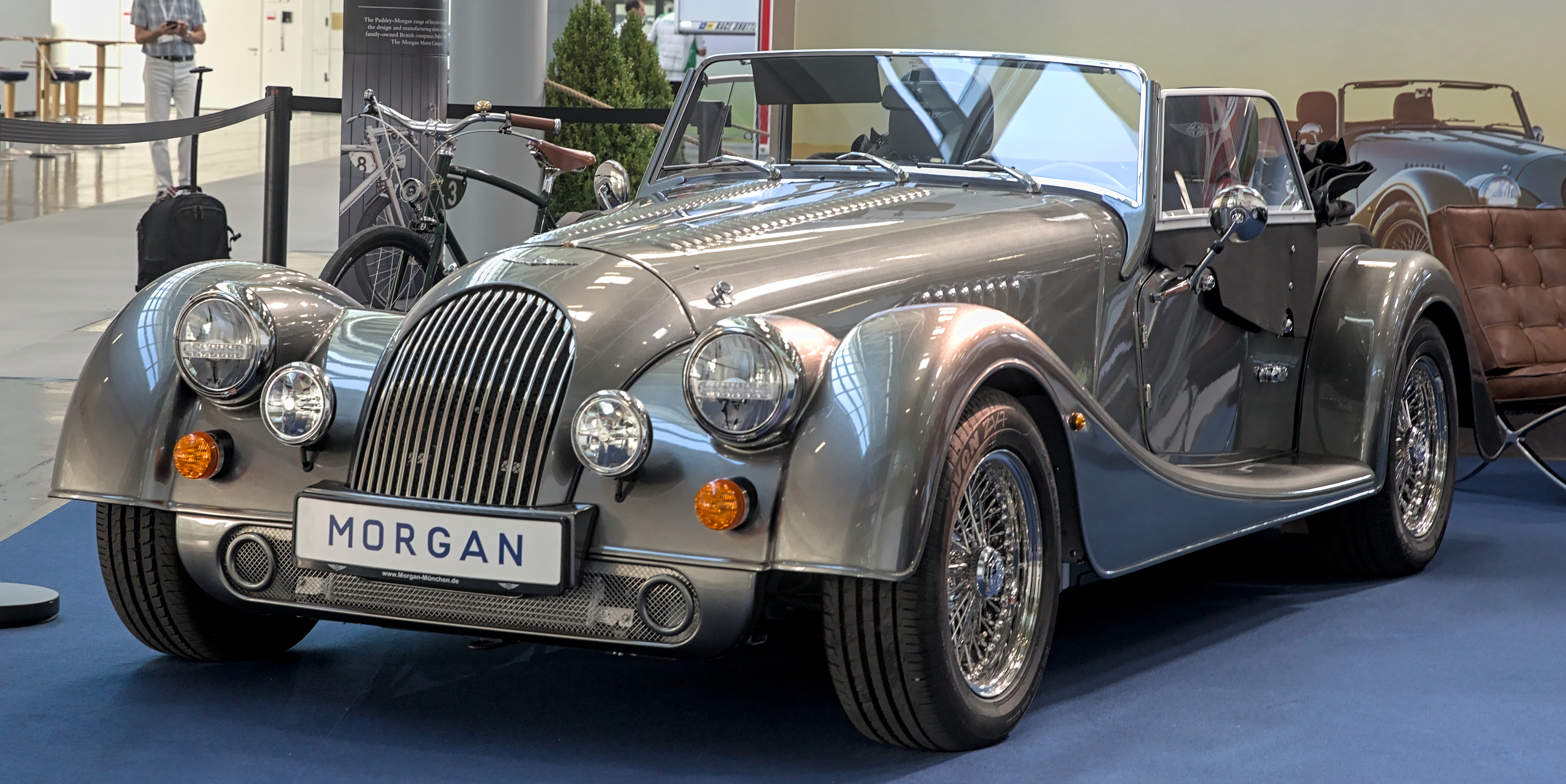
Morgan Plus Four

The Morgan Plus Four was revealed online in March 2020. Like the Plus Six, it uses a "CX-Generation" bonded aluminium chassis and all-independent suspension design. The Plus Four is powered by a BMW B48 turbocharged in-line four-cylinder petrol engine producing 255 bhp, with either a six-speed manual transmission or an eight-speed automatic transmission.

=== Morgan Super 3 ===
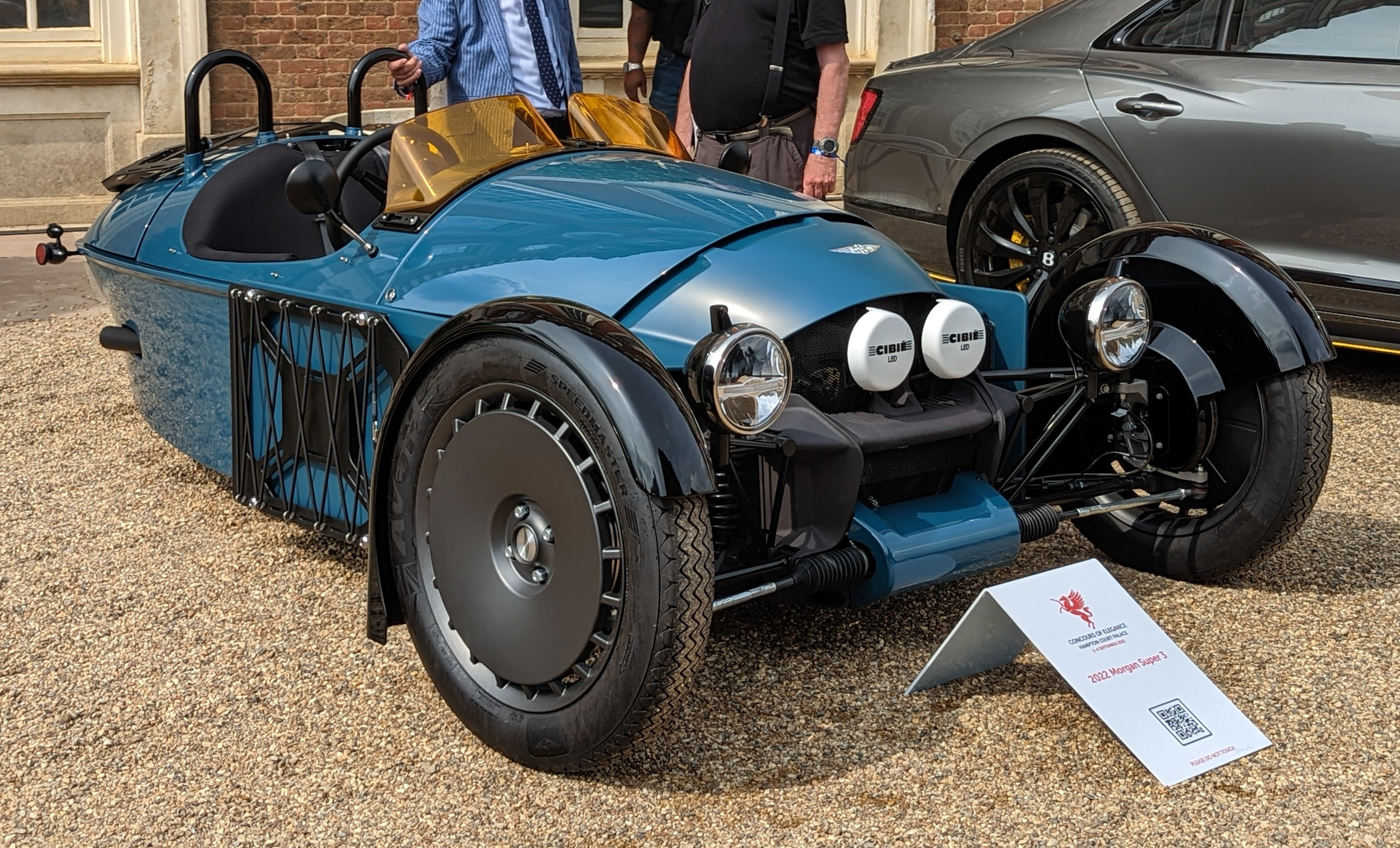
Morgan Super 3

The Morgan Super 3 is a three-wheeled roadster released as a successor to the Morgan 3-Wheeler that was discontinued a year earlier. It uses the same platform as Morgan's Plus Four and Plus Six models, but notably lacks wood panels.

=== Morgan Midsummer ===
Morgan Midsummer

The Morgan Midsummer was a limited-release barchetta released in 2024. The Midsummer was a collaborative effort between Morgan and Italian design firm Pininfarina. Only fifty units were manufactured, all of which sold before the price was announced.

=== Morgan Supersport ===
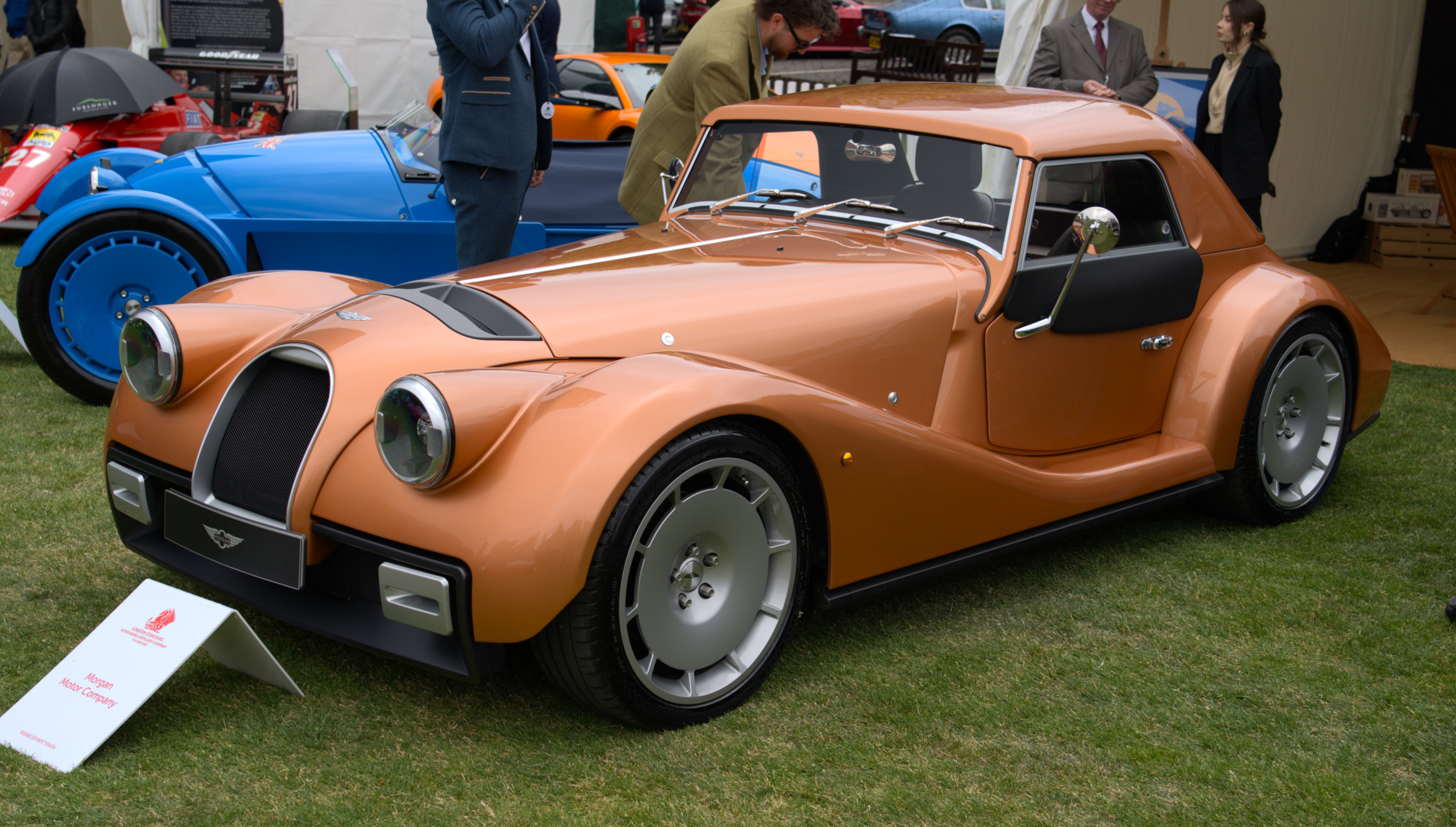
Morgan Supersport

The Morgan Supersport was revealed in March 2025 at a launch event held at the company's Pickersleigh Road factory. The launch event was broadcast live online and was hosted by Richard Hammond. The Supersport features a new CXV aluminium platform. The company describes it as a "contemporary" redesign of its timeless design, aiming to target a "wider" demographic.

In April 2026, the company launched the Supersport 400, a high-performance model of the Supersport. The new model is the manufacturer's most powerful car with 402bhp and a top speed of 180mph.

== Availability in the United States ==
For part of the 1950s and 1960s, the United States provided the company with its largest market worldwide, taking up to 85% of all production. This ended with the first wave of US safety and emission regulations in 1971. For many years (1974 to 1992), all Morgans imported into the United States were converted to run on propane as fuel to pass the US emissions regulations. However, this conversion, along with bringing the cars into compliance with US vehicle safety legislation, was carried out by the dealership, and not by the factory, making the cars grey market vehicles.

However, when the Rover Group re-certified their V8 engine for use in the Range Rover 4x4 sold in the US, Morgan was able to use the same engine for a fully US-compliant stock Morgan from 1992 to 1996, and again from 1998 to 2004. In 2005, the engine was replaced with the US-version of another traditionally shaped model (with a V6), called the Roadster.

In 2002, Morgan centralised its international compliancy development and regulatory interaction in-house. In 2005, its right to import its classic models ceased when supplies of its necessary airbag were exhausted and no replacement was developed. In 2006, a request for an airbag exemption to the US National Highway Traffic Safety Administration was refused, and the import of classic Morgans ceased.

In 2005, the new Morgan Aero 8 model (versions 2 and 3) received a three-year exemption from rear impact non-compliance, along with a separate exemption for compliance with "advanced airbag requirements". The rear-impact exemption lapsed in May 2008 without further application. Morgan has indicated to its US dealers that it plans to re-apply for US certification for some model at as yet an undetermined date in the future.

In April 2012, the new Morgan 3-Wheeler was showcased at the New York International Auto Show, at the Jacob Javits Center, by Bobby Singh and Gideon Lang-Laddie of Manhattan Motorsports. This was the first time in 10 years that Morgan had had a presence at the largest of the American car shows and was the first US specification Morgan 3-Wheeler in the United States. The Morgan 3 Wheeler was voted one of the "Hottest Cars Of The Show" by G4TV.

In May 2012, Manhattan Motorsports took delivery of Charles Morgan's Superdry edition Morgan 3-Wheeler and prepared it for its first major American trial. This vehicle was driven across the States, from New York to Los Angeles by Charles Morgan and his wife, covering 3000 miles, in the Gumball 3000. At the end of the seven-day drive, the Morgan 3 Wheeler was awarded the "Spirit of Gumball" prize.

The Morgan 3 Wheeler sold successfully in the United States until it ceased production in 2019. The 3 Wheeler's predecessor, Super 3, was made available in the United States in 2023 following its U.K. and European launch in 2022. Homologated as a motor tricycle, the Super 3 does not come under the same homologation requirements as conventional automobiles.

In 2025, Morgan made the Plus Four available for the United States market after a five-year effort to homologize the car. The Plus Four is compliant with the Fixing America's Surface Transportation Act, which allows for low-volume manufacturers (less than five thousand per year) to sell replicas of vehicles sold at least 25 years prior to sale. The exemption allows the car to avoid certain safety regulations (provided no more than 325 vehicles per year are sold) while requiring compliance with modern emissions and lighting regulations. The only transmission available for the US market is the automatic.

== General characteristics ==
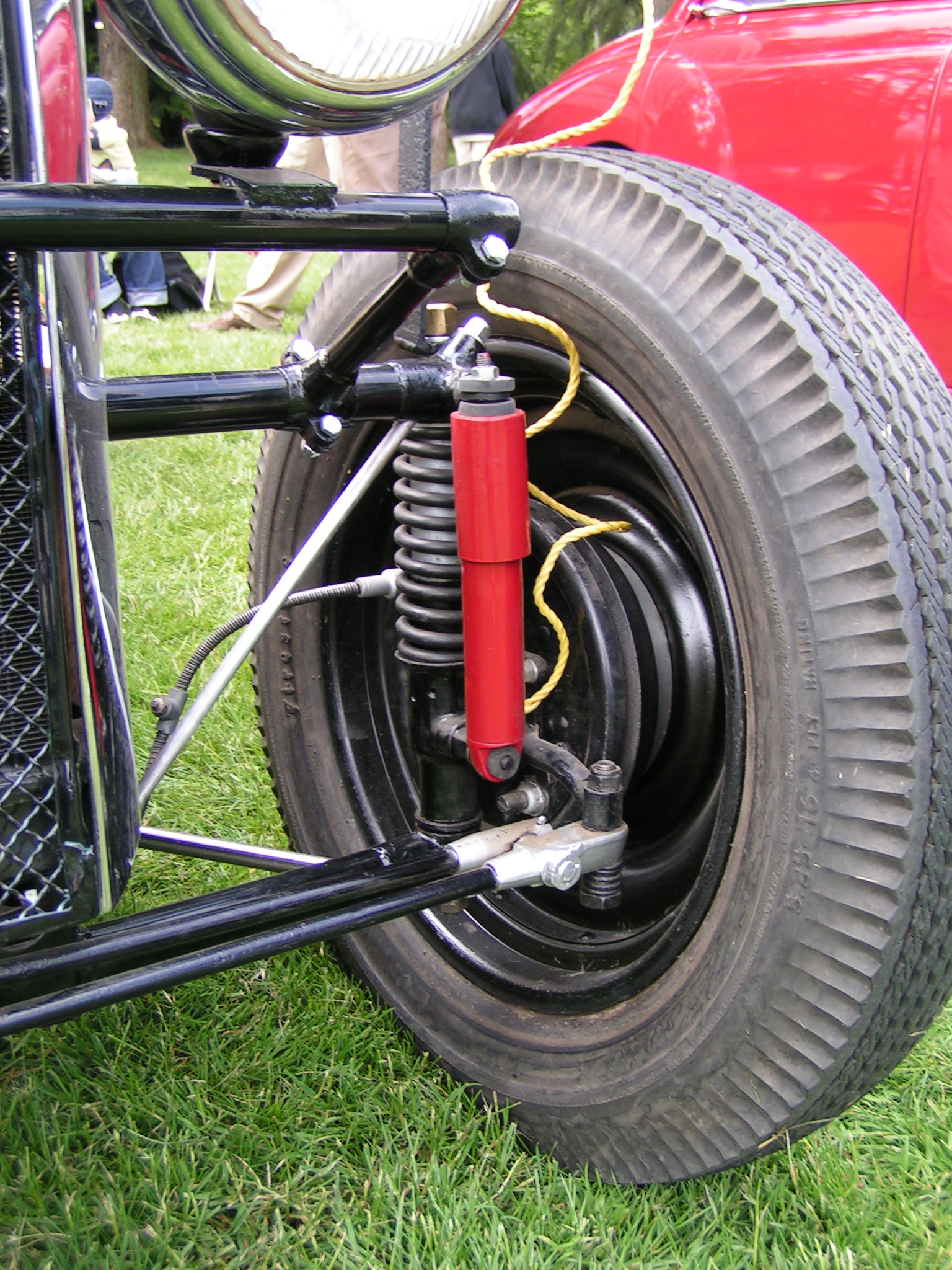
Traditional Morgan sliding pillar suspension

In spite of their traditional design, Morgans have always had sporting or "sports car" performance, due to their extremely low weight.

Among their Australian enthusiasts, Morgans are affectionately known as "Moggies".

=== Suspension ===
H.F.S. Morgan's 1909 runabout used sliding pillar suspension, an independent front suspension system with each front wheel mounted on a stub axle able to slide up and down a fixed pillar that also acts as the kingpin and supported by a spring and external shock absorber (damper). One advantage is reduced unsprung weight, theoretically allowing the tyre and wheel to better respond to road surface irregularities. The Morgan system is described as an 'inverted' sliding pillar, as the pillar is fixed and the hub carrier slides over it. Earlier systems had the wheel carried on the pillar, sliding through a bush on the axle.

Morgan used developments of this suspension system throughout its existence, and it is still used on Morgan's "classic" line, although not on the Aero 8 or its derivatives. It has been cancelled, along with all the Morgan Classic line, in 2019. However, some "classics", shipped in parts to avoid the need for normal compliancy, will be shipped to the US, and assembled there for an indefinite period.

== Models ==
- 1909 Runabout
- 1911–1939 V-Twin 3-wheeler
- 1932–1952 F-Series 3-wheeler
- 1936–2018 4/4 Two-Seater and Four-Seater
- 1950–1969 Plus 4
- 1964–1967 Plus 4 Plus
- 1965-1967 Morgan +4 Competition two seater
- 1968–2004 (and 2012–19) Plus 8
- 1985–2000 Plus 4
- 2001–2009 Aero 8
- 2004–2012 V6 Roadster
- 2005–2020 Plus 4
- 2006 Morgan LIFEcar
- 2008–2009 AeroMax
- 2009–2018 Morgan 4/4 Sport
- 2010–2015 Aero SuperSports
- 2010–cancelled Morgan Eva GT
- 2011–cancelled Morgan Plus E
- 2011–2012 Morgan Plus 4 Supersports
- 2006–2008 Morgan Anniversary 4/4
- 2012–2015 Aero Coupe
- 2012–2021 Morgan 3-Wheeler
- 2012–2019 Morgan Aero 8
- 2012–present Roadster 3.7
- 2015–2019 Morgan Aero 8
- 2018 Morgan EV3
- 2019–2025 Morgan Plus Six
- 2020–present Morgan Plus Four
- 2021 Morgan Plus Four CX-T
- 2021 Morgan Plus 8 GTR
- 2022–present Morgan Super 3
- 2024–present Morgan Midsummer
- 2025–present Morgan Supersport

== Motorsports ==
1928 Morgan Super Aero
1928 Morgan Super Aero at Goodwood Festival of Speed 2009

Morgan Aero Supersports at Goodwood Festival of Speed 2010

Morgan cars can be found in many areas of motorsport, from club and historic racing to more prominent examples, including the Le Mans 24hr race. A notable Morgan racecar was the Aero 8 GT car that campaigned in 2008 Britcar races and the 2008 Britcar 24hrs at Silverstone, prepared and run by Mark Bailey Racing.

Pescarolo Sport rebranded its Le Mans Prototype as a Morgan for the 2012 24 Hours of Le Mans, partly to mark the 50th anniversary of a class victory for a Morgan Plus Four Super Sports at Le Mans.

== See also ==
- List of car manufacturers of the United Kingdom
- List of motorized trikes
