= Morgan Plus E =

Electric concept car by Morgan

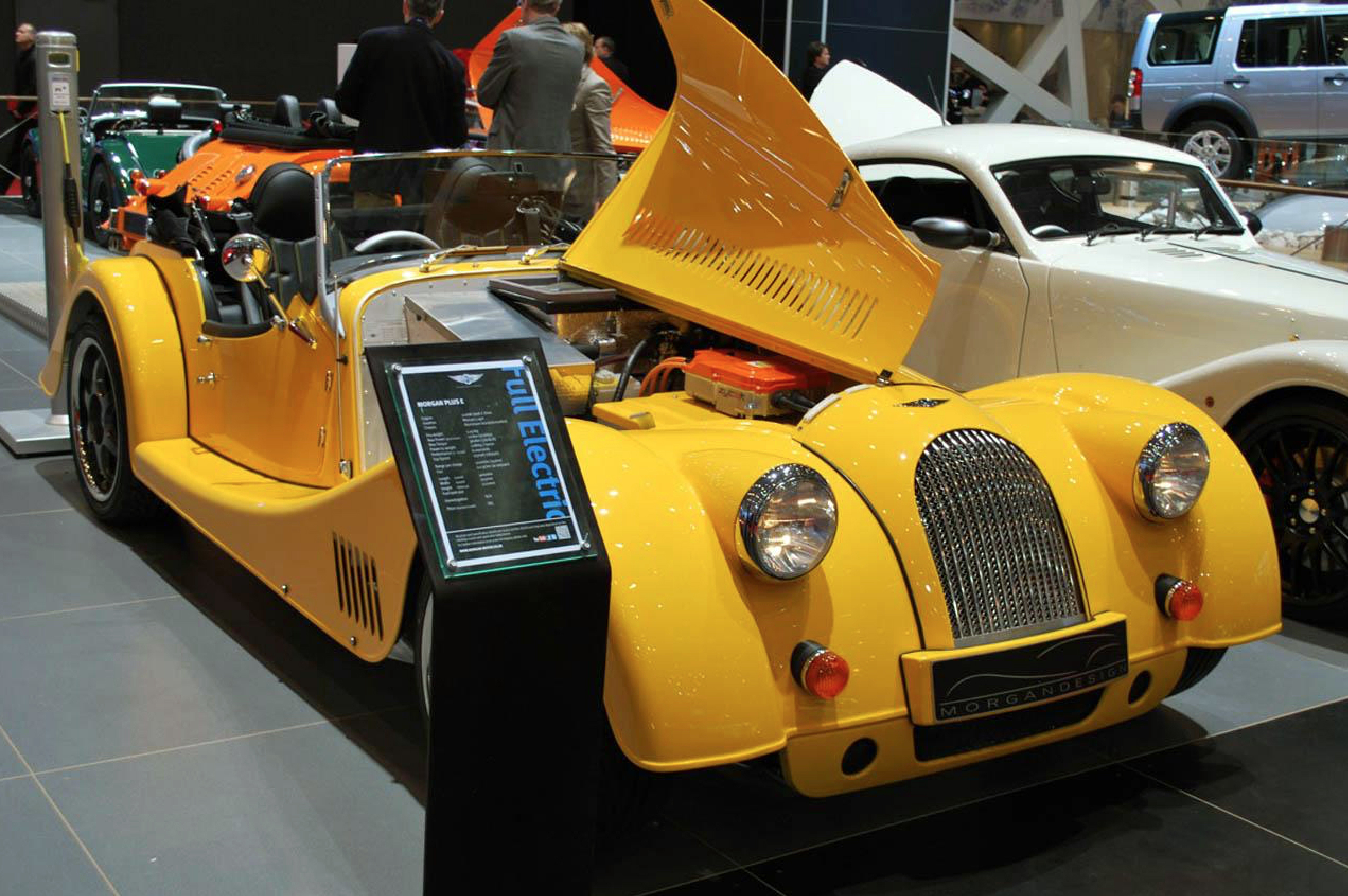
- The Morgan Plus E on display in 2012

Overview
- Manufacturer: Morgan
- Production: 2012
- Designer: Morgan; Zytek

Body and chassis
- Body style: 2-door roadster
- Layout: Transverse rear-engine, rear-wheel drive

Powertrain
- Transmission: 5-speed manual
- Battery: 70 kWh lithium-ion
- Range: 120 miles (190 km)

Dimensions
- Kerb weight: 1,250 kg (2,756 lb)

The Morgan Plus E was an electric concept car developed by British car manufacturer Morgan. It was unveiled at the 2012 Geneva International Motor Show but the project was abandoned and no units were produced.

== Overview ==
The Plus E was designed by Morgan Motor Company in conjunction with British firm Zytek who provided the electric drivetrain. The project was funded by the UK government, receiving over £400,000 for research and development. The car was reportedly developed and shown to gauge interest but no additional units have been produced.

== Specifications ==
The Plus E is built on the same chassis as Morgan's Plus 8 model, but features a 70 kilowatt Zytek engine instead of a V8. Electric vehicles typically do not include a gearbox, however, the Plus E includes a five-speed transmission and a clutch pedal. Along with Rytek, the project was supported by the British company Radshape who helped design and produce the aluminum chassis.
