= F-Series 3-wheeler =

Three-wheeled car produced by the Morgan Motor Company

F-Series 3-wheeler

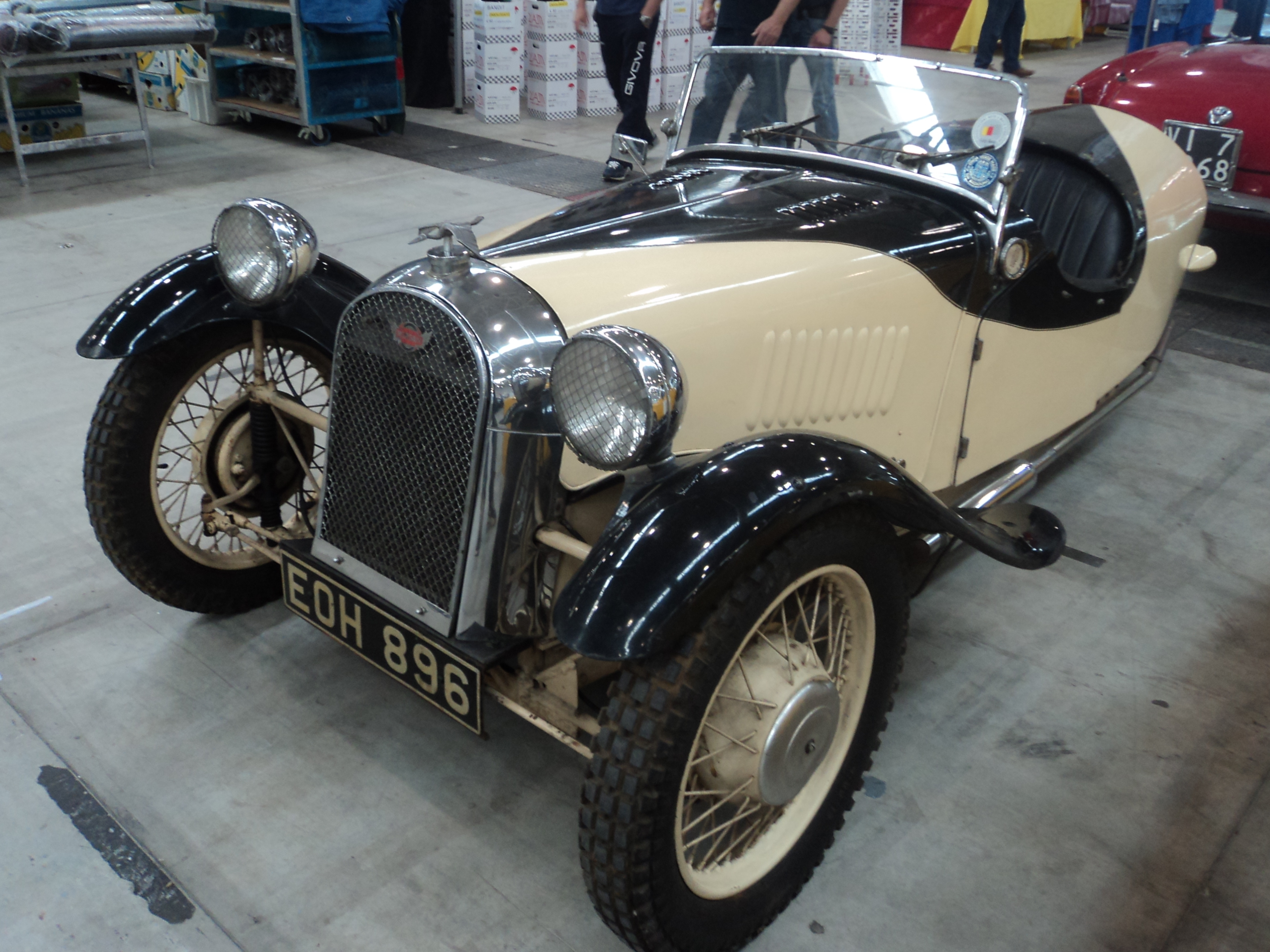
F-2 (two-seater)

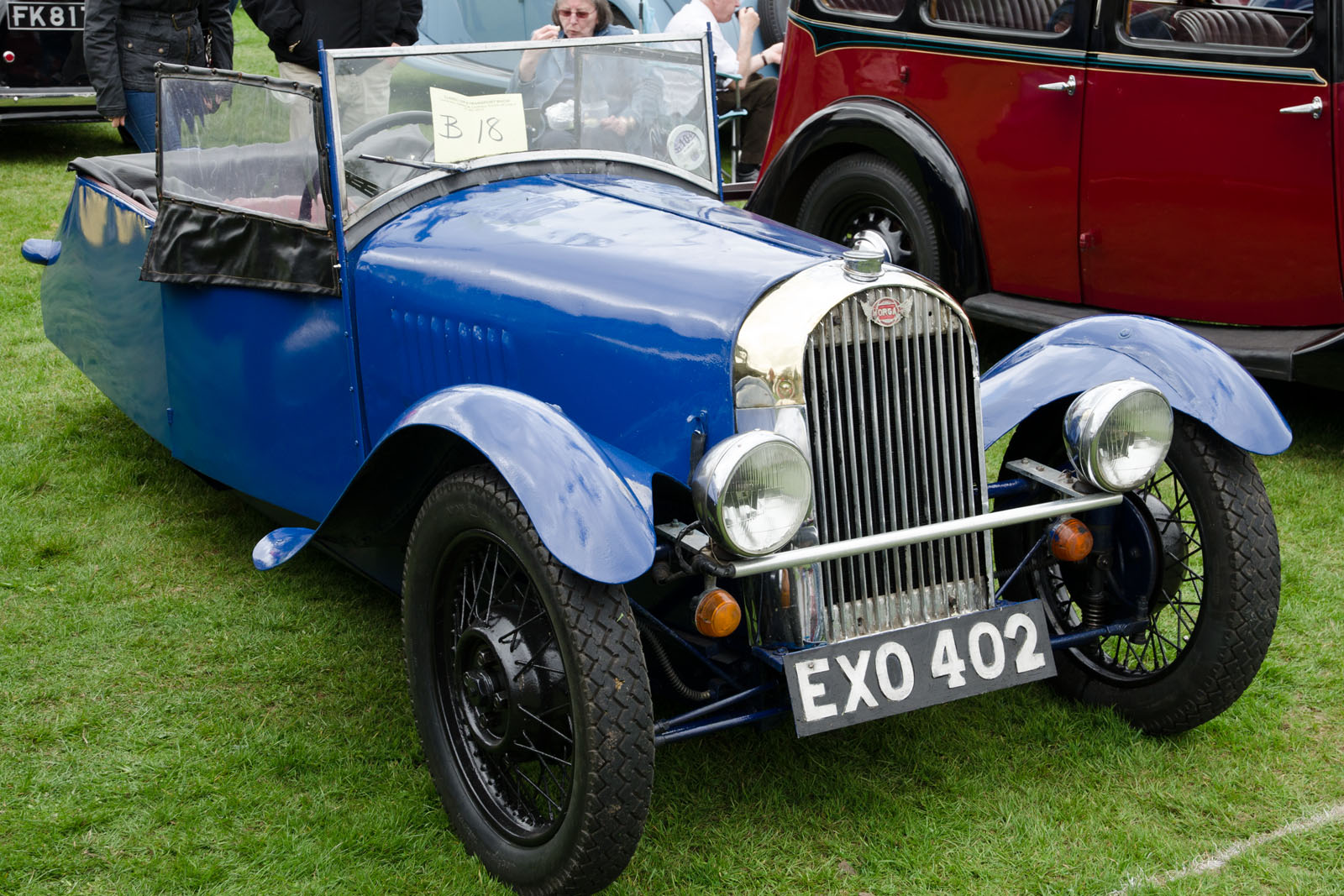
F-4 (four-seater)

The Morgan F-Series 3-Wheeler is a model of 3-wheeled car. It was produced by the Morgan Motor Company between the mid- 1930s and 1952. The car was powered by Ford 8hp and 10hp sidevalve engines (as used in the Ford Model Y), instead of the V-twin motorcycle engines that had been used in previous Morgans (typically from JAP, Anzani, or Blackburne); as another new departure, the F-Series had a new pressed-steel chassis.

== Models ==
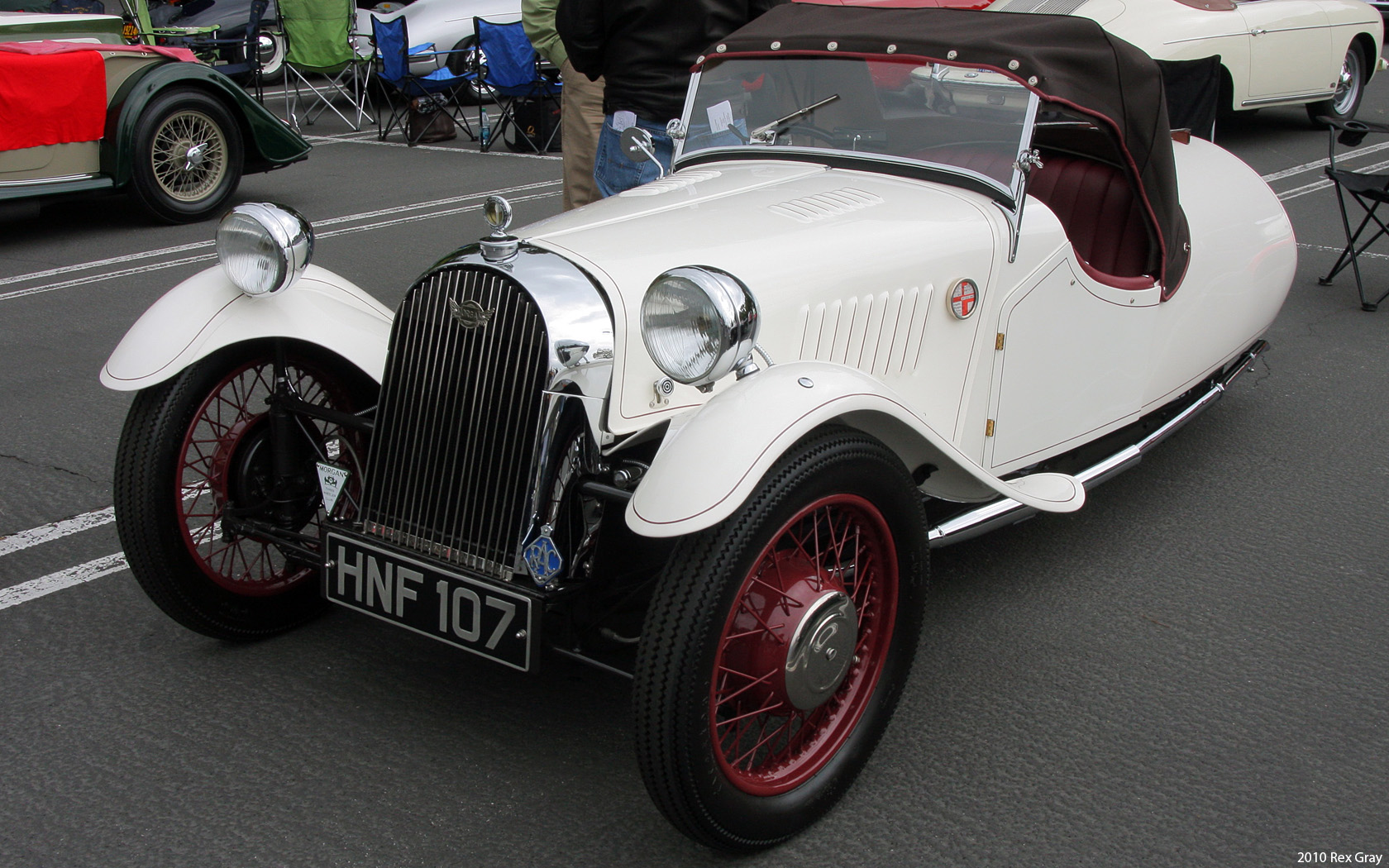
F Super (two-seater)

The four-seater Morgan F-4 was introduced in 1933 at the Olympia Motor Cycle Show. The two-seat F-2 was introduced in 1935, and the F Super, which had a more sporting performance and image with its cycle-type wings and louvred bonnet tops, in 1937. During the models' lifetime, Morgan's production of 4-wheeled cars was ramping up and 3-wheeler production reducing until 1952 when the last 3-wheeler, a Ford-engined "F"-Super, was built. The company then focused exclusively on 4-wheeled designs until 2012, when the Morgan 3 Wheeler was introduced.

== Copies ==
The 3-wheeler Morgan has been widely emulated; many 3-wheeler kit car models are based on the Morgan design.
