= Morgan Eva GT =

Overview
- Manufacturer: Morgan Motor Company

Body and chassis
- Body style: Grand tourer

Powertrain
- Engine: BMW N54
- Transmission: 6-speed manual or automatic

Dimensions
- Kerb weight: 1,250 kg (2,756 lb)

The Morgan Eva GT was a proposed 2+2 grand tourer to be developed by Morgan Motor Company of Malvern, Worcestershire, United Kingdom.

Launched at the 2010 Pebble Beach Concours d'Elegance show in California with a display of a clay mockup, it was to share the chassis of the Aeromax SuperSports, but with an elongated body. The car also was to have a 302 bhp (225 kW) twin-turbo straight six, making the car Euro 6-emissions compliant. The car's official press release noted it was expected to achieve 40 mpg and would have been offered with a 6-speed automatic or 6-speed manual transmission, and rear wheel drive only. With aluminum body panels, Morgan expected the car to weigh 1,250 kg (2,756 lb). Along with these specifications it was speculated the Eva GT would accelerate from 0-60 mph (97 km/h) in 4.5 seconds, with a top speed of 170 mph (274 km/h). The car is named after Charles Morgan's daughter Eva.

It was expected to be priced between £70,000–£85,000; deposits were originally taken for delivery in 2012.

However, in 2012, the Company announced that its deliveries would be delayed to 2014 to allow for the use of magnesium alloy technology. The company reported that they had spent £1.4 million in such development.

In early 2013, dealers confirmed that the model had been cancelled. Customer's £5000 deposits would be returned when requested or could be used for the purchase of a different model.
