= Darmont =

French automobile manufacturer

- Founded: 1919
- Defunct: 1939
- Headquarters: Courbevoie
- Key people: Robert Darmont, André Darmont
- Products: Cyclecars/Automobiles

Darmont (French: [daʁmɔ̃]) was a French automobile manufacturer, based at Courbevoie in the Paris conurbation, and active between 1919 and 1939.

== The business ==
During the First World War, Robert Darmont started his business as an importer of Morgan three-wheelers from England. When peace broke out he set up an auto-making business in partnership with his brother André, operating from a workshop at Courbevoie in the western part of Paris. In 1921, the brothers obtained a licence to build Morgan three-wheelers in France, and a faithful replica, the Darmont-Morgan, was the result.

The manufacturer remained faithful to their three-wheeler formula until 1935 when they launched the V-Junior. With the outbreak of the Second World War Darmont was obliged to declare itself bankrupt.

== Cars ==
=== Darmont-Morgan ===
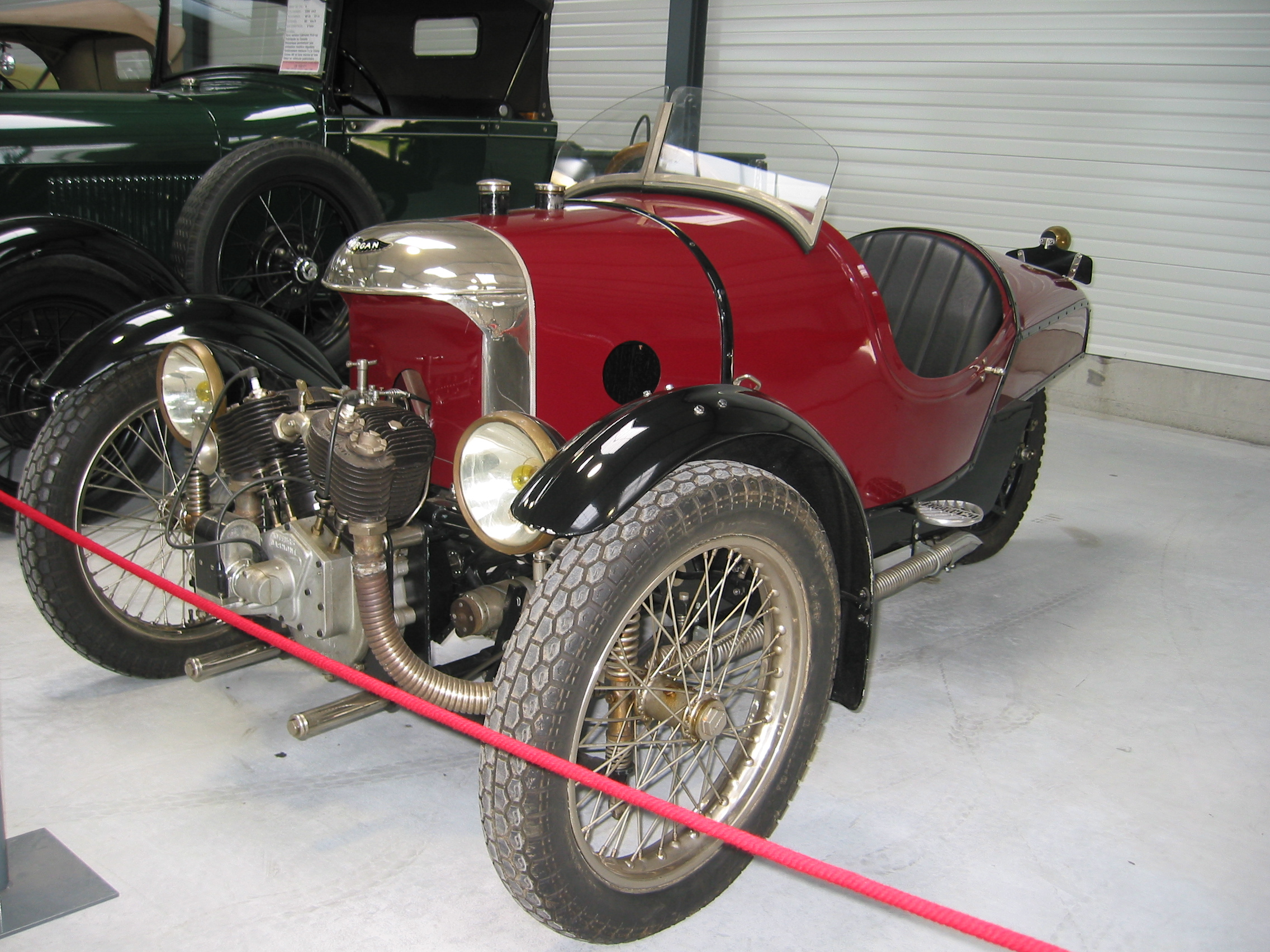
Darmont-Morgan from 1922

The Darmont-Morgan is virtually indistinguishable from the Morgan three-wheeler on which it was based. At the front, was an air-cooled V-2 cylinder 4-stroke motor tilted forward and with a capacity of 1084 cc, which was enough to power the vehicle to a top speed of about 125 km/h (78 mph). By the time of the October 1928 Paris Motor Show, the manufacturer was displaying a range of Morgan-based three wheelers, with a range of performance, levels, but most of them still with the 1084 cc engine of which both air-cooled and water-cooled variants were offered.

The little cars had a successful career in street races and mountain races such as the Mont Ventoux Rally. In 1921, Darmonts took the first three places in a road race from Paris to Nice.

=== Darmont Spécial ===
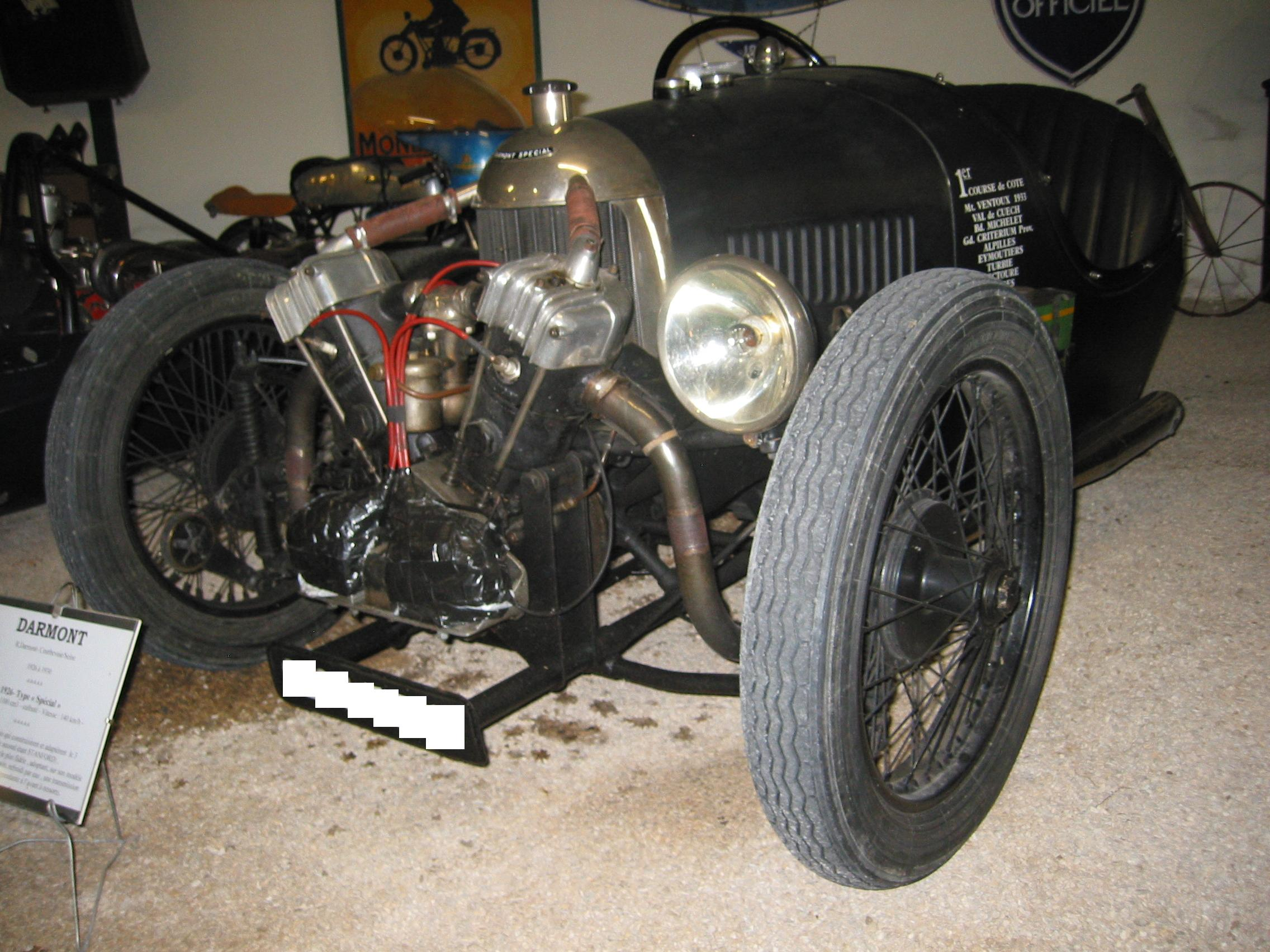
Darmont Spécial from 1926

The Darmont Spécial was produced from 1926, fitted with a water-cooled version of the V-2 cylinder engine and a claimed top speed of 150 km/h (93 mph). During the 1930s various more luxuriously fitted out variants of the (originally rather stripped-down) Spécial appeared.

The Darmont Étoile de France produced from 1932 closely resembled the Darmont Spécial.

=== Darmont V Junior ===
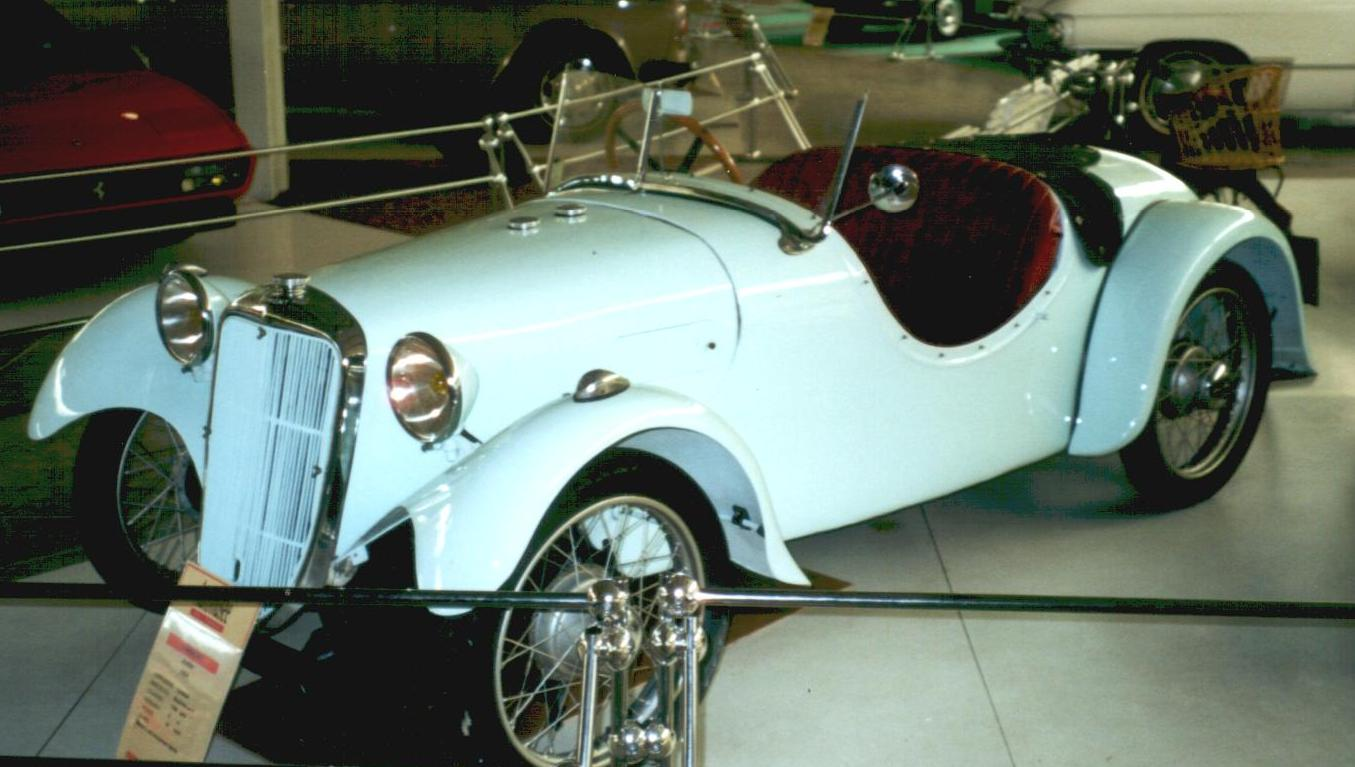
Darmont V Junior from 1935

The Darmont V Junior appeared in Autumn 1935. It was the first (and only) Darmont to come with four wheels. Reassuringly, however, the V-2 cylinder engine of approximately 1100 cc will have been familiar to those who knew the manufacturer's three-wheelers. It also remained faithful to some antiquated characteristics such as a hand-operated throttle mounted on the steering wheel, which closely connected the car to the by then unpopular cyclecars.
