= Roadster (car) =

Open two-seat car

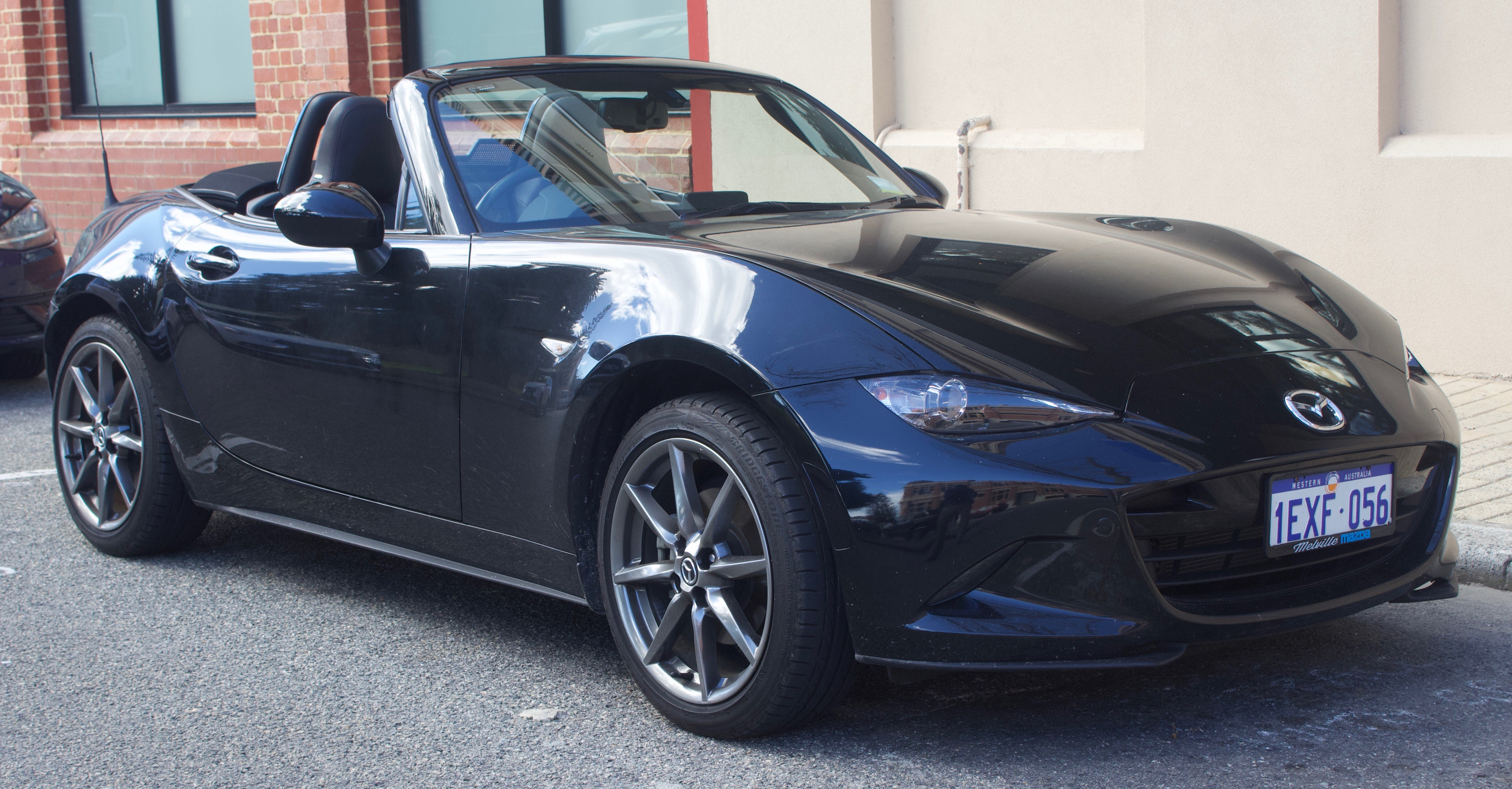
2016 Mazda MX-5

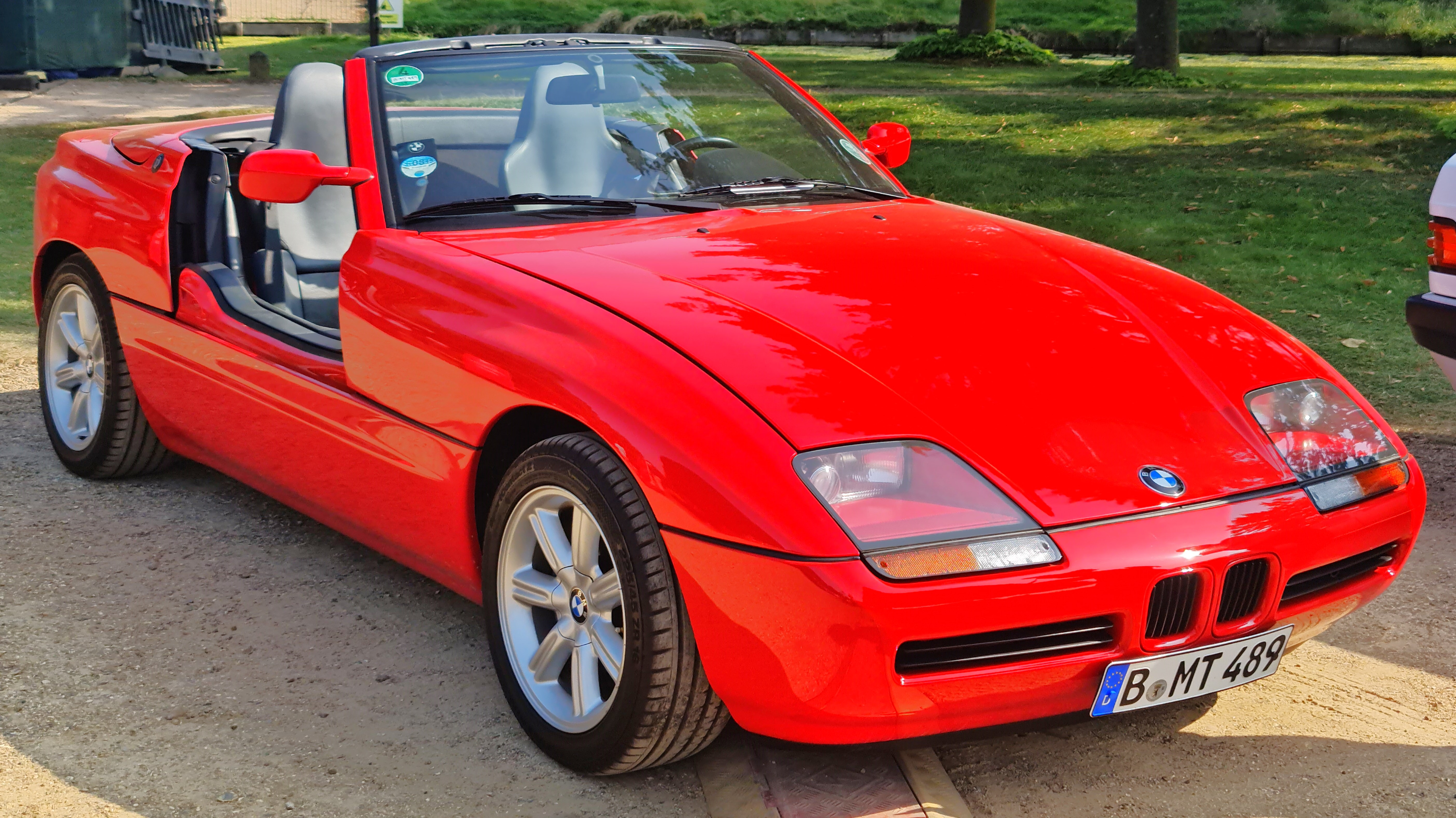
1991 BMW Z1

A roadster (also spider, spyder) is an open two-seat car with emphasis on sporting appearance or character. Initially an American term for a two-seat car with no weather protection, its usage has spread internationally and has evolved to include two-seat convertibles.

The roadster was also a style of racing car driven in United States Auto Club (USAC) Championship Racing, including the Indianapolis 500, in the 1950s and 1960s. This type of racing car was superseded by rear-mid-engine cars.

== Etymology ==
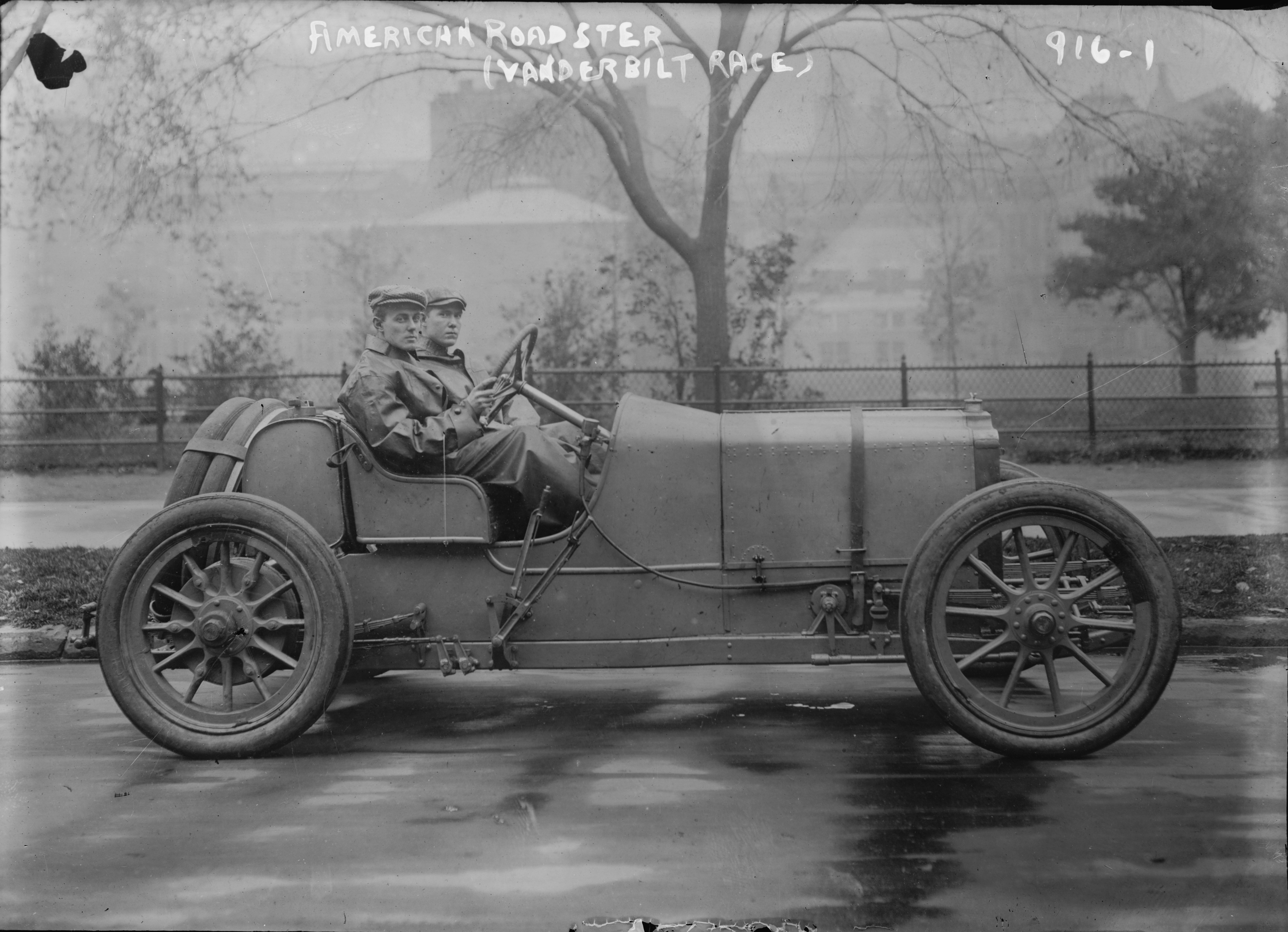
Early roadster competing for the Vanderbilt Cup

The term "roadster" originates in the United States, where it was used in the 19th century to describe a horse suitable for travelling. By the end of the century, the definition had expanded to include bicycles and tricycles. In 1916, the United States Society of Automobile Engineers defined a roadster as: "an open car seating two or three. It may have additional seats on running boards or in rear deck." Since it has a single row of seats, the main seat for the driver and passenger was usually further back in the chassis than it would have been in a touring car. Roadsters usually had a hooded dashboard.

In the United Kingdom, historically, the preferred terms were "open two-seater" and "two-seat tourer". Since the 1950s, the term "roadster" has also been increasingly used in the United Kingdom. It is noted that the optional 4-seat variant of the Morgan Roadster would not be technically considered a roadster.

The term "spider" or "spyder," sometimes used in names for convertible models, is said to come from before the automobile era. Some 19th-century lightweight horse-drawn phaetons had a small body and large wooden wheels with thin spokes; they were nicknamed "spiders" because of their appearance; the nickname was transferred to sports cars, although they did not look similar.

In 1962, Chevrolet introduced the Monza Spyder, a turbocharged version of its Corvair compact, available as a convertible or coupe. Although not a true 2 passenger vehicle, it featured upgraded suspension and other equipment to classify it as a "sporty car."

== History ==
Auto racing began with the first earnest contests in 1894 in Europe, and in 1895 in the United States. Some of the earliest race cars were purpose-built or stripped for the greatest speed, with minimal or no bodywork at all, leading to a body style aptly named 'speedster'. The cut-down speedster body-style really took form in the 1900s. After removing most of the body (and fenders), an empty platform on the ladder-frame chassis was mounted with one or two seats, a gas tank, and spare tyres.

American manufacturers Mercer and Stutz started offering ready-made racing speedsters, intentionally built to be driven to race(-track), raced, and driven back by their owner – essentially the first track day cars.

1890s to 1920s speedsters

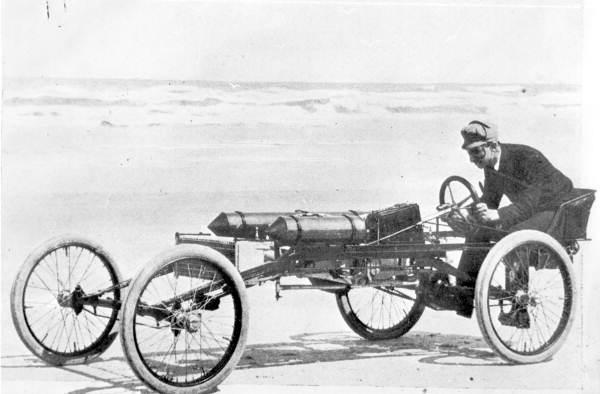
Ransom Olds' 1896/1897 "Pirate" racer was one of the first speedsters.

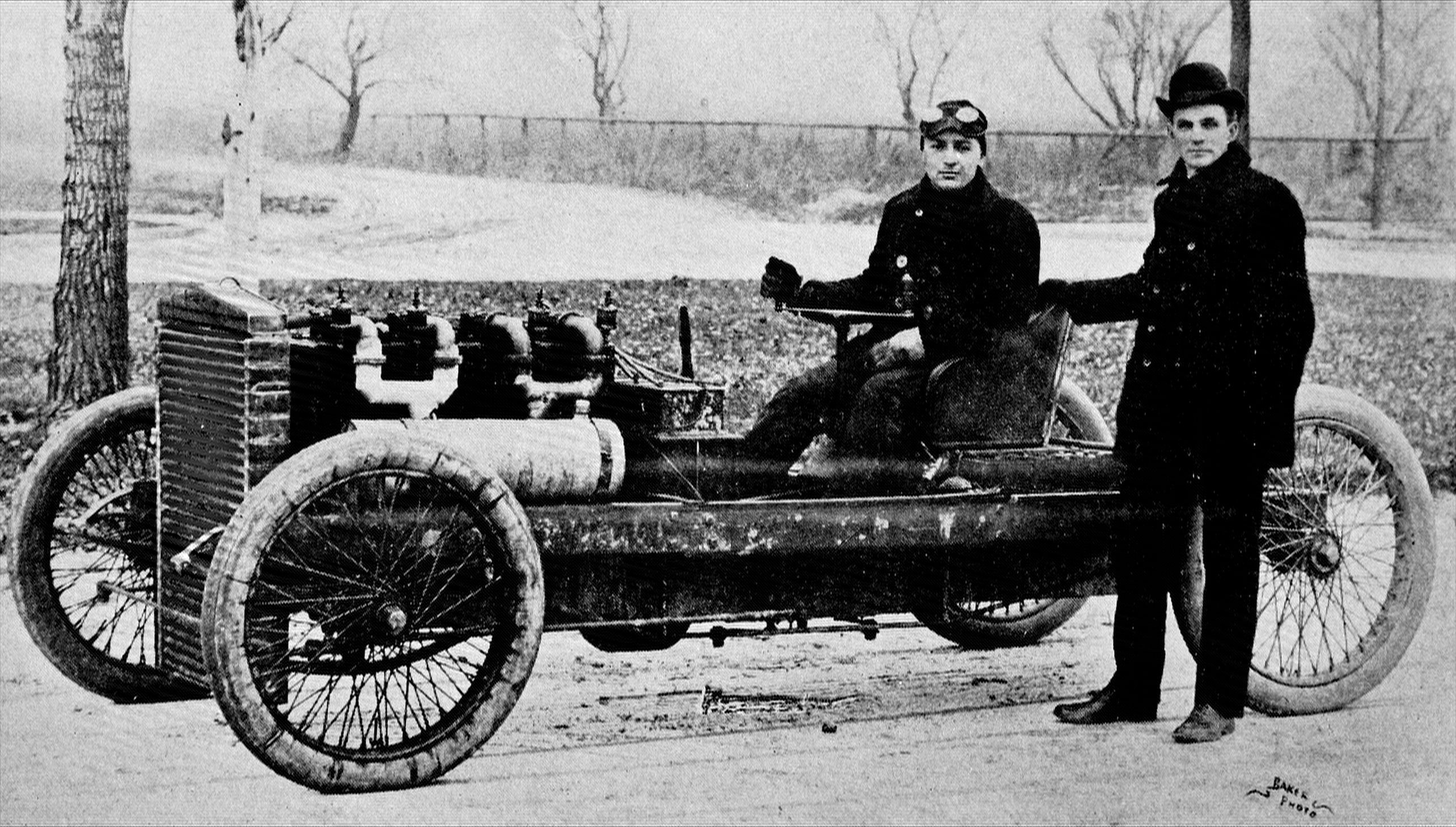
Barney Oldfield and Henry Ford with Oldfield's 999 speedster, 1902

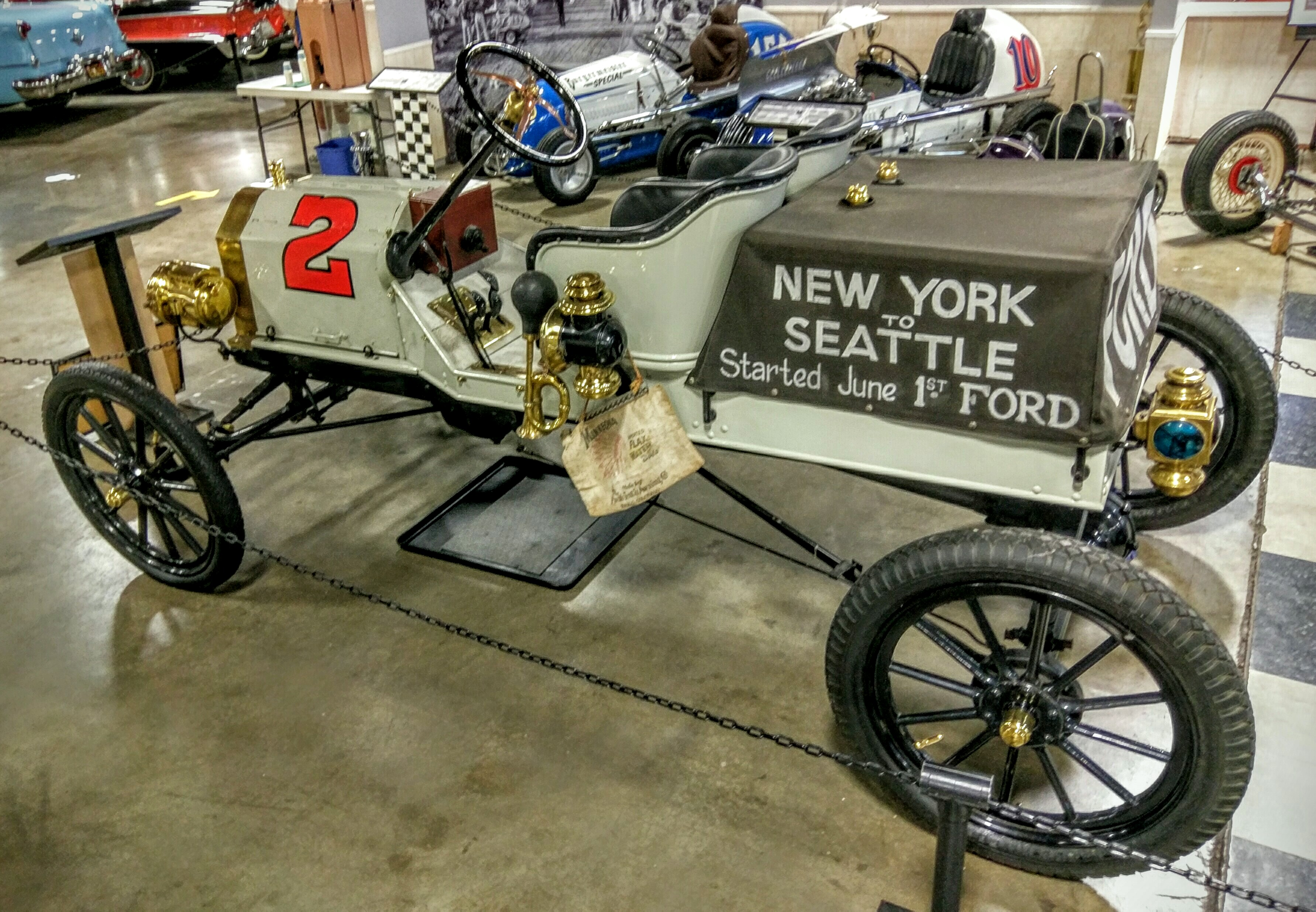
1909 model T speedster – announced winner of the 1909 Ocean to Ocean race, disqualified because of an engine change

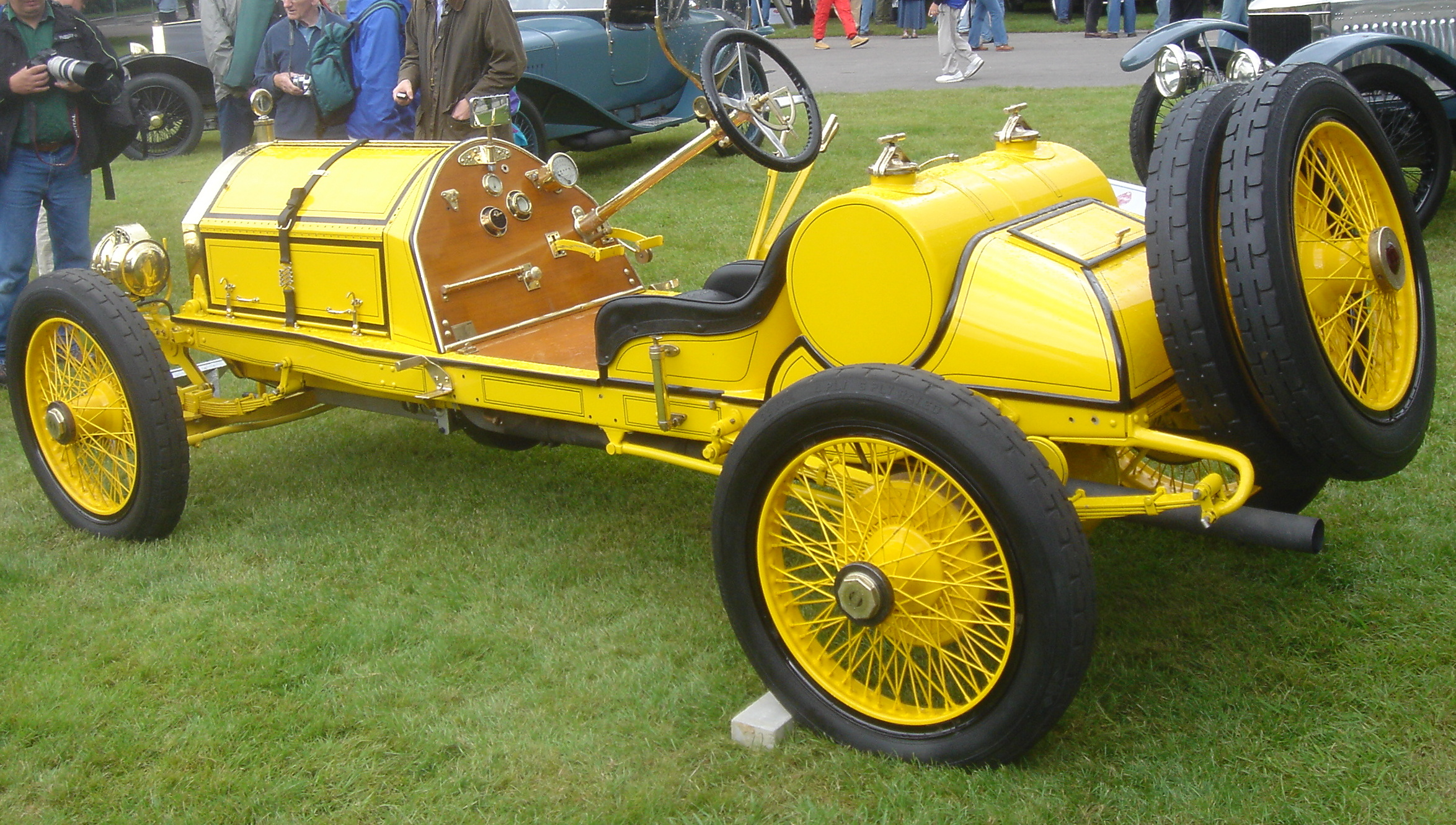
1910 Mercer 35R Raceabout (1912 specimen)

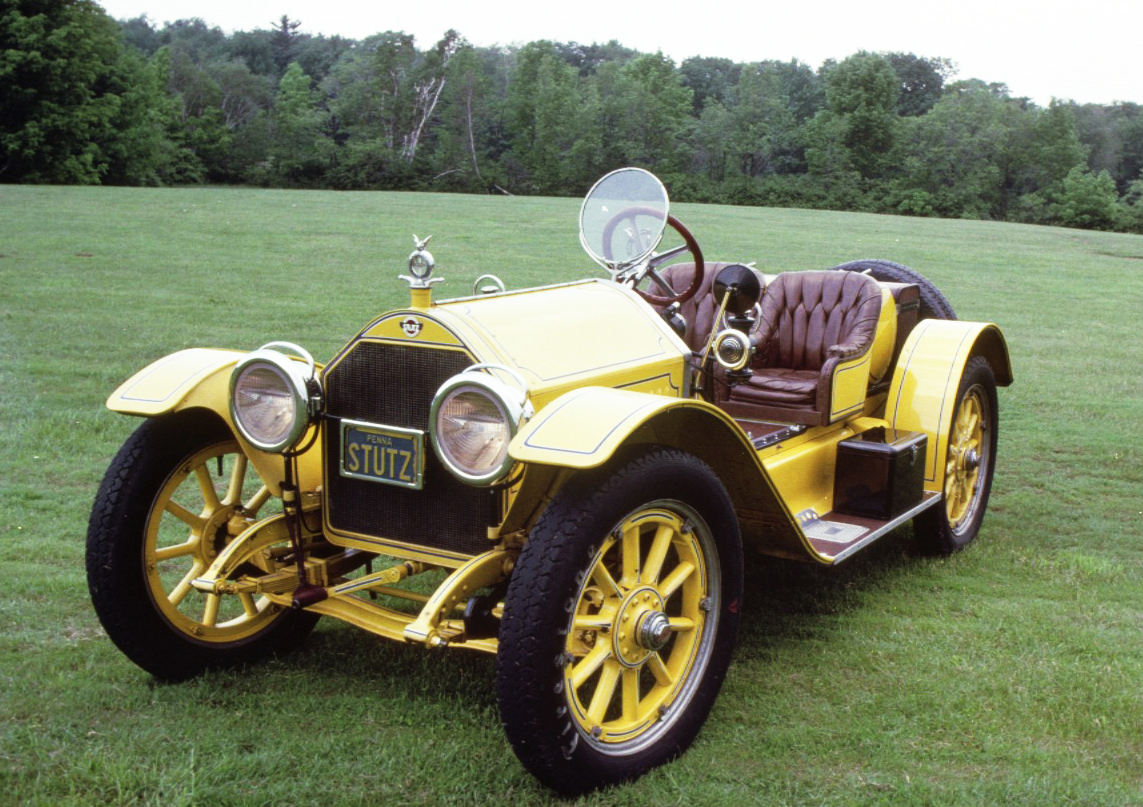
The 1912 Stutz Bear Cat / Bearcat, (1914 shown), available doorless through 1916

The immediate predecessor to the roadster was the runabout, a body style with a single row of seats and no doors, windshield, or other weather protection. Another predecessor was the touring car, similar in body style to the modern roadster except for its multiple rows of seats. By the 1920s roadsters were appointed similarly to touring cars, with doors, windshields, simple folding tops, and side curtains.

Roadster bodies were offered on automobiles of all sizes and classes, from mass-produced cars like the Ford Model T and the Austin 7 to extremely expensive cars like the Cadillac V-16, the Duesenberg Model J and Bugatti Royale.

1920s to 1950s roadsters

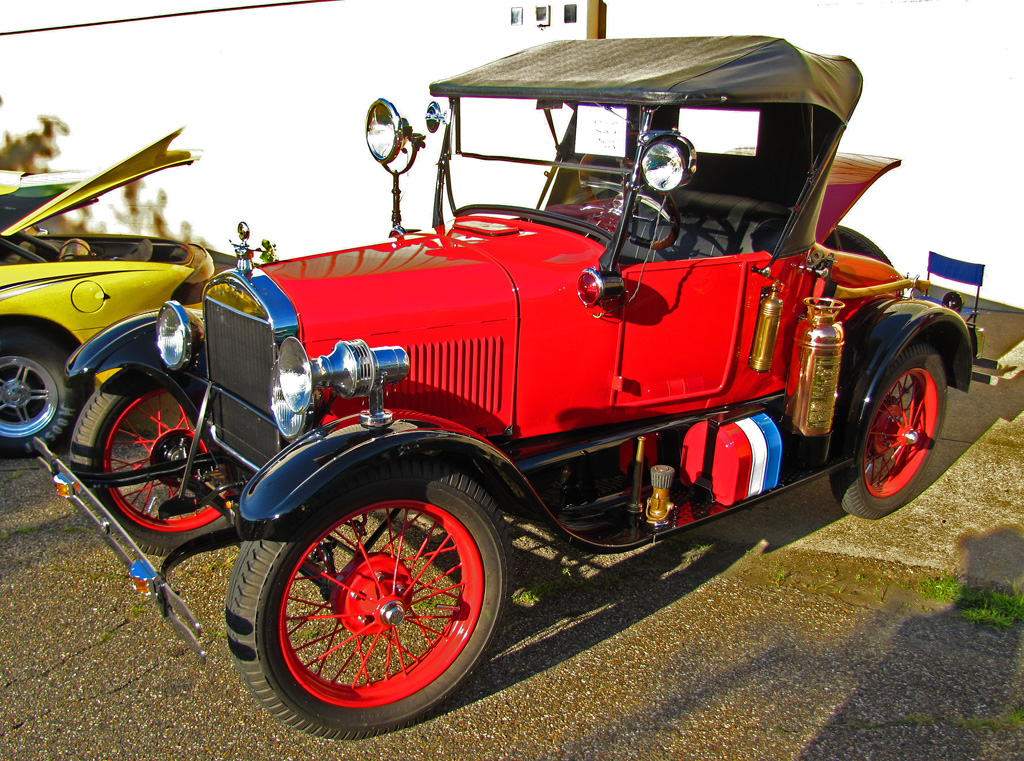
1926 Ford Model T roadster

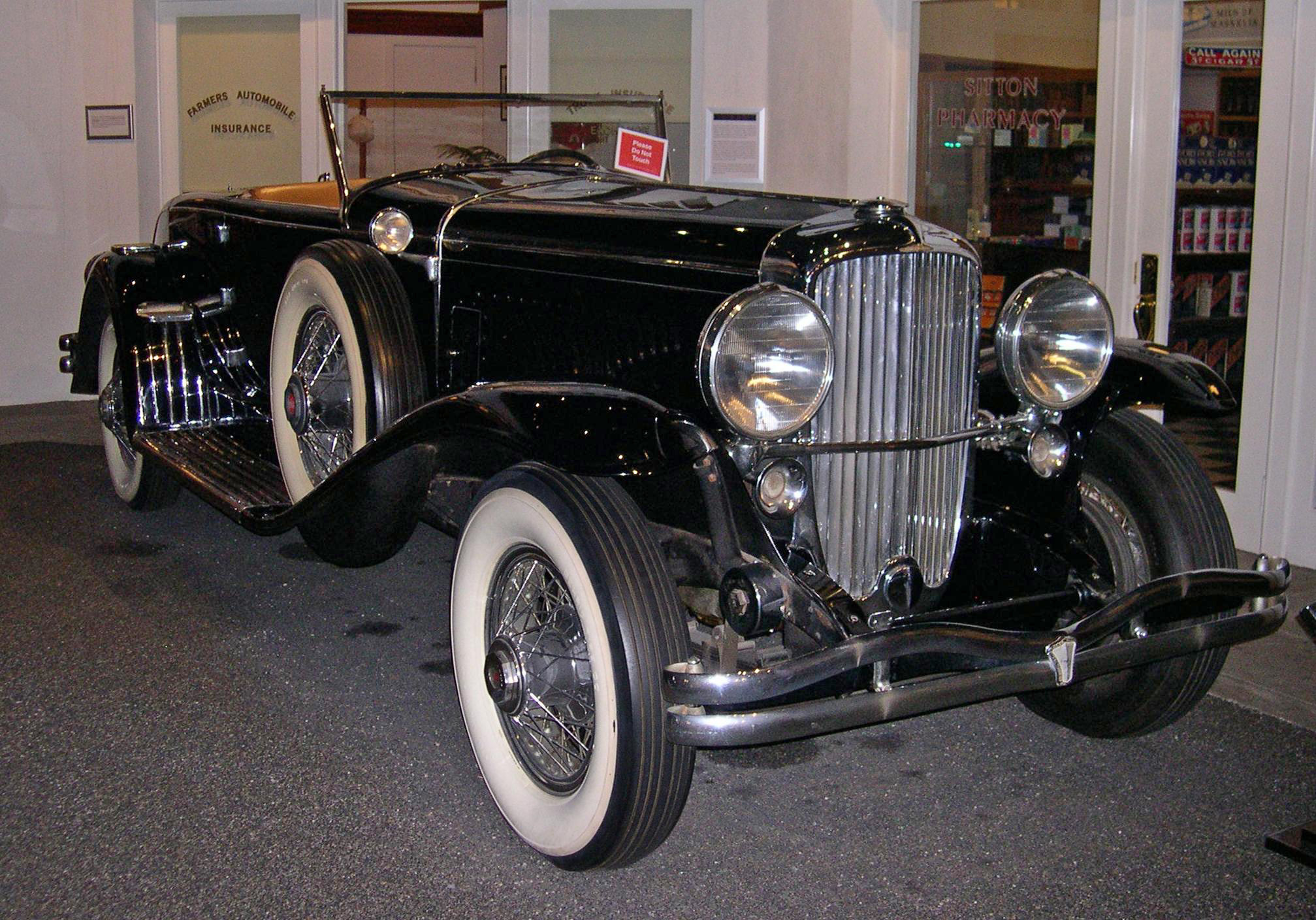
1932 Duesenberg J Murphy-bodied roadster

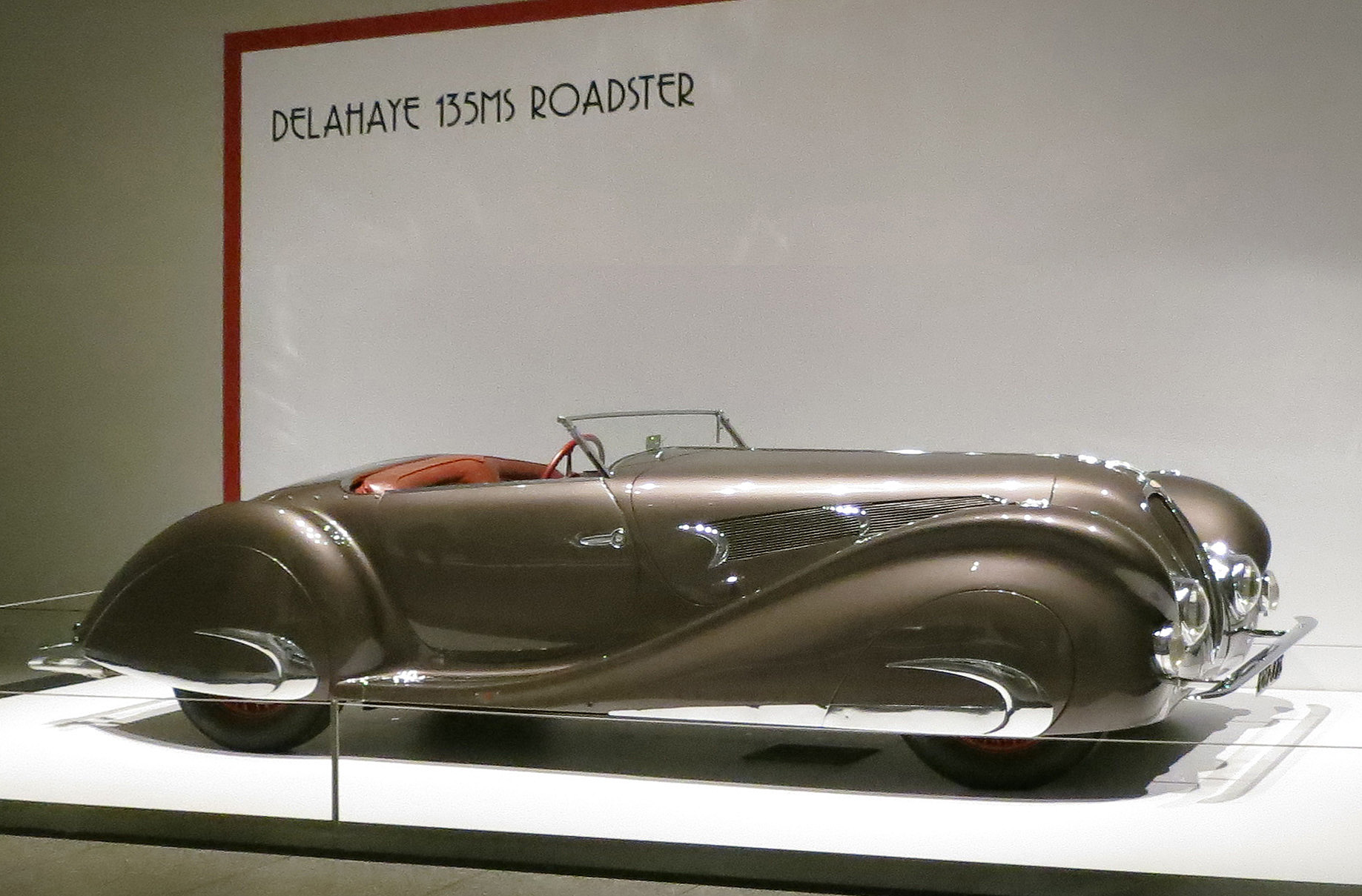
1937 Delahaye 135MS roadster

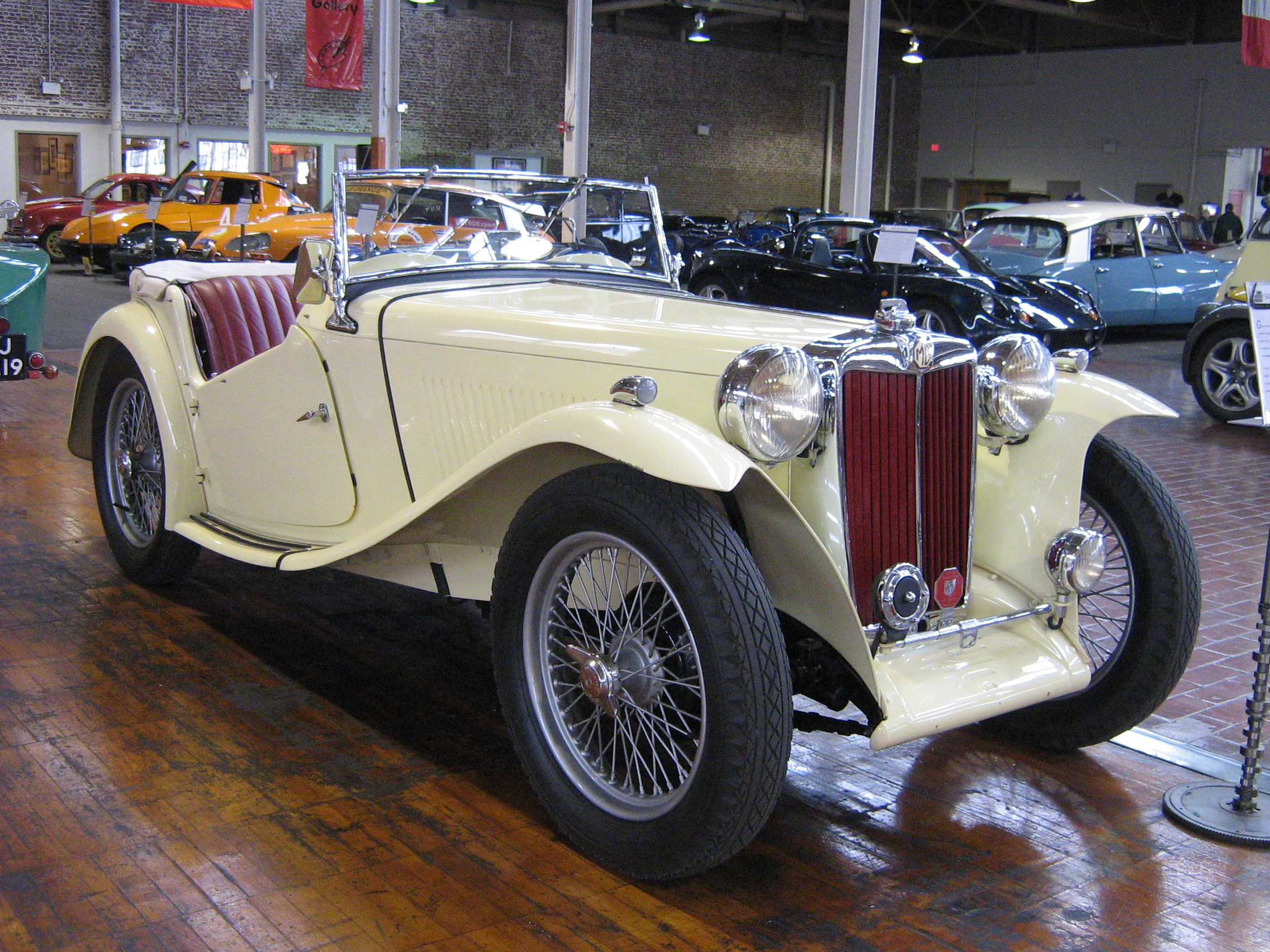
1949 MG TC open two-seater marketed in USA as a roadster

By the 1970s "roadster" could be applied to any two-seater car of sporting appearance or character. In response to market demand they were manufactured as well-equipped as convertibles with side windows that retracted into the doors. Popular models through the 1960s and 1970s were the Alfa Romeo Spider, MGB and Triumph TR4.

1950s to 1980s roadsters

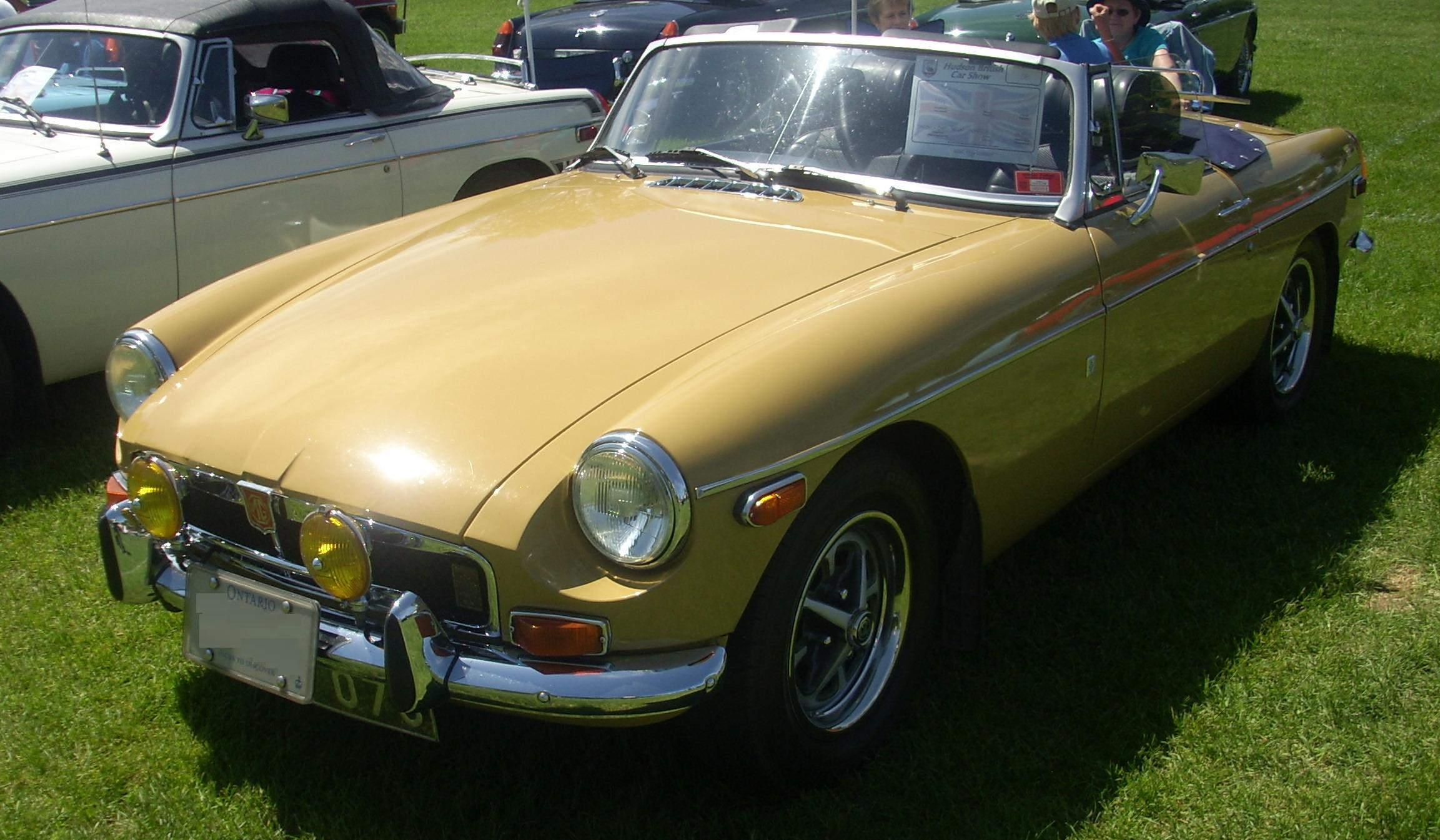
1973 MGB

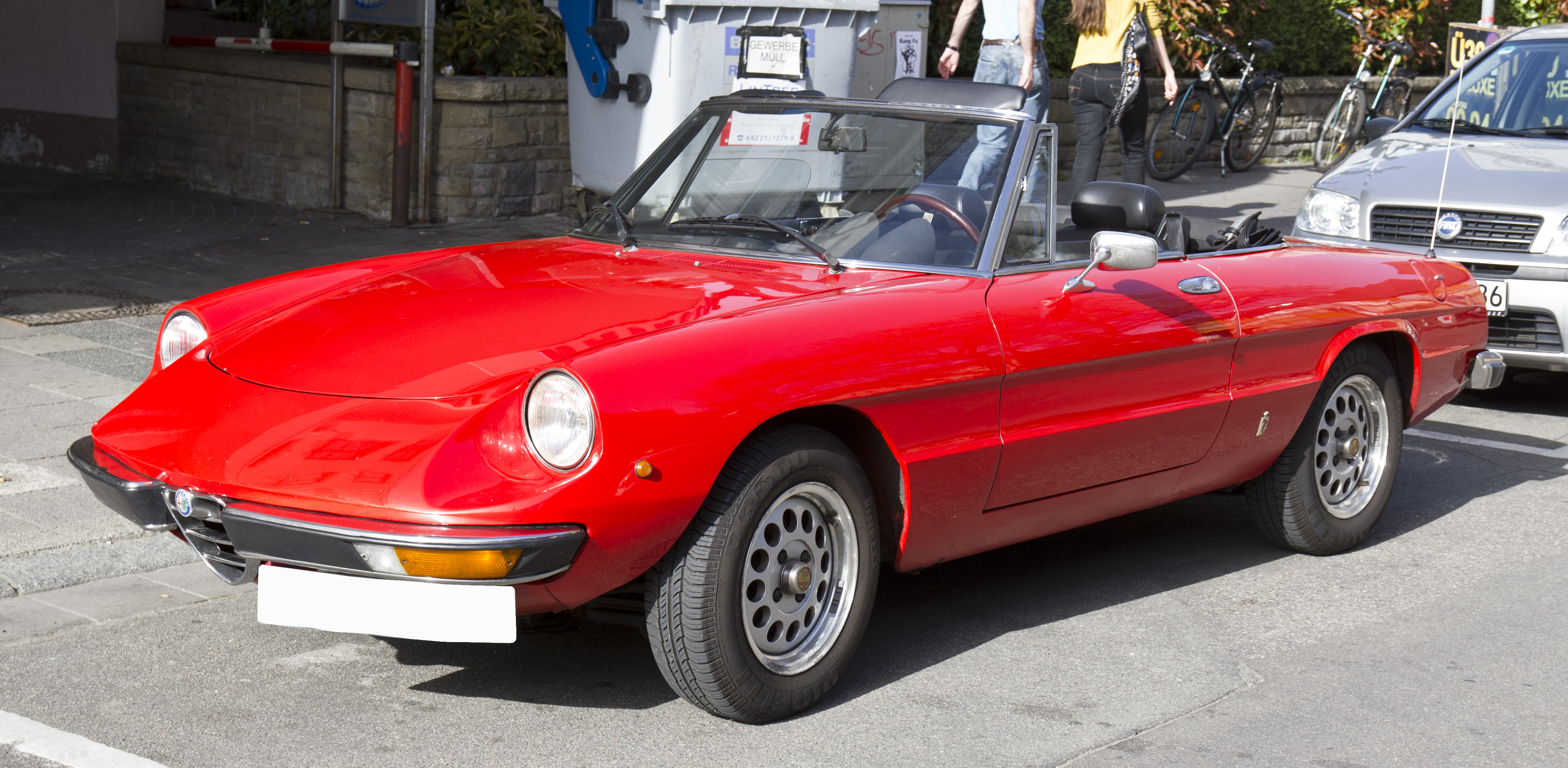
Alfa Romeo Spider

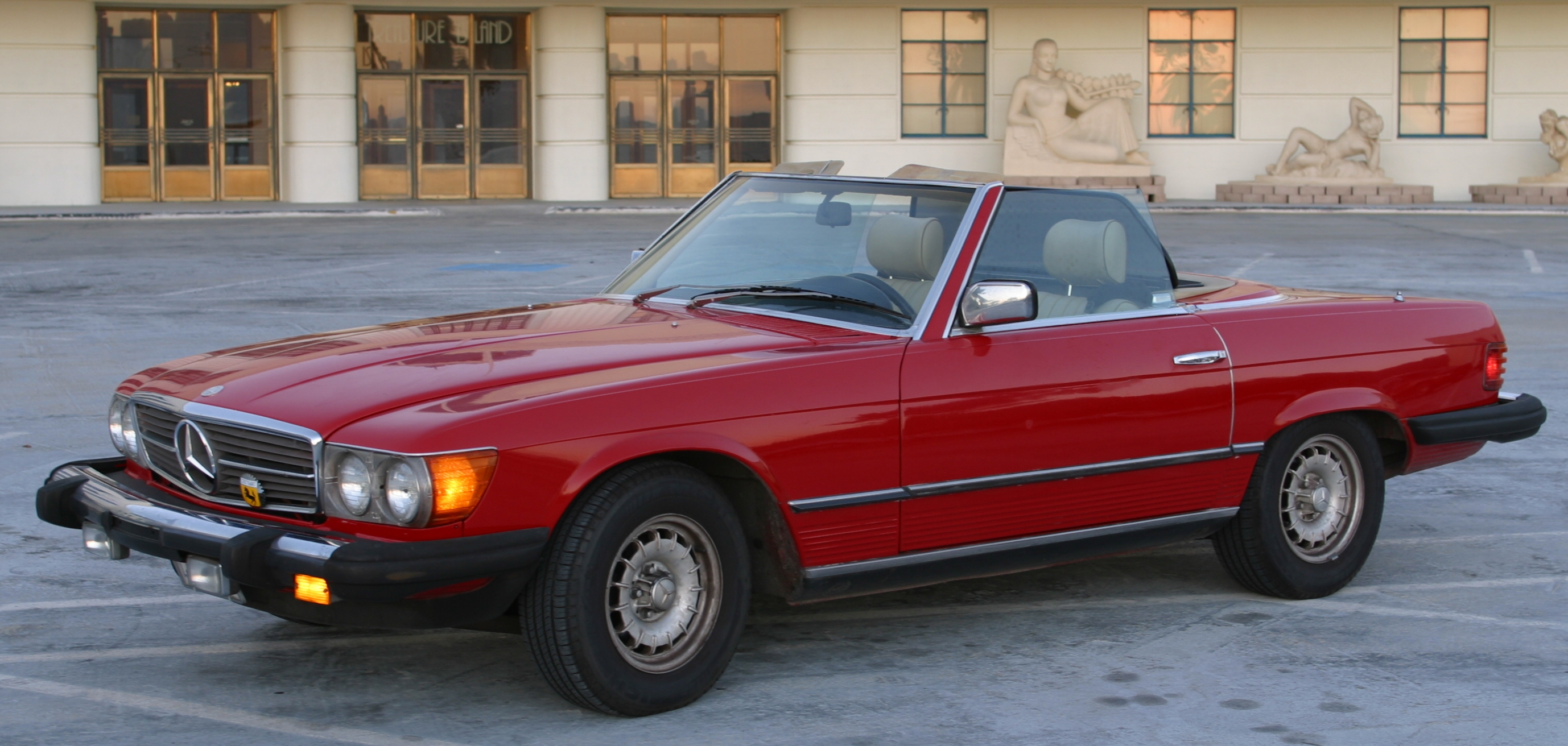
1983 Mercedes-Benz 380SL

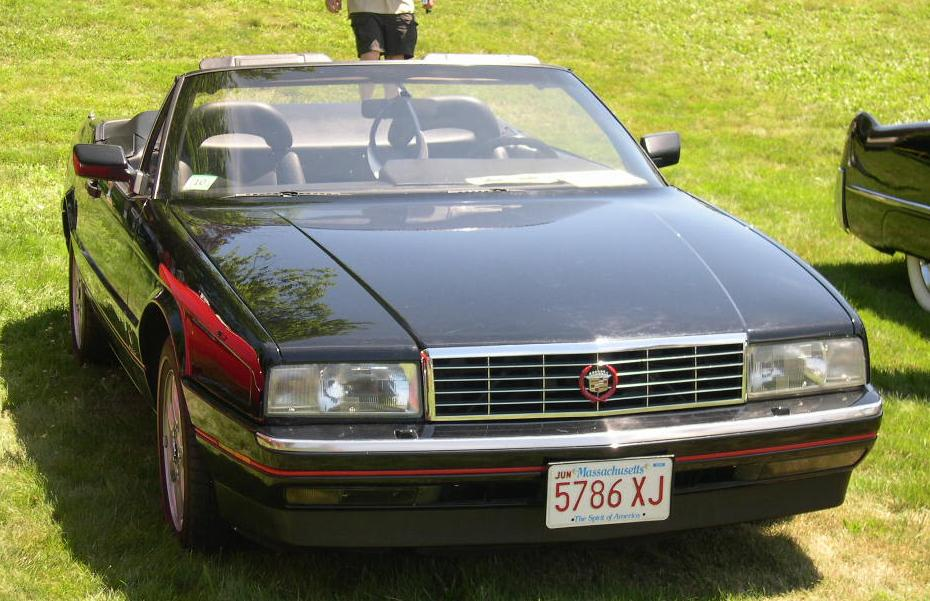
1987 Cadillac Allanté

The highest selling roadster is the Mazda MX-5, which was introduced in 1989. The early style of roadster with minimal weather protection is still in production by several low-volume manufacturers and fabricators, including the windowless Morgan Roadster, the doorless Caterham 7 and the bodyless Ariel Atom.

1990s to present day roadsters

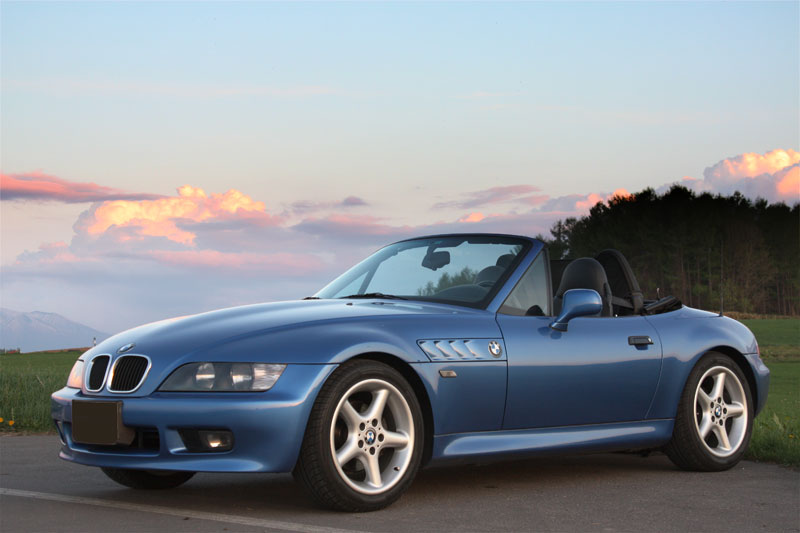
BMW Z3

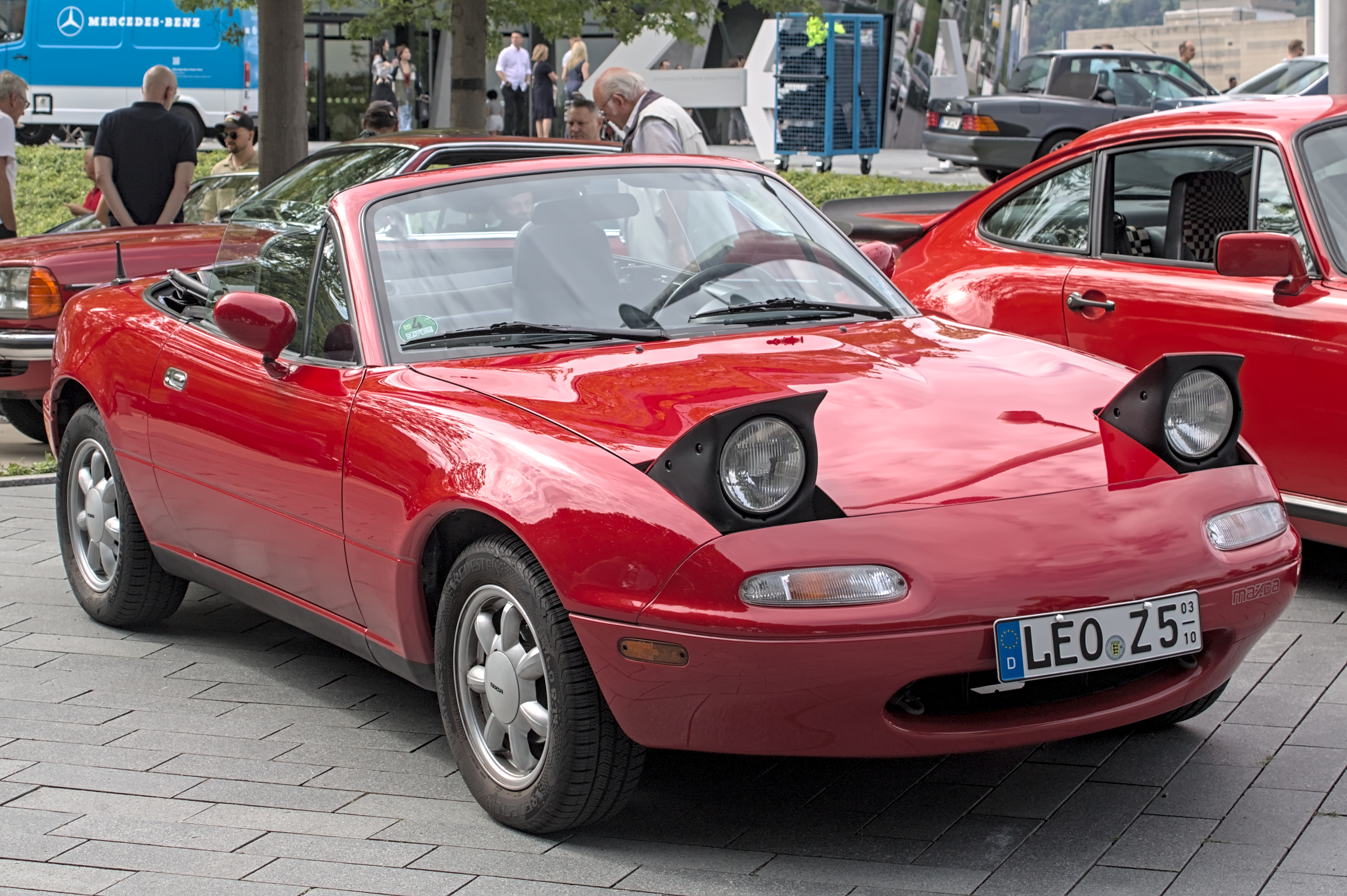
Mazda MX 5 (NA)

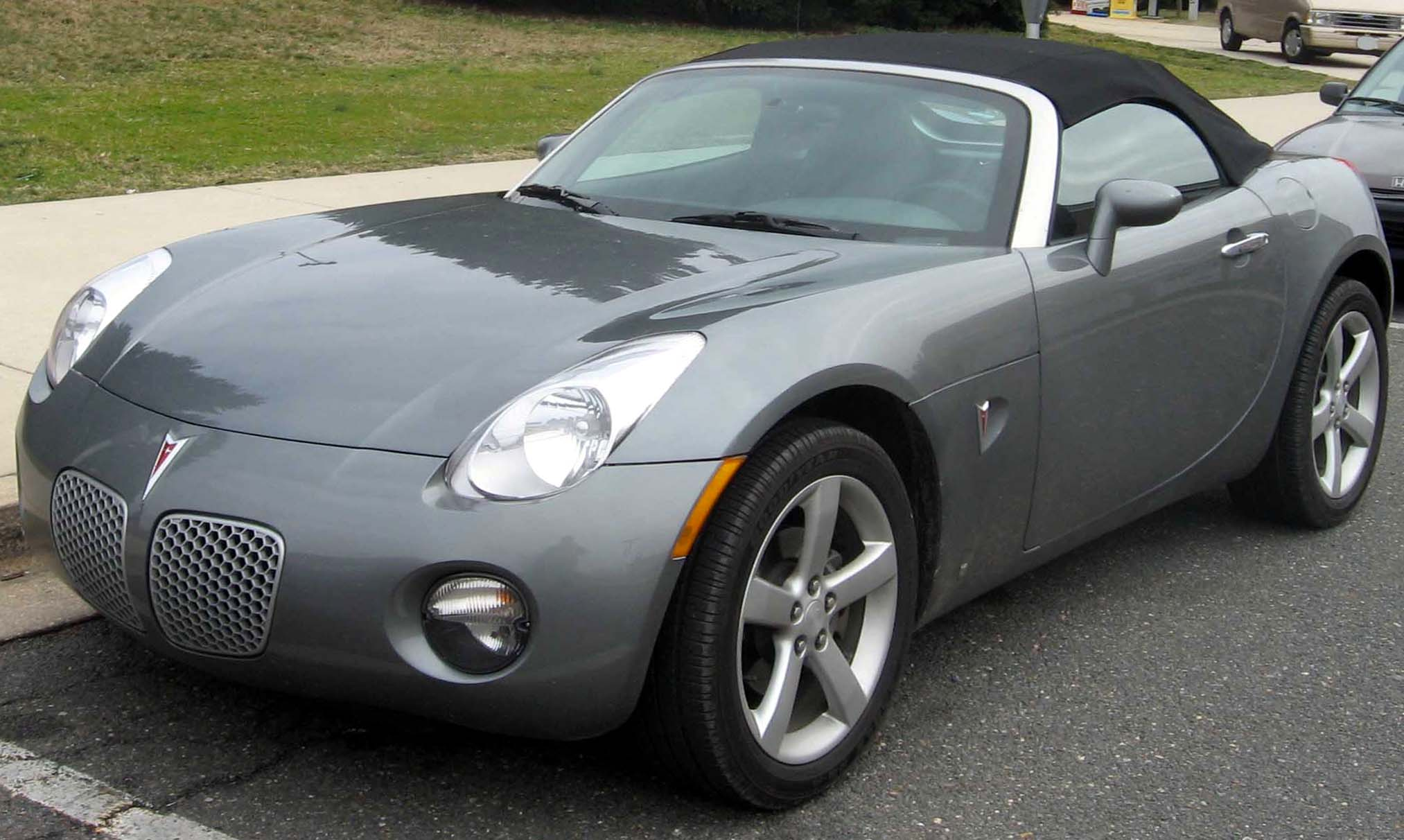
Pontiac Solstice

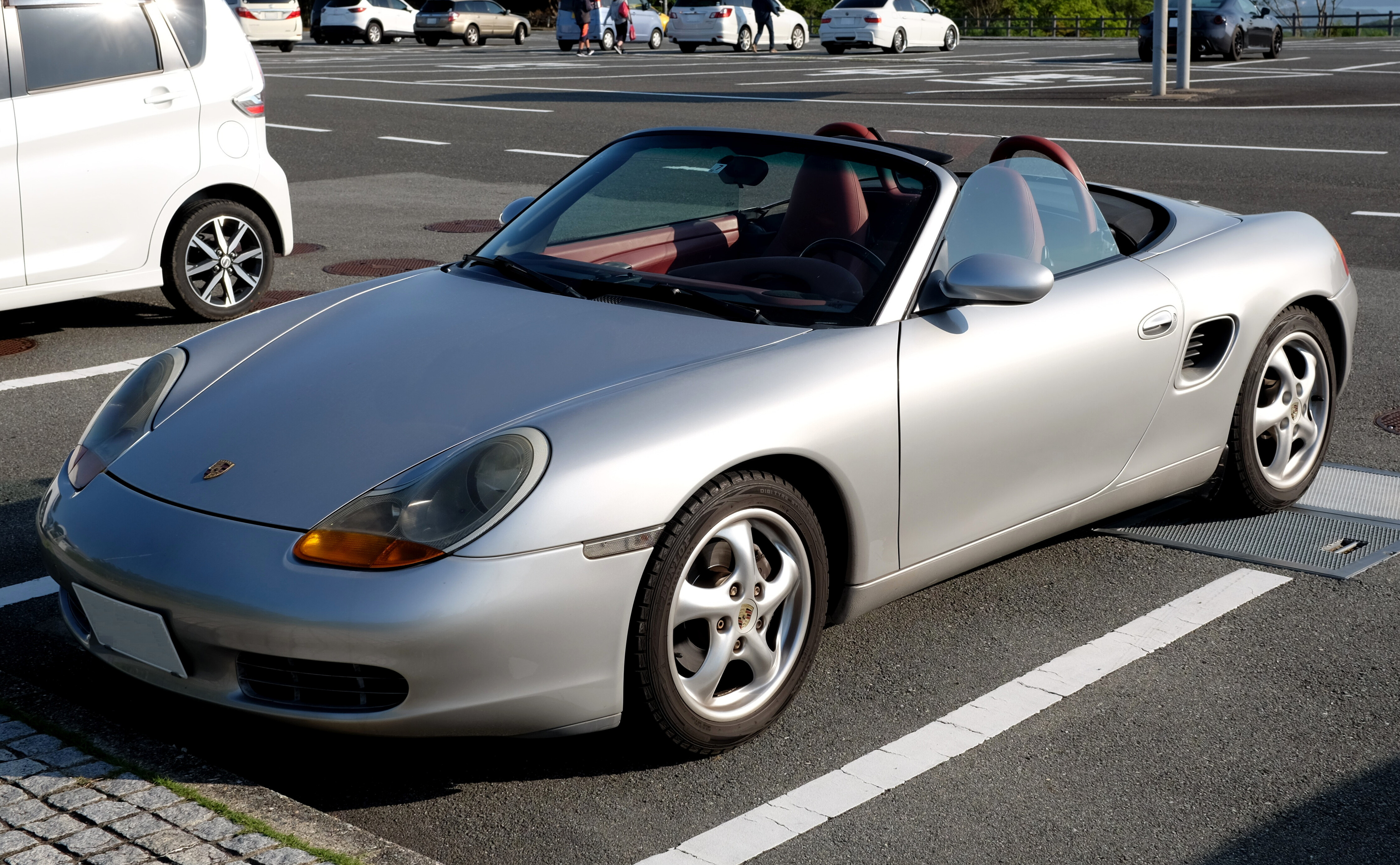
Porsche Boxster

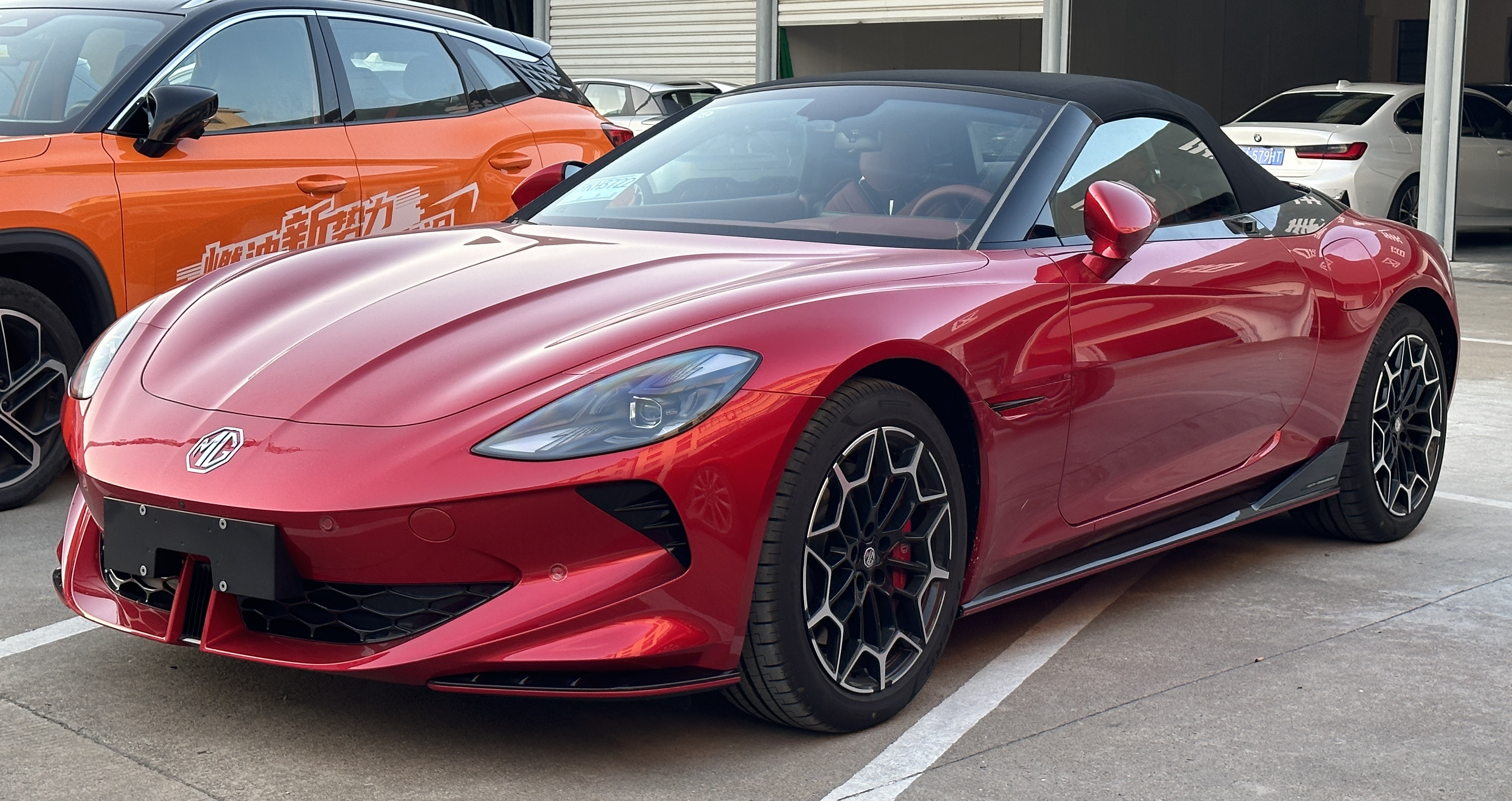
MG Cyberster

== IndyCar roadster layout ==
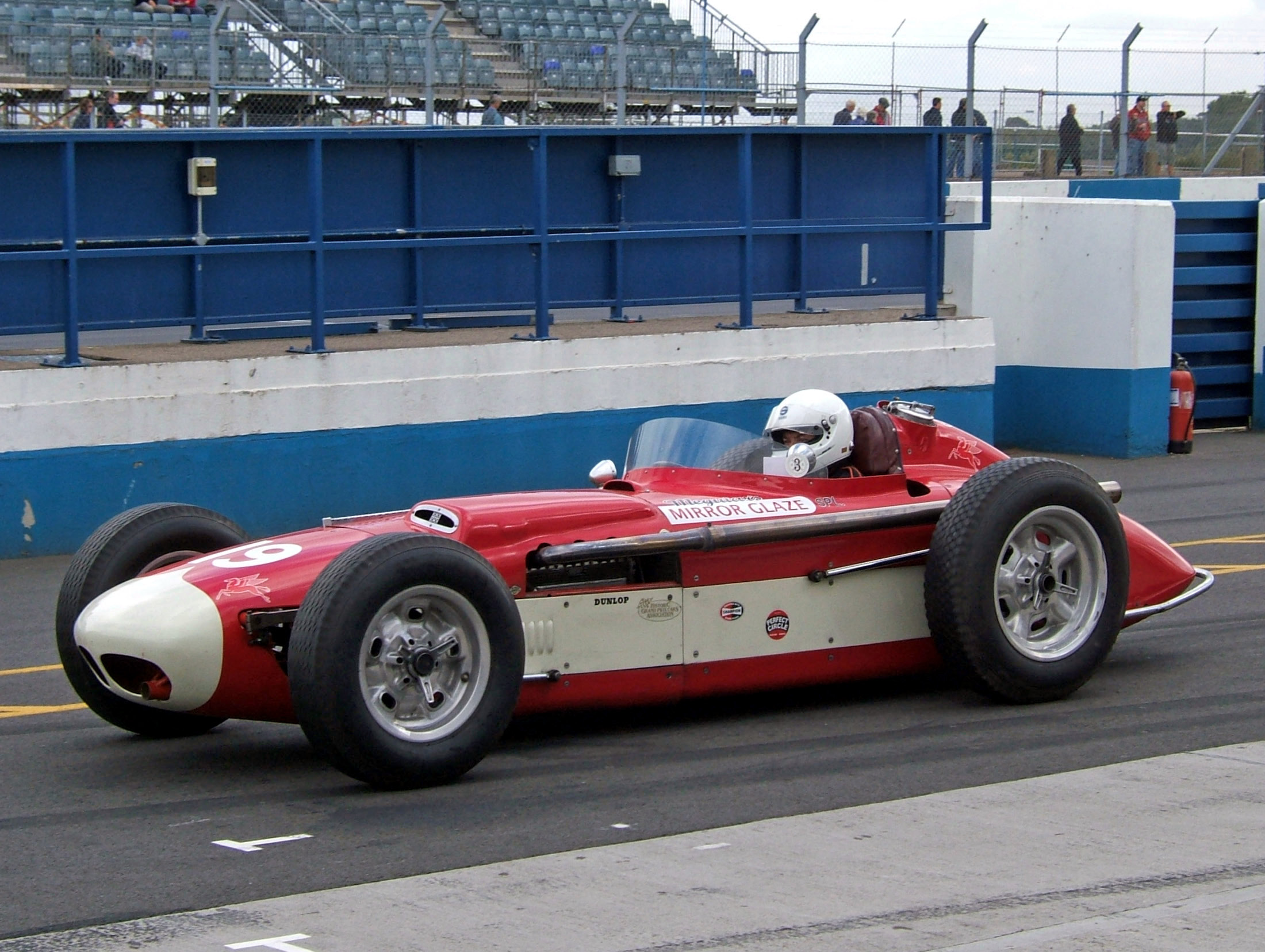
1957 Kurtis Indy roadster

The term roadster was used to describe a style of racing cars competing in the AAA/USAC Championship Cars series (the IndyCar equivalents of the time) from 1952 to 1969. The roadster engine and drive shaft are offset from the centerline of the car. This allows the driver to sit lower in the chassis and facilitates a weight offset which is beneficial on oval tracks.

One story of why this type of racing car is referred to as a "roadster" is that a team was preparing a new car for the Indianapolis 500. They had it covered in a corner of their shop. If they were asked about their car they would try and obscure its importance by saying that it was just their (hot rod) "roadster". After the Indianapolis racer was made public, the "roadster" name was still attached to it.

Frank Kurtis built the first roadster to race and entered it in the 1952 Indianapolis 500. It was driven by Bill Vukovich who led for most of the race until a steering failure eliminated him. The Howard Keck owned team with Vukovich driving went on to win the 1953 and 1954 contests with the same car. Bob Sweikert won the 1955 500 in a Kurtis after Vukovich was killed while leading. A. J. Watson, George Salih and Quinn Epperly were other notable roadster constructors. Watson-built roadsters won in 1956, 1959 – 1964 though the 1961 and 1963 winners were actually close copies built from Watson designs. The 1957 and 1958 winner was the same car built by Salih with help by Epperly built with a unique placement of the engine in a 'lay down' mounting so the cylinders were nearly horizontal instead of vertical as traditional design dictated. This gave a slightly lower center of mass and a lower profile.

Roadsters continued to race until the late 1960s, although they became increasingly uncompetitive against the new rear-engined racing cars. The last roadster to complete the full race distance was in 1965, when Gordon Johncock finished fifth in the Wienberger Homes Watson car. The last roadster to make the race was built and driven by Jim Hurtubise in the 1968 race and dropped out early.

Some pavement midget roadsters were built and raced into the early 1970s but never were dominant.

== See also ==
- Barchetta, a related two-seater body style designed primarily for racing
- Convertible, the general term to describe vehicles with retractable roofs and retractable side windows
- Roadster utility
- Tonneau cover, a protective cover for the seats in an open car
