= Morgan Four Seater =

Morgan 4-4 and 4/4 Four Seat Tourer
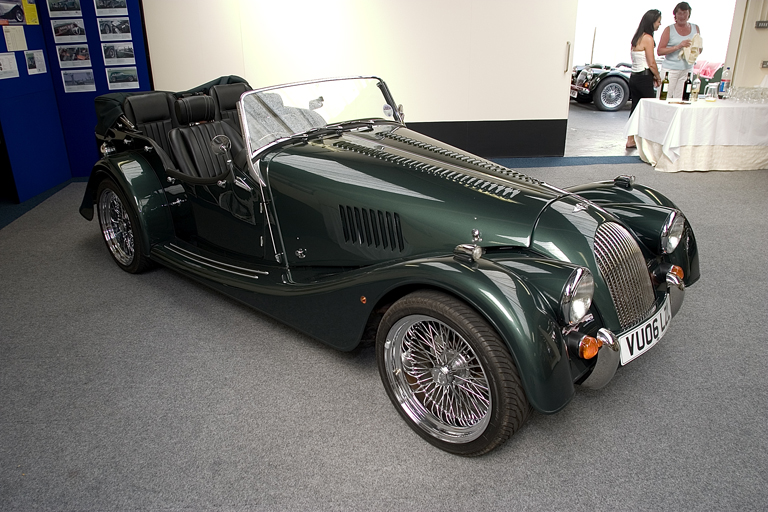
- 2006 Morgan Four Seater

Overview
- Manufacturer: Morgan Motor Company
- Production: 1937-2016

Body and chassis
- Class: Sports car Touring car
- Body style: 2-door convertible

The Morgan Four Seater is a model from the Morgan Motor Company with four full seats but little luggage space. It is a touring car, with snap-on top and side curtains.

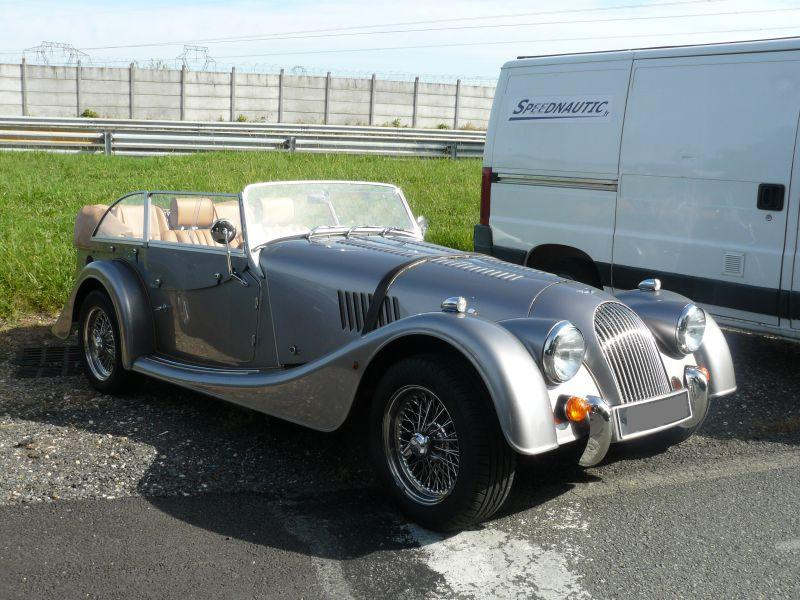
Front view of a Tourer

The Four-Seater Tourer has been offered since 1937, on the 4-4 chassis (1937–39) and its postwar incarnation as the 4/4 1948–50, the Plus 4 (1950–68), the 4/4 1600 (1969–1993), 4/4 1800 (1999–2001) and the later Plus 4 (2006–2016) and Roadster (2006–2016).

Reportedly only about 50 four-seaters were built per year.

The body design had few changes from 1937 until the 1990s when the rear seat area was redesigned, primarily to make the seats lower in the car. In the earlier body the rear passengers sat higher than the front ones, owing to the clearance needed over the rear axle. In 2006 a body with further redesign was introduced. The changes in the latest body include longer doors for easier access, improved rear seating, and a top design that is easier to put up and down.
