= Morgan Roadster =

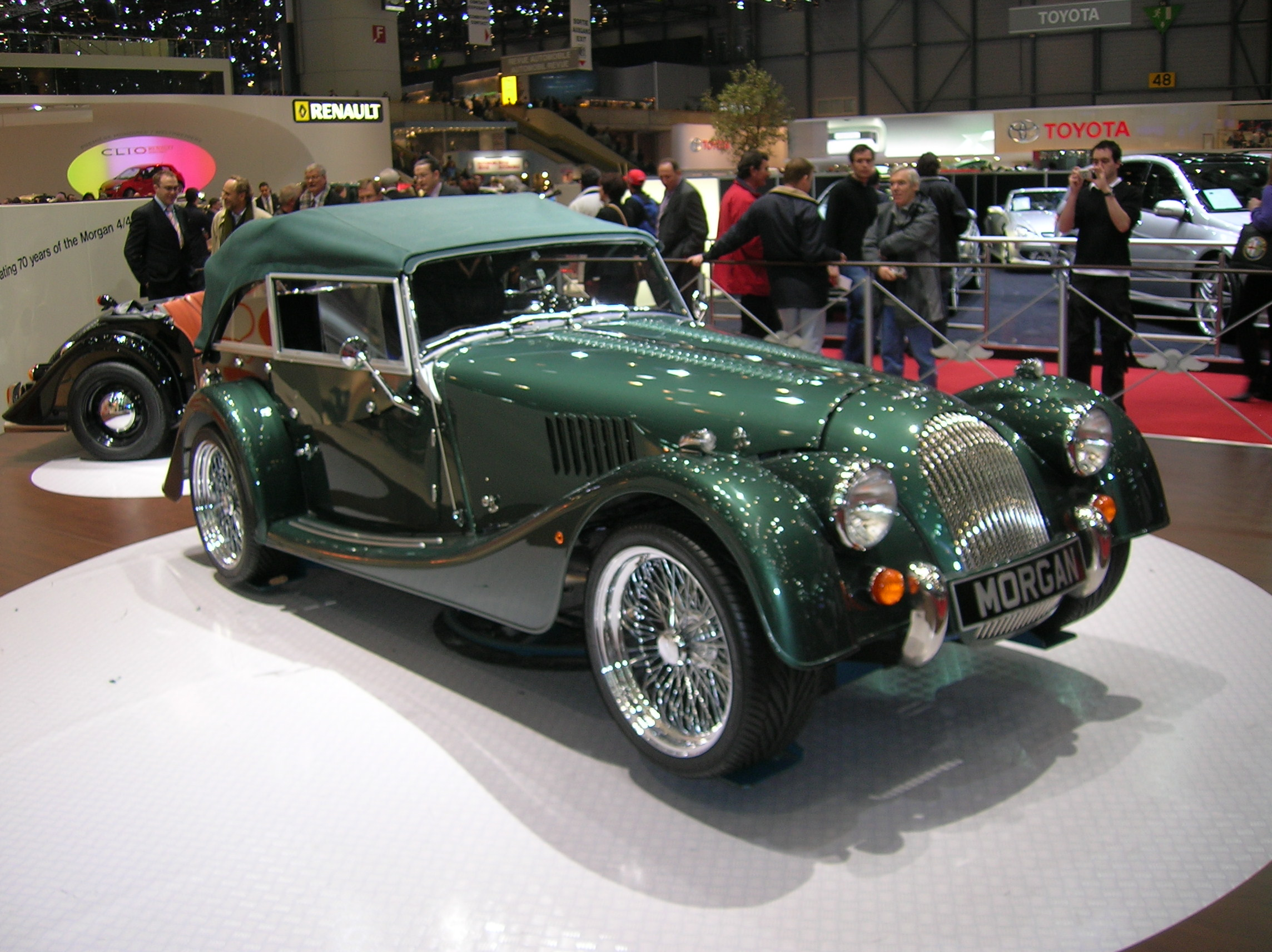

Overview
- Manufacturer: Morgan Motor Company
- Also called: Morgan V6 Roadster
- Production: 2004–2019
- Assembly: United Kingdom: Malvern, Worcestershire, England

Body and chassis
- Class: Sports car
- Body style: 2-door convertible
- Layout: front-engine, rear-wheel-drive
- Related: Morgan +4

Powertrain
- Engine: 3.0 L Ford Duratec V6; 3.7 L Ford Cyclone V6

Dimensions
- Length: 4,010 mm (157.9 in)
- Width: 1,610 mm (63.4 in) (standard wheels); 1,720 mm (67.7 in) (optional wheels)
- Height: 1,220 mm (48.0 in)

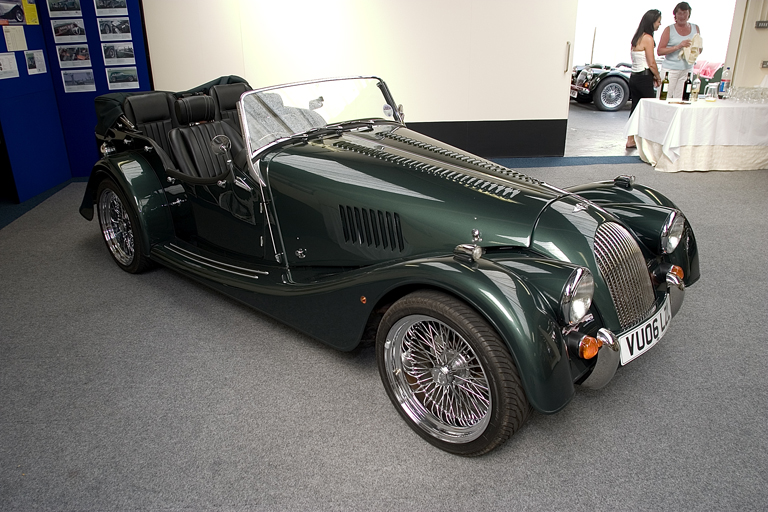
4 Seater Roadster

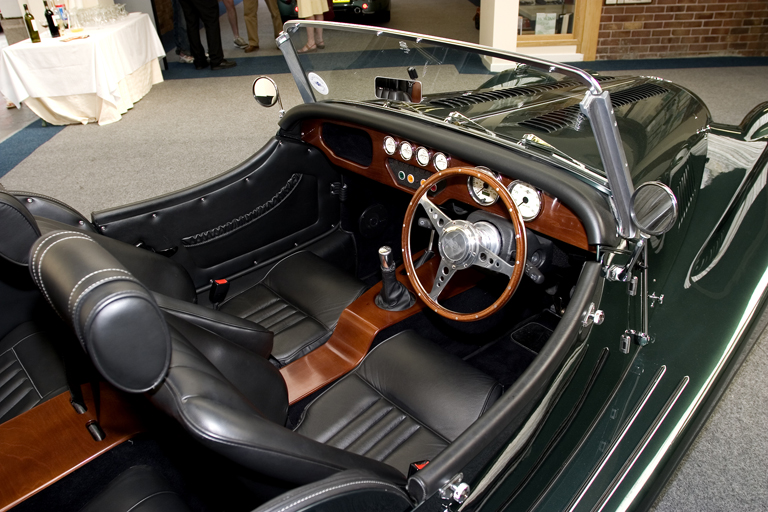
Cockpit

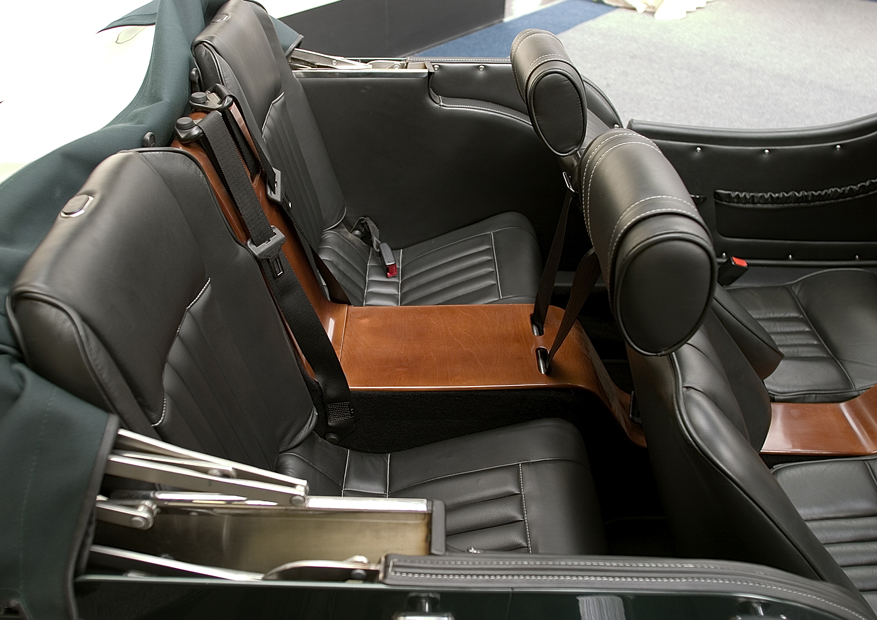
Rear Seating

The Morgan Roadster is a model produced by the Morgan Motor Company. It was introduced in 2004, replacing the Morgan Plus 8. The car is identical to its predecessor except for new, modern Ford V6 mechanicals. The new engine develops similar power, though less torque, and is slightly lighter than the Rover V8 which results in increased performance and better fuel economy. Air conditioning is now standard on U.S. models. Like its predecessor, the chassis consists of a standard ladder frame design and is built from galvanised steel with five tubular or box section cross members. The body is built of steel and aluminum around an ash frame. The suspension is a traditional Morgan slider type up front and solid axle/leaf spring at the rear.

Unlike its predecessor, the Roadster was available as a 2-seater or a 4-seater.

The standard colour range is Royal Ivory, Corsa Red, Indigo Blue, Connaught Green, and Black, but any single colour or two-tone combination from the ICI Autocolour range is available as an option.

== Specification ==
=== Weight ===
- Kerb weight, kg (actual dependent on spec.) : 940 kg (2,072 lb) (lowline)
- Ground clearance (average) (driver and passenger) : 100 mm (3.9 in)
- Maximum total weight including passengers and luggage : 1,400 kg (3,086 lb)

=== Fuel ===
Fuel tank capacity : 55 L (15 US gal; 12 imp gal)

- Fuel consumption :
  - Urban: 19.2 mpg_{‑imp} (14.7 L/100 km; 16.0 mpg_{‑US})
  - Extra urban: 40.4 mpg_{‑imp} (6.99 L/100 km; 33.6 mpg_{‑US})
  - Combined: 28.8 mpg_{‑imp} (9.8 L/100 km; 24.0 mpg_{‑US})
  - CO_{2}: 231.8 g/km

=== Wheels ===
Standard bolt-on alloy wheels (5 stud) 6.5" x 15" (205/55/16 tyres) Optional 100% stainless wire wheels 72 spoke 7" x 16" (205/55/16 tyres)

=== Steering ===
Turning circle m/ft : 9.75/32
Turns lock to lock : 3 rack and pinion
Steering column : Collapsible safety top section with combined lock
Steering wheel : 15" standard, 14" nco, 16" with offset centre for airbag markets

=== Transmission ===
- mph/1000 rpm (top gear) : 23.67
- mph at 2500 ft/min, piston speed (theoretical) : 113.6
- Final drive ratio : 3.08
- Overall gearing in top gear : 3.06:1

Indirect ratios:

- 1st gear : 4.23
- 2nd gear : 2.52
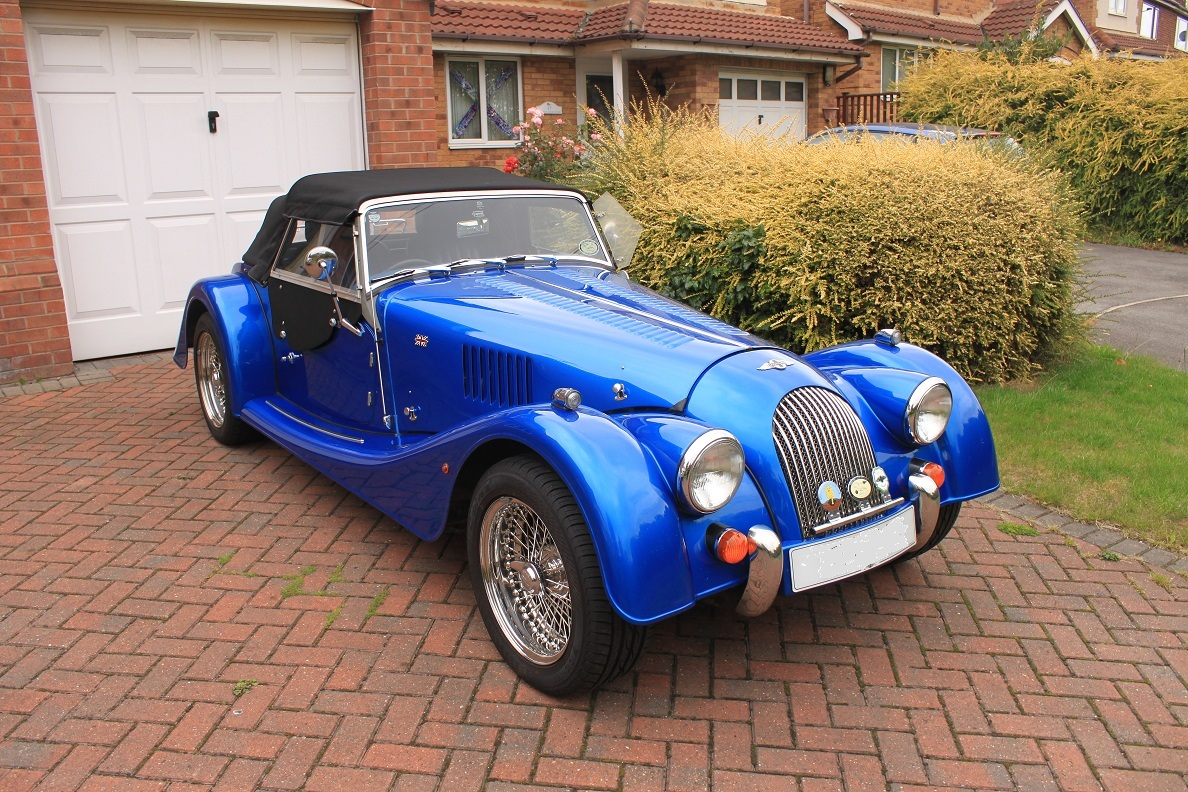
- 2-seater Roadster (a 2005 model).
  3rd gear : 1.67
- 4th gear : 1.22
- 5th gear : 1
- Reverse : 3.51

=== Clutch ===
Single dry plate

=== Rear axle ===
Tubular live axle with hypoid gears and limited slip.

=== Suspension ===
- Front: Independent sliding pillar with coil springs and gas filled telescopic shock absorbers
- Rear: Semi-elliptic leaf springs with gas telescopic shock absorbers
- Toe in: 0–3 mm or 0-30

=== Engine ===
Model: Ford Cyclone V6
Configuration: 3.7 litre V6 24 valve
Bore x stroke, mm: 95.5 x 86.6
Engine capacity, cc: 3721
Max output EEC: 209 kW (280 hp) at 6000
Max torque EEC: 380 N·m 280 (lbf·ft)
Power-to-weight ratio: 295 bhp / tonne

=== Fuel System ===
Minimum octane rating 95 Ron Electronic fuel injection. Sealed evaporative control system through charcoal canister. Tubular stainless manifolds (headers) to stainless steel twin exhaust with catalysts.

=== Brakes ===
- Front : AP Lockheed 4 pot calipers, 28 cm/11" disc brakes
- Rear : 23 cm/9" drum
- Operation : Hydraulic dual circuit with servo assistance
- Handbrake : Sports "Fly-off" type

== Performance ==
- 0 – 100 km/h (62 mph): 5.5 seconds
- Top speed: 140 mph (215 km/h)
